= 2025 Țiriac Open – Singles =

Singles
- 2025 Țiriac Open

Final
- Champion: (Italy) Flavio Cobolli
- Runner-up: (Argentina) Sebastián Báez
- Score: 6–4, 6–4

Details
- Draw: 28 (4 Q / 3 WC)
- Seeds: 8

Events
Singles	Doubles
← 2024 ·	Romanian Open	· 2026 →

Flavio Cobolli defeated Sebastián Báez in the final, 6–4, 6–4 to win the singles title at the 2025 Țiriac Open. It was his first ATP Tour title.

Márton Fucsovics was the defending champion, but lost in the semifinals to Báez.

== Seeds ==
The top four seeds received a bye into the second round.

1. (Argentina) Sebastián Báez (final)
2. (Spain) Pedro Martínez (quarterfinals, retired)
3. (Italy) Flavio Cobolli (champion)
4. (Chile) Nicolás Jarry (second round)
5. (Spain) Roberto Bautista Agut (second round)
6. (Hungary) Fábián Marozsán (withdrew)
7. (Argentina) Mariano Navone (second round)
8. (Argentina) Camilo Ugo Carabelli (second round)

== Draw ==
=== Key ===
- Q = Qualifier
- WC = Wild card
- LL = Lucky loser
- Alt = Alternate
- ITF = ITF entry
- PR = Protected ranking
- SR = Special ranking
- SE = Special exempt
- JE = Junior exempt
- JR = Junior Accelerator Programme entrant
- CO = College Accelerator Programme entrant
- NG = Next Gen Accelerator Program entrant
- w/o = Walkover
- r = Retired
- d = Defaulted

=== Finals ===
Semifinals
1	(Argentina) Sebastián Báez	6	6
(Hungary) Márton Fucsovics	2	2
3	(Italy) Flavio Cobolli	6	6
(Bosnia and Herzegovina) Damir Džumhur	3	0

Final
1	(Argentina) Sebastián Báez	4	4
3	(Italy) Flavio Cobolli	6	6

=== Top half ===
First round
(Canada) G Diallo	7^{7}	7^{7}
(Chinese Taipei) C-h Tseng	6^{5}	6^{2}
Q	(Slovakia) M Kližan	6	5	5
(Argentina) F Comesaña	4	7	7
(China) Y Bu	6	2	5
5	(Spain) R Bautista Agut	3	6	7
(Serbia) D Lajović	4	3
(Australia) C O'Connell	6	6
(Italy) L Nardi	3	1
(Hungary) M Fucsovics	6	6
(Serbia) L Djere	1	6	2
7	(Argentina) M Navone	6	4	6

Second round
1	(Argentina) S Báez	7^{7}	2	6
(Canada) G Diallo	6^{5}	6	2
(Argentina) F Comesaña	6	3	6
5	(Spain) R Bautista Agut	4	6	3
4	(Chile) N Jarry	2	7	6^{5}
(Australia) C O'Connell	6	5	7^{7}
(Hungary) M Fucsovics	4	6	6
7	(Argentina) M Navone	6	4	4

Quarterfinals
1	(Argentina) S Báez	7^{7}	2	6
(Argentina) F Comesaña	6^{5}	6	1
(Australia) C O'Connell	0	4
(Hungary) M Fucsovics	6	6

Semifinals
1	(Argentina) S Báez	6	6
(Hungary) M Fucsovics	2	2

=== Bottom half ===
First round
8	(Argentina) C Ugo Carabelli	6	6
LL	(Moldova) R Albot	4	3
(Kazakhstan) A Shevchenko	3	4
Q	(Austria) F Misolic	6	6
(Netherlands) B van de Zandschulp	6	5	1
WC	(France) R Gasquet	4	7	6
Q	(Monaco) V Vacherot	2	1
(Bosnia and Herzegovina) D Džumhur	6	6
(United States) N Basavareddy	3	4
WC	(Romania) FC Jianu	6	6
WC	(Switzerland) S Wawrinka	6	6^{5}	7^{7}
Q	(Kazakhstan) T Skatov	4	7^{7}	6^{1}

Second round
8	(Argentina) C Ugo Carabelli	3	1
Q	(Austria) F Misolic	6	6
WC	(France) R Gasquet	4	6	1
3	(Italy) F Cobolli	6	4	6
(Bosnia and Herzegovina) D Džumhur	6	3	6
WC	(Romania) FC Jianu	4	6	3
WC	(Switzerland) S Wawrinka	6	5	2
2	(Spain) P Martínez	4	7	6

Quarterfinals
Q	(Austria) F Misolic	6^{5}	4
3	(Italy) F Cobolli	7^{7}	6
(Bosnia and Herzegovina) D Džumhur	6	2
2	(Spain) P Martínez	1	0^{r}

Semifinals
3	(Italy) F Cobolli	6	6
(Bosnia and Herzegovina) D Džumhur	3	0

== Qualifying ==
=== Seeds ===
1. (Georgia (country)) Nikoloz Basilashvili (first round)
2. (Spain) Martín Landaluce (first round)
3. (France) Ugo Blanchet (qualifying competition)
4. (Kazakhstan) Timofey Skatov (qualified)
5. (Moldova) Radu Albot (qualifying competition, lucky loser)
6. (Bolivia) Murkel Dellien (first round)
7. (Austria) Filip Misolic (qualified)
8. (France) Sascha Gueymard Wayenburg (qualifying competition)

=== Qualifiers ===
1. (Monaco) Valentin Vacherot
2. (Slovakia) Martin Kližan
3. (Austria) Filip Misolic
4. (Kazakhstan) Timofey Skatov

=== Lucky loser ===
1. (Moldova) Radu Albot

=== Qualifying draw ===
==== First qualifier ====
First round
1	(Georgia (country)) Nikoloz Basilashvili	2	7^{10}	4
(Monaco) Valentin Vacherot	6	6^{8}	6
WC	(Romania) Luca Preda	6	6
6	(Bolivia) Murkel Dellien	2	0

Qualifying competition
(Monaco) Valentin Vacherot	6	6
WC	(Romania) Luca Preda	2	3

==== Second qualifier ====
First round
2	(Spain) Martín Landaluce	2	6	4
(Slovakia) Martin Kližan	6	3	6
(Sweden) Elias Ymer	4	6^{6}
8	(France) Sascha Gueymard Wayenburg	6	7^{8}

Qualifying competition
(Slovakia) Martin Kližan	6^{5}	6	6
8	(France) Sascha Gueymard Wayenburg	7^{7}	4	3

==== Third qualifier ====
First round
3	(France) Ugo Blanchet	6	7
Alt	(Romania) Cezar Crețu	4	5
(France) Matteo Martineau	2	6	2
7/Alt	(Austria) Filip Misolic	6	2	6

Qualifying competition
3	(France) Ugo Blanchet	2	2
7/Alt	(Austria) Filip Misolic	6	6

==== Fourth qualifier ====
First round
4	(Kazakhstan) Timofey Skatov	6	6
Alt	(Ukraine) Oleg Prihodko	4	3
WC	(Romania) Ștefan Adrian Andreescu	6	3	2
5	(Moldova) Radu Albot	4	6	6

Qualifying competition
4	(Kazakhstan) Timofey Skatov	6	7^{7}
5	(Moldova) Radu Albot	1	6^{3}
