= 2026 Țiriac Open – Doubles =

Doubles
- 2026 Țiriac Open

Final
- Champions: (France) Sadio Doumbia (France) Fabien Reboul
- Runners-up: (Czech Republic) Adam Pavlásek (Czech Republic) Patrik Rikl
- Score: 6–1, 6–4

Details
- Draw: 16 (2 WC)
- Seeds: 4

Events
Singles	Doubles
- Romanian Open

Sadio Doumbia and Fabien Reboul defeated Adam Pavlásek and Patrik Rikl in the final, 6–1, 6–4 to win the doubles tennis title at the 2026 Romanian Open. It was their second title at the event (after 2024), and they did not lose a set en route.

Marcel Granollers and Horacio Zeballos were the reigning champions, but did not participate this year. As a result, Neal Skupski regained the ATP No. 1 doubles ranking from Zeballos after losing it in Miami.

== Seeds ==
1. (France) Sadio Doumbia / (France) Fabien Reboul (champions)
2. (Austria) Alexander Erler / (Austria) Lucas Miedler (quarterfinals)
3. (India) Yuki Bhambri / (New Zealand) Michael Venus (semifinals)
4. (Germany) Constantin Frantzen / (Netherlands) Robin Haase (quarterfinals)

== Draw ==
Key

- Q = Qualifier
- WC = Wild card
- LL = Lucky loser
- Alt = Alternate
- ITF = ITF entry
- PR = Protected ranking
- SR = Special ranking
- SE = Special exempt
- JE = Junior exempt
- JR = Junior Accelerator Programme entrant
- CO = College Accelerator Programme entrant
- NG = Next Gen Accelerator Program entrant
- w/o = Walkover
- r = Retired
- d = Defaulted

=== Draw ===
First round
1	(France) S Doumbia (France) F Reboul	6	6
(India) A Chandrasekar (Japan) T Yuzuki	3	4
(Germany) J Schnaitter (Germany) M Wallner	6	4	[9]
(Belgium) S Gillé (Netherlands) S Verbeek	0	6	[11]
3	(India) Y Bhambri (New Zealand) M Venus	6	3	[10]
(Hungary) F Marozsán (Kazakhstan) A Shevchenko	4	6	[3]
(Portugal) N Borges (Romania) V Cornea	6	6
WC	(Romania) ȘH Haita (Romania) RT Pieleanu	3	2
(Czech Republic) A Pavlásek (Czech Republic) P Rikl	6	6
(Chinese Taipei) R Ho (Germany) H Jebens	4	4
(Canada) C Harper (United Kingdom) D Stevenson	6	1	[5]
4	(Germany) C Frantzen (Netherlands) R Haase	3	6	[10]
(India) S Balaji (Austria) N Oberleitner	2	6	[12]
WC	(Romania) A Jecan (Romania) B Pavel	6	1	[10]
(Ecuador) G Escobar (United Kingdom) M Willis	3	4
2	(Austria) A Erler (Austria) L Miedler	6	6

Quarterfinals
1	(France) S Doumbia (France) F Reboul	6	7^{7}
(Belgium) S Gillé (Netherlands) S Verbeek	2	6^{1}
3	(India) Y Bhambri (New Zealand) M Venus	6	2	[10]
(Portugal) N Borges (Romania) V Cornea	4	6	[4]
(Czech Republic) A Pavlásek (Czech Republic) P Rikl	6	4	[10]
4	(Germany) C Frantzen (Netherlands) R Haase	4	6	[7]
(India) S Balaji (Austria) N Oberleitner	7	7^{7}
2	(Austria) A Erler (Austria) L Miedler	5	6^{2}

Semifinals
1	(France) S Doumbia (France) F Reboul	7^{7}	6
3	(India) Y Bhambri (New Zealand) M Venus	6^{4}	4
(Czech Republic) A Pavlásek (Czech Republic) P Rikl	7^{7}	7^{7}
(India) S Balaji (Austria) N Oberleitner	6^{5}	6^{5}

Final
1	(France) S Doumbia (France) F Reboul	6	6
(Czech Republic) A Pavlásek (Czech Republic) P Rikl	1	4
