= 2025 Țiriac Open – Doubles =

Doubles
- 2025 Țiriac Open

Final
- Champions: (Spain) Marcel Granollers (Argentina) Horacio Zeballos
- Runners-up: (Germany) Jakob Schnaitter (Germany) Mark Wallner
- Score: 7–6^{(7–3)}, 6–4

Details
- Draw: 16 (2 WC)
- Seeds: 4

Events
Singles	Doubles
← 2024 ·	Romanian Open	· 2026 →

Marcel Granollers and Horacio Zeballos won the doubles title at the 2025 Țiriac Open, defeating Jakob Schnaitter and Mark Wallner in the final, 7–6^{(7–3)}, 6–4.

Sadio Doumbia and Fabien Reboul were the defending champions, but lost in the semifinals to Schnaitter and Wallner.

== Seeds ==
1. (Spain) Marcel Granollers / (Argentina) Horacio Zeballos (champions)
2. (Belgium) Sander Gillé / (Poland) Jan Zieliński (quarterfinals)
3. (United Kingdom) Jamie Murray / (Czech Republic) Adam Pavlásek (semifinals)
4. (France) Sadio Doumbia / (France) Fabien Reboul (semifinals)

== Draw ==
=== Key ===
- Q = Qualifier
- WC = Wild card
- LL = Lucky loser
- Alt = Alternate
- ITF = ITF entry
- PR = Protected ranking
- SR = Special ranking
- SE = Special exempt
- JE = Junior exempt
- JR = Junior Accelerator Programme entrant
- CO = College Accelerator Programme entrant
- NG = Next Gen Accelerator Program entrant
- w/o = Walkover
- r = Retired
- d = Defaulted

=== Draw ===
First round
1	(Spain) M Granollers (Argentina) H Zeballos	6	6
WC	(Romania) C Crețu (Romania) B Pavel	3	3
(Romania) V Cornea (Germany) A Mies	6^{3}	6	[13]
(Netherlands) R Haase (Germany) H Jebens	7^{7}	4	[15]
3	(United Kingdom) J Murray (Czech Republic) A Pavlásek	7^{7}	7^{10}
(Spain) Í Cervantes (Spain) P Martínez	6^{3}	6^{8}
(Argentina) M Navone (Argentina) C Ugo Carabelli	2	6	[1]
(Sweden) A Göransson (Netherlands) S Verbeek	6	3	[10]
(Poland) K Drzewiecki (Poland) P Matuszewski	3	6^{3}
WC	(Romania) M Copil (Romania) L Preda	6	7^{7}
(France) G Jacq (Brazil) O Luz	3	2
4	(France) S Doumbia (France) F Reboul	6	6
(Brazil) M Demoliner (Netherlands) M Middelkoop	6^{2}	6^{3}
(Germany) J Schnaitter (Germany) M Wallner	7^{7}	7^{7}
(Argentina) S Báez (Argentina) F Comesaña	5	1
2	(Belgium) S Gillé (Poland) J Zieliński	7	6

Quarterfinals
1	(Spain) M Granollers (Argentina) H Zeballos	6	7
(Netherlands) R Haase (Germany) H Jebens	1	5
3	(United Kingdom) J Murray (Czech Republic) A Pavlásek	2	7^{7}	[10]
(Sweden) A Göransson (Netherlands) S Verbeek	6	6^{2}	[8]
WC	(Romania) M Copil (Romania) L Preda	2	2
4	(France) S Doumbia (France) F Reboul	6	6
(Germany) J Schnaitter (Germany) M Wallner	6	7^{9}
2	(Belgium) S Gillé (Poland) J Zieliński	2	6^{7}

Semifinals
1	(Spain) M Granollers (Argentina) H Zeballos	6	6
3	(United Kingdom) J Murray (Czech Republic) A Pavlásek	2	4
4	(France) S Doumbia (France) F Reboul	2	6	[8]
(Germany) J Schnaitter (Germany) M Wallner	6	2	[10]

Final
1	(Spain) M Granollers (Argentina) H Zeballos	7^{7}	6
(Germany) J Schnaitter (Germany) M Wallner	6^{3}	4
