= 2025 Țiriac Open =

- Date: 31 March–6 April
- Edition: 23rd
- Category: ATP 250 tournaments
- Draw: 28S / 16D
- Surface: Clay / outdoor
- Location: Bucharest, Romania
- Venue: Centrul Național de Tenis

Champions

Singles
- (Italy) Flavio Cobolli

Doubles
- (Spain) Marcel Granollers / (Argentina) Horacio Zeballos
← 2024 ·	Romanian Open	· 2026 →

The 2025 Țiriac Open presented by UniCredit Bank , was a tennis tournament played on outdoor clay courts in Bucharest, Romania, from 31 March to 6 April 2025. It was the 23rd edition of the Romanian Open tournament, and part of the ATP 250 tournaments of the 2025 ATP Tour.

== Champions ==
=== Singles ===
- (Italy) Flavio Cobolli def. (Argentina) Sebastián Báez 6–4, 6–4

=== Doubles ===
- (Spain) Marcel Granollers / (Argentina) Horacio Zeballos def. (Germany) Jakob Schnaitter / (Germany) Mark Wallner, 7–6^{(7–3)}, 6–4

== Singles main draw entrants ==
=== Seeds ===
Country	Player	Rank^{1}	Seed
ARG	Sebastián Báez	36	1
ESP	Pedro Martínez	40	2
ITA	Flavio Cobolli	43	3
CHI	Nicolás Jarry	47	4
ESP	Roberto Bautista Agut	50	5
~~HUN~~	~~Fábián Marozsán~~	~~59~~	~~6~~
ARG	Mariano Navone	62	7
ARG	Camilo Ugo Carabelli	65	8

- ^{1} Rankings are as of 17 March 2025.

=== Other entrants ===
The following players received wildcards into the singles main draw:

- (France) Richard Gasquet
- (Romania) Filip Cristian Jianu
- (Switzerland) Stan Wawrinka

The following players received entry from the qualifying draw:

- (Slovakia) Martin Kližan
- (Austria) Filip Misolic
- (Kazakhstan) Timofey Skatov
- (Monaco) Valentin Vacherot

The following player received entry as a lucky loser:

- (Moldova) Radu Albot

=== Withdrawals ===
- (Serbia) Miomir Kecmanović → replaced by (Chinese Taipei) Tseng Chun-hsin
- (Hungary) Fábián Marozsán → replaced by (Moldova) Radu Albot
- (France) Corentin Moutet → replaced by (Canada) Gabriel Diallo

== Doubles main draw entrants ==
=== Seeds ===
Country	Player	Country	Player	Rank^{1}	Seed
ESP	Marcel Granollers	ARG	Horacio Zeballos	21	1
BEL	Sander Gillé	POL	Jan Zieliński	60	2
GBR	Jamie Murray	CZE	Adam Pavlásek	66	3
FRA	Sadio Doumbia	FRA	Fabien Reboul	67	4

- Rankings are as of 17 March 2025.

=== Other entrants ===
The following pairs received wildcards into the doubles main draw:

- (Romania) Marius Copil / (Romania) Luca Preda
- (Romania) Cezar Crețu / (Romania) Bogdan Pavel

=== Withdrawals ===
- (Australia) Matthew Ebden / (Australia) John Peers → replaced by (Romania) Victor Vlad Cornea / (Germany) Andreas Mies
- (Germany) Kevin Krawietz / (Germany) Tim Pütz → replaced by (Brazil) Marcelo Demoliner / (Netherlands) Matwé Middelkoop
- (Croatia) Nikola Mektić / (New Zealand) Michael Venus → replaced by (Spain) Íñigo Cervantes / (Spain) Pedro Martínez
