= 2024 Țiriac Open – Singles =

Singles
- 2024 Țiriac Open

Final
- Champion: (Hungary) Márton Fucsovics
- Runner-up: (Argentina) Mariano Navone
- Score: 6–4, 7–5

Details
- Draw: 28 (4 Q / 3 WC)
- Seeds: 8

Events
Singles	Doubles
← 2016 ·	Romanian Open	· 2025 →

Márton Fucsovics defeated Mariano Navone in the final, 6–4, 7–5 to win the singles tennis title at the 2024 Țiriac Open. It was his second ATP Tour title, following the 2018 Geneva Open.

Fernando Verdasco was the reigning champion from when the tournament was last held in 2016, but did not participate this year.

== Seeds ==
The top four seeds received a bye into the second round.

1. (Argentina) Francisco Cerúndolo (quarterfinals)
2. (Netherlands) Tallon Griekspoor (second round)
3. (United States) Sebastian Korda (second round)
4. (Chile) Alejandro Tabilo (semifinals)
5. (Argentina) Mariano Navone (final)
6. (Italy) Lorenzo Sonego (first round)
7. (Portugal) Nuno Borges (second round)
8. (Spain) Pedro Martínez (quarterfinals)

== Draw ==
=== Key ===
- Q = Qualifier
- WC = Wild card
- LL = Lucky loser
- Alt = Alternate
- ITF = ITF entry
- PR = Protected ranking
- SR = Special ranking
- SE = Special exempt
- JE = Junior exempt
- JR = Junior Accelerator Programme entrant
- CO = College Accelerator Programme entrant
- NG = Next Gen Accelerator Program entrant
- w/o = Walkover
- r = Retired
- d = Defaulted

=== Finals ===
Semifinals
5	(Argentina) Mariano Navone	6	6
Q	(France) Grégoire Barrère	3	4
4	(Chile) Alejandro Tabilo	4	4
(Hungary) Márton Fucsovics	6	6

Final
5	(Argentina) Mariano Navone	4	5
(Hungary) Márton Fucsovics	6	7

=== Top half ===
First round
LL	(France) B Bonzi	4	2
(Argentina) F Coria	6	6
(Italy) L Nardi	3	7^{7}	6^{2}
(Brazil) T Seyboth Wild	6	6^{5}	7^{7}
(Italy) L Darderi	2	3
5	(Argentina) M Navone	6	6
Q	(France) G Barrère	7	6
(Australia) T Kokkinakis	5	3
(Belgium) D Goffin	4	6	3
(Serbia) M Kecmanović	6	3	6
Q	(Spain) C Taberner	1	6	3
8	(Spain) P Martínez	6	3	6

Second round
1	(Argentina) F Cerúndolo	7	6
(Argentina) F Coria	5	1
(Brazil) T Seyboth Wild	3	6	5
5	(Argentina) M Navone	6	2	7
3	(United States) S Korda	4	4
Q	(France) G Barrère	6	6
(Serbia) M Kecmanović	6^{4}	6	3
8	(Spain) P Martínez	7^{7}	3	6

Quarterfinals
1	(Argentina) F Cerúndolo	7	4	5
5	(Argentina) M Navone	5	6	7
Q	(France) G Barrère	6^{2}	6	6
8	(Spain) P Martínez	7^{7}	3	4

Semifinals
5	(Argentina) M Navone	6	6
Q	(France) G Barrère	3	4

=== Bottom half ===
First round
6	(Italy) L Sonego	6^{5}	5
WC	(Brazil) J Fonseca	7^{7}	7
Q	(Moldova) R Albot	7^{7}	4	6
(United States) A Kovacevic	6^{4}	6	1
(France) H Gaston	7^{8}	4	5
(France) A Rinderknech	6^{6}	6	7
7	(Portugal) N Borges	3	7	6
(Switzerland) S Wawrinka	6	5	2
(France) C Moutet	6	6
WC	(Canada) D Shapovalov	4	2
Q	(Monaco) V Vacherot	6^{8}	2
(Hungary) M Fucsovics	7^{10}	6

Second round
WC	(Brazil) J Fonseca	7^{7}	6
Q	(Moldova) R Albot	6^{2}	2
(France) A Rinderknech	3	4
4	(Chile) A Tabilo	6	6
7	(Portugal) N Borges	2	7^{7}	2
(France) C Moutet	6	6^{3}	6
(Hungary) M Fucsovics	7	6
2	(Netherlands) T Griekspoor	5	1

Quarterfinals
WC	(Brazil) J Fonseca	6	6^{5}	4
4	(Chile) A Tabilo	4	7^{7}	6
(France) C Moutet	6	4	1
(Hungary) M Fucsovics	4	6	6

Semifinals
4	(Chile) A Tabilo	4	4
(Hungary) M Fucsovics	6	6

== Qualifying ==
=== Seeds ===
1. (Bosnia and Herzegovina) Damir Džumhur (first round, retired)
2. (France) Grégoire Barrère (qualified)
3. (Moldova) Radu Albot (qualified)
4. (Monaco) Valentin Vacherot (qualified)
5. (Italy) Giulio Zeppieri (first round)
6. (France) Titouan Droguet (first round)
7. (Austria) Filip Misolic (first round)
8. (France) Benjamin Bonzi (qualifying competition, lucky loser)

=== Qualifiers ===
1. (Spain) Carlos Taberner
2. (France) Grégoire Barrère
3. (Moldova) Radu Albot
4. (Monaco) Valentin Vacherot

=== Lucky loser ===
1. (France) Benjamin Bonzi

=== Qualifying draw ===
==== First qualifier ====
First round
1	(Bosnia and Herzegovina) Damir Džumhur	3	0^{r}
Alt	(Spain) Carlos Taberner	6	3
(Czech Republic) Zdeněk Kolář	6	3	6
5	(Italy) Giulio Zeppieri	4	6	3

Qualifying competition
Alt	(Spain) Carlos Taberner	6	6
(Czech Republic) Zdeněk Kolář	2	3

==== Second qualifier ====
First round
2	(France) Grégoire Barrère	6	6
(Romania) Nicholas David Ionel	4	3
WC	(France) Lucas Pouille	6	7^{7}
7	(Austria) Filip Misolic	3	6^{4}

Qualifying competition
2	(France) Grégoire Barrère	6	7
WC	(France) Lucas Pouille	4	5

==== Third qualifier ====
First round
3	(Moldova) Radu Albot	6	6
Alt	(Romania) Cezar Crețu	3	4
Alt	(Romania) Filip Cristian Jianu	6	7^{7}
6	(France) Titouan Droguet	4	6^{4}

Qualifying competition
3	(Moldova) Radu Albot	7^{7}	6
Alt	(Romania) Filip Cristian Jianu	6^{4}	4

==== Fourth qualifier ====
First round
4	(Monaco) Valentin Vacherot	6	6
Alt	(Romania) Bogdan Pavel	1	4
WC	(Romania) Marius Copil	2	4
8	(France) Benjamin Bonzi	6	6

Qualifying competition
4	(Monaco) Valentin Vacherot	6	6
8	(France) Benjamin Bonzi	3	4
