= 2026 Țiriac Open – Singles =

Singles
- 2026 Țiriac Open

Final
- Champion: (Argentina) Mariano Navone
- Runner-up: (Spain) Daniel Mérida
- Score: 6–2, 4–6, 7–5

Details
- Draw: 28 (4 Q / 3 WC)
- Seeds: 8

Events
Singles	Doubles
- Romanian Open

Mariano Navone defeated Daniel Mérida in the final, 6–2, 4–6, 7–5 to win the singles tennis title at the 2026 Țiriac Open. He saved two match points en route to his first ATP Tour title, in the semifinals against Botic van de Zandschulp.

Flavio Cobolli was the reigning champion, but withdrew before the tournament began.

== Seeds ==
The top four seeds received a bye into the second round.

1. (Canada) Gabriel Diallo (second round)
2. (France) Adrian Mannarino (second round)
3. (Hungary) Fábián Marozsán (semifinals)
4. (Portugal) Nuno Borges (second round)
5. (Argentina) Sebastián Báez (second round)
6. (Germany) Daniel Altmaier (quarterfinals)
7. (Argentina) Mariano Navone (champion)
8. (Netherlands) Botic van de Zandschulp (semifinals)

== Draw ==
Key

- Q = Qualifier
- WC = Wild card
- LL = Lucky loser
- Alt = Alternate
- ITF = ITF entry
- PR = Protected ranking
- SR = Special ranking
- SE = Special exempt
- JE = Junior exempt
- JR = Junior Accelerator Programme entrant
- CO = College Accelerator Programme entrant
- NG = Next Gen Accelerator Program entrant
- w/o = Walkover
- r = Retired
- d = Defaulted

=== Finals ===
Semifinals
7	(Argentina) Mariano Navone	5	7^{7}	7
8	(Netherlands) Botic van de Zandschulp	7	6^{3}	5
3	(Hungary) Fábián Marozsán	7^{7}	3	1
Q	(Spain) Daniel Mérida	6^{4}	6	6

Final
7	(Argentina) Mariano Navone	6	4	7
Q	(Spain) Daniel Mérida	2	6	5

=== Top half ===
First round
Q	(Slovakia) A Molčan	6	6
(Italy) M Arnaldi	3	1
WC	(Romania) A Boitan	3	5
(Denmark) E Møller	6	7
Alt	(Australia) C O'Connell	4	6^{8}
7	(Argentina) M Navone	6	7^{10}
(Bosnia and Herzegovina) D Džumhur	6	4	7^{7}
WC	(Romania) FC Jianu	3	6	6^{4}
(Kazakhstan) A Shevchenko	6	6
WC	(Romania) RD Țurcanu	2	4
(Italy) F Maestrelli	3	2
8	(Netherlands) B van de Zandschulp	6	6

Second round
1	(Canada) G Diallo	2	2
Q	(Slovakia) A Molčan	6	6
(Denmark) E Møller	2	1
7	(Argentina) M Navone	6	6
4	(Portugal) N Borges	6^{1}	4
(Bosnia and Herzegovina) D Džumhur	7^{7}	6
(Kazakhstan) A Shevchenko	5	1
8	(Netherlands) B van de Zandschulp	7	6

Quarterfinals
Q	(Slovakia) A Molčan	6	2	3
7	(Argentina) M Navone	3	6	6
(Bosnia and Herzegovina) D Džumhur	3	3
8	(Netherlands) B van de Zandschulp	6	6

Semifinals
7	(Argentina) M Navone	5	7^{7}	7
8	(Netherlands) B van de Zandschulp	7	6^{3}	5

=== Bottom half ===
First round
6	(Germany) D Altmaier	6	6
(Spain) P Martínez	1	4
Q	(Georgia (country)) N Basilashvili	4	2
(Croatia) D Prižmić	6	6
Q	(Greece) S Sakellaridis	6	6
(United Kingdom) J Choinski	3	4
5	(Argentina) S Báez	6	6
(Lithuania) V Gaubas	3	1
(Spain) R Bautista Agut	1	6	1
(France) T Droguet	6	1	6
Alt	(Finland) O Virtanen	6^{4}	7	5
Q	(Spain) D Mérida	7^{7}	5	7

Second round
6	(Germany) D Altmaier	3	7^{7}	7^{9}
(Croatia) D Prižmić	6	6^{1}	6^{7}
Q	(Greece) S Sakellaridis	6^{3}	5
3	(Hungary) F Marozsán	7^{7}	7
5	(Argentina) S Báez	4	4
(France) T Droguet	6	6
Q	(Spain) D Mérida	4	6	6
2	(France) A Mannarino	6	2	2

Quarterfinals
6	(Germany) D Altmaier	2	6^{5}
3	(Hungary) F Marozsán	6	7^{7}
(France) T Droguet	6	6^{7}	1^{r}
Q	(Spain) D Mérida	4	7^{9}	3

Semifinals
3	(Hungary) F Marozsán	7^{7}	3	1
Q	(Spain) D Mérida	6^{4}	6	6

== Qualifying ==
=== Seeds ===
1. (Georgia (country)) Nikoloz Basilashvili (qualified)
2. (Spain) Daniel Mérida (qualified)
3. (United Kingdom) Billy Harris (first round)
4. (Chinese Taipei) Tseng Chun-hsin (first round)
5. (Italy) Stefano Travaglia (first round)
6. (Austria) Joel Schwärzler (qualifying competition)
7. (Austria) Jurij Rodionov (qualifying competition)
8. (United Kingdom) Jay Clarke (qualifying competition)

=== Qualifiers ===
1. (Georgia (country)) Nikoloz Basilashvili
2. (Spain) Daniel Mérida
3. (Slovakia) Alex Molčan
4. (Greece) Stefanos Sakellaridis

=== Qualifying draw ===
==== First qualifier ====
First round
1	(Georgia (country)) Nikoloz Basilashvili	6	7
(Poland) Daniel Michalski	4	5
(United Kingdom) George Loffhagen	6	6^{5}	2
7	(Austria) Jurij Rodionov	4	7^{7}	6

Qualifying competition
1	(Georgia (country)) Nikoloz Basilashvili	6	0	6
7	(Austria) Jurij Rodionov	4	6	3

==== Second qualifier ====
First round
2	(Spain) Daniel Mérida	6	6
Alt	(Georgia (country)) Saba Purtseladze	1	2
WC	(Romania) Ștefan Horia Haita	3	6	6^{0}
6	(Austria) Joel Schwärzler	6	3	7^{7}

Qualifying competition
2	(Spain) Daniel Mérida	6	6
6	(Austria) Joel Schwärzler	2	2

==== Third qualifier ====
First round
3	(United Kingdom) Billy Harris	1	6^{3}
(Slovakia) Alex Molčan	6	7^{7}
WC	(Romania) Gabriel Ghețu	4	3
8	(United Kingdom) Jay Clarke	6	6

Qualifying competition
(Slovakia) Alex Molčan	6	5	7^{7}
8	(United Kingdom) Jay Clarke	3	7	6^{4}

==== Fourth qualifier ====
First round
4	(Chinese Taipei) Tseng Chun-hsin	4	3
(Greece) Stefanos Sakellaridis	6	6
(Bulgaria) Dimitar Kuzmanov	7^{7}	6
5	(Italy) Stefano Travaglia	6^{0}	1

Qualifying competition
(Greece) Stefanos Sakellaridis	6	7^{8}
(Bulgaria) Dimitar Kuzmanov	3	6^{6}
