= 2024 Țiriac Open =

- Date: 15–21 April
- Edition: 22nd
- Category: ATP 250 tournaments
- Draw: 28S / 16D
- Surface: Clay / outdoor
- Location: Bucharest, Romania
- Venue: Năstase & Marica Sports Club

Champions

Singles
- (Hungary) Márton Fucsovics

Doubles
- (France) Sadio Doumbia / (France) Fabien Reboul
← 2016 ·	Romanian Open	· 2025 →

The 2024 Țiriac Open was a tennis tournament played on outdoor clay courts in Bucharest, Romania, from 15 to 21 April 2024. It was the 22nd edition of the Romanian Open tournament, and part of the ATP 250 tournaments of the 2024 ATP Tour. It was the first edition of the tournament since 2016.

== Finals ==
=== Singles ===
(Hungary) Márton Fucsovics defeated (Argentina) Mariano Navone, 6–4, 7–5

- It was Fucsovics' only singles title of the year and the 2nd of his career.

=== Doubles ===
(France) Sadio Doumbia / (France) Fabien Reboul defeated (Finland) Harri Heliövaara / (United Kingdom) Henry Patten, 6–3, 7–5

== Singles main draw entrants ==
=== Seeds ===
Country	Player	Rank^{1}	Seed
ARG	Francisco Cerúndolo	22	1
NED	Tallon Griekspoor	26	2
USA	Sebastian Korda	27	3
CHI	Alejandro Tabilo	45	4
ARG	Mariano Navone	51	5
ITA	Lorenzo Sonego	57	6
POR	Nuno Borges	58	7
ESP	Pedro Martínez	60	8

- ^{1} Rankings are as of 8 April 2024.

=== Other entrants ===
The following players received wildcards into the singles main draw:

- (Brazil) João Fonseca
- ~~(France) Richard Gasquet~~
- (Canada) Denis Shapovalov

The following players received entry from the qualifying draw:

- (Moldova) Radu Albot
- (France) Grégoire Barrère
- (Spain) Carlos Taberner
- (Monaco) Valentin Vacherot

The following player received entry as a lucky loser:

- (France) Benjamin Bonzi

=== Withdrawals ===
- (Serbia) Laslo Djere → replaced by (Belgium) David Goffin
- (France) Richard Gasquet → replaced by (France) Benjamin Bonzi
- (France) Adrian Mannarino → replaced by (France) Corentin Moutet
- (France) Gaël Monfils → replaced by (France) Hugo Gaston

== Doubles main draw entrants ==
=== Seeds ===
Country	Player	Country	Player	Rank^{1}	Seed
GBR	Lloyd Glasspool	NED	Jean-Julien Rojer	51	1
FRA	Sadio Doumbia	FRA	Fabien Reboul	64	2
FIN	Harri Heliövaara	GBR	Henry Patten	96	3
COL	Nicolás Barrientos	BRA	Rafael Matos	96	4

- Rankings are as of 8 April 2024.

=== Other entrants ===
The following pairs received wildcards into the doubles main draw:

- (Romania) Marius Copil / (Romania) Bogdan Pavel
- (Romania) Cezar Crețu / (Romania) Filip Cristian Jianu

The following pair received entry as alternates:

- (Argentina) Federico Coria / (Argentina) Mariano Navone

=== Withdrawals ===
- (United Kingdom) Julian Cash / (United States) Robert Galloway → replaced by (Argentina) Federico Coria / (Argentina) Mariano Navone
- (France) Adrian Mannarino / (France) Fabrice Martin → replaced by (France) Fabrice Martin / (Ukraine) Denys Molchanov
