= Tursunov =

Tursunov is a Central Asian surname. Notable people with the surname include:

- Dmitry Tursunov (born 1982), Russian tennis player and coach
- Sanzhar Tursunov (born 1986), Uzbek football player
- Anvar-qori Tursunov, Uzbek imam of the Kukeldash mosque in Tashkent
- Furkat Tursunov (born 1991), Turkmen football player
- Tolibjon Tursunov, Uzbek fund manager
