= Stan Wawrinka =

Swiss tennis player (born 1985)

- Wawrinka at the 2026 Swiss Indoors
- Full name: Stanislas Wawrinka
- Country (sports): Switzerland
- Residence: Stans, Switzerland
- Born: 28 March 1985 (age 41) Lausanne, Switzerland
- Height: 1.83 m (6 ft 0 in)
- Turned pro: 2002
- Retired: 27 October 2026
- Plays: Right-handed (one-handed backhand)
- Coach: Dimitri Zavialoff (2002–2010); Peter Lundgren (2010–2012); Richard Krajicek (2016); Paul Annacone (2017); Daniel Vallverdú (2019–2022); Magnus Norman (2013–2017, 2018–2020, 2022–2026)
- Prize money: US $38,742,890: 11th all-time in earnings
- Official website: stanwawrinka.com

Singles
- Career record: 590–395 (59.9%)
- Career titles: 16
- Highest ranking: No. 3 (27 January 2014)

Grand Slam singles results
- Australian Open: W (2014)
- French Open: W (2015)
- Wimbledon: QF (2014, 2015)
- US Open: W (2016)

Other tournaments
- Tour Finals: SF (2013, 2014, 2015)
- Olympic Games: 2R (2008, 2024)

Doubles
- Career record: 81–109 (42.6%)
- Career titles: 3
- Highest ranking: No. 88 (2 February 2015)

Grand Slam doubles results
- Australian Open: 3R (2006)
- French Open: 3R (2006)
- Wimbledon: 1R (2006, 2007)
- US Open: 1R (2005)

Other doubles tournaments
- Olympic Games: W (2008)

Team competitions
- Davis Cup: W (2014)
Medal record
Representing Switzerland
Olympic Games
Gold medal – first place	2008 Beijing	Doubles

Stanislas "Stan" Wawrinka (French: [stanislas vavʁiŋka]; (Note: English: /wəˈrɪŋkə/ or /væˈvrɪŋkə/.) born 28 March 1985) is a Swiss former professional tennis player. He was ranked as high as world No. 3 in singles by the ATP. Wawrinka won 16 ATP Tour–level singles titles, including three majors at the 2014 Australian Open, 2015 French Open, and the 2016 US Open, where he defeated the world No. 1 player in the final on all three occasions. He also won an Olympic gold medal in men's doubles at the 2008 Beijing Olympics partnering Roger Federer, and was pivotal in the Swiss team's victory at the 2014 Davis Cup.

Wawrinka's other achievements include reaching the final of the 2017 French Open, winning a Masters 1000 title at the 2014 Monte-Carlo Masters, and reaching three other Masters finals (at 2008 Rome, 2013 Madrid and 2017 Indian Wells). He considers clay his best and favorite surface, and his serve and backhand his best shots. John McEnroe once said that Wawrinka has one of the most powerful backhands ever, and in 2009 deemed it "the best one-handed backhand in the game." He has been described by The Economist as "tennis's great latecomer", owing to finding his greatest success in his late 20s and early 30s. Prior to the 2014 French Open, he was granted a formal change in his name from "Stanislas Wawrinka" to "Stan Wawrinka", using the abbreviated name in tournament draws and press conferences.

== Early life ==
Wawrinka was born in Switzerland to a German father and Swiss mother. He holds dual Swiss–German citizenship. His father Wolfram Wawrinka, a farmer and social worker, is German of Czech ancestry. Wawrinka's paternal great-grandfather originated from Silesia—the border region between Poland and the former Czechoslovakia—and the surname originates with the Polish language. It is related to Wawrzyniec, the Polish version of Laurence, or Laurentius. Wawrinka's mother, Isabelle, an educator, is Swiss. She works as a biodynamic farmer helping disabled people and, along with her husband, runs her in-laws' farm. The property, known as "Ferme du Château", is near Lausanne, and attached to the castle of Saint-Barthélemy. The farm assists people with mild to moderate intellectual disabilities, and people with depression or drug and alcohol problems. Here Wawrinka grew up with his elder brother, Jonathan, and his two younger sisters, Djanaée and Naélla, who are students and tennis players. Wawrinka attended the Rudolf Steiner School in Crissier.

== Career ==
Wawrinka started playing tennis at the age of eight, and played once a week until he was eleven, when he started to practice three times a week. At that time, his coach changed his backhand stroke from two-handed to one-handed. Wawrinka stopped attending regular schooling at age 15 to focus full-time on tennis. However, he continued his schooling by distance education with the French organization CNED, which offered him greater flexibility.

Wawrinka turned professional in 2002 at the age of 17. He was coached from age 8 to 25 (ending in June 2010) by Dimitri Zavialoff.

Wawrinka is a three-time major champion, Olympic champion, and Davis Cup champion. He achieved a top-10 ranking by the ATP for the first time in May 2008, and first reached his career peak of world No. 3 on 27 January 2014, at the same time as he became the Swiss No. 1.

Wawrinka has reached four Grand Slam singles finals in his career to date, winning three: the 2014 Australian Open, the 2015 French Open and the 2016 US Open; each time he defeated the reigning world No. 1 in the final (Rafael Nadal once and Novak Djokovic twice, respectively). In doubles and team tennis for Switzerland, he has won a gold medal in the men's doubles event at the 2008 Summer Olympics, partnering with Roger Federer, and the Davis Cup in 2014. He is the second Swiss man to win a major after Federer. He played in the longest doubles match in history at the 2013 Davis Cup, in a tie against the Czech Republic, partnering Marco Chiudinelli.

=== 2002–2003: Juniors and turning pro ===
Wawrinka started playing international junior events at age 14 and entered the satellite circuit the following year. In 2002 Wawrinka became professional. In 2003 he had his first steps on the tour and ended the year ranked No. 169. He compiled an outstanding junior career, winning the Junior French Open in 2003 and reaching as high as No. 7 in the junior world rankings in June 2003.

=== 2004–2007: Early career and first title ===
On 11 July, at Gstaad, Wawrinka progressed into his first ever career final, in doubles, with Marc Rosset as his partner. The Swiss pair lost in the final to Leander Paes and David Rikl. That year Wawrinka had his Davis Cup debut with the Swiss National Team. Wawrinka lost his first match against Victor Hănescu in a dead rubber. Switzerland won the tie 3–2 against Romania and progressed into the World Group quarterfinals. He finished the year ranked No. 162 in the world rankings.

Wawrinka had his Grand Slam debut at the French Open. He won against 22nd seed and Olympic gold medalist Nicolás Massú in the first round, in four sets. In the second round, Wawrinka came from two sets down to defeat James Blake. His run ended in the third round losing in four sets to the eventual runner-up Mariano Puerta.

After the French Open, Wawrinka had his first Wimbledon experience but lost in the first round to Fabrice Santoro in four sets. Wawrinka had his first singles final at the Swiss Open, but lost to Gastón Gaudio.

At the US Open, Wawrinka defeated Rajeev Ram and Mariano Puerta in five sets before losing in the third round to Nicolás Massú. By the end of 2005, he hovered just inside the top 50.

In July, Wawrinka won his first ATP title, at the Croatia Open Umag, when his opponent in the final, Novak Djokovic, retired through fatigue.

In October, Wawrinka reached a then career-high ranking of No. 29.

In the Australian Open, Wawrinka reached the third round and was beaten by second seed Rafael Nadal, losing in straight sets. He showed some impressive backhand skills, but was unable to deal with Nadal's heavy game.

He suffered a three-month setback, tearing a tendon in his right knee while practicing for the Swiss Davis Cup team's tie against Spain in February.

In the French Open Wawrinka pushed seventh seed Ivan Ljubičić to four sets in the second round. He also claimed wins over Guillermo Cañas and Juan Ignacio Chela en route to a meeting with Rafael Nadal in the final of the Mercedes Cup in Stuttgart in July. Nadal defeated Wawrinka in straight sets.

In the US Open, Wawrinka reached the fourth round, a stage he had never reached previously in a Grand Slam event, defeating 25th seed Marat Safin in straight sets in the second round. In the fourth round, he was ousted by Juan Ignacio Chela in five sets.

=== 2008–2012: Top 10, first Masters final, Olympic Gold ===
By reaching the final of the Masters Series event in Rome, Wawrinka entered the top 10 for the first time. He lost in the final to Novak Djokovic, despite taking the opening set.

In the Olympics, Wawrinka teamed with Roger Federer in men's doubles. They beat the favoured Americans Bob and Mike Bryan in the semifinals in straight sets; then in the final, defeated Simon Aspelin and Thomas Johansson of Sweden in four sets to win the gold medal.

Wawrinka reached the fourth round of the US Open, where British player Andy Murray defeated him in straight sets.

Wawrinka lost to Rafael Nadal in the fourth round at the Miami Masters in Key Biscayne. Nadal came from behind in both sets to beat Wawrinka in two tie-breaks.

At the Monte-Carlo Masters, Wawrinka defeated No. 2 Roger Federer in straight sets, an upset which halted the chance of a fourth straight Nadal-Federer final in Monte Carlo.

At the French Open Wawrinka defeated Nicolas Devilder in five sets and Nicolás Massú in straight sets. He lost to Nikolay Davydenko in the third round in four sets.

At Wimbledon, in the third round he defeated 21-year-old Jesse Levine, who had upset Marat Safin in the first round. The Sunday Times reviewed Wawrinka's performance in the match by opining that he is "a strange player, clearly talented but short of match fitness and as clumsy on court as Federer is graceful." Wawrinka was defeated by Andy Murray in five sets in the fourth round. The match was also a debut usage of the new roof on Centre Court and was the latest match at Wimbledon, lasting until 22:37 GMT.

Wawrinka played in the Davis Cup tie with Italy and won in his first match against Andreas Seppi in straight sets.

Wawrinka started his 2010 season by reaching the final of the Chennai Open, losing to Marin Čilić in two tie-breaks. This was Wawrinka's fifth consecutive loss in an ATP final. He reached the third round at the Australian Open, losing to Čilić again. Wawrinka returned to the ATP Tour at the Sony Ericsson Open after his wife gave birth to their daughter. He defeated Kevin Anderson, before losing to Mikhail Youzhny in the third round. He started his clay-court season in Casablanca at the 2010 Grand Prix Hassan II. After receiving a first-round bye, he defeated Slovak qualifier Martin Kližan in the second round. In the quarterfinals, he defeated wildcard Reda El Amrani in straight sets. In the semifinals, he defeated Italian Potito Starace in three sets to advance to his second ATP final of 2010. In the final, he defeated Romanian Victor Hănescu in straight sets to win his second ATP Tournament. With this tournament win, he snapped a five-match losing streak in ATP finals and a 3½-year title drought. It was also the first professional singles final Wawrinka won, as his previous ATP victory occurred due to a retirement.

Wawrinka became the 13th seed at the Monte-Carlo Masters and defeated Victor Hănescu in the first round in a rematch of the Casablanca final. He then beat Latvian Ernests Gulbis to advance to the third round. He was defeated by Novak Djokovic. Wawrinka reached the quarterfinals in Rome, losing to Rafael Nadal, and the semifinals in Belgrade, losing to John Isner. At the French Open, where he was the 20th seed, he reached the fourth round without dropping a set, defeating Jan Hájek in the first round. In the second round, he defeated German Andreas Beck, and in the third round, he beat Italian Fabio Fognini, before losing to Roger Federer in the fourth round.

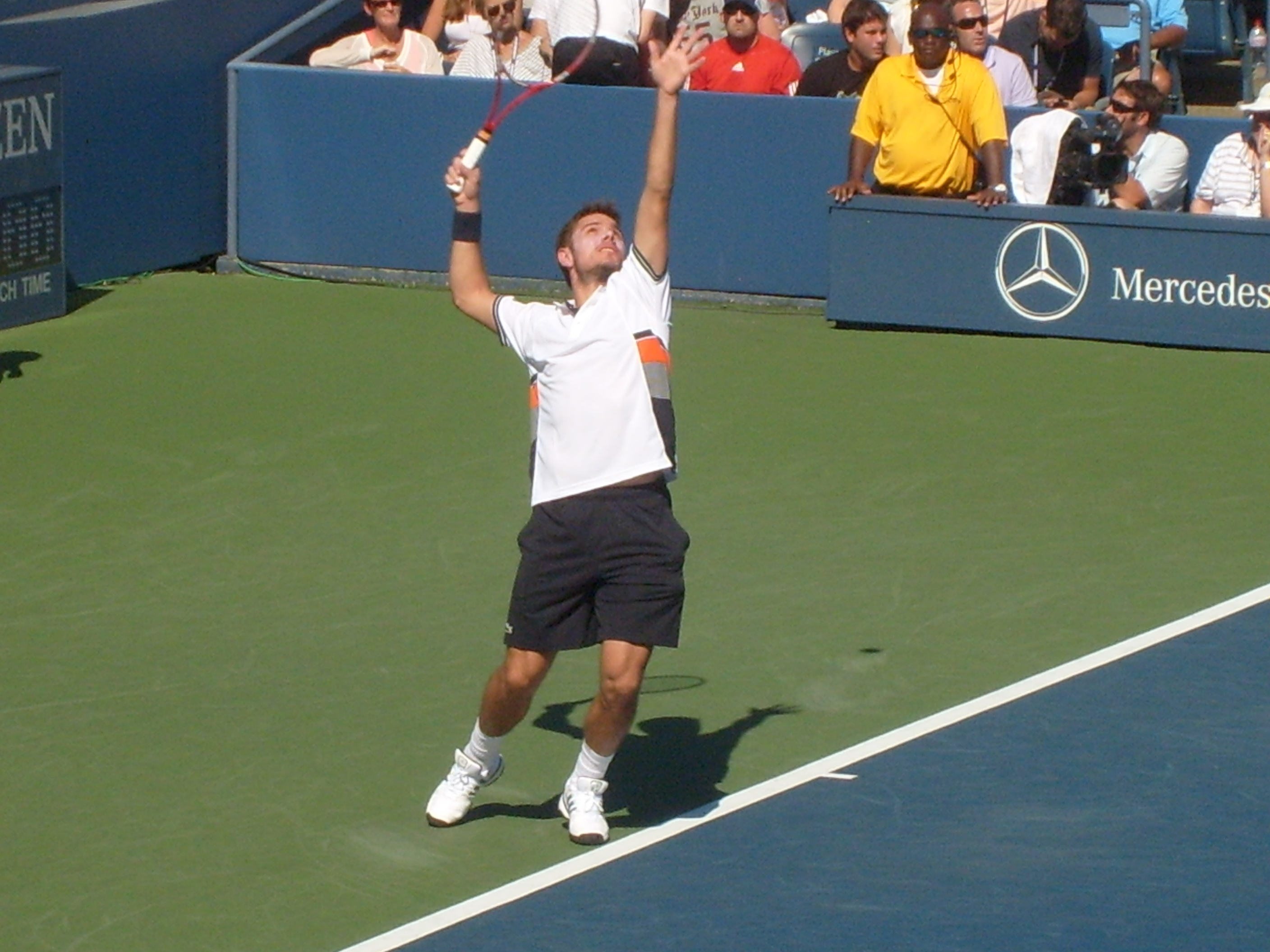
Wawrinka serving during his upset win over Andy Murray at the 2010 US Open

After an unsuccessful grass season, where he lost in the first round of Wimbledon, Wawrinka separated from his coach since childhood and hired Peter Lundgren, former coach of Marat Safin and Federer. The partnership with Lundgren showed its benefits in the US Open, where Wawrinka reached the quarterfinals, beating fourth seed Andy Murray along the way.

Wawrinka started off 2011 by defeating No. 6 Tomáš Berdych along the way to claiming the Chennai Open crown. Wawrinka beat Xavier Malisse in the final in three sets. He advanced to the quarterfinals of the 2011 Australian Open, after defeating Andy Roddick in three sets to set up an all-Swiss quarterfinal with Roger Federer, which he lost in straight sets. He also came back from two sets and a break down to defeat Jo-Wilfried Tsonga in the third round of the French Open, before being defeated by Federer once more. Wawrinka was defeated by Simone Bolelli in the second round of Wimbledon and Donald Young at the same stage of the US Open.

In September, Wawrinka announced that he had parted ways with Lundgren. He played the rest of the season without a coach.

At the Swiss Indoors tournament, Wawrinka made it to the semifinals, after defeating Florian Mayer in the quarterfinals. In an all-Swiss semifinal, he was defeated by Roger Federer in straight sets.

Wawrinka started the season in Chennai, where he made the quarterfinals, before being defeated by Go Soeda.

At the Australian Open, he made it to the third round, defeating Benoît Paire and Marcos Baghdatis, before being eliminated by Nicolás Almagro.

In his Davis Cup tie against Mardy Fish in February, he lost in five sets. Later in February, he traveled to Buenos Aires and Acapulco, where he made to the semifinals, before losing again to Almagro and Fernando Verdasco, respectively.

In Monte Carlo, he defeated three Spaniards, Feliciano López, Pablo Andújar, and Almagro, making it to the quarterfinals before losing to another Spaniard, No. 2 Rafael Nadal, the eventual champion. In doubles, he teamed with Victor Troicki, and they made it to the quarterfinals.

In Estoril, he made it to the semifinals, but was defeated by Juan Martín del Potro.

Wawrinka made the fourth round of the French Open after defeating Flavio Cipolla, Andújar, and Gilles Simon. He was defeated by Jo-Wilfried Tsonga in the fourth round, once again coming from two sets down to take the match into a fifth set and recovering a 4–1 deficit in the decider before Tsonga finally prevailed.

Wawrinka then had a series of first-round exits at Wimbledon, Gstaad, and in the Summer Olympics, where he lost to the eventual gold medallist Andy Murray. He was Team Switzerland national flag bearer at the Parade of Nations. He teamed with Roger Federer again in doubles at the Olympics, but they were eliminated in the second round.

He made the semifinals of the Masters 1000 event in Cincinnati, before he was defeated by Federer, the eventual champion. Wawrinka again also played doubles with Jarkko Nieminen, and they were eliminated in the second round.

At the US Open, Wawrinka reached the fourth round, but was forced to retire in his match against second seed Novak Djokovic due to illness.

=== 2013: Breakthrough ===
Wawrinka teamed with Frenchman Benoît Paire to win the doubles title at the Chennai Open against the German team of Andre Begemann and Martin Emmrich.

At the Australian Open, he made it to the fourth round. He lost a gruelling five-set epic against Novak Djokovic which lasted just over five hours, finally losing in the 22nd game of the fifth set. "It definitely ranks right at the top", said Djokovic, after his victory over the Swiss. "One of the longest, most interesting, and most exciting matches I have played in my career." Wawrinka stated that "It's by far my best match I ever [played], especially in five sets against the No. 1 player."

In the first round of the Davis Cup on 2 February 2013, he played the longest ATP doubles match in history. He and Marco Chiudinelli were defeated by Lukáš Rosol and Tomáš Berdych of the Czech Republic in 7 hours and 2 minutes, including a 46-game-long final set. The match was the second-longest ATP match ever (singles and doubles combined).

Wawrinka made it to the final of the Copa Claro in Buenos Aires, losing to David Ferrer in that final.

Wawrinka won the fourth title of his career at the Portugal Open, where he defeated the top seed and No. 4 David Ferrer. This was his first title since January 2011.

In the Madrid Masters, Wawrinka's run of success continued, with a three-set win over Jo-Wilfried Tsonga in the quarterfinals. The following day, he defeated Tomáš Berdych, also in three sets, to advance to his second Masters 1000 final against Rafael Nadal. With this victory, he also re-entered the Top 10 at No. 10, and stayed inside the Top 10 till 2018. He lost the final in straight sets.

He made it to the quarterfinals of the French Open for the first time after recovering from two sets down to beat Richard Gasquet in the fourth round, but subsequently lost to defending and seven-time champion Rafael Nadal in straight sets.

He started the grass-court season at the Topshelf Open in 's-Hertogenbosch and made it to the final, where he lost to grass-court specialist Nicolas Mahut. At Wimbledon, he lost in the first round to Lleyton Hewitt.

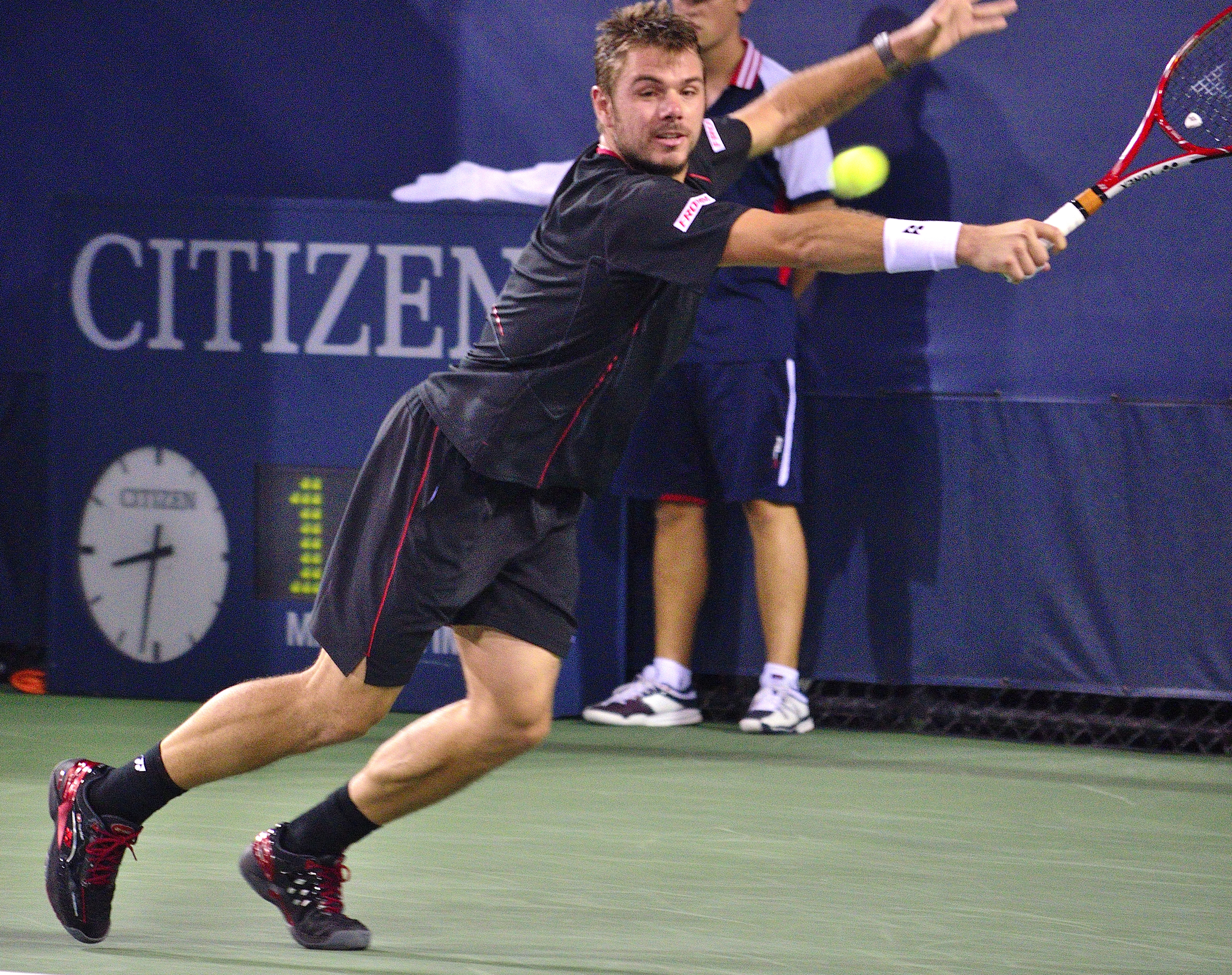
Wawrinka at the 2013 US Open

In the US Open, Wawrinka reached his first Grand Slam semifinal, losing to top seed Novak Djokovic, again in five tightly contested sets. Previously he had defeated No. 5 Tomáš Berdych in four sets in the fourth round and No. 3 and defending champion Andy Murray in straight sets in the quarterfinals.

After his Grand Slam breakthrough, Wawrinka continued to display solid form, reaching the semifinals in Kuala Lumpur, where he lost to Julien Benneteau, and quarterfinals of Masters 1000 tournaments in Shanghai and Paris, losing to Rafael Nadal and Novak Djokovic, respectively.

Wawrinka went to the ATP World Tour Finals for the first time in his career. He made an impact on the tournament, beating Tomáš Berdych and David Ferrer in round-robin matches. Although he lost to Rafael Nadal in straight sets for the twelfth time in his career, both sets were finished in tight tiebreaks, and the Swiss actually won more points in the match. Wawrinka advanced in second place to the semifinals, where he met Novak Djokovic and lost to him for the fourth time that year.

=== 2014: First major title, world No. 3 ===
Wawrinka began his ninth season on the ATP World Tour with a win at the Chennai Open in India, winning this tournament for the second time in his career, defeating Édouard Roger-Vasselin in the final in straight sets.

At the Australian Open, Wawrinka beat Andrey Golubev and Alejandro Falla in the first two rounds, then had a walkover when Vasek Pospisil pulled out of their third-round match, followed by a straight-set win over Tommy Robredo. Wawrinka's quarterfinal opponent was Novak Djokovic, and this time Wawrinka won in five sets, taking the deciding fifth set 9–7 after being a break down. The victory ended a 14-match losing streak against the three-time reigning champion. He then faced off against another first-time Australian Open semifinalist, Tomáš Berdych, winning the match in four tight sets (including three tiebreaks). In the ensuing final, he defeated No. 1 Rafael Nadal in four sets, thus denying Nadal's attempt for the distinction of being the only active men's tennis player to hold at least two titles at each of the four Grand Slam tournaments (an achievement that was ultimately attained by Djokovic in the 2021 French Open and Nadal himself in the 2022 Australian Open). The victory was his first win over Nadal in 13 attempts (having never won a set against him in their previous 12 meetings), and also made him the first man since Sergi Bruguera in 1993 to beat both of the top two seeds en route to a Grand Slam title. (Bruguera defeated No. 1 Pete Sampras and No. 2 Jim Courier at the 1993 French Open). This was also only the second time since 2005 that a player outside of the 'Big Four' (Federer, Nadal, Djokovic, and Murray) had won a Grand Slam title, and the first since Juan Martín del Potro won the US Open in 2009. In addition, Wawrinka became the first player to defeat both Nadal and Djokovic in a single Grand Slam tournament. He is also the second Swiss man to win a Grand Slam singles title after Federer.

Due to his championship victory at the Australian Open, Wawrinka for the first time in his career reached the top five, becoming No. 3, and the top-ranked Swiss player in the world ahead of Federer for the first time.

Playing for Switzerland in the first round of the Davis Cup against Serbia, he defeated Dušan Lajović in four sets in the second rubber. Switzerland went on to win the tie 3–2 (after an unassailable 3–0 lead) to reach their first Davis Cup quarterfinal since 2004.

After a one-month break, he next played at the BNP Paribas Open in Indian Wells as the third seed. In his opening round (after receiving a first-round bye due to his seeding), he overcame Ivo Karlović in straight sets. In the third round, he defeated Andreas Seppi dropping only two games. In the fourth round, his 13-match winning streak from the start of the season came to an end against Kevin Anderson.

At the Miami Masters, he made it to the fourth round after defeating Daniel Gimeno Traver and Édouard Roger-Vasselin, before losing to an in-form Alexandr Dolgopolov.

Wawrinka returned to Switzerland's Davis Cup team for their quarterfinal against Kazakhstan. Wawrinka was beaten in his first match by Andrey Golubev, then (after Federer had levelled the tie by beating Mikhail Kukushkin) he and Federer lost their doubles match to Golubev and Aleksandr Nedovesov. However, Wawrinka then came from a set down to beat Kukushkin and level the match again. Federer won the deciding rubber to send Switzerland to the semifinals, where they would play Italy.

At the Monte-Carlo Masters, Wawrinka crushed Marin Čilić in the second round, losing only two games in the process. He then received a walkover in the third round to Nicolás Almagro. In the quarterfinal, Wawrinka defeated Milos Raonic in straight sets to secure his second semifinal appearance in the principality. Wawrinka defeated David Ferrer in the semifinals to become one of the few players to reach the finals of all 3 Masters tournament on clay. The stage was set for the first all-Swiss final in fourteen years, as he would take on his friend Roger Federer. In the first set, Federer secured an early break and prevented any chances of Wawrinka breaking and closed out the opener. However, Wawrinka fought back to take a close second set in a tiebreak, and after that, Wawrinka gained the momentum. He did not relinquish his advantage, winning his first Masters 1000 title on his third attempt. In doing so, Wawrinka took over the top spot in the 'Race to London'. Thus far, Wawrinka had defeated Djokovic, Nadal, and Federer that season, whom he had a 2–15, 0–12, and 1–13 record respectively, coming into the 2014 season. However, Wawrinka had less success in his next two tournaments, losing in the second round in Madrid to Dominic Thiem and the third round of Rome to Tommy Haas. Wawinka then suffered a first-round defeat to Guillermo García López in the French Open.

Later that month, Wawrinka participated in the Aegon Championships, knocking out Marcos Baghdatis, Sam Querrey, and Marinko Matosevic without dropping a set, before losing to eventual champion Grigor Dimitrov in the semifinals.

Wawrinka was seeded fifth for Wimbledon due to the tournament's seeding process being a combination of world ranking and recent grass court form, meaning Wawrinka (who had lost in the first round the previous two years) was seeded lower than No. 5 Andy Murray and No. 4 Roger Federer as they had won the title the previous two seasons. Wawrinka proceeded to have his best-ever run at the tournament, reaching the quarterfinals for the first time, dropping just one set in the process. He faced Federer in the first all-Swiss men's quarterfinal in Wimbledon history, losing in four close sets.

Wawrinka was seeded third for the US Open due to Nadal's withdrawal. He reached his fifth Grand Slam quarterfinal from the last seven tournaments, defeating Tommy Robredo in four sets in the fourth round, having survived set points in the third-set tiebreaker. He was eventually beaten by finalist Kei Nishikori in five sets.

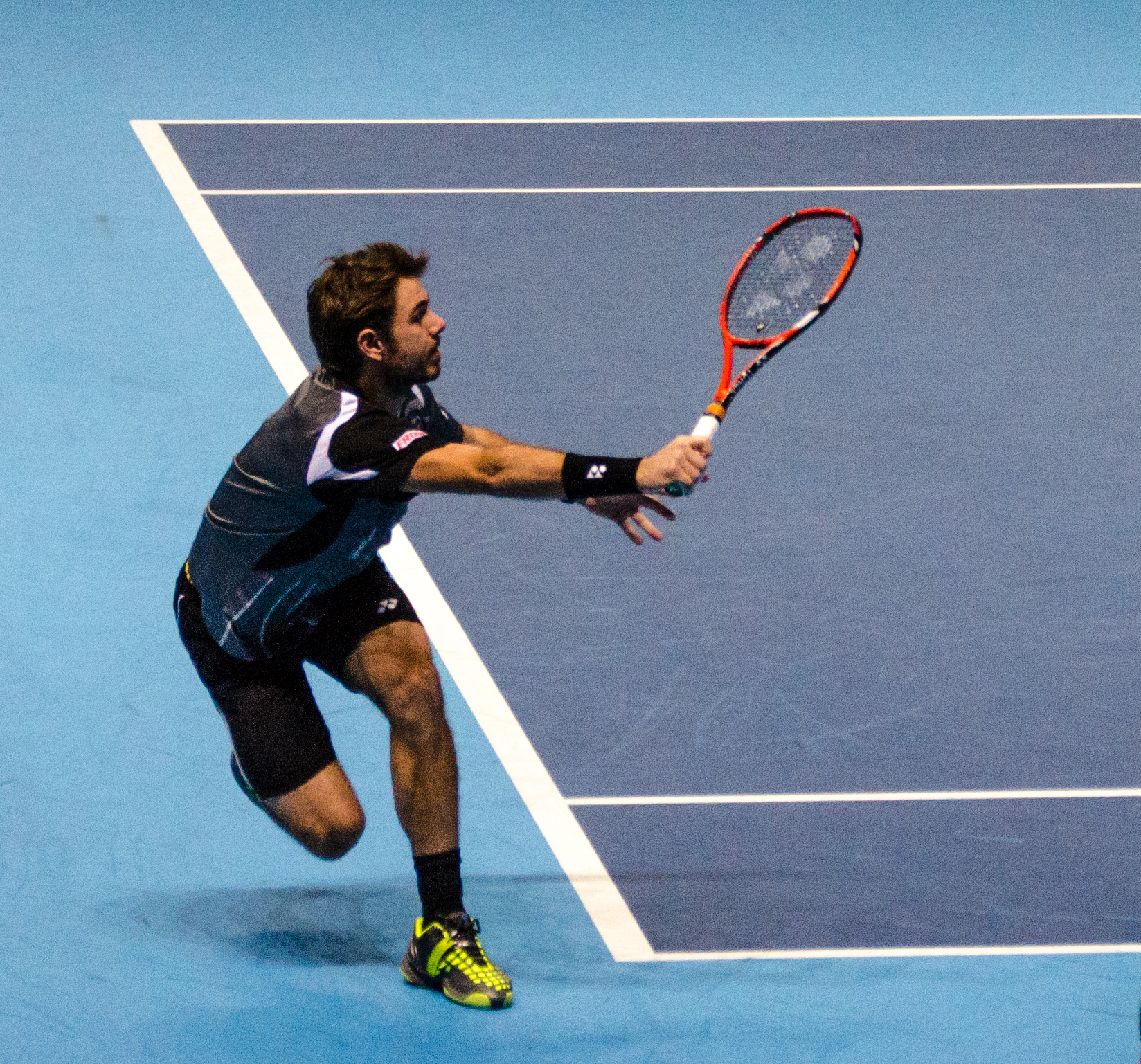
Wawrinka at the 2014 ATP World Tour Finals

Wawrinka lost in early-round matches at three consecutive tournaments in October. At the Japan Open Tennis Championships, he was seeded first, but was defeated in the first round in straight sets by Tatsuma Ito of Japan, then ranked No. 103 on the ATP tour. The following week at the Shanghai Rolex Masters tournament, he was seeded fourth, but was defeated in three sets by unseeded Gilles Simon in the second round, after having had a bye in the first round. He was up a break in the third set against Simon, but won only one of the final five games. At the time, Wawrinka was ranked No. 4 and Simon No. 29 on the ATP rankings. In Basel, he was beaten in the first round by Mikhail Kukushkin in three sets. At the Paris Masters 1000, Wawrinka recorded his first win since the US Open against Dominic Thiem. However, he fell in three tight sets to Kevin Anderson in the next round.

Wawrinka had a good run in the ATP World Tour Finals, where he beat Tomáš Berdych and Marin Čilić. He lost to Djokovic in the next round-robin match, but progressed to the semifinals. In the semifinals, he faced No. 2 Roger Federer, and after 2 hours he had four match points but failed to convert any of them and lost in three sets. After the match, reports emerged that Federer and Wawrinka had a heated discussion lasting for 10 minutes in the gym at the O2, after officials reportedly told them to resolve their differences after a flare-up in the tunnel. The spat was reportedly caused by Mirka Federer's calling Wawrinka a crybaby.

The pair appeared as friends though when they met for the Davis Cup final. In the final against France, Wawrinka gave his country the perfect start by defeating Jo-Wilfried Tsonga in four sets. Wawrinka then teamed up with Federer to win the doubles rubber and give Switzerland a 2–1 lead going into the final day. The match ended a sequence of four doubles rubbers losses for the pair, and it was their first win together on clay. Wawrinka did not play on the final day, as Federer sealed the tie, by beating Gasquet in straight sets for Switzerland's first Davis Cup title. With the win, Wawrinka became the first player since Andre Agassi in 1992 to win his first Grand Slam title and first Davis Cup in the same season.

=== 2015: French Open champion ===
In January, Wawrinka was crowned champion of the Chennai Open for the third time running, winning against Slovenian player, Aljaž Bedene in the final, after a win against No. 22 David Goffin. At the Australian Open he reached the semifinals again by beating Kei Nishikori in straight sets. In his semifinal, Wawrinka lost to Novak Djokovic in five sets, bringing an end to his Australian Open title defence. As a result of failing to defend his title, Wawrinka dropped from No. 4 in the world rankings pre-tournament to No. 9 post-tournament. On 15 February, he prevailed over Tomáš Berdych in three sets to win the title at the ABN AMRO World Tennis Tournament. He next competed at the Open 13 in Marseille, where he reached the quarterfinals, losing to Sergiy Stakhovsky. He then competed at the Indian Wells Masters, where he lost to Robin Haase in his opening match, after receiving a first-round bye. He next played the Miami Masters in Miami, losing to Adrian Mannarino in straight sets in the third round. As defending champion at the Monte-Carlo Masters, Wawrinka lost to Grigor Dimitrov in the third round. He later lost in the third round at the Mutua Madrid Open, again to Dimitrov. In the Rome Masters, Wawrinka reached the semifinals before being defeated by Federer in straight sets.

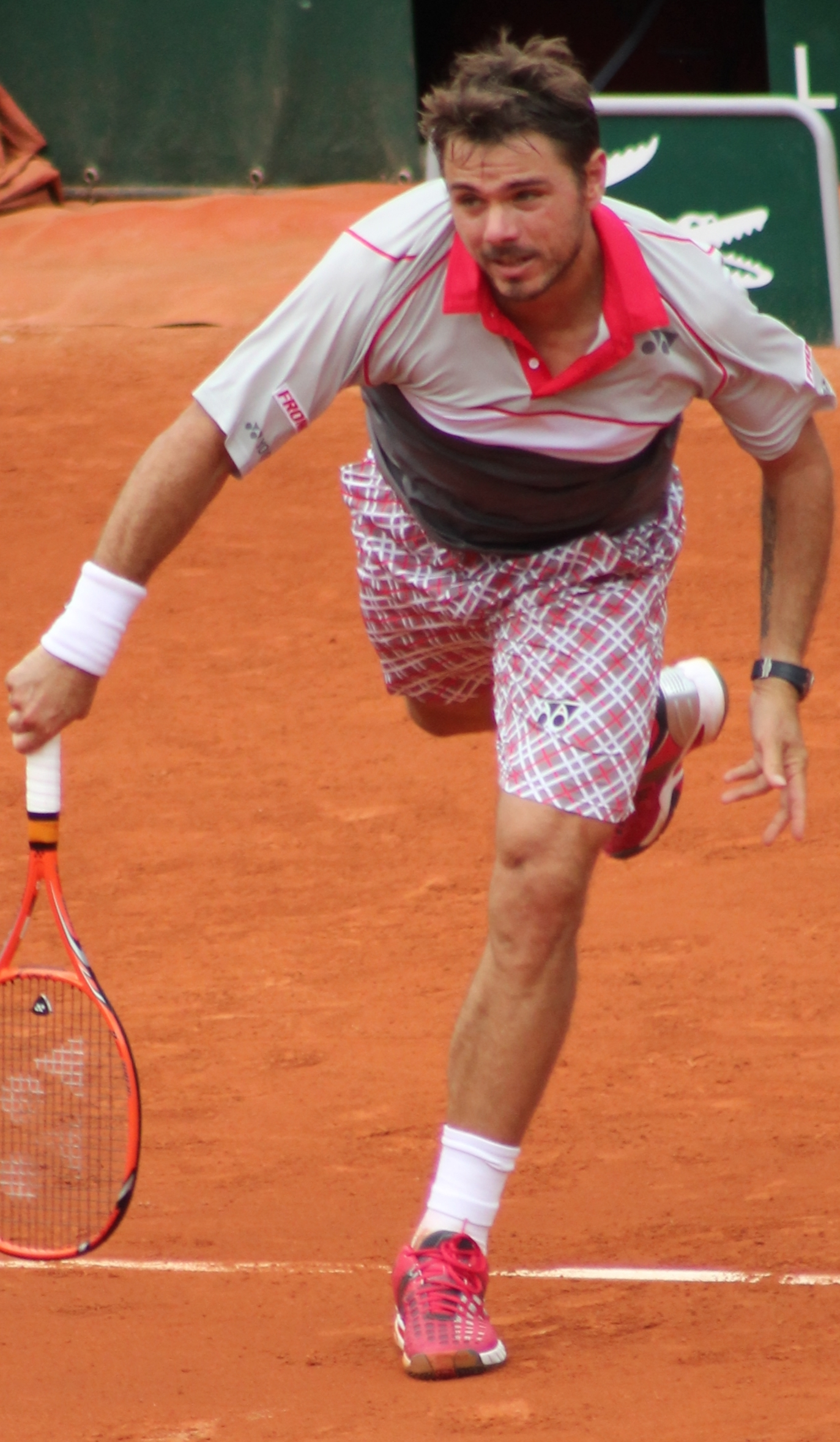
Wawrinka at the 2015 French Open

Wawrinka next competed in the French Open, as the 8th seed. He beat Marsel İlhan and Dušan Lajović in three and four sets, respectively, before beating Steve Johnson and Gilles Simon in straight sets to reach the quarterfinals, and defeated compatriot Roger Federer in straight sets to reach his first Roland Garros semifinal. This was also Wawrinka's first win over Federer in a major tournament. Winning in four sets against Jo-Wilfried Tsonga in the semifinals, he earned his second appearance in a Grand Slam final, this time against top seed Novak Djokovic. He defeated Djokovic in four sets, after being down a break in the fourth set and 0–40 in a subsequent game. He broke Djokovic's service twice in the set, reeling off six of the final seven games of the match. With this victory, Wawrinka claimed his second Grand Slam tournament title, and Djokovic failed to win a personal career Grand Slam. Wawrinka's French Open championship also denied Djokovic the 2015 calendar year Grand Slam, as Djokovic won all other Grand Slam tournaments that year. Mirroring his victory at the 2014 Australian Open, Wawrinka was seeded 8th at this tournament, defeated the 2nd and 1st seeds in the quarterfinals and finals, respectively, clinched the championship match in four sets, and rose five positions in the ATP rankings, back to the No. 4 position, which was his original position at the beginning of the year. This was also the 2nd time since Sergi Bruguera at the 1993 French Open that the champion defeated No. 1 (Novak Djokovic) and No. 2 (Roger Federer) players in the same grand slam (Wawrinka also accomplished this feat at the 2014 Australian Open). Wawrinka is the first man to win Roland Garros after losing in the first round in the previous year since Albert Costa in 2002, and the first former boys' champion to win the men's title since Mats Wilander in 1982.

Wawrinka exited from Queen's Club as the Swiss bowed out of the Aegon Championships in the second round, against eventual runner-up Kevin Anderson. He reached the quarter finals of Wimbledon, the furthest he had ever reached, matching his result from last year, but was ousted by Richard Gasquet in a five-set thriller, despite being up two sets to one.

Wawrinka continued his dominant Grand Slam form at the US Open, with wins over Albert Ramos, Chung Hyeon, Ruben Bemelmans, Donald Young. He then beat South African Kevin Anderson in straight sets in the quarterfinals to advance to the semifinals, where he was dispatched in straight sets by Roger Federer. Wawrinka then helped Switzerland advance to the Davis Cup World Group with a five-set win over Dutchman Thiemo de Bakker in Geneva. He then competed in the Rakuten Japan Open Tennis Championships, entering as the first seed. Wawrinka avenged his loss to Tatsuma Ito at the same tournament the previous year by defeating him in the second round. He eventually advanced to the finals, where he beat Benoît Paire in straight sets and won his fourth title of the season. Wawrinka then entered the Shanghai Rolex Masters, where he defeated former US Open champion Marin Čilić in a three-set battle before losing in straight sets to Rafael Nadal in the quarterfinals. Playing in the Paris Masters, Wawrinka avenged his previous loss to Rafael Nadal in Shanghai with a two set victory. In the semifinals, Wawrinka lost to Novak Djokovic in a three set match. He then matched his performance at the ATP World Tour Finals the previous year by reaching the semifinals in London with round-robin wins over Andy Murray and David Ferrer. In the semifinals, Wawrinka played Roger Federer for the fifth time in the 2015 season, losing in straight sets.

=== 2016: 400th career win, US Open champion ===
Wawrinka started his season at the Chennai Open where he was the two-time defending champion and 1st seed. He started against young wildcard Andrey Rublev. He won in straight sets. Then he played 5th seed Guillermo García López. He also won in straight sets. In the semifinal he played against 3rd seed and good friend Benoît Paire. He won another straight sets match. In the final he played 8th seed and young talent Borna Ćorić. He successfully defended his title without dropping a set the entire tournament.

He then played in the Australian Open where he was the 4th seed. He started against Dmitry Tursunov who was here on a protected ranking. Wawrinka won the first two sets before Tursunov had to retire due to injury. He then played qualifier Radek Štěpánek where he won in straight sets. He then proceeded to the third round where he played Lukáš Rosol. He also won in straight sets to mark his 400th career win. Then in the fourth round he played big serving Canadian and 13th seed Milos Raonic. Despite pushing it to a fifth set he was unable to overcome the Canadian and lost. It also snapped Wawrinka's streak of 6 consecutive quarterfinals or better appearances in Grand Slams.

Wawrinka then played in the Open 13 as the 1st seed. He started against Sergiy Stakhovsky who had defeated him here last year. He won after saving a few matchpoints. He then proceeded to the quarterfinals. He had a disappointing loss to good friend Benoît Paire. Wawrinka then played in the Dubai Tennis Championships as the 2nd seed. He won against Sergiy Stakhovsky, qualifier Franko Škugor and Philipp Kohlschreiber. In the semifinals Nick Kyrgios retired in set two. In the final he played surprise finalist Marcos Baghdatis and won in straight sets. He then played in the first masters 1000 of the year at the Indian Wells Masters as the 3rd seed. Wawrinka beat Illya Marchenko and Andrey Kuznetsov but lost to 15th seed David Goffin in a third set tiebreak.

At the Miami Open Wawrinka lost in the first round to Andrey Kuznetsov. Next up was the Monte-Carlo Masters with wins against Philipp Kohlschreiber and Gilles Simon. He then suffered a two set loss to the eventual champion, Rafael Nadal. Wawrinka then suffered another first round exit at the Madrid Open to Nick Kyrgios. He then competed at the Rome Masters as the 4th seed. He had a three set win against Benoît Paire but then had a three set loss to Juan Mónaco, who was here with a protected ranking. At the Geneva Open Wawrinka had two easy wins against Albert Ramos Viñolas and Pablo Carreño Busta, and a three set victory over Lukáš Rosol. In the final he played Marin Čilić. He won his 3rd title of the year with a tight straight sets win.

His next tournament was the second major of the year, the French Open, as the 3rd seed and the defending champion. Against Lukáš Rosol Wawrinka was down two sets to one, but came through in five sets. Wins over Taro Daniel, Jérémy Chardy and Viktor Troicki sent Wawrinka to the quarterfinals, where he dispatched Albert Ramos Viñolas in straight sets. In the semifinals he played 2nd seed Andy Murray. He lost in four sets. He then played at Queens in the Aegon Championships as the second seed. However he suffered a straight sets defeat to No. 53 Fernando Verdasco in the first round. His next tournament was at the Wimbledon Championships, as the 4th seed. In the first round he faced Taylor Fritz and won in four sets. However, he was beaten in the second round by Juan Martín del Potro on the comeback in four sets. After missing the Olympics due to a back injury, Wawrinka played at the Cincinnati Masters. However, he would lose to Grigor Dimitrov in two sets in the third round.

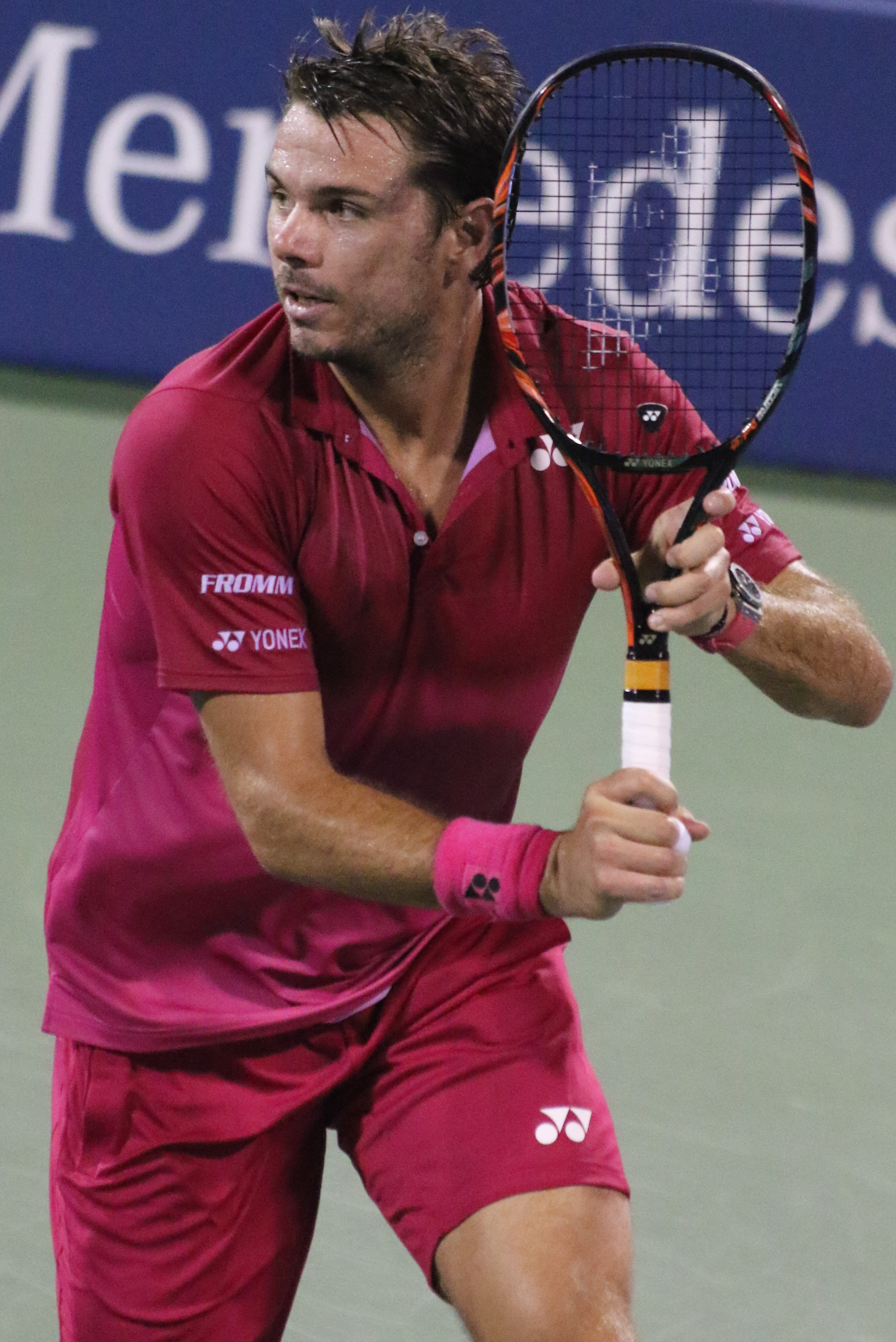
Wawrinka at the 2016 US Open

Prior to the start of the U.S. Open, Wawrinka returned to the Top 3 in the ATP rankings due to Roger Federer being unable to defend his title in Cincinnati due to injury. In the first round he faced Fernando Verdasco, beating the Spaniard in straight sets. He then faced qualifier Alessandro Giannessi, also winning in three sets. He then played a four-hour match in the third round against British player Daniel Evans, which saw Wawrinka save a match point in the fourth set tiebreak, before beating Evans in five sets. He then defeated Illya Marchenko in four sets in the fourth round. In his fourth consecutive quarterfinal appearance at the U.S. Open, he defeated Juan Martín del Potro in four sets. He defeated Kei Nishikori in the semifinals in four sets and went on to defeat Novak Djokovic in four sets to win the 2016 U.S. Open, his third major title in as many years and his eleventh consecutive win in a championship final. With this victory, Wawrinka improved his record to 2–0 in major finals against Djokovic and he remained the only player to defeat Djokovic in Djokovic's twelve Grand Slam finals dating back to the 2014 Wimbledon championships. Much as Wawrinka's 2015 French Open victory denied Djokovic the 2015 calendar year Grand Slam, his win at this tournament denied Djokovic claiming three Grand Slam victories in successive years (2015 and 2016). Wawrinka defeated the No. 1 player in the finals of all three of his grand slam titles. The 2016 US Open final was the only match that year in which Djokovic won the first set but lost the match (53–1).

He then entered St Petersburg Open, and reached the final, losing to rising teenager Alexander Zverev Jr. in 3 sets. This gifted Zverev his first ATP World Tour title and also snapped Wawrinka's streak of 11 consecutive finals won. Wawrinka did not achieve more notable results for the rest of the season, losing to Gilles Simon in the third round of Shanghai Rolex Masters, Mischa Zverev in the quarterfinals of Swiss Indoors, and Jan-Lennard Struff in the second round of Paris Masters after holding matchpoint.

Wawrinka then played his final tournament of the season at the ATP World Tour Finals, and for the first time failed to make to the semifinals, losing his first round robin match in straight sets to Kei Nishikori, then beating Marin Čilić in 2 tiebreaks, and losing to No. 1 Andy Murray in straight sets. As a result of this and Milos Raonic reaching the semifinals, Raonic overtook Wawrinka as No. 3 at the conclusion of the tournament. Wawrinka would finish the season as No. 4 for the third straight year.

=== 2017: French Open finalist, knee injury ===
To start his 2017 campaign, Wawrinka chose not to defend his Chennai Open title (he had won the previous 3 editions), and played in Brisbane instead. He reached the semifinals, losing to No. 5 Kei Nishikori in straight sets. At the Australian Open he barely escaped a first round exit by beating Slovak player Martin Kližan after being down a break in the 5th set. He then played Steve Johnson and beat him in straight sets and played Viktor Troicki in the third round, winning in four sets. In the fourth round, he played Italian Andreas Seppi, beating him in three tight tiebreaks to progress to the quarterfinals. He then beat 12th seed Jo-Wilfried Tsonga in three sets, to set up a semifinal against his compatriot and 17th seed Roger Federer. Wawrinka lost the all-Swiss clash, recovering from a two sets to love deficit and holding numerous breaking points in the opening games of 5th set only to ultimately lose 3–6. Federer went on to win the tournament. Despite the loss this result elevated Wawrinka back to No. 3. Wawrinka was then upset by Damir Džumhur in the first round of the Dubai Duty Free Tennis Championships in straight sets.

At the Indian Wells Masters, Wawrinka was seeded 3rd. After receiving a bye, his first two matches included victories over Paolo Lorenzi and Philipp Kohlschreiber. In the fourth round, Wawrinka came from down a set to beat lucky loser Yoshihito Nishioka in the third set tiebreak after Nishioka served for the match twice. He then beat Dominic Thiem in three sets to reach his ninth ATP Masters 1000 semifinal. He defeated first-time Masters semifinalist Pablo Carreño Busta in straight sets to reach his first final at Indian Wells, as well as his first Masters final on hard court. He was defeated by Roger Federer in the final in straight sets. Wawrinka was notably the only person to break Federer's serve during the entire tournament, after he broke Federer's opening service game in the second set.

At the Miami Masters Wawrinka was the top seed at a Masters 1000 tournament for the first time in his career, after No. 1 Andy Murray and No. 2 Novak Djokovic both withdrew due to elbow injuries. He was defeated in the fourth round by Alexander Zverev Jr. in three sets.

At the French Open, Wawrinka defeated Jozef Kovalík, Alexandr Dolgopolov, Fabio Fognini, Gaël Monfils and Marin Čilić in straight sets. In a rematch of last year's semifinal he played Andy Murray in the semis. However this year Wawrinka was victorious in five sets. In the final he was defeated by Nadal in straight sets, his first loss in a major final.

Wawrinka then entered Wimbledon with the chance to complete his career Grand Slam, but lost his opening match against Daniil Medvedev, a Russian player who was making his Wimbledon debut, in four sets. There was speculation that Wawrinka had an injured knee, and Wawrinka confirmed it by announcing that he would be taking time off to heal. On 4 August 2017, Wawrinka announced that he would undergo surgery to repair the damage on his knee, and that he would miss the remainder of the 2017 tennis season.

=== 2018: Continued injuries, return to tour ===
He made his return to the tour at the 2018 Australian Open, where he lost in the second round to Tennys Sandgren in straight sets. His next tournament was the Sofia Open, where he lost in the semifinals to Mirza Bašić. Then he entered the ABN AMRO World tournament, where he lost in the first round to wildcard Tallon Griekspoor. His next tournament was the Open 13 in Marseille, France. He retired during his first match, trailing Ilya Ivashka by one set, at 1–1 during the second set because of his knee injury.

After missing almost three months due to his injury, Wawrinka returned in the 2018 Italian Open but lost in the first round to Steve Johnson in straight sets. He then played at the 2018 Geneva Open where he was the two-time defending champion but his title defense ended in a straight sets defeat to Márton Fucsovics in the quarterfinals. In the 2018 French Open, he was seeded 23rd, but lost in the first round to Guillermo García López in five sets, which made him drop from 30 to 263 in the rankings. He entered Queens as a wildcard, losing to fifth seed Sam Querrey in the second round. He gained entry to Eastbourne as a wildcard, where, in the first round, he played Andy Murray, who was playing just his second tournament after a year-long absence from the sport. Wawrinka lost in straight sets.

Wawrinka was unseeded at Wimbledon, but upset 6th-seed Grigor Dimitrov in the first round in four sets. He then lost to Thomas Fabbiano in straight sets.

Entering Washington as a wildcard, he narrowly lost to Donald Young in the first round. He also received wildcard entry to the 2018 Rogers Cup, where he defeated 16th seed Nick Kyrgios in the first round and Márton Fucsovics in the second before being defeated by top seed and eventual champion Rafael Nadal in two close sets. At Cincinnati, he defeated Diego Schwartzman, Kei Nishikori, and Márton Fucsovics before falling to Roger Federer in three sets in the quarterfinals.

Wawrinka entered the 2018 US Open as a wildcard, where he was again drawn against Grigor Dimitrov in the first round. He triumphed in straight sets and advanced to the third round, defeating Ugo Humbert in four sets. He then lost to Milos Raonic in the third round.

Warwinka received a wild card and entered the St Petersburg Open beating Karen Khachanov, Aljaž Bedene and Damir Džumhur before losing to Martin Kližan. He received a wildcard for the 2018 Shanghai Rolex Masters.

=== 2019: Comeback, two finals, 500th career win ===
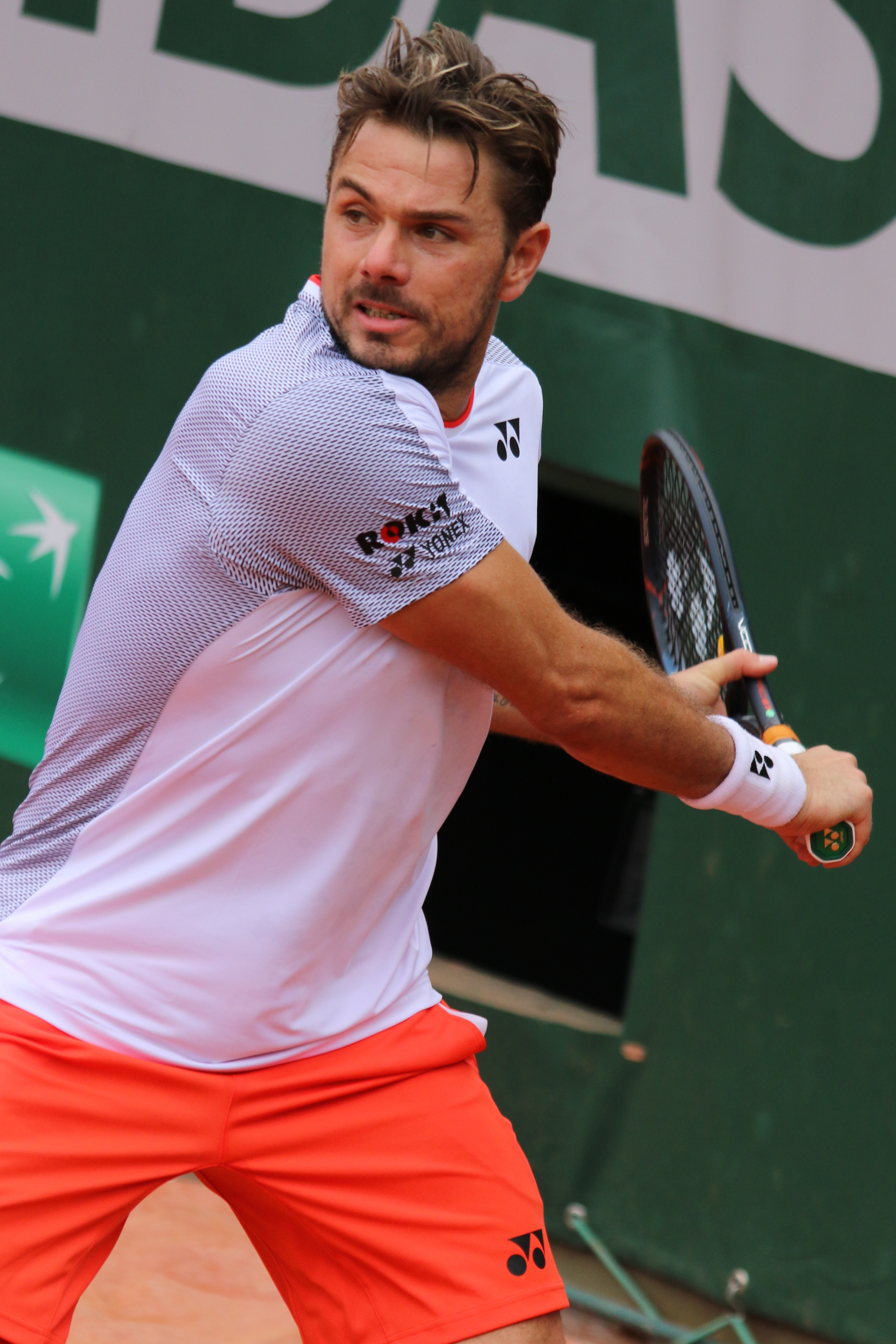
Wawrinka at the 2019 French Open

Wawrinka started his 2019 season at the Qatar Open, where he lost in quarterfinals to eventual champion Roberto Bautista Agut. At the Australian Open, for a second straight grand slam tournament, he was defeated by Raonic in four sets, this time in the second round. At the Rotterdam Open, Wawrinka reached his first tournament final in over 20 months, where he fell to Gaël Monfils in three sets, and this was followed by a three set defeat to Nick Kyrgios in the quarterfinals of the Mexico Open.

Wawrinka was seeded 24th at the French Open. He won his first two matches against Jozef Kovalík and Cristian Garín before beating Grigor Dimitrov for the third time in the last four majors to record his 500th career win. He then defeated Stefanos Tsitsipas in the fourth round in an 'epic' five setter that lasted 5 hours and 9 minutes to advance to his first major quarterfinal in two years. However, he was eliminated by Roger Federer, the third seed, in four close sets.

At the US Open, Wawrinka upset top seed and defending champion Novak Djokovic in the round of 16; Djokovic pulled out after dropping the first two sets. It was their first match since Wawrinka's victory in the 2016 US Open final and marked his third win over Djokovic when he was No. 1 and fifth career win overall over a world No. 1. He went on to lose the quarterfinal to Daniil Medvedev.

=== 2020: Season curtailed by COVID-19 ===
At the 2020 Australian Open, Wawrinka beat Damir Džumhur in four sets in the first round before defeating Andreas Seppi in five sets in the second round. He then progressed to the fourth round after John Isner retired with injury and then upset Daniil Medvedev in five sets to reach the quarterfinals. Wawrinka then lost his quarterfinal match to Alexander Zverev in four sets.

The 2020 French Open was then postponed to September, and Wimbledon was cancelled due to the COVID-19 pandemic. Wawrinka did not participate in the 2020 US Open due to the health situation in New York, one of the worst affected states. At the 2020 French Open, Wawrinka defeated Andy Murray in straight sets and then followed it up with a four-set win over Dominik Koepfer in the second round. He then lost in the third round to Hugo Gaston in five sets.

=== 2021: Hiatus due to surgery ===
At the 2021 Australian Open, Wawrinka defeated Pedro Sousa in straight sets in the first round before losing to Márton Fucsovics in five sets in the second round.

Following early exits in Rotterdam and Doha, he had surgery for a left foot injury. This caused him to miss the clay, grass and hardcourt seasons including the 2021 French Open, Wimbledon and the North American hardcourt swing including the 2021 US Open.

=== 2022: ATP semifinal, 60th Top-10 win, back to top 150 ===
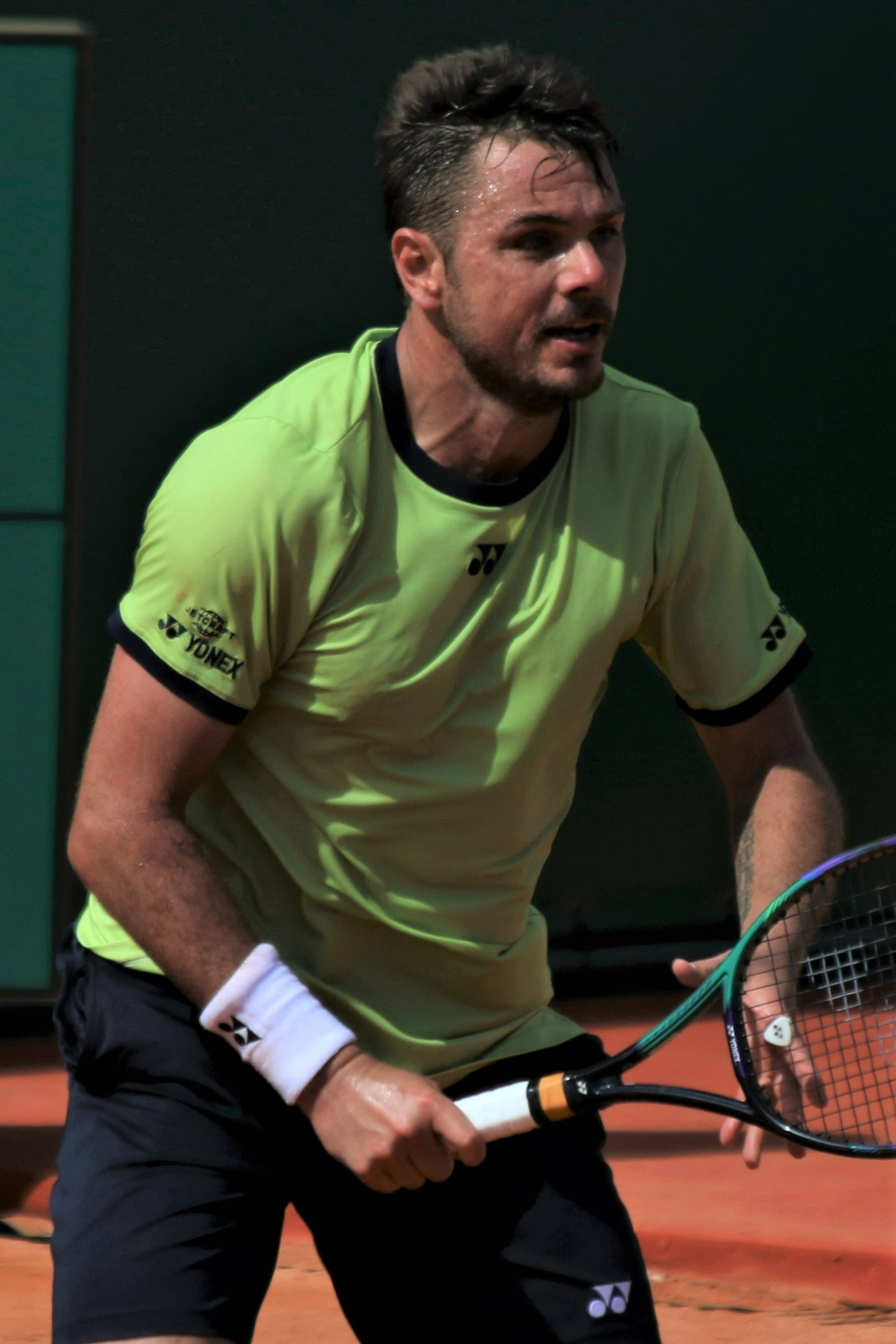
Wawrinka at the 2022 Monte-Carlo Masters

Wawrinka made his return to professional tennis in March at the 2022 Andalucía Challenger, an event on the ATP Challenger Tour. He lost in straight sets to Elias Ymer in the first round. He then played at the Monte-Carlo Masters where he accepted a wildcard into the main draw. He lost to Alexander Bublik in the first round despite winning the first set. Using protected ranking, Wawrinka scored his first two consecutive match wins since 2021 against Reilly Opelka and qualifier Laslo Djere at the Italian Open and next lost in the first round of the French Open to wildcard Corentin Moutet in four sets. At Wimbledon, where he received a wildcard, Wawrinka lost in the first round to Jannik Sinner in four sets.

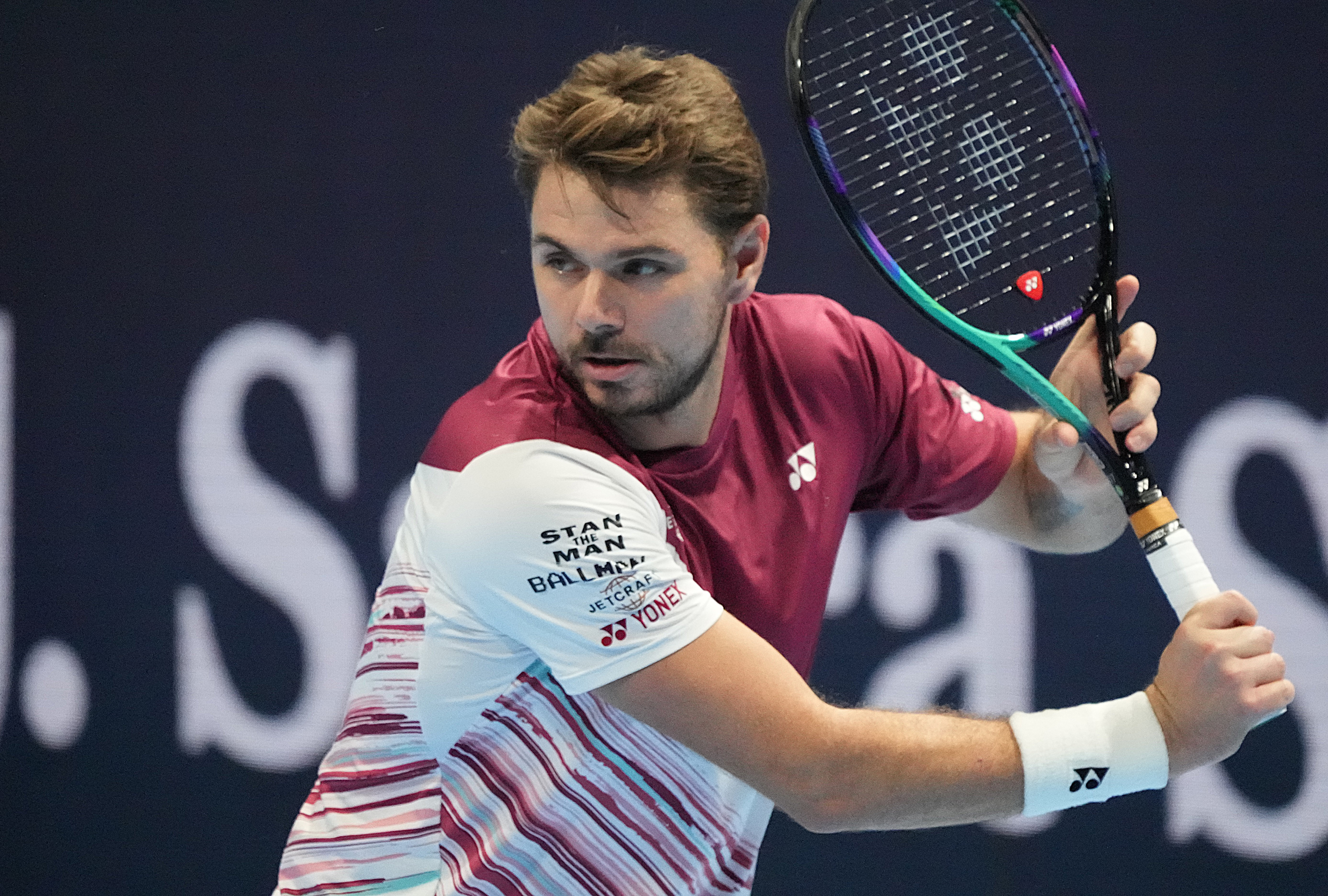
Stan Wawrinka, Basel 2022

At the US Open, using protected ranking, Wawrinka retired during his first round match against Corentin Moutet due to undisclosed reasons. At the 2022 Moselle Open he defeated top seed Daniil Medvedev to reach the quarterfinals as a qualifier. Next he defeated Mikael Ymer to reach his first semifinal in more than two years. As a result he returned to the top 200 climbing more than 90 positions up the rankings. After two straight first round losses at the 2022 Astana Open and at the 2022 European Open both as a wildcard, at his home tournament the 2022 Swiss Indoors, using protected ranking, Wawrinka defeated world No. 3 and second seed Casper Ruud to record his 60th Top-10 win of his career. He became the fourth active man to record 60 Top-10 wins, and the 16th man in the Open Era to do it. As a result he moved 25 positions up in the rankings. Next he won against Brandon Nakashima and climbed 15 positions up to the top 150 in the rankings. He also revealed he has rehired Magnus Norman as his coach.

=== 2023–2024: 70th major event, third-oldest ATP semifinalist ===
In 2023, Wawrinka completed his first full season since 2019. In this season, he achieved his most number of matches played since 2019, highest win percentage since 2020, and reached his first ATP final since 2019. At the Grand Slam level, Wawrinka reached the third round for the first time since 2020 with his wins against Tomás Martín Etcheverry at Wimbledon and US Open in the second round, before losing in straight sets to eventual finalist Novak Djokovic and in four sets to Jannik Sinner, respectively. He concluded his year ranked world No. 49, his highest ranking since 2020.

Wawrinka began his 2023 season at the inaugural United Cup, leading Team Switzerland into the group stage in Brisbane, Australia. He won his first match against Alexander Bublik of Kazakhstan but lost his next match against Hubert Hurkacz of Poland, both in straight sets, ultimately becoming unsuccessful to progress to the host city and elimination stage. His Australian season ended at the 2023 Australian Open, with a first round loss to Alex Molčan in five sets.

Back in Europe, Wawrinka participated in the first round of Davis Cup Qualifying round for Team Switzerland against Team Germany in Trier, Germany. He lost his first match to Alexander Zverev in straight sets but followed this up with a three-set win against Daniel Altmaier which allowed Switzerland to progress to the Davis Cup Finals group stage in September. In Rotterdam, Wawrinka defeated Bublik and Richard Gasquet for his first tour-level quarterfinal of the year. He lost his match to eventual finalist Jannik Sinner in straight sets but improved his ranking to world No. 105. At his next tournament in Marseille, he followed up with a quarterfinal appearance following three-set wins against Zizou Bergs and Richard Gasquet, before losing in straight sets to Arthur Fils. With his run, he returned to the top 100.

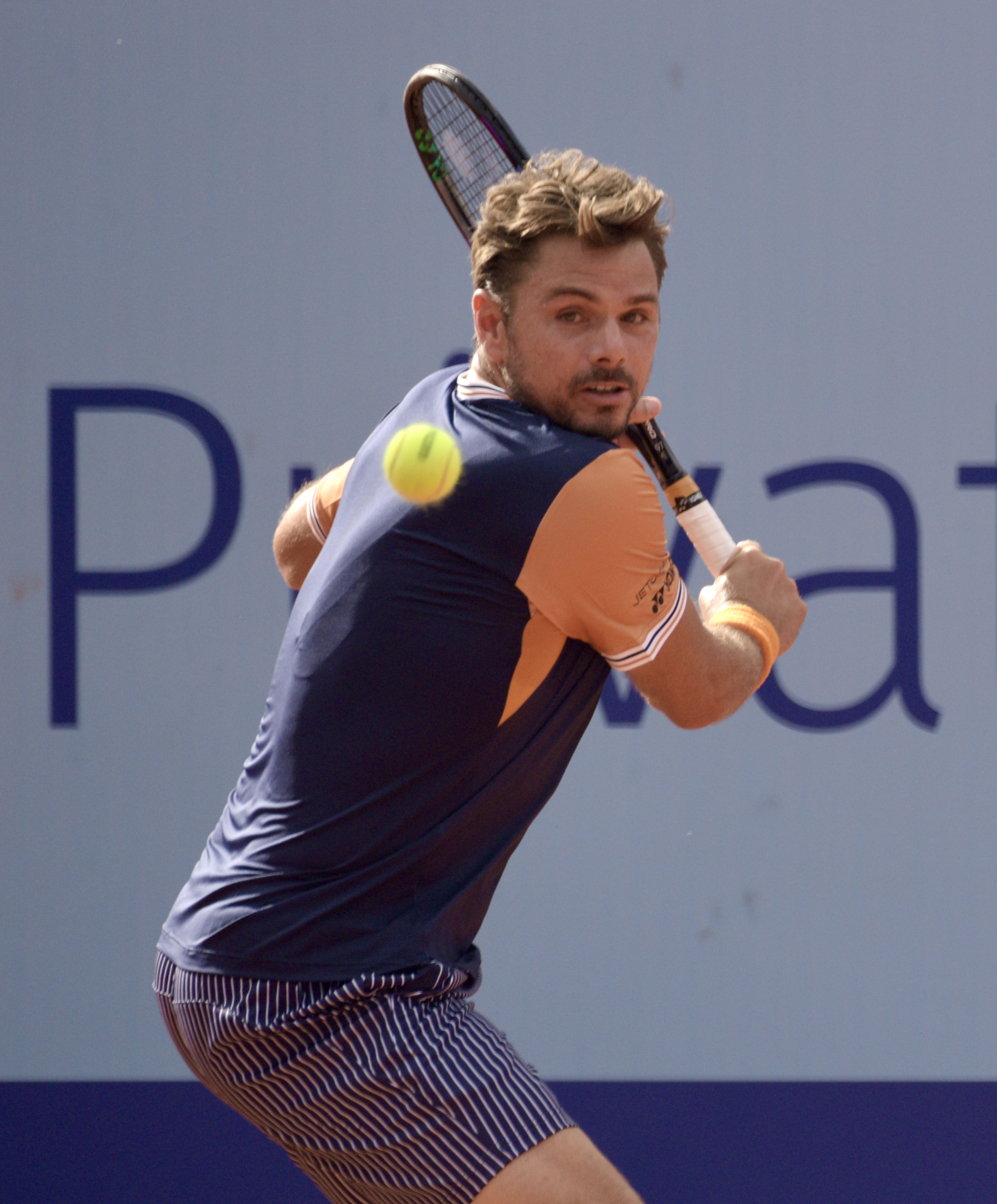
Stan Wawrinka at the 2023 Swiss Open Gstaad

With his win over Holger Rune in Indian Wells, he reached the fourth round of a Masters-level tournament for the first time since 2020 and at Indian Wells since 2017. He lost to eventual semifinalist Jannik Sinner. During the European Spring clay season, he reached the second round of all Masters tournaments at Monte-Carlo, Madrid, and Rome, losing to Taylor Fritz, Andrey Rublev, and Grigor Dimitrov, respectively. He also entered into the ATP 250 tournament in Banja Luka, losing in the first round to Luca Van Assche, and the Bordeaux Challenger where he reached the quarterfinals following a win over Andy Murray. In Paris, he matched his previous year's result at the second round, before losing to Thanasi Kokkinakis in five sets.

Following Paris and Wimbledon, he returned to the Swiss clay in Gstaad, losing to Jaume Munar in straight sets. In doubles, Wawrinka teamed up with compatriot Dominic Stricker and the pair went on to lift the trophy on home soil. His run in Umag included his first ATP final since 2019, defeating Filip Misolic, Federico Coria, Roberto Carballes Baena, and Lorenzo Sonego. After winning the first set in a tiebreak, he was defeated by Alexei Popyrin in three sets. By reaching the final, he ascended to World No. 49.

At the 2024 Australian Open he lost to Adrian Mannarino. Next he played in Indian Wells also losing to Tomáš Macháč in three close sets. At the 2024 French Open, he recorded his 70th Grand Slam participation, tied for fifth place with Fabrice Santoro, with a win over Andy Murray in straight sets.

Ranked outside the top 150, Wawrinka received a main draw wildcard for the 2024 US Open, the 2024 China Open, and finally at the 2024 Rolex Shanghai Masters where he lost to Flavio Cobolli in a second round match with an umpire scoring error.

At 39 years old, as the oldest tournament quarterfinalist ever at the 2024 Stockholm Open, Wawrinka reached the semifinals defeating top seed Andrey Rublev to get his first top 10 win since August 2023. He became the third-oldest semifinalist in the ATP history (since 1990), behind Jimmy Connors and Ivo Karlovic.

At the 2024 Swiss Indoors Wawrinka became the oldest match winner in the tournament history, defeating Adrian Mannarino as a wildcard, for the first time, having lost to him three times previously.

=== 2025–2026: Retirement ===
Wawrinka was a wildcard entry to the main draw of the 2025 Australian Open, but lost in the first round to Lorenzo Sonego.

Aged 40 at the 2025 Țiriac Open where he received a wildcard, Wawrinka defeated Timofey Skatov to record his first win since October 2024, making him the third 40-year-old to win an ATP Tour or Grand Slam match on clay since 1980, joining Jimmy Connors and Ivo Karlovic.

Wawrinka was awarded a wildcard for the main draw at the 2025 French Open and the 2025 Wimbledon Championships.

On 19 December 2025, Wawrinka announced that 2026 would be his last season on the ATP Tour.

He received a wildcard for the main draw of the 2026 Australian Open, marking the final appearance of the former champion. He lost in the third round to ninth seed Taylor Fritz. Wawrinka also received a wildcard for his final appearance at the French Open, although he eventually became part of the main draw entry list after the withdrawal of Lorenzo Musetti. He lost in the first round to lucky loser Jesper de Jong in four sets. Also as a wildcard at the Wimbledon he lost in the first round to Matteo Berrettini 6–7(7), 7–6(16), 7–6(7), 7–6(5). He would then receive a last minute unexpected wildcard into the US Open after the withdrawal of Patrick Kypson due to an injury. This gave the former US Open champion a chance to play the tournament in his final season. He would go on to lose again to Matteo Berrettini in the first round.

== Playing style and reputation ==
Possessing one of the strongest one-handed backhands on tour, Wawrinka is characterized as a powerful offensive baseliner capable of playing well on most surfaces, especially on clay and hard courts. He is known for his fast serve which has reached as high as 232 kilometres per hour (144 mph). His forehand, considered a weakness early in his career, has improved significantly and is now a big weapon in his game. Wawrinka is known by the nicknames "Stanimal" and "Stan the Man" for both his play style and ability to win in big matches, particularly between the 2014 Australian Open and the 2016 US Open.

As analyzed in a New York Times Magazine article (22 August 2014), Wawrinka's backhand drive motion is unique in several areas:

1. Upon releasing the racquet to make contact with the ball, hip and body turn continues to open up the chest to face the opponent
  (unlike most conventional 1HBH players that stop with the hitting shoulder facing the opponent)
2. Racquet face remain closed throughout the follow-through
  (unlike most conventional 1HBH players that open up the racquet face during the follow-though for a lifting action)
3. The racquet continues the swing path to reach behind the body
  (unlike most conventional 1HBH players that let the lifting action to bring the racquet above the head)
Wawrinka's backhand drive motion

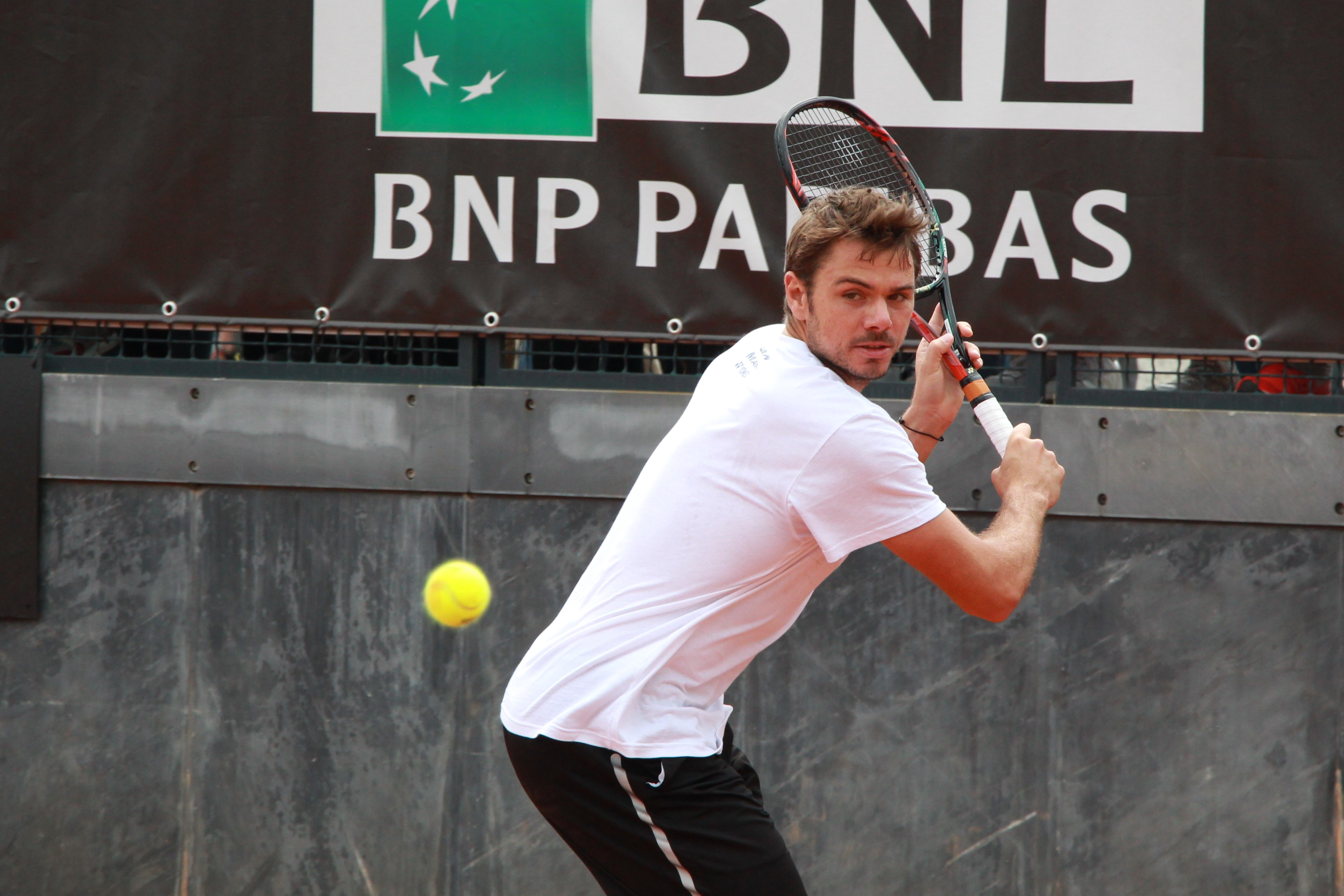

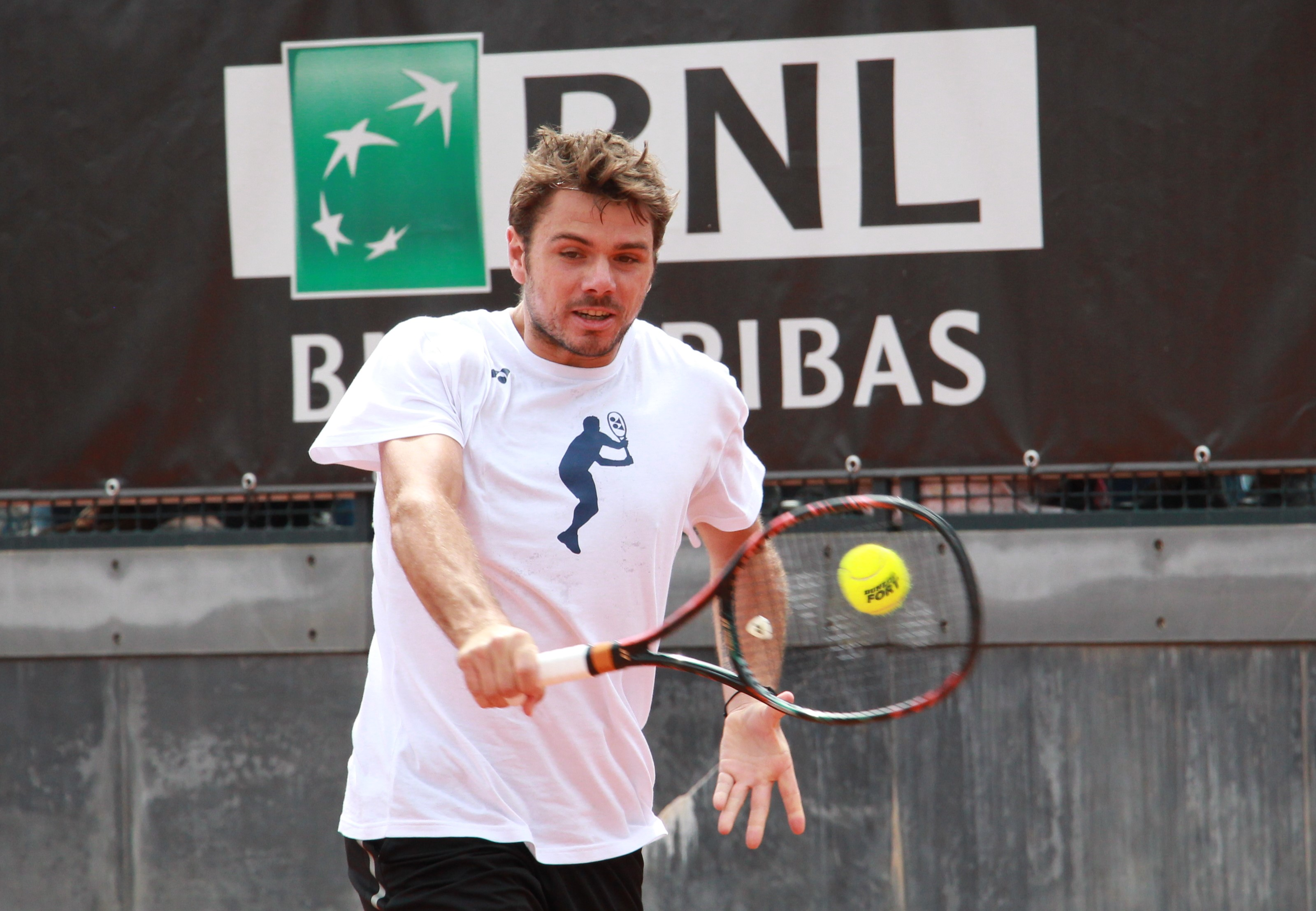

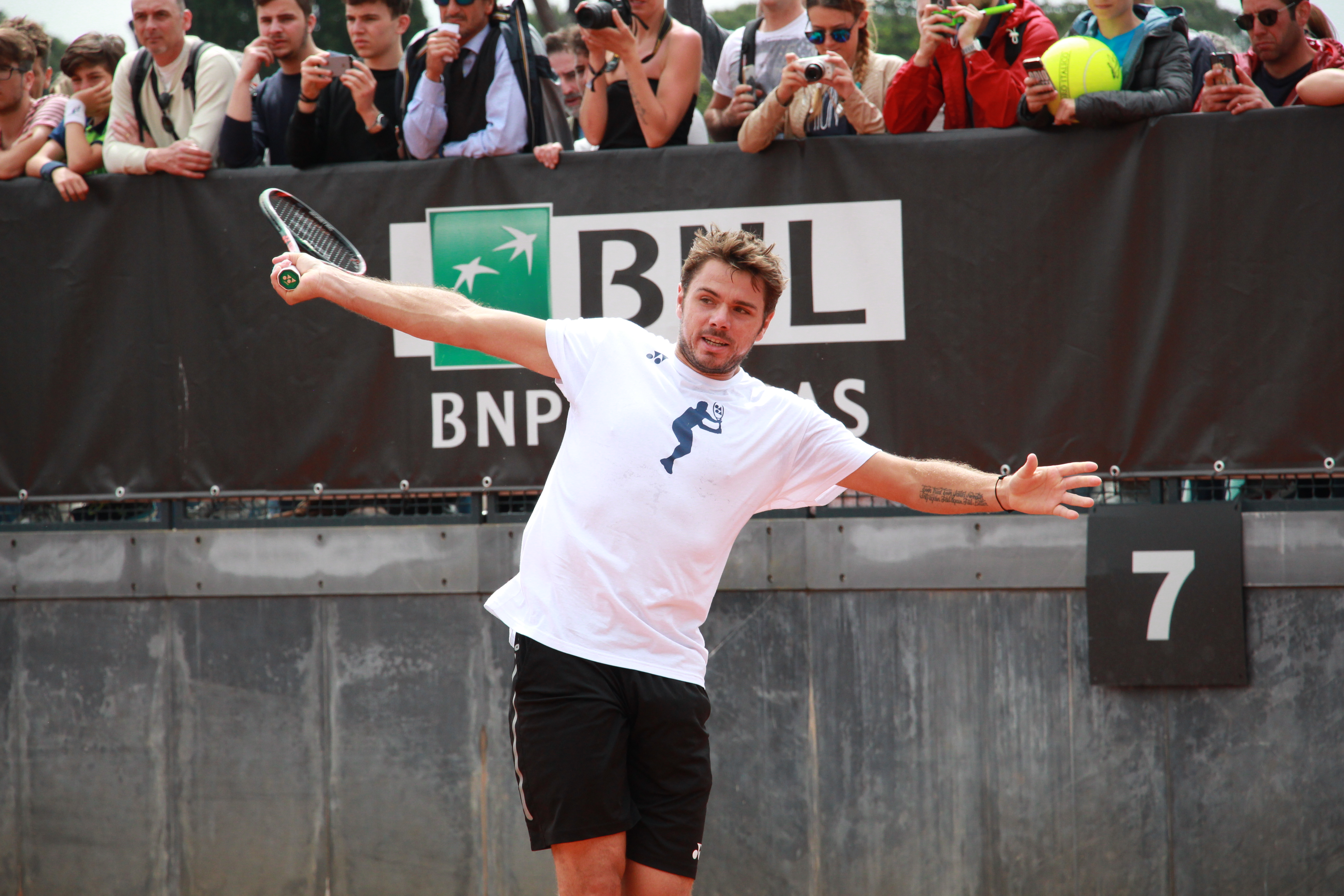

In 2013, he began working with new coach Magnus Norman, who was a former world No. 2 and coached Robin Söderling to two consecutive French Open finals and a Masters title. This partnership has been credited with improvement in Wawrinka's overall game, who qualified for the ATP World Tour Finals for the first time the same year and ended the year in Top 10 for the first time. The following 3 years Wawrinka won 1 Grand Slam each year, qualified for Tour Finals, and also year-end World #4 in those seasons.

Norman is also credited with improvement in Wawrinka's mental toughness, as seen in his performance in important matches and was evident in his victories over Andy Murray at the 2013 US Open, and Novak Djokovic at the 2014 Australian Open (both were defending champions), as well as his improved consistency, culminating in his win over No. 1 Rafael Nadal at the 2014 Australian Open in which Wawrinka survived a fightback from Nadal to clinch the title. He also survived a fightback from No. 1 Novak Djokovic at the 2015 French Open final, being down one break of serve in the fourth set, before breaking Djokovic's service twice to clinch the title.

Despite his late-career successes, Wawrinka has been mired with inconsistency throughout his career. Illustrative of this is his record against players ranked No. 1 in the world. In Grand Slam finals, he holds a 3–0 record against No. 1 players but is 2–20 in all other matches against No. 1s, with those victories coming in the semifinals of the 2017 French Open against Andy Murray and the fourth round of the 2019 US Open against Novak Djokovic. This, combined with the 11 consecutive finals won, has given Wawrinka the reputation of being a "big-match player". Furthermore, Wawrinka is one of only two players in the Open Era to have won three Grand Slam singles titles, but never been ranked higher than No. 3, the other being Jan Kodeš.

== Rivalries ==
=== Djokovic vs. Wawrinka ===
Wawrinka and Novak Djokovic played each other 27 times with Wawrinka trailing 6–21. Wawrinka defeated Djokovic at three Grand Slam tournaments which he won, including two finals. Wawrinka and Djokovic played in three consecutive Australian Opens (2013–2015), with each match going to five sets, a five-set match at the 2013 US Open, and a five set match at the 2006 Davis Cup. At the 2013 Australian Open, the two played each other in the fourth round with Djokovic winning 12–10 in the fifth set, with the match being considered one of the best ever played. Later that year at the US Open in what was Wawrinka's first career Grand Slam semifinal appearance, Djokovic won 6–4 in the fifth set. At the 2014 Australian Open quarterfinals, Wawrinka won 9–7 in the fifth set, breaking Djokovic's run of 14 consecutive semifinals in Grand Slam tournaments and ending Djokovic's 25-match winning streak at the Australian Open. Djokovic got revenge at the 2015 Australian Open, winning 6–0 in the fifth set. In the 2015 French Open final, Wawrinka defeated Djokovic in four sets to claim his second Grand Slam title and thereby become the only player apart from Roger Federer to defeat Djokovic in the Australian Open and the French Open. Wawrinka defeated Djokovic in four sets to win the 2016 US Open singles title. At the 2019 US Open, Wawrinka once again defeated Djokovic (who at the time had won 36 of his last 37 Grand Slam matches) after Djokovic retired injured trailing two sets to love. At the 2023 Wimbledon Championships, Djokovic defeated Wawrinka in three sets. Contrary to most high-profile rivalries, they have played doubles together and maintain a close friendship. Despite Djokovic's 21–6 overall record against Wawrinka, Wawrinka leads Djokovic 2–0 in Grand Slam finals and 3–2 in all ATP finals. Their overall head-to-head in Grand Slam matches is in Djokovic's favor, with him leading 5–4. In Djokovic's thirteen Grand Slam finals dating from 2014 Wimbledon through the 2020 Australian Open, his only two losses came at the hands of Wawrinka. Moreover, in Djokovic's 38 Grand Slam championship matches, Wawrinka is one of only two opponents (alongside Carlos Alcaraz) he has not defeated and Wawrinka is one of only three opponents outside the Big Four (the others being Alcaraz and Daniil Medvedev) who have defeated him.

=== Federer vs. Wawrinka ===
Wawrinka and his compatriot Roger Federer played each other 26 times with Wawrinka trailing 3–23. Federer leads 7–1 in Grand Slam tournaments, 17–0 on hard courts, 1–0 on grass courts and 4–3 on clay courts. While the rivalry is one-sided in Federer's favour, the two of them have contested some close matches such as the 2014 Monte Carlo Rolex Masters final in which Wawrinka came from behind a set to defeat Federer in three sets to win his first Masters 1000 title. Wawrinka also defeated Federer in straight sets during the 2015 French Open quarterfinals en route to winning his first ever French Open title although Federer then reversed it with a straight sets victory in the 2015 US Open semifinals. Federer defeated Wawrinka in five sets in the 2017 Australian Open semifinals en route to his 18th major title. Other close matches include the 2012 Shanghai Masters and the 2013 Indian Wells Masters, both of which Federer won in three sets, the 2014 Wimbledon quarterfinal which Federer won in four sets and the 2014 ATP World Tour Finals in which Federer won in three sets after saving four match points. The duo's most recent encounter took place at 2019 French Open with Federer prevailing in four sets. Despite their on-court rivalry, they are close friends off court and they have played doubles together on numerous occasions, most notably when they won the doubles Olympic Gold at the 2008 Beijing Olympics and when winning the 2014 Davis Cup.

=== Murray vs. Wawrinka ===
Wawrinka and Andy Murray played each other 23 times with Wawrinka trailing 10–13. Murray leads 9–4 on hard courts and 3–0 on grass courts while Wawrinka leads 6–1 on clay courts. They have also met 8 times in Grand Slam tournaments and result is Stan leading 5–3. They have contested some close matches and two of their most notable matches were in the 2009 Wimbledon fourth round which Murray won in five sets and was the first men's match to be played under the Wimbledon roof, having the latest finish for a Wimbledon match at the time, and the 2017 French Open semi-final, where Wawrinka prevailed in a five-set thriller that lasted over four hours. Wawrinka also ended Murray's title defence at the 2013 US Open quarterfinals with a comfortable straight sets victory. Other close matches the two have contested include the 2010 US Open which Wawrinka won in four sets and was Murray's last defeat before a Grand Slam quarterfinal until the 2015 US Open, the 2008 Canada Open and 2011 Shanghai Masters, both of which Murray won in three sets.

While Murray has led the majority of the rivalry, Wawrinka won their first two matches and beat Murray three consecutive times between 2013 and 2015, winning all of them in straight sets, until Murray ended the winning streak at the 2016 French Open, beating the defending champion Wawrinka in four sets. In the 2018 Eastbourne International, Murray won in straight sets. Around this time Wawrinka was identified by some, including Djokovic, as a potential contender to turn the Big Four tennis quartet into a "Big Five", although Wawrinka himself downplayed those suggestions, stating that he was still far behind the others. Their most recent encounter before the 2020 French Open was in the final of the European open 2019 in which Murray prevailed coming back from a set and a break down to win his first title since 2017 and his hip surgery. They met in the 2020 French Open first round with Wawrinka winning in straight sets. However, in the first round of the 2022 Cincinnati Masters, Murray won in three tight sets.

=== Nadal vs. Wawrinka ===
Wawrinka and Rafael Nadal played each other 20 times with Wawrinka trailing 3–17 against Nadal. Although this rivalry has less significance than rivalries with the other members of the Big Four, the pair have met in several prestigious tournaments. The rivalry saw Nadal winning the first 12 encounters, all in straight sets, including 2 finals, one of which was a Masters 1000 final at Madrid in 2013. However, since Wawrinka's breakthrough season in 2013 the head-to-head has been slightly more even (3–6) from 2014 onward. Wawrinka scored his first win against Nadal in their first Grand Slam final, the 2014 Australian Open final in 4 sets, denying Nadal's double career slam. It was also the only match between the pair not resulting in a straight set win for either player. Nadal won their second Grand Slam final, at the 2017 French Open.

== Personal life ==
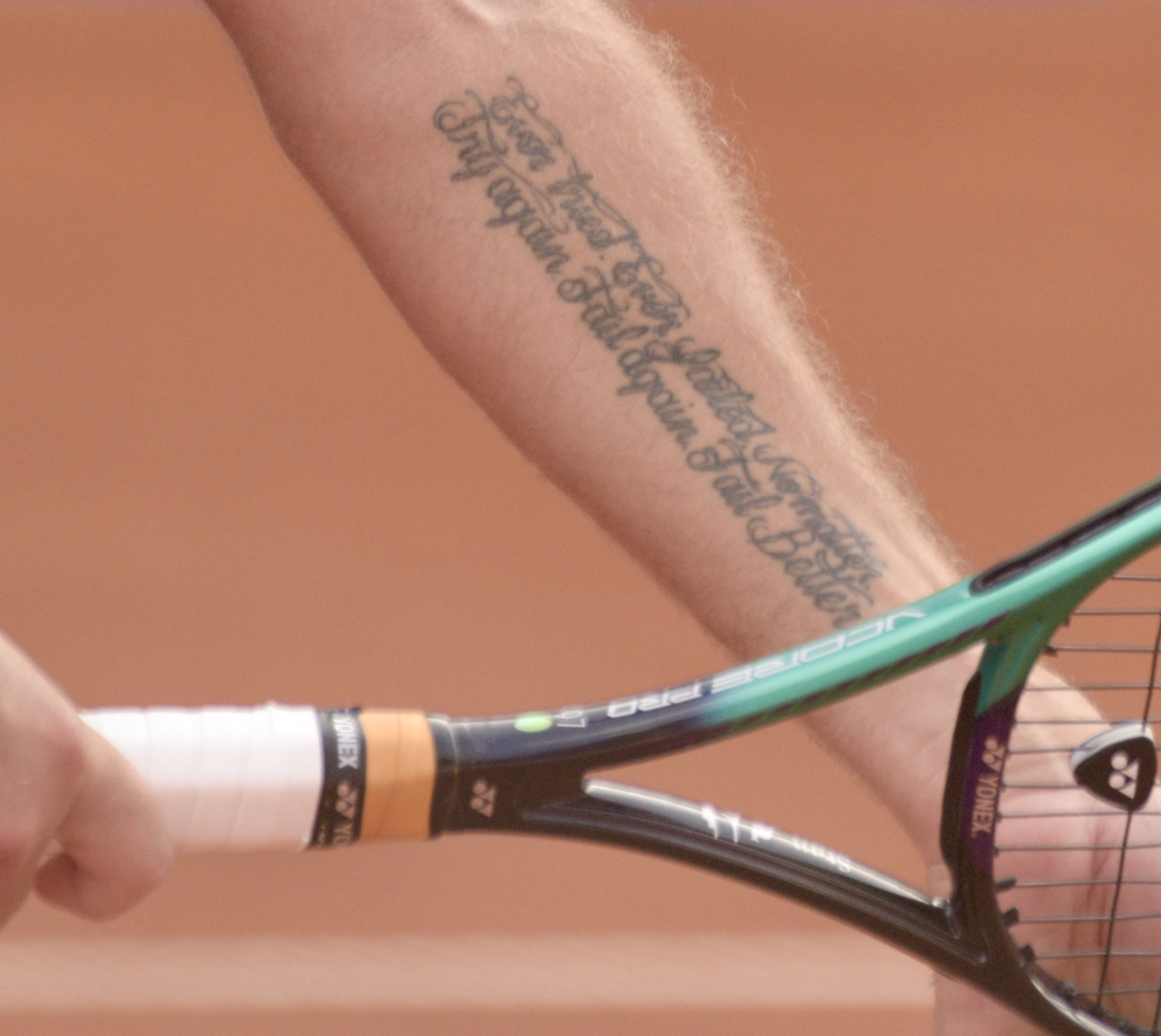
Wawrinka's forearm tattoo

In 2009, Wawrinka was living in Saint-Barthélemy, about 20 km (12 mi) north of Lausanne, with his wife Ilham Vuilloud, a Swiss television presenter and former fashion model. They got married on 15 December 2009. Vuilloud gave birth to the couple's child, a girl named Alexia, on 12 February 2010. On 4 January 2011, Swiss media reported that Wawrinka separated from the family, less than one year after his daughter's birth. The couple later reconciled, but on 19 April 2015 Wawrinka posted a statement on his Facebook page announcing their divorce. The following day, Vuilloud strongly disputed Wawrinka's version of events.

Wawrinka began dating Croatian WTA player Donna Vekić in 2015, their relationship becoming public knowledge after Nick Kyrgios taunted Wawrinka over it during a match at Montreal. Kyrgios was subsequently fined and given a suspended ban for his comments. Wawrinka and Vekić were reported to have split in May 2019.

Wawrinka appeared in the 2015 ESPN body issue, posing nude in athletic poses.

Wawrinka has a tattoo on his left forearm in italic script that quotes the Irish writer Samuel Beckett in English: "Ever tried. Ever failed. No matter. Try Again. Fail again. Fail better." On his right rib, he has his daughter's name.

Wawrinka is a self-proclaimed "big fan" of the Lausanne HC, his hometown ice hockey team.

== Commercial endorsements ==
As of June 2016, Wawrinka wears Yonex clothing and shoes and uses the Yonex VCORE 95D racquet with the Yonex Vcore Duel G paint job, formerly playing with a Yonex VCORE Tour 97 paint job. Wawrinka has been known to use Babolat's RPM Blast as his string of choice, opting to string his rackets at 27 kilograms in the main strings and 25 kilograms in the cross strings. Previously, he used Head tennis racquets, first the Flexpoint Prestige MidPlus and Microgel Prestige Pro, and then the YouTek Prestige Pro MidPlus. Wawrinka is also an ambassador for the TGV Lyria train service between France and Switzerland, with his photo appearing on the exterior of the high-speed trains.

== Career statistics ==
=== Grand Slam performance timeline ===
Key
W	F	SF	QF	#R	RR	Q#	DNQ	A	NH

(W) winner; (F) finalist; (SF) semifinalist; (QF) quarterfinalist; (#R) rounds 4, 3, 2, 1; (RR) round-robin stage; (Q#) qualification round; (DNQ) did not qualify; (A) absent; (NH) not held; (SR) strike rate (events won / competed); (W–L) win–loss record.
To avoid confusion and double counting, these charts are updated at the conclusion of a tournament or when the player's participation has ended.

Tournament	2004	2005	2006	2007	2008	2009	2010	2011	2012	2013	2014	2015	2016	2017	2018	2019	2020	2021	2022	2023	2024	2025	2026	SR	W–L	Win%
Australian Open	Q1	Q2	2R	3R	2R	3R	3R	QF	3R	4R	W	SF	4R	SF	2R	2R	QF	2R	A	1R	1R	1R	3R	1 / 20	45–19	70%
French Open	Q1	3R	1R	2R	3R	3R	4R	4R	4R	QF	1R	W	SF	F	1R	QF	3R	A	1R	2R	2R	1R	1R	1 / 21	46–20	70%
Wimbledon	A	1R	3R	1R	4R	4R	1R	2R	1R	1R	QF	QF	2R	1R	2R	2R	NH	A	1R	3R	2R	A	1R	0 / 19	23–19	55%
US Open	Q2	3R	3R	4R	4R	1R	QF	2R	4R	SF	QF	SF	W	A	3R	QF	A	A	1R	3R	1R	A	1R	1 / 18	46–17	73%
Win–loss	0–0	4–3	5–4	6–4	9–4	7–4	9–4	9–4	8–4	12–4	13–3	21–3	16–3	11–3	4–4	10–4	6–2	1–1	0–3	5–4	2–4	0–2	2–4	3 / 78	160–75	68%

Finals: 4 (3 titles, 1 runner-up)

Result	Year	Championship	Surface	Opponent	Score
Win	2014	Australian Open	Hard	(Spain) Rafael Nadal	6–3, 6–2, 3–6, 6–3
Win	2015	French Open	Clay	(Serbia) Novak Djokovic	4–6, 6–4, 6–3, 6–4
Win	2016	US Open	Hard	(Serbia) Novak Djokovic	6–7^{(1–7)}, 6–4, 7–5, 6–3
Loss	2017	French Open	Clay	(Spain) Rafael Nadal	2–6, 3–6, 1–6

== Explanatory notes ==
Awards and achievements
Preceded by Roger Federer	Swiss Sportsman of the Year; 2015	Succeeded by Fabian Cancellara
Olympic Games
Preceded by Roger Federer	Flagbearer for Switzerland; London 2012	Succeeded by Giulia Steingruber
