= 2024 Țiriac Open – Doubles =

Doubles
- 2024 Țiriac Open

Final
- Champions: (France) Sadio Doumbia (France) Fabien Reboul
- Runners-up: (Finland) Harri Heliövaara (United Kingdom) Henry Patten
- Score: 6–3, 7–5

Details
- Draw: 16 (2 WC)
- Seeds: 4

Events
Singles	Doubles
← 2016 ·	Romanian Open	· 2025 →

Sadio Doumbia and Fabien Reboul defeated Harri Heliövaara and Henry Patten in the final, 6–3, 7–5 to win the doubles tennis title at the 2024 Țiriac Open.

Florin Mergea and Horia Tecău were the reigning champions from when the tournament was last held in 2016, but both players have since retired from professional tennis.

== Seeds ==
1. (United Kingdom) Lloyd Glasspool / (Netherlands) Jean-Julien Rojer (quarterfinals)
2. (France) Sadio Doumbia / (France) Fabien Reboul (champions)
3. (Finland) Harri Heliövaara / (United Kingdom) Henry Patten (final)
4. (Colombia) Nicolás Barrientos / (Brazil) Rafael Matos (semifinals)

== Draw ==
Key

- Q = Qualifier
- WC = Wild card
- LL = Lucky loser
- Alt = Alternate
- ITF = ITF entry
- PR = Protected ranking
- SR = Special ranking
- SE = Special exempt
- JE = Junior exempt
- JR = Junior Accelerator Programme entrant
- CO = College Accelerator Programme entrant
- NG = Next Gen Accelerator Program entrant
- w/o = Walkover
- r = Retired
- d = Defaulted

=== Draw ===
First round
1	(United Kingdom) L Glasspool (Netherlands) J-J Rojer	7^{7}	6
(France) F Martin (Ukraine) D Molchanov	6^{2}	2
(Netherlands) S Arends (Netherlands) M Middelkoop	6	7^{8}
(France) N Mahut (France) A Rinderknech	3	6^{6}
3	(Finland) H Heliövaara (United Kingdom) H Patten	6	6
WC	(Romania) C Crețu (Romania) FC Jianu	1	3
(Serbia) N Ćaćić (Serbia) M Kecmanović	3	3
(Portugal) F Cabral (Kazakhstan) A Nedovyesov	6	6
(Monaco) R Arneodo (Austria) S Weissborn	3	6^{4}
(Spain) P Martínez (Chile) A Tabilo	6	7^{7}
Alt	(Argentina) F Coria (Argentina) M Navone	2	3
4	(Colombia) N Barrientos (Brazil) R Matos	6	6
(Portugal) N Borges (United States) R Stalder	6	7
WC	(Romania) M Copil (Romania) B Pavel	3	5
(Netherlands) T Griekspoor (Netherlands) B Stevens	6^{9}	4
2	(France) S Doumbia (France) F Reboul	7^{11}	6

Quarterfinals
1	(United Kingdom) L Glasspool (Netherlands) J-J Rojer	6	3	[6]
(Netherlands) S Arends (Netherlands) M Middelkoop	3	6	[10]
3	(Finland) H Heliövaara (United Kingdom) H Patten	7^{8}	6
(Portugal) F Cabral (Kazakhstan) A Nedovyesov	6^{6}	4
(Spain) P Martínez (Chile) A Tabilo
4	(Colombia) N Barrientos (Brazil) R Matos	w/o
(Portugal) N Borges (United States) R Stalder	6	3	[7]
2	(France) S Doumbia (France) F Reboul	4	6	[10]

Semifinals
(Netherlands) S Arends (Netherlands) M Middelkoop	6	6^{4}	[8]
3	(Finland) H Heliövaara (United Kingdom) H Patten	4	7^{7}	[10]
4	(Colombia) N Barrientos (Brazil) R Matos	3	2
2	(France) S Doumbia (France) F Reboul	6	6

Final
3	(Finland) H Heliövaara (United Kingdom) H Patten	3	5
2	(France) S Doumbia (France) F Reboul	6	7
