= 2026 Țiriac Open =

- Date: 30 March – 5 April
- Edition: 24th
- Category: ATP 250 tournaments
- Draw: 28S / 16D
- Surface: Clay / outdoor
- Location: Bucharest, Romania
- Venue: Centrul Național de Tenis

Champions

Singles
- (Argentina) Mariano Navone

Doubles
- (France) Sadio Doumbia / (France) Fabien Reboul
- Romanian Open

The 2026 Țiriac Open presented by UniCredit Bank was a tennis tournament played on outdoor clay courts in Bucharest, Romania, from 30 March to 5 April 2026. It was the 24th edition of the Romanian Open tournament, and part of the ATP 250 tournaments of the 2026 ATP Tour.

== Champions ==
=== Singles ===
- (Argentina) Mariano Navone def. (Spain) Daniel Mérida, 6–2, 4–6, 7–5

=== Doubles ===
- (France) Sadio Doumbia / (France) Fabien Reboul def. (Czech Republic) Adam Pavlásek / (Czech Republic) Patrik Rikl, 6–1, 6–4

== Singles main draw entrants ==
=== Seeds ===
Country	Player	Rank^{1}	Seed
CAN	Gabriel Diallo	37	1
FRA	Adrian Mannarino	43	2
HUN	Fábián Marozsán	46	3
POR	Nuno Borges	51	4
ARG	Sebastián Báez	52	5
GER	Daniel Altmaier	55	6
ARG	Mariano Navone	61	7
NED	Botic van de Zandschulp	65	8

- ^{1} Rankings are as of 16 March 2025.

=== Other entrants ===
The following players received wildcards into the singles main draw:

- (Romania) Adrian Boitan
- (Romania) Filip Cristian Jianu
- (Romania) Radu David Țurcanu

The following players received entry as alternates:

- (Australia) Christopher O'Connell
- (Finland) Otto Virtanen

The following players received entry from the qualifying draw:

- (Georgia (country)) Nikoloz Basilashvili
- (Spain) Daniel Mérida
- (Slovakia) Alex Molčan
- (Greece) Stefanos Sakellaridis

=== Withdrawals ===
- (Italy) Flavio Cobolli → replaced by (Spain) Pedro Martínez
- (Belgium) Raphaël Collignon → replaced by (Lithuania) Vilius Gaubas
- (Argentina) Francisco Comesaña → replaced by (Denmark) Elmer Møller
- (Hungary) Márton Fucsovics → replaced by (Italy) Francesco Maestrelli
- (Serbia) Miomir Kecmanović → replaced by (Croatia) Dino Prižmić
- (United States) Emilio Nava → replaced by (Australia) Christopher O'Connell (Alt)
- (France) Arthur Rinderknech → replaced by (Finland) Otto Virtanen (Alt)

== Doubles main draw entrants ==
=== Seeds ===
Country	Player	Country	Player	Rank^{1}	Seed
FRA	Sadio Doumbia	FRA	Fabien Reboul	51	1
AUT	Alexander Erler	AUT	Lucas Miedler	52	2
IND	Yuki Bhambri	NZL	Michael Venus	62	3
GER	Constantin Frantzen	NED	Robin Haase	87	4

- Rankings are as of 16 March 2026.

=== Other entrants ===
The following pairs received wildcards into the doubles main draw:

- (Romania) Ștefan Horia Haita / (Romania) Rareș Teodor Pieleanu
- (Romania) Alexandru Jecan / (Romania) Bogdan Pavel
