= 2018 Shanghai Challenger – Doubles =

Doubles
- 2018 Shanghai Challenger

Final
- Champions: (China) Gong Maoxin (China) Zhang Ze
- Runners-up: (China) Hua Runhao (China) Zhang Zhizhen
- Score: 6–4, 3–6, [10–4]

Events
Singles	Doubles
← 2017 ·	Shanghai Challenger	· 2019 →

Toshihide Matsui and Yi Chu-huan were the defending champions but only Yi chose to defend his title, partnering Peng Hsien-yin. Yi lost in the first round to Gong Maoxin and Zhang Ze.

Gong and Zhang Ze went on to win the title after defeating Hua Runhao and Zhang Zhizhen 6–4, 3–6, [10–4] in the final.

== Seeds ==
1. (Chinese Taipei) Hsieh Cheng-peng / (Indonesia) Christopher Rungkat (semifinals)
2. (China) Gong Maoxin / (China) Zhang Ze (champions)
3. (Chinese Taipei) Chen Ti / (Australia) Max Purcell (first round)
4. (India) Vijay Sundar Prashanth / (India) Vishnu Vardhan (semifinals)

== Draw ==
=== Key ===
- Q = Qualifier
- WC = Wild card
- LL = Lucky loser
- Alt = Alternate
- SE = Special exempt
- PR = Protected ranking
- ITF = ITF entry
- JE = Junior exempt
- w/o = Walkover
- r = Retired
- d = Defaulted
- SR = Special ranking

First round
1	(Chinese Taipei) C-p Hsieh (Indonesia) C Rungkat	6	6
WC	(China) Y He (China) Zeng Shi Hong	2	1
(China) F Sun (China) D Wu	6	6
(Kazakhstan) A Bublik (Serbia) M Kecmanović	2	4
3	(Chinese Taipei) T Chen (Australia) M Purcell	4	2
WC	(China) R Hua (China) Zh Zhang	6	6
WC	(China) X Gao (China) R Te	6^{5}	4
Alt	(Italy) A Bega (France) T Lamasine	7^{7}	6
(Italy) F Gaio (Spain) E López Pérez
(Canada) F Peliwo (Canada) B Schnur	w/o
(Australia) B Mousley (Australia) A Santillan	4	6^{2}
4	(India) VS Prashanth (India) V Vardhan	6	7^{7}
(United States) A Lawson (China) Z Li	4	6	[10]
(Japan) H Moriya (Russia) R Safiullin	6	0	[8]
(Chinese Taipei) H-y Peng (Chinese Taipei) C-h Yi	4	6^{8}
2	(China) M Gong (China) Ze Zhang	6	7^{10}

Quarterfinals
1	(Chinese Taipei) C-p Hsieh (Indonesia) C Rungkat	6	5	[10]
(China) F Sun (China) D Wu	4	7	[1]
WC	(China) R Hua (China) Zh Zhang	6	6
Alt	(Italy) A Bega (France) T Lamasine	4	4
(Canada) F Peliwo (Canada) B Schnur	3	4
4	(India) VS Prashanth (India) V Vardhan	6	6
(United States) A Lawson (China) Z Li	4	7^{7}	[4]
2	(China) M Gong (China) Ze Zhang	6	6^{2}	[10]

Semifinals
1	(Chinese Taipei) C-p Hsieh (Indonesia) C Rungkat	6^{7}	4
WC	(China) R Hua (China) Zh Zhang	7^{9}	6
4	(India) VS Prashanth (India) V Vardhan	2	6^{4}
2	(China) M Gong (China) Ze Zhang	6	7^{7}

Final
WC	(China) R Hua (China) Zh Zhang	4	6	[4]
2	(China) M Gong (China) Ze Zhang	6	3	[10]
