= 2018 Shanghai Challenger – Singles =

Singles
- 2018 Shanghai Challenger

Final
- Champion: (Slovenia) Blaž Kavčič
- Runner-up: (Japan) Hiroki Moriya
- Score: 6–1, 7–6^{(7–1)}

Events
Singles	Doubles
- Shanghai Challenger

Wu Yibing was the defending champion but lost in the second round to Li Zhe.

Blaž Kavčič won the title after defeating Hiroki Moriya 6–1, 7–6^{(7–1)} in the final.

== Seeds ==
1. (Chinese Taipei) Jason Jung (second round)
2. (Spain) Enrique López Pérez (withdrew)
3. (Japan) Tatsuma Ito (first round, retired)
4. (China) Zhang Ze (first round)
5. (Japan) Go Soeda (first round)
6. (Canada) Filip Peliwo (first round)
7. (Serbia) Miomir Kecmanović (semifinals, retired)
8. (Japan) Hiroki Moriya (final)

== Draw ==
Key

- Q = Qualifier
- WC = Wild card
- LL = Lucky loser
- Alt = Alternate
- ITF = ITF entry
- PR = Protected ranking
- SR = Special ranking
- SE = Special exempt
- JE = Junior exempt
- JR = Junior Accelerator Programme entrant
- CO = College Accelerator Programme entrant
- NG = Next Gen Accelerator Program entrant
- w/o = Walkover
- r = Retired
- d = Defaulted

=== Finals ===
Semifinals
7	(Serbia) Miomir Kecmanović	6	6^{4}	0^{r}
(Slovenia) Blaž Kavčič	4	7^{7}	1
8	(Japan) Hiroki Moriya	6^{3}	7^{7}	7^{7}
(China) Li Zhe	7^{7}	6^{5}	6^{4}

Final
(Slovenia) Blaž Kavčič	6	7^{7}
8	(Japan) Hiroki Moriya	1	6^{1}

=== Top half ===
First round
1	(Chinese Taipei) J Jung	4	7	6
WC	(China) R Hua	6	5	3
Q	(China) Y Bai	6	2	3
(China) D Wu	2	6	6
(Russia) R Safiullin	7^{7}	6^{4}	3
Q	(France) T Lamasine	6^{3}	7^{7}	6
Q	(Australia) D Kelly	6	6^{8}	2
7	(Serbia) M Kecmanović	4	7^{10}	6
3	(Japan) T Ito	2	0^{r}
(South Korea) S-w Kwon	6	0
(Italy) A Bega	4	6	6
(Italy) F Gaio	6	4	3
(Austria) J Rodionov	6	5	7
(Canada) B Schnur	4	7	5
(Slovenia) B Kavčič	6	5	6
6	(Canada) F Peliwo	1	7	0

Second round
1	(Chinese Taipei) J Jung	3	0
(China) D Wu	6	6
Q	(France) T Lamasine	4	3
7	(Serbia) M Kecmanović	6	6
(South Korea) S-w Kwon	5	3
(Italy) A Bega	7	6
(Austria) J Rodionov	7^{7}	3	4
(Slovenia) B Kavčič	6^{4}	6	6

Quarterfinals
(China) D Wu	6	3	1
7	(Serbia) M Kecmanović	3	6	6
(Italy) A Bega	1	6	2
(Slovenia) B Kavčič	6	4	6

Semifinals
7	(Serbia) M Kecmanović	6	6^{4}	0^{r}
(Slovenia) B Kavčič	4	7^{7}	1

=== Bottom half ===
First round
8	(Japan) H Moriya	4	6	6
(Chinese Taipei) T-h Yang	6	3	2
(Australia) A Santillan	6^{6}	3
(Belarus) U Ignatik	7^{8}	6
(Australia) M Purcell	6	6
(Austria) M Neuchrist	4	4
(Kazakhstan) A Bublik	6	5	6
4	(China) Ze Zhang	3	7	4
5	(Japan) G Soeda	4	2
WC	(China) Y Wu	6	6
(China) Z Li	6	3	7
WC	(China) Zh Zhang	3	6	5
Q	(Bosnia and Herzegovina) A Šetkić	6	6
(South Korea) Y-s Chung	3	4
WC	(China) R Te	6	6
LL	(Norway) V Durasovic	3	3

Second round
8	(Japan) H Moriya	4	6	6
(Belarus) U Ignatik	6	3	1
(Australia) M Purcell	6^{5}	3
(Kazakhstan) A Bublik	7^{7}	6
WC	(China) Y Wu	6	0	3
(China) Z Li	3	6	6
Q	(Bosnia and Herzegovina) A Šetkić	6	7^{7}
WC	(China) R Te	3	6^{5}

Quarterfinals
8	(Japan) H Moriya	6	6
(Kazakhstan) A Bublik	4	4
(China) Z Li	6	6
Q	(Bosnia and Herzegovina) A Šetkić	4	0

Semifinals
8	(Japan) H Moriya	6^{3}	7^{7}	7^{7}
(China) Z Li	7^{7}	6^{5}	6^{4}
