= 2025 Shanghai Challenger – Singles =

Singles
- 2025 Shanghai Challenger

Final
- Champion: (Italy) Giulio Zeppieri
- Runner-up: (Japan) Yasutaka Uchiyama
- Score: 7–6^{(7–2)}, 7–5

Events
Singles	Doubles
← 2024 ·	Shanghai Challenger	· 2026 →

Sho Shimabukuro was the defending champion but lost in the first round to Petr Bar Biryukov.

Giulio Zeppieri won the title after defeating Yasutaka Uchiyama 7–6^{(7–2)}, 7–5 in the final.

== Seeds ==
1. (United Kingdom) Dan Evans (second round, retired)
2. (Japan) Yosuke Watanuki (first round)
3. (Japan) Yoshihito Nishioka (first round, retired)
4. (Australia) Bernard Tomic (semifinals)
5. (Australia) James McCabe (first round)
6. (Kazakhstan) Beibit Zhukayev (first round)
7. (Chinese Taipei) Hsu Yu-hsiou (semifinals)
8. (Japan) Sho Shimabukuro (first round)

== Draw ==
Key

- Q = Qualifier
- WC = Wild card
- LL = Lucky loser
- Alt = Alternate
- ITF = ITF entry
- PR = Protected ranking
- SR = Special ranking
- SE = Special exempt
- JE = Junior exempt
- JR = Junior Accelerator Programme entrant
- CO = College Accelerator Programme entrant
- NG = Next Gen Accelerator Program entrant
- w/o = Walkover
- r = Retired
- d = Defaulted

=== Finals ===
Semifinals
(Italy) Giulio Zeppieri	7^{7}	6
7	(Chinese Taipei) Hsu Yu-hsiou	6^{5}	3
4	(Australia) Bernard Tomic	3	6^{3}
(Japan) Yasutaka Uchiyama	6	7^{7}

Final
(Italy) Giulio Zeppieri	7^{7}	7
(Japan) Yasutaka Uchiyama	6^{2}	5

=== Top half ===
First round
1	(United Kingdom) D Evans	6	6
WC	(China) Xiao Linang	4	4
Q	(Poland) F Peliwo	6	0
(France) L Van Assche	4	0^{r}
(Italy) G Zeppieri	6	6
(Belgium) G Onclin	4	4
LL	P Bar Biryukov	6	6
8	(Japan) S Shimabukuro	4	4
3	(Japan) Y Nishioka	6	6^{5}	0^{r}
NG	(China) Y Zhou	2	7^{7}	2
Q	(Japan) K Isomura	0	2
Q	(Japan) Renta Tokuda	6	6
Q	(Thailand) K Samrej	0	7	7
(Chinese Taipei) T-l Wu	6	5	5
WC	(China) J Cui	2	1
7	(Chinese Taipei) Y-h Hsu	6	6

Second round
1	(United Kingdom) D Evans	4	6	2^{r}
Q	(Poland) F Peliwo	6	3	2
(Italy) G Zeppieri	6	6
LL	P Bar Biryukov	4	1
NG	(China) Y Zhou	6	6
Q	(Japan) R Tokuda	1	2
Q	(Thailand) K Samrej	5	4
7	(Chinese Taipei) Y-h Hsu	7	6

Quarterfinals
Q	(Poland) F Peliwo	1	3
(Italy) G Zeppieri	6	6
NG	(China) Y Zhou	6	1	6^{5}
7	(Chinese Taipei) Y-h Hsu	4	6	7^{7}

Semifinals
(Italy) G Zeppieri	7^{7}	6
7	(Chinese Taipei) Y-h Hsu	6^{5}	3

=== Bottom half ===
First round
5	(Australia) J McCabe	4	4
(China) F Sun	6	6
WC	(China) R Te	6	2	0^{r}
(Australia) O Jasika	4	6	2
(China) Y Bai	3	0
Q	(Chinese Taipei) T-h Huang	6	6
Q	(China) Zeng Yaojie	4	1
4	(Australia) B Tomic	6	6
6	(Kazakhstan) B Zhukayev	4	7^{9}	5
I Simakin	6	6^{7}	7
(Japan) Y Uchiyama	7	6
Alt	(France) A Géa	5	4
(United Kingdom) O Crawford	6	6
M Sharipov	3	2
(Japan) R Noguchi	6	7
2	(Japan) Y Watanuki	4	5

Second round
(China) F Sun	6	2	4
(Australia) O Jasika	2	6	6
Q	(Chinese Taipei) T-h Huang	3	1
4	(Australia) B Tomic	6	6
I Simakin	0	4
(Japan) Y Uchiyama	6	6
(United Kingdom) O Crawford	4	6	4
(Japan) R Noguchi	6	1	6

Quarterfinals
(Australia) O Jasika	4	6^{2}
4	(Australia) B Tomic	6	7^{7}
(Japan) Y Uchiyama	5	6	6
(Japan) R Noguchi	7	2	4

Semifinals
4	(Australia) B Tomic	3	6^{3}
(Japan) Y Uchiyama	6	7^{7}
