= 2025 Shanghai Challenger – Doubles =

Doubles
- 2025 Shanghai Challenger

Final
- Champions: (Thailand) Pruchya Isaro (India) Niki Kaliyanda Poonacha
- Runners-up: (Chinese Taipei) Jason Jung (United States) Reese Stalder
- Score: 6–4, 6–7^{(2–7)}, [10–8]

Events
| Singles | Doubles |
| ← 2024 · | Shanghai Challenger | · 2026 → |

Cristian Rodríguez and Matthew Romios were the defending champions but only Romios chose to defend his title, partnering Sun Fajing. They lost in the first round to Kaito Uesugi and Seita Watanabe.

Pruchya Isaro and Niki Kaliyanda Poonacha won the title after defeating Jason Jung and Reese Stalder 6–4, 6–7^{(2–7)}, [10–8] in the final.

== Seeds ==
1. (New Zealand) Finn Reynolds / (New Zealand) James Watt (quarterfinals)
2. (India) Siddhant Banthia / (India) Ramkumar Ramanathan (quarterfinals)
3. (Australia) Matthew Romios / (China) Sun Fajing (first round)
4. (Thailand) Pruchya Isaro / (India) Niki Kaliyanda Poonacha (champions)

== Draw ==
Key

- Q = Qualifier
- WC = Wild card
- LL = Lucky loser
- Alt = Alternate
- ITF = ITF entry
- PR = Protected ranking
- SR = Special ranking
- SE = Special exempt
- JE = Junior exempt
- JR = Junior Accelerator Programme entrant
- CO = College Accelerator Programme entrant
- NG = Next Gen Accelerator Program entrant
- w/o = Walkover
- r = Retired
- d = Defaulted

=== Draw ===
First round
1 | (New Zealand) F Reynolds (New Zealand) J Watt | 7^{8} | 4 | [10]
(Australia) J Charlton (United Kingdom) D Stevenson | 6^{6} | 6 | [7]
PR | (Chinese Taipei) J Jung (United States) R Stalder | 7^{7} | 6
WC | (China) Liu Hanyi (China) Zhang Linghao | 6^{5} | 2
3 | (Australia) MC Romios (China) F Sun | 3 | 3
(Japan) K Uesugi (Japan) S Watanabe | 6 | 6
(Australia) J McCabe (Australia) B Tomic | 2 | 2
(Japan) K Isomura (Japan) Y Shimizu | 6 | 6
(Chinese Taipei) Y-h Hsu (Chinese Taipei) T-h Huang | 7 | 5 | [4]
(Japan) Y Watanuki (Japan) T Yuzuki | 5 | 7 | [10]
P Bar Biryukov (Kazakhstan) B Zhukayev | 5 | 4
4 | (Thailand) P Isaro (India) N Kaliyanda Poonacha | 7 | 6
(Japan) M Imamura (Japan) Ryuki Matsuda | 1 | 3
WC | (China) J Cui (China) R Te | 6 | 6
(China) A Wang (China) Y Zhou | 5 | 6 | [10]
2 | (India) S Banthia (India) R Ramanathan | 7 | 2 | [12]

Quarterfinals
1 | (New Zealand) F Reynolds (New Zealand) J Watt | 1 | 3
PR | (Chinese Taipei) J Jung (United States) R Stalder | 6 | 6
(Japan) K Uesugi (Japan) S Watanabe | 3 | 6 | [10]
(Japan) K Isomura (Japan) Y Shimizu | 6 | 0 | [8]
(Japan) Y Watanuki (Japan) T Yuzuki | 4 | 6^{5}
4 | (Thailand) P Isaro (India) N Kaliyanda Poonacha | 6 | 7^{7}
WC | (China) J Cui (China) R Te | 7^{8} | 6
2 | (India) S Banthia (India) R Ramanathan | 6^{6} | 3

Semifinals
PR | (Chinese Taipei) J Jung (United States) R Stalder | 6 | 1 | [10]
(Japan) K Uesugi (Japan) S Watanabe | 3 | 6 | [2]
4 | (Thailand) P Isaro (India) N Kaliyanda Poonacha | 6 | 7^{7}
WC | (China) J Cui (China) R Te | 4 | 6^{5}

Final
PR | (Chinese Taipei) J Jung (United States) R Stalder | 4 | 7^{7} | [8]
4 | (Thailand) P Isaro (India) N Kaliyanda Poonacha | 6 | 6^{2} | [10]
