= 2016 Shanghai Challenger – Singles =

Singles
- 2016 Shanghai Challenger

Final
- Champion: (Switzerland) Henri Laaksonen
- Runner-up: (Chinese Taipei) Jason Jung
- Score: 6–3, 6–3

Events
Singles	Doubles
← 2015 ·	Shanghai Challenger	· 2017 →

Yuki Bhambri was the defending champion but chose not to defend his title.

Henri Laaksonen won the title after defeating Jason Jung 6–3, 6–3 in the final.

== Seeds ==
1. (Australia) Jordan Thompson (semifinals)
2. (Japan) Tatsuma Ito (first round)
3. (Japan) Go Soeda (quarterfinals)
4. (Switzerland) Henri Laaksonen (champion)
5. (Italy) Luca Vanni (first round)
6. (Chinese Taipei) Jason Jung (final)
7. (Russia) Alexander Kudryavtsev (second round)
8. (China) Zhang Ze (first round)

== Draw ==
=== Key ===
- Q = Qualifier
- WC = Wild card
- LL = Lucky loser
- Alt = Alternate
- SE = Special exempt
- PR = Protected ranking
- ITF = ITF entry
- JE = Junior exempt
- w/o = Walkover
- r = Retired
- d = Defaulted
- SR = Special ranking

=== Finals ===
Semifinals
1	(Australia) Jordan Thompson	4	4
6	(Chinese Taipei) Jason Jung	6	6
4	(Switzerland) Henri Laaksonen	6	7
Q	(Japan) Yasutaka Uchiyama	3	5

Final
6	(Chinese Taipei) Jason Jung	3	3
4	(Switzerland) Henri Laaksonen	6	6

=== Top half ===
First round
1	(Australia) J Thompson	6	6^{2}	7^{7}
(Chinese Taipei) T Chen	2	7^{7}	6^{4}
WC	(China) Zh Zhang	4	2
(Australia) M Matosevic	6	6
(Colombia) N Barrientos	1	3
(South Korea) S-w Kwon	6	6
Q	(Croatia) M Pecotić	6	3	7^{10}
8	(China) Ze Zhang	3	6	6^{8}
3	(Japan) G Soeda	3	6	6
(Australia) B Mott	6	1	4
(Japan) H Moriya	2	4
(Russia) A Karatsev	6	6
WC	(China) Z Qiu	0	2
(Japan) Yuya Kibi	6	6
(Ukraine) D Molchanov	2	3
6	(Chinese Taipei) J Jung	6	6

Second round
1	(Australia) J Thompson	6	7^{8}
(Australia) M Matosevic	3	6^{6}
(South Korea) S-w Kwon	7	6
Q	(Croatia) M Pecotić	5	4
3	(Japan) G Soeda	7	6
(Russia) A Karatsev	5	4
(Japan) Y Kibi	7^{7}	4	3
6	(Chinese Taipei) J Jung	6^{4}	6	6

Quarterfinals
1	(Australia) J Thompson	6	6
(South Korea) S-w Kwon	4	4
3	(Japan) G Soeda	2	5
6	(Chinese Taipei) J Jung	6	7

Semifinals
1	(Australia) J Thompson	4	4
6	(Chinese Taipei) J Jung	6	6

=== Bottom half ===
First round
5	(Italy) L Vanni	6	3	4
WC	(China) X Gao	4	6	6
WC	(China) F Sun	0	3
(United States) A Sarkissian	6	6
(China) Z Li	6	6
(China) D Wu	4	2
Q	(China) Xia Zihao	4	4
4	(Switzerland) H Laaksonen	6	6
7	(Russia) A Kudryavtsev	6	6
(Estonia) J Zopp	3	0
Q	(Japan) Shuichi Sekiguchi	5	3
PR	(Slovenia) B Kavčič	7	6
Alt	(Slovakia) N Gombos	7^{8}	3	4
Q	(Japan) Y Uchiyama	6^{6}	6	6
(Israel) A Weintraub	4	6	6
2	(Japan) T Ito	6	1	0

Second round
WC	(China) X Gao	0	1
(United States) A Sarkissian	6	6
(China) Z Li	1	4
4	(Switzerland) H Laaksonen	6	6
7	(Russia) A Kudryavtsev	3	5
PR	(Slovenia) B Kavčič	6	7
Q	(Japan) Y Uchiyama	6	7
(Israel) A Weintraub	2	5

Quarterfinals
(United States) A Sarkissian	2	2
4	(Switzerland) H Laaksonen	6	6
PR	(Slovenia) B Kavčič	5	3
Q	(Japan) Y Uchiyama	7	6

Semifinals
4	(Switzerland) H Laaksonen	6	7
Q	(Japan) Y Uchiyama	3	5
