= 2013 Shanghai Challenger – Doubles =

Doubles
- 2013 Shanghai Challenger

Final
- Champions: (Thailand) Sanchai Ratiwatana (Thailand) Sonchat Ratiwatana
- Runners-up: (Chinese Taipei) Lee Hsin-han (Chinese Taipei) Peng Hsien-yin
- Score: 6–3, 6–4

Events
Singles	Doubles
← 2012 ·	Shanghai Challenger	· 2014 →

Sanchai Ratiwatana and Sonchat Ratiwatana were the two-time defending champion, and successfully defended their title against Lee Hsin-han and Peng Hsien-yin 6–3, 6–4.

== Seeds ==
1. (Thailand) Sanchai Ratiwatana / (Thailand) Sonchat Ratiwatana (champions)
2. (Chinese Taipei) Lee Hsin-han / (Chinese Taipei) Peng Hsien-yin (finals)
3. (Australia) Alex Bolt / (New Zealand) Artem Sitak (first round)
4. (Japan) Toshihide Matsui / (Thailand) Danai Udomchoke (first round)

== Draw ==
=== Key ===
- Q = Qualifier
- WC = Wild card
- LL = Lucky loser
- Alt = Alternate
- ITF = ITF entry
- PR = Protected ranking
- SR = Special ranking
- SE = Special exempt
- JE = Junior exempt
- JR = Junior Accelerator Programme entrant
- CO = College Accelerator Programme entrant
- NG = Next Gen Accelerator Program entrant
- w/o = Walkover
- r = Retired
- d = Defaulted

=== Draw ===
First round
1	(Thailand) Sa Ratiwatana (Thailand) So Ratiwatana	6	6
WC	(China) Feng He (China) B Ouyang	4	2
(China) D Wu (Chinese Taipei) T-h Yang	4	6	[10]
(Japan) H Kondo (New Zealand) J Statham	6	2	[8]
4	(Japan) T Matsui (Thailand) D Udomchoke	4	6	[5]
(Japan) Shuichi Sekiguchi (New Zealand) M Venus	6	3	[10]
WC	(Chinese Taipei) J-c Hung (China) C Wang	2	6	[12]
WC	(China) A Wang (China) Zh Zhang	6	1	[10]
(China) M Gong (China) Ze Zhang	6	1	[12]
(Japan) Y Sugita (Japan) Y Uchiyama	4	6	[10]
(Chinese Taipei) T Chen (Chinese Taipei) L-c Huang	6	7^{7}
3	(Australia) A Bolt (New Zealand) A Sitak	4	6^{3}
(South Korea) Y-k Lim (South Korea) J-s Nam	6^{8}	6	[10]
(Japan) T Ito (Japan) H Moriya	7^{10}	2	[8]
(South Korea) Kim Cheong-Eui (South Korea) J-w Na	4	4
2	(Chinese Taipei) H-h Lee (Chinese Taipei) H-y Peng	6	6

Quarterfinals
1	(Thailand) Sa Ratiwatana (Thailand) So Ratiwatana	6	6
(China) D Wu (Chinese Taipei) T-h Yang	4	3
(Japan) S Sekiguchi (New Zealand) M Venus	6	6
WC	(Chinese Taipei) J-c Hung (China) C Wang	3	4
(China) M Gong (China) Ze Zhang	2	6	[10]
(Chinese Taipei) T Chen (Chinese Taipei) L-c Huang	6	4	[7]
(Japan) T Ito (Japan) H Moriya	3	5
2	(Chinese Taipei) H-h Lee (Chinese Taipei) H-y Peng	6	7

Semifinals
1	(Thailand) Sa Ratiwatana (Thailand) So Ratiwatana	6	6
(Japan) S Sekiguchi (New Zealand) M Venus	3	4
(China) M Gong (China) Ze Zhang	6	3	[9]
2	(Chinese Taipei) H-h Lee (Chinese Taipei) H-y Peng	3	6	[11]

Final
1	(Thailand) Sa Ratiwatana (Thailand) So Ratiwatana	6	6
2	(Chinese Taipei) H-h Lee (Chinese Taipei) H-y Peng	3	4
