= 2023 Shanghai Challenger – Singles =

Singles
- 2023 Shanghai Challenger

Final
- Champion: (Australia) Christopher O'Connell
- Runner-up: (Japan) Yosuke Watanuki
- Score: 6–3, 7–5

Events
Singles	Doubles
← 2019 ·	Shanghai Challenger	· 2024 →

Yasutaka Uchiyama was the defending champion but retired from his second round match against Christopher O'Connell.

O'Connell won the title after defeating Yosuke Watanuki 6–3, 7–5 in the final.

== Seeds ==
1. (Australia) Christopher O'Connell (champion)
2. (Japan) Yosuke Watanuki (final)
3. (Australia) Marc Polmans (first round)
4. (China) Shang Juncheng (semifinals)
5. (Chinese Taipei) Wu Tung-lin (second round)
6. (China) Bu Yunchaokete (second round)
7. (France) Térence Atmane (second round)
8. (Japan) Rio Noguchi (first round)

== Draw ==
Key

- Q = Qualifier
- WC = Wild card
- LL = Lucky loser
- Alt = Alternate
- ITF = ITF entry
- PR = Protected ranking
- SR = Special ranking
- SE = Special exempt
- JE = Junior exempt
- JR = Junior Accelerator Programme entrant
- CO = College Accelerator Programme entrant
- NG = Next Gen Accelerator Program entrant
- w/o = Walkover
- r = Retired
- d = Defaulted

=== Finals ===
Semifinals
1	(Australia) Christopher O'Connell	6	6
(Australia) Li Tu	2	4
4	(China) Shang Juncheng	4	2
2	(Japan) Yosuke Watanuki	6	6

Final
1	(Australia) Christopher O'Connell	6	7
2	(Japan) Yosuke Watanuki	3	5

=== Top half ===
First round
1	(Australia) C O'Connell	6	6
(Australia) L Saville	4	0
WC	(China) Liu Hanyi	1	6^{4}
(Japan) Y Uchiyama	6	7^{7}
Q	(China) Mu Tao	3	6	5
Q	(China) Y Bai	6	4	7
(Czech Republic) D Palán	6	6
8	(Japan) R Noguchi	2	4
3	(Australia) M Polmans	1	3
(Poland) F Peliwo	6	6
(Australia) P Sekulic	1	0
(Australia) L Tu	6	6
(Switzerland) A Bellier	6	7
Q	(India) A Kadhe	4	5
(Australia) O Jasika	3	6^{1}
7	(France) T Atmane	6	7^{7}

Second round
1	(Australia) C O'Connell	7^{7}	4
(Japan) Y Uchiyama	6^{3}	1^{r}
Q	(China) Y Bai	6	6
(Czech Republic) D Palán	3	2
(Poland) F Peliwo	6^{5}	2
(Australia) L Tu	7^{7}	6
(Switzerland) A Bellier	7^{7}	3	6
7	(France) T Atmane	6^{5}	6	4

Quarterfinals
1	(Australia) C O'Connell	6	6
Q	(China) Y Bai	0	2
(Australia) L Tu	7^{8}	6
(Switzerland) A Bellier	6^{6}	2

Semifinals
1	(Australia) C O'Connell	6	6
(Australia) L Tu	2	4

=== Bottom half ===
First round
6	(China) Y Bu	6	6
WC	(China) R Te	2	4
(Japan) H Moriya	1	2
(Italy) L Giustino	6	6
Alt	(India) M Sasikumar	3	4
(Australia) D Sweeny	6	6
LL	(Latvia) R Strombachs	4	6^{4}
4	(China) J Shang	6	7^{7}
5	(Chinese Taipei) T-l Wu	7^{7}	3	6
WC	(China) F Sun	6^{5}	6	2
Q	(Vietnam) NH Lý	5	6	6
Q	(United States) N Chappell	7	4	0
Q	(United States) A Ayeni	2	6	3
SE	Mikalai Haliak	6	3	6
(Australia) A Bolt	4	0
2	(Japan) Y Watanuki	6	6

Second round
6	(China) Y Bu	1	4
(Italy) L Giustino	6	6
(Australia) D Sweeny	4	3
4	(China) J Shang	6	6
5	(Chinese Taipei) T-l Wu	6	1	2
Q	(Vietnam) NH Lý	3	6	6
SE	M Haliak	1	1
2	(Japan) Y Watanuki	6	6

Quarterfinals
(Italy) L Giustino	1	4
4	(China) J Shang	6	6
Q	(Vietnam) NH Lý	2	0
2	(Japan) Y Watanuki	6	6

Semifinals
4	(China) J Shang	4	2
2	(Japan) Y Watanuki	6	6
