= 2011 Shanghai Challenger – Doubles =

Doubles
- 2011 Shanghai Challenger

Final
- Champions: (Thailand) Sanchai Ratiwatana (Thailand) Sonchat Ratiwatana
- Runners-up: (South Africa) Fritz Wolmarans (United States) Michael Yani
- Score: 7–6^{(7–4)}, 6–3

Events
Singles	Doubles
← 2010 ·	Shanghai Challenger	· 2012 →

Sanchai Ratiwatana and Sonchat Ratiwatana won the first edition of this tournament, defeating Fritz Wolmarans and Michael Yani 7–6^{(7–4)}, 6–3 in the final.

== Seeds ==
1. (Chinese Taipei) Chen Ti / (Chinese Taipei) Jimmy Wang (first round)
2. (Thailand) Sanchai Ratiwatana / (Thailand) Sonchat Ratiwatana (champions)
3. (United States) John Paul Fruttero / (South Africa) Raven Klaasen (semifinals)
4. (South Africa) Rik de Voest / (Germany) Dominik Meffert (first round)

== Draw ==
=== Key ===
- Q = Qualifier
- WC = Wild card
- LL = Lucky loser
- Alt = Alternate
- SE = Special exempt
- PR = Protected ranking
- ITF = ITF entry
- JE = Junior exempt
- w/o = Walkover
- r = Retired
- d = Defaulted
- SR = Special ranking

=== Draw ===
First round
1	(Chinese Taipei) T Chen (Chinese Taipei) J Wang	3	2
(Chinese Taipei) H-h Lee (Chinese Taipei) T-h Yang	6	6
(Czech Republic) J Hernych (Estonia) J Zopp	6	6
(Finland) H Heliövaara (Ukraine) D Molchanov	4	3
4	(South Africa) R de Voest (Germany) D Meffert	6	3	[7]
(South Africa) F Wolmarans (United States) M Yani	4	6	[10]
WC	(China) Ma Yanan (China) Xue Feng	4	2
(Japan) H Kondo (India) D Sharan	6	6
(Germany) S Rieschick (Germany) C-M Stebe	6	4	[7]
(China) Z Li (China) D Wu	1	6	[10]
(Uzbekistan) F Dustov (Italy) R Ghedin	3	4
3	(United States) JP Fruttero (South Africa) R Klaasen	6	6
WC	(China) M Gong (China) Z Zhang	6	6
(Canada) P-L Duclos (United States) N Monroe	4	4
(Canada) É Chvojka (New Zealand) J Statham	4	5
2	(Thailand) Sa Ratiwatana (Thailand) So Ratiwatana	6	7

Quarterfinals
(Chinese Taipei) H-h Lee (Chinese Taipei) T-h Yang	7^{7}	4	[10]
(Czech Republic) J Hernych (Estonia) J Zopp	6^{4}	6	[6]
(South Africa) F Wolmarans (United States) M Yani	2	7	[10]
(Japan) H Kondo (India) D Sharan	6	5	[6]
(China) Z Li (China) D Wu	3	2
3	(United States) JP Fruttero (South Africa) R Klaasen	6	6
WC	(China) M Gong (China) Z Zhang	5	4
2	(Thailand) Sa Ratiwatana (Thailand) So Ratiwatana	7	6

Semifinals
(Chinese Taipei) H-h Lee (Chinese Taipei) T-h Yang	3	6	[6]
(South Africa) F Wolmarans (United States) M Yani	6	4	[10]
3	(United States) JP Fruttero (South Africa) R Klaasen	3	4
2	(Thailand) Sa Ratiwatana (Thailand) So Ratiwatana	6	6

Final
(South Africa) F Wolmarans (United States) M Yani	6^{4}	3
2	(Thailand) Sa Ratiwatana (Thailand) So Ratiwatana	7^{7}	6
