= 2015 Shanghai Challenger – Doubles =

Doubles
- 2015 Shanghai Challenger

Final
- Champions: (China) Wu Di (Chinese Taipei) Yi Chu-huan
- Runners-up: (Italy) Thomas Fabbiano (Italy) Luca Vanni
- Score: 6–3, 7–5

Events
Singles	Doubles
← 2014 ·	Shanghai Challenger	· 2016 →

Yuki Bhambri and Divij Sharan are the defending champions, but chose not to participate.

== Seeds ==
1. (Thailand) Sanchai Ratiwatana / (Thailand) Sonchat Ratiwatana (quarterfinals)
2. (Italy) Riccardo Ghedin / (Japan) Toshihide Matsui (first round)
3. (Chinese Taipei) Hsieh Cheng-peng / (Australia) Andrew Whittington (first round)
4. (India) Sriram Balaji / (India) Saketh Myneni (quarterfinals)

== Draw ==
=== Key ===
- Q = Qualifier
- WC = Wild card
- LL = Lucky loser
- Alt = Alternate
- SE = Special exempt
- PR = Protected ranking
- ITF = ITF entry
- JE = Junior exempt
- w/o = Walkover
- r = Retired
- d = Defaulted
- SR = Special ranking

First round
1	(Thailand) Sa Ratiwatana (Thailand) So Ratiwatana	6	7^{7}
PR	(Chinese Taipei) H-h Lee (Israel) A Weintraub	4	6^{5}
(Chinese Taipei) T Chen (Chinese Taipei) L-c Huang	4	0
(China) D Wu (Chinese Taipei) C-h Yi	6	6
4	(India) S Balaji (India) S Myneni	2	6	[10]
(China) Z Li (Japan) H Moriya	6	2	[6]
(Germany) P Gojowczyk (Estonia) J Zopp	7	7
(Mexico) H Hach Verdugo (United States) A Sarkissian	5	5
(China) M Gong (China) Z Zhang	7	5	[6]
(Colombia) N Barrientos (Argentina) M Trungelliti	5	7	[10]
WC	(China) Y He (China) Zhuoyang Qiu	6	3
3	(Chinese Taipei) C-p Hsieh (Australia) A Whittington	4	6	[7]
WC	(China) He Feng (China) Yuqing Ning	4	7	[10]
WC	(China) Y Bai (Chinese Taipei) T-h Yang	6	5	[8]
(Italy) T Fabbiano (Italy) L Vanni	6	4	[13]
2	(Italy) R Ghedin (Japan) T Matsui	4	6	[11]

Quarterfinals
1	(Thailand) Sa Ratiwatana (Thailand) So Ratiwatana	6^{6}	6	[3]
(China) D Wu (Chinese Taipei) C-h Yi	7^{8}	4	[10]
4	(India) S Balaji (India) S Myneni	1	1
(Germany) P Gojowczyk (Estonia) J Zopp	6	6
(Colombia) N Barrientos (Argentina) M Trungelliti	2	6^{0}
WC	(China) Y He (China) Z Qiu	6	7^{7}
WC	(China) H Feng (China) Y Ning	6^{10}	3
(Italy) T Fabbiano (Italy) L Vanni	7^{12}	6

Semifinals
(China) D Wu (Chinese Taipei) C-h Yi	6	3	[10]
(Germany) P Gojowczyk (Estonia) J Zopp	3	6	[8]
WC	(China) Y He (China) Z Qiu	6^{4}	3
(Italy) T Fabbiano (Italy) L Vanni	7^{7}	6

Final
(China) D Wu (Chinese Taipei) C-h Yi	6	7
(Italy) T Fabbiano (Italy) L Vanni	3	5
