= 2014 Shanghai Challenger – Singles =

Singles
- 2014 Shanghai Challenger

Final
- Champion: (Japan) Yoshihito Nishioka
- Runner-up: (India) Somdev Devvarman
- Score: 6–4, 6–7^{(5–7)}, 7–6^{(7–3)}

Events
Singles	Doubles
← 2013 ·	Shanghai Challenger	· 2015 →

Yoshihito Nishioka won his maiden ATP Challenger Tour title, defeating Somdev Devvarman 6–4, 6–7^{(5–7)}, 7–6^{(7–3)}.

== Seeds ==
1. (Japan) Go Soeda (quarterfinals)
2. (India) Somdev Devvarman (final)
3. (India) Yuki Bhambri (quarterfinals)
4. (Australia) James Duckworth (second round)
5. (Italy) Luca Vanni (Semifinsls)
6. (China) Zhang Ze (first round)
7. (China) Wu Di (quarterfinals)
8. (Italy) Thomas Fabbiano (semifinals)

== Draw ==
=== Key ===
- Q = Qualifier
- WC = Wild card
- LL = Lucky loser
- Alt = Alternate
- ITF = ITF entry
- PR = Protected ranking
- SR = Special ranking
- SE = Special exempt
- JE = Junior exempt
- JR = Junior Accelerator Programme entrant
- CO = College Accelerator Programme entrant
- NG = Next Gen Accelerator Program entrant
- w/o = Walkover
- r = Retired
- d = Defaulted

=== Finals ===
Semifinals
8	(Italy) Thomas Fabbiano	4	6	1
(Japan) Yoshihito Nishioka	6	0	6
5	(Italy) Luca Vanni	6	4	4
2	(India) Somdev Devvarman	1	6	6

Final
(Japan) Yoshihito Nishioka	6	6^{5}	7^{7}
2	(India) Somdev Devvarman	4	7^{7}	6^{3}

=== Top half ===
First round
1	(Japan) G Soeda	6	3	6
(United States) J Jung	2	6	2
(Chinese Taipei) L-c Huang	6	3	3
(Japan) Y Uchiyama	4	6	6
(Australia) J Thompson	0	7^{7}	7
Q	(China) Z Li	6	6^{2}	5
WC	(China) Wei Qiang Zheng	3	4
8	(Italy) T Fabbiano	6	6
4	(Australia) J Duckworth	6	3	6
(Sweden) E Ymer	4	6	0
(Japan) Y Nishioka	6	6
(China) C Wang	3	1
(South Korea) H Chung	2	1
(Thailand) D Udomchoke	6	6
PR	(Australia) J Millman	6	6
6	(China) Z Zhang	2	2

Second round
1	(Japan) G Soeda	6	6
(Japan) Y Uchiyama	3	3
(Australia) J Thompson	4	4
8	(Italy) T Fabbiano	6	6
4	(Australia) J Duckworth	4	6^{2}
(Japan) Y Nishioka	6	7^{7}
(Thailand) D Udomchoke	3	7^{7}	6
PR	(Australia) J Millman	6	6^{4}	3

Quarterfinals
1	(Japan) G Soeda	4	6^{0}
8	(Italy) T Fabbiano	6	7^{7}
(Japan) Y Nishioka	4	6	6
(Thailand) D Udomchoke	6	2	3

Semifinals
8	(Italy) T Fabbiano	4	6	1
(Japan) Y Nishioka	6	0	6

=== Bottom half ===
First round
5	(Italy) L Vanni	3	6	7
PR	(New Zealand) J Rubin Statham	6	4	5
(Japan) Yuuya Kibi	1	2
Q	(India) S Singh	6	6
(Chinese Taipei) T-h Yang	7	6
(United Kingdom) K Edmund	5	2
(Chinese Taipei) T Chen	5	2
3	(India) Y Bhambri	7	6
7	(China) D Wu	7	6
(Japan) T Matsui	5	3
WC	(China) Y Bai	3	6	1
WC	(China) Su Hao Zhong	6	1	0^{r}
(Japan) T Niki	6	6
Q	(Japan) K Takeuchi	2	3
Q	(Japan) Y Ito	6^{4}	3
2	(India) S Devvarman	7^{7}	6

Second round
5	(Italy) L Vanni	6	3	6
Q	(India) S Singh	4	6	3
(Chinese Taipei) T-h Yang	3	7^{7}	3
3	(India) Y Bhambri	6	6^{4}	6
7	(China) D Wu	6	6^{3}	3
WC	(China) Y Bai	2	7^{7}	0^{r}
(Japan) T Niki	7^{7}	2	3
2	(India) S Devvarman	6^{4}	6	6

Quarterfinals
5	(Italy) L Vanni	7	6^{3}	6
3	(India) Y Bhambri	5	7^{7}	2
7	(China) D Wu	2	4
2	(India) S Devvarman	6	6

Semifinals
5	(Italy) L Vanni	6	4	4
2	(India) S Devvarman	1	6	6
