= 2012 Shanghai Challenger – Singles =

Singles
- 2012 Shanghai Challenger

Final
- Champion: (Chinese Taipei) Lu Yen-hsun
- Runner-up: (Germany) Peter Gojowczyk
- Score: 7–5, 6–0

Events
Singles	Doubles
← 2011 ·	Shanghai Challenger	· 2013 →

Cedrik-Marcel Stebe was the defending champion but decided not to participate.
Lu Yen-hsun defeated Peter Gojowczyk 7–5, 6–0 in the final to win the tournament.

== Seeds ==
1. (Chinese Taipei) Lu Yen-hsun (champion)
2. (Japan) Tatsuma Ito (second round)
3. (Israel) Dudi Sela (first round)
4. (Japan) Yūichi Sugita (semifinals)
5. (China) Zhang Ze (quarterfinals)
6. (India) Yuki Bhambri (second round)
7. (Israel) Amir Weintraub (second round)
8. (China) Wu Di (second round)

== Draw ==
=== Key ===
- Q = Qualifier
- WC = Wild card
- LL = Lucky loser
- Alt = Alternate
- SE = Special exempt
- PR = Protected ranking
- ITF = ITF entry
- JE = Junior exempt
- w/o = Walkover
- r = Retired
- d = Defaulted
- SR = Special ranking

=== Finals ===
Semifinals
1	(Chinese Taipei) Lu Yen-hsun	6	6
4	(Japan) Yūichi Sugita	4	0
(Germany) Peter Gojowczyk	5	7^{7}	6
(United States) Michael Yani	7	6^{5}	4

Final
1	(Chinese Taipei) Lu Yen-hsun	7	6
(Germany) Peter Gojowczyk	5	0

=== Top half ===
First round
1	(Chinese Taipei) Y-h Lu	6	6
(Germany) Stefan Seifert	2	0
Q	(New Zealand) J Statham	3	7^{8}	7^{7}
(Chinese Taipei) T-h Yang	6	6^{6}	6^{5}
WC	(China) Z Li	4	2
Q	(India) S Singh	6	6
(Australia) M Reid	6^{5}	4
6	(India) Y Bhambri	7^{7}	6
4	(Japan) Y Sugita	6	6
(Ukraine) D Molchanov	2	1
SE	(Indonesia) C Rungkat	6	7
WC	(Chinese Taipei) Wang Chieh-fu	4	5
WC	(China) Chang Yu	7^{14}	6
(Chinese Taipei) T Chen	6^{12}	3
Q	(France) A Dupuis	3	1
5	(China) Z Zhang	6	6

Second round
1	(Chinese Taipei) Y-h Lu	7	6
Q	(New Zealand) J Statham	5	1
Q	(India) S Singh	7^{7}	1	6
6	(India) Y Bhambri	6^{4}	6	2
4	(Japan) Y Sugita	6	5	6
SE	(Indonesia) C Rungkat	1	7	2
WC	(China) Chang Yu	4	4
5	(China) Z Zhang	6	6

Quarterfinals
1	(Chinese Taipei) Y-h Lu	6	6
Q	(India) S Singh	2	3
4	(Japan) Y Sugita	6	6
5	(China) Z Zhang	1	3

Semifinals
1	(Chinese Taipei) Y-h Lu	6	6
4	(Japan) Y Sugita	4	0

=== Bottom half ===
First round
7	(Israel) A Weintraub	6	6
WC	(China) Ouyang Bowen	3	2
(Australia) J Millman	2	6	6
SE	(China) M Gong	6	4	1
(Germany) P Gojowczyk	6	6
(United States) M McClune	4	3
(Japan) H Moriya	4	7^{10}	7
3	(Israel) D Sela	6	6^{4}	5
8	(China) D Wu	4	6	6
(Switzerland) S Bohli	6	3	0
Q	(Slovakia) Norbert Gomboš	2	4
(United Kingdom) J Ward	6	6
(India) V Vardhan	5	4
(United States) M Yani	7	6
(Australia) B Mitchell	6^{5}	7^{7}	2
2	(Japan) T Ito	7^{7}	6^{5}	6

Second round
7	(Israel) A Weintraub	6^{3}	4
(Australia) J Millman	7^{7}	6
(Germany) P Gojowczyk	6	6
(Japan) H Moriya	3	3
8	(China) D Wu	6^{4}	4
(United Kingdom) J Ward	7^{7}	6
(United States) M Yani	6	2	6
2	(Japan) T Ito	4	6	3

Quarterfinals
(Australia) J Millman	2	7^{7}	2
(Germany) P Gojowczyk	6	6^{4}	6
(United Kingdom) J Ward	5^{r}
(United States) M Yani	7

Semifinals
(Germany) P Gojowczyk	5	7^{7}	6
(United States) M Yani	7	6^{5}	4
