= 2012 Shanghai Challenger – Doubles =

Doubles
- 2012 Shanghai Challenger

Final
- Champions: (Thailand) Sanchai Ratiwatana (Thailand) Sonchat Ratiwatana
- Runners-up: (India) Yuki Bhambri (India) Divij Sharan
- Score: 6–4, 6–4

Events
Singles	Doubles
← 2011 ·	Shanghai Challenger	· 2013 →

Sanchai Ratiwatana and Sonchat Ratiwatana successfully defended their title by defeating Yuki Bhambri and Divij Sharan 6–4, 6–4 in the final.

== Seeds ==
1. (Thailand) Sanchai Ratiwatana / (Thailand) Sonchat Ratiwatana (champions)
2. (India) Yuki Bhambri / (India) Divij Sharan (final)
3. (Ukraine) Denys Molchanov / (India) Vishnu Vardhan (first round)
4. (Chinese Taipei) Lee Hsin-han / (Chinese Taipei) Peng Hsien-yin (quarterfinals)

== Draw ==
=== Key ===
- Q = Qualifier
- WC = Wild card
- LL = Lucky loser
- Alt = Alternate
- SE = Special exempt
- PR = Protected ranking
- ITF = ITF entry
- JE = Junior exempt
- w/o = Walkover
- r = Retired
- d = Defaulted
- SR = Special ranking

=== Draw ===
First round
1	(Thailand) Sa Ratiwatana (Thailand) So Ratiwatana	7^{7}	7
(New Zealand) D King-Turner (New Zealand) J Statham	6^{5}	5
(United Kingdom) J Ward (United States) M Yani	6	4	5
(Japan) H Moriya (Japan) Y Uchiyama	4	6	[10]
4	(Chinese Taipei) H-h Lee (Chinese Taipei) H-y Peng	6	6
(Chinese Taipei) L-c Huang (Chinese Taipei) Yi Chu-huan	2	4
(Chinese Taipei) T Chen (Israel) A Weintraub	6	7
(Japan) H Kondo (Australia) J Millman	3	5
(Germany) P Gojowczyk (Germany) K Krawietz	3	0
(New Zealand) A Sitak (Chinese Taipei) T-h Yang	6	6
WC	(China) Gao Xin (China) Z Li	6^{2}	6	[10]
3	(Ukraine) D Molchanov (India) V Vardhan	7^{7}	4	[6]
WC	(China) M Gong (China) Z Zhang	w/o
(Japan) T Ito (Japan) Y Sugita
WC	(China) Chang Yu (China) D Wu	6	6^{7}	[6]
2	(India) Y Bhambri (India) D Sharan	3	7^{9}	[10]

Quarterfinals
1	(Thailand) Sa Ratiwatana (Thailand) So Ratiwatana	3	6	[10]
(Japan) H Moriya (Japan) Y Uchiyama	6	3	[6]
4	(Chinese Taipei) H-h Lee (Chinese Taipei) H-y Peng	7	2	[6]
(Chinese Taipei) T Chen (Israel) A Weintraub	5	6	[10]
(New Zealand) A Sitak (Chinese Taipei) T-h Yang	3	6	[7]
WC	(China) Gao Xin (China) Z Li	6	3	[10]
WC	(China) M Gong (China) Z Zhang	7^{7}	4	[6]
2	(India) Y Bhambri (India) D Sharan	6^{4}	6	[10]

Semifinals
1	(Thailand) Sa Ratiwatana (Thailand) So Ratiwatana	6	6
(Chinese Taipei) T Chen (Israel) A Weintraub	2	3
WC	(China) Gao Xin (China) Z Li	4	6^{5}
2	(India) Y Bhambri (India) D Sharan	6	7^{7}

Final
1	(Thailand) Sa Ratiwatana (Thailand) So Ratiwatana	6	6
2	(India) Y Bhambri (India) D Sharan	4	4
