= 2013 Shanghai Challenger – Singles =

Singles
- 2013 Shanghai Challenger

Final
- Champion: (Japan) Yūichi Sugita
- Runner-up: (Japan) Hiroki Moriya
- Score: 6–3, 6–3

Events
Singles	Doubles
← 2012 ·	Shanghai Challenger	· 2014 →

Lu Yen-hsun was the defending champion but decided not to participate.
Yūichi Sugita defeated Hiroki Moriya 6–3, 6–3 in the final.

== Seeds ==
1. (Slovenia) Blaž Kavčič (second round)
2. (Chinese Taipei) Jimmy Wang (withdrew)
3. (Japan) Yūichi Sugita (champion)
4. (Japan) Tatsuma Ito (quarterfinals)
5. (Japan) Hiroki Moriya (final)
6. (China) Zhang Ze (semifinals)
7. (Tunisia) Malek Jaziri (quarterfinals)
8. (Chinese Taipei) Huang Liang-chi (first round)
9. (Australia) Benjamin Mitchell (second round)

== Draw ==
=== Key ===
- Q = Qualifier
- WC = Wild card
- LL = Lucky loser
- Alt = Alternate
- SE = Special exempt
- PR = Protected ranking
- ITF = ITF entry
- JE = Junior exempt
- w/o = Walkover
- r = Retired
- d = Defaulted
- SR = Special ranking

=== Finals ===
Semifinals
6	(China) Zhang Ze	3	1
3	(Japan) Yūichi Sugita	6	6
5	(Japan) Hiroki Moriya	6	6
Q	(Japan) Yasutaka Uchiyama	1	3

Final
3	(Japan) Yūichi Sugita	6	6
5	(Japan) Hiroki Moriya	3	3

=== Top half ===
First round
1	(Slovenia) B Kavčič	6	6
(Australia) A Bolt	4	3
(China) D Wu	6	6
(China) M Gong	2	3
(South Korea) J-w Na	7	6
(South Korea) Y-k Lim	6^{1}	3
(Japan) H Kondo	6	1	2
6	(China) Z Zhang	4	6	6
3	(Japan) Y Sugita	6	7^{7}
WC	(Chinese Taipei) C-f Wang	2	6^{5}
WC	(China) C Wang	6^{0}	2
(New Zealand) M Venus	7^{7}	6
(New Zealand) A Sitak	6^{4}	3
(New Zealand) J Statham	7^{7}	6
(Japan) Shuichi Sekiguchi	4	5
7	(Tunisia) M Jaziri	6	7

Second round
1	(Slovenia) B Kavčič	1	7^{7}	3
(China) D Wu	6	6^{4}	6
(South Korea) J-w Na	6^{4}	2
6	(China) Z Zhang	7^{7}	6
3	(Japan) Y Sugita	6	4	6
(New Zealand) M Venus	1	6	3
(New Zealand) J Statham	6^{4}	6^{5}
7	(Tunisia) M Jaziri	7^{7}	7^{7}

Quarterfinals
(China) D Wu	6	2	6
6	(China) Z Zhang	2	6	7
3	(Japan) Y Sugita	3	6	6
7	(Tunisia) M Jaziri	6	3	2

Semifinals
6	(China) Z Zhang	3	1
3	(Japan) Y Sugita	6	6

=== Bottom half ===
First round
5	(Japan) H Moriya	6^{3}	7	6
LL	(China) Wang Riukai	7^{7}	5	2
WC	(China) B Ouyang	4	3
(Russia) A Kudryavtsev	6	6
Q	(South Korea) J-s Nam	3	4
(Chinese Taipei) T-h Yang	6	6
(South Korea) S-y Jeong	7	6^{0}	2
4	(Japan) T Ito	5	7^{7}	6
8	(Chinese Taipei) L-c Huang	3	4
Q	(Japan) T Matsui	6	6
(Thailand) D Udomchoke	6	3	4
(Chinese Taipei) T Chen	4	6	6
Q	(Japan) Y Uchiyama	3	6	7^{9}
Q	(China) Zh Zhang	6	4	6^{7}
WC	(China) Y Bai	1	1
9	(Australia) B Mitchell	6	6

Second round
5	(Japan) H Moriya	6	6
(Russia) A Kudryavtsev	3	2
(Chinese Taipei) T-h Yang	1	2
4	(Japan) T Ito	6	6
Q	(Japan) T Matsui	6	2	6
(Chinese Taipei) T Chen	3	6	4
Q	(Japan) Y Uchiyama	4	7^{11}	6
9	(Australia) B Mitchell	6	6^{9}	4

Quarterfinals
5	(Japan) H Moriya	4	6	6
4	(Japan) T Ito	6	4	4
Q	(Japan) T Matsui	3	0	r
Q	(Japan) Y Uchiyama	6	4

Semifinals
5	(Japan) H Moriya	6	6
Q	(Japan) Y Uchiyama	1	3
