= 2023 Shanghai Challenger – Doubles =

Doubles
- 2023 Shanghai Challenger

Final
- Champions: (Australia) Alex Bolt (Australia) Luke Saville
- Runners-up: (China) Bu Yunchaokete (China) Te Rigele
- Score: 4–6, 6–3, [11–9]

Events
Singles	Doubles
← 2019 ·	Shanghai Challenger	· 2024 →

Gao Xin and Sun Fajing were the defending champions but only Sun chose to defend his title, partnering Yasutaka Uchiyama. Sun and Uchiyama withdrew from their quarterfinals match against Alex Bolt and Luke Saville.

Bolt and Saville won the title after defeating Bu Yunchaokete and Te Rigele 4–6, 6–3, [11–9] in the final.

== Seeds ==
1. (Japan) Toshihide Matsui / (Japan) Kaito Uesugi (semifinals)
2. (India) Rithvik Choudary Bollipalli / (India) Arjun Kadhe (first round, retired)
3. (Australia) Alex Bolt / (Australia) Luke Saville (champions)
4. (Chinese Taipei) Ray Ho / (Australia) Matthew Romios (quarterfinals)

== Draw ==
Key

- Q = Qualifier
- WC = Wild card
- LL = Lucky loser
- Alt = Alternate
- ITF = ITF entry
- PR = Protected ranking
- SR = Special ranking
- SE = Special exempt
- JE = Junior exempt
- JR = Junior Accelerator Programme entrant
- CO = College Accelerator Programme entrant
- NG = Next Gen Accelerator Program entrant
- w/o = Walkover
- r = Retired
- d = Defaulted

First round
1	(Japan) T Matsui (Japan) K Uesugi	6	5	[10]
(Philippines) F Alcantara (Australia) O Jasika	3	7	[2]
(China) Mu Tao (China) Xiao Linang	2	6	[7]
(Switzerland) A Bellier (United States) N Chappell	6	4	[10]
3	(Australia) A Bolt (Australia) L Saville	6	6
(United States) A Ayeni (Australia) Dong Jiayang	3	4
(New Zealand) R Statham (United States) E Zhu	7^{7}	2	[6]
(China) Y Bu (China) R Te	6^{4}	6	[10]
(Northern Mariana Islands) C Sinclair (Australia) D Sweeny	6^{6}	6^{1}
4	(Chinese Taipei) R Ho (Australia) MC Romios	7^{8}	7^{7}
(Japan) R Noguchi (Latvia) R Strombachs	6	7
WC	(China) Zhang Linghao (China) Zheng Zhan	2	5
PR	(Greece) M Kalovelonis (Greece) S Sakellaridis	2
2	(India) RC Bollipalli (India) A Kadhe	3^{r}

Quarterfinals
1	(Japan) T Matsui (Japan) K Uesugi	6	6
(Switzerland) A Bellier (United States) N Chappell	3	2
3	(Australia) A Bolt (Australia) L Saville	w/o
(China) F Sun (Japan) Y Uchiyama
(China) Y Bu (China) R Te	6	6
4	(Chinese Taipei) R Ho (Australia) MC Romios	3	3
(Japan) R Noguchi (Latvia) R Strombachs	7	6
PR	(Greece) M Kalovelonis (Greece) S Sakellaridis	5	3

Semifinals
1	(Japan) T Matsui (Japan) K Uesugi	6	3	[9]
3	(Australia) A Bolt (Australia) L Saville	4	6	[11]
(China) Y Bu (China) R Te	6	6
(Japan) R Noguchi (Latvia) R Strombachs	4	3

Final
3	(Australia) A Bolt (Australia) L Saville	4	6	[11]
(China) Y Bu (China) R Te	6	3	[9]
