= 2014 Shanghai Challenger – Doubles =

Doubles
- 2014 Shanghai Challenger

Final
- Champions: (India) Yuki Bhambri (India) Divij Sharan
- Runners-up: (India) Somdev Devvarman (India) Sanam Singh
- Score: 7–6^{(7–2)}, 6–7^{(4–7)}, [10–8]

Events
Singles	Doubles
← 2013 ·	Shanghai Challenger	· 2015 →

Yuki Bhambri and Divij Sharan triumphed in an all Indian final, beating Somdev Devvarman and Sanam Singh 7–6^{(7–2)}, 6–7^{(4–7)}, [10–8].

== Seeds ==
1. (Thailand) Sanchai Ratiwatana / (Thailand) Sonchat Ratiwatana (quarterfinals)
2. (Chinese Taipei) Chen Ti / (Chinese Taipei) Peng Hsien-yin (semifinals)
3. (India) Yuki Bhambri / (India) Divij Sharan (champions)
4. (Chinese Taipei) Lee Hsin-han / (Thailand) Danai Udomchoke (quarterfinals)

== Draw ==
=== Key ===
- Q = Qualifier
- WC = Wild card
- LL = Lucky loser
- Alt = Alternate
- SE = Special exempt
- PR = Protected ranking
- ITF = ITF entry
- JE = Junior exempt
- w/o = Walkover
- r = Retired
- d = Defaulted
- SR = Special ranking

=== Draw ===
First round
1	(Thailand) S Ratiwatana (Thailand) S Ratiwatana	6	7
(China) M Gong (China) Z Li	3	5
(Chinese Taipei) L-c Huang (Sweden) E Ymer	w/o
(India) S Devvarman (India) S Singh
4	(Chinese Taipei) H-h Lee (Thailand) D Udomchoke	5	6	[10]
WC	(China) Zhuoyang Qiu (China) A Wang	7	2	[5]
PR	(Japan) Y Nishioka (New Zealand) J Rubin Statham	3	6^{2}
(Republic of Ireland) J Cluskey (United Kingdom) K Edmund	6	7^{7}
(Japan) Bumpei Sato (Japan) G Soeda	3	3
(Italy) T Fabbiano (Italy) L Vanni	6	6
WC	(China) Y Bai (China) C Wang	4	4
3	(India) Y Bhambri (India) D Sharan	6	6
(China) D Wu (China) Z Zhang	6	7^{7}
WC	(China) Xiao Gong (China) Yi-Feng Li	4	6^{5}
(Japan) T Matsui (Japan) Y Uchiyama	4	6	[8]
2	(Chinese Taipei) T Chen (Chinese Taipei) H-y Peng	6	3	[10]

Quarterfinals
1	(Thailand) S Ratiwatana (Thailand) S Ratiwatana	4	6^{4}
(India) S Devvarman (India) S Singh	6	7^{7}
4	(Chinese Taipei) H-h Lee (Thailand) D Udomchoke	6	5	[7]
(Republic of Ireland) J Cluskey (United Kingdom) K Edmund	2	7	[10]
(Italy) T Fabbiano (Italy) L Vanni	3	5
3	(India) Y Bhambri (India) D Sharan	6	7
(China) D Wu (China) Z Zhang	6^{5}	4
2	(Chinese Taipei) T Chen (Chinese Taipei) H-y Peng	7^{7}	6

Semifinals
(India) S Devvarman (India) S Singh	7^{7}	6
(Republic of Ireland) J Cluskey (United Kingdom) K Edmund	6^{2}	3
3	(India) Y Bhambri (India) D Sharan	7^{7}	7^{8}
2	(Chinese Taipei) T Chen (Chinese Taipei) H-y Peng	6^{2}	6^{6}

Final
(India) S Devvarman (India) S Singh	6^{2}	7^{7}	[8]
3	(India) Y Bhambri (India) D Sharan	7^{7}	6^{4}	[10]
