= 2015 Shanghai Challenger – Singles =

Singles
- 2015 Shanghai Challenger

Final
- Champion: (India) Yuki Bhambri
- Runner-up: (China) Wu Di
- Score: 3–6, 6–0, 7–6^{(7–3)}

Events
Singles	Doubles
← 2014 ·	Shanghai Challenger	· 2016 →

Yoshihito Nishioka was the defending champion, but chose not to defend his title.

== Seeds ==
1. (Japan) Tatsuma Ito (first round)
2. (Japan) Go Soeda (second round)
3. (Italy) Luca Vanni (first round)
4. (India) Yuki Bhambri (champion)
5. (Estonia) Jürgen Zopp (first round)
6. (India) Somdev Devvarman (first round)
7. (Germany) Peter Gojowczyk (second round)
8. (Japan) Yūichi Sugita (quarterfinals)

== Draw ==
=== Key ===
- Q = Qualifier
- WC = Wild card
- LL = Lucky loser
- Alt = Alternate
- SE = Special exempt
- PR = Protected ranking
- ITF = ITF entry
- JE = Junior exempt
- w/o = Walkover
- r = Retired
- d = Defaulted
- SR = Special ranking

=== Finals ===
Semifinals
Q	(Russia) Daniil Medvedev	3	0^{r}
4	(India) Yuki Bhambri	6	3
(China) Wu Di	6	6
(Argentina) Marco Trungelliti	2	4

Final
4	(India) Yuki Bhambri	3	6	7^{7}
(China) Wu Di	6	0	6^{3}

=== Top half ===
First round
1	(Japan) T Ito	7^{7}	4	3
(Italy) T Fabbiano	6^{3}	6	6
(China) Z Li	1	5
WC	(China) Y Bai	6	7
Q	(Russia) D Medvedev	6	6
(South Korea) D-h Lee	4	0
(Chinese Taipei) T Chen	6	1	2
7	(Germany) P Gojowczyk	3	6	6
4	(India) Y Bhambri	6	6
WC	(China) Z Zhang	2	2
(Chinese Taipei) L-c Huang	2	4
(China) Z Zhang	6	6
Q	(India) S Balaji	4	3
(India) S Myneni	6	6
(Australia) J Thompson	6	7
5	(Estonia) J Zopp	1	5

Second round
(Italy) T Fabbiano	6	3	6
WC	(China) Y Bai	3	6	0
Q	(Russia) D Medvedev	6^{3}	7^{7}	6
7	(Germany) P Gojowczyk	7^{7}	6^{3}	4
4	(India) Y Bhambri	7	6
WC	(China) Z Zhang	5	3
(India) S Myneni	6	3	2
(Australia) J Thompson	3	6	6

Quarterfinals
(Italy) T Fabbiano	4	4
Q	(Russia) D Medvedev	6	6
4	(India) Y Bhambri	6	6
(Australia) J Thompson	2	2

Semifinals
Q	(Russia) D Medvedev	3	0^{r}
4	(India) Y Bhambri	6	3

=== Bottom half ===
First round
8	(Japan) Y Sugita	6	7
WC	(China) R Hua	3	5
Q	(United States) N Meister	6	2	6
WC	(China) Y He	1	6	4
(Japan) H Moriya	6	6^{8}	1
(China) D Wu	4	7^{10}	6
PR	(Israel) A Weintraub	7^{7}	3	6
3	(Italy) L Vanni	6^{3}	6	3
6	(India) S Devvarman	4	6	4
(Colombia) N Barrientos	6	2	6
(United States) A Sarkissian	6	4	4
(Chinese Taipei) T-h Yang	2	6	6
(Chinese Taipei) J Wang	3	2
(Argentina) M Trungelliti	6	6
Q	(Australia) A Whittington	2	1
2	(Japan) G Soeda	6	6

Second round
8	(Japan) Y Sugita	6	7^{7}
Q	(United States) N Meister	4	6^{5}
(China) D Wu	7	6
PR	(Israel) A Weintraub	5	0
(Colombia) N Barrientos	7^{7}	6^{6}	6
(Chinese Taipei) T-h Yang	6^{1}	7^{8}	3
(Argentina) M Trungelliti	6	6
2	(Japan) G Soeda	3	2

Quarterfinals
8	(Japan) Y Sugita	2	6	6^{4}
(China) D Wu	6	2	7^{7}
(Colombia) N Barrientos	3	4
(Argentina) M Trungelliti	6	6

Semifinals
(China) D Wu	6	6
(Argentina) M Trungelliti	2	4
