= 2015 Shanghai Challenger =

- Date: 7–13 September
- Edition: 5th
- Surface: Hard
- Location: Shanghai, China

Champions

Singles
- (India) Yuki Bhambri

Doubles
- (China) Wu Di / (Chinese Taipei) Yi Chu-huan
← 2014 ·	Shanghai Challenger	· 2016 →

The 2015 Shanghai Challenger was a professional tennis tournament played on hard courts. It was the fifth edition of the tournament which was part of the 2015 ATP Challenger Tour. It took place in Shanghai, China between 7 and 13 September 2015.

== Singles main-draw entrants ==
=== Seeds ===
Country	Player	Rank^{1}	Seed
JPN	Tatsuma Ito	96	1
JPN	Go Soeda	111	2
ITA	Luca Vanni	123	3
IND	Yuki Bhambri	145	4
EST	Jürgen Zopp	151	5
IND	Somdev Devvarman	152	6
GER	Peter Gojowczyk	153	7
JPN	Yūichi Sugita	157	8

- ^{1} Rankings are as of August 31, 2015.

=== Other entrants ===
The following players received wildcards into the singles main draw:

- (China) Bai Yan
- (China) He Yecong
- (China) Hua Runhao
- (China) Zhang Zhizhen

The following players received entry courtesy of a protected ranking:

- (Israel) Amir Weintraub

The following players received entry from the qualifying draw:

- (India) Sriram Balaji
- (Russia) Daniil Medvedev
- (United States) Nicolas Meister
- (Australia) Andrew Whittington

== Champions ==
=== Singles ===
- (India) Yuki Bhambri def. (China) Wu Di 3–6, 6–0, 7–6^{(7–3)}

=== Doubles ===
- (China) Wu Di / (Chinese Taipei) Yi Chu-huan def. (Italy) Thomas Fabbiano / (Italy) Luca Vanni 6–3, 7–5
