= 2017 Shanghai Challenger =

- Date: 11–17 September
- Edition: 7th
- Surface: Hard
- Location: Shanghai, China

Champions

Singles
- (China) Wu Yibing

Doubles
- (Japan) Toshihide Matsui / (Chinese Taipei) Yi Chu-huan
← 2016 ·	Shanghai Challenger	· 2018 →

The 2017 Shanghai Challenger was a professional tennis tournament played on hard courts. It was the seventh edition of the tournament which was part of the 2017 ATP Challenger Tour. It took place in Shanghai, China between 11 and 17 September 2017.

== Singles main-draw entrants ==
=== Seeds ===
Country	Player	Rank^{1}	Seed
TPE	Lu Yen-hsun	63	1
CAN	Peter Polansky	128	2
KOR	Lee Duck-hee	163	3
JPN	Tatsuma Ito	172	4
JPN	Hiroki Moriya	213	5
EGY	Mohamed Safwat	219	6
CHN	Wu Di	221	7
AUS	Marc Polmans	236	8

- ^{1} Rankings are as of 28 August 2017.

=== Other entrants ===
The following players received wildcards into the singles main draw:

- (China) Sun Fajing
- (China) Wang Chuhan
- (China) Wu Yibing
- (China) Zhang Zhizhen

The following player received entry into the singles main draw using a protected ranking:

- (United States) Bradley Klahn

The following players received entry from the qualifying draw:

- (Japan) Yuya Kibi
- (Australia) Bradley Mousley
- (Japan) Kento Takeuchi
- (China) Xia Zihao

== Champions ==
=== Singles ===
- (China) Wu Yibing def. (Chinese Taipei) Lu Yen-hsun 7–6^{(8–6)}, 0–0 ret.

=== Doubles ===
- (Japan) Toshihide Matsui / (Chinese Taipei) Yi Chu-huan def. (United States) Bradley Klahn / (Canada) Peter Polansky 6–7^{(1–7)}, 6–4, [10–5].
