= 2011 Shanghai Challenger – Singles =

Singles
- 2011 Shanghai Challenger

Final
- Champion: (Germany) Cedrik-Marcel Stebe
- Runner-up: (Russia) Alexandre Kudryavtsev
- Score: 6–4, 4–6, 7–5

Events
Singles	Doubles
← 2010 ·	Shanghai Challenger	· 2012 →

This was the first edition of the tournament. Cedrik-Marcel Stebe won the final against Alexandre Kudryavtsev 6–4, 4–6, 7–5.

== Seeds ==
1. (Chinese Taipei) Lu Yen-hsun (first round)
2. (Germany) Rainer Schüttler (first round, retired due to left thigh injury)
3. (Japan) Go Soeda (first round)
4. (South Africa) Rik de Voest (second round)
5. (Japan) Tatsuma Ito (second round)
6. (United Kingdom) James Ward (second round)
7. (Russia) Alexandre Kudryavtsev (final)
8. (Germany) Cedrik-Marcel Stebe (champion)

== Draw ==
=== Key ===
- Q = Qualifier
- WC = Wild card
- LL = Lucky loser
- Alt = Alternate
- SE = Special exempt
- PR = Protected ranking
- ITF = ITF entry
- JE = Junior exempt
- w/o = Walkover
- r = Retired
- d = Defaulted
- SR = Special ranking

=== Finals ===
Semifinals
(Estonia) Jürgen Zopp	2	5
8	(Germany) Cedrik-Marcel Stebe	6	7
7	(Russia) Alexandre Kudryavtsev	6	6
(Czech Republic) Jan Hernych	3	0

Final
8	(Germany) Cedrik-Marcel Stebe	6	4	7
7	(Russia) Alexandre Kudryavtsev	4	6	5

=== Top half ===
First round
1	(Chinese Taipei) Y-h Lu	2	3
(Finland) H Heliövaara	6	6
WC	(China) Z Li	2	3
(South Africa) R Klaasen	6	6
(Chinese Taipei) T Chen	6^{4}	6	3
(Estonia) J Zopp	7^{7}	0	6
(South Korea) Y-k Lim	6	3	4
6	(United Kingdom) J Ward	3	6	6
4	(South Africa) R de Voest	6	7^{7}
Q	(South Korea) D Yoo	1	6^{1}
Q	(Japan) Hiroki Moriya	2	3
Q	(Slovenia) L Gregorc	6	6
(United States) N Monroe	6	6
(Canada) É Chvojka	0	3
(Uzbekistan) F Dustov	6^{5}	6	4
8	(Germany) C-M Stebe	7^{7}	1	6

Second round
(Finland) H Heliövaara	7	6
(South Africa) R Klaasen	5	1
(Estonia) J Zopp	6	6
6	(United Kingdom) J Ward	4	2
4	(South Africa) R de Voest	4	6^{3}
Q	(Slovenia) L Gregorc	6	7^{7}
(United States) N Monroe	0	3
8	(Germany) C-M Stebe	6	6

Quarterfinals
(Finland) H Heliövaara	1	7^{8}	3
(Estonia) J Zopp	6	6^{6}	6
Q	(Slovenia) L Gregorc	3	5
8	(Germany) C-M Stebe	6	7

Semifinals
(Estonia) J Zopp	2	5
8	(Germany) C-M Stebe	6	7

=== Bottom half ===
First round
7	(Russia) A Kudryavtsev	6	6
WC	(China) Z Zhang	3	3
(France) L Walter	3	0
WC	(China) M Gong	6	6
WC	(China) D Wu	6	6^{6}	6
(Germany) S Rieschick	3	7^{8}	2
(Chinese Taipei) T-h Yang	7^{10}	6
3	(Japan) G Soeda	6^{8}	3
5	(Japan) T Ito	7^{8}	7^{0}
(United Kingdom) J Baker	6^{6}	6^{0}
(Czech Republic) J Hernych	4	6	6
(United States) M Yani	6	2	2
Q	(Canada) P-L Duclos	6	3	4
(Germany) D Meffert	3	6	6
(South Africa) F Wolmarans	3
2	(Germany) R Schüttler	3^{r}

Second round
7	(Russia) A Kudryavtsev	6	6
WC	(China) M Gong	4	0
WC	(China) D Wu	2	4
(Chinese Taipei) T-h Yang	6	6
5	(Japan) T Ito	3	6	0
(Czech Republic) J Hernych	6	2	6
(Germany) D Meffert	3	6	6
(South Africa) F Wolmarans	6	1	4

Quarterfinals
7	(Russia) A Kudryavtsev	6	6
(Chinese Taipei) T-h Yang	1	2
(Czech Republic) J Hernych	6	6
(Germany) D Meffert	3	2

Semifinals
7	(Russia) A Kudryavtsev	6	6
(Czech Republic) J Hernych	3	0
