= 2012 Shanghai Challenger =

- Date: 3–9 September
- Edition: 2nd
- Surface: Hard
- Location: Shanghai, China

Champions

Singles
- (Chinese Taipei) Lu Yen-hsun

Doubles
- (Thailand) Sanchai Ratiwatana / (Thailand) Sonchat Ratiwatana
← 2011 ·	Shanghai Challenger	· 2013 →

The 2012 Shanghai Challenger was a professional tennis tournament played on hard courts. It was the second edition of the tournament which was part of the 2012 ATP Challenger Tour. It took place in Shanghai, China between 3 and 9 September 2012.

== Singles main-draw entrants ==
=== Seeds ===
Country	Player	Rank^{1}	Seed
TPE	Lu Yen-hsun	64	1
JPN	Tatsuma Ito	67	2
ISR	Dudi Sela	109	3
JPN	Yūichi Sugita	163	4
CHN	Zhang Ze	171	5
IND	Yuki Bhambri	188	6
ISR	Amir Weintraub	200	7
CHN	Wu Di	206	8

- ^{1} Rankings are as of August 27, 2012.

=== Other entrants ===
The following players received wildcards into the singles main draw:

- (China) Chang Yu
- (China) Li Zhe
- (China) Ouyang Bowen
- (Chinese Taipei) Wang Chieh-fu

The following players received entry as a special exempt into the singles main draw:

- (China) Gong Maoxin
- (Indonesia) Christopher Rungkat

The following players received entry from the qualifying draw:

- (France) Antony Dupuis
- (Slovakia) Norbert Gomboš
- (India) Sanam Singh
- (New Zealand) Jose Statham

== Champions ==
=== Singles ===
- (Chinese Taipei) Lu Yen-hsun def. (Germany) Peter Gojowczyk, 7–5, 6–0

=== Doubles ===
- (Thailand) Sanchai Ratiwatana / (Thailand) Sonchat Ratiwatana def. (India) Yuki Bhambri / (India) Divij Sharan, 6–4, 6–4
