= 2023 Shanghai Challenger =

2023 Tennis tournament

- Date: 4–10 September
- Edition: 10th
- Surface: Hard
- Location: Shanghai, China

Champions

Singles
- (Australia) Christopher O'Connell

Doubles
- (Australia) Alex Bolt / (Australia) Luke Saville
← 2019 ·	Shanghai Challenger	· 2024 →

The 2023 Shanghai Challenger, or Road to the Rolex Shanghai Masters, was a professional tennis tournament played on hardcourts. It was the 10th edition of the tournament which was part of the 2023 ATP Challenger Tour. It took place in Shanghai, China between 4 and 10 September 2023.

== Singles main-draw entrants ==
=== Seeds ===
Country	Player	Rank^{1}	Seed
AUS	Christopher O'Connell	68	1
JPN	Yosuke Watanuki	98	2
AUS	Marc Polmans	174	3
CHN	Shang Juncheng	178	4
TPE	Wu Tung-lin	188	5
CHN	Bu Yunchaokete	214	6
FRA	Térence Atmane	218	7
JPN	Rio Noguchi	251	8

- ^{1} Rankings are as of 28 August 2023.

=== Other entrants ===
The following players received wildcards into the singles main draw:

- (China) Liu Hanyi
- (China) Sun Fajing
- (China) Te Rigele

The following player received entry into the singles main draw as a special exempt:

- Mikalai Haliak

The following player received entry into the singles main draw as an alternate:

- (India) Mukund Sasikumar

The following players received entry from the qualifying draw:

- (United States) Alafia Ayeni
- (China) Bai Yan
- (United States) Nick Chappell
- (India) Arjun Kadhe
- (Vietnam) Lý Hoàng Nam
- (China) Mu Tao

The following player received entry as a lucky loser:

- (Latvia) Robert Strombachs

== Champions ==
=== Singles ===
- (Australia) Christopher O'Connell def. (Japan) Yosuke Watanuki 6–3, 7–5.

=== Doubles ===
- (Australia) Alex Bolt / (Australia) Luke Saville def. (China) Bu Yunchaokete / (China) Te Rigele 4–6, 6–3, [11–9].
