= 2017 Shanghai Challenger – Doubles =

Doubles
- 2017 Shanghai Challenger

Final
- Champions: (Japan) Toshihide Matsui (Chinese Taipei) Yi Chu-huan
- Runners-up: (United States) Bradley Klahn (Canada) Peter Polansky
- Score: 6–7^{(1–7)}, 6–4, [10–5]

Events
Singles	Doubles
- Shanghai Challenger

Hsieh Cheng-peng and Yi Chu-huan were the defending champions, but chose to defend their title with different partners. Hsieh partnered Zhang Ze but lost in the first round to Wu Yibing and Wu Di. Yi partnered Toshihide Matsui and successfully defended his title.

Matsui and Yi won the title after defeating Bradley Klahn and Peter Polansky 6–7^{(1–7)}, 6–4, [10–5] in the final.

== Seeds ==
1. (United States) James Cerretani / (Australia) Marc Polmans (semifinals)
2. (Chinese Taipei) Hsieh Cheng-peng / (China) Zhang Ze (first round)
3. (Japan) Toshihide Matsui / (Chinese Taipei) Yi Chu-huan (champions)
4. (Australia) Jarryd Chaplin / (Australia) Luke Saville (quarterfinals)

== Draw ==
Key

- Q = Qualifier
- WC = Wild card
- LL = Lucky loser
- Alt = Alternate
- ITF = ITF entry
- PR = Protected ranking
- SR = Special ranking
- SE = Special exempt
- JE = Junior exempt
- JR = Junior Accelerator Programme entrant
- CO = College Accelerator Programme entrant
- NG = Next Gen Accelerator Program entrant
- w/o = Walkover
- r = Retired
- d = Defaulted

First round
1	(United States) J Cerretani (Australia) M Polmans	6	7
(China) C Wang (China) Zh Zhang	3	5
(Japan) T Niki (Japan) Y Takahashi	6	7
(Australia) O Jasika (Australia) D Kelly	4	5
4	(Australia) Jarryd Chaplin (Australia) L Saville	3	6	[10]
(China) X Gao (China) Z Li	6	4	[2]
(United States) B Klahn (Canada) P Polansky	6	7
WC	(China) F Sun (China) Xia Zihao	2	5
(Canada) S Diez (Japan) H Moriya	4	3
(United States) M Giron (New Zealand) J Statham	6	6
WC	(China) J Cui (China) Wu Hao	4	4
3	(Japan) T Matsui (Chinese Taipei) C-h Yi	6	6
(Russia) E Karlovskiy (Russia) A Kudryavtsev	0	1
(Germany) M Bachinger (Australia) B Mousley	6	6
WC	(China) D Wu (China) Y Wu	2	6	[12]
2	(Chinese Taipei) C-p Hsieh (China) Ze Zhang	6	3	[10]

Quarterfinals
1	(United States) J Cerretani (Australia) M Polmans	6	7^{7}
(Japan) T Niki (Japan) Y Takahashi	2	6^{2}
4	(Australia) J Chaplin (Australia) L Saville	3	4
(United States) B Klahn (Canada) P Polansky	6	6
(United States) M Giron (New Zealand) J Statham	6	1	[10]
3	(Japan) T Matsui (Chinese Taipei) C-h Yi	4	6	[12]
(Germany) M Bachinger (Australia) B Mousley	3	6^{3}
WC	(China) D Wu (China) Y Wu	6	7^{7}

Semifinals
1	(United States) J Cerretani (Australia) M Polmans	6	6^{4}	[7]
(United States) B Klahn (Canada) P Polansky	3	7^{7}	[10]
3	(Japan) T Matsui (Chinese Taipei) C-h Yi	6	6
WC	(China) D Wu (China) Y Wu	4	3

Final
(United States) B Klahn (Canada) P Polansky	7^{7}	4	[5]
3	(Japan) T Matsui (Chinese Taipei) C-h Yi	6^{1}	6	[10]
