= 2019 Shanghai Challenger – Singles =

Singles
- 2019 Shanghai Challenger

Final
- Champion: (Japan) Yasutaka Uchiyama
- Runner-up: (China) Wu Di
- Score: 6–4, 7–6^{(7–4)}

Events
Singles	Doubles
- Shanghai Challenger

Blaž Kavčič was the defending champion but chose not to defend his title.

Yasutaka Uchiyama won the title after defeating Wu Di 6–4, 7–6^{(7–4)} in the final.

== Seeds ==
All seeds receive a bye into the second round.

1. (India) Prajnesh Gunneswaran (semifinals)
2. (Japan) Tatsuma Ito (third round)
3. (Japan) Yūichi Sugita (semifinals)
4. (Japan) Yasutaka Uchiyama (champion)
5. (Australia) Marc Polmans (second round)
6. (Canada) Steven Diez (third round)
7. (Australia) Andrew Harris (quarterfinals, retired)
8. (Japan) Hiroki Moriya (quarterfinals)
9. (Spain) Enrique López Pérez (quarterfinals)
10. (Australia) Max Purcell (third round)
11. (Spain) Roberto Ortega Olmedo (third round)
12. (Australia) Akira Santillan (third round, retired)
13. (India) Saketh Myneni (second round)
14. (Australia) Aleksandar Vukic (second round)
15. (Japan) Kaichi Uchida (third round)
16. (Portugal) Gonçalo Oliveira (third round)

== Draw ==
Key

- Q = Qualifier
- WC = Wild card
- LL = Lucky loser
- Alt = Alternate
- ITF = ITF entry
- PR = Protected ranking
- SR = Special ranking
- SE = Special exempt
- JE = Junior exempt
- JR = Junior Accelerator Programme entrant
- CO = College Accelerator Programme entrant
- NG = Next Gen Accelerator Program entrant
- w/o = Walkover
- r = Retired
- d = Defaulted

=== Finals ===
Quarterfinals
1	(India) Prajnesh Gunneswaran	6	6
8	(Japan) Hiroki Moriya	4	4
4	(Japan) Yasutaka Uchiyama	7^{7}	2
7	(Australia) Andrew Harris	6^{1}	1^{r}
9	(Spain) Enrique López Pérez	4	6^{3}
3	(Japan) Yūichi Sugita	6	7^{7}
WC	(China) Wu Di	6	6
(United States) Collin Altamirano	4	0

Semifinals
1	(India) Prajnesh Gunneswaran	6^{7}	4
4	(Japan) Yasutaka Uchiyama	7^{9}	6
3	(Japan) Yūichi Sugita	4	6^{2}
WC	(China) Wu Di	6	7^{7}

Final
4	(Japan) Yasutaka Uchiyama	6	7^{7}
WC	(China) Wu Di	4	6^{4}

=== Top half ===
==== Section 1 ====
First round
(United Kingdom) J Ward	6	6
(Japan) Renta Tokuda	3	4
WC	(China) Wang Chukang	6	4	2
(France) TK Wang	4	6	6
(Switzerland) L Castelnuovo	5	7^{7}	5
(Australia) L Saville	7	6^{3}	7
(United States) E King	2	6^{5}
(China) F Sun	6	7^{7}

Second round
1	(India) P Gunneswaran	6	7^{7}
(United Kingdom) J Ward	4	6^{3}
(France) TK Wang	7^{7}	3	4
16	(Portugal) G Oliveira	6^{3}	6	6
10	(Australia) M Purcell	4	7	6
(Australia) L Saville	6	5	3
(China) F Sun	2	7	2
8	(Japan) H Moriya	6	5	6

Third round
1	(India) P Gunneswaran	6	6
16	(Portugal) G Oliveira	3	4
10	(Australia) M Purcell	6	6^{2}	1
8	(Japan) H Moriya	4	7^{7}	6

Quarterfinals
1	(India) P Gunneswaran	6	6
8	(Japan) H Moriya	4	4

==== Section 2 ====
First round
(India) A Kadhe	7^{7}	6
(Japan) Shintaro Imai	6^{2}	3
(Australia) Jacob Grills	6	1	1
(Japan) Shuichi Sekiguchi	3	6	6
(Russia) T Gabashvili	6	7
(Ukraine) V Orlov	2	5
PR	(Netherlands) Miliaan Niesten	4	2
(Japan) Makoto Ochi	6	6

Second round
4	(Japan) Y Uchiyama	7^{7}	6
(India) A Kadhe	6^{4}	3
(Japan) S Sekiguchi	4	6	7^{7}
13	(India) S Myneni	6	3	6^{4}
12	(Australia) A Santillan	6	6
(Russia) T Gabashvili	2	1
(Japan) M Ochi	6	2	6^{5}
7	(Australia) A Harris	4	6	7^{7}

Third round
4	(Japan) Y Uchiyama	6	6
(Japan) S Sekiguchi	4	3
12	(Australia) A Santillan	6	5^{r}
7	(Australia) A Harris	2	5

Quarterfinals
4	(Japan) Y Uchiyama	7^{7}	2
7	(Australia) A Harris	6^{1}	1^{r}

=== Bottom half ===
==== Section 3 ====
First round
(India) Sidharth Rawat	4	4
WC	(China) R Hua	6	6
Q	(Japan) Kazuki Nishiwaki	3	2
(Japan) Jumpei Yamasaki	6	6
Q	(China) Chuh Wang	4	4
(Japan) Y Takahashi	6	6
(Australia) T Fancutt	6	6^{4}	6^{8}
(Australia) H Bourchier	3	7^{7}	7^{10}

Second round
6	(Canada) S Diez	7	6
WC	(China) R Hua	5	3
(Japan) J Yamasaki	4	6	2
9	(Spain) E López Pérez	6	3	6
15	(Japan) K Uchida	4	7^{10}	6
(Japan) Y Takahashi	6	6^{8}	0
(Australia) H Bourchier	3	3
3	(Japan) Y Sugita	6	6

Third round
6	(Canada) S Diez	4	5
9	(Spain) E López Pérez	6	7
15	(Japan) K Uchida	6^{2}	3
3	(Japan) Y Sugita	7^{7}	6

Quarterfinals
9	(Spain) E López Pérez	4	6^{3}
3	(Japan) Y Sugita	6	7^{7}

==== Section 4 ====
First round
WC	(China) D Wu	6	0
(Netherlands) I Sijsling	3	0^{r}
WC	(China) Y He	6	6
(Argentina) A Velotti	3	2
(United States) C Altamirano	6	6
WC	(China) X Gao	1	1
(India) S Mukund	6	6
(United States) A Ayeni	4	1

Second round
5	(Australia) M Polmans	3	3
WC	(China) D Wu	6	6
WC	(China) Y He	2	3
11	(Spain) R Ortega Olmedo	6	6
14	(Australia) A Vukic	4	6^{4}
(United States) C Altamirano	6	7^{7}
(India) S Mukund	4	4
2	(Japan) T Ito	6	6

Third round
WC	(China) D Wu	6	5	7^{7}
11	(Spain) R Ortega Olmedo	1	7	6^{4}
(United States) C Altamirano	6	7^{7}
2	(Japan) T Ito	3	6^{4}

Quarterfinals
WC	(China) D Wu	6	6
(United States) C Altamirano	4	0
