= 2016 Shanghai Challenger – Doubles =

Doubles
- 2016 Shanghai Challenger

Final
- Champions: (Chinese Taipei) Hsieh Cheng-peng (Chinese Taipei) Yi Chu-huan
- Runners-up: (China) Gao Xin (China) Li Zhe
- Score: 7–6^{(8–6)}, 5–7, [10–0]

Events
Singles	Doubles
- Shanghai Challenger

Wu Di and Yi Chu-huan were the defending champions but chose not to compete together. Wu played alongside Zhang Zhizhen. Yi teamed up with Hsieh Cheng-peng. Wu lost in the quarterfinals to Gao Xin and Li Zhe.

Yi successfully defended his title, defeating Gao and Li 7–6^{(8–6)}, 5–7, [10–0] in the final.

== Seeds ==
1. (Thailand) Sanchai Ratiwatana / (Thailand) Sonchat Ratiwatana (quarterfinals)
2. (Belarus) Sergey Betov / (Ukraine) Denys Molchanov (first round)
3. (China) Gong Maoxin / (China) Zhang Ze (semifinals)
4. (Chinese Taipei) Hsieh Cheng-peng / (Chinese Taipei) Yi Chu-huan (champions)

== Draw ==
Key

- Q = Qualifier
- WC = Wild card
- LL = Lucky loser
- Alt = Alternate
- ITF = ITF entry
- PR = Protected ranking
- SR = Special ranking
- SE = Special exempt
- JE = Junior exempt
- JR = Junior Accelerator Programme entrant
- CO = College Accelerator Programme entrant
- NG = Next Gen Accelerator Program entrant
- w/o = Walkover
- r = Retired
- d = Defaulted

First round
1	(Thailand) Sa Ratiwatana (Thailand) So Ratiwatana	6	6
WC	(China) Z Qiu (China) Xia Zihao	2	2
(Russia) A Kudryavtsev (Japan) T Matsui	4	7	[11]
(Colombia) N Barrientos (Philippines) R Gonzales	6	5	[9]
4	(Chinese Taipei) C-p Hsieh (Chinese Taipei) C-h Yi	6	7^{7}
WC	(China) J Cui (China) F Sun	1	6^{3}
(Russia) A Karatsev (Estonia) J Zopp	6	7
(Australia) Jarryd Chaplin (United States) A Sarkissian	3	5
(India) J Nedunchezhiyan (Israel) A Weintraub	2	6^{1}
(Chinese Taipei) T Chen (Chinese Taipei) J Jung	6	7^{7}
PR	(Croatia) M Pecotić (Italy) L Vanni	1	4
3	(China) M Gong (China) Ze Zhang	6	6
WC	(China) D Wu (China) Zh Zhang	6	6
(Japan) T Ito (Japan) Y Uchiyama	2	2
(China) X Gao (China) Z Li	5	6	[10]
2	(Belarus) S Betov (Ukraine) D Molchanov	7	3	[8]

Quarterfinals
1	(Thailand) Sa Ratiwatana (Thailand) So Ratiwatana	6^{7}	6	[8]
(Russia) A Kudryavtsev (Japan) T Matsui	7^{9}	2	[10]
4	(Chinese Taipei) C-p Hsieh (Chinese Taipei) C-h Yi	6	4	[10]
(Russia) A Karatsev (Estonia) J Zopp	3	6	[6]
(Chinese Taipei) T Chen (Chinese Taipei) J Jung	6	3	[6]
3	(China) M Gong (China) Ze Zhang	1	6	[10]
WC	(China) D Wu (China) Zh Zhang	3	4
(China) X Gao (China) Z Li	6	6

Semifinals
(Russia) A Kudryavtsev (Japan) T Matsui	5	6^{5}
4	(Chinese Taipei) C-p Hsieh (Chinese Taipei) C-h Yi	7	7^{7}
3	(China) M Gong (China) Ze Zhang	7^{7}	4	[5]
(China) X Gao (China) Z Li	6^{3}	6	[10]

Final
4	(Chinese Taipei) C-p Hsieh (Chinese Taipei) C-h Yi	7^{8}	5	[10]
(China) X Gao (China) Z Li	6^{6}	7	[0]
