= 2024 Shanghai Challenger – Singles =

Singles
- 2024 Shanghai Challenger

Final
- Champion: (Japan) Sho Shimabukuro
- Runner-up: (Chinese Taipei) Hsu Yu-hsiou
- Score: 6–4, 6–4

Events
Singles	Doubles
← 2023 ·	Shanghai Challenger	· 2025 →

Christopher O'Connell was the defending champion but chose not to defend his title.

Sho Shimabukuro won the title after defeating Hsu Yu-hsiou 6–4, 6–4 in the final.

== Seeds ==
1. (Chile) Cristian Garín (first round)
2. (France) Térence Atmane (second round)
3. (China) Bu Yunchaokete (first round)
4. (Hong Kong) Coleman Wong (semifinals)
5. (South Korea) Hong Seong-chan (second round)
6. (Japan) Shintaro Mochizuki (withdrew)
7. (Chile) Tomás Barrios Vera (second round)
8. (United States) Maxime Cressy (second round)
9. (Chinese Taipei) Hsu Yu-hsiou (final)

== Draw ==
=== Key ===
- Q = Qualifier
- WC = Wild card
- LL = Lucky loser
- Alt = Alternate
- ITF = ITF entry
- PR = Protected ranking
- SR = Special ranking
- SE = Special exempt
- JE = Junior exempt
- JR = Junior Accelerator Programme entrant
- CO = College Accelerator Programme entrant
- NG = Next Gen Accelerator Program entrant
- w/o = Walkover
- r = Retired
- d = Defaulted

=== Finals ===
Semifinals
9	(Chinese Taipei) Hsu Yu-hsiou	6	6
Q	(Slovakia) Norbert Gombos	3	4
4	(Hong Kong) Coleman Wong	3	6^{2}
(Japan) Sho Shimabukuro	6	7^{7}

Final
9	(Chinese Taipei) Hsu Yu-hsiou	4	4
(Japan) Sho Shimabukuro	6	6

=== Top half ===
First round
1	(Chile) C Garín	3	1
Q	(South Africa) Kris van Wyk	6	6
Q	(Japan) R Noguchi	5	6^{4}
LL	(Argentina) FA Gómez	7	7^{7}
WC	(China) R Te	4	5
(Japan) Y Watanuki	6	7
WC	(China) Y Wu	7^{7}	3^{r}
9	(Chinese Taipei) Y-h Hsu	6^{5}	3
3	(China) Y Bu	3	6	3
(Australia) M Polmans	6	3	6
Q	(Slovakia) N Gombos	6	6
(United Kingdom) P Jubb	4	2
A Kachmazov	6	7^{9}
(Bosnia and Herzegovina) N Fatić	3	6^{7}
Q	(Australia) B Mott	1	1
8	(United States) M Cressy	6	6

Second round
Q	(South Africa) K van Wyk	6	6
LL	(Argentina) FA Gómez	4	4
(Japan) Y Watanuki	6	4	0^{r}
9	(Chinese Taipei) Y-h Hsu	2	6	4
(Australia) M Polmans	4	2
Q	(Slovakia) N Gombos	6	6
A Kachmazov	4	7^{7}	6
8	(United States) M Cressy	6	6^{3}	3

Quarterfinals
Q	(South Africa) K van Wyk	6^{4}	6	2
9	(Chinese Taipei) Y-h Hsu	7^{7}	2	6
Q	(Slovakia) N Gombos	6^{2}	7^{7}	6
A Kachmazov	7^{7}	6^{3}	4

Semifinals
9	(Chinese Taipei) Y-h Hsu	6	6
Q	(Slovakia) N Gombos	3	4

=== Bottom half ===
First round
7	(Chile) T Barrios Vera	6	7
LL	(China) F Sun	4	5
(Kazakhstan) B Zhukayev	2	6	7^{7}
Q	(New Zealand) A Rai	6	3	6^{3}
Alt	(United Kingdom) R Peniston	6	6
WC	(China) Y Zhou	4	2
E Gerasimov	6^{4}	1
4	(Hong Kong) C Wong	7^{7}	6
5	(South Korea) S-c Hong	6^{2}	6	6
Q	(Chinese Taipei) T-l Wu	7^{7}	4	4
Alt	(Czech Republic) D Svrčina	6	6
(Colombia) N Mejía	1	1
(China) Y Bai	5	3
(Japan) S Shimabukuro	7	6
(Estonia) M Lajal	6^{4}	6	1
2	(France) T Atmane	7^{7}	1	6

Second round
7	(Chile) T Barrios Vera	6^{4}	7^{7}	5
(Kazakhstan) B Zhukayev	7^{7}	6^{2}	7
Alt	(United Kingdom) R Peniston	2	3
4	(Hong Kong) C Wong	6	6
5	(South Korea) S-c Hong	5	3
Alt	(Czech Republic) D Svrčina	7	6
(Japan) S Shimabukuro	6	6
2	(France) T Atmane	4	3

Quarterfinals
(Kazakhstan) B Zhukayev	6^{6}	3
4	(Hong Kong) C Wong	7^{8}	6
Alt	(Czech Republic) D Svrčina	4	5
(Japan) S Shimabukuro	6	7

Semifinals
4	(Hong Kong) C Wong	3	6^{2}
(Japan) S Shimabukuro	6	7^{7}
