= 2014 Shanghai Challenger =

- Date: 1–7 September
- Edition: 4th
- Surface: Hard
- Location: Shanghai, China

Champions

Singles
- (Japan) Yoshihito Nishioka

Doubles
- (India) Yuki Bhambri / (India) Divij Sharan
← 2013 ·	Shanghai Challenger	· 2015 →

The 2014 Shanghai Challenger was a professional tennis tournament played on hard courts. It was the fourth edition of the tournament which was part of the 2014 ATP Challenger Tour. It took place in Shanghai, China between 1 and 7 September 2014.

== Singles main-draw entrants ==
=== Seeds ===
Country	Player	Rank^{1}	Seed
JPN	Go Soeda	106	1
IND	Somdev Devvarman	143	2
IND	Yuki Bhambri	151	3
AUS	James Duckworth	154	4
ITA	Luca Vanni	170	5
CHN	Zhang Ze	182	6
CHN	Wu Di	210	7
ITA	Thomas Fabbiano	224	8

- ^{1} Rankings are as of August 25, 2014.

=== Other entrants ===
The following players received wildcards into the singles main draw:

- (China) Bai Yan
- (China) Chuhan Wang
- (China) Wei Qiang Zheng
- (China) Su Hao Zhong

The following players entered using a protected ranking:

- (Australia) John Millman
- (New Zealand) Jose Rubin Statham

The following players received entry from the qualifying draw:

- (Japan) Yuichi Ito
- (India) Sanam Singh
- (Japan) Kento Takeuchi
- (China) Li Zhe

== Champions ==
=== Singles ===
- (Japan) Yoshihito Nishioka def. (India) Somdev Devvarman 6–4, 6–7^{(5–7)}, 7–6^{(7–3)}

=== Doubles ===
- (India) Yuki Bhambri / (India) Divij Sharan def. (India) Somdev Devvarman / (India) Sanam Singh 7–6^{(7–2)}, 6–7^{(4–7)}, [10–8]
