= 2011 Shanghai Challenger =

- Date: 5–11 September
- Edition: 1st
- Location: Shanghai, China

Champions

Singles
- (Germany) Cedrik-Marcel Stebe

Doubles
- (Thailand) Sanchai Ratiwatana / (Thailand) Sonchat Ratiwatana
Shanghai Challenger	· 2012 →

The 2011 Shanghai Challenger was a professional tennis tournament played on hard courts. It was the first edition of the tournament which was part of the 2011 ATP Challenger Tour. It took place in Shanghai, China between 5 and 11 September 2011.

== ATP entrants ==
=== Seeds ===
Country	Player	Rank^{1}	Seed
TPE	Lu Yen-hsun	82	1
GER	Rainer Schüttler	111	2
JPN	Go Soeda	123	3
RSA	Rik de Voest	124	4
JPN	Tatsuma Ito	127	5
GBR	James Ward	140	6
RUS	Alexander Kudryavtsev	145	7
GER	Cedrik-Marcel Stebe	151	8

- ^{1} Rankings are as of August 29, 2011.

=== Other entrants ===
The following players received wildcards into the singles main draw:

- (China) Gong Maoxin
- (China) Li Zhe
- (China) Wu Di
- (China) Zhang Ze

The following players received entry from the qualifying draw:

- (Canada) Pierre-Ludovic Duclos
- (Slovenia) Luka Gregorc
- (Japan) Hiroki Moriya
- (South Korea) Daniel Yoo

== Champions ==
=== Singles ===
(Germany) Cedrik-Marcel Stebe def. (Russia) Alexander Kudryavtsev, 6–4, 4–6, 7–5

=== Doubles ===
(Thailand) Sanchai Ratiwatana / (Thailand) Sonchat Ratiwatana def. (South Africa) Fritz Wolmarans / (United States) Michael Yani, 7–6^{(7–4)}, 6–3
