= 2024 Shanghai Challenger – Doubles =

Doubles
- 2024 Shanghai Challenger

Final
- Champions: (Colombia) Cristian Rodríguez (Australia) Matthew Romios
- Runners-up: (India) Rithvik Choudary Bollipalli (India) Arjun Kadhe
- Score: 7–6^{(7–4)}, 1–6, [10–7]

Events
Singles	Doubles
← 2023 ·	Shanghai Challenger	· 2025 →

Alex Bolt and Luke Saville were the defending champions but chose not to defend their title.

Cristian Rodríguez and Matthew Romios won the title after defeating Rithvik Choudary Bollipalli and Arjun Kadhe 7–6^{(7–4)}, 1–6, [10–7] in the final.

== Seeds ==
1. (Colombia) Cristian Rodríguez / (Australia) Matthew Romios (champions)
2. (India) Rithvik Choudary Bollipalli / (India) Arjun Kadhe (final)
3. (Chinese Taipei) Ray Ho / (South Korea) Nam Ji-sung (semifinals)
4. (Japan) Toshihide Matsui / (Japan) Kaito Uesugi (semifinals)

== Draw ==
=== Key ===
- Q = Qualifier
- WC = Wild card
- LL = Lucky loser
- Alt = Alternate
- SE = Special exempt
- PR = Protected ranking
- ITF = ITF entry
- JE = Junior exempt
- w/o = Walkover
- r = Retired
- d = Defaulted
- SR = Special ranking

=== Draw ===
First round
1	(Colombia) C Rodríguez (Australia) MC Romios	7^{7}	4	[10]
WC	(China) J Cui (China) Xiao Linang	6^{4}	6	[1]
Alt	(Australia) B Mott (New Zealand) K Pannu	2	2
PR	(Japan) S Shimabukuro (Japan) Y Watanuki	6	6
3	(Chinese Taipei) R Ho (South Korea) J-s Nam	6	6
(Japan) S Watanabe (Japan) T Yuzuki	1	4
WC	(Chinese Taipei) Y-h Hsu (China) F Sun	3	4
(Australia) M Polmans (United States) R Stalder	6	6
Alt	(France) T Lamasine (Czech Republic) D Svrčina	4	7	[10]
(New Zealand) F Reynolds (New Zealand) R Statham	6	5	[7]
(Philippines) FC Alcantara (Japan) K Uchida	3	2
4	(Japan) T Matsui (Japan) K Uesugi	6	6
(Argentina) FA Gómez (Colombia) N Mejía	4	3
(Australia) B Bayldon (Australia) T Fancutt	6	6
(Netherlands) D Pel (Netherlands) B Stevens	4	4
2	(India) RC Bollipalli (India) A Kadhe	6	6

Quarterfinals
1	(Colombia) C Rodríguez (Australia) MC Romios	w/o
PR	(Japan) S Shimabukuro (Japan) Y Watanuki
3	(Chinese Taipei) R Ho (South Korea) J-s Nam	6	2	[10]
(Australia) M Polmans (United States) R Stalder	4	6	[8]
Alt	(France) T Lamasine (Czech Republic) D Svrčina	4	4
4	(Japan) T Matsui (Japan) K Uesugi	6	6
(Australia) B Bayldon (Australia) T Fancutt	1	2
2	(India) RC Bollipalli (India) A Kadhe	6	6

Semifinals
1	(Colombia) C Rodríguez (Australia) MC Romios	6	7
3	(Chinese Taipei) R Ho (South Korea) J-s Nam	2	5
4	(Japan) T Matsui (Japan) K Uesugi	6	3	[7]
2	(India) RC Bollipalli (India) A Kadhe	4	6	[10]

Final
1	(Colombia) C Rodríguez (Australia) MC Romios	7^{7}	1	[10]
2	(India) RC Bollipalli (India) A Kadhe	6^{4}	6	[7]
