= 2017 Shanghai Challenger – Singles =

Singles
- 2017 Shanghai Challenger

Final
- Champion: (China) Wu Yibing
- Runner-up: (Chinese Taipei) Lu Yen-hsun
- Score: 7–6^{(8–6)}, 0–0 ret.

Events
Singles	Doubles
- Shanghai Challenger

Henri Laaksonen was the defending champion but chose not to defend his title.

Wu Yibing won the title after Lu Yen-hsun retired in the final after losing the first set 6–7^{(6–8)}.

== Seeds ==
1. (Chinese Taipei) Lu Yen-hsun (final)
2. (Canada) Peter Polansky (first round)
3. (South Korea) Lee Duck-hee (second round)
4. (Japan) Tatsuma Ito (second round)
5. (Japan) Hiroki Moriya (quarterfinals)
6. (Egypt) Mohamed Safwat (quarterfinals)
7. (China) Wu Di (second round)
8. (Australia) Marc Polmans (first round)

== Draw ==
Key

- Q = Qualifier
- WC = Wild card
- LL = Lucky loser
- Alt = Alternate
- ITF = ITF entry
- PR = Protected ranking
- SR = Special ranking
- SE = Special exempt
- JE = Junior exempt
- JR = Junior Accelerator Programme entrant
- CO = College Accelerator Programme entrant
- NG = Next Gen Accelerator Program entrant
- w/o = Walkover
- r = Retired
- d = Defaulted

=== Finals ===
Semifinals
1	(Chinese Taipei) Lu Yen-hsun	6	6
(China) Zhang Ze	1	2
(Germany) Matthias Bachinger	5	5
WC	(China) Wu Yibing	7	7

Final
1	(Chinese Taipei) Lu Yen-hsun	6^{6}	0^{r}
WC	(China) Wu Yibing	7^{8}	0

=== Top half ===
First round
1	(Chinese Taipei) Y-h Lu	6	6
(South Korea) Kim Cheong-eui	2	1
WC	(China) C Wang	4	3
(Australia) L Saville	6	6
Q	(China) Xia Zihao	2	7^{8}	6
(Japan) T Niki	6	6^{6}	1
(New Zealand) J Statham	2	4
6	(Egypt) M Safwat	6	6
3	(South Korea) D-h Lee	6	6
(Canada) S Diez	3	3
(China) Z Li	4	7	1
(China) Ze Zhang	6	5	6
WC	(China) F Sun	3	1
(Australia) D Kelly	6	6
(United States) M Giron	6^{6}	4
7	(China) D Wu	7^{8}	6

Second round
1	(Chinese Taipei) Y-h Lu	6	6
(Australia) L Saville	4	4
Q	(China) Z Xia	4	6^{3}
6	(Egypt) M Safwat	6	7^{7}
3	(South Korea) D-h Lee	3	6^{4}
(China) Ze Zhang	6	7^{7}
(Australia) D Kelly	7^{7}	4	6
7	(China) D Wu	6^{4}	6	2

Quarterfinals
1	(Chinese Taipei) Y-h Lu	6	7
6	(Egypt) M Safwat	2	5
(China) Ze Zhang	6	6
(Australia) D Kelly	3	2

Semifinals
1	(Chinese Taipei) Y-h Lu	6	6
(China) Ze Zhang	1	2

=== Bottom half ===
First round
8	(Australia) M Polmans	5	0
(Italy) A Bega	7	6
Q	(Australia) B Mousley	6^{5}	5
(Germany) M Bachinger	7^{7}	7
WC	(China) Zh Zhang	5	2
(Australia) O Jasika	7	6
PR	(United States) B Klahn	6	2	6^{5}
4	(Japan) T Ito	3	6	7^{7}
5	(Japan) H Moriya	6	6
(Japan) Y Takahashi	4	3
Q	(Japan) Yuya Kibi	6	6
Q	(Japan) K Takeuchi	4	4
(Russia) A Kudryavtsev	6	4	2
(Japan) Shuichi Sekiguchi	4	6	6
WC	(China) Y Wu	6	7^{7}
2	(Canada) P Polansky	3	6^{3}

Second round
(Italy) A Bega	3	2
(Germany) M Bachinger	6	6
(Australia) O Jasika	4	6	7
4	(Japan) T Ito	6	3	5
5	(Japan) H Moriya	6^{2}	6	6
Q	(Japan) Y Kibi	7^{7}	2	3
(Japan) S Sekiguchi	0^{r}
WC	(China) Y Wu	5

Quarterfinals
(Germany) M Bachinger	6	6
(Australia) O Jasika	1	1
5	(Japan) H Moriya	6^{5}	4
WC	(China) Y Wu	7^{7}	6

Semifinals
(Germany) M Bachinger	5	5
WC	(China) Y Wu	7	7
