= 2019 Shanghai Challenger =

- Date: 9–15 September
- Edition: 9th
- Surface: Hard
- Location: Shanghai, China

Champions

Singles
- (Japan) Yasutaka Uchiyama

Doubles
- (China) Gao Xin / (China) Sun Fajing
- Shanghai Challenger

The 2019 Shanghai Challenger was a professional tennis tournament played on hard courts. It was the ninth edition of the tournament which was part of the 2019 ATP Challenger Tour. It took place in Shanghai, China between 9 and 15 September 2019.

== Singles main-draw entrants ==
=== Seeds ===
Country	Player	Rank^{1}	Seed
IND	Prajnesh Gunneswaran	88	1
JPN	Tatsuma Ito	132	2
JPN	Yūichi Sugita	133	3
JPN	Yasutaka Uchiyama	141	4
AUS	Marc Polmans	156	5
CAN	Steven Diez	175	6
AUS	Andrew Harris	198	7
JPN	Hiroki Moriya	213	8
ESP	Enrique López Pérez	220	9
AUS	Max Purcell	237	10
ESP	Roberto Ortega Olmedo	242	11
AUS	Akira Santillan	243	12
IND	Saketh Myneni	249	13
AUS	Aleksandar Vukic	258	14
JPN	Kaichi Uchida	259	15
POR	Gonçalo Oliveira	265	16

- ^{1} Rankings are as of 26 August 2019.

=== Other entrants ===
The following players received wildcards into the singles main draw:

- (China) Gao Xin
- (China) He Yecong
- (China) Hua Runhao
- (China) Wang Chukang
- (China) Wu Di

The following player received entry into the singles main draw using a protected ranking:

- (Netherlands) Miliaan Niesten

The following players received entry from the qualifying draw:

- (Japan) Kazuki Nishiwaki
- (China) Wang Chuhan

== Champions ==
=== Singles ===
- (Japan) Yasutaka Uchiyama def. (China) Wu Di 6–4, 7–6^{(7–4)}.

=== Doubles ===
- (China) Gao Xin / (China) Sun Fajing def. (Australia) Marc Polmans / (Australia) Scott Puodziunas 2–6, 6–4, [10–7].
