= 2024 Shanghai Challenger =

- Date: 2–8 September
- Edition: 11th
- Surface: Hard
- Location: Shanghai, China

Champions

Singles
- (Japan) Sho Shimabukuro

Doubles
- (Colombia) Cristian Rodríguez / (Australia) Matthew Romios
← 2023 ·	Shanghai Challenger	· 2025 →

The 2024 Shanghai Challenger, or Road to the Rolex Shanghai Masters, was a professional tennis tournament played on hardcourts. It was the 11th edition of the tournament which was part of the 2024 ATP Challenger Tour. It took place in Shanghai, China between 2 and 8 September 2024.

== Singles main-draw entrants ==
=== Seeds ===
Country	Player	Rank^{1}	Seed
CHI	Cristian Garín	116	1
FRA	Térence Atmane	120	2
CHN	Bu Yunchaokete	123	3
HKG	Coleman Wong	149	4
KOR	Hong Seong-chan	152	5
~~JPN~~	~~Shintaro Mochizuki~~	~~153~~	~~6~~
CHI	Tomás Barrios Vera	160	7
USA	Maxime Cressy	161	8
TPE	Hsu Yu-hsiou	183	9

- ^{1} Rankings are as of 26 August 2024.

=== Other entrants ===
The following players received wildcards into the singles main draw:

- (China) Te Rigele
- (China) Wu Yibing
- (China) Zhou Yi

The following players received entry into the singles main draw as alternates:

- (United Kingdom) Ryan Peniston
- (Czech Republic) Dalibor Svrčina

The following players received entry from the qualifying draw:

- (Slovakia) Norbert Gombos
- (Australia) Blake Mott
- (Japan) Rio Noguchi
- (New Zealand) Ajeet Rai
- (South Africa) Kris van Wyk
- (Chinese Taipei) Wu Tung-lin

The following players received entry as lucky losers:

- (Argentina) Federico Agustín Gómez
- (China) Sun Fajing

== Champions ==
=== Singles ===
- (Japan) Sho Shimabukuro def. (Chinese Taipei) Hsu Yu-hsiou 6–4, 6–4.

=== Doubles ===
- (Colombia) Cristian Rodríguez / (Australia) Matthew Romios def. (India) Rithvik Choudary Bollipalli / (India) Arjun Kadhe 7–6^{(7–4)}, 1–6, [10–7].
