= 2018 Shanghai Challenger =

- Date: 10–16 September
- Edition: 8th
- Surface: Hard
- Location: Shanghai, China

Champions

Singles
- (Slovenia) Blaž Kavčič

Doubles
- (China) Gong Maoxin / (China) Zhang Ze
- Shanghai Challenger

The 2018 Shanghai Challenger was a professional tennis tournament played on hard courts. It was the eighth edition of the tournament which was part of the 2018 ATP Challenger Tour. It took place in Shanghai, China between 10 and 16 September 2018.

== Singles main-draw entrants ==
=== Seeds ===
Country	Player	Rank^{1}	Seed
TPE	Jason Jung	115	1
~~ESP~~	~~Enrique López Pérez~~	~~159~~	~~2~~
JPN	Tatsuma Ito	163	3
CHN	Zhang Ze	168	4
JPN	Go Soeda	176	5
CAN	Filip Peliwo	185	6
SRB	Miomir Kecmanović	196	7
JPN	Hiroki Moriya	197	8

- ^{1} Rankings are as of 27 August 2018.

=== Other entrants ===
The following players received wildcards into the singles main draw:

- (China) Hua Runhao
- (China) Te Rigele
- (China) Wu Yibing
- (China) Zhang Zhizhen

The following players received entry from the qualifying draw:

- (China) Bai Yan
- (Australia) Dayne Kelly
- (France) Tristan Lamasine
- (Bosnia and Herzegovina) Aldin Šetkić

The following player received entry as a lucky loser:

- (Norway) Viktor Durasovic

== Champions ==
=== Singles ===
- (Slovenia) Blaž Kavčič def. (Japan) Hiroki Moriya 6–1, 7–6^{(7–1)}.

=== Doubles ===
- (China) Gong Maoxin / (China) Zhang Ze def. (China) Hua Runhao / (China) Zhang Zhizhen 6–4, 3–6, [10–4].
