= 2013 Shanghai Challenger =

- Date: 2–8 September
- Edition: 3rd
- Surface: Hard
- Location: Shanghai, China

Champions

Singles
- (Japan) Yūichi Sugita

Doubles
- (Thailand) Sanchai Ratiwatana / (Thailand) Sonchat Ratiwatana
← 2012 ·	Shanghai Challenger	· 2014 →

The 2013 Shanghai Challenger was a professional tennis tournament played on hard courts. It was the third edition of the tournament which was part of the 2013 ATP Challenger Tour. It took place in Shanghai, China between 2 and 8 September 2013.

== Singles main-draw entrants ==
Country	Player	Rank^{1}	Seed
SLO	Blaž Kavčič	126	1
~~TPE~~	~~Jimmy Wang~~	~~139~~	~~2~~
JPN	Yūichi Sugita	148	3
JPN	Tatsuma Ito	165	4
JPN	Hiroki Moriya	181	5
CHN	Zhang Ze	182	6
TUN	Malek Jaziri	190	7
TPE	Huang Liang-chi	245	8
AUS	Benjamin Mitchell	259	9

- ^{1} Rankings are as of August 26, 2013.

=== Other entrants ===
The following players received wildcards into the singles main draw:

- (China) Bai Yan
- (China) Ouyang Bowen
- (Chinese Taipei) Wang Chieh-fu
- (China) Wang Chuhan

The following players received entry from the qualifying draw:

- (Japan) Toshihide Matsui
- (South Korea) Nam Ji-sung
- (Japan) Yasutaka Uchiyama
- (China) Zhang Zhizhen

The following players received entry as a lucky loser the singles main draw:

- (China) Wang Riukai

== Champions ==
=== Singles ===
- (Japan) Yūichi Sugita def. (Japan) Hiroki Moriya 6–3, 6–3

=== Doubles ===
- (Thailand) Sanchai Ratiwatana / (Thailand) Sonchat Ratiwatana def. (Chinese Taipei) Lee Hsin-han / (Chinese Taipei) Peng Hsien-yin 6–3, 6–4
