= 2016 Shanghai Challenger =

- Date: 5–12 September
- Edition: 6th
- Surface: Hard
- Location: Shanghai, China

Champions

Singles
- (Switzerland) Henri Laaksonen

Doubles
- (Chinese Taipei) Hsieh Cheng-peng / (Chinese Taipei) Yi Chu-huan
← 2015 ·	Shanghai Challenger	· 2017 →

The 2016 Shanghai Challenger was a professional tennis tournament played on hard courts. It was the sixth edition of the tournament which was part of the 2016 ATP Challenger Tour. It took place in Shanghai, China between 5 and 12 September 2016.

== Singles main-draw entrants ==
=== Seeds ===
Country	Player	Rank^{1}	Seed
AUS	Jordan Thompson	91	1
JPN	Tatsuma Ito	129	2
JPN	Go Soeda	147	3
SUI	Henri Laaksonen	161	4
ITA	Luca Vanni	164	5
TPE	Jason Jung	169	6
RUS	Alexander Kudryavtsev	170	7
CHN	Zhang Ze	174	8

- ^{1} Rankings are as of August 29, 2016.

=== Other entrants ===
The following players received wildcards into the singles main draw:

- (China) Zhang Zhizhen
- (China) Qiu Zhuoyang
- (China) Gao Xin
- (China) Sun Fajing

The following player received entry into the singles main draw with a protected ranking:

- (Slovenia) Blaž Kavčič

The following player entered the singles main draw as an alternate"

- (Slovakia) Norbert Gombos

The following players received entry from the qualifying draw:

- (Japan) Yasutaka Uchiyama
- (Croatia) Matija Pecotić
- (China) Xia Zihao
- (Japan) Shuichi Sekiguchi

== Champions ==
=== Singles ===
- (Switzerland) Henri Laaksonen def. (Chinese Taipei) Jason Jung 6–3, 6–3.

=== Doubles ===
- (Chinese Taipei) Hsieh Cheng-peng / (Chinese Taipei) Yi Chu-huan def. (China) Gao Xin / (China) Li Zhe 7–6^{(8–6)}, 5–7, [10–0]
