= 2025 Shanghai Challenger =

- Date: 1–7 September
- Edition: 12th
- Surface: Hard
- Location: Shanghai, China

Champions

Singles
- (Italy) Giulio Zeppieri

Doubles
- (Thailand) Pruchya Isaro / (India) Niki Kaliyanda Poonacha
← 2024 ·	Shanghai Challenger	· 2026 →

The 2025 Shanghai Challenger was a professional tennis tournament played on hardcourts. It was the 12th edition of the tournament which was part of the 2025 ATP Challenger Tour. It took place in Shanghai, China between 1 and 7 September 2025.

== Singles main-draw entrants ==
=== Seeds ===
Country	Player	Rank^{1}	Seed
GBR	Dan Evans	136	1
JPN	Yosuke Watanuki	148	2
JPN	Yoshihito Nishioka	149	3
AUS	Bernard Tomic	168	4
AUS	James McCabe	176	5
KAZ	Beibit Zhukayev	191	6
TPE	Hsu Yu-hsiou	194	7
JPN	Sho Shimabukuro	198	8

- ^{1} Rankings are as of 25 August 2025.

=== Other entrants ===
The following players received wildcards into the singles main draw:

- (China) Cui Jie
- (China) Te Rigele
- (China) Xiao Linang

The following player received entry into the singles main draw through the Next Gen Accelerator programme:

- (China) Zhou Yi

The following player received entry into the singles main draw as an alternate:

- (France) Arthur Géa

The following players received entry from the qualifying draw:

- (Chinese Taipei) Huang Tsung-hao
- (Japan) Kokoro Isomura
- (Poland) Filip Peliwo
- (Thailand) Kasidit Samrej
- (Japan) Renta Tokuda
- (China) Zeng Yaojie

The following player received entry as a lucky loser:

- Petr Bar Biryukov

== Champions ==
=== Singles ===
- (Italy) Giulio Zeppieri def. (Japan) Yasutaka Uchiyama 7–6^{(7–2)}, 7–5.

=== Doubles ===
- (Thailand) Pruchya Isaro / (India) Niki Kaliyanda Poonacha def. (Chinese Taipei) Jason Jung / (United States) Reese Stalder 6–4, 6–7^{(2–7)}, [10–8].
