= 2019 Shanghai Challenger – Doubles =

Doubles
- 2019 Shanghai Challenger

Final
- Champions: (China) Gao Xin (China) Sun Fajing
- Runners-up: (Australia) Marc Polmans (Australia) Scott Puodziunas
- Score: 2–6, 6–4, [10–7]

Events
Singles	Doubles
- Shanghai Challenger

Gong Maoxin and Zhang Ze were the defending champions but chose not to defend their title.

Gao Xin and Sun Fajing won the title after defeating Marc Polmans and Scott Puodziunas 2–6, 6–4, [10–7] in the final.

== Seeds ==
1. (Australia) Max Purcell / (Australia) Luke Saville (first round)
2. (India) Saketh Myneni / (India) Divij Sharan (semifinals)
3. (United States) Evan King / (United States) Hunter Reese (quarterfinals)
4. (Spain) Enrique López Pérez / (India) Jeevan Nedunchezhiyan (first round)

== Draw ==
Key

- Q = Qualifier
- WC = Wild card
- LL = Lucky loser
- Alt = Alternate
- ITF = ITF entry
- PR = Protected ranking
- SR = Special ranking
- SE = Special exempt
- JE = Junior exempt
- JR = Junior Accelerator Programme entrant
- CO = College Accelerator Programme entrant
- NG = Next Gen Accelerator Program entrant
- w/o = Walkover
- r = Retired
- d = Defaulted

First round
1	(Australia) M Purcell (Australia) L Saville	3	7^{7}	[6]
(Portugal) G Oliveira (Japan) Y Uchiyama	6	6^{5}	[10]
Alt	(United States) C Altamirano (Ukraine) V Orlov	1	2
(India) S Balaji (India) V Vardhan	6	6
4	(Spain) E López Pérez (India) J Nedunchezhiyan	6^{6}	4
(Thailand) Sa Ratiwatana (Thailand) So Ratiwatana	7^{8}	6
WC	(China) A Wang (China) Wu Hao	3	7^{7}	[8]
WC	(China) X Gao (China) F Sun	6	6^{5}	[10]
(Australia) M Polmans (Australia) S Puodziunas	6	6
(Japan) Shuichi Sekiguchi (Japan) Y Sugita	4	4
(India) A Kadhe (India) VS Prashanth	3	7	[6]
3	(United States) E King (United States) H Reese	6	5	[10]
(United States) JP Fruttero (Japan) T Matsui	6	6
(Australia) A Harris (Australia) A Santillan	4	4
(Canada) S Diez (Russia) T Gabashvili	5	4
2	(India) S Myneni (India) D Sharan	7	6

Quarterfinals
(Portugal) G Oliveira (Japan) Y Uchiyama	7^{7}	6
(India) S Balaji (India) V Vardhan	6^{1}	3
(Thailand) Sa Ratiwatana (Thailand) So Ratiwatana	6	4	[7]
WC	(China) X Gao (China) F Sun	4	6	[10]
(Australia) M Polmans (Australia) S Puodziunas	6^{6}	6	[10]
3	(United States) E King (United States) H Reese	7^{8}	3	[6]
(United States) JP Fruttero (Japan) T Matsui	6^{2}	3
2	(India) S Myneni (India) D Sharan	7^{7}	6

Semifinals
(Portugal) G Oliveira (Japan) Y Uchiyama	6^{5}	6	[7]
WC	(China) X Gao (China) F Sun	7^{7}	3	[10]
(Australia) M Polmans (Australia) S Puodziunas	6	3	[13]
2	(India) S Myneni (India) D Sharan	2	6	[11]

Final
WC	(China) X Gao (China) F Sun	2	6	[10]
(Australia) M Polmans (Australia) S Puodziunas	6	4	[7]
