= 2026 Shanghai Challenger =

- Date: 7–13 September
- Edition: 13th
- Surface: Hard
- Location: Shanghai, China

Champions

Singles
- Ilya Ivashka

Doubles
- (Australia) Jake Delaney / (Australia) Jesse Delaney
- Shanghai Challenger

The 2026 Shanghai Challenger was a professional tennis tournament played on hardcourts. It was the 13th edition of the tournament which was part of the 2026 ATP Challenger Tour. It took place in Shanghai, China between 7 and 13 September 2026.

== Singles main-draw entrants ==
=== Seeds ===
Country	Player	Rank^{1}	Seed
JPN	Rei Sakamoto	157	1
JPN	Taro Daniel	160	2
AUS	Bernard Tomic	179	3
CAN	Alexis Galarneau	183	4
SWE	Elias Ymer	204	5
JPN	Rio Noguchi	219	6
TPE	Tseng Chun-hsin	221	7
CHN	Zhou Yi	248	8

- ^{1} Rankings are as of 31 August 2026.

=== Other entrants ===
The following players received wildcards into the singles main draw:

- (China) Cui Jie
- (China) Te Rigele
- (China) Xiao Linang

The following player received entry into the singles main draw as an alternate:

- Semen Pankin

The following players received entry from the qualifying draw:

- (Italy) Alexander Binda
- (Switzerland) Luca Castelnuovo
- (Australia) Omar Jasika
- (Malaysia) Mitsuki Wei Kang Leong
- (South Korea) Nam Ji-sung
- (Kazakhstan) Denis Yevseyev

== Champions ==
=== Singles ===
- Ilya Ivashka def. Marat Sharipov 6–4, 3–6, 7–6^{(9–7)}.

=== Doubles ===
- (Australia) Jake Delaney / (Australia) Jesse Delaney def. Petr Bar Biryukov / (Italy) Alexander Binda 6–4, 7–6^{(7–2)}.
