= Hua Runhao =

Chinese tennis player

- Country (sports): China
- Born: 6 March 1996 (age 29) Shanghai, China
- Height: 6 ft 1 in (185 cm)
- Retired: 2022 (last match played)
- Plays: Right-handed (two-handed backhand)
- Prize money: $58,743

Singles
- Career record: 0–0 (at ATP Tour level, Grand Slam level, and in Davis Cup)
- Career titles: 0
- Highest ranking: No. 617 (27 May 2019)

Doubles
- Career record: 0–3 (at ATP Tour level, Grand Slam level, and in Davis Cup)
- Career titles: 0
- Highest ranking: No. 269 (9 September 2019)
- Last updated on: 23 May 2022.

Hua Runhao (Chinese: 华润豪; pinyin: Huà Rùnháo; Mandarin pronunciation: [xwâ ɻwə̂n xǎʊ]; born 6 March 1996) is a Chinese former tennis player.

Hua has a career high ATP singles ranking of 617 achieved on 27 May 2019. He also has a career high ATP doubles ranking of 269 achieved on 9 September 2019. He has reached 6 doubles finals, posting a record of 3 wins and 3 losses which includes 1 final on the ATP Challenger Tour. He has yet to reach a singles final at any senior level.

Hua made his ATP main draw debut when he was granted a wildcard entry at the 2018 China Open in the doubles draw partnering compatriot Zhang Zhizhen, where they would be defeated in the first round by Ivan Dodig and Nikola Mektic in straight sets.

== ATP Challenger and ITF Futures finals ==
=== Doubles: 9 (4–5) ===
Legend ATP Challenger (0–1) ITF Futures (4–4)	Finals by surface Hard (3–5) Clay (1–0) Grass (0–0) Carpet (0–0)

Result	W–L	Date	Tournament	Tier	Surface	Partner	Opponents	Score
Loss	0–1	Jul 2014	China F8, Shenzhen	Futures	Hard	(China) Qui Zhuoyang	(China) Bai Yan (China) Zhang Zhizhen	4–6, 6–4, [3–10]
Win	1–1	Jul 2018	China F11, Kunshan	Futures	Hard	(China) Zeng Shihong	(China) Zou Weibowen (China) Wu Hao	6–3, 6–3
Loss	1–2	Sep 2018	Shanghai, China	Challenger	Hard	(China) Zhang Zhizhen	(China) Gong Maoxin (China) Zhang Ze	4–6, 6–3, [4–10]
Win	2–2	Feb 2019	M15 Antalya, Turkey	World Tennis Tour	Clay	(Hong Kong) Wong Hong Kit	(Colombia) Cristian Rodriguez (Colombia) Felipe Mantilla	3–0 ret.
Loss	2–3	Jul 2019	M25 Kunshan, China	World Tennis Tour	Hard	(China) Zeng Hongshi	(China) Sun Fajing (China) Gao Xin	2–6, 6–7^{(5–7)}
Win	3–3	Jul 2019	M25 Qujing, China	World Tennis Tour	Hard	(China) Sun Fajing	(Philippines) Francis Casey Alcantara (New Zealand) Rhett Purcell	6–1, 6–1
Loss	3–4	May 2021	M15 Heraklion, Greece	World Tennis Tour	Hard	(China) Zhang Ze	(Cyprus) Petros Chrysochos (United Kingdom) Mark Whitehouse	6–4, 2–6; [6–10]
Loss	3–5	Jun 2021	M15 Heraklion, Greece	World Tennis Tour	Hard	(China) Zhang Ze	(Japan) Yuki Mochizuki (Japan) Takuto Niki	3–6, 4–6
Win	4–5	Jun 2021	M15 Heraklion, Greece	World Tennis Tour	Hard	(China) Zhang Ze	(Japan) Makoto Ochi (Ukraine) Volodymyr Uzhylovskyi	6–2, 6–7^{(6–8)}, [10–7]
