= Wu Di (tennis) =

Chinese tennis player

Wu Di 吴迪
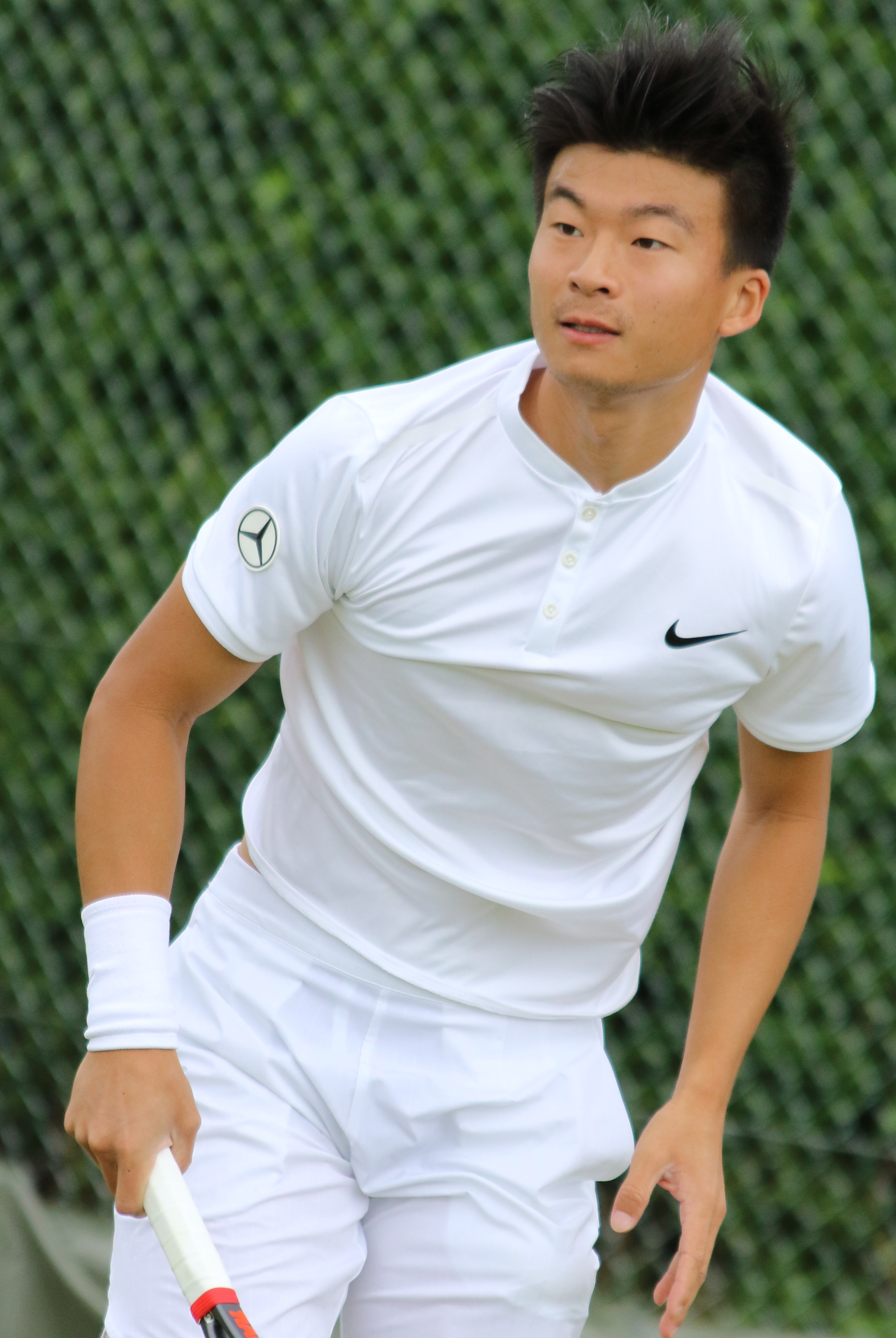
- Country (sports): China
- Residence: Shanghai, China
- Born: 14 September 1991 (age 35) Wuhan, Hubei, China
- Height: 1.75 m (5 ft 9 in)
- Turned pro: 2007
- Retired: 2020 (last match played)
- Plays: Right-handed (two-handed backhand)
- Coach: Cao Xiao Yin, Davide Sanguinetti, Abhimanyu Singh
- Prize money: US$ 840,244

Singles
- Career record: 21–33 (at ATP and Grand Slam-level, and in Davis Cup)
- Career titles: 0
- Highest ranking: No. 140 (25 April 2016)

Grand Slam singles results
- Australian Open: 1R (2013, 2014, 2016)
- French Open: Q2 (2013)
- Wimbledon: Q1 (2016, 2017)
- US Open: Q3 (2014)

Doubles
- Career record: 3–12 (at ATP and Grand Slam-level, and in Davis Cup)
- Career titles: 0
- Highest ranking: No. 186 (2 April 2018)

Team competitions
- Davis Cup: 18–11
- Hopman Cup: RR (2012)
Medal record
Representing China
Men's tennis
Asian Games
Silver medal – second place	2014 Incheon	Team Event
- Last updated on: 11 September 2021.

Wu Di (Chinese: 吴迪; pinyin: Wú Dí; Mandarin pronunciation: [ǔ tǐ]; born 14 September 1991) is a Chinese former professional tennis player.

== Professional career ==
Wu has a career high singles ranking of world No. 140 achieved on 25 April 2016, and a career high doubles ranking of world No. 186 achieved on 2 April 2018. He has reached 24 singles finals on the ATP Challenger Tour and ITF Futures Tour, posting a record of 13–11, which includes a 1–4 record in ATP Challenger finals. Additionally, he has reached 15 doubles finals posting a record of 6–9, which includes a 3–4 record in ATP Challenger finals.

Wu participated in the 2012 Hopman Cup together with the country's best female player Li Na. Wu had the chance to try out in a much bigger stage but he could not manage to win a match, as he and team China were eliminated in the round robin stage of the tournament.

In the Asia-Pacific Australian Open Wildcard Play-off men's final, Wu defeated Thai Danai Udomchoke to obtain his wildcard to compete in the 2013 Australian Open main draw. On his way to the final, Wu beat top seed Yuichi Sugita of Japan and No. 4 seed and compatriot Ze Zhang. In the main draw, Wu lost to Ivan Dodig in four sets.

In late 2013, he once again qualified for the 2014 Australian Open by winning the Asia-Pacific Australian Open Wildcard Plays-off men's final, on the route to the main draw, Wu defeated countryman Zhe Li, Yuki Bhambri of India and compatriot Ze Zhang. However, he lost to Kenny de Schepper in the first round of the main draw.

Wu Di earned his biggest win in his career by upsetting Denis Istomin in four sets in the Asia Pacific Davis Cup singles rubber.

== ATP Challenger and ITF Futures finals ==
=== Singles: 24 (13–11) ===
Legend ATP Challenger (1–4) ITF Futures (12–7)	Finals by surface Hard (13–11) Clay (0–0) Grass (0–0) Carpet (0–0)

Result	W–L	Date	Tournament	Tier	Surface	Opponent	Score
Win	1–0	Apr 2010	China F3, Chongqing	Futures	Hard	(Croatia) Marin Bradaric	7–5 ret.
Win	2–0	Jun 2010	China F6, Jiaxing	Futures	Hard	(China) Gong Maoxin	7–5, 5–7, 6–4
Win	3–0	Jan 2011	China F1, Mengzi City	Futures	Hard	(United Kingdom) Joshua Milton	2–6, 7–5, 6–3
Loss	3–1	Jun 2011	Korea F3, Gimcheon	Futures	Hard	(South Korea) Im Kyu-Tae	2–6, 2–6
Loss	3–2	Apr 2012	China F5, Chengdu	Futures	Hard	(China) Zhang Ze	6–7^{(3–7)}, 3–6
Win	4–2	Apr 2012	China F6, Chengdu	Futures	Hard	(China) Zhang Ze	6–1, 7–6^{(8–6)}
Win	5–2	May 2012	China F8, Fuzhou	Futures	Hard	(Chinese Taipei) Chen Ti	6–1, 6–2
Win	6–2	Jun 2012	Korea F3, Gimcheon	Futures	Hard	(United States) Michael McClune	6–1, 6–1
Loss	6–3	Jun 2012	China F9, Shenyang	Futures	Hard	(China) Li Zhe	6–1, 6–7^{(3–7)}, 3–6
Loss	6–4	Jul 2012	China F10, Shenyang	Futures	Hard	(China) Gong Maoxin	4–6, 3–6
Loss	6–5	Aug 2012	Beijing, China	Challenger	Hard	(Slovenia) Grega Žemlja	3–6, 0–6
Win	7–5	Apr 2013	China F1, Chengdu	Futures	Hard	(Netherlands) Boy Westerhof	7–5, 2–6, 6–4
Win	8–5	Apr 2013	China F2, Chengdu	Futures	Hard	(Australia) Nick Kyrgios	6–3, 6–3
Win	9–5	Mar 2014	Japan F1, Nishitama	Futures	Hard	(Japan) Takuto Niki	6–2, 6–4
Win	10–5	Apr 2014	China F4, Chengdu	Futures	Hard	(Croatia) Borna Ćorić	6–4, 6–2
Win	11–5	May 2015	China F5, Wuhan	Futures	Hard	(China) Li Zhe	3–6, 6–4, 7–6^{(7–3)}
Loss	11–6	Jun 2015	China F7, Wuhan	Futures	Hard	(Chinese Taipei) Huang Liang-Chi	6–3, 3–6, 4–6
Win	12–6	Jun 2015	China F8, Zhangjiagang	Futures	Hard	(China) Li Zhe	6–3, 6–7^{(2–7)}, 6–3
Loss	12–7	Aug 2015	China F13, Putian	Futures	Hard	(South Korea) Duckhee Lee	2–6, 3–6
Loss	12–8	Sep 2015	Shanghai, China	Challenger	Hard	(India) Yuki Bhambri	6–3, 0–6, 6–7^{(3–7)}
Win	13–8	Jan 2016	Maui, United States	Challenger	Hard	(United Kingdom) Kyle Edmund	4–6, 6–3, 6–4
Loss	13–9	Mar 2016	Shenzhen, China	Challenger	Hard	(Israel) Dudi Sela	4–6, 3–6
Loss	13–10	Jun 2018	China F7, Luzhou	Futures	Hard	(China) Li Zhe	6–2, 2–6, 2–6
Loss	13–11	Sep 2019	Shanghai, China	Challenger	Hard	(Japan) Yasutaka Uchiyama	4–6, 6–7^{(4–7)}

=== Doubles: 15 (6–9) ===
Legend ATP Challenger (3–4) ITF Futures (3–5)	Finals by surface Hard (5–9) Clay (1–0) Grass (0–0) Carpet (0–0)

Result	W–L	Date	Tournament	Tier	Surface	Partner	Opponents	Score
Win	1–0	May 2009	China F4, Wuhan	Futures	Hard	(China) Bai Yan	(China) Feng Xue (China) Zeng Shaoxuan	6–2, 6–1
Loss	1–1	Jan 2010	Israel F1, Eilat	Futures	Hard	(China) Zhang Ze	(Slovakia) Andrej Martin (Slovakia) Miloslav Mečíř	2–6, 3–6
Loss	1–2	Feb 2010	Azerbaijan F2, Baku	Futures	Hard	(China) Zhang Ze	(Netherlands) Matwe Middelkoop (Netherlands) Antal Van Der Duim	6–7^{(8–10)}, 5–7
Win	2–2	Apr 2010	China F3, Chongqing	Futures	Hard	(China) Zhang Ze	(China) Gong Maoxin (China) Li Zhe	6–3, 1–6, [10–8]
Loss	2–3	Aug 2010	Astana, Kazakhstan	Challenger	Hard	(China) Zhang Ze	(Russia) Michail Elgin (Austria) Nikolaus Moser	0–6, 4–6
Loss	2–4	Mar 2012	USA F6, Harlingen	Futures	Hard	(Italy) Thomas Fabbiano	(United States) Tennys Sandgren (United States) Rhyne Williams	7–6^{(8–6)}, 5–7, [6–10]
Loss	2–5	Apr 2012	China F6, Chengdu	Futures	Hard	(China) Chang Yu	(China) Gao Xin (China) Li Zhe	2–2 ret.
Loss	2–6	Jun 2012	China F9, Shenyang	Futures	Hard	(China) Gao Peng	(Chinese Taipei) Huang Liang-Chi (Chinese Taipei) Yi Chu-Huan	6–7^{(1–7)}, 5–7
Win	3–6	Mar 2014	China F3, Yuxi	Futures	Hard	(China) Li Zhe	(South Korea) Lim Yong-kyu (South Korea) Nam Ji-sung	6–4, 6–4
Win	4–6	May 2015	Anning, China	Challenger	Clay	(China) Bai Yan	(India) Karunuday Singh (Australia) Andrew Whittington	6–3, 6–4
Win	5–6	Sep 2015	Shanghai, China	Challenger	Hard	(Chinese Taipei) Yi Chu-huan	(Italy) Thomas Fabbiano (Italy) Luca Vanni	6–3, 7–5
Loss	5–7	Mar 2016	Zhuhai, China	Challenger	Hard	(Chinese Taipei) Hsieh Cheng-peng	(China) Gong Maoxin (Chinese Taipei) Yi Chu-huan	6–2, 1–6, [5–10]
Win	6–7	Sep 2016	Nanchang, China	Challenger	Hard	(China) Zhang Zhizhen	(Colombia) Nicolás Barrientos (Philippines) Ruben Gonzales	7–6^{(7–4)}, 6–3
Loss	6–8	Jan 2017	Bangkok, Thailand	Challenger	Hard	(Japan) Yūichi Sugita	(France) Grégoire Barrère (France) Jonathan Eysseric	3–6, 2–6
Loss	6–9	Mar 2018	Qujing, China	Challenger	Hard	(China) Zhang Ze	(Belarus) Aliaksandr Bury (Chinese Taipei) Peng Hsien-yin	7–6^{(7–3)}, 4–6, [10–12]

== Performance timeline ==
Key
W	F	SF	QF	#R	RR	Q#	DNQ	A	NH

(W) winner; (F) finalist; (SF) semifinalist; (QF) quarterfinalist; (#R) rounds 4, 3, 2, 1; (RR) round-robin stage; (Q#) qualification round; (DNQ) did not qualify; (A) absent; (NH) not held; (SR) strike rate (events won / competed); (W–L) win–loss record.
To avoid confusion and double counting, these charts are updated at the conclusion of a tournament or when the player's participation has ended.

=== Singles ===
Tournament	2013	2014	2015	2016	2017	2018	2019	2020	SR	W–L	Win %
Grand Slam tournaments
Australian Open	1R	1R	A	1R	Q3	Q2	A	A	0 / 3	0–3	0%
French Open	Q2	Q1	A	Q1	Q1	A	A	A	0 / 0	0–0	–
Wimbledon	A	A	A	Q1	Q1	A	A	NH	0 / 0	0–0	–
US Open	Q2	Q3	A	Q2	Q1	A	A	A	0 / 0	0–0	–
Win–loss	0–1	0–1	0–0	0–1	0–0	0–0	0–0	0–0	0 / 3	0–0	0%
ATP World Tour Masters 1000
Shanghai Masters	1R	1R	1R	2R	2R	Q1	Q1	NH	0 / 7		29%
Win–loss	0–1	0–1	0–1	1–1	1–1	0–0	0–0	0–0	0 / 7	2–5	29%
