= Shanghai Challenger =

- 2025 Shanghai Challenger

Tournament information
- Location: Shanghai, China
- Category: ATP Challenger Tour 100
- Surface: Hard / Outdoors
- Draw: 32S/32Q/16D
- Prize money: $133,250 (2024), €50,000

The Shanghai Challenger, also known as the Road to the Rolex Shanghai Masters, is a tennis tournament held in Shanghai, China since 2011. The event is part of the ATP Challenger Tour and is played on outdoor hardcourts.

== Past finals ==
=== Men's singles ===
Year	Champion	Runner-up	Score
2026	Ilya Ivashka	Marat Sharipov	6–4, 3–6, 7–6^{(9–7)}
2025	(Italy) Giulio Zeppieri	(Japan) Yasutaka Uchiyama	7–6^{(7–2)}, 7–5
2024	(Japan) Sho Shimabukuro	(Chinese Taipei) Hsu Yu-hsiou	6–4, 6–4
2023	(Australia) Christopher O'Connell	(Japan) Yosuke Watanuki	6–3, 7–5
2020–22	Not held		
2019	(Japan) Yasutaka Uchiyama	(China) Wu Di	6–4, 7–6^{(7–4)}
2018	(Slovenia) Blaž Kavčič	(Japan) Hiroki Moriya	6–1, 7–6^{(7–1)}
2017	(China) Wu Yibing	(Chinese Taipei) Lu Yen-hsun	7–6^{(8–6)}, 0–0 ret.
2016	(Switzerland) Henri Laaksonen	(Chinese Taipei) Jason Jung	6–3, 6–3
2015	(India) Yuki Bhambri	(China) Wu Di	3–6, 6–0, 7–6^{(7–3)}
2014	(Japan) Yoshihito Nishioka	(India) Somdev Devvarman	6–4, 6–7^{(5–7)}, 7–6^{(7–3)}
2013	(Japan) Yūichi Sugita	(Japan) Hiroki Moriya	6–3, 6–3
2012	(Chinese Taipei) Lu Yen-hsun	(Germany) Peter Gojowczyk	7–5, 6–0
2011	(Germany) Cedrik-Marcel Stebe	(Russia) Alexandre Kudryavtsev	6–4, 4–6, 7–5

=== Men's doubles ===
Year	Champions	Runners-up	Score
2026	(Australia) Jake Delaney (Australia) Jesse Delaney	Petr Bar Biryukov (Italy) Alexander Binda	6–4, 7–6^{(7–2)}
2025	(Thailand) Pruchya Isaro (India) Niki Kaliyanda Poonacha	(Chinese Taipei) Jason Jung (United States) Reese Stalder	6–4, 6–7^{(2–7)}, [10–8]
2024	(Colombia) Cristian Rodríguez (Australia) Matthew Romios	(India) Rithvik Choudary Bollipalli (India) Arjun Kadhe	7–6^{(7–4)}, 1–6, [10–7]
2023	(Australia) Alex Bolt (Australia) Luke Saville	(China) Bu Yunchaokete (China) Te Rigele	4–6, 6–3, [11–9]
2020–22	Not held		
2019	(China) Gao Xin (China) Sun Fajing	(Australia) Marc Polmans (Australia) Scott Puodziunas	2–6, 6–4, [10–7]
2018	(China) Gong Maoxin (China) Zhang Ze	(China) Hua Runhao (China) Zhang Zhizhen	6–4, 3–6, [10–4]
2017	(Japan) Toshihide Matsui (Chinese Taipei) Yi Chu-huan	(United States) Bradley Klahn (Canada) Peter Polansky	6–7^{(1–7)}, 6–4, [10–5]
2016	(Chinese Taipei) Hsieh Cheng-peng (Chinese Taipei) Yi Chu-huan	(China) Gao Xin (China) Li Zhe	7–6^{(8–6)}, 5–7, [10–0]
2015	(China) Wu Di (Chinese Taipei) Yi Chu-huan	(Italy) Thomas Fabbiano (Italy) Luca Vanni	6–3, 7–5
2014	(India) Yuki Bhambri (India) Divij Sharan	(India) Somdev Devvarman (India) Sanam Singh	7–6^{(7–2)}, 6–7^{(4–7)}, [10–8]
2013	(Thailand) Sanchai Ratiwatana (Thailand) Sonchat Ratiwatana	(Chinese Taipei) Lee Hsin-han (Chinese Taipei) Peng Hsien-yin	6–3, 6–4
2012	(Thailand) Sanchai Ratiwatana (Thailand) Sonchat Ratiwatana	(India) Yuki Bhambri (India) Divij Sharan	6–4, 6–4
2011	(Thailand) Sanchai Ratiwatana (Thailand) Sonchat Ratiwatana	(South Africa) Fritz Wolmarans (United States) Michael Yani	7–6^{(7–4)}, 6–3
