= 2026 ATP Tour =

Men's tennis circuit

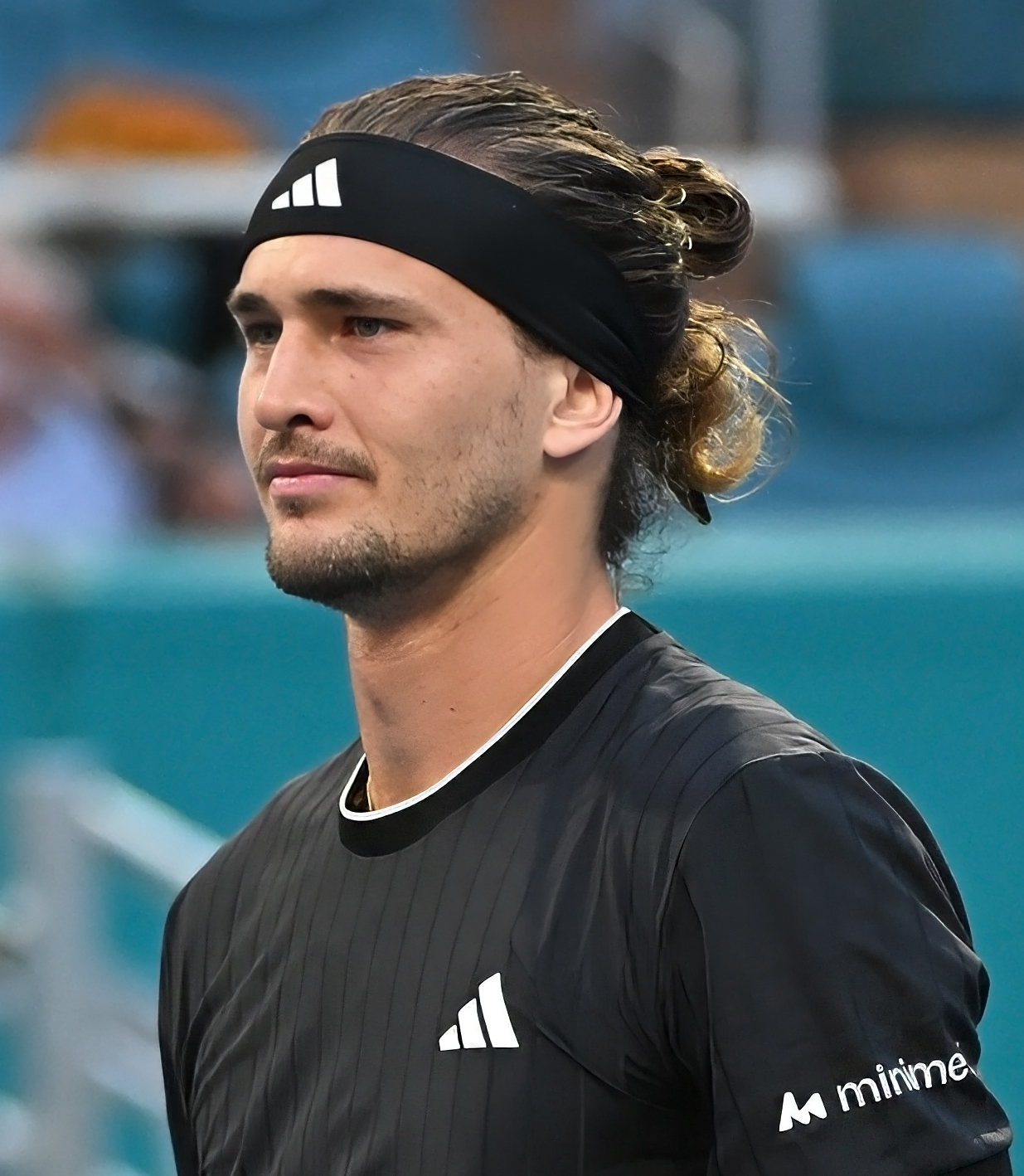
- Alexander Zverev finished the year as world No. 1 for the first time in his career. He won two singles tournaments during the season, comprising two majors at the French Open and US Open. He also finished runner-up at another major, the Wimbledon Championships.

Details
- Duration: 2 January – 20 December 2026
- Edition: 57th
- Tournaments: 65
- Categories: Grand Slam (4); ATP Finals; Next Gen ATP Finals; ATP 1000 (9); ATP 500 (16); ATP 250 (29); Laver Cup; Davis Cup; United Cup

Achievements (singles)
- Most titles: (Spain) Carlos Alcaraz; (Italy) Jannik Sinner; (6)
- Most finals: (Spain) Carlos Alcaraz (7)
- Prize money leader: (Germany) Alexander Zverev ($15,401,939)
- Points leader: (Germany) Alexander Zverev (9,350)

The 2026 ATP Tour is the global elite men's professional tennis circuit organized by the Association of Tennis Professionals (ATP) for the 2026 tennis season. The 2026 ATP Tour calendar comprises the Grand Slam tournaments, supervised by World Tennis, the ATP Finals, the ATP Tour Masters 1000, the ATP 500, the ATP 250, and the United Cup (organized with the WTA). Also included in the 2026 calendar are the Davis Cup (organized by World Tennis), Next Gen ATP Finals, and Laver Cup, none of which distribute ranking points.

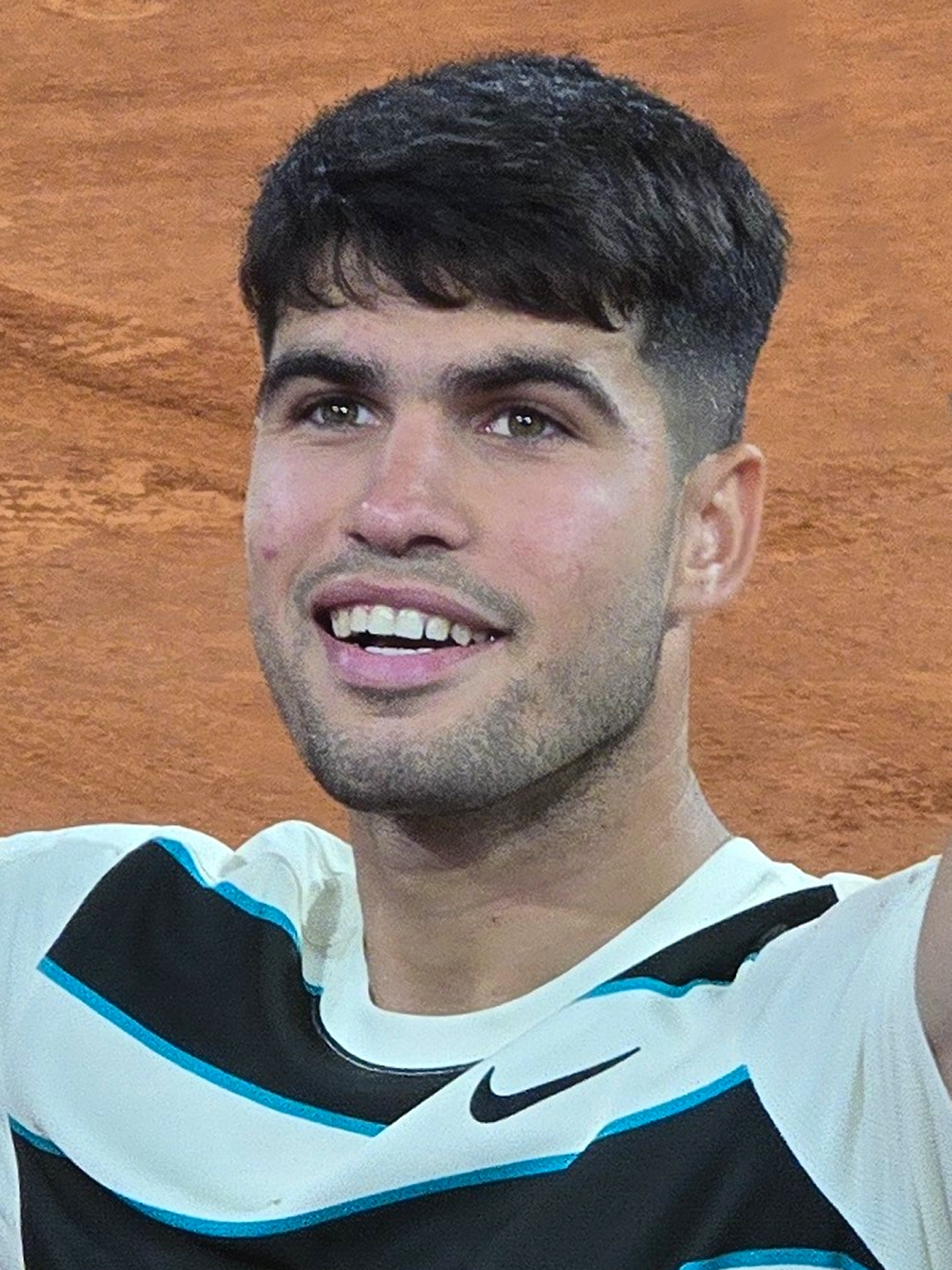
Carlos Alcaraz won his seventh major title, defeating Novak Djokovic in the Australian Open final.

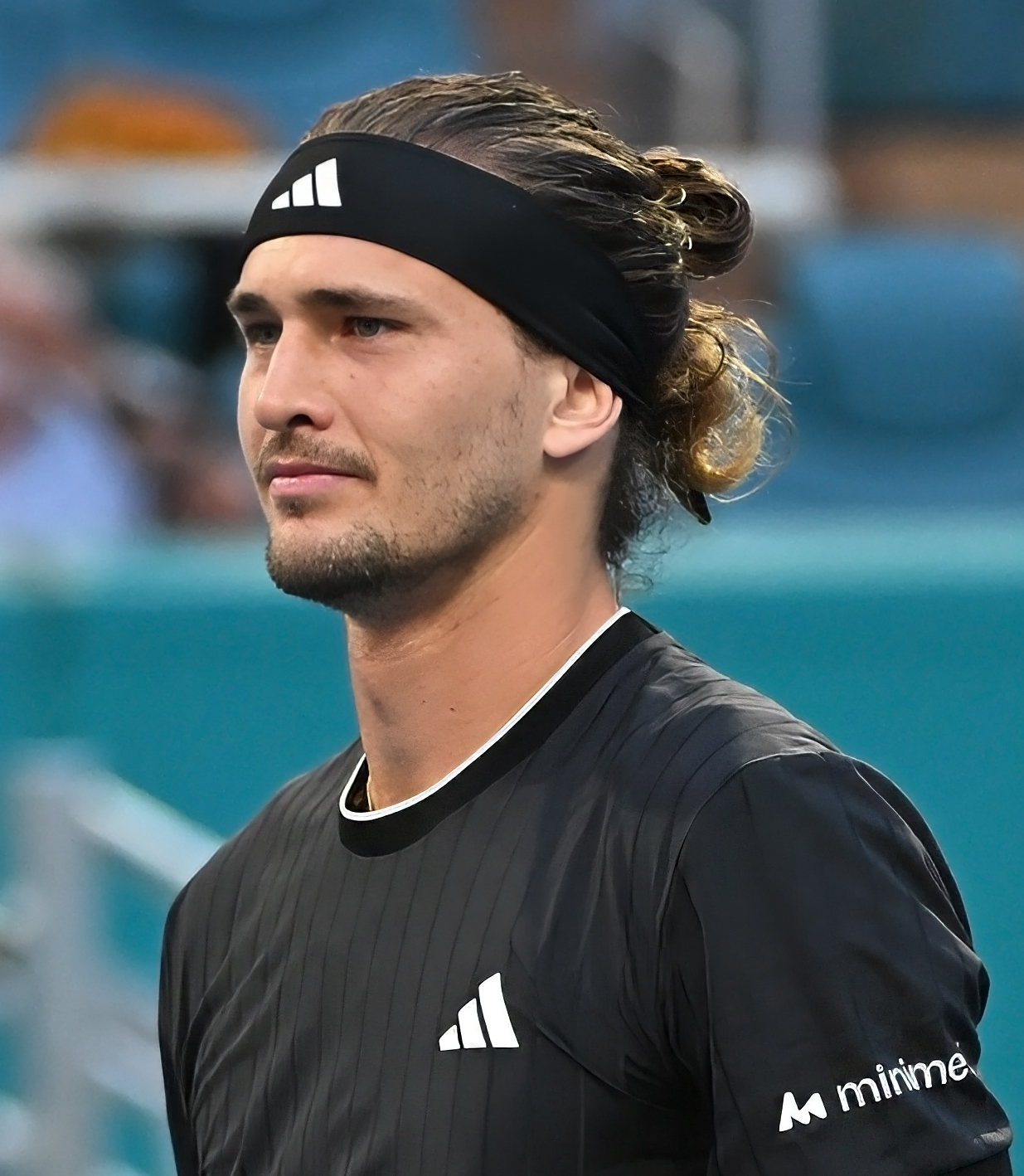
Alexander Zverev won his first and second major titles, defeating Flavio Cobolli in the French Open final and Ben Shelton in the US Open final.

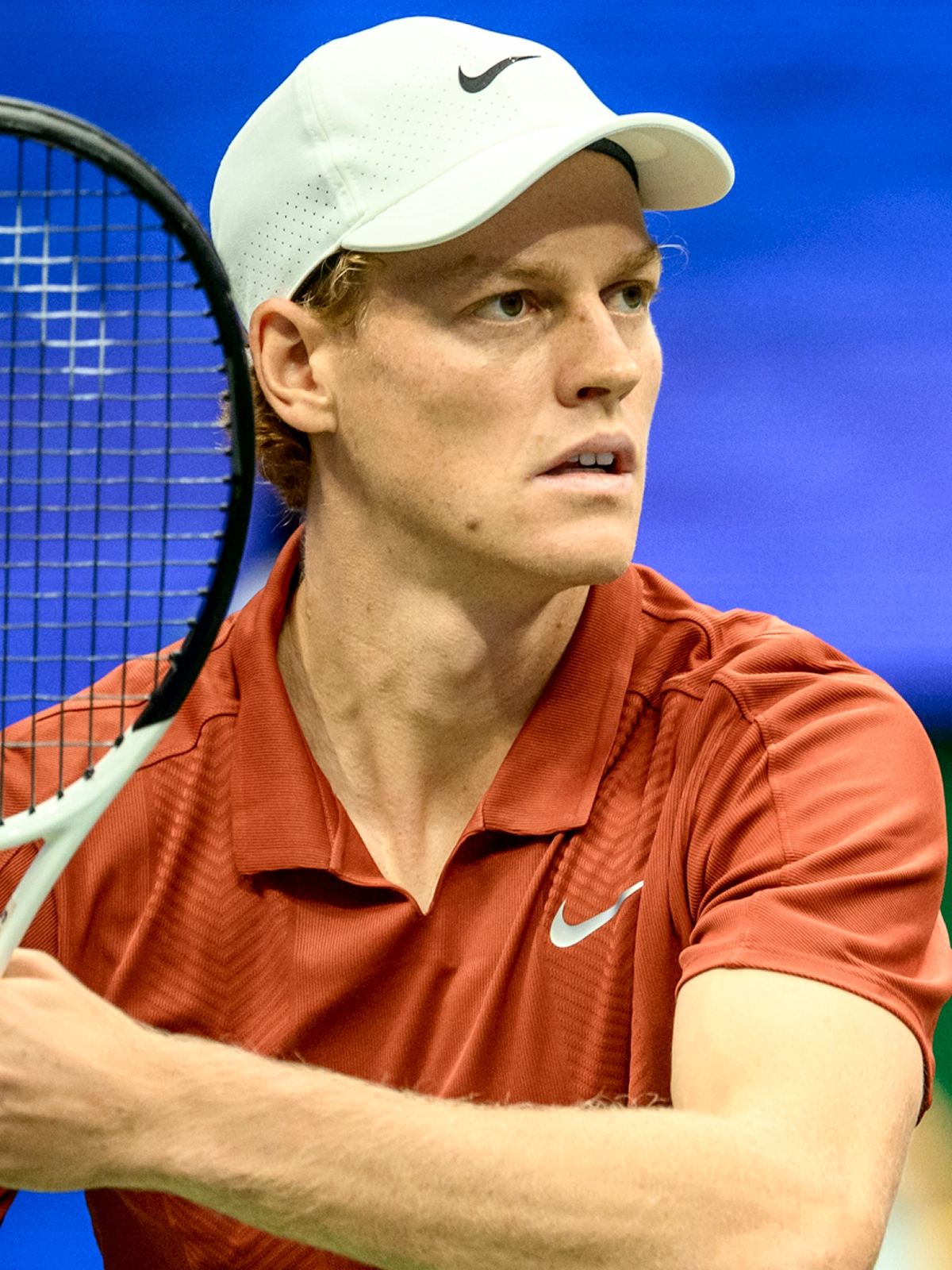
Jannik Sinner won his fifth major title, defeating Zverev in the Wimbledon final.

== Schedule ==
This is the schedule of events on the 2026 calendar.

Key
Grand Slam
ATP Finals
ATP 1000
ATP 500
ATP 250
Team events

=== January ===
Week	Tournament	Champions	Runners-up	Semifinalists	Quarterfinalists
5 Jan	United Cup; Perth/Sydney, Australia; United Cup; Hard – $5,903,345 – 18 teams	Poland; 2–1	Switzerland	United States; Belgium	Greece; Australia; Argentina; Czech Republic
5 Jan	Hong Kong Open; Hong Kong SAR; ATP 250; Hard – $700,045 – 28S/16Q/16D; Singles – Doubles	(Kazakhstan) Alexander Bublik; 7–6^{(7–2)}, 6–3	(Italy) Lorenzo Musetti	Andrey Rublev (United States) Marcos Giron	(Hong Kong) Coleman Wong (Portugal) Nuno Borges (United States) Michael Mmoh (China) Shang Juncheng
5 Jan	Hong Kong Open; Hong Kong SAR; ATP 250; Hard – $700,045 – 28S/16Q/16D; Singles – Doubles	(Italy) Lorenzo Musetti (Italy) Lorenzo Sonego; 6–4, 2–6, [10–1]	Karen Khachanov; Andrey Rublev	Andrey Rublev (United States) Marcos Giron	(Hong Kong) Coleman Wong (Portugal) Nuno Borges (United States) Michael Mmoh (China) Shang Juncheng
5 Jan	Brisbane International; Brisbane, Australia; ATP 250; Hard – $800,045 – 32S/24Q/24D; Singles – Doubles	Daniil Medvedev; 6–2, 7–6^{(7–1)}	(United States) Brandon Nakashima	(United States) Alex Michelsen (United States) Aleksandar Kovacevic	(Poland) Kamil Majchrzak (United States) Sebastian Korda (France) Giovanni Mpetshi Perricard (Belgium) Raphaël Collignon
5 Jan	Brisbane International; Brisbane, Australia; ATP 250; Hard – $800,045 – 32S/24Q/24D; Singles – Doubles	(Portugal) Francisco Cabral (Austria) Lucas Miedler; 6–3, 3–6, [10–8]	(United Kingdom) Julian Cash (United Kingdom) Lloyd Glasspool	(United States) Alex Michelsen (United States) Aleksandar Kovacevic	(Poland) Kamil Majchrzak (United States) Sebastian Korda (France) Giovanni Mpetshi Perricard (Belgium) Raphaël Collignon
12 Jan	Adelaide International; Adelaide, Australia; ATP 250; Hard – $700,045 – 28S/16Q/24D; Singles – Doubles	(Czech Republic) Tomáš Macháč; 6–4, 6–7^{(2–7)}, 6–2	(France) Ugo Humbert	(Spain) Alejandro Davidovich Fokina (United States) Tommy Paul	(Monaco) Valentin Vacherot (Kazakhstan) Alexander Shevchenko (Spain) Jaume Munar (Australia) Aleksandar Vukic
12 Jan	Adelaide International; Adelaide, Australia; ATP 250; Hard – $700,045 – 28S/16Q/24D; Singles – Doubles	(Finland) Harri Heliövaara (United Kingdom) Henry Patten; 6–3, 6–2	(Germany) Kevin Krawietz (Germany) Tim Pütz	(Spain) Alejandro Davidovich Fokina (United States) Tommy Paul	(Monaco) Valentin Vacherot (Kazakhstan) Alexander Shevchenko (Spain) Jaume Munar (Australia) Aleksandar Vukic
12 Jan	Auckland Open; Auckland, New Zealand; ATP 250; Hard – $700,045 – 28S/16Q/16D; Singles – Doubles	(Czech Republic) Jakub Menšík; 6–3, 7–6^{(9–7)}	(Argentina) Sebastián Báez	(United States) Marcos Giron (Hungary) Fábián Marozsán	(United States) Ben Shelton (Italy) Luciano Darderi (France) Giovanni Mpetshi Perricard (United States) Eliot Spizzirri
12 Jan	Auckland Open; Auckland, New Zealand; ATP 250; Hard – $700,045 – 28S/16Q/16D; Singles – Doubles	(France) Théo Arribagé (France) Albano Olivetti; 7–6^{(7–2)}, 6–4	(Austria) Alexander Erler (United States) Robert Galloway	(United States) Marcos Giron (Hungary) Fábián Marozsán	(United States) Ben Shelton (Italy) Luciano Darderi (France) Giovanni Mpetshi Perricard (United States) Eliot Spizzirri
19 Jan; 26 Jan	Australian Open; Melbourne, Australia; Grand Slam; Hard – A$49,171,000 – 128S/128Q/64D/32X; Singles – Doubles – Mixed doubles	(Spain) Carlos Alcaraz; 2–6, 6–2, 6–3, 7–5	(Serbia) Novak Djokovic	(Germany) Alexander Zverev (Italy) Jannik Sinner	(Australia) Alex de Minaur (United States) Learner Tien (Italy) Lorenzo Musetti (United States) Ben Shelton
19 Jan; 26 Jan	Australian Open; Melbourne, Australia; Grand Slam; Hard – A$49,171,000 – 128S/128Q/64D/32X; Singles – Doubles – Mixed doubles	(United States) Christian Harrison (United Kingdom) Neal Skupski; 7–6^{(7–4)}, 6–4	(Australia) Jason Kubler (Australia) Marc Polmans	(Germany) Alexander Zverev (Italy) Jannik Sinner	(Australia) Alex de Minaur (United States) Learner Tien (Italy) Lorenzo Musetti (United States) Ben Shelton
19 Jan; 26 Jan	Australian Open; Melbourne, Australia; Grand Slam; Hard – A$49,171,000 – 128S/128Q/64D/32X; Singles – Doubles – Mixed doubles	(Australia) Olivia Gadecki (Australia) John Peers; 4–6, 6–3, [10–8]	(France) Kristina Mladenovic (France) Manuel Guinard	(Germany) Alexander Zverev (Italy) Jannik Sinner	(Australia) Alex de Minaur (United States) Learner Tien (Italy) Lorenzo Musetti (United States) Ben Shelton

=== February ===
Week	Tournament	Champions	Runners-up	Semifinalists	Quarterfinalists
2 Feb	Davis Cup Qualifiers first round Düsseldorf, Germany – hard (i); Quito, Ecuador – clay Plovdiv, Bulgaria – clay Bengaluru, India – hard Tatabánya, Hungary – clay (i); Le Portel, France – hard (i); Vancouver, Canada – hard (i); Jihlava, Czech Republic – hard (i); Busan, South Korea – hard (i); Tokyo, Japan – hard (i); Oslo, Norway – hard (i); Varaždin, Croatia – hard (i); Santiago, Chile – clay	Qualifying round winners Germany 4–0; Ecuador 3–1; Belgium 4–0; India 3–2; United States 4–0; France 3–1; Canada 3–2; Czech Republic 3–1; South Korea 3–2; Austria 3–2; Great Britain 4–0; Croatia 3–1; Chile 4–0	Qualifying round losers Peru; Australia; Bulgaria; Netherlands; Hungary; Slovakia; Brazil; Sweden; Argentina; Japan; Norway; Denmark; Serbia		
2 Feb	Open Occitanie; Montpellier, France; ATP 250; Hard (i) – €612,620 – 28S/16Q/16D; Singles – Doubles	(Canada) Félix Auger-Aliassime; 6–3, 7–6^{(7–4)}	(France) Adrian Mannarino	(France) Titouan Droguet (United States) Martin Damm	(France) Arthur Fils (Netherlands) Tallon Griekspoor (France) Arthur Géa (Italy) Luca Nardi
2 Feb	Open Occitanie; Montpellier, France; ATP 250; Hard (i) – €612,620 – 28S/16Q/16D; Singles – Doubles	(France) Théo Arribagé (France) Albano Olivetti; 7–6^{(8–6)}, 6–1	(Germany) Constantin Frantzen (Netherlands) Robin Haase	(France) Titouan Droguet (United States) Martin Damm	(France) Arthur Fils (Netherlands) Tallon Griekspoor (France) Arthur Géa (Italy) Luca Nardi
9 Feb	Dallas Open; Dallas, United States; ATP 500; Hard (i) – $2,833,335 – 32S/16Q/16D; Singles – Doubles	(United States) Ben Shelton; 3–6, 6–3, 7–5	(United States) Taylor Fritz	(Croatia) Marin Čilić (Canada) Denis Shapovalov	(United States) Sebastian Korda (United Kingdom) Jack Pinnington Jones (Spain) Alejandro Davidovich Fokina (Serbia) Miomir Kecmanović
9 Feb	Dallas Open; Dallas, United States; ATP 500; Hard (i) – $2,833,335 – 32S/16Q/16D; Singles – Doubles	(France) Théo Arribagé (France) Albano Olivetti; 6–3, 7–6^{(7–4)}	(Spain) Marcel Granollers (Argentina) Horacio Zeballos	(Croatia) Marin Čilić (Canada) Denis Shapovalov	(United States) Sebastian Korda (United Kingdom) Jack Pinnington Jones (Spain) Alejandro Davidovich Fokina (Serbia) Miomir Kecmanović
9 Feb	Rotterdam Open; Rotterdam, Netherlands; ATP 500; Hard (i) – €2,462,660 – 32S/16Q/16D; Singles – Doubles	(Australia) Alex de Minaur; 6–3, 6–2	(Canada) Félix Auger-Aliassime	(France) Ugo Humbert (Kazakhstan) Alexander Bublik	(Netherlands) Botic van de Zandschulp (Australia) Christopher O'Connell (Spain) Jaume Munar (Netherlands) Tallon Griekspoor
9 Feb	Rotterdam Open; Rotterdam, Netherlands; ATP 500; Hard (i) – €2,462,660 – 32S/16Q/16D; Singles – Doubles	(Italy) Simone Bolelli (Italy) Andrea Vavassori; 6–3, 6–4	(Chinese Taipei) Ray Ho (Germany) Hendrik Jebens	(France) Ugo Humbert (Kazakhstan) Alexander Bublik	(Netherlands) Botic van de Zandschulp (Australia) Christopher O'Connell (Spain) Jaume Munar (Netherlands) Tallon Griekspoor
9 Feb	Argentina Open; Buenos Aires, Argentina; ATP 250; Clay (red) – $675,310 –28S/16Q/16D; Singles – Doubles	(Argentina) Francisco Cerúndolo; 6–4, 6–2	(Italy) Luciano Darderi	(Argentina) Tomás Martín Etcheverry (Argentina) Sebastián Báez	(Czech Republic) Vít Kopřiva (Chile) Alejandro Tabilo (Argentina) Camilo Ugo Carabelli (Spain) Pedro Martínez
9 Feb	Argentina Open; Buenos Aires, Argentina; ATP 250; Clay (red) – $675,310 –28S/16Q/16D; Singles – Doubles	(Brazil) Orlando Luz (Brazil) Rafael Matos; 7–5, 6–3	(Argentina) Andrea Collarini (Argentina) Nicolás Kicker	(Argentina) Tomás Martín Etcheverry (Argentina) Sebastián Báez	(Czech Republic) Vít Kopřiva (Chile) Alejandro Tabilo (Argentina) Camilo Ugo Carabelli (Spain) Pedro Martínez
16 Feb	Qatar Open; Doha, Qatar; ATP 500; Hard – $2,833,335 –32S/16Q/16D; Singles – Doubles	(Spain) Carlos Alcaraz; 6–2, 6–1	(France) Arthur Fils	Andrey Rublev (Czech Republic) Jakub Menšík	Karen Khachanov (Greece) Stefanos Tsitsipas (Czech Republic) Jiří Lehečka (Italy) Jannik Sinner
16 Feb	Qatar Open; Doha, Qatar; ATP 500; Hard – $2,833,335 –32S/16Q/16D; Singles – Doubles	(Finland) Harri Heliövaara (United Kingdom) Henry Patten; 6–3, 6–3	(United Kingdom) Julian Cash (United Kingdom) Lloyd Glasspool	Andrey Rublev (Czech Republic) Jakub Menšík	Karen Khachanov (Greece) Stefanos Tsitsipas (Czech Republic) Jiří Lehečka (Italy) Jannik Sinner
16 Feb	Rio Open; Rio de Janeiro, Brazil; ATP 500; Clay (red) – $2,469,450 – 32S/16Q/16D; Singles – Doubles	(Argentina) Tomás Martín Etcheverry; 3–6, 7–6^{(7–3)}, 6–4	(Chile) Alejandro Tabilo	(Peru) Ignacio Buse (Czech Republic) Vít Kopřiva	(Argentina) Thiago Agustín Tirante (Italy) Matteo Berrettini (Portugal) Jaime Faria (Argentina) Juan Manuel Cerúndolo
16 Feb	Rio Open; Rio de Janeiro, Brazil; ATP 500; Clay (red) – $2,469,450 – 32S/16Q/16D; Singles – Doubles	(Brazil) João Fonseca (Brazil) Marcelo Melo; 4–6, 6–3, [10–8]	(Germany) Constantin Frantzen (Netherlands) Robin Haase	(Peru) Ignacio Buse (Czech Republic) Vít Kopřiva	(Argentina) Thiago Agustín Tirante (Italy) Matteo Berrettini (Portugal) Jaime Faria (Argentina) Juan Manuel Cerúndolo
16 Feb	Delray Beach Open; Delray Beach, United States; ATP 250; Hard – $700,045 – 28S/16Q/16D; Singles – Doubles	(United States) Sebastian Korda; 6–4, 6–3	(United States) Tommy Paul	(United States) Learner Tien (Italy) Flavio Cobolli	(United States) Taylor Fritz (United States) Frances Tiafoe (Hong Kong) Coleman Wong (Norway) Casper Ruud
16 Feb	Delray Beach Open; Delray Beach, United States; ATP 250; Hard – $700,045 – 28S/16Q/16D; Singles – Doubles	(United States) Austin Krajicek (Croatia) Nikola Mektić; 6–7^{(3–7)}, 6–3, [11–9]	(United States) Benjamin Kittay (United States) Ryan Seggerman	(United States) Learner Tien (Italy) Flavio Cobolli	(United States) Taylor Fritz (United States) Frances Tiafoe (Hong Kong) Coleman Wong (Norway) Casper Ruud
23 Feb	Dubai Tennis Championships; Dubai, United Arab Emirates; ATP 500; Hard – $3,311,005 – 32S/16Q/16D; Singles – Doubles	Daniil Medvedev; Walkover	(Netherlands) Tallon Griekspoor	(Canada) Félix Auger-Aliassime; Andrey Rublev	(Czech Republic) Jiří Lehečka (United States) Jenson Brooksby (France) Arthur Rinderknech (Czech Republic) Jakub Menšík
23 Feb	Dubai Tennis Championships; Dubai, United Arab Emirates; ATP 500; Hard – $3,311,005 – 32S/16Q/16D; Singles – Doubles	(Finland) Harri Heliövaara (United Kingdom) Henry Patten; 7–5, 7–5	(El Salvador) Marcelo Arévalo (Croatia) Mate Pavić	(Canada) Félix Auger-Aliassime; Andrey Rublev	(Czech Republic) Jiří Lehečka (United States) Jenson Brooksby (France) Arthur Rinderknech (Czech Republic) Jakub Menšík
23 Feb	Mexican Open; Acapulco, Mexico; ATP 500; Hard – $2,469,450 – 32S/16Q/16D; Singles – Doubles	(Italy) Flavio Cobolli; 7–6^{(7–4)}, 6–4	(United States) Frances Tiafoe	(Serbia) Miomir Kecmanović (United States) Brandon Nakashima	(France) Térence Atmane (China) Wu Yibing (Italy) Mattia Bellucci (Monaco) Valentin Vacherot
23 Feb	Mexican Open; Acapulco, Mexico; ATP 500; Hard – $2,469,450 – 32S/16Q/16D; Singles – Doubles	(Brazil) Marcelo Melo (Germany) Alexander Zverev; 6–3, 6–4	(Austria) Alexander Erler (United States) Robert Galloway	(Serbia) Miomir Kecmanović (United States) Brandon Nakashima	(France) Térence Atmane (China) Wu Yibing (Italy) Mattia Bellucci (Monaco) Valentin Vacherot
23 Feb	Chile Open; Santiago, Chile; ATP 250; Clay (red) – $700,045 – 28S/16Q/16D; Singles – Doubles	(Italy) Luciano Darderi; 7–6^{(8–6)}, 7–5	(Germany) Yannick Hanfmann	(Argentina) Francisco Cerúndolo (Argentina) Sebastián Báez	(United States) Emilio Nava (Lithuania) Vilius Gaubas (Chile) Alejandro Tabilo (Italy) Andrea Pellegrino
23 Feb	Chile Open; Santiago, Chile; ATP 250; Clay (red) – $700,045 – 28S/16Q/16D; Singles – Doubles	(Brazil) Orlando Luz (Brazil) Rafael Matos; 6–4, 6–3	(Uruguay) Ariel Behar (Australia) Matthew Romios	(Argentina) Francisco Cerúndolo (Argentina) Sebastián Báez	(United States) Emilio Nava (Lithuania) Vilius Gaubas (Chile) Alejandro Tabilo (Italy) Andrea Pellegrino

=== March ===
Week	Tournament	Champions	Runners-up	Semifinalists	Quarterfinalists
2 Mar; 9 Mar	Indian Wells Open; Indian Wells, United States; ATP 1000; Hard – $9,415,725 – 96S/48Q/32D; Singles – Doubles – Mixed doubles	(Italy) Jannik Sinner; 7–6^{(8–6)}, 7–6^{(7–4)}	Daniil Medvedev	(Spain) Carlos Alcaraz (Germany) Alexander Zverev	(United Kingdom) Cameron Norrie (United Kingdom) Jack Draper (France) Arthur Fils (United States) Learner Tien
2 Mar; 9 Mar	Indian Wells Open; Indian Wells, United States; ATP 1000; Hard – $9,415,725 – 96S/48Q/32D; Singles – Doubles – Mixed doubles	(Argentina) Guido Andreozzi (France) Manuel Guinard; 7–6^{(7–3)}, 6–3	(France) Arthur Rinderknech (Monaco) Valentin Vacherot	(Spain) Carlos Alcaraz (Germany) Alexander Zverev	(United Kingdom) Cameron Norrie (United Kingdom) Jack Draper (France) Arthur Fils (United States) Learner Tien
2 Mar; 9 Mar	Indian Wells Open; Indian Wells, United States; ATP 1000; Hard – $9,415,725 – 96S/48Q/32D; Singles – Doubles – Mixed doubles	(Switzerland) Belinda Bencic (Italy) Flavio Cobolli; 6–3, 2–6, [10–7]	(Canada) Gabriela Dabrowski (United Kingdom) Lloyd Glasspool	(Spain) Carlos Alcaraz (Germany) Alexander Zverev	(United Kingdom) Cameron Norrie (United Kingdom) Jack Draper (France) Arthur Fils (United States) Learner Tien
16 Mar; 23 Mar	Miami Open; Miami Gardens, United States; ATP 1000; Hard – $9,415,725 – 96S/48Q/32D; Singles – Doubles	(Italy) Jannik Sinner; 6–4, 6–4	(Czech Republic) Jiří Lehečka	(France) Arthur Fils (Germany) Alexander Zverev	(Spain) Martín Landaluce (United States) Tommy Paul (Argentina) Francisco Cerúndolo (United States) Frances Tiafoe
16 Mar; 23 Mar	Miami Open; Miami Gardens, United States; ATP 1000; Hard – $9,415,725 – 96S/48Q/32D; Singles – Doubles	(Italy) Simone Bolelli (Italy) Andrea Vavassori; 6–4, 6–2	(Finland) Harri Heliövaara (United Kingdom) Henry Patten	(France) Arthur Fils (Germany) Alexander Zverev	(Spain) Martín Landaluce (United States) Tommy Paul (Argentina) Francisco Cerúndolo (United States) Frances Tiafoe
30 Mar	U.S. Men's Clay Court Championships; Houston, United States; ATP 250; Clay (maroon) – $700,045 – 28S/16Q/16D; Singles – Doubles	(United States) Tommy Paul; 6–1, 3–6, 7–5	(Argentina) Román Andrés Burruchaga	(Argentina) Thiago Agustín Tirante (United States) Frances Tiafoe	(United States) Ben Shelton (United States) Learner Tien (Argentina) Tomás Martín Etcheverry (Australia) Alexei Popyrin
30 Mar	U.S. Men's Clay Court Championships; Houston, United States; ATP 250; Clay (maroon) – $700,045 – 28S/16Q/16D; Singles – Doubles	(Ecuador) Andrés Andrade (United States) Ben Shelton; 4–6, 6–3, [10–6]	(Brazil) Orlando Luz (Brazil) Rafael Matos	(Argentina) Thiago Agustín Tirante (United States) Frances Tiafoe	(United States) Ben Shelton (United States) Learner Tien (Argentina) Tomás Martín Etcheverry (Australia) Alexei Popyrin
30 Mar	Grand Prix Hassan II; Marrakesh, Morocco; ATP 250; Clay (red) – €612,620 –28S/16Q/16D; Singles – Doubles	(Spain) Rafael Jódar; 6–3, 6–2	(Argentina) Marco Trungelliti	(Italy) Luciano Darderi (Argentina) Camilo Ugo Carabelli	(Germany) Yannick Hanfmann (France) Corentin Moutet (France) Alexandre Müller (France) Luca Van Assche
30 Mar	Grand Prix Hassan II; Marrakesh, Morocco; ATP 250; Clay (red) – €612,620 –28S/16Q/16D; Singles – Doubles	(United States) Robert Cash (United States) JJ Tracy; 6–2, 6–3	(United States) Vasil Kirkov (Netherlands) Bart Stevens	(Italy) Luciano Darderi (Argentina) Camilo Ugo Carabelli	(Germany) Yannick Hanfmann (France) Corentin Moutet (France) Alexandre Müller (France) Luca Van Assche
30 Mar	Romanian Open; Bucharest, Romania; ATP 250; Clay (red) – €612,620 – 28S/16Q/16D; Singles – Doubles	(Argentina) Mariano Navone; 6–2, 4–6, 7–5	(Spain) Daniel Mérida	(Netherlands) Botic van de Zandschulp (Hungary) Fábián Marozsán	(Slovakia) Alex Molčan (Bosnia and Herzegovina) Damir Džumhur (Germany) Daniel Altmaier (France) Titouan Droguet
30 Mar	Romanian Open; Bucharest, Romania; ATP 250; Clay (red) – €612,620 – 28S/16Q/16D; Singles – Doubles	(France) Sadio Doumbia (France) Fabien Reboul; 6–1, 6–4	(Czech Republic) Adam Pavlásek (Czech Republic) Patrik Rikl	(Netherlands) Botic van de Zandschulp (Hungary) Fábián Marozsán	(Slovakia) Alex Molčan (Bosnia and Herzegovina) Damir Džumhur (Germany) Daniel Altmaier (France) Titouan Droguet

=== April ===
Week	Tournament	Champions	Runners-up	Semifinalists	Quarterfinalists
6 Apr	Monte-Carlo Masters; Roquebrune-Cap-Martin, France; ATP 1000; Clay (red) – €6,309,095 – 56S/28Q/32D; Singles – Doubles	(Italy) Jannik Sinner; 7–6^{(7–5)}, 6–3	(Spain) Carlos Alcaraz	(Monaco) Valentin Vacherot (Germany) Alexander Zverev	(Kazakhstan) Alexander Bublik (Australia) Alex de Minaur (Brazil) João Fonseca (Canada) Félix Auger-Aliassime
6 Apr	Monte-Carlo Masters; Roquebrune-Cap-Martin, France; ATP 1000; Clay (red) – €6,309,095 – 56S/28Q/32D; Singles – Doubles	(Germany) Kevin Krawietz (Germany) Tim Pütz; 4–6, 6–2, [10–8]	(El Salvador) Marcelo Arévalo (Croatia) Mate Pavić	(Monaco) Valentin Vacherot (Germany) Alexander Zverev	(Kazakhstan) Alexander Bublik (Australia) Alex de Minaur (Brazil) João Fonseca (Canada) Félix Auger-Aliassime
13 Apr	Barcelona Open; Barcelona, Spain; ATP 500; Clay (red) – €2,950,310 – 32S/24Q/16D; Singles – Doubles	(France) Arthur Fils; 6–2, 7–6^{(7–2)}	Andrey Rublev	(Serbia) Hamad Medjedovic (Spain) Rafael Jódar	(Czech Republic) Tomáš Macháč (Portugal) Nuno Borges (United Kingdom) Cameron Norrie (Italy) Lorenzo Musetti
13 Apr	Barcelona Open; Barcelona, Spain; ATP 500; Clay (red) – €2,950,310 – 32S/24Q/16D; Singles – Doubles	(United Kingdom) Julian Cash (United Kingdom) Lloyd Glasspool; 6–3, 6–4	(France) Pierre-Hugues Herbert (Italy) Andrea Vavassori	(Serbia) Hamad Medjedovic (Spain) Rafael Jódar	(Czech Republic) Tomáš Macháč (Portugal) Nuno Borges (United Kingdom) Cameron Norrie (Italy) Lorenzo Musetti
13 Apr	Bavarian International Tennis Championships; Munich, Germany; ATP 500; Clay (red) – €2,561,110 – 32S/16Q/16D; Singles – Doubles	(United States) Ben Shelton; 6–2, 7–5	(Italy) Flavio Cobolli	(Germany) Alexander Zverev (Slovakia) Alex Molčan	(Argentina) Francisco Cerúndolo (Czech Republic) Vít Kopřiva (Canada) Denis Shapovalov (Brazil) João Fonseca
13 Apr	Bavarian International Tennis Championships; Munich, Germany; ATP 500; Clay (red) – €2,561,110 – 32S/16Q/16D; Singles – Doubles	(Germany) Jakob Schnaitter (Germany) Mark Wallner; 6–4, 6–7^{(4–7)}, [12–10]	(France) Théo Arribagé (France) Albano Olivetti	(Germany) Alexander Zverev (Slovakia) Alex Molčan	(Argentina) Francisco Cerúndolo (Czech Republic) Vít Kopřiva (Canada) Denis Shapovalov (Brazil) João Fonseca
20 Apr; 27 Apr	Madrid Open; Madrid, Spain; ATP 1000; Clay (red) – €8,235,540 – 96S/48Q/32D; Singles – Doubles	(Italy) Jannik Sinner; 6–1, 6–2	(Germany) Alexander Zverev	(France) Arthur Fils (Belgium) Alexander Blockx	(Spain) Rafael Jódar (Czech Republic) Jiří Lehečka (Norway) Casper Ruud (Italy) Flavio Cobolli
20 Apr; 27 Apr	Madrid Open; Madrid, Spain; ATP 1000; Clay (red) – €8,235,540 – 96S/48Q/32D; Singles – Doubles	(Finland) Harri Heliövaara (United Kingdom) Henry Patten; 6–3, 3–6, [10–7]	(Argentina) Guido Andreozzi (France) Manuel Guinard	(France) Arthur Fils (Belgium) Alexander Blockx	(Spain) Rafael Jódar (Czech Republic) Jiří Lehečka (Norway) Casper Ruud (Italy) Flavio Cobolli

=== May ===
Week	Tournament	Champions	Runners-up	Semifinalists	Quarterfinalists
4 May; 11 May	Italian Open; Rome, Italy; ATP 1000; Clay (red) – €8,235,540 – 96S/48Q/32D; Singles – Doubles	(Italy) Jannik Sinner; 6–4, 6–4	(Norway) Casper Ruud	Daniil Medvedev (Italy) Luciano Darderi	Andrey Rublev (Spain) Martín Landaluce; Karen Khachanov (Spain) Rafael Jódar
4 May; 11 May	Italian Open; Rome, Italy; ATP 1000; Clay (red) – €8,235,540 – 96S/48Q/32D; Singles – Doubles	(Italy) Simone Bolelli (Italy) Andrea Vavassori; 7–6^{(10–8)}, 6–7^{(3–7)}, [10–3]	(Spain) Marcel Granollers (Argentina) Horacio Zeballos	Daniil Medvedev (Italy) Luciano Darderi	Andrey Rublev (Spain) Martín Landaluce; Karen Khachanov (Spain) Rafael Jódar
18 May	Hamburg Open; Hamburg, Germany; ATP 500; Clay (red) – €2,219,670 – 32S/16Q/16D; Singles – Doubles	(Peru) Ignacio Buse; 7–6^{(8–6)}, 4–6, 6–3	(United States) Tommy Paul	(United States) Aleksandar Kovacevic (Australia) Alex de Minaur	(Argentina) Camilo Ugo Carabelli (France) Ugo Humbert (Italy) Luciano Darderi (Germany) Daniel Altmaier
18 May	Hamburg Open; Hamburg, Germany; ATP 500; Clay (red) – €2,219,670 – 32S/16Q/16D; Singles – Doubles	(Germany) Kevin Krawietz (Germany) Tim Pütz; 6–3, 4–6, [10–8]	(France) Sadio Doumbia (France) Fabien Reboul	(United States) Aleksandar Kovacevic (Australia) Alex de Minaur	(Argentina) Camilo Ugo Carabelli (France) Ugo Humbert (Italy) Luciano Darderi (Germany) Daniel Altmaier
18 May	Geneva Open; Geneva, Switzerland; ATP 250; Clay (red) – €612,620 – 28S/16Q/16D; Singles – Doubles	(United States) Learner Tien; 3–6, 6–3, 7–5	(Argentina) Mariano Navone	(Norway) Casper Ruud (Kazakhstan) Alexander Bublik	(Australia) Alexei Popyrin (Spain) Jaume Munar (United States) Alex Michelsen (France) Arthur Rinderknech
18 May	Geneva Open; Geneva, Switzerland; ATP 250; Clay (red) – €612,620 – 28S/16Q/16D; Singles – Doubles	(Monaco) Romain Arneodo (Australia) Marc Polmans; 3–6, 7–6^{(7–2)}, [10–7]	(India) Yuki Bhambri (New Zealand) Michael Venus	(Norway) Casper Ruud (Kazakhstan) Alexander Bublik	(Australia) Alexei Popyrin (Spain) Jaume Munar (United States) Alex Michelsen (France) Arthur Rinderknech
25 May; 1 Jun	French Open; Paris, France; Grand Slam; Clay (red) – € –128S/128Q/64D/32X; Singles – Doubles – Mixed doubles	(Germany) Alexander Zverev; 6–1, 4–6, 6–4, 6–7^{(5–7)}, 6–1	(Italy) Flavio Cobolli	(Italy) Matteo Arnaldi (Czech Republic) Jakub Menšík	(Italy) Matteo Berrettini (Canada) Félix Auger-Aliassime (Brazil) João Fonseca (Spain) Rafael Jódar
25 May; 1 Jun	French Open; Paris, France; Grand Slam; Clay (red) – € –128S/128Q/64D/32X; Singles – Doubles – Mixed doubles	(Spain) Marcel Granollers (Argentina) Horacio Zeballos; 6–4, 6–2	(Finland) Harri Heliövaara (United Kingdom) Henry Patten	(Italy) Matteo Arnaldi (Czech Republic) Jakub Menšík	(Italy) Matteo Berrettini (Canada) Félix Auger-Aliassime (Brazil) João Fonseca (Spain) Rafael Jódar
25 May; 1 Jun	French Open; Paris, France; Grand Slam; Clay (red) – € –128S/128Q/64D/32X; Singles – Doubles – Mixed doubles	(Italy) Sara Errani (Italy) Andrea Vavassori; 4–6, 6–3, [10–4]	(Canada) Gabriela Dabrowski (United States) Evan King	(Italy) Matteo Arnaldi (Czech Republic) Jakub Menšík	(Italy) Matteo Berrettini (Canada) Félix Auger-Aliassime (Brazil) João Fonseca (Spain) Rafael Jódar

=== June ===
Week	Tournament	Champions	Runners-up	Semifinalists	Quarterfinalists
8 Jun	Stuttgart Open; Stuttgart, Germany; ATP 250; Grass – €757,320 – 28S/16Q/16D; Singles – Doubles	(United States) Ben Shelton; 6–4, 2–6, 6–4	(United States) Taylor Fritz	(Czech Republic) Jiří Lehečka (Kazakhstan) Alexander Bublik	(Japan) Sho Shimabukuro (United States) Frances Tiafoe (France) Giovanni Mpetshi Perricard (Italy) Mattia Bellucci
8 Jun	Stuttgart Open; Stuttgart, Germany; ATP 250; Grass – €757,320 – 28S/16Q/16D; Singles – Doubles	(Germany) Yannick Hanfmann (Germany) Jan-Lennard Struff; 7–6^{(7–2)}, 3–6, [11–9]	(Estonia) Daniil Glinka (Greece) Stefanos Sakellaridis	(Czech Republic) Jiří Lehečka (Kazakhstan) Alexander Bublik	(Japan) Sho Shimabukuro (United States) Frances Tiafoe (France) Giovanni Mpetshi Perricard (Italy) Mattia Bellucci
8 Jun	Rosmalen Open 's-Hertogenbosch, Netherlands; ATP 250; Grass – €723,435 – 28S/16Q/16D; Singles – Doubles	(Poland) Kamil Majchrzak; 6–3, 2–6, 7–6^{(7–5)}	(Australia) Alex de Minaur	Daniil Medvedev (France) Adrian Mannarino	(Canada) Félix Auger-Aliassime (Croatia) Marin Čilić (China) Zhang Zhizhen (France) Benjamin Bonzi
8 Jun	Rosmalen Open 's-Hertogenbosch, Netherlands; ATP 250; Grass – €723,435 – 28S/16Q/16D; Singles – Doubles	(Netherlands) Sander Arends (Netherlands) David Pel; 7–6^{(8–6)}, 7–6^{(7–5)}	(Belgium) Zizou Bergs (France) Arthur Rinderknech	Daniil Medvedev (France) Adrian Mannarino	(Canada) Félix Auger-Aliassime (Croatia) Marin Čilić (China) Zhang Zhizhen (France) Benjamin Bonzi
15 Jun	Halle Open; Halle, Germany; ATP 500; Grass – €2,583,330 – 32S/16Q/16D; Singles – Doubles	(United States) Frances Tiafoe; 6–4, 6–4	(United States) Taylor Fritz	(Germany) Alexander Zverev (Germany) Daniel Altmaier	(Belgium) Raphaël Collignon (United States) Ben Shelton; Daniil Medvedev (Canada) Félix Auger-Aliassime
15 Jun	Halle Open; Halle, Germany; ATP 500; Grass – €2,583,330 – 32S/16Q/16D; Singles – Doubles	(France) Théo Arribagé (France) Albano Olivetti; 7–6^{(7–2)}, 6–4	(Germany) Daniel Altmaier (Brazil) João Fonseca	(Germany) Alexander Zverev (Germany) Daniel Altmaier	(Belgium) Raphaël Collignon (United States) Ben Shelton; Daniil Medvedev (Canada) Félix Auger-Aliassime
15 Jun	Queen's Club Championships; London, United Kingdom; ATP 500; Grass – €2,583,330 – 32S/16Q/16D; Singles – Doubles	(Argentina) Francisco Cerúndolo; 6–7^{(4–7)}, 6–4, 6–3	(United States) Tommy Paul	(United States) Brandon Nakashima (France) Ugo Humbert	(Australia) Alex de Minaur (United Kingdom) Arthur Fery (Spain) Alejandro Davidovich Fokina (Australia) Rinky Hijikata
15 Jun	Queen's Club Championships; London, United Kingdom; ATP 500; Grass – €2,583,330 – 32S/16Q/16D; Singles – Doubles	(El Salvador) Marcelo Arévalo (Croatia) Mate Pavić; 6–2, 6–4	(Finland) Harri Heliövaara (United Kingdom) Henry Patten	(United States) Brandon Nakashima (France) Ugo Humbert	(Australia) Alex de Minaur (United Kingdom) Arthur Fery (Spain) Alejandro Davidovich Fokina (Australia) Rinky Hijikata
22 Jun	Mallorca Championships; Santa Ponsa, Spain; ATP 250; Grass – €612,620 –28S/16Q/16D; Singles – Doubles	(Spain) Alejandro Davidovich Fokina; 7–6^{(7–4)}, 6–3	(United States) Ethan Quinn	(Portugal) Nuno Borges (Hungary) Fábián Marozsán	(Italy) Luciano Darderi (Czech Republic) Vít Kopřiva (Serbia) Miomir Kecmanović (Bulgaria) Grigor Dimitrov
22 Jun	Mallorca Championships; Santa Ponsa, Spain; ATP 250; Grass – €612,620 –28S/16Q/16D; Singles – Doubles	(France) Théo Arribagé (France) Albano Olivetti; 7–6^{(8–6)}, 3–6, [11–9]	(Sweden) André Göransson (United States) Evan King	(Portugal) Nuno Borges (Hungary) Fábián Marozsán	(Italy) Luciano Darderi (Czech Republic) Vít Kopřiva (Serbia) Miomir Kecmanović (Bulgaria) Grigor Dimitrov
22 Jun	Eastbourne Open; Eastbourne, United Kingdom; ATP 250; Grass – €773,465 – 28S/16Q/16D; Singles – Doubles	(Belgium) Zizou Bergs; 3–6, 6–1, 6–4	(France) Ugo Humbert	(United Kingdom) Toby Samuel (United Kingdom) Jack Draper	(United Kingdom) Jan Choinski (Argentina) Juan Manuel Cerúndolo (Canada) Gabriel Diallo (France) Quentin Halys
22 Jun	Eastbourne Open; Eastbourne, United Kingdom; ATP 250; Grass – €773,465 – 28S/16Q/16D; Singles – Doubles	(Monaco) Hugo Nys (France) Édouard Roger-Vasselin; 6–3, 4–6, [10–8]	(Argentina) Guido Andreozzi (France) Manuel Guinard	(United Kingdom) Toby Samuel (United Kingdom) Jack Draper	(United Kingdom) Jan Choinski (Argentina) Juan Manuel Cerúndolo (Canada) Gabriel Diallo (France) Quentin Halys
29 Jun; 6 Jul	Wimbledon; London, United Kingdom; Grand Slam; Grass – £30,060,000 – 128S/128Q/64D/32X; Singles – Doubles – Mixed doubles	(Italy) Jannik Sinner; 6–7^{(7–9)}, 7–6^{(7–2)}, 6–3, 6–4	(Germany) Alexander Zverev	(Serbia) Novak Djokovic (United Kingdom) Arthur Fery	(Germany) Jan-Lennard Struff (Canada) Félix Auger-Aliassime (Italy) Flavio Cobolli (United States) Taylor Fritz
29 Jun; 6 Jul	Wimbledon; London, United Kingdom; Grand Slam; Grass – £30,060,000 – 128S/128Q/64D/32X; Singles – Doubles – Mixed doubles	(Finland) Harri Heliövaara (United Kingdom) Henry Patten; 7–6^{(7–4)}, 7–6^{(7–3)}	(El Salvador) Marcelo Arévalo (Croatia) Mate Pavić	(Serbia) Novak Djokovic (United Kingdom) Arthur Fery	(Germany) Jan-Lennard Struff (Canada) Félix Auger-Aliassime (Italy) Flavio Cobolli (United States) Taylor Fritz
29 Jun; 6 Jul	Wimbledon; London, United Kingdom; Grand Slam; Grass – £30,060,000 – 128S/128Q/64D/32X; Singles – Doubles – Mixed doubles	(El Salvador) Marcelo Arévalo (Latvia) Jeļena Ostapenko; 4–6, 7–5, 6–2	(Australia) Marc Polmans (Australia) Storm Hunter	(Serbia) Novak Djokovic (United Kingdom) Arthur Fery	(Germany) Jan-Lennard Struff (Canada) Félix Auger-Aliassime (Italy) Flavio Cobolli (United States) Taylor Fritz

=== July ===
Week	Tournament	Champions	Runners-up	Semifinalists	Quarterfinalists
13 Jul	Swedish Open; Båstad, Sweden; ATP 250; Clay (red) – €612,620 – 28S/16Q/16D; Singles – Doubles	Andrey Rublev; 6–4, 6–3	(Italy) Luciano Darderi	(Chile) Alejandro Tabilo (Paraguay) Adolfo Daniel Vallejo	(Argentina) Sebastián Báez (Argentina) Thiago Agustín Tirante (Italy) Stefano Travaglia (Portugal) Nuno Borges
13 Jul	Swedish Open; Båstad, Sweden; ATP 250; Clay (red) – €612,620 – 28S/16Q/16D; Singles – Doubles	(France) Sadio Doumbia (France) Fabien Reboul; 6–3, 6–4	(France) Théo Arribagé (Portugal) Francisco Cabral	(Chile) Alejandro Tabilo (Paraguay) Adolfo Daniel Vallejo	(Argentina) Sebastián Báez (Argentina) Thiago Agustín Tirante (Italy) Stefano Travaglia (Portugal) Nuno Borges
13 Jul	Swiss Open; Gstaad, Switzerland; ATP 250; Clay (red) – €612,620 – 28S/16Q/16D; Singles – Doubles	(Greece) Stefanos Tsitsipas; 6–4, 6–7^{(3–7)}, 6–3	(Belgium) Raphaël Collignon	(Kazakhstan) Alexander Shevchenko (Argentina) Juan Manuel Cerúndolo	(France) Quentin Halys (France) Arthur Rinderknech (Monaco) Valentin Vacherot (Norway) Casper Ruud
13 Jul	Swiss Open; Gstaad, Switzerland; ATP 250; Clay (red) – €612,620 – 28S/16Q/16D; Singles – Doubles	(Austria) Lucas Miedler (Australia) Marc Polmans; 6–3, 6–4	(Brazil) Marcelo Demoliner (United States) Robert Galloway	(Kazakhstan) Alexander Shevchenko (Argentina) Juan Manuel Cerúndolo	(France) Quentin Halys (France) Arthur Rinderknech (Monaco) Valentin Vacherot (Norway) Casper Ruud
13 Jul	Croatia Open; Umag, Croatia; ATP 250; Clay (red) – €612,620 – 28S/16Q/16D; Singles – Doubles	(Spain) Daniel Mérida; 6–2, 5–7, 6–2	(Bosnia and Herzegovina) Damir Džumhur	(Argentina) Román Andrés Burruchaga (Slovakia) Alex Molčan	(Argentina) Camilo Ugo Carabelli (France) Titouan Droguet (Italy) Matteo Arnaldi (Spain) Alejandro Davidovich Fokina
13 Jul	Croatia Open; Umag, Croatia; ATP 250; Clay (red) – €612,620 – 28S/16Q/16D; Singles – Doubles	(Czech Republic) Adam Pavlásek (Czech Republic) Patrik Rikl; 6–3, 4–6, [10–6]	(United Kingdom) David Stevenson (United Kingdom) Marcus Willis	(Argentina) Román Andrés Burruchaga (Slovakia) Alex Molčan	(Argentina) Camilo Ugo Carabelli (France) Titouan Droguet (Italy) Matteo Arnaldi (Spain) Alejandro Davidovich Fokina
20 Jul	Austrian Open; Kitzbühel, Austria; ATP 250; Clay (red) – €612,620 – 28S/16Q/16D; Singles – Doubles	(France) Quentin Halys; 6–4, 7–6^{(8–6)}	(Kazakhstan) Alexander Bublik	(Argentina) Tomás Martín Etcheverry (Germany) Yannick Hanfmann	(Slovakia) Alex Molčan (Peru) Ignacio Buse (Argentina) Sebastián Báez (Argentina) Mariano Navone
20 Jul	Austrian Open; Kitzbühel, Austria; ATP 250; Clay (red) – €612,620 – 28S/16Q/16D; Singles – Doubles	(Austria) Lucas Miedler (Australia) Marc Polmans; 6–2, 6–2	(Germany) Jakob Schnaitter (Germany) Mark Wallner	(Argentina) Tomás Martín Etcheverry (Germany) Yannick Hanfmann	(Slovakia) Alex Molčan (Peru) Ignacio Buse (Argentina) Sebastián Báez (Argentina) Mariano Navone
20 Jul	Estoril Open; Estoril, Portugal; ATP 250; Clay (red) – €612,620 – 28S/16Q/16D; Singles – Doubles	(France) Luca Van Assche; 6–4, 4–6, 7–5	(Belgium) Alexander Blockx	(France) Hugo Gaston (Italy) Luciano Darderi	Andrey Rublev (Portugal) Tiago Torres (Argentina) Román Andrés Burruchaga (Portugal) Jaime Faria
20 Jul	Estoril Open; Estoril, Portugal; ATP 250; Clay (red) – €612,620 – 28S/16Q/16D; Singles – Doubles	(France) Titouan Droguet (France) Kyrian Jacquet; 7–6^{(7–2)}, 6–7^{(4–7)}, [11–9]	(Brazil) Orlando Luz (Brazil) Rafael Matos	(France) Hugo Gaston (Italy) Luciano Darderi	Andrey Rublev (Portugal) Tiago Torres (Argentina) Román Andrés Burruchaga (Portugal) Jaime Faria
27 Jul	Washington Open; Washington, D.C., United States; ATP 500; Hard – $2,469,450 – 32S/24Q/16D; Singles – Doubles	(United States) Taylor Fritz; 7–6^{(7–2)}, 6–4	(Spain) Rafael Jódar	(United States) Brandon Nakashima (Chile) Alejandro Tabilo	(Australia) Alex de Minaur (United States) Alex Michelsen (Italy) Lorenzo Musetti (United States) Ben Shelton
27 Jul	Washington Open; Washington, D.C., United States; ATP 500; Hard – $2,469,450 – 32S/24Q/16D; Singles – Doubles	(United Kingdom) Julian Cash (United Kingdom) Lloyd Glasspool; 6–3, 6–4	(United States) Austin Krajicek (Croatia) Nikola Mektić	(United States) Brandon Nakashima (Chile) Alejandro Tabilo	(Australia) Alex de Minaur (United States) Alex Michelsen (Italy) Lorenzo Musetti (United States) Ben Shelton
27 Jul	Los Cabos Open; Los Cabos, Mexico; ATP 250; Hard – $909,790 – 28S/16Q/16D; Singles – Doubles	(France) Arthur Géa; 6–3, 6–4	(Canada) Denis Shapovalov	(Hong Kong) Coleman Wong (United Kingdom) Cameron Norrie	(United States) Jenson Brooksby (Argentina) Francisco Cerúndolo (Australia) Bernard Tomic (Czech Republic) Dalibor Svrčina
27 Jul	Los Cabos Open; Los Cabos, Mexico; ATP 250; Hard – $909,790 – 28S/16Q/16D; Singles – Doubles	(United States) Ryan Seggerman (United States) Patrik Trhac; 7–6^{(7–4)}, 6–7^{(5–7)}, [10–8]	(New Zealand) Finn Reynolds (New Zealand) James Watt	(Hong Kong) Coleman Wong (United Kingdom) Cameron Norrie	(United States) Jenson Brooksby (Argentina) Francisco Cerúndolo (Australia) Bernard Tomic (Czech Republic) Dalibor Svrčina

=== August ===
Week	Tournament	Champions	Runners-up	Semifinalists	Quarterfinalists
3 Aug; 10 Aug	Canadian Open; Montreal, Canada; ATP 1000; Hard – $9,415,724 – 96S/32Q/32D; Singles – Doubles	(United States) Ben Shelton; 6–3, 7–6^{(7–4)}	(United States) Brandon Nakashima	(United States) Learner Tien (Spain) Rafael Jódar	(Spain) Daniel Mérida (Czech Republic) Jakub Menšík (France) Arthur Fils (Italy) Luciano Darderi
3 Aug; 10 Aug	Canadian Open; Montreal, Canada; ATP 1000; Hard – $9,415,724 – 96S/32Q/32D; Singles – Doubles	(Brazil) Orlando Luz (Brazil) Rafael Matos; 5–7, 6–4, [10–6]	(El Salvador) Marcelo Arévalo (Croatia) Mate Pavić	(United States) Learner Tien (Spain) Rafael Jódar	(Spain) Daniel Mérida (Czech Republic) Jakub Menšík (France) Arthur Fils (Italy) Luciano Darderi
10 Aug; 17 Aug	Cincinnati Open; Mason, United States; ATP 1000; Hard – $9,415,725 – 96S/48Q/32D; Singles – Doubles	(France) Arthur Fils; 6–3, 1–6, 6–0	(United States) Frances Tiafoe	(Italy) Flavio Cobolli (United States) Brandon Nakashima	(United States) Tommy Paul (Argentina) Thiago Agustín Tirante (United States) Taylor Fritz (Italy) Lorenzo Musetti
10 Aug; 17 Aug	Cincinnati Open; Mason, United States; ATP 1000; Hard – $9,415,725 – 96S/48Q/32D; Singles – Doubles	(Brazil) Orlando Luz (Brazil) Rafael Matos; 6–4, 3–6, [10–7]	(Germany) Constantin Frantzen (Netherlands) Robin Haase	(Italy) Flavio Cobolli (United States) Brandon Nakashima	(United States) Tommy Paul (Argentina) Thiago Agustín Tirante (United States) Taylor Fritz (Italy) Lorenzo Musetti
24 Aug	Winston-Salem Open; Winston-Salem, United States; ATP 250; Hard – $818,240 –48S/16Q/16D; Singles – Doubles	(Peru) Ignacio Buse; 6–3, 6–2	(United Kingdom) Arthur Fery	(Australia) James Duckworth (France) Benjamin Bonzi	(Hungary) Fábián Marozsán (United States) Aleksandar Kovacevic (Argentina) Juan Manuel Cerúndolo (Netherlands) Botic van de Zandschulp
24 Aug	Winston-Salem Open; Winston-Salem, United States; ATP 250; Hard – $818,240 –48S/16Q/16D; Singles – Doubles	(Czech Republic) Petr Nouza (Austria) Neil Oberleitner; 7–5, 6–4	(United States) Austin Krajicek (Croatia) Nikola Mektić	(Australia) James Duckworth (France) Benjamin Bonzi	(Hungary) Fábián Marozsán (United States) Aleksandar Kovacevic (Argentina) Juan Manuel Cerúndolo (Netherlands) Botic van de Zandschulp
31 Aug; 7 Sep	US Open; New York City, United States; Grand Slam; Hard – $ – 128S/128Q/64D/16X; Singles – Doubles – Mixed doubles	(Germany) Alexander Zverev; 6–3, 7–6^{(7–2)}, 5–7, 6–2	(United States) Ben Shelton	Karen Khachanov (United States) Frances Tiafoe	(Netherlands) Botic van de Zandschulp (Belgium) Alexander Blockx (United States) Alex Michelsen (Spain) Carlos Alcaraz
31 Aug; 7 Sep	US Open; New York City, United States; Grand Slam; Hard – $ – 128S/128Q/64D/16X; Singles – Doubles – Mixed doubles	(United States) Christian Harrison (United Kingdom) Neal Skupski; 6–4, 7–6^{(8–6)}	(Germany) Kevin Krawietz (Germany) Tim Pütz	Karen Khachanov (United States) Frances Tiafoe	(Netherlands) Botic van de Zandschulp (Belgium) Alexander Blockx (United States) Alex Michelsen (Spain) Carlos Alcaraz
31 Aug; 7 Sep	US Open; New York City, United States; Grand Slam; Hard – $ – 128S/128Q/64D/16X; Singles – Doubles – Mixed doubles	(Czech Republic) Jakub Menšík (Czech Republic) Karolína Muchová; 6–3, 1–6, [10–6]	(Italy) Flavio Cobolli (Switzerland) Belinda Bencic	Karen Khachanov (United States) Frances Tiafoe	(Netherlands) Botic van de Zandschulp (Belgium) Alexander Blockx (United States) Alex Michelsen (Spain) Carlos Alcaraz

=== September ===
Week	Tournament	Champions	Runners-up	Semifinalists	Quarterfinalists
14 Sep	2026 Davis Cup Qualifiers second round Santiago, Chile – clay Halle, Germany – hard (i); London, United Kingdom – hard (i); Vienna, Austria – clay Seoul, South Korea – hard Prague, Czech Republic – hard (i); Quebec City, Canada – hard (i)	Qualifying round winners Spain; Germany; Great Britain; Austria; South Korea; Czech Republic; Canada	Qualifying round losers Chile; Croatia; Ecuador; Belgium; India; United States; France		
21 Sep	Laver Cup; London, United Kingdom; Hard (i) – $1,500,000	Team Europe; 13–5	Team World		
21 Sep	Chengdu Open; Chengdu, China; ATP 250; Hard – $1,210,115 – 28S/16Q/16D; Singles – Doubles	(Spain) Alejandro Davidovich Fokina; 6–4, 7–6^{(9–7)}	(Poland) Hubert Hurkacz	(Canada) Denis Shapovalov (Georgia (country)) Nikoloz Basilashvili	(South Africa) Lloyd Harris (France) Adrian Mannarino (United States) Jenson Brooksby (France) Alexandre Müller
21 Sep	Chengdu Open; Chengdu, China; ATP 250; Hard – $1,210,115 – 28S/16Q/16D; Singles – Doubles	(United Kingdom) Luke Johnson (Poland) Jan Zieliński; 7–6^{(9–7)}, 7–5	(United States) Robert Galloway (Sweden) André Göransson	(Canada) Denis Shapovalov (Georgia (country)) Nikoloz Basilashvili	(South Africa) Lloyd Harris (France) Adrian Mannarino (United States) Jenson Brooksby (France) Alexandre Müller
21 Sep	Hangzhou Open; Hangzhou, China; ATP 250; Hard – $1,039,090 – 28S/16Q/16D; Singles – Doubles	Daniil Medvedev; 7–5, 6–4	Andrey Rublev	Roman Safiullin (France) Kyrian Jacquet	(Hong Kong) Coleman Wong (China) Bu Yunchaokete (Hungary) Fábián Marozsán (France) Hugo Gaston
21 Sep	Hangzhou Open; Hangzhou, China; ATP 250; Hard – $1,039,090 – 28S/16Q/16D; Singles – Doubles	(Portugal) Francisco Cabral (United States) JJ Tracy; 7–5, 6–4	(Netherlands) Sander Arends (Netherlands) David Pel	Roman Safiullin (France) Kyrian Jacquet	(Hong Kong) Coleman Wong (China) Bu Yunchaokete (Hungary) Fábián Marozsán (France) Hugo Gaston
28 Sep	China Open; Beijing, China; ATP 500; Hard – $4,089,385 – 32S/16Q/16D; Singles – Doubles	(Serbia) Novak Djokovic; 7–6^{(7–3)}, 0–1 ret.	(Australia) Alex de Minaur	Daniil Medvedev (Poland) Hubert Hurkacz	(Germany) Alexander Zverev (Argentina) Francisco Cerúndolo; Andrey Rublev; Karen Khachanov
28 Sep	China Open; Beijing, China; ATP 500; Hard – $4,089,385 – 32S/16Q/16D; Singles – Doubles	(United Kingdom) Julian Cash (United Kingdom) Lloyd Glasspool; 6–3, 3–6, [10–6]	(Netherlands) Sander Arends (Netherlands) David Pel	Daniil Medvedev (Poland) Hubert Hurkacz	(Germany) Alexander Zverev (Argentina) Francisco Cerúndolo; Andrey Rublev; Karen Khachanov
28 Sep	Japan Open; Tokyo, Japan; ATP 500; Hard – $2,342,275 –32S/16Q/16D; Singles – Doubles	(Spain) Carlos Alcaraz; 7–6^{(7–4)}, 6–4	(Czech Republic) Jiří Lehečka	(Spain) Jaume Munar (Monaco) Valentin Vacherot	(Canada) Denis Shapovalov (France) Kyrian Jacquet (Paraguay) Adolfo Daniel Vallejo (France) Arthur Fils
28 Sep	Japan Open; Tokyo, Japan; ATP 500; Hard – $2,342,275 –32S/16Q/16D; Singles – Doubles	(United States) Austin Krajicek (Croatia) Nikola Mektić; 7–6^{(7–5)}, 5–7, [10–6]	(France) Théo Arribagé (France) Albano Olivetti	(Spain) Jaume Munar (Monaco) Valentin Vacherot	(Canada) Denis Shapovalov (France) Kyrian Jacquet (Paraguay) Adolfo Daniel Vallejo (France) Arthur Fils

=== October ===
Week	Tournament	Champions	Runners-up	Semifinalists	Quarterfinalists
5 Oct; 12 Oct	Shanghai Masters; Shanghai, China; ATP 1000; Hard – $9,415,725 – 96S/48Q/32D; Singles – Doubles	(Spain) Alejandro Davidovich Fokina; 1–6, 7–6^{(7–5)}, 6–4	(Spain) Rafael Jódar	(Germany) Alexander Zverev; Daniil Medvedev	(Australia) Alex de Minaur (France) Arthur Géa (Norway) Casper Ruud (United States) Tommy Paul
5 Oct; 12 Oct	Shanghai Masters; Shanghai, China; ATP 1000; Hard – $9,415,725 – 96S/48Q/32D; Singles – Doubles	(Austria) Lucas Miedler (Austria) Neil Oberleitner; 6–3, 6–4	(Portugal) Francisco Cabral (United States) JJ Tracy	(Germany) Alexander Zverev; Daniil Medvedev	(Australia) Alex de Minaur (France) Arthur Géa (Norway) Casper Ruud (United States) Tommy Paul
19 Oct	Almaty Open; Almaty, Kazakhstan; ATP 250; Hard (i) – $1,075,160 – 28S/16Q/16D; Singles – Doubles	Daniil Medvedev; 6–7^{(6–8)}, 6–1, 6–3	(Georgia (country)) Nikoloz Basilashvili	(Kazakhstan) Alexander Bublik (Greece) Stefanos Tsitsipas	(France) Térence Atmane; Karen Khachanov (France) Adrian Mannarino (Australia) James Duckworth
19 Oct	Almaty Open; Almaty, Kazakhstan; ATP 250; Hard (i) – $1,075,160 – 28S/16Q/16D; Singles – Doubles	(India) Yuki Bhambri (United States) Ryan Seggerman; 7–6^{(7–3)}, 6–7^{(1–7)}, [10–2]	(Austria) Lucas Miedler (Austria) Neil Oberleitner	(Kazakhstan) Alexander Bublik (Greece) Stefanos Tsitsipas	(France) Térence Atmane; Karen Khachanov (France) Adrian Mannarino (Australia) James Duckworth
19 Oct	Grand Prix Auvergne-Rhône-Alpes; Lyon, France; ATP 250; Hard (i) – €757,320 – 28S/16Q/16D; Singles – Doubles	(Italy) Lorenzo Musetti; 6–3, 6–4	(United States) Taylor Fritz	(Italy) Flavio Cobolli (United States) Tommy Paul	(United States) Brandon Nakashima (France) Luca Van Assche (France) Corentin Moutet (Germany) Daniel Altmaier
19 Oct	Grand Prix Auvergne-Rhône-Alpes; Lyon, France; ATP 250; Hard (i) – €757,320 – 28S/16Q/16D; Singles – Doubles	(United Kingdom) Julian Cash (United Kingdom) Lloyd Glasspool; 4–6, 6–3, [10–8]	(France) Théo Arribagé (France) Albano Olivetti	(Italy) Flavio Cobolli (United States) Tommy Paul	(United States) Brandon Nakashima (France) Luca Van Assche (France) Corentin Moutet (Germany) Daniel Altmaier
19 Oct	European Open; Brussels, Belgium; ATP 250; Hard (i) – €723,435 – 28S/16Q/16D; Singles – Doubles	(Netherlands) Tallon Griekspoor; 4–6, 6–3, 6–4	(Germany) Jan-Lennard Struff	(France) Arthur Fils (Argentina) Francisco Cerúndolo	(United States) Alex Michelsen (Belgium) Zizou Bergs (France) Clément Chidekh (Czech Republic) Jiří Lehečka
19 Oct	European Open; Brussels, Belgium; ATP 250; Hard (i) – €723,435 – 28S/16Q/16D; Singles – Doubles	(Germany) Constantin Frantzen (United States) Robert Galloway; 6–7^{(4–7)}, 6–4, [10–8]	(France) Sadio Doumbia (Netherlands) Bart Stevens	(France) Arthur Fils (Argentina) Francisco Cerúndolo	(United States) Alex Michelsen (Belgium) Zizou Bergs (France) Clément Chidekh (Czech Republic) Jiří Lehečka
26 Oct	Swiss Indoors; Basel, Switzerland; ATP 500; Hard (i) – €2,584,155 – 32S/16Q/16D; Singles – Doubles	(Monaco) Valentin Vacherot; 2–6, 6–3, 6–3	(Czech Republic) Jiří Lehečka	(Germany) Jan-Lennard Struff (United States) Taylor Fritz	(Switzerland) Jérôme Kym (Portugal) Nuno Borges (Denmark) Holger Rune (France) Arthur Fils
26 Oct	Swiss Indoors; Basel, Switzerland; ATP 500; Hard (i) – €2,584,155 – 32S/16Q/16D; Singles – Doubles	(France) Théo Arribagé (France) Albano Olivetti; 7–6^{(8–6)}, 7–6^{(8–6)}	(Switzerland) Henry Bernet (Switzerland) Dominic Stricker	(Germany) Jan-Lennard Struff (United States) Taylor Fritz	(Switzerland) Jérôme Kym (Portugal) Nuno Borges (Denmark) Holger Rune (France) Arthur Fils
26 Oct	Vienna Open; Vienna, Austria; ATP 500; Hard (i) – €2,797,985 – 32S/16Q/16D; Singles – Doubles	(Spain) Carlos Alcaraz; 6–1, 6–4	(Australia) Alex de Minaur	(Germany) Alexander Zverev; Daniil Medvedev	(United Kingdom) Arthur Fery (Italy) Matteo Berrettini (France) Adrian Mannarino (United States) Tommy Paul
26 Oct	Vienna Open; Vienna, Austria; ATP 500; Hard (i) – €2,797,985 – 32S/16Q/16D; Singles – Doubles	(Austria) Lucas Miedler (Austria) Neil Oberleitner; 6–1, 7–5	(United States) Ryan Seggerman (United States) Learner Tien	(Germany) Alexander Zverev; Daniil Medvedev	(United Kingdom) Arthur Fery (Italy) Matteo Berrettini (France) Adrian Mannarino (United States) Tommy Paul

=== November ===
Week	Tournament	Champions	Runners-up	Semifinalists	Quarterfinalists
2 Nov	Paris Masters; Nanterre, France; ATP 1000; Hard (i) – €6,309,095 – 56S/28Q/32D; Singles – Doubles	(Spain) Carlos Alcaraz; 7–6^{(7–5)}, 7–5	(United States) Ben Shelton	(France) Luca Van Assche (Norway) Casper Ruud	(Australia) Rinky Hijikata (United States) Tommy Paul (Portugal) Nuno Borges (United States) Taylor Fritz
2 Nov	Paris Masters; Nanterre, France; ATP 1000; Hard (i) – €6,309,095 – 56S/28Q/32D; Singles – Doubles	(France) Quentin Halys (France) Pierre-Hugues Herbert; 7–6^{(7–3)}, 6–7^{(4–7)}, [10–8]	(United States) Christian Harrison (United Kingdom) Neal Skupski	(France) Luca Van Assche (Norway) Casper Ruud	(Australia) Rinky Hijikata (United States) Tommy Paul (Portugal) Nuno Borges (United States) Taylor Fritz
9 Nov	Stockholm Open; Stockholm, Sweden; ATP 250; Hard (i) – €723,435 – 28S/16Q/16D; Singles – Doubles	(United States) Taylor Fritz; 6–2, 4–6, 7–6^{(7–3)}	(Argentina) Thiago Agustín Tirante	(Italy) Lorenzo Musetti (Chile) Alejandro Tabilo	(Denmark) Holger Rune (France) Ugo Humbert (United States) Alex Michelsen (Kazakhstan) Alexander Shevchenko
9 Nov	Stockholm Open; Stockholm, Sweden; ATP 250; Hard (i) – €723,435 – 28S/16Q/16D; Singles – Doubles	(Sweden) Erik Grevelius (Sweden) Adam Heinonen; 6–3, 6–4	(Croatia) Nikola Mektić (France) Édouard Roger-Vasselin	(Italy) Lorenzo Musetti (Chile) Alejandro Tabilo	(Denmark) Holger Rune (France) Ugo Humbert (United States) Alex Michelsen (Kazakhstan) Alexander Shevchenko
16 Nov	ATP Finals; Turin, Italy; ATP Finals; Hard (i) – $15,750,000 – 8S/8D (RR); Singles – Doubles	(Spain) Carlos Alcaraz; 6–2, 7–6^{(9–7)}	(Germany) Alexander Zverev	Daniil Medvedev (United States) Ben Shelton	Round robin (France) Arthur Fils (Spain) Rafael Jódar (Italy) Flavio Cobolli (United States) Frances Tiafoe
16 Nov	ATP Finals; Turin, Italy; ATP Finals; Hard (i) – $15,750,000 – 8S/8D (RR); Singles – Doubles	(France) Théo Arribagé (France) Albano Olivetti; 3–6, 7–6^{(7–2)}, [10–6]	(El Salvador) Marcelo Arévalo (Croatia) Mate Pavić	Daniil Medvedev (United States) Ben Shelton	Round robin (France) Arthur Fils (Spain) Rafael Jódar (Italy) Flavio Cobolli (United States) Frances Tiafoe
23 Nov	Davis Cup Finals; Bologna, Italy; Hard (i) – $4,900,000 – 8 teams	vs			

=== December ===
Week	Tournament	Champions	Runners-up	Semifinalists	Quarterfinalists
9 Dec	Next Gen ATP Finals; Reggio Calabria, Italy; Next Gen ATP Finals; Hard (i) – $2,000,000; Singles			vs vs	Round Robin

== Statistical information ==
These tables present the number of singles (S), doubles (D), and mixed doubles (X) titles won by each player and each nation during the season, within all the tournament categories of the 2026 calendar: the Grand Slam tournaments, the ATP Finals, the ATP Masters 1000, the ATP 500 tournaments, and the ATP 250 tournaments. Players who were part of the winning teams in the United Cup (UC), Laver Cup (LC), and Davis Cup (DC) have been added at the end. The players/nations are sorted by:

1. Total number of titles (a doubles title won by two players representing the same nation counts as only one win for the nation);
2. Cumulated importance of those titles (one Grand Slam win equalling two Masters 1000 wins, one undefeated ATP Finals win equalling one-and-a-half Masters 1000 win, one Masters 1000 win equalling two 500 events wins, one 500 event win equalling two 250 events wins);
3. A singles > doubles > mixed doubles hierarchy;
4. Alphabetical order (by family names for players).

Key
Grand Slam
ATP Finals
ATP 1000
ATP 500
ATP 250
Team events

=== Titles won by player ===
Total	Player	Grand Slam			ATP Finals		ATP 1000			ATP 500		ATP 250		Total			Team Cup		
Total	Player	S	D	X	S	D	S	D	X	S	D	S	D	S	D	X	UC	LC	DC
**7**	Théo Arribagé (FRA)					●					● ● ●		● ● ●	0	7	0			
**7**	Albano Olivetti (FRA)					●					● ● ●		● ● ●	0	7	0			
**6**	Jannik Sinner (ITA)	●					●●●●●							6	0	0			
**6**	Carlos Alcaraz (ESP)	●			●		●			● ● ●				6	0	0		1	
**5**	Harri Heliövaara (FIN)		●					●			● ●		●	0	5	0			
**5**	Henry Patten (GBR)		●					●			● ●		●	0	5	0			
**5**	Ben Shelton (USA)						●			● ●		●	●	4	1	0			
**5**	Lucas Miedler (AUT)							●			●		● ● ●	0	5	0			
**4**	Andrea Vavassori (ITA)			●				● ●			●			0	3	1			
**4**	Orlando Luz (BRA)							● ●					● ●	0	4	0			
**4**	Rafael Matos (BRA)							● ●					● ●	0	4	0			
**4**	Julian Cash (GBR)										● ● ●		●	0	4	0			
**4**	Lloyd Glasspool (GBR)										● ● ●		●	0	4	0			
**4**	Daniil Medvedev (Note: As of 1 March 2022, the ATP announced that players from Russia and Belarus will not compete in tournaments under the name or flag of Russia or Belarus due to the Russian invasion of Ukraine.)									●		● ● ●		4	0	0			
**3**	Alexander Zverev (GER)	● ●									●			2	1	0		1	
**3**	Simone Bolelli (ITA)							● ●			●			0	3	0			
**3**	Neil Oberleitner (AUT)							●			●		●	0	3	0			
**3**	Alejandro Davidovich Fokina (ESP)						●					● ●		3	0	0			
**3**	Marc Polmans (AUS)												● ● ●	0	3	0			
**2**	Christian Harrison (USA)		● ●											0	2	0			
**2**	Neal Skupski (GBR)		● ●											0	2	0			
**2**	Marcelo Arévalo (ESA)			●							●			0	1	1			
**2**	Jakub Menšík (CZE)			●								●		1	0	1		1	
**2**	Arthur Fils (FRA)						●			●				2	0	0			
**2**	Kevin Krawietz (GER)							●			●			0	2	0			
**2**	Tim Pütz (GER)							●			●			0	2	0			
**2**	Flavio Cobolli (ITA)								●	●				1	0	1		1	
**2**	Quentin Halys (FRA)							●				●		1	1	0			
**2**	Marcelo Melo (BRA)										● ●			0	2	0			
**2**	Ignacio Buse (PER)									●		●		2	0	0			
**2**	Francisco Cerúndolo (ARG)									●		●		2	0	0			
**2**	Taylor Fritz (USA)									●		●		2	0	0			
**2**	Austin Krajicek (USA)										●		●	0	2	0			
**2**	Nikola Mektić (CRO)										●		●	0	2	0			
**2**	Lorenzo Musetti (ITA)											●	●	1	1	0			
**2**	Francisco Cabral (POR)												● ●	0	2	0			
**2**	Sadio Doumbia (FRA)												● ●	0	2	0			
**2**	Fabien Reboul (FRA)												● ●	0	2	0			
**2**	Ryan Seggerman (USA)												● ●	0	2	0			
**2**	JJ Tracy (USA)												● ●	0	2	0			
**1**	Marcel Granollers (ESP)		●											0	1	0			
**1**	Horacio Zeballos (ARG)		●											0	1	0			
**1**	John Peers (AUS)			●										0	0	1			
**1**	Guido Andreozzi (ARG)							●						0	1	0			
**1**	Manuel Guinard (FRA)							●						0	1	0			
**1**	Pierre-Hugues Herbert (FRA)							●						0	1	0			
**1**	Alex de Minaur (AUS)									●				1	0	0			
**1**	Novak Djokovic (SRB)									●				1	0	0			
**1**	Tomás Martín Etcheverry (ARG)									●				1	0	0			
**1**	Frances Tiafoe (USA)									●				1	0	0			
**1**	Valentin Vacherot (MON)									●				1	0	0			
**1**	João Fonseca (BRA)										●			0	1	0			
**1**	Mate Pavić (CRO)										●			0	1	0			
**1**	Jakob Schnaitter (GER)										●			0	1	0			
**1**	Mark Wallner (GER)										●			0	1	0			
**1**	Félix Auger-Aliassime (CAN)											●		1	0	0			
**1**	Zizou Bergs (BEL)											●		1	0	0			
**1**	Alexander Bublik (KAZ)											●		1	0	0			
**1**	Luciano Darderi (ITA)											●		1	0	0			
**1**	Arthur Géa (FRA)											●		1	0	0			
**1**	Tallon Griekspoor (NED)											●		1	0	0			
**1**	Rafael Jódar (ESP)											●		1	0	0		1	
**1**	Sebastian Korda (USA)											●		1	0	0			
**1**	Tomáš Macháč (CZE)											●		1	0	0			
**1**	Kamil Majchrzak (POL)											●		1	0	0			
**1**	Daniel Mérida (ESP)											●		1	0	0			
**1**	Mariano Navone (ARG)											●		1	0	0			
**1**	Tommy Paul (USA)											●		1	0	0			
**1**	Andrey Rublev (Note: As of 1 March 2022, the ATP announced that players from Russia and Belarus will not compete in tournaments under the name or flag of Russia or Belarus due to the Russian invasion of Ukraine.)											●		1	0	0			
**1**	Learner Tien (USA)											●		1	0	0			
**1**	Stefanos Tsitsipas (GRE)											●		1	0	0			
**1**	Luca Van Assche (FRA)											●		1	0	0			
**1**	Andy Andrade (ECU)												●	0	1	0			
**1**	Sander Arends (NED)												●	0	1	0			
**1**	Romain Arneodo (MON)												●	0	1	0			
**1**	Yuki Bhambri (IND)												●	0	1	0			
**1**	Robert Cash (USA)												●	0	1	0			
**1**	Titouan Droguet (FRA)												●	0	1	0			
**1**	Constantin Frantzen (GER)												●	0	1	0			
**1**	Robert Galloway (USA)												●	0	1	0			
**1**	Erik Grevelius (SWE)												●	0	1	0			
**1**	Yannick Hanfmann (GER)												●	0	1	0			
**1**	Adam Heinonen (SWE)												●	0	1	0			
**1**	Kyrian Jacquet (FRA)												●	0	1	0			
**1**	Luke Johnson (GBR)												●	0	1	0			
**1**	Petr Nouza (CZE)												●	0	1	0			
**1**	Hugo Nys (MON)												●	0	1	0			
**1**	Adam Pavlásek (CZE)												●	0	1	0			
**1**	David Pel (NED)												●	0	1	0			
**1**	Patrik Rikl (CZE)												●	0	1	0			
**1**	Édouard Roger-Vasselin (FRA)												●	0	1	0			
**1**	Lorenzo Sonego (ITA)												●	0	1	0			
**1**	Jan-Lennard Struff (GER)												●	0	1	0			
**1**	Patrik Trhac (USA)												●	0	1	0			
**1**	Jan Zieliński (POL)												●	0	1	0	**1**		
-	Hubert Hurkacz (POL)													0	0	0	**1**		
-	Casper Ruud (NOR)													0	0	0		1	

=== Titles won by nation ===
Total	Nation	Grand Slam			ATP Finals		ATP 1000			ATP 500		ATP 250		Total		
Total	Nation	S	D	X	S	D	S	D	X	S	D	S	D	S	D	X
20	United States (USA)		2				1			4	1	5	7	10	10	0
18	France (FRA)					1	1	2		1	3	3	7	5	13	0
15	Italy (ITA)	1		1			5	2	1	1	1	2	1	9	4	2
12	Great Britain (GBR)		3					1			5		3	0	12	0
12	Spain (ESP)	1	1		1		2			3		4		11	1	0
8	Germany (GER)	2						1			3		2	2	6	0
6	Argentina (ARG)		1					1		2		2		4	2	0
6	Brazil (BRA)							2			2		2	0	6	0
6	Austria (AUT)							1			1		4	0	6	0
5	Finland (FIN)		1					1			2		1	0	5	0
5	Australia (AUS)			1						1			3	1	3	1
5	Czech Republic (CZE)			1								2	2	2	2	1
3	Croatia (CRO)										2		1	0	3	0
3	Monaco (MON)									1			2	1	2	0
2	El Salvador (ESA)			1							1			0	1	1
2	Peru (PER)									1		1		2	0	0
2	Netherlands (NED)											1	1	1	1	0
2	Poland (POL)											1	1	1	1	0
2	Portugal (POR)												2	0	2	0
1	Serbia (SRB)									1				1	0	0
1	Belgium (BEL)											1		1	0	0
1	Canada (CAN)											1		1	0	0
1	Greece (GRE)											1		1	0	0
1	Kazakhstan (KAZ)											1		1	0	0
1	Ecuador (ECU)												1	0	1	0
1	India (IND)												1	0	1	0
1	Sweden (SWE)												1	0	1	0

=== Titles information ===
The following players won their first main circuit title in singles, doubles, or mixed doubles:

Singles

- (Argentina) Tomás Martín Etcheverry (26 years, 7 months and 4 days) – Rio de Janeiro (draw)
- (Spain) Rafael Jódar (19 years, 6 months and 19 days) – Marrakesh (draw)
- (Argentina) Mariano Navone (25 years, 1 month and 9 days) – Bucharest (draw)
- (Peru) Ignacio Buse (22 years, 1 month and 28 days) – Hamburg (draw)
- (Poland) Kamil Majchrzak (30 years, 5 months and 1 day) – 's-Hertogenbosch (draw)
- (Spain) Alejandro Davidovich Fokina (27 years and 22 days) – Mallorca (draw)
- (Belgium) Zizou Bergs (27 years and 25 days) – Eastbourne (draw)
- (Spain) Daniel Mérida (21 years, 9 months and 24 days) – Umag (draw)
- (France) Quentin Halys (29 years, 8 months and 29 days) – Kitzbühel (draw)
- (France) Luca Van Assche (22 years, 2 months and 15 days) – Estoril (draw)
- (France) Arthur Géa (21 years, 6 months and 30 days) – Los Cabos (draw)

Doubles

- (Italy) Lorenzo Musetti (23 years, 10 months and 8 days) – Hong Kong (draw)
- (Brazil) João Fonseca (19 years, 6 months and 1 day) – Rio de Janeiro (draw)
- (Ecuador) Andy Andrade (27 years, 3 months and 22 days) – Houston (draw)
- (United States) Ben Shelton (23 years, 5 months and 27 days) – Houston (draw)
- (Germany) Jakob Schnaitter (30 years, 1 month and 12 days) – Munich (draw)
- (Germany) Mark Wallner (26 years, 8 months and 30 days) – Munich (draw)
- (Australia) Marc Polmans (29 years and 21 days) – Geneva (draw)
- (Germany) Yannick Hanfmann (34 years, 7 months and 1 day) – Stuttgart (draw)
- (Czech Republic) Adam Pavlásek (31 years, 9 months and 9 days) – Umag (draw)
- (France) Titouan Droguet (25 years, 1 month and 11 days) – Estoril (draw)
- (France) Kyrian Jacquet (25 years, 2 months and 15 days) – Estoril (draw)
- (United States) Ryan Seggerman (26 years, 11 months and 26 days) – Los Cabos (draw)
- (United States) Patrik Trhac (27 years, 9 months and 1 day) – Los Cabos (draw)
- (Austria) Neil Oberleitner (27 years and 24 days) – Winston-Salem (draw)
- (Sweden) Erik Grevelius (26 years, 4 months and 21 days) – Stockholm (draw)
- (Sweden) Adam Heinonen (24 years, 2 months and 23 days) – Stockholm (draw)

Mixed

- (Italy) Flavio Cobolli (23 years, 10 months and 8 days) – Indian Wells (draw)
- (El Salvador) Marcelo Arévalo (35 years, 8 months and 22 days) – **Wimbledon** (draw)
- (Czech Republic) Jakub Menšík (20 years, 11 months and 25 days) – **US Open** (draw)

The following players defended a main circuit title in singles, doubles, or mixed doubles:

Singles

- (Canada) Félix Auger-Aliassime – Montpellier (draw)
- (Italy) Jannik Sinner – **Wimbledon** (draw)
- (United States) Ben Shelton – Montreal (draw)
- (Spain) Carlos Alcaraz – Tokyo (draw)
- Daniil Medvedev – Almaty (draw)

Doubles

- (Italy) Simone Bolelli – Rotterdam (draw)
- (Italy) Andrea Vavassori – Rotterdam (draw)
- (Brazil) Marcelo Melo – Rio de Janeiro (draw)
- (Spain) Marcel Granollers – **French Open** (draw)
- (Argentina) Horacio Zeballos – **French Open** (draw)
- (Austria) Lucas Miedler – Gstaad (draw)
- (Portugal) Francisco Cabral – Hangzhou (draw)

Mixed

- (Australia) John Peers – **Australian Open** (draw)
- (Italy) Andrea Vavassori – **French Open** (draw)

=== Best ranking ===
The following players achieved their career-high ranking in this season inside top 50 (in bold the players who entered the top 10 or became the world No. 1 for the first time): (Note: Name and ranking in bold means the player entered the top 10 or became world No. 1 for the first time this year, and only the ranking in bold means the player had entered the top 10 in a previous season (before 2024) but reached a new career-high ranking this year.)

Singles

- (Germany) Daniel Altmaier (reached place No. 44 on January 5)
- (Italy) Lorenzo Musetti (reached place **No. 5** on January 12)
- (Kazakhstan) **Alexander Bublik** (reached place **No. 10** on January 12)
- (Czech Republic) Jakub Menšík (reached place No. 12 on March 2)
- (France) Térence Atmane (reached place No. 41 on April 13)
- (France) Arthur Rinderknech (reached place No. 24 on May 4)
- (Italy) Luciano Darderi (reached place No. 16 on May 18)
- (Argentina) Tomás Martín Etcheverry (reached place No. 25 on May 18)
- (Czech Republic) Jiří Lehečka (reached place No. 12 on May 25)
- (Canada) Félix Auger-Aliassime (reached place **No. 4** on June 8)
- (Argentina) Juan Manuel Cerúndolo (reached place No. 42 on June 29)
- (Poland) Kamil Majchrzak (reached place No. 45 on June 29)
- (Australia) Alex de Minaur (reached place **No. 5** on July 13)
- (Belgium) Raphaël Collignon (reached place No. 37 on July 20)
- (United States) Ethan Quinn (reached place No. 45 on July 20)
- (United States) Learner Tien (reached place No. 12 on August 10)
- (Belgium) Zizou Bergs (reached place No. 33 on August 10)
- (Italy) **Flavio Cobolli** (reached place **No. 6** on August 24)
- (Spain) Daniel Mérida (reached place No. 39 on August 24)
- (Argentina) Thiago Agustín Tirante (reached place No. 42 on August 24)
- (Peru) Ignacio Buse (reached place No. 30 on August 31)
- (United States) Ben Shelton (reached place **No. 4** on September 14)
- (United States) Frances Tiafoe (reached place **No. 8** on September 14)
- (United States) Brandon Nakashima (reached place No. 16 on September 14)
- (Belgium) Alexander Blockx (reached place No. 27 on September 14)
- (Monaco) Valentin Vacherot (reached place No. 14 on October 5)
- (Spain) Alejandro Davidovich Fokina (reached place No. 13 on October 19)
- (France) Arthur Géa (reached place No. 44 on October 19)
- (France) Quentin Halys (reached place No. 45 on October 26)
- (Germany) **Alexander Zverev** (reached place **No. 1** on November 2)
- (France) **Arthur Fils** (reached place **No. 7** on November 2)
- (Spain) **Rafael Jódar** (reached place **No. 10** on November 2)
- (United Kingdom) Arthur Fery (reached place No. 32 on November 2)
- (France) Luca Van Assche (reached place No. 34 on November 9)

Doubles

- (Brazil) Fernando Romboli (reached place No. 39 on January 5)
- (Portugal) Francisco Cabral (reached place No. 19 on January 12)
- (United States) Evan King (reached place No. 14 on February 2)
- (Australia) John-Patrick Smith (reached place No. 39 on February 2)
- (India) Yuki Bhambri (reached place No. 18 on February 9)
- (United Kingdom) Luke Johnson (reached place No. 25 on March 2)
- (Austria) Alexander Erler (reached place No. 29 on April 13)
- (France) Sadio Doumbia (reached place No. 21 on May 4)
- (Finland) **Harri Heliövaara** (reached place **No. 1** on June 8)
- (United Kingdom) **Henry Patten** (reached place **No. 1** on June 8)
- (United States) JJ Tracy (reached place No. 25 on June 8)
- (Netherlands) David Pel (reached place No. 21 on June 22)
- (United States) Robert Cash (reached place No. 32 on June 22)
- (Czech Republic) Patrik Rikl (reached place No. 29 on July 20)
- (Australia) Marc Polmans (reached place No. 21 on July 27)
- (France) Fabien Reboul (reached place No. 20 on August 3)
- (Germany) Jakob Schnaitter (reached place No. 31 on August 3)
- (Germany) Mark Wallner (reached place No. 31 on August 3)
- (Netherlands) Bart Stevens (reached place No. 48 on August 10)
- (United States) Vasil Kirkov (reached place No. 49 on August 10)
- (Brazil) Orlando Luz (reached place No. 13 on August 24)
- (Germany) Constantin Frantzen (reached place No. 29 on August 24)
- (France) Manuel Guinard (reached place No. 13 on September 14)
- (Argentina) Guido Andreozzi (reached place No. 14 on September 14)
- (India) Sriram Balaji (reached place No. 49 on September 14)
- (Czech Republic) Petr Nouza (reached place No. 35 on September 28)
- (Brazil) Rafael Matos (reached place No. 15 on October 19)
- (France) Albano Olivetti (reached place No. 13 on November 2)
- (France) Théo Arribagé (reached place No. 14 on November 2)
- (United States) Ryan Seggerman (reached place No. 45 on November 2)
- (Austria) Neil Oberleitner (reached place No. 13 on November 9)
- (Austria) Lucas Miedler (reached place No. 16 on November 9)
- (France) Quentin Halys (reached place No. 37 on November 9)
- (United States) **Christian Harrison** (reached place **No. 3** on November 16)

== ATP rankings ==
=== Singles ===
Singles race rankings as of 9 November 2026
No.	Player	Points	Tourn
1	Alexander Zverev (GER) ✓	9,350	19
2	Jannik Sinner (ITA) No	7,950	9
3	Carlos Alcaraz (ESP) ✓	6,100	11
4	Ben Shelton (USA) ✓	5,170	21
5	Daniil Medvedev ✓	3,820	24
6	Flavio Cobolli (ITA) ✓	3,680	24
7	Arthur Fils (FRA) ✓	3,625	18
8	Frances Tiafoe (USA) ✓	3,390	22
9	Rafael Jódar (ESP) ✓	3,234	21
10	Alex de Minaur (AUS)	3,170	23
11	Taylor Fritz (USA)	3,050	20
12	Novak Djokovic (SRB)	2,940	11
13	Tommy Paul (USA)	2,925	23
14	Jiří Lehečka (CZE)	2,540	22
15	Jakub Menšík (CZE)	2,450	20
16	Félix Auger-Aliassime (CAN)	2,440	18
17	Casper Ruud (NOR)	2,435	19
18	Alejandro Davidovich Fokina (ESP)	2,400	19
19	Brandon Nakashima (USA)	2,360	23
20	Francisco Cerúndolo (ARG)	2,220	25

✓ Qualified for the 2026 ATP Finals.

[ · ]

ATP rankings (singles) as of 16 November 2026
No.	Player	Points	Move
1	Alexander Zverev (GER)	9,350	Steady
2	Jannik Sinner (ITA)	7,950	Steady
3	Carlos Alcaraz (ESP)	6,100	Steady
4	Ben Shelton (USA)	5,170	Steady
5	Daniil Medvedev	3,820	Steady
6	Flavio Cobolli (ITA)	3,680	Steady
7	Arthur Fils (FRA)	3,625	Steady
8	Frances Tiafoe (USA)	3,390	Steady
9	Taylor Fritz (USA)	3,300	▲1
10	Rafael Jódar (ESP)	3,234	▲1
11	Alex de Minaur (AUS)	3,170	▼2
12	Novak Djokovic (SRB)	2,940	Steady
13	Tommy Paul (USA)	2,925	Steady
14	Jiří Lehečka (CZE)	2,540	▲1
15	Jakub Menšík (CZE)	2,500	▲1
16	Alejandro Davidovich Fokina (ESP)	2,500	▲1
17	Félix Auger-Aliassime (CAN)	2,465	▼3
18	Casper Ruud (NOR)	2,435	Steady
19	Brandon Nakashima (USA)	2,360	Steady
20	Francisco Cerúndolo (ARG)	2,220	Steady

==== No. 1 ranking ====
Holder	Date gained	Date forfeited
Carlos Alcaraz (ESP)	Year end 2025	12 April 2026
Jannik Sinner (ITA)	13 April 2026	1 November 2026
Alexander Zverev (GER)	2 November 2026	Year end 2026

=== Doubles ===
Doubles race rankings as of 9 November 2026
No.	Team	Points	Tourn
1	Harri Heliövaara (FIN) ✓ Henry Patten (GBR) ✓	8,330	17
2	Christian Harrison (USA) ✓ Neal Skupski (GBR) ✓	6,760	22
3	Marcel Granollers (ESP) ✓ Horacio Zeballos (ARG) ✓	5,330	13
4	Marcelo Arévalo (ESA); Mate Pavić (CRO) ✓	5,045	20
5	Simone Bolelli (ITA); Andrea Vavassori (ITA) ✓	4,840	19
6	Théo Arribagé (FRA); Albano Olivetti (FRA) ✓	4,530	30
7	Kevin Krawietz (GER); Tim Pütz (GER) ✓	4,470	17
8	Orlando Luz (BRA); Rafael Matos (BRA) ✓	3,995	30
9	Guido Andreozzi (ARG); Manuel Guinard (FRA)	3,955	25
10	Julian Cash (GBR); Lloyd Glasspool (GBR)	3,820	25

✓ Qualified for the 2026 ATP Finals.

[ · ]

ATP rankings (doubles) as of 9 November 2026
No.	Player	Points	Move
1	Harri Heliövaara (FIN)	9,630	Steady
=	Henry Patten (GBR)	9,630	Steady
3	Neal Skupski (GBR)	7,490	Steady
4	Christian Harrison (USA)	6,580	Steady
5	Horacio Zeballos (ARG)	5,530	Steady
6	Marcel Granollers (ESP)	5,530	Steady
7	Andrea Vavassori (ITA)	5,450	Steady
8	Marcelo Arévalo (ESA)	5,200	Steady
9	Mate Pavić (CRO)	5,200	Steady
10	Simone Bolelli (ITA)	5,150	Steady
11	Kevin Krawietz (GER)	4,940	Steady
12	Tim Pütz (GER)	4,670	Steady
13	Neil Oberleitner (AUT)	3,975	▲6
14	Albano Olivetti (FRA)	3,880	▼1
15	Théo Arribagé (FRA)	3,880	▼1
16	Lucas Miedler (AUT)	3,750	▲4
17	Rafael Matos (BRA)	3,735	Steady
18	Orlando Luz (BRA)	3,735	Steady
19	Manuel Guinard (FRA)	3,730	▼4
20	Guido Andreozzi (ARG)	3,730	▼4

==== No. 1 ranking ====
Holder	Date gained	Date forfeited
Lloyd Glasspool (GBR)	Year end 2025	1 February 2026
Neal Skupski (GBR)	2 February 2026	29 March 2026
Horacio Zeballos (ARG)	30 March 2026	5 April 2026
Neal Skupski (GBR)	6 April 2026	19 April 2026
Horacio Zeballos (ARG)	20 April 2026	3 May 2026
Neal Skupski (GBR)	4 May 2026	7 June 2026
Harri Heliövaara (FIN); Henry Patten (GBR)	8 June 2026	Year end 2026

== Point distribution ==
Points are awarded as follows:

Category	W	F	SF	QF	R16	R32	R64	R128	Q	Q3	Q2	Q1
Grand Slam (128S)	2000	1300	800	400	200	100	50	10	30	16	8	0
Grand Slam (64D)	2000	1200	720	360	180	90	0	–	–	–	–	–
ATP Finals (8S/8D)	1500 (max); 1100 (min)	1000 (max); 600 (min)	600 (max); 200 (min)	200 for each round robin match win, +400 for a semifinal win, +500 for the final win.								
ATP 1000 (96S)	1000	650	400	200	100	50	30	10	20	–	10	0
ATP 1000 (56S)	1000	650	400	200	100	50	10	–	30	–	16	0
ATP 1000 (32D)	1000	600	360	180	90	0	–	–	–	–	–	–
ATP 500 (32S)	500	330	200	100	50	0	–	–	25	–	13	0
ATP 500 (16D)	500	300	180	90	0	–	–	–	45	–	25	0
ATP 250 (48S)	250	165	100	50	25	13	0	–	8	–	4	0
ATP 250 (32S/28S)	250	165	100	50	25	0	–	–	13	–	7	0
ATP 250 (16D)	250	150	90	45	0	–	–	–	–	–	–	–
United Cup	500 (max)	For details, see 2026 United Cup										

== Prize money leaders ==
Prize money in US$ as of 26 October 2026
No.	Player	Singles	Doubles	Year-to-date
1	(Germany) Alexander Zverev	$14,972,355	$203,994	$15,176,349
2	(Italy) Jannik Sinner	$11,589,515	$18,260	$11,607,775
3	(United States) Ben Shelton	$6,431,816	$76,524	$6,508,340
4	(Spain) Carlos Alcaraz	$5,645,174	$0	$5,645,174
5	(Italy) Flavio Cobolli	$4,590,979	$82,818	$4,673,797
6	(United States) Frances Tiafoe	$4,379,010	$9,755	$4,388,765
7	Daniil Medvedev	$4,235,006	$60,890	$4,295,896
8	(Serbia) Novak Djokovic	$3,959,526	$17,850	$3,977,376
9	(Australia) Alex de Minaur	$3,800,220	$34,425	$3,834,645
10	(France) Arthur Fils	$3,728,925	$0	$3,728,925

== Retirements ==
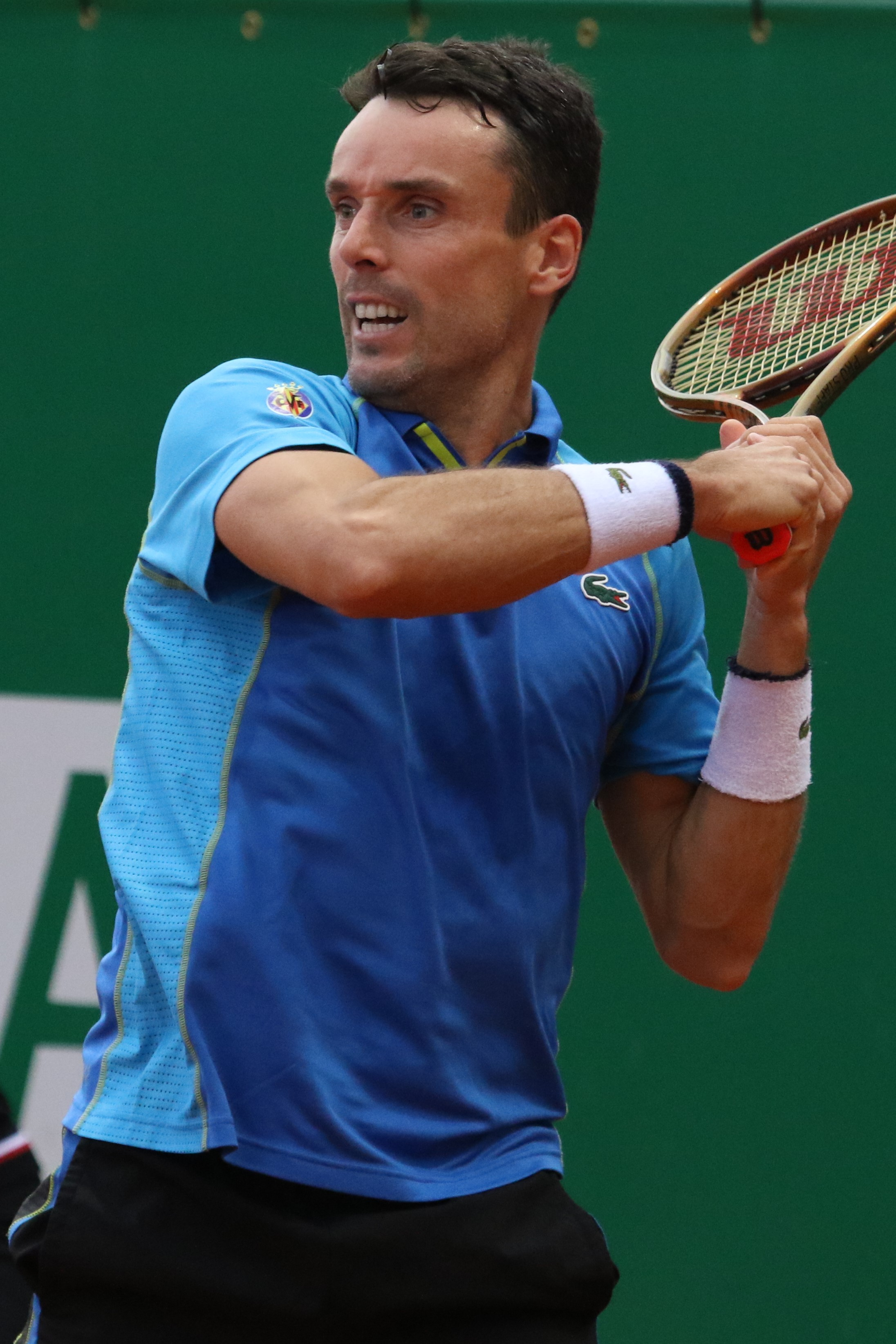
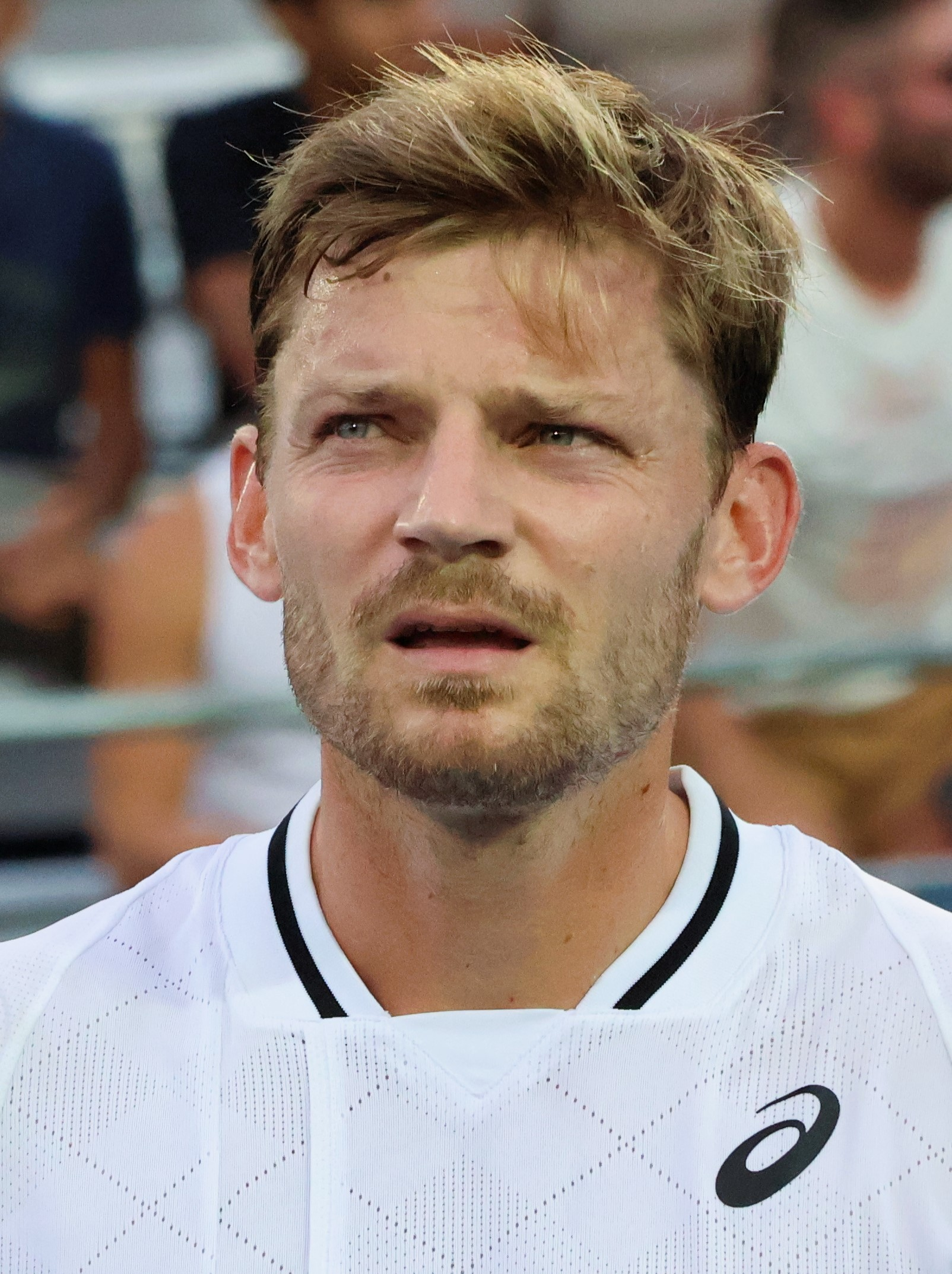
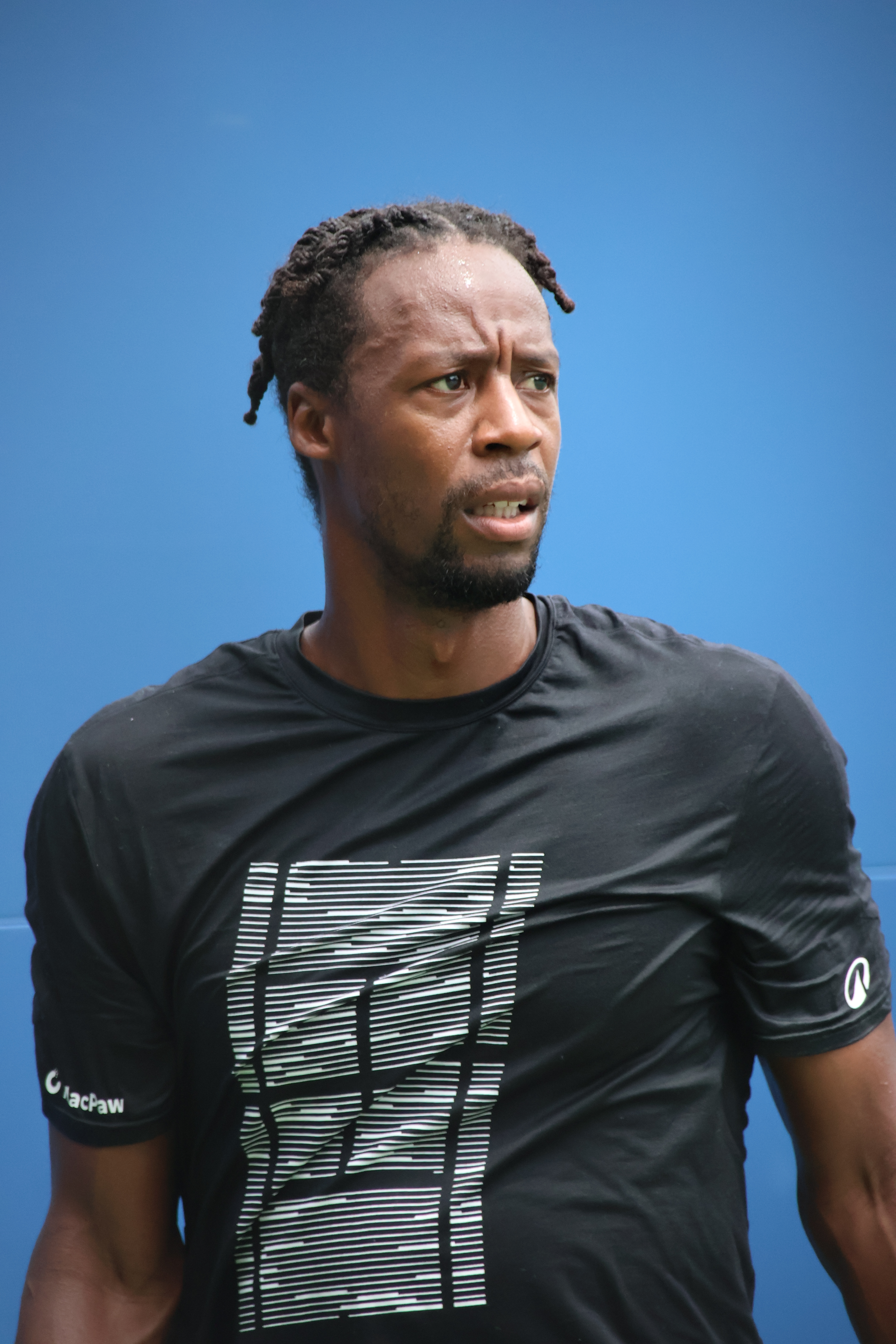
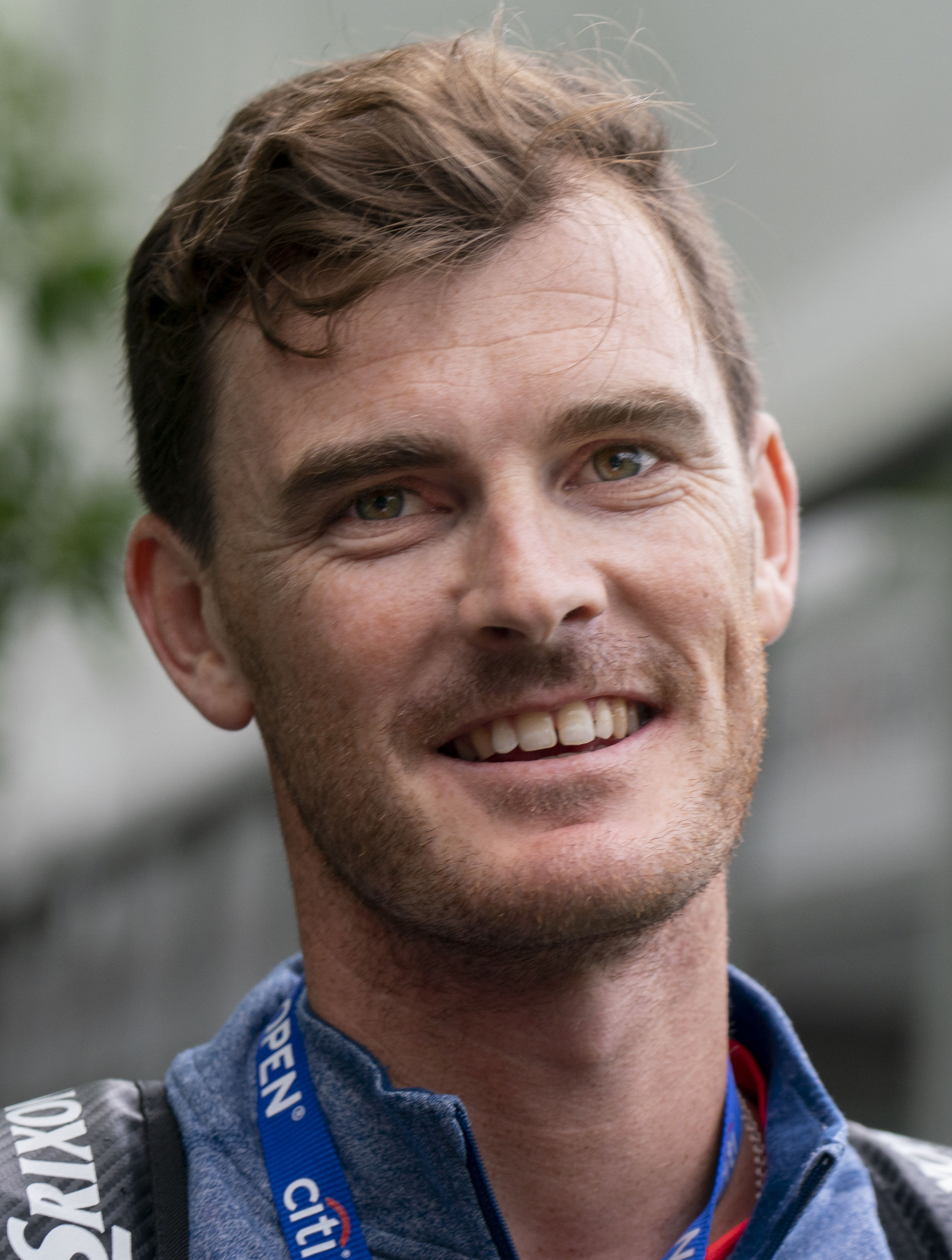
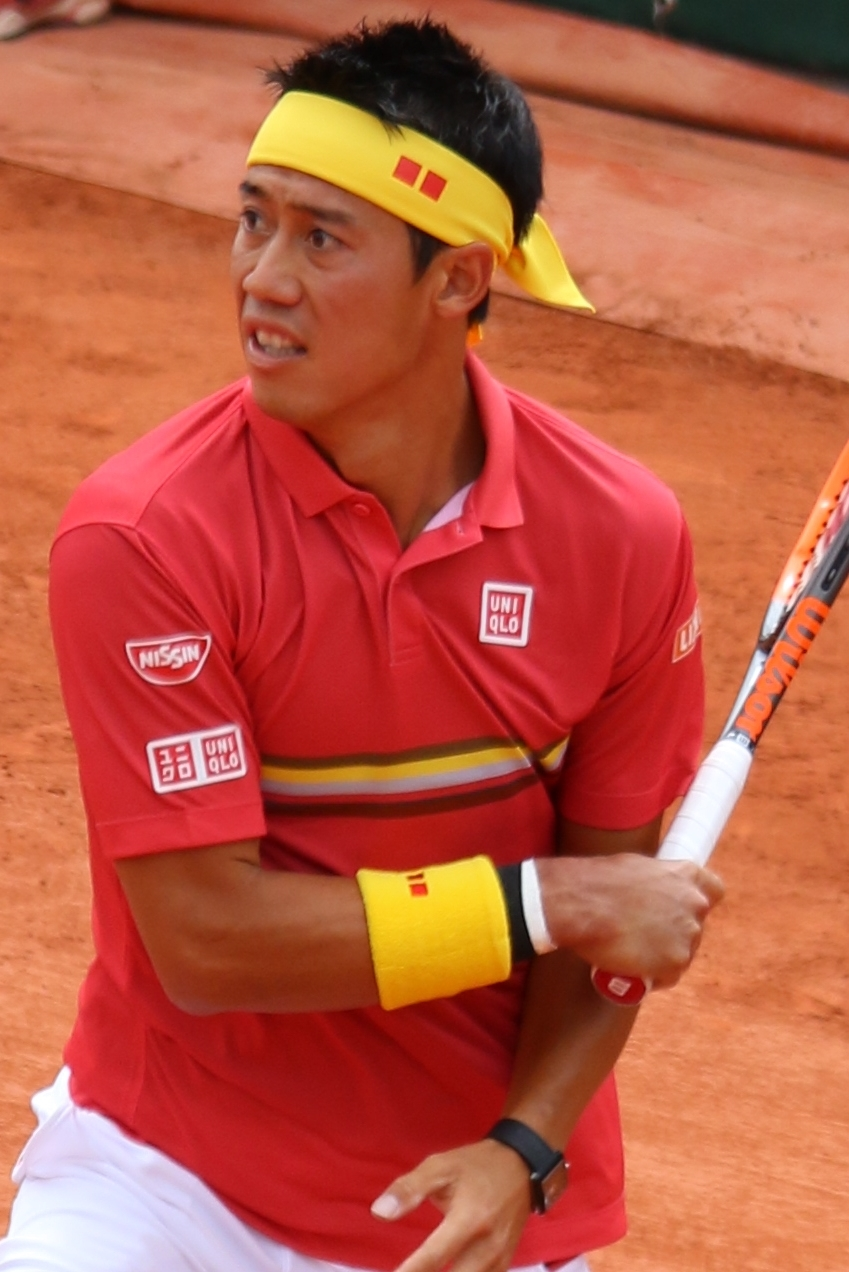
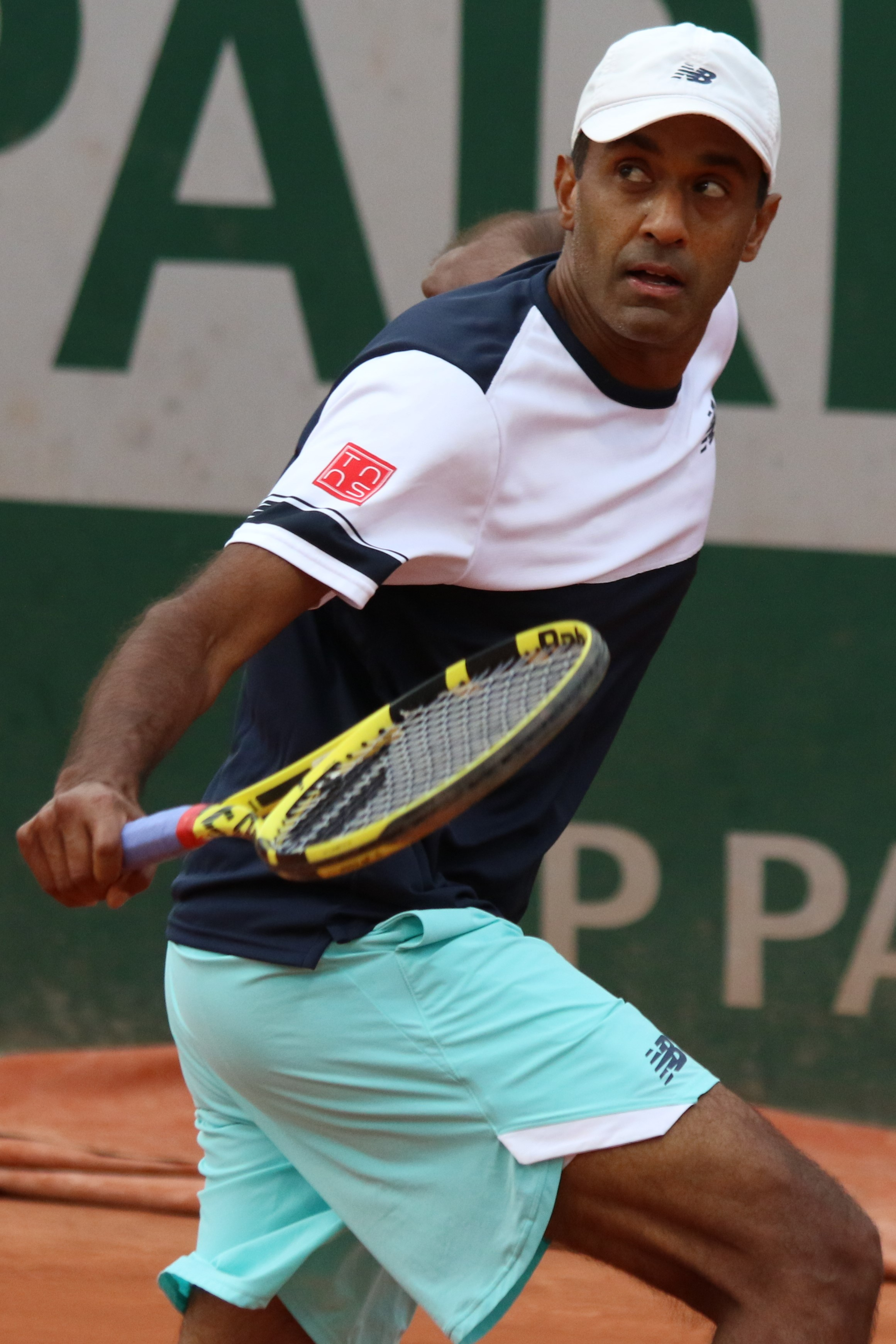
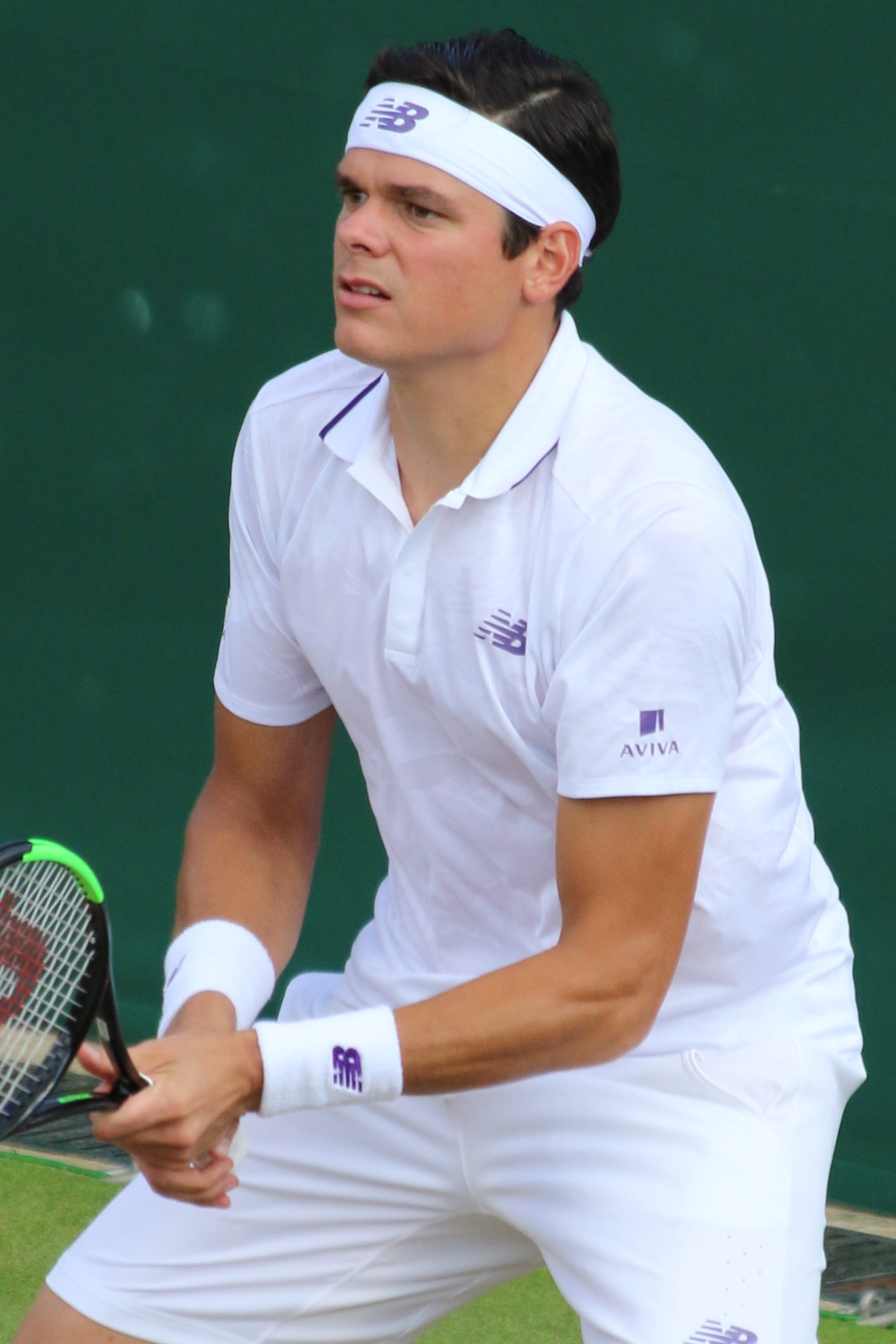
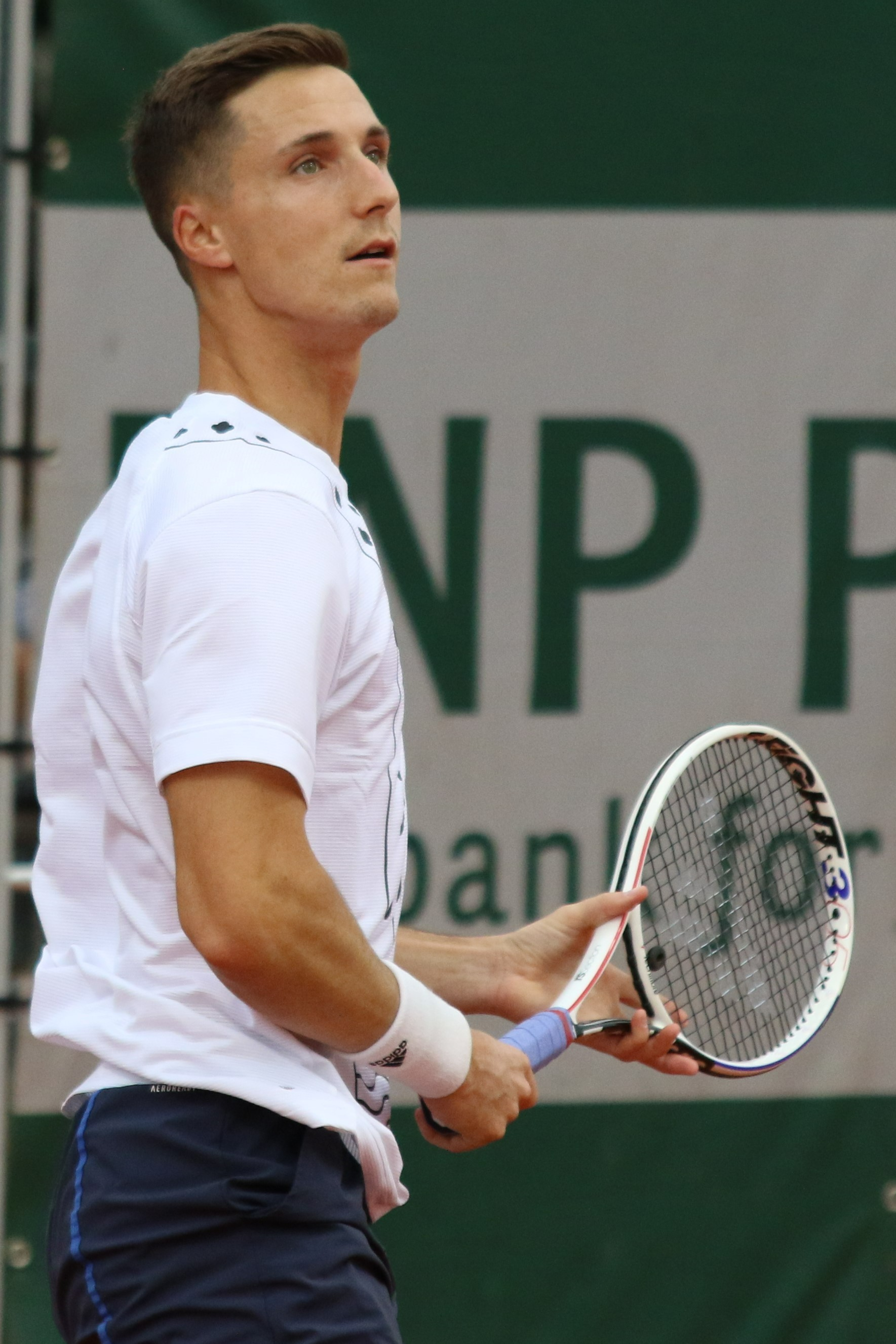
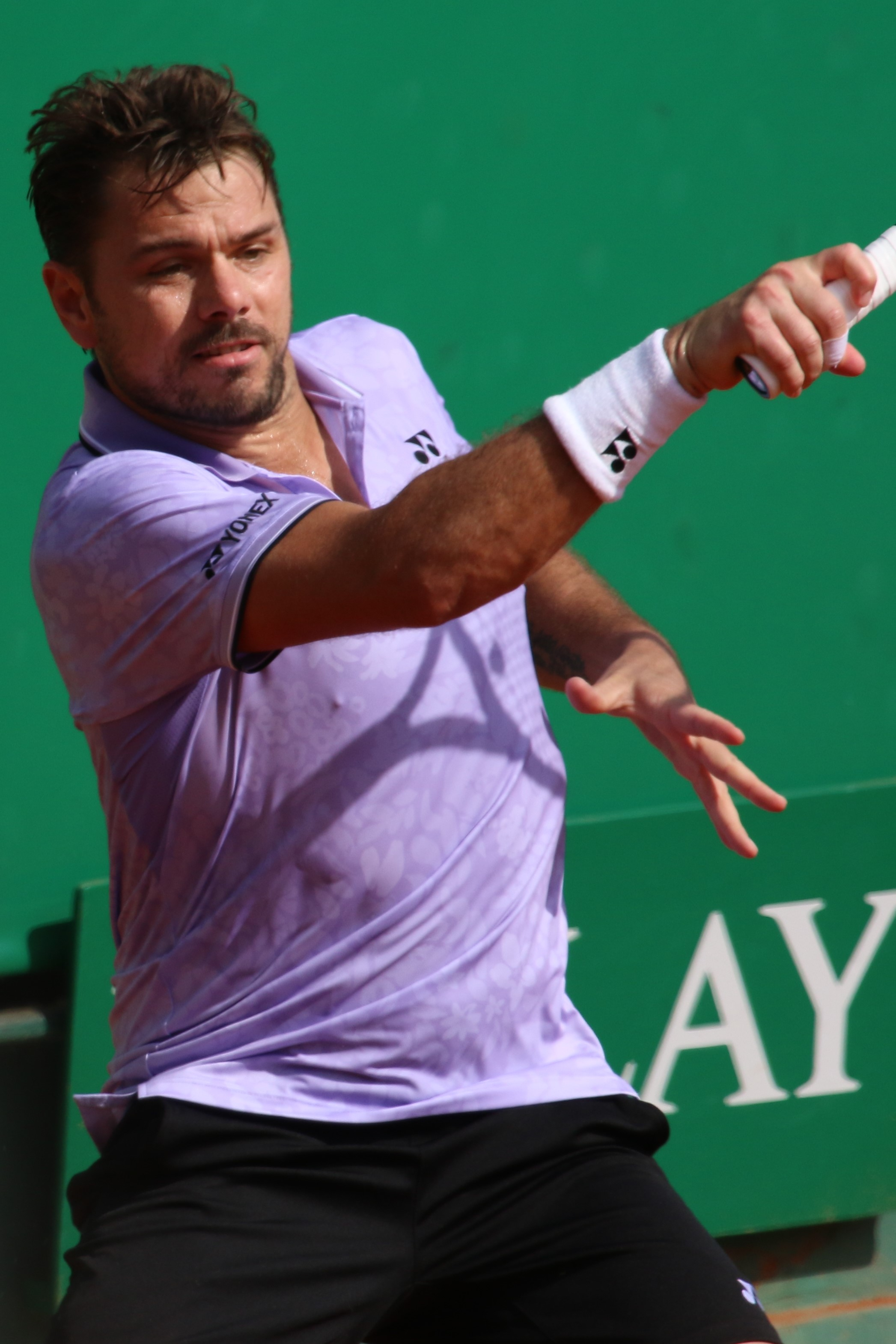
From left to right: Former top 10 players Roberto Bautista Agut, David Goffin, Gaël Monfils, Jamie Murray (former top 10 in doubles and former doubles world number 1), Kei Nishikori, Rajeev Ram (former top 10 in doubles and former doubles world number 1), Milos Raonic, Joe Salisbury (former top 10 in doubles and former doubles world number 1), and Stan Wawrinka announced their respective retirements during the 2026 season except for Murray and Raonic, they both played their last matches in 2025 and 2024, respectively.

The following is a list of notable players (winners of a main tour title, and/or part of the ATP rankings top 100 in singles, or top 100 in doubles, for at least one week) who announced their retirement from professional tennis, became inactive (after not playing for more than 52 weeks), or were banned from competition for a minimum of 12 months, during the 2026 season:

- (Spain) Roberto Bautista Agut joined the professional tour in 2005 and reached a career-high ranking of No. 9 in singles in November 2019. He won 12 career singles titles. On 16 April 2026, Bautista Agut announced he would retire from professional tennis at the end of the season. His final appearance was at the Copa del Rey de Tenis in July.
- (Bosnia and Herzegovina) Tomislav Brkić joined the professional tour in 2008 and reached a career-high ranking of No. 40 in doubles in January 2022. He won two career doubles titles. Brkić announced his retirement from professional tennis in June 2026.
- (Portugal) Gastão Elias joined the professional tour in 2008 and reached a career-high ranking of No. 57 in singles in October 2016. In August 2026, Elias announced his retirement from professional tennis at the end of the season. His final professional appearance was at the Lisboa Belém Open in October.
- (United Kingdom) Dan Evans joined the professional tour in 2006 and reached career-high rankings of No. 21 in singles in August 2023 and No. 52 in doubles in April 2021. He won two career singles titles. On 11 June 2026, Evans announced his retirement from professional tennis. He made his final professional appearance at Wimbledon.
- Egor Gerasimov joined the professional tour in 2010 and reached a career-high ranking of No. 64 in singles in November 2020. On 3 May 2026, Gerasimov announced his retirement from professional tennis in an Instagram post that was written in both Russian and English.
- (Belgium) David Goffin joined the professional tour in 2009 and reached a career-high ranking of No. 7 in singles in November 2017. He won six career singles titles, and was a finalist at the 2017 ATP Finals. On 26 March 2026, Goffin announced he would retire from professional tennis at the end of the season, after struggling with a long-term knee injury.
- (Switzerland) Marc-Andrea Hüsler joined the professional tour in 2016 and reached a career-high ranking of No. 47 in singles in February 2023. He won one career singles title at the 2022 Sofia Open, and one doubles title at the 2021 Swiss Open Gstaad, partnering compatriot Dominic Stricker. On his Instagram page, Hüsler announced his retirement from professional tennis on 17 July 2026. His last tournament was the Zug Open, where he finished as a finalist.
- (Kazakhstan) Mikhail Kukushkin joined the professional tour in 2006 and reached career-high rankings of No. 39 in singles in February 2019 and No. 67 in doubles in March 2020. He won one career singles title, at the 2010 St. Petersburg Open. On 9 June 2026, Kukushkin announced his retirement from professional tennis at the end of the season. His final professional appearance was at the Almaty Open.
- (France) Fabrice Martin joined the professional tour in 2006 and reached a career-high ranking of No. 19 in doubles in April 2023. He won 8 career doubles titles. In May 2026, Martin announced his retirement from professional tennis.
- (France) Gaël Monfils joined the professional tour in 2004 and reached a career-high ranking of No. 6 in singles in November 2016. He won 13 career singles titles. On 1 October 2025, Monfils announced that he would retire at the end of the season; this took effect from 5 October 2026 per his registration as a retired player with the ITIA. His final professional appearance was at the 2026 US Open.
- (United Kingdom) Jamie Murray joined the professional tour in 2004 and reached a career-high ranking of No. 1 in doubles in April 2016. He won 34 career doubles titles, including two major titles in men's doubles and five in mixed doubles. On 15 April 2026, Murray announced his retirement from professional tennis.
- Kei Nishikori joined the professional tour in 2007 and reached a career-high ranking of No. 4 in singles in March 2015, being the highest-ranked Japanese and Asian man in ATP history. He won 12 career singles titles, and was the first Japanese and Asian man to reach a major singles final in the Open Era, at the 2014 US Open. On 30 April 2026, Nishikori announced he will retire at the end of the season. His last tournament was the 2026 Japan Open in September.
- (United States) Rajeev Ram joined the professional tour in 2004 and reached career-high rankings of No. 56 in singles in April 2016 and No. 1 in doubles in October 2022. He won two career singles titles and 32 career doubles titles, including four major titles in men's doubles at the 2020 Australian Open and three consecutive US Open titles in 2021, 2022 and 2023, and two major titles in mixed doubles at the 2019 and 2021 Australian Opens, all won while partnering Joe Salisbury and Barbora Krejčíková respectively. Ram retired from professional tennis in September 2026, having made his final appearance at the 2026 US Open.
- (Canada) Milos Raonic joined the professional tour in 2008 and reached a career-high ranking of No. 3 in singles in 2016. He won eight singles titles, and was a finalist at the 2016 Wimbledon Championships. He announced his retirement on his social media pages on 11 January 2026, 18 months after his final match.
- (United Kingdom) Joe Salisbury joined the professional tour in 2014 and reached career-high rankings of No. 1 in doubles in April 2022. He won 17 career doubles titles, including four major titles in men's doubles at the 2020 Australian Open and three consecutive US Open titles in 2021, 2022 and 2023, and two major titles in mixed doubles at the 2021 French Open and 2021 US Open, all won while partnering Rajeev Ram and Desirae Krawczyk respectively. Salisbury retired from professional tennis in September 2026, having made his final appearance at the 2026 US Open.
- (Switzerland) Stan Wawrinka joined the professional tour in 2002 and reached a career-high ranking of No. 3 in singles in January 2014. He won sixteen career singles titles, including three major singles titles at the 2014 Australian Open, 2015 French Open and 2016 US Open, and a doubles gold medal at the 2008 Summer Olympics. On 19 December 2025, Wawrinka announced that he will retire at the end of the season.
- (Spain) Bernabé Zapata Miralles joined the professional tour in 2015 and reached a career-high ranking of No. 37 in singles in May 2023. Zapata Miralles announced his retirement from professional tennis in December 2025, citing struggles with his mental health. His final tournament was the 2026 Copa Faulconbridge in May.

=== Inactivity ===
- (United States) James Cerretani became inactive having not played for more than a year.
- (Croatia) Borna Ćorić became inactive having not played for more than a year.
- (Argentina) Guillermo Durán became inactive having not played for more than a year.
- (France) Antoine Hoang became inactive having not played for more than a year.
- (Germany) Dominik Koepfer became inactive having not played for more than a year.
- (France) Constant Lestienne became inactive having not played for more than a year.
- (Spain) David Marrero became inactive after receiving a 31 month ITIA tour ban after breaching the wildcard rules.
- (Germany) Oscar Otte became inactive having not played for more than a year.
- (France) Lucas Pouille became inactive having not played for more than a year.
- (Finland) Emil Ruusuvuori became inactive having not played for more than a year.
- (Sweden) Mikael Ymer became inactive having not played for more than a year.

== Comebacks and appearances ==
- (Argentina) Facundo Bagnis returned to the tour at the at the 2026 Challenger Ciudad de Guayaquil after a year of inactivity, partnering Emilio Gómez in doubles.
- (Hungary) Attila Balázs returned for one ITF М25 event in Budapest, partnering Vincent Selmeczi in doubles.
- (Kazakhstan) Andrey Golubev returned to the tour at the Australian Open after being absent since 2023.
- (Ecuador) Emilio Gómez returned for one event at the 2026 Challenger Ciudad de Guayaquil, partnering Facundo Bagnis in doubles.
- Aslan Karatsev returned in April for one ITF М25 event in Egypt.
- (Slovenia) Blaž Kavčič returned for one event at the 2026 Kingston Open, partnering Max Purcell in doubles.
- (Germany) Philipp Kohlschreiber returned for one event at the 2026 Upper Austria Open, partnering Joel Schwärzler in doubles.
- Maximilian Marterer returned to the tour in July at the ITF tournament in Überlingen, Germany.
- (Kazakhstan) Aleksandr Nedovyesov returned to the tour at the Australian Open after a year of inactivity.
- (Australia) Max Purcell returned to the tour at the ITF M15 event in Tokyo, Japan, following the expiration of his doping suspension in June.
- (United States) J. J. Wolf returned to the tour at the ITF M15 event in Naples, Florida after a year of inactivity.

== See also ==
- 2026 WTA Tour
- 2026 ATP Challenger Tour
- 2026 ITF Men's World Tennis Tour
