= 2024 Hangzhou Challenger – Singles =

Singles
- 2024 Hangzhou Challenger

Final
- Champion: (Australia) James Duckworth
- Runner-up: (United States) Mackenzie McDonald
- Score: 2–6, 7–6^{(7–5)}, 6–4

Events
Singles	Doubles
Hangzhou Challenger	· 2025 →

This was the first edition of the tournament.

James Duckworth won the title after defeating Mackenzie McDonald 2–6, 7–6^{(7–5)}, 6–4 in the final.

== Seeds ==
1. (Australia) James Duckworth (champion)
2. (Australia) Rinky Hijikata (quarterfinals)
3. (Italy) Fabio Fognini (quarterfinals)
4. (France) Arthur Cazaux (quarterfinals)
5. (Australia) Adam Walton (quarterfinals)
6. (Canada) Gabriel Diallo (semifinals)
7. (United Kingdom) Billy Harris (second round)
8. (Chinese Taipei) Tseng Chun-hsin (semifinals)

== Draw ==
Key

- Q = Qualifier
- WC = Wild card
- LL = Lucky loser
- Alt = Alternate
- ITF = ITF entry
- PR = Protected ranking
- SR = Special ranking
- SE = Special exempt
- JE = Junior exempt
- JR = Junior Accelerator Programme entrant
- CO = College Accelerator Programme entrant
- NG = Next Gen Accelerator Program entrant
- w/o = Walkover
- r = Retired
- d = Defaulted

=== Finals ===
Semifinals
1	(Australia) James Duckworth	6	6
8	(Chinese Taipei) Tseng Chun-hsin	2	3
6	(Canada) Gabriel Diallo	6^{9}	3
(United States) Mackenzie McDonald	7^{11}	6

Final
1	(Australia) James Duckworth	2	7^{7}	6
(United States) Mackenzie McDonald	6	6^{5}	4

=== Top half ===
First round
1	(Australia) J Duckworth	7	6^{4}	7^{7}
(Japan) Y Uchiyama	5	7^{7}	6^{5}
(Ukraine) I Marchenko	7^{10}	4	4
Alt	(India) R Ramanathan	6^{8}	6	6
(United States) M Krueger	4	3
Alt	(China) F Sun	6	6
(France) U Blanchet	6	6^{6}	4
5	(Australia) A Walton	3	7^{8}	6
3/WC	(Italy) F Fognini	6	6
Q	(Chinese Taipei) R Ho	3	2
WC	(China) J Cui	6	6
(Japan) Y Shimizu	3	3
(Ukraine) Vadym Ursu	5	7^{7}	6
WC	(China) R Te	7	6^{1}	4
Q	(Japan) Y Takahashi	6	6^{1}	2
8	(Chinese Taipei) C-h Tseng	4	7^{7}	6

Second round
1	(Australia) J Duckworth	6	7
Alt	(India) R Ramanathan	4	5
Alt	(China) F Sun	3	4
5	(Australia) A Walton	6	6
3/WC	(Italy) F Fognini	6	7
WC	(China) J Cui	3	5
(Ukraine) V Ursu	1	6^{2}
8	(Chinese Taipei) C-h Tseng	6	7^{7}

Quarterfinals
1	(Australia) J Duckworth	6	6
5	(Australia) A Walton	4	4
3/WC	(Italy) F Fognini	6	4	1
8	(Chinese Taipei) C-h Tseng	4	6	6

Semifinals
1	(Australia) J Duckworth	6	6
8	(Chinese Taipei) C-h Tseng	2	3

=== Bottom half ===
First round
6	(Canada) G Diallo	6	6
(Australia) J McCabe	4	2
Q	(Thailand) K Samrej	6	6
Q	(Georgia (country)) A Bakshi	4	1
Q	P Bar Biryukov	6	3	6
(Kazakhstan) D Yevseyev	4	6	3
(Australia) A Bolt	2	4
4	(France) A Cazaux	6	6
7	(United Kingdom) B Harris	6	1	6
(Zimbabwe) B Lock	3	6	3
(Chinese Taipei) Y-h Hsu	2	4
(United States) M McDonald	6	6
(United States) Z Svajda	7	6
Q	(China) Zhang Tianhui	5	3
(China) Y Bai	1	7^{7}	6^{1}
2	(Australia) R Hijikata	6	6^{5}	7^{7}

Second round
6	(Canada) G Diallo	6	6
Q	(Thailand) K Samrej	3	2
Q	P Bar Biryukov	7^{7}	4	2
4	(France) A Cazaux	6^{3}	6	6
7	(United Kingdom) B Harris	0	1
(United States) M McDonald	6	6
(United States) Z Svajda	6	3	5
2	(Australia) R Hijikata	3	6	7

Quarterfinals
6	(Canada) G Diallo	2	6	6
4	(France) A Cazaux	6	4	4
(United States) M McDonald	6	6
2	(Australia) R Hijikata	2	1

Semifinals
6	(Canada) G Diallo	6^{9}	3
(United States) M McDonald	7^{11}	6
