= 2024 Rolex Shanghai Masters – Doubles =

Doubles
- 2024 Rolex Shanghai Masters

Final
- Champions: (Netherlands) Wesley Koolhof (Croatia) Nikola Mektić
- Runners-up: (Argentina) Máximo González (Argentina) Andrés Molteni
- Score: 6–4, 6–4

Details
- Draw: 32 (3 WC )
- Seeds: 8

Events
Singles	Doubles
← 2023 ·	Shanghai Masters	· 2025 →

Wesley Koolhof and Nikola Mektić defeated Máximo González and Andrés Molteni in the final, 6–4, 6–4 to win the doubles tennis title at the 2024 Shanghai Masters. It was the fifth ATP Masters 1000 doubles title for Koolhof and ninth for Mektić.

Marcel Granollers and Horacio Zeballos were the defending champions, but lost in the second round to Jamie Murray and John Peers.

Granollers and Zeballos retained the ATP No. 1 doubles ranking after Mate Pavić lost in the first round.

== Seeds ==
1. (Spain) Marcel Granollers / (Argentina) Horacio Zeballos (second round)
2. (El Salvador) Marcelo Arévalo / (Croatia) Mate Pavić (first round)
3. (Australia) Matthew Ebden / (United Kingdom) Joe Salisbury (first round)
4. (Italy) Simone Bolelli / (Italy) Andrea Vavassori (quarterfinals)
5. (India) Rohan Bopanna / (Croatia) Ivan Dodig (second round)
6. (Finland) Harri Heliövaara / (United Kingdom) Henry Patten (first round)
7. (United Kingdom) Neal Skupski / (New Zealand) Michael Venus (first round)
8. (United States) Austin Krajicek / (United States) Rajeev Ram (second round)

== Draw ==
=== Key ===
- Q = Qualifier
- WC = Wild card
- LL = Lucky loser
- Alt = Alternate
- ITF = ITF entry
- PR = Protected ranking
- SR = Special ranking
- SE = Special exempt
- JE = Junior exempt
- JR = Junior Accelerator Programme entrant
- CO = College Accelerator Programme entrant
- NG = Next Gen Accelerator Program entrant
- w/o = Walkover
- r = Retired
- d = Defaulted

=== Finals ===
Semifinals
(Czech Republic) Adam Pavlásek (Netherlands) Jean-Julien Rojer	6	5	[8]
(Argentina) Máximo González (Argentina) Andrés Molteni	4	7	[10]
(Mexico) Santiago González (France) Édouard Roger-Vasselin	7^{7}	4	[6]
(Netherlands) Wesley Koolhof (Croatia) Nikola Mektić	6^{3}	6	[10]

Final
(Argentina) Máximo González (Argentina) Andrés Molteni	4	4
(Netherlands) Wesley Koolhof (Croatia) Nikola Mektić	6	6

=== Top half ===
First round
1	(Spain) M Granollers (Argentina) H Zeballos	6	6
Alt	(Mexico) MÁ Reyes-Varela (Australia) J-P Smith	4	4
WC	(United Kingdom) J Murray (Australia) J Peers	6	6
(France) U Humbert (France) A Mannarino	2	0
(Italy) L Darderi (Chile) A Tabilo	7	4	[11]
Alt	(Greece) Pe Tsitsipas (Greece) S Tsitsipas	5	6	[9]
(Czech Republic) A Pavlásek (Netherlands) J-J Rojer	6	6
6	(Finland) H Heliövaara (United Kingdom) H Patten	4	2
4	(Italy) S Bolelli (Italy) A Vavassori	7^{7}	6^{5}	[10]
(Czech Republic) T Macháč (China) Z Zhang	6^{4}	7^{7}	[7]
(France) S Doumbia (France) F Reboul	6^{3}	4
WC	(China) A Wang (China) Y Zhou	7^{7}	6
(Argentina) M González (Argentina) A Molteni	7^{7}	4	[10]
(Monaco) H Nys (Poland) J Zieliński	6^{4}	6	6
K Khachanov; A Rublev	7	7
7	(United Kingdom) N Skupski (New Zealand) M Venus	5	5

Second round
1	(Spain) M Granollers (Argentina) H Zeballos	7^{8}	4	[6]
WC	(United Kingdom) J Murray (Australia) J Peers	6^{6}	6	[10]
(Italy) L Darderi (Chile) A Tabilo	6	3	[4]
(Czech Republic) A Pavlásek (Netherlands) J-J Rojer	3	6	[10]
4	(Italy) S Bolelli (Italy) A Vavassori	6	6
WC	(China) A Wang (China) Y Zhou	2	4
(Argentina) M González (Argentina) A Molteni	w/o
K Khachanov; A Rublev

Quarterfinals
WC	(United Kingdom) J Murray (Australia) J Peers	6^{2}	6	[5]
(Czech Republic) A Pavlásek (Netherlands) J-J Rojer	7^{7}	4	[10]
4	(Italy) S Bolelli (Italy) A Vavassori	4	4
(Argentina) M González (Argentina) A Molteni	6	6

Semifinals
(Czech Republic) A Pavlásek (Netherlands) J-J Rojer	6	5	[8]
(Argentina) M González (Argentina) A Molteni	4	7	[10]

=== Bottom half ===
First round
8	(United States) A Krajicek (United States) R Ram	4	6	[14]
(Brazil) R Matos (Brazil) M Melo	6	3	[12]
(Mexico) S González (France) É Roger-Vasselin	6	6
(Kazakhstan) A Bublik (United States) F Tiafoe	2	2
(Uruguay) A Behar (United States) R Galloway	6	6
WC	(China) F Sun (China) R Te	3	4
(United Kingdom) J Cash (United Kingdom) L Glasspool	7^{8}	7^{7}
3	(Australia) M Ebden (United Kingdom) J Salisbury	6^{6}	6^{3}
5	(India) R Bopanna (Croatia) I Dodig	6	6
PR	(Spain) P Carreño Busta (Spain) P Martínez	4	3
(Netherlands) W Koolhof (Croatia) N Mektić	6	3	[10]
(France) A Fils (United States) B Shelton	3	6	[4]
(United States) N Lammons (United States) J Withrow	6	6
(Argentina) F Cerúndolo (Argentina) TM Etcheverry	3	3
(Belgium) S Gillé (Belgium) J Vliegen	2	6	[10]
2	(El Salvador) M Arévalo (Croatia) M Pavić	6	3	[5]

Second round
8	(United States) A Krajicek (United States) R Ram	7^{7}	4	[7]
(Mexico) S González (France) É Roger-Vasselin	6^{2}	6	[10]
(Uruguay) A Behar (United States) R Galloway	7^{7}	6
(United Kingdom) J Cash (United Kingdom) L Glasspool	6^{5}	3
5	(India) R Bopanna (Croatia) I Dodig	6^{5}	6	[12]
(Netherlands) W Koolhof (Croatia) N Mektić	7^{7}	2	[14]
(United States) N Lammons (United States) J Withrow	6^{4}	6	[10]
(Belgium) S Gillé (Belgium) J Vliegen	7^{7}	4	[5]

Quarterfinals
(Mexico) S González (France) É Roger-Vasselin	6	6
(Uruguay) A Behar (United States) R Galloway	4	4
(Netherlands) W Koolhof (Croatia) N Mektić	6	6
(United States) N Lammons (United States) J Withrow	3	4

Semifinals
(Mexico) S González (France) É Roger-Vasselin	7^{7}	4	[6]
(Netherlands) W Koolhof (Croatia) N Mektić	6^{3}	6	[10]

== Seeded teams ==
The following are the seeded teams. Seedings are based on ATP rankings as of 23 September 2024.

Country	Player	Country	Player	Rank^{1}	Seed
ESP	Marcel Granollers	ARG	Horacio Zeballos	2	1
ESA	Marcelo Arévalo	CRO	Mate Pavić	7	2
AUS	Matthew Ebden	GBR	Joe Salisbury	16	3
ITA	Simone Bolelli	ITA	Andrea Vavassori	21	4
IND	Rohan Bopanna	CRO	Ivan Dodig	31	5
FIN	Harri Heliövaara	GBR	Henry Patten	32	6
GBR	Neal Skupski	NZL	Michael Venus	37	7
USA	Austin Krajicek	USA	Rajeev Ram	39	8

== Other entrants ==
=== Wildcards ===
- (United Kingdom) Jamie Murray / (Australia) John Peers
- (China) Sun Fajing / (China) Te Rigele
- (China) Wang Aoran / (China) Zhou Yi

=== Protected ranking ===
- (Spain) Pablo Carreño Busta / (Spain) Pedro Martínez

=== Alternates ===
- (Mexico) Miguel Ángel Reyes-Varela / (Australia) John-Patrick Smith
- (Greece) Petros Tsitsipas / (Greece) Stefanos Tsitsipas

=== Withdrawals ===
- (United States) Taylor Fritz / (Denmark) Holger Rune → replaced by (Greece) Petros Tsitsipas / (Greece) Stefanos Tsitsipas
- (Germany) Kevin Krawietz / (Germany) Tim Pütz → replaced by (Uruguay) Ariel Behar / (United States) Robert Galloway
- (Australia) Max Purcell / (Australia) Jordan Thompson → replaced by (Mexico) Miguel Ángel Reyes-Varela / (Australia) John-Patrick Smith
