= 2026 Hangzhou Open – Doubles =

Doubles
- 2026 Hangzhou Open

Final
- Champions: (Portugal) Francisco Cabral (United States) JJ Tracy
- Runners-up: (Netherlands) Sander Arends (Netherlands) David Pel
- Score: 7–5, 6–4

Details
- Draw: 16 (2WC)
- Seeds: 4

Events
| Singles | Doubles |
- Hangzhou Open

Francisco Cabral and JJ Tracy defeated Sander Arends and David Pel in the final, 7–5, 6–4 to win the doubles tennis title at the 2026 Hangzhou Open.

Cabral and Lucas Miedler were the reigning champions. Miedler partnered Quentin Halys, but lost in the quarterfinals to Jean-Julien Rojer and Theodore Winegar.

== Seeds ==
1. (France) Quentin Halys / (Austria) Lucas Miedler (quarterfinals)
2. (Czech Republic) Petr Nouza / (Austria) Neil Oberleitner (quarterfinals)
3. (Portugal) Francisco Cabral / (United States) JJ Tracy (champions)
4. (United States) Evan King / (Netherlands) Bart Stevens (semifinals)

== Draw ==
Key

- Q = Qualifier
- WC = Wild card
- LL = Lucky loser
- Alt = Alternate
- ITF = ITF entry
- PR = Protected ranking
- SR = Special ranking
- SE = Special exempt
- JE = Junior exempt
- JR = Junior Accelerator Programme entrant
- CO = College Accelerator Programme entrant
- NG = Next Gen Accelerator Program entrant
- w/o = Walkover
- r = Retired
- d = Defaulted

=== Draw ===
First round
1 | (France) Q Halys (Austria) L Miedler | 4 | 6 | [10]
(Hungary) F Marozsán (Czech Republic) P Rikl | 6 | 4 | [7]
(Netherlands) J-J Rojer (United States) T Winegar | 7^{7} | 6
(United States) N Lammons (United States) J Withrow | 6^{5} | 4
3 | (Portugal) F Cabral (United States) JJ Tracy | 7^{7} | 6
WC | (China) F Sun (China) Z Zhang | 6^{2} | 3
(Argentina) M González (Argentina) A Molteni | 6^{0} | 3
(Mexico) S González (Germany) H Jebens | 7^{7} | 6
(New Zealand) F Reynolds (New Zealand) J Watt | 6 | 6
(Belgium) S Gillé (Netherlands) S Verbeek | 3 | 4
WC | (China) J Cui (China) R Te | 4 | 5
4 | (United States) E King (Netherlands) B Stevens | 6 | 7
(Netherlands) S Arends (Netherlands) D Pel | 6 | 6
(Mexico) MÁ Reyes-Varela (United States) R Stalder | 4 | 4
I Liutarevich; R Safiullin | 4 | 7^{7} | [4]
2 | (Czech Republic) P Nouza (Austria) N Oberleitner | 6 | 6^{3} | [10]

Quarterfinals
1 | (France) Q Halys (Austria) L Miedler | 6^{3} | 6^{5}
(Netherlands) J-J Rojer (United States) T Winegar | 7^{7} | 7^{7}
3 | (Portugal) F Cabral (United States) JJ Tracy | 6 | 6
(Mexico) S González (Germany) H Jebens | 4 | 4
(New Zealand) F Reynolds (New Zealand) J Watt | 6^{4} | 3
4 | (United States) E King (Netherlands) B Stevens | 7^{7} | 6
(Netherlands) S Arends (Netherlands) D Pel | 6 | 3 | [10]
2 | (Czech Republic) P Nouza (Austria) N Oberleitner | 3 | 6 | [6]

Semifinals
(Netherlands) J-J Rojer (United States) T Winegar | 4 | 6^{3}
3 | (Portugal) F Cabral (United States) JJ Tracy | 6 | 7^{7}
4 | (United States) E King (Netherlands) B Stevens | 3 | 6^{4}
(Netherlands) S Arends (Netherlands) D Pel | 6 | 7^{7}

Final
3 | (Portugal) F Cabral (United States) JJ Tracy | 7 | 6
(Netherlands) S Arends (Netherlands) D Pel | 5 | 4
