= 2026 Hangzhou Open =

- Date: 23–29 September
- Edition: 3rd
- Category: ATP 250 tournaments
- Draw: 28S / 16D
- Surface: Hard / outdoor
- Location: Hangzhou, China
- Venue: Hangzhou Olympic Sports Expo Center

Champions

Singles
- Daniil Medvedev

Doubles
- (Portugal) Francisco Cabral / (United States) JJ Tracy
- Hangzhou Open

The 2026 AITO Hangzhou Open was a men's tennis tournament played on outdoor hardcourts. It was the third edition of the Hangzhou Open an ATP 250 tournament on the 2026 ATP Tour. It took place at the Hangzhou Olympic Sports Expo Center in Hangzhou, China, from 23 September until 29 September 2025.

== Champions ==
=== Singles ===
- Daniil Medvedev def. Andrey Rublev, 7–5, 6–4

=== Doubles ===
- (Portugal) Francisco Cabral / (United States) JJ Tracy def. (Netherlands) Sander Arends / (Netherlands) David Pel, 7–5, 6–4

== Singles main-draw entrants ==
=== Seeds ===
Country	Player	Rank^{1}	Seed
	Daniil Medvedev	6	1
	Andrey Rublev	25	2
ARG	Tomás Martín Etcheverry	30	3
FRA	Quentin Halys	49	4
PAR	Adolfo Daniel Vallejo	58	5
HUN	Fábián Marozsán	59	6
POR	Jaime Faria	68	7
POL	Kamil Majchrzak	73	8

- ^{1} Rankings are as of 21 September 2026

=== Other entrants ===
The following players received wildcards into the singles main draw:

- (China) Cui Jie
- (China) Zhang Zhizhen
- (United States) Michael Zheng

The following players received entry from the qualifying draw:

- (Australia) Alex Bolt
- (Japan) Taro Daniel
- (China) Sun Fajing
- (Czech Republic) Dalibor Svrčina

=== Withdrawals ===
- (Germany) Daniel Altmaier → replaced by (Australia) Adam Walton
- (Italy) Matteo Arnaldi → replaced by Roman Safiullin
- (Croatia) Marin Čilić → replaced by (China) Bu Yunchaokete
- Karen Khachanov → replaced by (France) Kyrian Jacquet
- (Australia) Thanasi Kokkinakis → replaced by (France) Térence Atmane
- (United States) Alex Michelsen → replaced by (Australia) Aleksandar Vukic
- (France) Corentin Moutet → replaced by (Hong Kong) Coleman Wong
- (France) Luca Van Assche → replaced by (Italy) Mattia Bellucci

== Doubles main-draw entrants ==
=== Seeds ===
Country	Player	Country	Player	Rank^{1}	Seed
FRA	Quentin Halys	AUT	Lucas Miedler	74	1
CZE	Petr Nouza	AUT	Neil Oberleitner	75	2
POR	Francisco Cabral	USA	JJ Tracy	78	3
USA	Evan King	NED	Bart Stevens	98	4

- ^{1} Rankings are as of 21 September 2026

=== Other entrants ===
The following pairs received wildcards into the doubles main draw:

- (China) Cui Jie / (China) Te Rigele
- (China) Sun Fajing / (China) Zhang Zhizhen
