= 2026 Hangzhou Open – Singles =

Singles
- 2026 Hangzhou Open

Final
- Champion: Daniil Medvedev
- Runner-up: Andrey Rublev
- Score: 7–5, 6–4

Details
- Draw: 28 (4Q / 3WC)
- Seeds: 8

Events
| Singles | Doubles |
- Hangzhou Open

Daniil Medvedev defeated Andrey Rublev in the final, 7–5, 6–4 to win the singles tennis title at the 2026 Hangzhou Open. It was his 24th ATP Tour title and 22nd on hardcourts.

Alexander Bublik was the reigning champion, but chose to compete at the Laver Cup instead.

== Seeds ==
The top four seeds received a bye into the second round.

1. Daniil Medvedev (champion)
2. Andrey Rublev (final)
3. (Argentina) Tomás Martín Etcheverry (second round)
4. (France) Quentin Halys (second round)
5. (Paraguay) Adolfo Daniel Vallejo (second round)
6. (Hungary) Fábián Marozsán (quarterfinals)
7. (Portugal) Jaime Faria (second round)
8. (Poland) Kamil Majchrzak (second round)

== Draw ==
Key

- Q = Qualifier
- WC = Wild card
- LL = Lucky loser
- Alt = Alternate
- ITF = ITF entry
- PR = Protected ranking
- SR = Special ranking
- SE = Special exempt
- JE = Junior exempt
- JR = Junior Accelerator Programme entrant
- CO = College Accelerator Programme entrant
- NG = Next Gen Accelerator Program entrant
- w/o = Walkover
- r = Retired
- d = Defaulted

=== Finals ===
Semifinals
1 | Daniil Medvedev | 7 | 6
Roman Safiullin | 5 | 4
(France) Kyrian Jacquet | 6^{0} | 1
2 | Andrey Rublev | 7^{7} | 6

Final
1 | Daniil Medvedev | 7 | 6
2 | Andrey Rublev | 5 | 4

=== Top half ===
First round
(France) V Royer | 6 | 6
(Australia) A Walton | 3 | 4
WC | (China) Z Zhang | 3 | 3
(Hong Kong) C Wong | 6 | 6
WC | (China) J Cui | 1 | 7^{7} | 4
5 | (Paraguay) AD Vallejo | 6 | 6^{2} | 6
Q | (China) F Sun | 2 | 0
R Safiullin | 6 | 6
(China) Y Bu | 6 | 6
WC | (United States) M Zheng | 4 | 3
(Italy) M Bellucci | 3 | 4
8 | (Poland) K Majchrzak | 6 | 6

Second round
1 | D Medvedev | 7^{8} | 6
(France) V Royer | 6^{6} | 3
(Hong Kong) C Wong | 7^{7} | 4 | 6
5 | (Paraguay) AD Vallejo | 6^{2} | 6 | 3
4 | (France) Q Halys | 7 | 3 | 4
R Safiullin | 5 | 6 | 6
(China) Y Bu | 7^{7} | 6^{5} | 6
8 | (Poland) K Majchrzak | 6^{4} | 7^{7} | 2

Quarterfinals
1 | D Medvedev | 6 | 6^{2} | 6
(Hong Kong) C Wong | 3 | 7^{7} | 3
R Safiullin | 6 | 6
(China) Y Bu | 3 | 3

Semifinals
1 | D Medvedev | 7 | 6
R Safiullin | 5 | 4

=== Bottom half ===
First round
6 | (Hungary) F Marozsán | 6 | 6
Q | (Australia) A Bolt | 4 | 2
(Australia) D Sweeny | 6^{6} | 2
Q | (Japan) T Daniel | 7^{8} | 6
(Australia) A Vukic | 6^{5} | 6 | 3
(France) K Jacquet | 7^{7} | 3 | 6
7 | (Portugal) J Faria | 3 | 7^{11} | 6
(France) T Atmane | 6 | 6^{9} | 4
(Japan) S Shimabukuro | 4 | 4
(France) H Gaston | 6 | 6
(Australia) R Hijikata | 7^{7} | 6
Q | (Czech Republic) D Svrčina | 6^{4} | 4

Second round
6 | (Hungary) F Marozsán | 6^{2} | 7 | 7^{7}
Q | (Japan) T Daniel | 7^{7} | 5 | 6^{1}
(France) K Jacquet | 6 | 6
3 | (Argentina) TM Etcheverry | 2 | 3
7 | (Portugal) J Faria | 6 | 6^{5} | 4
(France) H Gaston | 4 | 7^{7} | 6
(Australia) R Hijikata | 3 | 3
2 | A Rublev | 6 | 6

Quarterfinals
6 | (Hungary) F Marozsán | 6^{12} | 4
(France) K Jacquet | 7^{14} | 6
(France) H Gaston | 7^{8} | 6^{4} | 1
2 | A Rublev | 6^{6} | 7^{7} | 6

Semifinals
(France) K Jacquet | 6^{0} | 1
2 | A Rublev | 7^{7} | 6

== Qualifying ==
=== Seeds ===
1. (Czech Republic) Dalibor Svrčina (qualified)
2. (Australia) Alex Bolt (qualified)
3. (Australia) Bernard Tomic (qualifying competition)
4. (Japan) Taro Daniel (qualified)
5. (Japan) Rio Noguchi (qualifying competition)
6. (Japan) Hayato Matsuoka (qualifying competition)
7. (Australia) Matthew Dellavedova (first round)
8. (Japan) Akira Santillan (qualifying competition)

=== Qualifiers ===
1. (Czech Republic) Dalibor Svrčina
2. (Australia) Alex Bolt
3. (China) Sun Fajing
4. (Japan) Taro Daniel

=== Qualifying draw ===
==== First qualifier ====
First round
1 | (Czech Republic) Dalibor Svrčina | 6 | 6
(Australia) Philip Sekulic | 3 | 2
(Japan) Masamichi Imamura | 1 | 4
5 | (Japan) Rio Noguchi | 6 | 6

Qualifying competition
1 | (Czech Republic) Dalibor Svrčina | 6 | 6
5 | (Japan) Rio Noguchi | 4 | 1

==== Second qualifier ====
First round
2 | (Australia) Alex Bolt | 6 | 6
(Australia) Omar Jasika | 4 | 3
WC | (China) Kang Kaigaoge | 3 | 0
8 | (Japan) Akira Santillan | 6 | 6

Qualifying competition
2 | (Australia) Alex Bolt | 6 | 2 | 6
8 | (Japan) Akira Santillan | 1 | 6 | 4

==== Third qualifier ====
First round
3 | (Australia) Bernard Tomic | 6^{6} | 6 | 7
WC | (China) Te Rigele | 7^{8} | 4 | 5
(China) Sun Fajing | 3 | 6 | 7^{7}
7 | (Australia) Matthew Dellavedova | 6 | 1 | 6^{4}

Qualifying competition
3 | (Australia) Bernard Tomic | 4 | 5
(China) Sun Fajing | 6 | 7

==== Fourth qualifier ====
First round
4 | (Japan) Taro Daniel | 6 | 6
(Australia) Jake Delaney | 3 | 4
(France) Arthur Weber | 4 | 5
6 | (Japan) Hayato Matsuoka | 6 | 7

Qualifying competition
4 | (Japan) Taro Daniel | 6 | 7^{11}
6 | (Japan) Hayato Matsuoka | 4 | 6^{9}
