= 2024 Hangzhou Challenger – Doubles =

Doubles
- 2024 Hangzhou Challenger

Final
- Champions: (China) Sun Fajing (China) Te Rigele
- Runners-up: (Australia) Thomas Fancutt (Japan) Yuta Shimizu
- Score: 6–3, 7–5

Events
Singles	Doubles
Hangzhou Challenger	· 2025 →

This was the first edition of the tournament.

Sun Fajing and Te Rigele won the title after defeating Thomas Fancutt and Yuta Shimizu 6–3, 7–5 in the final.

== Seeds ==
1. (United States) Evan King / (United States) Reese Stalder (first round)
2. (India) Rithvik Choudary Bollipalli / (India) Arjun Kadhe (quarterfinals)
3. (Colombia) Cristian Rodríguez / (Australia) Matthew Romios (semifinals)
4. (Japan) Toshihide Matsui / (India) Ramkumar Ramanathan (first round)

== Draw ==
=== Key ===
- Q = Qualifier
- WC = Wild card
- LL = Lucky loser
- Alt = Alternate
- SE = Special exempt
- PR = Protected ranking
- ITF = ITF entry
- JE = Junior exempt
- w/o = Walkover
- r = Retired
- d = Defaulted
- SR = Special ranking

=== Draw ===
First round
1	(United States) E King (United States) R Stalder	2	4
(Australia) T Fancutt (Japan) Y Shimizu	6	6
(Australia) B Bayldon (New Zealand) F Reynolds	3	6^{3}
(Zimbabwe) B Lock (Australia) J McCabe	6	7^{7}
3	(Colombia) C Rodríguez (Australia) MC Romios	7^{7}	6^{1}	[13]
(Chinese Taipei) R Ho (United Kingdom) J Paris	6^{4}	7^{7}	[11]
(Georgia (country)) A Bakshi (Ukraine) Vadym Ursu	2	6^{1}
WC	(China) S Tang (China) Zheng Zhan	6	7^{7}
WC	(China) F Sun (China) R Te	6	7^{7}
(New Zealand) R Statham (United States) Z Svajda	4	6^{1}
(Australia) A Bolt (Australia) A Walton	6	6
4	(Japan) T Matsui (India) R Ramanathan	3	2
(France) U Blanchet (United Kingdom) B Harris	6	6
(Ukraine) I Marchenko (Kazakhstan) D Yevseyev	3	4
(Philippines) FC Alcantara (Chinese Taipei) Y-h Hsu	0	1
2	(India) RC Bollipalli (India) A Kadhe	6	6

Quarterfinals
(Australia) T Fancutt (Japan) Y Shimizu	7^{7}	7^{7}
(Zimbabwe) B Lock (Australia) J McCabe	6^{4}	6^{1}
3	(Colombia) C Rodríguez (Australia) MC Romios	6	3	[10]
WC	(China) S Tang (China) Z Zheng	3	6	[7]
WC	(China) F Sun (China) R Te	6	3	[10]
(Australia) A Bolt (Australia) A Walton	4	6	[4]
(France) U Blanchet (United Kingdom) B Harris	6	7^{8}
2	(India) RC Bollipalli (India) A Kadhe	3	6^{6}

Semifinals
(Australia) T Fancutt (Japan) Y Shimizu	1	6	[10]
3	(Colombia) C Rodríguez (Australia) MC Romios	6	3	[7]
WC	(China) F Sun (China) R Te	6	3	[10]
(France) U Blanchet (United Kingdom) B Harris	2	6	[5]

Final
(Australia) T Fancutt (Japan) Y Shimizu	3	5
WC	(China) F Sun (China) R Te	6	7
