= Daniel Mérida =

Spanish tennis player (born 2004)

- Full name: Daniel Mérida Aguilar
- Country (sports): Spain
- Born: 26 September 2004 (age 22) Madrid, Spain
- Height: 1.88 m (6 ft 2 in)
- Plays: Right-handed (two-handed backhand)
- Coach: Israel Sevilla, Guillermo Martínez
- Prize money: US $1,492,413

Singles
- Career record: 21–10 (at ATP Tour level, Grand Slam level, and in Davis Cup)
- Career titles: 1
- Highest ranking: No. 39 (24 August 2026)
- Current ranking: No. 42 (9 November 2026)

Grand Slam singles results
- Australian Open: Q2 (2026)
- French Open: 1R (2026)
- Wimbledon: 2R (2026)
- US Open: 3R (2026)

Doubles
- Career record: 0–1 (at ATP Tour level, Grand Slam level, and in Davis Cup)
- Career titles: 0
- Highest ranking: No. 1,589 (23 September 2024)

Team competitions
- Davis Cup: 1–0
- Last updated on: 21 September 2026.

Daniel Mérida Aguilar (born 26 September 2004) is a Spanish professional tennis player. He has a career-high ATP singles ranking of No. 39 achieved on 24 August 2026. He is currently the No. 4 Spanish player in men's singles.

Mérida has won one ATP Tour singles title at the 2026 Croatia Open, as well as two titles on the ATP Challenger Tour.

== Junior career ==
Mérida reached the boys' singles quarterfinal at the 2021 French Open, where he lost to 13th seed and eventual champion Luca Van Assche. Later that season, he reached the round of 16 at the US Open, losing to top-seed and eventual runner-up Shang Juncheng.

At the 2022 edition of the French Open, Mérida reached the quarterfinals, repeating his best junior Grand Slam result, but lost to tenth seed Dino Prižmić.

Mérida had good results on the ITF junior circuit, maintaining a 77–33 singles win-loss record and reached an ITF junior combined ranking of No. 15 on 3 January 2022.

== Professional career ==
=== 2021-24: Pro beginnings and first ITF titles ===
In October 2021, Mérida won his first pro title at the "Copa Alameda" in Madrid, an M15-level event. He defeated compatriot Diego Augusto Barreto in the final.

The following season, Mérida earned his second Futures title at the M15 Valldoreix in May. He defeated top seed Oriol Roca Batalla in straight sets.

Mérida also earned titles during the 2024 season in Antalya and Madrid.

=== 2025: ATP & top 150 debuts, Challenger title ===
Mérida made his ATP Tour debut in doubles at the 2025 Qatar Open, having been awarded a wildcard with Mubarak Al-Harrasi. The pair lost to Yuki Bhambri and Ivan Dodig.

In July, he won his first Challenger title at Open de Pozoblanco, defeating sixth seed Sun Fajing in the final.

=== 2026: ATP title, Major & Masters debuts & third round, Top 40 ===
Mérida won his second Challenger title in February, this time in Tenerife, beating Francesco Maestrelli in the final. Mérida made his ATP Tour singles debut at the Masters 1000-level at the 2026 Indian Wells Open after qualifying for the main draw.

Mérida qualified for Bucharest, where he made it all the way to the final, upsetting second seed Adrian Mannarino and third seed Fábián Marozsán for his first top-100 wins, but lost to Mariano Navone in the final.

Merida then qualified for his home Masters in Madrid, and defeated Marco Trungelliti and 26th seed Corentin Moutet in the second round. As a result, he made his ATP top 100 debut at world No. 86 on 4 May 2026.

He made his Grand Slam main draw debut at the 2026 French Open but lost in the first round to Ben Shelton.

Merida reached his second ATP Tour final at the 2026 Croatia Open Umag becoming the third-youngest finalist at the event in the decade, after Carlos Alcaraz and Jannik Sinner. He won his first ATP Tour title, defeating Damir Džumhur in the final.

== Performance timeline ==
Key
W	F	SF	QF	#R	RR	Q#	DNQ	A	NH

(W) winner; (F) finalist; (SF) semifinalist; (QF) quarterfinalist; (#R) rounds 4, 3, 2, 1; (RR) round-robin stage; (Q#) qualification round; (DNQ) did not qualify; (A) absent; (NH) not held; (SR) strike rate (events won / competed); (W–L) win–loss record.

=== Singles ===
Tournament	2022	2023	2024	2025	2026	SR	W–L	Win %
Grand Slam tournaments
Australian Open	A	A	A	A	Q2	0 / 0	0–0	–
French Open	A	A	A	A	1R	0 / 1	0–1	0%
Wimbledon	A	A	A	A	2R	0 / 1	1–1	50%
US Open	A	A	A	Q3	3R	0 / 1	2–1	67%
Win–loss	0–0	0–0	0–0	0–0	3–3	0 / 3	3–3	50%
ATP 1000 tournaments
Indian Wells Open	A	A	A	A	1R	0 / 1	0–1	0%
Miami Open	A	A	A	A	Q2	0 / 0	0–0	–
Monte-Carlo Masters	A	A	A	A	A	0 / 0	0–0	–
Madrid Open	Q1	A	A	A	3R	0 / 1	2–1	67%
Italian Open	A	A	A	A	1R	0 / 1	0–1	0%
Canadian Open	A	A	A	A	QF	0 / 1	4–1	80%
Cincinnati Open	A	A	A	A	3R	0 / 1	2–1	67%
Shanghai Masters	NH	A	A	A	1R	0 / 1	0–1	0%
Paris Masters	A	A	A	A	2R	0 / 1	1–1	50%
Win–loss	0–0	0–0	0–0	0–0	9–7	0 / 3	9–7	56%

== ATP Tour finals ==
=== Singles: 2 (1 title, 1 runner-up) ===
Legend Grand Slam (–) ATP 1000 (–) ATP 500 (–) ATP 250 (1–1)	Finals by surface Hard (–) Clay (1–1) Grass (–)	Finals by setting Outdoor (1–1) Indoor (–)

Result	W–L	Date	Tournament	Tier	Surface	Opponent	Score
Loss	0–1	Apr 2026	Țiriac Open, Romania	ATP 250	Clay	(Argentina) Mariano Navone	2–6, 6–4, 5–7
Win	1–1	Jul 2026	Croatia Open, Croatia	ATP 250	Clay	(Bosnia and Herzegovina) Damir Džumhur	6–2, 5–7, 6–2

== ATP Challenger Tour finals ==
=== Singles: 4 (2 titles, 2 runner-ups) ===
Finals by surface
Hard (2–0)
Clay (0–2)

Result	W–L	Date	Tournament	Tier	Surface	Opponent	Score
Loss	0–1	Jun 2025	Open de Lyon, France	Challenger	Clay	(Argentina) Marco Trungelliti	3–6, 6–4, 3-6
Win	1–1	Jul 2025	Open Ciudad de Pozoblanco, Spain	Challenger	Hard	(China) Sun Fajing	6–3, 6–4
Win	2–1	Feb 2026	Tenerife Challenger, Spain	Challenger	Hard	(Italy) Francesco Maestrelli	6–2, 6–4
Loss	2–2	Jun 2026	Internazionali Città di Perugia, Italy	Challenger	Clay	(Portugal) Henrique Rocha	6–7^{(5–7)}, 3–6

== ITF Tour finals ==
=== Singles: 10 (6 titles, 4 runner-ups) ===
Finals by surface
Hard (2–1)
Clay (4–3)

Result	W–L	Date	Tournament	Tier	Surface	Opponent	Score
Win	1–0	Oct 2021	M15 Madrid, Spain	WTT	Clay	(Spain) Diego Augusto Barreto	6–4, 6–3
Win	2–0	May 2022	M15 Valldoreix, Spain	WTT	Clay	(Spain) Oriol Roca Batalla	2–6, 7–5, 6–2
Loss	2–1	Jun 2023	M25 Córdoba, Spain	WTT	Clay	(Spain) Javier Barranco Cosano	4–6, 1–6
Loss	2–2	Nov 2023	M15 Alcalá de Henares, Spain	WTT	Hard	(Syria) Hazem Naw	4–6, 1–6
Win	3–2	Feb 2024	M25 Antalya, Turkey	WTT	Clay	(Dominican Republic) Nick Hardt	4–6, 7–5, 6–3
Loss	3–3	Aug 2024	M25 Santander, Spain	WTT	Clay	(Spain) Pol Martín Tiffon	7–6^{(7–3)}, 2–6, 4–6
Loss	3–4	Aug 2024	M25 Oviedo, Spain	WTT	Clay	(Spain) Nicolás Álvarez Varona	6–7^{(3–7)}, 0–6
Win	4–4	Sep 2024	M15 Madrid, Spain (2)	WTT	Hard	(France) Guillaume Dalmasso	6–2, 6–3
Win	5–4	Jan 2025	M25 Doha, Qatar	WTT	Hard	(Belgium) Tibo Colson	6–4, 6–2
Win	6–4	May 2025	M25 Sabadell, Spain	WTT	Clay	(United Kingdom) Oliver Crawford	6–4, 2–6, 7–6^{(7–5)}
