= 2023 Open Castilla y León =

- Date: 24 – 30 July
- Edition: 37th
- Prize money: €118,000
- Surface: Hard
- Location: Segovia, Spain

Champions

Singles
- (Spain) Pablo Llamas Ruiz

Doubles
- (France) Dan Added / (France) Pierre-Hugues Herbert
- Open Castilla y León

The 2023 Open Castilla y León Villa de El Espinar was a professional tennis tournament played on outdoor hard courts. It was the 37th edition of the tournament and part of the 2023 ATP Challenger Tour. It took place in El Espinar, Segovia, Spain, between 24 and 30 July 2023.

== Singles main draw entrants ==
=== Seeds ===
Country	Player	Rank^{1}	Seed
HUN	Márton Fucsovics	54	1
FRA	Hugo Grenier	135	2
USA	Nicolas Moreno de Alboran	146	3
USA	Emilio Nava	171	4
ITA	Mattia Bellucci	173	5
ESP	Pablo Llamas Ruiz	180	6
FRA	Antoine Escoffier	188	7
LTU	Ričardas Berankis	194	8

- ^{1} Rankings as of 17 July 2023.

=== Other entrants ===
The following players received wildcards into the singles main draw:

- (Spain) David Jordà Sanchis
- (United Kingdom) George Loffhagen
- (Spain) Fernando Verdasco

The following player received entry into the singles main draw using a protected ranking:

- (France) Pierre-Hugues Herbert

The following players received entry into the singles main draw as alternates:

- (Switzerland) Antoine Bellier
- (Portugal) Gonçalo Oliveira
- (Czech Republic) Dominik Palán

The following players received entry from the qualifying draw:

- (Lithuania) Edas Butvilas
- (Spain) Miguel Damas
- (Spain) John Echeverría
- (Spain) Iñaki Montes de la Torre
- (Italy) Luca Potenza
- (Colombia) Adrià Soriano Barrera

== Champions ==
=== Singles ===
- (Spain) Pablo Llamas Ruiz def. (France) Antoine Escoffier 7–6^{(11–9)}, 7–6^{(7–5)}.

=== Doubles ===
- (France) Dan Added / (France) Pierre-Hugues Herbert def. (Philippines) Francis Alcantara / (China) Sun Fajing 4–6, 6–3, [12–10].
