= 2025 Open de Tenis Ciudad de Pozoblanco – Singles =

Singles
- 2025 Open de Tenis Ciudad de Pozoblanco

Final
- Champion: (Spain) Daniel Mérida
- Runner-up: (China) Sun Fajing
- Score: 6–3, 6–4

Events
Singles	Doubles
← 2024 ·	Open de Tenis Ciudad de Pozoblanco	· 2026 →

August Holmgren was the defending champion but chose not to defend his title.

Daniel Mérida won the title after defeating Sun Fajing 6–3, 6–4 in the final.

== Seeds ==
1. (France) Hugo Grenier (quarterfinals)
2. (Kazakhstan) Mikhail Kukushkin (first round)
3. (Spain) Alejandro Moro Cañas (second round)
4. (United Kingdom) Johannus Monday (quarterfinals)
5. (Spain) Daniel Mérida (champion)
6. (China) Sun Fajing (final)
7. (Uzbekistan) Khumoyun Sultanov (second round)
8. (United Kingdom) Oliver Crawford (semifinals)

== Draw ==
Key

- Q = Qualifier
- WC = Wild card
- LL = Lucky loser
- Alt = Alternate
- ITF = ITF entry
- PR = Protected ranking
- SR = Special ranking
- SE = Special exempt
- JE = Junior exempt
- JR = Junior Accelerator Programme entrant
- CO = College Accelerator Programme entrant
- NG = Next Gen Accelerator Program entrant
- w/o = Walkover
- r = Retired
- d = Defaulted

=== Finals ===
Semifinals
8	(United Kingdom) Oliver Crawford	3	6^{4}
5	(Spain) Daniel Mérida	6	7^{7}
Alt	(Portugal) Tiago Pereira	7	4	3
6	(China) Sun Fajing	5	6	6

Final
5	(Spain) Daniel Mérida	6	6
6	(China) Sun Fajing	3	4

=== Top half ===
First round
1	(France) H Grenier	6	6
(Jordan) A Shelbayh	1	2
(Brazil) M Alves	2	3
Q	(Australia) E Winter	6	6
(Spain) N Sánchez Izquierdo	4	6	3
(Portugal) G Elias	6	4	6
WC	(Spain) Miguel Cejudo	0	2
8	(United Kingdom) O Crawford	6	6
4	(United Kingdom) J Monday	6	7^{7}
Q	(Italy) Fabrizio Andaloro	4	6^{5}
(Chile) M Soto	6	3	7^{7}
(France) M Martineau	4	6	6^{3}
WC	(Spain) R Jódar	3	6	6
(Spain) N Álvarez Varona	6	2	4
Alt	(France) R Bertrand	7^{7}	1	1
5	(Spain) D Mérida	6^{5}	6	6

Second round
1	(France) H Grenier	6	6
Q	(Australia) E Winter	2	4
(Portugal) G Elias	3	6	6^{5}
8	(United Kingdom) O Crawford	6	3	7^{7}
4	(United Kingdom) J Monday	7^{7}	7^{10}
(Chile) M Soto	6^{4}	6^{8}
WC	(Spain) R Jódar	5	3
5	(Spain) D Mérida	7	6

Quarterfinals
1	(France) H Grenier	6	4	3
8	(United Kingdom) O Crawford	4	6	6
4	(United Kingdom) J Monday	3	7	4
5	(Spain) D Mérida	6	5	6

Semifinals
8	(United Kingdom) O Crawford	3	6^{4}
5	(Spain) D Mérida	6	7^{7}

=== Bottom half ===
First round
7	(Uzbekistan) K Sultanov	3	7^{8}	7^{8}
(Georgia (country)) S Purtseladze	6	6^{6}	6^{6}
Alt	(Portugal) T Pereira	6	6
WC	(Spain) Alejandro López Escribano	3	3
(China) J Cui	2	4
(Lithuania) E Butvilas	6	6
(France) D Added	1	5
3	(Spain) A Moro Cañas	6	7
6	(China) F Sun	7	7
(France) A Escoffier	5	5
Q	(United States) Dar Blanch	7^{7}	6
Q	(Spain) Àlex Martínez	6^{4}	2
Q	(India) Aryan Shah	3	6	7
(Ivory Coast) E Coulibaly	6	1	5
Q	(United Kingdom) R Peniston	6	6
2	(Kazakhstan) M Kukushkin	3	4

Second round
7	(Uzbekistan) K Sultanov	1	1
Alt	(Portugal) T Pereira	6	6
(Lithuania) E Butvilas	6	6
3	(Spain) A Moro Cañas	4	3
6	(China) F Sun	6	6^{6}	6
Q	(United States) Dar Blanch	2	7^{8}	3
Q	(India) A Shah	6	6
Q	(United Kingdom) R Peniston	3	2

Quarterfinals
Alt	(Portugal) T Pereira	6	6
(Lithuania) E Butvilas	2	4
6	(China) F Sun	6	6
Q	(India) A Shah	4	4

Semifinals
Alt	(Portugal) T Pereira	7	4	3
6	(China) F Sun	5	6	6
