= 2023 Open Castilla y León – Singles =

Singles
- 2023 Open Castilla y León

Final
- Champion: (Spain) Pablo Llamas Ruiz
- Runner-up: (France) Antoine Escoffier
- Score: 7–6^{(11–9)}, 7–6^{(7–5)}

Events
Singles	Doubles
- Open Castilla y León

Hugo Grenier was the defending champion but retired from his first round match against Dominik Palán.

Pablo Llamas Ruiz won the title after defeating Antoine Escoffier 7–6^{(11–9)}, 7–6^{(7–5)} in the final.

== Seeds ==
1. (Hungary) Márton Fucsovics (quarterfinals)
2. (France) Hugo Grenier (first round, retired)
3. (United States) Nicolas Moreno de Alboran (semifinals)
4. (United States) Emilio Nava (first round)
5. (Italy) Mattia Bellucci (first round)
6. (Spain) Pablo Llamas Ruiz (champion)
7. (France) Antoine Escoffier (final)
8. (Lithuania) Ričardas Berankis (second round)

== Draw ==
Key

- Q = Qualifier
- WC = Wild card
- LL = Lucky loser
- Alt = Alternate
- ITF = ITF entry
- PR = Protected ranking
- SR = Special ranking
- SE = Special exempt
- JE = Junior exempt
- JR = Junior Accelerator Programme entrant
- CO = College Accelerator Programme entrant
- NG = Next Gen Accelerator Program entrant
- w/o = Walkover
- r = Retired
- d = Defaulted

=== Finals ===
Semifinals
(France) Térence Atmane	4	7^{7}	3
7	(France) Antoine Escoffier	6	6^{5}	6
3	(United States) Nicolas Moreno de Alboran	7^{7}	1	6^{3}
6	(Spain) Pablo Llamas Ruiz	6^{5}	6	7^{7}

Final
7	(France) Antoine Escoffier	6^{9}	6^{5}
6	(Spain) Pablo Llamas Ruiz	7^{11}	7^{7}

=== Top half ===
First round
1	(Hungary) M Fucsovics	6	6
(Belgium) M Geerts	3	2
Q	(Colombia) A Soriano Barrera	6	2	1
(Colombia) N Mejía	3	6	6
(Canada) S Diez	3	3
(France) T Atmane	6	6
(United Kingdom) R Peniston	6	6
5	(Italy) M Bellucci	4	4
4	(United States) Em Nava	6^{4}	5
WC	(Spain) D Jordà Sanchis	7^{7}	7
Q	(Lithuania) E Butvilas	6	7^{7}
(Germany) Elmar Ejupovic	3	6^{1}
Q	(Italy) Luca Potenza	6	7
Q	(Spain) John Echeverría	4	5
Q	(Spain) I Montes de la Torre	5	2
7	(France) A Escoffier	7	6

Second round
1	(Hungary) M Fucsovics	6	2	6
(Colombia) N Mejía	3	6	1
(France) T Atmane	6	6
(United Kingdom) R Peniston	4	1
WC	(Spain) D Jordà Sanchis	6	6^{6}	6
Q	(Lithuania) E Butvilas	1	7^{8}	4
Q	(Italy) L Potenza	1	3
7	(France) A Escoffier	6	6

Quarterfinals
1	(Hungary) M Fucsovics	3	6^{10}
(France) T Atmane	6	7^{12}
WC	(Spain) D Jordà Sanchis	3	1
7	(France) A Escoffier	6	6

Semifinals
(France) T Atmane	4	7^{7}	3
7	(France) A Escoffier	6	6^{5}	6

=== Bottom half ===
First round
8	(Lithuania) R Berankis	3	6	7^{7}
WC	(United Kingdom) G Loffhagen	6	4	6^{5}
(France) D Added	7^{7}	1	4
WC	(Spain) F Verdasco	6^{4}	6	6
(Turkey) C İlkel	7^{8}	7^{7}
Alt	(Portugal) G Oliveira	6^{6}	6^{5}
(Spain) A Moro Cañas	4	2
3	(United States) N Moreno de Alboran	6	6
6	(Spain) P Llamas Ruiz	7^{7}	6
Q	(Spain) M Damas	6^{4}	3
PR	(France) P-H Herbert	4	6^{4}
(Estonia) M Lajal	6	7^{7}
Alt	(Switzerland) A Bellier	6^{2}	4
(Argentina) JP Ficovich	7^{7}	6
Alt	(Czech Republic) D Palán	6	4
2	(France) H Grenier	4	1^{r}

Second round
8	(Lithuania) R Berankis	1	4
WC	(Spain) F Verdasco	6	6
(Turkey) C İlkel	4	2
3	(United States) N Moreno de Alboran	6	6
6	(Spain) P Llamas Ruiz	6	6
(Estonia) M Lajal	4	3
(Argentina) JP Ficovich	7^{7}	6
Alt	(Czech Republic) D Palán	6^{5}	2

Quarterfinals
WC	(Spain) F Verdasco	3	2
3	(United States) N Moreno de Alboran	6	6
6	(Spain) P Llamas Ruiz	7^{7}	7
(Argentina) JP Ficovich	6^{2}	5

Semifinals
3	(United States) N Moreno de Alboran	7^{7}	1	6^{3}
6	(Spain) P Llamas Ruiz	6^{5}	6	7^{7}
