= 2026 Croatia Open Umag =

- Date: 13–18 July
- Edition: 36th
- Category: ATP 250
- Draw: 28S / 16D
- Surface: Clay
- Location: Umag, Croatia

Champions

Singles
- (Spain) Daniel Mérida

Doubles
- (Czech Republic) Adam Pavlásek / (Czech Republic) Patrik Rikl
- Croatia Open

The 2026 Croatia Open Umag, also known as the Plava Laguna Croatia Open Umag (for sponsorship reasons), is a men's tennis tournament to be played on outdoor clay courts. It will be the 36th edition of the Croatia Open, and an ATP 250 tournament on the 2026 ATP Tour. It will take place at the International Tennis Center in Umag, Croatia, from 13 July until 18 July 2026.

== Champions ==
=== Singles ===
- (Spain) Daniel Mérida def. (Bosnia and Herzegovina) Damir Džumhur, 6–2, 5–7, 6–2

=== Doubles ===
- (Czech Republic) Adam Pavlásek / (Czech Republic) Patrik Rikl def. (United Kingdom) David Stevenson / (United Kingdom) Marcus Willis, 6–3, 4–6, [10–6]

== Singles main draw entrants ==
=== Seeds ===
Country	Player	Rank^{1}	Seed
ITA	Flavio Cobolli	10	1
ESP	Alejandro Davidovich Fokina	25	2
ARG	Tomás Martín Etcheverry	32	3
ITA	Matteo Arnaldi	35	4
BEL	Alexander Blockx	36	5
~~HUN~~	~~Fábián Marozsán~~	~~53~~	~~6~~
ARG	Camilo Ugo Carabelli	58	7
CZE	Vít Kopřiva	64	8

- ^{1} Rankings are as of 29 June 2026.

=== Other entrants ===
The following players received wildcards into the main draw:

- (Croatia) Matej Dodig
- (Germany) Niels McDonald
- (Slovenia) Žiga Šeško

The following players received entry from the qualifying draw:

- (Italy) Marco Cecchinato
- (Argentina) Federico Agustín Gómez
- (Bolivia) Juan Carlos Prado Ángelo
- (Germany) Marko Topo

The following player received entry as a lucky loser:

- (Austria) Lukas Neumayer

=== Withdrawals ===
- (Poland) Hubert Hurkacz → replaced by (France) Titouan Droguet
- (Hungary) Fábián Marozsán → replaced by (Austria) Lukas Neumayer

== Doubles main draw entrants ==
=== Seeds ===
Country	Player	Country	Player	Rank^{1}	Seed
CZE	Adam Pavlásek	CZE	Patrik Rikl	84	1
GER	Constantin Frantzen	NED	Robin Haase	86	2
ARG	Máximo González	MEX	Santiago González	114	3
ARG	Andrés Molteni	USA	Patrik Trhac	115	4

- ^{1} Rankings as of 29 June 2026.

=== Other entrants ===
The following pairs received wildcards into the doubles main draw:

- (Croatia) Emanuel Ivanišević / (Croatia) Mili Poljičak
- (Croatia) Admir Kalender / (Croatia) Nino Serdarušić
