= 2026 Croatia Open Umag – Doubles =

Doubles
- 2026 Croatia Open Umag

Final
- Champions: (Czech Republic) Adam Pavlásek (Czech Republic) Patrik Rikl
- Runners-up: (United Kingdom) David Stevenson (United Kingdom) Marcus Willis
- Score: 6−3, 4−6 [10−6]

Events
| Singles | Doubles |
- Croatia Open

Adam Pavlásek and Patrik Rikl defeated David Stevenson and Marcus Willis in the final, 6−3, 4−6, [10−6] to win the doubles tennis title at the 2026 Croatia Open Umag. It was the first ATP Tour title for Pavlásek and third for Rikl.

Romain Arneodo and Manuel Guinard were the reigning champions, but chose not to participate this year.

== Seeds ==
1. (Czech Republic) Adam Pavlásek / (Czech Republic) Patrik Rikl (champions)
2. (Germany) Constantin Frantzen / (Netherlands) Robin Haase (quarterfinals)
3. (Argentina) Maximo González / (Mexico) Santiago González (quarterfinals)
4. (Argentina) Andrés Molteni / (United States) Patrik Trhac (first round)

== Draw ==
Key

- Q = Qualifier
- WC = Wild card
- LL = Lucky loser
- Alt = Alternate
- ITF = ITF entry
- PR = Protected ranking
- SR = Special ranking
- SE = Special exempt
- JE = Junior exempt
- JR = Junior Accelerator Programme entrant
- CO = College Accelerator Programme entrant
- NG = Next Gen Accelerator Program entrant
- w/o = Walkover
- r = Retired
- d = Defaulted

=== Draw ===
First round
1 | (Czech Republic) A Pavlásek (Czech Republic) P Rikl | 6 | 6
WC | (Croatia) E Ivanišević (Croatia) M Poljičak | 4 | 2
(South Korea) J-s Nam (Finland) P Niklas-Salminen | 3 | 6 | [10]
(Czech Republic) F Duda (Czech Republic) M Vrbenský | 6 | 4 | [4]
3 | (Argentina) M González (Mexico) S González | 6 | 6
(Thailand) P Isaro (India) N Kaliyanda Poonacha | 2 | 2
(Chinese Taipei) R Ho (United States) B Kittay | 4 | 6 | [10]
(Argentina) RA Burruchaga (Argentina) M Kestelboim | 6 | 1 | [12]
(France) A Reymond (France) L Sanchez | 3 | 6^{6}
(United Kingdom) D Stevenson (United Kingdom) M Willis | 6 | 7^{8}
(Bosnia and Herzegovina) D Džumhur (Serbia) S Latinović | 7 | 4 | [10]
4 | (Argentina) A Molteni (United States) P Trhac | 5 | 6 | [5]
WC | (Croatia) A Kalender (Croatia) N Serdarušić | 6 | 6
I Liutarevich (Mexico) MÁ Reyes-Varela | 4 | 1
(India) S Banthia (Bulgaria) A Donski | 5 | 4
2 | (Germany) C Frantzen (Netherlands) R Haase | 7 | 6

Quarterfinals
1 | (Czech Republic) A Pavlásek (Czech Republic) P Rikl | 6 | 5 | [10]
(South Korea) J-s Nam (Finland) P Niklas-Salminen | 3 | 7 | [4]
3 | (Argentina) M González (Mexico) S González | 7^{7} | 2 | [6]
(Argentina) RA Burruchaga (Argentina) M Kestelboim | 6^{4} | 6 | [10]
(United Kingdom) D Stevenson (United Kingdom) M Willis | 6 | 6
(Bosnia and Herzegovina) D Džumhur (Serbia) S Latinović | 1 | 4
WC | (Croatia) A Kalender (Croatia) N Serdarušić | 6 | 7^{7}
2 | (Germany) C Frantzen (Netherlands) R Haase | 3 | 6^{4}

Semifinals
1 | (Czech Republic) A Pavlásek (Czech Republic) P Rikl | 6 | 6
(Argentina) RA Burruchaga (Argentina) M Kestelboim | 4 | 4
(United Kingdom) D Stevenson (United Kingdom) M Willis | 7^{7} | 2 | [10]
WC | (Croatia) A Kalender (Croatia) N Serdarušić | 6^{2} | 6 | [5]

Final
1 | (Czech Republic) A Pavlásek (Czech Republic) P Rikl | 6 | 4 | [10]
(United Kingdom) D Stevenson (United Kingdom) M Willis | 3 | 6 | [6]
