= 2025 Open Sopra Steria de Lyon – Doubles =

Doubles
- 2025 Open Sopra Steria de Lyon

Final
- Champions: (Chinese Taipei) Hsu Yu-hsiou (Japan) Kaichi Uchida
- Runners-up: (France) Luca Sanchez (Japan) Seita Watanabe
- Score: 1–6, 6–3, [12–10]

Events
Singles	Doubles
- Open Sopra Steria de Lyon

Manuel Guinard and Grégoire Jacq were the defending champions but chose not to defend their title.

Hsu Yu-hsiou and Kaichi Uchida won the title after defeating Luca Sanchez and Seita Watanabe 1–6, 6–3, [12–10] in the final.

== Seeds ==
1. (Brazil) Orlando Luz / (Brazil) Marcelo Zormann (quarterfinals)
2. (Chinese Taipei) Ray Ho / (Spain) David Vega Hernández (semifinals)
3. (Switzerland) Jakub Paul / (Czech Republic) Michael Vrbenský (semifinals)
4. (France) Geoffrey Blancaneaux / (France) Jonathan Eysseric (first round)

== Draw ==
Key

- Q = Qualifier
- WC = Wild card
- LL = Lucky loser
- Alt = Alternate
- ITF = ITF entry
- PR = Protected ranking
- SR = Special ranking
- SE = Special exempt
- JE = Junior exempt
- JR = Junior Accelerator Programme entrant
- CO = College Accelerator Programme entrant
- NG = Next Gen Accelerator Program entrant
- w/o = Walkover
- r = Retired
- d = Defaulted

=== Draw ===
First round
1	(Brazil) O Luz (Brazil) M Zormann	6	6
(Belgium) M Geerts (Denmark) J Ingildsen	3	4
(United Kingdom) T Hands (United Kingdom) J MacKinlay	6^{3}	3
(France) L Sanchez (Japan) S Watanabe	7^{7}	6
3	(Switzerland) J Paul (Czech Republic) M Vrbenský	6	7^{8}
WC	(France) Joshua Dous Karpenschif (France) Maé Malige	0	6^{6}
(Argentina) JP Ficovich (Paraguay) AD Vallejo	5	2
(Zimbabwe) CJ Lock (Netherlands) T Loof	7	6
(Chinese Taipei) Y-h Hsu (Japan) K Uchida	6	6
(Sweden) E Grevelius (Netherlands) M Hermans	4	4
(India) A Kalyanpur (India) Parikshit Somani	6	7
4	(France) G Blancaneaux (France) J Eysseric	4	5
(Spain) A Moro Cañas (Argentina) M Trungelliti	7^{9}	6
I Gakhov (Brazil) Gabriel Roveri Sidney	6^{7}	3
WC	(France) Yanis Ghazouani Durand (France) Loann Massard	1	4
2	(Chinese Taipei) R Ho (Spain) D Vega Hernández	6	6

Quarterfinals
1	(Brazil) O Luz (Brazil) M Zormann	6	4	[8]
(France) L Sanchez (Japan) S Watanabe	4	6	[10]
3	(Switzerland) J Paul (Czech Republic) M Vrbenský	7	6
(Zimbabwe) CJ Lock (Netherlands) T Loof	5	4
(Chinese Taipei) Y-h Hsu (Japan) K Uchida	6	6
(India) A Kalyanpur (India) P Somani	2	2
(Spain) A Moro Cañas (Argentina) M Trungelliti	4	4
2	(Chinese Taipei) R Ho (Spain) D Vega Hernández	6	6

Semifinals
(France) L Sanchez (Japan) S Watanabe	6	6
3	(Switzerland) J Paul (Czech Republic) M Vrbenský	2	2
(Chinese Taipei) Y-h Hsu (Japan) K Uchida	6	7^{7}
2	(Chinese Taipei) R Ho (Spain) D Vega Hernández	4	6^{2}

Final
(France) L Sanchez (Japan) S Watanabe	6	3	[10]
(Chinese Taipei) Y-h Hsu (Japan) K Uchida	1	6	[12]
