= 2025 Open Sopra Steria de Lyon – Singles =

Singles
- 2025 Open Sopra Steria de Lyon

Final
- Champion: (Argentina) Marco Trungelliti
- Runner-up: (Spain) Daniel Mérida
- Score: 6–3, 4–6, 6–3

Events
| Singles | Doubles |
- Open Sopra Steria de Lyon

Hugo Gaston was the defending champion but chose not to defend his title.

Marco Trungelliti won the title after defeating Daniel Mérida 6–3, 4–6, 6–3 in the final.

== Seeds ==
1. (Spain) Pablo Carreño Busta (quarterfinals)
2. (Denmark) Elmer Møller (first round)
3. (France) Arthur Cazaux (second round)
4. (France) Kyrian Jacquet (first round)
5. (Argentina) Juan Pablo Ficovich (first round)
6. (India) Sumit Nagal (first round)
7. (France) Calvin Hemery (first round)
8. (Argentina) Marco Trungelliti (champion)

== Draw ==
Key

- Q = Qualifier
- WC = Wild card
- LL = Lucky loser
- Alt = Alternate
- ITF = ITF entry
- PR = Protected ranking
- SR = Special ranking
- SE = Special exempt
- JE = Junior exempt
- JR = Junior Accelerator Programme entrant
- CO = College Accelerator Programme entrant
- NG = Next Gen Accelerator Program entrant
- w/o = Walkover
- r = Retired
- d = Defaulted

=== Finals ===
Semifinals
(Belgium) Gauthier Onclin | 3 | 1
(Spain) Daniel Mérida | 6 | 6
8 | (Argentina) Marco Trungelliti | 6 | 7
WC | (France) Clément Tabur | 1 | 5

Final
(Spain) Daniel Mérida | 3 | 6 | 3
8 | (Argentina) Marco Trungelliti | 6 | 4 | 6

=== Top half ===
First round
1 | (Spain) P Carreño Busta | 7^{7} | 6
(France) T Droguet | 6^{3} | 3
Alt | (Spain) J Barranco Cosano | 6 | 2
(Spain) P Martín Tiffon | 4 | 2^{r}
Q | (France) T Legout | 4 | 6^{6}
Q | (France) L Poullain | 6 | 7^{8}
(Belgium) G Onclin | 7 | 6
5 | (Argentina) JP Ficovich | 5 | 3
4 | (France) K Jacquet | 4 | 4
(Spain) D Mérida | 6 | 6
Q | (Spain) N Álvarez Varona | 3 | 5
(Germany) H Squire | 6 | 7
(France) L Van Assche | 1 | 6 | 6
Q | (Czech Republic) M Vrbenský | 6 | 1 | 4
(France) G Blancaneaux | 6 | 7^{7}
6 | (India) S Nagal | 4 | 6^{4}

Second round
1 | (Spain) P Carreño Busta | 6 | 6
Alt | (Spain) J Barranco Cosano | 1 | 3
Q | (France) L Poullain | 5 | 6^{4}
(Belgium) G Onclin | 7 | 7^{7}
(Spain) D Mérida | 3 | 6 | 6
(Germany) H Squire | 6 | 1 | 4
(France) L Van Assche | 6 | 7
(France) G Blancaneaux | 4 | 5

Quarterfinals
1 | (Spain) P Carreño Busta | 4 | 2
(Belgium) G Onclin | 6 | 6
(Spain) D Mérida | 6 | 6
(France) L Van Assche | 4 | 3

Semifinals
(Belgium) G Onclin | 3 | 1
(Spain) D Mérida | 6 | 6

=== Bottom half ===
First round
8 | (Argentina) M Trungelliti | 6 | 6
(Spain) A Moro Cañas | 2 | 3
I Gakhov | 2
Q | (Australia) Matthew Dellavedova | 1^{r}
WC | (France) T Paris | 5 | 6^{5}
(Bulgaria) D Kuzmanov | 7 | 7^{7}
Q | (France) M Janvier | 3 | 3
3 | (France) A Cazaux | 6 | 6
7 | (France) C Hemery | 4 | 2
WC | (France) C Tabur | 6 | 6
(Belgium) M Geerts | 4 | 3
WC | (France) A Géa | 6 | 6
(France) M Martineau | 5 | 5
(Paraguay) AD Vallejo | 7 | 7
(Chinese Taipei) Y-h Hsu | 6 | 6
2 | (Denmark) E Møller | 2 | 3

Second round
8 | (Argentina) M Trungelliti | 2 | 6 | 6
I Gakhov | 6 | 4 | 3
(Bulgaria) D Kuzmanov | 7 | 6
3 | (France) A Cazaux | 5 | 1
WC | (France) C Tabur | 3 | 6 | 6
WC | (France) A Géa | 6 | 4 | 0
(Paraguay) AD Vallejo | 4 | 1
(Chinese Taipei) Y-h Hsu | 6 | 6

Quarterfinals
8 | (Argentina) M Trungelliti | 3 | 6 | 6
(Bulgaria) D Kuzmanov | 6 | 3 | 4
WC | (France) C Tabur | 6 | 7^{7}
(Chinese Taipei) Y-h Hsu | 4 | 6^{3}

Semifinals
8 | (Argentina) M Trungelliti | 6 | 7
WC | (France) C Tabur | 1 | 5
