= 2023 Open Castilla y León – Doubles =

Doubles
- 2023 Open Castilla y León

Final
- Champions: (France) Dan Added (France) Pierre-Hugues Herbert
- Runners-up: (Philippines) Francis Alcantara (China) Sun Fajing
- Score: 4–6, 6–3, [12–10]

Events
Singles	Doubles
- Open Castilla y León

Nicolás Álvarez Varona and Iñaki Montes de la Torre were the defending champions but chose not to defend their title.

Dan Added and Pierre-Hugues Herbert won the title after defeating Francis Alcantara and Sun Fajing 4–6, 6–3, [12–10] in the final.

== Seeds ==
1. (Pakistan) Aisam-ul-Haq Qureshi / (India) Divij Sharan (quarterfinals)
2. (South Korea) Nam Ji-sung / (South Korea) Song Min-kyu (semifinals)
3. (India) Rithvik Choudary Bollipalli / (India) Arjun Kadhe (first round)
4. (France) Dan Added / (France) Pierre-Hugues Herbert (champions)

== Draw ==
Key

- Q = Qualifier
- WC = Wild card
- LL = Lucky loser
- Alt = Alternate
- ITF = ITF entry
- PR = Protected ranking
- SR = Special ranking
- SE = Special exempt
- JE = Junior exempt
- JR = Junior Accelerator Programme entrant
- CO = College Accelerator Programme entrant
- NG = Next Gen Accelerator Program entrant
- w/o = Walkover
- r = Retired
- d = Defaulted

First round
(Philippines) FC Alcantara (China) F Sun	6	3	[10]
WC	(Spain) D Marrero (Spain) F Verdasco	2	6	[8]
3	(India) RC Bollipalli (India) A Kadhe	6^{8}	6	[7]
WC	(Spain) M Damas (Spain) John Echeverría	7^{10}	4	[10]
(Israel) D Cukierman (Colombia) A Soriano Barrera	7^{7}	7
(France) A Escoffier (United Kingdom) J Paris	6^{1}	5
(France) C Bittoun Kouzmine (Latvia) R Strombachs	7	6
(Canada) S Diez (Moldova) I Snițari	5	1
(Argentina) T Lipovšek Puches (Argentina) Matías Zukas	4	1
4	(France) D Added (France) P-H Herbert	6	6
A Kachmazov (Czech Republic) D Palán	6^{4}	6	[6]
(Israel) R Stepanov (United States) Tennyson Whiting	7^{7}	4	[10]
(Italy) M Bellucci (France) A Bouquier	4	4
2	(South Korea) J-s Nam (South Korea) M-k Song	6	6

Quarterfinals
1	(Pakistan) A-u-H Qureshi (India) D Sharan	4	3
(Philippines) FC Alcantara (China) F Sun	6	6
WC	(Spain) M Damas (Spain) J Echeverría	3	6^{6}
(Israel) D Cukierman (Colombia) A Soriano Barrera	6	7^{8}
(France) C Bittoun Kouzmine (Latvia) R Strombachs	6^{5}	3
4	(France) D Added (France) P-H Herbert	7^{7}	6
(Israel) R Stepanov (United States) T Whiting	6^{7}	5
2	(South Korea) J-s Nam (South Korea) M-k Song	7^{9}	7

Semifinals
(Philippines) FC Alcantara (China) F Sun	3	6	[10]
(Israel) D Cukierman (Colombia) A Soriano Barrera	6	3	[8]
4	(France) D Added (France) P-H Herbert	6	6
2	(South Korea) J-s Nam (South Korea) M-k Song	2	3

Final
(Philippines) FC Alcantara (China) F Sun	6	3	[10]
4	(France) D Added (France) P-H Herbert	4	6	[12]
