= 2025 Open de Tenis Ciudad de Pozoblanco =

- Date: 14–20 July
- Edition: 19th
- Surface: Hard
- Location: Pozoblanco, Spain

Champions

Singles
- (Spain) Daniel Mérida

Doubles
- (Spain) Iñaki Montes de la Torre / (China) Sun Fajing
- Open de Tenis Ciudad de Pozoblanco

The 2025 Open de Tenis Ciudad de Pozoblanco was a professional tennis tournament played on hardcourts. It was the 19th edition of the tournament, which was part of the 2025 ATP Challenger Tour. It took place in Pozoblanco, Spain between 14 and 20 July 2025.

== Singles main-draw entrants ==
=== Seeds ===
Country	Player	Rank^{1}	Seed
FRA	Hugo Grenier	175	1
KAZ	Mikhail Kukushkin	189	2
ESP	Alejandro Moro Cañas	208	3
GBR	Johannus Monday	224	4
ESP	Daniel Mérida	235	5
CHN	Sun Fajing	244	6
UZB	Khumoyun Sultanov	246	7
GBR	Oliver Crawford	248	8

- ^{1} Rankings are as of 30 June 2025.

=== Other entrants ===
The following players received wildcards into the singles main draw:

- (Spain) Miguel Cejudo
- (Spain) Rafael Jódar
- (Spain) Alejandro López Escribano

The following players received entry into the singles main draw as alternates:

- (France) Robin Bertrand
- (Portugal) Tiago Pereira

The following players received entry from the qualifying draw:

- (Italy) Fabrizio Andaloro
- (United States) Darwin Blanch
- (Spain) Àlex Martínez
- (United Kingdom) Ryan Peniston
- (India) Aryan Shah
- (Australia) Edward Winter

== Champions ==
=== Singles ===
- (Spain) Daniel Mérida def. (China) Sun Fajing 6–3, 6–4.

=== Doubles ===
- (Spain) Iñaki Montes de la Torre / (China) Sun Fajing def. (Bulgaria) Anthony Genov / (Israel) Roy Stepanov 6–1, 7–6^{(10–8)}.
