= 2025 Open de Tenis Ciudad de Pozoblanco – Doubles =

Doubles
- 2025 Open de Tenis Ciudad de Pozoblanco

Final
- Champions: (Spain) Iñaki Montes de la Torre (China) Sun Fajing
- Runners-up: (Bulgaria) Anthony Genov (Israel) Roy Stepanov
- Score: 6–1, 7–6^{(10–8)}

Events
Singles	Doubles
- Open de Tenis Ciudad de Pozoblanco

Dan Added and Arthur Reymond were the defending champions but lost in the quarterfinals to Matteo Martineau and Luca Sanchez.

Iñaki Montes de la Torre and Sun Fajing won the title after defeating Anthony Genov and Roy Stepanov 6–1, 7–6^{(10–8)} in the final.

== Seeds ==
1. (Bolivia) Boris Arias / (Chile) Matías Soto (quarterfinals)
2. (Denmark) Johannes Ingildsen / (Portugal) Tiago Pereira (semifinals)
3. (Czech Republic) David Poljak / (China) Wang Aoran (first round)
4. (France) Dan Added / (France) Arthur Reymond (quarterfinals)

== Draw ==
Key

- Q = Qualifier
- WC = Wild card
- LL = Lucky loser
- Alt = Alternate
- ITF = ITF entry
- PR = Protected ranking
- SR = Special ranking
- SE = Special exempt
- JE = Junior exempt
- JR = Junior Accelerator Programme entrant
- CO = College Accelerator Programme entrant
- NG = Next Gen Accelerator Program entrant
- w/o = Walkover
- r = Retired
- d = Defaulted

=== Draw ===
First round
1	(Bolivia) B Arias (Chile) M Soto	7^{7}	3	[10]
(United Kingdom) T Hands (United Kingdom) M Whitehouse	6^{4}	6	[6]
(Bulgaria) A Genov (Israel) R Stepanov	7^{7}	7^{7}
D Golubev (India) R Ramanathan	6^{3}	6^{3}
4	(France) D Added (France) A Reymond	6	6
(Georgia (country)) A Bakshi (Georgia (country)) S Purtseladze	2	1
WC	(Spain) N Álvarez Varona (Spain) N Sánchez Izquierdo	5	3
(France) M Martineau (France) L Sanchez	7	6
(France) R Bertrand (India) A Kalyanpur	7	6^{2}	[10]
(Brazil) M Alves (Brazil) Gabriel Roveri Sidney	5	7^{7}	[8]
(Spain) I Montes de la Torre (China) F Sun	6^{3}	6	[10]
3	(Czech Republic) D Poljak (China) A Wang	7^{7}	2	[6]
(Lithuania) E Butvilas (Spain) A Moro Cañas	6^{5}	6	[7]
(United Kingdom) S Duncan (United Kingdom) J MacKinlay	7^{7}	3	[10]
WC	(Spain) Miguel Cejudo (Spain) Alejandro López Escribano	0	2
2	(Denmark) J Ingildsen (Portugal) T Pereira	6	6

Quarterfinals
1	(Bolivia) B Arias (Chile) M Soto	7	6^{9}	[3]
(Bulgaria) A Genov (Israel) R Stepanov	5	7^{11}	[10]
4	(France) D Added (France) A Reymond	7^{7}	3	[7]
(France) M Martineau (France) L Sanchez	6^{5}	6	[10]
(France) R Bertrand (India) A Kalyanpur	2	4
(Spain) I Montes de la Torre (China) F Sun	6	6
(United Kingdom) S Duncan (United Kingdom) J MacKinlay	6	3	[5]
2	(Denmark) J Ingildsen (Portugal) T Pereira	3	6	[10]

Semifinals
(Bulgaria) A Genov (Israel) R Stepanov	7^{12}	7^{7}
(France) M Martineau (France) L Sanchez	6^{10}	6^{3}
(Spain) I Montes de la Torre (China) F Sun	6	6
2	(Denmark) J Ingildsen (Portugal) T Pereira	4	1

Final
(Bulgaria) A Genov (Israel) R Stepanov	1	6^{8}
(Spain) I Montes de la Torre (China) F Sun	6	7^{10}
