= 2025 Open Sopra Steria de Lyon =

- Date: 9–15 June
- Edition: 9th
- Surface: Clay
- Location: Lyon, France

Champions

Singles
- (Argentina) Marco Trungelliti

Doubles
- (Chinese Taipei) Hsu Yu-hsiou / (Japan) Kaichi Uchida
- Open Sopra Steria de Lyon

The 2025 Open Sopra Steria de Lyon was a professional tennis tournament played on clay courts. It was the 9th edition of the tournament which was part of the 2025 ATP Challenger Tour. It took place in Lyon, France, between 9 and 15 June 2025.

== Singles main-draw entrants ==
=== Seeds ===
| Country | Player | Rank^{1} | Seed |
|---|---|---|---|
| ESP | Pablo Carreño Busta | 99 | 1 |
| DEN | Elmer Møller | 112 | 2 |
| FRA | Arthur Cazaux | 113 | 3 |
| FRA | Kyrian Jacquet | 150 | 4 |
| ARG | Juan Pablo Ficovich | 152 | 5 |
| IND | Sumit Nagal | 170 | 6 |
| FRA | Calvin Hemery | 171 | 7 |
| ARG | Marco Trungelliti | 177 | 8 |

- ^{1} Rankings are as of 26 May 2025.

=== Other entrants ===
The following players received wildcards into the singles main draw:

- (France) Arthur Géa
- (France) Tom Paris
- (France) Clément Tabur

The following player received entry into the singles main draw as an alternate:

- (Spain) Javier Barranco Cosano

The following players received entry from the qualifying draw:

- (Spain) Nicolás Álvarez Varona
- (Australia) Matthew Dellavedova
- (France) Maxime Janvier
- (France) Timo Legout
- (France) Lucas Poullain
- (Czech Republic) Michael Vrbenský

== Champions ==
=== Singles ===
- (Argentina) Marco Trungelliti def. (Spain) Daniel Mérida 6–3, 4–6, 6–3.

=== Doubles ===
- (Chinese Taipei) Hsu Yu-hsiou / (Japan) Kaichi Uchida def. (France) Luca Sanchez / (Japan) Seita Watanabe 1–6, 6–3, [12–10].
