= Hangzhou Challenger =

- 2024 Hangzhou Challenger

ATP Challenger Tour
- Location: Hangzhou, China
- Category: ATP Challenger Tour 125
- Surface: Hard

The Hangzhou Challenger is a professional tennis tournament played on hardcourts. It is currently part of the ATP Challenger Tour 125. It was held in Hangzhou, China in 2024.

== Past finals ==
=== Singles ===
| Year | Champion | Runner-up | Score |
|---|---|---|---|
| 2025–26 | Not held | | |
| 2024 | (Australia) James Duckworth | (United States) Mackenzie McDonald | 2–6, 7–6^{(7–5)}, 6–4 |

=== Doubles ===
| Year | Champions | Runners-up | Score |
|---|---|---|---|
| 2024 | (China) Sun Fajing (China) Te Rigele | (Australia) Thomas Fancutt (Japan) Yuta Shimizu | 6–3, 7–5 |
