= 2026 Croatia Open Umag – Singles =

Singles
- 2026 Croatia Open Umag

Final
- Champion: (Spain) Daniel Mérida
- Runner-up: (Bosnia and Herzegovina) Damir Džumhur
- Score: 6–2, 5–7, 6–2

Details
- Draw: 28 (4Q / 3WC)
- Seeds: 8

Events
Singles	Doubles
- Croatia Open

Daniel Mérida defeated Damir Džumhur in the final, 6–2, 5–7, 6–2 to win the singles tennis title at the 2026 Croatia Open Umag. It was his first ATP Tour title.

Luciano Darderi was the reigning champion, but he chose to compete in Båstad instead.

== Seeds ==
The top four seeds received a bye into the second round.

1. (Italy) Flavio Cobolli (second round)
2. (Spain) Alejandro Davidovich Fokina (quarterfinals)
3. (Argentina) Tomás Martín Etcheverry (second round)
4. (Italy) Matteo Arnaldi (quarterfinals)
5. (Belgium) Alexander Blockx (first round)
6. (Hungary) Fábián Marozsán (withdrew)
7. (Argentina) Camilo Ugo Carabelli (quarterfinals)
8. (Czech Republic) Vít Kopřiva (first round)

== Draw ==
Key

- Q = Qualifier
- WC = Wild card
- LL = Lucky loser
- Alt = Alternate
- ITF = ITF entry
- PR = Protected ranking
- SR = Special ranking
- SE = Special exempt
- JE = Junior exempt
- JR = Junior Accelerator Programme entrant
- CO = College Accelerator Programme entrant
- NG = Next Gen Accelerator Program entrant
- w/o = Walkover
- r = Retired
- d = Defaulted

=== Finals ===
Semifinals
(Argentina) Román Andrés Burruchaga	4	2
(Spain) Daniel Mérida	6	6
(Bosnia and Herzegovina) Damir Džumhur	3	6	6
(Slovakia) Alex Molčan	6	4	3

Final
(Spain) Daniel Mérida	6	5	6
(Bosnia and Herzegovina) Damir Džumhur	2	7	2

=== Top half ===
First round
Q	(Italy) M Cecchinato	1	4
(Argentina) RA Burruchaga	6	6
WC	(Croatia) M Dodig	4	2
(Spain) P Carreño Busta	6	6
Q	(Germany) M Topo	7^{7}	6^{3}	3
7	(Argentina) C Ugo Carabelli	6^{2}	7^{7}	6
WC	(Slovenia) Ž Šeško	4	1
(Spain) D Mérida	6	6
(Serbia) D Lajović	6	5	4
(France) L Van Assche	2	7	6
(France) T Droguet	3	6	6
5	(Belgium) A Blockx	6	2	0

Second round
1	(Italy) F Cobolli	2	4
(Argentina) RA Burruchaga	6	6
(Spain) P Carreño Busta	6	5	5
7	(Argentina) C Ugo Carabelli	3	7	7
3	(Argentina) TM Etcheverry	5	4
(Spain) D Mérida	7	6
(France) L Van Assche	1	6	5
(France) T Droguet	6	1	7

Quarterfinals
(Argentina) RA Burruchaga	6	2	6
7	(Argentina) C Ugo Carabelli	2	6	3
(Spain) D Mérida	6	6
(France) T Droguet	1	3

Semifinals
(Argentina) RA Burruchaga	4	2
(Spain) D Mérida	6	6

=== Bottom half ===
First round
LL	(Austria) L Neumayer	3	6^{6}
Q	(Bolivia) JC Prado Ángelo	6	7^{8}
(Bosnia and Herzegovina) D Džumhur	6	6
(Portugal) H Rocha	2	1
Q	(Argentina) FA Gómez	6	7^{7}
WC	(Germany) N McDonald	3	6^{4}
8	(Czech Republic) V Kopřiva	1	3
(Croatia) D Prižmić	6	6
(Slovakia) A Molčan	6	7
(France) V Royer	4	5
(France) K Jacquet	2	3
(Argentina) M Trungelliti	6	6

Second round
Q	(Bolivia) JC Prado Ángelo	6^{2}	1
(Bosnia and Herzegovina) D Džumhur	7^{7}	6
Q	(Argentina) FA Gómez	3	7	3
4	(Italy) M Arnaldi	6	5	6
(Croatia) D Prižmić	6	6^{5}	0^{r}
(Slovakia) A Molčan	3	7^{7}	4
(Argentina) M Trungelliti	4	5
2	(Spain) A Davidovich Fokina	6	7

Quarterfinals
(Bosnia and Herzegovina) D Džumhur	7^{7}	6^{4}	7^{7}
4	(Italy) M Arnaldi	6^{5}	7^{7}	6^{4}
(Slovakia) A Molčan	3	6	6
2	(Spain) A Davidovich Fokina	6	1	2

Semifinals
(Bosnia and Herzegovina) D Džumhur	3	6	6
(Slovakia) A Molčan	6	4	3

== Qualifying ==
=== Seeds ===
1. (Italy) Luca Nardi (first round)
2. (Austria) Lukas Neumayer (qualifying competition, lucky loser)
3. (Bolivia) Juan Carlos Prado Ángelo (qualified)
4. (Italy) Marco Cecchinato (qualified)
5. (Argentina) Genaro Alberto Olivieri (qualifying competition)
6. (Argentina) Federico Agustín Gómez (qualified)
7. (Spain) Nikolás Sánchez Izquierdo (qualifying competition)
8. (Spain) Pol Martín Tiffon (first round, retired)

=== Qualifiers ===
1. (Argentina) Federico Agustín Gómez
2. (Germany) Marko Topo
3. (Bolivia) Juan Carlos Prado Ángelo
4. (Italy) Marco Cecchinato

=== Lucky loser ===
1. (Austria) Lukas Neumayer

=== Qualifying draw ===
==== First qualifier ====
First round
1	(Italy) Luca Nardi	3	6^{5}
(Italy) Andrea Guerrieri	6	7^{7}
(Italy) Raúl Brancaccio	7	2	4
6/Alt	(Argentina) Federico Agustín Gómez	5	6	6

Qualifying competition
(Italy) Andrea Guerrieri	4	4
6/Alt	(Argentina) Federico Agustín Gómez	6	6

==== Second qualifier ====
First round
2	(Austria) Lukas Neumayer	6	4	6
(Croatia) Mili Poljičak	4	6	4
(Germany) Marko Topo	6	0
8	(Spain) Pol Martín Tiffon	4	0^{r}

Qualifying competition
2	(Austria) Lukas Neumayer	6^{7}	5
(Germany) Marko Topo	7^{9}	7

==== Third qualifier ====
First round
3	(Bolivia) Juan Carlos Prado Ángelo	6	6
WC	(Germany) Marc Majdandzic	4	3
(Slovakia) Norbert Gombos	6^{4}	2
7	(Spain) Nikolás Sánchez Izquierdo	7^{7}	6

Qualifying competition
3	(Bolivia) Juan Carlos Prado Ángelo	6	7^{7}
7	(Spain) Nikolás Sánchez Izquierdo	3	6^{4}

==== Fourth qualifier ====
First round
4	(Italy) Marco Cecchinato	6	6
(Croatia) Duje Ajduković	3	4
WC	(Croatia) Noa Vukadin	2	4
5	(Argentina) Genaro Alberto Olivieri	6	6

Qualifying competition
4	(Italy) Marco Cecchinato	6	6
5	(Argentina) Genaro Alberto Olivieri	2	4
