= 2024 Rolex Shanghai Masters – Singles =

Singles
- 2024 Rolex Shanghai Masters

Final
- Champion: (Italy) Jannik Sinner
- Runner-up: (Serbia) Novak Djokovic
- Score: 7–6^{(7–4)}, 6–3

Details
- Draw: 96 (12 Q / 5 WC )
- Seeds: 32

Events
Singles	Doubles
- Shanghai Masters

Jannik Sinner defeated Novak Djokovic in the final, 7–6^{(7–4)}, 6–3 to win the singles tennis title at the 2024 Shanghai Masters. It was his fourth ATP 1000 singles title, seventh title of the season, and 17th career title. By reaching the final, Sinner secured the year-end No. 1 ranking for the first time in his career. Djokovic reached a record-extending 59th career ATP 1000 final.

Hubert Hurkacz was the reigning champion, but withdrew before the tournament began due to a knee injury.

With his second-round win, Wu Yibing became the second-ever Chinese player in tournament history to reach the third round (after Zhizhen Zhang). The second-round match between Tomás Martín Etcheverry and Botic van de Zandschulp, which lasted 3 hours and 43 minutes, was the longest in the tournament's history.

== Seeds ==
All seeds receive a bye into the second round.

1. (Italy) Jannik Sinner (champion)
2. (Germany) Alexander Zverev (fourth round)
3. (Spain) Carlos Alcaraz (quarterfinals)
4. (Serbia) Novak Djokovic (final)
5. Daniil Medvedev (quarterfinals)
6. Andrey Rublev (second round)
7. (United States) Taylor Fritz (semifinals)
8. (Norway) Casper Ruud (second round)
9. (Bulgaria) Grigor Dimitrov (fourth round)
10. (Greece) Stefanos Tsitsipas (fourth round)
11. (United States) Tommy Paul (fourth round)
12. (Denmark) Holger Rune (fourth round)
13. (United States) Frances Tiafoe (third round)
14. (United States) Ben Shelton (fourth round)
15. (Italy) Lorenzo Musetti (second round)
16. (France) Ugo Humbert (third round)
17. (United Kingdom) Jack Draper (withdrew)
18. (Canada) Félix Auger-Aliassime (second round)
19. (Chile) Alejandro Tabilo (third round)
20. (Australia) Alexei Popyrin (third round)
21. (France) Arthur Fils (second round)
22. (Argentina) Sebastián Báez (second round)
23. (Kazakhstan) Alexander Bublik (second round)
24. Karen Khachanov (second round)
25. (Chile) Nicolás Jarry (second round)
26. (Australia) Jordan Thompson (second round)
27. (Argentina) Francisco Cerúndolo (second round)
28. (Italy) Flavio Cobolli (third round)
29. (Italy) Matteo Arnaldi (third round)
30. (Czech Republic) Tomáš Macháč (semifinals)
31. (Argentina) Tomás Martín Etcheverry (third round)
32. (United States) Brandon Nakashima (second round)
33. (Czech Republic) Jiří Lehečka (third round)

Click on the seed number of a player to go to their draw section.

== Draw ==
Key

- Q = Qualifier
- WC = Wild card
- LL = Lucky loser
- Alt = Alternate
- ITF = ITF entry
- PR = Protected ranking
- SR = Special ranking
- SE = Special exempt
- JE = Junior exempt
- JR = Junior Accelerator Programme entrant
- CO = College Accelerator Programme entrant
- NG = Next Gen Accelerator Program entrant
- w/o = Walkover
- r = Retired
- d = Defaulted

=== Finals ===
Quarterfinals
1	(Italy) Jannik Sinner	6	6
5	Daniil Medvedev	1	4
3	(Spain) Carlos Alcaraz	6^{5}	5
30	(Czech Republic) Tomáš Macháč	7^{7}	7
(Czech Republic) Jakub Menšík	7^{7}	1	4
4	(Serbia) Novak Djokovic	6^{4}	6	6
7	(United States) Taylor Fritz	6	6
(Belgium) David Goffin	3	4

Semifinals
1	(Italy) Jannik Sinner	6	7
30	(Czech Republic) Tomáš Macháč	4	5
4	(Serbia) Novak Djokovic	6	7^{8}
7	(United States) Taylor Fritz	4	6^{6}

Final
1	(Italy) Jannik Sinner	7^{7}	6
4	(Serbia) Novak Djokovic	6^{4}	3

=== Top half ===
==== Section 1 ====
First round
Q	E Gerasimov	7^{7}	3	4
(Japan) T Daniel	6^{5}	6	6
PR	(Spain) P Carreño Busta	6^{5}	2
(Netherlands) B van de Zandschulp	7^{7}	6
(Spain) R Bautista Agut	6	3	2
(Spain) R Carballés Baena	3	6	6
(Italy) L Sonego	6^{5}	6^{8}
Q	(Canada) D Shapovalov	7^{7}	7^{10}

Second round
1	(Italy) J Sinner	6	6
(Japan) T Daniel	1	4
(Netherlands) B van de Zandschulp	6^{5}	6	5
31	(Argentina) TM Etcheverry	7^{7}	3	7
21	(France) A Fils	6^{4}	6^{5}
(Spain) R Carballés Baena	7^{7}	7^{7}
Q	(Canada) D Shapovalov	3	5
14	(United States) B Shelton	6	7

Third round
1	(Italy) J Sinner	6^{3}	6	6
31	(Argentina) TM Etcheverry	7^{7}	4	2
(Spain) R Carballés Baena	3	4
14	(United States) B Shelton	6	6

Fourth round
1	(Italy) J Sinner	6	7^{7}
14	(United States) B Shelton	4	6^{1}

==== Section 2 ====
First round
WC	(Japan) K Nishikori	3	6	6
(Argentina) M Navone	6	4	3
(Italy) L Nardi	6	1	1
(France) A Müller	4	6	6
(France) A Mannarino	3	6	0
Q	(United States) Z Svajda	6	1	6
(Brazil) T Seyboth Wild	6	4	7^{7}
Q	(United Kingdom) D Evans	2	6	6^{3}

Second round
10	(Greece) S Tsitsipas	7^{8}	6
WC	(Japan) K Nishikori	6^{6}	4
(France) A Müller	6	6
18	(Canada) F Auger-Aliassime	3	2
29	(Italy) M Arnaldi	6^{2}	6	6
Q	(United States) Z Svajda	7^{7}	2	4
(Brazil) T Seyboth Wild	5	5
5	D Medvedev	7	7

Third round
10	(Greece) S Tsitsipas	6	7
(France) A Müller	3	5
29	(Italy) M Arnaldi	7	4	4
5	D Medvedev	5	6	6

Fourth round
10	(Greece) S Tsitsipas	6^{3}	3
5	D Medvedev	7^{7}	6

==== Section 3 ====
First round
(China) J Shang	6	6
WC	(Hong Kong) C Wong	4	4
WC	(China) Y Wu	6	6
(India) S Nagal	3	3
(France) G Monfils	6	6
(Bosnia and Herzegovina) D Džumhur	4	3
PR	(Croatia) M Čilić	4	4
(France) A Cazaux	6	6

Second round
3	(Spain) C Alcaraz	6	6
(China) J Shang	2	2
WC	(China) Y Wu	6	6
25	(Chile) N Jarry	2	1
22	(Argentina) S Báez	3	6	4
(France) G Monfils	6	4	6
(France) A Cazaux	3	2
16	(France) U Humbert	6	6

Third round
3	(Spain) C Alcaraz	7^{7}	6
WC	(China) Y Wu	6^{5}	3
(France) G Monfils	7^{9}	2	6
16	(France) U Humbert	6^{7}	6	1

Fourth round
3	(Spain) C Alcaraz	6	7
(France) G Monfils	4	5

==== Section 4 ====
First round
(Italy) F Fognini	6	6^{5}	6
(Italy) L Darderi	4	7^{7}	4
PR	(United States) R Opelka	4	6^{5}
(France) A Rinderknech	6	7^{7}
(Spain) A Davidovich Fokina	7	7^{9}
Q	(Canada) G Diallo	5	6^{7}
Q	(Australia) A Vukic	2	6	6
(France) C Moutet	6	3	4

Second round
11	(United States) T Paul	6	6
(Italy) F Fognini	1	3
(France) A Rinderknech	3	2
19	(Chile) A Tabilo	6	6
30	(Czech Republic) T Macháč	1	7^{7}	6
(Spain) A Davidovich Fokina	6	6^{3}	4
Q	(Australia) A Vukic	6	6
8	(Norway) C Ruud	4	4

Third round
11	(United States) T Paul	6^{2}	7^{8}	6
19	(Chile) A Tabilo	7^{7}	6^{6}	2
30	(Czech Republic) T Macháč	6	6
Q	(Australia) A Vukic	4	2

Fourth round
11	(United States) T Paul	6	4	3
30	(Czech Republic) T Macháč	3	6	6

=== Bottom half ===
==== Section 5 ====
First round
(Czech Republic) J Menšík	6	5	6
(Spain) P Martínez	1	7	4
Q	(India) R Ramanathan	1	6^{3}
(Kazakhstan) A Shevchenko	6	7^{7}
(Serbia) M Kecmanović	6	6
(Australia) R Hijikata	2	2
(China) Z Zhang	4	3
(Belgium) Z Bergs	6	6

Second round
6	A Rublev	7^{9}	4	3
(Czech Republic) J Menšík	6^{7}	6	6
(Kazakhstan) A Shevchenko	7^{9}	7
27	(Argentina) F Cerúndolo	6^{7}	5
20	(Australia) A Popyrin	6	6
(Serbia) M Kecmanović	3	2
(Belgium) Z Bergs	3	6	2
9	(Bulgaria) G Dimitrov	6	3	6

Third round
(Czech Republic) J Menšík	6	6^{5}	6
(Kazakhstan) A Shevchenko	1	7^{7}	2
20	(Australia) A Popyrin	6^{5}	2
9	(Bulgaria) G Dimitrov	7^{7}	6

Fourth round
(Czech Republic) J Menšík	6	3	6
9	(Bulgaria) G Dimitrov	3	6	4

==== Section 6 ====
First round
(Japan) Y Nishioka	4^{r}
WC	(China) Y Zhou	2
Q	(Kazakhstan) B Zhukayev	6^{0}	4
R Safiullin	7^{7}	6
WC	(Switzerland) S Wawrinka	7^{7}	7^{8}
(France) G Mpetshi Perricard	6^{2}	6^{6}
(United States) A Michelsen	6	6
SE	(China) Y Bu	3	4

Second round
13	(United States) F Tiafoe	6	6
WC	(China) Y Zhou	2	4
R Safiullin	6	6
23	(Kazakhstan) A Bublik	4	2
28	(Italy) F Cobolli	6^{6}	7^{7}	6
WC	(Switzerland) S Wawrinka	7^{8}	6^{4}	3
(United States) A Michelsen	6^{3}	6^{9}
4	(Serbia) N Djokovic	7^{7}	7^{11}

Third round
13	(United States) F Tiafoe	7	5	6^{5}
R Safiullin	5	7	7^{7}
28	(Italy) F Cobolli	1	2
4	(Serbia) N Djokovic	6	6

Fourth round
R Safiullin	3	2
4	(Serbia) N Djokovic	6	6

==== Section 7 ====
First round
(United States) A Kovacevic	4	6^{4}
Q	(France) T Atmane	6	7^{7}
P Kotov	7^{8}	4	5
Q	(Japan) Y Watanuki	6^{6}	6	7
(Spain) J Munar	6	6
(France) H Gaston	3	3
(Australia) C O'Connell	6^{9}	6^{6}
(Italy) M Berrettini	7^{11}	7^{8}

Second round
7	(United States) T Fritz	7^{7}	7^{7}
Q	(France) T Atmane	6^{4}	6^{5}
Q	(Japan) Y Watanuki	7^{7}	6
32	(United States) B Nakashima	6^{4}	3
33	(Czech Republic) J Lehečka	7^{8}	6
(Spain) J Munar	6^{6}	4
(Italy) M Berrettini	6	4	3
12	(Denmark) H Rune	4	6	6

Third round
7	(United States) T Fritz	6	6
Q	(Japan) Y Watanuki	3	4
33	(Czech Republic) J Lehečka	4	5
12	(Denmark) H Rune	6	7

Fourth round
7	(United States) T Fritz	6	6
12	(Denmark) H Rune	1	2

==== Section 8 ====
First round
(Belgium) D Goffin	6	6
(Australia) J Duckworth	4	2
Q	(Australia) L Tu	1	6^{4}
(United States) M Giron	6	7^{7}
(Netherlands) T Griekspoor	6	6^{6}	6
(Argentina) F Díaz Acosta	4	7^{8}	3
Q	(Italy) M Bellucci	6	6
LL	(United Kingdom) B Harris	3	4

Second round
15	(Italy) L Musetti	6	6^{6}	2
(Belgium) D Goffin	1	7^{8}	6
(United States) M Giron	6	6
24	K Khachanov	4	3
26	(Australia) J Thompson	3	2
(Netherlands) T Griekspoor	6	6
Q	(Italy) M Bellucci	4	2
2	(Germany) A Zverev	6	6

Third round
(Belgium) D Goffin	1	6	7
(United States) M Giron	6	3	5
(Netherlands) T Griekspoor	6^{6}	6	6^{5}
2	(Germany) A Zverev	7^{8}	2	7^{7}

Fourth round
(Belgium) D Goffin	6	7
2	(Germany) A Zverev	4	5

== Seeded players ==
The following are the seeded players. Seedings are based on ATP rankings as of 23 September 2024. Rankings and points before are as of 30 September 2024.

Seed	Rank	Player	Points before	Points dropping	Points won	Points after	Status
1	1	(Italy) Jannik Sinner	11,010	90	1,000	11,920	Champion, defeated (Serbia) Novak Djokovic [4]
2	3	(Germany) Alexander Zverev	6,705	10	100	6,795	Fourth round lost to (Belgium) David Goffin
3	2	(Spain) Carlos Alcaraz	7,010	90	200	7,120	Quarterfinals lost to (Czech Republic) Tomáš Macháč [30]
4	4	(Serbia) Novak Djokovic	5,560	0	650	6,210	Runner-up, lost to (Italy) Jannik Sinner [1]
5	5	Daniil Medvedev	5,375	45	200	5,530	Quarterfinals lost to (Italy) Jannik Sinner [1]
6	6	Andrey Rublev	4,700	600	10	4,110	Second round lost to (Czech Republic) Jakub Menšík
7	7	(United States) Taylor Fritz	4,060	45	400	4,415	Semifinals lost to (Serbia) Novak Djokovic [4]
8	9	(Norway) Casper Ruud	3,965	90	10	3,885	Second round lost to (Australia) Aleksandar Vukic [Q]
9	10	(Bulgaria) Grigor Dimitrov	3,840	360	100	3,580	Fourth round lost to (Czech Republic) Jakub Menšík
10	12	(Greece) Stefanos Tsitsipas	3,390	45	100	3,445	Fourth round lost to Daniil Medvedev [5]
11	13	(United States) Tommy Paul	3,045	90	100	3,055	Fourth round lost to (Czech Republic) Tomáš Macháč [30]
12	14	(Denmark) Holger Rune	2,935	(50)^{†}	100	2,985	Fourth round lost to (United States) Taylor Fritz [7]
13	17	(United States) Frances Tiafoe	2,560	10	50	2,600	Third round lost to Roman Safiullin
14	16	(United States) Ben Shelton	2,580	180	100	2,500	Fourth round lost to (Italy) Jannik Sinner [1]
15	18	(Italy) Lorenzo Musetti	2,425	10	10	2,425	Second round lost to (Belgium) David Goffin
16	15	(France) Ugo Humbert	2,645	180	50	2,515	Third round lost to (France) Gaël Monfils
17	20	(United Kingdom) Jack Draper	2,340	(20)^{‡}	0	2,320	Withdrew due to abdominal injury
18	22	(Canada) Félix Auger-Aliassime	2,170	(25)^{†}	10	2,155	Second round lost to (France) Alexandre Müller
19	23	(Chile) Alejandro Tabilo	1,963	(30)^{§}	50	1,983	Third round lost to (United States) Tommy Paul [11]
20	24	(Australia) Alexei Popyrin	1,825	10	50	1,865	Third round lost to (Bulgaria) Grigor Dimitrov [9]
21	21	(France) Arthur Fils	2,250	45	10	2,215	Second round lost to (Spain) Roberto Carballés Baena
22	26	(Argentina) Sebastián Báez	1,760	45	10	1,725	Second round lost to (France) Gaël Monfils
23	27	(Kazakhstan) Alexander Bublik	1,690	0	10	1,700	Second round lost to Roman Safiullin
24	25	Karen Khachanov	1,780	45	10	1,745	Second round lost to (United States) Marcos Giron
25	29	(Chile) Nicolás Jarry	1,555	180	10	1,385	Second round lost to (China) Wu Yibing [WC]
26	28	(Australia) Jordan Thompson	1,571	10	10	1,571	Second round lost to (Netherlands) Tallon Griekspoor
27	31	(Argentina) Francisco Cerúndolo	1,550	90	10	1,470	Second round lost to (Kazakhstan) Alexander Shevchenko
28	30	(Italy) Flavio Cobolli	1,552	(75)^{‡}	50	1,527	Third round lost to (Serbia) Novak Djokovic [4]
29	36	(Italy) Matteo Arnaldi	1,350	45	50	1,355	Third round lost to Daniil Medvedev [5]
30	33	(Czech Republic) Tomáš Macháč	1,449	(100)^{‡}	400	1,749	Semifinals lost to (Italy) Jannik Sinner [1]
31	37	(Argentina) Tomás Martín Etcheverry	1,335	10	50	1,375	Third round lost to (Italy) Jannik Sinner [1]
32	35	(United States) Brandon Nakashima	1,375	45	10	1,340	Second round lost to (Japan) Yosuke Watanuki [Q]
33	34	(Czech Republic) Jiří Lehečka	1,400	10	50	1,440	Third round lost to (Denmark) Holger Rune [12]

† The player's 2023 points were replaced by a better result for purposes of his ranking as of 30 September 2024. Points for his 19th best result will be deducted instead.
‡ The player did not qualify for the tournament in 2023. He is defending points from an ATP Challenger Tour event (Mouilleron-le-Captif or Lisbon) instead.
§ The player did not qualify for the tournament in 2023. Points from his 19th best result will be deducted instead.

=== Withdrawn players ===
The following players would have been seeded, but withdrew before the tournament began.

Rank	Player	Points before	Points dropping	Points after	Withdrawal reason
8	(Poland) Hubert Hurkacz	4,060	1,000	3,060	Knee injury
11	(Australia) Alex de Minaur	3,620	10	3,610	Hip injury
19	(United States) Sebastian Korda	2,380	360	2,020	Elbow injury
32	(Portugal) Nuno Borges	1,515	10+60	1,456^{†}	Wrist injury

† Points after include 11 points as replacement for points dropping from an ATP Challenger Tour tournament held during the second week of the 2023 tournament.

== Other entrants ==
=== Wildcards ===
- (Japan) Kei Nishikori
- (Switzerland) Stan Wawrinka
- (Hong Kong) Coleman Wong
- (China) Wu Yibing
- (China) Zhou Yi

=== Special exempt ===
- (China) Bu Yunchaokete

=== Protected ranking ===
- (Spain) Pablo Carreño Busta
- (Croatia) Marin Čilić
- (United States) Reilly Opelka

=== Withdrawals ===
- ‡ (Portugal) Nuno Borges → replaced by (Bosnia and Herzegovina) Damir Džumhur
- ‡ (Australia) Alex de Minaur → replaced by (Spain) Jaume Munar
- § (United Kingdom) Jack Draper → replaced by (United Kingdom) Billy Harris (LL)
- ‡ (Poland) Hubert Hurkacz → replaced by (Australia) Christopher O'Connell
- ‡ (United States) Sebastian Korda → replaced by (France) Alexandre Müller
- ‡ (Serbia) Dušan Lajović → replaced by (Belgium) Zizou Bergs
- ‡ (Hungary) Fábián Marozsán → replaced by (Japan) Taro Daniel
- ‡ (Brazil) Thiago Monteiro → replaced by (France) Arthur Cazaux
- ‡ (United Kingdom) Cameron Norrie → replaced by (Belgium) David Goffin
- ‡ (Austria) Sebastian Ofner → replaced by (United States) Aleksandar Kovacevic
- ‡ (Germany) Jan-Lennard Struff → replaced by (Italy) Luca Nardi

‡ – withdrew from entry list
§ – withdrew from main draw

== Qualifying ==
=== Seeds ===
1. (Germany) Yannick Hanfmann (first round)
2. (Australia) Aleksandar Vukic (qualified)
3. (Australia) Adam Walton (qualifying competition)
4. (Croatia) Borna Ćorić (first round)
5. (Kazakhstan) Mikhail Kukushkin (first round, retired)
6. (Canada) Denis Shapovalov (qualified)
7. (Italy) Mattia Bellucci (qualified)
8. (United Kingdom) Billy Harris (qualifying competition, lucky loser)
9. (Canada) Gabriel Diallo (qualified)
10. (Germany) Maximilian Marterer (first round)
11. (Finland) Otto Virtanen (first round)
12. (Chinese Taipei) Tseng Chun-hsin (first round)
13. (South Africa) Lloyd Harris (withdrew)
14. (United States) Zachary Svajda (qualified)
15. (Japan) Yasutaka Uchiyama (first round)
16. (Argentina) Marco Trungelliti (qualifying competition)
17. Aslan Karatsev (qualifying competition)
18. (France) Ugo Blanchet (first round)
19. (South Korea) Hong Seong-chan (qualifying competition)
20. (United States) Mitchell Krueger (qualifying competition)
21. (Japan) Shintaro Mochizuki (first round)
22. (Spain) Alejandro Moro Cañas (qualifying competition)
23. (France) Térence Atmane (qualified)
24. (Japan) Sho Shimabukuro (qualifying competition, retired)

=== Qualifiers ===
1. (United Kingdom) Dan Evans
2. (Australia) Aleksandar Vukic
3. (France) Térence Atmane
4. (India) Ramkumar Ramanathan
5. (Australia) Li Tu
6. (Canada) Denis Shapovalov
7. (Italy) Mattia Bellucci
8. (Kazakhstan) Beibit Zhukayev
9. (Canada) Gabriel Diallo
10. Egor Gerasimov
11. (Japan) Yosuke Watanuki
12. (United States) Zachary Svajda

=== Lucky loser ===
1. (United Kingdom) Billy Harris

=== Qualifying draw ===
==== First qualifier ====
First round
1	(Germany) Yannick Hanfmann	6^{1}	4
(Australia) Alex Bolt	7^{7}	6
(United Kingdom) Dan Evans	6^{5}	6	6
15	(Japan) Yasutaka Uchiyama	7^{7}	1	4

Qualifying competition
(Australia) Alex Bolt	2	6	5
(United Kingdom) Dan Evans	6	1	7

==== Second qualifier ====
First round
2	(Australia) Aleksandar Vukic	6	7^{7}
(United States) Maxime Cressy	4	6^{3}
(Czech Republic) Dalibor Svrčina	5	5
20	(United States) Mitchell Krueger	7	7

Qualifying competition
2	(Australia) Aleksandar Vukic	6	6
20	(United States) Mitchell Krueger	4	4

==== Third qualifier ====
First round
3/WC	(Australia) Adam Walton	6	7^{10}
(Poland) Maks Kaśnikowski	1	6^{8}
WC	(China) Te Rigele	4	6^{2}
23	(France) Térence Atmane	6	7^{7}

Qualifying competition
3/WC	(Australia) Adam Walton	7^{7}	4	4
23	(France) Térence Atmane	6^{4}	6	6

==== Fourth qualifier ====
First round
4	(Croatia) Borna Ćorić	7^{7}	1	6^{9}
WC	(China) Sun Fajing	6^{5}	6	7^{11}
Alt	(India) Ramkumar Ramanathan	6	4	6
18	(France) Ugo Blanchet	4	6	4

Qualifying competition
WC	(China) Sun Fajing	2	4
Alt	(India) Ramkumar Ramanathan	6	6

==== Fifth qualifier ====
First round
5	(Kazakhstan) Mikhail Kukushkin	5	2^{r}
(Australia) Li Tu	7	4
WC	(China) Xiao Linang	6	6
21	(Japan) Shintaro Mochizuki	2	3

Qualifying competition
(Australia) Li Tu	6	6
WC	(China) Xiao Linang	2	2

==== Sixth qualifier ====
First round
6	(Canada) Denis Shapovalov	6	6
(Chinese Taipei) Hsu Yu-hsiou	3	3
(Kazakhstan) Denis Yevseyev	7^{8}	4	1
24	(Japan) Sho Shimabukuro	6^{6}	6	6

Qualifying competition
6	(Canada) Denis Shapovalov	4	3
24	(Japan) Sho Shimabukuro	6	1^{r}

==== Seventh qualifier ====
First round
7	(Italy) Mattia Bellucci	7	7^{7}
(Japan) Yuta Shimizu	5	6^{2}
(Tunisia) Aziz Dougaz	7^{7}	4	4
17	Aslan Karatsev	6^{2}	6	6

Qualifying competition
7	(Italy) Mattia Bellucci	7^{7}	6
17	Aslan Karatsev	6^{3}	1

==== Eighth qualifier ====
First round
8	(United Kingdom) Billy Harris	6	6
(Ukraine) Vadym Ursu	2	4
(Kazakhstan) Beibit Zhukayev	6	6
Alt	(South Africa) Kris van Wyk	3	2

Qualifying competition
8	(United Kingdom) Billy Harris	5	6	4
(Kazakhstan) Beibit Zhukayev	7	2	6

==== Ninth qualifier ====
First round
9	(Canada) Gabriel Diallo	6	7^{7}
(Lebanon) Benjamin Hassan	0	6^{3}
WC	(China) Cui Jie	4	2
16	(Argentina) Marco Trungelliti	6	6

Qualifying competition
9	(Canada) Gabriel Diallo	6	7
16	(Argentina) Marco Trungelliti	3	5

==== Tenth qualifier ====
First round
10	(Germany) Maximilian Marterer	6^{4}	6	3
Egor Gerasimov	7^{7}	4	6
Alibek Kachmazov	3	2
22	(Spain) Alejandro Moro Cañas	6	6

Qualifying competition
Egor Gerasimov	6^{3}	6	7^{8}
22	(Spain) Alejandro Moro Cañas	7^{7}	3	6^{6}

==== Eleventh qualifier ====
First round
11	(Finland) Otto Virtanen	7^{7}	2	0
PR	(Japan) Yosuke Watanuki	6^{4}	6	6
(Ukraine) Illya Marchenko	6^{5}	4
19	(South Korea) Hong Seong-chan	7^{7}	6

Qualifying competition
PR	(Japan) Yosuke Watanuki	6	7
19	(South Korea) Hong Seong-chan	2	5

==== Twelfth qualifier ====
First round
12	(Chinese Taipei) Tseng Chun-hsin	4	6	5
(China) Bai Yan	6	3	7
(Chinese Taipei) Wu Tung-lin	0	1
14	(United States) Zachary Svajda	6	6

Qualifying competition
(China) Bai Yan	2	2
14	(United States) Zachary Svajda	6	6
