= 2024 Hangzhou Challenger =

- Date: 7 – 13 October
- Edition: 1st
- Surface: Hard
- Location: Hangzhou, China

Champions

Singles
- (Australia) James Duckworth

Doubles
- (China) Sun Fajing / (China) Te Rigele
| Hangzhou Challenger | · 2025 → |

The 2024 Hangzhou Challenger was a professional tennis tournament played on outdoor hardcourts. It was the first edition of the tournament which was part of the 2024 ATP Challenger Tour. It took place in Hangzhou, China between 7 and 13 October 2024.

== Singles main draw entrants ==
=== Seeds ===
| Country | Player | Rank^{1} | Seed |
|---|---|---|---|
| AUS | James Duckworth | 75 | 1 |
| AUS | Rinky Hijikata | 78 | 2 |
| ITA | Fabio Fognini | 81 | 3 |
| FRA | Arthur Cazaux | 92 | 4 |
| AUS | Adam Walton | 95 | 5 |
| CAN | Gabriel Diallo | 105 | 6 |
| GBR | Billy Harris | 106 | 7 |
| TPE | Tseng Chun-hsin | 116 | 8 |

- ^{1} Rankings are as of 30 September 2024.

=== Other entrants ===
The following players received wildcards into the singles main draw:

- (China) Cui Jie
- (Italy) Fabio Fognini
- (China) Te Rigele

The following players received entry into the singles main draw as alternates:

- (India) Ramkumar Ramanathan
- (China) Sun Fajing

The following players received entry from the qualifying draw:

- (Georgia (country)) Aleksandre Bakshi
- Petr Bar Biryukov
- (Chinese Taipei) Ray Ho
- (Thailand) Kasidit Samrej
- (Japan) Yusuke Takahashi
- (China) Zhang Tianhui

== Champions ==
=== Singles ===
- (Australia) James Duckworth def. (United States) Mackenzie McDonald 2–6, 7–6^{(7–5)}, 6–4.

=== Doubles ===
- (China) Sun Fajing / (China) Te Rigele def. (Australia) Thomas Fancutt / (Japan) Yuta Shimizu 6–3, 7–5.
