= 2024 Rolex Shanghai Masters =

- Date: 2–13 October 2024
- Edition: 13th
- Category: ATP Tour Masters 1000
- Surface: Hard / outdoor
- Location: Shanghai, China
- Venue: Qizhong Forest Sports City Arena

Champions

Singles
- (Italy) Jannik Sinner

Doubles
- (Netherlands) Wesley Koolhof / (Croatia) Nikola Mektić
← 2023 ·	Shanghai Masters	· 2025 →

The 2024 Rolex Shanghai Masters was a tennis tournament played on outdoor hard courts. It was the 13th edition of the Shanghai Masters, classified as an ATP Masters 1000 event on the 2024 ATP Tour. It took place at Qizhong Forest Sports City Arena in Shanghai, China from 2 to 13 October 2024.

== Champions ==
=== Singles ===
- (Italy) Jannik Sinner def. (Serbia) Novak Djokovic, 7–6^{(7–4)}, 6–3

=== Doubles ===
- (Netherlands) Wesley Koolhof / (Croatia) Nikola Mektić def. (Argentina) Máximo González / (Argentina) Andrés Molteni, 6–4, 6–4
