= Sun Fajing =

Chinese tennis player (born 1996)

Sun Fajing 孙发京
- Country (sports): China
- Residence: Beijing, China
- Born: 3 October 1996 (age 30) Shanxi, China
- Height: 1.78 m (5 ft 10 in)
- Plays: Right-handed (two-handed backhand)
- Coach: Juan Manuel Esparcia
- Prize money: US $485,762

Singles
- Career record: 1–4 (at ATP Tour level, Grand Slam level, and in Davis Cup)
- Career titles: 0
- Highest ranking: No. 197 (4 May 2026)
- Current ranking: No. 314 (21 September 2026)

Grand Slam singles results
- French Open: Q1 (2026)
- Wimbledon: Q1 (2025)
- US Open: Q2 (2025)

Doubles
- Career record: 3–9 (at ATP Tour level, Grand Slam level, and in Davis Cup)
- Career titles: 3 Challengers
- Highest ranking: No. 181 (26 February 2024)
- Current ranking: No. 252 (4 May 2026)
- Last updated on: 4 May 2026.

Sun Fajing (Chinese: 孙发京; pinyin: Sūn Fājīng; Mandarin pronunciation: [swə́n fá tɕíŋ]; born 3 October 1996) is a Chinese tennis player. Sun has a career high ATP singles ranking of world No. 197 achieved on 4 May 2026 and a career high ATP doubles ranking of world No. 181 achieved on 26 February 2024. He is the current No. 4 Chinese player.

== Career ==
Sun made his ATP main draw debut at the 2016 Chengdu Open, where he was granted a wildcard entry in the doubles draw alongside compatriot He Yecong. They were defeated in the first round by Raven Klaasen and Rajeev Ram in straight sets.

The following year, he was again given a wildcard at the 2017 Chengdu Open with partner Te Rigele, and again he would lose in the first round to Nenad Zimonjic and Santiago Gonzalez in straight sets.

In his third main draw appearance, he and partner Zhizhen Zhang were given a wildcard entry into the doubles draw of the 2018 ATP Shenzhen Open but lost in the first round to Marcin Matkowski and Nicholas Monroe.

His fourth and most recent ATP appearance (also his third at the tournament) was a wildcard entry into the doubles draw of the 2019 Chengdu Open pairing up with Wang Aoran, and to round up an 0–4 record he lost to Dominic Inglot and Austin Krajicek.

He was given a wildcard at the 2023 China Open partnering Zhou Yi. He received a wildcard in doubles partnering Li Zhe at the 2023 Rolex Shanghai Masters and also a qualifying wildcard in singles at the 2024 Rolex Shanghai Masters where he upset fourth seed Borna Ćorić in the first round of qualifying but lost in the second in straight sets to alternate player Ramkumar Ramanathan.

Fajing Sun reached the top 200 on 19 May 2025, following his maiden Challenger title at the 2025 Wuxi Open.

== Performance timeline ==
Key
W	F	SF	QF	#R	RR	Q#	DNQ	A	NH

(W) winner; (F) finalist; (SF) semifinalist; (QF) quarterfinalist; (#R) rounds 4, 3, 2, 1; (RR) round-robin stage; (Q#) qualification round; (DNQ) did not qualify; (A) absent; (NH) not held; (SR) strike rate (events won / competed); (W–L) win–loss record.
To avoid confusion and double counting, these charts are updated at the conclusion of a tournament or when the player's participation has ended.

=== Singles ===
Tournament	2015	2016	2017	2018	2019	2020	2021	2022	2023	2024	2025	2026	SR	W–L	Win %
Grand Slam tournaments
Australian Open	A	A	A	A	A	A	A	A	A	A	A	A	0 / 0	0–0	–
French Open	A	A	A	A	A	A	A	A	A	A	A	Q1	0 / 0	0–0	–
Wimbledon	A	A	A	A	A	NH	A	A	A	A	Q1	A	0 / 0	0–0	–
US Open	A	A	A	A	A	A	A	A	A	A	Q2	A	0 / 0	0–0	–
Win–loss	0–0	0–0	0–0	0–0	0–0	0–0	0–0	0–0	0–0	0–0	0–0	0–0	0 / 0	0–0	–
ATP Masters 1000
Indian Wells Masters	A	A	A	A	A	NH	A	A	A	A	A	A	0 / 0	0–0	–
Miami Open	A	A	A	A	A	NH	A	A	A	A	A	A	0 / 0	0–0	–
Monte Carlo Masters	A	A	A	A	A	NH	A	A	A	A	A	A	0 / 0	0–0	–
Madrid Open	A	A	A	A	A	NH	A	A	A	A	A	A	0 / 0	0-0	–
Italian Open	A	A	A	A	A	A	A	A	A	A	A	A	0 / 0	0–0	–
Canadian Open	A	A	A	A	A	NH	A	A	A	A	A		0 / 0	0–0	–
Cincinnati Masters	A	A	A	A	A	A	A	A	A	A	A		0 / 0	0–0	–
Shanghai Masters	Q1	A	Q1	A	Q1	NH			Q2	Q2	Q1		0 / 0	0–0	–
Paris Masters	A	A	A	A	A	A	A	A	A	A	A		0 / 0	0–0	–
Win–loss	0–0	0–0	0–0	0–0	0–0	0–0	0–0	0–0	0–0	0–0	0–0		0 / 0	0–0	–

== ATP Challenger Tour finals ==
=== Singles: 3 (2 titles, 1 runner-up) ===
Finals by surface
Hard (2–1)
Clay (0–0)

Result	W–L	Date	Tournament	Tier	Surface	Partner	Score
Win	1–0	May 2025	Wuxi Open, China	Challenger	Hard	(Australia) Alex Bolt	7–6^{(7–4)}, 6–4
Loss	1–1	Jul 2025	Open de Tenis Ciudad de Pozoblanco, Spain	Challenger	Hard	(Spain) Daniel Mérida	3–6, 4–6
Win	2–1	Apr 2026	Wuning Challenger, China	Challenger	Hard	(Australia) Li Tu	5–7, 6–4, 7–5

=== Doubles: 9 (5 titles, 4 runner-ups) ===
Finals by surface
Hard (5–4)
Clay (0–0)

Result	W–L	Date	Tournament	Tier	Surface	Partner	Opponents	Score
Win	1–0	Oct 2017	Suzhou, China	Challenger	Hard	(China) Xin Gao	(China) Gong Maoxin (China) Zhang Ze	7–6^{(7–5)}, 4–6, [10–7]
Win	2–0	Sep 2019	Shanghai, China	Challenger	Hard	(China) Xin Gao	(Australia) Marc Polmans (Australia) Scott Puodziunas	2–6, 6–4, [10–7]
Loss	2–1	Jul 2023	Segovia, Spain	Challenger	Hard	(Philippines) Francis Casey Alcantara	(France) Dan Added (France) Pierre-Hugues Herbert	6–4, 3–6, [10–12]
Loss	2–2	Aug 2023	Zhangjiagang, China	Challenger	Hard	(Philippines) Francis Casey Alcantara	(Chinese Taipei) Ray Ho (Australia) Matthew Romios	3–6, 4–6
Loss	2–3	Jan 2024	Nonthaburi II, Thailand	Challenger	Hard	(Philippines) Francis Casey Alcantara	(France) Manuel Guinard (France) Grégoire Jacq	4–6, 6–7^{(6–8)}
Win	3–3	Oct 2024	Hangzhou, China	Challenger	Hard	(China) Te Rigele	(Australia) Thomas Fancutt (Japan) Yuta Shimizu	6–3, 7–5
Win	4–3	Jul 2025	Pozoblanco, Spain	Challenger	Hard	(Spain) Iñaki Montes de la Torre	(Bulgaria) Anthony Genov (Israel) Roy Stepanov	6–1, 7–6^{(10–8)}
Win	5–3	Mar 2026	Yokkaichi, Japan	Challenger	Hard	(Chinese Taipei) Wu Tung-lin	(Australia) Ethan Cook (Australia) Tai Sach	7–6^{(8–6)}, 6–3
Loss	5−4	Oct 2026	Guangzhou, China	Challenger	Hard	(Chinese Taipei) Hsu Yu-hsiou	(Netherlands) Thijmen Loof (Japan) Kaito Uesugi	2–6, 2–6

== ITF Futures/World Tennis Tour finals ==
=== Singles: 20 (6 titles, 14 runner-ups) ===
Legend ITF Futures/WTT (6–14)	Finals by surface Hard (5–13) Clay (1–1) Grass (0–0) Carpet (0–0)

Result	W–L	Date	Tournament	Tier	Surface	Opponent	Score
Loss	0–1	Aug 2016	Thailand F1, Hua Hin	Futures	Hard	(Chinese Taipei) Chen Ti	3–6, 1–6
Loss	0–2	Feb 2017	Indonesia F1, Jakarta	Futures	Hard	(Chinese Taipei) Chen Ti	6–7^{(4–7)}, 3–6
Win	1–2	Apr 2017	China F5, Luzhou	Futures	Hard	(Australia) Bradley Mousley	7–6^{(7–2)}, 6–2
Loss	1–3	Mar 2018	Qatar F1, Doha	Futures	Hard	(Netherlands) Scott Griekspoor	4–6, 3–6
Loss	1–4	May 2018	China F6, Lu'an	Futures	Hard	(Finland) Patrik Niklas-Salminen	6–2, 4–6, 4–6
Loss	1–5	Feb 2019	M15 Sharm El Sheikh, Egypt	WTT	Hard	(Sweden) Filip Bergevi	6–7^{(4–7)}, 6–7^{(2–7)}
Win	2–5	May 2019	M25 Lu'an, China	WTT	Hard	(China) Cui Jie	7–5, 6–4
Loss	2–6	Jun 2019	M25 Hengyang, China	WTT	Hard	(Australia) Harry Bourchier	6–7^{(7–9)}, 1–6
Win	3–6	Jul 2019	M25 Kunshan, China	WTT	Hard	(Chinese Taipei) Yang Tsung-Hua	6–2, 6–2
Loss	3–7	Jul 2019	M25 Qujing, China	WTT	Hard	(China) Bai Yan	3–6, 1–6
Loss	3–8	Oct 2022	M15 Monastir, Tunisia	WTT	Hard	(Germany) Christoph Negritu	6–7^{(5–7)}, 6–7^{(5–7)}
Win	4–8	Jun 2023	M25 Martos, Spain	WTT	Hard	(Spain) Pedro Vives Marcos	7–6^{(7–3)}, 6–4
Win	5–8	Aug 2023	M25 Anning, China	WTT	Clay	(China) Cui Jie	6–3, 4–6, 6–2
Loss	5–9	Aug 2023	M25 Yinchuan, China	WTT	Hard	(China) Cui Jie	3–6, 5–7
Win	6–9	May 2024	M25 Lu'an, China	WTT	Hard	(China) Mo Yecong	6–3, 6–1
Loss	6–10	May 2024	M25 Baotou, China	WTT	Clay (i)	(China) Te Rigele	2–6, 4–6
Loss	6–11	Jul 2024	M25 Tianjin, China	WTT	Hard	(China) Zhou Yi	6–4, 3–6, 5–7
Loss	6–12	Aug 2024	M25 Yinchuan, China	WTT	Hard	(China) Bai Yan	4–6, 6–7^{(1–7)}
Loss	6–13	Oct 2024	M25 Huzhou, China	WTT	Hard	(China) Bai Yan	3–6, 6–4, 2–6
Loss	6–14	Oct 2024	M25 Qian Daohu, China	WTT	Hard	(Morocco) Elliot Benchetrit	3–6, 2–6

=== Doubles: 34 (16 titles, 18 runner-ups) ===
Legend ITF Futures/WTT (16–18)	Finals by surface Hard (13–14) Clay (3–4) Grass (0–0) Carpet (0–0)

Result	W–L	Date	Tournament	Tier	Surface	Partner	Opponents	Score
Loss	0–1	Feb 2016	China F1, Anning	Futures	Clay	(China) Wang Aoran	(Chinese Taipei) Lin Hsin (Spain) Enrique López Pérez	walkover
Loss	0–2	Jul 2016	China F10, Longyan	Futures	Hard	(China) Wang Aoran	(China) Bai Yan (China) Li Zhe	6–7^{(1–7)}, 4–6
Win	1–2	Jul 2016	China F11, Anning	Futures	Clay	(China) Wang Aoran	(China) Ning Yuqing (China) Qiu Zhuoyang	6–3, 6–4
Loss	1–3	Mar 2017	Egypt F8, Longyan	Futures	Hard	(Chinese Taipei) Chen Ti	(Philippines) Francis Casey Alcantara (Zimbabwe) Benjamin Lock	3–6, 7–6^{(9–7)}, [7–10]
Win	2–3	May 2017	China F8, Fuzhou	Futures	Hard	(China) Te Rigele	(United States) Alexander Sarkissian (New Zealand) Finn Tearney	6–2, 6–4
Win	3–3	Jul 2017	China F12, Shenzhen	Futures	Hard	(Vietnam) Lý Hoàng Nam	(Philippines) Francis Casey Alcantara (India) Karunuday Singh	6–4, 6–4
Loss	3–4	Dec 2017	Thailand F12, Hua Hin	Futures	Hard	(China) Xin Gao	(South Korea) Chung Hong (South Korea) Song Min-kyu	6–7^{(5–7)}, 6–3, [6–10]
Win	4–4	Mar 2018	Qatar F3, Doha	Futures	Hard	(Hong Kong) Wong Chun-hun	(Czech Republic) Matěj Vocel (Czech Republic) Marek Gengel	6–3, 6–3
Loss	4–5	May 2018	China F4, Wuhan	Futures	Hard	(China) Wang Ruikai	(China) Te Rigele (Japan) Yuta Shimizu	6–7^{(3-7)}, 3–6
Loss	4–6	Jun 2018	China F7, Luzhou	Futures	Hard	(Philippines) Francis Casey Alcantara	(Germany) Sami Reinwein (New Zealand) Rhett Purcell	5–7, 3–6
Win	5–6	Jun 2018	China F8, Yinchuan	Futures	Hard	(Philippines) Francis Casey Alcantara	(Thailand) Wishaya Trongcharoenchaikul (Japan) Kento Takeuchi	6–4, 2–6, [10–5]
Win	6–6	May 2019	M25 Wuhan, China	WTT	Hard	(China) Te Rigele	(Japan) Sora Fakuda (Japan) Yuki Mochizuki	6–1, 3–6, [12–10]
Loss	6–7	Jun 2019	M25 Luzhou, China	WTT	Hard	(China) Xin Gao	(China) Wang Aoran (China) Wu Hao	6–3, 1–6, [7–10]
Win	7–7	Jul 2019	M25 Kunshan, China	WTT	Hard	(China) Xin Gao	(China) Zeng Shihong (China) Hua Runhao	6–2, 7–6^{(7–5)}
Win	8–7	Jul 2019	M25 Qujing, China	WTT	Hard	(China) Hua Runhao	(Philippines) Francis Casey Alcantara (New Zealand) Rhett Purcell	6–1, 6–1
Win	9–7	May 2022	M25 Monastir, Tunisia	WTT	Hard	(Chinese Taipei) Hsu Yu-hsiou	(Australia) Jayden Court (Australia) Dane Sweeny	7–6^{(7–4)}, 6–3
Win	10–7	May 2022	M25 Monastir, Tunisia	WTT	Hard	(Chinese Taipei) Hsu Yu-hsiou	(Australia) Blake Bayldon (Australia) Jordan Smith	6–4, 7–6^{(7–2)}
Loss	10–8	Jun 2022	M25 Chiang Rai, Thailand	WTT	Hard	(Chinese Taipei) Hsu Yu-hsiou	(Thailand) Congsup Congcar (Japan) Shintaro Imai	4–6, 6–1, [8–10]
Win	11–8	Jul 2022	M15 Kottingbrunn, Austria	WTT	Clay	(Germany) Niklas Schell	(Italy) Stefano Battaglino (Italy) Lorenzo Rottoli	6–4, 6–2
Loss	11–9	Oct 2022	M15 Monastir, Tunisia	WTT	Hard	(United States) Bruno Kuzuhara	(Australia) James Frawley (Germany) Christoph Negritu	4–6, 6–1, [6–10]
Loss	11–10	Oct 2022	M25 Jakarta, Indonesia	WTT	Hard	(Japan) Seita Watanabe	(Australia) Thomas Fancutt (Australia) Brandon Walkin	6–4, 3–6, [6–10]
Loss	11–11	Oct 2022	M25 Jakarta, Indonesia	WTT	Hard	(Hong Kong) Coleman Wong	(Japan) Tomohiro Masabayashi (Japan) Seita Watanabe	6–4, 4–6, [7–10]
Loss	11–12	Apr 2023	M15 Singapore, Singapore	WTT	Hard	(Philippines) Francis Casey Alcantara	(Indonesia) Justin Barki (Netherlands) Igor Sijsling	1–6, 1–6
Win	12–12	Apr 2023	M25 Jakarta, Indonesia	WTT	Hard	(Chinese Taipei) Ray Ho	(Philippines) Francis Casey Alcantara (Thailand) Pruchya Isaro	6–4, 7–5
Win	13–12	Jun 2023	M25 La Nucia, Spain	WTT	Clay	(Egypt) Amr Elsayed	(Greece) Dimitris Sakellaridis (Greece) Stefanos Sakellaridis	6–2, 6–3
Win	14–12	Jul 2023	M25 Bakio, Spain	WTT	Hard	(Spain) John Echeverría	(Switzerland) Noah Lopez (France) Robin Bertrand	6–3, 6–2
Loss	14–13	Jul 2023	M25 Roda de Bara, Spain	WTT	Hard	(Spain) John Echeverría	(Spain) Pedro Vives Marcos (Spain) Alberto Barroso Campos	7–5, 3–6, [4–10]
Loss	14–14	Aug 2023	M25 Anning, China	WTT	Clay	(United States) Evan Zhu	(China) Cui Jie (China) Wang Xiaofei	6–3, 2–6, [8–10]
Win	15–14	May 2024	M25 Lu'an, China	WTT	Hard	(New Zealand) Ajeet Rai	(China) Cui Jie (South Korea) Lee Duck-hee	6–2, 6–2
Loss	15–15	May 2024	M25 Anning, China	WTT	Clay	(China) Cui Jie	(Chinese Taipei) Jeffrey Hsu (South Korea) Woobin Shin	6–2, 3–6, [5–10]
Loss	15–16	May 2024	M25 Baotou, China	WTT	Clay (i)	(China) Cui Jie	(China) Te Rigele (United States) Evan Zhu	3–6, 6–2, [6–10]
Loss	15–17	Jul 2024	M25 Tianjin, China	WTT	Hard	(South Korea) Chung Yun-seong	(Chinese Taipei) Hsu Yu-hsiou (Japan) Ryotaro Taguchi	6–3, 3–6, [12–14]
Win	16–17	Oct 2024	M25 Qian Daohu, China	WTT	Hard	(China) Te Rigele	(China) Zheng Baoluo (Chinese Taipei) Hsieh Cheng-peng	6–3, 3–6, [10–3]
Loss	16–18	Oct 2025	M25 Qian Daohu, China	WTT	Hard	(China) Fnu Nidunjianzan	(Uzbekistan) Sergey Fomin (Spain) Ignasi Forcano	2–6, 4–6
