= Te Rigele =

Chinese tennis player (born 1997)

Te Rigele 特日格乐
- Country (sports): China
- Residence: Beijing, China
- Born: 9 October 1997 (age 28) Hohhot, China
- Height: 1.88 m (6 ft 2 in)
- Plays: Right-handed (two handed-backhand)
- Coach: Yu Xinyuan
- Prize money: US $246,978

Singles
- Career record: 2–4 (at ATP Tour level, Grand Slam level, and in Davis Cup)
- Career titles: 0
- Highest ranking: No. 395 (22 October 2018)
- Current ranking: No. 835 (14 September 2026)

Doubles
- Career record: 4–7 (at ATP Tour level, Grand Slam level, and in Davis Cup)
- Career titles: 0; 1 Challenger
- Highest ranking: No. 291 (14 October 2024)
- Current ranking: No. 851 (14 September 2026)
- Last updated on: 16 September 2026.

Te Rigele

Chinese name
- Simplified Chinese: 特日格乐
Transcriptions
Standard Mandarin
- Hanyu Pinyin: Tè Rìgélè
- IPA: [tʰɤ̂ ɻɻ̩̂ kɤ̌ lɤ̂]

Mongolian name
- Mongolian script: ᠲᠡᠷᠭᠡᠯ

Te Rigele (born 9 October 1997) is a Chinese tennis player. He has a career-high ATP singles ranking of No. 395 achieved on 22 October 2018 and a career high doubles ranking of No. 291 achieved on 14 October 2024.

On the junior tour, Te had a career-high ranking of No. 48, achieved in January 2015.

== Career ==
Te made his ATP main draw debut at the 2014 ATP Shenzhen Open, in the doubles draw partnering Qiu Zhuoyang.

He received a wildcard for the singles main draw of the 2023 Rolex Shanghai Masters.

== Performance timeline ==
Key
W	F	SF	QF	#R	RR	Q#	DNQ	A	NH

(W) winner; (F) finalist; (SF) semifinalist; (QF) quarterfinalist; (#R) rounds 4, 3, 2, 1; (RR) round-robin stage; (Q#) qualification round; (DNQ) did not qualify; (A) absent; (NH) not held; (SR) strike rate (events won / competed); (W–L) win–loss record.
To avoid confusion and double counting, these charts are updated at the conclusion of a tournament or when the player's participation has ended.

=== Singles ===
Tournament	2017	2018	2019	2020	2021	2022	2023	2024	2025	2026	SR	W–L	Win %
Grand Slam tournaments
Australian Open	A	A	A	A	A	A	A	A	A		0 / 0	0–0	–
French Open	A	A	A	A	A	A	A	A	A		0 / 0	0–0	–
Wimbledon	A	A	A	NH	A	A	A	A	A		0 / 0	0–0	–
US Open	A	A	A	A	A	A	A	A	A		0 / 0	0–0	–
Win–loss	0–0	0–0	0–0	0–0	0–0	0–0	0–0	0–0	0–0		0 / 0	0–0	–
ATP Masters 1000
Indian Wells Masters	A	A	A	NH	A	A	A	A	A		0 / 0	0–0	–
Miami Open	A	A	A	NH	A	A	A	A	A		0 / 0	0–0	–
Monte Carlo Masters	A	A	A	NH	A	A	A	A	A		0 / 0	0–0	–
Madrid Open	A	A	A	NH	A	A	A	A	A		0 / 0	0-0	–
Italian Open	A	A	A	A	A	A	A	A	A		0 / 0	0–0	–
Canadian Open	A	A	A	NH	A	A	A	A	A		0 / 0	0–0	–
Cincinnati Masters	A	A	A	A	A	A	A	A	A		0 / 0	0–0	–
Shanghai Masters	Q1	Q1	A	NH			1R	Q1	Q1		0 / 1	0–1	0%
Paris Masters	A	A	A	A	A	A	A	A			0 / 0	0–0	–
Win–loss	0–0	0–0	0–0	0–0	0–0	0–0	0–1	0–0			0 / 1	0–1	0%

== ATP Challenger Tour finals ==
=== Doubles: 2 (1 title, 1 runner-up) ===
Legend ATP Challenger Tour (1–1)

Result	W–L	Date	Tournament	Tier	Surface	Partner	Opponents	Score
Loss	0–1	Sep 2023	Shanghai, China	Challenger	Hard	(China) Bu Yunchaokete	(Australia) Alex Bolt (Australia) Luke Saville	6–4, 3–6, [9–11]
Win	1–1	Oct 2024	Hangzhou, China	Challenger	Hard	(China) Sun Fajing	(Australia) Thomas Fancutt (Japan) Yuta Shimizu	6–3, 7–5

== ITF Futures/World Tennis Tour finals ==
=== Singles: 15 (9 titles, 6 runner-ups) ===
Legend ITF Futures/WTT (9–6)	Finals by surface Hard (8–3) Clay (1–3)

Result	W–L	Date	Tournament	Tier	Surface	Opponent	Score
Win	1–0	May 2018	China F4, Wuhan	Futures	Hard	(China) He Yecong	6–3, 7–6^{(7–4)}
Win	2–0	May 2018	China F5, Wuhan	Futures	Hard	(Finland) Harri Heliövaara	7–5, 6–4
Win	3–0	Jul 2018	China F10, Shenzhen	Futures	Hard	(China) Wu Yibing	4–6, 6–4, 6–3
Loss	3–1	Aug 2019	M15 Vigo, Spain	WTT	Clay	(Brazil) Oscar José Gutierrez	6–7^{(2–7)}, 6–7^{(0–7)}
Loss	3–2	May 2022	M15 Antalya, Turkey	WTT	Clay	(France) Mathys Erhard	6–2, 3–6, 3–6
Loss	3–3	Jul 2022	M15 Monastir, Tunisia	WTT	Hard	(China) Wang Xiaofei	2–6, 4–6
Loss	3–4	Jul 2022	M15 Monastir, Tunisia	WTT	Hard	(China) Mu Tao	3–6, 3–6
Win	4–4	Aug 2022	M15 Monastir, Tunisia	WTT	Hard	(Estonia) Mark Lajal	6–3, 3–6, 7–5
Win	5–4	Apr 2023	M25 Sanxenxo, Spain	WTT	Hard	(Germany) Robert Strombachs	7–6^{(7–5)}, 3–6, 7–6^{(7–3)}
Loss	5–5	May 2023	M15 Monastir, Tunisia	WTT	Hard	(Ivory Coast) Eliakim Coulibaly	2–6, 1–6
Loss	5–6	Aug 2023	M25 Baotou, China	WTT	Clay (i)	Mikalai Haliak	4–6, 7–6^{(7–4)}, 3–6
Win	6–6	May 2024	M25 Baotou, China	WTT	Clay (i)	(China) Sun Fajing	6–2, 6–4
Win	7–6	Feb 2025	M15 Maanshan, China	WTT	Hard	(China) Zhang Tianhui	6–3, 6–2
Win	8–6	Apr 2025	M15 Luan, China	WTT	Hard	(South Korea) Woobin Shin	7–6^{(7–5)} ret.
Win	9–6	Jun 2025	M15 Luan, China	WTT	Hard	(Chinese Taipei) Huang Tsung-Hao	6–1, 6–4

=== Doubles: 13 (8 titles, 5 runner-ups) ===
Legend ITF Futures/WTT (8–5)	Finals by surface Hard (5–4) Clay (3–1)

Result	W–L	Date	Tournament	Tier	Surface	Partner	Opponents	Score
Loss	0–1	Jul 2014	China F9, Zhangjiagang	Futures	Hard	(China) Qiu Zhuoyang	(South Korea) Min Hyeok Cho (South Korea) Ji Sung Nam	3–6, 4–6
Loss	0–2	Mar 2016	China F3, Anning	Futures	Clay	(China) Cui Jie	(China) Wang Chuhan (Colombia) Cristian Rodríguez	6–7^{(5–7)}, 2–6
Win	1–2	Jul 2016	China F13, Anning	Futures	Clay	(Chinese Taipei) Lee Kuan-yi	(Japan) Koichi Sano (Japan) Shunrou Takeshima	3–6, 7–5, [10–8]
Win	2–2	May 2017	China F8, Fuzhou	Futures	Hard	(China) Sun Fajing	(United States) Alexander Sarkissian (New Zealand) Finn Tearney	6–2, 6–4
Win	3–2	Jan 2018	China F1, Anning	Futures	Clay	(China) Wang Aoran	(Japan) Shinji Hazawa (Japan) Yuta Shimizu	7–5, 7–6^{(7–3)}
Win	4–2	May 2018	China F4, Wuhan	Futures	Hard	(Japan) Yuta Shimizu	(China) Sun Fajing (China) Wang Ruikai	7–6^{(7–3)}, 6–3
Loss	4–3	May 2018	China F6, Luan	Futures	Hard	(China) Gao Xin	(Finland) Harri Heliövaara (Finland) Patrik Niklas-Salminen	2–6, 3–6
Win	5–3	May 2019	M25 Wuhan, China	WTT	Hard	(China) Sun Fajing	(Japan) Sora Fakuda (Japan) Yuki Mochizuki	6–1, 3–6, [12–10]
Loss	5–4	Jun 2022	M15 Monastir, Tunisia	WTT	Hard	(China) Zhang Ze	(Tunisia) Skander Mansouri (Tunisia) Aziz Ouakaa	6–7^{(1–7)}, 2–6
Win	6–4	Jun 2022	M15 Monastir, Tunisia	WTT	Hard	(China) Zhang Ze	(Italy) Gabriele Bosio (Italy) Gabriele Maria Noce	5–7, 6–1, [11–9]
Loss	6–5	Mar 2023	M25 Saint-Dizier, France	WTT	Hard (i)	(Spain) David Jordà Sanchis	(Denmark) August Holmgren (Denmark) Christian Sigsgaard	2–6, 3–6
Win	7–5	May 2024	M25 Baotou, China	WTT	Clay (i)	(United States) Evan Zhu	(China) Sun Fajing (China) Cui Jie	6–3, 2–6, [10–6]
Win	8–5	Oct 2024	M25 Qian Daohu, China	WTT	Hard	(China) Sun Fajing	(China) Zheng Baoluo (Chinese Taipei) Hsieh Cheng-peng	6–3, 3–6, [10–3]
