= 2016 ATP Challenger Tour =

Secondary professional tennis circuit organized by the ATP

Details
- Duration: 4 January – 27 November 2016
- Edition: 39th (8th under this name)
- Tournaments: 166
- Categories: Challenger 125 (11); Challenger 110 (15); Challenger 100 (22); Challenger 90 (77); Challenger 80 (41)

Achievements (singles)
- Most titles: (Argentina) Facundo Bagnis (6)
- Most finals: (Argentina) Facundo Bagnis (Belgium) Steve Darcis (Chinese Taipei) Lu Yen-hsun (Austria) Gerald Melzer (Czech Republic) Adam Pavlásek (6)

The ATP Challenger Tour, in 2016, was the secondary professional tennis circuit organized by the ATP. The 2016 ATP Challenger Tour calendar contained 166 tournaments, with prize money ranging from $40,000 up to $125,000. It was the 39th edition of challenger tournaments cycle, and 8th under the name of Challenger Tour.

== Schedule ==
This is the complete schedule of events on the 2016 calendar, with player progression documented from the quarterfinals stage.

=== January ===
Week of	Tournament	Champions	Runners-up	Semifinalists	Quarterfinalists
January 4	Challenger BNP Paribas Nouméa; Nouméa, New Caledonia; Hard – $75,000+H – 32S/8Q/16D; Singles – Doubles	(France) Adrian Mannarino; 5–7, 6–2, 6–2	(Colombia) Alejandro Falla	(Germany) Daniel Brands (Australia) Jordan Thompson	(Republic of Ireland) James McGee (France) Quentin Halys (Argentina) Marco Trungelliti (France) Julien Benneteau
January 4	Challenger BNP Paribas Nouméa; Nouméa, New Caledonia; Hard – $75,000+H – 32S/8Q/16D; Singles – Doubles	(France) Julien Benneteau (France) Édouard Roger-Vasselin; 7–6^{(7–4)}, 3–6, [10–5]	(France) Grégoire Barrère (France) Tristan Lamasine	(Germany) Daniel Brands (Australia) Jordan Thompson	(Republic of Ireland) James McGee (France) Quentin Halys (Argentina) Marco Trungelliti (France) Julien Benneteau
January 4	City of Onkaparinga ATP Challenger; Happy Valley, Australia; Hard – $75,000 – 32S/32Q/16D; Singles – Doubles	(United States) Taylor Fritz; 7–6^{(9–7)}, 6–2	(Israel) Dudi Sela	(Hungary) Márton Fucsovics (Australia) Andrew Whittington	(Czech Republic) Jan Šátral (Japan) Hiroki Moriya (Australia) Alex Bolt (Austria) Dennis Novak
January 4	City of Onkaparinga ATP Challenger; Happy Valley, Australia; Hard – $75,000 – 32S/32Q/16D; Singles – Doubles	(Italy) Matteo Donati (Kazakhstan) Andrey Golubev; 3–6, 7–6^{(7–5)}, [10–1]	(Ukraine) Denys Molchanov (Kazakhstan) Aleksandr Nedovyesov	(Hungary) Márton Fucsovics (Australia) Andrew Whittington	(Czech Republic) Jan Šátral (Japan) Hiroki Moriya (Australia) Alex Bolt (Austria) Dennis Novak
January 4	KPN Bangkok Open; Bangkok, Thailand; Hard – $50,000+H – 32S/32Q/16D; Singles – Doubles	(Russia) Mikhail Youzhny; 6–3, 6–4	(Japan) Go Soeda	(Switzerland) Marco Chiudinelli (Russia) Konstantin Kravchuk	(Japan) Yasutaka Uchiyama (Belarus) Egor Gerasimov (Belgium) Kimmer Coppejans (Japan) Yūichi Sugita
January 4	KPN Bangkok Open; Bangkok, Thailand; Hard – $50,000+H – 32S/32Q/16D; Singles – Doubles	(Sweden) Johan Brunström (Sweden) Andreas Siljeström; 6–3, 6–4	(Germany) Gero Kretschmer (Germany) Alexander Satschko	(Switzerland) Marco Chiudinelli (Russia) Konstantin Kravchuk	(Japan) Yasutaka Uchiyama (Belarus) Egor Gerasimov (Belgium) Kimmer Coppejans (Japan) Yūichi Sugita
January 4	Torneo de Mendoza; Mendoza, Argentina; Clay – $50,000+H – 32S/32Q/16D; Singles – Doubles	(Austria) Gerald Melzer; 4–6, 6–4, 6–0	(France) Axel Michon	(Argentina) Facundo Bagnis (Spain) Roberto Carballés Baena	(Argentina) Maximiliano Estévez (Spain) Enrique López Pérez (Argentina) Guido Andreozzi (Brazil) Thiago Monteiro
January 4	Torneo de Mendoza; Mendoza, Argentina; Clay – $50,000+H – 32S/32Q/16D; Singles – Doubles	(Argentina) Máximo González (Dominican Republic) José Hernández; 4–6, 6–3, [10–1]	(Chile) Julio Peralta (Argentina) Horacio Zeballos	(Argentina) Facundo Bagnis (Spain) Roberto Carballés Baena	(Argentina) Maximiliano Estévez (Spain) Enrique López Pérez (Argentina) Guido Andreozzi (Brazil) Thiago Monteiro
January 11	Canberra Challenger; Canberra, Australia; Hard – $75,000 – 32S/32Q/16D; Singles – Doubles	(Italy) Paolo Lorenzi; 6–2, 6–4	(Croatia) Ivan Dodig	(Spain) Marcel Granollers (Spain) Daniel Muñoz de la Nava	(Russia) Evgeny Donskoy (France) Quentin Halys (Argentina) Diego Schwartzman (Colombia) Santiago Giraldo
January 11	Canberra Challenger; Canberra, Australia; Hard – $75,000 – 32S/32Q/16D; Singles – Doubles	(Poland) Mariusz Fyrstenberg (Mexico) Santiago González; 7–6^{(7–3)}, 6–3	(Australia) Maverick Banes (Australia) Jarryd Chaplin	(Spain) Marcel Granollers (Spain) Daniel Muñoz de la Nava	(Russia) Evgeny Donskoy (France) Quentin Halys (Argentina) Diego Schwartzman (Colombia) Santiago Giraldo
January 11	KPN Bangkok Open II; Bangkok, Thailand; Hard – $50,000+H – 32S/32Q/16D; Singles – Doubles	(Russia) Mikhail Youzhny; 6–4, 6–1	(Czech Republic) Adam Pavlásek	(Chinese Taipei) Jason Jung (Portugal) Frederico Ferreira Silva	(United Kingdom) Joshua Milton (Georgia (country)) Aleksandre Metreveli (South Korea) Kim Cheong-eui (Belarus) Dzmitry Zhyrmont
January 11	KPN Bangkok Open II; Bangkok, Thailand; Hard – $50,000+H – 32S/32Q/16D; Singles – Doubles	(Netherlands) Wesley Koolhof (Netherlands) Matwé Middelkoop; 6–3, 7–6^{(7–1)}	(Germany) Gero Kretschmer (Germany) Alexander Satschko	(Chinese Taipei) Jason Jung (Portugal) Frederico Ferreira Silva	(United Kingdom) Joshua Milton (Georgia (country)) Aleksandre Metreveli (South Korea) Kim Cheong-eui (Belarus) Dzmitry Zhyrmont
January 11	Racket Club Open; Buenos Aires, Argentina; Clay – $50,000+H – 32S/32Q/16D; Singles – Doubles	(Argentina) Facundo Bagnis; 6–3, 6–2	(Belgium) Arthur De Greef	(Argentina) Nicolás Kicker (Brazil) Rogério Dutra Silva	(France) Maxime Hamou (Argentina) Máximo González (Argentina) Guido Andreozzi (Austria) Gerald Melzer
January 11	Racket Club Open; Buenos Aires, Argentina; Clay – $50,000+H – 32S/32Q/16D; Singles – Doubles	(Argentina) Facundo Bagnis (Argentina) Máximo González; 6–1, 6–2	(Peru) Sergio Galdós (Sweden) Christian Lindell	(Argentina) Nicolás Kicker (Brazil) Rogério Dutra Silva	(France) Maxime Hamou (Argentina) Máximo González (Argentina) Guido Andreozzi (Austria) Gerald Melzer
January 18	Philippine Open; Manila, Philippines; Hard – $75,000 – 32S/32Q/16D; Singles – Doubles	(Russia) Mikhail Youzhny; 6–4, 6–4	(Switzerland) Marco Chiudinelli	(Japan) Go Soeda (Slovakia) Lukáš Lacko	(China) Li Zhe (France) David Guez (Netherlands) Igor Sijsling (Italy) Gianluca Naso
January 18	Philippine Open; Manila, Philippines; Hard – $75,000 – 32S/32Q/16D; Singles – Doubles	(Sweden) Johan Brunström (Denmark) Frederik Nielsen; 6–2, 6–2	(Philippines) Francis Casey Alcantara (Indonesia) Christopher Rungkat	(Japan) Go Soeda (Slovakia) Lukáš Lacko	(China) Li Zhe (France) David Guez (Netherlands) Igor Sijsling (Italy) Gianluca Naso
January 18	Vivo Tennis Cup; Rio de Janeiro, Brazil; Clay – $50,000 – 32S/32Q/16D; Singles – Doubles	(Argentina) Facundo Bagnis; 6–4, 4–6, 6–2	(Brazil) Guilherme Clezar	(Spain) Rubén Ramírez Hidalgo (Brazil) Thiago Monteiro	(Germany) Peter Torebko (Slovakia) Andrej Martin (Portugal) Gastão Elias (Argentina) Facundo Argüello
January 18	Vivo Tennis Cup; Rio de Janeiro, Brazil; Clay – $50,000 – 32S/32Q/16D; Singles – Doubles	(Portugal) Gastão Elias (Brazil) André Ghem; 6–4, 7–6^{(7–2)}	(France) Jonathan Eysseric (Mexico) Miguel Ángel Reyes-Varela	(Spain) Rubén Ramírez Hidalgo (Brazil) Thiago Monteiro	(Germany) Peter Torebko (Slovakia) Andrej Martin (Portugal) Gastão Elias (Argentina) Facundo Argüello
January 25	Claro Open Bucaramanga; Bucaramanga, Colombia; Clay – $50,000+H – 32S/32Q/16D; Singles – Doubles	(Austria) Gerald Melzer; 6–3, 6–1	(Italy) Paolo Lorenzi	(France) Mathias Bourgue (Argentina) Horacio Zeballos	(Dominican Republic) Víctor Estrella Burgos (Colombia) Eduardo Struvay (Spain) Jordi Samper Montaña (Portugal) Gastão Elias
January 25	Claro Open Bucaramanga; Bucaramanga, Colombia; Clay – $50,000+H – 32S/32Q/16D; Singles – Doubles	(Chile) Julio Peralta (Argentina) Horacio Zeballos; 6–2, 6–2	(Peru) Sergio Galdós (Venezuela) Luis David Martínez	(France) Mathias Bourgue (Argentina) Horacio Zeballos	(Dominican Republic) Víctor Estrella Burgos (Colombia) Eduardo Struvay (Spain) Jordi Samper Montaña (Portugal) Gastão Elias
January 25	Tennis Championships of Maui; Lahaina, United States; Hard – $50,000 – 32S/32Q/16D; Singles – Doubles	(China) Wu Di; 4–6, 6–3, 6–4	(United Kingdom) Kyle Edmund	(Australia) James Duckworth (United States) Noah Rubin	(United States) Nicolas Meister (United States) Frances Tiafoe (United States) Ernesto Escobedo (Australia) Alex Bolt
January 25	Tennis Championships of Maui; Lahaina, United States; Hard – $50,000 – 32S/32Q/16D; Singles – Doubles	(Chinese Taipei) Jason Jung (United States) Dennis Novikov; 6–3, 4–6, [10–8]	(Australia) Alex Bolt (Germany) Frank Moser	(Australia) James Duckworth (United States) Noah Rubin	(United States) Nicolas Meister (United States) Frances Tiafoe (United States) Ernesto Escobedo (Australia) Alex Bolt

=== February ===
Week of	Tournament	Champions	Runners-up	Semifinalists	Quarterfinalists
February 1	RBC Tennis Championships of Dallas; Dallas, United States; Hard (i) – $100,000 – 32S/32Q/16D; Singles – Doubles	(United Kingdom) Kyle Edmund; 6–3, 6–2	(United Kingdom) Daniel Evans	(Japan) Tatsuma Ito (United States) Tim Smyczek	(United States) Frances Tiafoe (Germany) Benjamin Becker (Australia) Marinko Matosevic (Slovenia) Grega Žemlja
February 1	RBC Tennis Championships of Dallas; Dallas, United States; Hard (i) – $100,000 – 32S/32Q/16D; Singles – Doubles	(United States) Nicolas Meister (United States) Eric Quigley; 6–1, 6–1	(United States) Sekou Bangoura (South Africa) Dean O'Brien	(Japan) Tatsuma Ito (United States) Tim Smyczek	(United States) Frances Tiafoe (Germany) Benjamin Becker (Australia) Marinko Matosevic (Slovenia) Grega Žemlja
February 1	Launceston International; Launceston, Australia; Hard – $75,000 – 32S/32Q/16D; Singles – Doubles	(Australia) Blake Mott; 6–7^{(4–7)}, 6–1, 6–2	(Kazakhstan) Andrey Golubev	(India) Saketh Myneni (Australia) Luke Saville	(France) Stéphane Robert (Australia) Benjamin Mitchell (Australia) Alex Bolt (Australia) Matthew Barton
February 1	Launceston International; Launceston, Australia; Hard – $75,000 – 32S/32Q/16D; Singles – Doubles	(Australia) Luke Saville (Australia) Jordan Thompson; 6–1, 4–6, [13–11]	(Australia) Dayne Kelly (Australia) Matt Reid	(India) Saketh Myneni (Australia) Luke Saville	(France) Stéphane Robert (Australia) Benjamin Mitchell (Australia) Alex Bolt (Australia) Matthew Barton
February 8	Milex Open; Santo Domingo, Dominican Republic; Clay – $75,000+H (green) – 32S/32Q/16D; Singles – Doubles	(Argentina) Guido Andreozzi; 6–0, 6–4	(Argentina) Nicolás Kicker	(Slovakia) Jozef Kovalík (France) Mathias Bourgue	(Slovakia) Andrej Martin (France) Maxime Chazal (Spain) Roberto Carballés Baena (Italy) Alessandro Giannessi
February 8	Milex Open; Santo Domingo, Dominican Republic; Clay – $75,000+H (green) – 32S/32Q/16D; Singles – Doubles	(Uruguay) Ariel Behar (Ecuador) Giovanni Lapentti; 7–5, 6–4	(France) Jonathan Eysseric (Croatia) Franko Škugor	(Slovakia) Jozef Kovalík (France) Mathias Bourgue	(Slovakia) Andrej Martin (France) Maxime Chazal (Spain) Roberto Carballés Baena (Italy) Alessandro Giannessi
February 8	Trofeo Faip–Perrel; Bergamo, Italy; Hard (i) – €42,500+H – 32S/32Q/16D; Singles – Doubles	(France) Pierre-Hugues Herbert; 6–3, 7–6^{(7–5)}	(Belarus) Egor Gerasimov	(France) Grégoire Barrère (Japan) Hiroki Moriya	(Germany) Peter Gojowczyk (Germany) Michael Berrer (Bosnia and Herzegovina) Aldin Šetkić (Switzerland) Marco Chiudinelli
February 8	Trofeo Faip–Perrel; Bergamo, Italy; Hard (i) – €42,500+H – 32S/32Q/16D; Singles – Doubles	(United Kingdom) Ken Skupski (United Kingdom) Neal Skupski; 6–3, 7–5	(Croatia) Nikola Mektić (Croatia) Antonio Šančić	(France) Grégoire Barrère (Japan) Hiroki Moriya	(Germany) Peter Gojowczyk (Germany) Michael Berrer (Bosnia and Herzegovina) Aldin Šetkić (Switzerland) Marco Chiudinelli
February 15	Wrocław Open; Wrocław, Poland; Hard (i) – €85,000+H – 32S/32Q/16D; Singles – Doubles	(Switzerland) Marco Chiudinelli; 6–3, 7–6^{(11–9)}	(Czech Republic) Jan Hernych	(Russia) Konstantin Kravchuk (Germany) Dustin Brown	(Russia) Evgeny Donskoy (Russia) Alexander Kudryavtsev (Estonia) Jürgen Zopp (France) Albano Olivetti
February 15	Wrocław Open; Wrocław, Poland; Hard (i) – €85,000+H – 32S/32Q/16D; Singles – Doubles	(France) Pierre-Hugues Herbert (France) Albano Olivetti; 6–3, 7–6^{(7–4)}	(Croatia) Nikola Mektić (Croatia) Antonio Šančić	(Russia) Konstantin Kravchuk (Germany) Dustin Brown	(Russia) Evgeny Donskoy (Russia) Alexander Kudryavtsev (Estonia) Jürgen Zopp (France) Albano Olivetti
February 15	Morelos Open; Cuernavaca, Mexico; Hard – $50,000+H – 32S/32Q/16D; Singles – Doubles	(Austria) Gerald Melzer; 7–6^{(7–4)}, 6–3	(Colombia) Alejandro González	(Italy) Alessandro Giannessi (Argentina) Horacio Zeballos	(United States) Alexander Sarkissian (Spain) Adrián Menéndez Maceiras (Germany) Tobias Kamke (Colombia) Nicolás Barrientos
February 15	Morelos Open; Cuernavaca, Mexico; Hard – $50,000+H – 32S/32Q/16D; Singles – Doubles	(Canada) Philip Bester (Canada) Peter Polansky; 6–4, 3–6, [10–6]	(El Salvador) Marcelo Arévalo (Peru) Sergio Galdós	(Italy) Alessandro Giannessi (Argentina) Horacio Zeballos	(United States) Alexander Sarkissian (Spain) Adrián Menéndez Maceiras (Germany) Tobias Kamke (Colombia) Nicolás Barrientos
February 15	Delhi Open; New Delhi, India; Hard – $50,000 – 32S/32Q/16D; Singles – Doubles	(France) Stéphane Robert; 6–3, 6–0	(India) Saketh Myneni	(Italy) Flavio Cipolla (Belgium) Kimmer Coppejans	(Chinese Taipei) Jimmy Wang (Kazakhstan) Dmitry Popko (China) Zhe Li (India) Prajnesh Gunneswaran
February 15	Delhi Open; New Delhi, India; Hard – $50,000 – 32S/32Q/16D; Singles – Doubles	(India) Yuki Bhambri (India) Mahesh Bhupathi; 6–3, 4–6, [10–5]	(India) Saketh Myneni (India) Sanam Singh	(Italy) Flavio Cipolla (Belgium) Kimmer Coppejans	(Chinese Taipei) Jimmy Wang (Kazakhstan) Dmitry Popko (China) Zhe Li (India) Prajnesh Gunneswaran
February 22	Challenger La Manche; Cherbourg-en-Cotentin, France; Hard (i) – €42,500+H – 32S/32Q/16D; Singles – Doubles	(Australia) Jordan Thompson; 4–6, 6–4, 6–1	(Czech Republic) Adam Pavlásek	(France) Kenny de Schepper (France) Vincent Millot	(Denmark) Frederik Nielsen (Germany) Daniel Brands (France) Pierre-Hugues Herbert (Russia) Karen Khachanov
February 22	Challenger La Manche; Cherbourg-en-Cotentin, France; Hard (i) – €42,500+H – 32S/32Q/16D; Singles – Doubles	(United Kingdom) Ken Skupski (United Kingdom) Neal Skupski; 4–6, 6–3, [10–6]	(Japan) Yoshihito Nishioka (Bosnia and Herzegovina) Aldin Šetkić	(France) Kenny de Schepper (France) Vincent Millot	(Denmark) Frederik Nielsen (Germany) Daniel Brands (France) Pierre-Hugues Herbert (Russia) Karen Khachanov
February 22	Shimadzu All Japan Indoor Tennis Championships; Kyoto, Japan; Hard (i) – $50,000+H – 32S/32Q/16D; Singles – Doubles	(Japan) Yūichi Sugita; 5–7, 6–3, 6–4	(China) Zhang Ze	(Australia) Matthew Barton (Japan) Yuya Kibi	(South Africa) Lloyd Harris (Japan) Go Soeda (Chinese Taipei) Jimmy Wang (United States) Peter Kobelt
February 22	Shimadzu All Japan Indoor Tennis Championships; Kyoto, Japan; Hard (i) – $50,000+H – 32S/32Q/16D; Singles – Doubles	(China) Gong Maoxin (Chinese Taipei) Yi Chu-huan; 6–3, 7–6^{(9–7)}	(Japan) Go Soeda (Japan) Yasutaka Uchiyama	(Australia) Matthew Barton (Japan) Yuya Kibi	(South Africa) Lloyd Harris (Japan) Go Soeda (Chinese Taipei) Jimmy Wang (United States) Peter Kobelt
February 29	Open BNP Paribas Banque de Bretagne; Quimper, France; Hard (i) – €42,500+H – 32S/32Q/16D; Singles – Doubles	(Russia) Andrey Rublev; 6–7^{(6–8)}, 6–4, 6–4	(France) Paul-Henri Mathieu	(Croatia) Nikola Mektić (Ukraine) Sergiy Stakhovsky	(Netherlands) Igor Sijsling (Germany) Tobias Kamke (Slovakia) Lukáš Lacko (France) Romain Jouan
February 29	Open BNP Paribas Banque de Bretagne; Quimper, France; Hard (i) – €42,500+H – 32S/32Q/16D; Singles – Doubles	(France) Tristan Lamasine (France) Albano Olivetti; 6–2, 4–6, [10–7]	(Croatia) Nikola Mektić (Croatia) Antonio Šančić	(Croatia) Nikola Mektić (Ukraine) Sergiy Stakhovsky	(Netherlands) Igor Sijsling (Germany) Tobias Kamke (Slovakia) Lukáš Lacko (France) Romain Jouan

=== March ===
Week of	Tournament	Champions	Runners-up	Semifinalists	Quarterfinalists
March 7	Abierto de Puebla; Puebla, Mexico; Hard (i) – $100,000+H – 32S/32Q/16D; Singles – Doubles	(Colombia) Eduardo Struvay; 4–6, 6–4, 6–4	(Serbia) Peđa Krstin	(Germany) Benjamin Becker (Argentina) Agustín Velotti	(Brazil) João Souza (Italy) Stefano Napolitano (Australia) Marinko Matosevic (Serbia) Nikola Milojević
March 7	Abierto de Puebla; Puebla, Mexico; Hard (i) – $100,000+H – 32S/32Q/16D; Singles – Doubles	(New Zealand) Marcus Daniell (New Zealand) Artem Sitak; 3–6, 6–2, [12–10]	(Mexico) Santiago González (Croatia) Mate Pavić	(Germany) Benjamin Becker (Argentina) Agustín Velotti	(Brazil) João Souza (Italy) Stefano Napolitano (Australia) Marinko Matosevic (Serbia) Nikola Milojević
March 7	RC Hotel Open; Jönköping, Sweden; Hard (i) – €42,500+H – 32S/32Q/16D; Singles – Doubles	(Kazakhstan) Andrey Golubev; 6–7^{(9–11)}, 7–6^{(7–5)}, 7–6^{(7–4)}	(Russia) Karen Khachanov	(Germany) Jan-Lennard Struff (Netherlands) Matwé Middelkoop	(Italy) Andrea Arnaboldi (France) Tristan Lamasine (Sweden) Elias Ymer (Sweden) Patrik Rosenholm
March 7	RC Hotel Open; Jönköping, Sweden; Hard (i) – €42,500+H – 32S/32Q/16D; Singles – Doubles	(Sweden) Isak Arvidsson (Sweden) Fred Simonsson; 6–3, 3–6, [10–6]	(Sweden) Markus Eriksson (Sweden) Milos Sekulic	(Germany) Jan-Lennard Struff (Netherlands) Matwé Middelkoop	(Italy) Andrea Arnaboldi (France) Tristan Lamasine (Sweden) Elias Ymer (Sweden) Patrik Rosenholm
March 7	Challenger ATP Cachantún Cup; Santiago, Chile; Clay – $50,000+H – 32S/32Q/16D; Singles – Doubles	(Argentina) Facundo Bagnis; 6–7^{(3–7)}, 6–4, 6–3	(Brazil) Rogério Dutra Silva	(Chile) Gonzalo Lama (Brazil) Thiago Monteiro	(Argentina) Maximiliano Estévez (Spain) Rubén Ramírez Hidalgo (Brazil) Guilherme Clezar (Argentina) Juan Ignacio Londero
March 7	Challenger ATP Cachantún Cup; Santiago, Chile; Clay – $50,000+H – 32S/32Q/16D; Singles – Doubles	(Chile) Julio Peralta (Chile) Hans Podlipnik; 7–6^{(7–4)}, 4–6, [10–5]	(Argentina) Facundo Bagnis (Argentina) Máximo González	(Chile) Gonzalo Lama (Brazil) Thiago Monteiro	(Argentina) Maximiliano Estévez (Spain) Rubén Ramírez Hidalgo (Brazil) Guilherme Clezar (Argentina) Juan Ignacio Londero
March 7	Zhuhai Challenger; Zhuhai, China; Hard – $50,000+H – 32S/32Q/16D; Singles – Doubles	(Italy) Thomas Fabbiano; 5–7, 6–1, 6–3	(China) Zhang Ze	(India) Yuki Bhambri (Australia) Jordan Thompson	(India) Saketh Myneni (Croatia) Franko Škugor (Russia) Alexander Kudryavtsev (Hungary) Márton Fucsovics
March 7	Zhuhai Challenger; Zhuhai, China; Hard – $50,000+H – 32S/32Q/16D; Singles – Doubles	(China) Gong Maoxin (Chinese Taipei) Yi Chu-huan; 2–6, 6–1, [10–5]	(Chinese Taipei) Hsieh Cheng-peng (China) Wu Di	(India) Yuki Bhambri (Australia) Jordan Thompson	(India) Saketh Myneni (Croatia) Franko Škugor (Russia) Alexander Kudryavtsev (Hungary) Márton Fucsovics
March 14	Irving Tennis Classic; Irving, United States; Hard – $125,000+H – 32S/32Q/16D; Singles – Doubles	(Spain) Marcel Granollers; 6–1, 6–1	(United Kingdom) Aljaž Bedene	(United States) Jared Donaldson (Croatia) Ivan Dodig	(Russia) Andrey Rublev (United States) Frances Tiafoe (Czech Republic) Lukáš Rosol (Argentina) Diego Schwartzman
March 14	Irving Tennis Classic; Irving, United States; Hard – $125,000+H – 32S/32Q/16D; Singles – Doubles	(United States) Nicholas Monroe (Pakistan) Aisam-ul-Haq Qureshi; 6–2, 5–7, [10–4]	(Australia) Chris Guccione (Brazil) André Sá	(United States) Jared Donaldson (Croatia) Ivan Dodig	(Russia) Andrey Rublev (United States) Frances Tiafoe (Czech Republic) Lukáš Rosol (Argentina) Diego Schwartzman
March 14	Jalisco Open; Guadalajara, Mexico; Hard – $100,000 – 32S/32Q/16D; Singles – Doubles	(Tunisia) Malek Jaziri; 5–7, 6–3, 7–6^{(7–5)}	(France) Stéphane Robert	(United States) Alexander Sarkissian (Argentina) Horacio Zeballos	(Colombia) Alejandro González (United States) Dennis Novikov (Spain) Adrián Menéndez Maceiras (France) Lucas Pouille
March 14	Jalisco Open; Guadalajara, Mexico; Hard – $100,000 – 32S/32Q/16D; Singles – Doubles	(Germany) Gero Kretschmer (Germany) Alexander Satschko; 6–3, 4–6, [10–2]	(Mexico) Santiago González (Croatia) Mate Pavić	(United States) Alexander Sarkissian (Argentina) Horacio Zeballos	(Colombia) Alejandro González (United States) Dennis Novikov (Spain) Adrián Menéndez Maceiras (France) Lucas Pouille
March 14	Challenger Banque Nationale de Drummondville; Drummondville, Canada; Hard (i) – $50,000+H – 32S/32Q/16D; Singles – Doubles	(United Kingdom) Daniel Evans; 6–3, 6–4	(United Kingdom) Edward Corrie	(Netherlands) Tim van Rijthoven (Canada) Denis Shapovalov	(Canada) Frank Dancevic (Canada) Peter Polansky (Canada) Philip Bester (Argentina) Renzo Olivo
March 14	Challenger Banque Nationale de Drummondville; Drummondville, Canada; Hard (i) – $50,000+H – 32S/32Q/16D; Singles – Doubles	(United States) James Cerretani (United States) Max Schnur; 3–6, 6–3, [11–9]	(United Kingdom) Daniel Evans (United Kingdom) Lloyd Glasspool	(Netherlands) Tim van Rijthoven (Canada) Denis Shapovalov	(Canada) Frank Dancevic (Canada) Peter Polansky (Canada) Philip Bester (Argentina) Renzo Olivo
March 14	"GDD CUP" International Challenger Guangzhou; Guangzhou, China; Hard – $50,000+H – 32S/32Q/16D; Singles – Doubles	(Georgia (country)) Nikoloz Basilashvili; 6–1, 6–7^{(6–8)}, 7–5	(Slovakia) Lukáš Lacko	(China) Zhang Ze (Israel) Dudi Sela	(China) Li Zhe (Turkey) Marsel İlhan (Croatia) Franko Škugor (Japan) Go Soeda
March 14	"GDD CUP" International Challenger Guangzhou; Guangzhou, China; Hard – $50,000+H – 32S/32Q/16D; Singles – Doubles	(Russia) Alexander Kudryavtsev (Ukraine) Denys Molchanov; 6–2, 6–2	(Thailand) Sanchai Ratiwatana (Thailand) Sonchat Ratiwatana	(China) Zhang Ze (Israel) Dudi Sela	(China) Li Zhe (Turkey) Marsel İlhan (Croatia) Franko Škugor (Japan) Go Soeda
March 14	Kazan Kremlin Cup; Kazan, Russia; Hard (i) – $40,000+H – 32S/32Q/16D; Singles – Doubles	(Germany) Tobias Kamke; 6–4, 6–2	(Russia) Aslan Karatsev	(Russia) Daniil Medvedev (Russia) Konstantin Kravchuk	(Belarus) Ilya Ivashka (Russia) Karen Khachanov (France) Alexandre Sidorenko (Kazakhstan) Aleksandr Nedovyesov
March 14	Kazan Kremlin Cup; Kazan, Russia; Hard (i) – $40,000+H – 32S/32Q/16D; Singles – Doubles	(Belarus) Aliaksandr Bury (Slovakia) Igor Zelenay; 6–2, 4–6, [10–6]	(Russia) Konstantin Kravchuk (Austria) Philipp Oswald	(Russia) Daniil Medvedev (Russia) Konstantin Kravchuk	(Belarus) Ilya Ivashka (Russia) Karen Khachanov (France) Alexandre Sidorenko (Kazakhstan) Aleksandr Nedovyesov
March 21	Gemdale ATP Challenger; Shenzhen, China; Hard – $75,000+H – 32S/32Q/16D; Singles – Doubles	(Israel) Dudi Sela; 6–4, 6–3	(China) Wu Di	(Italy) Thomas Fabbiano (Czech Republic) Adam Pavlásek	(Australia) Jordan Thompson (Turkey) Marsel İlhan (India) Saketh Myneni (Germany) Peter Gojowczyk
March 21	Gemdale ATP Challenger; Shenzhen, China; Hard – $75,000+H – 32S/32Q/16D; Singles – Doubles	(Australia) Luke Saville (Australia) Jordan Thompson; 3–6, 6–4, [12–10]	(India) Saketh Myneni (India) Jeevan Nedunchezhiyan	(Italy) Thomas Fabbiano (Czech Republic) Adam Pavlásek	(Australia) Jordan Thompson (Turkey) Marsel İlhan (India) Saketh Myneni (Germany) Peter Gojowczyk
March 21	San Luis Open Challenger Tour; San Luis Potosí, Mexico; Clay – $50,000+H – 32S/32Q/16D; Singles – Doubles	(Serbia) Peđa Krstin; 6–4, 6–2	(El Salvador) Marcelo Arévalo	(Italy) Federico Gaio (Spain) Albert Montañés	(Chile) Hans Podlipnik (Brazil) André Ghem (Brazil) Caio Zampieri (Egypt) Mohamed Safwat
March 21	San Luis Open Challenger Tour; San Luis Potosí, Mexico; Clay – $50,000+H – 32S/32Q/16D; Singles – Doubles	(New Zealand) Marcus Daniell (New Zealand) Artem Sitak; 6–3, 7–6^{(7–4)}	(Mexico) Santiago González (Croatia) Mate Pavić	(Italy) Federico Gaio (Spain) Albert Montañés	(Chile) Hans Podlipnik (Brazil) André Ghem (Brazil) Caio Zampieri (Egypt) Mohamed Safwat
March 28	Israel Open; Ra'anana, Israel; Hard – $125,000 – 32S/32Q/16D; Singles – Doubles	(Russia) Evgeny Donskoy; 6–4, 6–4	(Lithuania) Ričardas Berankis	(Italy) Thomas Fabbiano (Israel) Dudi Sela	(Switzerland) Marco Chiudinelli (Chinese Taipei) Chen Ti (Russia) Konstantin Kravchuk (Israel) Amir Weintraub
March 28	Israel Open; Ra'anana, Israel; Hard – $125,000 – 32S/32Q/16D; Singles – Doubles	(Russia) Konstantin Kravchuk (Ukraine) Denys Molchanov; 4–6, 7–6^{(7–1)}, [10–4]	(Israel) Jonathan Erlich (Austria) Philipp Oswald	(Italy) Thomas Fabbiano (Israel) Dudi Sela	(Switzerland) Marco Chiudinelli (Chinese Taipei) Chen Ti (Russia) Konstantin Kravchuk (Israel) Amir Weintraub
March 28	Torneo Internacional Challenger León; León, Mexico; Hard – $75,000+H – 32S/32Q/16D; Singles – Doubles	(Germany) Michael Berrer; 6–3, 6–2	(Brazil) João Souza	(United States) Daniel Nguyen (Brazil) Caio Zampieri	(Brazil) André Ghem (Colombia) Alejandro González (Tunisia) Malek Jaziri (Spain) Adrián Menéndez Maceiras
March 28	Torneo Internacional Challenger León; León, Mexico; Hard – $75,000+H – 32S/32Q/16D; Singles – Doubles	(Mexico) Santiago González (Croatia) Mate Pavić; 6–4, 3–6, [13–11]	(Australia) Sam Groth (India) Leander Paes	(United States) Daniel Nguyen (Brazil) Caio Zampieri	(Brazil) André Ghem (Colombia) Alejandro González (Tunisia) Malek Jaziri (Spain) Adrián Menéndez Maceiras
March 28	Open Harmonie mutuelle Saint-Brieuc, France; Hard (i) – €42,500+H – 32S/32Q/16D; Singles – Doubles	(France) Alexandre Sidorenko; 2–6, 6–3, 7–6^{(7–3)}	(Netherlands) Igor Sijsling	(Kazakhstan) Aleksandr Nedovyesov (France) Gleb Sakharov	(Germany) Tobias Kamke (Italy) Federico Gaio (France) Grégoire Barrère (United Kingdom) Daniel Evans
March 28	Open Harmonie mutuelle Saint-Brieuc, France; Hard (i) – €42,500+H – 32S/32Q/16D; Singles – Doubles	(Australia) Rameez Junaid (Sweden) Andreas Siljeström; 5–7, 7–6^{(7–4)}, [10–8]	(United States) James Cerretani (Netherlands) Antal van der Duim	(Kazakhstan) Aleksandr Nedovyesov (France) Gleb Sakharov	(Germany) Tobias Kamke (Italy) Federico Gaio (France) Grégoire Barrère (United Kingdom) Daniel Evans

=== April ===
Week of	Tournament	Champions	Runners-up	Semifinalists	Quarterfinalists
April 4	Open de Guadeloupe; Le Gosier, Guadeloupe; Hard – $100,000+H – 32S/32Q/16D; Singles – Doubles	(Tunisia) Malek Jaziri; 6–2, 6–4	(United States) Stefan Kozlov	(Japan) Yoshihito Nishioka (United States) Taylor Fritz	(United States) Rajeev Ram (France) Vincent Millot (Brazil) Thiago Monteiro (Japan) Tatsuma Ito
April 4	Open de Guadeloupe; Le Gosier, Guadeloupe; Hard – $100,000+H – 32S/32Q/16D; Singles – Doubles	(United States) James Cerretani (Netherlands) Antal van der Duim; 6–2, 5–7, [10–8]	(United States) Austin Krajicek (United States) Mitchell Krueger	(Japan) Yoshihito Nishioka (United States) Taylor Fritz	(United States) Rajeev Ram (France) Vincent Millot (Brazil) Thiago Monteiro (Japan) Tatsuma Ito
April 4	Capri Watch Cup; Naples, Italy; Clay – €42,500+H – 32S/32Q/16D; Singles – Doubles	(Slovakia) Jozef Kovalík; 6–3, 6–2	(Belgium) Arthur De Greef	(Romania) Marius Copil (Portugal) Gastão Elias	(Spain) Roberto Carballés Baena (Italy) Salvatore Caruso (Belarus) Uladzimir Ignatik (Italy) Filippo Volandri
April 4	Capri Watch Cup; Naples, Italy; Clay – €42,500+H – 32S/32Q/16D; Singles – Doubles	(Germany) Gero Kretschmer (Germany) Alexander Satschko; 6–1, 6–3	(Italy) Matteo Donati (Italy) Stefano Napolitano	(Romania) Marius Copil (Portugal) Gastão Elias	(Spain) Roberto Carballés Baena (Italy) Salvatore Caruso (Belarus) Uladzimir Ignatik (Italy) Filippo Volandri
April 11	Sarasota Open; Sarasota, United States; Clay – $100,000 (green) – 32S/32Q/16D; Singles – Doubles	(Germany) Mischa Zverev; 6–4, 7–6^{(7–2)}	(Austria) Gerald Melzer	(Brazil) Guilherme Clezar (United States) Bjorn Fratangelo	(United States) Noah Rubin (France) Quentin Halys (Argentina) Tomás Lipovšek Puches (Switzerland) Henri Laaksonen
April 11	Sarasota Open; Sarasota, United States; Clay – $100,000 (green) – 32S/32Q/16D; Singles – Doubles	(Argentina) Facundo Argüello (Argentina) Nicolás Kicker; 4–6, 6–4, [10–6]	(El Salvador) Marcelo Arévalo (Peru) Sergio Galdós	(Brazil) Guilherme Clezar (United States) Bjorn Fratangelo	(United States) Noah Rubin (France) Quentin Halys (Argentina) Tomás Lipovšek Puches (Switzerland) Henri Laaksonen
April 11	Open Citta' Della Disfida; Barletta, Italy; Clay – €42,500+H – 32S/32Q/16D; Singles – Doubles	(Sweden) Elias Ymer; 7–5, 6–4	(Czech Republic) Adam Pavlásek	(Estonia) Jürgen Zopp (Spain) Enrique López Pérez	(Brazil) Rogério Dutra Silva (Portugal) Gastão Elias (Italy) Lorenzo Sonego (Italy) Alessandro Giannessi
April 11	Open Citta' Della Disfida; Barletta, Italy; Clay – €42,500+H – 32S/32Q/16D; Singles – Doubles	(Sweden) Johan Brunström (Sweden) Andreas Siljeström; 0–6, 6–4, [10–8]	(Italy) Flavio Cipolla (Brazil) Rogério Dutra Silva	(Estonia) Jürgen Zopp (Spain) Enrique López Pérez	(Brazil) Rogério Dutra Silva (Portugal) Gastão Elias (Italy) Lorenzo Sonego (Italy) Alessandro Giannessi
April 11	Gwangju Open; Gwangju, South Korea; Hard – $50,000+H – 32S/32Q/16D; Singles – Doubles	(Lithuania) Ričardas Berankis; 6–3, 6–2	(Slovenia) Grega Žemlja	(China) Wu Di (Japan) Tatsuma Ito	(South Korea) Chung Hong (South Korea) Lee Duck-hee (Australia) Matt Reid (Germany) Jeremy Jahn
April 11	Gwangju Open; Gwangju, South Korea; Hard – $50,000+H – 32S/32Q/16D; Singles – Doubles	(Thailand) Sanchai Ratiwatana (Thailand) Sonchat Ratiwatana; 6–3, 6–2	(Denmark) Frederik Nielsen (Republic of Ireland) David O'Hare	(China) Wu Di (Japan) Tatsuma Ito	(South Korea) Chung Hong (South Korea) Lee Duck-hee (Australia) Matt Reid (Germany) Jeremy Jahn
April 18	TAC Cup Nanjing Challenger; Nanjing, China; Clay – $50,000+H – 32S/32Q/16D; Singles – Doubles	(Lithuania) Ričardas Berankis; 6–3, 6–4	(Slovenia) Grega Žemlja	(Australia) Jordan Thompson (Kazakhstan) Aleksandr Nedovyesov	(Colombia) Nicolás Barrientos (Chinese Taipei) Jason Jung (United States) Daniel Nguyen (Spain) Rubén Ramírez Hidalgo
April 18	TAC Cup Nanjing Challenger; Nanjing, China; Clay – $50,000+H – 32S/32Q/16D; Singles – Doubles	(India) Saketh Myneni (India) Jeevan Nedunchezhiyan; 6–3, 6–3	(Ukraine) Denys Molchanov (Kazakhstan) Aleksandr Nedovyesov	(Australia) Jordan Thompson (Kazakhstan) Aleksandr Nedovyesov	(Colombia) Nicolás Barrientos (Chinese Taipei) Jason Jung (United States) Daniel Nguyen (Spain) Rubén Ramírez Hidalgo
April 18	São Paulo Challenger de Tênis; São Paulo, Brazil; Clay – $50,000+H – 32S/32Q/16D; Singles – Doubles	(Chile) Gonzalo Lama; 6–2, 6–2	(United States) Ernesto Escobedo	(Brazil) Thiago Monteiro (Sweden) Christian Lindell	(Argentina) Juan Ignacio Londero (Italy) Marco Bortolotti (Brazil) José Pereira (El Salvador) Marcelo Arévalo
April 18	São Paulo Challenger de Tênis; São Paulo, Brazil; Clay – $50,000+H – 32S/32Q/16D; Singles – Doubles	(Brazil) Fabrício Neis (Brazil) Caio Zampieri; 6–4, 7–6^{(7–3)}	(Brazil) José Pereira (Brazil) Alexandre Tsuchiya	(Brazil) Thiago Monteiro (Sweden) Christian Lindell	(Argentina) Juan Ignacio Londero (Italy) Marco Bortolotti (Brazil) José Pereira (El Salvador) Marcelo Arévalo
April 18	ATP Challenger Torino; Turin, Italy; Clay – €42,500+H – 32S/32Q/16D; Singles – Doubles	(Portugal) Gastão Elias; 3–6, 6–4, 6–2	(Spain) Enrique López Pérez	(Italy) Filippo Volandri (Serbia) Laslo Đere	(Slovenia) Blaž Rola (Belgium) Kimmer Coppejans (Chile) Hans Podlipnik (Italy) Edoardo Eremin
April 18	ATP Challenger Torino; Turin, Italy; Clay – €42,500+H – 32S/32Q/16D; Singles – Doubles	(Slovakia) Andrej Martin (Chile) Hans Podlipnik; 4–6, 7–6^{(7–3)}, [12–10]	(Australia) Rameez Junaid (Poland) Mateusz Kowalczyk	(Italy) Filippo Volandri (Serbia) Laslo Đere	(Slovenia) Blaž Rola (Belgium) Kimmer Coppejans (Chile) Hans Podlipnik (Italy) Edoardo Eremin
April 18	St. Joseph's/Candler Savannah Challenger; Savannah, United States; Clay – $50,000 (green) – 32S/32Q/16D; Singles – Doubles	(United States) Bjorn Fratangelo; 6–1, 6–3	(United States) Jared Donaldson	(United States) Denis Kudla (United States) Donald Young	(Chile) Nicolás Jarry (United States) Frances Tiafoe (Austria) Gerald Melzer (Argentina) Nicolás Kicker
April 18	St. Joseph's/Candler Savannah Challenger; Savannah, United States; Clay – $50,000 (green) – 32S/32Q/16D; Singles – Doubles	(United States) Brian Baker (United States) Ryan Harrison; 5–7, 7–6^{(7–4)}, [10–8]	(India) Purav Raja (India) Divij Sharan	(United States) Denis Kudla (United States) Donald Young	(Chile) Nicolás Jarry (United States) Frances Tiafoe (Austria) Gerald Melzer (Argentina) Nicolás Kicker
April 25	Kunming Open; Anning, China; Clay – $100,000 – 32S/32Q/16D; Singles – Doubles	(Australia) Jordan Thompson; 6–3, 6–2	(France) Mathias Bourgue	(India) Saketh Myneni (Kazakhstan) Aleksandr Nedovyesov	(Australia) Andrew Whittington (Belgium) Arthur De Greef (Austria) Bastian Trinker (Spain) Rubén Ramírez Hidalgo
April 25	Kunming Open; Anning, China; Clay – $100,000 – 32S/32Q/16D; Singles – Doubles	(China) Bai Yan (Italy) Riccardo Ghedin; 4–6, 6–3, [10–6]	(Ukraine) Denys Molchanov (Kazakhstan) Aleksandr Nedovyesov	(India) Saketh Myneni (Kazakhstan) Aleksandr Nedovyesov	(Australia) Andrew Whittington (Belgium) Arthur De Greef (Austria) Bastian Trinker (Spain) Rubén Ramírez Hidalgo
April 25	Santaizi ATP Challenger; Taipei City, Taiwan; Carpet (i) – $75,000+H – 32S/32Q/16D; Singles – Doubles	(United Kingdom) Daniel Evans; 3–6, 6–4, 6–4	(Russia) Konstantin Kravchuk	(Lithuania) Ričardas Berankis (United Kingdom) Liam Broady	(Ukraine) Sergiy Stakhovsky (Australia) Marinko Matosevic (Japan) Tatsuma Ito (Israel) Amir Weintraub
April 25	Santaizi ATP Challenger; Taipei City, Taiwan; Carpet (i) – $75,000+H – 32S/32Q/16D; Singles – Doubles	(Chinese Taipei) Hsieh Cheng-peng (Chinese Taipei) Yang Tsung-hua; 7–6^{(8–6)}, 6–4	(Denmark) Frederik Nielsen (Republic of Ireland) David O'Hare	(Lithuania) Ričardas Berankis (United Kingdom) Liam Broady	(Ukraine) Sergiy Stakhovsky (Australia) Marinko Matosevic (Japan) Tatsuma Ito (Israel) Amir Weintraub
April 25	Prosperita Open; Ostrava, Czech Republic; Clay – €42,500 – 32S/32Q/16D; Singles – Doubles	(France) Constant Lestienne; 6–7^{(5–7)}, 6–1, 6–2	(Czech Republic) Zdeněk Kolář	(Czech Republic) Marek Michalička (Italy) Stefano Napolitano	(Spain) Jordi Samper Montaña (Serbia) Laslo Đere (Estonia) Jürgen Zopp (France) Grégoire Barrère
April 25	Prosperita Open; Ostrava, Czech Republic; Clay – €42,500 – 32S/32Q/16D; Singles – Doubles	(Netherlands) Sander Arends (Austria) Tristan-Samuel Weissborn; 7–6^{(10–8)}, 6–7^{(4–7)}, [10–5]	(Czech Republic) Lukáš Dlouhý (Chile) Hans Podlipnik	(Czech Republic) Marek Michalička (Italy) Stefano Napolitano	(Spain) Jordi Samper Montaña (Serbia) Laslo Đere (Estonia) Jürgen Zopp (France) Grégoire Barrère
April 25	Tallahassee Tennis Challenger; Tallahassee, United States; Clay – $50,000 (green) – 32S/32Q/16D; Singles – Doubles	(France) Quentin Halys; 6–7^{(6–8)}, 6–4, 6–2	(United States) Frances Tiafoe	(United States) Ryan Harrison (Republic of Ireland) James McGee	(United States) Donald Young (United States) Noah Rubin (United Kingdom) James Ward (United States) Stefan Kozlov
April 25	Tallahassee Tennis Challenger; Tallahassee, United States; Clay – $50,000 (green) – 32S/32Q/16D; Singles – Doubles	(United States) Dennis Novikov (Chile) Julio Peralta; 3–6, 6–4, [12–10]	(Australia) Peter Luczak (Australia) Marc Polmans	(United States) Ryan Harrison (Republic of Ireland) James McGee	(United States) Donald Young (United States) Noah Rubin (United Kingdom) James Ward (United States) Stefan Kozlov

=== May ===
Week of	Tournament	Champions	Runners-up	Semifinalists	Quarterfinalists
May 2	Open du Pays d'Aix; Aix-en-Provence, France; Clay – €85,000+H – 32S/32Q/16D; Singles – Doubles	(Brazil) Thiago Monteiro; 4–6, 6–4, 6–1	(Argentina) Carlos Berlocq	(Sweden) Elias Ymer (Argentina) Renzo Olivo	(Czech Republic) Lukáš Rosol (Brazil) Rogério Dutra Silva (France) Tristan Lamasine (Czech Republic) Marek Michalička
May 2	Open du Pays d'Aix; Aix-en-Provence, France; Clay – €85,000+H – 32S/32Q/16D; Singles – Doubles	(Austria) Oliver Marach (Austria) Philipp Oswald; 6–1, 4–6, [10–7]	(Argentina) Guillermo Durán (Argentina) Máximo González	(Sweden) Elias Ymer (Argentina) Renzo Olivo	(Czech Republic) Lukáš Rosol (Brazil) Rogério Dutra Silva (France) Tristan Lamasine (Czech Republic) Marek Michalička
May 2	Busan Open; Busan, South Korea; Hard – $100,000+H – 32S/32Q/16D; Singles – Doubles	(Russia) Konstantin Kravchuk; 6–4, 6–4	(United Kingdom) Daniel Evans	(Slovenia) Grega Žemlja (Australia) John Millman	(Switzerland) Marco Chiudinelli (Australia) Marinko Matosevic (Japan) Yūichi Sugita (United Kingdom) Liam Broady
May 2	Busan Open; Busan, South Korea; Hard – $100,000+H – 32S/32Q/16D; Singles – Doubles	(Australia) Sam Groth (India) Leander Paes; 4–6, 6–1, [10–7]	(Thailand) Sanchai Ratiwatana (Thailand) Sonchat Ratiwatana	(Slovenia) Grega Žemlja (Australia) John Millman	(Switzerland) Marco Chiudinelli (Australia) Marinko Matosevic (Japan) Yūichi Sugita (United Kingdom) Liam Broady
May 2	Karshi Challenger; Qarshi, Uzbekistan; Hard – $50,000+H – 32S/32Q/16D; Singles – Doubles	(Serbia) Marko Tepavac; 2–6, 6–3, 7–6^{(7–4)}	(Israel) Dudi Sela	(Moldova) Radu Albot (Belarus) Ilya Ivashka	(Kazakhstan) Dmitry Popko (Belarus) Maxim Dubarenco (Canada) Steven Diez (Russia) Karen Khachanov
May 2	Karshi Challenger; Qarshi, Uzbekistan; Hard – $50,000+H – 32S/32Q/16D; Singles – Doubles	(Spain) Enrique López Pérez (India) Jeevan Nedunchezhiyan; 6–1, 6–4	(Georgia (country)) Aleksandre Metreveli (Kazakhstan) Dmitry Popko	(Moldova) Radu Albot (Belarus) Ilya Ivashka	(Kazakhstan) Dmitry Popko (Belarus) Maxim Dubarenco (Canada) Steven Diez (Russia) Karen Khachanov
May 2	Garden Open; Rome, Italy; Clay – €42,500+H – 32S/32Q/16D; Singles – Doubles	(United Kingdom) Kyle Edmund; 7–6^{(7–2)}, 6–0	(Serbia) Filip Krajinović	(Czech Republic) Jiří Veselý (Italy) Filippo Volandri	(Germany) Tobias Kamke (Italy) Andrea Pellegrino (Argentina) Marco Trungelliti (Slovenia) Blaž Rola
May 2	Garden Open; Rome, Italy; Clay – €42,500+H – 32S/32Q/16D; Singles – Doubles	(China) Bai Yan (China) Li Zhe; 6–3, 3–6, [11–9]	(Netherlands) Sander Arends (Austria) Tristan-Samuel Weissborn	(Czech Republic) Jiří Veselý (Italy) Filippo Volandri	(Germany) Tobias Kamke (Italy) Andrea Pellegrino (Argentina) Marco Trungelliti (Slovenia) Blaž Rola
May 9	BNP Paribas Primrose Bordeaux; Bordeaux, France; Clay – €85,000+H – 32S/32Q/16D; Singles – Doubles	(Brazil) Rogério Dutra Silva; 6–3, 6–1	(United States) Bjorn Fratangelo	(Argentina) Máximo González (Sweden) Elias Ymer	(Belgium) Steve Darcis (Brazil) André Ghem (Russia) Daniil Medvedev (France) Jonathan Eysseric
May 9	BNP Paribas Primrose Bordeaux; Bordeaux, France; Clay – €85,000+H – 32S/32Q/16D; Singles – Doubles	(Sweden) Johan Brunström (Sweden) Andreas Siljeström; 6–1, 3–6, [10–4]	(Argentina) Guillermo Durán (Argentina) Máximo González	(Argentina) Máximo González (Sweden) Elias Ymer	(Belgium) Steve Darcis (Brazil) André Ghem (Russia) Daniil Medvedev (France) Jonathan Eysseric
May 9	Lecoq Seoul Open; Seoul, South Korea; Hard – $100,000+H – 32S/32Q/16D; Singles – Doubles	(Ukraine) Sergiy Stakhovsky; 4–6, 6–3, 7–6^{(9–7)}	(Chinese Taipei) Lu Yen-hsun	(Slovakia) Lukáš Lacko (Russia) Alexander Kudryavtsev	(Australia) John Millman (Chinese Taipei) Jason Jung (Australia) Sam Groth (South Korea) Lee Duck-hee
May 9	Lecoq Seoul Open; Seoul, South Korea; Hard – $100,000+H – 32S/32Q/16D; Singles – Doubles	(Australia) Matt Reid (Australia) John-Patrick Smith; 6–3, 7–5	(China) Gong Maoxin (Chinese Taipei) Yi Chu-huan	(Slovakia) Lukáš Lacko (Russia) Alexander Kudryavtsev	(Australia) John Millman (Chinese Taipei) Jason Jung (Australia) Sam Groth (South Korea) Lee Duck-hee
May 9	Heilbronner Neckarcup; Heilbronn, Germany; Clay – €64,000+H – 32S/32Q/16D; Singles – Doubles	(Georgia (country)) Nikoloz Basilashvili; 6–4, 7–6^{(7–3)}	(Germany) Jan-Lennard Struff	(Slovakia) Jozef Kovalík (Spain) Albert Montañés	(Argentina) Carlos Berlocq (Netherlands) Igor Sijsling (Belgium) Yannik Reuter (Germany) Florian Mayer
May 9	Heilbronner Neckarcup; Heilbronn, Germany; Clay – €64,000+H – 32S/32Q/16D; Singles – Doubles	(Netherlands) Sander Arends (Austria) Tristan-Samuel Weissborn; 6–3, 6–4	(Croatia) Nikola Mektić (Croatia) Antonio Šančić	(Slovakia) Jozef Kovalík (Spain) Albert Montañés	(Argentina) Carlos Berlocq (Netherlands) Igor Sijsling (Belgium) Yannik Reuter (Germany) Florian Mayer
May 9	Samarkand Challenger; Samarkand, Uzbekistan; Clay – $50,000+H – 32S/32Q/16D; Singles – Doubles	(Russia) Karen Khachanov; 6–1, 6–7^{(6–8)}, 6–1	(Spain) Rubén Ramírez Hidalgo	(Argentina) Agustín Velotti (India) Ramkumar Ramanathan	(Belarus) Ilya Ivashka (Portugal) Frederico Ferreira Silva (Israel) Amir Weintraub (Moldova) Radu Albot
May 9	Samarkand Challenger; Samarkand, Uzbekistan; Clay – $50,000+H – 32S/32Q/16D; Singles – Doubles	(Russia) Denis Matsukevich (Belarus) Andrei Vasilevski; 6–4, 5–7, [10–5]	(Chinese Taipei) Hsieh Cheng-peng (Chinese Taipei) Yang Tsung-hua	(Argentina) Agustín Velotti (India) Ramkumar Ramanathan	(Belarus) Ilya Ivashka (Portugal) Frederico Ferreira Silva (Israel) Amir Weintraub (Moldova) Radu Albot
May 16	KPN Renewables Bangkok Open; Bangkok, Thailand; Hard – $50,000+H – 32S/32Q/16D; Singles – Doubles	(Australia) James Duckworth; 7–6^{(7–5)}, 6–4	(Republic of Ireland) Sam Barry	(United Kingdom) Alexander Ward (United States) Alexander Sarkissian	(United States) Mitchell Krueger (China) Zhang Ze (United Kingdom) Lloyd Glasspool (Chinese Taipei) Lu Yen-hsun
May 16	KPN Renewables Bangkok Open; Bangkok, Thailand; Hard – $50,000+H – 32S/32Q/16D; Singles – Doubles	(Chinese Taipei) Chen Ti (Chinese Taipei) Jason Jung; 6–4, 3–6, [10–8]	(South Africa) Dean O'Brien (South Africa) Ruan Roelofse	(United Kingdom) Alexander Ward (United States) Alexander Sarkissian	(United States) Mitchell Krueger (China) Zhang Ze (United Kingdom) Lloyd Glasspool (Chinese Taipei) Lu Yen-hsun
May 16	Venice Challenge Save Cup; Mestre, Italy; Clay – €42,500 – 32S/32Q/16D; Singles – Doubles	(Portugal) Gastão Elias; 7–6^{(7–0)}, 6–2	(Argentina) Horacio Zeballos	(Italy) Paolo Lorenzi (Belgium) Joris De Loore	(Austria) Dennis Novak (Italy) Matteo Viola (Italy) Gianluca Mager (Serbia) Dušan Lajović
May 16	Venice Challenge Save Cup; Mestre, Italy; Clay – €42,500 – 32S/32Q/16D; Singles – Doubles	(Brazil) Fabrício Neis (Brazil) Caio Zampieri; 7–6^{(7–3)}, 4–6, [12–10]	(Germany) Kevin Krawietz (Croatia) Dino Marcan	(Italy) Paolo Lorenzi (Belgium) Joris De Loore	(Austria) Dennis Novak (Italy) Matteo Viola (Italy) Gianluca Mager (Serbia) Dušan Lajović
May 23	Internazionali di Tennis Citta' di Vicenza; Vicenza, Italy; Clay – €42,500 – 32S/32Q/16D; Singles – Doubles	(Argentina) Guido Andreozzi; 6–0, ret.	(Spain) Pere Riba	(Portugal) Gastão Elias (Italy) Edoardo Eremin	(Argentina) Nicolás Kicker (Spain) Daniel Gimeno Traver (United States) Stefan Kozlov (Kazakhstan) Andrey Golubev
May 23	Internazionali di Tennis Citta' di Vicenza; Vicenza, Italy; Clay – €42,500 – 32S/32Q/16D; Singles – Doubles	(Kazakhstan) Andrey Golubev (Croatia) Nikola Mektić; 6–3, 6–3	(Portugal) Gastão Elias (Brazil) Fabrício Neis	(Portugal) Gastão Elias (Italy) Edoardo Eremin	(Argentina) Nicolás Kicker (Spain) Daniel Gimeno Traver (United States) Stefan Kozlov (Kazakhstan) Andrey Golubev
May 30	UniCredit Czech Open; Prostějov, Czech Republic; Clay – €106,500+H – 32S/32Q/16D; Singles – Doubles	(Kazakhstan) Mikhail Kukushkin; 6–1, 6–2	(Hungary) Márton Fucsovics	(Spain) Íñigo Cervantes (Russia) Karen Khachanov	(Lithuania) Ričardas Berankis (Czech Republic) Adam Pavlásek (Czech Republic) Jiří Veselý (Czech Republic) Lukáš Rosol
May 30	UniCredit Czech Open; Prostějov, Czech Republic; Clay – €106,500+H – 32S/32Q/16D; Singles – Doubles	(Belarus) Aliaksandr Bury (Slovakia) Igor Zelenay; 6–4, 6–4	(Chile) Julio Peralta (Chile) Hans Podlipnik	(Spain) Íñigo Cervantes (Russia) Karen Khachanov	(Lithuania) Ričardas Berankis (Czech Republic) Adam Pavlásek (Czech Republic) Jiří Veselý (Czech Republic) Lukáš Rosol
May 30	Franken Challenge; Fürth, Germany; Clay – €42,500+H – 32S/32Q/16D; Singles – Doubles	(Moldova) Radu Albot; 6–3, 6–4	(Germany) Jan-Lennard Struff	(Argentina) Máximo González (Germany) Tobias Kamke	(Austria) Gerald Melzer (Slovakia) Jozef Kovalík (Spain) Albert Montañés (Brazil) Thiago Monteiro
May 30	Franken Challenge; Fürth, Germany; Clay – €42,500+H – 32S/32Q/16D; Singles – Doubles	(Argentina) Facundo Argüello (Venezuela) Roberto Maytín; 6–3, 6–4	(Slovakia) Andrej Martin (Austria) Tristan-Samuel Weissborn	(Argentina) Máximo González (Germany) Tobias Kamke	(Austria) Gerald Melzer (Slovakia) Jozef Kovalík (Spain) Albert Montañés (Brazil) Thiago Monteiro
May 30	Aegon Manchester Trophy; Manchester, Great Britain; Grass – €42,500 – 32S/32Q/16D; Singles – Doubles	(Germany) Dustin Brown; 7–6^{(7–5)}, 6–1	(Chinese Taipei) Lu Yen-hsun	(United States) Denis Kudla (Germany) Peter Gojowczyk	(Australia) Sam Groth (Ukraine) Sergiy Stakhovsky (United Kingdom) Alexander Ward (United Kingdom) James Ward
May 30	Aegon Manchester Trophy; Manchester, Great Britain; Grass – €42,500 – 32S/32Q/16D; Singles – Doubles	(India) Purav Raja (India) Divij Sharan; 6–3, 3–6, [11–9]	(United Kingdom) Ken Skupski (United Kingdom) Neal Skupski	(United States) Denis Kudla (Germany) Peter Gojowczyk	(Australia) Sam Groth (Ukraine) Sergiy Stakhovsky (United Kingdom) Alexander Ward (United Kingdom) James Ward

=== June ===
Week of	Tournament	Champions	Runners-up	Semifinalists	Quarterfinalists
June 6	Città di Caltanissetta; Caltanissetta, Italy; Clay – €106,500+H – 32S/32Q/16D; Singles – Doubles	(Italy) Paolo Lorenzi; 6–3, 4–6, 7–6^{(9–7)}	(Italy) Matteo Donati	(Italy) Alessandro Giannessi (Argentina) Guido Andreozzi	(Chile) Gonzalo Lama (El Salvador) Marcelo Arévalo (Spain) Enrique López Pérez (Italy) Gianluigi Quinzi
June 6	Città di Caltanissetta; Caltanissetta, Italy; Clay – €106,500+H – 32S/32Q/16D; Singles – Doubles	(Argentina) Guido Andreozzi (Argentina) Andrés Molteni; 6–1, 6–2	(El Salvador) Marcelo Arévalo (Mexico) Miguel Ángel Reyes-Varela	(Italy) Alessandro Giannessi (Argentina) Guido Andreozzi	(Chile) Gonzalo Lama (El Salvador) Marcelo Arévalo (Spain) Enrique López Pérez (Italy) Gianluigi Quinzi
June 6	Open Sopra Steria de Lyon; Lyon, France; Clay – €64,000+H – 32S/32Q/16D; Singles – Doubles	(Belgium) Steve Darcis; 3–6, 6–2, 6–0	(Brazil) Thiago Monteiro	(Brazil) João Souza (France) Grégoire Barrère	(Belgium) Kimmer Coppejans (Argentina) Carlos Berlocq (United States) Tommy Paul (Switzerland) Henri Laaksonen
June 6	Open Sopra Steria de Lyon; Lyon, France; Clay – €64,000+H – 32S/32Q/16D; Singles – Doubles	(France) Grégoire Barrère (France) Tristan Lamasine; 2–6, 6–3, [10–6]	(France) Jonathan Eysseric (Croatia) Franko Škugor	(Brazil) João Souza (France) Grégoire Barrère	(Belgium) Kimmer Coppejans (Argentina) Carlos Berlocq (United States) Tommy Paul (Switzerland) Henri Laaksonen
June 6	Hoff Open; Moscow, Russia; Clay – $75,000+H – 32S/32Q/16D; Singles – Doubles	(Kazakhstan) Mikhail Kukushkin; 6–3, 6–3	(Canada) Steven Diez	(Ecuador) Emilio Gómez (Russia) Karen Khachanov	(Kazakhstan) Aleksandr Nedovyesov (Russia) Alexander Bublik (Kazakhstan) Dmitry Popko (Serbia) Miki Janković
June 6	Hoff Open; Moscow, Russia; Clay – $75,000+H – 32S/32Q/16D; Singles – Doubles	(Argentina) Facundo Argüello (Venezuela) Roberto Maytín; 6–2, 7–5	(Georgia (country)) Aleksandre Metreveli (Kazakhstan) Dmitry Popko	(Ecuador) Emilio Gómez (Russia) Karen Khachanov	(Kazakhstan) Aleksandr Nedovyesov (Russia) Alexander Bublik (Kazakhstan) Dmitry Popko (Serbia) Miki Janković
June 6	Sparta Prague Open; Prague, Czech Republic; Clay – €42,500+H – 32S/32Q/16D; Singles – Doubles	(Czech Republic) Adam Pavlásek; 6–4, 3–6, 6–3	(France) Stéphane Robert	(Slovakia) Jozef Kovalík (Austria) Dennis Novak	(Czech Republic) Lukáš Rosol (Germany) Cedrik-Marcel Stebe (Estonia) Jürgen Zopp (Brazil) Rogério Dutra Silva
June 6	Sparta Prague Open; Prague, Czech Republic; Clay – €42,500+H – 32S/32Q/16D; Singles – Doubles	(Poland) Tomasz Bednarek (Croatia) Nikola Mektić; 6–4, 5–7, [10–7]	(Czech Republic) Zdeněk Kolář (Czech Republic) Matěj Vocel	(Slovakia) Jozef Kovalík (Austria) Dennis Novak	(Czech Republic) Lukáš Rosol (Germany) Cedrik-Marcel Stebe (Estonia) Jürgen Zopp (Brazil) Rogério Dutra Silva
June 6	Aegon Surbiton Trophy; Surbiton, United Kingdom; Grass – €42,500 – 32S/32Q/16D; Singles – Doubles	(Chinese Taipei) Lu Yen-hsun; 7–5, 7–6^{(13–11)}	(Romania) Marius Copil	(United States) Bjorn Fratangelo (Australia) Jordan Thompson	(Germany) Tobias Kamke (United States) Frances Tiafoe (Australia) Luke Saville (Germany) Dustin Brown
June 6	Aegon Surbiton Trophy; Surbiton, United Kingdom; Grass – €42,500 – 32S/32Q/16D; Singles – Doubles	(India) Purav Raja (India) Divij Sharan; 6–4, 7–6^{(7–3)}	(United Kingdom) Ken Skupski (United Kingdom) Neal Skupski	(United States) Bjorn Fratangelo (Australia) Jordan Thompson	(Germany) Tobias Kamke (United States) Frances Tiafoe (Australia) Luke Saville (Germany) Dustin Brown
June 13	Blu Panorama Airlines Tennis Cup; Perugia, Italy; Clay – €42,500+H – 32S/32Q/16D; Singles – Doubles	(Argentina) Nicolás Kicker; 2–6, 6–3, 6–0	(Slovenia) Blaž Rola	(Argentina) Juan Ignacio Londero (Sweden) Elias Ymer	(Brazil) Rogério Dutra Silva (Argentina) Guido Andreozzi (Italy) Marco Cecchinato (Spain) Roberto Carballés Baena
June 13	Blu Panorama Airlines Tennis Cup; Perugia, Italy; Clay – €42,500+H – 32S/32Q/16D; Singles – Doubles	(Brazil) Rogério Dutra Silva (Argentina) Andrés Molteni; 7–5, 6–3	(Colombia) Nicolás Barrientos (Brazil) Fabrício Neis	(Argentina) Juan Ignacio Londero (Sweden) Elias Ymer	(Brazil) Rogério Dutra Silva (Argentina) Guido Andreozzi (Italy) Marco Cecchinato (Spain) Roberto Carballés Baena
June 13	Poprad-Tatry ATP Challenger Tour; Poprad, Slovakia; Clay – €42,500+H – 32S/32Q/16D; Singles – Doubles	(Argentina) Horacio Zeballos; 6–3, 6–4	(Austria) Gerald Melzer	(Slovakia) Martin Kližan (Slovakia) Andrej Martin	(Czech Republic) Adam Pavlásek (Spain) Rubén Ramírez Hidalgo (Belgium) Kimmer Coppejans (Slovakia) Jozef Kovalík
June 13	Poprad-Tatry ATP Challenger Tour; Poprad, Slovakia; Clay – €42,500+H – 32S/32Q/16D; Singles – Doubles	(Uruguay) Ariel Behar (Kazakhstan) Andrey Golubev; 6–2, 5–7, [10–5]	(Czech Republic) Lukáš Dlouhý (Slovakia) Andrej Martin	(Slovakia) Martin Kližan (Slovakia) Andrej Martin	(Czech Republic) Adam Pavlásek (Spain) Rubén Ramírez Hidalgo (Belgium) Kimmer Coppejans (Slovakia) Jozef Kovalík
June 13	Fergana Challenger; Fergana, Uzbekistan; Hard – $50,000+H – 32S/32Q/16D; Singles – Doubles	(Moldova) Radu Albot; 6–4, 6–2	(Russia) Konstantin Kravchuk	(Serbia) Nikola Milojević (South Korea) Lee Duck-hee	(Belarus) Ilya Ivashka (Russia) Alexander Kudryavtsev (Kazakhstan) Dmitry Popko (Japan) Shuichi Sekiguchi
June 13	Fergana Challenger; Fergana, Uzbekistan; Hard – $50,000+H – 32S/32Q/16D; Singles – Doubles	(France) Yannick Jankovits (Switzerland) Luca Margaroli; 6–4, 7–6^{(7–4)}	(Japan) Toshihide Matsui (India) Vishnu Vardhan	(Serbia) Nikola Milojević (South Korea) Lee Duck-hee	(Belarus) Ilya Ivashka (Russia) Alexander Kudryavtsev (Kazakhstan) Dmitry Popko (Japan) Shuichi Sekiguchi
June 13	Internationaux de Tennis de BLOIS; Blois, France; Clay – €42,500+H – 32S/32Q/16D; Singles – Doubles	(Argentina) Carlos Berlocq; 6–2, 6–0	(Belgium) Steve Darcis	(Netherlands) Antal van der Duim (France) Grégoire Barrère	(China) Zhang Ze (Germany) Andreas Beck (Serbia) Miljan Zekić (Netherlands) Scott Griekspoor
June 13	Internationaux de Tennis de BLOIS; Blois, France; Clay – €42,500+H – 32S/32Q/16D; Singles – Doubles	(Germany) Alexander Satschko (Germany) Simon Stadler; 6–3, 7–6^{(7–2)}	(China) Gong Maoxin (Japan) Yasutaka Uchiyama	(Netherlands) Antal van der Duim (France) Grégoire Barrère	(China) Zhang Ze (Germany) Andreas Beck (Serbia) Miljan Zekić (Netherlands) Scott Griekspoor
June 13	Aegon Ilkley Trophy; Ilkley, United Kingdom; Grass – €42,500 – 32S/32Q/16D; Singles – Doubles	(Chinese Taipei) Lu Yen-hsun; 7–6^{(7–4)}, 6–2	(France) Vincent Millot	(United Kingdom) Brydan Klein (Poland) Michał Przysiężny	(Australia) Jordan Thompson (United States) Ryan Harrison (France) Quentin Halys (Argentina) Renzo Olivo
June 13	Aegon Ilkley Trophy; Ilkley, United Kingdom; Grass – €42,500 – 32S/32Q/16D; Singles – Doubles	(Netherlands) Wesley Koolhof (Netherlands) Matwé Middelkoop; 7–6^{(7–5)}, 0–6, [10–8]	(Brazil) Marcelo Demoliner (Pakistan) Aisam-ul-Haq Qureshi	(United Kingdom) Brydan Klein (Poland) Michał Przysiężny	(Australia) Jordan Thompson (United States) Ryan Harrison (France) Quentin Halys (Argentina) Renzo Olivo
June 20	Aspria Tennis Cup; Milan, Italy; Clay – €42,500 – 32S/32Q/16D; Singles – Doubles	(Italy) Marco Cecchinato; 6–2, 6–2	(Serbia) Laslo Đere	(Argentina) Carlos Berlocq (Spain) Daniel Gimeno Traver	(Belgium) Arthur De Greef (Serbia) Miljan Zekić (Italy) Matteo Donati (Portugal) Gastão Elias
June 20	Aspria Tennis Cup; Milan, Italy; Clay – €42,500 – 32S/32Q/16D; Singles – Doubles	(Mexico) Miguel Ángel Reyes-Varela (United States) Max Schnur; 1–6, 7–6^{(7–4)}, [10–5]	(Italy) Alessandro Motti (Chinese Taipei) Peng Hsien-yin	(Argentina) Carlos Berlocq (Spain) Daniel Gimeno Traver	(Belgium) Arthur De Greef (Serbia) Miljan Zekić (Italy) Matteo Donati (Portugal) Gastão Elias
June 27	Marburg Open; Marburg, Germany; Clay – €42,500+H – 32S/32Q/16D; Singles – Doubles	(Czech Republic) Jan Šátral; 6–2, 6–4	(Argentina) Marco Trungelliti	(Germany) Daniel Brands (Belgium) Yannik Reuter	(Argentina) Nicolás Kicker (Bulgaria) Dimitar Kuzmanov (Italy) Andrea Arnaboldi (Spain) Daniel Gimeno Traver
June 27	Marburg Open; Marburg, Germany; Clay – €42,500+H – 32S/32Q/16D; Singles – Doubles	(United States) James Cerretani (Austria) Philipp Oswald; 6–3, 6–2	(Mexico) Miguel Ángel Reyes-Varela (United States) Max Schnur	(Germany) Daniel Brands (Belgium) Yannik Reuter	(Argentina) Nicolás Kicker (Bulgaria) Dimitar Kuzmanov (Italy) Andrea Arnaboldi (Spain) Daniel Gimeno Traver

=== July ===
Week of	Tournament	Champions	Runners-up	Semifinalists	Quarterfinalists
July 4	Sparkassen Open; Braunschweig, Germany; Clay – €106,500+H – 32S/32Q/16D; Singles – Doubles	(Brazil) Thomaz Bellucci; 6–1, 1–6, 6–3	(Spain) Íñigo Cervantes	(Russia) Teymuraz Gabashvili (Germany) Tobias Kamke	(Georgia (country)) Nikoloz Basilashvili (Japan) Taro Daniel (Moldova) Radu Albot (Germany) Mischa Zverev
July 4	Sparkassen Open; Braunschweig, Germany; Clay – €106,500+H – 32S/32Q/16D; Singles – Doubles	(United States) James Cerretani (Austria) Philipp Oswald; 4–6, 7–6^{(7–5)}, [10–2]	(Poland) Mateusz Kowalczyk (Croatia) Antonio Šančić	(Russia) Teymuraz Gabashvili (Germany) Tobias Kamke	(Georgia (country)) Nikoloz Basilashvili (Japan) Taro Daniel (Moldova) Radu Albot (Germany) Mischa Zverev
July 4	Nielsen Pro Tennis Championships; Winnetka, United States; Hard – $50,000 – 32S/32Q/16D; Singles – Doubles	(Japan) Yoshihito Nishioka; 6–3, 6–2	(United States) Frances Tiafoe	(Japan) Go Soeda (Germany) Peter Gojowczyk	(United States) Alexander Sarkissian (Canada) Frank Dancevic (United States) Mitchell Krueger (United States) Alex Kuznetsov
July 4	Nielsen Pro Tennis Championships; Winnetka, United States; Hard – $50,000 – 32S/32Q/16D; Singles – Doubles	(United States) Stefan Kozlov (Australia) John-Patrick Smith; 6–3, 6–3	(United States) Sekou Bangoura (Republic of Ireland) David O'Hare	(Japan) Go Soeda (Germany) Peter Gojowczyk	(United States) Alexander Sarkissian (Canada) Frank Dancevic (United States) Mitchell Krueger (United States) Alex Kuznetsov
July 4	Båstad Challenger; Båstad, Sweden; Clay – €42,500+H – 32S/32Q/16D; Singles – Doubles	(Argentina) Horacio Zeballos; 6–3, 6–4	(Spain) Roberto Carballés Baena	(Sweden) Carl Söderlund (Argentina) Carlos Berlocq	(Switzerland) Henri Laaksonen (Spain) Daniel Gimeno Traver (Spain) Albert Montañés (Serbia) Marko Tepavac
July 4	Båstad Challenger; Båstad, Sweden; Clay – €42,500+H – 32S/32Q/16D; Singles – Doubles	(Sweden) Isak Arvidsson (Sweden) Fred Simonsson; 6–3, 7–5	(Sweden) Johan Brunström (Sweden) Andreas Siljeström	(Sweden) Carl Söderlund (Argentina) Carlos Berlocq	(Switzerland) Henri Laaksonen (Spain) Daniel Gimeno Traver (Spain) Albert Montañés (Serbia) Marko Tepavac
July 4	Internazionali di Tennis dell'Umbria; Todi, Italy; Clay – €42,500+H – 32S/32Q/16D; Singles – Doubles	(Serbia) Miljan Zekić; 6–7^{(6–8)}, 6–4, 6–3	(Italy) Stefano Napolitano	(Argentina) Marco Trungelliti (Italy) Marco Cecchinato	(Slovakia) Andrej Martin (Italy) Luca Vanni (Hungary) Márton Fucsovics (Italy) Alessandro Giannessi
July 4	Internazionali di Tennis dell'Umbria; Todi, Italy; Clay – €42,500+H – 32S/32Q/16D; Singles – Doubles	(Brazil) Marcelo Demoliner (Brazil) Fabrício Neis; 6–1, 3–6, [10–5]	(Italy) Salvatore Caruso (Italy) Alessandro Giannessi	(Argentina) Marco Trungelliti (Italy) Marco Cecchinato	(Slovakia) Andrej Martin (Italy) Luca Vanni (Hungary) Márton Fucsovics (Italy) Alessandro Giannessi
July 4	Milo Open Cali; Cali, Colombia; Clay – $50,000+H – 32S/32Q/16D; Singles – Doubles	(Barbados) Darian King; 5–7, 6–4, 7–5	(Dominican Republic) Víctor Estrella Burgos	(Argentina) Federico Coria (Dominican Republic) José Hernández	(Colombia) Nicolás Barrientos (Chile) Marcelo Tomás Barrios Vera (Brazil) João Souza (Colombia) Cristian Rodríguez
July 4	Milo Open Cali; Cali, Colombia; Clay – $50,000+H – 32S/32Q/16D; Singles – Doubles	(Chile) Nicolás Jarry (Chile) Hans Podlipnik; 6–1, 7–6^{(8–6)}	(Italy) Erik Crepaldi (Brazil) Daniel Dutra da Silva	(Argentina) Federico Coria (Dominican Republic) José Hernández	(Colombia) Nicolás Barrientos (Chile) Marcelo Tomás Barrios Vera (Brazil) João Souza (Colombia) Cristian Rodríguez
July 11	Winnipeg National Bank Challenger; Winnipeg, Canada; Hard – $75,000 – 32S/32Q/14D; Singles – Doubles	(Japan) Go Soeda; 6–7^{(4–7)}, 6–4, 6–2	(Slovenia) Blaž Kavčič	(Germany) Peter Gojowczyk (Japan) Yoshihito Nishioka	(Canada) Philip Bester (United States) Daniel Nguyen (Japan) Hiroki Moriya (Canada) Peter Polansky
July 11	Winnipeg National Bank Challenger; Winnipeg, Canada; Hard – $75,000 – 32S/32Q/14D; Singles – Doubles	(United States) Mitchell Krueger (United States) Daniel Nguyen; 6–2, 7–5	(Australia) Jarryd Chaplin (Australia) Benjamin Mitchell	(Germany) Peter Gojowczyk (Japan) Yoshihito Nishioka	(Canada) Philip Bester (United States) Daniel Nguyen (Japan) Hiroki Moriya (Canada) Peter Polansky
July 11	San Benedetto Tennis Cup; San Benedetto del Tronto, Italy; Clay – €42,500+H – 32S/32Q/16D; Singles – Doubles	(Italy) Federico Gaio; 6–2, 1–6, 6–3	(France) Constant Lestienne	(Belgium) Arthur De Greef (Germany) Kevin Krawietz	(Italy) Gianluca Mager (Italy) Stefano Napolitano (Italy) Gianluigi Quinzi (Serbia) Laslo Đere
July 11	San Benedetto Tennis Cup; San Benedetto del Tronto, Italy; Clay – €42,500+H – 32S/32Q/16D; Singles – Doubles	(Italy) Federico Gaio (Italy) Stefano Napolitano; 6–3, 6–4	(Argentina) Facundo Argüello (Peru) Sergio Galdós	(Belgium) Arthur De Greef (Germany) Kevin Krawietz	(Italy) Gianluca Mager (Italy) Stefano Napolitano (Italy) Gianluigi Quinzi (Serbia) Laslo Đere
July 11	Poznań Open; Poznań, Poland; Clay – €42,500+H – 32S/32Q/16D; Singles – Doubles	(Moldova) Radu Albot; 6–2, 6–4	(Belgium) Clément Geens	(Kazakhstan) Aleksandr Nedovyesov (Belgium) Kimmer Coppejans	(Spain) Pere Riba (Serbia) Nikola Milojević (Spain) Rubén Ramírez Hidalgo (Spain) Jordi Samper Montaña
July 11	Poznań Open; Poznań, Poland; Clay – €42,500+H – 32S/32Q/16D; Singles – Doubles	(Georgia (country)) Aleksandre Metreveli (Chinese Taipei) Peng Hsien-yin; 6–4, 3–6, [10–8]	(Poland) Mateusz Kowalczyk (Poland) Kamil Majchrzak	(Kazakhstan) Aleksandr Nedovyesov (Belgium) Kimmer Coppejans	(Spain) Pere Riba (Serbia) Nikola Milojević (Spain) Rubén Ramírez Hidalgo (Spain) Jordi Samper Montaña
July 18	Gimcheon Open ATP Challenger; Gimcheon, South Korea; Hard – $50,000 – 32S/32Q/16D; Singles – Doubles	(Australia) Max Purcell; 3–6, 7–6^{(8–6)}, 5–1 ret.	(Australia) Andrew Whittington	(China) Li Zhe (South Korea) Kwon Soon-woo	(Japan) Takuto Niki (Israel) Edan Leshem (Chinese Taipei) Yang Tsung-hua (South Korea) Kim Cheong-eui
July 18	Gimcheon Open ATP Challenger; Gimcheon, South Korea; Hard – $50,000 – 32S/32Q/16D; Singles – Doubles	(Chinese Taipei) Hsieh Cheng-peng (Chinese Taipei) Yang Tsung-hua; Walkover	(Colombia) Nicolás Barrientos (Philippines) Ruben Gonzales	(China) Li Zhe (South Korea) Kwon Soon-woo	(Japan) Takuto Niki (Israel) Edan Leshem (Chinese Taipei) Yang Tsung-hua (South Korea) Kim Cheong-eui
July 18	Levene Gouldin & Thompson Tennis Challenger; Binghamton, United States; Hard – $50,000 – 32S/32Q/16D; Singles – Doubles	(Barbados) Darian King; 6–2, 6–3	(United States) Mitchell Krueger	(India) Ramkumar Ramanathan (Kazakhstan) Andrey Golubev	(United Kingdom) Brydan Klein (Japan) Hiroki Moriya (United States) Stefan Kozlov (United Kingdom) Lloyd Glasspool
July 18	Levene Gouldin & Thompson Tennis Challenger; Binghamton, United States; Hard – $50,000 – 32S/32Q/16D; Singles – Doubles	(Australia) Matt Reid (Australia) John-Patrick Smith; 6–4, 6–2	(United Kingdom) Liam Broady (Brazil) Guilherme Clezar	(India) Ramkumar Ramanathan (Kazakhstan) Andrey Golubev	(United Kingdom) Brydan Klein (Japan) Hiroki Moriya (United States) Stefan Kozlov (United Kingdom) Lloyd Glasspool
July 18	Guzzini Challenger; Recanati, Italy; Hard – €42,500+H – 32S/32Q/15D; Singles – Doubles	(Ukraine) Illya Marchenko; 6–4, 6–4	(Belarus) Ilya Ivashka	(Russia) Evgeny Donskoy (Hungary) Márton Fucsovics	(Italy) Luca Vanni (Spain) Adrián Menéndez Maceiras (Belgium) Ruben Bemelmans (Italy) Alessandro Bega
July 18	Guzzini Challenger; Recanati, Italy; Hard – €42,500+H – 32S/32Q/15D; Singles – Doubles	(Germany) Kevin Krawietz (France) Albano Olivetti; 6–3, 7–6^{(7–4)}	(Belgium) Ruben Bemelmans (Spain) Adrián Menéndez Maceiras	(Russia) Evgeny Donskoy (Hungary) Márton Fucsovics	(Italy) Luca Vanni (Spain) Adrián Menéndez Maceiras (Belgium) Ruben Bemelmans (Italy) Alessandro Bega
July 18	Tampere Open; Tampere, Finland; Clay – €42,500+H – 32S/32Q/16D; Singles – Doubles	(Belgium) Kimmer Coppejans; 6–4, 3–6, 7–5	(Russia) Aslan Karatsev	(Spain) Rubén Ramírez Hidalgo (Portugal) Pedro Sousa	(Sweden) Markus Eriksson (France) Gleb Sakharov (Brazil) João Souza (Poland) Hubert Hurkacz
July 18	Tampere Open; Tampere, Finland; Clay – €42,500+H – 32S/32Q/16D; Singles – Doubles	(Spain) David Pérez Sanz (United States) Max Schnur; 6–4, 6–4	(Australia) Steven de Waard (Germany) Andreas Mies	(Spain) Rubén Ramírez Hidalgo (Portugal) Pedro Sousa	(Sweden) Markus Eriksson (France) Gleb Sakharov (Brazil) João Souza (Poland) Hubert Hurkacz
July 25	Thindown Challenger Biella; Biella, Italy; Clay – €85,000+H – 32S/32Q/16D; Singles – Doubles	(Italy) Federico Gaio; 7–6^{(7–5)}, 6–2	(Brazil) Thomaz Bellucci	(Brazil) João Souza (Italy) Stefano Napolitano	(Slovakia) Andrej Martin (Spain) Enrique López Pérez (Serbia) Dušan Lajović (Argentina) Guido Andreozzi
July 25	Thindown Challenger Biella; Biella, Italy; Clay – €85,000+H – 32S/32Q/16D; Singles – Doubles	(Germany) Andre Begemann (India) Leander Paes; 6–4, 6–4	(Slovakia) Andrej Martin (Chile) Hans Podlipnik	(Brazil) João Souza (Italy) Stefano Napolitano	(Slovakia) Andrej Martin (Spain) Enrique López Pérez (Serbia) Dušan Lajović (Argentina) Guido Andreozzi
July 25	Open Castilla y León; Segovia, Spain; Hard – €64,000+H – 32S/32Q/15D; Singles – Doubles	(Italy) Luca Vanni; 6–4, 3–6, 6–3	(Ukraine) Illya Marchenko	(Bosnia and Herzegovina) Mirza Bašić (Hungary) Márton Fucsovics	(Spain) Nicolás Almagro (Japan) Akira Santillan (France) Kenny de Schepper (Spain) Adrián Menéndez Maceiras
July 25	Open Castilla y León; Segovia, Spain; Hard – €64,000+H – 32S/32Q/15D; Singles – Doubles	(India) Purav Raja (India) Divij Sharan; 6–3, 4–6, [10–8]	(Spain) Quino Muñoz (Japan) Akira Santillan	(Bosnia and Herzegovina) Mirza Bašić (Hungary) Márton Fucsovics	(Spain) Nicolás Almagro (Japan) Akira Santillan (France) Kenny de Schepper (Spain) Adrián Menéndez Maceiras
July 25	President's Cup; Astana, Kazakhstan; Hard – $75,000 – 32S/32Q/16D; Singles – Doubles	(Russia) Evgeny Donskoy; 6–3, 6–3	(Russia) Konstantin Kravchuk	(Belarus) Ilya Ivashka (Uzbekistan) Denis Istomin	(Serbia) Miki Janković (Russia) Alexander Bublik (South Korea) Lee Duck-hee (Russia) Daniil Medvedev
July 25	President's Cup; Astana, Kazakhstan; Hard – $75,000 – 32S/32Q/16D; Singles – Doubles	(Belarus) Yaraslav Shyla (Belarus) Andrei Vasilevski; 6–4, 6–4	(Russia) Mikhail Elgin (Russia) Alexander Kudryavtsev	(Belarus) Ilya Ivashka (Uzbekistan) Denis Istomin	(Serbia) Miki Janković (Russia) Alexander Bublik (South Korea) Lee Duck-hee (Russia) Daniil Medvedev
July 25	Advantage Cars Prague Open; Prague, Czech Republic; Clay – €42,500+H – 32S/32Q/16D; Singles – Doubles	(Colombia) Santiago Giraldo; 6–4, 3–6, 7–6^{(7–2)}	(Belarus) Uladzimir Ignatik	(Czech Republic) Zdeněk Kolář (Moldova) Radu Albot	(Slovakia) Martin Kližan (Georgia (country)) Nikoloz Basilashvili (Slovenia) Blaž Rola (Switzerland) Henri Laaksonen
July 25	Advantage Cars Prague Open; Prague, Czech Republic; Clay – €42,500+H – 32S/32Q/16D; Singles – Doubles	(Austria) Julian Knowle (Slovakia) Igor Zelenay; 6–4, 7–5	(Argentina) Facundo Argüello (Chile) Julio Peralta	(Czech Republic) Zdeněk Kolář (Moldova) Radu Albot	(Slovakia) Martin Kližan (Georgia (country)) Nikoloz Basilashvili (Slovenia) Blaž Rola (Switzerland) Henri Laaksonen
July 25	The Hague Open; Scheveningen, Netherlands; Clay – €42,500+H – 32S/32Q/16D; Singles – Doubles	(Netherlands) Robin Haase; 6–4, 6–7^{(9–11)}, 6–2	(Czech Republic) Adam Pavlásek	(France) Constant Lestienne (Belgium) Yannik Reuter	(Netherlands) Boy Westerhof (Russia) Alexey Vatutin (Netherlands) Tallon Griekspoor (Portugal) Pedro Sousa
July 25	The Hague Open; Scheveningen, Netherlands; Clay – €42,500+H – 32S/32Q/16D; Singles – Doubles	(Netherlands) Wesley Koolhof (Netherlands) Matwé Middelkoop; 6–1, 3–6, [13–11]	(Netherlands) Tallon Griekspoor (Netherlands) Tim van Rijthoven	(France) Constant Lestienne (Belgium) Yannik Reuter	(Netherlands) Boy Westerhof (Russia) Alexey Vatutin (Netherlands) Tallon Griekspoor (Portugal) Pedro Sousa
July 25	Kentucky Bank Tennis Championships; Lexington, United States; Hard – $50,000 – 32S/32Q/16D; Singles – Doubles	(United States) Ernesto Escobedo; 6–2, 6–7^{(6–8)}, 7–6^{(7–3)}	(United States) Frances Tiafoe	(United States) Brian Baker (Australia) Andrew Whittington	(United States) Mitchell Krueger (United States) Alex Kuznetsov (United Kingdom) Lloyd Glasspool (United States) Daniel Nguyen
July 25	Kentucky Bank Tennis Championships; Lexington, United States; Hard – $50,000 – 32S/32Q/16D; Singles – Doubles	(Australia) Luke Saville (Australia) Jordan Thompson; 6–2, 7–5	(South Africa) Nicolaas Scholtz (South Africa) Tucker Vorster	(United States) Brian Baker (Australia) Andrew Whittington	(United States) Mitchell Krueger (United States) Alex Kuznetsov (United Kingdom) Lloyd Glasspool (United States) Daniel Nguyen

=== August ===
Week of	Tournament	Champions	Runners-up	Semifinalists	Quarterfinalists
August 1	Chengdu Challenger; Chengdu, China; Hard – $125,000 – 32S/32Q/16D; Singles – Doubles	(Chinese Taipei) Jason Jung; 6–4, 6–2	(Spain) Rubén Ramírez Hidalgo	(South Korea) Lee Duck-hee (Japan) Yuya Kibi	(China) Sun Fajing (Japan) Takuto Niki (China) Li Zhe (China) Zhang Ze
August 1	Chengdu Challenger; Chengdu, China; Hard – $125,000 – 32S/32Q/16D; Singles – Doubles	(China) Gong Maoxin (China) Zhang Ze; 6–3, 4–6, [13–11]	(China) Gao Xin (China) Li Zhe	(South Korea) Lee Duck-hee (Japan) Yuya Kibi	(China) Sun Fajing (Japan) Takuto Niki (China) Li Zhe (China) Zhang Ze
August 1	Challenger Banque Nationale de Granby; Granby, Canada; Hard – $100,000 – 32S/32Q/16D; Singles – Doubles	(United States) Frances Tiafoe; 6–1, 6–1	(El Salvador) Marcelo Arévalo	(United States) Sekou Bangoura (Japan) Yasutaka Uchiyama	(United States) Mitchell Krueger (Canada) Denis Shapovalov (Australia) Andrew Whittington (Republic of Ireland) James McGee
August 1	Challenger Banque Nationale de Granby; Granby, Canada; Hard – $100,000 – 32S/32Q/16D; Singles – Doubles	(Brazil) Guilherme Clezar (Colombia) Alejandro González; 3–6, 6–1, [12–10]	(India) Saketh Myneni (India) Sanam Singh	(United States) Sekou Bangoura (Japan) Yasutaka Uchiyama	(United States) Mitchell Krueger (Canada) Denis Shapovalov (Australia) Andrew Whittington (Republic of Ireland) James McGee
August 1	International Tennis Tournament of Cortina; Cortina d'Ampezzo, Italy; Clay – €42,500+H – 32S/32Q/16D; Singles – Doubles	(Brazil) João Souza; 6–4, 7–6^{(7–4)}	(Serbia) Laslo Đere	(Spain) Roberto Carballés Baena (Argentina) Guido Andreozzi	(Russia) Andrey Rublev (Argentina) Facundo Bagnis (Italy) Lorenzo Giustino (Italy) Matteo Donati
August 1	International Tennis Tournament of Cortina; Cortina d'Ampezzo, Italy; Clay – €42,500+H – 32S/32Q/16D; Singles – Doubles	(United States) James Cerretani (Austria) Philipp Oswald; 6–3, 6–2	(Spain) Roberto Carballés Baena (Chile) Cristian Garín	(Spain) Roberto Carballés Baena (Argentina) Guido Andreozzi	(Russia) Andrey Rublev (Argentina) Facundo Bagnis (Italy) Lorenzo Giustino (Italy) Matteo Donati
August 1	Svijany Open; Liberec, Czech Republic; Clay – €42,500+H – 32S/32Q/16D; Singles – Doubles	(Belgium) Arthur De Greef; 7–6^{(7–4)}, 6–3	(Belgium) Steve Darcis	(Belgium) Joris De Loore (Czech Republic) Václav Šafránek	(Italy) Riccardo Bellotti (Portugal) Pedro Sousa (Belgium) Germain Gigounon (France) Mathias Bourgue
August 1	Svijany Open; Liberec, Czech Republic; Clay – €42,500+H – 32S/32Q/16D; Singles – Doubles	(France) Jonathan Eysseric (Brazil) André Ghem; 6–0, 6–4	(Uruguay) Ariel Behar (Croatia) Dino Marcan	(Belgium) Joris De Loore (Czech Republic) Václav Šafránek	(Italy) Riccardo Bellotti (Portugal) Pedro Sousa (Belgium) Germain Gigounon (France) Mathias Bourgue
August 8	ZS-Sports China International Challenger; Qingdao, China; Clay – $125,000 – 32S/32Q/16D; Singles – Doubles	(Serbia) Janko Tipsarević; 1–6, 7–5, 6–1	(Spain) Rubén Ramírez Hidalgo	(Chinese Taipei) Jason Jung (Spain) Pere Riba	(Russia) Konstantin Kravchuk (Spain) Enrique López Pérez (China) Zhang Ze (Serbia) Danilo Petrović
August 8	ZS-Sports China International Challenger; Qingdao, China; Clay – $125,000 – 32S/32Q/16D; Singles – Doubles	(Serbia) Danilo Petrović (France) Tak Khunn Wang; 6–2, 4–6, [10–5]	(China) Gong Maoxin (China) Zhang Ze	(Chinese Taipei) Jason Jung (Spain) Pere Riba	(Russia) Konstantin Kravchuk (Spain) Enrique López Pérez (China) Zhang Ze (Serbia) Danilo Petrović
August 8	Nordic Naturals Challenger; Aptos, United States; Hard – $100,000 – 32S/32Q/15D; Singles – Doubles	(United Kingdom) Daniel Evans; 6–3, 6–4	(United Kingdom) Cameron Norrie	(United States) Bjorn Fratangelo (United States) Eric Quigley	(Republic of Ireland) James McGee (Australia) Marinko Matosevic (United States) Raymond Sarmiento (United States) Evan King
August 8	Nordic Naturals Challenger; Aptos, United States; Hard – $100,000 – 32S/32Q/15D; Singles – Doubles	(South Africa) Nicolaas Scholtz (South Africa) Tucker Vorster; 6–7^{(5–7)}, 6–3, [10–8]	(United States) Mackenzie McDonald (New Zealand) Ben McLachlan	(United States) Bjorn Fratangelo (United States) Eric Quigley	(Republic of Ireland) James McGee (Australia) Marinko Matosevic (United States) Raymond Sarmiento (United States) Evan King
August 8	Challenger Banque Nationale de Gatineau; Gatineau, Canada; Hard – $75,000 – 32S/32Q/15D; Singles – Doubles	(Canada) Peter Polansky; 3–6, 6–4, 0–0 ret.	(France) Vincent Millot	(Croatia) Matija Pecotić (Canada) Denis Shapovalov	(Canada) Filip Peliwo (Brazil) Guilherme Clezar (India) Saketh Myneni (Canada) Frank Dancevic
August 8	Challenger Banque Nationale de Gatineau; Gatineau, Canada; Hard – $75,000 – 32S/32Q/15D; Singles – Doubles	(France) Tristan Lamasine (Croatia) Franko Škugor; 6–3, 6–1	(Australia) Jarryd Chaplin (Australia) John-Patrick Smith	(Croatia) Matija Pecotić (Canada) Denis Shapovalov	(Canada) Filip Peliwo (Brazil) Guilherme Clezar (India) Saketh Myneni (Canada) Frank Dancevic
August 8	STRABAG Challenger Open; Trnava, Slovakia; Clay – €42,500+H – 32S/32Q/16D; Singles – Doubles	(Belgium) Steve Darcis; 6–3, 6–4	(Spain) Jordi Samper Montaña	(Japan) Akira Santillan (Canada) Steven Diez	(Belgium) Kimmer Coppejans (Poland) Hubert Hurkacz (Netherlands) Igor Sijsling (Czech Republic) Marek Michalička
August 8	STRABAG Challenger Open; Trnava, Slovakia; Clay – €42,500+H – 32S/32Q/16D; Singles – Doubles	(Belgium) Sander Gillé (Belgium) Joran Vliegen; 6–2, 7–5	(Poland) Tomasz Bednarek (Czech Republic) Roman Jebavý	(Japan) Akira Santillan (Canada) Steven Diez	(Belgium) Kimmer Coppejans (Poland) Hubert Hurkacz (Netherlands) Igor Sijsling (Czech Republic) Marek Michalička
August 8	Adriatic Challenger; Fano, Italy; Clay – €42,500 – 32S/32Q/16D; Singles – Doubles	(Brazil) João Souza; 6–4, 6–7^{(12–14)}, 6–2	(Argentina) Nicolás Kicker	(Italy) Salvatore Caruso (France) Axel Michon	(Italy) Francisco Bahamonde (Chile) Gonzalo Lama (Italy) Filippo Volandri (Italy) Matteo Donati
August 8	Adriatic Challenger; Fano, Italy; Clay – €42,500 – 32S/32Q/16D; Singles – Doubles	(Italy) Riccardo Ghedin (Italy) Alessandro Motti; 6–4, 6–4	(Austria) Lucas Miedler (Netherlands) Mark Vervoort	(Italy) Salvatore Caruso (France) Axel Michon	(Italy) Francisco Bahamonde (Chile) Gonzalo Lama (Italy) Filippo Volandri (Italy) Matteo Donati
August 8	Tilia Slovenia Open; Portorož, Slovenia; Hard – €42,500 – 32S/32Q/16D; Singles – Doubles	(Germany) Florian Mayer; 6–1, 6–2	(Russia) Daniil Medvedev	(Slovenia) Grega Žemlja (Russia) Alexander Kudryavtsev	(Spain) Adrián Menéndez Maceiras (Serbia) Marko Tepavac (Hungary) Márton Fucsovics (Argentina) Renzo Olivo
August 8	Tilia Slovenia Open; Portorož, Slovenia; Hard – €42,500 – 32S/32Q/16D; Singles – Doubles	(Belarus) Sergey Betov (Belarus) Ilya Ivashka; 1–6, 6–3, [10–4]	(Croatia) Tomislav Draganja (Croatia) Nino Serdarušić	(Slovenia) Grega Žemlja (Russia) Alexander Kudryavtsev	(Spain) Adrián Menéndez Maceiras (Serbia) Marko Tepavac (Hungary) Márton Fucsovics (Argentina) Renzo Olivo
August 15	Internazionali di Tennis del Friuli Venezia Giulia; Cordenons, Italy; Clay – €42,500+H – 32S/32Q/16D; Singles – Doubles	(Japan) Taro Daniel; 6–3, 6–4	(Spain) Daniel Gimeno Traver	(Italy) Paolo Lorenzi (Italy) Gianluigi Quinzi	(Serbia) Filip Krajinović (Czech Republic) Jan Mertl (Sweden) Elias Ymer (Italy) Lorenzo Sonego
August 15	Internazionali di Tennis del Friuli Venezia Giulia; Cordenons, Italy; Clay – €42,500+H – 32S/32Q/16D; Singles – Doubles	(Germany) Andre Begemann (Belarus) Aliaksandr Bury; 5–7, 6–4, [11–9]	(Czech Republic) Roman Jebavý (Czech Republic) Zdeněk Kolář	(Italy) Paolo Lorenzi (Italy) Gianluigi Quinzi	(Serbia) Filip Krajinović (Czech Republic) Jan Mertl (Sweden) Elias Ymer (Italy) Lorenzo Sonego
August 15	Cittadino Challenger; Meerbusch, Germany; Clay – €42,500 – 32S/32Q/11D; Singles – Doubles	(Germany) Florian Mayer; 7–6^{(7–4)}, 6–2	(Germany) Maximilian Marterer	(Germany) Daniel Masur (Belgium) Clément Geens	(Germany) Marc Sieber (Georgia (country)) Aleksandre Metreveli (Poland) Jerzy Janowicz (Spain) Roberto Carballés Baena
August 15	Cittadino Challenger; Meerbusch, Germany; Clay – €42,500 – 32S/32Q/11D; Singles – Doubles	(Russia) Mikhail Elgin (Belarus) Andrei Vasilevski; 7–6^{(8–6)}, 6–4	(Belgium) Sander Gillé (Belgium) Joran Vliegen	(Germany) Daniel Masur (Belgium) Clément Geens	(Germany) Marc Sieber (Georgia (country)) Aleksandre Metreveli (Poland) Jerzy Janowicz (Spain) Roberto Carballés Baena
August 22	Antonio Savoldi–Marco Cò – Trofeo Dimmidisì; Manerbio, Italy; Clay – €42,500+H – 32S/32Q/16D; Singles – Doubles	(Argentina) Leonardo Mayer; 7–6^{(7–3)}, 7–5	(Serbia) Filip Krajinović	(Italy) Matteo Donati (France) Jonathan Eysseric	(Austria) Gerald Melzer (Germany) Nils Langer (Italy) Lorenzo Sonego (Japan) Taro Daniel
August 22	Antonio Savoldi–Marco Cò – Trofeo Dimmidisì; Manerbio, Italy; Clay – €42,500+H – 32S/32Q/16D; Singles – Doubles	(Croatia) Nikola Mektić (Croatia) Antonio Šančić; 7–5, 6–1	(Argentina) Juan Ignacio Galarza (Argentina) Leonardo Mayer	(Italy) Matteo Donati (France) Jonathan Eysseric	(Austria) Gerald Melzer (Germany) Nils Langer (Italy) Lorenzo Sonego (Japan) Taro Daniel
August 29	Curitiba Challenger; Curitiba, Brazil; Clay – $50,000 – 32S/32Q/16D; Singles – Doubles	(Argentina) Agustín Velotti; 6–0, 6–4	(Brazil) André Ghem	(Spain) Pere Riba (Argentina) Nicolás Kicker	(Ecuador) Gonzalo Escobar (Spain) Rubén Ramírez Hidalgo (Argentina) Juan Ignacio Londero (Ecuador) Emilio Gómez
August 29	Curitiba Challenger; Curitiba, Brazil; Clay – $50,000 – 32S/32Q/16D; Singles – Doubles	(Spain) Rubén Ramírez Hidalgo (Spain) Pere Riba; 6–7^{(3–7)}, 6–4, [10–7]	(Brazil) André Ghem (Brazil) Fabrício Neis	(Spain) Pere Riba (Argentina) Nicolás Kicker	(Ecuador) Gonzalo Escobar (Spain) Rubén Ramírez Hidalgo (Argentina) Juan Ignacio Londero (Ecuador) Emilio Gómez
August 29	Wind Energy Holding Bangkok Open; Bangkok, Thailand; Hard – $50,000 – 32S/32Q/16D; Singles – Doubles	(Slovenia) Blaž Kavčič; 6–0, 1–0 ret.	(Japan) Go Soeda	(Australia) Marinko Matosevic (Slovakia) Norbert Gombos	(Chinese Taipei) Chen Ti (Israel) Edan Leshem (Japan) Yuya Kibi (China) Wu Di
August 29	Wind Energy Holding Bangkok Open; Bangkok, Thailand; Hard – $50,000 – 32S/32Q/16D; Singles – Doubles	(Thailand) Wishaya Trongcharoenchaikul (Thailand) Kittipong Wachiramanowong; 7–6^{(11–9)}, 6–3	(Thailand) Sanchai Ratiwatana (Thailand) Sonchat Ratiwatana	(Australia) Marinko Matosevic (Slovakia) Norbert Gombos	(Chinese Taipei) Chen Ti (Israel) Edan Leshem (Japan) Yuya Kibi (China) Wu Di
August 29	Città di Como Challenger; Como, Italy; Clay – €42,500 – 32S/32Q/16D; Singles – Doubles	(France) Kenny de Schepper; 2–6, 7–6^{(7–0)}, 7–5	(Italy) Marco Cecchinato	(Japan) Taro Daniel (Romania) Adrian Ungur	(Austria) Gerald Melzer (Germany) Nils Langer (Argentina) Leonardo Mayer (Argentina) Andrea Collarini
August 29	Città di Como Challenger; Como, Italy; Clay – €42,500 – 32S/32Q/16D; Singles – Doubles	(Czech Republic) Roman Jebavý (Slovakia) Andrej Martin; 3–6, 6–1, [10–5]	(Germany) Nils Langer (Austria) Gerald Melzer	(Japan) Taro Daniel (Romania) Adrian Ungur	(Austria) Gerald Melzer (Germany) Nils Langer (Argentina) Leonardo Mayer (Argentina) Andrea Collarini

=== September ===
Week of	Tournament	Champions	Runners-up	Semifinalists	Quarterfinalists
September 5	AON Open Challenger; Genoa, Italy; Clay – €106,500+H – 32S/32Q/16D; Singles – Doubles	(Poland) Jerzy Janowicz; 7–6^{(7–5)}, 6–4	(Spain) Nicolás Almagro	(Czech Republic) Adam Pavlásek (Argentina) Carlos Berlocq	(Uzbekistan) Denis Istomin (France) Kenny de Schepper (Slovakia) Jozef Kovalík (Italy) Gianluca Mager
September 5	AON Open Challenger; Genoa, Italy; Clay – €106,500+H – 32S/32Q/16D; Singles – Doubles	(Chile) Julio Peralta (Argentina) Horacio Zeballos; 6–4, 6–3	(Belarus) Aliaksandr Bury (Belarus) Andrei Vasilevski	(Czech Republic) Adam Pavlásek (Argentina) Carlos Berlocq	(Uzbekistan) Denis Istomin (France) Kenny de Schepper (Slovakia) Jozef Kovalík (Italy) Gianluca Mager
September 5	Claro Open Barranquilla; Barranquilla, Colombia; Clay – $50,000+H – 32S/32Q/16D; Singles – Doubles	(Argentina) Diego Schwartzman; 6–4, 6–1	(Brazil) Rogério Dutra Silva	(Colombia) Santiago Giraldo (Argentina) Máximo González	(Dominican Republic) José Hernández (Argentina) Agustín Velotti (Colombia) Alejandro González (Dominican Republic) Víctor Estrella Burgos
September 5	Claro Open Barranquilla; Barranquilla, Colombia; Clay – $50,000+H – 32S/32Q/16D; Singles – Doubles	(Colombia) Alejandro Falla (Colombia) Eduardo Struvay; 6–4, 7–5	(Ecuador) Gonzalo Escobar (Ecuador) Roberto Quiroz	(Colombia) Santiago Giraldo (Argentina) Máximo González	(Dominican Republic) José Hernández (Argentina) Agustín Velotti (Colombia) Alejandro González (Dominican Republic) Víctor Estrella Burgos
September 5	Shanghai Challenger; Shanghai, China; Hard – $50,000 – 32S/32Q/16D; Singles – Doubles	(Switzerland) Henri Laaksonen; 6–3, 6–3	(Chinese Taipei) Jason Jung	(Australia) Jordan Thompson (Japan) Yasutaka Uchiyama	(South Korea) Kwon Soon-woo (Japan) Go Soeda (United States) Alexander Sarkissian (Slovenia) Blaž Kavčič
September 5	Shanghai Challenger; Shanghai, China; Hard – $50,000 – 32S/32Q/16D; Singles – Doubles	(Chinese Taipei) Hsieh Cheng-peng (Chinese Taipei) Yi Chu-huan; 7–6^{(8–6)}, 5–7, [10–0]	(China) Gao Xin (China) Li Zhe	(Australia) Jordan Thompson (Japan) Yasutaka Uchiyama	(South Korea) Kwon Soon-woo (Japan) Go Soeda (United States) Alexander Sarkissian (Slovenia) Blaž Kavčič
September 5	Copa Sevilla; Seville, Spain; Clay – €42,500+H – 32S/32Q/16D; Singles – Doubles	(Norway) Casper Ruud; 6–3, 6–4	(Japan) Taro Daniel	(Argentina) Pedro Cachin (Poland) Kamil Majchrzak	(Spain) Íñigo Cervantes (Belgium) Arthur De Greef (Russia) Andrey Rublev (Austria) Gerald Melzer
September 5	Copa Sevilla; Seville, Spain; Clay – €42,500+H – 32S/32Q/16D; Singles – Doubles	(Spain) Íñigo Cervantes (Spain) Oriol Roca Batalla; 6–2, 6–5 ret.	(Uruguay) Ariel Behar (Spain) Enrique López Pérez	(Argentina) Pedro Cachin (Poland) Kamil Majchrzak	(Spain) Íñigo Cervantes (Belgium) Arthur De Greef (Russia) Andrey Rublev (Austria) Gerald Melzer
September 5	TEAN International; Alphen aan den Rijn, Netherlands; Clay – €42,500 – 32S/32Q/16D; Singles – Doubles	(Germany) Jan-Lennard Struff; 6–4, 6–1	(Netherlands) Robin Haase	(Netherlands) Thiemo de Bakker (Bosnia and Herzegovina) Damir Džumhur	(France) Constant Lestienne (Germany) Cedrik-Marcel Stebe (Croatia) Franko Škugor (Germany) Daniel Masur
September 5	TEAN International; Alphen aan den Rijn, Netherlands; Clay – €42,500 – 32S/32Q/16D; Singles – Doubles	(Germany) Daniel Masur (Germany) Jan-Lennard Struff; 6–4, 6–1	(Netherlands) Robin Haase (Netherlands) Boy Westerhof	(Netherlands) Thiemo de Bakker (Bosnia and Herzegovina) Damir Džumhur	(France) Constant Lestienne (Germany) Cedrik-Marcel Stebe (Croatia) Franko Škugor (Germany) Daniel Masur
September 5	Trophée des Alpilles; Saint-Rémy-de-Provence, France; Hard – €42,500 – 32S/32Q/16D; Singles – Doubles	(Russia) Daniil Medvedev; 6–3, 6–3	(Belgium) Joris De Loore	(Bosnia and Herzegovina) Mirza Bašić (Russia) Konstantin Kravchuk	(France) Alexandre Müller (Argentina) Marco Trungelliti (France) Quentin Halys (France) Albano Olivetti
September 5	Trophée des Alpilles; Saint-Rémy-de-Provence, France; Hard – €42,500 – 32S/32Q/16D; Singles – Doubles	(United Kingdom) Ken Skupski (United Kingdom) Neal Skupski; 6–7^{(5–7)}, 6–4, [10–5]	(Republic of Ireland) David O'Hare (United Kingdom) Joe Salisbury	(Bosnia and Herzegovina) Mirza Bašić (Russia) Konstantin Kravchuk	(France) Alexandre Müller (Argentina) Marco Trungelliti (France) Quentin Halys (France) Albano Olivetti
September 12	Pekao Szczecin Open; Szczecin, Poland; Clay – €106,500+H – 32S/32Q/16D; Singles – Doubles	(Italy) Alessandro Giannessi; 6–2, 6–3	(Germany) Dustin Brown	(France) Jonathan Eysseric (France) Constant Lestienne	(Italy) Marco Cecchinato (Italy) Salvatore Caruso (Italy) Stefano Napolitano (Spain) Albert Montañés
September 12	Pekao Szczecin Open; Szczecin, Poland; Clay – €106,500+H – 32S/32Q/16D; Singles – Doubles	(Germany) Andre Begemann (Belarus) Aliaksandr Bury; 7–6^{(7–3)}, 6–7^{(7–9)}, [10–4]	(Sweden) Johan Brunström (Sweden) Andreas Siljeström	(France) Jonathan Eysseric (France) Constant Lestienne	(Italy) Marco Cecchinato (Italy) Salvatore Caruso (Italy) Stefano Napolitano (Spain) Albert Montañés
September 12	Amex-Istanbul Challenger; Istanbul, Turkey; Hard – $75,000 – 32S/32Q/16D; Singles – Doubles	(Tunisia) Malek Jaziri; 1–6, 6–1, 6–0	(Israel) Dudi Sela	(Germany) Tobias Kamke (Switzerland) Marco Chiudinelli	(Germany) Marc Sieber (Romania) Marius Copil (Turkey) Marsel İlhan (Czech Republic) Michal Konečný
September 12	Amex-Istanbul Challenger; Istanbul, Turkey; Hard – $75,000 – 32S/32Q/16D; Singles – Doubles	(France) Sadio Doumbia (France) Calvin Hemery; 6–4, 6–3	(Switzerland) Marco Chiudinelli (Romania) Marius Copil	(Germany) Tobias Kamke (Switzerland) Marco Chiudinelli	(Germany) Marc Sieber (Romania) Marius Copil (Turkey) Marsel İlhan (Czech Republic) Michal Konečný
September 12	ATP Challenger China International – Nanchang; Nanchang, China; Hard – $75,000+H – 32S/32Q/16D; Singles – Doubles	(Japan) Hiroki Moriya; 4–6, 6–1, 6–4	(South Korea) Chung Hyeon	(Australia) Marinko Matosevic (Chinese Taipei) Jason Jung	(China) Zhang Ze (United States) Alexander Sarkissian (Slovenia) Blaž Kavčič (Australia) Jordan Thompson
September 12	ATP Challenger China International – Nanchang; Nanchang, China; Hard – $75,000+H – 32S/32Q/16D; Singles – Doubles	(China) Wu Di (China) Zhang Zhizhen; 7–6^{(7–4)}, 6–3	(Colombia) Nicolás Barrientos (Philippines) Ruben Gonzales	(Australia) Marinko Matosevic (Chinese Taipei) Jason Jung	(China) Zhang Ze (United States) Alexander Sarkissian (Slovenia) Blaž Kavčič (Australia) Jordan Thompson
September 12	Banja Luka Challenger; Banja Luka, Bosnia and Herzegovina; Clay – €64,000+H – 32S/32Q/16D; Singles – Doubles	(Czech Republic) Adam Pavlásek; 3–6, 6–1, 6–4	(Serbia) Miljan Zekić	(United Kingdom) Aljaž Bedene (Spain) Pablo Andújar	(Argentina) Horacio Zeballos (Czech Republic) Václav Šafránek (Czech Republic) Jan Šátral (Argentina) Carlos Berlocq
September 12	Banja Luka Challenger; Banja Luka, Bosnia and Herzegovina; Clay – €64,000+H – 32S/32Q/16D; Singles – Doubles	(Czech Republic) Roman Jebavý (Czech Republic) Jan Šátral; 7–6^{(7–3)}, 4–6, [10–7]	(Italy) Andrea Arnaboldi (Austria) Maximilian Neuchrist	(United Kingdom) Aljaž Bedene (Spain) Pablo Andújar	(Argentina) Horacio Zeballos (Czech Republic) Václav Šafránek (Czech Republic) Jan Šátral (Argentina) Carlos Berlocq
September 12	Cary Challenger; Cary, United States; Hard – $50,000 – 32S/32Q/16D; Singles – Doubles	(Republic of Ireland) James McGee; 1–6, 6–1, 6–4	(United States) Ernesto Escobedo	(United States) Dennis Novikov (United States) Frances Tiafoe	(Canada) Peter Polansky (Canada) Brayden Schnur (United States) Stefan Kozlov (United States) Tennys Sandgren
September 12	Cary Challenger; Cary, United States; Hard – $50,000 – 32S/32Q/16D; Singles – Doubles	(Canada) Philip Bester (Canada) Peter Polansky; 6–2, 6–2	(United States) Stefan Kozlov (United States) Austin Krajicek	(United States) Dennis Novikov (United States) Frances Tiafoe	(Canada) Peter Polansky (Canada) Brayden Schnur (United States) Stefan Kozlov (United States) Tennys Sandgren
September 12	Morocco Tennis Tour – Meknes; Meknes, Morocco; Clay – €42,500 – 32S/32Q/16D; Singles – Doubles	(Germany) Maximilian Marterer; 7–6^{(7–3)}, 6–3	(Belarus) Uladzimir Ignatik	(Spain) Pedro Martínez (Spain) Oriol Roca Batalla	(Germany) Jeremy Jahn (Egypt) Mohamed Safwat (Germany) Nils Langer (Belgium) Arthur De Greef
September 12	Morocco Tennis Tour – Meknes; Meknes, Morocco; Clay – €42,500 – 32S/32Q/16D; Singles – Doubles	(Switzerland) Luca Margaroli (Egypt) Mohamed Safwat; 6–4, 6–4	(Spain) Pedro Martínez (Spain) Oriol Roca Batalla	(Spain) Pedro Martínez (Spain) Oriol Roca Batalla	(Germany) Jeremy Jahn (Egypt) Mohamed Safwat (Germany) Nils Langer (Belgium) Arthur De Greef
September 19	OEC Kaohsiung; Kaohsiung, Taiwan; Hard – $125,000+H – 32S/32Q/16D; Singles – Doubles	(South Korea) Chung Hyeon; 6–4, 6–2	(South Korea) Lee Duck-hee	(Japan) Yūichi Sugita (Chinese Taipei) Lu Yen-hsun	(Japan) Yasutaka Uchiyama (Croatia) Matija Pecotić (Israel) Amir Weintraub (Japan) Yuya Kibi
September 19	OEC Kaohsiung; Kaohsiung, Taiwan; Hard – $125,000+H – 32S/32Q/16D; Singles – Doubles	(Thailand) Sanchai Ratiwatana (Thailand) Sonchat Ratiwatana; 6–4, 7–6^{(7–4)}	(Chinese Taipei) Hsieh Cheng-peng (Chinese Taipei) Yi Chu-huan	(Japan) Yūichi Sugita (Chinese Taipei) Lu Yen-hsun	(Japan) Yasutaka Uchiyama (Croatia) Matija Pecotić (Israel) Amir Weintraub (Japan) Yuya Kibi
September 19	Türk Telecom İzmir Cup; İzmir, Turkey; Hard – €64,000 – 32S/32Q/16D; Singles – Doubles	(Turkey) Marsel İlhan; 6–2, 6–4	(Turkey) Cem İlkel	(Slovakia) Norbert Gombos (Bosnia and Herzegovina) Mirza Bašić	(Slovakia) Lukáš Lacko (Belgium) Kimmer Coppejans (Belarus) Ilya Ivashka (Romania) Marius Copil
September 19	Türk Telecom İzmir Cup; İzmir, Turkey; Hard – €64,000 – 32S/32Q/16D; Singles – Doubles	(Switzerland) Marco Chiudinelli (Romania) Marius Copil; 6–4, 6–4	(France) Sadio Doumbia (France) Calvin Hemery	(Slovakia) Norbert Gombos (Bosnia and Herzegovina) Mirza Bašić	(Slovakia) Lukáš Lacko (Belgium) Kimmer Coppejans (Belarus) Ilya Ivashka (Romania) Marius Copil
September 19	Columbus Challenger 1 Columbus, United States; Hard (i) – $50,000 – 32S/32Q/16D; Singles – Doubles	(Denmark) Mikael Torpegaard; 6–4, 1–6, 6–2	(Germany) Benjamin Becker	(Australia) John-Patrick Smith (United States) Tennys Sandgren	(Latvia) Miķelis Lībietis (United States) Sekou Bangoura (United States) Gonzales Austin (Ecuador) Roberto Quiroz
September 19	Columbus Challenger 1 Columbus, United States; Hard (i) – $50,000 – 32S/32Q/16D; Singles – Doubles	(Latvia) Miķelis Lībietis (United States) Dennis Novikov; 7–5, 7–6^{(7–4)}	(Canada) Philip Bester (Canada) Peter Polansky	(Australia) John-Patrick Smith (United States) Tennys Sandgren	(Latvia) Miķelis Lībietis (United States) Sekou Bangoura (United States) Gonzales Austin (Ecuador) Roberto Quiroz
September 19	Sibiu Open; Sibiu, Romania; Clay – €42,500+H – 32S/32Q/16D; Singles – Doubles	(Netherlands) Robin Haase; 7–6^{(7–2)}, 6–2	(Italy) Lorenzo Giustino	(Germany) Tim Pütz (Australia) Christopher O'Connell	(Austria) Dennis Novak (Romania) Adrian Ungur (Czech Republic) Jan Šátral (Czech Republic) Václav Šafránek
September 19	Sibiu Open; Sibiu, Romania; Clay – €42,500+H – 32S/32Q/16D; Singles – Doubles	(Netherlands) Robin Haase (Germany) Tim Pütz; 6–4, 6–2	(France) Jonathan Eysseric (France) Tristan Lamasine	(Germany) Tim Pütz (Australia) Christopher O'Connell	(Austria) Dennis Novak (Romania) Adrian Ungur (Czech Republic) Jan Šátral (Czech Republic) Václav Šafránek
September 19	Morocco Tennis Tour – Kenitra; Kenitra, Morocco; Clay – €42,500 – 32S/32Q/14D; Singles – Doubles	(Germany) Maximilian Marterer; 6–2, 6–4	(Egypt) Mohamed Safwat	(Spain) Pablo Andújar (Germany) Jeremy Jahn	(Canada) Steven Diez (Belarus) Uladzimir Ignatik (Spain) Rubén Ramírez Hidalgo (Germany) Daniel Masur
September 19	Morocco Tennis Tour – Kenitra; Kenitra, Morocco; Clay – €42,500 – 32S/32Q/14D; Singles – Doubles	(Germany) Kevin Krawietz (Germany) Maximilian Marterer; 7–6^{(8–6)}, 4–6, [10–6]	(Belarus) Uladzimir Ignatik (Austria) Michael Linzer	(Spain) Pablo Andújar (Germany) Jeremy Jahn	(Canada) Steven Diez (Belarus) Uladzimir Ignatik (Spain) Rubén Ramírez Hidalgo (Germany) Daniel Masur
September 19	Campeonato Internacional de Tenis de Santos; Santos, Brazil; Clay – $50,000 – 32S/32Q/16D; Singles – Doubles	(Argentina) Renzo Olivo; 6–4, 7–6^{(7–5)}	(Brazil) Thiago Monteiro	(Argentina) Agustín Velotti (Argentina) Máximo González	(Argentina) Facundo Bagnis (Argentina) Guido Andreozzi (Brazil) Rogério Dutra Silva (Argentina) Nicolás Kicker
September 19	Campeonato Internacional de Tenis de Santos; Santos, Brazil; Clay – $50,000 – 32S/32Q/16D; Singles – Doubles	(Peru) Sergio Galdós (Argentina) Máximo González; 6–3, 5–7, [14–12]	(Brazil) Rogério Dutra Silva (Brazil) Fabrício Neis	(Argentina) Agustín Velotti (Argentina) Máximo González	(Argentina) Facundo Bagnis (Argentina) Guido Andreozzi (Brazil) Rogério Dutra Silva (Argentina) Nicolás Kicker
September 26	Open d'Orléans; Orléans, France; Hard (i) – €106,500+H – 32S/32Q/16D; Singles – Doubles	(France) Pierre-Hugues Herbert; 7–5, 4–6, 6–3	(Slovakia) Norbert Gombos	(Germany) Daniel Brands (Russia) Andrey Rublev	(Belgium) Ruben Bemelmans (Russia) Daniil Medvedev (Switzerland) Marco Chiudinelli (Germany) Dustin Brown
September 26	Open d'Orléans; Orléans, France; Hard (i) – €106,500+H – 32S/32Q/16D; Singles – Doubles	(Croatia) Nikola Mektić (Croatia) Franko Škugor; 6–2, 7–5	(Uruguay) Ariel Behar (Belarus) Andrei Vasilevski	(Germany) Daniel Brands (Russia) Andrey Rublev	(Belgium) Ruben Bemelmans (Russia) Daniil Medvedev (Switzerland) Marco Chiudinelli (Germany) Dustin Brown
September 26	Tiburon Challenger; Tiburon, United States; Hard – $100,000 – 32S/32Q/16D; Singles – Doubles	(Barbados) Darian King; 7–6^{(7–2)}, 6–2	(United States) Michael Mmoh	(United States) Mackenzie McDonald (United States) Tim Smyczek	(United States) Dennis Novikov (United States) Frances Tiafoe (United States) Mitchell Krueger (United States) Bjorn Fratangelo
September 26	Tiburon Challenger; Tiburon, United States; Hard – $100,000 – 32S/32Q/16D; Singles – Doubles	(Australia) Matt Reid (Australia) John-Patrick Smith; 6–1, 6–2	(France) Quentin Halys (United States) Dennis Novikov	(United States) Mackenzie McDonald (United States) Tim Smyczek	(United States) Dennis Novikov (United States) Frances Tiafoe (United States) Mitchell Krueger (United States) Bjorn Fratangelo
September 26	Claro Open Medellín; Medellín, Colombia; Clay – $50,000+H – 32S/32Q/16D; Singles – Doubles	(Argentina) Facundo Bagnis; 6–7^{(3–7)}, 7–5, 6–2	(Brazil) Caio Zampieri	(Brazil) Rogério Dutra Silva (Brazil) João Souza	(Colombia) Alejandro Falla (Colombia) Eduardo Struvay (Dominican Republic) José Hernández (Colombia) Santiago Giraldo
September 26	Claro Open Medellín; Medellín, Colombia; Clay – $50,000+H – 32S/32Q/16D; Singles – Doubles	(Colombia) Alejandro Falla (Colombia) Eduardo Struvay; 6–3, 6–2	(Brazil) André Ghem (Spain) Juan Lizariturry	(Brazil) Rogério Dutra Silva (Brazil) João Souza	(Colombia) Alejandro Falla (Colombia) Eduardo Struvay (Dominican Republic) José Hernández (Colombia) Santiago Giraldo
September 26	BFD Energy Challenger; Rome, Italy; Clay – €42,500+H – 32S/32Q/13D; Singles – Doubles	(Czech Republic) Jan Šátral; 6–3, 6–2	(Netherlands) Robin Haase	(France) Tristan Lamasine (Sweden) Mikael Ymer	(Slovakia) Andrej Martin (Sweden) Elias Ymer (United Kingdom) Aljaž Bedene (Hungary) Márton Fucsovics
September 26	BFD Energy Challenger; Rome, Italy; Clay – €42,500+H – 32S/32Q/13D; Singles – Doubles	(Italy) Federico Gaio (Italy) Stefano Napolitano; 6–7^{(2–7)}, 6–2, [10–3]	(Croatia) Marin Draganja (Croatia) Tomislav Draganja	(France) Tristan Lamasine (Sweden) Mikael Ymer	(Slovakia) Andrej Martin (Sweden) Elias Ymer (United Kingdom) Aljaž Bedene (Hungary) Márton Fucsovics

=== October ===
Week of	Tournament	Champions	Runners-up	Semifinalists	Quarterfinalists
October 3	Ethias Trophy; Mons, Belgium; Hard (i) – €106,500+H – 32S/32Q/16D; Singles – Doubles	(Germany) Jan-Lennard Struff; 6−2, 6−0	(France) Vincent Millot	(Germany) Daniel Brands (Russia) Daniil Medvedev	(Lithuania) Ričardas Berankis (Russia) Andrey Rublev (France) Paul-Henri Mathieu (Austria) Jürgen Melzer
October 3	Ethias Trophy; Mons, Belgium; Hard (i) – €106,500+H – 32S/32Q/16D; Singles – Doubles	(Austria) Julian Knowle (Austria) Jürgen Melzer; 7–6^{(7–4)}, 7–6^{(7–4)}	(Netherlands) Sander Arends (Netherlands) Wesley Koolhof	(Germany) Daniel Brands (Russia) Daniil Medvedev	(Lithuania) Ričardas Berankis (Russia) Andrey Rublev (France) Paul-Henri Mathieu (Austria) Jürgen Melzer
October 3	Stockton ATP Challenger; Stockton, United States; Hard – $100,000 – 32S/32Q/16D; Singles – Doubles	(United States) Frances Tiafoe; 6–4, 6–2	(United States) Noah Rubin	(United States) Michael Mmoh (United States) Mackenzie McDonald	(Canada) Frank Dancevic (Barbados) Darian King (Italy) Alessandro Giannessi (United States) Denis Kudla
October 3	Stockton ATP Challenger; Stockton, United States; Hard – $100,000 – 32S/32Q/16D; Singles – Doubles	(United States) Brian Baker (Australia) Sam Groth; 6–2, 4–6, [10–2]	(Australia) Matt Reid (Australia) John-Patrick Smith	(United States) Michael Mmoh (United States) Mackenzie McDonald	(Canada) Frank Dancevic (Barbados) Darian King (Italy) Alessandro Giannessi (United States) Denis Kudla
October 3	Morocco Tennis Tour – Mohammedia; Mohammedia, Morocco; Clay – €42,500 – 32S/32Q/16D; Singles – Doubles	(Austria) Gerald Melzer; 3–6, 6–3, 6–2	(Greece) Stefanos Tsitsipas	(Poland) Kamil Majchrzak (Belarus) Uladzimir Ignatik	(Bosnia and Herzegovina) Damir Džumhur (Spain) Daniel Gimeno Traver (Spain) Roberto Carballés Baena (Slovakia) Andrej Martin
October 3	Morocco Tennis Tour – Mohammedia; Mohammedia, Morocco; Clay – €42,500 – 32S/32Q/16D; Singles – Doubles	(Croatia) Dino Marcan (Croatia) Antonio Šančić; 7–6^{(7–3)}, 6–4	(Czech Republic) Roman Jebavý (Slovakia) Andrej Martin	(Poland) Kamil Majchrzak (Belarus) Uladzimir Ignatik	(Bosnia and Herzegovina) Damir Džumhur (Spain) Daniel Gimeno Traver (Spain) Roberto Carballés Baena (Slovakia) Andrej Martin
October 3	Campeonato Internacional de Tênis de Campinas; Campinas, Brazil; Clay – $40,000+H – 32S/32Q/16D; Singles – Doubles	(Argentina) Facundo Bagnis; 5–7, 6–2, 3–0 ret.	(Argentina) Carlos Berlocq	(Portugal) Pedro Sousa (Brazil) Rogério Dutra Silva	(Argentina) Tomás Lipovšek Puches (Argentina) Juan Ignacio Londero (Argentina) Guido Andreozzi (Brazil) Thiago Monteiro
October 3	Campeonato Internacional de Tênis de Campinas; Campinas, Brazil; Clay – $40,000+H – 32S/32Q/16D; Singles – Doubles	(Argentina) Federico Coria (Argentina) Tomás Lipovšek Puches; 7–5, 6–2	(Peru) Sergio Galdós (Argentina) Máximo González	(Portugal) Pedro Sousa (Brazil) Rogério Dutra Silva	(Argentina) Tomás Lipovšek Puches (Argentina) Juan Ignacio Londero (Argentina) Guido Andreozzi (Brazil) Thiago Monteiro
October 10	Tashkent Challenger; Tashkent, Uzbekistan; Hard – $125,000+H – 32S/32Q/16D; Singles – Doubles	(Russia) Konstantin Kravchuk; 7–5, 6–4	(Uzbekistan) Denis Istomin	(Bosnia and Herzegovina) Mirza Bašić (Slovakia) Lukáš Lacko	(Russia) Alexander Bublik (Uzbekistan) Sanjar Fayziev (Croatia) Ivan Dodig (France) Jérémy Chardy
October 10	Tashkent Challenger; Tashkent, Uzbekistan; Hard – $125,000+H – 32S/32Q/16D; Singles – Doubles	(Russia) Mikhail Elgin (Uzbekistan) Denis Istomin; 6–4, 6–2	(Germany) Andre Begemann (India) Leander Paes	(Bosnia and Herzegovina) Mirza Bašić (Slovakia) Lukáš Lacko	(Russia) Alexander Bublik (Uzbekistan) Sanjar Fayziev (Croatia) Ivan Dodig (France) Jérémy Chardy
October 10	Monterrey Challenger; Monterrey, Mexico; Hard – $100,000+H – 32S/32Q/16D; Singles – Doubles	(United States) Ernesto Escobedo; 6–4, 6–4	(United States) Denis Kudla	(Canada) Peter Polansky (Germany) Benjamin Becker	(Colombia) Alejandro Falla (El Salvador) Marcelo Arévalo (Australia) Sam Groth (Australia) John-Patrick Smith
October 10	Monterrey Challenger; Monterrey, Mexico; Hard – $100,000+H – 32S/32Q/16D; Singles – Doubles	(United States) Evan King (United States) Denis Kudla; 6–7^{(4–7)}, 6–4, [10–2]	(Australia) Jarryd Chaplin (New Zealand) Ben McLachlan	(Canada) Peter Polansky (Germany) Benjamin Becker	(Colombia) Alejandro Falla (El Salvador) Marcelo Arévalo (Australia) Sam Groth (Australia) John-Patrick Smith
October 10	Fairfield Challenger; Fairfield, United States; Hard – $100,000 – 32S/32Q/16D; Singles – Doubles	(Colombia) Santiago Giraldo; 4–6, 6–4, 6–2	(France) Quentin Halys	(United Kingdom) Brydan Klein (Belgium) Joris De Loore	(Germany) Maximilian Marterer (United States) Tommy Paul (Italy) Alessandro Giannessi (Slovenia) Grega Žemlja
October 10	Fairfield Challenger; Fairfield, United States; Hard – $100,000 – 32S/32Q/16D; Singles – Doubles	(United States) Brian Baker (United States) Mackenzie McDonald; 6–3, 6–4	(United States) Sekou Bangoura (United States) Eric Quigley	(United Kingdom) Brydan Klein (Belgium) Joris De Loore	(Germany) Maximilian Marterer (United States) Tommy Paul (Italy) Alessandro Giannessi (Slovenia) Grega Žemlja
October 10	Copa Fila; Buenos Aires, Argentina; Clay – $50,000+H – 32S/32Q/16D; Singles – Doubles	(Argentina) Renzo Olivo; 2–6, 7–6^{(7–3)}, 7–6^{(7–3)}	(Argentina) Leonardo Mayer	(Brazil) Rogério Dutra Silva (Dominican Republic) José Hernández	(Argentina) Horacio Zeballos (Brazil) Thiago Monteiro (Portugal) Pedro Sousa (Spain) Jaume Munar
October 10	Copa Fila; Buenos Aires, Argentina; Clay – $50,000+H – 32S/32Q/16D; Singles – Doubles	(Chile) Julio Peralta (Argentina) Horacio Zeballos; 7–6^{(7–5)}, 7–6^{(7–1)}	(Peru) Sergio Galdós (Brazil) Fernando Romboli	(Brazil) Rogério Dutra Silva (Dominican Republic) José Hernández	(Argentina) Horacio Zeballos (Brazil) Thiago Monteiro (Portugal) Pedro Sousa (Spain) Jaume Munar
October 10	Vietnam Open; Ho Chi Minh City, Vietnam; Hard – $50,000+H – 32S/32Q/16D; Singles – Doubles	(Australia) Jordan Thompson; 5–7, 7–5, 6–1	(Japan) Go Soeda	(Japan) Yasutaka Uchiyama (Switzerland) Henri Laaksonen	(Japan) Tatsuma Ito (Japan) Taro Daniel (Ukraine) Sergiy Stakhovsky (Germany) Peter Gojowczyk
October 10	Vietnam Open; Ho Chi Minh City, Vietnam; Hard – $50,000+H – 32S/32Q/16D; Singles – Doubles	(Thailand) Sanchai Ratiwatana (Thailand) Sonchat Ratiwatana; 7–5, 6–4	(India) Jeevan Nedunchezhiyan (India) Ramkumar Ramanathan	(Japan) Yasutaka Uchiyama (Switzerland) Henri Laaksonen	(Japan) Tatsuma Ito (Japan) Taro Daniel (Ukraine) Sergiy Stakhovsky (Germany) Peter Gojowczyk
October 10	Morocco Tennis Tour – Casablanca II; Casablanca, Morocco; Clay – €42,500 – 32S/32Q/15D; Singles – Doubles	(France) Maxime Janvier; 6–4, 6–0	(Greece) Stefanos Tsitsipas	(Poland) Kamil Majchrzak (Belgium) Arthur De Greef	(Italy) Gianluca Mager (Serbia) Laslo Đere (Spain) Bernabé Zapata Miralles (Serbia) Danilo Petrović
October 10	Morocco Tennis Tour – Casablanca II; Casablanca, Morocco; Clay – €42,500 – 32S/32Q/15D; Singles – Doubles	(Czech Republic) Roman Jebavý (Slovakia) Andrej Martin; 6–4, 6–2	(Croatia) Dino Marcan (Croatia) Antonio Šančić	(Poland) Kamil Majchrzak (Belgium) Arthur De Greef	(Italy) Gianluca Mager (Serbia) Laslo Đere (Spain) Bernabé Zapata Miralles (Serbia) Danilo Petrović
October 17	Brest Challenger; Brest, France; Hard (i) – €106,500+H – 32S/32Q/16D; Singles – Doubles	(Slovakia) Norbert Gombos; 7–5, 6–2	(Belgium) Yannik Reuter	(France) Jérémy Chardy (France) Julien Benneteau	(Canada) Steven Diez (Bosnia and Herzegovina) Aldin Šetkić (Serbia) Marko Tepavac (Slovakia) Lukáš Lacko
October 17	Brest Challenger; Brest, France; Hard (i) – €106,500+H – 32S/32Q/16D; Singles – Doubles	(Netherlands) Sander Arends (Poland) Mateusz Kowalczyk; 6–7^{(2–7)}, 6–3, [10–5]	(Switzerland) Marco Chiudinelli (Italy) Luca Vanni	(France) Jérémy Chardy (France) Julien Benneteau	(Canada) Steven Diez (Bosnia and Herzegovina) Aldin Šetkić (Serbia) Marko Tepavac (Slovakia) Lukáš Lacko
October 17	Ningbo Challenger; Ningbo, China; Hard – $125,000 – 32S/32Q/16D; Singles – Doubles	(Chinese Taipei) Lu Yen-hsun; 6–3, 6–1	(Japan) Hiroki Moriya	(Australia) John Millman (South Korea) Chung Hyeon	(Japan) Go Soeda (South Korea) Lee Duck-hee (South Korea) Kim Cheong-eui (United States) Stefan Kozlov
October 17	Ningbo Challenger; Ningbo, China; Hard – $125,000 – 32S/32Q/16D; Singles – Doubles	(France) Jonathan Eysseric (Ukraine) Sergiy Stakhovsky; 6–4, 7–6^{(7–4)}	(United States) Stefan Kozlov (Japan) Akira Santillan	(Australia) John Millman (South Korea) Chung Hyeon	(Japan) Go Soeda (South Korea) Lee Duck-hee (South Korea) Kim Cheong-eui (United States) Stefan Kozlov
October 17	Las Vegas Challenger; Las Vegas, United States; Hard – $50,000+H – 32S/32Q/16D; Singles – Doubles	(Australia) Sam Groth; 6–7^{(4–7)}, 6–4, 7–5	(Colombia) Santiago Giraldo	(Argentina) Marco Trungelliti (United States) Sekou Bangoura	(Slovenia) Grega Žemlja (Denmark) Mikael Torpegaard (United States) Tennys Sandgren (United Kingdom) Brydan Klein
October 17	Las Vegas Challenger; Las Vegas, United States; Hard – $50,000+H – 32S/32Q/16D; Singles – Doubles	(United States) Brian Baker (Australia) Matt Reid; 6–1, 7–5	(United States) Bjorn Fratangelo (United States) Denis Kudla	(Argentina) Marco Trungelliti (United States) Sekou Bangoura	(Slovenia) Grega Žemlja (Denmark) Mikael Torpegaard (United States) Tennys Sandgren (United Kingdom) Brydan Klein
October 17	Santiago Challenger; Santiago, Chile; Clay – $50,000+H – 32S/32Q/16D; Singles – Doubles	(Argentina) Máximo González; 6–2, 7–6^{(7–5)}	(Brazil) Rogério Dutra Silva	(Argentina) Horacio Zeballos (Brazil) Thiago Monteiro	(Portugal) Pedro Sousa (Norway) Casper Ruud (France) Mathias Bourgue (France) Axel Michon
October 17	Santiago Challenger; Santiago, Chile; Clay – $50,000+H – 32S/32Q/16D; Singles – Doubles	(Chile) Julio Peralta (Argentina) Horacio Zeballos; 6–3, 6–4	(Peru) Sergio Galdós (Argentina) Máximo González	(Argentina) Horacio Zeballos (Brazil) Thiago Monteiro	(Portugal) Pedro Sousa (Norway) Casper Ruud (France) Mathias Bourgue (France) Axel Michon
October 24	China International Suzhou; Suzhou, China; Hard – $75,000 – 32S/32Q/16D; Singles – Doubles	(Chinese Taipei) Lu Yen-hsun; 6–0, 6–1	(United States) Stefan Kozlov	(South Korea) Chung Hyeon (Russia) Alexander Kudryavtsev	(Italy) Andrea Arnaboldi (Spain) Pere Riba (Ukraine) Sergiy Stakhovsky (China) Wu Di
October 24	China International Suzhou; Suzhou, China; Hard – $75,000 – 32S/32Q/16D; Singles – Doubles	(Russia) Mikhail Elgin (Russia) Alexander Kudryavtsev; 4–6, 6–1, [10–7]	(Italy) Andrea Arnaboldi (France) Jonathan Eysseric	(South Korea) Chung Hyeon (Russia) Alexander Kudryavtsev	(Italy) Andrea Arnaboldi (Spain) Pere Riba (Ukraine) Sergiy Stakhovsky (China) Wu Di
October 24	WHB Hungarian Open; Budapest, Hungary; Hard (i) – €64,000+H – 32S/32Q/16D; Singles – Doubles	(Romania) Marius Copil; 6–4, 6–2	(Belgium) Steve Darcis	(Russia) Daniil Medvedev (France) Kenny de Schepper	(Spain) Tommy Robredo (Hungary) Márton Fucsovics (Uzbekistan) Denis Istomin (Slovakia) Lukáš Lacko
October 24	WHB Hungarian Open; Budapest, Hungary; Hard (i) – €64,000+H – 32S/32Q/16D; Singles – Doubles	(Belarus) Aliaksandr Bury (Sweden) Andreas Siljeström; 7–6^{(7–3)}, 6–4	(United States) James Cerretani (Austria) Philipp Oswald	(Russia) Daniil Medvedev (France) Kenny de Schepper	(Spain) Tommy Robredo (Hungary) Márton Fucsovics (Uzbekistan) Denis Istomin (Slovakia) Lukáš Lacko
October 24	Lima Challenger; Lima, Peru; Clay – $50,000+H – 32S/32Q/16D; Singles – Doubles	(Chile) Cristian Garín; 3–6, 7–5, 7–6^{(7–3)}	(Argentina) Guido Andreozzi	(Brazil) Rogério Dutra Silva (Brazil) Guilherme Clezar	(Argentina) Máximo González (Argentina) Leonardo Mayer (Argentina) Carlos Berlocq (Argentina) Facundo Bagnis
October 24	Lima Challenger; Lima, Peru; Clay – $50,000+H – 32S/32Q/16D; Singles – Doubles	(Peru) Sergio Galdós (Argentina) Leonardo Mayer; 6–2, 7–6^{(9–7)}	(Uruguay) Ariel Behar (Chile) Gonzalo Lama	(Brazil) Rogério Dutra Silva (Brazil) Guilherme Clezar	(Argentina) Máximo González (Argentina) Leonardo Mayer (Argentina) Carlos Berlocq (Argentina) Facundo Bagnis
October 24	KPIT MSLTA Challenger; Pune, India; Hard – $50,000 – 32S/32Q/16D; Singles – Doubles	(France) Sadio Doumbia; 4–6, 6–4, 6–3	(India) Prajnesh Gunneswaran	(Serbia) Nikola Milojević (South Korea) Lee Duck-hee	(Russia) Evgeny Donskoy (Spain) Adrián Menéndez Maceiras (India) Saketh Myneni (Kazakhstan) Dmitry Popko
October 24	KPIT MSLTA Challenger; Pune, India; Hard – $50,000 – 32S/32Q/16D; Singles – Doubles	(India) Purav Raja (India) Divij Sharan; 3–6, 6–3, [11–9]	(Switzerland) Luca Margaroli (France) Hugo Nys	(Serbia) Nikola Milojević (South Korea) Lee Duck-hee	(Russia) Evgeny Donskoy (Spain) Adrián Menéndez Maceiras (India) Saketh Myneni (Kazakhstan) Dmitry Popko
October 24	Latrobe City Traralgon ATP Challenger; Traralgon, Australia; Hard – $50,000 – 32S/32Q/16D; Singles – Doubles	(Australia) Jordan Thompson; 6–1, 6–2	(Slovenia) Grega Žemlja	(Argentina) Marco Trungelliti (Australia) Luke Saville	(Australia) Matthew Barton (Australia) Gavin van Peperzeel (Australia) James Duckworth (Australia) John-Patrick Smith
October 24	Latrobe City Traralgon ATP Challenger; Traralgon, Australia; Hard – $50,000 – 32S/32Q/16D; Singles – Doubles	(Australia) Matt Reid (Australia) John-Patrick Smith; 6–4, 6–4	(Australia) Matthew Barton (Australia) Matthew Ebden	(Argentina) Marco Trungelliti (Australia) Luke Saville	(Australia) Matthew Barton (Australia) Gavin van Peperzeel (Australia) James Duckworth (Australia) John-Patrick Smith
October 31	Challenger Ciudad de Guayaquil; Guayaquil, Ecuador; Clay – $50,000+H – 32S/32Q/16D; Singles – Doubles	(Argentina) Nicolás Kicker; 6–3, 6–2	(Belgium) Arthur De Greef	(Argentina) Guido Andreozzi (Brazil) João Pedro Sorgi	(France) Mathias Bourgue (Brazil) André Ghem (Argentina) Andrés Molteni (Argentina) Facundo Bagnis
October 31	Challenger Ciudad de Guayaquil; Guayaquil, Ecuador; Clay – $50,000+H – 32S/32Q/16D; Singles – Doubles	(Uruguay) Ariel Behar (Brazil) Fabiano de Paula; 6–2, 6–4	(El Salvador) Marcelo Arévalo (Peru) Sergio Galdós	(Argentina) Guido Andreozzi (Brazil) João Pedro Sorgi	(France) Mathias Bourgue (Brazil) André Ghem (Argentina) Andrés Molteni (Argentina) Facundo Bagnis
October 31	Charlottesville Men's Pro Challenger; Charlottesville, United States; Hard (i) – $50,000 – 32S/32Q/16D; Singles – Doubles	(United States) Reilly Opelka; 6–4, 2–6, 7–6^{(7–5)}	(Belgium) Ruben Bemelmans	(United States) Mackenzie McDonald (Switzerland) Henri Laaksonen	(Canada) Peter Polansky (United States) Denis Kudla (United States) Tim Smyczek (United States) Jared Donaldson
October 31	Charlottesville Men's Pro Challenger; Charlottesville, United States; Hard (i) – $50,000 – 32S/32Q/16D; Singles – Doubles	(United States) Brian Baker (Australia) Sam Groth; 6–3, 6–3	(United Kingdom) Brydan Klein (South Africa) Ruan Roelofse	(United States) Mackenzie McDonald (Switzerland) Henri Laaksonen	(Canada) Peter Polansky (United States) Denis Kudla (United States) Tim Smyczek (United States) Jared Donaldson
October 31	Canberra Tennis International; Canberra, Australia; Hard – $50,000 – 32S/32Q/16D; Singles – Doubles	(Australia) James Duckworth; 7–5, 6–3	(Australia) Marc Polmans	(Australia) Jordan Thompson (Australia) Omar Jasika	(Australia) John-Patrick Smith (Germany) Daniel Masur (Australia) Daniel Nolan (Australia) Greg Jones
October 31	Canberra Tennis International; Canberra, Australia; Hard – $50,000 – 32S/32Q/16D; Singles – Doubles	(Australia) Luke Saville (Australia) Jordan Thompson; 6–2, 6–3	(Australia) Matt Reid (Australia) John-Patrick Smith	(Australia) Jordan Thompson (Australia) Omar Jasika	(Australia) John-Patrick Smith (Germany) Daniel Masur (Australia) Daniel Nolan (Australia) Greg Jones
October 31	Bauer Watertechnology Cup; Eckental, Germany; Carpet (i) – €35,000+H – 32S/32Q/16D; Singles – Doubles	(Belgium) Steve Darcis; 6–4, 6–2	(Australia) Alex de Minaur	(Croatia) Franko Škugor (Germany) Kevin Krawietz	(Germany) Florian Mayer (Austria) Jürgen Melzer (Germany) Matthias Bachinger (Russia) Daniil Medvedev
October 31	Bauer Watertechnology Cup; Eckental, Germany; Carpet (i) – €35,000+H – 32S/32Q/16D; Singles – Doubles	(Germany) Kevin Krawietz (France) Albano Olivetti; 6–7^{(8–10)}, 6–4, [10–7]	(Czech Republic) Roman Jebavý (Slovakia) Andrej Martin	(Croatia) Franko Škugor (Germany) Kevin Krawietz	(Germany) Florian Mayer (Austria) Jürgen Melzer (Germany) Matthias Bachinger (Russia) Daniil Medvedev

=== November ===
Week of	Tournament	Champions	Runners-up	Semifinalists	Quarterfinalists
November 7	Slovak Open; Bratislava, Slovakia; Hard (i) – €85,000+H – 32S/32Q/16D; Singles – Doubles	(Slovakia) Norbert Gombos; 7–6^{(10–8)}, 4–6, 6–3	(Romania) Marius Copil	(Russia) Daniil Medvedev (Ukraine) Sergiy Stakhovsky	(Belarus) Egor Gerasimov (Czech Republic) Adam Pavlásek (Kazakhstan) Aleksandr Nedovyesov (Canada) Vasek Pospisil
November 7	Slovak Open; Bratislava, Slovakia; Hard (i) – €85,000+H – 32S/32Q/16D; Singles – Doubles	(United Kingdom) Ken Skupski (United Kingdom) Neal Skupski; 4–6, 6–3, [10–5]	(India) Purav Raja (India) Divij Sharan	(Russia) Daniil Medvedev (Ukraine) Sergiy Stakhovsky	(Belarus) Egor Gerasimov (Czech Republic) Adam Pavlásek (Kazakhstan) Aleksandr Nedovyesov (Canada) Vasek Pospisil
November 7	Internationaux de Tennis de Vendée; Mouilleron-le-Captif, France; Hard (i) – €85,000+H – 32S/32Q/14D; Singles – Doubles	(France) Julien Benneteau; 7–5, 2–6, 6–3	(Russia) Andrey Rublev	(France) Benoît Paire (Germany) Peter Gojowczyk	(France) Édouard Roger-Vasselin (France) Tristan Lamasine (Australia) Alex de Minaur (Russia) Alexey Vatutin
November 7	Internationaux de Tennis de Vendée; Mouilleron-le-Captif, France; Hard (i) – €85,000+H – 32S/32Q/14D; Singles – Doubles	(France) Jonathan Eysseric (France) Édouard Roger-Vasselin; 6–7^{(1–7)}, 7–6^{(7–3)}, [11–9]	(Sweden) Johan Brunström (Sweden) Andreas Siljeström	(France) Benoît Paire (Germany) Peter Gojowczyk	(France) Édouard Roger-Vasselin (France) Tristan Lamasine (Australia) Alex de Minaur (Russia) Alexey Vatutin
November 7	Open Bogotá; Bogotá, Colombia; Clay – $75,000+H – 32S/32Q/16D; Singles – Doubles	(Argentina) Facundo Bagnis; 3–6, 6–3, 7–6^{(7–4)}	(Argentina) Horacio Zeballos	(Spain) Íñigo Cervantes (Colombia) Santiago Giraldo	(Colombia) Alejandro Gómez (Colombia) Daniel Elahi Galán (Brazil) André Ghem (El Salvador) Marcelo Arévalo
November 7	Open Bogotá; Bogotá, Colombia; Clay – $75,000+H – 32S/32Q/16D; Singles – Doubles	(El Salvador) Marcelo Arévalo (Peru) Sergio Galdós; 6–4, 6–1	(Uruguay) Ariel Behar (Ecuador) Gonzalo Escobar	(Spain) Íñigo Cervantes (Colombia) Santiago Giraldo	(Colombia) Alejandro Gómez (Colombia) Daniel Elahi Galán (Brazil) André Ghem (El Salvador) Marcelo Arévalo
November 7	Sparkassen ATP Challenger; Ortisei, Italy; Hard (i) – €64,000 – 32S/32Q/16D; Singles – Doubles	(Italy) Stefano Napolitano; 6–4, 6–1	(Italy) Alessandro Giannessi	(Italy) Lorenzo Sonego (Germany) Kevin Krawietz	(Italy) Federico Gaio (Italy) Salvatore Caruso (Bosnia and Herzegovina) Mirza Bašić (Slovenia) Blaž Kavčič
November 7	Sparkassen ATP Challenger; Ortisei, Italy; Hard (i) – €64,000 – 32S/32Q/16D; Singles – Doubles	(Germany) Kevin Krawietz (France) Albano Olivetti; 6–4, 6–4	(Canada) Frank Dancevic (Serbia) Marko Tepavac	(Italy) Lorenzo Sonego (Germany) Kevin Krawietz	(Italy) Federico Gaio (Italy) Salvatore Caruso (Bosnia and Herzegovina) Mirza Bašić (Slovenia) Blaž Kavčič
November 7	Kobe Challenger; Kobe, Japan; Hard (i) – $50,000+H – 32S/32Q/16D; Singles – Doubles	(South Korea) Chung Hyeon; 6–4, 7–6^{(7–2)}	(Australia) James Duckworth	(South Korea) Lee Duck-hee (Japan) Go Soeda	(Japan) Yasutaka Uchiyama (France) Laurent Lokoli (Israel) Amir Weintraub (Japan) Yoshihito Nishioka
November 7	Kobe Challenger; Kobe, Japan; Hard (i) – $50,000+H – 32S/32Q/16D; Singles – Doubles	(Germany) Daniel Masur (Croatia) Ante Pavić; 4–6, 6–3, [10–6]	(India) Jeevan Nedunchezhiyan (Indonesia) Christopher Rungkat	(South Korea) Lee Duck-hee (Japan) Go Soeda	(Japan) Yasutaka Uchiyama (France) Laurent Lokoli (Israel) Amir Weintraub (Japan) Yoshihito Nishioka
November 7	Knoxville Challenger; Knoxville, United States; Hard (i) – $50,000 – 32S/32Q/16D; Singles – Doubles	(United States) Michael Mmoh; 7–5, 2–6, 6–1	(Canada) Peter Polansky	(United States) Jared Donaldson (United States) Stefan Kozlov	(United States) Mackenzie McDonald (Belgium) Ruben Bemelmans (United Kingdom) Edward Corrie (United States) Austin Krajicek
November 7	Knoxville Challenger; Knoxville, United States; Hard (i) – $50,000 – 32S/32Q/16D; Singles – Doubles	(Canada) Peter Polansky (Canada) Adil Shamasdin; 6–1, 6–3	(Belgium) Ruben Bemelmans (Belgium) Joris De Loore	(United States) Jared Donaldson (United States) Stefan Kozlov	(United States) Mackenzie McDonald (Belgium) Ruben Bemelmans (United Kingdom) Edward Corrie (United States) Austin Krajicek
November 14	Uruguay Open; Montevideo, Uruguay; Clay – $50,000+H – 32S/32Q/16D; Singles – Doubles	(Argentina) Diego Schwartzman; 6–4, 6–1	(Brazil) Rogério Dutra Silva	(Chile) Cristian Garín (Argentina) Carlos Berlocq	(Spain) Nicolás Almagro (Argentina) Horacio Zeballos (Spain) Íñigo Cervantes (Argentina) Nicolás Kicker
November 14	Uruguay Open; Montevideo, Uruguay; Clay – $50,000+H – 32S/32Q/16D; Singles – Doubles	(Argentina) Andrés Molteni (Argentina) Diego Schwartzman; Walkover	(Brazil) Fabiano de Paula (Chile) Cristian Garín	(Chile) Cristian Garín (Argentina) Carlos Berlocq	(Spain) Nicolás Almagro (Argentina) Horacio Zeballos (Spain) Íñigo Cervantes (Argentina) Nicolás Kicker
November 14	JSM Challenger of Champaign–Urbana; Champaign, United States; Hard (i) – $50,000 – 32S/32Q/16D; Singles – Doubles	(Switzerland) Henri Laaksonen; 7–5, 6–3	(Belgium) Ruben Bemelmans	(United States) Jared Donaldson (United States) Christopher Eubanks	(United States) Bradley Klahn (United States) Brian Baker (United States) Michael Mmoh (United States) Marcos Giron
November 14	JSM Challenger of Champaign–Urbana; Champaign, United States; Hard (i) – $50,000 – 32S/32Q/16D; Singles – Doubles	(United States) Austin Krajicek (United States) Tennys Sandgren; 7–6^{(7–4)}, 7–6^{(7–2)}	(United Kingdom) Luke Bambridge (United Kingdom) Liam Broady	(United States) Jared Donaldson (United States) Christopher Eubanks	(United States) Bradley Klahn (United States) Brian Baker (United States) Michael Mmoh (United States) Marcos Giron
November 14	Trofeo Città di Brescia; Brescia, Italy; Carpet (i) – €42,500+H – 32S/32Q/16D; Singles – Doubles	(Italy) Luca Vanni; 6–7^{(5–7)}, 6–4, 7–6^{(10–8)}	(Lithuania) Laurynas Grigelis	(Slovakia) Lukáš Lacko (Italy) Salvatore Caruso	(Canada) Frank Dancevic (Spain) Tommy Robredo (Czech Republic) Zdeněk Kolář (Belarus) Egor Gerasimov
November 14	Trofeo Città di Brescia; Brescia, Italy; Carpet (i) – €42,500+H – 32S/32Q/16D; Singles – Doubles	(Russia) Mikhail Elgin (Russia) Alexander Kudryavtsev; 7–6^{(7–4)}, 6–3	(Netherlands) Wesley Koolhof (Netherlands) Matwé Middelkoop	(Slovakia) Lukáš Lacko (Italy) Salvatore Caruso	(Canada) Frank Dancevic (Spain) Tommy Robredo (Czech Republic) Zdeněk Kolář (Belarus) Egor Gerasimov
November 14	Dunlop World Challenge; Toyota, Japan; Carpet (i) – $50,000+H – 32S/32Q/16D; Singles – Doubles	(Australia) James Duckworth; 7–5, 4–6, 6–1	(Japan) Tatsuma Ito	(Germany) Daniel Masur (Australia) Luke Saville	(Japan) Yoshihito Nishioka (Japan) Yusuke Takahashi (South Korea) Lim Yong-kyu (Belarus) Yaraslav Shyla
November 14	Dunlop World Challenge; Toyota, Japan; Carpet (i) – $50,000+H – 32S/32Q/16D; Singles – Doubles	(Australia) Matt Reid (Australia) John-Patrick Smith; 6–3, 6–4	(India) Jeevan Nedunchezhiyan (Indonesia) Christopher Rungkat	(Germany) Daniel Masur (Australia) Luke Saville	(Japan) Yoshihito Nishioka (Japan) Yusuke Takahashi (South Korea) Lim Yong-kyu (Belarus) Yaraslav Shyla
November 21	Columbus Challenger 2 Columbus, United States; Hard (i) – $75,000 – 32S/32Q/16D; Singles – Doubles	(United States) Stefan Kozlov; 6–1, 2–6, 6–2	(United States) Tennys Sandgren	(Republic of Ireland) Sam Barry (Switzerland) Henri Laaksonen	(United States) Taylor Fritz (United States) Kevin King (United States) Peter Kobelt (United Kingdom) Cameron Norrie
November 21	Columbus Challenger 2 Columbus, United States; Hard (i) – $75,000 – 32S/32Q/16D; Singles – Doubles	(Republic of Ireland) David O'Hare (United Kingdom) Joe Salisbury; 6–3, 6–4	(United Kingdom) Luke Bambridge (United Kingdom) Cameron Norrie	(Republic of Ireland) Sam Barry (Switzerland) Henri Laaksonen	(United States) Taylor Fritz (United States) Kevin King (United States) Peter Kobelt (United Kingdom) Cameron Norrie
November 21	Internazionali di Tennis Castel del Monte; Andria, Italy; Carpet (i) – €42,500+H – 32S/32Q/16D; Singles – Doubles	(Italy) Luca Vanni; 5–7, 6–0, 6–3	(Italy) Matteo Berrettini	(Ukraine) Sergiy Stakhovsky (Belarus) Egor Gerasimov	(Italy) Stefano Travaglia (Bosnia and Herzegovina) Aldin Šetkić (Greece) Stefanos Tsitsipas (Spain) Tommy Robredo
November 21	Internazionali di Tennis Castel del Monte; Andria, Italy; Carpet (i) – €42,500+H – 32S/32Q/16D; Singles – Doubles	(Netherlands) Wesley Koolhof (Netherlands) Matwé Middelkoop; 6–3, 6–3	(Czech Republic) Roman Jebavý (Czech Republic) Zdeněk Kolář	(Ukraine) Sergiy Stakhovsky (Belarus) Egor Gerasimov	(Italy) Stefano Travaglia (Bosnia and Herzegovina) Aldin Šetkić (Greece) Stefanos Tsitsipas (Spain) Tommy Robredo
November 21	Astana Challenger Capital Cup; Astana, Kazakhstan; Hard (i) – $50,000+H – 32S/32Q/16D; Singles – Doubles	(Japan) Yoshihito Nishioka; 6–4, 6–7^{(4–7)}, 7–6^{(7–3)}	(Uzbekistan) Denis Istomin	(Kazakhstan) Aleksandr Nedovyesov (Uzbekistan) Temur Ismailov	(Kazakhstan) Dmitry Popko (India) Prajnesh Gunneswaran (Russia) Alexander Bublik (Serbia) Nikola Milojević
November 21	Astana Challenger Capital Cup; Astana, Kazakhstan; Hard (i) – $50,000+H – 32S/32Q/16D; Singles – Doubles	(Kazakhstan) Timur Khabibulin (Kazakhstan) Aleksandr Nedovyesov; 7–6^{(9–7)}, 6–2	(Russia) Mikhail Elgin (Uzbekistan) Denis Istomin	(Kazakhstan) Aleksandr Nedovyesov (Uzbekistan) Temur Ismailov	(Kazakhstan) Dmitry Popko (India) Prajnesh Gunneswaran (Russia) Alexander Bublik (Serbia) Nikola Milojević

== Statistical information ==
These tables present the number of singles (S) and doubles (D) titles won by each player and each nation during the season. The players/nations are sorted by: 1) total number of titles (a doubles title won by two players representing the same nation counts as only one win for the nation); 2) a singles > doubles hierarchy; 3) alphabetical order (by family names for players).

To avoid confusion and double counting, these tables should be updated only after an event is completed.

=== Titles won by player ===
Total	Player	S	D	S	D
8	Jordan Thompson (AUS)	● ● ● ●	● ● ● ●	4	4
7	Facundo Bagnis (ARG)	● ● ● ● ● ●	●	6	1
6	Horacio Zeballos (ARG)	● ●	● ● ● ●	2	4
6	Julio Peralta (CHI)		● ● ● ● ● ●	0	6
6	Matt Reid (AUS)		● ● ● ● ● ●	0	6
6	John-Patrick Smith (AUS)		● ● ● ● ● ●	0	6
5	Brian Baker (USA)		● ● ● ● ●	0	5
5	Aliaksandr Bury (BLR)		● ● ● ● ●	0	5
5	James Cerretani (USA)		● ● ● ● ●	0	5
5	Albano Olivetti (FRA)		● ● ● ● ●	0	5
5	Andreas Siljeström (SWE)		● ● ● ● ●	0	5
4	Lu Yen-hsun (TPE)	● ● ● ●		4	0
4	Gerald Melzer (AUT)	● ● ● ●		4	0
4	Federico Gaio (ITA)	● ●	● ●	2	2
4	Andrey Golubev (KAZ)	●	● ● ●	1	3
4	Máximo González (ARG)	●	● ● ●	1	3
4	Sam Groth (AUS)	●	● ● ●	1	3
4	Peter Polansky (CAN)	●	● ● ●	1	3
4	Johan Brunström (SWE)		● ● ● ●	0	4
4	Mikhail Elgin (RUS)		● ● ● ●	0	4
4	Wesley Koolhof (NED)		● ● ● ●	0	4
4	Kevin Krawietz (GER)		● ● ● ●	0	4
4	Nikola Mektić (CRO)		● ● ● ●	0	4
4	Matwé Middelkoop (NED)		● ● ● ●	0	4
4	Philipp Oswald (AUT)		● ● ● ●	0	4
4	Purav Raja (IND)		● ● ● ●	0	4
4	Luke Saville (AUS)		● ● ● ●	0	4
4	Divij Sharan (IND)		● ● ● ●	0	4
4	Ken Skupski (GBR)		● ● ● ●	0	4
4	Neal Skupski (GBR)		● ● ● ●	0	4
3	Radu Albot (MDA)	● ● ●		3	0
3	Steve Darcis (BEL)	● ● ●		3	0
3	James Duckworth (AUS)	● ● ●		3	0
3	Daniel Evans (GBR)	● ● ●		3	0
3	Malek Jaziri (TUN)	● ● ●		3	0
3	Darian King (BAR)	● ● ●		3	0
3	Luca Vanni (ITA)	● ● ●		3	0
3	Mikhail Youzhny (RUS)	● ● ●		3	0
3	Guido Andreozzi (ARG)	● ●	●	2	1
3	Gastão Elias (POR)	● ●	●	2	1
3	Robin Haase (NED)	● ●	●	2	1
3	Pierre-Hugues Herbert (FRA)	● ●	●	2	1
3	Nicolás Kicker (ARG)	● ●	●	2	1
3	Konstantin Kravchuk (RUS)	● ●	●	2	1
3	Maximilian Marterer (GER)	● ●	●	2	1
3	Jan Šátral (CZE)	● ●	●	2	1
3	Diego Schwartzman (ARG)	● ●	●	2	1
3	Jan-Lennard Struff (GER)	● ●	●	2	1
3	Jason Jung (TPE)	●	● ●	1	2
3	Stefano Napolitano (ITA)	●	● ●	1	2
3	Eduardo Struvay (COL)	●	● ●	1	2
3	Sander Arends (NED)		● ● ●	0	3
3	Facundo Argüello (ARG)		● ● ●	0	3
3	Andre Begemann (GER)		● ● ●	0	3
3	Ariel Behar (URU)		● ● ●	0	3
3	Jonathan Eysseric (FRA)		● ● ●	0	3
3	Sergio Galdós (PER)		● ● ●	0	3
3	Gong Maoxin (CHN)		● ● ●	0	3
3	Hsieh Cheng-peng (TPE)		● ● ●	0	3
3	Roman Jebavý (CZE)		● ● ●	0	3
3	Alexander Kudryavtsev (RUS)		● ● ●	0	3
3	Tristan Lamasine (FRA)		● ● ●	0	3
3	Andrej Martin (SVK)		● ● ●	0	3
3	Andrés Molteni (ARG)		● ● ●	0	3
3	Fabrício Neis (BRA)		● ● ●	0	3
3	Dennis Novikov (USA)		● ● ●	0	3
3	Hans Podlipnik (CHI)		● ● ●	0	3
3	Sanchai Ratiwatana (THA)		● ● ●	0	3
3	Sonchat Ratiwatana (THA)		● ● ●	0	3
3	Alexander Satschko (GER)		● ● ●	0	3
3	Max Schnur (USA)		● ● ●	0	3
3	Andrei Vasilevski (BLR)		● ● ●	0	3
3	Yi Chu-huan (TPE)		● ● ●	0	3
3	Igor Zelenay (SVK)		● ● ●	0	3
2	Nikoloz Basilashvili (GEO)	● ●		2	0
2	Ričardas Berankis (LTU)	● ●		2	0
2	Chung Hyeon (KOR)	● ●		2	0
2	Evgeny Donskoy (RUS)	● ●		2	0
2	Kyle Edmund (GBR)	● ●		2	0
2	Ernesto Escobedo (USA)	● ●		2	0
2	Santiago Giraldo (COL)	● ●		2	0
2	Norbert Gombos (SVK)	● ●		2	0
2	Mikhail Kukushkin (KAZ)	● ●		2	0
2	Henri Laaksonen (SUI)	● ●		2	0
2	Paolo Lorenzi (ITA)	● ●		2	0
2	Florian Mayer (GER)	● ●		2	0
2	Yoshihito Nishioka (JPN)	● ●		2	0
2	Renzo Olivo (ARG)	● ●		2	0
2	Adam Pavlásek (CZE)	● ●		2	0
2	João Souza (BRA)	● ●		2	0
2	Frances Tiafoe (USA)	● ●		2	0
2	Julien Benneteau (FRA)	●	●	1	1
2	Marco Chiudinelli (SUI)	●	●	1	1
2	Marius Copil (ROU)	●	●	1	1
2	Sadio Doumbia (FRA)	●	●	1	1
2	Rogério Dutra Silva (BRA)	●	●	1	1
2	Stefan Kozlov (USA)	●	●	1	1
2	Leonardo Mayer (ARG)	●	●	1	1
2	Sergiy Stakhovsky (UKR)	●	●	1	1
2	Wu Di (CHN)	●	●	1	1
2	Isak Arvidsson (SWE)		● ●	0	2
2	Bai Yan (CHN)		● ●	0	2
2	Philip Bester (CAN)		● ●	0	2
2	Marcus Daniell (NZL)		● ●	0	2
2	Alejandro Falla (COL)		● ●	0	2
2	Riccardo Ghedin (ITA)		● ●	0	2
2	André Ghem (BRA)		● ●	0	2
2	Santiago González (MEX)		● ●	0	2
2	Julian Knowle (AUT)		● ●	0	2
2	Gero Kretschmer (GER)		● ●	0	2
2	Luca Margaroli (SUI)		● ●	0	2
2	Daniel Masur (GER)		● ●	0	2
2	Roberto Maytín (VEN)		● ●	0	2
2	Denys Molchanov (UKR)		● ●	0	2
2	Jeevan Nedunchezhiyan (IND)		● ●	0	2
2	Leander Paes (IND)		● ●	0	2
2	Édouard Roger-Vasselin (FRA)		● ●	0	2
2	Antonio Šančić (CRO)		● ●	0	2
2	Fred Simonsson (SWE)		● ●	0	2
2	Artem Sitak (NZL)		● ●	0	2
2	Franko Škugor (CRO)		● ●	0	2
2	Tristan-Samuel Weissborn (AUT)		● ●	0	2
2	Yang Tsung-hua (TPE)		● ●	0	2
2	Caio Zampieri (BRA)		● ●	0	2
1	Thomaz Bellucci (BRA)	●		1	0
1	Carlos Berlocq (ARG)	●		1	0
1	Michael Berrer (GER)	●		1	0
1	Dustin Brown (GER)	●		1	0
1	Marco Cecchinato (ITA)	●		1	0
1	Kimmer Coppejans (BEL)	●		1	0
1	Taro Daniel (JPN)	●		1	0
1	Arthur De Greef (BEL)	●		1	0
1	Kenny de Schepper (FRA)	●		1	0
1	Thomas Fabbiano (ITA)	●		1	0
1	Bjorn Fratangelo (USA)	●		1	0
1	Taylor Fritz (USA)	●		1	0
1	Christian Garin (CHI)	●		1	0
1	Alessandro Giannessi (ITA)	●		1	0
1	Marcel Granollers (ESP)	●		1	0
1	Quentin Halys (FRA)	●		1	0
1	Marsel İlhan (TUR)	●		1	0
1	Jerzy Janowicz (POL)	●		1	0
1	Maxime Janvier (FRA)	●		1	0
1	Tobias Kamke (GER)	●		1	0
1	Blaž Kavčič (SLO)	●		1	0
1	Karen Khachanov (RUS)	●		1	0
1	Jozef Kovalík (SVK)	●		1	0
1	Peđa Krstin (SRB)	●		1	0
1	Gonzalo Lama (CHI)	●		1	0
1	Constant Lestienne (FRA)	●		1	0
1	Adrian Mannarino (FRA)	●		1	0
1	Illya Marchenko (UKR)	●		1	0
1	James McGee (IRL)	●		1	0
1	Daniil Medvedev (RUS)	●		1	0
1	Michael Mmoh (USA)	●		1	0
1	Thiago Monteiro (BRA)	●		1	0
1	Hiroki Moriya (JPN)	●		1	0
1	Blake Mott (AUS)	●		1	0
1	Reilly Opelka (USA)	●		1	0
1	Max Purcell (AUS)	●		1	0
1	Stéphane Robert (FRA)	●		1	0
1	Andrey Rublev (RUS)	●		1	0
1	Casper Ruud (NOR)	●		1	0
1	Dudi Sela (ISR)	●		1	0
1	Alexandre Sidorenko (FRA)	●		1	0
1	Go Soeda (JPN)	●		1	0
1	Yūichi Sugita (JPN)	●		1	0
1	Marko Tepavac (SRB)	●		1	0
1	Janko Tipsarević (SRB)	●		1	0
1	Mikael Torpegaard (DEN)	●		1	0
1	Agustín Velotti (ARG)	●		1	0
1	Elias Ymer (SWE)	●		1	0
1	Miljan Zekić (SRB)	●		1	0
1	Mischa Zverev (GER)	●		1	0
1	Marcelo Arévalo (ESA)		●	0	1
1	Grégoire Barrère (FRA)		●	0	1
1	Tomasz Bednarek (POL)		●	0	1
1	Sergey Betov (BLR)		●	0	1
1	Yuki Bhambri (IND)		●	0	1
1	Mahesh Bhupathi (IND)		●	0	1
1	Íñigo Cervantes (ESP)		●	0	1
1	Chen Ti (TPE)		●	0	1
1	Guilherme Clezar (BRA)		●	0	1
1	Federico Coria (ARG)		●	0	1
1	Marcelo Demoliner (BRA)		●	0	1
1	Fabiano de Paula (BRA)		●	0	1
1	Matteo Donati (ITA)		●	0	1
1	Mariusz Fyrstenberg (POL)		●	0	1
1	Sander Gillé (BEL)		●	0	1
1	Alejandro González (COL)		●	0	1
1	Ryan Harrison (USA)		●	0	1
1	Calvin Hemery (FRA)		●	0	1
1	José Hernández (DOM)		●	0	1
1	Denis Istomin (UZB)		●	0	1
1	Ilya Ivashka (BLR)		●	0	1
1	Yannick Jankovits (FRA)		●	0	1
1	Nicolás Jarry (CHI)		●	0	1
1	Rameez Junaid (AUS)		●	0	1
1	Timur Khabibulin (KAZ)		●	0	1
1	Evan King (USA)		●	0	1
1	Mateusz Kowalczyk (POL)		●	0	1
1	Austin Krajicek (USA)		●	0	1
1	Mitchell Krueger (USA)		●	0	1
1	Denis Kudla (USA)		●	0	1
1	Giovanni Lapentti (ECU)		●	0	1
1	Li Zhe (CHN)		●	0	1
1	Miķelis Lībietis (LAT)		●	0	1
1	Tomás Lipovšek Puches (ARG)		●	0	1
1	Enrique López Pérez (ESP)		●	0	1
1	Oliver Marach (AUT)		●	0	1
1	Dino Marcan (CRO)		●	0	1
1	Denis Matsukevich (RUS)		●	0	1
1	Mackenzie McDonald (USA)		●	0	1
1	Nicolas Meister (USA)		●	0	1
1	Jürgen Melzer (AUT)		●	0	1
1	Aleksandre Metreveli (GEO)		●	0	1
1	Nicholas Monroe (USA)		●	0	1
1	Alessandro Motti (ITA)		●	0	1
1	Saketh Myneni (IND)		●	0	1
1	Aleksandr Nedovyesov (KAZ)		●	0	1
1	Daniel Nguyen (USA)		●	0	1
1	Frederik Nielsen (DEN)		●	0	1
1	David O'Hare (IRL)		●	0	1
1	Ante Pavić (CRO)		●	0	1
1	Mate Pavić (CRO)		●	0	1
1	Peng Hsien-yin (TPE)		●	0	1
1	David Pérez Sanz (ESP)		●	0	1
1	Danilo Petrović (SRB)		●	0	1
1	Tim Pütz (GER)		●	0	1
1	Eric Quigley (USA)		●	0	1
1	Aisam-ul-Haq Qureshi (PAK)		●	0	1
1	Rubén Ramírez Hidalgo (ESP)		●	0	1
1	Miguel Ángel Reyes-Varela (MEX)		●	0	1
1	Pere Riba (ESP)		●	0	1
1	Oriol Roca Batalla (ESP)		●	0	1
1	Mohamed Safwat (EGY)		●	0	1
1	Joe Salisbury (GBR)		●	0	1
1	Tennys Sandgren (USA)		●	0	1
1	Nicolaas Scholtz (RSA)		●	0	1
1	Adil Shamasdin (CAN)		●	0	1
1	Yaraslav Shyla (BLR)		●	0	1
1	Simon Stadler (GER)		●	0	1
1	Wishaya Trongcharoenchaikul (THA)		●	0	1
1	Antal van der Duim (NED)		●	0	1
1	Joran Vliegen (BEL)		●	0	1
1	Tucker Vorster (RSA)		●	0	1
1	Kittipong Wachiramanowong (THA)		●	0	1
1	Tak Khunn Wang (FRA)		●	0	1
1	Zhang Ze (CHN)		●	0	1
1	Zhang Zhizhen (CHN)		●	0	1

=== Titles won by nation ===
Total	Nation	S	D
34	Argentina (ARG)	20	14
30	United States (USA)	9	21
25	France (FRA)	11	14
25	Australia (AUS)	10	15
23	Germany (GER)	10	13
17	Russia (RUS)	10	7
16	Italy (ITA)	11	5
13	Brazil (BRA)	5	8
13	Chinese Taipei (TPE)	5	8
12	Austria (AUT)	4	8
11	Netherlands (NED)	2	9
10	Great Britain (GBR)	5	5
10	Chile (CHI)	2	8
9	Slovakia (SVK)	3	6
9	Sweden (SWE)	1	8
9	Belarus (BLR)	0	9
9	India (IND)	0	9
8	Croatia (CRO)	0	8
7	Czech Republic (CZE)	4	3
7	Kazakhstan (KAZ)	3	4
7	China (CHN)	1	6
6	Japan (JPN)	6	0
6	Belgium (BEL)	5	1
6	Colombia (COL)	3	3
6	Switzerland (SUI)	3	3
5	Serbia (SRB)	4	1
5	Ukraine (UKR)	2	3
5	Spain (ESP)	1	4
4	Canada (CAN)	1	3
4	Poland (POL)	1	3
4	Thailand (THA)	0	4
3	Barbados (BAR)	3	0
3	Moldova (MDA)	3	0
3	Tunisia (TUN)	3	0
3	Georgia (GEO)	2	1
3	Portugal (POR)	2	1
3	Mexico (MEX)	0	3
3	Peru (PER)	0	3
3	Uruguay (URU)	0	3
2	Lithuania (LTU)	2	0
2	South Korea (KOR)	2	0
2	Denmark (DEN)	1	1
2	Ireland (IRL)	1	1
2	Romania (ROU)	1	1
2	New Zealand (NZL)	0	2
2	Venezuela (VEN)	0	2
1	Israel (ISR)	1	0
1	Norway (NOR)	1	0
1	Slovenia (SLO)	1	0
1	Turkey (TUR)	1	0
1	Dominican Republic (DOM)	0	1
1	Ecuador (ECU)	0	1
1	Egypt (EGY)	0	1
1	El Salvador (ESA)	0	1
1	Latvia (LAT)	0	1
1	Pakistan (PAK)	0	1
1	South Africa (RSA)	0	1
1	Uzbekistan (UZB)	0	1

== Point distribution ==
Points are awarded as follows:

Category		W	F	SF	QF	R16	R32	Q	Q3	Q2	Q1
Challenger $125,000+H; Challenger €106,500+H	S	125	75	45	25	10	0	+5	0	0	0
Challenger $125,000+H; Challenger €106,500+H	D	125	75	45	25	0	–	–	–	–	–
Challenger $125,000 or $100,000+H; Challenger €106,500 or €85,000+H	S	110	65	40	20	9	0	+5	0	0	0
Challenger $125,000 or $100,000+H; Challenger €106,500 or €85,000+H	D	110	65	40	20	0	–	–	–	–	–
Challenger $100,000 or $75,000+H; Challenger €85,000 or €64,000+H	S	100	60	35	18	8	0	+5	0	0	0
Challenger $100,000 or $75,000+H; Challenger €85,000 or €64,000+H	D	100	60	35	18	0	–	–	–	–	–
Challenger $75,000 or $50,000+H; Challenger €64,000 or €42,500+H	S	90	55	33	17	8	0	+5	0	0	0
Challenger $75,000 or $50,000+H; Challenger €64,000 or €42,500+H	D	90	55	33	17	0	–	–	–	–	–
Challenger $50,000; Challenger €42,500	S	80	48	29	15	7	0	+3	0	0	0
Challenger $50,000; Challenger €42,500	D	80	48	29	15	0	–	–	–	–	–
Challenger $40,000+H; Challenger €35,000+H	S	80	48	29	15	6	0	+3	0	0	0
Challenger $40,000+H; Challenger €35,000+H	D	80	48	29	15	0	–	–	–	–	–
