= 2017 Nordic Naturals Challenger – Singles =

Singles
- 2017 Nordic Naturals Challenger

Final
- Champion: (Kazakhstan) Alexander Bublik
- Runner-up: (United Kingdom) Liam Broady
- Score: 6–2, 6–3

Events
Singles	Doubles
← 2016 ·	Nordic Naturals Challenger	· 2018 →

Dan Evans was the defending champion, but did not play to defend his title.

Alexander Bublik won the title after defeating Liam Broady 6–2, 6–3 in the final.

== Seeds ==
1. (Tunisia) Malek Jaziri (first round)
2. (Australia) Jordan Thompson (first round)
3. (Switzerland) Henri Laaksonen (second round)
4. (Belgium) Ruben Bemelmans (first round)
5. (Kazakhstan) Mikhail Kukushkin (second round)
6. (United States) Tennys Sandgren (quarterfinals)
7. (Norway) Casper Ruud (first round)
8. (United States) Bjorn Fratangelo (first round)

== Draw ==
=== Key ===
- Q = Qualifier
- WC = Wild card
- LL = Lucky loser
- Alt = Alternate
- SE = Special exempt
- PR = Protected ranking
- ITF = ITF entry
- JE = Junior exempt
- w/o = Walkover
- r = Retired
- d = Defaulted
- SR = Special ranking

=== Finals ===
Semifinals
WC	(United States) Taylor Fritz	6^{3}	3
Q	(United Kingdom) Liam Broady	7^{7}	6
(Kazakhstan) Alexander Bublik	7^{7}	6
(Australia) Sam Groth	6^{2}	3

Final
Q	(United Kingdom) Liam Broady	2	3
(Kazakhstan) Alexander Bublik	6	6

=== Top half ===
First round
1	(Tunisia) M Jaziri	2	1
Q	(United States) A Krajicek	6	6
WC	(United States) T Fritz	6	6
(Russia) K Kravchuk	3	4
WC	(United States) M McDonald	6^{3}	6	6
(Australia) J Millman	7^{7}	4	0
Q	(Denmark) F Nielsen	2	4
6	(United States) T Sandgren	6	6
4	(Belgium) R Bemelmans	6	4	2
Q	(United Kingdom) L Broady	3	6	6
Alt	(Belgium) J De Loore	6	6
WC	(United States) John Lamble	3	1
(United States) N Rubin	6^{5}	2
SE	(United States) R Sarmiento	7^{7}	6
(France) Q Halys	6	3	6
7	(Norway) C Ruud	4	6	3

Second round
Q	(United States) A Krajicek	6	1	2
WC	(United States) T Fritz	2	6	6
WC	(United States) M McDonald	1	2
6	(United States) T Sandgren	6	6
Q	(United Kingdom) L Broady	6	6
Alt	(Belgium) J De Loore	2	2
SE	(United States) R Sarmiento	6	4	6
(France) Q Halys	4	6	3

Quarterfinals
WC	(United States) T Fritz	7	7^{7}
6	(United States) T Sandgren	5	6^{1}
Q	(United Kingdom) L Broady	6	6
SE	(United States) R Sarmiento	4	4

Semifinals
WC	(United States) T Fritz	6^{3}	3
Q	(United Kingdom) L Broady	7^{7}	6

=== Bottom half ===
First round
5	(Kazakhstan) M Kukushkin	6	6
(Russia) T Gabashvili	4	4
(France) G Sakharov	4	4
WC	(United States) D Novikov	6	6
(Kazakhstan) A Bublik	6	2	6
(United States) M Krueger	3	6	4
(India) R Ramanathan	3	2
3	(Switzerland) H Laaksonen	6	6
8	(United States) B Fratangelo	7^{7}	4	3
(Australia) S Groth	6^{5}	6	6
(Chinese Taipei) J Jung	7	6
SE	(United Kingdom) C Norrie	5	4
Q	(Indonesia) C Rungkat	2	3
(Barbados) D King	6	6
(Australia) A Santillan	6	5	6
2	(Australia) J Thompson	4	7	2

Second round
5	(Kazakhstan) M Kukushkin	7^{7}	6^{3}	3
WC	(United States) D Novikov	6^{3}	7^{7}	6
(Kazakhstan) A Bublik	6	6
3	(Switzerland) H Laaksonen	1	1
(Australia) S Groth	4	6	6
(Chinese Taipei) J Jung	6	3	0
(Barbados) D King	3	4
(Australia) A Santillan	6	6

Quarterfinals
WC	(United States) D Novikov	1	4
(Kazakhstan) A Bublik	6	6
(Australia) S Groth	7	7^{8}
(Australia) A Santillan	5	6^{6}

Semifinals
(Kazakhstan) A Bublik	7^{7}	6
(Australia) S Groth	6^{2}	3
