= 2016 Nordic Naturals Challenger – Doubles =

Doubles
- 2016 Nordic Naturals Challenger

Final
- Champions: (South Africa) Nicolaas Scholtz (South Africa) Tucker Vorster
- Runners-up: (United States) Mackenzie McDonald (New Zealand) Ben McLachlan
- Score: 6–7^{(5–7)}, 6–3, [10–8]

Events
Singles	Doubles
- Nordic Naturals Challenger

Chris Guccione and Artem Sitak were the defending champions but chose not to defend their title.

Nicolaas Scholtz and Tucker Vorster won the title after defeating Mackenzie McDonald and Ben McLachlan 6–7^{(5–7)}, 6–3, [10–8] in the final.

== Seeds ==
1. (South Africa) Dean O'Brien / (South Africa) Ruan Roelofse (quarterfinals)
2. (United States) Nicolas Meister / (United States) Eric Quigley (first round)
3. (United States) Stefan Kozlov / (Australia) Matt Reid (semifinals, withdrew)
4. (United States) Sekou Bangoura / (United States) Evan King (first round)

== Draw ==
Key

- Q = Qualifier
- WC = Wild card
- LL = Lucky loser
- Alt = Alternate
- ITF = ITF entry
- PR = Protected ranking
- SR = Special ranking
- SE = Special exempt
- JE = Junior exempt
- JR = Junior Accelerator Programme entrant
- CO = College Accelerator Programme entrant
- NG = Next Gen Accelerator Program entrant
- w/o = Walkover
- r = Retired
- d = Defaulted

First round
WC	(Italy) Erik Crepaldi (United States) Joshua Pompan	2	1
(South Africa) N Scholtz (South Africa) T Vorster	6	6
4	(United States) S Bangoura (United States) E King	4	6	[4]
(United Kingdom) C Norrie (United States) C Thompson	6	2	[10]
(Japan) Y Nishioka (Japan) Y Uchiyama	6	6
WC	(South Africa) Rikus De Villiers (United States) T Fawcett	4	3
(United Kingdom) L Broady (India) R Ramanathan	6	6
(United States) John Lamble (Portugal) B Saraiva	4	2
(United States) M Krueger (United States) A Kuznetsov	7	3	[10]
3	(United States) S Kozlov (Australia) M Reid	5	6	[12]
(United States) M McDonald (New Zealand) B McLachlan	6	6
(United Kingdom) D Evans (United Kingdom) L Glasspool	1	4
(United States) A Halebian (United States) R Sarmiento	1	6	[13]
2	(United States) N Meister (United States) E Quigley	6	4	[11]

Quarterfinals
1	(South Africa) D O'Brien (South Africa) R Roelofse	4	2
(South Africa) N Scholtz (South Africa) T Vorster	6	6
(United Kingdom) C Norrie (United States) C Thompson	4	3
(Japan) Y Nishioka (Japan) Y Uchiyama	6	6
(United Kingdom) L Broady (India) R Ramanathan	2	2
3	(United States) S Kozlov (Australia) M Reid	6	6
(United States) M McDonald (New Zealand) B McLachlan	7	3	[10]
(United States) A Halebian (United States) R Sarmiento	5	6	[1]

Semifinals
(South Africa) N Scholtz (South Africa) T Vorster	6	7^{8}
(Japan) Y Nishioka (Japan) Y Uchiyama	3	6^{6}
3	(United States) S Kozlov (Australia) M Reid
(United States) M McDonald (New Zealand) B McLachlan	w/o

Final
(South Africa) N Scholtz (South Africa) T Vorster	6^{5}	6	[10]
(United States) M McDonald (New Zealand) B McLachlan	7^{7}	3	[8]
