= 2016 Nordic Naturals Challenger =

- Date: 8–14 August
- Edition: 29th
- Location: Aptos, California, United States

Champions

Singles
- (United Kingdom) Daniel Evans

Doubles
- (South Africa) Nicolaas Scholtz / (South Africa) Tucker Vorster
← 2015 ·	Nordic Naturals Challenger	· 2017 →

The 2016 Nordic Naturals Challenger was a professional tennis tournament played on hard courts. It was the 29th edition of the tournament which was part of the 2016 ATP Challenger Tour. It took place in Aptos, California, United States between 8 and 14 August 2016.

== Singles main-draw entrants ==
=== Seeds ===
Country	Player	Rank^{1}	Seed
GBR	Daniel Evans	82	1
JPN	Yoshihito Nishioka	97	2
USA	Bjorn Fratangelo	119	3
USA	Stefan Kozlov	161	4
IND	Ramkumar Ramanathan	199	5
USA	Ernesto Escobedo	205	6
UZB	Farrukh Dustov	220	7
USA	~~Daniel Nguyen~~	~~226~~	~~8~~

- ^{1} Rankings are as of August 1, 2016.

=== Other entrants ===
The following players received wildcards into the singles main draw:

- (United States) Christopher Eubanks
- (United States) Tom Fawcett
- (United States) Clay Thompson
- (United States) Mackenzie McDonald

The following players received entry from the qualifying draw:

- (United States) John Lamble
- (United Kingdom) Cameron Norrie
- (United States) Eric Quigley
- (United States) Raymond Sarmiento

The following player received entry as a lucky loser:

- (United States) Alexios Halebian

== Champions ==
=== Singles ===
- (United Kingdom) Daniel Evans def. (United Kingdom) Cameron Norrie, 6–3, 6–4

=== Doubles ===
- (South Africa) Nicolaas Scholtz / (South Africa) Tucker Vorster def. (United States) Mackenzie McDonald / (New Zealand) Ben McLachlan, 6–7^{(5–7)}, 6–3, [10–8]
