= 2015 Comerica Bank Challenger – Singles =

Singles
- 2015 Comerica Bank Challenger

Final
- Champion: (Australia) John Millman
- Runner-up: (United States) Austin Krajicek
- Score: 7–5, 2–6, 6–3

Events
Singles	Doubles
← 2014 ·	Comerica Bank Challenger	· 2016 →

Marcos Baghdatis was the defending champion but chose not to compete.

John Millman won the tournament, defeating Austin Krajicek in the final, 7–5, 2–6, 6–3.

== Seeds ==
1. (Australia) John Millman (champion)
2. (Tunisia) Malek Jaziri (quarterfinals)
3. (United Kingdom) Kyle Edmund (semifinals)
4. (United States) Bjorn Fratangelo (semifinals)
5. (Japan) Taro Daniel (quarterfinals)
6. (Australia) Matthew Ebden (quarterfinals)
7. (United States) Austin Krajicek (final)
8. (Japan) Yoshihito Nishioka (quarterfinals)

== Draw ==
=== Key ===
- Q = Qualifier
- WC = Wild card
- LL = Lucky loser
- Alt = Alternate
- SE = Special exempt
- PR = Protected ranking
- ITF = ITF entry
- JE = Junior exempt
- w/o = Walkover
- r = Retired
- d = Defaulted
- SR = Special ranking

=== Finals ===
Semifinals
1	(Australia) John Millman	3	6	7
3	(United Kingdom) Kyle Edmund	6	4	5
4	(United States) Bjorn Fratangelo	3	6^{2}
7	(United States) Austin Krajicek	6	7^{7}

Final
1	(Australia) John Millman	7	2	6
7	(United States) Austin Krajicek	5	6	3

=== Top half ===
First round
1	(Australia) J Millman	6	6
Alt	(United States) A Sarkissian	2	0
(United Kingdom) B Klein	4	4
(Argentina) G Andreozzi	6	6
(Uzbekistan) F Dustov	1	6	6
Q	(United States) T Sandgren	6	2	1
Q	(China) Z Zhang	6^{6}	2
5	(Japan) T Daniel	7^{8}	6
3	(United Kingdom) K Edmund	6	6
LL	(Japan) T Niki	1	2
(Estonia) J Zopp	4	4
Q	(United States) D Nguyen	6	6
WC	(United States) J Donaldson	7^{7}	6
(Portugal) G Elias	6^{2}	3
WC	(United States) M Krueger	3	6	3
8	(Japan) Y Nishioka	6	1	6

Second round
1	(Australia) J Millman	6	6
(Argentina) G Andreozzi	3	2
(Uzbekistan) F Dustov	7^{7}	5	0
5	(Japan) T Daniel	6^{5}	7	6
3	(United Kingdom) K Edmund	7	6
Q	(United States) D Nguyen	5	3
WC	(United States) J Donaldson	6	3	3
8	(Japan) Y Nishioka	4	6	6

Quarterfinals
1	(Australia) J Millman	6	6
5	(Japan) T Daniel	1	3
3	(United Kingdom) K Edmund	3	6	6
8	(Japan) Y Nishioka	6	3	3

Semifinals
1	(Australia) J Millman	3	6	7
3	(United Kingdom) K Edmund	6	4	5

=== Bottom half ===
First round
6	(Australia) M Ebden	7^{7}	6
(United Kingdom) L Broady	6^{4}	3
WC	(Germany) T Haas	6	6
(Russia) A Rublev	4	3
(India) Y Bhambri	2	2
(Sweden) E Ymer	6	6
(Romania) M Copil	6	5	2
4	(United States) B Fratangelo	3	7	6
7	(United States) A Krajicek	6^{4}	6	7^{9}
Alt	(United States) D Novikov	7^{7}	4	6^{7}
Q	(Germany) M Zverev	6^{1}	7	6
WC	(United States) TH Fritz	7^{7}	5	3
(Brazil) G Clezar	6	1	6
(India) S Devvarman	2	6	3
(Russia) K Khachanov	3	1
2	(Tunisia) M Jaziri	6	6

Second round
6	(Australia) M Ebden	2	7^{7}	6
WC	(Germany) T Haas	6	6^{5}	4
(Sweden) E Ymer	3	4
4	(United States) B Fratangelo	6	6
7	(United States) A Krajicek	6	6
Q	(Germany) M Zverev	3	4
(Brazil) G Clezar	3	6	3
2	(Tunisia) M Jaziri	6	3	6

Quarterfinals
6	(Australia) M Ebden	4	2
4	(United States) B Fratangelo	6	6
7	(United States) A Krajicek	6	6
2	(Tunisia) M Jaziri	3	4

Semifinals
4	(United States) B Fratangelo	3	6^{2}
7	(United States) A Krajicek	6	7^{7}
