= 2017 Nordic Naturals Challenger – Doubles =

Doubles
- 2017 Nordic Naturals Challenger

Final
- Champions: (Israel) Jonathan Erlich (United Kingdom) Neal Skupski
- Runners-up: (Australia) Alex Bolt (Australia) Jordan Thompson
- Score: 6–3, 2–6, [10–8]

Events
Singles	Doubles
- Nordic Naturals Challenger

Nicolaas Scholtz and Tucker Vorster were the defending champions but chose not to defend their title.

Jonathan Erlich and Neal Skupski won the title after defeating Alex Bolt and Jordan Thompson 6–3, 2–6, [10–8] in the final.

== Seeds ==
1. (Netherlands) Wesley Koolhof / (New Zealand) Artem Sitak (semifinals)
2. (Australia) Sam Groth / (United States) Scott Lipsky (first round)
3. (Israel) Jonathan Erlich / (United Kingdom) Neal Skupski (champions)
4. (Australia) Alex Bolt / (Australia) Jordan Thompson (final)

== Draw ==
Key

- Q = Qualifier
- WC = Wild card
- LL = Lucky loser
- Alt = Alternate
- ITF = ITF entry
- PR = Protected ranking
- SR = Special ranking
- SE = Special exempt
- JE = Junior exempt
- JR = Junior Accelerator Programme entrant
- CO = College Accelerator Programme entrant
- NG = Next Gen Accelerator Program entrant
- w/o = Walkover
- r = Retired
- d = Defaulted

First round
1	(Netherlands) W Koolhof (New Zealand) A Sitak	6	7^{7}
(United States) A Krajicek (United States) J Withrow	4	6^{5}
WC	(United States) T Fritz (United States) M Krueger	7	7
WC	(United States) Luca Corinteli (United States) M McDonald	5	5
4	(Australia) A Bolt (Australia) J Thompson	4	6	[10]
(Norway) C Ruud (Australia) A Santillan	6	2	[7]
(Australia) S de Waard (Japan) B McLachlan	6	7^{11}
PR	(Russia) K Kravchuk (Russia) D Tursunov	3	6^{9}
(United States) D Novikov (Sweden) A Siljeström	4	4
Q	(Chinese Taipei) J Jung (Barbados) D King	6	6
WC	(United Kingdom) L Bambridge (Republic of Ireland) D O'Hare	3	2
3	(Israel) J Erlich (United Kingdom) N Skupski	6	6
(Kazakhstan) A Bublik (Australia) B Mousley	2	6	[3]
(South Africa) R Roelofse (Indonesia) C Rungkat	6	1	[10]
LL	(Belgium) R Bemelmans (Belgium) J De Loore	6	6
2	(Australia) S Groth (United States) S Lipsky	4	4

Quarterfinals
1	(Netherlands) W Koolhof (New Zealand) A Sitak	w/o
WC	(United States) T Fritz (United States) M Krueger
4	(Australia) A Bolt (Australia) J Thompson	6	6
(Australia) S de Waard (Japan) B McLachlan	1	3
Q	(Chinese Taipei) J Jung (Barbados) D King	7	4	[11]
3	(Israel) J Erlich (United Kingdom) N Skupski	5	6	[13]
(South Africa) R Roelofse (Indonesia) C Rungkat	7^{7}	4	[4]
LL	(Belgium) R Bemelmans (Belgium) J De Loore	6^{3}	6	[10]

Semifinals
1	(Netherlands) W Koolhof (New Zealand) A Sitak	3	6	[8]
4	(Australia) A Bolt (Australia) J Thompson	6	2	[10]
3	(Israel) J Erlich (United Kingdom) N Skupski	3	6	[12]
LL	(Belgium) R Bemelmans (Belgium) J De Loore	6	4	[10]

Final
4	(Australia) A Bolt (Australia) J Thompson	3	6	[8]
3	(Israel) J Erlich (United Kingdom) N Skupski	6	2	[10]
