= 2018 Nordic Naturals Challenger – Doubles =

Doubles
- 2018 Nordic Naturals Challenger

Final
- Champions: (Australia) Thanasi Kokkinakis (Australia) Matt Reid
- Runners-up: (United Kingdom) Jonny O'Mara (United Kingdom) Joe Salisbury
- Score: 6–2, 4–6, [10–8]

Events
Singles	Doubles
← 2017 ·	Nordic Naturals Challenger	· 2019 →

Jonathan Erlich and Neal Skupski were the defending champions but chose to defend their title with different partners. Erlich partnered Ruan Roelofse but lost in the first round to Thanasi Kokkinakis and Matt Reid. Skupski partnered Luke Bambridge but lost in the semifinals to Kokkinakis and Reid.

Kokkinakis and Reid won the title after defeating Jonny O'Mara and Joe Salisbury 6–2, 4–6, [10–8] in the final.

== Seeds ==
1. (United Kingdom) Jonny O'Mara / (United Kingdom) Joe Salisbury (final)
2. (United Kingdom) Luke Bambridge / (United Kingdom) Neal Skupski (semifinals)
3. (India) Jeevan Nedunchezhiyan / (India) Purav Raja (quarterfinals)
4. (Israel) Jonathan Erlich / (South Africa) Ruan Roelofse (first round)

== Draw ==
=== Key ===
- Q = Qualifier
- WC = Wild card
- LL = Lucky loser
- Alt = Alternate
- SE = Special exempt
- PR = Protected ranking
- ITF = ITF entry
- JE = Junior exempt
- w/o = Walkover
- r = Retired
- d = Defaulted
- SR = Special ranking

First round
1	(United Kingdom) J O'Mara (United Kingdom) J Salisbury	6	6
(United States) R Galloway (Venezuela) R Maytín	3	2
(Italy) T Fabbiano (Australia) L Saville	6^{5}	5
WC	(United States) C Eubanks (United States) H Reese	7^{7}	7
3	(India) J Nedunchezhiyan (India) P Raja	6	6
WC	(United States) H Johnson (United States) Y Johnson	2	4
(Australia) M Polmans (Australia) M Purcell	3	7^{7}	[12]
WC	(United States) JP Fruttero (United States) D Novikov	6	6^{2}	[10]
Q	(United States) JC Aragone (United States) Ma Redlicki	6^{3}	6	[7]
(Mexico) H Hach Verdugo (Sweden) A Siljeström	7^{7}	1	[10]
(Australia) T Kokkinakis (Australia) M Reid	3	6	[10]
4	(Israel) J Erlich (South Africa) R Roelofse	6	2	[7]
(South Africa) L Harris (Egypt) M Safwat	6	2	[8]
(United States) E King (United States) N Pasha	3	6	[10]
(United States) K King (France) F Martin	6	2	[5]
2	(United Kingdom) L Bambridge (United Kingdom) N Skupski	2	6	[10]

Quarterfinals
1	(United Kingdom) J O'Mara (United Kingdom) J Salisbury	7^{7}	6
WC	(United States) C Eubanks (United States) H Reese	6^{2}	4
3	(India) J Nedunchezhiyan (India) P Raja	6^{5}	2
(Australia) M Polmans (Australia) M Purcell	7^{7}	6
(Mexico) H Hach Verdugo (Sweden) A Siljeström	6^{8}	3
(Australia) T Kokkinakis (Australia) M Reid	7^{10}	6
(United States) E King (United States) N Pasha	3	5
2	(United Kingdom) L Bambridge (United Kingdom) N Skupski	6	7

Semifinals
1	(United Kingdom) J O'Mara (United Kingdom) J Salisbury	6	6
(Australia) M Polmans (Australia) M Purcell	1	1
(Australia) T Kokkinakis (Australia) M Reid	3	7	[10]
2	(United Kingdom) L Bambridge (United Kingdom) N Skupski	6	5	[6]

Final
1	(United Kingdom) J O'Mara (United Kingdom) J Salisbury	2	6	[8]
(Australia) T Kokkinakis (Australia) M Reid	6	4	[10]
