= 2015 Comerica Bank Challenger – Doubles =

Doubles
- 2015 Comerica Bank Challenger

Final
- Champion: (Australia) Chris Guccione (New Zealand) Artem Sitak
- Runner-up: (India) Yuki Bhambri (Australia) Matthew Ebden
- Score: 6–4, 7–6^{(7–2)}

Events
Singles	Doubles
← 2014 ·	Comerica Bank Challenger	· 2016 →

Ruben Bemelmans and Laurynas Grigelis were the defending champions, but chose not to participate.

Chris Guccione and Artem Sitak won the tournament, defeating Yuki Bhambri and Matthew Ebden in the final, 6–4, 7–6^{(7–2)}.

== Seeds ==
1. (Australia) Chris Guccione / (New Zealand) Artem Sitak (champions)
2. (United States) Austin Krajicek / (United States) Nicholas Monroe (semifinals)
3. (South Africa) Dean O'Brien / (South Africa) Ruan Roelofse (quarterfinals)
4. (Chile) Julio Peralta / (United States) Matt Seeberger (first round)

== Draw ==
=== Key ===
- Q = Qualifier
- WC = Wild card
- LL = Lucky loser
- Alt = Alternate
- SE = Special exempt
- PR = Protected ranking
- ITF = ITF entry
- JE = Junior exempt
- w/o = Walkover
- r = Retired
- d = Defaulted
- SR = Special ranking

First round
1	(Australia) C Guccione (New Zealand) A Sitak	2	7	[10]
WC	(United States) D Nguyen (United States) D Novikov	6	5	[6]
(Brazil) G Clezar (United Kingdom) B Klein	6^{4}	7^{7}	[8]
LL	(Philippines) R Gonzales (United Kingdom) D Walsh	7^{7}	6^{5}	[10]
3	(South Africa) D O'Brien (South Africa) R Roelofse	5	6	[10]
(Argentina) G Andreozzi (Chile) N Jarry	7	3	[8]
(Australia) C Ball (India) S Devvarman	7^{7}	1	[8]
(Russia) K Khachanov (Sweden) E Ymer	6^{3}	6	[10]
(Uzbekistan) F Dustov (Estonia) J Zopp	5	5
(Tunisia) M Jaziri (China) Z Zhang	7	7
(India) Y Bhambri (Australia) M Ebden	7^{7}	7^{7}
4	(Chile) J Peralta (United States) M Seeberger	6^{5}	6^{3}
WC	(United States) Andre Dome (United States) JP Fruttero	3	6^{3}
Q	(Romania) M Copil (Russia) A Rublev	6	7^{7}
WC	(United States) D Baughman (United States) Eric Johnson	3	6^{3}
2	(United States) A Krajicek (United States) N Monroe	6	7^{7}

Quarterfinals
1	(Australia) C Guccione (New Zealand) A Sitak	6	6
LL	(Philippines) R Gonzales (United Kingdom) D Walsh	3	4
3	(South Africa) D O'Brien (South Africa) R Roelofse	2	6	[8]
(Russia) K Khachanov (Sweden) E Ymer	6	2	[10]
(Tunisia) M Jaziri (China) Z Zhang	5	2
(India) Y Bhambri (Australia) M Ebden	7	6
Q	(Romania) M Copil (Russia) A Rublev	3	6	[7]
2	(United States) A Krajicek (United States) N Monroe	6	1	[10]

Semifinals
1	(Australia) C Guccione (New Zealand) A Sitak	7	6^{3}	[10]
(Russia) K Khachanov (Sweden) E Ymer	5	7^{7}	[4]
(India) Y Bhambri (Australia) M Ebden	5	6	[10]
2	(United States) A Krajicek (United States) N Monroe	7	4	[8]

Final
1	(Australia) C Guccione (New Zealand) A Sitak	6	7^{7}
(India) Y Bhambri (Australia) M Ebden	4	6^{2}
