= 2011 Comerica Bank Challenger – Doubles =

Doubles
- 2011 Comerica Bank Challenger

Final
- Champions: (Australia) Carsten Ball (Australia) Chris Guccione
- Runners-up: (United States) John Paul Fruttero (South Africa) Raven Klaasen
- Score: 7–6^{(7–5)}, 6–4

Events
Singles	Doubles
← 2010 ·	Comerica Bank Challenger	· 2012 →

Carsten Ball and Chris Guccione successfully defended their 2010 title, defeating John Paul Fruttero and Raven Klaasen in the final, 7–6^{(7–5)}, 6–4.

== Seeds ==
1. (Australia) Carsten Ball / (Australia) Chris Guccione (champions)
2. (Australia) Jordan Kerr / (United States) David Martin (quarterfinals)
3. (United States) John Paul Fruttero / (South Africa) Raven Klaasen (final)
4. (United States) Nicholas Monroe / (New Zealand) Artem Sitak (semifinals)

== Draw ==
=== Key ===
- Q = Qualifier
- WC = Wild card
- LL = Lucky loser
- Alt = Alternate
- SE = Special exempt
- PR = Protected ranking
- ITF = ITF entry
- JE = Junior exempt
- w/o = Walkover
- r = Retired
- d = Defaulted
- SR = Special ranking

=== Draw ===
First round
1	(Australia) C Ball (Australia) C Guccione	6	6
LL	(United States) Todd Conley (United States) Ed Lane	0	1
(Bosnia and Herzegovina) A Delić (Canada) P-L Duclos	6^{7}	6	[7]
Q	(United States) B Battistone (United States) C Wettengel	7^{9}	4	[10]
4	(United States) N Monroe (New Zealand) A Sitak	6	6
(United States) Greg Ouellette (New Zealand) M Venus	4	4
(Lithuania) L Grigelis (Russia) I Kunitsyn	7	4	7
(Serbia) I Bozoljac (United Kingdom) K Skupski	6^{3}	6	10
WC	(United States) Andre Dome (South Africa) Matt Fawcett	4	6^{5}
(United States) S Johnson (United States) B Klahn	6	7^{7}
LL	(United States) Nick Pacac (Czech Republic) Rudolf Siwy	2	4
3	(United States) JP Fruttero (South Africa) R Klaasen	6	6
(Japan) T Matsui (United States) W Odesnik	6	7
WC	(United States) D Lajola (United States) D Young	2	6^{4}
WC	(United States) J Sock (United States) R Williams	7	4	[7]
2	(Australia) J Kerr (United States) D Martin	5	6	[10]

Quarterfinals
1	(Australia) C Ball (Australia) C Guccione	7	2	[10]
Q	(United States) B Battistone (United States) C Wettengel	5	6	[6]
4	(United States) N Monroe (New Zealand) A Sitak	7	6
(Serbia) I Bozoljac (United Kingdom) K Skupski	5	2
(United States) S Johnson (United States) B Klahn	1	6^{4}
3	(United States) JP Fruttero (South Africa) R Klaasen	6	7^{7}
(Japan) T Matsui (United States) W Odesnik	6	6
2	(Australia) J Kerr (United States) D Martin	3	4

Semifinals
1	(Australia) C Ball (Australia) C Guccione	6	6^{3}	[10]
4	(United States) N Monroe (New Zealand) A Sitak	2	7^{7}	[5]
3	(United States) JP Fruttero (South Africa) R Klaasen	4	6	[10]
(Japan) T Matsui (United States) W Odesnik	6	3	[5]

Final
1	(Australia) C Ball (Australia) C Guccione	7^{7}	6
3	(United States) JP Fruttero (South Africa) R Klaasen	6^{5}	4
