= 2009 Comerica Bank Challenger – Doubles =

Doubles
- 2009 Comerica Bank Challenger

Final
- Champions: (Australia) Carsten Ball (Australia) Chris Guccione
- Runners-up: (Thailand) Sanchai Ratiwatana (Thailand) Sonchat Ratiwatana
- Score: 6–3, 6–2

Events
Singles	Doubles
← 2008 ·	Comerica Bank Challenger	· 2010 →

Noam Okun and Amir Weintraub were the defending champions, but they didn't start this year.
Carsten Ball and Chris Guccione won the tournament, after defeating Sanchai Ratiwatana and Sonchat Ratiwatana in the final 6–3, 6–2.

== Seeds ==
1. (Thailand) Sanchai Ratiwatana / (Thailand) Sonchat Ratiwatana (final)
2. (India) Harsh Mankad / (United States) David Martin (semifinals)
3. (Australia) Carsten Ball / (Australia) Chris Guccione (champions)
4. (United States) Brian Battistone / (United States) Nicholas Monroe (quarterfinals)

== Draw ==
=== Key ===
- Q = Qualifier
- WC = Wild card
- LL = Lucky loser
- Alt = Alternate
- SE = Special exempt
- PR = Protected ranking
- ITF = ITF entry
- JE = Junior exempt
- w/o = Walkover
- r = Retired
- d = Defaulted
- SR = Special ranking

=== Draw ===
First round
1	(Thailand) Sa Ratiwatana (Thailand) So Ratiwatana	7	6
(India) S Devvarman (Philippines) TC Huey	6^{5}	4
(United States) S Jenkins; D Young	6	6
(Japan) H Kondo (Japan) Y Sugita	3	4
4	(United States) B Battistone (United States) N Monroe	6	5	[10]
WC	(United States) P Simmonds (United States) R Sweeting	4	7	[8]
(South Korea) KT Im (United States) K Kim	3	4
WC	(United States) L Cook (United States) M Yani	6	6
(Australia) N Lindahl (South Africa) I van der Merwe	6	7
Q	(United States) JP Fruttero (United States) B Joelson	1	5
WC	(United States) R Kepler (United States) R Leach	1	4
3	(Australia) C Ball (Australia) C Guccione	6	6
(United States) R DeHeart (Australia) M Matosevic	2	6^{4}
(United States) A Bogomolov Jr. (Australia) S Groth	6	7
(Japan) G Soeda (Thailand) D Udomchoke	3	2
2	(India) H Mankad (United States) D Martin	6	6

Quarterfinals
1	(Thailand) Sa Ratiwatana (Thailand) So Ratiwatana	6	3	[10]
(United States) S Jenkins; D Young	4	6	[5]
4	(United States) B Battistone (United States) N Monroe	6^{4}	6^{3}
WC	(United States) L Cook (United States) M Yani	7	7
(Australia) N Lindahl (South Africa) I van der Merwe	3	4
3	(Australia) C Ball (Australia) C Guccione	6	6
(United States) A Bogomolov Jr. (Australia) S Groth	3	2
2	(India) H Mankad (United States) D Martin	6	6

Semifinals
1	(Thailand) Sa Ratiwatana (Thailand) So Ratiwatana	6	6
WC	(United States) L Cook (United States) M Yani	4	3
3	(Australia) C Ball (Australia) C Guccione	6	6
2	(India) H Mankad (United States) D Martin	3	3

Finals
1	(Thailand) Sa Ratiwatana (Thailand) So Ratiwatana	3	2
3	(Australia) C Ball (Australia) C Guccione	6	6
