= 2010 Comerica Bank Challenger =

- Date: July 12 – July 18
- Edition: 23rd
- Location: Aptos, United States

Champions

Singles
- (Australia) Marinko Matosevic

Doubles
- (Australia) Carsten Ball / (Australia) Chris Guccione
← 2009 ·	Comerica Bank Challenger	· 2011 →

The 2010 Comerica Bank Challenger was a professional tennis tournament played on hard court. This was the twenty-third edition of the tournament which is part of the 2010 ATP Challenger Tour. It took place in Aptos, United States between 12 July and 18 July 2010.

== Singles main draw entrants ==
=== Seeds ===
Nationality	Player	Ranking*	Seeding
USA	Rajeev Ram	98	1
IND	Somdev Devvarman	107	2
USA	Donald Young	111	3
AUS	Carsten Ball	131	4
SRB	Ilija Bozoljac	137	5
USA	Kevin Kim	147	6
GBR	Alex Bogdanovic	172	7
USA	Tim Smyczek	180	8

- Rankings are as of July 5, 2010.

=== Other entrants ===
The following players received wildcards into the singles main draw:

- (United States) Devin Britton
- (United States) Chase Buchanan
- (United States) Daniel Kosakowski
- (United States) Bradley Klahn

The following players received a place as a special entrant:

- (United Kingdom) Richard Bloomfield

The following players received entry from the qualifying draw:

- (Slovakia) Karol Beck
- (Australia) Dayne Kelly
- (Australia) Brydan Klein
- (Russia) Artem Sitak

== Champions ==
=== Singles ===
(Australia) Marinko Matosevic def. (United States) Donald Young, 6–4, 6–2

=== Doubles ===
(Australia) Carsten Ball / (Australia) Chris Guccione def. (Australia) Adam Feeney / (Australia) Greg Jones, 6–1, 6–3
