= 2012 Comerica Bank Challenger – Singles =

Singles
- 2012 Comerica Bank Challenger

Final
- Champion: (United States) Steve Johnson
- Runner-up: (Colombia) Robert Farah
- Score: 6–3, 6–3

Events
Singles	Doubles
← 2011 ·	Comerica Bank Challenger	· 2013 →

Laurynas Grigelis was the defending champion, but did not participate this year. Steve Johnson won the title, defeating Robert Farah 6–3, 6–3 in the final.

== Seeds ==
1. (United States) Brian Baker (first round)
2. (Russia) Igor Andreev (first round)
3. (United States) Rajeev Ram (first round)
4. (Netherlands) Igor Sijsling (withdrew due to gastroenteritis)
5. (Germany) Tobias Kamke (first round)
6. (France) Florent Serra (second round)
7. (South Africa) Izak van der Merwe (first round)
8. (United States) Denis Kudla (first round)

== Draw ==
=== Key ===
- Q = Qualifier
- WC = Wild card
- LL = Lucky loser
- Alt = Alternate
- SE = Special exempt
- PR = Protected ranking
- ITF = ITF entry
- JE = Junior exempt
- w/o = Walkover
- r = Retired
- d = Defaulted
- SR = Special ranking

=== Finals ===
Semifinals
(Czech Republic) Jan Hernych	3	4
WC	(United States) Steve Johnson	6	6
Q	(Serbia) Ilija Bozoljac	6	2	4
(Colombia) Robert Farah	4	6	6

Final
WC	(United States) Steve Johnson	6	6
(Colombia) Robert Farah	3	3

=== Top half ===
First round
1/WC	(United States) B Baker	7	4	2
(Belgium) M Authom	5	6	6
(Romania) M Copil	3	6	3
(Chinese Taipei) J Wang	6	2	6
(Brazil) F Romboli	4	4
(Czech Republic) J Hernych	6	6
SE	(Ukraine) S Bubka	6	7^{7}
5	(Germany) T Kamke	3	6^{3}
3	(United States) R Ram	3	4
Q	(Russia) D Tursunov	6	6
(Colombia) C Salamanca	3	5
WC	(United States) S Johnson	6	7
(United States) M Yani	3	1
Q	(United States) J Dadamo	6	6
(South Africa) R de Voest	6	6
8	(United States) D Kudla	2	2

Second round
(Belgium) M Authom	4	6	1
(Chinese Taipei) J Wang	6	4	6
(Czech Republic) J Hernych	7	6
(Ukraine) S Bubka	5	3
Q	(Russia) D Tursunov	4	r
WC	(United States) S Johnson	6
Q	(United States) J Dadamo	2	7	3
(South Africa) R de Voest	6	5	6

Quarterfinals
(Chinese Taipei) J Wang	3	6^{5}
(Czech Republic) J Hernych	6	7^{7}
WC	(United States) S Johnson	6	6
(South Africa) R de Voest	3	4

Semifinals
(Czech Republic) J Hernych	3	4
WC	(United States) S Johnson	6	6

=== Bottom half ===
First round
6	(France) F Serra	6	3	6
(Argentina) G Pella	3	6	2
(Germany) M Zverev	5	6	1
Q	(Serbia) I Bozoljac	7	4	6
(United Kingdom) J Baker	3	1
WC	(United States) R Ginepri	6	6
(United States) A Kuznetsov	4	6	6^{2}
LL	(United States) M McClune	6	2	7^{7}
7	(South Africa) I van der Merwe	4	6^{1}
(Israel) A Weintraub	6	7^{7}
(Colombia) R Farah	4	6	6
(Moldova) R Borvanov	6	4	2
(Chinese Taipei) T-h Yang	5	6	6^{3}
Q	(Australia) M Reid	7	0	7^{7}
WC	(United States) B Klahn	7^{7}	6
2	(Russia) I Andreev	6^{3}	4

Second round
6	(France) F Serra	3	4
Q	(Serbia) I Bozoljac	6	6
WC	(United States) R Ginepri	1	6^{4}
LL	(United States) M McClune	6	7^{7}
(Israel) A Weintraub	6^{2}	3
(Colombia) R Farah	7^{7}	6
Q	(Australia) M Reid	5	4
WC	(United States) B Klahn	7	6

Quarterfinals
Q	(Serbia) I Bozoljac	7^{7}	6
LL	(United States) M McClune	6^{4}	2
(Colombia) R Farah	6	7
WC	(United States) B Klahn	4	5

Semifinals
Q	(Serbia) I Bozoljac	6	2	4
(Colombia) R Farah	4	6	6
