= 2013 Comerica Bank Challenger – Doubles =

Doubles
- 2013 Comerica Bank Challenger

Final
- Champion: (Israel) Jonathan Erlich (Israel) Andy Ram
- Runner-up: (Australia) Chris Guccione (Australia) Matt Reid
- Score: 6–3, 6–7^{(6–8)}, [10–2]

Events
Singles	Doubles
← 2012 ·	Comerica Bank Challenger	· 2014 →

Rik De Voest and John Peers were the defending champions, but chose not to compete.
Jonathan Erlich and Andy Ram defeated Chris Guccione and Matt Reid 6–3, 6–7^{(6–8)}, [10–2].

== Seeds ==
1. (India) Purav Raja / (India) Divij Sharan (first round)
2. (Australia) Samuel Groth / (Australia) John-Patrick Smith (withdrew)
3. (Israel) Jonathan Erlich / (Israel) Andy Ram (champion)
4. (Australia) Chris Guccione / (Australia) Matt Reid (final)

== Draw ==
=== Key ===
- Q = Qualifier
- WC = Wild card
- LL = Lucky loser
- Alt = Alternate
- SE = Special exempt
- PR = Protected ranking
- ITF = ITF entry
- JE = Junior exempt
- w/o = Walkover
- r = Retired
- d = Defaulted
- SR = Special ranking

First round
1	(India) P Raja (India) D Sharan	4	2
(Belgium) M Authom (Belgium) O Rochus	6	6
(Belgium) R Bemelmans (Denmark) F Nielsen	6	6
WC	(United States) R Kepler (Australia) B Weston	4	2
4	(Australia) C Guccione (Australia) M Reid	6	6
(Moldova) R Borvanov (New Zealand) A Sitak	3	4
(Uzbekistan) F Dustov (Tunisia) M Jaziri	7	7
(United States) W Odesnik (United States) T Sandgren	5	5
(Kazakhstan) M Kukushkin (Ukraine) D Molchanov	6	3	[10]
Q	(United States) B Fratangelo (United States) M Krueger	4	6	[3]
(United States) J Cerretani (New Zealand) M Venus	3	4
3	(Israel) J Erlich (Israel) A Ram	6	6
WC	(United States) A Dome (United States) J Kepler	4	1
(Japan) T Ito (Japan) H Moriya	6	6
WC	(United States) M Giron (United States) R Sarmiento	6	6
LL	(United States) J Dadamo (United States) D Novikov	3	4

Quarterfinals
(Belgium) M Authom (Belgium) O Rochus	6^{6}	7^{7}	[4]
(Belgium) R Bemelmans (Denmark) F Nielsen	7^{8}	6^{2}	[10]
4	(Australia) C Guccione (Australia) M Reid	6	5	[10]
(Uzbekistan) F Dustov (Tunisia) M Jaziri	4	7	[2]
(Kazakhstan) M Kukushkin (Ukraine) D Molchanov	7^{7}	1	[7]
3	(Israel) J Erlich (Israel) A Ram	6^{4}	6	[10]
(Japan) T Ito (Japan) H Moriya	6	3	[10]
WC	(United States) M Giron (United States) R Sarmiento	4	6	[4]

Semifinals
(Belgium) R Bemelmans (Denmark) F Nielsen	6^{5}	5
4	(Australia) C Guccione (Australia) M Reid	7^{7}	7
3	(Israel) J Erlich (Israel) A Ram	6	6
(Japan) T Ito (Japan) H Moriya	3	4

Final
4	(Australia) C Guccione (Australia) M Reid	3	7^{8}	[2]
3	(Israel) J Erlich (Israel) A Ram	6	6^{6}	[10]
