= 2010 Comerica Bank Challenger – Doubles =

Doubles
- 2010 Comerica Bank Challenger

Final
- Champions: (Australia) Carsten Ball (Australia) Chris Guccione
- Runners-up: (Australia) Adam Feeney (Australia) Greg Jones
- Score: 6–1, 6–3

Events
| Singles | Doubles |
| ← 2009 · | Comerica Bank Challenger | · 2011 → |

Carsten Ball and Chris Guccione are the defending champions. They successfully defended their title, defeating Adam Feeney and Greg Jones in the final 6–1, 6–3.

== Seeds ==
1. (Thailand) Sanchai Ratiwatana / (Thailand) Sonchat Ratiwatana (semifinals)
2. (Australia) Carsten Ball / (Australia) Chris Guccione (champions)
3. (Philippines) Treat Conrad Huey / (United Kingdom) Dominic Inglot (first round)
4. (Canada) Pierre-Ludovic Duclos / (Russia) Artem Sitak (quarterfinals)

== Draw ==
=== Key ===
- Q = Qualifier
- WC = Wild card
- LL = Lucky loser
- Alt = Alternate
- SE = Special exempt
- PR = Protected ranking
- ITF = ITF entry
- JE = Junior exempt
- w/o = Walkover
- r = Retired
- d = Defaulted
- SR = Special ranking

=== Draw ===
First round
1 | (Thailand) Sa Ratiwatana (Thailand) So Ratiwatana | 6 | 6
WC | (South Africa) M Fawcett (United States) J Kepler | 3 | 3
WC | (United States) C Buchanan (United States) B Klahn | 6 | 6
(Slovakia) K Beck (Ukraine) S Bubka | 4 | 2
4 | (Canada) P-L Duclos (Russia) A Sitak | 6 | 6
(United Kingdom) A Bogdanovic (United States) T Smyczek | 3 | 4
(Australia) A Feeney (Australia) G Jones | 6 | 6
(South Africa) R Klaasen (South Africa) I van der Merwe | 3 | 4
(Serbia) I Bozoljac (United States) K Kim | 6 | 3 | [6]
WC | (United States) D Britton (United States) D Young | 4 | 6 | [10]
Q | (United States) JP Fruttero (Australia) B Klein | 2 | 6 | [10]
3 | (Philippines) TC Huey (United Kingdom) D Inglot | 6 | 3 | [4]
(Canada) P Polansky (Canada) M Raonic | 7 | 6
(Denmark) F Nielsen (Australia) J Sirianni | 6^{10} | 4
(United States) A Kuznetsov (United States) R Ram | 3 | 1
2 | (Australia) C Ball (Australia) C Guccione | 6 | 6

Quarterfinals
1 | (Thailand) Sa Ratiwatana (Thailand) So Ratiwatana | 7 | 5 | [10]
WC | (United States) C Buchanan (United States) B Klahn | 6^{3} | 7 | [8]
4 | (Canada) P-L Duclos (Russia) A Sitak | 4 | 5
(Australia) A Feeney (Australia) G Jones | 6 | 7
WC | (United States) D Britton (United States) D Young | 4 | 7 | [11]
Q | (United States) JP Fruttero (Australia) B Klein | 6 | 5 | [9]
(Canada) P Polansky (Canada) M Raonic | 6^{4} | 2
2 | (Australia) C Ball (Australia) C Guccione | 7 | 6

Semifinals
1 | (Thailand) Sa Ratiwatana (Thailand) So Ratiwatana | 2 | 3
(Australia) A Feeney (Australia) G Jones | 6 | 6
WC | (United States) D Britton (United States) D Young | 2 | 4
2 | (Australia) C Ball (Australia) C Guccione | 6 | 6

Finals
(Australia) A Feeney (Australia) G Jones | 1 | 3
2 | (Australia) C Ball (Australia) C Guccione | 6 | 6
