= 2016 Nordic Naturals Challenger – Singles =

Singles
- 2016 Nordic Naturals Challenger

Final
- Champion: (United Kingdom) Daniel Evans
- Runner-up: (United Kingdom) Cameron Norrie
- Score: 6–3, 6–4

Events
Singles	Doubles
- Nordic Naturals Challenger

John Millman was the defending champion but chose not to defend his title.

Daniel Evans won the title after defeating Cameron Norrie 6–3, 6–4 in the final.

== Seeds ==
1. (United Kingdom) Daniel Evans (champion)
2. (Japan) Yoshihito Nishioka (first round)
3. (United States) Bjorn Fratangelo (semifinals)
4. (United States) Stefan Kozlov (first round)
5. (India) Ramkumar Ramanathan (first round)
6. (United States) Ernesto Escobedo (second round)
7. (Uzbekistan) Farrukh Dustov (first round)
8. (United States) Daniel Nguyen (withdrew)
9. (United States) Mitchell Krueger (second round)

== Draw ==
Key

- Q = Qualifier
- WC = Wild card
- LL = Lucky loser
- Alt = Alternate
- ITF = ITF entry
- PR = Protected ranking
- SR = Special ranking
- SE = Special exempt
- JE = Junior exempt
- JR = Junior Accelerator Programme entrant
- CO = College Accelerator Programme entrant
- NG = Next Gen Accelerator Program entrant
- w/o = Walkover
- r = Retired
- d = Defaulted

=== Finals ===
Semifinals
1	(United Kingdom) Daniel Evans	6	6
3	(United States) Bjorn Fratangelo	3	3
Q	(United States) Eric Quigley	6	2	4
Q	(United Kingdom) Cameron Norrie	3	6	6

Final
1	(United Kingdom) Daniel Evans	6	6
Q	(United Kingdom) Cameron Norrie	3	4

=== Top half ===
First round
1	(United Kingdom) D Evans	6	6
WC	(United States) T Fawcett	2	2
(Ecuador) E Gómez	6	6
(Australia) M Reid	3	4
(United States) N Meister	6	5	5
(Republic of Ireland) J McGee	4	7	7
(United Kingdom) L Broady	2	4
9	(United States) M Krueger	6	6
3	(United States) B Fratangelo	6	7^{7}
(United States) A Kuznetsov	2	6^{4}
Q	(United States) John Lamble	3	4
WC	(United States) C Thompson	6	6
(Australia) D Kelly	3	1
(Australia) B Mitchell	6	6
(Australia) M Matosevic	6	6
7	(Uzbekistan) F Dustov	1	0

Second round
1	(United Kingdom) D Evans	6	6^{5}	6
(Ecuador) E Gómez	4	7^{7}	1
(Republic of Ireland) J McGee	6	6
9	(United States) M Krueger	3	1
3	(United States) B Fratangelo	6	7
WC	(United States) C Thompson	3	5
(Australia) B Mitchell	2	1
(Australia) M Matosevic	6	6

Quarterfinals
1	(United Kingdom) D Evans	6	6
(Republic of Ireland) J McGee	3	4
3	(United States) B Fratangelo	6	6
(Australia) M Matosevic	4	2

Semifinals
1	(United Kingdom) D Evans	6	6
3	(United States) B Fratangelo	3	3

=== Bottom half ===
First round
6	(United States) E Escobedo	6	6
(Japan) Y Uchiyama	3	4
Q	(United States) R Sarmiento	6	6
(United Kingdom) L Glasspool	3	2
Q	(United States) E Quigley	6	6
WC	(United States) C Eubanks	2	1
WC	(United States) M McDonald	6	6
4	(United States) S Kozlov	1	4
5	(India) R Ramanathan	3	6^{8}
Q	(United Kingdom) C Norrie	6	7^{10}
(South Africa) N Scholtz	3	3
(United States) S Bangoura	6	6
(Italy) Erik Crepaldi	7	7
LL	(United States) A Halebian	5	5
(United States) E King	6	7
2	(Japan) Y Nishioka	4	5

Second round
6	(United States) E Escobedo	2	2
Q	(United States) R Sarmiento	6	6
Q	(United States) E Quigley	5	6	6
WC	(United States) M McDonald	7	4	2
Q	(United Kingdom) C Norrie	7^{7}	7^{7}
(United States) S Bangoura	6^{3}	6^{4}
(Italy) E Crepaldi	3	5
(United States) E King	6	7

Quarterfinals
Q	(United States) R Sarmiento	5	2
Q	(United States) E Quigley	7	6
Q	(United Kingdom) C Norrie	6	4	6
(United States) E King	3	6	4

Semifinals
Q	(United States) E Quigley	6	2	4
Q	(United Kingdom) C Norrie	3	6	6
