= 2012 Comerica Bank Challenger – Doubles =

Professional tennis doubles tournament

Doubles
- 2012 Comerica Bank Challenger

Final
- Champions: (South Africa) Rik de Voest (Australia) John Peers
- Runners-up: (Australia) Chris Guccione (Germany) Frank Moser
- Score: 6–7^{(5–7)}, 6–1, [10–4]

Events
Singles	Doubles
← 2011 ·	Comerica Bank Challenger	· 2013 →

Carsten Ball and Chris Guccione were the defending champions; however, Ball chose not to compete. Guccione competed with Frank Moser.
Rik de Voest and John Peers won the title, defeating Guccione and Moser 6–7^{(5–7)}, 6–1, [10–4] in the final.

== Seeds ==
1. (South Africa) Raven Klaasen / (South Africa) Izak van der Merwe (first round)
2. (Australia) Chris Guccione / (Germany) Frank Moser (final)
3. (South Africa) Rik de Voest / (Australia) John Peers (champions)
4. (Colombia) Robert Farah / (Colombia) Carlos Salamanca (semifinals)

== Draw ==
=== Key ===
- Q = Qualifier
- WC = Wild card
- LL = Lucky loser
- Alt = Alternate
- SE = Special exempt
- PR = Protected ranking
- ITF = ITF entry
- JE = Junior exempt
- w/o = Walkover
- r = Retired
- d = Defaulted
- SR = Special ranking

=== Draw ===
First round
1	(South Africa) R Klaasen (South Africa) I van der Merwe	3	0
(United States) D Britton (United States) A Krajicek	6	6
(Romania) M Copil (Argentina) G Pella	6	6
WC	(United States) Jordan Bridge (United States) Jordan Kepler	1	4
3	(South Africa) R de Voest (Australia) J Peers	2	6	[10]
(Australia) C Ebelthite (Australia) M Reid	6	3	[6]
(Chinese Taipei) J Wang (Chinese Taipei) T-h Yang	4	2
(Brazil) F Romboli (Israel) A Weintraub	6	6
LL	(Bulgaria) Boris Bakalov (Moldova) R Borvanov	w/o
(Russia) D Tursunov (Germany) M Zverev
Q	(Israel) Harel Srugo (Brazil) P Zerbini	5	2
4	(Colombia) R Farah (Colombia) C Salamanca	7	6
WC	(United States) D Lajola (United States) M McClune	4	6	[7]
(United States) B Baker (United States) JP Fruttero	6	3	[10]
WC	(United States) C Buchanan (United States) B Klahn	7^{7}	3	[3]
2	(Australia) C Guccione (Germany) F Moser	6^{2}	6	[10]

Quarterfinals
(United States) D Britton (United States) A Krajicek	6	6
(Romania) M Copil (Argentina) G Pella	4	4
3	(South Africa) R de Voest (Australia) J Peers	6	5	[10]
(Brazil) F Romboli (Israel) A Weintraub	4	7	[2]
LL	(Bulgaria) Boris Bakalov (Moldova) R Borvanov	3	7^{7}	[4]
4	(Colombia) R Farah (Colombia) C Salamanca	6	6^{1}	[10]
(United States) B Baker (United States) JP Fruttero
2	(Australia) C Guccione (Germany) F Moser	w/o

Semifinals
(United States) D Britton (United States) A Krajicek	6^{3}	6^{5}
3	(South Africa) R de Voest (Australia) J Peers	7^{7}	7^{7}
4	(Colombia) R Farah (Colombia) C Salamanca	1	4
2	(Australia) C Guccione (Germany) F Moser	6	6

Final
3	(South Africa) R de Voest (Australia) J Peers	6^{5}	6	[10]
2	(Australia) C Guccione (Germany) F Moser	7^{7}	1	[4]
