= 2019 Nordic Naturals Challenger – Doubles =

Doubles
- 2019 Nordic Naturals Challenger

Final
- Champions: (El Salvador) Marcelo Arévalo (Mexico) Miguel Ángel Reyes-Varela
- Runners-up: (United States) Nathan Pasha (United States) Max Schnur
- Score: 5–7, 6–3, [10–8]

Events
Singles	Doubles
← 2018 ·	Nordic Naturals Challenger	· 2020 →

Thanasi Kokkinakis and Matt Reid were the defending champions but only Reid chose to defend his title, partnering Jonny O'Mara. Reid lost in the first round to Egor Gerasimov and Li Zhe.

Marcelo Arévalo and Miguel Ángel Reyes-Varela won the title after defeating Nathan Pasha and Max Schnur 5–7, 6–3, [10–8] in the final.

== Seeds ==
1. (El Salvador) Marcelo Arévalo / (Mexico) Miguel Ángel Reyes-Varela (champions)
2. (United Kingdom) Jonny O'Mara / (Australia) Matt Reid (first round)
3. (India) Leander Paes / (Australia) Max Purcell (withdrew)
4. (United States) James Cerretani / (Israel) Jonathan Erlich (quarterfinals)

== Draw ==
=== Key ===
- Q = Qualifier
- WC = Wild card
- LL = Lucky loser
- Alt = Alternate
- ITF = ITF entry
- PR = Protected ranking
- SR = Special ranking
- SE = Special exempt
- JE = Junior exempt
- JR = Junior Accelerator Programme entrant
- CO = College Accelerator Programme entrant
- NG = Next Gen Accelerator Program entrant
- w/o = Walkover
- r = Retired
- d = Defaulted

First round
1	(El Salvador) M Arévalo (Mexico) MÁ Reyes-Varela	6	3	[14]
WC	(United States) D Novikov (United States) D Young	2	6	[12]
(United States) N Monroe (United States) J Withrow	6^{7}	4
(Sweden) A Göransson (United States) H Reese	7^{9}	6
4	(United States) J Cerretani (Israel) J Erlich	6	6
WC	(United States) M Cressy (United States) K Smith	3	1
WC	(United States) JC Aragone (United States) B Holt	4	7^{10}	[7]
(United States) N Lammons (United States) A Lawson	6	6^{8}	[10]
ITF	(Colombia) A Gómez (United States) JA Ore	7^{7}	3	[7]
(Belgium) R Bemelmans (Sweden) R Lindstedt	6^{5}	6	[10]
(Mexico) H Hach Verdugo (Netherlands) S Verbeek	4	1
Alt/PR	(United States) N Pasha (United States) M Schnur	6	6
ITF	(United Kingdom) E Hoyt (Portugal) B Saraiva	5	6	[11]
(United States) M Giron (Germany) D Köpfer	7	4	[9]
(Belarus) E Gerasimov (China) Z Li	6	6
2	(United Kingdom) J O'Mara (Australia) M Reid	2	4

Quarterfinals
1	(El Salvador) M Arévalo (Mexico) MÁ Reyes-Varela	7^{7}	6
(Sweden) A Göransson (United States) H Reese	6^{4}	3
4	(United States) J Cerretani (Israel) J Erlich	3	3
(United States) N Lammons (United States) A Lawson	6	6
(Belgium) R Bemelmans (Sweden) R Lindstedt	5	6^{7}
Alt/PR	(United States) N Pasha (United States) M Schnur	7	7^{9}
ITF	(United Kingdom) E Hoyt (Portugal) B Saraiva	6	4	[11]
(Belarus) E Gerasimov (China) Z Li	3	6	[9]

Semifinals
1	(El Salvador) M Arévalo (Mexico) MÁ Reyes-Varela	5	6	[10]
(United States) N Lammons (United States) A Lawson	7	3	[8]
Alt/PR	(United States) N Pasha (United States) M Schnur	6	6
ITF	(United Kingdom) E Hoyt (Portugal) B Saraiva	3	4

Final
1	(El Salvador) M Arévalo (Mexico) MÁ Reyes-Varela	5	6	[10]
Alt/PR	(United States) N Pasha (United States) M Schnur	7	3	[8]
