= 2010 Comerica Bank Challenger – Singles =

Singles
- 2010 Comerica Bank Challenger

Final
- Champion: (Australia) Marinko Matosevic
- Runner-up: (United States) Donald Young
- Score: 6–4, 6–2

Events
Singles	Doubles
← 2009 ·	Comerica Bank Challenger	· 2011 →

Following are the results of the 2010 Comerica Bank Challenger singles. The 2010 Comerica Bank Challenger was a professional tennis tournament played on hard court. This was the twenty-third edition of the tournament which is part of the 2010 ATP Challenger Tour. It took place in Aptos, United States between 12 July and 18 July 2010.

Chris Guccione was the defending champion, but he lost to Izak van der Merwe in the first round.
Marinko Matosevic won the tournament after he defeated Donald Young in the final 6–4, 6–2.

== Seeds ==
1. (United States) Rajeev Ram (first round)
2. (India) Somdev Devvarman (semifinals)
3. (United States) Donald Young (final)
4. (Australia) Carsten Ball (semifinals)
5. (Serbia) Ilija Bozoljac (quarterfinals)
6. (United States) Kevin Kim (first round)
7. (United Kingdom) Alex Bogdanovic (quarterfinals)
8. (United States) Tim Smyczek (first round)

== Draw ==
=== Key ===
- Q = Qualifier
- WC = Wild card
- LL = Lucky loser
- Alt = Alternate
- SE = Special exempt
- PR = Protected ranking
- ITF = ITF entry
- JE = Junior exempt
- w/o = Walkover
- r = Retired
- d = Defaulted
- SR = Special ranking

=== Finals ===
Semifinals
(Australia) Marinko Matosevic	6	6
4	(Australia) Carsten Ball	4	4
3	(United States) Donald Young	6	3	6
2	(India) Somdev Devvarman	2	6	4

Final
(Australia) Marinko Matosevic	6	6
3	(United States) Donald Young	4	2

=== Top half ===
First round
1	(United States) R Ram	1	1
(Australia) M Matosevic	6	6
(South Africa) I van der Merwe	3	6	6
(Australia) C Guccione	6	3	4
(United States) M Yani	0	2
(Germany) S Stadler	6	6
(Australia) N Lindahl	6	6
8	(United States) T Smyczek	2	2
4	(Australia) C Ball	7	6
(Australia) J Sirianni	6^{7}	4
(United States) A Kuznetsov	1	6	6
Q	(Australia) Dayne Kelly	6	3	4
Q	(Australia) B Klein	7	3	6
WC	(United States) D Britton	5	6	4
(Canada) P Polansky	6	6
6	(United States) K Kim	1	1

Second round
(Australia) M Matosevic	6	6
(South Africa) I van der Merwe	4	4
(Germany) S Stadler	6	6
(Australia) N Lindahl	3	2
4	(Australia) C Ball	6^{6}	6	6
(United States) A Kuznetsov	7	1	4
Q	(Australia) B Klein	6	6
(Canada) P Polansky	3	4

Quarterfinals
(Australia) M Matosevic	6	7
(Germany) S Stadler	4	6^{4}
4	(Australia) C Ball	6	7
Q	(Australia) B Klein	1	6^{4}

Semifinals
(Australia) M Matosevic	6	6
4	(Australia) C Ball	4	4

=== Bottom half ===
First round
5	(Serbia) I Bozoljac	6	7
WC	(United States) C Buchanan	0	6^{2}
(Canada) M Raonic	6	6
WC	(United States) Daniel Kosakowski	3	3
(Japan) T Suzuki	4	3
Q	(Russia) A Sitak	6	6
(Australia) G Jones	6	1	2
3	(United States) D Young	3	6	6
7	(United Kingdom) A Bogdanovic	6	6
SE	(United Kingdom) R Bloomfield	3	4
(Denmark) F Nielsen	6^{5}	2
Q	(Slovakia) K Beck	7	6
WC	(United States) B Klahn	2	0
(United States) A Bogomolov Jr.	6	6
(Japan) Y Sugita	7	2	0
2	(India) S Devvarman	5	6	6

Second round
5	(Serbia) I Bozoljac	3	6	6
(Canada) M Raonic	6	3	2
Q	(Russia) A Sitak	6	4	4
3	(United States) D Young	1	6	6
7	(United Kingdom) A Bogdanovic
Q	(Slovakia) K Beck	w/o
(United States) A Bogomolov Jr.	2	7	3
2	(India) S Devvarman	6	5	6

Quarterfinals
5	(Serbia) I Bozoljac	3	4
3	(United States) D Young	6	6
7	(United Kingdom) A Bogdanovic	5	6	0
2	(India) S Devvarman	7	4	6

Semifinals
3	(United States) D Young	6	3	6
2	(India) S Devvarman	2	6	4
