= 2012 Comerica Bank Challenger =

- Date: 6–12 August
- Edition: 25th
- Location: Aptos, California, United States

Champions

Singles
- (United States) Steve Johnson

Doubles
- (South Africa) Rik de Voest / (Australia) John Peers
← 2011 ·	Comerica Bank Challenger	· 2013 →

The 2012 Comerica Bank Challenger was a professional tennis tournament played on hard courts. It was the 24th edition of the tournament which was part of the 2012 ATP Challenger Tour. It took place in Aptos, California, United States between 6 and 12 August July 2012.

== Singles main-draw entrants ==
=== Seeds ===
Country	Player	Rank^{1}	Seed
USA	Brian Baker	62	1
RUS	Igor Andreev	92	2
USA	Rajeev Ram	93	3
NED	Igor Sijsling	102	4
GER	Tobias Kamke	107	5
FRA	Florent Serra	132	6
RSA	Izak van der Merwe	152	7
USA	Denis Kudla	164	8

- ^{1} Rankings are as of July 30, 2012.

=== Other entrants ===
The following players received wildcards into the singles main draw:

- (United States) Brian Baker
- (United States) Robby Ginepri
- (United States) Steve Johnson
- (United States) Bradley Klahn

The following players received entry from the qualifying draw:

- (Serbia) Ilija Bozoljac
- (United States) Jeff Dadamo
- (Australia) Matt Reid
- (Russia) Dmitry Tursunov

== Champions ==
=== Singles ===
- (United States) Steve Johnson def. (Colombia) Robert Farah, 6–3, 6–3

=== Doubles ===
- (South Africa) Rik de Voest / (Australia) John Peers def. (Australia) Chris Guccione / (Germany) Frank Moser, 6–7^{(5–7)}, 6–1, [10–4]
