= 2019 Nordic Naturals Challenger – Singles =

Singles
- 2019 Nordic Naturals Challenger

Final
- Champion: (United States) Steve Johnson
- Runner-up: (Germany) Dominik Köpfer
- Score: 6–4, 7–6^{(7–4)}

Events
| Singles | Doubles |
| ← 2018 · | Nordic Naturals Challenger | · 2020 → |

Thanasi Kokkinakis was the defending champion but lost in the second round to Egor Gerasimov.

Steve Johnson won the title after defeating Dominik Köpfer 6–4, 7–6^{(7–4)} in the final.

== Seeds ==
All seeds receive a bye into the second round.

1. (Bosnia and Herzegovina) Damir Džumhur (quarterfinals)
2. (United States) Steve Johnson (champion)
3. (Japan) Taro Daniel (quarterfinals)
4. (Germany) Dominik Köpfer (final)
5. (United States) Bjorn Fratangelo (third round)
6. (Belarus) Egor Gerasimov (semifinals)
7. (United States) Marcos Giron (quarterfinals)
8. (United States) Michael Mmoh (second round)
9. (France) Enzo Couacaud (second round)
10. (Japan) Go Soeda (quarterfinals)
11. (United States) Mitchell Krueger (second round)
12. (Ecuador) Emilio Gómez (third round)
13. (United States) Christopher Eubanks (second round)
14. (India) Ramkumar Ramanathan (second round)
15. (Barbados) Darian King (withdrew)
16. (Belgium) Ruben Bemelmans (second round)

== Draw ==
=== Key ===
- Q = Qualifier
- WC = Wild card
- LL = Lucky loser
- Alt = Alternate
- SE = Special exempt
- PR = Protected ranking
- ITF = ITF entry
- JE = Junior exempt
- w/o = Walkover
- r = Retired
- d = Defaulted
- SR = Special ranking

=== Finals ===
Quarterfinals
1 | (Bosnia and Herzegovina) Damir Džumhur | 1 | 6 | 5
(United States) Ernesto Escobedo | 6 | 3 | 7
4 | (Germany) Dominik Köpfer | 6 | 6
7 | (United States) Marcos Giron | 1 | 4
6 | (Belarus) Egor Gerasimov | 6 | 6
3 | (Japan) Taro Daniel | 3 | 4
10 | (Japan) Go Soeda | 3 | 6^{4}
2 | (United States) Steve Johnson | 6 | 7^{7}

Semifinals
(United States) Ernesto Escobedo | 4 | 3
4 | (Germany) Dominik Köpfer | 6 | 6
6 | (Belarus) Egor Gerasimov | 2 | 1
2 | (United States) Steve Johnson | 6 | 6

Final
4 | (Germany) Dominik Köpfer | 4 | 6^{4}
2 | (United States) Steve Johnson | 6 | 7^{7}

=== Top half ===
==== Section 1 ====
First round
Q | (United States) K Smith | 6 | 6
WC | (United States) B Holt | 4 | 3
WC | (United States) D Young | 4 | 2
(Slovakia) L Lacko | 6 | 6
(United States) E Escobedo | 6 | 6
WC | (United States) J Brooksby | 2 | 2
LL | (Netherlands) S Verbeek | 6 | 6^{3} | 2
(Italy) J Sinner | 3 | 7^{7} | 6

Second round
1 | (Bosnia and Herzegovina) D Džumhur | 6 | 6
Q | (United States) K Smith | 4 | 4
(Slovakia) L Lacko | 7^{7} | 7^{7}
13 | (United States) C Eubanks | 6^{1} | 6^{5}
11 | (United States) M Krueger | 4 | 7^{8} | 2
(United States) E Escobedo | 6 | 6^{6} | 6
(Italy) J Sinner | 6^{6} | 3
5 | (United States) B Fratangelo | 7^{8} | 6

Third round
1 | (Bosnia and Herzegovina) D Džumhur | 6^{6} | 6 | 7^{11}
(Slovakia) L Lacko | 7^{8} | 3 | 6^{9}
(United States) E Escobedo | 7^{7} | 6^{5} | 7^{14}
5 | (United States) B Fratangelo | 6^{2} | 7^{7} | 6^{12}

Quarterfinals
1 | (Bosnia and Herzegovina) D Džumhur | 1 | 6 | 5
(United States) E Escobedo | 6 | 3 | 7

==== Section 2 ====
First round
(United Kingdom) J Ward | 4 | 2
(China) Z Li | 6 | 6
WC | (United States) R Harrison | 4^{r}
Alt | (United States) A Sarkissian | 5
(Croatia) B Gojo | 6 | 6
(El Salvador) M Arévalo | 4 | 1
ITF | (United Kingdom) L Glasspool | 6^{5} | 4
ITF | (United States) Ma Redlicki | 7^{7} | 6

Second round
4 | (Germany) D Köpfer | 6 | 6
(China) Z Li | 3 | 4
Alt | (United States) A Sarkissian | 6^{2} | 6 | 6
16 | (Belgium) R Bemelmans | 7^{7} | 1 | 2
9 | (France) E Couacaud | 6 | 2 | 2
(Croatia) B Gojo | 1 | 6 | 6
ITF | (United States) Ma Redlicki | 2 | 3
7 | (United States) M Giron | 6 | 6

Third round
4 | (Germany) D Köpfer | 6 | 7^{7}
Alt | (United States) A Sarkissian | 3 | 6^{2}
(Croatia) B Gojo | 6 | 6^{2} | 4
7 | (United States) M Giron | 3 | 7^{7} | 6

Quarterfinals
4 | (Germany) D Köpfer | 6 | 6
7 | (United States) M Giron | 1 | 4

=== Bottom half ===
==== Section 3 ====
First round
(Australia) T Kokkinakis | 6 | 1
Q | (Ukraine) V Uzhylovskyi | 2 | 0^{r}
(Australia) A Santillan | 6 | 6
ITF | (Netherlands) T van Rijthoven | 3 | 4
(France) M Janvier | 6 | 4 | 6
(South Korea) D-h Lee | 4 | 6 | 4
WC | (United States) S Riffice | 6 | 6
(Japan) Yo Watanuki | 2 | 4

Second round
6 | (Belarus) E Gerasimov | 7^{7} | 6
(Australia) T Kokkinakis | 6^{2} | 4
(Australia) A Santillan | 6^{4} | 5
12 | (Ecuador) E Gómez | 7^{7} | 7
Alt | (United States) Mi Redlicki | 6 | 6
(France) M Janvier | 3 | 4
WC | (United States) S Riffice | 4 | 0
3 | (Japan) T Daniel | 6 | 6

Third round
6 | (Belarus) E Gerasimov | 6 | 7
12 | (Ecuador) E Gómez | 3 | 5
Alt | (United States) Mi Redlicki | 6 | 5 | 6^{3}
3 | (Japan) T Daniel | 3 | 7 | 7^{7}

Quarterfinals
6 | (Belarus) E Gerasimov | 6 | 6
3 | (Japan) T Daniel | 3 | 4

==== Section 4 ====
First round
(Australia) M Purcell | 7 | 7^{9}
ITF | (United States) M Cressy | 5 | 6^{7}
(United States) JC Aragone | 4 | 2
ITF | (United Kingdom) E Hoyt | 6 | 6
Alt | (United States) D Novikov | 2 | 6 | 0
(United Kingdom) L Broady | 6 | 4 | 6
(Ecuador) R Quiroz | 6 | 6
(Australia) A Harris | 3 | 3

Second round
8 | (United States) M Mmoh | 5 | 6 | 4
(Australia) M Purcell | 7 | 1 | 6
ITF | (United Kingdom) E Hoyt | 6^{3} | 5
10 | (Japan) G Soeda | 7^{7} | 7
14 | (India) R Ramanathan | 6^{2} | 4
(United Kingdom) L Broady | 7^{7} | 6
(Ecuador) R Quiroz | 1 | 2
2 | (United States) S Johnson | 6 | 6

Third round
(Australia) M Purcell | 6^{3} | 3
10 | (Japan) G Soeda | 7^{7} | 6
(United Kingdom) L Broady | 5 | 1
2 | (United States) S Johnson | 7 | 6

Quarterfinals
10 | (Japan) G Soeda | 3 | 6^{4}
2 | (United States) S Johnson | 6 | 7^{7}
