= 2014 Comerica Bank Challenger – Singles =

Singles
- 2014 Comerica Bank Challenger

Final
- Champion: (Cyprus) Marcos Baghdatis
- Runner-up: (Kazakhstan) Mikhail Kukushkin
- Score: 7–6^{(9–7)}, 6–4

Events
Singles	Doubles
← 2013 ·	Comerica Bank Challenger	· 2015 →

Marcos Baghdatis won the title, beating Mikhail Kukushkin 7–6^{(9–7)}, 6–4

== Seeds ==
1. (Kazakhstan) Mikhail Kukushkin (final)
2. (Cyprus) Marcos Baghdatis (champion)
3. (Russia) Evgeny Donskoy (second round)
4. (Japan) Go Soeda (semifinals)
5. (India) Somdev Devvarman (quarterfinals)
6. (Croatia) Ante Pavić (second round)
7. (Uzbekistan) Farrukh Dustov (second round)
8. (Hungary) Márton Fucsovics (quarterfinals)

== Draw ==
=== Key ===
- Q = Qualifier
- WC = Wild card
- LL = Lucky loser
- Alt = Alternate
- SE = Special exempt
- PR = Protected ranking
- ITF = ITF entry
- JE = Junior exempt
- w/o = Walkover
- r = Retired
- d = Defaulted
- SR = Special ranking

=== Finals ===
Semifinals
1	(Kazakhstan) Mikhail Kukushkin	6	6
(United States) Rhyne Williams	2	2
4	(Japan) Go Soeda	4	2
2	(Cyprus) Marcos Baghdatis	6	6

Final
1	(Kazakhstan) Mikhail Kukushkin	6^{7}	4
2	(Cyprus) Marcos Baghdatis	7^{9}	6

=== Top half ===
First round
1	(Kazakhstan) M Kukushkin	6	6
Q	(Japan) Y Uchiyama	2	3
(United Kingdom) J Ward	3	6	7
(Ecuador) E Gómez	6	3	5
(United States) C Buchanan	4	5
(China) Z Zhang	6	7
(Australia) J-P Smith	6^{2}	5
5	(India) S Devvarman	7^{7}	7
3	(Russia) E Donskoy	6	5	7
Q	(India) S Singh	4	7	5
(Argentina) JI Londero	6	6
(Russia) A Bogomolov Jr.	3	1
WC	(United States) K King	6	4	3
(United States) R Williams	0	6	6
Q	(United States) Dennis Nevolo	3	4
7	(Uzbekistan) F Dustov	6	6

Second round
1	(Kazakhstan) M Kukushkin	6	6
(United Kingdom) J Ward	3	4
(China) Z Zhang	7^{7}	6^{6}	5
5	(India) S Devvarman	6^{4}	7^{8}	7
3	(Russia) E Donskoy	4	2
(Argentina) JI Londero	6	6
(United States) R Williams	6	7^{7}
7	(Uzbekistan) F Dustov	4	6^{4}

Quarterfinals
1	(Kazakhstan) M Kukushkin	7	4	6
5	(India) S Devvarman	5	6	2
(Argentina) JI Londero	6	2	1
(United States) R Williams	3	6	6

Semifinals
1	(Kazakhstan) M Kukushkin	6	6
(United States) R Williams	2	2

=== Bottom half ===
First round
8	(Hungary) M Fucsovics	6	6
WC	(United States) M McDonald	4	2
(Ukraine) I Marchenko	3	7	1
Alt	(China) D Wu	6	5	6
(United States) A Kuznetsov	7^{7}	6
(United States) A Krajicek	6^{2}	4
(Chile) G Lama	6^{5}	3
4	(Japan) G Soeda	7^{7}	6
6	(Croatia) A Pavić	3	7^{8}	6
WC	(United States) M Giron	6	6^{6}	3
(Japan) T Daniel	4	2
(Belgium) R Bemelmans	6	6
(Argentina) A Collarini	4	6	6
Q	(United States) D Nguyen	6	3	4
WC	(United States) Andre Dome	1	3
2	(Cyprus) M Baghdatis	6	6

Second round
8	(Hungary) M Fucsovics	6	6
Alt	(China) D Wu	0	3
(United States) A Kuznetsov	3	4
4	(Japan) G Soeda	6	6
6	(Croatia) A Pavić	2	6^{2}
(Belgium) R Bemelmans	6	7^{7}
(Argentina) A Collarini	1	1
2	(Cyprus) M Baghdatis	6	6

Quarterfinals
8	(Hungary) M Fucsovics	2	3
4	(Japan) G Soeda	6	6
(Belgium) R Bemelmans	3	4
2	(Cyprus) M Baghdatis	6	6

Semifinals
4	(Japan) G Soeda	4	2
2	(Cyprus) M Baghdatis	6	6
