= 2013 Comerica Bank Challenger – Singles =

Singles
- 2013 Comerica Bank Challenger

Final
- Champion: (United States) Bradley Klahn
- Runner-up: (United Kingdom) Dan Evans
- Score: 3–6, 7–6^{(7–5)}, 6–4

Events
Singles	Doubles
← 2012 ·	Comerica Bank Challenger	· 2014 →

Steve Johnson was the defending champion, but lost to Donald Young in the first round.
Bradley Klahn won the title over Dan Evans 3–6, 7–6^{(7–5)}, 6–4

== Seeds ==
1. (Argentina) Guido Pella (quarterfinals)
2. (Russia) Evgeny Donskoy (semifinals)
3. (United States) Steve Johnson (first round)
4. (United States) Ryan Harrison (first round)
5. (United States) Wayne Odesnik (quarterfinals)
6. (United States) Bobby Reynolds (first round)
7. (Germany) Mischa Zverev (quarterfinals)
8. (Chinese Taipei) Jimmy Wang (second round)

== Main draw ==
=== Key ===
- Q = Qualifier
- WC = Wild card
- LL = Lucky loser
- Alt = Alternate
- ITF = ITF entry
- PR = Protected ranking
- SR = Special ranking
- SE = Special exempt
- JE = Junior exempt
- JR = Junior Accelerator Programme entrant
- CO = College Accelerator Programme entrant
- NG = Next Gen Accelerator Program entrant
- w/o = Walkover
- r = Retired
- d = Defaulted

=== Finals ===
Semifinals
SE	(United Kingdom) Dan Evans	7^{7}	6
Q	(Uzbekistan) Farrukh Dustov	6^{2}	3
(United States) Bradley Klahn	7^{7}	5	6
2	(Russia) Evgeny Donskoy	6^{1}	7	4

Final
SE	(United Kingdom) Dan Evans	6	6^{5}	4
(United States) Bradley Klahn	3	7^{7}	6

=== Top half ===
First round
1	(Argentina) G Pella	6	6
(Tunisia) M Jaziri	4	2
(Australia) J Duckworth	6	4	1
(United States) B Baker	4	6	6
WC	(United States) M Krueger	1	2
SE	(United Kingdom) D Evans	6	6
SE	(Australia) G Jones	0	0
8	(Chinese Taipei) J Wang	6	6
4	(United States) R Harrison	3	6	5
Q	(Republic of Ireland) J McGee	6	3	7
Q	(Uzbekistan) F Dustov	6	7
(Belgium) O Rochus	4	5
(Belgium) M Authom	1	4
WC	(United States) T Sandgren	6	6
(Japan) Y Sugita	7	6
6	(United States) B Reynolds	5	2

Second round
1	(Argentina) G Pella	6	6
(United States) B Baker	4	4
SE	(United Kingdom) D Evans	2	6	6
8	(Chinese Taipei) J Wang	6	4	3
Q	(Republic of Ireland) J McGee	2	1
Q	(Uzbekistan) F Dustov	6	6
WC	(United States) T Sandgren	4	6	6
(Japan) Y Sugita	6	3	4

Quarterfinals
1	(Argentina) G Pella	5	1
SE	(United Kingdom) D Evans	7	6
Q	(Uzbekistan) F Dustov	7^{7}	3	6
WC	(United States) T Sandgren	6^{5}	6	0

Semifinals
SE	(United Kingdom) D Evans	7^{7}	6
Q	(Uzbekistan) F Dustov	6^{2}	3

=== Bottom half ===
First round
5	(United States) W Odesnik	6	6^{4}	6
LL	(United Kingdom) J Ward	3	7^{7}	4
Q	(Ukraine) D Molchanov	6	6
(Japan) H Moriya	4	2
(United States) B Klahn	7^{7}	6
(Japan) T Ito	6^{5}	3
(United States) D Young	2	6	7^{7}
3	(United States) S Johnson	6	3	6^{3}
7	(Germany) M Zverev	4	6	6
(Kazakhstan) M Kukushkin	6	4	4
(Australia) M Reid	4	6	2
WC	(United States) D Novikov	6	2	6
WC	(United States) Andre Dome	6^{4}	4
(Belgium) R Bemelmans	7^{7}	6
Q	(Australia) J-P Smith	3	6	6^{4}
2	(Russia) E Donskoy	6	2	7^{7}

Second round
5	(United States) W Odesnik	6	6
Q	(Ukraine) D Molchanov	3	2
(United States) B Klahn	6	6
(United States) D Young	4	4
7	(Germany) M Zverev	7^{7}	6
WC	(United States) D Novikov	6^{5}	2
(Belgium) R Bemelmans	6	6^{4}	4
2	(Russia) E Donskoy	3	7^{7}	6

Quarterfinals
5	(United States) W Odesnik	5	6	2
(United States) B Klahn	7	4	6
7	(Germany) M Zverev	5	2
2	(Russia) E Donskoy	7	6

Semifinals
(United States) B Klahn	7^{7}	5	6
2	(Russia) E Donskoy	6^{1}	7	4
