= 2009 Comerica Bank Challenger – Singles =

Singles
- 2009 Comerica Bank Challenger

Final
- Champion: (Australia) Chris Guccione
- Runner-up: (Australia) Nick Lindahl
- Score: 6–3, 6–4

Events
Singles	Doubles
← 2008 ·	Comerica Bank Challenger	· 2010 →

Kevin Kim was the defending champion; however, he was eliminated by Takao Suzuki already in the first round.
Chris Guccione defeated Nick Lindahl in the final 6–3, 6–4.

== Seeds ==
1. (United States) Kevin Kim (first round)
2. (Italy) Flavio Cipolla (first round)
3. (United States) Wayne Odesnik (quarterfinals)
4. (Thailand) Danai Udomchoke (first round)
5. (France) Arnaud Clément (first round)
6. (India) Somdev Devvarman (semifinals)
7. (Australia) Chris Guccione (champion)
8. (United States) Donald Young (first round)

== Draw ==
=== Key ===
- Q = Qualifier
- WC = Wild card
- LL = Lucky loser
- Alt = Alternate
- SE = Special exempt
- PR = Protected ranking
- ITF = ITF entry
- JE = Junior exempt
- w/o = Walkover
- r = Retired
- d = Defaulted
- SR = Special ranking

=== Final four ===
Semifinals
Q	(Australia) Nick Lindahl	6	6
(United States) Michael Yani	3	2
7	(Australia) Chris Guccione	6	6
6	(India) Somdev Devvarman	2	1

Final
Q	(Australia) Nick Lindahl	3	4
7	(Australia) Chris Guccione	6	6

=== Top half ===
First round
1	(United States) K Kim	5	3
(Japan) T Suzuki	7	6
WC	(United States) P Simmonds	6^{10}	5
(South Korea) KT Im	7	7
Q	(Australia) N Lindahl	6^{4}	6	7
(United States) R Sweeting	7	4	6^{7}
(Italy) A Stoppini	6	6
8	(United States) D Young	4	4
4	(Thailand) D Udomchoke	4	6	3
(United States) M Yani	6	3	6
(United States) R DeHeart	3	6	6
(Australia) C Ball	6	1	4
(Australia) M Matosevic	6	6
WC	(United States) B Weston	4	4
(United States) A Bogomolov Jr.	6	3	7
5	(France) A Clément	4	6	6^{10}

Second round
Q	(Japan) T Suzuki	6^{1}	1
(South Korea) KT Im	7	6
Q	(Australia) N Lindahl	6	7
(Italy) A Stoppini	4	5
(United States) M Yani	6	6^{1}	7
(United States) R DeHeart	3	7	6^{2}
(Australia) M Matosevic	7	6
(United States) A Bogomolov Jr.	5	2

Quarterfinals
(South Korea) KT Im	3	3
Q	(Australia) N Lindahl	6	6
(United States) M Yani	6	6
(Australia) M Matosevic	4	4

Semifinals
Q	(Australia) N Lindahl	6	6
(United States) M Yani	3	2

=== Bottom half ===
First round
7	(Australia) C Guccione	6	7
(Japan) G Soeda	4	6^{5}
(Australia) S Groth	7	3	6^{2}
Q	(Japan) Y Sugita	5	6	7
(Belgium) X Malisse	6	6
(United States) T Widom	3	2
Q	(Germany) T Kamke	6	2	5
3	(United States) W Odesnik	1	6	7
6	(India) S Devvarman	7	6
WC	(United States) L Cook	6^{7}	2
(United States) S Jenkins	4	6	6^{1}
WC	(United States) A Kuznetsov	6	1	7
(South Africa) R de Voest	6^{6}	3	r
(South Africa) I van der Merwe	7	4
(Germany) S Stadler	7	7
2	(Italy) F Cipolla	6^{3}	5

Second round
7	(Australia) C Guccione	6	6
Q	(Japan) Y Sugita	2	3
(Belgium) X Malisse	4	6	5
3	(United States) W Odesnik	6	3	7
6	(India) S Devvarman	6	6
WC	(United States) A Kuznetsov	1	3
(South Africa) I van der Merwe	6	6
(Germany) S Stadler	3	4

Quarterfinals
7	(Australia) C Guccione	7	2	7
3	(United States) W Odesnik	6^{5}	6	6^{2}
6	(India) S Devvarman	6	6
(South Africa) I van der Merwe	4	2

Semifinals
7	(Australia) C Guccione	6	6
6	(India) S Devvarman	2	1
