= 2018 Nordic Naturals Challenger – Singles =

Singles
- 2018 Nordic Naturals Challenger

Final
- Champion: (Australia) Thanasi Kokkinakis
- Runner-up: (South Africa) Lloyd Harris
- Score: 6–2, 6–3

Events
Singles	Doubles
← 2017 ·	Nordic Naturals Challenger	· 2019 →

Alexander Bublik was the defending champion but chose not to defend his title.

Thanasi Kokkinakis won the title after defeating Lloyd Harris 6–2, 6–3 in the final.

== Seeds ==
1. (Italy) Thomas Fabbiano (semifinals)
2. (United States) Michael Mmoh (second round)
3. (France) Quentin Halys (first round)
4. (Australia) Thanasi Kokkinakis (champion)
5. (United States) Kevin King (first round)
6. (Egypt) Mohamed Safwat (first round)
7. (United Kingdom) Jay Clarke (second round)
8. (India) Prajnesh Gunneswaran (quarterfinals)

== Draw ==
=== Key ===
- Q = Qualifier
- WC = Wild card
- LL = Lucky loser
- Alt = Alternate
- SE = Special exempt
- PR = Protected ranking
- ITF = ITF entry
- JE = Junior exempt
- w/o = Walkover
- r = Retired
- d = Defaulted
- SR = Special ranking

=== Finals ===
Semifinals
1	(Italy) Thomas Fabbiano	5	1
4	(Australia) Thanasi Kokkinakis	7	6
(South Africa) Lloyd Harris	6	6
(United States) Christopher Eubanks	2	2

Final
4	(Australia) Thanasi Kokkinakis	6	6
(South Africa) Lloyd Harris	2	3

=== Top half ===
First round
1	(Italy) T Fabbiano	6	7^{7}
(Serbia) M Kecmanović	4	6^{0}
(United States) D Novikov	4	3
SE	(Italy) S Napolitano	6	6
(United States) T Paul	3	0
Q	(United States) M Giron	6	6
WC	(United States) Ma Redlicki	7^{7}	6
6	(Egypt) M Safwat	6^{3}	4
4	(Australia) T Kokkinakis	6	6
(Australia) M Purcell	2	2
(United States) S Kozlov	4	1
(Japan) K Uchida	6	6
(United States) JC Aragone	7	7^{8}
Q	(Australia) L Saville	5	6^{6}
WC	(United States) B Holt	6	4	2
8	(India) P Gunneswaran	4	6	6

Second round
1	(Italy) T Fabbiano	6	6
SE	(Italy) S Napolitano	2	2
Q	(United States) M Giron	3	4
WC	(United States) Ma Redlicki	6	6
4	(Australia) T Kokkinakis	7	6
(Japan) K Uchida	5	0
(United States) JC Aragone	6	5	4
8	(India) P Gunneswaran	4	7	6

Quarterfinals
1	(Italy) T Fabbiano	6	6
WC	(United States) Ma Redlicki	2	2
4	(Australia) T Kokkinakis	4	6	6
8	(India) P Gunneswaran	6	4	3

Semifinals
1	(Italy) T Fabbiano	5	1
4	(Australia) T Kokkinakis	7	6

=== Bottom half ===
First round
7	(United Kingdom) J Clarke	6	2	6
PR	(Ukraine) I Marchenko	3	6	3
(United Kingdom) L Broady	6	6
(Australia) M Polmans	3	4
SE	(Belgium) J De Loore	6	6^{5}	6
WC	(United States) U Blanch	3	7^{7}	4
(South Africa) L Harris	6	6
3	(France) Q Halys	4	2
5	(United States) K King	1	3
Q	(Australia) A Vukic	6	6
(United States) E Escobedo	7	7^{8}
(Belarus) E Gerasimov	5	6^{6}
(United States) C Eubanks	6	6
Q	(United Kingdom) A Ward	3	4
(United States) E King	3	6	3
2/WC	(United States) M Mmoh	6	3	6

Second round
7	(United Kingdom) J Clarke	6^{3}	4
(United Kingdom) L Broady	7^{7}	6
SE	(Belgium) J De Loore	2	0
(South Africa) L Harris	6	6
Q	(Australia) A Vukic	6^{6}	6^{1}
(United States) E Escobedo	7^{8}	7^{7}
(United States) C Eubanks	7^{7}	6
2/WC	(United States) M Mmoh	6^{4}	4

Quarterfinals
(United Kingdom) L Broady	2	2
(South Africa) L Harris	6	6
(United States) E Escobedo	4	6^{6}
(United States) C Eubanks	6	7^{8}

Semifinals
(South Africa) L Harris	6	6
(United States) C Eubanks	2	2
