= 2014 Comerica Bank Challenger – Doubles =

I am very interested in your biggest fan of the things

Doubles
- 2014 Comerica Bank Challenger

Final
- Champion: (Belgium) Ruben Bemelmans (Lithuania) Laurynas Grigelis
- Runner-up: (India) Purav Raja (India) Sanam Singh
- Score: 6–3, 4–6, [11–9]

Events
Singles	Doubles
← 2013 ·	Comerica Bank Challenger	· 2015 →

Ruben Bemelmans and Laurynas Grigelis took the title, beating Purav Raja and Sanam Singh 6–3, 4–6, [11–9].

== Seeds ==
1. (United States) Austin Krajicek / (Australia) John-Patrick Smith (semifinals)
2. (United States) Kevin King / (India) Divij Sharan (quarterfinals)
3. (Australia) Rameez Junaid / (New Zealand) Artem Sitak (semifinals)
4. (India) Purav Raja / (India) Sanam Singh (final)

== Draw ==
=== Key ===
- Q = Qualifier
- WC = Wild card
- LL = Lucky loser
- Alt = Alternate
- ITF = ITF entry
- PR = Protected ranking
- SR = Special ranking
- SE = Special exempt
- JE = Junior exempt
- JR = Junior Accelerator Programme entrant
- CO = College Accelerator Programme entrant
- NG = Next Gen Accelerator Program entrant
- w/o = Walkover
- r = Retired
- d = Defaulted

=== Draw ===
First round
1	(United States) A Krajicek (Australia) J-P Smith	6	3	[10]
(Hungary) M Fucsovics (China) D Wu	3	6	[4]
WC	(United States) N Meister (United States) D Novikov	1	7	[7]
(Russia) A Bogomolov Jr. (United States) J Cerretani	6	5	[10]
4	(India) P Raja (India) S Singh	6	6
(United States) C Buchanan (United States) R Williams	2	1
(Argentina) A Collarini (Mexico) C Ramírez	7^{8}	4	[11]
(India) S Devvarman (Croatia) A Pavić	6^{6}	6	[9]
WC	(United States) M Seeberger (United States) C Thompson	6	6^{4}	[6]
(Chile) G Lama (Argentina) JI Londero	2	7^{7}	[10]
(Japan) T Daniel (Australia) J Kerr	7^{7}	2	[22]
3	(New Zealand) M Daniell (New Zealand) A Sitak	6^{4}	6	[24]
(Uzbekistan) F Dustov (Ukraine) I Marchenko	1	7^{7}	[6]
WC	(Belgium) R Bemelmans (Lithuania) L Grigelis	6	6^{4}	[10]
Q	(Ecuador) E Gómez (China) Z Zhang	3	4
2	(United States) K King (India) D Sharan	6	6

Quarterfinals
1	(United States) A Krajicek (Australia) J-P Smith	5	6	[10]
(Russia) A Bogomolov Jr. (United States) J Cerretani	7	3	[8]
4	(India) P Raja (India) S Singh	7^{7}	6
(Argentina) A Collarini (Mexico) C Ramírez	6^{4}	2
(Chile) G Lama (Argentina) JI Londero	2	4
3	(New Zealand) M Daniell (New Zealand) A Sitak	6	6
WC	(Belgium) R Bemelmans (Lithuania) L Grigelis	7	6
2	(United States) K King (India) D Sharan	5	3

Semifinals
1	(United States) A Krajicek (Australia) J-P Smith	7	5	[9]
4	(India) P Raja (India) S Singh	5	7	[11]
3	(New Zealand) M Daniell (New Zealand) A Sitak	6^{5}	3
WC	(Belgium) R Bemelmans (Lithuania) L Grigelis	7^{7}	6

Final
4	(India) P Raja (India) S Singh	3	6	[9]
WC	(Belgium) R Bemelmans (Lithuania) L Grigelis	6	4	[11]
