= 2017 Nordic Naturals Challenger =

- Date: 7–13 August
- Edition: 30th
- Location: Aptos, California, United States

Champions

Singles
- (Kazakhstan) Alexander Bublik

Doubles
- (Israel) Jonathan Erlich / (United Kingdom) Neal Skupski
| ← 2016 · | Nordic Naturals Challenger | · 2018 → |

The 2017 Nordic Naturals Challenger was a professional tennis tournament played on hard courts. It was the 30th edition of the tournament which was part of the 2017 ATP Challenger Tour. It took place in Aptos, California, United States between 7 and 13 August 2017.

== Singles main-draw entrants ==
=== Seeds ===
| Country | Player | Rank^{1} | Seed |
|---|---|---|---|
| TUN | Malek Jaziri | 73 | 1 |
| AUS | Jordan Thompson | 75 | 2 |
| SUI | Henri Laaksonen | 96 | 3 |
| BEL | Ruben Bemelmans | 98 | 4 |
| KAZ | Mikhail Kukushkin | 102 | 5 |
| USA | Tennys Sandgren | 106 | 6 |
| NOR | Casper Ruud | 109 | 7 |
| USA | Bjorn Fratangelo | 117 | 8 |

- ^{1} Rankings are as of July 31, 2017.

=== Other entrants ===
The following players received wildcards into the singles main draw:

- (United States) Taylor Fritz
- (United States) John Lamble
- (United States) Mackenzie McDonald
- (United States) Dennis Novikov

The following players received entry into the singles main draw as special exempts:

- (United Kingdom) Cameron Norrie
- (United States) Raymond Sarmiento

The following player received entry into the singles main draw as an alternate:

- (Belgium) Joris De Loore

The following players received entry from the qualifying draw:

- (United Kingdom) Liam Broady
- (United States) Austin Krajicek
- (Denmark) Frederik Nielsen
- (Indonesia) Christopher Rungkat

== Champions ==
=== Singles ===
- (Kazakhstan) Alexander Bublik def. (United Kingdom) Liam Broady 6–2, 6–3.

=== Doubles ===
- (Israel) Jonathan Erlich / (United Kingdom) Neal Skupski def. (Australia) Alex Bolt / (Australia) Jordan Thompson 6–3, 2–6, [10–8].
