= 2014 Comerica Bank Challenger =

- Date: 2–10 August
- Edition: 27th
- Location: Aptos, California, United States

Champions

Singles
- (Cyprus) Marcos Baghdatis

Doubles
- (Belgium) Ruben Bemelmans / (Lithuania) Laurynas Grigelis
← 2013 ·	Comerica Bank Challenger	· 2015 →

The 2014 Comerica Bank Challenger was a professional tennis tournament played on hard courts. It was the 27th edition of the tournament which was part of the 2014 ATP Challenger Tour. It took place in Aptos, California, United States between 2 and 10 August July 2014.

== Singles main-draw entrants ==
=== Seeds ===
Country	Player	Rank^{1}	Seed
KAZ	Mikhail Kukushkin	54	1
CYP	Marcos Baghdatis	105	2
RUS	Evgeny Donskoy	111	3
JPN	Go Soeda	115	4
IND	Somdev Devvarman	132	5
CRO	Ante Pavić	139	6
UZB	Farrukh Dustov	144	7
HUN	Márton Fucsovics	154	8

- ^{1} Rankings are as of July 28, 2014.

=== Other entrants ===
The following players received wildcards into the singles main draw:

- (United States) Andre Dome
- (United States) Marcos Giron
- (United States) Kevin King
- (United States) Mackenzie McDonald

The following players received entry from the qualifying draw:

- (United States) Dennis Nevolo
- (United States) Daniel Nguyen
- (India) Sanam Singh
- (Japan) Yasutaka Uchiyama

The following player entered into the singles main draw as an alternative:

- (China) Wu Di

== Champions ==
=== Singles ===
- (Cyprus) Marcos Baghdatis def. (Kazakhstan) Mikhail Kukushkin 7–6^{(9–7)}, 6–4

=== Doubles ===
- (Belgium) Ruben Bemelmans / (Lithuania) Laurynas Grigelis def. (India) Purav Raja / (India) Sanam Singh 6–3, 4–6, [11–9]
