= 2011 Comerica Bank Challenger – Singles =

Men's tennis tournament

Singles
- 2011 Comerica Bank Challenger

Final
- Champion: (Lithuania) Laurynas Grigelis
- Runner-up: (Serbia) Ilija Bozoljac
- Score: 6–2, 7–6^{(7–4)}

Events
| Singles | Doubles |
| ← 2010 · | Comerica Bank Challenger | · 2012 → |

Marinko Matosevic, the defending champion, didn't participate this year.

Laurynas Grigelis won the title, defeating Ilija Bozoljac 6–2, 7–6^{(7–4)} in the final.

== Seeds ==
1. (Russia) Igor Kunitsyn (semifinals)
2. (United States) Donald Young (first round)
3. (Australia) Matthew Ebden (quarterfinals)
4. (United States) Wayne Odesnik (quarterfinals)
5. (Australia) Chris Guccione (first round)
6. (Australia) Carsten Ball (semifinals)
7. (Serbia) Ilija Bozoljac (final)
8. (Bosnia and Herzegovina) Amer Delić (first round)

== Draw ==
=== Key ===
- Q = Qualifier
- WC = Wild card
- LL = Lucky loser
- Alt = Alternate
- SE = Special exempt
- PR = Protected ranking
- ITF = ITF entry
- JE = Junior exempt
- w/o = Walkover
- r = Retired
- d = Defaulted
- SR = Special ranking

=== Finals ===
Semifinals
1 | (Russia) Igor Kunitsyn | 4 | 6 | 6^{8}
(Lithuania) Laurynas Grigelis | 6 | 2 | 7^{10}
6 | (Australia) Carsten Ball | 6^{3} | 3
7 | (Serbia) Ilija Bozoljac | 7^{7} | 6

Final
(Lithuania) Laurynas Grigelis | 6 | 7^{7}
7 | (Serbia) Ilija Bozoljac | 2 | 6^{4}

=== Top half ===
First round
1 | (Russia) I Kunitsyn | 6 | 1
(South Korea) K-t Im | 3 | 0^{r}
Q | (United States) Alexander Domijan | 6 | 6
(Japan) T Matsui | 3 | 4
(United States) Greg Ouellette | 1 | 4
(South Africa) R Klaasen | 6 | 6
(New Zealand) M Venus | 7^{9} | 6
5 | (Australia) C Guccione | 6^{7} | 3
3 | (Australia) M Ebden | 7 | 6
(United States) N Monroe | 6^{4} | 4
Q | (United States) Andre Dome | 2 | 6^{5}
WC | (United States) J Sock | 6 | 7
(Lithuania) L Grigelis | 6 | 6
(South Korea) D Yoo | 2 | 3
LL | (Chinese Taipei) J Wang | 6 | 6
8 | (Bosnia and Herzegovina) A Delić | 3 | 3

Second round
1 | (Russia) I Kunitsyn | 7 | 6
Q | (United States) A Domijan | 5 | 3
(South Africa) R Klaasen | 4 | 4
(New Zealand) M Venus | 6 | 6
3 | (Australia) M Ebden | 4 | 6 | 6
WC | (United States) J Sock | 6 | 3 | 4
(Lithuania) L Grigelis | 6 | 6
LL | (Chinese Taipei) J Wang | 2 | 4

Quarterfinals
1 | (Russia) I Kunitsyn | 6 | 6
(New Zealand) M Venus | 3 | 4
3 | (Australia) M Ebden | 6 | 6^{5} | 2
(Lithuania) L Grigelis | 3 | 7^{7} | 6

Semifinals
1 | (Russia) I Kunitsyn | 4 | 6 | 6^{8}
(Lithuania) L Grigelis | 6 | 2 | 7^{10}

=== Bottom half ===
First round
6 | (Australia) C Ball | 6 | 5 | 6
Alt | (Canada) P-L Duclos | 4 | 7 | 4
(United States) Robby Ginepri | 2 | 4
LL | (United States) R Williams | 6 | 6
Q | (United States) P Simmonds | 6^{4} | 6 | 0
(United States) K Kim | 7 | 3 | 6
(Japan) H Kondo | 1 | 4
4 | (United States) W Odesnik | 6 | 6
7 | (Serbia) I Bozoljac | 6 | 6
WC | (United States) S Johnson | 3 | 3
(New Zealand) A Sitak | 3 | 6^{2}
(United Kingdom) J Baker | 6 | 7^{7}
WC | (United States) B Klahn | 6 | 5 | 3
Q | (United States) D Martin | 4 | 7 | 6
(United Kingdom) A Bogdanovic | 7 | 6
2 | (United States) D Young | 6^{2} | 2

Second round
6 | (Australia) C Ball | 4 | 7 | 7^{7}
LL | (United States) R Williams | 6 | 5 | 6^{6}
(United States) K Kim | 0 | 6 | 1
4 | (United States) W Odesnik | 6 | 4 | 6
7 | (Serbia) I Bozoljac | 2 | 6 | 7^{7}
(United Kingdom) J Baker | 6 | 1 | 6^{4}
Q | (United States) D Martin | 1 | 2
(United Kingdom) A Bogdanovic | 6 | 6

Quarterfinals
6 | (Australia) C Ball | 4 | 7^{7} | 6
4 | (United States) W Odesnik | 6 | 6^{5} | 4
7 | (Serbia) I Bozoljac | 7^{8} | 6^{8} | 6
(United Kingdom) A Bogdanovic | 6^{6} | 7^{10} | 3

Semifinals
6 | (Australia) C Ball | 6^{3} | 3
7 | (Serbia) I Bozoljac | 7^{7} | 6
