= 2018 Nordic Naturals Challenger =

- Date: 6–12 August
- Edition: 31st
- Location: Aptos, California, United States

Champions

Singles
- (Australia) Thanasi Kokkinakis

Doubles
- (Australia) Thanasi Kokkinakis / (Australia) Matt Reid
← 2017 ·	Nordic Naturals Challenger	· 2019 →

The 2018 Nordic Naturals Challenger was a professional tennis tournament played on hard courts. It was the 31st edition of the tournament which was part of the 2018 ATP Challenger Tour. It took place in Aptos, California, United States between 6 and 12 August 2018.

== Singles main-draw entrants ==
=== Seeds ===
Country	Player	Rank^{1}	Seed
ITA	Thomas Fabbiano	106	1
USA	Michael Mmoh	121	2
FRA	Quentin Halys	150	3
AUS	Thanasi Kokkinakis	164	4
USA	Kevin King	170	5
EGY	Mohamed Safwat	173	6
GBR	Jay Clarke	175	7
IND	Prajnesh Gunneswaran	177	8

- ^{1} Rankings are as of July 30, 2018.

=== Other entrants ===
The following players received wildcards into the singles main draw:

- (United States) Ulises Blanch
- (United States) Brandon Holt
- (United States) Michael Mmoh
- (United States) Martin Redlicki

The following player received entry into the singles main draw using a protected ranking:

- (Ukraine) Illya Marchenko

The following players received entry into the singles main draw using special exempts:

- (Belgium) Joris De Loore
- (Italy) Stefano Napolitano

The following players received entry from the qualifying draw:

- (United States) Marcos Giron
- (Australia) Luke Saville
- (Australia) Aleksandar Vukic
- (United Kingdom) Alexander Ward

== Champions ==
=== Singles ===
- (Australia) Thanasi Kokkinakis def. (South Africa) Lloyd Harris 6–2, 6–3.

=== Doubles ===
- (Australia) Thanasi Kokkinakis / (Australia) Matt Reid def. (United Kingdom) Jonny O'Mara / (United Kingdom) Joe Salisbury 6–2, 4–6, [10–8].
