= 2015 Comerica Bank Challenger =

- Date: 10–16 August
- Edition: 28th
- Location: Aptos, California, United States

Champions

Singles
- (Australia) John Millman

Doubles
- (Australia) Chris Guccione / (New Zealand) Artem Sitak
← 2014 ·	Comerica Bank Challenger	· 2016 →

The 2015 Comerica Bank Challenger was a professional tennis tournament played on hard courts. It was the 28th edition of the tournament which was part of the 2015 ATP Challenger Tour. It took place in Aptos, California, United States between 10 and 16 August 2015.

== Singles main-draw entrants ==
=== Seeds ===
Country	Player	Rank^{1}	Seed
AUS	John Millman	84	1
TUN	Malek Jaziri	85	2
GBR	Kyle Edmund	107	3
USA	Bjorn Fratangelo	110	4
JPN	Taro Daniel	111	5
AUS	Matthew Ebden	127	6
USA	Austin Krajicek	131	7
JPN	Yoshihito Nishioka	136	8

- ^{1} Rankings are as of August 3, 2015.

=== Other entrants ===
The following players received wildcards into the singles main draw:

- (United States) Jared Donaldson
- (United States) Taylor Harry Fritz
- (Germany) Tommy Haas
- (United States) Mitchell Krueger

The following players entered into the singles main draw as alternates:

- (United States) Dennis Novikov
- (United States) Alexander Sarkissian

The following players received entry from the qualifying draw:

- (United States) Daniel Nguyen
- (United States) Tennys Sandgren
- (China) Zhang Ze
- (Germany) Mischa Zverev

The following players received entry as a lucky loser:

- (Japan) Takuto Niki

== Champions ==
=== Singles ===
- (Australia) John Millman def. (United States) Austin Krajicek, 7–5, 2–6, 6–3

=== Doubles ===
- (Australia) Chris Guccione / (New Zealand) Artem Sitak def. (India) Yuki Bhambri / (Australia) Matthew Ebden, 6–4, 7–6^{(7–2)}
