= 2011 Comerica Bank Challenger =

- Date: 11–17 July
- Edition: 24th
- Location: Aptos, California, United States

Champions

Singles
- (Lithuania) Laurynas Grigelis

Doubles
- (Australia) Carsten Ball / (Australia) Chris Guccione
← 2010 ·	Comerica Bank Challenger	· 2012 →

The 2011 Comerica Bank Challenger was a professional tennis tournament played on hard courts. It was the 24th edition of the tournament which was part of the 2011 ATP Challenger Tour. It took place in Aptos, California, United States between 11 and 17 July 2011.

== Singles main-draw entrants ==
=== Seeds ===
Country	Player	Rank^{1}	Seed
RUS	Igor Kunitsyn	62	1
USA	Donald Young	66	2
AUS	Matthew Ebden	157	3
USA	Wayne Odesnik	214	4
AUS	Chris Guccione	217	5
AUS	Carsten Ball	225	6
SRB	Ilija Bozoljac	235	7
BIH	Amer Delić	238	8

- ^{1} Rankings are as of July 4, 2011.

=== Other entrants ===
The following players received wildcards into the singles main draw:

- (United States) Steve Johnson
- (United States) Bradley Klahn
- (United States) Jack Sock

The following players received entry from the qualifying draw:

- (United States) Andre Dome
- (United States) Alexander Domijan
- (United States) David Martin
- (United States) Phillip Simmonds

The following players received entry as a lucky loser into the singles main draw:

- (Chinese Taipei) Jimmy Wang
- (United States) Rhyne Williams

== Champions ==
=== Singles ===
(Lithuania) Laurynas Grigelis def. (Serbia) Ilija Bozoljac, 6–2, 7–6^{(7–4)}

=== Doubles ===
(Australia) Carsten Ball / (Australia) Chris Guccione def. (United States) John Paul Fruttero / (South Africa) Raven Klaasen, 7–6^{(7–5)}, 6–4
