= 2019 Nordic Naturals Challenger =

- Date: 5–11 August
- Edition: 32nd
- Location: Aptos, United States

Champions

Singles
- (United States) Steve Johnson

Doubles
- (El Salvador) Marcelo Arévalo / (Mexico) Miguel Ángel Reyes-Varela
← 2018 ·	Nordic Naturals Challenger	· 2020 →

The 2019 Nordic Naturals Challenger was a professional tennis tournament played on hard courts. It was the 32nd edition of the tournament which was part of the 2019 ATP Challenger Tour. It took place in Aptos, United States between 5 and 11 August 2019.

== Singles main-draw entrants ==
=== Seeds ===
Country	Player	Rank^{1}	Seed
BIH	Damir Džumhur	92	1
USA	Steve Johnson	94	2
JPN	Taro Daniel	118	3
GER	Dominik Köpfer	123	4
USA	Bjorn Fratangelo	124	5
BLR	Egor Gerasimov	130	6
USA	Marcos Giron	138	7
USA	Michael Mmoh	159	8
FRA	Enzo Couacaud	164	9
JPN	Go Soeda	168	10
USA	Mitchell Krueger	174	11
ECU	Emilio Gómez	177	12
USA	Christopher Eubanks	178	13
IND	Ramkumar Ramanathan	182	14
~~BAR~~	~~Darian King~~	~~186~~	~~15~~
BEL	Ruben Bemelmans	188	16

- ^{1} Rankings are as of July 29, 2019.

=== Other entrants ===
The following players received wildcards into the singles main draw:

- (United States) Jenson Brooksby
- (United States) Ryan Harrison
- (United States) Brandon Holt
- (United States) Sam Riffice
- (United States) Donald Young

The following players received entry into the singles main draw as alternates:

- (United States) Dennis Novikov
- (United States) Michael Redlicki
- (United States) Alexander Sarkissian

The following players received entry into the singles main draw using their ITF World Tennis Ranking:

- (United States) Maxime Cressy
- (United Kingdom) Lloyd Glasspool
- (United Kingdom) Evan Hoyt
- (United States) Martin Redlicki
- (Netherlands) Tim van Rijthoven

The following players received entry from the qualifying draw:

- (United States) Keegan Smith
- (Ukraine) Volodymyr Uzhylovskyi

The following player received entry as a lucky loser:

- (Netherlands) Sem Verbeek

== Champions ==
=== Singles ===
- (United States) Steve Johnson def. (Germany) Dominik Köpfer 6–4, 7–6^{(7–4)}.

=== Doubles ===
- (El Salvador) Marcelo Arévalo / (Mexico) Miguel Ángel Reyes-Varela def. (United States) Nathan Pasha / (United States) Max Schnur 5–7, 6–3, [10–8].
