= 2009 Comerica Bank Challenger =

- Date: July 13 – July 19
- Edition: 22nd
- Location: Aptos, United States

Champions

Singles
- (Australia) Chris Guccione

Doubles
- (Australia) Carsten Ball / (Australia) Chris Guccione
- Comerica Bank Challenger

The 2009 Comerica Bank Challenger was a professional tennis tournament played on hard court. It was the twenty-second edition of the tournament which is part of the 2009 ATP Challenger Tour. It took place in Aptos, United States between 13 and 19 July 2009.

== Singles entrants ==
=== Seeds ===
Nationality	Player	Ranking*	Seeding
USA	Kevin Kim	81	1
ITA	Flavio Cipolla	103	2
USA	Wayne Odesnik	106	3
THA	Danai Udomchoke	110	4
FRA	Arnaud Clément	128	5
IND	Somdev Devvarman	132	6
AUS	Chris Guccione	137	7
USA	Donald Young	152	8

- Rankings are as of July 6, 2009.

=== Other entrants ===
The following players received wildcards into the singles main draw:

- (United States) Lester Cook
- (United States) Alex Kuznetsov
- (United States) Phillip Simmonds
- (United States) Brad Weston

The following players received entry from the qualifying draw:

- (Australia) Nick Lindahl
- (Germany) Tobias Kamke
- (Japan) Yuichi Sugita
- (Japan) Takao Suzuki

== Champions ==
=== Singles ===
(Australia) Chris Guccione def. (Australia) Nick Lindahl, 6–3, 6–4

=== Doubles ===
(Australia) Carsten Ball / (Australia) Chris Guccione def. (Thailand) Sanchai Ratiwatana / (Thailand) Sonchat Ratiwatana, 6–3, 6–2
