= 2013 Comerica Bank Challenger =

- Date: 5–11 August
- Edition: 26th
- Location: Aptos, California, United States

Champions

Singles
- (United States) Bradley Klahn

Doubles
- (Israel) Jonathan Erlich / (Israel) Andy Ram
- Comerica Bank Challenger

The 2013 Comerica Bank Challenger was a professional tennis tournament played on hard courts. It was the 26th edition of the tournament which was part of the 2013 ATP Challenger Tour. It took place in Aptos, California, United States between 5 and 11 August July 2013.

== Singles main-draw entrants ==
=== Seeds ===
| Country | Player | Rank^{1} | Seed |
|---|---|---|---|
| ARG | Guido Pella | 76 | 1 |
| RUS | Evgeny Donskoy | 84 | 2 |
| USA | Steve Johnson | 101 | 3 |
| USA | Ryan Harrison | 107 | 4 |
| USA | Wayne Odesnik | 123 | 5 |
| USA | Bobby Reynolds | 138 | 6 |
| GER | Mischa Zverev | 140 | 7 |
| USA | Jimmy Wang | 144 | 8 |

- ^{1} Rankings are as of July 29, 2013.

=== Other entrants ===
The following players received wildcards into the singles main draw:

- (United States) Andre Dome
- (United States) Mitchell Krueger
- (United States) Dennis Novikov
- (United States) Tennys Sandgren

The following players got into the singles main draw via Special Exempt:

- (United Kingdom) Daniel Evans
- (Australia) Greg Jones

The following players received entry from the qualifying draw:

- (Uzbekistan) Farrukh Dustov
- (Republic of Ireland) James McGee
- (Ukraine) Denys Molchanov
- (Australia) John-Patrick Smith

The following players got into the singles main draw via Lucky Loser:

- (United Kingdom) James Ward

== Champions ==
=== Singles ===
- (United States) Bradley Klahn def. (United Kingdom) Dan Evans 3–6, 7–6^{(7–5)}, 6–4

=== Doubles ===
- (Israel) Jonathan Erlich / (Israel) Andy Ram def. (Australia) Chris Guccione / (Australia) Matt Reid 6–3, 6–7^{(6–8)}, [10–2]
