= Nicolaas Scholtz (tennis) =

South African tennis player

- Country (sports): South Africa
- Residence: Caledon, South Africa
- Born: 5 February 1991 (age 35) Caledon, South Africa
- Plays: Right-handed (Double-handed backhand)
- Prize money: $93,556

Singles
- Career record: 5–8
- Career titles: 0; 0 Challenger, 13 Futures
- Highest ranking: No. 320 (8 August 2016)

Grand Slam singles results
- Australian Open Junior: 1R (2009)
- French Open Junior: 2R (2009)
- Wimbledon Junior: 1R (2009)
- US Open Junior: 1R (2009)

Doubles
- Career record: 0–2
- Career titles: 0; 1 Challenger, 11 Futures
- Highest ranking: No. 251 (17 July 2017)

Grand Slam doubles results
- Australian Open Junior: 1R (2009)
- French Open Junior: QF (2009)
- Wimbledon Junior: 1R (2009)
- US Open Junior: 1R (2009)

Nicolaas (Nikala) "Nik" Scholtz (born 5 February 1991) is a former professional tennis player from Greyton, South Africa. Nicolaas qualified for the 2011 SA Tennis Open.

Scholtz is the son of Calla Scholtz, a former rugby player who represented Western Province in South Africa's domestic competition, the Currie Cup, from 1982 to 1989 (a total of 116 matches).

In 2012, Nicolaas represented South Africa in their Davis Cup play-off against Canada for a spot in the much esteemed World Group. He faced world number fifteen, Milos Raonic, in his first and only match, losing 5–7, 4–6, 5–7. South Africa lost the tie 4–1. In total he played seven ties for South Africa, producing a 5–7 singles record.

After spending his childhood in Greyton, a small town in the Boland, Western Cape, Nicolaas' family moved to Caledon and he attended Paarl Boys High School. He completed his studies at the University of Mississippi in the United States in 2015, earning four All-American colours four times. He is currently playing on the ITF Futures tour.

Scholtz has represented South Africa at the Davis Cup where he has a W/L record of 5–8.

At retirement, Scholtz was South Africa's third ranked tennis player behind Kevin Anderson and Lloyd Harris.

== Tennis career highlights ==
=== Juniors ===
In March 2008, Scholtz won his first ITF junior singles title at the G2 in Gaborone, Botswana.

As a junior, Scholtz reached a Career High Combined ranking of 22 in the International Tennis Federation's world junior ranking.

As a junior, he compiled a singles win–loss record of 67–27.

Junior Grand Slam results – Singles:

- Australian Open: 1R (2009)
- French Open: 2R (2009)
- Wimbledon: 1R (2009)
- US Open: 1R (2009)

Junior Grand Slam results – Doubles:

- Australian Open: 1R (2009)
- French Open: QF (2009)
- Wimbledon: 1R (2009)
- US Open: 1R (2009)

== ATP Challenger and ITF Futures finals ==
=== Singles: 20 (13 titles-7 runner-ups) ===
Legend (singles) ATP Challenger Tour (0-0) ITF Futures (13–7)	Titles by surface Hard (13-7) Clay (0-0) Grass (0–0) Carpet (0–0)

Outcome	No.	Date	Tournament	Surface	Opponent in the final	Score in the final
Winner	1.	16 December 2012	South Africa F2, Stellenbosch	Hard	(France) Simon Cauvard	6-3, 6-0
Runner-up	2.	23 June 2013	Turkey F24, Turkey	Hard	(Zimbabwe) Takanyi Garanganga	3-6, 5-7
Winner	3.	8 June 2014	South Africa F2, Stellenbosch	Hard	(South Africa) Tucker Vorster	6-4, 6-3
Winner	4.	15 June 2014	South Africa F3, Stellenbosch	Hard	(South Africa) Fritz Wolmarans	4–6, 6–2, 6–4
Runner-up	5.	20 July 2014	Turkey F25, Turkey	Hard	(Bosnia and Herzegovina) Aldin Šetkić	2–6, 3–6
Runner-up	6.	7 September 2014	Turkey F30, Turkey	Hard	(South Africa) Tucker Vorster	3–6, 6–3, 6–7
Winner	7.	14 September 2014	Turkey F31, Turkey	Hard	(France) Rémi Boutillier	6–4, 3–6, 7–6
Winner	8.	6 September 2015	Gabon F2, Libreville	Hard	(Spain) Javier Pulgar-Garcia	6–2, 5–7, 7–5
Winner	9.	4 October 2015	USA F28, Laguna Niguel	Hard	(United States) Wil Spencer	4–6, 6–4, 6–2
Winner	10.	8 November 2015	South Africa F1, Stellenbosch	Hard	(Austria) Pascal Brunner	7-6, 7-5
Runner-up	11.	5 June 2016	Turkey F22, Antalya	Hard	(Germany) Marc Sieber	0-6, 1-6
Runner-up	12.	10 July 2016	Zimbabwe F3, Harare	Hard	(South Africa) Tucker Vorster	6–3, 4–6, 5–7
Runner-up	13.	20 November 2016	South Africa F3, Stellenbosch	Hard	(South Africa) Lloyd Harris	5-7, 4-6
Winner	14.	19 March 2017	Egypt F9, Sharm el-Sheikh	Hard	(Bosnia and Herzegovina) Aldin Šetkić	7–6, 6–3
Winner	15.	14 May 2017	Mexico F3, Córdoba	Hard	(Ecuador) Iván Endara	6-4, 6–3
Winner	16.	18 June 2017	Zimbabwe F1, Harare	Hard	(Monaco) Lucas Catarina	2–6, 6–3, 6–0
Winner	17.	2 July 2017	Zimbabwe F3, Harare	Hard	(France) Baptiste Crepatte	6–7, 6–3, 6–6
Winner	18.	26 November 2017	South Africa F1, Stellenbosch	Hard	(France) Leny Mitjana	6-4, 6-4
Winner	19.	10 December 2017	South Africa F3, Stellenbosch	Hard	(France) Leny Mitjana	3–6, 6–1, 7–6
Runner-up	20.	15 April 2018	USA F10, Little Rock	Hard	(Brazil) Karue Sell	5-7, 2-6

=== Doubles: 24 (12 titles- 12 runner-ups) ===
Legend (doubles) ATP Challenger Tour (1-1) ITF Futures (11–11)	Titles by surface Hard (12-12) Clay (0-0) Grass (0–0) Carpet (0–0)

Outcome	No.	Date	Tournament	Surface	Partner	Opponents	Score in the final
Runner-up	1.	27 June 2011	Spain F22, Spain	Hard	(South Africa) Ruan Roelofse	(Spain) Juan Jose Leal-Gomez (Spain) Borja Rodriguez Manzano	3–6, 6–3, 10–12
Winner	2.	4 July 2011	Spain F23, Spain	Hard	(South Africa) Ruan Roelofse	(Italy) Francesco Borgo (Italy) Claudio Grassi	7-5, 6-3
Winner	3.	3 June 2013	Turkey F22, Turkey	Hard	(South Africa) Tucker Vorster	(Turkey) Anil Yuksel (Turkey) Abdullah Yilmaz	6-0, 6-4
Winner	4.	17 June 2013	Turkey F24, Turkey	Hard	(South Africa) Tucker Vorster	(Russia) Anton Manegin (Russia) Alexandre Krasnoroutskiy	7-6^{(7−1)}, 6-4
Winner	5.	2 June 2014	South Africa F2, South Africa	Hard	(South Africa) Tucker Vorster	(Zimbabwe) Mark Fynn (South Africa) Damon Gooch	6-3, 6-4
Runner-up	6.	9 June 2014	South Africa F3, South Africa	Hard	(South Africa) Tucker Vorster	(South Africa) Ruan Roelofse (South Africa) Dean O'Brien	6-7^{(6−8)}, 4-6
Runner-up	7.	7 July 2014	Turkey F24, Turkey	Hard	(South Africa) Tucker Vorster	(Australia) Scott Puodziunas (Australia) Darren K. Polkinghorne	6-7^{(7−9)}, 6-7^{(5−7)}
Winner	8.	14 July 2014	Turkey F25, Turkey	Hard	(South Africa) Tucker Vorster	(Australia) Damian Farinola (Czech Republic) Petr Michnev	6-2, 6-4
Winner	9.	25 August 2014	Turkey F29, Turkey	Hard	(South Africa) Tucker Vorster	(Turkey) Tuna Altuna (Turkey) Efe Yurtacan	6-4, 6-4
Runner-up	10.	1 June 2015	Mozambique F1, Maputo	Hard	(United States) Evan Song	(Uganda) Duncan Mugabe (Burundi) Hassan Ndayishimiye	3-6, 4-6
Winner	11.	21 June 2015	Zimbabwe F1, Harare	Hard	(South Africa) Lloyd Harris	(United States) Evan King (United States) Anderson Reed	7-5, 6-4
Runner-up	12.	28 June 2015	Zimbabwe F2, Harare	Hard	(South Africa) Tucker Vorster	(France) Romain Bauvy (France) Ronan Joncour	6-4, 6-7^{(5−7)}, 5-10
Winner	13.	6 September 2015	Gabon F2, Libreville	Hard	(South Africa) Tucker Vorster	(Spain) Javier Pulgar-Garcia (United States) Cameron Silverman	7-6^{(7-2)}, 6-1
Runner-up	14.	3 July 2016	Zimbabwe F2, Harare	Hard	(South Africa) Tucker Vorster	(France) Hugo Nys (India) Vishnu Vardhan	4-6, 2-6
Runner-up	15.	31 July 2016	Lexington Challenger, USA	Hard	(South Africa) Tucker Vorster	(Australia) Luke Saville (Australia) Jordan Thompson	2-6, 5-7
Winner	16.	14 August 2016	Aptos Challenger, USA	Hard	(South Africa) Tucker Vorster	(United States) Mackenzie McDonald (Japan) Ben McLachlan	6–7^{(5−7)}, 6–3, 10–8
Runner-up	17.	6 November 2016	South Africa F1, Stellenbosch	Hard	(South Africa) Chris Haggard	(Italy) Alessandro Bega (Switzerland) Luca Margaroli	5-7, 2-6
Winner	18.	12 February 2017	Egypt F4, Sharm el-Sheikh	Hard	(Germany) Jonas Luetjen	(Sweden) Markus Eriksson (Sweden) Milos Sekulic	6–2, 2–6, 11–9
Runner-up	19.	19 February 2017	Egypt F5, Sharm el-Sheikh	Hard	(Germany) Jonas Luetjen	(Australia) Nathan Eshmade (Netherlands) Sem Verbeek	6–3, 3–6, 3–10
Runner-up	20.	19 March 2017	Egypt F9, Sharm el-Sheikh	Hard	(South Africa) Lloyd Harris	(Ukraine) Denys Molchanov (Ukraine) Artem Smirnov	(W/O)
Winner	21.	7 May 2017	Mexico F2, Villahermosa	Hard (i)	(United States) Kevin King	(United Kingdom) Farris Fathi Gosea (United States) Nathaniel Lammons	7-6^{(7−4)}, 7-6^{(7−4)}
Runner-up	22.	21 May 2017	Mexico F4, Pachuca	Hard	(Philippines) Ruben Gonzales	(Mexico) Manuel Sánchez (Bolivia) Federico Zeballos	6–7^{(3−7)}, 2–6
Runner-up	23.	18 June 2017	Zimbabwe F1, Harare	Hard	(Zimbabwe) Mark Fynn	(Zimbabwe) Benjamin Lock (United States) Nathaniel Lammons	2-6, 3-6
Winner	24.	25 June 2017	Zimbabwe F2, Harare	Hard	(Zimbabwe) Mark Fynn	(Zimbabwe) Benjamin Lock (United States) Nathaniel Lammons	3–6, 6–1, 10–7
