= Raymond Sarmiento =

American tennis player

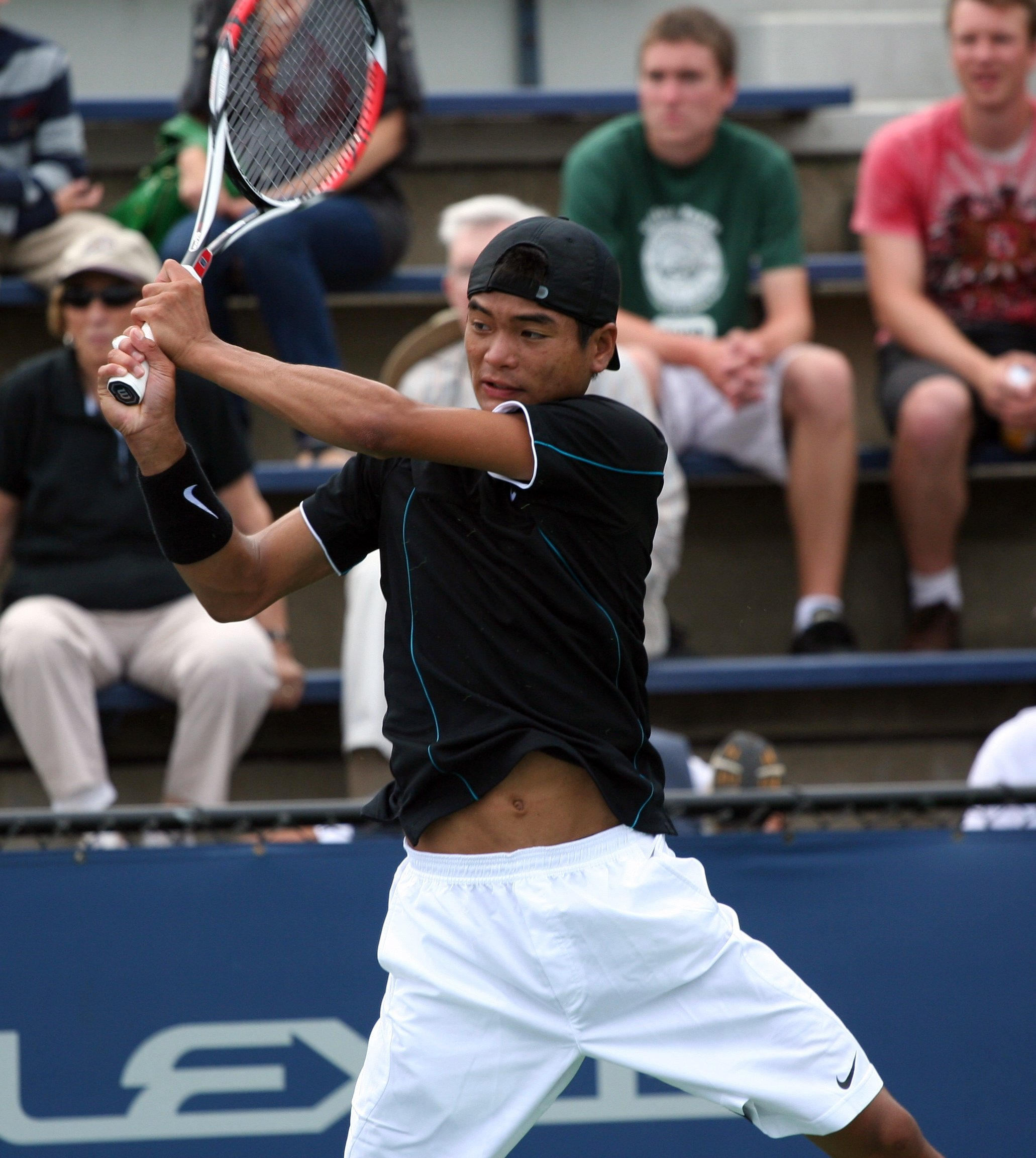
- Sarmiento at the 2009 US Open
- Country (sports): United States
- Residence: Los Angeles, California, U.S.
- Born: July 24, 1992 (age 34) Glendale, California, U.S.
- Height: 1.78 m (5 ft 10 in)
- Turned pro: 2009
- Plays: Right-handed (two-handed backhand)
- Prize money: $113,476

Singles
- Career record: 0–1 (at ATP Tour level, Grand Slam level, and in Davis Cup)
- Career titles: 0
- Highest ranking: No. 287 (11 September 2017)

Doubles
- Career record: 0–0 (at ATP Tour level, Grand Slam level, and in Davis Cup)
- Career titles: 0
- Highest ranking: No. 386 (7 March 2016)

Raymond Sarmiento (born July 24, 1992) is an American professional tennis player.

Sarmiento has a career-high ATP singles ranking of No. 287 achieved on 11 September 2017 and a career-high ATP doubles ranking of No. 386 on 7 March 2016.

Sarmiento made his ATP main draw debut at the 2019 Winston-Salem Open after qualifying for the singles draw by defeating Christopher Eubanks and Daniel Nguyen. He lost in the first round to Jérémy Chardy.

Sarmiento is a Filipino American.

== Hitting partner ==
In May 2022 he began working as Emma Raducanu's hitting partner, continuing through the 2022 French Open in Paris.
