= Tucker Vorster =

South African tennis player

- Full name: Tucker Vorster
- Country (sports): South Africa
- Residence: Pretoria, South Africa
- Born: 3 September 1988 (age 37) Pretoria, South Africa
- Height: 1.96 m (6 ft 5 in)
- Plays: Right-handed (two-handed backhand)
- Prize money: $60,998

Singles
- Career record: 0–0 (at ATP Tour level, Grand Slam level, and in Davis Cup)
- Career titles: 0
- Highest ranking: No. 278 (14 September 2015)

Doubles
- Career record: 0–1 (at ATP Tour level, Grand Slam level, and in Davis Cup)
- Career titles: 0
- Highest ranking: No. 258 (15 August 2016)

Tucker Vorster (born 3 September 1988) is a South African tennis player.

Vorster reached a career-high ATP singles ranking of 278 on 14 September 2015. His highest ATP doubles ranking was 258 on 15 August 2016.

Playing for South Africa in the Davis Cup, Vorster has a win/loss record of 2–1.
