= Nordic Naturals Challenger =

Comerica Bank Challenger

Defunct tennis tournament
- Event name: Aptos
- Location: Aptos, California, United States
- Venue: Seascape Sports Club
- Category: ATP Challenger Tour
- Surface: Hard
- Draw: 32S/28Q/16D
- Prize money: $100,000
- Website: Website

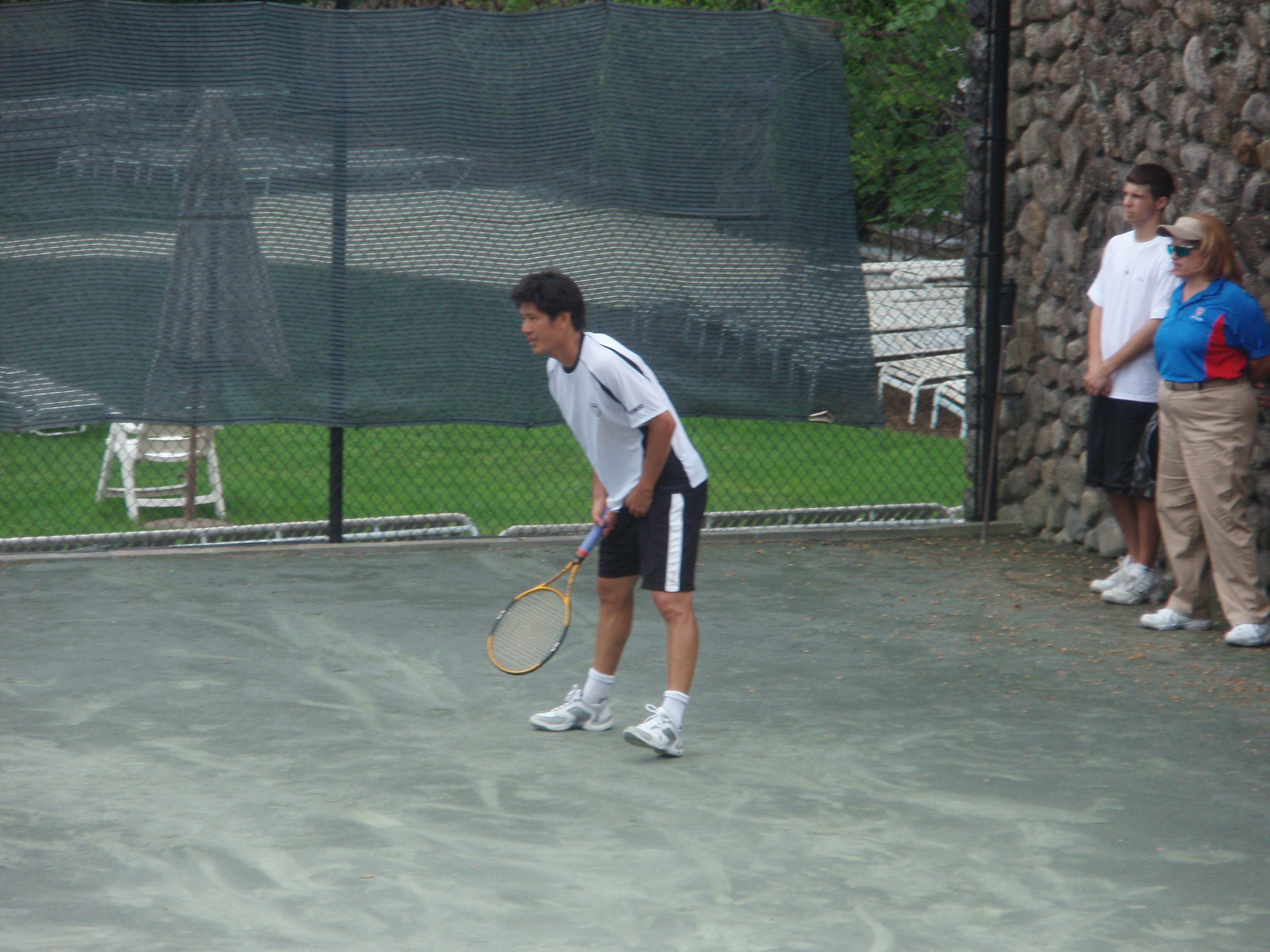
American Kevin Kim won his second Aptos singles title in 2008

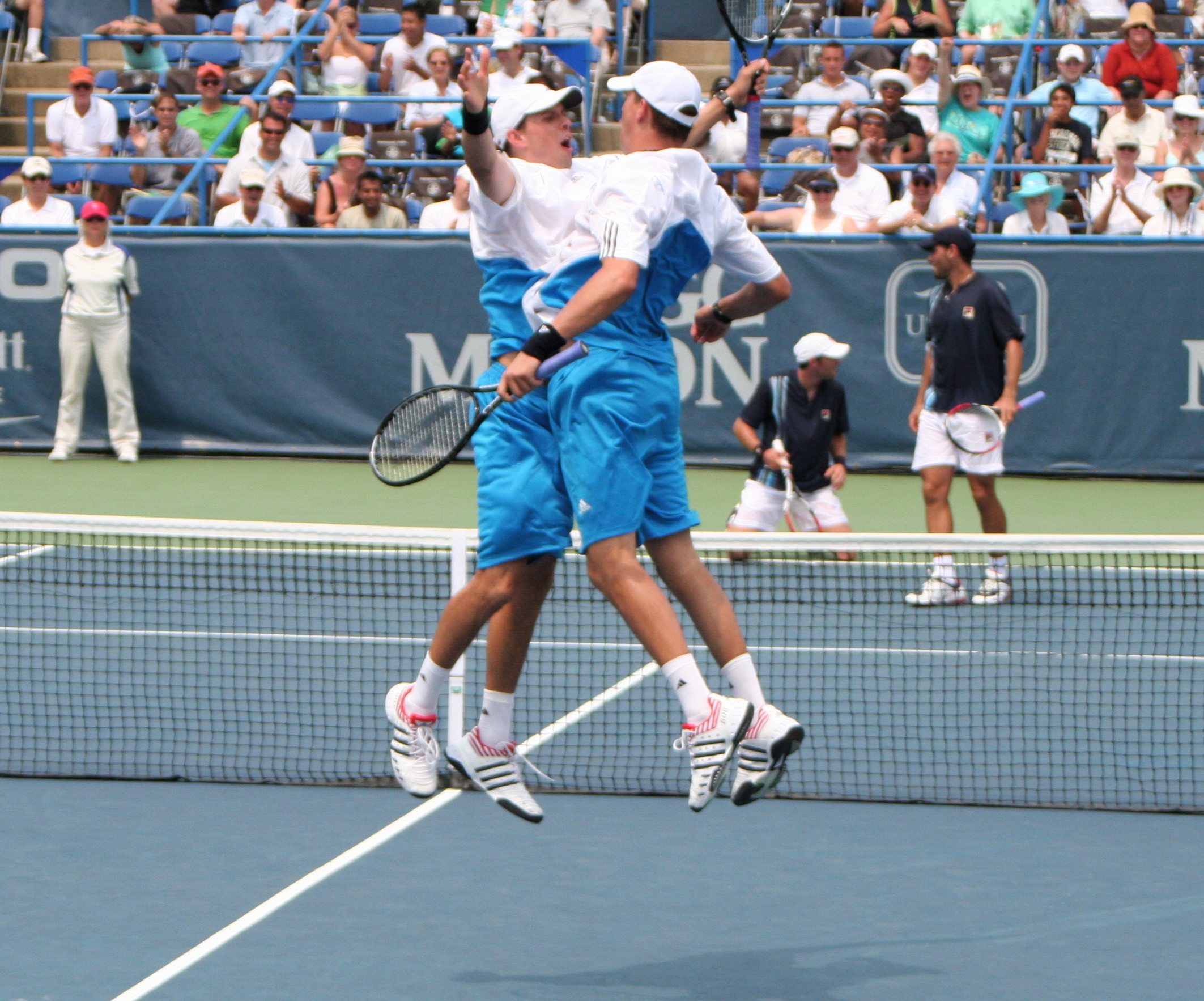
Eventual World No. 1 American pair of Bob and Mike Bryan won the doubles twice in 1998 and 2000, while Bob Bryan also claimed the singles title in 2000

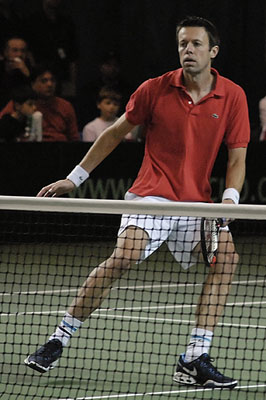
Canadian Daniel Nestor, an eventual World No. 1 in doubles, won the title in 1995 over Chris Woodruff

The Nordic Naturals Challenger (formerly Comerica Bank Challenger) was a professional tennis tournament played on outdoor hard courts. It was part of the ATP Challenger Tour. It was held annually at the Seascape Sports Club in Aptos, California, United States, since 1988.

== Past finals ==
=== Singles ===
Year	Champion	Runner-up	Score
2019	(United States) Steve Johnson	(Germany) Dominik Köpfer	6–4, 7–6^{(7–4)}
2018	(Australia) Thanasi Kokkinakis	(South Africa) Lloyd Harris	6–2, 6–3
2017	(Kazakhstan) Alexander Bublik	(United Kingdom) Liam Broady	6–2, 6–3
2016	(United Kingdom) Daniel Evans	(United Kingdom) Cameron Norrie	6–3, 6–4
2015	(Australia) John Millman	(United States) Austin Krajicek	7–5, 2–6, 6–3
2014	(Cyprus) Marcos Baghdatis	(Kazakhstan) Mikhail Kukushkin	7–6^{(9–7)}, 6–4
2013	(United States) Bradley Klahn	(United Kingdom) Daniel Evans	3–6, 7–6^{(7–5)}, 6–4
2012	(United States) Steve Johnson	(Colombia) Robert Farah	6–3, 6–3
2011	(Lithuania) Laurynas Grigelis	(Serbia) Ilija Bozoljac	6–2, 7–6^{(7–4)}
2010	(Australia) Marinko Matosevic	(United States) Donald Young	6–4, 6–2
2009	(Australia) Chris Guccione	(Australia) Nick Lindahl	6–3, 6–4
2008	(United States) Kevin Kim	(Italy) Andrea Stoppini	7–5, 6–1
2007	(United States) Donald Young	(United States) Bobby Reynolds	7–5, 6–0
2006	(United States) Alex Kuznetsov	(Japan) Go Soeda	6–1, 7–6(4)
2005	(United Kingdom) Andy Murray	(United States) Rajeev Ram	6–4, 6–3
2004	(United States) Kevin Kim	(Canada) Frank Dancevic	7–6(2), 6–3
2003	(United States) Jeff Salzenstein	(Russia) Dmitry Tursunov	5–7, 7–5, 6–4
2002	(United States) Brian Vahaly	(Israel) Noam Behr	2–6, 6–3, 6–2
2001	(United States) Jeff Salzenstein	(United States) Jeff Morrison	7–6(3), 6–4
2000	(United States) Bob Bryan	(United States) Kevin Kim	6–4, 6–7, 6–4
1999	(Australia) Michael Hill	(Israel) Harel Levy	6–7, 6–4, 6–2
1998	(United States) Cecil Mamiit	(Japan) Takao Suzuki	6–7, 6–3, 6–2
1997	(United States) Jan-Michael Gambill	(United States) Wade McGuire	6–0, 4–6, 6–3
1996	(Canada) Albert Chang	(United States) Brian MacPhie	7–5, 6–3
1995	(Canada) Daniel Nestor	(United States) Chris Woodruff	6–3, 5–7, 6–2
1994	(Japan) Shuzo Matsuoka	(Italy) Gianluca Pozzi	7–5, 6–3
1993	(Australia) Patrick Rafter	(Italy) Cristiano Caratti	6–2, 6–3
1992	(United States) Alex O'Brien	(Zimbabwe) Byron Black	6–4, 2–6, 6–1
1991	(United States) Chuck Adams	(United States) Bryan Shelton	6–3, 6–4
1990	(Sweden) Henrik Holm	(United States) Brian Garrow	1–6, 6–3, 7–6
1989	(South Africa) Mark Kaplan	(United States) Robbie Weiss	6–4, 6–4
1988	(United States) Brad Pearce	(United States) Tim Pawsat	6–3, 6–2

=== Doubles ===
Year	Champions	Runners-up	Score
2019	(El Salvador) Marcelo Arévalo (Mexico) Miguel Ángel Reyes-Varela	(United States) Nathan Pasha (United States) Max Schnur	5–7, 6–3, [10–8]
2018	(Australia) Thanasi Kokkinakis (Australia) Matt Reid	(United Kingdom) Jonny O'Mara (United Kingdom) Joe Salisbury	6–2, 4–6, [10–8]
2017	(Israel) Jonathan Erlich (United Kingdom) Neal Skupski	(Australia) Alex Bolt (Australia) Jordan Thompson	6–3, 2–6, [10–8]
2016	(South Africa) Nicolaas Scholtz (South Africa) Tucker Vorster	(United States) Mackenzie McDonald (New Zealand) Ben McLachlan	6–7^{(5–7)}, 6–3, [10–8]
2015	(Australia) Chris Guccione (New Zealand) Artem Sitak	(India) Yuki Bhambri (Australia) Matthew Ebden	6–4, 7–6^{(7–2)}
2014	(Belgium) Ruben Bemelmans (Lithuania) Laurynas Grigelis	(India) Purav Raja (India) Sanam Singh	6–3, 4–6, [11–9]
2013	(Israel) Jonathan Erlich (Israel) Andy Ram	(Australia) Chris Guccione (Australia) Matt Reid	6–3, 6–7^{(6–8)}, [10–2]
2012	(South Africa) Rik de Voest (Australia) John Peers	(Australia) Chris Guccione (Germany) Frank Moser	6–7^{(5–7)}, 6–1, [10–4]
2011	(Australia) Carsten Ball (Australia) Chris Guccione	(United States) John Paul Fruttero (South Africa) Raven Klaasen	7–6^{(7–5)}, 6–4
2010	(Australia) Carsten Ball (Australia) Chris Guccione	(Australia) Adam Feeney (Australia) Greg Jones	6–1, 6–3
2009	(Australia) Carsten Ball (Australia) Chris Guccione	(Thailand) Sanchai Ratiwatana (Thailand) Sonchat Ratiwatana	6–3, 6–2
2008	(Israel) Noam Okun (Israel) Amir Weintraub	(United States) Todd Widom (United States) Michael Yani	6–2, 6–1
2007	(United States) Rajeev Ram (United States) Bobby Reynolds	(United States) John Paul Fruttero (Philippines) Cecil Mamiit	6–7(5), 6–3, 10–7
2006	(India) Prakash Amritraj (India) Rohan Bopanna	(United States) Rajeev Ram (United States) Todd Widom	3–6, 6–2, 10–6
2005	(Australia) Nathan Healey (United States) Eric Taino	(Israel) Harel Levy (Israel) Noam Okun	7–5, 7–6(4)
2004	(United States) Huntley Montgomery (United States) Tripp Phillips	(United States) Diego Ayala (United States) Eric Taino	7–6(3), 7–5
2003	(Czech Republic) Jan Hernych (Italy) Uros Vico	(United States) Matías Boeker (United States) Travis Parrott	6–3, 4–6, 6–1
2002	(Israel) Amir Hadad (Argentina) Martín Vassallo Argüello	(United States) Brandon Coupe (United States) Brandon Hawk	6–4, 6–4
2001	(United States) Brandon Hawk (United States) Robert Kendrick	(United States) Kelly Gullett (United States) Gavin Sontag	7–5, 7–5
2000	(United States) Bob Bryan (United States) Mike Bryan	(United States) Kevin Kim (Australia) Luke Smith	6–4, 3–6, 6–4
1999	(Australia) Michael Hill (United States) Scott Humphries	(Israel) Harel Levy (Israel) Lior Mor	7–6, 1–6, 7–5
1998	(United States) Bob Bryan (United States) Mike Bryan	(United States) Adam Peterson (United States) Chris Tontz	6–4, 6–4
1997	(Canada) Sébastien Leblanc (Canada) Jocelyn Robichaud	(United States) David Caldwell (United States) Adam Peterson	7–6, 6–4
1996	(Canada) Sébastien Leblanc (Canada) Jocelyn Robichaud	(South Africa) Neville Godwin (United States) Geoff Grant	7–6, 6–7, 7–5
1995	(Canada) Sébastien Leblanc (United States) Brian MacPhie	(United States) Bill Barber (United States) Ari Nathan	6–3, 6–2
1994	(United States) Brian MacPhie (United States) Alex O'Brien	(United States) Donny Isaak (United States) Michael Roberts	6–2, 7–6
1993	(Israel) Gilad Bloom (Germany) Christian Saceanu	(Italy) Cristiano Caratti (Australia) Grant Doyle	7–5, 6–3
1992	(United States) Paul Annacone (United States) Alex O'Brien	(Puerto Rico) Miguel Nido (Sweden) Peter Nyborg	6–4, 4–6, 7–5
1991	(Nigeria) Nduka Odizor (United States) Bryan Shelton	(Puerto Rico) Miguel Nido (Brazil) Fernando Roese	6–4, 6–3
1990	(United States) Jeff Brown (United States) Scott Melville	(United States) Matt Anger (South Africa) Marius Barnard	6–7, 6–4, 6–4
1989	(United States) Steve DeVries (United States) Ted Scherman	(United States) Bryan Shelton (United States) Kenny Thorne	6–3, 1–6, 6–2
1988	(United States) Jeff Klaparda (United States) Peter Palandjian	(United States) Ed Nagel (United States) Jeff Tarango	6–3, 6–4
