= 2018 ATP Challenger China International – Nanchang – Doubles =

Nanchang – Doubles
- 2018 ATP Challenger China International – Nanchang

Final
- Champions: (China) Gong Maoxin (China) Zhang Ze
- Runners-up: (Philippines) Ruben Gonzales (Indonesia) Christopher Rungkat
- Score: 3–6, 7–6^{(9–7)}, [10–7]

Events
| Singles | Doubles |
| ← 2016 · | ATP Challenger China International – Nanchang | · 2019 → |

Wu Di and Zhang Zhizhen were the defending champions but only Wu chose to defend his title, partnering Wu Yibing. Wu lost in the quarterfinals to Quentin Halys and Calvin Hemery.

Gong Maoxin and Zhang Ze won the title after defeating Ruben Gonzales and Christopher Rungkat 3–6, 7–6^{(9–7)}, [10–7] in the final.

== Seeds ==
1. (India) Sriram Balaji / (India) Vishnu Vardhan (quarterfinals)
2. (Australia) Matt Reid / (Australia) Andrew Whittington (first round)
3. (Philippines) Ruben Gonzales / (Indonesia) Christopher Rungkat (final)
4. (Chinese Taipei) Chen Ti / (Chinese Taipei) Yi Chu-huan (quarterfinals)

== Draw ==
=== Key ===
- Q = Qualifier
- WC = Wild card
- LL = Lucky loser
- Alt = Alternate
- SE = Special exempt
- PR = Protected ranking
- ITF = ITF entry
- JE = Junior exempt
- w/o = Walkover
- r = Retired
- d = Defaulted
- SR = Special ranking

First round
1 | (India) S Balaji (India) V Vardhan | 6^{7} | 7^{7} | [10]
WC | (China) A Wang (China) Wu Hao | 7^{9} | 6^{4} | [8]
WC | (China) Y Bai (China) Li Yuanfeng | 1 | 1
(Poland) K Majchrzak (Japan) T Matsui | 6 | 6
3 | (Philippines) R Gonzales (Indonesia) C Rungkat | 6 | 6
WC | (China) X Gao (China) Xia Zihao | 3 | 4
(South Korea) Y-s Chung (South Korea) D-h Lee | 6 | 5 | [5]
(Lithuania) L Grigelis (Egypt) M Safwat | 2 | 7 | [10]
(Spain) R Ortega Olmedo (India) R Ramanathan | 3 | 7 | [11]
(China) M Gong (China) Ze Zhang | 6 | 5 | [13]
(Belarus) A Bury (Kazakhstan) A Nedovyesov | 3 | 6 | [8]
4 | (Chinese Taipei) T Chen (Chinese Taipei) C-h Yi | 6 | 4 | [10]
(France) Q Halys (France) C Hemery | 2 | 6 | [10]
(Chinese Taipei) C-p Hsieh (Chinese Taipei) T-h Yang | 6 | 3 | [4]
(China) D Wu (China) Y Wu | 6^{7} | 6 | [10]
2 | (Australia) M Reid (Australia) A Whittington | 7^{9} | 2 | [6]

Quarterfinals
1 | (India) S Balaji (India) V Vardhan | 7 | 4 | [5]
(Poland) K Majchrzak (Japan) T Matsui | 5 | 6 | [10]
3 | (Philippines) R Gonzales (Indonesia) C Rungkat | 2
(Lithuania) L Grigelis (Egypt) M Safwat | 1^{r}
(China) M Gong (China) Ze Zhang | 6 | 6
4 | (Chinese Taipei) T Chen (Chinese Taipei) C-h Yi | 4 | 2
(France) Q Halys (France) C Hemery | 7^{8} | 6
(China) D Wu (China) Y Wu | 6^{6} | 2

Semifinals
(Poland) K Majchrzak (Japan) T Matsui | 1 | 2
3 | (Philippines) R Gonzales (Indonesia) C Rungkat | 6 | 6
(China) M Gong (China) Ze Zhang | w/o
(France) Q Halys (France) C Hemery

Final
3 | (Philippines) R Gonzales (Indonesia) C Rungkat | 6 | 6^{7} | [7]
(China) M Gong (China) Ze Zhang | 3 | 7^{9} | [10]
