= 2014 ATP Challenger China International – Nanchang – Singles =

Nanchang – Singles
- 2014 ATP Challenger China International – Nanchang

Final
- Champion: (Japan) Go Soeda
- Runner-up: (Slovenia) Blaž Kavčič
- Score: 6–3, 2–6, 7–6^{(7–3)}

Events
Singles	Doubles
ATP Challenger China International – Nanchang	· 2015 →

This was the first edition of the tournament.

Go Soeda won the title, defeating Blaž Kavčič in the final, 6–3, 2–6, 7–6^{(7–3)}.

== Seeds ==
1. (Japan) Go Soeda (champion)
2. (Slovenia) Blaž Kavčič (final)
3. (Russia) Alexander Kudryavtsev (quarterfinals, retired)
4. (China) Zhang Ze (semifinals)
5. (China) Wu Di (second round)
6. (Russia) Valery Rudnev (second round, retired)
7. (France) Josselin Ouanna (second round)
8. (South Korea) Chung Hyeon (semifinals)

== Draw ==
=== Key ===
- Q = Qualifier
- WC = Wild card
- LL = Lucky loser
- Alt = Alternate
- SE = Special exempt
- PR = Protected ranking
- ITF = ITF entry
- JE = Junior exempt
- w/o = Walkover
- r = Retired
- d = Defaulted
- SR = Special ranking

=== Finals ===
Semifinals
1	(Japan) Go Soeda	6	2	6
4	(China) Zhang Ze	1	6	4
8	(South Korea) Chung Hyeon	0	1
2	(Slovenia) Blaž Kavčič	6	6

Final
1	(Japan) Go Soeda	6	2	7^{7}
2	(Slovenia) Blaž Kavčič	3	6	6^{3}

=== Top half ===
First round
1	(Japan) G Soeda	6	7^{7}
(France) F Martin	3	6^{3}
(Thailand) D Udomchoke	6	6
WC	(China) R Te	2	0
WC	(China) S Liu	4	4
(Chinese Taipei) T-h Yang	6	6
WC	(China) Y Ning	3	1
7	(France) J Ouanna	6	6
4	(China) Z Zhang	6	6
(India) J Nedunchezhiyan	2	0
(Japan) H Kondo	6	6
Q	(Japan) K Takeuchi	2	3
(United States) J Jung	3	6	6
(Germany) R Kern	6	3	2
Q	(Russia) M Ledovskikh	6	1^{r}
6	(Russia) V Rudnev	2

Second round
1	(Japan) G Soeda	7	6
(Thailand) D Udomchoke	5	1
(Chinese Taipei) T-h Yang	4	6	6
7	(France) J Ouanna	6	2	3
4	(China) Z Zhang	6	6
(Japan) H Kondo	0	1
(United States) J Jung	6	2
6	(Russia) V Rudnev	2	1^{r}

Quarterfinals
1	(Japan) G Soeda	6	6
(Chinese Taipei) T-h Yang	1	3
4	(China) Z Zhang	7	6
(United States) J Jung	5	0

Semifinals
1	(Japan) G Soeda	6	2	6
4	(China) Z Zhang	1	6	4

=== Bottom half ===
First round
8	(South Korea) H Chung	6	1	6
(South Korea) J-s Nam	4	6	3
(Russia) D Matsukevich	6	6
(Japan) Shuichi Sekiguchi	3	0
(India) S Balaji	3	3
(Chinese Taipei) T Chen	6	6
WC	(China) Y Bai	4	6	3
3	(Russia) A Kudryavtsev	6	1	6
5	(China) D Wu	6^{6}	6	6
(United States) E King	7^{8}	4	1
(Japan) T Matsui	6	7
Q	(Australia) R Agar	1	5
(Chinese Taipei) L-c Huang	1^{r}
(United States) N Meister	4
Q	(China) C Wang	4	0
2	(Slovenia) B Kavčič	6	6

Second round
8	(South Korea) H Chung	6	6
(Russia) D Matsukevich	2	3
(Chinese Taipei) T Chen	5	4
3	(Russia) A Kudryavtsev	7	6
5	(China) D Wu	6	1	3
(Japan) T Matsui	3	6	6
(United States) N Meister	3	7^{7}	0
2	(Slovenia) B Kavčič	6	6^{2}	6

Quarterfinals
8	(South Korea) H Chung	4
3	(Russia) A Kudryavtsev	3^{r}
(Japan) T Matsui	5	2
2	(Slovenia) B Kavčič	7	6

Semifinals
8	(South Korea) H Chung	0	1
2	(Slovenia) B Kavčič	6	6
