= 2014 ATP Challenger China International – Nanchang – Doubles =

Nanchang – Doubles
- 2014 ATP Challenger China International – Nanchang

Final
- Champion: (Chinese Taipei) Chen Ti (Chinese Taipei) Peng Hsien-yin
- Runner-up: (Australia) Jordan Kerr (France) Fabrice Martin
- Score: 6–2, 3–6, [12–10]

Events
Singles	Doubles
ATP Challenger China International – Nanchang	· 2015 →

This was the first edition of the tournament.

Chen Ti and Peng Hsien-yin won the title, defeating Jordan Kerr and Fabrice Martin in the final, 6–2, 3–6, [12–10].

== Seeds ==
1. (Chinese Taipei) Chen Ti / (Chinese Taipei) Peng Hsien-yin (champions)
2. (Australia) Jordan Kerr / (France) Fabrice Martin (final)
3. (Chinese Taipei) Lee Hsin-han / (China) Zhang Ze (semifinals)
4. (Australia) Ryan Agar / (Chinese Taipei) Huang Liang-chi (first round)

== Draw ==
=== Key ===
- Q = Qualifier
- WC = Wild card
- LL = Lucky loser
- Alt = Alternate
- SE = Special exempt
- PR = Protected ranking
- ITF = ITF entry
- JE = Junior exempt
- w/o = Walkover
- r = Retired
- d = Defaulted
- SR = Special ranking

=== Draw ===
First round
1	(Chinese Taipei) T Chen (Chinese Taipei) H-y Peng	6	6
WC	(China) R Hua (China) S Liu	3	4
(China) Y Bai (China) D Wu	6	6
(China) Gong Peng-Xiang (China) Gong Xiao	2	2
3	(Chinese Taipei) H-h Lee (China) Z Zhang	6	7
(Thailand) N Kadchapanan (Thailand) D Udomchoke	3	5
(India) S Balaji (Japan) Shuichi Sekiguchi	6	6
WC	(China) Chen Long (China) Wu Hao	3	2
(China) M Gong (Japan) H Kondo	6^{5}	7^{7}	[10]
(United States) N Meister (India) J Nedunchezhiyan	7^{7}	6^{2}	[4]
(South Korea) H Chung (South Korea) J-s Nam	3	7^{7}	[10]
4	(Australia) R Agar (Chinese Taipei) L-c Huang	6	6^{5}	[7]
WC	(China) Y Ning (China) A Wang	3	2
(Russia) D Matsukevich (Russia) V Rudnev	6	6
(Japan) T Matsui (Japan) G Soeda	6^{5}	6	[6]
2	(Australia) J Kerr (France) F Martin	7^{7}	3	[10]

Quarterfinals
1	(Chinese Taipei) T Chen (Chinese Taipei) H-y Peng	7^{7}	6
(China) Y Bai (China) D Wu	6^{2}	4
3	(Chinese Taipei) H-h Lee (China) Z Zhang	6	4	[10
(India) S Balaji (Japan) S Sekiguchi	2	6	[6]
(China) M Gong (Japan) H Kondo	2	7	[10]
(South Korea) H Chung (South Korea) J-s Nam	6	5	[7]
(Russia) D Matsukevich (Russia) V Rudnev	w/o
2	(Australia) J Kerr (France) F Martin

Semifinals
1	(Chinese Taipei) T Chen (Chinese Taipei) H-y Peng	6	6
3	(Chinese Taipei) H-h Lee (China) Z Zhang	4	3
(China) M Gong (Japan) H Kondo	3	4
2	(Australia) J Kerr (France) F Martin	6	6

Final
1	(Chinese Taipei) T Chen (Chinese Taipei) H-y Peng	6	3	[12]
2	(Australia) J Kerr (France) F Martin	2	6	[10]
