= 2015 ATP Challenger China International – Nanchang – Doubles =

Nanchang – Doubles
- 2015 ATP Challenger China International – Nanchang

Final
- Champions: (France) Jonathan Eysseric (Estonia) Jürgen Zopp
- Runners-up: (Chinese Taipei) Lee Hsin-han (Israel) Amir Weintraub
- Score: 6–4, 6–2

Events
Singles	Doubles
← 2014 ·	ATP Challenger China International – Nanchang	· 2016 →

Chen Ti and Peng Hsien-yin are the defending champions, but only Chen defended his title partnering Huang Liang-chi.

== Seeds ==
1. (Italy) Riccardo Ghedin / (Japan) Toshihide Matsui (first round)
2. (Chinese Taipei) Hsieh Cheng-peng / (Australia) Andrew Whittington (quarterfinals)
3. (Chinese Taipei) Chen Ti / (Chinese Taipei) Huang Liang-chi (semifinals)
4. (Colombia) Nicolás Barrientos / (Argentina) Marco Trungelliti (first round)

== Draw ==
=== Key ===
- Q = Qualifier
- WC = Wild card
- LL = Lucky loser
- Alt = Alternate
- SE = Special exempt
- PR = Protected ranking
- ITF = ITF entry
- JE = Junior exempt
- w/o = Walkover
- r = Retired
- d = Defaulted
- SR = Special ranking

First round
1	(Italy) R Ghedin (Japan) T Matsui	4	4
(China) Y Bai (Japan) T Niki	6	6
PR	(Chinese Taipei) H-h Lee (Israel) A Weintraub	6	6
(Mexico) H Hach Verdugo (United States) A Sarkissian	3	3
4	(Colombia) N Barrientos (Argentina) M Trungelliti	3	5
(Australia) D Propoggia (Australia) J Thompson	6	7
(Italy) T Fabbiano (Italy) L Vanni	6	7
(Chinese Taipei) T-h Yang (Chinese Taipei) C-h Yi	4	5
(Germany) P Gojowczyk (Australia) Gavin van Peperzeel	5	6	[7]
WC	(Russia) D Medvedev (China) Z Zhang	7	3	[10]
(India) S Balaji (Japan) H Moriya	3	6	[8]
3	(Chinese Taipei) T Chen (Chinese Taipei) L-c Huang	6	4	[10]
WC	(China) He Feng (China) Yuqing Ning	3	6^{2}
(France) J Eysseric (Estonia) J Zopp	6	7^{7}
WC	(China) Y He (China) Zhuoyang Qiu	2	3
2	(Chinese Taipei) C-p Hsieh (Australia) A Whittington	6	6

Quarterfinals
(China) Y Bai (Japan) T Niki	3	6	[7]
PR	(Chinese Taipei) H-h Lee (Israel) A Weintraub	6	2	[10]
(Australia) D Propoggia (Australia) J Thompson	6	6
(Italy) T Fabbiano (Italy) L Vanni	3	4
(Russia) D Medvedev (China) Z Zhang	2	3
3	(Chinese Taipei) T Chen (Chinese Taipei) L-c Huang	6	6
(France) J Eysseric (Estonia) J Zopp	7^{7}	6
2	(Chinese Taipei) C-p Hsieh (Australia) A Whittington	6^{5}	1

Semifinals
PR	(Chinese Taipei) H-h Lee (Israel) A Weintraub	6	7^{7}
(Australia) D Propoggia (Australia) J Thompson	1	6^{3}
3	(Chinese Taipei) T Chen (Chinese Taipei) L-c Huang	7^{7}	6^{7}	[3]
(France) J Eysseric (Estonia) J Zopp	6^{3}	7^{9}	[10]

Final
PR	(Chinese Taipei) H-h Lee (Israel) A Weintraub	4	2
(France) J Eysseric (Estonia) J Zopp	6	6
