= 2016 ATP Challenger China International – Nanchang – Doubles =

Nanchang – Doubles
- 2016 ATP Challenger China International – Nanchang

Final
- Champions: (China) Wu Di (China) Zhang Zhizhen
- Runners-up: (Colombia) Nicolás Barrientos (Philippines) Ruben Gonzales
- Score: 7–6^{(7–4)}, 6–3

Events
Singles	Doubles
- ATP Challenger China International – Nanchang

Jonathan Eysseric and Jürgen Zopp were the defending champions but only Zopp chose to defend his title, partnering Matija Pecotić. Pecotić and Zopp lost in the first round to Chen Ti and Jason Jung.

Wu Di and Zhang Zhizhen won the title after defeating Nicolás Barrientos and Ruben Gonzales 7–6^{(7–4)}, 6–3 in the final.

== Seeds ==
1. (Belarus) Sergey Betov / (Ukraine) Denys Molchanov (quarterfinals)
2. (China) Gong Maoxin / (China) Zhang Ze (first round)
3. (Chinese Taipei) Hsieh Cheng-peng / (Chinese Taipei) Yi Chu-huan (first round)
4. (Australia) Jarryd Chaplin / (Australia) Jordan Thompson (first round)

== Draw ==
Key

- Q = Qualifier
- WC = Wild card
- LL = Lucky loser
- Alt = Alternate
- ITF = ITF entry
- PR = Protected ranking
- SR = Special ranking
- SE = Special exempt
- JE = Junior exempt
- JR = Junior Accelerator Programme entrant
- CO = College Accelerator Programme entrant
- NG = Next Gen Accelerator Program entrant
- w/o = Walkover
- r = Retired
- d = Defaulted

First round
1	(Belarus) S Betov (Ukraine) D Molchanov	6	4	[10]
WC	(China) Y Ning (China) Z Qiu	2	6	6
WC	(China) A Wang (China) Wu Hao	6	3	[4]
(Colombia) N Barrientos (Philippines) R Gonzales	4	6	[10]
3	(Chinese Taipei) C-p Hsieh (Chinese Taipei) C-h Yi	3	5
(Japan) T Matsui (Japan) Y Uchiyama	6	7
(India) J Nedunchezhiyan (Israel) A Weintraub	6	6
(Japan) Yuya Kibi (Japan) H Moriya	3	2
(China) X Gao (China) Z Li	6	6
WC	(China) Y He (China) R Te	1	4
(China) D Wu (China) Zh Zhang	6	6
4	(Australia) Jarryd Chaplin (Australia) J Thompson	4	4
(Croatia) M Pecotić (Estonia) J Zopp	5	2
(Chinese Taipei) T Chen (Chinese Taipei) J Jung	7	6
(Russia) A Karatsev (Italy) L Vanni	6	6
2	(China) M Gong (China) Ze Zhang	4	4

Quarterfinals
1	(Belarus) S Betov (Ukraine) D Molchanov	3	3
(Colombia) N Barrientos (Philippines) R Gonzales	6	6
(Japan) T Matsui (Japan) Y Uchiyama	4	7^{7}	[6]
(India) J Nedunchezhiyan (Israel) A Weintraub	6	6^{5}	[10]
(China) X Gao (China) Z Li	5	6	[7]
(China) D Wu (China) Zh Zhang	7	4	[10]
(Chinese Taipei) T Chen (Chinese Taipei) J Jung	6	6
(Russia) A Karatsev (Italy) L Vanni	3	4

Semifinals
(Colombia) N Barrientos (Philippines) R Gonzales	7	2	[10]
(India) J Nedunchezhiyan (Israel) A Weintraub	5	6	[4]
(China) D Wu (China) Zh Zhang	7	7^{7}
(Chinese Taipei) T Chen (Chinese Taipei) J Jung	5	6^{2}

Final
(Colombia) N Barrientos (Philippines) R Gonzales	6^{4}	3
(China) D Wu (China) Zh Zhang	7^{7}	6
