= 2018 ATP Challenger China International – Nanchang – Singles =

Nanchang – Singles
- 2018 ATP Challenger China International – Nanchang

Final
- Champion: (France) Quentin Halys
- Runner-up: (France) Calvin Hemery
- Score: 6–3, 6–2

Events
Singles	Doubles
← 2016 ·	ATP Challenger China International – Nanchang	· 2019 →

Hiroki Moriya was the defending champion but chose not to defend his title.

Quentin Halys won the title after defeating Calvin Hemery 6–3, 6–2 in the final.

== Seeds ==
1. (Russia) Evgeny Donskoy (quarterfinals)
2. (Australia) Jordan Thompson (semifinals)
3. (France) Quentin Halys (champion)
4. (India) Ramkumar Ramanathan (quarterfinals)
5. (France) Calvin Hemery (final)
6. (Japan) Go Soeda (first round)
7. (Japan) Tatsuma Ito (first round)
8. (Australia) Alex Bolt (second round)

== Draw ==
=== Key ===
- Q = Qualifier
- WC = Wild card
- LL = Lucky loser
- Alt = Alternate
- SE = Special exempt
- PR = Protected ranking
- ITF = ITF entry
- JE = Junior exempt
- w/o = Walkover
- r = Retired
- d = Defaulted
- SR = Special ranking

=== Finals ===
Semifinals
5	(France) Calvin Hemery	6	6
(Kazakhstan) Aleksandr Nedovyesov	3	4
3	(France) Quentin Halys	6	6
2	(Australia) Jordan Thompson	1	3

Final
5	(France) Calvin Hemery	3	2
3	(France) Quentin Halys	6	6

=== Top half ===
First round
1	(Russia) E Donskoy	6	6
WC	(China) Y He	2	2
(Chinese Taipei) T-h Yang	0	7^{7}	6
(Lithuania) L Grigelis	6	6^{5}	3
WC	(China) Xia Zihao	4	2
Q	(France) A Escoffier	6	6
(Australia) A Whittington	5	3
5	(France) C Hemery	7	6
4	(India) R Ramanathan	4	6	6
WC	(China) Y Wu	6	2	3
(Czech Republic) V Šafránek	7^{8}	6
(China) D Wu	6^{6}	2
(South Africa) L Harris	4	2
(Kazakhstan) A Nedovyesov	6	6
Q	(South Korea) Y-s Chung	6	7^{7}
7	(Japan) T Ito	4	6^{1}

Second round
1	(Russia) E Donskoy	6^{2}	6	7^{7}
(Chinese Taipei) T-h Yang	7^{7}	3	6^{3}
Q	(France) A Escoffier	4	1
5	(France) C Hemery	6	6
4	(India) R Ramanathan	7	6
(Czech Republic) V Šafránek	5	1
(Kazakhstan) A Nedovyesov	6	6
Q	(South Korea) Y-s Chung	4	2

Quarterfinals
1	(Russia) E Donskoy	3	3
5	(France) C Hemery	6	6
4	(India) R Ramanathan	2	5
(Kazakhstan) A Nedovyesov	6	7

Semifinals
5	(France) C Hemery	6	6
(Kazakhstan) A Nedovyesov	3	4

=== Bottom half ===
First round
8	(Australia) A Bolt	6	6
(South Korea) S-w Kwon	2	3
(Turkey) C İlkel	4	4
(India) P Gunneswaran	6	6
WC	(China) X Gao	6	0
(China) Z Li	3	0^{r}
(Egypt) M Safwat	6^{5}	4
3	(France) Q Halys	7^{7}	6
6	(Japan) G Soeda	4	6^{4}
(Spain) R Ortega Olmedo	6	7^{7}
LL	(India) S Mukund	6	6
(China) Ze Zhang	4	4
(Poland) K Majchrzak	5	2
Q	(France) H Grenier	7	6
(South Korea) D-h Lee	2	1
2	(Australia) J Thompson	6	6

Second round
8	(Australia) A Bolt	6^{5}	1
(India) P Gunneswaran	7^{7}	6
WC	(China) X Gao	2	1
3	(France) Q Halys	6	6
(Spain) R Ortega Olmedo	6	6
LL	(India) S Mukund	4	2
Q	(France) H Grenier	1	4
2	(Australia) J Thompson	6	6

Quarterfinals
(India) P Gunneswaran	4	3
3	(France) Q Halys	6	6
(Spain) R Ortega Olmedo	6	2	2
2	(Australia) J Thompson	4	6	6

Semifinals
3	(France) Q Halys	6	6
2	(Australia) J Thompson	1	3
