= 2016 ATP Challenger China International – Nanchang – Singles =

Nanchang – Singles
- 2016 ATP Challenger China International – Nanchang

Final
- Champion: (Japan) Hiroki Moriya
- Runner-up: (South Korea) Chung Hyeon
- Score: 4–6, 6–1, 6–4

Events
Singles	Doubles
← 2015 ·	ATP Challenger China International – Nanchang	· 2018 →

Peter Gojowczyk was the defending champion but chose not to defend his title.

Hiroki Moriya won the title after defeating Chung Hyeon 4–6, 6–1, 6–4 in the final.

== Seeds ==
1. (Chinese Taipei) Lu Yen-hsun (second round)
2. (Australia) Jordan Thompson (quarterfinals)
3. (Japan) Tatsuma Ito (second round)
4. (South Korea) Chung Hyeon (final)
5. (Italy) Luca Vanni (second round)
6. (Chinese Taipei) Jason Jung (semifinals)
7. (Russia) Alexander Kudryavtsev (second round)
8. (China) Zhang Ze (quarterfinals)

== Draw ==
=== Key ===
- Q = Qualifier
- WC = Wild card
- LL = Lucky loser
- Alt = Alternate
- SE = Special exempt
- PR = Protected ranking
- ITF = ITF entry
- JE = Junior exempt
- w/o = Walkover
- r = Retired
- d = Defaulted
- SR = Special ranking

=== Finals ===
Semifinals
(Australia) Marinko Matosevic	1	6^{5}
(Japan) Hiroki Moriya	6	7^{7}
4	(South Korea) Chung Hyeon	6	6
6	(Chinese Taipei) Jason Jung	3	4

Final
(Japan) Hiroki Moriya	4	6	6
4	(South Korea) Chung Hyeon	6	1	4

=== Top half ===
First round
1	(Chinese Taipei) Y-h Lu	3	6	6
(Chinese Taipei) T Chen	6	4	3
(Colombia) N Barrientos	4	4
(Australia) M Matosevic	6	6
(South Korea) D-h Lee	6	5	3
Q	(China) Xia Zihao	1	7	6
(China) D Wu	6	2	3
8	(China) Ze Zhang	3	6	6
3	(Japan) T Ito	6	1	7^{8}
Q	(Japan) Shuichi Sekiguchi	3	6	6^{6}
(Japan) H Moriya	6	6
PR	(Croatia) M Pecotić	4	4
(Estonia) J Zopp	3	1
(United States) A Sarkissian	6	6
WC	(China) F Sun	6	3	4
7	(Russia) A Kudryavtsev	3	6	6

Second round
1	(Chinese Taipei) Y-h Lu	5	6	4
(Australia) M Matosevic	7	0	6
Q	(China) Z Xia	2	3
8	(China) Ze Zhang	6	6
3	(Japan) T Ito	4	0
(Japan) H Moriya	6	6
(United States) A Sarkissian	6	7^{8}
7	(Russia) A Kudryavtsev	3	6^{6}

Quarterfinals
(Australia) M Matosevic	7^{7}	4	6
8	(China) Ze Zhang	6^{4}	6	4
(Japan) H Moriya	6	7
(United States) A Sarkissian	1	5

Semifinals
(Australia) M Matosevic	1	6^{5}
(Japan) H Moriya	6	7^{6}

=== Bottom half ===
First round
5	(Italy) L Vanni	6	0
Q	(Ukraine) D Molchanov	0	1^{r}
(Slovenia) B Kavčič	6	6
(Israel) A Weintraub	4	3
(Russia) A Karatsev	6	7^{7}
(Japan) Yuya Kibi	3	6^{4}
Q	(Belarus) S Betov	0	2
4	(South Korea) H Chung	6	6
6	(Chinese Taipei) J Jung	6	6
WC	(China) Y He	2	3
(Japan) Y Uchiyama	6	7
(China) Z Li	4	5
WC	(China) Zh Zhang	7	3	6
(Australia) B Mott	5	6	1
WC	(China) R Te	4	3
2	(Australia) J Thompson	6	6

Second round
5	(Italy) L Vanni	5	2
(Slovenia) B Kavčič	7	6
(Russia) A Karatsev	3	3
4	(South Korea) H Chung	6	6
6	(Chinese Taipei) J Jung	6	7^{7}
(Japan) Y Uchiyama	3	6^{3}
WC	(China) Zh Zhang	1	4
2	(Australia) J Thompson	6	6

Quarterfinals
(Slovenia) B Kavčič	6	3	4
4	(South Korea) H Chung	4	6	6
6	(Chinese Taipei) J Jung	7^{7}	6
2	(Australia) J Thompson	6^{4}	3

Semifinals
4	(South Korea) H Chung	6	6
6	(Chinese Taipei) J Jung	3	4
