= 2015 ATP Challenger China International – Nanchang – Singles =

Nanchang – Singles
- 2015 ATP Challenger China International – Nanchang

Final
- Champion: (Germany) Peter Gojowczyk
- Runner-up: (Israel) Amir Weintraub
- Score: 6–2, 6–1

Events
Singles	Doubles
- ATP Challenger China International – Nanchang

Go Soeda was the defending champion.

== Seeds ==
1. (Chinese Taipei) Lu Yen-hsun (withdrew, due to lower back injury)
2. (Japan) Go Soeda (first round)
3. (Italy) Luca Vanni (second round)
4. (Estonia) Jürgen Zopp (quarterfinals)
5. (Germany) Peter Gojowczyk (champion)
6. (Japan) Yūichi Sugita (second round)
7. (Italy) Thomas Fabbiano (semifinals)
8. (Australia) Jordan Thompson (semifinals)

== Draw ==
Key

- Q = Qualifier
- WC = Wild card
- LL = Lucky loser
- Alt = Alternate
- ITF = ITF entry
- PR = Protected ranking
- SR = Special ranking
- SE = Special exempt
- JE = Junior exempt
- JR = Junior Accelerator Programme entrant
- CO = College Accelerator Programme entrant
- NG = Next Gen Accelerator Program entrant
- w/o = Walkover
- r = Retired
- d = Defaulted

=== Finals ===
Semifinals
7	(Italy) Thomas Fabbiano	6	6^{4}	6^{2}
5	(Germany) Peter Gojowczyk	3	7^{7}	7^{7}
8	(Australia) Jordan Thompson	3	4
PR	(Israel) Amir Weintraub	6	6

Final
5	(Germany) Peter Gojowczyk	6	6
PR	(Israel) Amir Weintraub	2	1

=== Top half ===
First round
(Chinese Taipei) T Chen	1	4
Q	(New Zealand) F Tearney	6	6
(France) J Tatlot	4	6^{5}
(United States) A Sarkissian	6	7^{7}
WC	(China) Zhuoyang Qiu	3	2
WC	(China) Y He	6	6
(Japan) H Moriya	3	6	4
7	(Italy) T Fabbiano	6	0	6
3	(Italy) L Vanni	6	6
(Chinese Taipei) L-c Huang	4	3
WC	(China) Zhicheng Zhu	1^{r}
(United States) N Meister	4
Q	(India) J Nedunchezhiyan	6	4	6
(Australia) Gavin van Peperzeel	1	6	3
LL	(Australia) D Propoggia	4	5
5	(Germany) P Gojowczyk	6	7

Second round
Q	(New Zealand) F Tearney	1	2
(United States) A Sarkissian	6	6
WC	(China) Y He	6	3	2
7	(Italy) T Fabbiano	4	6	6
3	(Italy) L Vanni	6	4	3
(United States) N Meister	4	6	6
Q	(India) J Nedunchezhiyan	4	0
5	(Germany) P Gojowczyk	6	6

Quarterfinals
(United States) A Sarkissian	1	4
7	(Italy) T Fabbiano	6	6
(United States) N Meister	2	2
5	(Germany) P Gojowczyk	6	6

Semifinals
7	(Italy) T Fabbiano	6	6^{4}	6^{2}
5	(Germany) P Gojowczyk	3	7^{7}	7^{7}

=== Bottom half ===
First round
8	(Australia) J Thompson	6	6
SE	(Russia) D Medvedev	1	4
(Colombia) N Barrientos	6	2	6
Q	(India) S Balaji	3	6	1
(Chinese Taipei) T-h Yang	6	6
(Japan) T Niki	4	3
(South Korea) D-h Lee	6^{2}	1
4	(Estonia) J Zopp	7^{7}	6
6	(Japan) Y Sugita	6	6
(France) J Eysseric	3	3
(China) Y Bai	6	6
WC	(China) Yuqing Ning	3	3
(Argentina) M Trungelliti	1	6	1
Q	(Italy) R Ghedin	6	0	6
PR	(Israel) A Weintraub	6	6
2	(Japan) G Soeda	2	1

Second round
8	(Australia) J Thompson	7^{7}	6
(Colombia) N Barrientos	6^{5}	2
(Chinese Taipei) T-h Yang	7	4	2
4	(Estonia) J Zopp	5	6	6
6	(Japan) Y Sugita	4	3
(China) Y Bai	6	6
Q	(Italy) R Ghedin	4	6^{3}
PR	(Israel) A Weintraub	6	7^{7}

Quarterfinals
8	(Australia) J Thompson	6	3	6
4	(Estonia) J Zopp	1	6	0
(China) Y Bai
PR	(Israel) A Weintraub	w/o

Semifinals
8	(Australia) J Thompson	3	4
PR	(Israel) A Weintraub	6	6
