= 2018 Loughborough Trophy =

- Date: 21–27 May
- Edition: 1st
- Surface: Hard (indoor)
- Location: Loughborough, United Kingdom

Champions

Singles
- (Japan) Hiroki Moriya

Doubles
- (Denmark) Frederik Nielsen / (United Kingdom) Joe Salisbury
Loughborough Trophy

The 2018 Loughborough Trophy was a professional tennis tournament played on indoor hard courts. It was the first edition of the tournament which was part of the 2018 ATP Challenger Tour. It took place in Loughborough, United Kingdom between 21 and 27 May 2018.

== Singles main-draw entrants ==
=== Seeds ===
Country	Player	Rank^{1}	Seed
SVK	Lukáš Lacko	99	1
AUS	Max Purcell	218	2
USA	Christian Harrison	220	3
BIH	Aldin Šetkić	251	4
CRO	Ante Pavić	266	5
TUR	Cem İlkel	276	6
FRA	David Guez	277	7
JPN	Hiroki Moriya	285	8

- ^{1} Rankings are as of 14 May 2018.

=== Other entrants ===
The following players received wildcards into the singles main draw:

- (United Kingdom) Luke Bambridge
- (United Kingdom) Edward Corrie
- (United Kingdom) Lloyd Glasspool
- (United Kingdom) James Ward

The following player received entry into the singles main draw as a special exempt:

- (Japan) Yosuke Watanuki

The following player received entry into the singles main draw using a protected ranking:

- (Germany) Daniel Brands

The following players received entry from the qualifying draw:

- (United Kingdom) Dan Evans
- (Denmark) Frederik Nielsen
- (Austria) Jurij Rodionov
- (Finland) Emil Ruusuvuori

== Champions ==
=== Singles ===
- (Japan) Hiroki Moriya def. (United Kingdom) James Ward 6–2, 7–5.

=== Doubles ===
- (Denmark) Frederik Nielsen / (United Kingdom) Joe Salisbury def. (United Kingdom) Luke Bambridge / (United Kingdom) Jonny O'Mara 3–6, 6–3, [10–4].
