= 2019 ATP Challenger China International – Nanchang – Doubles =

Nanchang – Doubles
- 2019 ATP Challenger China International – Nanchang

Final
- Champions: (Netherlands) Sander Arends (Austria) Tristan-Samuel Weissborn
- Runners-up: (Australia) Alex Bolt (Australia) Akira Santillan
- Score: 6–2, 6–4

Events
Singles	Doubles
- ATP Challenger China International – Nanchang

Gong Maoxin and Zhang Ze were the defending champions but chose not to defend their title.

Sander Arends and Tristan-Samuel Weissborn won the title after defeating Alex Bolt and Akira Santillan 6–2, 6–4 in the final.

== Seeds ==
1. (India) Sriram Balaji / (United States) James Cerretani (quarterfinals)
2. (Netherlands) Sander Arends / (Austria) Tristan-Samuel Weissborn (champions)
3. (Australia) Max Purcell / (Australia) Luke Saville (semifinals)
4. (Netherlands) David Pel / (Chile) Hans Podlipnik Castillo (semifinals)

== Draw ==
Key

- Q = Qualifier
- WC = Wild card
- LL = Lucky loser
- Alt = Alternate
- ITF = ITF entry
- PR = Protected ranking
- SR = Special ranking
- SE = Special exempt
- JE = Junior exempt
- JR = Junior Accelerator Programme entrant
- CO = College Accelerator Programme entrant
- NG = Next Gen Accelerator Program entrant
- w/o = Walkover
- r = Retired
- d = Defaulted

First round
1	(India) S Balaji (United States) J Cerretani	6	6
(China) R Te (China) D Wu	2	4
ITF	(China) Y Bai (China) F Sun	4	2
(Australia) A Bolt (Australia) A Santillan	6	6
3	(Australia) M Purcell (Australia) L Saville	7	6
PR	(Colombia) N Barrientos (Philippines) R Gonzales	5	1
(Slovakia) A Martin (Japan) T Matsui	6	6
(China) J Cui (China) Y He	3	2
(China) X Gao (China) Zh Zhang	6^{5}	4
(Russia) T Gabashvili (Belarus) U Ignatik	7^{7}	6
(Serbia) N Milojević (Portugal) G Oliveira	4	4
4	(Netherlands) D Pel (Chile) H Podlipnik Castillo	6	6
ITF	(Australia) M Banes (Australia) Jacob Grills	6	6
(Spain) E López Pérez (Switzerland) L Margaroli	3	2
(India) R Ramanathan (India) V Vardhan	4	5
2	(Netherlands) S Arends (Austria) T-S Weissborn	6	7

Quarterfinals
1	(India) S Balaji (United States) J Cerretani	4	3
(Australia) A Bolt (Australia) A Santillan	6	6
3	(Australia) M Purcell (Australia) L Saville	6	3	[14]
(Slovakia) A Martin (Japan) T Matsui	3	6	[12]
(Russia) T Gabashvili (Belarus) U Ignatik	6^{3}	3
4	(Netherlands) D Pel (Chile) H Podlipnik Castillo	7^{7}	6
ITF	(Australia) M Banes (Australia) J Grills	3	3
2	(Netherlands) S Arends (Austria) T-S Weissborn	6	6

Semifinals
(Australia) A Bolt (Australia) A Santillan	6	4	[10]
3	(Australia) M Purcell (Australia) L Saville	4	6	[7]
4	(Netherlands) D Pel (Chile) H Podlipnik Castillo	4	2
2	(Netherlands) S Arends (Austria) T-S Weissborn	6	6

Final
(Australia) A Bolt (Australia) A Santillan	2	4
2	(Netherlands) S Arends (Austria) T-S Weissborn	6	6
