= 2019 ATP Challenger China International – Nanchang – Singles =

Nanchang – Singles
- 2019 ATP Challenger China International – Nanchang

Final
- Champion: (Slovakia) Andrej Martin
- Runner-up: (Australia) Jordan Thompson
- Score: 6–4, 1–6, 6–3

Events
| Singles | Doubles |
- ATP Challenger China International – Nanchang

Quentin Halys was the defending champion but chose not to defend his title.

Andrej Martin won the title after defeating Jordan Thompson 6–4, 1–6, 6–3 in the final.

== Seeds ==
All seeds receive a bye into the second round.

1. (Australia) Jordan Thompson (final)
2. (India) Prajnesh Gunneswaran (withdrew)
3. (Australia) Alex Bolt (second round)
4. (India) Ramkumar Ramanathan (semifinals)
5. (Australia) James Duckworth (third round)
6. (Australia) Jason Kubler (second round)
7. (Serbia) Nikola Milojević (semifinals)
8. (Spain) Enrique López Pérez (third round)
9. (Kazakhstan) Aleksandr Nedovyesov (second round)
10. (France) Maxime Janvier (second round, retired)
11. (Japan) Go Soeda (quarterfinals)
12. (United Kingdom) Jay Clarke (third round)
13. (Czech Republic) Adam Pavlásek (third round)
14. (South Korea) Lee Duck-hee (second round)
15. (Belarus) Uladzimir Ignatik (second round)
16. (Japan) Kaichi Uchida (third round)

== Draw ==
Key

- Q = Qualifier
- WC = Wild card
- LL = Lucky loser
- Alt = Alternate
- ITF = ITF entry
- PR = Protected ranking
- SR = Special ranking
- SE = Special exempt
- JE = Junior exempt
- JR = Junior Accelerator Programme entrant
- CO = College Accelerator Programme entrant
- NG = Next Gen Accelerator Program entrant
- w/o = Walkover
- r = Retired
- d = Defaulted

=== Finals ===
Quarterfinals
1 | (Australia) Jordan Thompson | 6^{4} | 6 | 6
11 | (Japan) Go Soeda | 7^{7} | 4 | 3
4 | (India) Ramkumar Ramanathan | 6 | 6
(China) Zhang Zhizhen | 3 | 0
Alt | (Israel) Ben Patael | 2 | 5
(Slovakia) Andrej Martin | 6 | 7
7 | (Serbia) Nikola Milojević | 6 | 4 | 6
(Australia) Andrew Harris | 2 | 6 | 0

Semifinals
1 | (Australia) Jordan Thompson | 7^{7} | 6
4 | (India) Ramkumar Ramanathan | 6^{2} | 3
(Slovakia) Andrej Martin | 6 | 6
7 | (Serbia) Nikola Milojević | 0 | 4

Final
1 | (Australia) Jordan Thompson | 4 | 6 | 3
(Slovakia) Andrej Martin | 6 | 1 | 6

=== Top half ===
==== Section 1 ====
First round
(Australia) L Saville | 3 | 4
ITF | (Australia) Jacob Grills | 6 | 6
Q | (China) Wu Hao | 6 | 1 | 3
(Czech Republic) V Šafránek | 3 | 6 | 6
ITF | (China) Y Bai | 6 | 2 | 6^{4}
(India) S Balaji | 2 | 6 | 7^{7}
(China) D Wu | 6 | 6
WC | (China) J Cui | 1 | 2

Second round
1 | (Australia) J Thompson | 6 | 4 | 6
ITF | (Australia) J Grills | 3 | 6 | 1
(Czech Republic) V Šafránek | 7^{8} | 6
15 | (Belarus) U Ignatik | 6^{6} | 4
11 | (Japan) G Soeda | 6 | 6
(India) S Balaji | 4 | 4
(China) D Wu | 6^{9} | 3
5 | (Australia) J Duckworth | 7^{11} | 6

Third round
1 | (Australia) J Thompson | 6 | 6
(Czech Republic) V Šafránek | 2 | 1
11 | (Japan) G Soeda | 7 | 6
5 | (Australia) J Duckworth | 5 | 1

Quarterfinals
1 | (Australia) J Thompson | 6^{4} | 6 | 6
11 | (Japan) G Soeda | 7^{7} | 4 | 3

==== Section 2 ====
First round
WC | (China) F Sun | 4 | 4
WC | (China) R Te | 6 | 6
(China) Xia Zihao | 2 | 5
ITF | (Russia) T Gabashvili | 6 | 7
(India) S Myneni | 4 | 4
(China) Zh Zhang | 6 | 6
(Chinese Taipei) T-l Wu | 3 | 2
(Japan) Makoto Ochi | 6 | 6

Second round
4 | (India) R Ramanathan | 6 | 6
WC | (China) R Te | 3 | 2
ITF | (Russia) T Gabashvili | 4 | 6 | 3
16 | (Japan) K Uchida | 6 | 2 | 6
10 | (France) M Janvier | 6^{5} | 1^{r}
(China) Zh Zhang | 7^{7} | 2
(Japan) M Ochi | 3 | 0
8 | (Spain) E López Pérez | 6 | 6

Third round
4 | (India) R Ramanathan | 6 | 6
16 | (Japan) K Uchida | 2 | 3
(China) Zh Zhang | 6 | 6
8 | (Spain) E López Pérez | 2 | 4

Quarterfinals
4 | (India) R Ramanathan | 6 | 6
(China) Zh Zhang | 3 | 0

=== Bottom half ===
==== Section 3 ====
First round
Alt | (Israel) B Patael | 6 | 6
WC | (China) X Gao | 1 | 4
WC | (China) Y He | 6^{2} | 2
(Australia) M Purcell | 7^{7} | 6
(Portugal) G Oliveira | 6 | 6
(Australia) M Banes | 4 | 3
(Slovakia) A Martin | 6 | 6
(France) T Lamasine | 2 | 2

Second round
6 | (Australia) J Kubler | 1 | 6 | 5
Alt | (Israel) B Patael | 6 | 4 | 7
(Australia) M Purcell | 6^{2} | 3
12 | (United Kingdom) J Clarke | 7^{7} | 6
14 | (South Korea) D-h Lee | 3 | 2
(Portugal) G Oliveira | 6 | 6
(Slovakia) A Martin | 6 | 6
3 | (Australia) A Bolt | 2 | 4

Third round
Alt | (Israel) B Patael | 6 | 7
12 | (United Kingdom) J Clarke | 3 | 5
(Portugal) G Oliveira | 4 | 2
(Slovakia) A Martin | 6 | 6

Quarterfinals
Alt | (Israel) B Patael | 2 | 5
(Slovakia) A Martin | 6 | 7

==== Section 4 ====
First round
(India) S Mukund | 6 | 3
(Japan) Renta Tokuda | 1 | 1^{r}
(Australia) A Santillan | 6 | 6
(Chinese Taipei) Lo Chien-hsun | 1 | 2
ITF | (Japan) R Noguchi | 4 | 3
(South Korea) Y-s Chung | 6 | 6
Q | (Switzerland) L Margaroli | 1 | 2
(Australia) A Harris | 6 | 6

Second round
7 | (Serbia) N Milojević | 6 | 6
(India) S Mukund | 2 | 4
(Australia) A Santillan | 6 | 4 | 7
9 | (Kazakhstan) A Nedovyesov | 4 | 6 | 5
13 | (Czech Republic) A Pavlásek | 6 | 6
(South Korea) Y-s Chung | 3 | 2
(Australia) A Harris | 6 | 6
Alt | (India) V Vardhan | 2 | 3

Third round
7 | (Serbia) N Milojević | 7^{7} | 7^{7}
(Australia) A Santillan | 6^{2} | 6^{5}
13 | (Czech Republic) A Pavlásek | 3 | 6 | 3
(Australia) A Harris | 6 | 4 | 6

Quarterfinals
7 | (Serbia) N Milojević | 6 | 4 | 6
(Australia) A Harris | 2 | 6 | 0
