= 2018 Loughborough Trophy – Doubles =

Doubles
- 2018 Loughborough Trophy

Final
- Champions: (Denmark) Frederik Nielsen (United Kingdom) Joe Salisbury
- Runners-up: (United Kingdom) Luke Bambridge (United Kingdom) Jonny O'Mara
- Score: 3–6, 6–3, [10–4]

Events
Singles	Doubles
- Loughborough Trophy

This was the first edition of the tournament.

Frederik Nielsen and Joe Salisbury won the title after defeating Luke Bambridge and Jonny O'Mara 3–6, 6–3, [10–4] in the final.

== Seeds ==
1. (India) Jeevan Nedunchezhiyan / (Australia) Matt Reid (first round)
2. (Australia) Bradley Mousley / (Germany) Tim Pütz (semifinals)
3. (United Kingdom) Luke Bambridge / (United Kingdom) Jonny O'Mara (final)
4. (Denmark) Frederik Nielsen / (United Kingdom) Joe Salisbury (champions)

== Draw ==
Key

- Q = Qualifier
- WC = Wild card
- LL = Lucky loser
- Alt = Alternate
- ITF = ITF entry
- PR = Protected ranking
- SR = Special ranking
- SE = Special exempt
- JE = Junior exempt
- JR = Junior Accelerator Programme entrant
- CO = College Accelerator Programme entrant
- NG = Next Gen Accelerator Program entrant
- w/o = Walkover
- r = Retired
- d = Defaulted

First round
1	(India) J Nedunchezhiyan (Australia) M Reid	7^{9}	2	[8]
(United States) R Galloway (United States) N Lammons	6^{7}	6	[10]
WC	(United Kingdom) B Harris (United Kingdom) George Houghton	6^{6}	6	[12]
(Turkey) C İlkel (Bosnia and Herzegovina) A Šetkić	7^{8}	4	[14]
4	(Denmark) F Nielsen (United Kingdom) J Salisbury	6	6
(United Kingdom) S Clayton (United Kingdom) L Johnson	1	1
(Italy) J Ocleppo (Italy) A Vavassori	6	7^{7}
(France) D Guez (United Kingdom) M Willis	3	6^{4}
Alt	(United States) C Harrison (Israel) E Leshem	6	2	[7]
WC	(United Kingdom) S Duncan (United Kingdom) Isaac Stoute	3	6	[10]
(Australia) D Kelly (Australia) M Purcell	4	0
3	(United Kingdom) L Bambridge (United Kingdom) J O'Mara	6	6
(Australia) R Junaid (Netherlands) D Pel	5	7^{7}	[10]
(United States) A Lawson (Croatia) A Pavić	7	6^{5}	[6]
(Austria) L Miedler (Austria) M Neuchrist	3	2
2	(Australia) B Mousley (Germany) T Pütz	6	6

Quarterfinals
(United States) R Galloway (United States) N Lammons	w/o
(Turkey) C İlkel (Bosnia and Herzegovina) A Šetkić
4	(Denmark) F Nielsen (United Kingdom) J Salisbury	5	6	[10]
(Italy) J Ocleppo (Italy) A Vavassori	7	0	[8]
WC	(United Kingdom) S Duncan (United Kingdom) I Stoute	2	4
3	(United Kingdom) L Bambridge (United Kingdom) J O'Mara	6	6
(Australia) R Junaid (Netherlands) D Pel	4	4
2	(Australia) B Mousley (Germany) T Pütz	6	6

Semifinals
(United States) R Galloway (United States) N Lammons	6^{6}	6^{5}
4	(Denmark) F Nielsen (United Kingdom) J Salisbury	7^{8}	7^{7}
3	(United Kingdom) L Bambridge (United Kingdom) J O'Mara	6	6
2	(Australia) B Mousley (Germany) T Pütz	4	2

Final
4	(Denmark) F Nielsen (United Kingdom) J Salisbury	3	6	[10]
3	(United Kingdom) L Bambridge (United Kingdom) J O'Mara	6	3	[4]
