= 2018 Loughborough Trophy – Singles =

Singles
- 2018 Loughborough Trophy

Final
- Champion: (Japan) Hiroki Moriya
- Runner-up: (United Kingdom) James Ward
- Score: 6–2, 7–5

Events
Singles	Doubles
- Loughborough Trophy

This was the first edition of the tournament.

Hiroki Moriya won the title after defeating James Ward 6–2, 7–5 in the final.

== Seeds ==
1. (Slovakia) Lukáš Lacko (first round)
2. (Australia) Max Purcell (first round)
3. (United States) Christian Harrison (second round)
4. (Bosnia and Herzegovina) Aldin Šetkić (second round)
5. (Croatia) Ante Pavić (first round)
6. (Turkey) Cem İlkel (second round)
7. (France) David Guez (second round)
8. (Japan) Hiroki Moriya (champion)

== Draw ==
Key

- Q = Qualifier
- WC = Wild card
- LL = Lucky loser
- Alt = Alternate
- ITF = ITF entry
- PR = Protected ranking
- SR = Special ranking
- SE = Special exempt
- JE = Junior exempt
- JR = Junior Accelerator Programme entrant
- CO = College Accelerator Programme entrant
- NG = Next Gen Accelerator Program entrant
- w/o = Walkover
- r = Retired
- d = Defaulted

=== Finals ===
Semifinals
SE	(Japan) Yosuke Watanuki	6^{8}	2
8	(Japan) Hiroki Moriya	7^{10}	6
WC	(United Kingdom) James Ward	6	6
(Austria) Maximilian Neuchrist	1	4

Final
8	(Japan) Hiroki Moriya	6	7
WC	(United Kingdom) James Ward	2	5

=== Top half ===
First round
1	(Slovakia) L Lacko	3	5
SE	(Japan) Yo Watanuki	6	7
(France) Y Jankovits	7^{7}	6^{4}	2
(Spain) R Ortega Olmedo	6^{4}	7^{7}	6
(Israel) E Leshem	1	5
(Austria) L Miedler	6	7
Q	(Denmark) F Nielsen	2	4
7	(France) D Guez	6	6
4	(Bosnia and Herzegovina) A Šetkić	6	6
(Japan) K Uchida	3	2
(Australia) D Kelly	6	4	2
PR	(Germany) D Brands	4	6	6
(Germany) T Pütz	7^{7}	6
(Czech Republic) Marek Jaloviec	6^{4}	1
(United States) JC Aragone	4	3
8	(Japan) H Moriya	6	6

Second round
SE	(Japan) Yo Watanuki	7	6
(Spain) R Ortega Olmedo	5	4
(Austria) L Miedler	6	6
7	(France) D Guez	4	2
4	(Bosnia and Herzegovina) A Šetkić	3	2
PR	(Germany) D Brands	6	6
(Germany) T Pütz	5	0
8	(Japan) H Moriya	7	6

Quarterfinals
SE	(Japan) Yo Watanuki	7^{7}	7^{8}
(Austria) L Miedler	6^{5}	6^{6}
PR	(Germany) D Brands	1	6^{3}
8	(Japan) H Moriya	6	7^{7}

Semifinals
SE	(Japan) Yo Watanuki	6^{8}	2
8	(Japan) H Moriya	7^{10}	6

=== Bottom half ===
First round
5	(Croatia) A Pavić	4	4
(Russia) T Gabashvili	6	6
Q	(Finland) E Ruusuvuori	6	6
(Australia) B Mousley	1	4
WC	(United Kingdom) J Ward	7	6
WC	(United Kingdom) L Glasspool	5	1
(Italy) A Bega	3	6	1
3	(United States) C Harrison	6	1	6
6	(Turkey) C İlkel	6	6
WC	(United Kingdom) E Corrie	3	4
(United Kingdom) A Ward	6^{3}	6^{4}
(Austria) M Neuchrist	7^{7}	7^{7}
Q	(Austria) J Rodionov	7	6
WC	(United Kingdom) L Bambridge	5	4
Q	(United Kingdom) D Evans	6	6
2	(Australia) M Purcell	4	2

Second round
(Russia) T Gabashvili	6	7
Q	(Finland) E Ruusuvuori	2	5
WC	(United Kingdom) J Ward	7^{7}	6
3	(United States) C Harrison	6^{2}	3
6	(Turkey) C İlkel	7^{7}	4	3
(Austria) M Neuchrist	6^{3}	6	6
Q	(Austria) J Rodionov	6	7
Q	(United Kingdom) D Evans	4	5

Quarterfinals
(Russia) T Gabashvili	5	4^{r}
WC	(United Kingdom) J Ward	7	5
(Austria) M Neuchrist	3	7^{8}	6
Q	(Austria) J Rodionov	6	6^{6}	3

Semifinals
WC	(United Kingdom) J Ward	6	6
(Austria) M Neuchrist	1	4
