= 2014 ATP Challenger China International – Nanchang =

- Date: 23–29 June
- Edition: 1st
- Draw: 32S / 16D
- Prize money: $50,000+H
- Surface: Hard
- Location: Nanchang, China

Champions

Singles
- (Japan) Go Soeda

Doubles
- (Chinese Taipei) Chen Ti / (Chinese Taipei) Peng Hsien-yin
ATP Challenger China International – Nanchang	· 2015 →

The 2014 ATP Challenger China International – Nanchang was a professional tennis tournament played on hard courts. It was the first edition of the tournament which was part of the 2014 ATP Challenger Tour. It took place in Nanchang, China between 23 and 29 June 2014.

== Singles main-draw entrants ==
=== Seeds ===
Country	Player	Rank^{1}	Seed
JPN	Go Soeda	100	1
SLO	Blaž Kavčič	122	2
RUS	Alexander Kudryavtsev	169	3
CHN	Zhang Ze	189	4
CHN	Wu Di	240	5
RUS	Valery Rudnev	249	6
FRA	Josselin Ouanna	264	7
KOR	Chung Hyeon	268	8

- ^{1} Rankings are as of June 16, 2014.

=== Other entrants ===
The following players received wildcards into the singles main draw:

- (China) Bai Yan
- (China) Liu Siyu
- (China) Ning Yuqing
- (China) Te Rigele

The following players received entry from the qualifying draw:

- (Japan) Kento Takeuchi
- (Russia) Mikhail Ledovskikh
- (Australia) Ryan Agar
- (China) Wang Chuhan

== Doubles main-draw entrants ==
=== Seeds ===
Country	Player	Country	Player	Rank^{1}	Seed
TPE	Chen Ti	TPE	Peng Hsien-yin	306	1
AUS	Jordan Kerr	FRA	Fabrice Martin	373	2
TPE	Lee Hsin-han	CHN	Zhang Ze	427	3
AUS	Ryan Agar	TPE	Huang Liang-chi	502	4

- ^{1} Rankings as of June 16, 2014.

=== Other entrants ===
The following pairs received wildcards into the doubles main draw:

- (China) Hua Runhao / (China) Liu Siyu
- (China) Chen Long / (China) Wu Hao
- (China) Ning Yuqing / (China) Wang Aoran

== Champions ==
=== Singles ===
- (Japan) Go Soeda def. (Slovenia) Blaž Kavčič, 6–3, 2–6, 7–6^{(7–3)}

=== Doubles ===
- (Chinese Taipei) Chen Ti / (Chinese Taipei) Peng Hsien-yin def. (Australia) Jordan Kerr / (France) Fabrice Martin, 6–2, 3–6, [12–10]
