= 2018 ATP Challenger China International – Nanchang =

- Date: 16–22 April
- Edition: 4th
- Draw: 32S / 16D
- Surface: Hard
- Location: Nanchang, China

Champions

Singles
- (France) Quentin Halys

Doubles
- (China) Gong Maoxin / (China) Zhang Ze
← 2016 ·	ATP Challenger China International – Nanchang	· 2019 →

The 2018 ATP Challenger China International – Nanchang was a professional tennis tournament played on hard courts. It was the fourth edition of the tournament which was part of the 2018 ATP Challenger Tour. It took place in Nanchang, China between 16 and 22 April 2018.

== Singles main-draw entrants ==
=== Seeds ===
Country	Player	Rank^{1}	Seed
RUS	Evgeny Donskoy	85	1
AUS	Jordan Thompson	99	2
FRA	Quentin Halys	116	3
IND	Ramkumar Ramanathan	133	4
FRA	Calvin Hemery	135	5
JPN	Go Soeda	153	6
JPN	Tatsuma Ito	155	7
AUS	Alex Bolt	179	8

- ^{1} Rankings are as of 9 April 2018.

=== Other entrants ===
The following players received wildcards into the singles main draw:

- (China) Gao Xin
- (China) He Yecong
- (China) Wu Yibing
- (China) Xia Zihao

The following players received entry from the qualifying draw:

- (South Korea) Chung Yun-seong
- (France) Antoine Escoffier
- (France) Hugo Grenier
- (Japan) Shuichi Sekiguchi

The following player received entry as a lucky loser:

- (India) Sasikumar Mukund

== Champions ==
=== Singles ===
- (France) Quentin Halys def. (France) Calvin Hemery 6–3, 6–2.

=== Doubles ===
- (China) Gong Maoxin / (China) Zhang Ze def. (Philippines) Ruben Gonzales / (Indonesia) Christopher Rungkat 3–6, 7–6^{(9–7)}, [10–7].
