= Joe Salisbury =

British tennis player (born 1992)

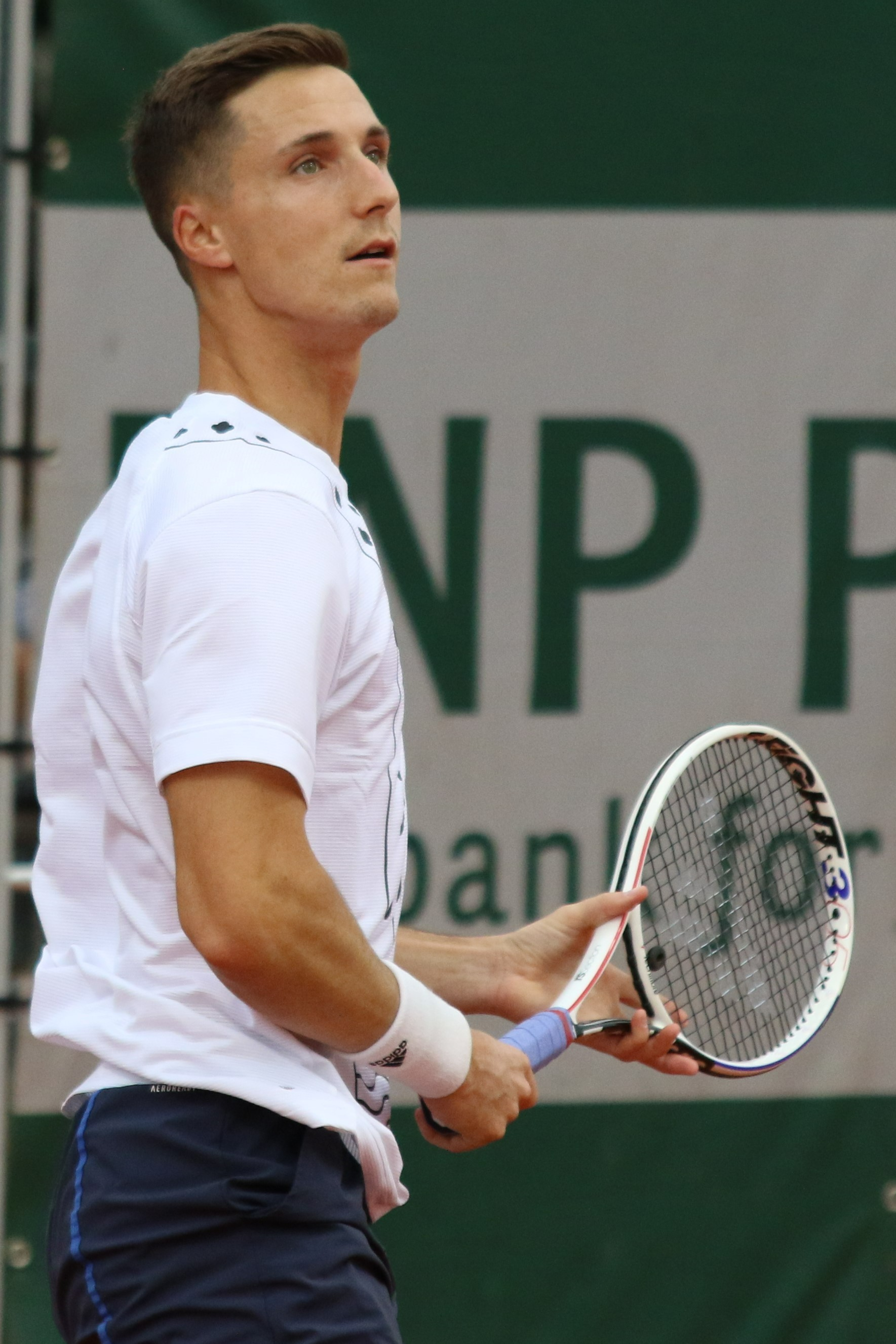
- Salisbury at the 2022 French Open
- Country (sports): United Kingdom; Great Britain
- Residence: London, England
- Born: 20 April 1992 (age 34) London, England
- Height: 1.91 m (6 ft 3 in)
- Turned pro: 2014
- Retired: 2026
- Plays: Right-handed (one handed-backhand)
- College: Memphis
- Coach: David O'Hare, Justin Sherring
- Prize money: US $7,087,318

Singles
- Career record: 0–0
- Highest ranking: No. 559 (12 October 2015)

Grand Slam singles results
- Wimbledon: Q2 (2016)

Doubles
- Career record: 286–163
- Career titles: 17
- Highest ranking: No. 1 (4 April 2022)

Grand Slam doubles results
- Australian Open: W (2020)
- French Open: F (2025)
- Wimbledon: SF (2018, 2021, 2022)
- US Open: W (2021, 2022, 2023)

Other doubles tournaments
- Tour Finals: W (2022, 2023)
- Olympic Games: QF (2020)

Mixed doubles
- Career record: 26–18
- Career titles: 2

Grand Slam mixed doubles results
- Australian Open: SF (2021)
- French Open: W (2021)
- Wimbledon: F (2021, 2025)
- US Open: W (2021)

Other mixed doubles tournaments
- Olympic Games: 1R (2024)
Medal record
Men's Tennis
Representing Great Britain
Summer Universiade
Gold medal – first place	2015 Gwangju	Men's Doubles

Joe Salisbury (/ˈsɔːlzbəri, ˈsɒlz-/ SAWLZ-bər-ee, SOLZ-; born 20 April 1992) is a British former professional tennis player who specialised in doubles. He has been ranked world No. 1 in doubles, by the ATP.

Salisbury is a six-time major champion, having won the 2020 Australian Open and the 2021, 2022 and 2023 US Opens in men's doubles with Rajeev Ram, as well as the 2021 French and US Opens in mixed doubles alongside Desirae Krawczyk. He also finished runner-up at the 2021 Australian Open in men's doubles and the 2021 Wimbledon Championships in mixed doubles, with Ram and Harriet Dart respectively. In April 2022, he became the third British world No. 1 in either singles or doubles, after Jamie and Andy Murray.

Salisbury has won 17 doubles titles on the ATP Tour, including the 2022 and 2023 ATP Finals and three at ATP 1000 level. He made his Davis Cup debut for Great Britain in 2021 and also competed at the 2020 Summer Olympics alongside Andy Murray.

== Early life ==
Salisbury is from Putney in southwest London. He went to King's College School, Wimbledon, leaving in 2010. He trained at the Sutton Tennis Centre under Jeremy Bates and played college tennis at the University of Memphis.

== College years ==
Salisbury represented the Memphis Tigers from 2010 until his graduation in 2014. As he had experienced injury problems during his junior career he was not heavily recruited by American colleges and the decision to offer him a spot at Memphis was a "gamble" on the part of head coach Paul Goebel.

Salisbury finished his college career with 97 doubles wins with his partner David O’Hare, the most in school history, and his 25 singles wins in his final year was also a Memphis record at the time.

== Professional career ==
=== 2014: ATP Tour debut ===
Salisbury made his ATP Tour main-draw debut at the U.S. National Indoor Championships partnering David O'Hare, losing to the Bryan brothers in the first round.

=== 2018: First ATP doubles title ===
He reached the semifinals in the Wimbledon men's doubles with Frederik Nielsen.

Playing alongside Ben McLachlan, he won his first ATP Tour doubles title at the Shenzhen Open.

=== 2019-20: New partnership, Australian Open doubles title, world No. 3 ===
At Wimbledon in 2019, he played alongside Rajeev Ram during the men's doubles. They made it to the round of 16.

Also with Ram, Salisbury won the 2020 Australian Open, beating wildcards Max Purcell and Luke Saville in the final.

=== 2021: French Open mixed-doubles, US Open doubles & mixed, first Masters titles ===
He competed in the Australian Open with partner Rajeev Ram to defend their title, but they lost to Ivan Dodig and Filip Polášek in the final.

Salisbury won the mixed-doubles title at the French Open with Desirae Krawczyk. He also reached the mixed doubles final of the 2021 Wimbledon Championships partnering Harriet Dart.

Salisbury won his first Masters 1000 in Canada at the National Bank Open with Ram, defeating world No. 1 and No. 2 Croatians, Pavic and Mektic, his second final for the year at a Masters level after the Italian Open, where they lost to the Croatian pair.

At the US Open Salisbury partnering with Ram reached the final, defeating Max Purcell/Matthew Ebden in match lasting more than three hours match with three tiebreaks, saving four match points in the quarterfinals and Sam Querrey/Steve Johnson in the semifinals. The pair won the men’s doubles championship, defeating Jamie Murray/Bruno Soares in the final. It was the first time in the Open Era that two Britons met in a major men's doubles final and the first time in 12 years that the US Open men’s doubles final went to a deciding set. Seeded second, he also won his second mixed-doubles Grand Slam title at the US Open, again with Krawczyk, defeating Marcelo Arévalo and Giuliana Olmos in straight sets. He became the first man since Bob Bryan in 2010 to win the US Open doubles and mixed titles in the same year.

At the San Diego Open, Salisbury won his eighth title and third of the season partnering Neal Skupski.

=== 2022: World No. 1, US Open champion, two Masters titles, Tour Finals win ===
At the Miami Open, Salisbury and Ram reached the quarterfinals, losing to eventual champions Hubert Hurkacz and John Isner. Following this result, Salisbury became the new world No. 1 in men's doubles on 4 April 2022. He became the second British man to be doubles number one, after Jamie Murray. He won the 2022 Monte-Carlo Masters with Ram defeating sixth seeded pair of Robert Farah and Juan Sebastian Cabal. The duo reached the semifinals at the 2022 Wimbledon Championships, losing to Matthew Ebden and Max Purcell in five sets.

Salisbury and Ram had a successful summer hardcourt season, winning the 2022 Western & Southern Open and clinching their third Grand Slam title together while defending their title at the 2022 US Open with a straight-sets win over second seeds Neal Skupski and Wesley Koolhof. They became just the second team to repeat as men's doubles champions at this Major in the Open Era other than Todd Woodbridge and Mark Woodforde who went also back-to-back in New York. Salisbury and Ram ended the year by winning the ATP Finals in Turin, Italy, beating Nikola Mektic and Mate Pavic 7-6, 6-4 in the final.

=== 2023: US Open history and Tour Finals double ===
Salisbury and Ram became the first team to win three successive US Open men's doubles titles in the Open Era when they fought back from a set down to defeat Rohan Bopanna and Matthew Ebden 2-6 6-3 6-4 in the final at Flushing Meadows in September.

Two months later, the pair successfully defended their ATP Finals doubles title by beating Marcel Granollers and Horacio Zeballos in straight sets in the final in Turin, Italy.

=== 2024: Adelaide title, Olympics, split with Ram ===
Salisbury and Ram began the 2024 season by winning the Adelaide International.

He represented Great Britain at the Paris Olympics but went out in the first round of the men's doubles with Neal Skupski and mixed doubles with Heather Watson.

Back alongside Ram, he reached the final of the Canadian Open in Montreal but lost to top seeds Marcel Granollers and Horacio Zeballos in straight sets.

At the US Open, Salisbury and Ram went out in the third round to Nathaniel Lammons and Jackson Withrow, suffering their first loss at the tournament in four years after a run of 20 successive wins. On 25 September, Salisbury and Ram announced they had ended their partnership. The following day, Salisbury revealed he would be playing alongside fellow Briton Neal Skupski during the 2025 season.

=== 2025-26: Two major doubles and Wimbledon mixed finals, retirement ===
In February 2025, Salisbury and Skupski reached the final at the Qatar Open, losing to fellow Britons Julian Cash and Lloyd Glasspool in straight sets. They were also runners-up at the Barcelona Open in April 2025, losing to Sander Arends and Luke Johnson in the final.

Salisbury and Skupski were runners-up at the 2025 French Open, losing in the final to Marcel Granollers and Horacio Zeballos in three sets.

In July 2025 at Wimbledon, he reached the mixed doubles final alongside Luisa Stefani, but lost to Sem Verbeek and Kateřina Siniaková. The following month, Salisbury and Skupski made it to the final at the Canadian Open, but lost to second seeds Julian Cash and Lloyd Glasspool.

They reached the final at the 2025 US Open, but, in a repeat of the French Open final earlier that year, lost to Marcel Granollers and Horacio Zeballos in three sets despite having three championship points during the match. Salisbury and Skupski went unbeaten to top their group at the season-ending ATP Finals in Turin and then defeated world No. 1 pairing Julian Cash and Lloyd Glasspool in the semifinals, before losing to Harri Heliövaara and Henry Patten in the final in straight sets. Two days after the final, Salisbury announced he was taking a break from tennis until at least April 2026 due to anxiety.

Reunited with Rajeev Ram, Salisbury reached the semifinals at the 2026 US Open, where they lost to sixth seeds Kevin Krawietz and Tim Pütz. On 16 September 2026, he announced his retirement from professional tennis in a social media post, revealing he had been thinking about the decision for "a while" and stating: "I gave it my all and know I can be proud and look back with no regrets."

== Doubles performance timeline ==
Key
W	F	SF	QF	#R	RR	Q#	DNQ	A	NH

(W) winner; (F) finalist; (SF) semifinalist; (QF) quarterfinalist; (#R) rounds 4, 3, 2, 1; (RR) round-robin stage; (Q#) qualification round; (DNQ) did not qualify; (A) absent; (NH) not held; (SR) strike rate (events won / competed); (W–L) win–loss record.
To avoid confusion and double counting, these charts are updated at the conclusion of a tournament or when the player's participation has ended.

=== Doubles ===
Tournament	2016	2017	2018	2019	2020	2021	2022	2023	2024	2025	2026	SR	W–L
Grand Slam tournaments
Australian Open	A	A	A	3R	W	F	SF	3R	3R	2R	A	1 / 7	22–6
French Open	A	A	A	QF	QF	2R	QF	3R	QF	F	1R	0 / 8	20–8
Wimbledon	Q2	1R	SF	3R	NH	SF	SF	1R	2R	QF	1R	0 / 9	18–9
US Open	A	A	1R	3R	SF	W	W	W	3R	F	SF	3 / 9	34–6
Win–loss	0–0	0–1	4–2	9–4	12–2	16–3	17–3	10–3	8–4	14–4	4–3	4 / 33	94–29
Year-end championship
ATP Finals	Did not qualify			RR	SF	F	W	W	DNQ	F	DNQ	2 / 6	21–6
National representation
Summer Olympics	A	Not held				QF	Not held		1R	NH		0 / 2	2–2
Davis Cup	A	A	A	A	QF		RR	A	A	Q1	A	0 / 3	3–4
ATP Cup / United Cup	Not held				QF	DNQ	RR	A	A	A	A	0 / 2	2–3
ATP World Tour Masters 1000
Indian Wells Masters	A	A	A	1R	NH	2R	SF	1R	2R	2R	A	0 / 6	6–6
Miami Open	A	A	A	2R	NH	SF	QF	2R	QF	1R	A	0 / 6	9–6
Monte-Carlo Masters	A	A	A	1R	NH	2R	W	2R	2R	2R	1R	1 / 7	6–6
Madrid Open	A	A	A	1R	NH	1R	2R	1R	2R	2R	2R	0 / 7	3–7
Italian Open	A	A	A	1R	1R	F	1R	QF	QF	SF	2R	0 / 8	12–8
Canadian Open	A	A	A	SF	NH	W	2R	F	F	F	1R	1 / 7	17–6
Cincinnati Masters	A	A	A	1R	SF	QF	W	2R	QF	SF	2R	1 / 8	12–7
Shanghai Masters	A	A	A	QF	Not held			QF	1R	A	A	0 / 3	3–3
Paris Masters	A	A	A	QF	A	2R	QF	SF	1R	2R	A	0 / 6	1–6
Win–loss	0–0	0–0	0–0	8–9	2–2	14–7	14–6	9–9	10–9	14–8	3–5	3 / 58	73–55
Career statistics
Tournaments	1	3	12	27	10	21	18	23	21	23	13	172	
Titles	0	0	2	2	1	3	4	4	1	0	0	17	
Finals	0	0	2	5	1	8	4	5	2	6	0	33	
Overall win–loss	0–1	0–3	19–10	41–26	22–11	51–20	38–17	37–19	23–20	46–22	9–13	286–163	
Win %	0%	0%	65%	61%	66%	71%	69%	66%	53%	68%	41%	65%	
Year-end ranking	318	107	30	22	12	3	4	7	33	10			

=== Mixed doubles ===
Tournament	2017	2018	2019	2020	2021	2022	2023	2024	2025	SR	W–L
Australian Open	A	A	A	1R	SF	1R	A	QF	1R	0 / 5	5–5
French Open	A	A	A	NH	W	A	1R	2R	1R	1 / 4	4–3
Wimbledon	1R	1R	1R	NH	F	A	2R	2R	F	0 / 7	11–7
US Open	A	A	2R	NH	W	A	1R	1R	A	1 / 4	6–3
Win–loss	0–1	0–1	1–2	0–1	16–2	0–1	1–3	4–4	4–3	2 / 20	26–18

== Grand Slam finals ==
=== Doubles: 7 (4 titles, 3 runners-up) ===
Result	Year	Tournament	Surface	Partner	Opponents	Score
Win	2020	Australian Open	Hard	(United States) Rajeev Ram	(Australia) Max Purcell (Australia) Luke Saville	6–4, 6–2
Loss	2021	Australian Open	Hard	(United States) Rajeev Ram	(Croatia) Ivan Dodig (Slovakia) Filip Polášek	3–6, 4–6
Win	2021	US Open	Hard	(United States) Rajeev Ram	(United Kingdom) Jamie Murray (Brazil) Bruno Soares	3–6, 6–2, 6–2
Win	2022	US Open (2)	Hard	(United States) Rajeev Ram	(Netherlands) Wesley Koolhof (United Kingdom) Neal Skupski	7–6^{(7–4)}, 7–5
Win	2023	US Open (3)	Hard	(United States) Rajeev Ram	(India) Rohan Bopanna (Australia) Matthew Ebden	2–6, 6–3, 6–4
Loss	2025	French Open	Clay	(United Kingdom) Neal Skupski	(Spain) Marcel Granollers (Argentina) Horacio Zeballos	0–6, 7–6^{(7–5)}, 5–7
Loss	2025	US Open	Hard	(United Kingdom) Neal Skupski	(Spain) Marcel Granollers (Argentina) Horacio Zeballos	6–3, 6–7^{(5–7)}, 5–7

=== Mixed doubles: 4 (2 titles, 2 runners-up) ===
Result	Year	Tournament	Surface	Partner	Opponents	Score
Win	2021	French Open	Clay	(United States) Desirae Krawczyk	(Russia) Elena Vesnina (Russia) Aslan Karatsev	2–6, 6–4, [10–5]
Loss	2021	Wimbledon	Grass	(United Kingdom) Harriet Dart	(United States) Desirae Krawczyk (United Kingdom) Neal Skupski	2–6, 6–7^{(1–7)}
Win	2021	US Open	Hard	(United States) Desirae Krawczyk	(Mexico) Giuliana Olmos (El Salvador) Marcelo Arévalo	7–5, 6–2
Loss	2025	Wimbledon	Grass	(Brazil) Luisa Stefani	(Czech Republic) Kateřina Siniaková (Netherlands) Sem Verbeek	6–7^{(3–7)}, 6–7^{(3–7)}

== Other significant finals ==
=== Year-end championships ===
==== Doubles: 4 (2 titles, 2 runners-up) ====
Result	Year	Tournament	Surface	Partner	Opponents	Score
Loss	2021	ATP Finals, Italy	Hard (i)	(United States) Rajeev Ram	(France) Pierre-Hugues Herbert (France) Nicolas Mahut	4–6, 6–7^{(0–7)}
Win	2022	ATP Finals, Italy	Hard (i)	(United States) Rajeev Ram	(Croatia) Nikola Mektić (Croatia) Mate Pavić	7–6^{(7–4)}, 6–4
Win	2023	ATP Finals, Italy (2)	Hard (i)	(United States) Rajeev Ram	(Spain) Marcel Granollers (Argentina) Horacio Zeballos	6–3, 6–4
Loss	2025	ATP Finals, Italy	Hard (i)	(United Kingdom) Neal Skupski	(Finland) Harri Heliövaara (United Kingdom) Henry Patten	5–7, 3–6

=== ATP Masters 1000 ===
==== Doubles: 7 (3 titles, 4 runners-up) ====
Result	Year	Tournament	Surface	Partner	Opponents	Score
Loss	2021	Italian Open	Clay	(United States) Rajeev Ram	(Croatia) Nikola Mektić (Croatia) Mate Pavić	4–6, 6–7^{(4–7)}
Win	2021	Canadian Open	Hard	(United States) Rajeev Ram	(Croatia) Nikola Mektić (Croatia) Mate Pavić	6–3, 4–6, [10–3]
Win	2022	Monte-Carlo Masters	Clay	(United States) Rajeev Ram	(Colombia) Juan Sebastián Cabal (Colombia) Robert Farah	6–4, 3–6, [10–7]
Win	2022	Cincinnati Masters	Hard	(United States) Rajeev Ram	(Germany) Tim Pütz (New Zealand) Michael Venus	7–6^{(7–4)}, 7–6^{(7–5)}
Loss	2023	Canadian Open	Hard	(United States) Rajeev Ram	(El Salvador) Marcelo Arévalo (Netherlands) Jean-Julien Rojer	3–6, 1–6
Loss	2024	Canadian Open	Hard	(United States) Rajeev Ram	(Spain) Marcel Granollers (Argentina) Horacio Zeballos	2–6, 6–7^{(4–7)}
Loss	2025	Canadian Open	Hard	(United Kingdom) Neal Skupski	(United Kingdom) Julian Cash (United Kingdom) Lloyd Glasspool	3–6, 7–6^{(7–5)}, [11–13]

== ATP Tour finals ==
=== Doubles: 33 (17 titles, 16 runners-up) ===
Legend Grand Slam (4–3) ATP Finals (2–2) ATP 1000 (3–4) ATP 500 (4–4) ATP 250 (4–3)	Finals by surface Hard (15–11) Clay (2–3) Grass (0–2)	Finals by setting Outdoor (12–12) Indoor (5–4)

Result	W–L	Date	Tournament	Tier	Surface	Partner	Opponents	Score
Win	1–0	Sep 2018	Shenzhen Open, China	250 Series	Hard	(Japan) Ben McLachlan	(Sweden) Robert Lindstedt (United States) Rajeev Ram	7–6^{(7–5)}, 7–6^{(7–4)}
Win	2–0	Oct 2018	Vienna Open, Austria	500 Series	Hard (i)	(United Kingdom) Neal Skupski	(United States) Mike Bryan (France) Édouard Roger-Vasselin	7–6^{(7–5)}, 6–3
Loss	2–1	Jan 2019	Brisbane International, Australia	250 Series	Hard	(United States) Rajeev Ram	(New Zealand) Marcus Daniell (Netherlands) Wesley Koolhof	4–6, 6–7^{(6–8)}
Win	3–1	Mar 2019	Dubai Tennis Championships, United Arab Emirates	500 Series	Hard	(United States) Rajeev Ram	(Japan) Ben McLachlan (Germany) Jan-Lennard Struff	7–6^{(7–4)}, 6–3
Loss	3–2	Jun 2019	Queen's Club Championships, United Kingdom	500 Series	Grass	(United States) Rajeev Ram	(Spain) Feliciano López (United Kingdom) Andy Murray	6–7^{(6–8)}, 7–5, [5–10]
Loss	3–3	Oct 2019	European Open, Belgium	250 Series	Hard (i)	(United States) Rajeev Ram	(Germany) Kevin Krawietz (Germany) Andreas Mies	6–7^{(1–7)}, 3–6
Win	4–3	Oct 2019	Vienna Open, Austria (2)	500 Series	Hard (i)	(United States) Rajeev Ram	(Poland) Łukasz Kubot (Brazil) Marcelo Melo	6–4, 6–7^{(5–7)}, [10–5]
Win	5–3	Feb 2020	Australian Open, Australia	Grand Slam	Hard	(United States) Rajeev Ram	(Australia) Max Purcell (Australia) Luke Saville	6–4, 6–2
Loss	5–4	Feb 2021	Australian Open, Australia	Grand Slam	Hard	(United States) Rajeev Ram	(Croatia) Ivan Dodig (Slovakia) Filip Polášek	3–6, 4–6
Loss	5–5	May 2021	Italian Open, Italy	Masters 1000	Clay	(United States) Rajeev Ram	(Croatia) Nikola Mektić (Croatia) Mate Pavić	4–6, 6–7^{(4–7)}
Loss	5–6	Jun 2021	Eastbourne International, United Kingdom	250 Series	Grass	(United States) Rajeev Ram	(Croatia) Nikola Mektić (Croatia) Mate Pavić	4–6, 3–6
Win	6–6	Aug 2021	Canadian Open, Canada	Masters 1000	Hard	(United States) Rajeev Ram	(Croatia) Nikola Mektić (Croatia) Mate Pavić	6–3, 4–6, [10–3]
Win	7–6	Sep 2021	US Open, United States	Grand Slam	Hard	(United States) Rajeev Ram	(United Kingdom) Jamie Murray (Brazil) Bruno Soares	3–6, 6–2, 6–2
Win	8–6	Oct 2021	San Diego Open, United States	250 Series	Hard	(United Kingdom) Neal Skupski	(Australia) John Peers (Slovakia) Filip Polášek	7–6^{(7–2)}, 3–6, [10–5]
Loss	8–7	Oct 2021	Vienna Open, Austria	500 Series	Hard (i)	(United States) Rajeev Ram	(Colombia) Juan Sebastián Cabal (Colombia) Robert Farah	4–6, 2–6
Loss	8–8	Nov 2021	ATP Finals, Italy	Tour Finals	Hard (i)	(United States) Rajeev Ram	(France) Pierre-Hugues Herbert (France) Nicolas Mahut	4–6, 6–7^{(0–7)}
Win	9–8	Apr 2022	Monte-Carlo Masters, Monaco	Masters 1000	Clay	(United States) Rajeev Ram	(Colombia) Juan Sebastián Cabal (Colombia) Robert Farah	6–4, 3–6, [10–7]
Win	10–8	Aug 2022	Cincinnati Masters, United States	Masters 1000	Hard	(United States) Rajeev Ram	(Germany) Tim Pütz (New Zealand) Michael Venus	7–6^{(7–4)}, 7–6^{(7–5)}
Win	11–8	Sep 2022	US Open, United States (2)	Grand Slam	Hard	(United States) Rajeev Ram	(Netherlands) Wesley Koolhof (United Kingdom) Neal Skupski	7–6^{(7–4)}, 7–5
Win	12–8	Nov 2022	ATP Finals, Italy	Tour Finals	Hard (i)	(United States) Rajeev Ram	(Croatia) Nikola Mektić (Croatia) Mate Pavić	7–6^{(7–4)}, 6–4
Win	13–8	May 2023	Lyon Open, France	250 Series	Clay	(United States) Rajeev Ram	(France) Nicolas Mahut (Netherlands) Matwé Middelkoop	6–0, 6–3
Loss	13–9	Aug 2023	Canadian Open, Canada	Masters 1000	Hard	(United States) Rajeev Ram	(El Salvador) Marcelo Arévalo (Netherlands) Jean-Julien Rojer	3–6, 1–6
Win	14–9	Sep 2023	US Open, United States (3)	Grand Slam	Hard	(United States) Rajeev Ram	(India) Rohan Bopanna (Australia) Matthew Ebden	2–6, 6–3, 6–4
Win	15–9	Oct 2023	Vienna Open, Austria (3)	500 Series	Hard (i)	(United States) Rajeev Ram	(United States) Nathaniel Lammons (United States) Jackson Withrow	6–4, 5–7, [12–10]
Win	16–9	Nov 2023	ATP Finals, Italy (2)	Tour Finals	Hard (i)	(United States) Rajeev Ram	(Spain) Marcel Granollers (Argentina) Horacio Zeballos	6–3, 6–4
Win	17–9	Jan 2024	Adelaide International, Australia	250 Series	Hard	(United States) Rajeev Ram	(India) Rohan Bopanna (Australia) Matthew Ebden	7–5, 5–7, [11–9]
Loss	17–10	Aug 2024	Canadian Open, Canada	Masters 1000	Hard	(United States) Rajeev Ram	(Spain) Marcel Granollers (Argentina) Horacio Zeballos	2–6, 6–7^{(4–7)}
Loss	17–11	Feb 2025	Qatar Open, Qatar	500 Series	Hard	(United Kingdom) Neal Skupski	(United Kingdom) Julian Cash (United Kingdom) Lloyd Glasspool	3–6, 2–6
Loss	17–12	Apr 2025	Barcelona Open, Spain	500 Series	Clay	(United Kingdom) Neal Skupski	(Netherlands) Sander Arends (United Kingdom) Luke Johnson	3–6, 7–6^{(7–1)}, [6–10]
Loss	17–13	Jun 2025	French Open, France	Grand Slam	Clay	(United Kingdom) Neal Skupski	(Spain) Marcel Granollers (Argentina) Horacio Zeballos	0–6, 7–6^{(7–5)}, 5–7
Loss	17–14	Aug 2025	Canadian Open, Canada	Masters 1000	Hard	(United Kingdom) Neal Skupski	(United Kingdom) Julian Cash (United Kingdom) Lloyd Glasspool	3–6, 7–6^{(7–5)}, [11–13]
Loss	17–15	Sep 2025	US Open, United States	Grand Slam	Hard	(United Kingdom) Neal Skupski	(Spain) Marcel Granollers (Argentina) Horacio Zeballos	6–3, 6–7^{(5–7)}, 5–7
Loss	17–16	Nov 2025	ATP Finals, Italy	Tour Finals	Hard (i)	(United Kingdom) Neal Skupski	(Finland) Harri Heliövaara (United Kingdom) Henry Patten	5–7, 3–6

== ATP Challenger and ITF Tour finals ==
=== Singles: 1 (title) ===
Legend ATP Challenger Tour (–) ITF Futures (1–0)

Result	W–L	Date	Tournament	Tier	Surface	Opponent	Score
Win	1–0	Oct 2015	Sweden F5, Danderyd	Futures	Hard (i)	(Sweden) Mikael Ymer	7–6^{(7–3)}, 3–6, 6–3

=== Doubles: 35 (18 titles, 17 runner-ups) ===
Legend ATP Challenger Tour (9–9) ITF Futures (9–8)	Finals by surface Hard (17–14) Clay (0–1) Grass (1–2)

Result	W–L	Date	Tournament	Tier	Surface	Partner	Opponents	Score
Loss	0–1	Jul 2013	Great Britain F13, Ilkley	Futures	Grass	(United Kingdom) George Coupland	(New Zealand) Marcus Daniell (United Kingdom) Richard Gabb	3–6, 6–4, [8–10]
Loss	0–2	Sep 2014	Great Britain F15, London	Futures	Hard	(Republic of Ireland) David O'Hare	(Denmark) Frederik Nielsen (United Kingdom) Joshua Ward-Hibbert	7–6^{(7–5)}, 4–6, [8–10]
Win	1–2	Oct 2014	Sweden F6, Jönköping	Futures	Hard (i)	(Republic of Ireland) David O'Hare	(Sweden) Isak Arvidsson (Sweden) Markus Eriksson	7–6^{(8–6)}, 7–6^{(7–3)}
Loss	1–3	Oct 2014	France F23, Cap d'Agde	Futures	Hard (i)	(Republic of Ireland) David O'Hare	(Netherlands) Sander Groen (France) Alexandre Sidorenko	4–6, 7–5, [8–10]
Loss	1–4	Nov 2014	Great Britain F18, Loughborough	Futures	Hard (i)	(Republic of Ireland) David O'Hare	(United Kingdom) Scott Clayton (United Kingdom) Toby Martin	4–6, 4–6
Win	2–4	Nov 2014	Great Britain F19, Bath	Futures	Hard (i)	(Republic of Ireland) David O'Hare	(United Kingdom) Richard Gabb (United Kingdom) Jonny O'Mara	6–1, 6–2
Loss	2–5	Dec 2014	Togo F1, Lomé	Futures	Hard	(Republic of Ireland) David O'Hare	(Belgium) Maxime Authom (Colombia) Juan Sebastián Gómez	3–6, 3–6
Win	3–5	Dec 2014	Togo F1, Lomé	Futures	Hard	(Republic of Ireland) David O'Hare	(Togo) Komlavi Loglo (France) Josselin Ouanna	7–6^{(7–5)}, 6–4
Loss	3–6	Apr 2015	Greece F4, Heraklion	Futures	Hard	(United Kingdom) Joshua Ward-Hibbert	(Greece) Alexandros Jakupovic (Greece) Markos Kalovelonis	1–6, 2–6
Win	4–6	May 2015	Egypt F18, Sharm El Sheikh	Futures	Hard	(Australia) Ryan Agar	(Spain) Javier Pulgar-García (Spain) Pablo Vivero González	6–2, 6–1
Win	5–6	Sep 2015	Great Britain F8, Roehampton	Futures	Hard	(Republic of Ireland) David O'Hare	(United Kingdom) Neil Pauffley (United Kingdom) David Rice	6–2, 4–6, [10–5]
Win	6–6	Sep 2015	Sweden F4, Falun	Futures	Hard (i)	(Republic of Ireland) David O'Hare	(United Kingdom) James Marsalek (United Kingdom) Marcus Willis	6–3, 7–5
Win	7–6	Oct 2015	Sweden F5, Danderyd	Futures	Hard (i)	(Republic of Ireland) David O'Hare	(Republic of Ireland) Sam Barry (United Kingdom) David Rice	7–5, 6–7^{(5–7)}, [10–5]
Win	8–6	Nov 2015	Champaign, United States	Challenger	Hard (i)	(Republic of Ireland) David O'Hare	(United States) Austin Krajicek (United States) Nicholas Monroe	6–1, 6–4
Win	9–6	Jan 2016	USA F2, Long Beach	Futures	Hard	(Republic of Ireland) David O'Hare	(United States) Evan King (United States) Raymond Sarmiento	6–3, 7–6^{(7–4)}
Loss	9–7	Sep 2016	Saint-Rémy-de-Provence, France	Challenger	Hard	(Republic of Ireland) David O'Hare	(United Kingdom) Ken Skupski (United Kingdom) Neal Skupski	7–6^{(7–5)}, 4–6, [5–10]
Win	10–7	Nov 2016	Columbus, United States	Challenger	Hard (i)	(Republic of Ireland) David O'Hare	(United Kingdom) Luke Bambridge (United Kingdom) Cameron Norrie	6–3, 6–4
Loss	10–8	Jan 2016	USA F1, Los Angeles	Futures	Hard	(United Kingdom) Luke Bambridge	(Germany) Yannick Hanfmann (Ecuador) Roberto Quiroz	6–3, 4–6, [8–10]
Loss	10–9	Jan 2016	USA F1, Long Beach	Futures	Hard	(United Kingdom) Luke Bambridge	(United States) Austin Krajicek (United States) Jackson Withrow	3–6, 6–3, [8–10]
Win	11–9	Feb 2017	Dallas, United States	Challenger	Hard (i)	(Republic of Ireland) David O'Hare	(India) Jeevan Nedunchezhiyan (Indonesia) Christopher Rungkat	6–7^{(6–8)}, 6–3, [11–9]
Loss	11–10	Apr 2017	Saint-Brieuc, France	Challenger	Hard (i)	(Republic of Ireland) David O'Hare	(Germany) Andre Begemann (Denmark) Frederik Nielsen	3–6, 4–6
Loss	11–11	Jun 2017	Ilkley, United Kingdom	Challenger	Grass	(United Kingdom) Brydan Klein	(India) Leander Paes (Canada) Adil Shamasdin	2–6, 6–2, [8–10]
Win	12–11	Jul 2017	Granby, Canada	Challenger	Hard	(United States) Jackson Withrow	(Uruguay) Marcel Felder (Japan) Go Soeda	4–6, 6–3, [10–6]
Win	13–11	Oct 2017	Stockton, United States	Challenger	Hard	(United Kingdom) Brydan Klein	(United States) Denis Kudla (Latvia) Miķelis Lībietis	6–2, 6–4
Win	14–11	Oct 2017	Las Vegas, United States	Challenger	Hard	(United Kingdom) Brydan Klein	(Mexico) Hans Hach Verdugo (United States) Dennis Novikov	6–3, 4–6, [10–3]
Loss	14–12	Nov 2017	Champaign, United States	Challenger	Hard (i)	(South Africa) Ruan Roelofse	(India) Leander Paes (India) Purav Raja	3–6, 7–6^{(7–5)}, [5–10]
Win	15–12	Jan 2018	Bangkok, Thailand	Challenger	Hard	(United States) James Cerretani	(Spain) Enrique López-Pérez (Spain) Pedro Martínez	6–7^{(5–7)}, 6–3, [10–8]
Loss	15–13	Feb 2018	Dallas, United States	Challenger	Hard (i)	(India) Leander Paes	(India) Jeevan Nedunchezhiyan (Indonesia) Christopher Rungkat	4–6, 6–3, [7–10]
Loss	15–14	Feb 2018	San Francisco, United States	Challenger	Hard (i)	(United Kingdom) Luke Bambridge	(El Salvador) Marcelo Arévalo (Venezuela) Roberto Maytín	3–6, 7–6^{(5–7)}, [7–10]
Win	16–14	Mar 2018	Canada F2, Sherbrooke	Futures	Hard (i)	(United Kingdom) Luke Bambridge	(Switzerland) Adrien Bossel (Belgium) Joris De Loore	6–3, 7–5
Loss	16–15	Mar 2018	Saint-Brieuc, France	Challenger	Hard (i)	(United Kingdom) Luke Bambridge	(Netherlands) Sander Arends (Austria) Tristan-Samuel Weissborn	6–4, 1–6, [7–10]
Loss	16–16	Apr 2018	Tunis, Tunisia	Challenger	Clay	(France) Jonathan Eysseric	(Ukraine) Denys Molchanov (Slovakia) Igor Zelenay	6–7^{(4–7)}, 2–6
Win	17–16	May 2018	Loughborough, United Kingdom	Challenger	Hard (i)	(Denmark) Frederik Nielsen	(United Kingdom) Luke Bambridge (United Kingdom) Jonny O'Mara	3–6, 6–3, [10–4]
Win	18–16	Jun 2018	Nottingham, United Kingdom	Challenger	Grass	(Denmark) Frederik Nielsen	(United States) Austin Krajicek (India) Jeevan Nedunchezhiyan	7–6^{(7–5)}, 6–1
Loss	18–17	Aug 2018	Aptos, United States	Challenger	Hard	(United Kingdom) Jonny O'Mara	(Australia) Thanasi Kokkinakis (Australia) Matt Reid	2–6, 6–4, [8–10]
