= 2019 ATP Challenger China International – Nanchang =

- Date: 22–28 April
- Edition: 5th
- Draw: 48S / 16D
- Surface: Hard
- Location: Nanchang, China

Champions

Singles
- (Slovakia) Andrej Martin

Doubles
- (Netherlands) Sander Arends / (Austria) Tristan-Samuel Weissborn
← 2018 ·	ATP Challenger China International – Nanchang	· 2020 →

The 2019 ATP Challenger China International – Nanchang was a professional tennis tournament played on hard courts. It was the fifth edition of the tournament which was part of the 2019 ATP Challenger Tour. It took place in Nanchang, China between 22 and 28 April 2019.

== Singles main-draw entrants ==
=== Seeds ===
Country	Player	Rank^{1}	Seed
AUS	Jordan Thompson	67	1
~~IND~~	~~Prajnesh Gunneswaran~~	~~80~~	~~2~~
AUS	Alex Bolt	143	3
IND	Ramkumar Ramanathan	157	4
AUS	James Duckworth	158	5
AUS	Jason Kubler	161	6
SRB	Nikola Milojević	164	7
ESP	Enrique López Pérez	182	8
KAZ	Aleksandr Nedovyesov	190	9
FRA	Maxime Janvier	200	10
JPN	Go Soeda	207	11
GBR	Jay Clarke	211	12
CZE	Adam Pavlásek	213	13
KOR	Lee Duck-hee	236	14
BLR	Uladzimir Ignatik	239	15
JPN	Kaichi Uchida	243	16

- ^{1} Rankings are as of 15 April 2019.

=== Other entrants ===
The following players received wildcards into the singles main draw:

- (China) Cui Jie
- (China) Gao Xin
- (China) He Yecong
- (China) Sun Fajing
- (China) Te Rigele

The following players received entry into the singles main draw as alternates:

- (Israel) Ben Patael
- (India) Vishnu Vardhan

The following players received entry into the singles main draw using their ITF World Tennis Ranking:

- (China) Bai Yan
- (Russia) Teymuraz Gabashvili
- (Australia) Jacob Grills
- (Japan) Rio Noguchi

The following players received entry from the qualifying draw:

- (Switzerland) Luca Margaroli
- (China) Wu Hao

== Champions ==
=== Singles ===
- (Slovakia) Andrej Martin def. (Australia) Jordan Thompson 6–4, 1–6, 6–3.

=== Doubles ===
- (Netherlands) Sander Arends / (Austria) Tristan-Samuel Weissborn def. (Australia) Alex Bolt / (Australia) Akira Santillan 6–2, 6–4.
