= Loughborough Trophy =

Defunct tennis tournament
- Event name: Loughborough Trophy
- Location: Loughborough, United Kingdom
- Venue: Loughborough Sport Tennis Centre at Loughborough University
- Category: ATP Challenger Tour
- Surface: Hard (indoor)
- Draw: 32S/32Q/16D
- Prize money: €85,000
- Website: Official website

The Loughborough Trophy was a professional tennis tournament played on indoor hard courts. It was part of the ATP Challenger Tour. It was held in Loughborough, United Kingdom in 2018.

== Past finals ==
=== Singles ===
Year	Champion	Runner-up	Score
2018	(Japan) Hiroki Moriya	(United Kingdom) James Ward	6–2, 7–5

=== Doubles ===
Year	Champions	Runners-up	Score
2018	(Denmark) Frederik Nielsen (United Kingdom) Joe Salisbury	(United Kingdom) Luke Bambridge (United Kingdom) Jonny O'Mara	3–6, 6–3, [10–4]
