= 2016 ATP Challenger China International – Nanchang =

- Date: 12–17 September
- Edition: 3rd
- Draw: 32S / 16D
- Prize money: $50,000+H
- Surface: Hard
- Location: Nanchang, China

Champions

Singles
- (Japan) Hiroki Moriya

Doubles
- (China) Wu Di / (China) Zhang Zhizhen
← 2015 ·	ATP Challenger China International – Nanchang	· 2018 →

The 2016 ATP Challenger China International – Nanchang was a professional tennis tournament played on hard courts. It was the third edition of the tournament which was part of the 2016 ATP Challenger Tour. It took place in Nanchang, China between 12 and 17 September 2016.

== Singles main-draw entrants ==
=== Seeds ===
Country	Player	Rank^{1}	Seed
TPE	Lu Yen-hsun	73	1
AUS	Jordan Thompson	91	2
JPN	Tatsuma Ito	129	3
KOR	Chung Hyeon	131	4
ITA	Luca Vanni	164	5
TPE	Jason Jung	169	6
RUS	Alexander Kudryavtsev	170	7
CHN	Zhang Ze	174	8

- ^{1} Rankings are as of August 29, 2016.

=== Other entrants ===
The following players received wildcards into the singles main draw:

- (China) Sun Fajing
- (China) He Yecong
- (China) Zhang Zhizhen
- (China) Te Rigele

The following player received entry into the singles main draw with a protected ranking:

- (Croatia) Matija Pecotić

The following players received entry from the qualifying draw:

- (Ukraine) Denys Molchanov
- (Belarus) Sergey Betov
- (Japan) Shuichi Sekiguchi
- (China) Xia Zihao

== Champions ==
=== Singles ===
- (Japan) Hiroki Moriya def. (South Korea) Chung Hyeon, 4–6, 6–1, 6–4.

=== Doubles ===
- (China) Wu Di / (China) Zhang Zhizhen def. (Colombia) Nicolás Barrientos / (Philippines) Ruben Gonzales, 7–6^{(7–4)}, 6–3.
