= Liu Siyu =

Chinese tennis player

- Native name: 刘思宇
- Country (sports): China
- Born: 1 November 1995 (age 29)
- Height: 1.91 m (6 ft 3 in)
- Prize money: $18,440

Singles
- Career record: 0–0 (at ATP Tour level, Grand Slam level, and in Davis Cup)
- Career titles: 0
- Highest ranking: No. 906 (11 October 2014)

Doubles
- Career record: 0–1 (at ATP Tour level, Grand Slam level, and in Davis Cup)
- Career titles: 0
- Highest ranking: No. 1076 (9 August 2014)
- Last updated on: 1 May 2017.

Liu Siyu (born 1 November 1995) is a Chinese tennis player.

Liu has a career high ATP singles ranking of 906 achieved on 11 October 2014. He also has a career high ATP doubles ranking of 1076 achieved on 9 August 2014.

Liu made his ATP main draw debut at the 2014 China Open in the doubles draw partnering Ning Yuqing.
