= 2015 ATP Challenger China International – Nanchang =

- Date: 14–20 September
- Edition: 2nd
- Draw: 32S / 16D
- Prize money: $50,000+H
- Surface: Hard
- Location: Nanchang, China

Champions

Singles
- (Germany) Peter Gojowczyk

Doubles
- (France) Jonathan Eysseric / (Estonia) Jürgen Zopp
← 2014 ·	ATP Challenger China International – Nanchang	· 2016 →

The 2015 ATP Challenger China International – Nanchang was a professional tennis tournament played on hard courts. It was the second edition of the tournament which was part of the 2015 ATP Challenger Tour. It took place in Nanchang, China between 14 and 20 September 2015.

== Singles main-draw entrants ==
=== Seeds ===
Country	Player	Rank^{1}	Seed
TPE	~~Lu Yen-hsun~~	~~97~~	1
JPN	Go Soeda	111	2
ITA	Luca Vanni	123	3
EST	Jürgen Zopp	151	4
GER	Peter Gojowczyk	153	5
JPN	Yūichi Sugita	157	6
ITA	Thomas Fabbiano	189	7
AUS	Jordan Thompson	195	8

- ^{1} Rankings are as of September 7, 2015.

=== Other entrants ===
The following players received wildcards into the singles main draw:

- (China) He Yecong
- (China) Yuqing Ning
- (China) Zhuoyang Qiu
- (China) Zhicheng Zhu

The following player received entry courtesy of a protected ranking:

- (Israel) Amir Weintraub

The following player received entry by a special exemption:

- (Russia) Daniil Medvedev

The following players received entry from the qualifying draw:

- (India) Sriram Balaji
- (Italy) Riccardo Ghedin
- (India) Jeevan Nedunchezhiyan
- (New Zealand) Finn Tearney

The following player received entry as a lucky loser:

- (Australia) Dane Propoggia

== Doubles main-draw entrants ==
=== Seeds ===
Country	Player	Country	Player	Rank^{1}	Seed
ITA	Riccardo Ghedin	JPN	Toshihide Matsui	363	1
TPE	Hsieh Cheng-peng	AUS	Andrew Whittington	391	2
TPE	Chen Ti	TPE	Huang Liang-chi	459	3
COL	~~Nicolás Barrientos~~	ARG	~~Marco Trungelliti~~	~~492~~	4

- ^{1} Rankings as of September 7, 2015.

=== Other entrants ===
The following pairs received wildcards into the doubles main draw:

- (China) He Feng / (China) Yuqing Ning
- (China) He Yecong / (China) Zhuoyang Qiu
- (Russia) Daniil Medvedev / (China) Zhang Zhizhen

== Champions ==
=== Singles ===
- (Germany) Peter Gojowczyk def. (Israel) Amir Weintraub, 6–2, 6–1

=== Doubles ===
- (France) Jonathan Eysseric / (Estonia) Jürgen Zopp def. (Chinese Taipei) Lee Hsin-han / (Israel) Amir Weintraub, 6–4, 6–2
