= Ruben Gonzales (tennis) =

Filipino tennis player

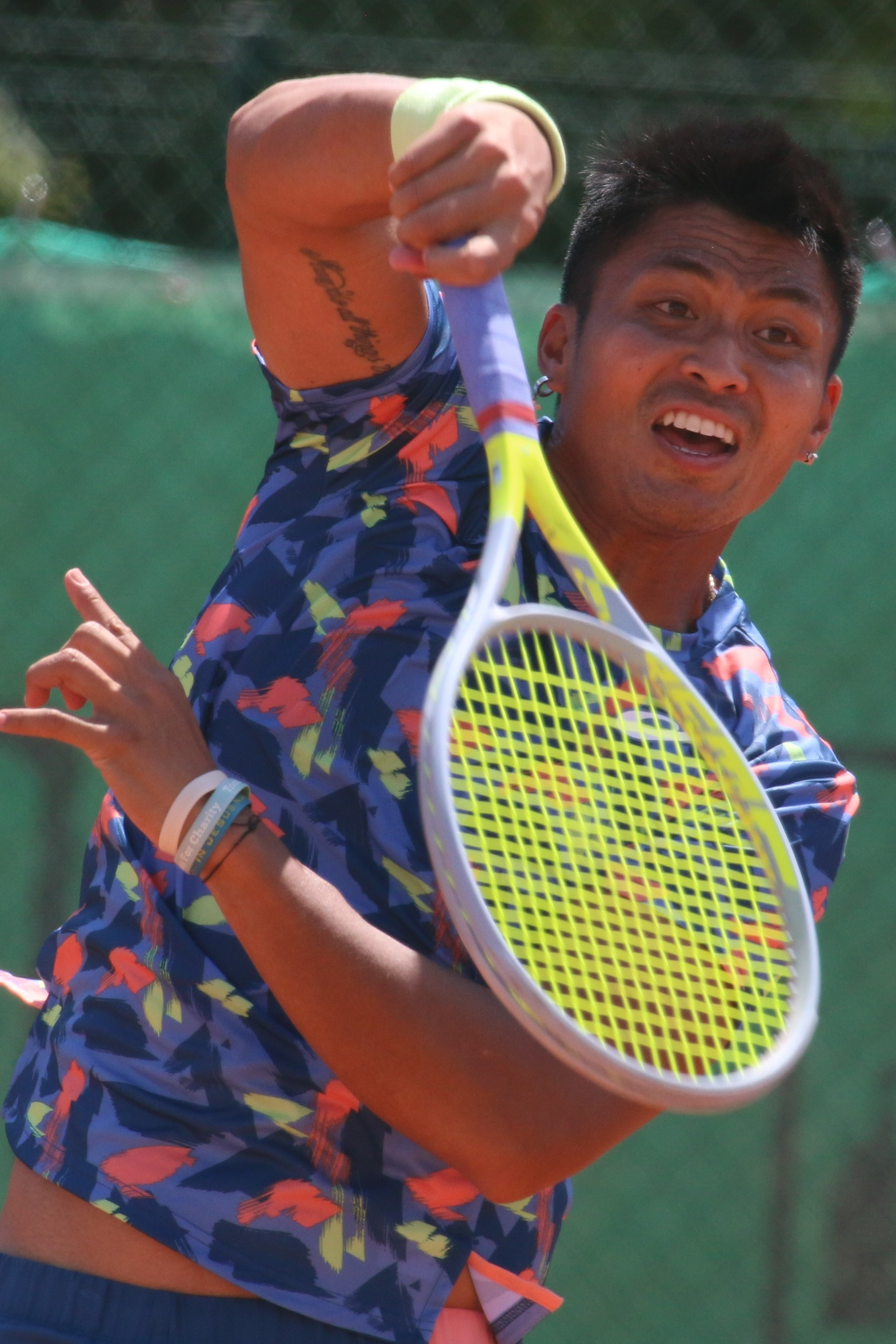
- Gonzales at the 2022 Internationaux de Tennis de Blois
- Country (sports): Philippines
- Born: September 11, 1985 (age 40) Terre Haute, Indiana, U.S.
- Plays: Right-handed
- College: Illinois (2004–2008)
- Prize money: $160,985

Singles
- Career record: 10–5
- Career titles: 0
- Highest ranking: No. 766 (6 May 2013)

Doubles
- Career record: 7–3
- Career titles: 0
- Highest ranking: No. 116 (6 March 2023)
Medal record
Men's Tennis
Representing Philippines
Southeast Asian Games
Gold medal – first place	2021 Vietnam	Doubles
Gold medal – first place	2023 Cambodia	Doubles
Silver medal – second place	2017 Kuala Lumpur	Doubles
Silver medal – second place	2019 Philippines	Doubles
Bronze medal – third place	2015 Singapore	Doubles
Bronze medal – third place	2015 Singapore	Team
Bronze medal – third place	2017 Kuala Lumpur	Mixed doubles
Bronze medal – third place	2021 Vietnam	Team

Ruben Gonzales (born September 11, 1985) is an American-born Filipino professional tennis player playing on the ATP Challenger Tour. On 6 May 2013, he reached his highest ATP singles ranking of No. 766 and his highest doubles ranking of No. 116 achieved on 6 March 2023.

== Personal life ==
Gonzales was born in Chicago and raised in Terre Haute, Indiana. His parents are from the Philippines and he has two siblings who he watched play tennis. At eight years old, he wanted to become a professional tennis player. For a time, he lived in Manila, where he spent some of his high school years.

In 2019, he proposed to his girlfriend, race car driver Michele Bumgarner.

== Career ==
=== College ===
In his rookie season, he won the 2005 Big Ten singles consolation championship. He was also named as an ITA Scholar-Athlete. In his sophomore was selected to the Academic All-Big Ten team while having the highest GPA on the team.

A lung injury, spontaneous pneumothorax, kept Gonzales out for most of his junior season and unable to qualify for the NCAA tournament in either singles or doubles. Despite this, he was able to finish with a No. 37 ranking in doubles and a No. 125 ranking in singles as he became known as "The Spirit of Illinois Tennis". He was awarded with Illinois' Scholar Athlete Award and was named to the Academic All-Big Ten team once again.

In his senior season, Gonzales helped Illinois defeat Xavier in the first round of the 2008 NCAA Division I tennis championships. Illinois made it to the Round of 16, where they lost to Ohio State.

=== Professional ===
In the 2016 ATP Challenger Philippine Open, Gonzales lost to Igor Sijsling.

In 2022, Gonzales won three ATP Challenger doubles championships. He followed that up with a runner-up finish in the 2023 Cleveland Open and a semis finish in the Tenerife Challenger.

== Tour titles ==
Legend
Grand Slam (0)
ATP Masters Series (0)
ATP Tour (0)
Challengers (7)

=== Doubles ===
Outcome	No.	Date	Tournament	Surface	Partner	Opponents	Score
Runner-up	1.	June 16, 2013	Internationaux de Tennis de Blois	Clay	(Australia) Chris Letcher	(France) Jonathan Eysseric (France) Nicolas Renavand	3–6, 4–6
Runner-up	2.	July 28, 2013	Tampere Open	Hard	(Australia) Chris Letcher	(Finland) Henri Kontinen (Serbia) Goran Tošić	4–6, 4–6
Winner	1.	July 27, 2014	Tampere Open	Clay	(United Kingdom) Sean Thornley	(Sweden) Elias Ymer (Russia) Anton Zaitcev	6–7^{(5–7)}, 7–6^{(12–10)}, [10–8]
Runner-up	3.	August 3, 2014	Svijany Open	Clay	(United Kingdom) Sean Thornley	(Czech Republic) Roman Jebavý (Czech Republic) Jaroslav Pospíšil	4–6, 3–6
Winner	2.	February 20, 2015	Morelos Open	Hard	(United Kingdom) Darren Walsh	(Ecuador) Emilio Gómez (Venezuela) Roberto Maytín	4–6, 6–3, [12–10]
Runner-up	4.	July 16, 2016	Gimcheon Open	Hard	(Colombia) Nicolás Barrientos	(Chinese Taipei) Cheng-Peng Hsieh (Chinese Taipei) Tsung-Hua Yang	(W/O)
Runner-up	5.	September 17, 2016	China International Nanchang	Hard	(Colombia) Nicolás Barrientos	(China) Wu Di (China) Zhang Zhizhen	6–7^{(4–7)}, 3–6
Runner-up	6.	November 19, 2017	Dunlop World Challenge Toyota	Carpet	(Indonesia) Christopher Rungkat	(Australia) Max Purcell (Australia) Andrew Whittington	3–6, 6–2, [8–10]
Runner-up	7.	April 22, 2018	China International Nanchang	Clay	(Indonesia) Christopher Rungkat	(China) Gong Mao-Xin (China) Zhang Ze	6–3, 6–7^{(7–9)}, [7–10]
Winner	3.	July 22, 2018	The Hague Open Scheveningen	Clay	(United States) Nathaniel Lammons	(Venezuela) Luis David Martinez (Portugal) Gonçalo Oliveira	6–3, 6–7^{(8–10)}, [10–5]
Runner-up	8.	August 5, 2018	Sopot Open	Clay	(United States) Nathaniel Lammons	(Poland) Mateusz Kowalczyk (Poland) Szymon Walków	6–7^{(6–8)}, 3–6
Winner	4.	October 20, 2019	Las Vegas Challenger	Hard	(South Africa) Ruan Roelofse	(United States) Nathan Pasha (United States) Max Schnur	2–6, 6–3, [10–8]
Runner-up	9.	November 3, 2019	City of Playford Tennis International II	Hard	(United States) Evan King	(Finland) Harri Heliövaara (Finland) Patrik Niklas-Salminen	4–6, 7–6^{(7–4)}, [7–10]
Winner	5.	September 25, 2021	Bucharest Challenger	Clay	(United States) Hunter Johnson	(Germany) Maximilian Marterer (Czech Republic) Lukáš Rosol	1–6, 6–2, [10–3]
Winner	6.	April 30, 2022	Savannah Challenger	Clay	(Philippines) Treat Huey	(Chinese Taipei) Wu Tung-lin (China) Zhang Zhizhen	7–6^{(7–3)}, 6–4
Runner-up	10.	July 16, 2022	Georgia's Rome Challenger	Hard (i)	(United States) Reese Stalder	(France) Enzo Couacaud (Australia) Andrew Harris	4–6, 2–6
Winner	7.	August 20, 2022	República Dominicana Open	Clay	(United States) Reese Stalder	(Colombia) Nicolás Barrientos (Mexico) Miguel Ángel Reyes-Varela	7–6^{(7–5)}, 6–3
Winner	8.	November 5, 2022	Keio Challenger Yokohama	Hard	(Romania) Victor Vlad Cornea	(Japan) Tomoya Fujiwara (Japan) Masamichi Imamura	7–5, 6–3
Runner-up	11.	February 4, 2023	Cleveland Open	Hard (i)	(United States) Reese Stalder	(United States) Robert Galloway (Mexico) Hans Hach Verdugo	6–3, 5–7, [6–10]
Runner-up	12.	February 18, 2023	Bahrain Ministry of Interior Tennis Challenger	Hard	(Brazil) Fernando Romboli	(Finland) Patrik Niklas-Salminen (Netherlands) Bart Stevens	3–6, 4–6
