= Ning Yuqing =

Chinese tennis player

- Native name: 宁宇清
- Country (sports): China
- Residence: Nanjing, China
- Born: 9 May 1994 (age 31) Nanjing, China
- Height: 1.78 m (5 ft 10 in)
- Plays: Right-handed (two-handed backhand)
- Prize money: $26,862

Singles
- Career record: 0–0 (at ATP Tour level, Grand Slam level, and in Davis Cup)
- Career titles: 0 ITF
- Highest ranking: No. 821 (17 August 2015)

Doubles
- Career record: 0–1 (at ATP Tour level, Grand Slam level, and in Davis Cup)
- Career titles: 2 ITF
- Highest ranking: No. 546 (27 June 2016)
- Last updated on: 27 February 2017.

Ning Yuqing (born 9 May 1994) is a Chinese former tennis player.

Ning has a career high ATP singles ranking of 821 achieved on 17 August 2015. He also has a career high ATP doubles ranking of 546 achieved on 27 June 2016.

Ning made his ATP main draw debut at the 2014 China Open in the doubles draw partnering Liu Siyu.
