= Hiroki Moriya =

Japanese tennis player (born 1990)

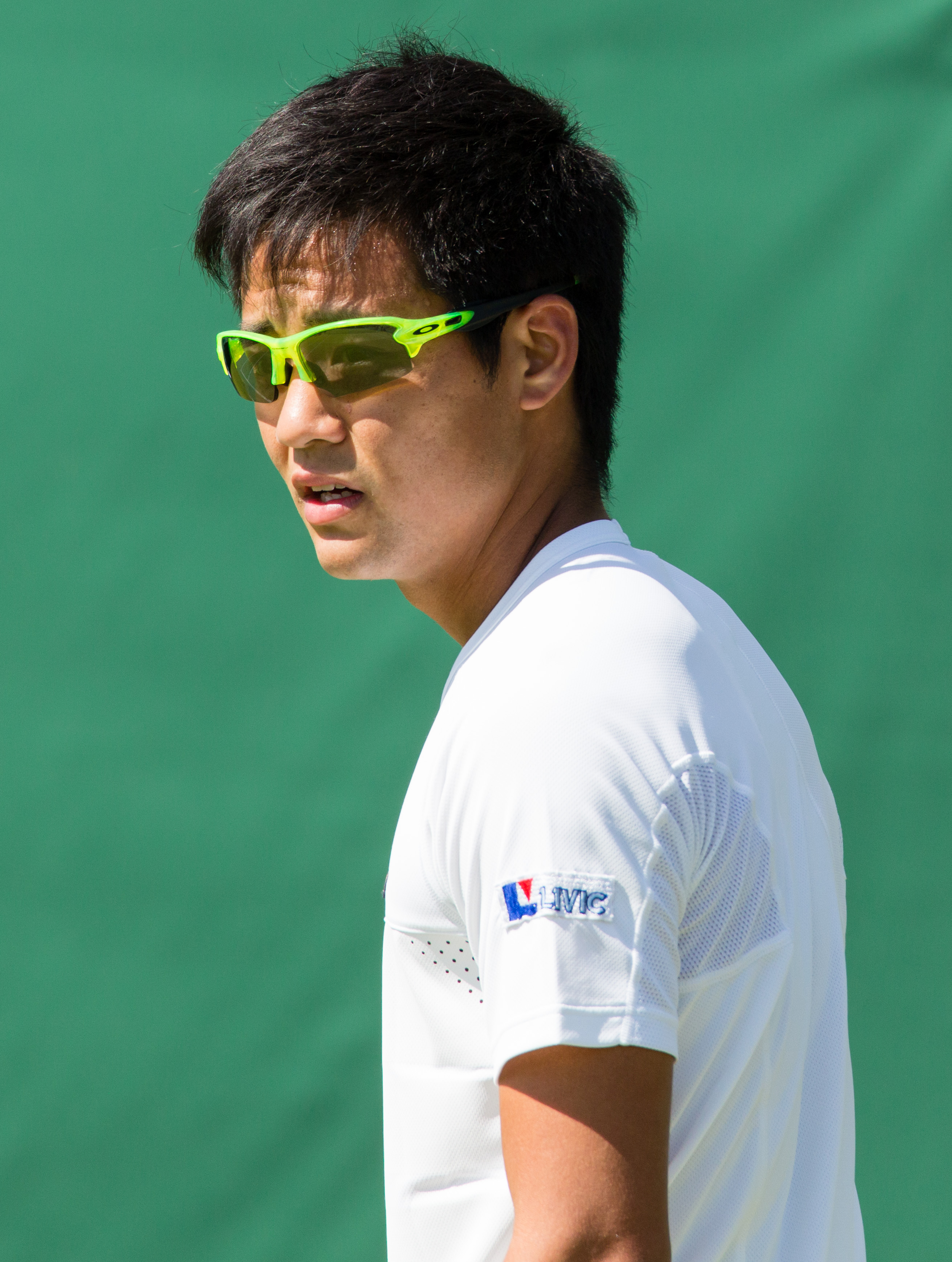
- Moriya at the 2015 Wimbledon qualifying tournament
- Country (sports): Japan
- Born: 16 October 1990 (age 35) Tokyo, Japan
- Height: 1.68 m (5 ft 6 in)
- Turned pro: December 2008
- Plays: Right-handed (two-handed backhand)
- Coach: Óscar Hernández, Bruno Alcala
- Prize money: US $1,103,901

Singles
- Career record: 3–11
- Career titles: 0
- Highest ranking: No. 143 (5 January 2015)
- Current ranking: No. 490 (22 June 2026)

Grand Slam singles results
- Australian Open: 1R (2015)
- French Open: Q2 (2012, 2020)
- Wimbledon: 1R (2015)
- US Open: 1R (2012)

Doubles
- Career record: 0–2
- Career titles: 0
- Highest ranking: No. 224 (15 July 2019)
- Last updated on: 22 June 2026.

Hiroki Moriya (Japanese: 守屋 宏紀, Hepburn: Moriya Hiroki; born 16 October 1990 in Tokyo) is a Japanese tennis player. He achieved a career-high singles ranking of world No. 143 on 5 January 2015 and a doubles ranking of No. 224 achieved on 15 July 2019. Moriya has won three ATP Challenger Tour singles titles.

== Tennis career ==
=== Juniors ===
As a junior, Moriya compiled a singles win–loss record of 76–37, reaching as high as No. 17 in the junior combined world rankings in October 2008.

Junior Grand Slam results:

Australian Open: 3R (2007, 2008)
French Open: Q1 (2007)
Wimbledon: 1R (2008)
US Open: Q2 (2006)

=== 2008–2011 ===
Moriya had won three ITF Futures events in Japan and Chinese Taipei. He also had participated in a number of ATP Challenger Tour events, winning some matches of those tournaments. He ended 2011 as ranked world no. 327.

=== 2012: Major debut, First ATP win ===
Moriya failed to qualify for French Open and Wimbledon, but he qualified for the 2012 US Open to make his Grand Slam main draw debut, losing to Ivan Dodig in the first round.

During the Asian hardcourt swing, he defeated Robin Haase in the Thailand Open to record his first ATP main draw win, and played a close match against Stanislas Wawrinka at the Japan Open, losing 5–7, 6–4, 4–6. In November, Moriya reached his first ATP Challenger Tour final in Toyota, where he lost to Michał Przysiężny in straight sets.

=== 2013: Davis Cup debut ===
He represented Japan for the first time in his career at the 2013 Davis Cup Asia/Oceania Zone Group I against South Korea. He played the doubles rubber with Yasutaka Uchiyama and Japan advanced into the World Group play-offs.

Moriya was the runner-up of Shanghai Challenger, losing to his countryman Yuichi Sugita in the final, and he made quarterfinals or better of Asian Challenger events in this year.

=== 2014: First Challenger title and Top 150 ===
In Australian hard court season, Moriya reached the final in the Burnie Challenger for the third time at this level and the semifinal in West Lakes.

Moriya won his first challenger title, winning the $50,000+H Granby Challenger event in Canada by beating Fabrice Martin in the final. Following this tournament, he entered the ATP rankings top 150. In the Asian swing, Moriya competed in the ATP events of Kuala Lumpur and Tokyo, both losing in the first round.

=== 2015: Second ATP win ===
In the 2015 Australian Open, despite losing of the qualifying round, Moriya entered into main draw as lucky loser replacing Juan Martín del Potro. He was eliminated in the first round by Jerzy Janowicz with four sets.

He won through the qualifying at the 2015 Wimbledon Championships, dropping just one set, but lost to ninth seed and reigning US Open champion Marin Čilić in the opening round. In September, Moriya reached the second round of the Shenzhen Open, beating Ričardas Berankis in straight sets. He lost to third seed Tommy Robredo.

=== 2022: First ATP 500 win ===
During the Asian hardcourt swing, Moriya entered the 2022 Korea Open and the 2022 Rakuten Japan Open Tennis Championships after qualifying for the singles main draw as a lucky loser. In the latter he defeated compatriot fellow qualifier Yuta Shimizu for his first ATP 500 and Tokyo Open win and third ATP win overall. As a result, he moved 40 positions up the rankings into the top 250.

== ATP Challenger and ITF Tour finals ==
=== Singles: 27 (11–16) ===
| Legend (singles) ATP Challenger Tour (3–6) ITF Futures/World Tennis Tour (8–10) | Titles by surface Hard (8–12) Clay (1–2) Grass (1–0) Carpet (1–2) |

| Result | W–L | Date | Tournament | Tier | Surface | Opponent | Score |
|---|---|---|---|---|---|---|---|
| Loss | 0–1 | Oct 2008 | Japan F11, Tokyo | Futures | Hard | (Japan) Yūichi Sugita | 2–6, 5–7 |
| Win | 1–1 | Jun 2009 | Japan F5, Kusatsu | Futures | Carpet | (Japan) Hiroki Kondo | 6–2, 6–2 |
| Loss | 1–2 | Jun 2009 | Japan F6, Akishima | Futures | Carpet | (Chinese Taipei) Yi Chu-huan | 7–5, 2–6, 2–6 |
| Loss | 1–3 | Mar 2010 | Japan F1, Tokyo | Futures | Hard | (Japan) Yuichi Ito | 5–7, 6–1, 4–6 |
| Loss | 1–4 | Jun 2010 | Japan F5, Karuizawa | Futures | Clay | (Australia) Mark Verryth | 1–6, 4–6 |
| Win | 2–4 | Jul 2010 | Japan F8, Sapporo | Futures | Clay | (Chinese Taipei) Lee Hsin-han | 6–1, 6–3 |
| Loss | 2–5 | Sep 2010 | Australia F6, Darwin | Futures | Hard | (Australia) John Millman | 0–6, 1–6 |
| Loss | 2–6 | Jun 2011 | Japan F6, Kashiwa | Futures | Hard | (Japan) Junn Mitsuhashi | 4–6, 0–6 |
| Loss | 2–7 | Jul 2011 | Japan F8, Sapporo | Futures | Clay | (Japan) Junn Mitsuhashi | 6–7^{(7–9)}, 7–5, 4–6 |
| Win | 3–7 | Jul 2011 | Chinese Taipei F2, Taipei | Futures | Hard | (South Korea) An Jae-sung | 6–3, 4–6, 6–3 |
| Loss | 3–8 | Oct 2011 | Australia F10, Port Pirie | Futures | Hard | (Japan) Yasutaka Uchiyama | 6–7^{(6–8)}, 4–6 |
| Win | 4–8 | Feb 2012 | Australia F2, Mildura | Futures | Grass | (Australia) Brydan Klein | 6–4, 4–6, 6–2 |
| Win | 5–8 | Apr 2012 | Japan F3, Kōfu | Futures | Hard | (Japan) Yasutaka Uchiyama | 6–1, 6–4 |
| Loss | 5–9 | Apr 2012 | Chinese Taipei F2, Kaohsiung | Futures | Hard | (United Kingdom) James Ward | 5–7, 6–7^{(3–7)} |
| Loss | 5–10 | Nov 2012 | Toyota, Japan | Challenger | Carpet (i) | (Poland) Michał Przysiężny | 2–6, 3–6 |
| Loss | 5–11 | Sep 2013 | Shanghai, China, P.R. | Challenger | Hard | (Japan) Yūichi Sugita | 3–6, 3–6 |
| Loss | 5–12 | Feb 2014 | Burnie, Australia | Challenger | Hard | (Australia) Matt Reid | 3–6, 2–6 |
| Win | 6–12 | Jul 2014 | Granby, Canada | Challenger | Hard | (France) Fabrice Martin | 7–5, 6–7^{(4–7)}, 6–3 |
| Win | 7–12 | Sep 2016 | Nanchang, China, P.R. | Challenger | Hard | (South Korea) Chung Hyeon | 4–6, 6–1, 6–4 |
| Loss | 7–13 | Oct 2016 | Ningbo, China, P.R. | Challenger | Hard | (Chinese Taipei) Lu Yen-hsun | 3–6, 1–6 |
| Win | 8–13 | Apr 2018 | Uzbekistan F2, Bukhara | Futures | Hard | (Russia) Evgenii Tiurnev | 6–0, 6–1 |
| Win | 9–13 | May 2018 | Loughborough, Great Britain | Challenger | Hard (i) | (United Kingdom) James Ward | 6–2, 7–5 |
| Loss | 9–14 | Sep 2018 | Shanghai, China, P.R. | Challenger | Hard | (Slovenia) Blaž Kavčič | 1–6, 6–7^{(1–7)} |
| Loss | 9–15 | Nov 2021 | Roanne, France | Challenger | Hard | (France) Hugo Grenier | 2–6, 3–6 |
| Win | 10-15 | Apr 2022 | M25, Nottingham, UK | World Tennis Tour | Hard (i) | (France) Antoine Escoffier | 3–6, 6–0, 6–2 |
| Loss | 10-16 | Jun 2023 | M25, Jakarta, Indonesia | World Tennis Tour | Hard | (Turkey) Yanki Erel | 3–6, 6–4, 2–6 |
| Win | 11-16 | Jun 2023 | M25, Nakhon Si Thammarat, Thailand | World Tennis Tour | Hard | (Thailand) Kasidit Samrej | 2–6, 6–2, 6–2 |

=== Doubles: 10 (5–5) ===
| Legend (doubles) ATP Challenger Tour (0–2) ITF Futures Tour (5–3) | Titles by surface Hard (4–4) Clay (0–1) Grass (0–0) Carpet (1–0) |

| Result | W–L | Date | Tournament | Tier | Surface | Partner | Opponents | Score |
|---|---|---|---|---|---|---|---|---|
| Loss | 0–1 | Aug 2009 | Thailand F2, Nonthaburi | Futures | Hard | (Japan) Tasuku Iwami | (Indonesia) Nesa Arta (Indonesia) Christopher Rungkat | 6–4, 4–6, [10–12] |
| Win | 1–1 | Apr 2010 | Japan F4, Tsukuba | Futures | Hard | (Japan) Tasuku Iwami | (Japan) Bumpei Sato (United States) Maciek Sykut | 6–4, 6–2 |
| Loss | 1–2 | May 2011 | Italy F10, Aosta | Futures | Clay | (Japan) Shuichi Sekiguchi | (Moldova) Radu Albot (Japan) Yasutaka Uchiyama | 6–4, 5–7, [7–10] |
| Win | 2–2 | Feb 2012 | Germany F4, Nußloch | Futures | Carpet (i) | (Japan) Yasutaka Uchiyama | (Germany) Marko Lenz (Germany) George von Massow | 7–6^{(7–4)}, 6–3 |
| Loss | 2–3 | Apr 2013 | China F2, Chengdu | Futures | Hard | (Japan) Yasutaka Uchiyama | (China) Gong Maoxin (China) Zeng Shaoxuan | 7–6^{(7–4)}, 3–6, [8–10] |
| Win | 3–3 | Apr 2013 | China F3, Yuxi | Futures | Hard | (Japan) Yasutaka Uchiyama | (Australia) Brydan Klein (New Zealand) Jose Statham | 2–6, 6–4, [10–6] |
| Loss | 3–4 | Feb 2019 | Launceston, Australia | Challenger | Hard | (Egypt) Mohamed Safwat | (Australia) Max Purcell (Australia) Luke Saville | 5–7, 4–6 |
| Loss | 3–5 | Feb 2019 | Bangkok, Thailand | Challenger | Hard | (Spain) Enrique López Pérez | (China) Li Zhe (Portugal) Gonçalo Oliveira | 2–6, 1–6 |
| Win | 4–5 | Jun 2023 | M25 Jakarta, Indonesia | World Tennis Tour | Hard | (Philippines) Francis Casey Alcantara | (Indonesia) Nathan Anthony Barki (Indonesia) Christopher Rungkat | 6–2, 6–1 |
| Win | 5–5 | Jun 2023 | M25 Nakhon Si Thammarat, Thailand | World Tennis Tour | Hard | (Philippines) Francis Casey Alcantara | (Thailand) Maximus Jones (New Zealand) Finn Reynolds | 6–2, 6–4 |
