= ATP Challenger China International – Nanchang =

- 2019 ATP Challenger China International – Nanchang

Defunct tennis tournament
- Location: Nanchang, China
- Venue: Zhongchang Rednet Center
- Category: ATP Challenger Tour
- Surface: Clay (i)
- Draw: 32S/24Q/16D
- Prize money: $50,000+H

The ATP Challenger China International – Nanchang, known as Honggutan China International Challenger Nanchang, was a tennis tournament held in Nanchang, China since 2014. The event was part of the ATP Challenger Tour and in 2018 and in 2019 was played on indoor clay courts. Until 2016, the event was held on hardcourts at the Jiangxi International Sports Center.

The 2015 tournament took place at the Nanchang International Sports Center between 12 September and 20 September. There were 85 contestants from 27 countries and regions. The 2016 tournament featured people from 20 countries and regions.

== Past finals ==
=== Singles ===
Year	Champion	Runner-up	Score
2019	(Slovakia) Andrej Martin	(Australia) Jordan Thompson	6–4, 1–6, 6–3
2018	(France) Quentin Halys	(France) Calvin Hemery	6–3, 6–2
2016	(Japan) Hiroki Moriya	(South Korea) Chung Hyeon	4–6, 6–1, 6–4
2015	(Germany) Peter Gojowczyk	(Israel) Amir Weintraub	6–2, 6–1
2014	(Japan) Go Soeda	(Slovenia) Blaž Kavčič	6–3, 2–6, 7–6^{(7–3)}

=== Doubles ===
Year	Champions	Runners-up	Score
2019	(Netherlands) Sander Arends (Austria) Tristan-Samuel Weissborn	(Australia) Alex Bolt (Australia) Akira Santillan	6–2, 6–4
2018	(China) Gong Maoxin (China) Zhang Ze	(Philippines) Ruben Gonzales (Indonesia) Christopher Rungkat	3–6, 7–6^{(9–7)}, [10–7]
2016	(China) Wu Di (China) Zhang Zhizhen	(Colombia) Nicolás Barrientos (Philippines) Ruben Gonzales	7–6^{(7–4)}, 6–3
2015	(France) Jonathan Eysseric (Estonia) Jürgen Zopp	(Chinese Taipei) Lee Hsin-han (Israel) Amir Weintraub	6–4, 6–2
2014	(Chinese Taipei) Chen Ti (Chinese Taipei) Peng Hsien-yin	(Australia) Jordan Kerr (France) Fabrice Martin	6–2, 3–6, [12–10]
