= 2018 Bangkok Challenger II – Doubles =

Doubles
- 2018 Bangkok Challenger II

Final
- Champions: (United States) James Cerretani (United Kingdom) Joe Salisbury
- Runners-up: (Spain) Enrique López Pérez (Spain) Pedro Martínez
- Score: 6–7^{(5–7)}, 6–3, [10–8]

Events
Singles	Doubles
← 2017 ·	Bangkok Challenger II	· 2019 →

Sanchai and Sonchat Ratiwatana were the defending champions but lost in the quarterfinals to Hsieh Cheng-peng and Yang Tsung-hua.

James Cerretani and Joe Salisbury won the title after defeating Enrique López Pérez and Pedro Martínez 6–7^{(5–7)}, 6–3, [10–8] in the final.

== Seeds ==
1. (Thailand) Sanchai Ratiwatana / (Thailand) Sonchat Ratiwatana (quarterfinals)
2. (United States) James Cerretani / (United Kingdom) Joe Salisbury (champions)
3. (India) Jeevan Nedunchezhiyan / (Indonesia) Christopher Rungkat (quarterfinals)
4. (Japan) Toshihide Matsui / (Chinese Taipei) Yi Chu-huan (first round)

== Draw ==
=== Key ===
- Q = Qualifier
- WC = Wild card
- LL = Lucky loser
- Alt = Alternate
- SE = Special exempt
- PR = Protected ranking
- ITF = ITF entry
- JE = Junior exempt
- w/o = Walkover
- r = Retired
- d = Defaulted
- SR = Special ranking

First round
1	(Thailand) Sa Ratiwatana (Thailand) So Ratiwatana	6	6
(Denmark) F Nielsen (Republic of Ireland) D O'Hare	3	4
(Chinese Taipei) C-p Hsieh (Chinese Taipei) T-h Yang	3	6	[11]
(Croatia) I Sabanov (Croatia) M Sabanov	6	3	[9]
3	(India) J Nedunchezhiyan (Indonesia) C Rungkat	6	6
(Chinese Taipei) T Chen (Italy) F Cipolla	0	2
(Spain) G Granollers (Spain) D Marrero	4	5
(Spain) E López Pérez (Spain) P Martínez	6	7
(Russia) I Nedelko (Croatia) N Serdarušić	4	4
(Russia) M Elgin (Kazakhstan) T Khabibulin	6	6
(China) M Gong (Chinese Taipei) H-y Peng	7^{7}	6
4	(Japan) T Matsui (Chinese Taipei) C-h Yi	6^{2}	2
WC	(Thailand) P Isaro (Thailand) W Trongcharoenchaikul	6	3	[11]
WC	(Thailand) Congsup Congcar (Thailand) K Wachiramanowong	1	6	[9]
WC	(Thailand) Phassawit Burapharitta (Thailand) Chayanon Kaewsuto	5	1
2	(United States) J Cerretani (United Kingdom) J Salisbury	7	6

Quarterfinals
1	(Thailand) Sa Ratiwatana (Thailand) So Ratiwatana	4	6^{6}
(Chinese Taipei) C-p Hsieh (Chinese Taipei) T-h Yang	6	7^{8}
3	(India) J Nedunchezhiyan (Indonesia) C Rungkat	6^{4}	6^{3}
(Spain) E López Pérez (Spain) P Martínez	7^{7}	7^{7}
(Russia) M Elgin (Kazakhstan) T Khabibulin	3	6	[4]
(China) M Gong (Chinese Taipei) H-y Peng	6	3	[10]
WC	(Thailand) P Isaro (Thailand) W Trongcharoenchaikul	4	2
2	(United States) J Cerretani (United Kingdom) J Salisbury	6	6

Semifinals
(Chinese Taipei) C-p Hsieh (Chinese Taipei) T-h Yang	4	4
(Spain) E López Pérez (Spain) P Martínez	6	6
(China) M Gong (Chinese Taipei) H-y Peng	6^{7}	3
2	(United States) J Cerretani (United Kingdom) J Salisbury	7^{9}	6

Final
(Spain) E López Pérez (Spain) P Martínez	7^{7}	3	[8]
2	(United States) J Cerretani (United Kingdom) J Salisbury	6^{5}	6	[10]
