= 2018 Bangkok Challenger II – Singles =

Singles
- 2018 Bangkok Challenger II

Final
- Champion: (Spain) Marcel Granollers
- Runner-up: (Spain) Enrique López Pérez
- Score: 4–6, 6–2, 6–0

Events
Singles	Doubles
← 2017 ·	Bangkok Challenger II	· 2019 →

Janko Tipsarević was the defending champion but chose not to defend his title.

Marcel Granollers won the title after defeating Enrique López Pérez 4–6, 6–2, 6–0 in the final.

== Seeds ==
1. (Spain) Marcel Granollers (champion)
2. (Spain) Enrique López Pérez (final)
3. (Spain) Pedro Martínez (quarterfinals)
4. (Chinese Taipei) Yang Tsung-hua (first round)
5. (Russia) Ivan Nedelko (first round)
6. (Germany) Mats Moraing (semifinals)
7. (Japan) Yusuke Takahashi (quarterfinals)
8. (Italy) Matteo Viola (quarterfinals)

== Draw ==
=== Key ===
- Q = Qualifier
- WC = Wild card
- LL = Lucky loser
- Alt = Alternate
- SE = Special exempt
- PR = Protected ranking
- ITF = ITF entry
- JE = Junior exempt
- w/o = Walkover
- r = Retired
- d = Defaulted
- SR = Special ranking

=== Finals ===
Semifinals
1	(Spain) Marcel Granollers	6	6
(Spain) Bernabé Zapata Miralles	3	0
6	(Germany) Mats Moraing	7^{7}	1	6^{6}
2	(Spain) Enrique López Pérez	6^{3}	6	7^{8}

Final
1	(Spain) Marcel Granollers	4	6	6
2	(Spain) Enrique López Pérez	6	2	0

=== Top half ===
First round
1	(Spain) M Granollers	6	6
WC	(Thailand) Pol Wattanakul	2	0
(Zimbabwe) B Lock	4	2
PR	(Italy) F Cipolla	6	6
Q	(Finland) E Ruusuvuori	6	3	7
(Belgium) Y Mertens	4	6	5
(India) S Mukund	2	7	0
7	(Japan) Y Takahashi	6	5	6
4	(Chinese Taipei) T-h Yang	4	3
Q	(Denmark) F Nielsen	6	6
(Russia) E Karlovskiy	6	7
(Germany) D Köpfer	2	5
(Turkey) M İlhan	6	6
(Japan) K Takeuchi	1	2
(Spain) B Zapata Miralles	5	6	7
5	(Russia) I Nedelko	7	2	5

Second round
1	(Spain) M Granollers	6	6
PR	(Italy) F Cipolla	3	1
Q	(Finland) E Ruusuvuori	6	3	3
7	(Japan) Y Takahashi	3	6	6
Q	(Denmark) F Nielsen	4	2
(Russia) E Karlovskiy	6	6
(Turkey) M İlhan	3	3
(Spain) B Zapata Miralles	6	6

Quarterfinals
1	(Spain) M Granollers	6	6
7	(Japan) Y Takahashi	4	1
(Russia) E Karlovskiy	3	2
(Spain) B Zapata Miralles	6	6

Semifinals
1	(Spain) M Granollers	6	6
(Spain) B Zapata Miralles	3	0

=== Bottom half ===
First round
6	(Germany) Mats Moraing	6	6
Q	(Japan) Yuya Kibi	2	2
WC	(Thailand) P Isaro	6	6
WC	(Thailand) Thanapet Chanta	0	2
(Canada) S Diez	6^{8}	4
(Spain) G Granollers	7^{10}	6
(Spain) G Olaso	4	4
3	(Spain) P Martínez	6	6
8	(Italy) M Viola	6	6
(Croatia) N Serdarušić	3	2
(Thailand) W Trongcharoenchaikul	7^{7}	6
Q	(India) Sidharth Rawat	6^{3}	3
WC	(Thailand) Congsup Congcar	5	4
(Italy) A Bega	7	6
(Chinese Taipei) T Chen	2	3
2	(Spain) E López Pérez	6	6

Second round
6	(Germany) M Moraing	6	6
WC	(Thailand) P Isaro	2	3
(Spain) G Granollers	6	4	5
3	(Spain) P Martínez	3	6	7
8	(Italy) M Viola	6	7^{8}
(Thailand) W Trongcharoenchaikul	4	6^{6}
(Italy) A Bega	3	4
2	(Spain) E López Pérez	6	6

Quarterfinals
6	(Germany) M Moraing	6	7
3	(Spain) P Martínez	0	5
8	(Italy) M Viola	5	6^{4}
2	(Spain) E López Pérez	7	7^{7}

Semifinals
6	(Germany) M Moraing	7^{7}	1	6^{6}
2	(Spain) E López Pérez	6^{3}	6	7^{8}
