= 2019 Bangkok Challenger II – Singles =

Singles
- 2019 Bangkok Challenger II

Final
- Champion: (Australia) James Duckworth
- Runner-up: (Spain) Alejandro Davidovich Fokina
- Score: 6–4, 6–3

Events
Singles	Doubles
- Bangkok Challenger II

Marcel Granollers was the defending champion but chose not to defend his title.

James Duckworth won the title after defeating Alejandro Davidovich Fokina 6–4, 6–3 in the final.

== Seeds ==
All seeds receive a bye into the second round.

1. (India) Prajnesh Gunneswaran (semifinals)
2. (Japan) Tatsuma Ito (second round, retired)
3. (Switzerland) Henri Laaksonen (second round, retired)
4. (Japan) Yūichi Sugita (third round)
5. (Japan) Hiroki Moriya (quarterfinals)
6. (Kazakhstan) Aleksandr Nedovyesov (second round)
7. (Germany) Tobias Kamke (second round)
8. (China) Zhang Ze (third round)
9. (Japan) Go Soeda (quarterfinals)
10. (Italy) Gianluca Mager (quarterfinals, retired)
11. (Australia) Marc Polmans (third round)
12. (Serbia) Viktor Troicki (third round)
13. (Israel) Dudi Sela (semifinals)
14. (Spain) Alejandro Davidovich Fokina (final)
15. (Australia) James Duckworth (champion)
16. (South Korea) Kwon Soon-woo (third round)

== Draw ==
Key

- Q = Qualifier
- WC = Wild card
- LL = Lucky loser
- Alt = Alternate
- ITF = ITF entry
- PR = Protected ranking
- SR = Special ranking
- SE = Special exempt
- JE = Junior exempt
- JR = Junior Accelerator Programme entrant
- CO = College Accelerator Programme entrant
- NG = Next Gen Accelerator Program entrant
- w/o = Walkover
- r = Retired
- d = Defaulted

=== Finals ===
Quarterfinals
1	(India) Prajnesh Gunneswaran	6	6
9	(Japan) Go Soeda	3	3
15	(Australia) James Duckworth	4	7^{9}	5
10	(Italy) Gianluca Mager	6	6^{7}	0^{r}
5	(Japan) Hiroki Moriya	2	6	2
14	(Spain) Alejandro Davidovich Fokina	6	0	6
(China) Li Zhe	2	2
13	(Israel) Dudi Sela	6	6

Semifinals
1	(India) Prajnesh Gunneswaran	6^{2}	6	6^{3}
15	(Australia) James Duckworth	7^{7}	3	7^{7}
14	(Spain) Alejandro Davidovich Fokina	6^{5}	6	6
13	(Israel) Dudi Sela	7^{7}	4	3

Final
15	(Australia) James Duckworth	6	6
14	(Spain) Alejandro Davidovich Fokina	4	3

=== Top half ===
==== Section 1 ====
First round
ITF	(Kazakhstan) D Yevseyev	7	6
Q	(China) Y Bai	5	4
(Australia) M Banes	2	6	6^{3}
(Portugal) G Oliveira	6	3	7^{7}
ITF	(Spain) O Roca Batalla	6^{4}	6	0
ITF	(Spain) D Pérez Sanz	7^{7}	2	0^{r}
(Netherlands) T de Bakker	6	3	6
LL	(Tunisia) M Echargui	3	6	0

Second round
1	(India) P Gunneswaran	7	3	6
ITF	(Kazakhstan) D Yevseyev	5	6	4
(Portugal) G Oliveira	2	7^{7}	1
16	(South Korea) S-w Kwon	6	6^{3}	6
9	(Japan) G Soeda	6	6
ITF	(Spain) O Roca Batalla	4	1
(Netherlands) T de Bakker	6^{2}	6	6
6	(Kazakhstan) A Nedovyesov	7^{7}	4	4

Third round
1	(India) P Gunneswaran	7^{7}	6
16	(South Korea) S-w Kwon	6^{5}	4
9	(Japan) G Soeda	6^{4}	6	6
(Netherlands) T de Bakker	7^{7}	2	2

Quarterfinals
1	(India) P Gunneswaran	6	6
9	(Japan) G Soeda	3	3

==== Section 2 ====
First round
(New Zealand) R Statham	4	5^{r}
ITF	(Bulgaria) D Kuzmanov	6	5
(Chinese Taipei) T-h Yang	3	5
(India) S Myneni	6	7
(South Korea) Y-s Chung	6	6
(Argentina) P Cachin	2	1
(India) S Mukund	7	4	2
(United States) K King	5	6	6

Second round
3	(Switzerland) H Laaksonen	6	4	0^{r}
ITF	(Bulgaria) D Kuzmanov	4	6	2
(India) S Myneni	4	0
15	(Australia) J Duckworth	6	6
10	(Italy) G Mager	6	6
(South Korea) Y-s Chung	4	4
(United States) K King	6^{3}	3
8	(China) Ze Zhang	7^{7}	6

Third round
ITF	(Bulgaria) D Kuzmanov	3	1
15	(Australia) J Duckworth	6	6
10	(Italy) G Mager	6	6^{4}	6
8	(China) Ze Zhang	2	7^{7}	4

Quarterfinals
15	(Australia) J Duckworth	4	7^{9}	5
10	(Italy) G Mager	6	6^{7}	0^{r}

=== Bottom half ===
==== Section 3 ====
First round
(Portugal) G Elias	4	1
Q	(Russia) I Gakhov	6	6
(France) S Robert	3	6	6
WC	(Thailand) P Isaro	6	1	3
(South Korea) D-h Lee	6	7^{7}
WC	(Thailand) Thanapet Chanta	2	6^{4}
WC	(Thailand) P Kovapitukted	4	2
(China) D Wu	6	6

Second round
5	(Japan) H Moriya	6	7^{14}
Q	(Russia) I Gakhov	4	6^{12}
(France) S Robert	4	4
12	(Serbia) V Troicki	6	6
14	(Spain) A Davidovich Fokina	6	6
(South Korea) D-h Lee	4	2
(China) D Wu	2	4
4	(Japan) Y Sugita	6	6

Third round
5	(Japan) H Moriya	6	3	6
12	(Serbia) V Troicki	2	6	1
14	(Spain) A Davidovich Fokina	6	6
4	(Japan) Y Sugita	2	1

Quarterfinals
5	(Japan) H Moriya	2	6	2
14	(Spain) A Davidovich Fokina	6	0	6

==== Section 4 ====
First round
WC	(Thailand) W Trongcharoenchaikul	6	1	4
(China) Z Li	4	6	6
(Australia) M Purcell	3	1
(Japan) K Uchida	6	6
(Dominican Republic) J Hernández-Fernández	5	2
(France) E Couacaud	7	6
(Spain) E López Pérez	2	2
(United States) JC Aragone	6	6

Second round
7	(Germany) T Kamke	2	3
(China) Z Li	6	6
(Japan) K Uchida	2	5
11	(Australia) M Polmans	6	7
13	(Israel) D Sela	6	6
(France) E Couacaud	2	3
(United States) JC Aragone	5
2	(Japan) T Ito	0^{r}

Third round
(China) Z Li	6	6
11	(Australia) M Polmans	3	4
13	(Israel) D Sela	7	6
(United States) JC Aragone	5	2

Quarterfinals
(China) Z Li	2	2
13	(Israel) D Sela	6	6
