= 2016 KPN Bangkok Open II – Doubles =

Doubles
- 2016 KPN Bangkok Open II

Final
- Champions: (Netherlands) Wesley Koolhof (Netherlands) Matwé Middelkoop
- Runners-up: (Germany) Gero Kretschmer (Germany) Alexander Satschko
- Score: 6–3, 7–6^{(7–1)}

Events
Singles	Doubles
KPN Bangkok Open II	· 2017 →

Top seeds Wesley Koolhof and Matwé Middelkoop won the title, beating Gero Kretschmer and Alexander Satschko 6–3, 7–6^{(7–1)}

== Seeds ==
1. (Netherlands) Wesley Koolhof / (Netherlands) Matwé Middelkoop (champions)
2. (Brazil) Marcelo Demoliner / (Slovakia) Igor Zelenay (first round)
3. (Germany) Gero Kretschmer / (Germany) Alexander Satschko (final)
4. (United Kingdom) Ken Skupski / (United Kingdom) Neal Skupski (semifinals)

== Draw ==
=== Key ===
- Q = Qualifier
- WC = Wild card
- LL = Lucky loser
- Alt = Alternate
- SE = Special exempt
- PR = Protected ranking
- ITF = ITF entry
- JE = Junior exempt
- w/o = Walkover
- r = Retired
- d = Defaulted
- SR = Special ranking

First round
1	(Netherlands) W Koolhof (Netherlands) M Middelkoop	6	6
(Thailand) Sa Ratiwatana (Thailand) So Ratiwatana	3	3
WC	(Thailand) Natthasith Kunsuwan (Thailand) Jatuporn Nalamphun	3	2
(Croatia) N Mektić (Croatia) A Šančić	6	6
4	(United Kingdom) K Skupski (United Kingdom) N Skupski	6	7^{9}
(France) F Martin (India) S Singh	2	6^{7}
(Poland) M Kowalczyk (Croatia) D Marcan	2	1
(Sweden) J Brunström (Sweden) A Siljeström	6	6
WC	(Japan) T Matsui (Thailand) K Wachiramanowong	1	7	[10]
(Czech Republic) F Čermák (India) D Sharan	6	5	[5]
(South Africa) D O'Brien (South Africa) R Roelofse	6	3	[8]
3	(Germany) G Kretschmer (Germany) A Satschko	4	6	[10]
WC	(Thailand) Nattan Benjasupawan (Thailand) W Trongcharoenchaikul	4	5
(Serbia) I Bozoljac (Netherlands) M Vervoort	6	7
PR	(India) M Bhupathi (India) P Raja	6	1	[10]
2	(Brazil) M Demoliner (Slovakia) I Zelenay	4	6	[6]

Quarterfinals
1	(Netherlands) W Koolhof (Netherlands) M Middelkoop	6	4	[10]
(Croatia) N Mektić (Croatia) A Šančić	4	6	[7]
4	(United Kingdom) K Skupski (United Kingdom) N Skupski	3	7^{7}	[10]
(Sweden) J Brunström (Sweden) A Siljeström	6	6^{4}	[8]
WC	(Japan) T Matsui (Thailand) K Wachiramanowong	6^{3}	3
3	(Germany) G Kretschmer (Germany) A Satschko	7^{7}	6
(Serbia) I Bozoljac (Netherlands) M Vervoort	6	1	[5]
PR	(India) M Bhupathi (India) P Raja	2	6	[10]

Semifinals
1	(Netherlands) W Koolhof (Netherlands) M Middelkoop	7^{7}	6
4	(United Kingdom) K Skupski (United Kingdom) N Skupski	6^{3}	3
3	(Germany) G Kretschmer (Germany) A Satschko	7	6
PR	(India) M Bhupathi (India) P Raja	5	3

Final
1	(Netherlands) W Koolhof (Netherlands) M Middelkoop	6	7^{7}
3	(Germany) G Kretschmer (Germany) A Satschko	3	6^{1}
