= 2016 KPN Bangkok Open II – Singles =

Singles
- 2016 KPN Bangkok Open II

Final
- Champion: (Russia) Mikhail Youzhny
- Runner-up: (Czech Republic) Adam Pavlásek
- Score: 6–4, 6–1

Events
Singles	Doubles
KPN Bangkok Open II	· 2017 →

Top seed Mikhail Youzhny claimed his second back to back ATP Challenger Tour title, having won the 2016 KPN Bangkok Open a week earlier. He beat Adam Pavlásek 6–4, 6–1 in the final.

== Seeds ==
1. (Russia) Mikhail Youzhny (champion)
2. (Czech Republic) Adam Pavlásek (final)
3. (Chinese Taipei) Jason Jung (semifinals)
4. (France) Yannick Jankovits (first round)
5. (Poland) Kamil Majchrzak (first round)
6. (India) Sanam Singh (first round)
7. (Italy) Matteo Viola (second round)
8. (France) Maxime Teixeira (first round)

== Draw ==
=== Key ===
- Q = Qualifier
- WC = Wild card
- LL = Lucky loser
- Alt = Alternate
- SE = Special exempt
- PR = Protected ranking
- ITF = ITF entry
- JE = Junior exempt
- w/o = Walkover
- r = Retired
- d = Defaulted
- SR = Special ranking

=== Finals ===
Semifinals
1	(Russia) Mikhail Youzhny	6	6
3	(Chinese Taipei) Jason Jung	1	2
(Portugal) Frederico Ferreira Silva	4	3
2	(Czech Republic) Adam Pavlásek	6	6

Final
1	(Russia) Mikhail Youzhny	6	6
2	(Czech Republic) Adam Pavlásek	4	1

=== Top half ===
First round
1	(Russia) M Youzhny	6	6
Q	(Denmark) F Nielsen	4	3
(Russia) D Medvedev	6^{4}	6	7^{6}
WC	(Thailand) W Trongcharoenchaikul	7^{7}	4	6^{2}
Q	(Austria) M Neuchrist	1	6	6
(Russia) A Vatutin	6	2	1
Q	(United Kingdom) J Milton	6	6
5	(Poland) K Majchrzak	3	2
3	(Chinese Taipei) J Jung	6	3	6
(Croatia) N Mektić	4	6	4
LL	(Monaco) B Balleret	6	7
WC	(Thailand) S Ratiwatana	3	5
WC	(Thailand) K Wachiramanowong	4	5
(Serbia) M Tepavac	6	7
(Georgia (country)) A Metreveli	6	1	6
6	(India) S Singh	2	6	4

Second round
1	(Russia) M Youzhny	6	6
(Russia) D Medvedev	2	3
Q	(Austria) M Neuchrist	4	3
Q	(United Kingdom) J Milton	6	6
3	(Chinese Taipei) J Jung	6	6
LL	(Monaco) B Balleret	2	2
(Serbia) M Tepavac	6	4	0^{r}
(Georgia (country)) A Metreveli	3	6	2

Quarterfinals
1	(Russia) M Youzhny	6	6
Q	(United Kingdom) J Milton	0	2
3	(Chinese Taipei) J Jung	6	6
(Georgia (country)) A Metreveli	3	3

Semifinals
1	(Russia) M Youzhny	6	6
3	(Chinese Taipei) J Jung	1	2

=== Bottom half ===
First round
7	(Italy) M Viola	6	7
(South Africa) T Vorster	2	5
(Portugal) FF Silva	6	6
WC	(Thailand) Nattan Benjasupawan	3	0
(Serbia) M Janković	4	7^{8}	7^{7}
PR	(Russia) R Safiullin	6	6^{6}	6^{2}
Q	(South Korea) Kim Cheong-eui	4	6	6
4	(France) Y Jankovits	6	1	3
8	(France) M Teixeira	1	0^{r}
(United Kingdom) L Broady	6	2
(Belarus) D Zhyrmont	1	6	6
(Spain) G Granollers	6	1	2
(Czech Republic) Robin Staněk	6	6
(Russia) I Nedelko	4	4
(Chinese Taipei) J Wang	4	1
2	(Czech Republic) A Pavlásek	6	6

Second round
7	(Italy) M Viola	4	2
(Portugal) FF Silva	6	6
(Serbia) M Janković	6^{5}	1^{r}
Q	(South Korea) C-e Kim	7^{7}	5
(United Kingdom) L Broady	6^{0}	0
(Belarus) D Zhyrmont	7^{7}	6
(Czech Republic) R Staněk	6	4	1
2	(Czech Republic) A Pavlásek	3	6	6

Quarterfinals
(Portugal) FF Silva	6	6
Q	(South Korea) C-e Kim	4	3
(Belarus) D Zhyrmont	6	2	5
2	(Czech Republic) A Pavlásek	0	6	7

Semifinals
(Portugal) FF Silva	4	3
2	(Czech Republic) A Pavlásek	6	6
