= 2016 Wind Energy Holding Bangkok Open – Singles =

Singles
- 2016 Wind Energy Holding Bangkok Open

Final
- Champion: (Slovenia) Blaž Kavčič
- Runner-up: (Japan) Go Soeda
- Score: 6–0, 1–0 ret.

Events
Singles	Doubles
- Wind Energy Holding Bangkok Open

This was the first edition of the tournament.

Blaž Kavčič won the title after defeating Go Soeda in the final 6–0, 1–0 retired.

== Seeds ==
1. (Japan) Go Soeda (final, retired)
2. (China) Wu Di (quarterfinals)
3. (South Korea) Lee Duck-hee (first round)
4. (Israel) Amir Weintraub (second round)
5. (China) Li Zhe (second round)
6. (Chinese Taipei) Chen Ti (quarterfinals)
7. (Germany) Marc Sieber (second round)
8. (Japan) Yuya Kibi (quarterfinals)

== Draw ==
Key

- Q = Qualifier
- WC = Wild card
- LL = Lucky loser
- Alt = Alternate
- ITF = ITF entry
- PR = Protected ranking
- SR = Special ranking
- SE = Special exempt
- JE = Junior exempt
- JR = Junior Accelerator Programme entrant
- CO = College Accelerator Programme entrant
- NG = Next Gen Accelerator Program entrant
- w/o = Walkover
- r = Retired
- d = Defaulted

=== Finals ===
Semifinals
1	(Japan) Go Soeda	6	6
(Australia) Marinko Matosevic	3	2
(Slovenia) Blaž Kavčič	6	7^{7}
(Slovakia) Norbert Gombos	4	6^{2}

Final
1	(Japan) Go Soeda	0	0^{r}
(Slovenia) Blaž Kavčič	6	1

=== Top half ===
First round
1	(Japan) G Soeda	6	6
(Turkey) C İlkel	2	1
(Belgium) Julien Dubail	5	6^{3}
(Australia) B Mott	7	7^{7}
(India) V Vardhan	7	4	4
WC	(Thailand) Phassawit Burapharitta	5	6	1^{r}
(South Africa) L Harris	5	1
6	(Chinese Taipei) T Chen	7	6
3	(South Korea) D-h Lee	4	0
(India) P Gunneswaran	6	6
(Israel) E Leshem	6	3	6
Q	(Belarus) S Betov	3	6	1
(Australia) B Mousley	2	4
(Australia) M Matosevic	6	6
(Japan) Shuichi Sekiguchi	6^{5}	3
5	(China) Z Li	7^{7}	6

Second round
1	(Japan) G Soeda	6	5	6
(Australia) B Mott	2	7	4
(India) V Vardhan	3	1
6	(Chinese Taipei) T Chen	6	6
(India) P Gunneswaran	6	3	5
(Israel) E Leshem	4	6	7
(Australia) M Matosevic	6	6
5	(China) Z Li	2	2

Quarterfinals
1	(Japan) G Soeda	6	6
6	(Chinese Taipei) T Chen	4	3
(Israel) E Leshem	2	0
(Australia) M Matosevic	6	6

Semifinals
1	(Japan) G Soeda	6	6
(Australia) M Matosevic	3	2

=== Bottom half ===
First round
8	(Japan) Yuya Kibi	4	6	6
(Japan) T Niki	6	3	2
WC	(Thailand) W Trongcharoenchaikul	1	6^{5}
WC	(Thailand) J Navasirisomboon	6	7^{7}
(Slovenia) B Kavčič	7	6
(Japan) Y Uchiyama	5	4
(Ukraine) D Molchanov	5	1
4	(Israel) A Weintraub	7	6
7	(Germany) Marc Sieber	6	6
Q	(United States) Connor Farren	2	2
(Slovakia) N Gombos	3	7^{7}	6
(India) S Singh	6	6^{4}	2
Q	(China) X Gao	6	6
Q	(India) Sidharth Rawat	3	4
WC	(Thailand) K Wachiramanowong	1	4
2	(China) D Wu	6	6

Second round
8	(Japan) Y Kibi	6	6
WC	(Thailand) J Navasirisomboon	4	0
(Slovenia) B Kavčič	6	6
4	(Israel) A Weintraub	4	3
7	(Germany) M Sieber	6^{5}	1
(Slovakia) N Gombos	7^{7}	6
Q	(China) X Gao	3	3
2	(China) D Wu	6	6

Quarterfinals
8	(Japan) Y Kibi	2	2
(Slovenia) B Kavčič	6	6
(Slovakia) N Gombos	6	6
2	(China) D Wu	2	2

Semifinals
(Slovenia) B Kavčič	6	7^{7}
(Slovakia) N Gombos	4	6^{2}
