= 2020 Bangkok Challenger II – Singles =

Singles
- 2020 Bangkok Challenger II

Final
- Champion: (Italy) Federico Gaio
- Runner-up: (Netherlands) Robin Haase
- Score: 6–1, 4–6, 4–2 ret.

Events
Singles	Doubles
- Bangkok Challenger II

James Duckworth was the defending champion but chose not to defend his title.

Federico Gaio won the title after Robin Haase retired in the final trailing 1–6, 6–4, 2–4 in the third set.

== Seeds ==
All seeds receive a bye into the second round.

1. (Czech Republic) Jiří Veselý (quarterfinals)
2. (Japan) Go Soeda (third round)
3. (Italy) Paolo Lorenzi (second round)
4. (France) Antoine Hoang (second round)
5. (Hungary) Attila Balázs (third round, retired)
6. (China) Zhang Zhizhen (second round)
7. (Slovakia) Martin Kližan (second round)
8. (Italy) Federico Gaio (champion)
9. (Austria) Sebastian Ofner (second round)
10. (Netherlands) Robin Haase (final, retired)
11. (Italy) Roberto Marcora (second round)
12. (Uzbekistan) Denis Istomin (third round)
13. (Canada) Peter Polansky (third round)
14. (Kazakhstan) Dmitry Popko (semifinals)
15. (India) Ramkumar Ramanathan (quarterfinals)
16. (Netherlands) Botic van de Zandschulp (third round)

== Draw ==
Key

- Q = Qualifier
- WC = Wild card
- LL = Lucky loser
- Alt = Alternate
- ITF = ITF entry
- PR = Protected ranking
- SR = Special ranking
- SE = Special exempt
- JE = Junior exempt
- JR = Junior Accelerator Programme entrant
- CO = College Accelerator Programme entrant
- NG = Next Gen Accelerator Program entrant
- w/o = Walkover
- r = Retired
- d = Defaulted

=== Finals ===
Quarterfinals
1	(Czech Republic) Jiří Veselý	6^{3}	3
8	(Italy) Federico Gaio	7^{7}	6
14	(Kazakhstan) Dmitry Popko	6	6
(Germany) Daniel Altmaier	0	4
(Russia) Roman Safiullin	6	4	3
(France) Hugo Grenier	2	6	6
10	(Netherlands) Robin Haase	7^{7}	6
15	(India) Ramkumar Ramanathan	6^{5}	2

Semifinals
8	(Italy) Federico Gaio	6	6
14	(Kazakhstan) Dmitry Popko	4	3
(France) Hugo Grenier	6^{5}	3
10	(Netherlands) Robin Haase	7^{7}	6

Final
8	(Italy) Federico Gaio	6	4	4
10	(Netherlands) Robin Haase	1	6	2^{r}

=== Top half ===
==== Section 1 ====
First round
WC	(Thailand) Thanapet Chanta	6^{3}	0
(Czech Republic) Z Kolář	7^{7}	6
(Kazakhstan) D Yevseyev	6	6
WC	(Thailand) P Kovapitukted	3	1
(Colombia) S Giraldo	6	4
(Portugal) G Oliveira	0	1^{r}
WC	(Thailand) K Samrej	4	3
Alt	(Japan) K Uchida	6	6

Second round
1	(Czech Republic) J Veselý	6	3	6
(Czech Republic) Z Kolář	4	6	3
(Kazakhstan) D Yevseyev	6^{5}	6	4
16	(Netherlands) B van de Zandschulp	7^{7}	1	6
12	(Uzbekistan) D Istomin	6	7^{9}
(Colombia) S Giraldo	3	6^{7}
Alt	(Japan) K Uchida	6	6^{5}	5
8	(Italy) F Gaio	3	7^{7}	7

Third round
1	(Czech Republic) J Veselý	6	3	6
16	(Netherlands) B van de Zandschulp	3	6	4
12	(Uzbekistan) D Istomin	4	2
8	(Italy) F Gaio	6	6

Quarterfinals
1	(Czech Republic) J Veselý	6^{3}	3
8	(Italy) F Gaio	7^{7}	6

==== Section 2 ====
First round
(South Korea) D-h Lee	1	3
(India) S Mukund	6	6
(Spain) N Kuhn	0	7^{7}	1
Q	(Russia) A Karatsev	6	6^{4}	6
(Russia) E Karlovskiy	6	6
WC	(Thailand) Michael Mathayomchand	3	2
(Germany) D Altmaier	6	6
(Tunisia) M Jaziri	2	1

Second round
3	(Italy) P Lorenzi	3	2
(India) S Mukund	6	6
Q	(Russia) A Karatsev	6	0	4
14	(Kazakhstan) D Popko	4	6	6
9	(Austria) S Ofner	3	2
(Russia) E Karlovskiy	6	6
(Germany) D Altmaier	6	6
7	(Slovakia) M Kližan	3	3

Third round
(India) S Mukund	5	4
14	(Kazakhstan) D Popko	7	6
(Russia) E Karlovskiy	5	6	3
(Germany) D Altmaier	7	4	6

Quarterfinals
14	(Kazakhstan) D Popko	6	6
(Germany) D Altmaier	0	4

=== Bottom half ===
==== Section 3 ====
First round
(Russia) R Safiullin	6	0
(China) Y Bai	1	1^{r}
WC	(Thailand) W Trongcharoenchaikul	5	7^{7}	1
(Italy) GM Moroni	7	6^{4}	0^{r}
(Croatia) V Galović	3	0^{r}
(Japan) Shuichi Sekiguchi	6	3
(France) H Grenier	6	6
PR	(Belgium) A De Greef	1	4

Second round
6	(China) Zh Zhang	6	1	6^{5}
(Russia) R Safiullin	3	6	7^{7}
WC	(Thailand) W Trongcharoenchaikul	3	6	6
11	(Italy) R Marcora	6	3	4
13	(Canada) P Polansky	6	7
(Japan) S Sekiguchi	3	5
(France) H Grenier	6	3	6
4	(France) A Hoang	0	6	1

Third round
(Russia) R Safiullin	6	6
WC	(Thailand) W Trongcharoenchaikul	4	4
13	(Canada) P Polansky	6	4	6^{4}
(France) H Grenier	3	6	7^{7}

Quarterfinals
(Russia) R Safiullin	6	4	3
(France) H Grenier	2	6	6

==== Section 4 ====
First round
Alt	(Canada) F Peliwo	5	4
(Italy) F Baldi	7	6
Q	(Bosnia and Herzegovina) M Bašić	3	1
(Argentina) R Olivo	6	6
(Croatia) B Gojo	6^{4}	2
(United States) JC Aragone	7^{7}	6
(Ukraine) I Marchenko	6	5	4
Alt	(Slovakia) A Molčan	2	7	6

Second round
5	(Hungary) A Balázs	6	3	6
(Italy) F Baldi	1	6	4
(Argentina) R Olivo	3	3
10	(Netherlands) R Haase	6	6
15	(India) R Ramanathan	7^{7}	1
(United States) JC Aragone	6^{5}	0^{r}
Alt	(Slovakia) A Molčan	6	6^{4}	2
2	(Japan) G Soeda	0	7^{7}	6

Third round
5	(Hungary) A Balázs	4	1^{r}
10	(Netherlands) R Haase	6	2
15	(India) R Ramanathan	7	7
2	(Japan) G Soeda	5	5

Quarterfinals
10	(Netherlands) R Haase	7^{7}	6
15	(India) R Ramanathan	6^{5}	2
