= 2018 Bangkok Challenger II =

- Date: 8–13 January
- Edition: 3rd
- Draw: 32S / 16D
- Surface: Hard
- Location: Bangkok, Thailand

Champions

Singles
- (Spain) Marcel Granollers

Doubles
- (United States) James Cerretani / (United Kingdom) Joe Salisbury
← 2017 ·	Bangkok Challenger II	· 2019 →

The 2018 Bangkok Challenger II was a professional tennis tournament played on hard courts. It was third edition of the tournament and part of the 2018 ATP Challenger Tour. It took place in Bangkok, Thailand between 8 and 13 January 2018.

== Singles main-draw entrants ==
=== Seeds ===
Country	Player	Rank^{1}	Seed
ESP	Marcel Granollers	177	1
ESP	Enrique López Pérez	256	2
ESP	Pedro Martínez	261	3
TPE	Yang Tsung-hua	265	4
RUS	Ivan Nedelko	273	5
GER	Mats Moraing	274	6
JPN	Yusuke Takahashi	282	7
ITA	Matteo Viola	285	8

- ^{1} Rankings are as of 1 January 2018.

=== Other entrants ===
The following players received wildcards into the singles main draw:

- (Thailand) Thanapet Chanta
- (Thailand) Congsup Congcar
- (Thailand) Pruchya Isaro
- (Thailand) Pol Wattanakul

The following player received entry into the singles main draw using a protected ranking:

- (Italy) Flavio Cipolla

The following players received entry from the qualifying draw:

- (Japan) Yuya Kibi
- (Denmark) Frederik Nielsen
- (India) Sidharth Rawat
- (Finland) Emil Ruusuvuori

== Champions ==
=== Singles ===
- (Spain) Marcel Granollers def. (Spain) Enrique López Pérez 4–6, 6–2, 6–0.

=== Doubles ===
- (United States) James Cerretani / (United Kingdom) Joe Salisbury def. (Spain) Enrique López Pérez / (Spain) Pedro Martínez 6–7^{(5–7)}, 6–3, [10–8].
