= 2016 Wind Energy Holding Bangkok Open – Doubles =

Doubles
- 2016 Wind Energy Holding Bangkok Open

Final
- Champions: (Thailand) Wishaya Trongcharoenchaikul (Thailand) Kittipong Wachiramanowong
- Runners-up: (Thailand) Sanchai Ratiwatana (Thailand) Sonchat Ratiwatana
- Score: 7–6^{(11–9)}, 6–3

Events
Singles	Doubles
Wind Energy Holding Bangkok Open

This was the first edition of the tournament.

Wishaya Trongcharoenchaikul and Kittipong Wachiramanowong won the title after defeating Sanchai and Sonchat Ratiwatana 7–6^{(11–9)}, 6–3 in the final.

== Seeds ==
1. (Thailand) Sanchai Ratiwatana / (Thailand) Sonchat Ratiwatana (final)
2. (Belarus) Sergey Betov / (Ukraine) Denys Molchanov (semifinals)
3. (Chinese Taipei) Hsieh Cheng-peng / (Chinese Taipei) Yi Chu-huan (first round)
4. (India) Jeevan Nedunchezhiyan / (India) Sanam Singh (first round)

== Draw ==
=== Key ===
- Q = Qualifier
- WC = Wild card
- LL = Lucky loser
- Alt = Alternate
- SE = Special exempt
- PR = Protected ranking
- ITF = ITF entry
- JE = Junior exempt
- w/o = Walkover
- r = Retired
- d = Defaulted
- SR = Special ranking

First round
1	(Thailand) Sa Ratiwatana (Thailand) So Ratiwatana	6	6
WC	(Thailand) Natthasith Kunsuwan (Thailand) Chaleechan Tanasugarn	2	1
WC	(Thailand) Phassawit Burapharitta (Thailand) J Navasirisomboon	2	2
(Chinese Taipei) T Chen (United States) JP Fruttero	6	6
4	(India) J Nedunchezhiyan (India) S Singh	6^{4}	7^{7}	[10]
(South Africa) L Harris (Israel) A Weintraub	7^{7}	6^{4}	[12]
(Turkey) C İlkel (Germany) Marc Sieber	4	4
(Japan) Shuichi Sekiguchi (Japan) Y Uchiyama	6	6
(China) X Gao (China) Z Li	2	4
(Australia) M Matosevic (Australia) B Mousley	6	6
WC	(Thailand) W Trongcharoenchaikul (Thailand) K Wachiramanowong	7	6
3	(Chinese Taipei) C-p Hsieh (Chinese Taipei) C-h Yi	5	3
(Australia) Jarryd Chaplin (New Zealand) B McLachlan	3	6	[7]
(Japan) Yuya Kibi (Japan) T Matsui	6	1	[10]
(Israel) E Leshem (Australia) B Mott	3	1
2	(Belarus) S Betov (Ukraine) D Molchanov	6	6

Quarterfinals
1	(Thailand) Sa Ratiwatana (Thailand) So Ratiwatana	6	7
(Chinese Taipei) T Chen (United States) JP Fruttero	3	5
(South Africa) L Harris (Israel) A Weintraub	6	3	[10]
(Japan) S Sekiguchi (Japan) Y Uchiyama	3	6	[6]
(Australia) M Matosevic (Australia) B Mousley	5	6	[8]
WC	(Thailand) W Trongcharoenchaikul (Thailand) K Wachiramanowong	7	0	[10]
(Japan) Y Kibi (Japan) T Matsui	6^{4}	3
2	(Belarus) S Betov (Ukraine) D Molchanov	7^{7}	6

Semifinals
1	(Thailand) Sa Ratiwatana (Thailand) So Ratiwatana	3	6	[10]
(South Africa) L Harris (Israel) A Weintraub	6	3	[7]
WC	(Thailand) W Trongcharoenchaikul (Thailand) K Wachiramanowong	7^{8}	3	[10]
2	(Belarus) S Betov (Ukraine) D Molchanov	6^{6}	6	[6]

Final
1	(Thailand) Sa Ratiwatana (Thailand) So Ratiwatana	6^{9}	3
WC	(Thailand) W Trongcharoenchaikul (Thailand) K Wachiramanowong	7^{11}	6
