= 2020 Bangkok Challenger II – Doubles =

Doubles
- 2020 Bangkok Challenger II

Final
- Champions: (Ecuador) Gonzalo Escobar (Mexico) Miguel Ángel Reyes-Varela
- Runners-up: (China) Gong Maoxin (China) Zhang Ze
- Score: 6–3, 6–3

Events
| Singles | Doubles |
- Bangkok Challenger II

Li Zhe and Gonçalo Oliveira were the defending champions but only Oliveira chose to defend his title, partnering Yang Tsung-hua. Oliveira lost in the first round to Andrey Golubev and Aleksandr Nedovyesov.

Gonzalo Escobar and Miguel Ángel Reyes-Varela won the title after defeating Gong Maoxin and Zhang Ze 6–3, 6–3 in the final.

== Seeds ==
1. (Netherlands) Robin Haase / (Netherlands) David Pel (quarterfinals)
2. (Ecuador) Gonzalo Escobar / (Mexico) Miguel Ángel Reyes-Varela (champions)
3. (Monaco) Romain Arneodo / (Germany) Andre Begemann (first round)
4. (Bosnia and Herzegovina) Tomislav Brkić / (Croatia) Ante Pavić (quarterfinals)

== Draw ==
Key

- Q = Qualifier
- WC = Wild card
- LL = Lucky loser
- Alt = Alternate
- ITF = ITF entry
- PR = Protected ranking
- SR = Special ranking
- SE = Special exempt
- JE = Junior exempt
- JR = Junior Accelerator Programme entrant
- CO = College Accelerator Programme entrant
- NG = Next Gen Accelerator Program entrant
- w/o = Walkover
- r = Retired
- d = Defaulted

First round
1 | (Netherlands) R Haase (Netherlands) D Pel | 6 | 6
WC | (Thailand) P Kovapitukted (Thailand) K Samrej | 4 | 4
WC | (Kazakhstan) A Golubev (Kazakhstan) A Nedovyesov | 6 | 7
(Portugal) G Oliveira (Chinese Taipei) T-h Yang | 4 | 5
3 | (Monaco) R Arneodo (Germany) A Begemann | 3 | 3
(Philippines) T Huey (United States) N Lammons | 6 | 6
(China) M Gong (China) Ze Zhang | 6 | 5 | [10]
(Tunisia) M Jaziri (Venezuela) LD Martínez | 4 | 7 | [7]
(United States) E King (United States) H Reese | 2 | 4
(Thailand) Sa Ratiwatana (Indonesia) C Rungkat | 6 | 6
(Italy) F Gaio (Italy) P Lorenzi | 4 | 4
4 | (Bosnia and Herzegovina) T Brkić (Croatia) A Pavić | 6 | 6
(France) S Doumbia (France) F Reboul | 4 | 5
(India) S Balaji (India) J Nedunchezhiyan | 6 | 7
WC | (Thailand) So Ratiwatana (Thailand) W Trongcharoenchaikul | 2 | 4
2 | (Ecuador) G Escobar (Mexico) MÁ Reyes-Varela | 6 | 6

Quarterfinals
1 | (Netherlands) R Haase (Netherlands) D Pel | 7^{7} | 5 | [7]
WC | (Kazakhstan) A Golubev (Kazakhstan) A Nedovyesov | 6^{4} | 7 | [10]
(Philippines) T Huey (United States) N Lammons | 4 | 6 | [9]
(China) M Gong (China) Ze Zhang | 6 | 2 | [11]
(Thailand) Sa Ratiwatana (Indonesia) C Rungkat | 7^{7} | 7^{7}
4 | (Bosnia and Herzegovina) T Brkić (Croatia) A Pavić | 6^{2} | 6^{3}
(India) S Balaji (India) J Nedunchezhiyan | 6^{4} | 3
2 | (Ecuador) G Escobar (Mexico) MÁ Reyes-Varela | 7^{7} | 6

Semifinals
WC | (Kazakhstan) A Golubev (Kazakhstan) A Nedovyesov | 3 | 7 | [2]
(China) M Gong (China) Ze Zhang | 6 | 5 | [10]
(Thailand) Sa Ratiwatana (Indonesia) C Rungkat | 4 | 6^{5}
2 | (Ecuador) G Escobar (Mexico) MÁ Reyes-Varela | 6 | 7^{7}

Final
(China) M Gong (China) Ze Zhang | 3 | 3
2 | (Ecuador) G Escobar (Mexico) MÁ Reyes-Varela | 6 | 6
