= 2017 Bangkok Challenger II – Doubles =

Doubles
- 2017 Bangkok Challenger II

Final
- Champions: (Thailand) Sanchai Ratiwatana (Thailand) Sonchat Ratiwatana
- Runners-up: (France) Sadio Doumbia (France) Fabien Reboul
- Score: 7–6^{(7–4)}, 7–5

Events
Singles	Doubles
← 2016 ·	Bangkok Challenger II	· 2018 →

Wesley Koolhof and Matwé Middelkoop were the defending champions but chose not to participate.

Sanchai and Sonchat Ratiwatana won the title after defeating Sadio Doumbia and Fabien Reboul 7–6^{(7–4)}, 7–5 in the final.

== Seeds ==
1. (United Kingdom) Jonathan Marray / (Canada) Adil Shamasdin (first round)
2. (Thailand) Sanchai Ratiwatana / (Thailand) Sonchat Ratiwatana (champions)
3. (Germany) Kevin Krawietz / (France) Albano Olivetti (semifinals)
4. (Chinese Taipei) Chen Ti / (Chinese Taipei) Yi Chu-huan (semifinals)

== Draw ==
=== Key ===
- Q = Qualifier
- WC = Wild card
- LL = Lucky loser
- Alt = Alternate
- SE = Special exempt
- PR = Protected ranking
- ITF = ITF entry
- JE = Junior exempt
- w/o = Walkover
- r = Retired
- d = Defaulted
- SR = Special ranking

First round
1	(United Kingdom) J Marray (Canada) A Shamasdin	2	6^{2}
(Germany) N Langer (Germany) Y Maden	6	7^{7}
(France) G Barrère (Croatia) N Mektić	6	5	[8]
(France) S Doumbia (France) F Reboul	2	7	[10]
3	(Germany) K Krawietz (France) A Olivetti	7	5	[10]
(United States) JP Fruttero (Chinese Taipei) H-y Peng	5	7	[6]
(Belarus) E Gerasimov (Russia) A Karatsev	6	6^{0}	[10]
(India) S Balaji (China) Z Li	4	7^{7}	[3]
(Italy) A Bega (Belgium) Y Mertens	7	6
WC	(Thailand) Congsup Congcar (Thailand) Chayanon Kaewsuto	5	2
(Belgium) G Gigounon (France) A Michon	7	2	[7]
4	(Chinese Taipei) T Chen (Chinese Taipei) C-h Yi	5	6	[10]
(Czech Republic) V Šafránek (Portugal) F Ferreira Silva	6	6
WC	(Thailand) Chanon Phunsawat (Thailand) W Sornbutnark	4	0
WC	(Thailand) Patcharapol Kawin (Thailand) Werapath Sirijatiyaporn	3	4
2	(Thailand) Sa Ratiwatana (Thailand) So Ratiwatana	6	6

Quarterfinals
(Germany) N Langer (Germany) Y Maden	1	1
(France) S Doumbia (France) F Reboul	6	6
3	(Germany) K Krawietz (France) A Olivetti	6^{3}	6	[10]
(Belarus) E Gerasimov (Russia) A Karatsev	7^{7}	3	[6]
(Italy) A Bega (Belgium) Y Mertens	3	3
4	(Chinese Taipei) T Chen (Chinese Taipei) C-h Yi	6	6
(Czech Republic) V Šafránek (Portugal) F Ferreira Silva	2	4
2	(Thailand) Sa Ratiwatana (Thailand) So Ratiwatana	6	6

Semifinals
(France) S Doumbia (France) F Reboul	4	6	[10]
3	(Germany) K Krawietz (France) A Olivetti	6	1	[6]
4	(Chinese Taipei) T Chen (Chinese Taipei) C-h Yi	6	5	[1]
2	(Thailand) Sa Ratiwatana (Thailand) So Ratiwatana	3	7	[10]

Final
(France) S Doumbia (France) F Reboul	6^{4}	5
2	(Thailand) Sa Ratiwatana (Thailand) So Ratiwatana	7^{7}	7
