= 2019 Bangkok Challenger II =

- Date: 18–24 February
- Draw: 48S / 16D
- Surface: Hard
- Location: Bangkok, Thailand

Champions

Singles
- (Australia) James Duckworth

Doubles
- (China) Li Zhe / (Portugal) Gonçalo Oliveira
- Bangkok Challenger II

The 2019 Bangkok Challenger II was a professional tennis tournament played on hard courts. It was part of the 2019 ATP Challenger Tour. It took place in Bangkok, Thailand between 18 and 24 February 2019.

== Singles main-draw entrants ==
=== Seeds ===
Country	Player	Rank^{1}	Seed
IND	Prajnesh Gunneswaran	97	1
JPN	Tatsuma Ito	141	2
SUI	Henri Laaksonen	146	3
JPN	Yūichi Sugita	163	4
JPN	Hiroki Moriya	177	5
KAZ	Aleksandr Nedovyesov	188	6
GER	Tobias Kamke	205	7
CHN	Zhang Ze	208	8
JPN	Go Soeda	212	9
ITA	Gianluca Mager	215	10
AUS	Marc Polmans	216	11
SRB	Viktor Troicki	221	12
ISR	Dudi Sela	223	13
ESP	Alejandro Davidovich Fokina	225	14
AUS	James Duckworth	231	15
KOR	Kwon Soon-woo	235	16

- ^{1} Rankings are as of 11 February 2019.

=== Other entrants ===
The following players received wildcards into the singles main draw:

- (Thailand) Thanapet Chanta
- (Thailand) Pruchya Isaro
- (Thailand) Palaphoom Kovapitukted
- ~~(Serbia) Janko Tipsarević~~
- (Thailand) Wishaya Trongcharoenchaikul

The following players received entry into the singles main draw using their ITF World Tennis Ranking:

- (Bulgaria) Dimitar Kuzmanov
- (Spain) David Pérez Sanz
- (Spain) Oriol Roca Batalla
- (Kazakhstan) Denis Yevseyev

The following players received entry from the qualifying draw:

- (China) Bai Yan
- (Russia) Ivan Gakhov

The following player received entry as a lucky loser:

- (Tunisia) Moez Echargui

== Champions ==
=== Singles ===
- (Australia) James Duckworth def. (Spain) Alejandro Davidovich Fokina 6–4, 6–3.

=== Doubles ===
- (China) Li Zhe / (Portugal) Gonçalo Oliveira def. (Spain) Enrique López Pérez / (Japan) Hiroki Moriya 6–2, 6–1.
