= 2016 ATP Challenger Torino – Doubles =

Doubles
- 2016 ATP Challenger Torino

Final
- Champion: (Slovakia) Andrej Martin (Chile) Hans Podlipnik
- Runner-up: (Australia) Rameez Junaid (Poland) Mateusz Kowalczyk
- Score: 4–6, 7–6^{(7–3)}, [12–10]

Events
Singles	Doubles
← 2015 ·	ATP Challenger Torino	· 2017 →

Wesley Koolhof and Matwé Middelkoop were the defending champions but chose not to participate.

Andrej Martin and Hans Podlipnik won the title, defeating Rameez Junaid and Mateusz Kowalczyk 4–6, 7–6^{(7–3)}, [12–10] in the final.

== Seeds ==
1. (Slovakia) Andrej Martin / (Chile) Hans Podlipnik (champions)
2. (United Kingdom) Ken Skupski / (United Kingdom) Neal Skupski (semifinals)
3. (Australia) Rameez Junaid / (Poland) Mateusz Kowalczyk (final)
4. (Croatia) Nikola Mektić / (Croatia) Antonio Šančić (semifinals)

== Draw ==
=== Key ===
- Q = Qualifier
- WC = Wild card
- LL = Lucky loser
- Alt = Alternate
- SE = Special exempt
- PR = Protected ranking
- ITF = ITF entry
- JE = Junior exempt
- w/o = Walkover
- r = Retired
- d = Defaulted
- SR = Special ranking

First round
1	(Slovakia) A Martin (Chile) H Podlipnik	5	6	[10]
(Czech Republic) R Jebavý (Czech Republic) J Šátral	7	3	[7]
(Croatia) D Marcan (Slovenia) B Rola	6	6
(Argentina) A Molteni (Mexico) MÁ Reyes-Varela	1	2
4	(Croatia) N Mektić (Croatia) A Šančić	7	6
(Italy) F Cipolla (Brazil) R Dutra Silva	5	3
WC	(Italy) Omar Giacalone (Italy) Edoardo Lavagno	2	6^{2}
(Austria) T-S Weissborn (Estonia) J Zopp	6	7^{7}
(Italy) A Motti (France) S Robert	6	6
WC	(Italy) Alberto Bagarello (Italy) Ettore Capello	2	2
(Russia) A Karatsev (Germany) F Moser	6^{7}	6	[4]
3	(Australia) R Junaid (Poland) M Kowalczyk	7^{9}	3	[10]
(Belgium) Y Mertens (Netherlands) M Vervoort	3	4
WC	(Italy) Edoardo Eremin (Italy) L Sonego	6	6
(Poland) T Bednarek (Austria) P Oswald	7	4	[8]
2	(United Kingdom) K Skupski (United Kingdom) N Skupski	5	6	[10]

Quarterfinals
1	(Slovakia) A Martin (Chile) H Podlipnik	6	6
(Croatia) D Marcan (Slovenia) B Rola	3	3
4	(Croatia) N Mektić (Croatia) A Šančić	6	6
(Austria) T-S Weissborn (Estonia) J Zopp	3	2
(Italy) A Motti (France) S Robert	5	5
3	(Australia) R Junaid (Poland) M Kowalczyk	7	7
WC	(Italy) E Eremin (Italy) L Sonego	1	7^{7}	[9]
2	(United Kingdom) K Skupski (United Kingdom) N Skupski	6	6^{2}	[11]

Semifinals
1	(Slovakia) A Martin (Chile) H Podlipnik	6	1	[10]
4	(Croatia) N Mektić (Croatia) A Šančić	4	6	[6]
3	(Australia) R Junaid (Poland) M Kowalczyk	1	6	[12]
2	(United Kingdom) K Skupski (United Kingdom) N Skupski	6	1	[10]

Final
1	(Slovakia) A Martin (Chile) H Podlipnik	4	7^{7}	[12]
3	(Australia) R Junaid (Poland) M Kowalczyk	6	6^{3}	[10]
