= 2020 Bangkok Challenger II =

- Date: 20–26 January
- Draw: 48S / 16D
- Surface: Hard
- Location: Bangkok, Thailand

Champions

Singles
- (Italy) Federico Gaio

Doubles
- (Ecuador) Gonzalo Escobar / (Mexico) Miguel Ángel Reyes-Varela
- Bangkok Challenger II

The 2020 Bangkok Challenger II was a professional tennis tournament played on hard courts. It was part of the 2020 ATP Challenger Tour. It took place in Bangkok, Thailand between 20 and 26 January 2020.

== Singles main-draw entrants ==
=== Seeds ===
Country	Player	Rank^{1}	Seed
CZE	Jiří Veselý	108	1
JPN	Go Soeda	110	2
ITA	Paolo Lorenzi	114	3
FRA	Antoine Hoang	117	4
HUN	Attila Balázs	128	5
CHN	Zhang Zhizhen	137	6
SVK	Martin Kližan	142	7
ITA	Federico Gaio	150	8
AUT	Sebastian Ofner	156	9
NED	Robin Haase	161	10
ITA	Roberto Marcora	171	11
UZB	Denis Istomin	174	12
CAN	Peter Polansky	180	13
KAZ	Dmitry Popko	184	14
IND	Ramkumar Ramanathan	185	15
NED	Botic van de Zandschulp	193	16

- ^{1} Rankings are as of 13 January 2020.

=== Other entrants ===
The following players received wildcards into the singles main draw:

- (Thailand) Thanapet Chanta
- (Thailand) Palaphoom Kovapitukted
- (Thailand) Michael Mathayomchand
- (Thailand) Kasidit Samrej
- (Thailand) Wishaya Trongcharoenchaikul

The following player received entry into the singles main draw using a protected ranking:

- (Belgium) Arthur De Greef

The following players received entry into the singles main draw as alternates:

- (Slovakia) Alex Molčan
- (Canada) Filip Peliwo
- (Japan) Kaichi Uchida

The following players received entry from the qualifying draw:

- (Bosnia and Herzegovina) Mirza Bašić
- (Russia) Aslan Karatsev

== Champions ==
=== Singles ===
- (Italy) Federico Gaio def. (Netherlands) Robin Haase 6–1, 4–6, 4–2 ret.

=== Doubles ===
- (Ecuador) Gonzalo Escobar / (Mexico) Miguel Ángel Reyes-Varela def. (China) Gong Maoxin / (China) Zhang Ze 6–3, 6–3.
