= 2015 ATP Challenger Torino =

- Date: 27 April – 3 May
- Edition: 1st
- Draw: 32S / 16D
- Prize money: €42,500+H
- Surface: Red clay
- Location: Turin, Italy

Champions

Singles
- (Italy) Marco Cecchinato

Doubles
- (Netherlands) Wesley Koolhof / (Netherlands) Matwé Middelkoop
ATP Challenger Torino	· 2016 →

The 2015 ATP Challenger Torino was a professional tennis tournament played on clay courts. It was the first edition of the tournament which was part of the 2015 ATP Challenger Tour. It took place in Turin, Italy between 27 April and 3 May.

== Singles main-draw entrants ==
=== Seeds ===
Country	Player	Rank^{1}	Seed
TUN	Malek Jaziri	89	1
GBR	Aljaž Bedene	94	2
GER	Tobias Kamke	114	3
BEL	Kimmer Coppejans	125	4
FRA	Édouard Roger-Vasselin	127	5
NED	Igor Sijsling	129	6
GBR	Kyle Edmund	130	7
ITA	Marco Cecchinato	150	8

- ^{1} Rankings are as of April 20, 2015

=== Other entrants ===
The following players received wildcards into the singles main draw:

- (Italy) Matteo Donati
- (Italy) Stefano Napolitano
- (Italy) Gianluigi Quinzi
- (Italy) Lorenzo Sonego

The following players received entry from the qualifying draw:

- (Russia) Karen Khachanov
- (France) Maxime Hamou
- (Italy) Gianluca Naso
- (Italy) Edoardo Eremin

== Champions ==
=== Singles ===
- (Italy) Marco Cecchinato def. (Belgium) Kimmer Coppejans, 6–2, 6–3

=== Doubles ===
- (Netherlands) Wesley Koolhof / (Netherlands) Matwé Middelkoop def. (Croatia) Dino Marcan / (Croatia) Antonio Šančić, 4–6, 6–3, [10–5]
