= 2015 ATP Challenger Torino – Singles =

Singles
- 2015 ATP Challenger Torino

Final
- Champion: (Italy) Marco Cecchinato
- Runner-up: (Belgium) Kimmer Coppejans
- Score: 6–2, 6–3

Events
| Singles | Doubles |
| ATP Challenger Torino | · 2016 → |

This was the first edition of the tournament.

Marco Cecchinato won the title, defeating Kimmer Coppejans in the final, 6–2, 6–3.

== Seeds ==
1. (Tunisia) Malek Jaziri (second round)
2. (United Kingdom) Aljaž Bedene (second round)
3. (Germany) Tobias Kamke (first round)
4. (Belgium) Kimmer Coppejans (final)
5. (France) Édouard Roger-Vasselin (first round)
6. (Netherlands) Igor Sijsling (first round)
7. (United Kingdom) Kyle Edmund (quarterfinals)
8. (Italy) Marco Cecchinato (champion)

== Draw ==
=== Key ===
- Q = Qualifier
- WC = Wild card
- LL = Lucky loser
- Alt = Alternate
- ITF = ITF entry
- PR = Protected ranking
- SR = Special ranking
- SE = Special exempt
- JE = Junior exempt
- JR = Junior Accelerator Programme entrant
- CO = College Accelerator Programme entrant
- NG = Next Gen Accelerator Program entrant
- w/o = Walkover
- r = Retired
- d = Defaulted

=== Finals ===
Semifinals
8 | (Italy) Marco Cecchinato | 6 | 6
Q | (France) Maxime Hamou | 2 | 1
4 | (Belgium) Kimmer Coppejans | 6 | 2 | 7^{7}
(Romania) Adrian Ungur | 3 | 6 | 6^{5}

Final
8 | (Italy) Marco Cecchinato | 6 | 6
4 | (Belgium) Kimmer Coppejans | 2 | 3

=== Top half ===
First round
1 | (Tunisia) M Jaziri | 6 | 2
(Italy) F Volandri | 1 | 0^{r}
WC | (Italy) M Donati | 4 | 3
(Netherlands) J Huta Galung | 6 | 6
(France) D Guez | 6 | 3 | 4
WC | (Italy) S Napolitano | 2 | 6 | 6
(Spain) O Roca Batalla | 6 | 2 | 1
8 | (Italy) M Cecchinato | 4 | 6 | 6
3 | (Germany) T Kamke | 2 | 7^{7} | 1
Q | (Russia) K Khachanov | 6 | 6^{5} | 6
Q | (Italy) Edoardo Eremin | 7^{8} | 4 | 4
Q | (France) M Hamou | 6^{6} | 6 | 6
(Russia) A Karatsev | 7^{7} | 6
(Italy) A Arnaboldi | 6^{5} | 0
(Bosnia and Herzegovina) T Brkić | 6 | 7
6 | (Netherlands) I Sijsling | 4 | 5

Second round
1 | (Tunisia) M Jaziri | 2 | 5
(Netherlands) J Huta Galung | 6 | 7
WC | (Italy) S Napolitano | 2 | 7^{7} | 2
8 | (Italy) M Cecchinato | 6 | 6^{5} | 6
Q | (Russia) K Khachanov | 1 | 4
Q | (France) M Hamou | 6 | 6
(Russia) A Karatsev | 2 | 6 | 6
(Bosnia and Herzegovina) T Brkić | 6 | 1 | 3

Quarterfinals
(Netherlands) J Huta Galung | 3 | 4
8 | (Italy) M Cecchinato | 6 | 6
Q | (France) M Hamou | 6 | 7^{7}
(Russia) A Karatsev | 3 | 6^{3}

Semifinals
8 | (Italy) M Cecchinato | 6 | 6
Q | (France) M Hamou | 2 | 1

=== Bottom half ===
First round
7 | (United Kingdom) K Edmund | 6 | 6
(France) T Lamasine | 4 | 2
(Serbia) P Krstin | 7 | 6
WC | (Italy) G Quinzi | 5 | 2
WC | (Italy) L Sonego | 6 | 6
(Switzerland) H Laaksonen | 4 | 3
(Sweden) E Ymer | 6 | 0 | 3
4 | (Belgium) K Coppejans | 3 | 6 | 6
5 | (France) E Roger-Vasselin | 7^{7} | 2 | 4
(Argentina) M Trungelliti | 6^{4} | 6 | 6
(Italy) M Viola | 2 | 3
(Romania) A Ungur | 6 | 6
(Bosnia and Herzegovina) M Bašić | 7^{7} | 3 | 4
Q | (Italy) G Naso | 6^{5} | 6 | 6
(Croatia) A Veić | 1 | 4
2 | (United Kingdom) A Bedene | 6 | 6

Second round
7 | (United Kingdom) K Edmund | 6 | 2 | 6
(Serbia) P Krstin | 1 | 6 | 4
WC | (Italy) L Sonego | 7^{7} | 2 | 4
4 | (Belgium) K Coppejans | 6^{5} | 6 | 6
(Argentina) M Trungelliti | 2 | 2
(Romania) A Ungur | 6 | 6
Q | (Italy) G Naso | 7^{8} | 6
2 | (United Kingdom) A Bedene | 6^{6} | 4

Quarterfinals
7 | (United Kingdom) K Edmund | 7^{7} | 3 | 0
4 | (Belgium) K Coppejans | 6^{5} | 6 | 6
(Romania) A Ungur | 6 | 6
Q | (Italy) G Naso | 3 | 3

Semifinals
4 | (Belgium) K Coppejans | 6 | 2 | 7^{7}
(Romania) A Ungur | 3 | 6 | 6^{5}
