= 2016 KPN Bangkok Open II =

- Date: 11–17 January
- Edition: 1st
- Draw: 32S / 16D
- Prize money: $50,000
- Surface: Hard
- Location: Bangkok, Thailand

Champions

Singles
- (Russia) Mikhail Youzhny

Doubles
- (Netherlands) Wesley Koolhof / (Netherlands) Matwé Middelkoop
KPN Bangkok Open II	· 2017 →

The 2016 KPN Bangkok Open II was a professional tennis tournament played on hard courts. It was the first edition of the tournament which was part of the 2016 ATP Challenger Tour. It took place in Bangkok, Thailand between 11 and 17 January 2016.

== Singles main-draw entrants ==
=== Seeds ===
Country	Player	Rank^{1}	Seed
RUS	Mikhail Youzhny	127	1
CZE	Adam Pavlásek	160	2
TPE	Jason Jung	256	3
FRA	Yannick Jankovits	274	4
POL	Kamil Majchrzak	275	5
IND	Sanam Singh	278	6
ITA	Matteo Viola	288	7
FRA	Maxime Teixeira	290	8

- ^{1} Rankings are as of January 4, 2016.

=== Other entrants ===
The following players received wildcards into the singles main draw:

- (Thailand) Nattan Benjasupawan
- (Thailand) Sonchat Ratiwatana
- (Thailand) Wishaya Trongcharoenchaikul
- (Thailand) Kittipong Wachiramanowong

The following player received protected ranking entry into the singles main draw:

- (Russia) Roman Safiullin

The following players received entry from the qualifying draw:

- (South Korea) Cheong-Eui Kim
- (United Kingdom) Joshua Milton
- (Austria) Maximilian Neuchrist
- (Denmark) Frederik Nielsen

The following player received entry as a lucky loser:

- (Monaco) Benjamin Balleret

== Champions ==
=== Singles ===
- (Russia) Mikhail Youzhny def. (Czech Republic) Adam Pavlásek 6–4, 6–1

=== Doubles ===
- (Netherlands) Wesley Koolhof / (Netherlands) Matwé Middelkoop def. (Germany) Gero Kretschmer / (Germany) Alexander Satschko 6–3, 7–6^{(7–1)}
