= 2015 ATP Challenger Torino – Doubles =

Doubles
- 2015 ATP Challenger Torino

Final
- Champions: (Netherlands) Wesley Koolhof (Netherlands) Matwé Middelkoop
- Runners-up: (Croatia) Dino Marcan (Croatia) Antonio Šančić
- Score: 4–6, 6–3, [10–5]

Events
Singles	Doubles
ATP Challenger Torino	· 2016 →

This was the first edition of the tournament.

Wesley Koolhof and Matwé Middelkoop won the title, defeating Dino Marcan and Antonio Šančić in the final, 4–6, 6–3, [10–5].

== Seeds ==
1. (Netherlands) Wesley Koolhof / (Netherlands) Matwé Middelkoop (champions)
2. (Italy) Alessandro Motti / (United Kingdom) Sean Thornley (first round)
3. (Romania) Patrick Grigoriu / (Romania) Costin Pavăl (quarterfinals)
4. (Croatia) Dino Marcan / (Croatia) Antonio Šančić (final)

== Draw ==
=== Key ===
- Q = Qualifier
- WC = Wild card
- LL = Lucky loser
- Alt = Alternate
- SE = Special exempt
- PR = Protected ranking
- ITF = ITF entry
- JE = Junior exempt
- w/o = Walkover
- r = Retired
- d = Defaulted
- SR = Special ranking

First round
1	(Netherlands) W Koolhof (Netherlands) M Middelkoop	6	6
WC	(Italy) Francesco Borgo (Italy) G Naso	1	4
(Italy) M Cecchinato (Italy) Pietro Rondoni	4	2
(Italy) D Giorgini (Romania) A Ungur	6	6
3	(Romania) P Grigoriu (Romania) C Pavăl	7	7
(United Kingdom) A Bedene (United Kingdom) D Rice	5	5
(Bosnia and Herzegovina) M Bašić (Bosnia and Herzegovina) T Brkić	1	3
(Serbia) I Bozoljac (Tunisia) M Jaziri	6	6
(Russia) K Khachanov (Sweden) E Ymer	6	2	[6]
(Spain) O Roca Batalla (Argentina) M Trungelliti	3	6	[10]
WC	(Italy) M Donati (Italy) S Napolitano	3	6	[5]
4	(Croatia) D Marcan (Croatia) A Šančić	6	4	[10]
(Belgium) K Coppejans (France) T Lamasine	5	6^{5}
WC	(Italy) Edoardo Eremin (Italy) L Sonego	7	7^{7}
(Italy) A Arnaboldi (Italy) M Viola	6	6
2	(Italy) A Motti (United Kingdom) S Thornley	3	2

Quarterfinals
1	(Netherlands) W Koolhof (Netherlands) M Middelkoop	7^{8}	6
(Italy) D Giorgini (Romania) A Ungur	6^{6}	3
3	(Romania) P Grigoriu (Romania) C Pavăl	7	6^{3}	8
(Serbia) I Bozoljac (Tunisia) M Jaziri	5	7^{7}	[10]
(Spain) O Roca Batalla (Argentina) M Trungelliti	1	6^{5}
4	(Croatia) D Marcan (Croatia) A Šančić	6	7^{7}
WC	(Italy) E Eremin (Italy) L Sonego	6	1	[8]
(Italy) A Arnaboldi (Italy) M Viola	3	6	[10]

Semifinals
1	(Netherlands) W Koolhof (Netherlands) M Middelkoop	6	6
(Serbia) I Bozoljac (Tunisia) M Jaziri	1	2
4	(Croatia) D Marcan (Croatia) A Šančić	7^{7}	6
(Italy) A Arnaboldi (Italy) M Viola	6^{2}	2

Final
1	(Netherlands) W Koolhof (Netherlands) M Middelkoop	4	6	[10]
4	(Croatia) D Marcan (Croatia) A Šančić	6	3	[5]
