= 2016 ATP Challenger Torino – Singles =

Singles
- 2016 ATP Challenger Torino

Final
- Champion: (Portugal) Gastão Elias
- Runner-up: (Spain) Enrique López-Pérez
- Score: 3–6, 6–4, 6–2

Events
Singles	Doubles
← 2015 ·	ATP Challenger Torino	· 2017 →

Marco Cecchinato was the defending champion but chose not to participate.

Gastão Elias won the title, defeating Enrique López-Pérez 3–6, 6–4, 6–2 in the final.

== Seeds ==
1. (Brazil) Rogério Dutra Silva (first round)
2. (Italy) Thomas Fabbiano (first round)
3. (Portugal) Gastão Elias (champion)
4. (France) Stéphane Robert (second round)
5. (Slovakia) Andrej Martin (first round)
6. (Netherlands) Igor Sijsling (first round)
7. (Italy) Luca Vanni (first round)
8. (Belgium) Kimmer Coppejans (quarterfinals)

== Draw ==
=== Key ===
- Q = Qualifier
- WC = Wild card
- LL = Lucky loser
- Alt = Alternate
- ITF = ITF entry
- PR = Protected ranking
- SR = Special ranking
- SE = Special exempt
- JE = Junior exempt
- JR = Junior Accelerator Programme entrant
- CO = College Accelerator Programme entrant
- NG = Next Gen Accelerator Program entrant
- w/o = Walkover
- r = Retired
- d = Defaulted

=== Finals ===
Semifinals
SE	(Spain) Enrique López-Pérez	7^{7}	6
(Italy) Filippo Volandri	6^{5}	4
3	(Portugal) Gastão Elias	6	6
(Serbia) Laslo Djere	3	2

Final
SE	(Spain) Enrique López-Pérez	6	4	2
3	(Portugal) Gastão Elias	3	6	6

=== Top half ===
First round
1	(Brazil) R Dutra Silva	6^{8}	4
(Slovenia) B Rola	7^{10}	6
(Italy) M Donati	6	6
Q	(Belgium) J De Loore	1	2
(Italy) G Naso	6	6
WC	(Italy) S Caruso	4	4
SE	(Spain) E López-Pérez	6	6
7	(Italy) L Vanni	3	4
4	(France) S Robert	7^{7}	6
(Japan) H Moriya	6^{5}	3
(Belgium) Y Mertens	6^{5}	6	0
(Italy) F Volandri	7^{7}	3	6
WC	(Italy) S Napolitano	6	6
(France) D Guez	4	4
WC	(Italy) L Sonego	6	3	6^{0}
8	(Belgium) K Coppejans	4	6	7^{7}

Second round
(Slovenia) B Rola	6	0
(Italy) M Donati	4	0^{r}
(Italy) G Naso	2	1
SE	(Spain) E López-Pérez	6	6
4	(France) S Robert	4	6^{2}
(Italy) F Volandri	6	7^{7}
WC	(Italy) S Napolitano	6	4	3
8	(Belgium) K Coppejans	4	6	6

Quarterfinals
(Slovenia) B Rola	6^{3}	2
SE	(Spain) E López-Pérez	7^{7}	6
(Italy) F Volandri	6	2	6
8	(Belgium) K Coppejans	2	6	2

Semifinals
SE	(Spain) E López-Pérez	7^{7}	6
(Italy) F Volandri	6^{5}	4

=== Bottom half ===
First round
6	(Netherlands) I Sijsling	3	5
(France) V Millot	6	7
(Chile) H Podlipnik	7^{7}	7
(Russia) A Karatsev	6^{4}	5
(Kazakhstan) A Golubev	3	6	3
Q	(Portugal) P Sousa	6	3	6
Q	(Germany) M Bachinger	5	7^{7}	1
3	(Portugal) G Elias	7	6^{2}	6
5	(Slovakia) A Martin	0	2
Q	(Croatia) N Mektić	6	6
(Serbia) L Djere	7	6
(Estonia) J Zopp	5	2
(Italy) A Giannessi	3^{r}
(Belarus) U Ignatik	5
WC	(Italy) Edoardo Eremin	3	6	7
2	(Italy) T Fabbiano	6	1	5

Second round
(France) V Millot	3	2
(Chile) H Podlipnik	6	6
Q	(Portugal) P Sousa	2	6	5
3	(Portugal) G Elias	6	4	7
Q	(Croatia) N Mektić	4	2
(Serbia) L Djere	6	6
(Belarus) U Ignatik	6	2	3
WC	(Italy) E Eremin	4	6	6

Quarterfinals
(Chile) H Podlipnik	6	4	6^{5}
3	(Portugal) G Elias	3	6	7^{7}
(Serbia) L Djere	6	6
WC	(Italy) E Eremin	3	3

Semifinals
3	(Portugal) G Elias	6	6
(Serbia) L Djere	3	2
