= 2017 Bangkok Challenger II – Singles =

Singles
- 2017 Bangkok Challenger II

Final
- Champion: (Serbia) Janko Tipsarević
- Runner-up: (China) Li Zhe
- Score: 6–2, 6–3

Events
Singles	Doubles
← 2016 ·	Bangkok Challenger II	· 2018 →

Mikhail Youzhny was the defending champion but chose not to participate.

Janko Tipsarević won the title after defeating Li Zhe 6–2, 6–3 in the final.

== Seeds ==
1. (Serbia) Janko Tipsarević (champion)
2. (Chile) Christian Garín (semifinals)
3. (Russia) Aslan Karatsev (first round)
4. (Czech Republic) Zdeněk Kolář (first round)
5. (France) Grégoire Barrère (first round)
6. (Belgium) Yannick Mertens (second round)
7. (France) Axel Michon (quarterfinals)
8. (Czech Republic) Václav Šafránek (first round)

== Draw ==
=== Key ===
- Q = Qualifier
- WC = Wild card
- LL = Lucky loser
- Alt = Alternate
- SE = Special exempt
- PR = Protected ranking
- ITF = ITF entry
- JE = Junior exempt
- w/o = Walkover
- r = Retired
- d = Defaulted
- SR = Special ranking

=== Finals ===
Semifinals
1	(Serbia) Janko Tipsarević	6	6
Q	(Germany) Daniel Altmaier	3	3
(China) Li Zhe	2	7^{8}	6
2	(Chile) Christian Garín	6	6^{6}	3

Final
1	(Serbia) Janko Tipsarević	6	6
(China) Li Zhe	2	3

=== Top half ===
First round
1	(Serbia) J Tipsarević	2	6	6
(Belarus) E Gerasimov	6	3	3
Q	(Chinese Taipei) J Wang	3	6^{8}
(France) S Doumbia	6	7^{10}
(Germany) K Krawietz	6	7
(France) A Olivetti	3	5
WC	(Thailand) Werapath Sirijatiyaporn	1	1
7	(France) A Michon	6	6
3	(Russia) A Karatsev	6	1	3
(Belgium) G Gigounon	4	6	6
Q	(Germany) D Altmaier	6	6
Q	(Chinese Taipei) K-y Lee	2	2
(Japan) Shuichi Sekiguchi	6	6
WC	(Thailand) Phassawit Burapharitta	1	4
WC	(Thailand) Patcharapol Kawin	2	3
6	(Belgium) Y Mertens	6	6

Second round
1	(Serbia) J Tipsarević	6	6
(France) S Doumbia	3	1
(Germany) K Krawietz	6	6^{6}	3
7	(France) A Michon	3	7^{8}	6
(Belgium) G Gigounon	3	4
Q	(Germany) D Altmaier	6	6
(Japan) S Sekiguchi	6	3	6
6	(Belgium) Y Mertens	3	6	1

Quarterfinals
1	(Serbia) J Tipsarević	6	6
7	(France) A Michon	2	2
Q	(Germany) D Altmaier	6	6
(Japan) S Sekiguchi	4	1

Semifinals
1	(Serbia) J Tipsarević	6	6
Q	(Germany) D Altmaier	3	3

=== Bottom half ===
First round
5	(France) G Barrère	6	3	1
(Italy) A Bega	3	6	6
(China) Z Li	6	6
(Turkey) C İlkel	3	3
(South Korea) S-w Kwon	1	1
(Germany) Y Maden	6	6
(Germany) N Langer	6	5	6
4	(Czech Republic) Z Kolář	0	7	3
8	(Czech Republic) V Šafránek	4	0
Q	(India) S Balaji	6	6
(Estonia) J Zopp	6	6
WC	(Thailand) Chaleechan Tanasugarn	0	0
(Croatia) N Mektić	4	6	2
(Portugal) F Ferreira Silva	6	3	6
(United States) D Nguyen	5	1
2	(Chile) C Garín	7	6

Second round
(Italy) A Bega	2	2
(China) Z Li	6	6
(Germany) Y Maden	7^{7}	6
(Germany) N Langer	6^{5}	4
Q	(India) S Balaji	2	2
(Estonia) J Zopp	6	6
(Portugal) F Ferreira Silva	7^{9}	3	2
2	(Chile) C Garin	6^{7}	6	6

Quarterfinals
(China) Z Li	4	7^{10}	6
(Germany) Y Maden	6	6^{8}	3
(Estonia) J Zopp	3	6^{4}
2	(Chile) C Garin	6	7^{7}

Semifinals
(China) Z Li	2	7^{8}	6
2	(Chile) C Garin	6	6^{6}	3
