= 2019 Bangkok Challenger II – Doubles =

Doubles
- 2019 Bangkok Challenger II

Final
- Champions: (China) Li Zhe (Portugal) Gonçalo Oliveira
- Runners-up: (Spain) Enrique López Pérez (Japan) Hiroki Moriya
- Score: 6–2, 6–1

Events
Singles	Doubles
- Bangkok Challenger II

James Cerretani and Joe Salisbury were the defending champions but chose not to defend their title.

Li Zhe and Gonçalo Oliveira won the title after defeating Enrique López Pérez and Hiroki Moriya 6–2, 6–1 in the final.

== Seeds ==
1. (China) Gong Maoxin / (China) Zhang Ze (semifinals, withdrew)
2. (Australia) Max Purcell / (Australia) Matt Reid (semifinals)
3. (China) Li Zhe / (Portugal) Gonçalo Oliveira (champions)
4. (India) Sriram Balaji / (India) Arjun Kadhe (first round)

== Draw ==
Key

- Q = Qualifier
- WC = Wild card
- LL = Lucky loser
- Alt = Alternate
- ITF = ITF entry
- PR = Protected ranking
- SR = Special ranking
- SE = Special exempt
- JE = Junior exempt
- JR = Junior Accelerator Programme entrant
- CO = College Accelerator Programme entrant
- NG = Next Gen Accelerator Program entrant
- w/o = Walkover
- r = Retired
- d = Defaulted

First round
1	(China) M Gong (China) Ze Zhang	7^{7}	6
ITF	(Spain) D Pérez Sanz (Spain) O Roca Batalla	6^{4}	0
WC	(Thailand) Vorachon Rakpuangchon (Thailand) Tanakorn Srirat	3	2
(Russia) I Gakhov (Italy) G Mager	6	6
4	(India) S Balaji (India) A Kadhe	7	4	[9]
(Spain) E López Pérez (Japan) H Moriya	5	6	[11]
(Thailand) Sa Ratiwatana (Thailand) So Ratiwatana	6	6
WC	(Thailand) Chotiwat Naen-Udorn (Thailand) Patthavut Saimongkol	1	0
ITF	(Philippines) F Alcantara (Portugal) B Saraiva	7^{7}	7^{7}
(Israel) J Erlich (India) S Myneni	6^{4}	6^{4}
(Kazakhstan) T Khabibulin (Chinese Taipei) T-h Yang	3	2
3	(China) Z Li (Portugal) G Oliveira	6	6
(Philippines) R Gonzales (United States) A Lawson	6	6
WC	(Thailand) P Isaro (Thailand) Chanchai Sookton-Eng	1	2
(Finland) H Heliövaara (Japan) T Matsui	6	3	[4]
2	(Australia) M Purcell (Australia) M Reid	3	6	[10]

Quarterfinals
1	(China) M Gong (China) Ze Zhang	w/o
(Russia) I Gakhov (Italy) G Mager
(Spain) E López Pérez (Japan) H Moriya	6	6
(Thailand) Sa Ratiwatana (Thailand) So Ratiwatana	3	2
ITF	(Philippines) F Alcantara (Portugal) B Saraiva	5	3
3	(China) Z Li (Portugal) G Oliveira	7	6
(Philippines) R Gonzales (United States) A Lawson	4	2
2	(Australia) M Purcell (Australia) M Reid	6	6

Semifinals
1	(China) M Gong (China) Ze Zhang
(Spain) E López Pérez (Japan) H Moriya	w/o
3	(China) Z Li (Portugal) G Oliveira	7^{7}	6
2	(Australia) M Purcell (Australia) M Reid	6^{2}	4

Final
(Spain) E López Pérez (Japan) H Moriya	2	1
3	(China) Z Li (Portugal) G Oliveira	6	6
