= 2016 ATP Challenger Torino =

Tennis Tournament

- Date: 18–24 April
- Edition: 2nd
- Draw: 32S / 16D
- Prize money: €42,500+H
- Surface: Clay (red)
- Location: Turin, Italy

Champions

Singles
- (Portugal) Gastão Elias

Doubles
- (Slovakia) Andrej Martin / (Chile) Hans Podlipnik
- ATP Challenger Torino

The 2016 ATP Challenger Torino was a professional tennis tournament played on clay courts. It was the second edition of the tournament which was part of the 2016 ATP Challenger Tour. It took place in Turin, Italy between 18 and 24 April.

== Singles main-draw entrants ==
=== Seeds ===
Country	Player	Rank^{1}	Seed
BRA	Rogério Dutra Silva	100	1
ITA	Thomas Fabbiano	106	2
POR	Gastão Elias	118	3
FRA	Stéphane Robert	121	4
SVK	Andrej Martin	127	5
NED	Igor Sijsling	132	6
ITA	Luca Vanni	141	7
BEL	Kimmer Coppejans	146	8

- ^{1} Rankings as of 11 April 2016

=== Other entrants ===
The following players received wildcards into the singles main draw:

- (Italy) Salvatore Caruso
- (Italy) Stefano Napolitano
- (Italy) Lorenzo Sonego
- (Italy) Edoardo Eremin

The following player received entry into the singles main draw as special exempt:

- (Spain) Enrique López Pérez

The following players received entry from the qualifying draw:

- (Belgium) Joris De Loore
- (Portugal) Pedro Sousa
- (Germany) Matthias Bachinger
- (Croatia) Nikola Mektić

== Champions ==
=== Singles ===
- (Portugal) Gastão Elias def. (Spain) Enrique López Pérez, 3–6, 6–4, 6–2

=== Doubles ===
- (Slovakia) Andrej Martin / (Chile) Hans Podlipnik def. (Australia) Rameez Junaid / (Poland) Mateusz Kowalczyk, 4–6, 7–6^{(7–3)}, [12–10]
