= 2016 Wind Energy Holding Bangkok Open =

- Date: 29 August – 4 September
- Edition: 1st
- Surface: Hard
- Location: Bangkok, Thailand

Champions

Singles
- (Slovenia) Blaž Kavčič

Doubles
- (Thailand) Wishaya Trongcharoenchaikul / (Thailand) Kittipong Wachiramanowong
- Wind Energy Holding Bangkok Open

The 2016 Wind Energy Holding Bangkok Open was a professional tennis tournament played on hard courts. It was the first edition of the tournament which was part of the 2016 ATP Challenger Tour. It took place in Bangkok, Thailand between 29 August – 4 September 2016.

== Singles main-draw entrants ==
=== Seeds ===
Country	Player	Rank^{1}	Seed
JPN	Go Soeda	147	1
CHN	Wu Di	178	2
KOR	Lee Duck-hee	191	3
ISR	Amir Weintraub	209	4
CHN	Li Zhe	249	5
TPE	Chen Ti	256	6
GER	Marc Sieber	288	7
JPN	Yuya Kibi	290	8

- ^{1} Rankings were as of August 22, 2016.

=== Other entrants ===
The following players received wildcards into the singles main draw:

- (Thailand) Phassawit Burapharitta
- (Thailand) Wishaya Trongcharoenchaikul
- (Thailand) Jirat Navasirisomboon
- (Thailand) Kittipong Wachiramanowong

The following players received entry from the qualifying draw:

- (Belarus) Sergey Betov
- (United States) Connor Farren
- (China) Gao Xin
- (India) Sidharth Rawat

== Champions ==
=== Singles ===
- (Slovenia) Blaž Kavčič def. (Japan) Go Soeda, 6–0, 1–0 ret.

=== Doubles ===
- (Thailand) Wishaya Trongcharoenchaikul / (Thailand) Kittipong Wachiramanowong def. (Thailand) Sanchai Ratiwatana / (Thailand) Sonchat Ratiwatana, 7–6^{(11–9)}, 6–3
