= 2017 Bangkok Challenger II =

- Date: 9–14 January
- Edition: 2nd
- Draw: 32S / 16D
- Prize money: $50,000
- Surface: Hard
- Location: Bangkok, Thailand

Champions

Singles
- (Serbia) Janko Tipsarević

Doubles
- (Thailand) Sanchai Ratiwatana / (Thailand) Sonchat Ratiwatana
← 2016 ·	Bangkok Challenger II	· 2018 →

The 2017 Bangkok Challenger II was a professional tennis tournament played on hard courts. It was second edition of the tournament and part of the 2017 ATP Challenger Tour. It took place in Bangkok, Thailand between 9 and 14 January 2017.

== Singles main-draw entrants ==
=== Seeds ===
Country	Player	Rank^{1}	Seed
SRB	Janko Tipsarević	144	1
CHI	Cristian Garín	211	2
RUS	Aslan Karatsev	235	3
CZE	Zdeněk Kolář	244	4
FRA	Grégoire Barrère	247	5
BEL	Yannick Mertens	251	6
FRA	Axel Michon	259	7
CZE	Václav Šafránek	261	8

- ^{1} Rankings are as of January 2, 2017.

=== Other entrants ===
The following players received wildcards into the singles main draw:

- (Thailand) Phassawit Burapharitta
- (Thailand) Patcharapol Kawin
- (Thailand) Werapath Sirijatiyaporn
- (Thailand) Chaleechan Tanasugarn

The following players received entry from the qualifying draw:

- (Germany) Daniel Altmaier
- (India) Sriram Balaji
- (Chinese Taipei) Lee Kuan-yi
- (Chinese Taipei) Jimmy Wang

== Champions ==
=== Singles ===
- (Serbia) Janko Tipsarević def. (China) Li Zhe, 6–2, 6–3.

=== Doubles ===
- (Thailand) Sanchai Ratiwatana / (Thailand) Sonchat Ratiwatana def. (France) Sadio Doumbia / (France) Fabien Reboul, 7–6^{(7–4)}, 7–5.
