= Wind Energy Holding Bangkok Open =

- 2016 Wind Energy Holding Bangkok Open

Defunct tennis tournament
- Event name: Wind Energy Holding Bangkok Open
- Location: Bangkok, Thailand
- Category: ATP Challenger Tour
- Surface: Hard
- Draw: 32S/32Q/16D
- Prize money: $50,000

The Wind Energy Holding Bangkok Open is a professional tennis tournament played on hardcourts. It is currently part of the ATP Challenger Tour. It was held in Bangkok, Thailand, in 2016.

== Past finals ==
=== Singles ===
Year	Champion	Runner-up	Score
2016	(Slovenia) Blaž Kavčič	(Japan) Go Soeda	6–0, 1–0 ret.

=== Doubles ===
Year	Champions	Runners-up	Score
2016	(Thailand) Wishaya Trongcharoenchaikul (Thailand) Kittipong Wachiramanowong	(Thailand) Sanchai Ratiwatana (Thailand) Sonchat Ratiwatana	7–6^{(11–9)}, 6–3
