= Enrique López Pérez =

Spanish tennis player (born 1991)

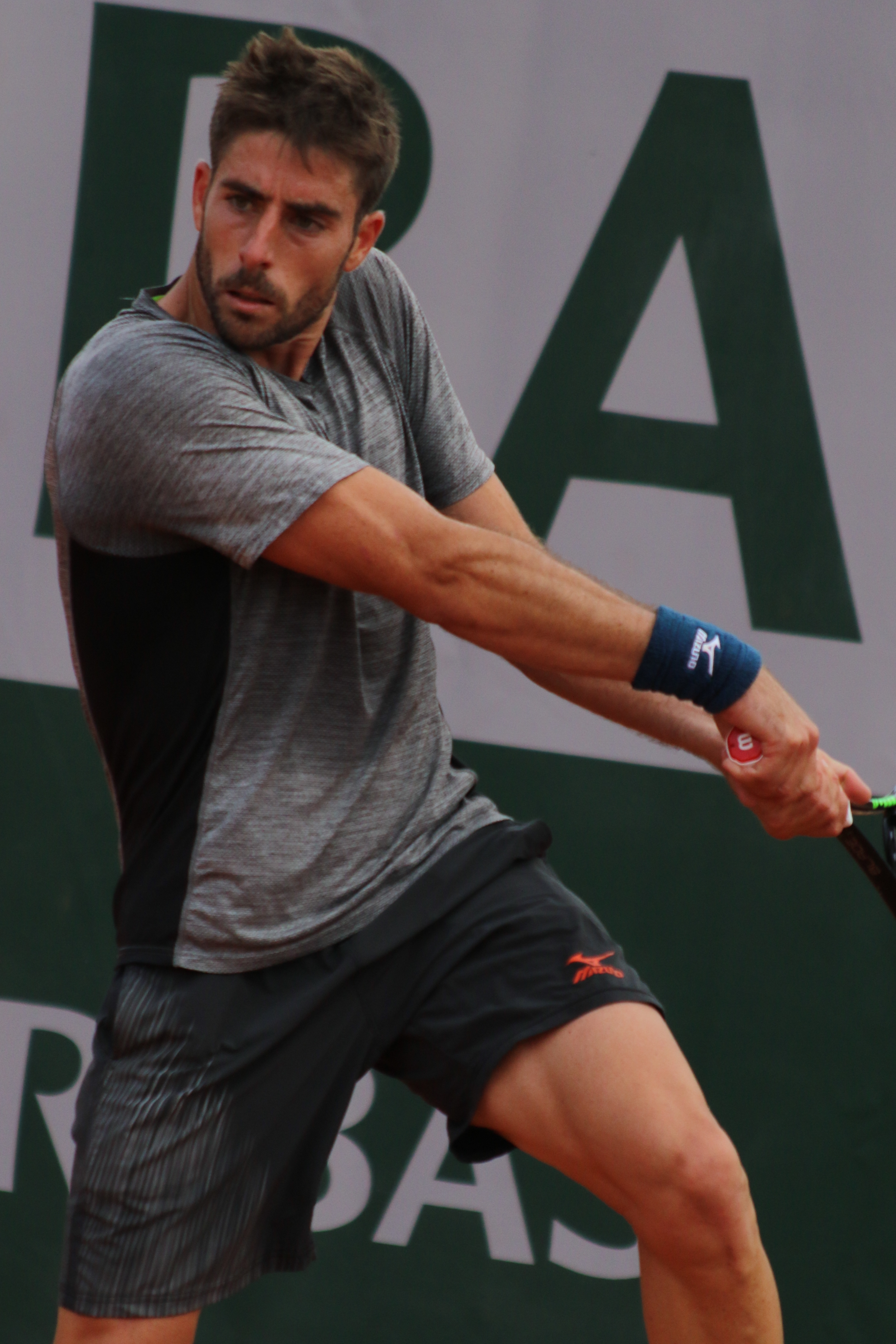
- López Pérez at the 2019 French Open
- Country (sports): Spain
- Residence: Madrid, Spain
- Born: 3 June 1991 (age 35) Madrid, Spain
- Height: 1.8 m (5 ft 11 in)
- Turned pro: 2009
- Plays: Right-handed (two-handed backhand)
- Coach: Víctor Recio García
- Prize money: US$501,753

Singles
- Career record: 0–1
- Career titles: 0
- Highest ranking: No. 154 (16 July 2018)

Grand Slam singles results
- Australian Open: Q2 (2014, 2019)
- French Open: Q1 (2014, 2018, 2019)
- Wimbledon: Q2 (2016, 2018)
- US Open: Q3 (2016)

Doubles
- Career record: 0–0
- Career titles: 0 (4 Challenger, 27 Futures)
- Highest ranking: No. 135 (15 April 2019)
- Last updated on: 22 March 2020.

Enrique López Pérez (Spanish pronunciation: [enˈrike ˈlopeθ ˈpeɾeθ]; born 3 June 1991) is a Spanish professional tennis player playing on the ATP Challenger Tour. On 16 July 2018, he reached his highest ATP singles ranking of 154 and his highest doubles ranking of 135 was achieved on 15 April 2019.

López Pérez was provisionally suspended by the Tennis Integrity Unit in December 2019, later receiving an eight-year ban from the sport for match-fixing in three separate instances in 2017.

== Challenger and Futures Finals ==
=== Singles: 38 (26–12) ===
Legend (singles) ATP Challenger Tour (1–3) ITF Futures Tour (25–9)	Titles by surface Hard (7–5) Clay (19–7) Grass (0–0) Carpet (0–0)

Result	W–L	Date	Tournament	Tier	Surface	Opponent	Score
Win	1–0	Oct 2011	Bolivia F3, Santa Cruz	Futures	Clay	(Peru) Sergio Galdós	6–1, 6–4
Win	2–0	Oct 2012	Nigeria F1, Lagos	Futures	Hard	(Egypt) Sherif Sabry	7–5, 1–6, 6–4
Win	3–0	Oct 2012	Nigeria F2, Lagos	Futures	Hard	(South Africa) Ruan Roelofse	6–0, 6–4
Win	4–0	Apr 2013	Egypt F2, Cairo	Futures	Clay	(Spain) Pol Toledo Bagué	2–6, 6–0, 6–4
Loss	4–1	Jun 2013	Korea F6, Gimcheon	Futures	Hard	(South Korea) Chung Hyeon	2–6, 3–6
Win	5–1	Sep 2013	Egypt F26, Sharm El Sheikh	Futures	Clay	(India) Prajnesh Gunneswaran	6–0, 6–0
Loss	5–2	Oct 2013	Egypt F27, Sharm El Sheikh	Futures	Clay	(Egypt) Karim Hossam	6–7^{(4–7)}, 6–7^{(4–7)}
Loss	5–3	Oct 2013	Egypt F30, Sharm El Sheikh	Futures	Clay	(France) Axel Michon	3–6, 4–6
Win	6–3	Feb 2014	Guatemala F1, Guatemala City	Futures	Hard	(Guatemala) Christopher Díaz Figueroa	6–3, 0–6, 6–4
Win	7–3	Mar 2014	India F3, Chennai	Futures	Clay	(India) Sanam Singh	6–1, 4–6, 6–2
Win	8–3	Mar 2014	India F4, Trichy	Futures	Clay	(India) Sriram Balaji	6–4, 6–4
Win	9–3	Mar 2014	India F5, Madurai	Futures	Clay	(Sweden) Lucas Renard	6–2, 6–0
Loss	9–4	Oct 2014	Kazakhstan F12, Shymkent	Futures	Clay	(Russia) Ivan Gakhov	4–6, 0–6
Win	10–4	Oct 2014	Kazakhstan F13, Shymkent	Futures	Clay	(France) Maxime Hamou	6–2, 6–2
Win	11–4	Oct 2014	Kazakhstan F14, Shymkent	Futures	Clay	(Russia) Ivan Gakhov	6–3, 4–6, 6–1
Loss	11–5	Dec 2014	Togo F1, Lomé	Futures	Hard	(Belgium) Maxime Authom	5–7, 1–6
Win	12–5	Mar 2015	India F1, Chandigarh	Futures	Hard	(India) Karunuday Singh	6–2, 6–3
Win	13–5	Oct 2015	Philippines F2, Manila	Futures	Clay (i)	(Japan) Kento Takeuchi	7–6^{(7–4)}, 6–4
Loss	13–6	Jan 2016	Egypt F1, Sharm El Sheikh	Futures	Hard	(Egypt) Mohamed Safwat	3–6, 5–7
Loss	13–7	Feb 2016	China F1, Anning	Futures	Clay	(Serbia) Miljan Zekić	4–6, 4–6
Win	14–7	Feb 2016	China F2, Anning	Futures	Clay	(Serbia) Miljan Zekić	6–3, 6–3
Win	15–7	Mar 2016	China F3, Anning	Futures	Clay	(South Korea) Kim Young-seok	6–4, 7–6^{(7–4)}
Loss	15–8	Apr 2016	Turin, Italy	Challenger	Clay	(Portugal) Gastão Elias	6–3, 4–6, 2–6
Win	16–8	Oct 2016	Nigeria F5, Lagos	Futures	Hard	(France) Gianni Mina	6–2, 6–7^{(7–9)}, 6–1
Win	17–8	Oct 2016	Nigeria F6, Lagos	Futures	Hard	(France) Calvin Hemery	7–5, 7–5
Loss	17–9	Jul 2017	Germany F7, Trier	Futures	Clay	(Russia) Alexey Vatutin	6–2, 4–6, 2–6
Win	18–9	Aug 2017	Hungary F6, Budapest	Futures	Clay	(Hungary) Zsombor Piros	6–3, 6–0
Win	19–9	Sep 2017	Hungary F8, Székesfehérvár	Futures	Clay	(Czech Republic) Zdeněk Kolář	6–1, 6–1
Win	20–9	Sep 2017	Kazakhstan F6, Shymkent	Futures	Clay	(Bosnia and Herzegovina) Tomislav Brkić	2–6, 6–4, 6–4
Win	21–9	Dec 2017	Egypt F36, Cairo	Futures	Clay	(Spain) Mario Vilella Martínez	6–4, 6–3
Win	22–9	Dec 2017	Egypt F37, Cairo	Futures	Clay	(Spain) Mario Vilella Martínez	6–4, 6–2
Win	23–9	Dec 2017	Pakistan F2, Islamabad	Futures	Clay	(Russia) Ivan Nedelko	7–6^{(7–1)}, 6–1
Loss	23–10	Dec 2017	Pakistan F3, Islamabad	Futures	Clay	(Russia) Ivan Nedelko	4–6, 6–7^{(4–7)}
Loss	23–11	Jan 2018	Bangkok, Thailand	Challenger	Hard	(Spain) Marcel Granollers	6–4, 2–6, 0–6
Win	24–11	Feb 2018	Turkey F4, Antalya	Futures	Clay	(Romania) Dragoș Dima	6–2, 6–3
Win	25–11	Feb 2018	Turkey F5, Antalya	Futures	Clay	(Croatia) Nino Serdarušić	6–3, 6–3
Loss	25–12	Oct 2018	Fergana, Uzbekistan	Challenger	Hard	(Serbia) Nikola Milojević	3–6, 4–6
Win	26-12	Mar 2019	Zhuhai, China	Challenger	Hard	(Russia) Evgeny Karlovskiy	6–1, 6–4

=== Doubles: 62 (31–31) ===
Legend (doubles) ATP Challenger Tour (4–9) ITF Futures Tour (27–22)	Titles by surface Hard (9–14) Clay (22–17) Grass (0–0) Carpet (0–0)

Result	W–L	Date	Tournament	Tier	Surface	Partner	Opponents	Score
Loss	0–1	Sep 2010	Spain F34, Madrid	Futures	Hard	(Spain) Iván Arenas-Gualda	(Spain) Óscar Burrieza López (Spain) Javier Martí	0–6, 3–6
Loss	0–2	Oct 2010	Spain F36, Córdoba	Futures	Hard	(Spain) Iván Arenas-Gualda	(Portugal) João Sousa (Spain) Israel Vior-Díaz	6–7^{(6–8)}, 6–4, [3–10]
Loss	0–3	Mar 2011	Spain F9, Barcelona	Futures	Clay	(Spain) Arnau Dachs	(Spain) Miguel Ángel López Jaén (Spain) Gabriel Trujillo Soler	2–6, 0–6
Win	1–3	May 2011	Morocco F3, Agadir	Futures	Clay	(Netherlands) Mark Vervoort	(Portugal) Gonçalo Pereira (Italy) Matthieu Viérin	6–3, 6–1
Win	2–3	Jul 2011	Spain F25, Gandia	Futures	Clay	(Spain) Iván Arenas-Gualda	(Italy) Massimo Capone (Italy) Giulio Torroni	6–4, 7–6^{(7–0)}
Win	3–3	Jul 2011	Spain F26, Dénia	Futures	Clay	(Spain) Iván Arenas-Gualda	(Spain) Guillermo Gómez Díaz (United Kingdom) Michael Suleau	6–2, 6–4
Loss	3–4	Aug 2011	Spain F27, Xàtiva	Futures	Clay	(Spain) Iván Arenas-Gualda	(Italy) Francesco Aldi (Italy) Marco Cecchinato	4–6, 3–6
Loss	3–5	Aug 2011	Spain F28, Irun	Futures	Clay	(Spain) Iván Arenas-Gualda	(Spain) Roberto Carballés Baena (Spain) Pablo Carreño Busta	4–6, 2–6
Win	4–5	Feb 2012	France F3, Feucherolles	Futures	Hard (i)	(Spain) Iván Arenas-Gualda	(Poland) Marcin Gawron (Poland) Andriej Kapaś	5–7, 7–6^{(7–2)}, [10–8]
Win	5–5	Apr 2012	Qatar F1, Doha	Futures	Hard	(Spain) Jordi Samper Montaña	(Russia) Alexei Filenkov (Ukraine) Denys Mylokostov	6–4, 7–5
Win	6–5	Apr 2012	Spain F8, Les Franqueses del Vallès	Futures	Hard	(Spain) Iván Arenas-Gualda	(Spain) Guillermo Gómez Díaz (Spain) Andoni Vivanco-Guzmán	7–6^{(7–3)}, 6–4
Win	7–5	May 2012	Spain F13, Getxo	Futures	Clay	(Spain) Iván Arenas-Gualda	(United States) Austin Krajicek (United States) Rhyne Williams	6–7^{(5–7)}, 7–6^{(7–4)}, [10–7]
Win	8–5	Jun 2012	Spain F14, Madrid	Futures	Clay	(Spain) Iván Arenas-Gualda	(Greece) Alexandros Jakupovic (Netherlands) Mark Vervoort	6–0, 6–2
Loss	8–6	Jun 2012	Serbia F2, Belgrade	Futures	Clay	(Spain) Juan Lizariturry	(Serbia) Nikola Čačić (Montenegro) Goran Tošić	2–6, 4–6
Loss	8–7	Sep 2012	Spain F26, Santander	Futures	Clay	(Spain) Iván Arenas-Gualda	(Spain) Miguel Ángel López Jaén (Spain) Gabriel Trujillo Soler	3–6, 7–6^{(9–7)}, [5–10]
Loss	8–8	Sep 2012	Spain F28, Getafe	Futures	Hard	(Spain) Iván Arenas-Gualda	(Spain) Miguel Ángel López Jaén (Spain) Oriol Roca Batalla	6–7^{(6–8)}, 6–2, [8–10]
Loss	8–9	Oct 2012	Nigeria F1, Lagos	Futures	Hard	(Italy) Alessandro Bega	(Slovakia) Kamil Čapkovič (South Africa) Ruan Roelofse	4–6, 2–6
Loss	8–10	Oct 2012	Nigeria F2, Lagos	Futures	Hard	(Italy) Alessandro Bega	(Slovakia) Kamil Čapkovič (South Africa) Ruan Roelofse	1–6, 2–6
Win	9–10	Nov 2012	Morocco F9, Fes	Futures	Clay	(Spain) Juan-Samuel Arauzo-Martínez	(Italy) Riccardo Bellotti (Austria) Dominic Thiem	6–2, 5–7, [10–7]
Win	10–10	Jan 2013	France F1, Bagnoles-de-l'Orne	Futures	Clay (i)	(Spain) Iván Arenas-Gualda	(Germany) Moritz Baumann (Germany) Tim Pütz	w/o
Win	11–10	Mar 2013	Portugal F2, Loulé	Futures	Hard	(Spain) Iván Arenas-Gualda	(Republic of Ireland) Sam Barry (Republic of Ireland) Colin O'Brien	6–7^{(2–7)}, 7–6^{(7–5)}, [10–4]
Loss	11–11	Mar 2013	Portugal F3, Faro	Futures	Hard	(Spain) Iván Arenas-Gualda	(Spain) Juan-Samuel Arauzo-Martínez (Spain) Jaime Pulgar-García	2–6, 6–2, [2–10]
Loss	11–12	Apr 2013	Egypt F2, Cairo	Futures	Clay	(Netherlands) Mark Vervoort	(Netherlands) Stephan Fransen (Netherlands) Wesley Koolhof	0–6, 3–6
Loss	11–13	Jun 2013	Korea F4, Changwon	Futures	Hard	(Lithuania) Laurynas Grigelis	(South Korea) Lim Yong-kyu (South Korea) Nam Ji-sung	7–5, 4–6, [9–11]
Loss	11–14	Jun 2013	Korea F5, Gyeongsan	Futures	Hard	(Japan) Hiroki Kondo	(South Korea) Chung Hong (South Korea) Noh Sang-woo	3–6, 6–0, [6–10]
Win	12–14	Jun 2013	Korea F7, Gimcheon	Futures	Hard	(Chinese Taipei) Huang Liang-chi	(South Korea) Lim Yong-kyu (South Korea) Nam Ji-sung	6–4, 6–2
Win	13–14	Sep 2013	Egypt F26, Sharm El Sheikh	Futures	Clay	(Netherlands) Romano Frantzen	(Czech Republic) Libor Salaba (Czech Republic) Michal Schmid	6–4, 4–6, [10–3]
Win	14–14	Oct 2013	Egypt F27, Sharm El Sheikh	Futures	Clay	(Netherlands) Romano Frantzen	(Egypt) Karim Hossam (Czech Republic) Libor Salaba	6–2, 6–1
Win	15–14	Oct 2013	Egypt F30, Sharm El Sheikh	Futures	Clay	(Netherlands) Romano Frantzen	(Russia) Ivan Gakhov (Spain) Miguel Ángel López Jaén	6–4, 7–6^{(7–4)}
Loss	15–15	Feb 2014	El Salvador F1, Santa Tecla	Futures	Clay	(El Salvador) Marcelo Arévalo	(Argentina) Mateo Nicolás Martínez (Peru) Rodrigo Sánchez	6–3, 6–7^{(4–7)}, [11–13]
Loss	15–16	Jun 2014	Romania F3, Bacău	Futures	Clay	(Brazil) João Walendowsky	(Romania) Patrick Grigoriu (Romania) Costin Pavăl	1–6, 4–6
Loss	15–17	Jun 2014	Caltanissetta, Italy	Challenger	Clay	(Spain) Pablo Carreño Busta	(Italy) Daniele Bracciali (Italy) Potito Starace	3–6, 3–6
Win	16–17	Aug 2014	San Marino, San Marino	Challenger	Clay	(Moldova) Radu Albot	(Croatia) Franko Škugor (Hungary) Adrian Ungur	6–4, 6–1
Loss	16–18	Aug 2014	Como, Italy	Challenger	Clay	(Canada) Steven Diez	(Argentina) Guido Andreozzi (Argentina) Facundo Argüello	2–6, 2–6
Win	17–18	Oct 2014	Kazakhstan F12, Shymkent	Futures	Clay	(India) Jeevan Nedunchezhiyan	(Ukraine) Yurii Dzhavakian (Ukraine) Olexiy Kolisnyk	7–5, 6–0
Win	18–18	Oct 2014	Kazakhstan F13, Shymkent	Futures	Clay	(India) Jeevan Nedunchezhiyan	(Bulgaria) Aleksandar Lazov (Georgia (country)) Aleksandre Metreveli	6–3, 6–3
Win	19–18	Oct 2014	Kazakhstan F14, Shymkent	Futures	Clay	(Russia) Ivan Gakhov	(Russia) Alan Bzarov (Russia) Konstantin Gerlakh	7–5, 6–3
Loss	19–19	Dec 2014	Turkey F46, Istanbul	Futures	Clay	(Turkey) Tuna Altuna	(Russia) Alexander Igoshin (Russia) Alexander Perfilov	5–7, 4–6
Loss	19–20	Mar 2015	India F1, Chandigarh	Futures	Hard	(Spain) David Pérez Sanz	(India) Jeevan Nedunchezhiyan (India) Vijay Sundar Prashanth	3–6, 4–6
Win	20–20	Apr 2015	China F1, Anning	Futures	Clay	(Chinese Taipei) Huang Liang-chi	(China) Bai Yan (Chinese Taipei) Yang Tsung-hua	6–3, 4–6, [10–7]
Loss	20–21	Apr 2015	China F2, Anning	Futures	Clay	(Chinese Taipei) Huang Liang-chi	(China) Gao Xin (China) Ouyang Bowen	6–7^{(3–7)}, 4–6
Loss	20–22	Apr 2015	China F3, Anning	Futures	Clay	(Chinese Taipei) Huang Liang-chi	(South Korea) Kim Cheong-eui (Japan) Issei Okamura	3–3 ret.
Win	21–22	Oct 2015	Philippines F1, Manila	Futures	Clay (i)	(Australia) Harry Bourchier	(Japan) Issei Okamura (Japan) Kento Takeuchi	6–4, 6–3
Win	22–22	Jan 2016	Egypt F1, Sharm El Sheikh	Futures	Hard	(Serbia) Darko Jandrić	(Lithuania) Lukas Mugevičius (Egypt) Mohamed Safwat	6–3, 6–4
Loss	22–23	Jan 2016	Egypt F2, Sharm El Sheikh	Futures	Hard	(France) Laurent Rochette	(Switzerland) Luca Margaroli (Egypt) Mohamed Safwat	3–6, 6–3, [7–10]
Win	23–23	Feb 2016	China F2, Anning	Futures	Clay	(Chinese Taipei) Lin Hsin	(China) Sun Fajing (China) Wang Aoran	w/o
Win	24–23	May 2016	Karshi, Uzbekistan	Challenger	Hard	(India) Jeevan Nedunchezhiyan	(Georgia (country)) Aleksandre Metreveli (Kazakhstan) Dmitry Popko	6–1, 6–4
Loss	24–24	Sep 2016	Seville, Spain	Challenger	Clay	(Uruguay) Ariel Behar	(Spain) Íñigo Cervantes Huegun (Spain) Oriol Roca Batalla	2–6, 5–6 ret.
Win	25–24	Oct 2016	Nigeria F5, Lagos	Futures	Hard	(Netherlands) Boy Westerhof	(France) Calvin Hemery (France) Gianni Mina	6–2, 6–3
Win	26–24	Sep 2017	Hungary F7, Kecskemét	Futures	Clay	(Croatia) Matej Sabanov	(Sweden) Filip Bergevi (Sweden) Markus Eriksson	7–5, 6–3
Loss	27–24	Sep 2017	Kazakhstan F7, Shymkent	Futures	Clay	(Argentina) Marco Trungelliti	(Hungary) Gábor Borsos (Ukraine) Vladyslav Manafov	6–2, 6–3
Win	28–24	Dec 2017	Pakistan F3, Islamabad	Futures	Clay	(Russia) Kristian Lozan	(Ukraine) Gleb Alekseenko (Russia) Ivan Ponomarenko	6–0, 6–2
Loss	28–25	Jan 2018	Bangkok, Thailand	Challenger	Hard	(Spain) Pedro Martínez	(United States) James Cerretani (United Kingdom) Joe Salisbury	7–6^{(7–5)}, 3–6, [8–10]
Loss	28–26	Feb 2018	Turkey F4, Antalya	Futures	Clay	(Italy) Flavio Cipolla	(Austria) Pascal Brunner (Croatia) Nino Serdarušić	3–6, 2–6
Win	29–26	Feb 2018	Turkey F5, Antalya	Futures	Clay	(Italy) Flavio Cipolla	(Romania) Vasile Antonescu (Romania) Patrick Grigoriu	7–5, 6–2
Loss	29–27	Apr 2018	Tallahassee, USA	Challenger	Clay	(India) Jeevan Nedunchezhiyan	(United States) Robert Galloway (United States) Denis Kudla	3–6, 1–6
Loss	29–28	May 2018	Savannah, USA	Challenger	Clay	(India) Jeevan Nedunchezhiyan	(United Kingdom) Luke Bambridge (Australia) Akira Santillan	2–6, 2–6
Win	30–28	Jun 2018	Vicenza, Italy	Challenger	Clay	(Uruguay) Ariel Behar	(Argentina) Facundo Bagnis (Brazil) Fabricio Neis	6–2, 6–4
Win	31–28	Sep 2018	Mallorca, Spain	Challenger	Hard	(Uruguay) Ariel Behar	(United Kingdom) Daniel Evans (Spain) Gerard Granollers Pujol	w/o
Loss	31–29	Oct 2018	Tashkent, Uzbekistan	Challenger	Hard	(Italy) Federico Gaio	(Uzbekistan) Sanjar Fayziev (Uzbekistan) Jurabek Karimov	2–6, 7–6^{(7–3)}, [9–11]
Loss	31–30	Jan 2019	Playford, Australia	Challenger	Hard	(Uruguay) Ariel Behar	(Australia) Max Purcell (Australia) Luke Saville	4–6, 5–7
Loss	31–31	Feb 2019	Bangkok, Thailand	Challenger	Hard	(Japan) Hiroki Moriya	(China) Li Zhe (Portugal) Gonçalo Oliveira	2–6, 1–6

== See also ==
- Match fixing in tennis
- Tennis Integrity Unit
