= ATP Challenger Torino =

- 2016 ATP Challenger Torino

ATP Challenger Tour
- Location: Turin, Italy
- Venue: Ace Tennis Center, Volvera; Monviso Sporting Club, Grugliasco
- Category: ATP Challenger Tour
- Surface: Clay
- Draw: 32S/15Q/16D
- Prize money: €42,500+H

The ATP Challenger Torino was a tennis tournament held in Turin, Italy in 2015 and 2016. The event was part of the ATP Challenger Tour and was played on outdoor clay courts.

== Past finals ==
=== Singles ===
Year	Champion	Runner-up	Score
2016	(Portugal) Gastão Elias	(Spain) Enrique López Pérez	3–6, 6–4, 6–2
2015	(Italy) Marco Cecchinato	(Belgium) Kimmer Coppejans	6–2, 6–3

=== Doubles ===
Year	Champions	Runners-up	Score
2016	(Slovakia) Andrej Martin (Chile) Hans Podlipnik	(Australia) Rameez Junaid (Poland) Mateusz Kowalczyk	4–6, 7–6^{(7–3)}, [12–10]
2015	(Netherlands) Wesley Koolhof (Netherlands) Matwé Middelkoop	(Croatia) Dino Marcan (Croatia) Antonio Šančić	4–6, 6–3, [10–5]
