= Bangkok Challenger II =

- 2019 Bangkok Challenger II

Defunct tennis tournament
- Location: Bangkok, Thailand
- Venue: Rama Gardens Hotel
- Category: ATP Challenger Tour
- Surface: Hard / Outdoors
- Draw: 32S/32Q/16D
- Prize money: €50,000+H

The Bangkok Challenger II was a tennis tournament held in Bangkok, Thailand from 2016 until 2020. The event was part of the ATP Challenger Tour and is played on outdoor hardcourts.

== Past finals ==
=== Singles ===
Year	Champion	Runner-up	Score
2016	(Russia) Mikhail Youzhny	(Czech Republic) Adam Pavlásek	6–4, 6–1
2017	(Serbia) Janko Tipsarević	(China) Li Zhe	6–2, 6–3
2018	(Spain) Marcel Granollers	(Spain) Enrique López Pérez	4–6, 6–2, 6–0
2019	(Australia) James Duckworth	(Spain) Alejandro Davidovich Fokina	6–4, 6–3
2020	(Italy) Federico Gaio	(Netherlands) Robin Haase	6–1, 4–6, 4–2 ret.

=== Doubles ===
Year	Champions	Runners-up	Score
2016	(Netherlands) Wesley Koolhof (Netherlands) Matwé Middelkoop	(Germany) Gero Kretschmer (Germany) Alexander Satschko	6–3, 7–6^{(7–1)}
2017	(Thailand) Sanchai Ratiwatana (Thailand) Sonchat Ratiwatana	(France) Sadio Doumbia (France) Fabien Reboul	7–6^{(7–4)}, 7–5
2018	(United States) James Cerretani (United Kingdom) Joe Salisbury	(Spain) Enrique López Pérez (Spain) Pedro Martínez	6–7^{(5–7)}, 6–3, [10–8]
2019	(China) Li Zhe (Portugal) Gonçalo Oliveira	(Spain) Enrique López Pérez (Japan) Hiroki Moriya	6–2, 6–1
2020	(Ecuador) Gonzalo Escobar (Mexico) Miguel Ángel Reyes-Varela	(China) Gong Maoxin (China) Zhang Ze	6–3, 6–3
