= Wishaya Trongcharoenchaikul =

Thai tennis player

Wishaya Trongcharoenchaikul วิชยา ตรงเจริญชัยกุล
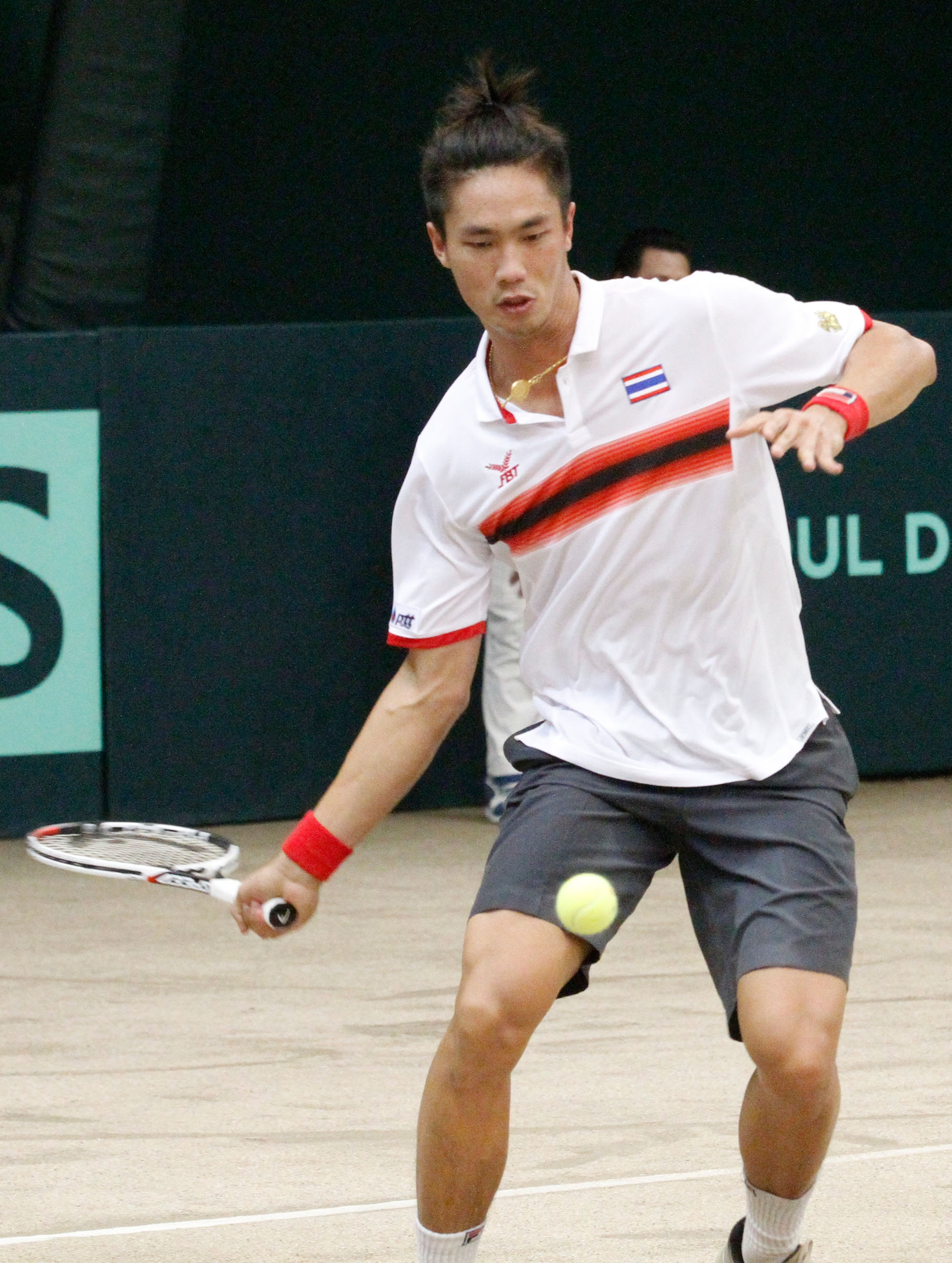
- Country (sports): Thailand
- Born: 8 April 1995 (age 31) Bangkok, Thailand
- Height: 1.93 m (6 ft 4 in)
- Plays: Right-handed (two-handed backhand)
- Prize money: US $145,258

Singles
- Career record: 11–11
- Career titles: 0
- Highest ranking: No. 395 (8 October 2018)
- Current ranking: No. 970 (19 October 2026)

Doubles
- Career record: 0–3
- Career titles: 0
- Highest ranking: No. 450 (14 August 2017)
- Current ranking: No. 602 (19 October 2026)
Medal record
Men's Tennis
Representing Thailand
Southeast Asian Games
Bronze medal – third place	2017 Kuala Lumpur	Singles
Bronze medal – third place	2017 Kuala Lumpur	Doubles
- Last updated on: 19 October 2026.

Wishaya Trongcharoenchaikul (Thai: วิชยา ตรงเจริญชัยกุล; born 8 April 1995) is a Thai tennis player. Trongcharoenchaikul has a career high ATP singles ranking of No. 395 achieved on 3 October 2018 and a career high doubles ranking of No. 450 achieved on 14 August 2017. Trongcharoenchaikul has won 1 ATP Challenger doubles title at the 2016 Wind Energy Holding Bangkok Open.

== Tour titles ==
Legend
Grand Slam (0)
ATP Masters Series (0)
ATP Tour (0)
Challengers (1)

=== Doubles ===
Result	Date	Category	Tournament	Surface	Partner	Opponents	Score
Win	3 September 2016	Challenger	Bangkok, Thailand	Hard	(Thailand) Kittipong Wachiramanowong	(Thailand) Sanchai Ratiwatana (Thailand) Sonchat Ratiwatana	7–6^{(11–9)}, 6–3
