= 2018 ATP Challenger Tour =

Tennis tour

Details
- Duration: 1 January 2018 – 25 November 2018
- Edition: 41st (10th under this name)
- Tournaments: 159
- Categories: Challenger 125 (20); Challenger 110 (8); Challenger 100 (9); Challenger 90 (36); Challenger 80 (86)

Achievements (singles)
- Most titles: (Argentina) Guido Andreozzi (4)
- Most finals: (Australia) Jordan Thompson (8)

The ATP Challenger Tour, in 2018, was the secondary professional tennis circuit organized by the ATP. The 2018 ATP Challenger Tour calendar comprised 159 tournaments, with prize money ranging from $50,000 up to $150,000. It was the 41st edition of challenger tournaments cycle, and 10th under the name of Challenger Tour.

== Schedule ==
This was the complete schedule of events on the 2018 calendar, with player progression documented from the quarterfinals stage.

=== January ===
Week of	Tournament	Champions	Runners-up	Semifinalists	Quarterfinalists
January 1	BNP Paribas de Nouvelle-Calédonie; Nouméa, New Caledonia; Hard – $75,000+H – 32S/32Q/16D; Singles – Doubles	(United States) Noah Rubin; 7–5, 6–4	(United States) Taylor Fritz	(France) Gleb Sakharov (France) Kenny de Schepper	(France) Corentin Moutet (Norway) Casper Ruud (United Kingdom) Cameron Norrie (Germany) Tim Pütz
January 1	BNP Paribas de Nouvelle-Calédonie; Nouméa, New Caledonia; Hard – $75,000+H – 32S/32Q/16D; Singles – Doubles	(France) Hugo Nys (Germany) Tim Pütz; 6–2, 6–2	(Colombia) Alejandro González (Spain) Jaume Munar	(France) Gleb Sakharov (France) Kenny de Schepper	(France) Corentin Moutet (Norway) Casper Ruud (United Kingdom) Cameron Norrie (Germany) Tim Pütz
January 1	City of Playford Tennis International; Playford, Australia; Hard – $75,000 – 32S/32Q/16D; Singles – Doubles	(Australia) Jason Kubler; 6–4, 6–2	(Canada) Brayden Schnur	(United States) Evan King (United States) Reilly Opelka	(Australia) Marinko Matosevic (Slovakia) Norbert Gombos (Australia) Omar Jasika (Australia) Alex Bolt
January 1	City of Playford Tennis International; Playford, Australia; Hard – $75,000 – 32S/32Q/16D; Singles – Doubles	(United States) Mackenzie McDonald (United States) Tommy Paul; 7–6^{(7–4)}, 6–4	(Australia) Maverick Banes (Australia) Jason Kubler	(United States) Evan King (United States) Reilly Opelka	(Australia) Marinko Matosevic (Slovakia) Norbert Gombos (Australia) Omar Jasika (Australia) Alex Bolt
January 1	Bangkok Challenger; Bangkok, Thailand; Hard – $50,000+H – 32S/32Q/16D; Singles – Doubles	(Spain) Marcel Granollers; 4–6, 6–3, 7–5	(Germany) Mats Moraing	(Slovenia) Blaž Rola (Kazakhstan) Aleksandr Nedovyesov	(South Korea) Lee Duck-hee (Russia) Evgeny Karlovskiy (Czech Republic) Zdeněk Kolář (China) Zhang Ze
January 1	Bangkok Challenger; Bangkok, Thailand; Hard – $50,000+H – 32S/32Q/16D; Singles – Doubles	(Spain) Gerard Granollers (Spain) Marcel Granollers; 6–3, 7–6^{(8–6)}	(Czech Republic) Zdeněk Kolář (Portugal) Gonçalo Oliveira	(Slovenia) Blaž Rola (Kazakhstan) Aleksandr Nedovyesov	(South Korea) Lee Duck-hee (Russia) Evgeny Karlovskiy (Czech Republic) Zdeněk Kolář (China) Zhang Ze
January 8	Canberra Challenger; Canberra, Australia; Hard – $75,000 – 32S/32Q/16D; Singles – Doubles	(Italy) Andreas Seppi; 5–7, 6–4, 6–3	(Hungary) Márton Fucsovics	(France) Maxime Janvier (Dominican Republic) Víctor Estrella Burgos	(France) Hugo Grenier (France) Elliot Benchetrit (Spain) Guillermo García López (Germany) Florian Mayer
January 8	Canberra Challenger; Canberra, Australia; Hard – $75,000 – 32S/32Q/16D; Singles – Doubles	(Israel) Jonathan Erlich (India) Divij Sharan; 7–6^{(7–1)}, 6–2	(Chile) Hans Podlipnik Castillo (Belarus) Andrei Vasilevski	(France) Maxime Janvier (Dominican Republic) Víctor Estrella Burgos	(France) Hugo Grenier (France) Elliot Benchetrit (Spain) Guillermo García López (Germany) Florian Mayer
January 8	Bangkok Challenger II; Bangkok, Thailand; Hard – $50,000+H – 32S/32Q/16D; Singles – Doubles	(Spain) Marcel Granollers; 4–6, 6–2, 6–0	(Spain) Enrique López Pérez	(Spain) Bernabé Zapata Miralles (Germany) Mats Moraing	(Japan) Yusuke Takahashi (Russia) Evgeny Karlovskiy (Spain) Pedro Martínez (Italy) Matteo Viola
January 8	Bangkok Challenger II; Bangkok, Thailand; Hard – $50,000+H – 32S/32Q/16D; Singles – Doubles	(United States) James Cerretani (United Kingdom) Joe Salisbury; 6–7^{(5–7)}, 6–3, [10–8]	(Spain) Enrique López Pérez (Spain) Pedro Martínez	(Spain) Bernabé Zapata Miralles (Germany) Mats Moraing	(Japan) Yusuke Takahashi (Russia) Evgeny Karlovskiy (Spain) Pedro Martínez (Italy) Matteo Viola
January 15	Koblenz Open; Koblenz, Germany; Hard (i) – €43,000+H – 32S/32Q/16D; Singles – Doubles	(Germany) Mats Moraing; 6–2, 6–1	(France) Kenny de Schepper	(Belarus) Ilya Ivashka (Ukraine) Sergiy Stakhovsky	(Germany) Yannick Maden (Russia) Alexey Vatutin (Egypt) Mohamed Safwat (Japan) Yasutaka Uchiyama
January 15	Koblenz Open; Koblenz, Germany; Hard (i) – €43,000+H – 32S/32Q/16D; Singles – Doubles	(Monaco) Romain Arneodo (Austria) Tristan-Samuel Weissborn; 6–7^{(4–7)}, 7–5, [10–6]	(Netherlands) Sander Arends (Croatia) Antonio Šančić	(Belarus) Ilya Ivashka (Ukraine) Sergiy Stakhovsky	(Germany) Yannick Maden (Russia) Alexey Vatutin (Egypt) Mohamed Safwat (Japan) Yasutaka Uchiyama
January 22	Oracle Challenger Series – Newport Beach; Newport Beach, United States; Hard – $150,000+H – 32S/32Q/16D; Singles – Doubles	(United States) Taylor Fritz; 3–6, 7–5, 6–0	(United States) Bradley Klahn	(United States) Reilly Opelka (Chile) Cristian Garín	(Germany) Matthias Bachinger (United States) Noah Rubin (Barbados) Darian King (Serbia) Miomir Kecmanović
January 22	Oracle Challenger Series – Newport Beach; Newport Beach, United States; Hard – $150,000+H – 32S/32Q/16D; Singles – Doubles	(United States) James Cerretani (India) Leander Paes; 6–4, 7–5	(Philippines) Treat Huey (United States) Denis Kudla	(United States) Reilly Opelka (Chile) Cristian Garín	(Germany) Matthias Bachinger (United States) Noah Rubin (Barbados) Darian King (Serbia) Miomir Kecmanović
January 22	Open de Rennes; Rennes, France; Hard (i) – €64,000+H – 32S/32Q/16D; Singles – Doubles	(Canada) Vasek Pospisil; 6–1, 6–2	(Lithuania) Ričardas Berankis	(United Kingdom) Liam Broady (France) Antoine Hoang	(France) Gleb Sakharov (France) Manuel Guinard (Germany) Yannick Maden (France) Quentin Halys
January 22	Open de Rennes; Rennes, France; Hard (i) – €64,000+H – 32S/32Q/16D; Singles – Doubles	(Belgium) Sander Gillé (Belgium) Joran Vliegen; 6–3, 6–7^{(1–7)}, [10–7]	(Netherlands) Sander Arends (Croatia) Antonio Šančić	(United Kingdom) Liam Broady (France) Antoine Hoang	(France) Gleb Sakharov (France) Manuel Guinard (Germany) Yannick Maden (France) Quentin Halys
January 29	RBC Tennis Championships of Dallas; Dallas, United States; Hard (i) – $125,000 – 32S/32Q/16D; Singles – Doubles	(Japan) Kei Nishikori; 6–1, 6–4	(United States) Mackenzie McDonald	(Chinese Taipei) Jason Jung (United States) Denis Kudla	(Germany) Dominik Köpfer (Serbia) Miomir Kecmanović (United States) Taylor Fritz (United States) Tim Smyczek
January 29	RBC Tennis Championships of Dallas; Dallas, United States; Hard (i) – $125,000 – 32S/32Q/16D; Singles – Doubles	(India) Jeevan Nedunchezhiyan (Indonesia) Christopher Rungkat; 6–4, 3–6, [10–7]	(India) Leander Paes (United Kingdom) Joe Salisbury	(Chinese Taipei) Jason Jung (United States) Denis Kudla	(Germany) Dominik Köpfer (Serbia) Miomir Kecmanović (United States) Taylor Fritz (United States) Tim Smyczek
January 29	Burnie International; Burnie, Australia; Hard – $75,000 – 32S/32Q/16D; Singles – Doubles	(France) Stéphane Robert; 6–1, 6–2	(Germany) Daniel Altmaier	(Australia) Jason Kubler (Japan) Yoshihito Nishioka	(Spain) Marcel Granollers (Japan) Yusuke Takahashi (United States) Evan King (Australia) Andrew Whittington
January 29	Burnie International; Burnie, Australia; Hard – $75,000 – 32S/32Q/16D; Singles – Doubles	(Spain) Gerard Granollers (Spain) Marcel Granollers; 7–6^{(10–8)}, 6–2	(United States) Evan King (United States) Max Schnur	(Australia) Jason Kubler (Japan) Yoshihito Nishioka	(Spain) Marcel Granollers (Japan) Yusuke Takahashi (United States) Evan King (Australia) Andrew Whittington
January 29	Open BNP Paribas Banque de Bretagne; Quimper, France; Hard (i) – €43,000+H – 32S/32Q/16D; Singles – Doubles	(France) Quentin Halys; 6–3, 7–6^{(7–1)}	(Russia) Alexey Vatutin	(Greece) Stefanos Tsitsipas (France) Calvin Hemery	(Italy) Stefano Napolitano (France) Maxime Janvier (France) Tristan Lamasine (Spain) Jaume Munar
January 29	Open BNP Paribas Banque de Bretagne; Quimper, France; Hard (i) – €43,000+H – 32S/32Q/16D; Singles – Doubles	(United Kingdom) Ken Skupski (United Kingdom) Neal Skupski; 6–3, 3–6, [10–7]	(Belgium) Sander Gillé (Belgium) Joran Vliegen	(Greece) Stefanos Tsitsipas (France) Calvin Hemery	(Italy) Stefano Napolitano (France) Maxime Janvier (France) Tristan Lamasine (Spain) Jaume Munar

=== February ===
Week of	Tournament	Champions	Runners-up	Semifinalists	Quarterfinalists
February 5	Kunal Patel San Francisco Open; San Francisco, United States; Hard (i) – $100,000 – 32S/32Q/16D; Singles – Doubles	(Chinese Taipei) Jason Jung; 6–4, 2–6, 7–6^{(7–5)}	(Germany) Dominik Köpfer	(United States) Dennis Novikov (Serbia) Miomir Kecmanović	(Canada) Filip Peliwo (United States) Bradley Klahn (United States) Michael Mmoh (United States) Noah Rubin
February 5	Kunal Patel San Francisco Open; San Francisco, United States; Hard (i) – $100,000 – 32S/32Q/16D; Singles – Doubles	(El Salvador) Marcelo Arévalo (Venezuela) Roberto Maytín; 6–3, 6–7^{(5–7)}, [10–7]	(United Kingdom) Luke Bambridge (United Kingdom) Joe Salisbury	(United States) Dennis Novikov (Serbia) Miomir Kecmanović	(Canada) Filip Peliwo (United States) Bradley Klahn (United States) Michael Mmoh (United States) Noah Rubin
February 5	Launceston Tennis International; Launceston, Australia; Hard – $75,000 – 32S/32Q/16D; Singles – Doubles	(Australia) Marc Polmans; 6–2, 6–2	(Australia) Bradley Mousley	(Spain) Marcel Granollers (Australia) Andrew Harris	(United States) Alexander Sarkissian (United States) Kevin King (Australia) Jason Kubler (Australia) Dayne Kelly
February 5	Launceston Tennis International; Launceston, Australia; Hard – $75,000 – 32S/32Q/16D; Singles – Doubles	(Australia) Alex Bolt (Australia) Bradley Mousley; 7–6^{(8–6)}, 6–0	(United States) Sekou Bangoura (United States) Nathan Pasha	(Spain) Marcel Granollers (Australia) Andrew Harris	(United States) Alexander Sarkissian (United States) Kevin King (Australia) Jason Kubler (Australia) Dayne Kelly
February 5	Hungarian Challenger Open; Budapest, Hungary; Hard (i) – €64,000 – 32S/32Q/16D; Singles – Doubles	(Canada) Vasek Pospisil; 7–6^{(7–3)}, 3–6, 6–3	(Spain) Nicola Kuhn	(Hungary) Márton Fucsovics (Serbia) Nikola Milojević	(Germany) Kevin Krawietz (Estonia) Jürgen Zopp (Sweden) Elias Ymer (France) Constant Lestienne
February 5	Hungarian Challenger Open; Budapest, Hungary; Hard (i) – €64,000 – 32S/32Q/16D; Singles – Doubles	(Canada) Félix Auger-Aliassime (Spain) Nicola Kuhn; 2–6, 6–2, [11–9]	(Croatia) Marin Draganja (Croatia) Tomislav Draganja	(Hungary) Márton Fucsovics (Serbia) Nikola Milojević	(Germany) Kevin Krawietz (Estonia) Jürgen Zopp (Sweden) Elias Ymer (France) Constant Lestienne
February 12	Challenger La Manche; Cherbourg, France; Hard (i) – €43,000+H – 32S/32Q/16D; Singles – Doubles	(Germany) Maximilian Marterer; 6–4, 7–5	(France) Constant Lestienne	(Germany) Mats Moraing (Italy) Matteo Berrettini	(Sweden) Mikael Ymer (Germany) Tobias Kamke (France) Kenny de Schepper (Australia) Alexei Popyrin
February 12	Challenger La Manche; Cherbourg, France; Hard (i) – €43,000+H – 32S/32Q/16D; Singles – Doubles	(Monaco) Romain Arneodo (Austria) Tristan-Samuel Weissborn; 6–3, 1–6, [10–4]	(Croatia) Antonio Šančić (United Kingdom) Ken Skupski	(Germany) Mats Moraing (Italy) Matteo Berrettini	(Sweden) Mikael Ymer (Germany) Tobias Kamke (France) Kenny de Schepper (Australia) Alexei Popyrin
February 12	Chennai Open Challenger; Chennai, India; Hard – $50,000+H – 32S/32Q/16D; Singles – Doubles	(Australia) Jordan Thompson; 7–5, 3–6, 7–5	(India) Yuki Bhambri	(Spain) Pedro Martínez (South Korea) Lee Duck-hee	(Serbia) Danilo Petrović (Egypt) Mohamed Safwat (France) Antoine Escoffier (Japan) Yasutaka Uchiyama
February 12	Chennai Open Challenger; Chennai, India; Hard – $50,000+H – 32S/32Q/16D; Singles – Doubles	(India) Sriram Balaji (India) Vishnu Vardhan; 7–6^{(7–5)}, 5–7, [10–5]	(Turkey) Cem İlkel (Serbia) Danilo Petrović	(Spain) Pedro Martínez (South Korea) Lee Duck-hee	(Serbia) Danilo Petrović (Egypt) Mohamed Safwat (France) Antoine Escoffier (Japan) Yasutaka Uchiyama
February 19	Trofeo Faip–Perrel; Bergamo, Italy; Hard (i) – €64,000+H – 32S/32Q/16D; Singles – Doubles	(Italy) Matteo Berrettini; 6–2, 3–6, 6–2	(Italy) Stefano Napolitano	(Estonia) Jürgen Zopp (Italy) Lorenzo Sonego	(Italy) Salvatore Caruso (Czech Republic) Adam Pavlásek (Egypt) Mohamed Safwat (Italy) Andrea Arnaboldi
February 19	Trofeo Faip–Perrel; Bergamo, Italy; Hard (i) – €64,000+H – 32S/32Q/16D; Singles – Doubles	(United Kingdom) Scott Clayton (United Kingdom) Jonny O'Mara; 5–7, 6–3, [15–13]	(Lithuania) Laurynas Grigelis (Italy) Alessandro Motti	(Estonia) Jürgen Zopp (Italy) Lorenzo Sonego	(Italy) Salvatore Caruso (Czech Republic) Adam Pavlásek (Egypt) Mohamed Safwat (Italy) Andrea Arnaboldi
February 19	Shimadzu All Japan Indoor Tennis Championships; Kyoto, Japan; Carpet (i) – $50,000+H – 32S/32Q/16D; Singles – Doubles	(Australia) John Millman; 7–5, 6–1	(Australia) Jordan Thompson	(Australia) Blake Ellis (Germany) Tim Pütz	(Poland) Hubert Hurkacz (Japan) Go Soeda (Germany) Tobias Kamke (Japan) Kaichi Uchida
February 19	Shimadzu All Japan Indoor Tennis Championships; Kyoto, Japan; Carpet (i) – $50,000+H – 32S/32Q/16D; Singles – Doubles	(Australia) Luke Saville (Australia) Jordan Thompson; 6–3, 5–7, [10–6]	(Japan) Go Soeda (Japan) Yasutaka Uchiyama	(Australia) Blake Ellis (Germany) Tim Pütz	(Poland) Hubert Hurkacz (Japan) Go Soeda (Germany) Tobias Kamke (Japan) Kaichi Uchida
February 19	Morelos Open; Cuernavaca, Mexico; Hard – $50,000+H – 32S/32Q/16D; Singles – Doubles	(United States) Dennis Novikov; 6–4, 6–3	(Chile) Cristian Garín	(Australia) Thanasi Kokkinakis (Serbia) Peđa Krstin	(Slovakia) Andrej Martin (Kazakhstan) Dmitry Popko (United States) Alexander Sarkissian (United States) Kevin King
February 19	Morelos Open; Cuernavaca, Mexico; Hard – $50,000+H – 32S/32Q/16D; Singles – Doubles	(Venezuela) Roberto Maytín (Brazil) Fernando Romboli; 7–5, 6–3	(United States) Evan King (United States) Nathan Pasha	(Australia) Thanasi Kokkinakis (Serbia) Peđa Krstin	(Slovakia) Andrej Martin (Kazakhstan) Dmitry Popko (United States) Alexander Sarkissian (United States) Kevin King
February 26	Oracle Challenger Series – Indian Wells; Indian Wells, United States; Hard – $150,000+H – 32S/32Q/16D; Singles – Doubles	(Slovakia) Martin Kližan; 6–3, 6–3	(Barbados) Darian King	(United States) Taylor Fritz (Canada) Vasek Pospisil	(Romania) Marius Copil (Israel) Dudi Sela (United States) Christian Harrison (Canada) Peter Polansky
February 26	Oracle Challenger Series – Indian Wells; Indian Wells, United States; Hard – $150,000+H – 32S/32Q/16D; Singles – Doubles	(United States) Austin Krajicek (United States) Jackson Withrow; 6–7^{(3–7)}, 6–1, [11–9]	(United States) Evan King (United States) Nathan Pasha	(United States) Taylor Fritz (Canada) Vasek Pospisil	(Romania) Marius Copil (Israel) Dudi Sela (United States) Christian Harrison (Canada) Peter Polansky
February 26	Keio Challenger; Yokohama, Japan; Hard – $75,000 – 32S/32Q/16D; Singles – Doubles	(Japan) Yasutaka Uchiyama; 2–6, 6–3, 6–4	(Japan) Tatsuma Ito	(Australia) Jordan Thompson (Turkey) Cem İlkel	(France) Stéphane Robert (Japan) Go Soeda (Germany) Tobias Kamke (Japan) Hiroki Moriya
February 26	Keio Challenger; Yokohama, Japan; Hard – $75,000 – 32S/32Q/16D; Singles – Doubles	(Germany) Tobias Kamke (Germany) Tim Pütz; 3–6, 7–5, [12–10]	(Thailand) Sanchai Ratiwatana (Thailand) Sonchat Ratiwatana	(Australia) Jordan Thompson (Turkey) Cem İlkel	(France) Stéphane Robert (Japan) Go Soeda (Germany) Tobias Kamke (Japan) Hiroki Moriya
February 26	Punta Open; Punta del Este, Uruguay; Clay – $50,000+H – 32S/32Q/16D; Singles – Doubles	(Argentina) Guido Andreozzi; 3–6, 6–4, 6–3	(Italy) Simone Bolelli	(Italy) Alessandro Giannessi (Kazakhstan) Dmitry Popko	(Italy) Federico Gaio (Slovakia) Jozef Kovalík (Chile) Cristian Garín (Spain) Enrique López Pérez
February 26	Punta Open; Punta del Este, Uruguay; Clay – $50,000+H – 32S/32Q/16D; Singles – Doubles	(Argentina) Facundo Bagnis (Uruguay) Ariel Behar; 6–2, 7–6^{(9–7)}	(Italy) Simone Bolelli (Italy) Alessandro Giannessi	(Italy) Alessandro Giannessi (Kazakhstan) Dmitry Popko	(Italy) Federico Gaio (Slovakia) Jozef Kovalík (Chile) Cristian Garín (Spain) Enrique López Pérez

=== March ===
Week of	Tournament	Champions	Runners-up	Semifinalists	Quarterfinalists
March 5	Zhuhai Open; Zhuhai, China; Hard – $75,000 – 32S/32Q/16D; Singles – Doubles	(Australia) Alex Bolt; 5–7, 7–6^{(7–4)}, 6–2	(Poland) Hubert Hurkacz	(Chinese Taipei) Jason Jung (Germany) Oscar Otte	(Germany) Mats Moraing (South Korea) Kwon Soon-woo (Australia) Jason Kubler (Tunisia) Malek Jaziri
March 5	Zhuhai Open; Zhuhai, China; Hard – $75,000 – 32S/32Q/16D; Singles – Doubles	(Ukraine) Denys Molchanov (Slovakia) Igor Zelenay; 7–5, 7–6^{(7–4)}	(Belarus) Aliaksandr Bury (Chinese Taipei) Peng Hsien-yin	(Chinese Taipei) Jason Jung (Germany) Oscar Otte	(Germany) Mats Moraing (South Korea) Kwon Soon-woo (Australia) Jason Kubler (Tunisia) Malek Jaziri
March 5	Challenger ATP Cachantún Cup; Santiago, Chile; Clay – $50,000+H – 32S/32Q/16D; Singles – Doubles	(Italy) Marco Cecchinato; 1–6, 6–1, 6–1	(Spain) Carlos Gómez-Herrera	(Slovakia) Jozef Kovalík (Spain) Tommy Robredo	(Brazil) Thomaz Bellucci (Brazil) Rogério Dutra Silva (Italy) Gian Marco Moroni (Argentina) Guido Andreozzi
March 5	Challenger ATP Cachantún Cup; Santiago, Chile; Clay – $50,000+H – 32S/32Q/16D; Singles – Doubles	(Monaco) Romain Arneodo (France) Jonathan Eysseric; 7–6^{(7–4)}, 1–6, [12–10]	(Argentina) Guido Andreozzi (Argentina) Guillermo Durán	(Slovakia) Jozef Kovalík (Spain) Tommy Robredo	(Brazil) Thomaz Bellucci (Brazil) Rogério Dutra Silva (Italy) Gian Marco Moroni (Argentina) Guido Andreozzi
March 12	Irving Tennis Classic; Irving, United States; Hard – $150,000+H – 32S/32Q/16D; Singles – Doubles	(Kazakhstan) Mikhail Kukushkin; 6–2, 3–6, 6–1	(Italy) Matteo Berrettini	(Hungary) Márton Fucsovics (United States) Steve Johnson	(Bosnia and Herzegovina) Mirza Bašić (Cyprus) Petros Chrysochos (Australia) Alex de Minaur (United States) Bjorn Fratangelo
March 12	Irving Tennis Classic; Irving, United States; Hard – $150,000+H – 32S/32Q/16D; Singles – Doubles	(Germany) Philipp Petzschner (Austria) Alexander Peya; 6–2, 6–4	(Moldova) Radu Albot (Australia) Matthew Ebden	(Hungary) Márton Fucsovics (United States) Steve Johnson	(Bosnia and Herzegovina) Mirza Bašić (Cyprus) Petros Chrysochos (Australia) Alex de Minaur (United States) Bjorn Fratangelo
March 12	Pingshan Open; Shenzhen, China; Hard – $75,000+H – 32S/32Q/16D; Singles – Doubles	(Belarus) Ilya Ivashka; 6–4, 6–2	(China) Zhang Ze	(Poland) Hubert Hurkacz (Japan) Tatsuma Ito	(Tunisia) Malek Jaziri (Croatia) Viktor Galović (Estonia) Jürgen Zopp (Italy) Salvatore Caruso
March 12	Pingshan Open; Shenzhen, China; Hard – $75,000+H – 32S/32Q/16D; Singles – Doubles	(Chinese Taipei) Hsieh Cheng-peng (Australia) Rameez Junaid; 7–6^{(7–3)}, 6–3	(Ukraine) Denys Molchanov (Slovakia) Igor Zelenay	(Poland) Hubert Hurkacz (Japan) Tatsuma Ito	(Tunisia) Malek Jaziri (Croatia) Viktor Galović (Estonia) Jürgen Zopp (Italy) Salvatore Caruso
March 12	Challenger Banque Nationale de Drummondville; Drummondville, Canada; Hard (i) – $75,000 – 32S/32Q/16D; Singles – Doubles	(United States) Denis Kudla; 6–0, 7–5	(France) Benjamin Bonzi	(Canada) Vasek Pospisil (Canada) Brayden Schnur	(United States) Evan King (United States) JC Aragone (Canada) Frank Dancevic (United States) Jared Hiltzik
March 12	Challenger Banque Nationale de Drummondville; Drummondville, Canada; Hard (i) – $75,000 – 32S/32Q/16D; Singles – Doubles	(Belgium) Joris De Loore (Denmark) Frederik Nielsen; 6–4, 6–3	(Venezuela) Luis David Martínez (Canada) Filip Peliwo	(Canada) Vasek Pospisil (Canada) Brayden Schnur	(United States) Evan King (United States) JC Aragone (Canada) Frank Dancevic (United States) Jared Hiltzik
March 19	Play In Challenger; Lille, France; Hard (i) – €43,000+H – 32S/32Q/16D; Singles – Doubles	(France) Grégoire Barrère; 6–1, 6–4	(Germany) Tobias Kamke	(Germany) Yannick Maden (France) Maxime Janvier	(Spain) Guillermo Olaso (France) David Guez (France) Antoine Hoang (France) Hugo Grenier
March 19	Play In Challenger; Lille, France; Hard (i) – €43,000+H – 32S/32Q/16D; Singles – Doubles	(France) Hugo Nys (Germany) Tim Pütz; 7–6^{(7–3)}, 1–6, [10–7]	(India) Jeevan Nedunchezhiyan (India) Purav Raja	(Germany) Yannick Maden (France) Maxime Janvier	(Spain) Guillermo Olaso (France) David Guez (France) Antoine Hoang (France) Hugo Grenier
March 19	Qujing International Challenger; Qujing, China; Hard – $75,000 – 32S/32Q/16D; Singles – Doubles	(Tunisia) Malek Jaziri; 7–6^{(7–5)}, 6–1	(Slovenia) Blaž Rola	(Australia) Jason Kubler (Australia) Alex Bolt	(Italy) Andrea Pellegrino (Italy) Lorenzo Sonego (Belarus) Ilya Ivashka (Poland) Hubert Hurkacz
March 19	Qujing International Challenger; Qujing, China; Hard – $75,000 – 32S/32Q/16D; Singles – Doubles	(Belarus) Aliaksandr Bury (Chinese Taipei) Peng Hsien-yin; 6–7^{(3–7)}, 6–4, [12–10]	(China) Wu Di (China) Zhang Ze	(Australia) Jason Kubler (Australia) Alex Bolt	(Italy) Andrea Pellegrino (Italy) Lorenzo Sonego (Belarus) Ilya Ivashka (Poland) Hubert Hurkacz
March 26	Open de Guadeloupe; Le Gosier, Guadeloupe; Hard – €85,000+H – 32S/32Q/16D; Singles – Doubles	(Serbia) Dušan Lajović; 6–4, 6–0	(United States) Denis Kudla	(Chile) Cristian Garín (Belgium) Ruben Bemelmans	(Australia) John-Patrick Smith (United States) Bradley Klahn (France) Calvin Hemery (Canada) Filip Peliwo
March 26	Open de Guadeloupe; Le Gosier, Guadeloupe; Hard – €85,000+H – 32S/32Q/16D; Singles – Doubles	(United Kingdom) Neal Skupski (Australia) John-Patrick Smith; 7–6^{(7–3)}, 6–4	(Belgium) Ruben Bemelmans (France) Jonathan Eysseric	(Chile) Cristian Garín (Belgium) Ruben Bemelmans	(Australia) John-Patrick Smith (United States) Bradley Klahn (France) Calvin Hemery (Canada) Filip Peliwo
March 26	Casino Admiral Trophy; Marbella, Spain; Clay – €43,000+H – 32S/32Q/16D; Singles – Doubles	(Italy) Stefano Travaglia; 6–3, 6–3	(Argentina) Guido Andreozzi	(Slovakia) Martin Kližan (Italy) Marco Cecchinato	(Belgium) Kimmer Coppejans (Argentina) Marco Trungelliti (India) Ramkumar Ramanathan (Italy) Simone Bolelli
March 26	Casino Admiral Trophy; Marbella, Spain; Clay – €43,000+H – 32S/32Q/16D; Singles – Doubles	(Argentina) Guido Andreozzi (Uruguay) Ariel Behar; 6–3, 6–4	(Slovakia) Martin Kližan (Slovakia) Jozef Kovalík	(Slovakia) Martin Kližan (Italy) Marco Cecchinato	(Belgium) Kimmer Coppejans (Argentina) Marco Trungelliti (India) Ramkumar Ramanathan (Italy) Simone Bolelli
March 26	San Luis Open Challenger Tour; San Luis Potosí, Mexico; Clay – $50,000+H – 32S/32Q/16D; Singles – Doubles	(El Salvador) Marcelo Arévalo; 6–3, 6–7^{(3–7)}, 6–4	(Dominican Republic) Roberto Cid Subervi	(Brazil) Pedro Sakamoto (Colombia) Daniel Elahi Galán	(Dominican Republic) José Hernández-Fernández (United Kingdom) Jay Clarke (Ecuador) Gonzalo Escobar (Germany) Jan Choinski
March 26	San Luis Open Challenger Tour; San Luis Potosí, Mexico; Clay – $50,000+H – 32S/32Q/16D; Singles – Doubles	(El Salvador) Marcelo Arévalo (Mexico) Miguel Ángel Reyes-Varela; 6–1, 6–4	(United Kingdom) Jay Clarke (Germany) Kevin Krawietz	(Brazil) Pedro Sakamoto (Colombia) Daniel Elahi Galán	(Dominican Republic) José Hernández-Fernández (United Kingdom) Jay Clarke (Ecuador) Gonzalo Escobar (Germany) Jan Choinski
March 26	Open Harmonie mutuelle Saint-Brieuc, France; Hard (i) – €43,000+H – 32S/32Q/16D; Singles – Doubles	(Lithuania) Ričardas Berankis; 6–2, 5–7, 6–4	(France) Constant Lestienne	(Cyprus) Marcos Baghdatis (Estonia) Jürgen Zopp	(Germany) Matthias Bachinger (Germany) Tobias Kamke (Czech Republic) Zdeněk Kolář (Austria) Dennis Novak
March 26	Open Harmonie mutuelle Saint-Brieuc, France; Hard (i) – €43,000+H – 32S/32Q/16D; Singles – Doubles	(Netherlands) Sander Arends (Austria) Tristan-Samuel Weissborn; 4–6, 6–1, [10–7]	(United Kingdom) Luke Bambridge (United Kingdom) Joe Salisbury	(Cyprus) Marcos Baghdatis (Estonia) Jürgen Zopp	(Germany) Matthias Bachinger (Germany) Tobias Kamke (Czech Republic) Zdeněk Kolář (Austria) Dennis Novak

=== April ===
Week of	Tournament	Champions	Runners-up	Semifinalists	Quarterfinalists
April 2	JC Ferrero Challenger Open; Alicante, Spain; Clay – €43,000+H – 32S/32Q/16D; Singles – Doubles	(Spain) Pablo Andújar; 7–6^{(7–5)}, 6–1	(Australia) Alex de Minaur	(Spain) Roberto Carballés Baena (Italy) Marco Cecchinato	(Spain) Mario Vilella Martínez (Spain) Marcel Granollers (Argentina) Guido Andreozzi (Italy) Gian Marco Moroni
April 2	JC Ferrero Challenger Open; Alicante, Spain; Clay – €43,000+H – 32S/32Q/16D; Singles – Doubles	(Netherlands) Wesley Koolhof (New Zealand) Artem Sitak; 6–3, 6–2	(Argentina) Guido Andreozzi (Uruguay) Ariel Behar	(Spain) Roberto Carballés Baena (Italy) Marco Cecchinato	(Spain) Mario Vilella Martínez (Spain) Marcel Granollers (Argentina) Guido Andreozzi (Italy) Gian Marco Moroni
April 2	Visit Panamá Cup; Panama City, Panama; Clay – $50,000+H – 32S/32Q/16D; Singles – Doubles	(Argentina) Carlos Berlocq; 6–2, 6–0	(Slovenia) Blaž Rola	(Argentina) Juan Ignacio Londero (Argentina) Andrea Collarini	(Germany) Jan Choinski (Dominican Republic) José Hernández-Fernández (Germany) Yannick Hanfmann (Colombia) Cristian Rodríguez
April 2	Visit Panamá Cup; Panama City, Panama; Clay – $50,000+H – 32S/32Q/16D; Singles – Doubles	(Germany) Yannick Hanfmann (Germany) Kevin Krawietz; 7–6^{(7–4)}, 6–4	(United States) Nathan Pasha (Ecuador) Roberto Quiroz	(Argentina) Juan Ignacio Londero (Argentina) Andrea Collarini	(Germany) Jan Choinski (Dominican Republic) José Hernández-Fernández (Germany) Yannick Hanfmann (Colombia) Cristian Rodríguez
April 9	Santaizi ATP Challenger; Taipei, Taiwan; Carpet (i) – $150,000+H – 32S/32Q/16D; Singles – Doubles	(India) Yuki Bhambri; 6–3, 6–4	(India) Ramkumar Ramanathan	(Japan) Tatsuma Ito (Japan) Go Soeda	(Chinese Taipei) Jason Jung (Chinese Taipei) Lo Chien-hsun (Israel) Dudi Sela (Russia) Evgeny Donskoy
April 9	Santaizi ATP Challenger; Taipei, Taiwan; Carpet (i) – $150,000+H – 32S/32Q/16D; Singles – Doubles	(Australia) Matthew Ebden (Australia) Andrew Whittington; 6–4, 5–7, [10–6]	(India) Prajnesh Gunneswaran (India) Saketh Myneni	(Japan) Tatsuma Ito (Japan) Go Soeda	(Chinese Taipei) Jason Jung (Chinese Taipei) Lo Chien-hsun (Israel) Dudi Sela (Russia) Evgeny Donskoy
April 9	CDMX Open; Mexico City, Mexico; Clay – $100,000+H – 32S/32Q/16D; Singles – Doubles	(Argentina) Juan Ignacio Londero; 6–1, 6–3	(Ecuador) Roberto Quiroz	(Argentina) Facundo Argüello (Colombia) Daniel Elahi Galán	(Italy) Andrea Basso (Germany) Jan Choinski (Spain) Adrián Menéndez Maceiras (Dominican Republic) José Hernández-Fernández
April 9	CDMX Open; Mexico City, Mexico; Clay – $100,000+H – 32S/32Q/16D; Singles – Doubles	(Germany) Yannick Hanfmann (Germany) Kevin Krawietz; 6–2, 7–6^{(7–3)}	(United Kingdom) Luke Bambridge (United Kingdom) Jonny O'Mara	(Argentina) Facundo Argüello (Colombia) Daniel Elahi Galán	(Italy) Andrea Basso (Germany) Jan Choinski (Spain) Adrián Menéndez Maceiras (Dominican Republic) José Hernández-Fernández
April 9	Open Città della Disfida; Barletta, Italy; Clay – €43,000+H – 32S/32Q/16D; Singles – Doubles	(Argentina) Marco Trungelliti; 2–6, 7–6^{(7–4)}, 6–4	(Italy) Simone Bolelli	(Spain) Jaume Munar (Italy) Gian Marco Moroni	(Italy) Matteo Donati (Portugal) Gonçalo Oliveira (Spain) Daniel Gimeno Traver (Croatia) Viktor Galović
April 9	Open Città della Disfida; Barletta, Italy; Clay – €43,000+H – 32S/32Q/16D; Singles – Doubles	(Ukraine) Denys Molchanov (Slovakia) Igor Zelenay; 6–1, 6–2	(Uruguay) Ariel Behar (Argentina) Máximo González	(Spain) Jaume Munar (Italy) Gian Marco Moroni	(Italy) Matteo Donati (Portugal) Gonçalo Oliveira (Spain) Daniel Gimeno Traver (Croatia) Viktor Galović
April 16	Sarasota Open; Sarasota, United States; Clay – $100,000 – 32S/32Q/16D; Singles – Doubles	(Bolivia) Hugo Dellien; 2–6, 6–4, 6–2	(Argentina) Facundo Bagnis	(United States) Reilly Opelka (Argentina) Juan Ignacio Londero	(Brazil) Guilherme Clezar (United Kingdom) Jay Clarke (United States) Stefan Kozlov (Switzerland) Henri Laaksonen
April 16	Sarasota Open; Sarasota, United States; Clay – $100,000 – 32S/32Q/16D; Singles – Doubles	(United States) Evan King (United States) Hunter Reese; 6–1, 6–2	(United States) Christian Harrison (Canada) Peter Polansky	(United States) Reilly Opelka (Argentina) Juan Ignacio Londero	(Brazil) Guilherme Clezar (United Kingdom) Jay Clarke (United States) Stefan Kozlov (Switzerland) Henri Laaksonen
April 16	Jalisco Open; Guadalajara, Mexico; Hard – $50,000+H – 32S/32Q/16D; Singles – Doubles	(El Salvador) Marcelo Arévalo; 6–4, 5–7, 7–6^{(7–4)}	(United States) Christopher Eubanks	(Serbia) Peđa Krstin (Canada) Brayden Schnur	(Serbia) Danilo Petrović (Barbados) Darian King (Australia) John-Patrick Smith (Germany) Mats Moraing
April 16	Jalisco Open; Guadalajara, Mexico; Hard – $50,000+H – 32S/32Q/16D; Singles – Doubles	(El Salvador) Marcelo Arévalo (Mexico) Miguel Ángel Reyes-Varela; 7–6^{(7–3)}, 7–5	(United Kingdom) Brydan Klein (South Africa) Ruan Roelofse	(Serbia) Peđa Krstin (Canada) Brayden Schnur	(Serbia) Danilo Petrović (Barbados) Darian King (Australia) John-Patrick Smith (Germany) Mats Moraing
April 16	ATP Challenger China International – Nanchang; Nanchang, China; Clay (i) – $50,000+H – 32S/32Q/16D; Singles – Doubles	(France) Quentin Halys; 6–3, 6–2	(France) Calvin Hemery	(Kazakhstan) Aleksandr Nedovyesov (Australia) Jordan Thompson	(Russia) Evgeny Donskoy (India) Ramkumar Ramanathan (India) Prajnesh Gunneswaran (Spain) Roberto Ortega Olmedo
April 16	ATP Challenger China International – Nanchang; Nanchang, China; Clay (i) – $50,000+H – 32S/32Q/16D; Singles – Doubles	(China) Gong Maoxin (China) Zhang Ze; 3–6, 7–6^{(9–7)}, [10–7]	(Philippines) Ruben Gonzales (Indonesia) Christopher Rungkat	(Kazakhstan) Aleksandr Nedovyesov (Australia) Jordan Thompson	(Russia) Evgeny Donskoy (India) Ramkumar Ramanathan (India) Prajnesh Gunneswaran (Spain) Roberto Ortega Olmedo
April 16	Tunis Open; Tunis, Tunisia; Clay – $75,000+H – 32S/32Q/16D; Singles – Doubles	(Argentina) Guido Andreozzi; 6–2, 3–0 ret.	(Spain) Daniel Gimeno Traver	(Italy) Thomas Fabbiano (Portugal) João Domingues	(France) Corentin Moutet (Czech Republic) Lukáš Rosol (Portugal) Pedro Sousa (Georgia (country)) Nikoloz Basilashvili
April 16	Tunis Open; Tunis, Tunisia; Clay – $75,000+H – 32S/32Q/16D; Singles – Doubles	(Ukraine) Denys Molchanov (Slovakia) Igor Zelenay; 7–6^{(7–4)}, 6–2	(France) Jonathan Eysseric (United Kingdom) Joe Salisbury	(Italy) Thomas Fabbiano (Portugal) João Domingues	(France) Corentin Moutet (Czech Republic) Lukáš Rosol (Portugal) Pedro Sousa (Georgia (country)) Nikoloz Basilashvili
April 23	Kunming Open; Anning, China; Clay – $150,000+H – 32S/32Q/16D; Singles – Doubles	(India) Prajnesh Gunneswaran; 5–7, 6–3, 6–1	(Egypt) Mohamed Safwat	(Poland) Kamil Majchrzak (Australia) Jordan Thompson	(South Africa) Lloyd Harris (South Korea) Kwon Soon-woo (India) Sasikumar Mukund (China) Bai Yan
April 23	Kunming Open; Anning, China; Clay – $150,000+H – 32S/32Q/16D; Singles – Doubles	(Belarus) Aliaksandr Bury (South Africa) Lloyd Harris; 6–3, 6–4	(China) Gong Maoxin (China) Zhang Ze	(Poland) Kamil Majchrzak (Australia) Jordan Thompson	(South Africa) Lloyd Harris (South Korea) Kwon Soon-woo (India) Sasikumar Mukund (China) Bai Yan
April 23	Torneo Internacional Challenger León; León, Mexico; Hard – $75,000+H – 32S/32Q/16D; Singles – Doubles	(United States) Christopher Eubanks; 6–4, 3–6, 7–6^{(7–4)}	(Australia) John-Patrick Smith	(Colombia) Alejandro González (Ecuador) Roberto Quiroz	(Canada) Filip Peliwo (Croatia) Ante Pavić (Dominican Republic) Roberto Cid Subervi (United States) Alexander Sarkissian
April 23	Torneo Internacional Challenger León; León, Mexico; Hard – $75,000+H – 32S/32Q/16D; Singles – Doubles	(Ecuador) Gonzalo Escobar (Mexico) Manuel Sánchez; 6–4, 6–4	(Australia) Bradley Mousley (Australia) John-Patrick Smith	(Colombia) Alejandro González (Ecuador) Roberto Quiroz	(Canada) Filip Peliwo (Croatia) Ante Pavić (Dominican Republic) Roberto Cid Subervi (United States) Alexander Sarkissian
April 23	Tallahassee Tennis Challenger; Tallahassee, United States; Clay – $75,000 – 32S/32Q/16D; Singles – Doubles	(United States) Noah Rubin; 6–2, 3–6, 6–4	(Australia) Marc Polmans	(Bolivia) Hugo Dellien (Australia) Max Purcell	(Chile) Cristian Garín (Brazil) Thomaz Bellucci (United States) Michael Mmoh (Argentina) Juan Ignacio Londero
April 23	Tallahassee Tennis Challenger; Tallahassee, United States; Clay – $75,000 – 32S/32Q/16D; Singles – Doubles	(United States) Robert Galloway (United States) Denis Kudla; 6–3, 6–1	(Spain) Enrique López Pérez (India) Jeevan Nedunchezhiyan	(Bolivia) Hugo Dellien (Australia) Max Purcell	(Chile) Cristian Garín (Brazil) Thomaz Bellucci (United States) Michael Mmoh (Argentina) Juan Ignacio Londero
April 23	Internazionali di Tennis d'Abruzzo; Francavilla al Mare, Italy; Clay – €43,000+H – 32S/32Q/16D; Singles – Doubles	(Italy) Gianluigi Quinzi; 6–4, 6–1	(Norway) Casper Ruud	(Netherlands) Tallon Griekspoor (France) Antoine Hoang	(Belgium) Kimmer Coppejans (Italy) Andrea Pellegrino (Italy) Matteo Donati (Italy) Filippo Baldi
April 23	Internazionali di Tennis d'Abruzzo; Francavilla al Mare, Italy; Clay – €43,000+H – 32S/32Q/16D; Singles – Doubles	(Italy) Julian Ocleppo (Italy) Andrea Vavassori; 7–6^{(7–5)}, 7–6^{(7–3)}	(Uruguay) Ariel Behar (Argentina) Máximo González	(Netherlands) Tallon Griekspoor (France) Antoine Hoang	(Belgium) Kimmer Coppejans (Italy) Andrea Pellegrino (Italy) Matteo Donati (Italy) Filippo Baldi
April 30	Seoul Open Challenger; Seoul, South Korea; Hard – $100,000+H – 32S/32Q/16D; Singles – Doubles	(United States) Mackenzie McDonald; 1–6, 6–4, 6–1	(Australia) Jordan Thompson	(Australia) Jason Kubler (Japan) Tatsuma Ito	(South Korea) Kwon Soon-woo (Chinese Taipei) Yang Tsung-hua (South Africa) Lloyd Harris (China) Wu Di
April 30	Seoul Open Challenger; Seoul, South Korea; Hard – $100,000+H – 32S/32Q/16D; Singles – Doubles	(Japan) Toshihide Matsui (Denmark) Frederik Nielsen; 6–4, 7–6^{(7–3)}	(Chinese Taipei) Chen Ti (Chinese Taipei) Yi Chu-huan	(Australia) Jason Kubler (Japan) Tatsuma Ito	(South Korea) Kwon Soon-woo (Chinese Taipei) Yang Tsung-hua (South Africa) Lloyd Harris (China) Wu Di
April 30	Glasgow Trophy; Glasgow, United Kingdom; Hard (i) – €85,000 – 32S/32Q/16D; Singles – Doubles	(Slovakia) Lukáš Lacko; 4–6, 7–6^{(7–3)}, 6–4	(Italy) Luca Vanni	(France) David Guez (Italy) Matteo Viola	(Spain) Guillermo Olaso (Germany) Daniel Brands (Finland) Harri Heliövaara (Spain) Roberto Ortega Olmedo
April 30	Glasgow Trophy; Glasgow, United Kingdom; Hard (i) – €85,000 – 32S/32Q/16D; Singles – Doubles	(Spain) Gerard Granollers (Spain) Guillermo Olaso; 6–1, 7–5	(United Kingdom) Scott Clayton (United Kingdom) Jonny O'Mara	(France) David Guez (Italy) Matteo Viola	(Spain) Guillermo Olaso (Germany) Daniel Brands (Finland) Harri Heliövaara (Spain) Roberto Ortega Olmedo
April 30	Prosperita Open; Ostrava, Czech Republic; Clay – €64,000+H – 32S/32Q/16D; Singles – Doubles	(Belgium) Arthur De Greef; 4–6, 6–4, 6–2	(Croatia) Nino Serdarušić	(France) Grégoire Barrère (Italy) Matteo Donati	(Bosnia and Herzegovina) Tomislav Brkić (Italy) Gianluigi Quinzi (Argentina) Andrea Collarini (Czech Republic) Zdeněk Kolář
April 30	Prosperita Open; Ostrava, Czech Republic; Clay – €64,000+H – 32S/32Q/16D; Singles – Doubles	(Hungary) Attila Balázs (Portugal) Gonçalo Oliveira; 6–0, 7–5	(Czech Republic) Lukáš Rosol (Ukraine) Sergiy Stakhovsky	(France) Grégoire Barrère (Italy) Matteo Donati	(Bosnia and Herzegovina) Tomislav Brkić (Italy) Gianluigi Quinzi (Argentina) Andrea Collarini (Czech Republic) Zdeněk Kolář
April 30	Puerto Vallarta Open; Puerto Vallarta, Mexico; Hard – $75,000+H – 32S/32Q/16D; Singles – Doubles	(Spain) Adrián Menéndez Maceiras; 1–6, 7–5, 6–3	(Serbia) Danilo Petrović	(United States) Kevin King (Spain) Carlos Gómez-Herrera	(Dominican Republic) Roberto Cid Subervi (Ecuador) Roberto Quiroz (Croatia) Ante Pavić (Colombia) Santiago Giraldo
April 30	Puerto Vallarta Open; Puerto Vallarta, Mexico; Hard – $75,000+H – 32S/32Q/16D; Singles – Doubles	(Croatia) Ante Pavić (Serbia) Danilo Petrović; 6–7^{(2–7)}, 6–4, [10–5]	(Zimbabwe) Benjamin Lock (Brazil) Fernando Romboli	(United States) Kevin King (Spain) Carlos Gómez-Herrera	(Dominican Republic) Roberto Cid Subervi (Ecuador) Roberto Quiroz (Croatia) Ante Pavić (Colombia) Santiago Giraldo
April 30	Savannah Challenger; Savannah, United States; Clay – $75,000 – 32S/32Q/16D; Singles – Doubles	(Bolivia) Hugo Dellien; 6–1, 1–6, 6–4	(United States) Christian Harrison	(United States) Michael Mmoh (United States) Reilly Opelka	(Australia) Max Purcell (Brazil) Guilherme Clezar (Uruguay) Martín Cuevas (Brazil) Thomaz Bellucci
April 30	Savannah Challenger; Savannah, United States; Clay – $75,000 – 32S/32Q/16D; Singles – Doubles	(United Kingdom) Luke Bambridge (Australia) Akira Santillan; 6–2, 6–2	(Spain) Enrique López Pérez (India) Jeevan Nedunchezhiyan	(United States) Michael Mmoh (United States) Reilly Opelka	(Australia) Max Purcell (Brazil) Guilherme Clezar (Uruguay) Martín Cuevas (Brazil) Thomaz Bellucci

=== May ===
Week of	Tournament	Champions	Runners-up	Semifinalists	Quarterfinalists
May 7	Open du Pays d'Aix; Aix-en-Provence, France; Clay – €127,000+H – 32S/32Q/16D; Singles – Doubles	(Australia) John Millman; 6–1, 6–2	(Australia) Bernard Tomic	(Argentina) Guido Andreozzi (Sweden) Elias Ymer	(Germany) Oscar Otte (Brazil) Thiago Monteiro (Croatia) Nino Serdarušić (Italy) Gianluca Mager
May 7	Open du Pays d'Aix; Aix-en-Provence, France; Clay – €127,000+H – 32S/32Q/16D; Singles – Doubles	(Germany) Philipp Petzschner (Germany) Tim Pütz; 6–7^{(3–7)}, 6–2, [10–8]	(Argentina) Guido Andreozzi (France) Kenny de Schepper	(Argentina) Guido Andreozzi (Sweden) Elias Ymer	(Germany) Oscar Otte (Brazil) Thiago Monteiro (Croatia) Nino Serdarušić (Italy) Gianluca Mager
May 7	Garden Open; Rome, Italy; Clay – €64,000+H – 32S/32Q/16D; Singles – Doubles	(Czech Republic) Adam Pavlásek; 7–6^{(7–1)}, 6–7^{(9–11)}, 6–4	(Serbia) Laslo Đere	(Italy) Gianluigi Quinzi (Germany) Kevin Krawietz	(Brazil) Rogério Dutra Silva (Argentina) Patricio Heras (Czech Republic) Václav Šafránek (Italy) Simone Bolelli
May 7	Garden Open; Rome, Italy; Clay – €64,000+H – 32S/32Q/16D; Singles – Doubles	(Germany) Kevin Krawietz (Germany) Andreas Mies; 6–3, 2–6, [10–4]	(Belgium) Sander Gillé (Belgium) Joran Vliegen	(Italy) Gianluigi Quinzi (Germany) Kevin Krawietz	(Brazil) Rogério Dutra Silva (Argentina) Patricio Heras (Czech Republic) Václav Šafránek (Italy) Simone Bolelli
May 7	Karshi Challenger; Qarshi, Uzbekistan; Hard – $75,000+H – 32S/32Q/16D; Singles – Doubles	(Belarus) Egor Gerasimov; 7–6^{(7–3)}, 2–0 ret.	(Belarus) Sergey Betov	(Spain) Carlos Boluda-Purkiss (Turkey) Cem İlkel	(Uzbekistan) Khumoyun Sultanov (Belarus) Uladzimir Ignatik (South Africa) Lloyd Harris (India) Sasikumar Mukund
May 7	Karshi Challenger; Qarshi, Uzbekistan; Hard – $75,000+H – 32S/32Q/16D; Singles – Doubles	(Kazakhstan) Timur Khabibulin (Ukraine) Vladyslav Manafov; 6–2, 6–1	(Uzbekistan) Sanjar Fayziev (Uzbekistan) Jurabek Karimov	(Spain) Carlos Boluda-Purkiss (Turkey) Cem İlkel	(Uzbekistan) Khumoyun Sultanov (Belarus) Uladzimir Ignatik (South Africa) Lloyd Harris (India) Sasikumar Mukund
May 7	Braga Open; Braga, Portugal; Clay – €43,000+H – 32S/32Q/16D; Singles – Doubles	(Portugal) Pedro Sousa; 6–0, 3–6, 6–3	(Norway) Casper Ruud	(Portugal) Gastão Elias (Australia) Alex de Minaur	(Spain) Sergio Gutiérrez Ferrol (Portugal) João Domingues (Germany) Yannick Hanfmann (Canada) Félix Auger-Aliassime
May 7	Braga Open; Braga, Portugal; Clay – €43,000+H – 32S/32Q/16D; Singles – Doubles	(Netherlands) Sander Arends (Canada) Adil Shamasdin; 6–2, 6–1	(Uruguay) Ariel Behar (Mexico) Miguel Ángel Reyes-Varela	(Portugal) Gastão Elias (Australia) Alex de Minaur	(Spain) Sergio Gutiérrez Ferrol (Portugal) João Domingues (Germany) Yannick Hanfmann (Canada) Félix Auger-Aliassime
May 7	Gimcheon Open ATP Challenger; Gimcheon, South Korea; Hard – $50,000+H – 32S/32Q/16D; Singles – Doubles	(Japan) Yoshihito Nishioka; 6–4, 7–5	(Canada) Vasek Pospisil	(Australia) Max Purcell (South Korea) Kwon Soon-woo	(Japan) Go Soeda (Japan) Makoto Ochi (United States) Mackenzie McDonald (Japan) Renta Tokuda
May 7	Gimcheon Open ATP Challenger; Gimcheon, South Korea; Hard – $50,000+H – 32S/32Q/16D; Singles – Doubles	(South Africa) Ruan Roelofse (Australia) John-Patrick Smith; 6–2, 6–3	(Thailand) Sanchai Ratiwatana (Thailand) Sonchat Ratiwatana	(Australia) Max Purcell (South Korea) Kwon Soon-woo	(Japan) Go Soeda (Japan) Makoto Ochi (United States) Mackenzie McDonald (Japan) Renta Tokuda
May 14	Busan Open; Busan, South Korea; Hard – $150,000+H – 32S/32Q/16D; Singles – Doubles	(Australia) Matthew Ebden; 7–6^{(7–4)}, 6–1	(Canada) Vasek Pospisil	(Canada) Filip Peliwo (Japan) Yosuke Watanuki	(Chinese Taipei) Jason Jung (United States) Mackenzie McDonald (United States) Marcos Giron (China) Zhang Ze
May 14	Busan Open; Busan, South Korea; Hard – $150,000+H – 32S/32Q/16D; Singles – Doubles	(Chinese Taipei) Hsieh Cheng-peng (Indonesia) Christopher Rungkat; 6–4, 6–3	(South Africa) Ruan Roelofse (Australia) John-Patrick Smith	(Canada) Filip Peliwo (Japan) Yosuke Watanuki	(Chinese Taipei) Jason Jung (United States) Mackenzie McDonald (United States) Marcos Giron (China) Zhang Ze
May 14	BNP Paribas Primrose Bordeaux; Bordeaux, France; Clay – €106,000+H – 32S/32Q/16D; Singles – Doubles	(United States) Reilly Opelka; 6–7^{(5–7)}, 6–4, 7–5	(France) Grégoire Barrère	(Argentina) Guido Andreozzi (Latvia) Ernests Gulbis	(United States) Bradley Klahn (France) Elliot Benchetrit (Spain) Daniel Gimeno Traver (United States) Stefan Kozlov
May 14	BNP Paribas Primrose Bordeaux; Bordeaux, France; Clay – €106,000+H – 32S/32Q/16D; Singles – Doubles	(United States) Bradley Klahn (Canada) Peter Polansky; 6–3, 3–6, [10–7]	(Argentina) Guillermo Durán (Argentina) Máximo González	(Argentina) Guido Andreozzi (Latvia) Ernests Gulbis	(United States) Bradley Klahn (France) Elliot Benchetrit (Spain) Daniel Gimeno Traver (United States) Stefan Kozlov
May 14	Heilbronner Neckarcup; Heilbronn, Germany; Clay – €64,000+H – 32S/32Q/16D; Singles – Doubles	(Germany) Rudolf Molleker; 4–6, 6–4, 7–5	(Czech Republic) Jiří Veselý	(Argentina) Juan Ignacio Londero (Poland) Kamil Majchrzak	(Germany) Oscar Otte (Russia) Alexey Vatutin (Germany) Dustin Brown (Switzerland) Henri Laaksonen
May 14	Heilbronner Neckarcup; Heilbronn, Germany; Clay – €64,000+H – 32S/32Q/16D; Singles – Doubles	(Australia) Rameez Junaid (Netherlands) David Pel; 6–2, 2–6, [10–7]	(Germany) Kevin Krawietz (Germany) Andreas Mies	(Argentina) Juan Ignacio Londero (Poland) Kamil Majchrzak	(Germany) Oscar Otte (Russia) Alexey Vatutin (Germany) Dustin Brown (Switzerland) Henri Laaksonen
May 14	Samarkand Challenger; Samarkand, Uzbekistan; Clay – $75,000+H – 32S/32Q/16D; Singles – Doubles	(Italy) Luca Vanni; 6–4, 6–4	(Spain) Mario Vilella Martínez	(Belarus) Uladzimir Ignatik (Serbia) Nikola Milojević	(Chinese Taipei) Yang Tsung-hua (South Africa) Lloyd Harris (Serbia) Miljan Zekić (Hungary) Attila Balázs
May 14	Samarkand Challenger; Samarkand, Uzbekistan; Clay – $75,000+H – 32S/32Q/16D; Singles – Doubles	(India) Sriram Balaji (India) Vishnu Vardhan; Walkover	(Russia) Mikhail Elgin (Uzbekistan) Denis Istomin	(Belarus) Uladzimir Ignatik (Serbia) Nikola Milojević	(Chinese Taipei) Yang Tsung-hua (South Africa) Lloyd Harris (Serbia) Miljan Zekić (Hungary) Attila Balázs
May 14	Lisboa Belém Open; Lisbon, Portugal; Clay – €43,000+H – 32S/32Q/16D; Singles – Doubles	(Spain) Tommy Robredo; 3–6, 6–3, 6–2	(Chile) Cristian Garín	(Portugal) Pedro Sousa (Austria) Sebastian Ofner	(Japan) Taro Daniel (Canada) Félix Auger-Aliassime (Serbia) Miomir Kecmanović (United States) Christian Harrison
May 14	Lisboa Belém Open; Lisbon, Portugal; Clay – €43,000+H – 32S/32Q/16D; Singles – Doubles	(El Salvador) Marcelo Arévalo (Mexico) Miguel Ángel Reyes-Varela; 6–3, 3–6, [10–1]	(Poland) Tomasz Bednarek (United States) Hunter Reese	(Portugal) Pedro Sousa (Austria) Sebastian Ofner	(Japan) Taro Daniel (Canada) Félix Auger-Aliassime (Serbia) Miomir Kecmanović (United States) Christian Harrison
May 21	Loughborough Trophy; Loughborough, United Kingdom; Hard (i) – €85,000 – 32S/32Q/16D; Singles – Doubles	(Japan) Hiroki Moriya; 6–2, 7–5	(United Kingdom) James Ward	(Japan) Yosuke Watanuki (Austria) Maximilian Neuchrist	(Austria) Lucas Miedler (Germany) Daniel Brands (Russia) Teymuraz Gabashvili (Austria) Jurij Rodionov
May 21	Loughborough Trophy; Loughborough, United Kingdom; Hard (i) – €85,000 – 32S/32Q/16D; Singles – Doubles	(Denmark) Frederik Nielsen (United Kingdom) Joe Salisbury; 3–6, 6–3, [10–4]	(United Kingdom) Luke Bambridge (United Kingdom) Jonny O'Mara	(Japan) Yosuke Watanuki (Austria) Maximilian Neuchrist	(Austria) Lucas Miedler (Germany) Daniel Brands (Russia) Teymuraz Gabashvili (Austria) Jurij Rodionov
May 21	Venice Challenge Save Cup; Mestre, Italy; Clay – €43,000+H – 32S/32Q/16D; Singles – Doubles	(Italy) Gianluigi Quinzi; 6–2, 6–2	(Italy) Gian Marco Moroni	(United States) Mitchell Krueger (Serbia) Danilo Petrović	(Italy) Andrea Arnaboldi (Lithuania) Laurynas Grigelis (Italy) Lorenzo Giustino (Spain) Sergio Gutiérrez Ferrol
May 21	Venice Challenge Save Cup; Mestre, Italy; Clay – €43,000+H – 32S/32Q/16D; Singles – Doubles	(Croatia) Marin Draganja (Croatia) Tomislav Draganja; 6–4, 6–7^{(2–7)}, [10–2]	(Monaco) Romain Arneodo (Serbia) Danilo Petrović	(United States) Mitchell Krueger (Serbia) Danilo Petrović	(Italy) Andrea Arnaboldi (Lithuania) Laurynas Grigelis (Italy) Lorenzo Giustino (Spain) Sergio Gutiérrez Ferrol
May 28	Internazionali di Tennis Città di Vicenza; Vicenza, Italy; Clay – €64,000 – 32S/32Q/16D; Singles – Doubles	(Bolivia) Hugo Dellien; 6–4, 5–7, 6–4	(Italy) Matteo Donati	(Italy) Gian Marco Moroni (Italy) Salvatore Caruso	(Brazil) Guilherme Clezar (Ecuador) Roberto Quiroz (Italy) Stefano Travaglia (Serbia) Miomir Kecmanović
May 28	Internazionali di Tennis Città di Vicenza; Vicenza, Italy; Clay – €64,000 – 32S/32Q/16D; Singles – Doubles	(Uruguay) Ariel Behar (Spain) Enrique López Pérez; 6–2, 6–4	(Argentina) Facundo Bagnis (Brazil) Fabrício Neis	(Italy) Gian Marco Moroni (Italy) Salvatore Caruso	(Brazil) Guilherme Clezar (Ecuador) Roberto Quiroz (Italy) Stefano Travaglia (Serbia) Miomir Kecmanović

=== June ===
Week of	Tournament	Champions	Runners-up	Semifinalists	Quarterfinalists
June 4	Moneta Czech Open; Prostějov, Czech Republic; Clay – €127,000+H – 32S/32Q/16D; Singles – Doubles	(Spain) Jaume Munar; 6–1, 6–3	(Serbia) Laslo Đere	(Spain) Guillermo García López (Austria) Gerald Melzer	(Italy) Federico Gaio (Argentina) Guido Pella (Italy) Salvatore Caruso (Sweden) Elias Ymer
June 4	Moneta Czech Open; Prostějov, Czech Republic; Clay – €127,000+H – 32S/32Q/16D; Singles – Doubles	(Ukraine) Denys Molchanov (Slovakia) Igor Zelenay; 4–6, 6–3, [10–7]	(Uruguay) Martín Cuevas (Uruguay) Pablo Cuevas	(Spain) Guillermo García López (Austria) Gerald Melzer	(Italy) Federico Gaio (Argentina) Guido Pella (Italy) Salvatore Caruso (Sweden) Elias Ymer
June 4	Surbiton Trophy; Surbiton, United Kingdom; Grass – €127,000 – 32S/32Q/16D; Singles – Doubles	(France) Jérémy Chardy; 6–4, 4–6, 6–2	(Australia) Alex de Minaur	(United Kingdom) Dan Evans (Australia) Matthew Ebden	(United States) Denis Kudla (Austria) Jürgen Melzer (India) Yuki Bhambri (Ukraine) Sergiy Stakhovsky
June 4	Surbiton Trophy; Surbiton, United Kingdom; Grass – €127,000 – 32S/32Q/16D; Singles – Doubles	(United Kingdom) Luke Bambridge (United Kingdom) Jonny O'Mara; 7–6^{(13–11)}, 4–6, [10–7]	(United Kingdom) Ken Skupski (United Kingdom) Neal Skupski	(United Kingdom) Dan Evans (Australia) Matthew Ebden	(United States) Denis Kudla (Austria) Jürgen Melzer (India) Yuki Bhambri (Ukraine) Sergiy Stakhovsky
June 4	Poznań Open; Poznań, Poland; Clay – €64,000+H – 32S/32Q/16D; Singles – Doubles	(Poland) Hubert Hurkacz; 6–1, 6–1	(Japan) Taro Daniel	(France) Quentin Halys (Italy) Alessandro Giannessi	(Argentina) Facundo Bagnis (Italy) Andrea Arnaboldi (Hungary) Attila Balázs (Russia) Alexey Vatutin
June 4	Poznań Open; Poznań, Poland; Clay – €64,000+H – 32S/32Q/16D; Singles – Doubles	(Poland) Mateusz Kowalczyk (Poland) Szymon Walków; 7–5, 6–7^{(8–10)}, [10–8]	(Hungary) Attila Balázs (Italy) Andrea Vavassori	(France) Quentin Halys (Italy) Alessandro Giannessi	(Argentina) Facundo Bagnis (Italy) Andrea Arnaboldi (Hungary) Attila Balázs (Russia) Alexey Vatutin
June 4	Shymkent Challenger; Shymkent, Kazakhstan; Clay – $50,000+H – 32S/32Q/16D; Singles – Doubles	(Germany) Yannick Hanfmann; 7–6^{(7–3)}, 4–6, 6–2	(Dominican Republic) Roberto Cid Subervi	(Italy) Lorenzo Giustino (Bolivia) Hugo Dellien	(Austria) Jurij Rodionov (Germany) Kevin Krawietz (Austria) Sebastian Ofner (Kazakhstan) Aleksandr Nedovyesov
June 4	Shymkent Challenger; Shymkent, Kazakhstan; Clay – $50,000+H – 32S/32Q/16D; Singles – Doubles	(Italy) Lorenzo Giustino (Portugal) Gonçalo Oliveira; 6–2, 7–6^{(7–4)}	(Austria) Lucas Miedler (Austria) Sebastian Ofner	(Italy) Lorenzo Giustino (Bolivia) Hugo Dellien	(Austria) Jurij Rodionov (Germany) Kevin Krawietz (Austria) Sebastian Ofner (Kazakhstan) Aleksandr Nedovyesov
June 11	Nottingham Open; Nottingham, United Kingdom; Grass – €127,000+H – 32S/32Q/16D; Singles – Doubles	(Australia) Alex de Minaur; 7–6^{(7–4)}, 7–5	(United Kingdom) Dan Evans	(Spain) Marcel Granollers (Belarus) Ilya Ivashka	(Canada) Brayden Schnur (India) Ramkumar Ramanathan (United Kingdom) James Ward (Canada) Peter Polansky
June 11	Nottingham Open; Nottingham, United Kingdom; Grass – €127,000+H – 32S/32Q/16D; Singles – Doubles	(Denmark) Frederik Nielsen (United Kingdom) Joe Salisbury; 7–6^{(7–5)}, 6–1	(United States) Austin Krajicek (India) Jeevan Nedunchezhiyan	(Spain) Marcel Granollers (Belarus) Ilya Ivashka	(Canada) Brayden Schnur (India) Ramkumar Ramanathan (United Kingdom) James Ward (Canada) Peter Polansky
June 11	Città di Caltanissetta; Caltanissetta, Italy; Clay – €127,000+H – 32S/32Q/16D; Singles – Doubles	(Spain) Jaume Munar; 6–2, 7–6^{(7–2)}	(Italy) Matteo Donati	(Austria) Dennis Novak (Hungary) Attila Balázs	(Spain) Alejandro Davidovich Fokina (Czech Republic) Jiří Veselý (Italy) Alessandro Giannessi (Uruguay) Pablo Cuevas
June 11	Città di Caltanissetta; Caltanissetta, Italy; Clay – €127,000+H – 32S/32Q/16D; Singles – Doubles	(Italy) Federico Gaio (Italy) Andrea Pellegrino; 7–6^{(7–4)}, 7–6^{(7–5)}	(Slovenia) Blaž Rola (Czech Republic) Jiří Veselý	(Austria) Dennis Novak (Hungary) Attila Balázs	(Spain) Alejandro Davidovich Fokina (Czech Republic) Jiří Veselý (Italy) Alessandro Giannessi (Uruguay) Pablo Cuevas
June 11	Open Sopra Steria de Lyon; Lyon, France; Clay – €64,000+H – 32S/32Q/16D; Singles – Doubles	(Canada) Félix Auger-Aliassime; 6–7^{(3–7)}, 7–5, 6–2	(France) Johan Tatlot	(Serbia) Miomir Kecmanović (Italy) Roberto Marcora	(Australia) Alexei Popyrin (France) Alexandre Müller (Czech Republic) Adam Pavlásek (Chile) Cristian Garín
June 11	Open Sopra Steria de Lyon; Lyon, France; Clay – €64,000+H – 32S/32Q/16D; Singles – Doubles	(France) Elliot Benchetrit (France) Geoffrey Blancaneaux; 6–3, 4–6, [10–7]	(Chinese Taipei) Hsieh Cheng-peng (Switzerland) Luca Margaroli	(Serbia) Miomir Kecmanović (Italy) Roberto Marcora	(Australia) Alexei Popyrin (France) Alexandre Müller (Czech Republic) Adam Pavlásek (Chile) Cristian Garín
June 11	Almaty Challenger; Almaty, Kazakhstan; Clay – $50,000+H – 32S/32Q/16D; Singles – Doubles	(Austria) Jurij Rodionov; 7–5, 6–2	(Serbia) Peđa Krstin	(Spain) Enrique López Pérez (Germany) Yannick Hanfmann	(Dominican Republic) Roberto Cid Subervi (Chinese Taipei) Yang Tsung-hua (Kazakhstan) Aleksandr Nedovyesov (Brazil) Guilherme Clezar
June 11	Almaty Challenger; Almaty, Kazakhstan; Clay – $50,000+H – 32S/32Q/16D; Singles – Doubles	(Germany) Kevin Krawietz (Germany) Andreas Mies; 6–2, 7–6^{(7–2)}	(Lithuania) Laurynas Grigelis (Ukraine) Vladyslav Manafov	(Spain) Enrique López Pérez (Germany) Yannick Hanfmann	(Dominican Republic) Roberto Cid Subervi (Chinese Taipei) Yang Tsung-hua (Kazakhstan) Aleksandr Nedovyesov (Brazil) Guilherme Clezar
June 18	Ilkley Trophy; Ilkley, United Kingdom; Grass – €127,000 – 32S/32Q/16D; Singles – Doubles	(Ukraine) Sergiy Stakhovsky; 6–4, 6–4	(Germany) Oscar Otte	(United States) Michael Mmoh (Australia) Jason Kubler	(Australia) Jordan Thompson (Italy) Thomas Fabbiano (Canada) Peter Polansky (Barbados) Darian King
June 18	Ilkley Trophy; Ilkley, United Kingdom; Grass – €127,000 – 32S/32Q/16D; Singles – Doubles	(United States) Austin Krajicek (India) Jeevan Nedunchezhiyan; 6–3, 6–3	(Germany) Kevin Krawietz (Germany) Andreas Mies	(United States) Michael Mmoh (Australia) Jason Kubler	(Australia) Jordan Thompson (Italy) Thomas Fabbiano (Canada) Peter Polansky (Barbados) Darian King
June 18	Poprad-Tatry ATP Challenger Tour; Poprad, Slovakia; Clay – €64,000+H – 32S/32Q/16D; Singles – Doubles	(Slovakia) Jozef Kovalík; 6–4, 6–0	(Belgium) Arthur De Greef	(Czech Republic) Zdeněk Kolář (Hungary) Attila Balázs	(Austria) Dennis Novak (Egypt) Mohamed Safwat (Czech Republic) Adam Pavlásek (Spain) Sergio Gutiérrez Ferrol
June 18	Poprad-Tatry ATP Challenger Tour; Poprad, Slovakia; Clay – €64,000+H – 32S/32Q/16D; Singles – Doubles	(Bosnia and Herzegovina) Tomislav Brkić (Croatia) Ante Pavić; 6–3, 4–6, [16–14]	(Serbia) Nikola Ćaćić (Switzerland) Luca Margaroli	(Czech Republic) Zdeněk Kolář (Hungary) Attila Balázs	(Austria) Dennis Novak (Egypt) Mohamed Safwat (Czech Republic) Adam Pavlásek (Spain) Sergio Gutiérrez Ferrol
June 18	Fergana Challenger; Fergana, Uzbekistan; Hard – $75,000+H – 32S/32Q/16D; Singles – Doubles	(Serbia) Nikola Milojević; 6–3, 6–4	(Spain) Enrique López Pérez	(India) Saketh Myneni (Belarus) Egor Gerasimov	(Japan) Yosuke Watanuki (Turkey) Cem İlkel (Bosnia and Herzegovina) Aldin Šetkić (Japan) Shuichi Sekiguchi
June 18	Fergana Challenger; Fergana, Uzbekistan; Hard – $75,000+H – 32S/32Q/16D; Singles – Doubles	(Russia) Ivan Gakhov (Russia) Alexander Pavlioutchenkov; 6–4, 6–4	(India) Saketh Myneni (India) Vijay Sundar Prashanth	(India) Saketh Myneni (Belarus) Egor Gerasimov	(Japan) Yosuke Watanuki (Turkey) Cem İlkel (Bosnia and Herzegovina) Aldin Šetkić (Japan) Shuichi Sekiguchi
June 18	Internationaux de Tennis de Blois; Blois, France; Clay – €43,000+H – 32S/32Q/16D; Singles – Doubles	(Netherlands) Scott Griekspoor; 6–4, 6–4	(Canada) Félix Auger-Aliassime	(Netherlands) Thiemo de Bakker (France) Stéphane Robert	(France) Tristan Lamasine (Chile) Cristian Garín (Argentina) Juan Ignacio Londero (Argentina) Pedro Cachin
June 18	Internationaux de Tennis de Blois; Blois, France; Clay – €43,000+H – 32S/32Q/16D; Singles – Doubles	(Brazil) Fabrício Neis (Spain) David Vega Hernández; 7–6^{(7–4)}, 6–1	(Chinese Taipei) Hsieh Cheng-peng (Australia) Rameez Junaid	(Netherlands) Thiemo de Bakker (France) Stéphane Robert	(France) Tristan Lamasine (Chile) Cristian Garín (Argentina) Juan Ignacio Londero (Argentina) Pedro Cachin
June 18	Internazionali di Tennis Città dell'Aquila; L'Aquila, Italy; Clay – €43,000+H – 32S/32Q/16D; Singles – Doubles	(Argentina) Facundo Bagnis; 2–6, 6–3, 6–4	(Italy) Paolo Lorenzi	(Brazil) Guilherme Clezar (Brazil) Thiago Monteiro	(Colombia) Daniel Elahi Galán (Italy) Gianluigi Quinzi (Italy) Gian Marco Moroni (Italy) Filippo Baldi
June 18	Internazionali di Tennis Città dell'Aquila; L'Aquila, Italy; Clay – €43,000+H – 32S/32Q/16D; Singles – Doubles	(Italy) Filippo Baldi (Italy) Andrea Pellegrino; 4–6, 6–3, [10–5]	(Spain) Pedro Martínez (Netherlands) Mark Vervoort	(Brazil) Guilherme Clezar (Brazil) Thiago Monteiro	(Colombia) Daniel Elahi Galán (Italy) Gianluigi Quinzi (Italy) Gian Marco Moroni (Italy) Filippo Baldi
June 25	Aspria Tennis Cup; Milan, Italy; Clay – €43,000+H – 32S/32Q/16D; Singles – Doubles	(Serbia) Laslo Đere; 6–2, 6–1	(Italy) Gianluca Mager	(Netherlands) Thiemo de Bakker (Serbia) Peđa Krstin	(Portugal) João Domingues (Italy) Andrea Arnaboldi (Brazil) Rogério Dutra Silva (Portugal) Pedro Sousa
June 25	Aspria Tennis Cup; Milan, Italy; Clay – €43,000+H – 32S/32Q/16D; Singles – Doubles	(Italy) Julian Ocleppo (Italy) Andrea Vavassori; 4–6, 6–1, [11–9]	(Ecuador) Gonzalo Escobar (Brazil) Fernando Romboli	(Netherlands) Thiemo de Bakker (Serbia) Peđa Krstin	(Portugal) João Domingues (Italy) Andrea Arnaboldi (Brazil) Rogério Dutra Silva (Portugal) Pedro Sousa

=== July ===
Week of	Tournament	Champions	Runners-up	Semifinalists	Quarterfinalists
July 2	Marburg Open; Marburg, Germany; Clay – €43,000+H – 32S/32Q/16D; Singles – Doubles	(Argentina) Juan Ignacio Londero; 3–6, 7–5, 6–4	(Bolivia) Hugo Dellien	(Canada) Félix Auger-Aliassime (Germany) Julian Lenz	(Argentina) Carlos Berlocq (Germany) Oscar Otte (Slovakia) Andrej Martin (France) Elliot Benchetrit
July 2	Marburg Open; Marburg, Germany; Clay – €43,000+H – 32S/32Q/16D; Singles – Doubles	(Brazil) Fabrício Neis (Spain) David Vega Hernández; 4–6, 6–4, [10–8]	(Switzerland) Henri Laaksonen (Switzerland) Luca Margaroli	(Canada) Félix Auger-Aliassime (Germany) Julian Lenz	(Argentina) Carlos Berlocq (Germany) Oscar Otte (Slovakia) Andrej Martin (France) Elliot Benchetrit
July 2	Guzzini Challenger; Recanati, Italy; Hard – €43,000+H – 32S/32Q/16D; Singles – Doubles	(Germany) Daniel Brands; 7–5, 6–3	(Spain) Adrián Menéndez Maceiras	(Ecuador) Roberto Quiroz (Croatia) Viktor Galović	(Italy) Salvatore Caruso (Japan) Hiroki Moriya (Italy) Lorenzo Giustino (Belarus) Ilya Ivashka
July 2	Guzzini Challenger; Recanati, Italy; Hard – €43,000+H – 32S/32Q/16D; Singles – Doubles	(China) Gong Maoxin (China) Zhang Ze; 2–6, 7–6^{(7–5)}, [10–8]	(Ecuador) Gonzalo Escobar (Brazil) Fernando Romboli	(Ecuador) Roberto Quiroz (Croatia) Viktor Galović	(Italy) Salvatore Caruso (Japan) Hiroki Moriya (Italy) Lorenzo Giustino (Belarus) Ilya Ivashka
July 9	Sparkassen Open; Braunschweig, Germany; Clay – €127,000+H – 32S/32Q/16D; Singles – Doubles	(Germany) Yannick Hanfmann; 6–2, 3–6, 6–3	(Slovakia) Jozef Kovalík	(Belgium) Arthur De Greef (Italy) Andrea Arnaboldi	(Uruguay) Pablo Cuevas (Bolivia) Hugo Dellien (Germany) Mats Moraing (Spain) Roberto Carballés Baena
July 9	Sparkassen Open; Braunschweig, Germany; Clay – €127,000+H – 32S/32Q/16D; Singles – Doubles	(Mexico) Santiago González (Netherlands) Wesley Koolhof; 6–3, 6–3	(India) Sriram Balaji (India) Vishnu Vardhan	(Belgium) Arthur De Greef (Italy) Andrea Arnaboldi	(Uruguay) Pablo Cuevas (Bolivia) Hugo Dellien (Germany) Mats Moraing (Spain) Roberto Carballés Baena
July 9	Nielsen Pro Tennis Championship; Winnetka, United States; Hard – $75,000 – 32S/32Q/16D; Singles – Doubles	(Russia) Evgeny Karlovskiy; 6–3, 6–2	(Chinese Taipei) Jason Jung	(Australia) Dayne Kelly (United States) Collin Altamirano	(United States) Tommy Paul (France) Tom Jomby (Egypt) Mohamed Safwat (United States) Mitchell Krueger
July 9	Nielsen Pro Tennis Championship; Winnetka, United States; Hard – $75,000 – 32S/32Q/16D; Singles – Doubles	(United States) Austin Krajicek (India) Jeevan Nedunchezhiyan; 6–7^{(4–7)}, 6–4, [10–5]	(Venezuela) Roberto Maytín (Indonesia) Christopher Rungkat	(Australia) Dayne Kelly (United States) Collin Altamirano	(United States) Tommy Paul (France) Tom Jomby (Egypt) Mohamed Safwat (United States) Mitchell Krueger
July 9	Winnipeg National Bank Challenger; Winnipeg, Canada; Hard – $75,000 – 32S/32Q/16D; Singles – Doubles	(Australia) Jason Kubler; 6–1, 6–1	(Austria) Lucas Miedler	(Japan) Go Soeda (Spain) Marcel Granollers	(Japan) Kaichi Uchida (Canada) Alexis Galarneau (Switzerland) Marc-Andrea Hüsler (Denmark) Mikael Torpegaard
July 9	Winnipeg National Bank Challenger; Winnipeg, Canada; Hard – $75,000 – 32S/32Q/16D; Singles – Doubles	(Switzerland) Marc-Andrea Hüsler (Netherlands) Sem Verbeek; 6–7^{(5–7)}, 6–3, [14–12]	(Spain) Gerard Granollers (Spain) Marcel Granollers	(Japan) Go Soeda (Spain) Marcel Granollers	(Japan) Kaichi Uchida (Canada) Alexis Galarneau (Switzerland) Marc-Andrea Hüsler (Denmark) Mikael Torpegaard
July 9	Båstad Challenger; Båstad, Sweden; Clay – €43,000+H – 32S/32Q/16D; Singles – Doubles	(Spain) Pedro Martínez; 7–6^{(7–5)}, 6–4	(France) Corentin Moutet	(Slovakia) Filip Horanský (Sweden) Mikael Ymer	(Czech Republic) Lukáš Rosol (France) Constant Lestienne (Czech Republic) Václav Šafránek (Argentina) Carlos Berlocq
July 9	Båstad Challenger; Båstad, Sweden; Clay – €43,000+H – 32S/32Q/16D; Singles – Doubles	(Finland) Harri Heliövaara (Switzerland) Henri Laaksonen; 6–4, 6–3	(Czech Republic) Zdeněk Kolář (Portugal) Gonçalo Oliveira	(Slovakia) Filip Horanský (Sweden) Mikael Ymer	(Czech Republic) Lukáš Rosol (France) Constant Lestienne (Czech Republic) Václav Šafránek (Argentina) Carlos Berlocq
July 9	Internazionali di Tennis Città di Perugia; Perugia, Italy; Clay – €43,000+H – 32S/32Q/16D; Singles – Doubles	(United States) Ulises Blanch; 7–5, 6–2	(Italy) Gianluigi Quinzi	(Italy) Salvatore Caruso (Hungary) Attila Balázs	(Italy) Alessandro Giannessi (Spain) Daniel Gimeno Traver (Spain) Bernabé Zapata Miralles (Argentina) Marco Trungelliti
July 9	Internazionali di Tennis Città di Perugia; Perugia, Italy; Clay – €43,000+H – 32S/32Q/16D; Singles – Doubles	(Italy) Daniele Bracciali (Italy) Matteo Donati; 6–3, 3–6, [10–7]	(Bosnia and Herzegovina) Tomislav Brkić (Croatia) Ante Pavić	(Italy) Salvatore Caruso (Hungary) Attila Balázs	(Italy) Alessandro Giannessi (Spain) Daniel Gimeno Traver (Spain) Bernabé Zapata Miralles (Argentina) Marco Trungelliti
July 16	President's Cup; Astana, Kazakhstan; Hard – $125,000 – 32S/32Q/16D; Singles – Doubles	(Austria) Sebastian Ofner; 7–6^{(7–5)}, 6–3	(Germany) Daniel Brands	(Austria) Jurij Rodionov (Australia) Alexei Popyrin	(India) Saketh Myneni (France) Maxime Janvier (Kazakhstan) Aleksandr Nedovyesov (Russia) Pavel Kotov
July 16	President's Cup; Astana, Kazakhstan; Hard – $125,000 – 32S/32Q/16D; Singles – Doubles	(Russia) Mikhail Elgin (Belarus) Yaraslav Shyla; 7–5, 7–6^{(8–6)}	(India) Arjun Kadhe (Kazakhstan) Denis Yevseyev	(Austria) Jurij Rodionov (Australia) Alexei Popyrin	(India) Saketh Myneni (France) Maxime Janvier (Kazakhstan) Aleksandr Nedovyesov (Russia) Pavel Kotov
July 16	San Benedetto Tennis Cup; San Benedetto del Tronto, Italy; Clay – €64,000+H – 32S/32Q/16D; Singles – Doubles	(Colombia) Daniel Elahi Galán; 6–2, 3–6, 6–2	(Spain) Sergio Gutiérrez Ferrol	(Italy) Lorenzo Giustino (Spain) Carlos Taberner	(Italy) Andrea Arnaboldi (Italy) Luca Vanni (Italy) Matteo Viola (Croatia) Ante Pavić
July 16	San Benedetto Tennis Cup; San Benedetto del Tronto, Italy; Clay – €64,000+H – 32S/32Q/16D; Singles – Doubles	(Italy) Julian Ocleppo (Italy) Andrea Vavassori; 6–3, 6–2	(Peru) Sergio Galdós (Bolivia) Federico Zeballos	(Italy) Lorenzo Giustino (Spain) Carlos Taberner	(Italy) Andrea Arnaboldi (Italy) Luca Vanni (Italy) Matteo Viola (Croatia) Ante Pavić
July 16	The Hague Open; Scheveningen, Netherlands; Clay – €64,000+H – 32S/32Q/16D; Singles – Doubles	(Netherlands) Thiemo de Bakker; 6–2, 6–1	(Germany) Yannick Maden	(Czech Republic) Lukáš Rosol (Belgium) Kimmer Coppejans	(Hungary) Attila Balázs (Slovenia) Blaž Rola (Germany) Oscar Otte (Italy) Alessandro Giannessi
July 16	The Hague Open; Scheveningen, Netherlands; Clay – €64,000+H – 32S/32Q/16D; Singles – Doubles	(Philippines) Ruben Gonzales (United States) Nathaniel Lammons; 6–3, 6–7^{(8–10)}, [10–5]	(Venezuela) Luis David Martínez (Portugal) Gonçalo Oliveira	(Czech Republic) Lukáš Rosol (Belgium) Kimmer Coppejans	(Hungary) Attila Balázs (Slovenia) Blaž Rola (Germany) Oscar Otte (Italy) Alessandro Giannessi
July 16	Challenger Banque Nationale de Gatineau; Gatineau, Canada; Hard – $75,000 – 32S/32Q/16D; Singles – Doubles	(United States) Bradley Klahn; 6–3, 7–6^{(7–5)}	(France) Ugo Humbert	(Japan) Go Soeda (Australia) Jason Kubler	(Canada) Peter Polansky (Austria) Maximilian Neuchrist (China) Li Zhe (United States) Ernesto Escobedo
July 16	Challenger Banque Nationale de Gatineau; Gatineau, Canada; Hard – $75,000 – 32S/32Q/16D; Singles – Doubles	(United States) Robert Galloway (United States) Bradley Klahn; 7–6^{(7–4)}, 4–6, [10–8]	(Barbados) Darian King (Canada) Peter Polansky	(Japan) Go Soeda (Australia) Jason Kubler	(Canada) Peter Polansky (Austria) Maximilian Neuchrist (China) Li Zhe (United States) Ernesto Escobedo
July 23	Challenger Banque Nationale de Granby; Granby, Canada; Hard – $100,000 – 32S/32Q/16D; Singles – Doubles	(Canada) Peter Polansky; 6–4, 1–6, 6–2	(France) Ugo Humbert	(Slovakia) Norbert Gombos (Canada) Frank Dancevic	(Canada) Brayden Schnur (Belgium) Joris De Loore (Italy) Stefano Napolitano (United States) Alexander Sarkissian
July 23	Challenger Banque Nationale de Granby; Granby, Canada; Hard – $100,000 – 32S/32Q/16D; Singles – Doubles	(United States) Alex Lawson (China) Li Zhe; 7–6^{(7–2)}, 6–3	(United States) JC Aragone (United Kingdom) Liam Broady	(Slovakia) Norbert Gombos (Canada) Frank Dancevic	(Canada) Brayden Schnur (Belgium) Joris De Loore (Italy) Stefano Napolitano (United States) Alexander Sarkissian
July 23	Levene Gouldin & Thompson Tennis Challenger; Binghamton, United States; Hard – $75,000 – 32S/32Q/16D; Singles – Doubles	(United Kingdom) Jay Clarke; 6–7^{(6–8)}, 7–6^{(7–5)}, 6–4	(Australia) Jordan Thompson	(Lithuania) Laurynas Grigelis (Spain) Marcel Granollers	(Germany) Dominik Köpfer (Barbados) Darian King (Russia) Evgeny Karlovskiy (South Africa) Lloyd Harris
July 23	Levene Gouldin & Thompson Tennis Challenger; Binghamton, United States; Hard – $75,000 – 32S/32Q/16D; Singles – Doubles	(Spain) Gerard Granollers (Spain) Marcel Granollers; 7–6^{(7–2)}, 6–4	(Colombia) Alejandro Gómez (Brazil) Caio Silva	(Lithuania) Laurynas Grigelis (Spain) Marcel Granollers	(Germany) Dominik Köpfer (Barbados) Darian King (Russia) Evgeny Karlovskiy (South Africa) Lloyd Harris
July 23	Advantage Cars Prague Open; Prague, Czech Republic; Clay – €43,000+H – 32S/32Q/16D; Singles – Doubles	(Czech Republic) Lukáš Rosol; 4–6, 6–3, 6–4	(Kazakhstan) Aleksandr Nedovyesov	(Spain) Pedro Martínez (Slovakia) Filip Horanský	(Brazil) Guilherme Clezar (Germany) Mats Moraing (Spain) Enrique López Pérez (Czech Republic) Václav Šafránek
July 23	Advantage Cars Prague Open; Prague, Czech Republic; Clay – €43,000+H – 32S/32Q/16D; Singles – Doubles	(Belgium) Sander Gillé (Belgium) Joran Vliegen; 6–4, 6–2	(Brazil) Fernando Romboli (Spain) David Vega Hernández	(Spain) Pedro Martínez (Slovakia) Filip Horanský	(Brazil) Guilherme Clezar (Germany) Mats Moraing (Spain) Enrique López Pérez (Czech Republic) Václav Šafránek
July 23	Tampere Open; Tampere, Finland; Clay – €43,000+H – 32S/32Q/16D; Singles – Doubles	(Netherlands) Tallon Griekspoor; 6–3, 2–6, 6–3	(Argentina) Juan Ignacio Londero	(Bolivia) Hugo Dellien (France) Tristan Lamasine	(Poland) Kamil Majchrzak (France) Antoine Hoang (Argentina) Marco Trungelliti (Netherlands) Thiemo de Bakker
July 23	Tampere Open; Tampere, Finland; Clay – €43,000+H – 32S/32Q/16D; Singles – Doubles	(Sweden) Markus Eriksson (Sweden) André Göransson; 6–3, 3–6, [10–7]	(Russia) Ivan Gakhov (Russia) Alexander Pavlioutchenkov	(Bolivia) Hugo Dellien (France) Tristan Lamasine	(Poland) Kamil Majchrzak (France) Antoine Hoang (Argentina) Marco Trungelliti (Netherlands) Thiemo de Bakker
July 23	Internazionali di Tennis Country 2001 Team; Padua, Italy; Clay – €43,000+H – 32S/32Q/16D; Singles – Doubles	(Spain) Sergio Gutiérrez Ferrol; 6–2, 3–6, 6–1	(Italy) Federico Gaio	(Peru) Juan Pablo Varillas (Spain) Tommy Robredo	(Croatia) Ante Pavić (Bosnia and Herzegovina) Tomislav Brkić (Spain) Carlos Boluda-Purkiss (Italy) Gian Marco Moroni
July 23	Internazionali di Tennis Country 2001 Team; Padua, Italy; Clay – €43,000+H – 32S/32Q/16D; Singles – Doubles	(Bosnia and Herzegovina) Tomislav Brkić (Croatia) Ante Pavić; 6–2, 7–6^{(7–4)}	(Italy) Walter Trusendi (Italy) Andrea Vavassori	(Peru) Juan Pablo Varillas (Spain) Tommy Robredo	(Croatia) Ante Pavić (Bosnia and Herzegovina) Tomislav Brkić (Spain) Carlos Boluda-Purkiss (Italy) Gian Marco Moroni
July 30	Chengdu Challenger; Chengdu, China; Hard – $125,000 – 32S/32Q/16D; Singles – Doubles	(China) Zhang Ze; 2–6, 5–2 ret.	(Switzerland) Henri Laaksonen	(United Kingdom) James Ward (Australia) Akira Santillan	(China) Wu Yibing (Russia) Roman Safiullin (Japan) Tatsuma Ito (Kazakhstan) Denis Yevseyev
July 30	Chengdu Challenger; Chengdu, China; Hard – $125,000 – 32S/32Q/16D; Singles – Doubles	(China) Gong Maoxin (China) Zhang Ze; 6–4, 6–4	(Russia) Mikhail Elgin (Belarus) Yaraslav Shyla	(United Kingdom) James Ward (Australia) Akira Santillan	(China) Wu Yibing (Russia) Roman Safiullin (Japan) Tatsuma Ito (Kazakhstan) Denis Yevseyev
July 30	Open Castilla y León; Segovia, Spain; Hard – €85,000+H – 32S/32Q/16D; Singles – Doubles	(France) Ugo Humbert; 6–3, 6–4	(Spain) Adrián Menéndez Maceiras	(Italy) Luca Vanni (Italy) Andrea Arnaboldi	(Ecuador) Roberto Quiroz (Italy) Gian Marco Moroni (Germany) Daniel Brands (Spain) Andrés Artuñedo
July 30	Open Castilla y León; Segovia, Spain; Hard – €85,000+H – 32S/32Q/16D; Singles – Doubles	(Spain) Andrés Artuñedo (Spain) David Pérez Sanz; 6–7^{(3–7)}, 6–3, [10–6]	(Argentina) Matías Franco Descotte (Portugal) João Monteiro	(Italy) Luca Vanni (Italy) Andrea Arnaboldi	(Ecuador) Roberto Quiroz (Italy) Gian Marco Moroni (Germany) Daniel Brands (Spain) Andrés Artuñedo
July 30	Sopot Open; Sopot, Poland; Clay – €64,000+H – 32S/32Q/16D; Singles – Doubles	(Italy) Paolo Lorenzi; 7–6^{(7–2)}, 6–7^{(5–7)}, 6–3	(Spain) Daniel Gimeno Traver	(Argentina) Pedro Cachin (Czech Republic) Zdeněk Kolář	(Spain) Tommy Robredo (Netherlands) Thiemo de Bakker (France) Maxime Janvier (Germany) Oscar Otte
July 30	Sopot Open; Sopot, Poland; Clay – €64,000+H – 32S/32Q/16D; Singles – Doubles	(Poland) Mateusz Kowalczyk (Poland) Szymon Walków; 7–6^{(8–6)}, 6–3	(Philippines) Ruben Gonzales (United States) Nathaniel Lammons	(Argentina) Pedro Cachin (Czech Republic) Zdeněk Kolář	(Spain) Tommy Robredo (Netherlands) Thiemo de Bakker (France) Maxime Janvier (Germany) Oscar Otte
July 30	Kentucky Bank Tennis Championships; Lexington, United States; Hard – $75,000 – 32S/32Q/16D; Singles – Doubles	(South Africa) Lloyd Harris; 6–4, 6–3	(Italy) Stefano Napolitano	(South Korea) Chung Yun-seong (Belgium) Joris De Loore	(United Kingdom) Jay Clarke (Croatia) Borna Gojo (United States) Ronnie Schneider (United States) Collin Altamirano
July 30	Kentucky Bank Tennis Championships; Lexington, United States; Hard – $75,000 – 32S/32Q/16D; Singles – Doubles	(United States) Robert Galloway (Venezuela) Roberto Maytín; 6–3, 6–1	(Belgium) Joris De Loore (Australia) Marc Polmans	(South Korea) Chung Yun-seong (Belgium) Joris De Loore	(United Kingdom) Jay Clarke (Croatia) Borna Gojo (United States) Ronnie Schneider (United States) Collin Altamirano
July 30	Svijany Open; Liberec, Czech Republic; Clay – €43,000+H – 32S/32Q/16D; Singles – Doubles	(Slovakia) Andrej Martin; 6–1, 6–2	(Portugal) Pedro Sousa	(Portugal) Gonçalo Oliveira (Russia) Pavel Kotov	(France) Johan Tatlot (Portugal) João Domingues (Spain) Pedro Martínez (Czech Republic) Michael Vrbenský
July 30	Svijany Open; Liberec, Czech Republic; Clay – €43,000+H – 32S/32Q/16D; Singles – Doubles	(Belgium) Sander Gillé (Belgium) Joran Vliegen; 6–3, 6–4	(Slovakia) Filip Polášek (Czech Republic) Patrik Rikl	(Portugal) Gonçalo Oliveira (Russia) Pavel Kotov	(France) Johan Tatlot (Portugal) João Domingues (Spain) Pedro Martínez (Czech Republic) Michael Vrbenský

=== August ===
Week of	Tournament	Champions	Runners-up	Semifinalists	Quarterfinalists
August 6	IsarOpen; Pullach, Germany; Clay – €127,000+H – 32S/32Q/16D; Singles – Doubles	(Portugal) Pedro Sousa; 6–1, 6–3	(Germany) Jan-Lennard Struff	(Slovakia) Martin Kližan (Germany) Kevin Krawietz	(Argentina) Carlos Berlocq (Sweden) Mikael Ymer (Italy) Gianluca Mager (Czech Republic) Jiří Veselý
August 6	IsarOpen; Pullach, Germany; Clay – €127,000+H – 32S/32Q/16D; Singles – Doubles	(Belgium) Sander Gillé (Belgium) Joran Vliegen; 6–2, 6–2	(Italy) Simone Bolelli (Italy) Daniele Bracciali	(Slovakia) Martin Kližan (Germany) Kevin Krawietz	(Argentina) Carlos Berlocq (Sweden) Mikael Ymer (Italy) Gianluca Mager (Czech Republic) Jiří Veselý
August 6	Jinan International Open; Jinan, China; Hard – $150,000 – 32S/32Q/16D; Singles – Doubles	(Australia) Alexei Popyrin; 3–6, 6–1, 7–5	(United Kingdom) James Ward	(China) Zhang Zhizhen (China) Xia Zihao	(Kazakhstan) Denis Yevseyev (Russia) Roman Safiullin (South Korea) Lee Duck-hee (China) Zhang Ze
August 6	Jinan International Open; Jinan, China; Hard – $150,000 – 32S/32Q/16D; Singles – Doubles	(Chinese Taipei) Hsieh Cheng-peng (Chinese Taipei) Yang Tsung-hua; 7–6^{(7–5)}, 4–6, [10–5]	(Kazakhstan) Alexander Bublik (Russia) Alexander Pavlioutchenkov	(China) Zhang Zhizhen (China) Xia Zihao	(Kazakhstan) Denis Yevseyev (Russia) Roman Safiullin (South Korea) Lee Duck-hee (China) Zhang Ze
August 6	Nordic Naturals Challenger; Aptos, United States; Hard – $100,000 – 32S/32Q/16D; Singles – Doubles	(Australia) Thanasi Kokkinakis; 6–2, 6–3	(South Africa) Lloyd Harris	(Italy) Thomas Fabbiano (United States) Christopher Eubanks	(United States) Martin Redlicki (India) Prajnesh Gunneswaran (United Kingdom) Liam Broady (United States) Ernesto Escobedo
August 6	Nordic Naturals Challenger; Aptos, United States; Hard – $100,000 – 32S/32Q/16D; Singles – Doubles	(Australia) Thanasi Kokkinakis (Australia) Matt Reid; 6–2, 4–6, [10–8]	(United Kingdom) Jonny O'Mara (United Kingdom) Joe Salisbury	(Italy) Thomas Fabbiano (United States) Christopher Eubanks	(United States) Martin Redlicki (India) Prajnesh Gunneswaran (United Kingdom) Liam Broady (United States) Ernesto Escobedo
August 6	Tilia Slovenia Open; Portorož, Slovenia; Hard – €64,000 – 32S/32Q/16D; Singles – Doubles	(France) Constant Lestienne; 6–2, 6–1	(Italy) Andrea Arnaboldi	(Germany) Dominik Köpfer (Spain) Adrián Menéndez Maceiras	(Ukraine) Sergiy Stakhovsky (Italy) Gian Marco Moroni (Italy) Salvatore Caruso (Bosnia and Herzegovina) Aldin Šetkić
August 6	Tilia Slovenia Open; Portorož, Slovenia; Hard – €64,000 – 32S/32Q/16D; Singles – Doubles	(Spain) Gerard Granollers (Czech Republic) Lukáš Rosol; 7–5, 6–3	(Serbia) Nikola Ćaćić (Austria) Lucas Miedler	(Germany) Dominik Köpfer (Spain) Adrián Menéndez Maceiras	(Ukraine) Sergiy Stakhovsky (Italy) Gian Marco Moroni (Italy) Salvatore Caruso (Bosnia and Herzegovina) Aldin Šetkić
August 13	Vancouver Open; Vancouver, Canada; Hard – $100,000 – 32S/32Q/16D; Singles – Doubles	(United Kingdom) Dan Evans; 4–6, 7–5, 7–6^{(7–3)}	(Australia) Jason Kubler	(Canada) Vasek Pospisil (France) Grégoire Barrère	(South Africa) Lloyd Harris (Belarus) Ilya Ivashka (United States) JC Aragone (Germany) Yannick Maden
August 13	Vancouver Open; Vancouver, Canada; Hard – $100,000 – 32S/32Q/16D; Singles – Doubles	(United Kingdom) Luke Bambridge (United Kingdom) Neal Skupski; 4–6, 6–3, [10–6]	(Australia) Marc Polmans (Australia) Max Purcell	(Canada) Vasek Pospisil (France) Grégoire Barrère	(South Africa) Lloyd Harris (Belarus) Ilya Ivashka (United States) JC Aragone (Germany) Yannick Maden
August 13	Internazionali di Tennis del Friuli Venezia Giulia; Cordenons, Italy; Clay – €64,000+H – 32S/32Q/16D; Singles – Doubles	(Italy) Paolo Lorenzi; 6–3, 3–6, 6–4	(Hungary) Máté Valkusz	(Portugal) João Domingues (Brazil) Guilherme Clezar	(Spain) Tommy Robredo (France) Enzo Couacaud (Czech Republic) Zdeněk Kolář (Argentina) Facundo Bagnis
August 13	Internazionali di Tennis del Friuli Venezia Giulia; Cordenons, Italy; Clay – €64,000+H – 32S/32Q/16D; Singles – Doubles	(Ukraine) Denys Molchanov (Slovakia) Igor Zelenay; 3–6, 6–3, [11–9]	(Slovakia) Andrej Martin (Spain) Daniel Muñoz de la Nava	(Portugal) João Domingues (Brazil) Guilherme Clezar	(Spain) Tommy Robredo (France) Enzo Couacaud (Czech Republic) Zdeněk Kolář (Argentina) Facundo Bagnis
August 13	Gwangju Open; Gwangju, South Korea; Hard – $50,000+H – 32S/32Q/16D; Singles – Doubles	(Australia) Maverick Banes; 6–3, 4–6, 6–4	(South Korea) Nam Ji-sung	(Japan) Makoto Ochi (Kazakhstan) Alexander Bublik	(Australia) Alexei Popyrin (South Korea) Lee Duck-hee (Japan) Renta Tokuda (Australia) Akira Santillan
August 13	Gwangju Open; Gwangju, South Korea; Hard – $50,000+H – 32S/32Q/16D; Singles – Doubles	(South Korea) Nam Ji-sung (South Korea) Song Min-kyu; 5–7, 6–3, [10–5]	(Zimbabwe) Benjamin Lock (New Zealand) Rubin Statham	(Japan) Makoto Ochi (Kazakhstan) Alexander Bublik	(Australia) Alexei Popyrin (South Korea) Lee Duck-hee (Japan) Renta Tokuda (Australia) Akira Santillan
August 13	Meerbusch Challenger; Meerbusch, Germany; Clay – €43,000+H – 32S/32Q/16D; Singles – Doubles	(Slovakia) Filip Horanský; 6–7^{(7–9)}, 6–3, 6–3	(Germany) Jan Choinski	(Germany) Dustin Brown (Germany) Rudolf Molleker	(Spain) Bernabé Zapata Miralles (Germany) Kevin Krawietz (Spain) Nicola Kuhn (Portugal) Pedro Sousa
August 13	Meerbusch Challenger; Meerbusch, Germany; Clay – €43,000+H – 32S/32Q/16D; Singles – Doubles	(Spain) David Pérez Sanz (Netherlands) Mark Vervoort; 3–6, 6–4, [10–7]	(Poland) Grzegorz Panfil (Ukraine) Volodymyr Uzhylovskyi	(Germany) Dustin Brown (Germany) Rudolf Molleker	(Spain) Bernabé Zapata Miralles (Germany) Kevin Krawietz (Spain) Nicola Kuhn (Portugal) Pedro Sousa
August 20	No tournaments scheduled.				
August 27	Città di Como Challenger; Como, Italy; Clay – €64,000 – 32S/32Q/16D; Singles – Doubles	(Italy) Salvatore Caruso; 7–5, 6–4	(Chile) Cristian Garín	(Croatia) Viktor Galović (Italy) Matteo Donati	(Slovakia) Martin Kližan (Argentina) Juan Ignacio Londero (Italy) Filippo Baldi (Argentina) Facundo Argüello
August 27	Città di Como Challenger; Como, Italy; Clay – €64,000 – 32S/32Q/16D; Singles – Doubles	(Germany) Andre Begemann (Germany) Dustin Brown; 3–6, 6–4, [10–5]	(Slovakia) Martin Kližan (Slovakia) Filip Polášek	(Croatia) Viktor Galović (Italy) Matteo Donati	(Slovakia) Martin Kližan (Argentina) Juan Ignacio Londero (Italy) Filippo Baldi (Argentina) Facundo Argüello
August 27	Rafa Nadal Open Banc Sabadell; Manacor, Spain; Hard – €43,000+H – 32S/32Q/16D; Singles – Doubles	(Australia) Bernard Tomic; 4–6, 6–3, 7–6^{(7–3)}	(Germany) Matthias Bachinger	(Spain) Enrique López Pérez (France) Kenny de Schepper	(Italy) Thomas Fabbiano (Spain) Nicola Kuhn (Germany) Daniel Brands (Slovakia) Norbert Gombos
August 27	Rafa Nadal Open Banc Sabadell; Manacor, Spain; Hard – €43,000+H – 32S/32Q/16D; Singles – Doubles	(Uruguay) Ariel Behar (Spain) Enrique López Pérez; Walkover	(United Kingdom) Dan Evans (Spain) Gerard Granollers	(Spain) Enrique López Pérez (France) Kenny de Schepper	(Italy) Thomas Fabbiano (Spain) Nicola Kuhn (Germany) Daniel Brands (Slovakia) Norbert Gombos

=== September ===
Week of	Tournament	Champions	Runners-up	Semifinalists	Quarterfinalists
September 3	Oracle Challenger Series – Chicago; Chicago, United States; Hard – $150,000+H – 32S/32Q/16D; Singles – Doubles	(Uzbekistan) Denis Istomin; 6–4, 6–2	(United States) Reilly Opelka	(Germany) Dominik Köpfer (United States) Bjorn Fratangelo	(United States) JC Aragone (United States) Donald Young (United States) Noah Rubin (Belgium) Ruben Bemelmans
September 3	Oracle Challenger Series – Chicago; Chicago, United States; Hard – $150,000+H – 32S/32Q/16D; Singles – Doubles	(United Kingdom) Luke Bambridge (United Kingdom) Neal Skupski; 6–3, 6–4	(India) Leander Paes (Mexico) Miguel Ángel Reyes-Varela	(Germany) Dominik Köpfer (United States) Bjorn Fratangelo	(United States) JC Aragone (United States) Donald Young (United States) Noah Rubin (Belgium) Ruben Bemelmans
September 3	AON Open Challenger; Genoa, Italy; Clay – €127,000+H – 32S/32Q/16D; Singles – Doubles	(Italy) Lorenzo Sonego; 6–2, 6–1	(Germany) Dustin Brown	(Argentina) Federico Delbonis (Brazil) Thomaz Bellucci	(Italy) Stefano Travaglia (Poland) Hubert Hurkacz (Czech Republic) Lukáš Rosol (Chile) Cristian Garín
September 3	AON Open Challenger; Genoa, Italy; Clay – €127,000+H – 32S/32Q/16D; Singles – Doubles	(Germany) Kevin Krawietz (Germany) Andreas Mies; 6–2, 3–6, [10–2]	(Slovakia) Martin Kližan (Slovakia) Filip Polášek	(Argentina) Federico Delbonis (Brazil) Thomaz Bellucci	(Italy) Stefano Travaglia (Poland) Hubert Hurkacz (Czech Republic) Lukáš Rosol (Chile) Cristian Garín
September 3	Copa Sevilla; Seville, Spain; Clay – €64,000+H – 32S/32Q/16D; Singles – Doubles	(Belgium) Kimmer Coppejans; 7–6^{(7–2)}, 6–1	(Slovakia) Alex Molčan	(Bosnia and Herzegovina) Tomislav Brkić (Serbia) Peđa Krstin	(France) Kenny de Schepper (Spain) Sergio Gutiérrez Ferrol (Lithuania) Laurynas Grigelis (Argentina) Facundo Argüello
September 3	Copa Sevilla; Seville, Spain; Clay – €64,000+H – 32S/32Q/16D; Singles – Doubles	(Spain) Gerard Granollers (Spain) Pedro Martínez; 6–0, 6–2	(Spain) Daniel Gimeno Traver (Spain) Ricardo Ojeda Lara	(Bosnia and Herzegovina) Tomislav Brkić (Serbia) Peđa Krstin	(France) Kenny de Schepper (Spain) Sergio Gutiérrez Ferrol (Lithuania) Laurynas Grigelis (Argentina) Facundo Argüello
September 3	Cassis Open Provence; Cassis, France; Hard – €64,000 – 32S/32Q/16D; Singles – Doubles	(France) Enzo Couacaud; 6–2, 6–3	(France) Ugo Humbert	(Spain) Adrián Menéndez Maceiras (United Kingdom) James Ward	(Netherlands) Scott Griekspoor (France) Antoine Hoang (Germany) Oscar Otte (France) Mathias Bourgue
September 3	Cassis Open Provence; Cassis, France; Hard – €64,000 – 32S/32Q/16D; Singles – Doubles	(Australia) Matt Reid (Ukraine) Sergiy Stakhovsky; 6–2, 6–3	(Switzerland) Marc-Andrea Hüsler (Portugal) Gonçalo Oliveira	(Spain) Adrián Menéndez Maceiras (United Kingdom) James Ward	(Netherlands) Scott Griekspoor (France) Antoine Hoang (Germany) Oscar Otte (France) Mathias Bourgue
September 3	International Challenger Zhangjiagang; Zhangjiagang, China; Hard – $50,000+H – 32S/32Q/16D; Singles – Doubles	(Japan) Yasutaka Uchiyama; 6–2, 6–2	(Chinese Taipei) Jason Jung	(Kazakhstan) Alexander Bublik (Serbia) Miomir Kecmanović	(Australia) Akira Santillan (South Korea) Chung Yun-seong (Belarus) Uladzimir Ignatik (China) Wu Yibing
September 3	International Challenger Zhangjiagang; Zhangjiagang, China; Hard – $50,000+H – 32S/32Q/16D; Singles – Doubles	(China) Gong Maoxin (China) Zhang Ze; Walkover	(Australia) Bradley Mousley (Australia) Akira Santillan	(Kazakhstan) Alexander Bublik (Serbia) Miomir Kecmanović	(Australia) Akira Santillan (South Korea) Chung Yun-seong (Belarus) Uladzimir Ignatik (China) Wu Yibing
September 10	Pekao Szczecin Open; Szczecin, Poland; Clay – €127,000+H – 32S/32Q/16D; Singles – Doubles	(Argentina) Guido Andreozzi; 6–4, 4–6, 6–3	(Spain) Alejandro Davidovich Fokina	(Germany) Rudolf Molleker (Argentina) Facundo Argüello	(Italy) Gianluigi Quinzi (Italy) Roberto Marcora (Russia) Alexey Vatutin (Brazil) Rogério Dutra Silva
September 10	Pekao Szczecin Open; Szczecin, Poland; Clay – €127,000+H – 32S/32Q/16D; Singles – Doubles	(Poland) Karol Drzewiecki (Slovakia) Filip Polášek; 6–3, 6–4	(Argentina) Guido Andreozzi (Argentina) Guillermo Durán	(Germany) Rudolf Molleker (Argentina) Facundo Argüello	(Italy) Gianluigi Quinzi (Italy) Roberto Marcora (Russia) Alexey Vatutin (Brazil) Rogério Dutra Silva
September 10	Banja Luka Challenger; Banja Luka, Bosnia and Herzegovina; Clay – €85,000+H – 32S/32Q/16D; Singles – Doubles	(Italy) Alessandro Giannessi; 6–7^{(6–8)}, 6–4, 6–4	(Argentina) Carlos Berlocq	(Italy) Filippo Baldi (France) Johan Tatlot	(Argentina) Juan Ignacio Londero (Lithuania) Laurynas Grigelis (Spain) Daniel Gimeno Traver (Spain) Pablo Andújar
September 10	Banja Luka Challenger; Banja Luka, Bosnia and Herzegovina; Clay – €85,000+H – 32S/32Q/16D; Singles – Doubles	(Slovakia) Andrej Martin (Chile) Hans Podlipnik Castillo; 7–5, 4–6, [10–7]	(Lithuania) Laurynas Grigelis (Italy) Alessandro Motti	(Italy) Filippo Baldi (France) Johan Tatlot	(Argentina) Juan Ignacio Londero (Lithuania) Laurynas Grigelis (Spain) Daniel Gimeno Traver (Spain) Pablo Andújar
September 10	Amex-Istanbul Challenger; Istanbul, Turkey; Hard – $75,000+H – 32S/32Q/16D; Singles – Doubles	(France) Corentin Moutet; 6–3, 6–4	(France) Quentin Halys	(Italy) Thomas Fabbiano (France) Antoine Hoang	(Italy) Matteo Viola (Netherlands) Tallon Griekspoor (Austria) Lucas Miedler (Turkey) Cem İlkel
September 10	Amex-Istanbul Challenger; Istanbul, Turkey; Hard – $75,000+H – 32S/32Q/16D; Singles – Doubles	(Australia) Rameez Junaid (India) Purav Raja; 7–6^{(7–4)}, 4–6, [10–7]	(Kazakhstan) Timur Khabibulin (Ukraine) Vladyslav Manafov	(Italy) Thomas Fabbiano (France) Antoine Hoang	(Italy) Matteo Viola (Netherlands) Tallon Griekspoor (Austria) Lucas Miedler (Turkey) Cem İlkel
September 10	Shanghai Challenger; Shanghai, China; Hard – $75,000 – 32S/32Q/16D; Singles – Doubles	(Slovenia) Blaž Kavčič; 6–1, 7–6^{(7–1)}	(Japan) Hiroki Moriya	(Serbia) Miomir Kecmanović (China) Li Zhe	(China) Wu Di (Italy) Alessandro Bega (Kazakhstan) Alexander Bublik (Bosnia and Herzegovina) Aldin Šetkić
September 10	Shanghai Challenger; Shanghai, China; Hard – $75,000 – 32S/32Q/16D; Singles – Doubles	(China) Gong Maoxin (China) Zhang Ze; 6–4, 3–6, [10–4]	(China) Hua Runhao (China) Zhang Zhizhen	(Serbia) Miomir Kecmanović (China) Li Zhe	(China) Wu Di (Italy) Alessandro Bega (Kazakhstan) Alexander Bublik (Bosnia and Herzegovina) Aldin Šetkić
September 10	Cary Challenger; Cary, United States; Hard – $50,000+H – 32S/32Q/16D; Singles – Doubles	(Australia) James Duckworth; 7–6^{(7–4)}, 6–3	(United States) Reilly Opelka	(United States) Bjorn Fratangelo (Japan) Kaichi Uchida	(Colombia) Alejandro González (Belgium) Joris De Loore (Germany) Dominik Köpfer (Dominican Republic) José Hernández-Fernández
September 10	Cary Challenger; Cary, United States; Hard – $50,000+H – 32S/32Q/16D; Singles – Doubles	(United States) Evan King (United States) Hunter Reese; 6–4, 7–6^{(8–6)}	(France) Fabrice Martin (France) Hugo Nys	(United States) Bjorn Fratangelo (Japan) Kaichi Uchida	(Colombia) Alejandro González (Belgium) Joris De Loore (Germany) Dominik Köpfer (Dominican Republic) José Hernández-Fernández
September 17	OEC Kaohsiung; Kaohsiung, Taiwan; Hard (i) – $150,000+H – 32S/32Q/16D; Singles – Doubles	(France) Gaël Monfils; 6–4, 2–6, 6–1	(South Korea) Kwon Soon-woo	(South Korea) Lee Duck-hee (Tunisia) Malek Jaziri	(Latvia) Ernests Gulbis (Portugal) Frederico Ferreira Silva (Canada) Brayden Schnur (Austria) Jurij Rodionov
September 17	OEC Kaohsiung; Kaohsiung, Taiwan; Hard (i) – $150,000+H – 32S/32Q/16D; Singles – Doubles	(Chinese Taipei) Hsieh Cheng-peng (Chinese Taipei) Yang Tsung-hua; 6–7^{(3–7)}, 6–2, [10–8]	(Chinese Taipei) Hsu Yu-hsiou (Chinese Taipei) Jimmy Wang	(South Korea) Lee Duck-hee (Tunisia) Malek Jaziri	(Latvia) Ernests Gulbis (Portugal) Frederico Ferreira Silva (Canada) Brayden Schnur (Austria) Jurij Rodionov
September 17	Columbus Challenger; Columbus, United States; Hard (i) – $75,000 – 32S/32Q/16D; Singles – Doubles	(United States) Michael Mmoh; 6–3, 7–6^{(7–4)}	(Australia) Jordan Thompson	(Ecuador) Roberto Quiroz (Denmark) Mikael Torpegaard	(Germany) Dominik Köpfer (Australia) Luke Saville (Australia) Alexei Popyrin (United States) Thai-Son Kwiatkowski
September 17	Columbus Challenger; Columbus, United States; Hard (i) – $75,000 – 32S/32Q/16D; Singles – Doubles	(United States) Tommy Paul (Canada) Peter Polansky; 6–3, 6–3	(Ecuador) Gonzalo Escobar (Ecuador) Roberto Quiroz	(Ecuador) Roberto Quiroz (Denmark) Mikael Torpegaard	(Germany) Dominik Köpfer (Australia) Luke Saville (Australia) Alexei Popyrin (United States) Thai-Son Kwiatkowski
September 17	Thindown Challenger Biella; Biella, Italy; Clay – €43,000+H – 32S/32Q/16D; Singles – Doubles	(Argentina) Federico Delbonis; 6–4, 6–3	(Italy) Stefano Napolitano	(Italy) Stefano Travaglia (Brazil) Thiago Monteiro	(Spain) Roberto Carballés Baena (Italy) Paolo Lorenzi (Argentina) Marco Trungelliti (Argentina) Facundo Argüello
September 17	Thindown Challenger Biella; Biella, Italy; Clay – €43,000+H – 32S/32Q/16D; Singles – Doubles	(Brazil) Fabrício Neis (Spain) David Vega Hernández; 6–4, 6–4	(Australia) Rameez Junaid (India) Purav Raja	(Italy) Stefano Travaglia (Brazil) Thiago Monteiro	(Spain) Roberto Carballés Baena (Italy) Paolo Lorenzi (Argentina) Marco Trungelliti (Argentina) Facundo Argüello
September 17	Sibiu Open; Sibiu, Romania; Clay – €43,000+H – 32S/32Q/16D; Singles – Doubles	(Romania) Dragoș Dima; 6–3, 6–2	(Netherlands) Jelle Sels	(Serbia) Laslo Đere (Spain) Pedro Martínez	(Czech Republic) Lukáš Rosol (Spain) Javier Barranco Cosano (Portugal) Pedro Sousa (Poland) Kamil Majchrzak
September 17	Sibiu Open; Sibiu, Romania; Clay – €43,000+H – 32S/32Q/16D; Singles – Doubles	(Germany) Kevin Krawietz (Germany) Andreas Mies; 6–4, 6–2	(Poland) Tomasz Bednarek (Netherlands) David Pel	(Serbia) Laslo Đere (Spain) Pedro Martínez	(Czech Republic) Lukáš Rosol (Spain) Javier Barranco Cosano (Portugal) Pedro Sousa (Poland) Kamil Majchrzak
September 24	Open d'Orléans; Orléans, France; Hard (i) – €127,000+H – 32S/32Q/16D; Singles – Doubles	(Slovenia) Aljaž Bedene; 4–6, 6–1, 7–6^{(8–6)}	(France) Antoine Hoang	(Italy) Luca Vanni (France) Kenny de Schepper	(Germany) Daniel Brands (Netherlands) Tallon Griekspoor (Sweden) Elias Ymer (Ukraine) Sergiy Stakhovsky
September 24	Open d'Orléans; Orléans, France; Hard (i) – €127,000+H – 32S/32Q/16D; Singles – Doubles	(United Kingdom) Luke Bambridge (United Kingdom) Jonny O'Mara; 6–2, 6–4	(Germany) Yannick Maden (Austria) Tristan-Samuel Weissborn	(Italy) Luca Vanni (France) Kenny de Schepper	(Germany) Daniel Brands (Netherlands) Tallon Griekspoor (Sweden) Elias Ymer (Ukraine) Sergiy Stakhovsky
September 24	Tiburon Challenger; Tiburon, United States; Hard – $100,000 – 32S/32Q/16D; Singles – Doubles	(United States) Michael Mmoh; 6–3, 7–5	(Spain) Marcel Granollers	(United States) Noah Rubin (Australia) James Duckworth	(Australia) John-Patrick Smith (United States) Christopher Eubanks (United States) Tommy Paul (El Salvador) Marcelo Arévalo
September 24	Tiburon Challenger; Tiburon, United States; Hard – $100,000 – 32S/32Q/16D; Singles – Doubles	(Mexico) Hans Hach Verdugo (Australia) Luke Saville; 6–3, 6–2	(Spain) Gerard Granollers (Spain) Pedro Martínez	(United States) Noah Rubin (Australia) James Duckworth	(Australia) John-Patrick Smith (United States) Christopher Eubanks (United States) Tommy Paul (El Salvador) Marcelo Arévalo

=== October ===
Week of	Tournament	Champions	Runners-up	Semifinalists	Quarterfinalists
October 1	Monterrey Challenger; Monterrey, Mexico; Hard – $150,000+H – 32S/32Q/16D; Singles – Doubles	(Spain) David Ferrer; 6–3, 6–4	(Croatia) Ivo Karlović	(United States) Ernesto Escobedo (Colombia) Santiago Giraldo	(Spain) Marcel Granollers (Austria) Sebastian Ofner (United States) Bjorn Fratangelo (Austria) Gerald Melzer
October 1	Monterrey Challenger; Monterrey, Mexico; Hard – $150,000+H – 32S/32Q/16D; Singles – Doubles	(El Salvador) Marcelo Arévalo (India) Jeevan Nedunchezhiyan; 6–1, 6–4	(India) Leander Paes (Mexico) Miguel Ángel Reyes-Varela	(United States) Ernesto Escobedo (Colombia) Santiago Giraldo	(Spain) Marcel Granollers (Austria) Sebastian Ofner (United States) Bjorn Fratangelo (Austria) Gerald Melzer
October 1	Stockton Challenger; Stockton, United States; Hard – $100,000 – 32S/32Q/16D; Singles – Doubles	(South Africa) Lloyd Harris; 6–2, 6–2	(Australia) Marc Polmans	(Australia) Jordan Thompson (France) Maxime Janvier	(United States) Noah Rubin (United States) Christopher Eubanks (United Kingdom) Liam Broady (Barbados) Darian King
October 1	Stockton Challenger; Stockton, United States; Hard – $100,000 – 32S/32Q/16D; Singles – Doubles	(Barbados) Darian King (United States) Noah Rubin; 6–3, 6–4	(Thailand) Sanchai Ratiwatana (Indonesia) Christopher Rungkat	(Australia) Jordan Thompson (France) Maxime Janvier	(United States) Noah Rubin (United States) Christopher Eubanks (United Kingdom) Liam Broady (Barbados) Darian King
October 1	Firenze Tennis Cup; Florence, Italy; Clay – €64,000+H – 32S/32Q/16D; Singles – Doubles	(Spain) Pablo Andújar; 7–5, 6–3	(Argentina) Marco Trungelliti	(Italy) Lorenzo Sonego (Spain) Roberto Carballés Baena	(Italy) Filippo Baldi (Italy) Lorenzo Giustino (Spain) Sergio Gutiérrez Ferrol (Italy) Andrea Pellegrino
October 1	Firenze Tennis Cup; Florence, Italy; Clay – €64,000+H – 32S/32Q/16D; Singles – Doubles	(Australia) Rameez Junaid (Netherlands) David Pel; 7–5, 3–6, [10–7]	(Italy) Filippo Baldi (Italy) Salvatore Caruso	(Italy) Lorenzo Sonego (Spain) Roberto Carballés Baena	(Italy) Filippo Baldi (Italy) Lorenzo Giustino (Spain) Sergio Gutiérrez Ferrol (Italy) Andrea Pellegrino
October 1	Almaty Challenger; Almaty, Kazakhstan; Hard – $50,000+H – 32S/32Q/16D; Singles – Doubles	(Uzbekistan) Denis Istomin; 6–7^{(4–7)}, 7–6^{(7–5)}, 6–2	(Serbia) Nikola Milojević	(Czech Republic) Lukáš Rosol (Bosnia and Herzegovina) Mirza Bašić	(Serbia) Miomir Kecmanović (Germany) Tobias Kamke (Ukraine) Illya Marchenko (Netherlands) Scott Griekspoor
October 1	Almaty Challenger; Almaty, Kazakhstan; Hard – $50,000+H – 32S/32Q/16D; Singles – Doubles	(Czech Republic) Zdeněk Kolář (Czech Republic) Lukáš Rosol; 6–3, 6–1	(Russia) Evgeny Karlovskiy (Kazakhstan) Timur Khabibulin	(Czech Republic) Lukáš Rosol (Bosnia and Herzegovina) Mirza Bašić	(Serbia) Miomir Kecmanović (Germany) Tobias Kamke (Ukraine) Illya Marchenko (Netherlands) Scott Griekspoor
October 1	São Paulo Challenger de Tênis; Campinas, Brazil; Clay – $50,000+H – 32S/32Q/16D; Singles – Doubles	(Chile) Cristian Garín; 6–3, 6–4	(Argentina) Federico Delbonis	(Argentina) Facundo Bagnis (Brazil) Thiago Monteiro	(Uruguay) Martín Cuevas (Brazil) Thiago Seyboth Wild (Brazil) Thomaz Bellucci (Argentina) Carlos Berlocq
October 1	São Paulo Challenger de Tênis; Campinas, Brazil; Clay – $50,000+H – 32S/32Q/16D; Singles – Doubles	(Bolivia) Hugo Dellien (Argentina) Guillermo Durán; 7–5, 6–4	(Argentina) Franco Agamenone (Brazil) Fernando Romboli	(Argentina) Facundo Bagnis (Brazil) Thiago Monteiro	(Uruguay) Martín Cuevas (Brazil) Thiago Seyboth Wild (Brazil) Thomaz Bellucci (Argentina) Carlos Berlocq
October 8	Milex Open; Santo Domingo, Dominican Republic; Clay – $125,000+H – 32S/32Q/16D; Singles – Doubles	(Chile) Cristian Garín; 6–4, 5–7, 6–4	(Argentina) Federico Delbonis	(Argentina) Carlos Berlocq (Serbia) Peđa Krstin	(Dominican Republic) José Hernández-Fernández (Croatia) Nino Serdarušić (Austria) Jürgen Melzer (Italy) Paolo Lorenzi
October 8	Milex Open; Santo Domingo, Dominican Republic; Clay – $125,000+H – 32S/32Q/16D; Singles – Doubles	(India) Leander Paes (Mexico) Miguel Ángel Reyes-Varela; 4–6, 6–3, [10–5]	(Uruguay) Ariel Behar (Ecuador) Roberto Quiroz	(Argentina) Carlos Berlocq (Serbia) Peđa Krstin	(Dominican Republic) José Hernández-Fernández (Croatia) Nino Serdarušić (Austria) Jürgen Melzer (Italy) Paolo Lorenzi
October 8	Fairfield Challenger; Fairfield, United States; Hard – $100,000 – 32S/32Q/16D; Singles – Doubles	(United States) Bjorn Fratangelo; 6–4, 6–3	(Australia) Alex Bolt	(Norway) Casper Ruud (Spain) Adrián Menéndez Maceiras	(Australia) Jordan Thompson (Germany) Sebastian Fanselow (United States) J. J. Wolf (South Africa) Lloyd Harris
October 8	Fairfield Challenger; Fairfield, United States; Hard – $100,000 – 32S/32Q/16D; Singles – Doubles	(Thailand) Sanchai Ratiwatana (Indonesia) Christopher Rungkat; 6–0, 7–6^{(11–9)}	(Finland) Harri Heliövaara (Switzerland) Henri Laaksonen	(Norway) Casper Ruud (Spain) Adrián Menéndez Maceiras	(Australia) Jordan Thompson (Germany) Sebastian Fanselow (United States) J. J. Wolf (South Africa) Lloyd Harris
October 8	Sparkassen ATP Challenger; Ortisei, Italy; Hard (i) – €64,000 – 32S/32Q/16D; Singles – Doubles	(France) Ugo Humbert; 6–4, 6–2	(France) Pierre-Hugues Herbert	(Austria) Dennis Novak (France) Grégoire Barrère	(Lithuania) Ričardas Berankis (Italy) Simone Bolelli (France) Constant Lestienne (Germany) Mats Moraing
October 8	Sparkassen ATP Challenger; Ortisei, Italy; Hard (i) – €64,000 – 32S/32Q/16D; Singles – Doubles	(Belgium) Sander Gillé (Belgium) Joran Vliegen; 3–6, 6–3, [10–3]	(India) Purav Raja (Croatia) Antonio Šančić	(Austria) Dennis Novak (France) Grégoire Barrère	(Lithuania) Ričardas Berankis (Italy) Simone Bolelli (France) Constant Lestienne (Germany) Mats Moraing
October 8	Tashkent Challenger; Tashkent, Uzbekistan; Hard – $75,000 – 32S/32Q/16D; Singles – Doubles	(Canada) Félix Auger-Aliassime; 6–3, 6–2	(Poland) Kamil Majchrzak	(Germany) Tobias Kamke (Belarus) Egor Gerasimov	(Bosnia and Herzegovina) Mirza Bašić (Russia) Evgeny Karlovskiy (France) Mathias Bourgue (Uzbekistan) Denis Istomin
October 8	Tashkent Challenger; Tashkent, Uzbekistan; Hard – $75,000 – 32S/32Q/16D; Singles – Doubles	(Uzbekistan) Sanjar Fayziev (Uzbekistan) Jurabek Karimov; 6–2, 6–7^{(3–7)}, [11–9]	(Italy) Federico Gaio (Spain) Enrique López Pérez	(Germany) Tobias Kamke (Belarus) Egor Gerasimov	(Bosnia and Herzegovina) Mirza Bašić (Russia) Evgeny Karlovskiy (France) Mathias Bourgue (Uzbekistan) Denis Istomin
October 8	Sánchez-Casal Mapfre Cup; Barcelona, Spain; Clay – €43,000+H – 32S/32Q/16D; Singles – Doubles	(Spain) Roberto Carballés Baena; 1–6, 6–3, 6–0	(Spain) Pedro Martínez	(Argentina) Marco Trungelliti (Italy) Filippo Baldi	(Italy) Alessandro Giannessi (Portugal) Pedro Sousa (Serbia) Miljan Zekić (Italy) Lorenzo Giustino
October 8	Sánchez-Casal Mapfre Cup; Barcelona, Spain; Clay – €43,000+H – 32S/32Q/16D; Singles – Doubles	(Brazil) Marcelo Demoliner (Spain) David Vega Hernández; 7–6^{(7–3)}, 6–3	(Australia) Rameez Junaid (Netherlands) David Pel	(Argentina) Marco Trungelliti (Italy) Filippo Baldi	(Italy) Alessandro Giannessi (Portugal) Pedro Sousa (Serbia) Miljan Zekić (Italy) Lorenzo Giustino
October 15	Ningbo Challenger; Ningbo, China; Hard – $150,000 – 32S/32Q/16D; Singles – Doubles	(Italy) Thomas Fabbiano; 7–6^{(7–4)}, 4–6, 6–3	(India) Prajnesh Gunneswaran	(Serbia) Miomir Kecmanović (Moldova) Radu Albot	(Norway) Viktor Durasovic (South Korea) Chung Yun-seong (Italy) Federico Gaio (Japan) Tatsuma Ito
October 15	Ningbo Challenger; Ningbo, China; Hard – $150,000 – 32S/32Q/16D; Singles – Doubles	(China) Gong Maoxin (China) Zhang Ze; 7–5, 2–6, [10–5]	(Chinese Taipei) Hsieh Cheng-peng (Indonesia) Christopher Rungkat	(Serbia) Miomir Kecmanović (Moldova) Radu Albot	(Norway) Viktor Durasovic (South Korea) Chung Yun-seong (Italy) Federico Gaio (Japan) Tatsuma Ito
October 15	Calgary National Bank Challenger; Calgary, Canada; Hard (i) – $75,000+H – 32S/32Q/16D; Singles – Doubles	(Croatia) Ivo Karlović; 7–6^{(7–3)}, 6–3	(Australia) Jordan Thompson	(Norway) Casper Ruud (Croatia) Borna Gojo	(France) Enzo Couacaud (Canada) Brayden Schnur (Canada) Filip Peliwo (Ecuador) Roberto Quiroz
October 15	Calgary National Bank Challenger; Calgary, Canada; Hard (i) – $75,000+H – 32S/32Q/16D; Singles – Doubles	(United States) Robert Galloway (United States) Nathan Pasha; 6–4, 4–6, [10–6]	(Australia) Matt Reid (Australia) John-Patrick Smith	(Norway) Casper Ruud (Croatia) Borna Gojo	(France) Enzo Couacaud (Canada) Brayden Schnur (Canada) Filip Peliwo (Ecuador) Roberto Quiroz
October 15	Wolffkran Open; Ismaning, Germany; Carpet (i) – €43,000+H – 32S/32Q/16D; Singles – Doubles	(Italy) Filippo Baldi; 6–4, 6–4	(France) Gleb Sakharov	(Germany) Johannes Härteis (France) Ugo Humbert	(Germany) Daniel Masur (Germany) Jeremy Jahn (Germany) Kevin Krawietz (Italy) Matteo Viola
October 15	Wolffkran Open; Ismaning, Germany; Carpet (i) – €43,000+H – 32S/32Q/16D; Singles – Doubles	(India) Purav Raja (Croatia) Antonio Šančić; 5–7, 6–4, [10–5]	(Australia) Rameez Junaid (Netherlands) David Pel	(Germany) Johannes Härteis (France) Ugo Humbert	(Germany) Daniel Masur (Germany) Jeremy Jahn (Germany) Kevin Krawietz (Italy) Matteo Viola
October 22	Brest Challenger; Brest, France; Hard (i) – €106,000+H – 32S/32Q/16D; Singles – Doubles	(Poland) Hubert Hurkacz; 7–5, 6–1	(Lithuania) Ričardas Berankis	(Italy) Stefano Travaglia (Spain) Roberto Carballés Baena	(France) Julien Benneteau (France) Benjamin Bonzi (Italy) Lorenzo Sonego (Spain) Jaume Munar
October 22	Brest Challenger; Brest, France; Hard (i) – €106,000+H – 32S/32Q/16D; Singles – Doubles	(Belgium) Sander Gillé (Belgium) Joran Vliegen; 3–6, 6–4, [10–2]	(India) Leander Paes (Mexico) Miguel Ángel Reyes-Varela	(Italy) Stefano Travaglia (Spain) Roberto Carballés Baena	(France) Julien Benneteau (France) Benjamin Bonzi (Italy) Lorenzo Sonego (Spain) Jaume Munar
October 22	Las Vegas Challenger; Las Vegas, United States; Hard – $50,000+H – 32S/32Q/16D; Singles – Doubles	(Australia) Thanasi Kokkinakis; 6–4, 6–4	(Slovenia) Blaž Rola	(Norway) Casper Ruud (Australia) John-Patrick Smith	(Barbados) Darian King (Poland) Kamil Majchrzak (Chinese Taipei) Jason Jung (France) Mathias Bourgue
October 22	Las Vegas Challenger; Las Vegas, United States; Hard – $50,000+H – 32S/32Q/16D; Singles – Doubles	(El Salvador) Marcelo Arévalo (Venezuela) Roberto Maytín; 6–3, 6–3	(United States) Robert Galloway (United States) Nathan Pasha	(Norway) Casper Ruud (Australia) John-Patrick Smith	(Barbados) Darian King (Poland) Kamil Majchrzak (Chinese Taipei) Jason Jung (France) Mathias Bourgue
October 22	Latrobe City Traralgon ATP Challenger; Traralgon, Australia; Hard – $75,000 – 32S/32Q/16D; Singles – Doubles	(Australia) Jordan Thompson; 6–3, 6–4	(Japan) Yoshihito Nishioka	(Australia) Marc Polmans (Australia) Alex Bolt	(United Kingdom) Brydan Klein (Australia) Aleksandar Vukic (Germany) Sebastian Fanselow (Japan) Yasutaka Uchiyama
October 22	Latrobe City Traralgon ATP Challenger; Traralgon, Australia; Hard – $75,000 – 32S/32Q/16D; Singles – Doubles	(Australia) Jeremy Beale (Australia) Marc Polmans; 6–2, 6–4	(Australia) Max Purcell (Australia) Luke Saville	(Australia) Marc Polmans (Australia) Alex Bolt	(United Kingdom) Brydan Klein (Australia) Aleksandar Vukic (Germany) Sebastian Fanselow (Japan) Yasutaka Uchiyama
October 22	Lima Challenger; Lima, Peru; Clay – $50,000+H – 32S/32Q/16D; Singles – Doubles	(Chile) Cristian Garín; 6–4, 6–4	(Portugal) Pedro Sousa	(Argentina) Facundo Argüello (Brazil) Thiago Monteiro	(Argentina) Juan Ignacio Londero (Dominican Republic) José Hernández-Fernández (Bolivia) Hugo Dellien (Argentina) Federico Delbonis
October 22	Lima Challenger; Lima, Peru; Clay – $50,000+H – 32S/32Q/16D; Singles – Doubles	(Argentina) Guido Andreozzi (Argentina) Guillermo Durán; 2–6, 7–6^{(7–5)}, [10–5]	(Uruguay) Ariel Behar (Ecuador) Gonzalo Escobar	(Argentina) Facundo Argüello (Brazil) Thiago Monteiro	(Argentina) Juan Ignacio Londero (Dominican Republic) José Hernández-Fernández (Bolivia) Hugo Dellien (Argentina) Federico Delbonis
October 22	Liuzhou International Challenger; Liuzhou, China; Hard – $50,000+H – 32S/32Q/16D; Singles – Doubles	(Moldova) Radu Albot; 6–2, 4–6, 6–3	(Serbia) Miomir Kecmanović	(India) Prajnesh Gunneswaran (Slovenia) Blaž Kavčič	(China) Wu Di (Italy) Thomas Fabbiano (China) Li Zhe (Spain) Alejandro Davidovich Fokina
October 22	Liuzhou International Challenger; Liuzhou, China; Hard – $50,000+H – 32S/32Q/16D; Singles – Doubles	(China) Gong Maoxin (China) Zhang Ze; 6–3, 2–6, [10–3]	(Chinese Taipei) Hsieh Cheng-peng (Indonesia) Christopher Rungkat	(India) Prajnesh Gunneswaran (Slovenia) Blaž Kavčič	(China) Wu Di (Italy) Thomas Fabbiano (China) Li Zhe (Spain) Alejandro Davidovich Fokina
October 29	Shenzhen Longhua Open; Shenzhen, China; Hard – $75,000+H – 32S/32Q/16D; Singles – Doubles	(Serbia) Miomir Kecmanović; 6–2, 2–6, 6–3	(Slovenia) Blaž Kavčič	(Kazakhstan) Aleksandr Nedovyesov (Spain) Alejandro Davidovich Fokina	(China) Zhang Ze (Egypt) Mohamed Safwat (India) Sasikumar Mukund (Hungary) Máté Valkusz
October 29	Shenzhen Longhua Open; Shenzhen, China; Hard – $75,000+H – 32S/32Q/16D; Singles – Doubles	(Chinese Taipei) Hsieh Cheng-peng (Indonesia) Christopher Rungkat; 6–4, 6–2	(India) Sriram Balaji (India) Jeevan Nedunchezhiyan	(Kazakhstan) Aleksandr Nedovyesov (Spain) Alejandro Davidovich Fokina	(China) Zhang Ze (Egypt) Mohamed Safwat (India) Sasikumar Mukund (Hungary) Máté Valkusz
October 29	Canberra Tennis International; Canberra, Australia; Hard – $75,000 – 32S/32Q/16D; Singles – Doubles	(Australia) Jordan Thompson; 6–1, 5–7, 6–4	(Spain) Nicola Kuhn	(France) Maxime Janvier (Japan) Yoshihito Nishioka	(Australia) Jacob Grills (Australia) Blake Ellis (Australia) Akira Santillan (Japan) Yosuke Watanuki
October 29	Canberra Tennis International; Canberra, Australia; Hard – $75,000 – 32S/32Q/16D; Singles – Doubles	(United Kingdom) Evan Hoyt (Chinese Taipei) Wu Tung-lin; 7–6^{(7–5)}, 5–7, [10–8]	(Australia) Jeremy Beale (Australia) Thomas Fancutt	(France) Maxime Janvier (Japan) Yoshihito Nishioka	(Australia) Jacob Grills (Australia) Blake Ellis (Australia) Akira Santillan (Japan) Yosuke Watanuki
October 29	Charlottesville Men's Pro Challenger; Charlottesville, United States; Hard (i) – $75,000 – 32S/32Q/16D; Singles – Doubles	(United States) Tommy Paul; 6–2, 6–2	(Canada) Peter Polansky	(United States) Bradley Klahn (United States) Thai-Son Kwiatkowski	(United States) Bjorn Fratangelo (Croatia) Ivo Karlović (Netherlands) Jelle Sels (United States) Michael Mmoh
October 29	Charlottesville Men's Pro Challenger; Charlottesville, United States; Hard (i) – $75,000 – 32S/32Q/16D; Singles – Doubles	(Finland) Harri Heliövaara (Switzerland) Henri Laaksonen; 6–3, 6–4	(Japan) Toshihide Matsui (Denmark) Frederik Nielsen	(United States) Bradley Klahn (United States) Thai-Son Kwiatkowski	(United States) Bjorn Fratangelo (Croatia) Ivo Karlović (Netherlands) Jelle Sels (United States) Michael Mmoh
October 29	Bauer Watertechnology Cup; Eckental, Germany; Carpet (i) – €43,000+H – 32S/32Q/16D; Singles – Doubles	(France) Antoine Hoang; 7–5, 6–3	(Belgium) Ruben Bemelmans	(Russia) Evgeny Donskoy (France) Gleb Sakharov	(Germany) Daniel Masur (France) Albano Olivetti (Germany) Matthias Bachinger (Czech Republic) Lukáš Rosol
October 29	Bauer Watertechnology Cup; Eckental, Germany; Carpet (i) – €43,000+H – 32S/32Q/16D; Singles – Doubles	(Germany) Kevin Krawietz (Germany) Andreas Mies; 6–1, 6–4	(France) Hugo Nys (United Kingdom) Jonny O'Mara	(Russia) Evgeny Donskoy (France) Gleb Sakharov	(Germany) Daniel Masur (France) Albano Olivetti (Germany) Matthias Bachinger (Czech Republic) Lukáš Rosol
October 29	Challenger Ciudad de Guayaquil; Guayaquil, Ecuador; Clay – $50,000+H – 32S/32Q/16D; Singles – Doubles	(Argentina) Guido Andreozzi; 7–5, 1–6, 6–4	(Portugal) Pedro Sousa	(Belgium) Arthur De Greef (Colombia) Santiago Giraldo	(Uruguay) Pablo Cuevas (Argentina) Facundo Argüello (Serbia) Peđa Krstin (Argentina) Juan Ignacio Londero
October 29	Challenger Ciudad de Guayaquil; Guayaquil, Ecuador; Clay – $50,000+H – 32S/32Q/16D; Singles – Doubles	(Argentina) Guillermo Durán (Ecuador) Roberto Quiroz; 6–3, 6–2	(Brazil) Thiago Monteiro (Brazil) Fabrício Neis	(Belgium) Arthur De Greef (Colombia) Santiago Giraldo	(Uruguay) Pablo Cuevas (Argentina) Facundo Argüello (Serbia) Peđa Krstin (Argentina) Juan Ignacio Londero

=== November ===
Week of	Tournament	Champions	Runners-up	Semifinalists	Quarterfinalists
November 5	Slovak Open; Bratislava, Slovakia; Hard (i) – €106,000+H – 32S/32Q/16D; Singles – Doubles	(Kazakhstan) Alexander Bublik; 6–4, 6–4	(Czech Republic) Lukáš Rosol	(Austria) Dennis Novak (Germany) Matthias Bachinger	(Belarus) Egor Gerasimov (Austria) Sebastian Ofner (Ukraine) Sergiy Stakhovsky (Russia) Evgeny Donskoy
November 5	Slovak Open; Bratislava, Slovakia; Hard (i) – €106,000+H – 32S/32Q/16D; Singles – Doubles	(Ukraine) Denys Molchanov (Slovakia) Igor Zelenay; 6–2, 3–6, [11–9]	(India) Ramkumar Ramanathan (Belarus) Andrei Vasilevski	(Austria) Dennis Novak (Germany) Matthias Bachinger	(Belarus) Egor Gerasimov (Austria) Sebastian Ofner (Ukraine) Sergiy Stakhovsky (Russia) Evgeny Donskoy
November 5	Internationaux de Tennis de Vendée; Mouilleron-le-Captif, France; Hard (i) – €85,000+H – 32S/32Q/16D; Singles – Doubles	(Sweden) Elias Ymer; 6–3, 7–6^{(7–5)}	(Germany) Yannick Maden	(Russia) Alexey Vatutin (France) Elliot Benchetrit	(France) Maxime Janvier (Germany) Mats Moraing (France) Quentin Halys (France) Constant Lestienne
November 5	Internationaux de Tennis de Vendée; Mouilleron-le-Captif, France; Hard (i) – €85,000+H – 32S/32Q/16D; Singles – Doubles	(Belgium) Sander Gillé (Belgium) Joran Vliegen; 6–3, 4–6, [10–2]	(Monaco) Romain Arneodo (France) Quentin Halys	(Russia) Alexey Vatutin (France) Elliot Benchetrit	(France) Maxime Janvier (Germany) Mats Moraing (France) Quentin Halys (France) Constant Lestienne
November 5	Knoxville Challenger; Knoxville, United States; Hard (i) – $75,000 – 32S/32Q/16D; Singles – Doubles	(United States) Reilly Opelka; 7–5, 4–6, 7–6^{(7–2)}	(United States) Bjorn Fratangelo	(Serbia) Nikola Milojević (United States) Christopher Eubanks	(Slovenia) Blaž Rola (United States) Michael Mmoh (Russia) Evgeny Karlovskiy (United States) Tim Smyczek
November 5	Knoxville Challenger; Knoxville, United States; Hard (i) – $75,000 – 32S/32Q/16D; Singles – Doubles	(Japan) Toshihide Matsui (Denmark) Frederik Nielsen; 7–6^{(8–6)}, 7–5	(United States) Hunter Reese (United States) Tennys Sandgren	(Serbia) Nikola Milojević (United States) Christopher Eubanks	(Slovenia) Blaž Rola (United States) Michael Mmoh (Russia) Evgeny Karlovskiy (United States) Tim Smyczek
November 5	Uruguay Open; Montevideo, Uruguay; Clay – $75,000+H – 32S/32Q/16D; Singles – Doubles	(Argentina) Guido Pella; 6–3, 3–6, 6–1	(Argentina) Carlos Berlocq	(Spain) Mario Vilella Martínez (Portugal) Pedro Sousa	(Uruguay) Martín Cuevas (Argentina) Facundo Argüello (Spain) Daniel Gimeno Traver (Italy) Lorenzo Giustino
November 5	Uruguay Open; Montevideo, Uruguay; Clay – $75,000+H – 32S/32Q/16D; Singles – Doubles	(Argentina) Guido Andreozzi (Argentina) Guillermo Durán; 7–6^{(7–5)}, 6–4	(Argentina) Facundo Bagnis (Argentina) Andrés Molteni	(Spain) Mario Vilella Martínez (Portugal) Pedro Sousa	(Uruguay) Martín Cuevas (Argentina) Facundo Argüello (Spain) Daniel Gimeno Traver (Italy) Lorenzo Giustino
November 12	Bengaluru Open; Bangalore, India; Hard – $150,000+H – 32S/32Q/16D; Singles – Doubles	(India) Prajnesh Gunneswaran; 6–2, 6–2	(India) Saketh Myneni	(Kazakhstan) Aleksandr Nedovyesov (Canada) Brayden Schnur	(India) Sumit Nagal (Portugal) Frederico Ferreira Silva (India) Sasikumar Mukund (Turkey) Cem İlkel
November 12	Bengaluru Open; Bangalore, India; Hard – $150,000+H – 32S/32Q/16D; Singles – Doubles	(Australia) Max Purcell (Australia) Luke Saville; 7–6^{(7–3)}, 6–3	(India) Purav Raja (Croatia) Antonio Šančić	(Kazakhstan) Aleksandr Nedovyesov (Canada) Brayden Schnur	(India) Sumit Nagal (Portugal) Frederico Ferreira Silva (India) Sasikumar Mukund (Turkey) Cem İlkel
November 12	Oracle Challenger Series – Houston; Houston, United States; Hard – $150,000+H – 32S/32Q/16D; Singles – Doubles	(United States) Bradley Klahn; 7–6^{(7–4)}, 7–6^{(7–4)}	(United States) Roy Smith	(Poland) Kamil Majchrzak (Germany) Dominik Köpfer	(Chinese Taipei) Jason Jung (United States) Thai-Son Kwiatkowski (Croatia) Ivo Karlović (United States) Evan Song
November 12	Oracle Challenger Series – Houston; Houston, United States; Hard – $150,000+H – 32S/32Q/16D; Singles – Doubles	(United States) Austin Krajicek (United States) Nicholas Monroe; 4–6, 7–6^{(7–3)}, [10–5]	(El Salvador) Marcelo Arévalo (United States) James Cerretani	(Poland) Kamil Majchrzak (Germany) Dominik Köpfer	(Chinese Taipei) Jason Jung (United States) Thai-Son Kwiatkowski (Croatia) Ivo Karlović (United States) Evan Song
November 12	JSM Challenger of Champaign–Urbana; Champaign, United States; Hard (i) – $75,000 – 32S/32Q/16D; Singles – Doubles	(United States) Reilly Opelka; 7–6^{(8–6)}, 6–3	(United States) Ryan Shane	(Slovenia) Blaž Rola (United States) Tommy Paul	(Australia) John-Patrick Smith (United States) Sekou Bangoura (France) Tak Khunn Wang (United States) Christopher Eubanks
November 12	JSM Challenger of Champaign–Urbana; Champaign, United States; Hard (i) – $75,000 – 32S/32Q/16D; Singles – Doubles	(Australia) Matt Reid (Australia) John-Patrick Smith; 6–4, 4–6, [10–8]	(Mexico) Hans Hach Verdugo (Venezuela) Luis David Martínez	(Slovenia) Blaž Rola (United States) Tommy Paul	(Australia) John-Patrick Smith (United States) Sekou Bangoura (France) Tak Khunn Wang (United States) Christopher Eubanks
November 12	Challenger de Buenos Aires; Buenos Aires, Argentina; Clay – $50,000+H – 32S/32Q/16D; Singles – Doubles	(Spain) Pablo Andújar; 6–3, 6–1	(Argentina) Pedro Cachin	(Bulgaria) Dimitar Kuzmanov (Argentina) Federico Coria	(Chile) Bastián Malla (Argentina) Facundo Argüello (Brazil) Guilherme Clezar (Serbia) Peđa Krstin
November 12	Challenger de Buenos Aires; Buenos Aires, Argentina; Clay – $50,000+H – 32S/32Q/16D; Singles – Doubles	(Argentina) Guido Andreozzi (Argentina) Guillermo Durán; 6–4, 4–6, [10–3]	(Brazil) Marcelo Demoliner (Argentina) Andrés Molteni	(Bulgaria) Dimitar Kuzmanov (Argentina) Federico Coria	(Chile) Bastián Malla (Argentina) Facundo Argüello (Brazil) Guilherme Clezar (Serbia) Peđa Krstin
November 12	Kobe Challenger; Kobe, Japan; Hard (i) – $50,000+H – 32S/32Q/16D; Singles – Doubles	(Japan) Tatsuma Ito; 3–6, 7–5, 6–3	(Japan) Yosuke Watanuki	(Japan) Yoshihito Nishioka (Japan) Yasutaka Uchiyama	(South Korea) Kwon Soon-woo (Japan) Go Soeda (Japan) Hiroki Moriya (South Korea) Chung Yun-seong
November 12	Kobe Challenger; Kobe, Japan; Hard (i) – $50,000+H – 32S/32Q/16D; Singles – Doubles	(Portugal) Gonçalo Oliveira (Australia) Akira Santillan; 2–6, 6–4, [12–10]	(China) Li Zhe (Japan) Go Soeda	(Japan) Yoshihito Nishioka (Japan) Yasutaka Uchiyama	(South Korea) Kwon Soon-woo (Japan) Go Soeda (Japan) Hiroki Moriya (South Korea) Chung Yun-seong
November 19	KPIT MSLTA Challenger; Pune, India; Hard – $50,000+H – 32S/32Q/16D; Singles – Doubles	(Sweden) Elias Ymer; 6–2, 7–5	(India) Prajnesh Gunneswaran	(Moldova) Radu Albot (Canada) Brayden Schnur	(India) Sasikumar Mukund (Kazakhstan) Aleksandr Nedovyesov (Germany) Sebastian Fanselow (Portugal) Frederico Ferreira Silva
November 19	KPIT MSLTA Challenger; Pune, India; Hard – $50,000+H – 32S/32Q/16D; Singles – Doubles	(India) Vijay Sundar Prashanth (India) Ramkumar Ramanathan; 7–6^{(7–3)}, 6–7^{(5–7)}, [10–7]	(Chinese Taipei) Hsieh Cheng-peng (Chinese Taipei) Yang Tsung-hua	(Moldova) Radu Albot (Canada) Brayden Schnur	(India) Sasikumar Mukund (Kazakhstan) Aleksandr Nedovyesov (Germany) Sebastian Fanselow (Portugal) Frederico Ferreira Silva
November 19	Internazionali di Tennis Castel del Monte; Andria, Italy; Hard (i) – €43,000+H – 32S/32Q/16D; Singles – Doubles	(France) Ugo Humbert; 6–4, 7–6^{(7–3)}	(Italy) Filippo Baldi	(Germany) Kevin Krawietz (France) Quentin Halys	(Ukraine) Sergiy Stakhovsky (Italy) Federico Gaio (Italy) Roberto Marcora (Ukraine) Illya Marchenko
November 19	Internazionali di Tennis Castel del Monte; Andria, Italy; Hard (i) – €43,000+H – 32S/32Q/16D; Singles – Doubles	(Poland) Karol Drzewiecki (Poland) Szymon Walków; 7–6^{(12–10)}, 2–6, [11–9]	(Switzerland) Marc-Andrea Hüsler (Netherlands) David Pel	(Germany) Kevin Krawietz (France) Quentin Halys	(Ukraine) Sergiy Stakhovsky (Italy) Federico Gaio (Italy) Roberto Marcora (Ukraine) Illya Marchenko

== Statistical information ==
These tables present the number of singles (S) and doubles (D) titles won by each player and each nation during the season. The players/nations are sorted by: 1) total number of titles (a doubles title won by two players representing the same nation counts as only one win for the nation); 2) a singles > doubles hierarchy; 3) alphabetical order (by family names for players).

=== Titles won by player ===
Total	Player	S	D	S	D
8	Guido Andreozzi (ARG)	● ● ● ●	● ● ● ●	4	4
8	Marcelo Arévalo (ESA)	● ●	● ● ● ● ● ●	2	6
8	Zhang Ze (CHN)	●	● ● ● ● ● ● ●	1	7
7	Sander Gillé (BEL)		● ● ● ● ● ● ●	0	7
7	Gong Maoxin (CHN)		● ● ● ● ● ● ●	0	7
7	Kevin Krawietz (GER)		● ● ● ● ● ● ●	0	7
7	Joran Vliegen (BEL)		● ● ● ● ● ● ●	0	7
6	Gerard Granollers (ESP)		● ● ● ● ● ●	0	6
6	Denys Molchanov (UKR)		● ● ● ● ● ●	0	6
6	Igor Zelenay (SVK)		● ● ● ● ● ●	0	6
5	Marcel Granollers (ESP)	● ●	● ● ●	2	3
5	Luke Bambridge (GBR)		● ● ● ● ●	0	5
5	Guillermo Durán (ARG)		● ● ● ● ●	0	5
5	Hsieh Cheng-peng (TPE)		● ● ● ● ●	0	5
5	Andreas Mies (GER)		● ● ● ● ●	0	5
5	Frederik Nielsen (DEN)		● ● ● ● ●	0	5
4	Hugo Dellien (BOL)	● ● ●	●	3	1
4	Jordan Thompson (AUS)	● ● ●	●	3	1
4	Yannick Hanfmann (GER)	● ●	● ●	2	2
4	Bradley Klahn (USA)	● ●	● ●	2	2
4	Ariel Behar (URU)		● ● ● ●	0	4
4	Robert Galloway (USA)		● ● ● ●	0	4
4	Rameez Junaid (AUS)		● ● ● ●	0	4
4	Austin Krajicek (USA)		● ● ● ●	0	4
4	Roberto Maytín (VEN)		● ● ● ●	0	4
4	Jeevan Nedunchezhiyan (IND)		● ● ● ●	0	4
4	Tim Pütz (GER)		● ● ● ●	0	4
4	Miguel Ángel Reyes-Varela (MEX)		● ● ● ●	0	4
4	Christopher Rungkat (INA)		● ● ● ●	0	4
4	Neal Skupski (GBR)		● ● ● ●	0	4
4	David Vega Hernández (ESP)		● ● ● ●	0	4
3	Pablo Andújar (ESP)	● ● ●		3	0
3	Christian Garín (CHI)	● ● ●		3	0
3	Ugo Humbert (FRA)	● ● ●		3	0
3	Reilly Opelka (USA)	● ● ●		3	0
3	Félix Auger-Aliassime (CAN)	● ●	●	2	1
3	Lloyd Harris (RSA)	● ●	●	2	1
3	Thanasi Kokkinakis (AUS)	● ●	●	2	1
3	Noah Rubin (USA)	● ●	●	2	1
3	Tommy Paul (USA)	●	● ●	1	2
3	Peter Polansky (CAN)	●	● ●	1	2
3	Lukáš Rosol (CZE)	●	● ●	1	2
3	Romain Arneodo (MON)		● ● ●	0	3
3	Fabrício Neis (BRA)		● ● ●	0	3
3	Julian Ocleppo (ITA)		● ● ●	0	3
3	Gonçalo Oliveira (POR)		● ● ●	0	3
3	Jonny O'Mara (GBR)		● ● ●	0	3
3	Ante Pavić (CRO)		● ● ●	0	3
3	Matt Reid (AUS)		● ● ●	0	3
3	Joe Salisbury (GBR)		● ● ●	0	3
3	Luke Saville (AUS)		● ● ●	0	3
3	John-Patrick Smith (AUS)		● ● ●	0	3
3	Andrea Vavassori (ITA)		● ● ●	0	3
3	Szymon Walków (POL)		● ● ●	0	3
3	Tristan-Samuel Weissborn (AUT)		● ● ●	0	3
2	Prajnesh Gunneswaran (IND)	● ●		2	0
2	Quentin Halys (FRA)	● ●		2	0
2	Hubert Hurkacz (POL)	● ●		2	0
2	Denis Istomin (UZB)	● ●		2	0
2	Jason Kubler (AUS)	● ●		2	0
2	Juan Ignacio Londero (ARG)	● ●		2	0
2	Paolo Lorenzi (ITA)	● ●		2	0
2	John Millman (AUS)	● ●		2	0
2	Michael Mmoh (USA)	● ●		2	0
2	Jaume Munar (ESP)	● ●		2	0
2	Vasek Pospisil (CAN)	● ●		2	0
2	Gianluigi Quinzi (ITA)	● ●		2	0
2	Pedro Sousa (POR)	● ●		2	0
2	Yasutaka Uchiyama (JPN)	● ●		2	0
2	Elias Ymer (SWE)	● ●		2	0
2	Facundo Bagnis (ARG)	●	●	1	1
2	Filippo Baldi (ITA)	●	●	1	1
2	Alex Bolt (AUS)	●	●	1	1
2	Matthew Ebden (AUS)	●	●	1	1
2	Denis Kudla (USA)	●	●	1	1
2	Andrej Martin (SVK)	●	●	1	1
2	Pedro Martínez (ESP)	●	●	1	1
2	Mackenzie McDonald (USA)	●	●	1	1
2	Marc Polmans (AUS)	●	●	1	1
2	Sergiy Stakhovsky (UKR)	●	●	1	1
2	Sander Arends (NED)		● ●	0	2
2	Sriram Balaji (IND)		● ●	0	2
2	Tomislav Brkić (BIH)		● ●	0	2
2	Aliaksandr Bury (BLR)		● ●	0	2
2	James Cerretani (USA)		● ●	0	2
2	Karol Drzewiecki (POL)		● ●	0	2
2	Harri Heliövaara (FIN)		● ●	0	2
2	Evan King (USA)		● ●	0	2
2	Wesley Koolhof (NED)		● ●	0	2
2	Mateusz Kowalczyk (POL)		● ●	0	2
2	Henri Laaksonen (SUI)		● ●	0	2
2	Enrique López Pérez (ESP)		● ●	0	2
2	Toshihide Matsui (JPN)		● ●	0	2
2	Hugo Nys (FRA)		● ●	0	2
2	Leander Paes (IND)		● ●	0	2
2	David Pel (NED)		● ●	0	2
2	Andrea Pellegrino (ITA)		● ●	0	2
2	David Pérez Sanz (ESP)		● ●	0	2
2	Philipp Petzschner (GER)		● ●	0	2
2	Purav Raja (IND)		● ●	0	2
2	Hunter Reese (USA)		● ●	0	2
2	Akira Santillan (AUS)		● ●	0	2
2	Vishnu Vardhan (IND)		● ●	0	2
2	Yang Tsung-hua (TPE)		● ●	0	2
1	Radu Albot (MDA)	●		1	0
1	Maverick Banes (AUS)	●		1	0
1	Grégoire Barrère (FRA)	●		1	0
1	Aljaž Bedene (SLO)	●		1	0
1	Ričardas Berankis (LTU)	●		1	0
1	Carlos Berlocq (ARG)	●		1	0
1	Matteo Berrettini (ITA)	●		1	0
1	Yuki Bhambri (IND)	●		1	0
1	Ulises Blanch (USA)	●		1	0
1	Daniel Brands (GER)	●		1	0
1	Alexander Bublik (KAZ)	●		1	0
1	Roberto Carballés Baena (ESP)	●		1	0
1	Salvatore Caruso (ITA)	●		1	0
1	Marco Cecchinato (ITA)	●		1	0
1	Jérémy Chardy (FRA)	●		1	0
1	Jay Clarke (GBR)	●		1	0
1	Kimmer Coppejans (BEL)	●		1	0
1	Enzo Couacaud (FRA)	●		1	0
1	Thiemo de Bakker (NED)	●		1	0
1	Arthur De Greef (BEL)	●		1	0
1	Alex de Minaur (AUS)	●		1	0
1	Federico Delbonis (ARG)	●		1	0
1	Laslo Đere (SRB)	●		1	0
1	Dragoș Dima (ROU)	●		1	0
1	James Duckworth (AUS)	●		1	0
1	Christopher Eubanks (USA)	●		1	0
1	Dan Evans (GBR)	●		1	0
1	Thomas Fabbiano (ITA)	●		1	0
1	David Ferrer (ESP)	●		1	0
1	Bjorn Fratangelo (USA)	●		1	0
1	Taylor Fritz (USA)	●		1	0
1	Daniel Elahi Galán (COL)	●		1	0
1	Egor Gerasimov (BLR)	●		1	0
1	Alessandro Giannessi (ITA)	●		1	0
1	Scott Griekspoor (NED)	●		1	0
1	Tallon Griekspoor (NED)	●		1	0
1	Sergio Gutiérrez Ferrol (ESP)	●		1	0
1	Antoine Hoang (FRA)	●		1	0
1	Filip Horanský (SVK)	●		1	0
1	Tatsuma Ito (JPN)	●		1	0
1	Ilya Ivashka (BLR)	●		1	0
1	Malek Jaziri (TUN)	●		1	0
1	Jason Jung (TPE)	●		1	0
1	Ivo Karlović (CRO)	●		1	0
1	Evgeny Karlovskiy (RUS)	●		1	0
1	Blaž Kavčič (SLO)	●		1	0
1	Miomir Kecmanović (SRB)	●		1	0
1	Martin Kližan (SVK)	●		1	0
1	Jozef Kovalík (SVK)	●		1	0
1	Mikhail Kukushkin (KAZ)	●		1	0
1	Lukáš Lacko (SVK)	●		1	0
1	Dušan Lajović (SRB)	●		1	0
1	Constant Lestienne (FRA)	●		1	0
1	Maximilian Marterer (GER)	●		1	0
1	Adrián Menéndez Maceiras (ESP)	●		1	0
1	Nikola Milojević (SRB)	●		1	0
1	Rudolf Molleker (GER)	●		1	0
1	Gaël Monfils (FRA)	●		1	0
1	Mats Moraing (GER)	●		1	0
1	Hiroki Moriya (JPN)	●		1	0
1	Corentin Moutet (FRA)	●		1	0
1	Kei Nishikori (JPN)	●		1	0
1	Yoshihito Nishioka (JPN)	●		1	0
1	Dennis Novikov (USA)	●		1	0
1	Sebastian Ofner (AUT)	●		1	0
1	Adam Pavlásek (CZE)	●		1	0
1	Guido Pella (ARG)	●		1	0
1	Alexei Popyrin (AUS)	●		1	0
1	Stéphane Robert (FRA)	●		1	0
1	Tommy Robredo (ESP)	●		1	0
1	Jurij Rodionov (AUT)	●		1	0
1	Andreas Seppi (ITA)	●		1	0
1	Lorenzo Sonego (ITA)	●		1	0
1	Bernard Tomic (AUS)	●		1	0
1	Stefano Travaglia (ITA)	●		1	0
1	Marco Trungelliti (ARG)	●		1	0
1	Luca Vanni (ITA)	●		1	0
1	Andrés Artuñedo (ESP)		●	0	1
1	Attila Balázs (HUN)		●	0	1
1	Jeremy Beale (AUS)		●	0	1
1	Andre Begemann (GER)		●	0	1
1	Elliot Benchetrit (FRA)		●	0	1
1	Geoffrey Blancaneaux (FRA)		●	0	1
1	Daniele Bracciali (ITA)		●	0	1
1	Dustin Brown (GER)		●	0	1
1	Scott Clayton (GBR)		●	0	1
1	Joris De Loore (BEL)		●	0	1
1	Marcelo Demoliner (BRA)		●	0	1
1	Matteo Donati (ITA)		●	0	1
1	Marin Draganja (CRO)		●	0	1
1	Tomislav Draganja (CRO)		●	0	1
1	Mikhail Elgin (RUS)		●	0	1
1	Markus Eriksson (SWE)		●	0	1
1	Jonathan Erlich (ISR)		●	0	1
1	Gonzalo Escobar (ECU)		●	0	1
1	Jonathan Eysseric (FRA)		●	0	1
1	Sanjar Fayziev (UZB)		●	0	1
1	Federico Gaio (ITA)		●	0	1
1	Ivan Gakhov (RUS)		●	0	1
1	Lorenzo Giustino (ITA)		●	0	1
1	Ruben Gonzales (PHI)		●	0	1
1	Santiago González (MEX)		●	0	1
1	André Göransson (SWE)		●	0	1
1	Hans Hach Verdugo (MEX)		●	0	1
1	Evan Hoyt (GBR)		●	0	1
1	Marc-Andrea Hüsler (SUI)		●	0	1
1	Tobias Kamke (GER)		●	0	1
1	Jurabek Karimov (UZB)		●	0	1
1	Timur Khabibulin (KAZ)		●	0	1
1	Darian King (BAR)		●	0	1
1	Zdeněk Kolář (CZE)		●	0	1
1	Nicola Kuhn (ESP)		●	0	1
1	Nathaniel Lammons (USA)		●	0	1
1	Alex Lawson (USA)		●	0	1
1	Li Zhe (CHN)		●	0	1
1	Vladyslav Manafov (UKR)		●	0	1
1	Nicholas Monroe (USA)		●	0	1
1	Bradley Mousley (AUS)		●	0	1
1	Nam Ji-sung (KOR)		●	0	1
1	Guillermo Olaso (ESP)		●	0	1
1	Nathan Pasha (USA)		●	0	1
1	Alexander Pavlioutchenkov (RUS)		●	0	1
1	Peng Hsien-yin (TPE)		●	0	1
1	Danilo Petrović (SRB)		●	0	1
1	Alexander Peya (AUT)		●	0	1
1	Hans Podlipnik Castillo (CHI)		●	0	1
1	Filip Polášek (SVK)		●	0	1
1	Vijay Sundar Prashanth (IND)		●	0	1
1	Max Purcell (AUS)		●	0	1
1	Roberto Quiroz (ECU)		●	0	1
1	Ramkumar Ramanathan (IND)		●	0	1
1	Sanchai Ratiwatana (THA)		●	0	1
1	Ruan Roelofse (RSA)		●	0	1
1	Fernando Romboli (BRA)		●	0	1
1	Manuel Sánchez (MEX)		●	0	1
1	Antonio Šančić (CRO)		●	0	1
1	Adil Shamasdin (CAN)		●	0	1
1	Divij Sharan (IND)		●	0	1
1	Yaraslav Shyla (BLR)		●	0	1
1	Artem Sitak (NZL)		●	0	1
1	Ken Skupski (GBR)		●	0	1
1	Song Min-kyu (KOR)		●	0	1
1	Sem Verbeek (NED)		●	0	1
1	Mark Vervoort (NED)		●	0	1
1	Andrew Whittington (AUS)		●	0	1
1	Jackson Withrow (USA)		●	0	1
1	Wu Tung-lin (TPE)		●	0	1

=== Titles won by nation ===
Total	Nation	S	D
35	United States (USA)	17	18
34	Australia (AUS)	17	17
28	Spain (ESP)	13	15
21	Italy (ITA)	14	7
19	Germany (GER)	6	13
18	Argentina (ARG)	11	7
17	France (FRA)	13	4
15	India (IND)	3	12
14	Great Britain (GBR)	2	12
13	Slovakia (SVK)	5	8
11	Netherlands (NED)	3	8
10	Belgium (BEL)	2	8
9	Canada (CAN)	5	4
9	China (CHN)	1	8
9	Ukraine (UKR)	1	8
8	Japan (JPN)	6	2
8	El Salvador (ESA)	2	6
8	Chinese Taipei (TPE)	1	7
7	Mexico (MEX)	0	7
6	Austria (AUT)	2	4
6	Poland (POL)	2	4
6	Croatia (CRO)	1	5
5	Serbia (SRB)	4	1
5	Belarus (BLR)	2	3
5	Portugal (POR)	2	3
5	Brazil (BRA)	0	5
5	Denmark (DEN)	0	5
4	Bolivia (BOL)	3	1
4	Chile (CHI)	3	1
4	Czech Republic (CZE)	2	2
4	South Africa (RSA)	2	2
4	Indonesia (INA)	0	4
4	Uruguay (URU)	0	4
4	Venezuela (VEN)	0	4
3	Kazakhstan (KAZ)	2	1
3	Sweden (SWE)	2	1
3	Uzbekistan (UZB)	2	1
3	Russia (RUS)	1	2
3	Monaco (MON)	0	3
3	Switzerland (SUI)	0	3
2	Slovenia (SLO)	2	0
2	Bosnia and Herzegovina (BIH)	0	2
2	Ecuador (ECU)	0	2
2	Finland (FIN)	0	2
1	Colombia (COL)	1	0
1	Lithuania (LTU)	1	0
1	Moldova (MDA)	1	0
1	Romania (ROU)	1	0
1	Tunisia (TUN)	1	0
1	Barbados (BAR)	0	1
1	Israel (ISR)	0	1
1	Hungary (HUN)	0	1
1	New Zealand (NZL)	0	1
1	Philippines (PHI)	0	1
1	South Korea (KOR)	0	1
1	Thailand (THA)	0	1

== Point distribution ==
Points are awarded as follows:

Tournament Category	Singles										Doubles				
Tournament Category	W	F	SF	QF	R16	R32	Q	Q3	Q2	Q1	W	F	SF	QF	R16
Challenger $150,000+H; Challenger €127,000+H	125	75	45	25	10	0	+5	0	0	0	125	75	45	25	0
Challenger $150,000 or $125,000+H; Challenger €127,000 or €106,000+H	110	65	40	20	9	0	+5	0	0	0	110	65	40	20	0
Challenger $125,000 or $100,000+H; Challenger €106,000 or €85,000+H	100	60	35	18	8	0	+5	0	0	0	100	60	35	18	0
Challenger $100,000 or $75,000+H; Challenger €85,000 or €64,000+H	90	55	33	17	8	0	+5	0	0	0	90	55	33	17	0
Challenger $75,000; Challenger €64,000	80	48	29	15	7	0	+3	0	0	0	80	48	29	15	0
Challenger $50,000+H; Challenger €43,000+H	80	48	29	15	6	0	+3	0	0	0	80	48	29	15	0
