= 2014 Samarkand Challenger – Singles =

Singles
- 2014 Samarkand Challenger

Final
- Champion: (Uzbekistan) Farrukh Dustov
- Runner-up: (Russia) Aslan Karatsev
- Score: 7–6^{(7–4)}, 6–1

Events
Singles	Doubles
← 2013 ·	Samarkand Challenger	· 2015 →

Teymuraz Gabashvili was the defending champion but decided not to participate.

Farrukh Dustov won the title, defeating Aslan Karatsev in the final, 7–6^{(7–4)}, 6–1.

== Seeds ==
1. (Uzbekistan) Denis Istomin (second round)
2. (Bosnia and Herzegovina) Damir Džumhur (second round)
3. (Austria) Gerald Melzer (semifinals)
4. (Uzbekistan) Farrukh Dustov (champion)
5. (Croatia) Toni Androić (second round)
6. (Canada) Filip Peliwo (second round)
7. (Chile) Hans Podlipnik Castillo (first round)
8. (Spain) ~~Gerard Granollers~~ (withdrew/Non-appearance)
9. (Lithuania) Laurynas Grigelis (first round)

== Draw ==
=== Key ===
- Q = Qualifier
- WC = Wild card
- LL = Lucky loser
- Alt = Alternate
- SE = Special exempt
- PR = Protected ranking
- ITF = ITF entry
- JE = Junior exempt
- w/o = Walkover
- r = Retired
- d = Defaulted
- SR = Special ranking

=== Finals ===
Semifinals
LL	(Netherlands) Boy Westerhof	4	1
4	(Uzbekistan) Farrukh Dustov	6	6
3	(Austria) Gerald Melzer	4	4
(Russia) Aslan Karatsev	6	6

Final
4	(Uzbekistan) Farrukh Dustov	7^{7}	6
(Russia) Aslan Karatsev	6^{4}	1

=== Top half ===
First round
1	(Uzbekistan) D Istomin	6	3	6
Q	(Russia) A Zaitsev	3	6	3
LL	(Netherlands) B Westerhof	6	6
WC	(Uzbekistan) S Ikramov	3	4
Q	(Uzbekistan) S Fayziev	1	6^{9}
WC	(Russia) Karen Khachanov	6	7^{11}
WC	(Uzbekistan) T Ismailov	6	5	6^{2}
6	(Canada) F Peliwo	2	7	7^{7}
4	(Uzbekistan) F Dustov	6	3	6
(Slovakia) Adrian Sikora	1	6	1
(Netherlands) A van der Duim	6	6
(Bosnia and Herzegovina) A Šetkić	3	4
(Serbia) P Krstin	4	5
Q	(Ukraine) D Molchanov	6	7
(Russia) V Rudnev	6	7^{9}
9	(Lithuania) L Grigelis	4	6^{7}

Second round
1	(Uzbekistan) D Istomin	6^{4}	6	6^{1}
LL	(Netherlands) B Westerhof	7^{7}	2	7^{7}
WC	(Russia) K Khachanov	6	1	7
6	(Canada) F Peliwo	3	6	5
4	(Uzbekistan) F Dustov	6	6
(Netherlands) A van der Duim	4	4
Q	(Ukraine) D Molchanov	6	3	4
(Russia) V Rudnev	4	6	6

Quarterfinals
LL	(Netherlands) B Westerhof	6	6
WC	(Russia) K Khachanov	1	4
4	(Uzbekistan) F Dustov	6	6
(Russia) V Rudnev	3	2

Semifinals
LL	(Netherlands) B Westerhof	4	1
4	(Uzbekistan) F Dustov	6	6

=== Bottom half ===
First round
5	(Croatia) T Androić	7^{7}	6
(Austria) Marc Rath	6^{2}	0
(India) S Myneni	6	2	0
Q	(Russia) Alexander Lobkov	3	6	6
(India) J Nedunchezhiyan	4	6	6^{2}
(Croatia) B Ćorić	6	3	7^{7}
(Georgia (country)) N Basilashvili	2	4
3	(Austria) G Melzer	6	6
7	(Chile) H Podlipnik-Castillo	3	6^{6}
WC	(Uzbekistan) V Uzakov	6	7^{8}
(Czech Republic) Michal Konečný	6^{2}	6^{2}
LL	(Belarus) A Bury	7^{7}	7^{7}
(India) S Balaji	2	2
(Russia) A Karatsev	6	6
(Ukraine) A Smirnov	6	5	4
2	(Bosnia and Herzegovina) D Džumhur	2	7	6

Second round
5	(Croatia) T Androić	4	3
Q	(Russia) A Lobkov	6	6
(Croatia) B Ćorić	6^{6}	4
3	(Austria) G Melzer	7^{8}	6
WC	(Uzbekistan) V Uzakov	6	1	3
LL	(Belarus) A Bury	4	6	6
(Russia) A Karatsev	6	6
2	(Bosnia and Herzegovina) D Džumhur	3	2

Quarterfinals
(Russia) A Lobkov	2	1
3	(Austria) G Melzer	6	6
LL	(Belarus) A Bury	4	2
(Russia) A Karatsev	6	6

Semifinals
3	(Austria) G Melzer	4	4
(Russia) A Karatsev	6	6
