= 2011 Samarkand Challenger – Doubles =

Doubles
- 2011 Samarkand Challenger

Final
- Champions: (Russia) Michail Elgin (Russia) Alexandre Kudryavtsev
- Runners-up: (Moldova) Radu Albot (Russia) Andrey Kuznetsov
- Score: 7–6^{(7–4)}, 2–6, [10–7]

Events
Singles	Doubles
← 2010 ·	Samarkand Challenger	· 2012 →

Andis Juška and Deniss Pavlovs were the defending champions; however, they both chose not to participate this year.

Michail Elgin and Alexandre Kudryavtsev won this tournament. They defeated Radu Albot and Andrey Kuznetsov 7–6^{(7–4)}, 2–6, [10–7] in the final.

== Seeds ==
1. (Russia) Michail Elgin / (Russia) Alexandre Kudryavtsev (champions)
2. (Tunisia) Malek Jaziri / (Spain) Adrián Menéndez (quarterfinals)
3. (India) Divij Sharan / (India) Vishnu Vardhan (semifinals)
4. (Austria) Gerald Melzer / (Russia) Mikhail Vasiliev (semifinals)

== Draw ==
=== Key ===
- Q = Qualifier
- WC = Wild card
- LL = Lucky loser
- Alt = Alternate
- SE = Special exempt
- PR = Protected ranking
- ITF = ITF entry
- JE = Junior exempt
- w/o = Walkover
- r = Retired
- d = Defaulted
- SR = Special ranking

=== Draw ===
First round
1	(Russia) M Elgin (Russia) A Kudryavtsev	6	7^{7}
(Slovakia) A Martin (Slovakia) M Mečíř Jr.	1	6^{4}
WC	(Uzbekistan) Jakhongir Khaydarov (Uzbekistan) Abduvoris Saidmukhamedov	7^{9}	6
(Serbia) D Lajović (Serbia) M Zekić	6^{7}	1
3	(India) D Sharan (India) V Vardhan	6	6
(Slovakia) I Klec (Slovakia) M Semjan	1	4
(Uzbekistan) S Ikramov (Uzbekistan) Nigmat Shofayziev	6	6^{5}	[11]
(Russia) Illia Chkonia (Uzbekistan) Jakhongir Jalalov	1	7^{7}	[13]
WC	(Uzbekistan) Sanjar Fayziev (Uzbekistan) Temur Ismailov	1	1
(Uzbekistan) D Istomin (Georgia (country)) I Labadze	6	6
(Uzbekistan) M Inoyatov (Indonesia) C Rungkat	6^{6}	3
4	(Austria) G Melzer (Russia) Mikhail Vasiliev	7^{8}	6
(France) J Dasnières de Veigy (France) L Recouderc	3	2
(Moldova) R Albot (Russia) A Kuznetsov	6	6
WC	(Uzbekistan) Sergey Shipilov (Uzbekistan) V Uzakov	1	3
2	(Tunisia) M Jaziri (Spain) A Menéndez	6	6

Quarterfinals
1	(Russia) M Elgin (Russia) A Kudryavtsev	6	6
WC	(Uzbekistan) Jakhongir Khaydarov (Uzbekistan) Abduvoris Saidmukhamedov	1	1
3	(India) D Sharan (India) V Vardhan	6	6
(Russia) Illia Chkonia (Uzbekistan) Jakhongir Jalalov	0	4
(Uzbekistan) D Istomin (Georgia (country)) I Labadze	7	4	[7]
4	(Austria) G Melzer (Russia) Mikhail Vasiliev	5	6	[10]
(Moldova) R Albot (Russia) A Kuznetsov	7^{7}	6^{5}	[10]
2	(Tunisia) M Jaziri (Spain) A Menéndez	6^{2}	7^{7}	[7]

Semifinals
1	(Russia) M Elgin (Russia) A Kudryavtsev	7^{7}	6
3	(India) D Sharan (India) V Vardhan	6^{4}	3
4	(Austria) G Melzer (Russia) Mikhail Vasiliev	6^{3}	6^{4}
(Moldova) R Albot (Russia) A Kuznetsov	7^{7}	7^{7}

Final
1	(Russia) M Elgin (Russia) A Kudryavtsev	7^{7}	2	[10]
(Moldova) R Albot (Russia) A Kuznetsov	6^{4}	6	[7]
