= 2011 Samarkand Challenger – Singles =

Singles
- 2011 Samarkand Challenger

Final
- Champion: (Uzbekistan) Denis Istomin
- Runner-up: (Tunisia) Malek Jaziri
- Score: 7–6^{(7–2)}, ret.

Events
| Singles | Doubles |
| ← 2010 · | Samarkand Challenger | · 2012 → |

Andrej Martin was the defending champion, but Radu Albot defeated and eliminated him already in the first round.
Denis Istomin won the title, defeating Malek Jaziri, who retired after Istomin won the first set by a score of 7–6^{(7–2)}.

== Seeds ==
1. (Uzbekistan) Denis Istomin (champion)
2. (Russia) Alexander Kudryavtsev (first round)
3. (Netherlands) Igor Sijsling (second round)
4. (Romania) Victor Crivoi (quarterfinals)
5. (Slovakia) Andrej Martin (first round)
6. (Tunisia) Malek Jaziri (final, retired due to right ankle injury)
7. (France) Jonathan Dasnières de Veigy (second round)
8. (Slovakia) Ivo Klec (second round)

== Draw ==
=== Key ===
- Q = Qualifier
- WC = Wild card
- LL = Lucky loser
- Alt = Alternate
- SE = Special exempt
- PR = Protected ranking
- ITF = ITF entry
- JE = Junior exempt
- w/o = Walkover
- r = Retired
- d = Defaulted
- SR = Special ranking

=== Finals ===
Semifinals
1/WC | (Uzbekistan) Denis Istomin | 7 | 7
(Austria) Gerald Melzer | 5 | 5
(Slovakia) Miloslav Mečíř Jr. | 6^{4} | 3
6 | (Tunisia) Malek Jaziri | 7^{7} | 6

Final
1/WC | (Uzbekistan) Denis Istomin | 7^{7} | 0
6 | (Tunisia) Malek Jaziri | 6^{2} | 0^{r}

=== Top half ===
First round
1/WC | (Uzbekistan) D Istomin | 6 | 6
(Russia) M Elgin | 3 | 4
(India) V Vardhan | 4 | 7^{7} | 3
(Russia) M Ledovskikh | 6 | 6^{5} | 6
WC | (Indonesia) C Rungkat | 6 | 6
LL | (Uzbekistan) Jakhongir Jalalov | 1 | 0
(Moldova) R Albot | 3 | 6 | 6
5 | (Slovakia) A Martin | 6 | 1 | 3
3 | (Netherlands) I Sijsling | 6 | 6
(Japan) Junn Mitsuhashi | 2 | 2
LL | (Uzbekistan) V Uzakov | 2 | 4
(Austria) G Melzer | 6 | 6
WC | (Uzbekistan) M Inoyatov | 6^{1} | 5
(Chinese Taipei) T-h Yang | 7^{7} | 7
Q | (India) D Sharan | 7^{7} | 2 | 4
8 | (Slovakia) I Klec | 6^{5} | 6 | 6

Second round
1/WC | (Uzbekistan) D Istomin | 7^{7} | 6
(Russia) M Ledovskikh | 6^{3} | 2
WC | (Indonesia) C Rungkat | 4 | 3
(Moldova) R Albot | 6 | 6
3 | (Netherlands) I Sijsling | 2 | 3
(Austria) G Melzer | 6 | 6
(Chinese Taipei) T-h Yang | 1 | 6 | 6
8 | (Slovakia) I Klec | 6 | 4 | 3

Quarterfinals
1/WC | (Uzbekistan) D Istomin | 6 | 7
(Moldova) R Albot | 3 | 5
(Austria) G Melzer | 4 | 6 | 6
(Chinese Taipei) T-h Yang | 6 | 3 | 4

Semifinals
1/WC | (Uzbekistan) D Istomin | 7 | 7
(Austria) G Melzer | 5 | 5

=== Bottom half ===
First round
7 | (France) J Dasnières de Veigy | 7^{7} | 4 | 6
(Serbia) D Lajović | 6^{3} | 6 | 3
(Slovakia) M Mečíř Jr. | 7 | 6
(Russia) Mikhail Vasiliev | 5 | 3
(Russia) A Kuznetsov | 6^{5} | 6 | 6
(Slovakia) M Semjan | 7^{7} | 4 | 1
Q | (Uzbekistan) Temur Ismailov | 4 | 0
4 | (Romania) V Crivoi | 6 | 6
6 | (Tunisia) M Jaziri | 6 | 7^{7}
(France) L Recouderc | 3 | 6^{4}
WC | (Uzbekistan) Nigmat Shofayziev | 6 | 7^{7}
Q | (Uzbekistan) S Ikramov | 4 | 6^{4}
(Spain) A Menéndez | 5 | 4
(Uzbekistan) F Dustov | 7 | 6
(Serbia) M Zekić | 6 | 6
2/Q | (Russia) A Kudryavtsev | 4 | 4

Second round
7 | (France) J Dasnières de Veigy | 7^{8} | 0 | 6^{3}
(Slovakia) M Mečíř Jr. | 6^{6} | 6 | 7^{7}
(Russia) A Kuznetsov | 6 | 4 | 4
4 | (Romania) V Crivoi | 2 | 6 | 6
6 | (Tunisia) M Jaziri | 6 | 6
WC | (Uzbekistan) Nigmat Shofayziev | 1 | 2
(Uzbekistan) F Dustov | 4 | 7^{7} | 6^{5}
(Serbia) M Zekić | 6 | 6^{5} | 7^{7}

Quarterfinals
(Slovakia) M Mečíř Jr. | 7^{9} | 6
4 | (Romania) V Crivoi | 6^{7} | 4
6 | (Tunisia) M Jaziri | 7 | 6
(Serbia) M Zekić | 5 | 0

Semifinals
(Slovakia) M Mečíř Jr. | 3 | 6^{4}
6 | (Tunisia) M Jaziri | 6 | 7^{7}
