= 2015 Samarkand Challenger – Doubles =

Doubles
- 2015 Samarkand Challenger

Final
- Champions: (Belarus) Sergey Betov (Russia) Michail Elgin
- Runners-up: (Serbia) Laslo Djere (Serbia) Peđa Krstin
- Score: 6–4, 6–3

Events
Singles	Doubles
← 2014 ·	Samarkand Challenger	· 2016 →

Sergey Betov and Alexander Bury were the defending champions, but chose not to participate together. Bury played alongside Anton Zaitcev, but lost to Aldin Šetkić and Boy Westerhof in the quarterfinals.

Betov competed with Michail Elgin and retain the title, defeating Laslo Djere and Peđa Krstin in the final, 6–4, 6–3.

== Seeds ==
1. (India) Saketh Myneni / (India) Divij Sharan (quarterfinals)
2. (Belarus) Sergey Betov / (Russia) Michail Elgin (champions)
3. (Belarus) Alexander Bury / (Russia) Anton Zaitcev (quarterfinals)
4. (Belarus) Yaraslau Shyla / (Belarus) Andrei Vasilevski (quarterfinals)

== Draw ==
=== Key ===
- Q = Qualifier
- WC = Wild card
- LL = Lucky loser
- Alt = Alternate
- SE = Special exempt
- PR = Protected ranking
- ITF = ITF entry
- JE = Junior exempt
- w/o = Walkover
- r = Retired
- d = Defaulted
- SR = Special ranking

First round
1	(India) S Myneni (India) D Sharan	6	3	[10]
(Estonia) V Ivanov (Belarus) D Zhyrmont	3	6	[8]
(Serbia) L Đere (Serbia) P Krstin	6	6
WC	(Uzbekistan) Batyr Sapaev (Uzbekistan) K Sultanov	3	1
3	(Belarus) A Bury (Russia) A Zaitcev	6	6
WC	(Uzbekistan) T Ismailov (Uzbekistan) Shonigmatjon Shofayziyev	4	4
(Bosnia and Herzegovina) A Šetkić (Netherlands) B Westerhof	6	4	[10]
(Lithuania) L Grigelis (Slovakia) Adrian Sikora	2	6	[7]
(Italy) R Ghedin (Russia) D Matsukevitch	7	6
WC	(Uzbekistan) S Fayziev (Uzbekistan) J Karimov	5	3
(Brazil) G Clezar (Uzbekistan) F Dustov	2	5
4	(Belarus) Y Shyla (Belarus) A Vasilevski	6	7
(Russia) I Gakhov (Russia) A Karatsev	3	4
(Australia) M Ebden (United Kingdom) B Klein	6	6
(United Kingdom) L Bambridge (United Kingdom) L Broady	5	6	[7]
2	(Belarus) S Betov (Russia) M Elgin	7	3	[10]

Quarterfinals
1	(India) S Myneni (India) D Sharan	4	6^{4}
(Serbia) L Đere (Serbia) P Krstin	6	7^{7}
3	(Belarus) A Bury (Russia) A Zaitcev	6	5	[5]
(Bosnia and Herzegovina) A Šetkić (Netherlands) B Westerhof	3	7	[10]
(Italy) R Ghedin (Russia) D Matsukevitch	4	6	[11]
4	(Belarus) Y Shyla (Belarus) A Vasilevski	6	3	[9]
(Australia) M Ebden (United Kingdom) B Klein	7	2	[8]
2	(Belarus) S Betov (Russia) M Elgin	5	6	[10]

Semifinals
(Serbia) L Đere (Serbia) P Krstin	2	7	[10]
(Bosnia and Herzegovina) A Šetkić (Netherlands) B Westerhof	6	5	[8]
(Italy) R Ghedin (Russia) D Matsukevitch	4	4
2	(Belarus) S Betov (Russia) M Elgin	6	6

Final
(Serbia) L Đere (Serbia) P Krstin	4	3
2	(Belarus) S Betov (Russia) M Elgin	6	6
