= 2018 Samarkand Challenger – Singles =

Samarkand Challenger

Singles
- 2018 Samarkand Challenger

Final
- Champion: (Italy) Luca Vanni
- Runner-up: (Spain) Mario Vilella Martínez
- Score: 6–4, 6–4

Events
| Singles | Doubles |
| ← 2017 · | Samarkand Challenger | · 2019 → |

Adrián Menéndez Maceiras was the defending champion but chose not to defend his title.

Luca Vanni won the title after defeating Mario Vilella Martínez 6–4, 6–4 in the final.

== Seeds ==
1. (Uzbekistan) Denis Istomin (first round)
2. (Hungary) Attila Balázs (quarterfinals)
3. (Serbia) Nikola Milojević (semifinals)
4. (Belarus) Uladzimir Ignatik (semifinals)
5. (South Africa) Lloyd Harris (quarterfinals)
6. (Kazakhstan) Aleksandr Nedovyesov (first round)
7. (Belarus) Egor Gerasimov (first round)
8. (Chinese Taipei) Yang Tsung-hua (quarterfinals)

== Draw ==
=== Key ===
- Q = Qualifier
- WC = Wild card
- LL = Lucky loser
- Alt = Alternate
- SE = Special exempt
- PR = Protected ranking
- ITF = ITF entry
- JE = Junior exempt
- w/o = Walkover
- r = Retired
- d = Defaulted
- SR = Special ranking

=== Finals ===
Semifinals
(Italy) Luca Vanni | 6 | 6
4 | (Belarus) Uladzimir Ignatik | 3 | 3
3 | (Serbia) Nikola Milojević | 2 | 4
(Spain) Mario Vilella Martínez | 6 | 6

Final
(Italy) Luca Vanni | 6 | 6
(Spain) Mario Vilella Martínez | 4 | 4

=== Top half ===
First round
1/WC | (Uzbekistan) D Istomin | 6^{3} | 4
(Argentina) P Cachin | 7^{7} | 6
(Italy) L Vanni | 6 | 6
(Spain) Carlos Boluda-Purkiss | 0 | 1
(Bosnia and Herzegovina) A Šetkić | 7^{7} | 6^{1} | 6
WC | (Uzbekistan) S Fayziev | 6^{4} | 7^{7} | 3
WC | (Uzbekistan) F Dustov | 1 | 3
8 | (Chinese Taipei) T-h Yang | 6 | 6
4 | (Belarus) U Ignatik | 6 | 6
(Spain) R Ortega Olmedo | 2 | 4
Q | (Argentina) M Peña López | 6 | 6
SE | (Belarus) S Betov | 1 | 1
(Spain) D Muñoz de la Nava | 6 | 6
(Italy) A Basso | 2 | 1
WC | (Uzbekistan) J Karimov | 3 | 3
5 | (South Africa) L Harris | 6 | 6

Second round
(Argentina) P Cachin | 6 | 4 | 6^{4}
(Italy) L Vanni | 4 | 6 | 7^{7}
(Bosnia and Herzegovina) A Šetkić | 2 | 3
8 | (Chinese Taipei) T-h Yang | 6 | 6
4 | (Belarus) U Ignatik | 6 | 6^{5} | 6
Q | (Argentina) M Peña López | 4 | 7^{7} | 1
(Spain) D Muñoz de la Nava | 7^{7} | 5 | 6^{3}
5 | (South Africa) L Harris | 6^{4} | 7 | 7^{7}

Quarterfinals
(Italy) L Vanni | 6 | 6
8 | (Chinese Taipei) T-h Yang | 2 | 4
4 | (Belarus) U Ignatik | 6 | 6
5 | (South Africa) L Harris | 3 | 3

Semifinals
(Italy) L Vanni | 6 | 6
4 | (Belarus) U Ignatik | 3 | 3

=== Bottom half ===
First round
6 | (Kazakhstan) A Nedovyesov | 4 | 4
(Serbia) M Zekić | 6 | 6
Q | (Russia) R Safiullin | 7^{7} | 6
(Russia) T Gabashvili | 6^{4} | 4
(Russia) I Gakhov | 7 | 7^{7}
(Argentina) Patricio Heras | 5 | 6^{5}
Q | (Uzbekistan) S Fomin | 0 | 0
3 | (Serbia) N Milojević | 6 | 6
7 | (Belarus) E Gerasimov | 7 | 6^{8} | 4
(Spain) M Vilella Martínez | 5 | 7^{10} | 6
(United States) JC Aragone | 7^{9} | 7^{7}
(Russia) E Karlovskiy | 6^{7} | 6^{5}
(Slovakia) F Horanský | 6 | 4 | 4
Q | (India) S Balaji | 0 | 6 | 6
(Colombia) C Rodríguez | 4 | 2
2 | (Hungary) A Balázs | 6 | 6

Second round
(Serbia) M Zekić | 6 | 6
Q | (Russia) R Safiullin | 1 | 4
(Russia) I Gakhov | 3 | 4
3 | (Serbia) N Milojević | 6 | 6
(Spain) M Vilella Martínez | 6 | 5 | 6
(United States) JC Aragone | 4 | 7 | 0
Q | (India) S Balaji | 6^{5} | 6^{3}
2 | (Hungary) A Balázs | 7^{7} | 7^{7}

Quarterfinals
(Serbia) M Zekić | 2 | 1
3 | (Serbia) N Milojević | 6 | 6
(Spain) M Vilella Martínez | 5 | 6 | 6
2 | (Hungary) A Balázs | 7 | 4 | 4

Semifinals
3 | (Serbia) N Milojević | 2 | 4
(Spain) M Vilella Martínez | 6 | 6
