= 2010 Samarkand Challenger – Doubles =

Doubles
- 2010 Samarkand Challenger

Final
- Champions: (Latvia) Andis Juška (Latvia) Deniss Pavlovs
- Runners-up: (Chinese Taipei) Lee Hsin-han (Chinese Taipei) Yang Tsung-hua
- Score: 7–5, 6–3

Events
Singles	Doubles
← 2009 ·	Samarkand Challenger	· 2011 →

Kaden Hensel and Adam Hubble were the defending champions, but they decided to not participate this year.
Andis Juška and Deniss Pavlovs won the final against Lee Hsin-han and Yang Tsung-hua 7–5, 6–3.

== Seeds ==
1. (Russia) Michail Elgin / (Russia) Evgeny Kirillov (semifinals)
2. (Ukraine) Denys Molchanov / (Ukraine) Artem Smirnov (first round)
3. (Latvia) Andis Juška / (Latvia) Deniss Pavlovs (champions)
4. (Chinese Taipei) Lee Hsin-han / (Chinese Taipei) Yang Tsung-hua (final)

== Draw ==
=== Key ===
- Q = Qualifier
- WC = Wild card
- LL = Lucky loser
- Alt = Alternate
- SE = Special exempt
- PR = Protected ranking
- ITF = ITF entry
- JE = Junior exempt
- w/o = Walkover
- r = Retired
- d = Defaulted
- SR = Special ranking

=== Draw ===
First round
1	(Russia) M Elgin (Russia) E Kirillov	6	6
(Romania) T-D Crăciun (Uzbekistan) V Uzakov	4	4
(Slovenia) B Kavčič (Serbia) B Pašanski	3	7	[10]
(New Zealand) J Statham (New Zealand) M Venus	6	6^{8}	[5]
4	(Chinese Taipei) H-h Lee (Chinese Taipei) T-h Yang	6	6
(Uzbekistan) M Inoyatov (Russia) A Kumantsov	3	0
WC	(Uzbekistan) B Kamiljanov (Uzbekistan) N Shofayziev	2	2
(Germany) A Flock (Spain) C Poch-Gradin	6	6
(Czech Republic) J Minář (Slovakia) M Semjan	7	3	[10]
(Brazil) T Fernandes (Kazakhstan) A Kedryuk	6^{4}	6	[6]
WC	(Uzbekistan) S Shipilov (Uzbekistan) A Tarasov	1	2
3	(Latvia) A Juška (Latvia) D Pavlovs	6	6
WC	(Uzbekistan) S Ikramov (Uzbekistan) T Ismailov	3	2
(Lithuania) L Grigelis (Argentina) J-M Valverde	6	6
(Slovakia) A Martin (Estonia) J Zopp	3	6	[10]
2	(Ukraine) D Molchanov (Ukraine) A Smirnov	6	3	[8]

Quarterfinals
1	(Russia) M Elgin (Russia) E Kirillov	7	7
(Slovenia) B Kavčič (Serbia) B Pašanski	5	6^{5}
4	(Chinese Taipei) H-h Lee (Chinese Taipei) T-h Yang	6	6
(Germany) A Flock (Spain) C Poch-Gradin	3	4
(Czech Republic) J Minář (Slovakia) M Semjan	4	6	[6]
3	(Latvia) A Juška (Latvia) D Pavlovs	6	3	[10]
(Lithuania) L Grigelis (Argentina) J-M Valverde	2	3
(Slovakia) A Martin (Estonia) J Zopp	6	6

Semifinals
1	(Russia) M Elgin (Russia) E Kirillov	7	4	[4]
4	(Chinese Taipei) H-h Lee (Chinese Taipei) T-h Yang	6^{4}	6	[10]
3	(Latvia) A Juška (Latvia) D Pavlovs	6	7
(Slovakia) A Martin (Estonia) J Zopp	3	5

Finals
4	(Chinese Taipei) H-h Lee (Chinese Taipei) T-h Yang	5	3
3	(Latvia) A Juška (Latvia) D Pavlovs	7	6
