= 2015 Samarkand Challenger – Singles =

Singles
- 2015 Samarkand Challenger

Final
- Champion: (Russia) Teymuraz Gabashvili
- Runner-up: (India) Yuki Bhambri
- Score: 6–3, 6–1

Events
Singles	Doubles
← 2014 ·	Samarkand Challenger	· 2016 →

Farrukh Dustov who was second seed at the tournament was the defending champion, but lost in the first round to Luke Bambridge.

Teymuraz Gabashvili won the tournament defeating Yuki Bhambri in the final, 6–3, 6–1.

== Seeds ==
1. (Russia) Teymuraz Gabashvili (champion)
2. (Uzbekistan) Farrukh Dustov (first round)
3. (Spain) Adrián Menéndez Maceiras (quarterfinals)
4. (Russia) Aslan Karatsev (second round)
5. (Brazil) Guilherme Clezar (second round)
6. (United Kingdom) Liam Broady (quarterfinals)
7. (India) Yuki Bhambri (final)
8. (United Kingdom) Brydan Klein (quarterfinals)

== Draw ==
=== Key ===
- Q = Qualifier
- WC = Wild card
- LL = Lucky loser
- Alt = Alternate
- SE = Special exempt
- PR = Protected ranking
- ITF = ITF entry
- JE = Junior exempt
- w/o = Walkover
- r = Retired
- d = Defaulted
- SR = Special ranking

=== Finals ===
Semifinals
1	(Russia) Teymuraz Gabashvili	6	6^{4}	6
(Australia) Matthew Ebden	3	7^{7}	4
7	(India) Yuki Bhambri	6	7
(India) Saketh Myneni	4	5

Final
1	(Russia) Teymuraz Gabashvili	6	6
7	(India) Yuki Bhambri	3	1

=== Top half ===
First round
1	(Russia) T Gabashvili	6	6
(Belarus) Y Shyla	0	2
(Lithuania) L Grigelis	6	6
(Belarus) D Zhyrmont	4	2
WC	(Uzbekistan) J Karimov	4	6	7^{8}
Q	(India) D Sharan	6	4	6^{6}
(Slovakia) Adrian Sikora	6^{9}	2
6	(United Kingdom) L Broady	7^{11}	6
4	(Russia) A Karatsev	6	6
LL	(Italy) R Ghedin	3	1
WC	(Uzbekistan) Shonigmatjon Shofayziyev	4	4
(Netherlands) B Westerhof	6	6
(Australia) M Ebden	6	5	7^{7}
(Russia) A Zaitcev	1	7	6^{4}
(Austria) D Novak	3	6	4
5	(Brazil) G Clezar	6	1	6

Second round
1	(Russia) T Gabashvili	7	6
(Lithuania) L Grigelis	5	3
WC	(Uzbekistan) J Karimov	3	6	2
6	(United Kingdom) L Broady	6	4	6
4	(Russia) A Karatsev	6^{4}	7^{7}	4
(Netherlands) B Westerhof	7^{7}	6^{4}	6
(Australia) M Ebden	7^{7}	6
5	(Brazil) G Clezar	6^{5}	4

Quarterfinals
1	(Russia) T Gabashvili	6	7^{7}
6	(United Kingdom) L Broady	4	6^{4}
(Netherlands) B Westerhof	2	6^{1}
(Australia) M Ebden	6	7^{7}

Semifinals
1	(Russia) T Gabashvili	6	6^{4}	6
(Australia) M Ebden	3	7^{7}	4

=== Bottom half ===
First round
7	(India) Y Bhambri	6	6
Q	(Russia) I Gakhov	4	3
(Bosnia and Herzegovina) A Šetkić	6	3	4
(Serbia) L Djere	3	6	6
(Serbia) P Krstin	6	6
WC	(Uzbekistan) T Ismailov	3	3
Q	(Russia) M Elgin	0	6	4
3	(Spain) A Menéndez Maceiras	6	4	6
8	(United Kingdom) B Klein	5	6	6
WC	(Uzbekistan) S Fayziev	7	2	1
(Switzerland) A Bossel	4	7^{7}	6^{2}
(Serbia) N Milojević	6	6^{1}	7^{7}
(Estonia) V Ivanov	3	7^{10}	3
(India) S Myneni	6	6^{8}	6
Q	(United Kingdom) L Bambridge	2	6	6
2	(Uzbekistan) F Dustov	6	3	2

Second round
7	(India) Y Bhambri	1	7	7^{7}
(Serbia) L Djere	6	5	6^{1}
(Serbia) P Krstin	6	2	5
3	(Spain) A Menéndez Maceiras	2	6	7
8	(United Kingdom) B Klein	6	1	6
(Serbia) N Milojević	4	6	4
(India) S Myneni	6	6
Q	(United Kingdom) L Bambridge	3	2

Quarterfinals
7	(India) Y Bhambri	6	6
3	(Spain) A Menéndez Maceiras	4	4
8	(United Kingdom) B Klein	4	6	1
(India) S Myneni	6	1	6

Semifinals
7	(India) Y Bhambri	6	7
(India) S Myneni	4	5
