= 2013 Samarkand Challenger – Doubles =

Doubles
- 2013 Samarkand Challenger

Final
- Champions: (Uzbekistan) Farrukh Dustov (Ukraine) Oleksandr Nedovyesov
- Runners-up: (Moldova) Radu Albot (Australia) Jordan Kerr
- Score: 6–1, 7–6^{(9–7)}

Events
Singles	Doubles
- Samarkand Challenger

Oleksandr Nedovyesov and Ivan Sergeyev were the defending champions, but Sergeyev decided not to participate. Nedovyesov played alongside Farrukh Dustov and won the title by defeating Radu Albot and Jordan Kerr 6–1, 7–6^{(9–7)} in the final.

== Seeds ==
1. (United States) James Cerretani / (Canada) Adil Shamasdin (semifinals)
2. (Moldova) Radu Albot / (Australia) Jordan Kerr (final)
3. (Russia) Teymuraz Gabashvili / (Ukraine) Denys Molchanov (first round)
4. (Croatia) Toni Androić / (Croatia) Dino Marcan (first round)

== Draw ==
Key

- Q = Qualifier
- WC = Wild card
- LL = Lucky loser
- Alt = Alternate
- ITF = ITF entry
- PR = Protected ranking
- SR = Special ranking
- SE = Special exempt
- JE = Junior exempt
- JR = Junior Accelerator Programme entrant
- CO = College Accelerator Programme entrant
- NG = Next Gen Accelerator Program entrant
- w/o = Walkover
- r = Retired
- d = Defaulted

=== Draw ===
First round
1	(United States) J Cerretani (Canada) A Shamasdin	6	6
WC	(Uzbekistan) S Fayziev (Uzbekistan) Shonigmatjon Shofayziyev	1	3
(Czech Republic) J Mertl (Slovakia) Adrian Sikora	6	2	[10]
(Belarus) S Betov (Spain) Marc Giner	2	6	[8]
4	(Croatia) T Androić (Croatia) D Marcan	2	3
(Uzbekistan) F Dustov (Ukraine) O Nedovyesov	6	6
WC	(Uzbekistan) S Ikramov (Uzbekistan) V Uzakov	7^{7}	6^{2}	[10]
(United States) Adham El-Effendi (United Kingdom) D Walsh	6^{4}	7^{7}	[7]
(Portugal) F Gil (Spain) J Martí	5	4
PR	(Spain) G Olaso (Spain) P Riba	7	6
(Russia) M Elgin (Russia) A Kudryavtsev	6	6^{1}	[10]
3	(Russia) T Gabashvili (Ukraine) D Molchanov	2	7^{7}	[3]
WC	(Uzbekistan) T Ismailov (Uzbekistan) Sergey Shipilov	3	6	[5]
(Chinese Taipei) T Chen (India) V Vardhan	6	1	[10]
(Russia) Alexander Lobkov (Russia) D Matsukevich	2	1
2	(Moldova) R Albot (Australia) J Kerr	6	6

Quarterfinals
1	(United States) J Cerretani (Canada) A Shamasdin	6	6
(Czech Republic) J Mertl (Slovakia) A Sikora	1	3
(Uzbekistan) F Dustov (Ukraine) O Nedovyesov	6	6
WC	(Uzbekistan) S Ikramov (Uzbekistan) V Uzakov	0	2
PR	(Spain) G Olaso (Spain) P Riba	1	6	[3]
(Russia) M Elgin (Russia) A Kudryavtsev	6	2	[10]
(Chinese Taipei) T Chen (India) V Vardhan	6	1	[4]
2	(Moldova) R Albot (Australia) J Kerr	4	6	[10]

Semifinals
1	(United States) J Cerretani (Canada) A Shamasdin	2	7	[2]
(Uzbekistan) F Dustov (Ukraine) O Nedovyesov	6	5	[10]
(Russia) M Elgin (Russia) A Kudryavtsev	4	3
2	(Moldova) R Albot (Australia) J Kerr	6	6

Final
(Uzbekistan) F Dustov (Ukraine) O Nedovyesov	6	7^{9}
2	(Moldova) R Albot (Australia) J Kerr	1	6^{7}
