= 2017 Samarkand Challenger – Doubles =

Doubles
- 2017 Samarkand Challenger

Final
- Champions: (Lithuania) Laurynas Grigelis (Czech Republic) Zdeněk Kolář
- Runners-up: (India) Prajnesh Gunneswaran (India) Vishnu Vardhan
- Score: 7–6^{(7–2)}, 6–3

Events
Singles	Doubles
← 2016 ·	Samarkand Challenger	· 2018 →

Denis Matsukevich and Andrei Vasilevski were the defending champions but chose to defend their title with different partners. Matsukevich partnered Riccardo Ghedin but lost in the quarterfinals to Laurynas Grigelis and Zdeněk Kolář. Vasilevski partnered Hans Podlipnik-Castillo but lost in the semifinals to Prajnesh Gunneswaran and Vishnu Vardhan.

Grigelis and Kolář won the title after defeating Gunneswaran and Vardhan 7–6^{(7–2)}, 6–3 in the final.

== Seeds ==
1. (Chile) Hans Podlipnik-Castillo / (Belarus) Andrei Vasilevski (semifinals)
2. (Russia) Mikhail Elgin / (Russia) Alexander Kudryavtsev (first round)
3. (Germany) Kevin Krawietz / (Spain) Adrián Menéndez-Maceiras (first round)
4. (Italy) Riccardo Ghedin / (Russia) Denis Matsukevich (quarterfinals)

== Draw ==
=== Key ===
- Q = Qualifier
- WC = Wild card
- LL = Lucky loser
- Alt = Alternate
- SE = Special exempt
- PR = Protected ranking
- ITF = ITF entry
- JE = Junior exempt
- w/o = Walkover
- r = Retired
- d = Defaulted
- SR = Special ranking

First round
1	(Chile) H Podlipnik-Castillo (Belarus) A Vasilevski	6	7^{10}
(Russia) T Gabashvili (Belarus) I Ivashka	3	6^{8}
WC	(Estonia) V Ivanov (Estonia) K Raisma	7^{7}	6^{3}	[13]
(Belarus) S Betov (Belarus) Y Shyla	6^{5}	7^{7}	[15]
3	(Germany) K Krawietz (Spain) A Menéndez-Maceiras	3	7^{7}	[7]
(Ukraine) D Molchanov (Ukraine) S Stakhovsky	6	6^{5}	[10]
(India) P Gunneswaran (India) V Vardhan	3
(Belgium) J De Loore (Bosnia and Herzegovina) A Šetkić	1^{r}
WC	(Kazakhstan) R Khassanov (Uzbekistan) Shonigmatjon Shofayziyev	3	4
(Lithuania) L Grigelis (Czech Republic) Z Kolář	6	6
(Kazakhstan) D Popko (Chinese Taipei) T-h Yang	1	5
4	(Italy) R Ghedin (Russia) D Matsukevich	6	7
(Japan) T Matsui (India) R Ramanathan	7^{7}	4	[10]
Alt	(Ukraine) V Manafov (Kazakhstan) A Nedovyesov	6^{3}	6	[5]
WC	(Uzbekistan) F Dustov (Uzbekistan) S Fayziev	6	6^{5}	[10]
2	(Russia) M Elgin (Russia) A Kudryavtsev	2	7^{7}	[6]

Quarterfinals
1	(Chile) H Podlipnik-Castillo (Belarus) A Vasilevski	6	6
(Belarus) S Betov (Belarus) Y Shyla	1	4
(Ukraine) D Molchanov (Ukraine) S Stakhovsky	5	6^{5}
(India) P Gunneswaran (India) V Vardhan	7	7^{7}
(Lithuania) L Grigelis (Czech Republic) Z Kolář	6	6
4	(Italy) R Ghedin (Russia) D Matsukevich	1	4
(Japan) T Matsui (India) R Ramanathan	7	4	[10]
WC	(Uzbekistan) F Dustov (Uzbekistan) S Fayziev	5	6	[7]

Semifinals
1	(Chile) H Podlipnik-Castillo (Belarus) A Vasilevski	6^{5}	6	[2]
(India) P Gunneswaran (India) V Vardhan	7^{7}	3	[10]
(Lithuania) L Grigelis (Czech Republic) Z Kolář	6	6
(Japan) T Matsui (India) R Ramanathan	3	4

Final
(India) P Gunneswaran (India) V Vardhan	6^{2}	3
(Lithuania) L Grigelis (Czech Republic) Z Kolář	7^{7}	6
