= 2018 Samarkand Challenger – Doubles =

Doubles
- 2018 Samarkand Challenger

Final
- Champions: (India) Sriram Balaji (India) Vishnu Vardhan
- Runners-up: (Russia) Mikhail Elgin (Uzbekistan) Denis Istomin
- Score: Walkover

Events
Singles	Doubles
← 2017 ·	Samarkand Challenger	· 2019 →

Laurynas Grigelis and Zdeněk Kolář were the defending champions but chose not to defend their title.

Sriram Balaji and Vishnu Vardhan won the title after Mikhail Elgin and Denis Istomin withdrew from the final.

== Seeds ==
1. (India) Sriram Balaji / (India) Vishnu Vardhan (champions)
2. (Serbia) Nikola Čačić / (Switzerland) Luca Margaroli (semifinals)
3. (India) Saketh Myneni / (India) Vijay Sundar Prashanth (quarterfinals)
4. (Kazakhstan) Timur Khabibulin / (Ukraine) Vladyslav Manafov (semifinals)

== Draw ==
=== Key ===
- Q = Qualifier
- WC = Wild card
- LL = Lucky loser
- Alt = Alternate
- SE = Special exempt
- PR = Protected ranking
- ITF = ITF entry
- JE = Junior exempt
- w/o = Walkover
- r = Retired
- d = Defaulted
- SR = Special ranking

First round
1	(India) S Balaji (India) V Vardhan	7^{7}	6
Alt	(Belarus) S Betov (Belarus) Y Shyla	6^{2}	4
(Russia) T Gabashvili (Serbia) N Milojević	6	6
(Argentina) P Cachin (Serbia) M Zekić	2	2
4	(Kazakhstan) T Khabibulin (Ukraine) V Manafov	6	6
Alt	(Spain) D Muñoz de la Nava (Spain) M Vilella Martínez	4	3
WC	(Uzbekistan) S Fayziev (Uzbekistan) J Karimov	6	6
WC	(Uzbekistan) F Dustov (Uzbekistan) Shonigmatjon Shofayziyev	4	1
(Russia) M Elgin (Uzbekistan) D Istomin	7^{7}	6
WC	(Uzbekistan) S Fomin (Uzbekistan) K Sultanov	6^{3}	2
(Czech Republic) M Gengel (France) T Lamasine	4	4
3	(India) S Myneni (India) VS Prashanth	6	6
(Russia) I Gakhov (Russia) A Pavlioutchenkov	3	6	[10]
(Spain) Carlos Boluda-Purkiss (Spain) R Ortega Olmedo	6	3	[5]
Alt	(Argentina) M Peña López (Russia) R Safiullin	4	5
2	(Serbia) N Čačić (Switzerland) L Margaroli	6	7

Quarterfinals
1	(India) S Balaji (India) V Vardhan	6	6
(Russia) T Gabashvili (Serbia) N Milojević	3	4
4	(Kazakhstan) T Khabibulin (Ukraine) V Manafov	6	6
WC	(Uzbekistan) S Fayziev (Uzbekistan) J Karimov	4	3
(Russia) M Elgin (Uzbekistan) D Istomin	7	3	[10]
3	(India) S Myneni (India) VS Prashanth	5	6	[8]
(Russia) I Gakhov (Russia) A Pavlioutchenkov	2	4
2	(Serbia) N Čačić (Switzerland) L Margaroli	6	6

Semifinals
1	(India) S Balaji (India) V Vardhan	7^{7}	6
4	(Kazakhstan) T Khabibulin (Ukraine) V Manafov	6^{1}	3
(Russia) M Elgin (Uzbekistan) D Istomin	6	2	[10]
2	(Serbia) N Čačić (Switzerland) L Margaroli	4	6	[3]

Final
1	(India) S Balaji (India) V Vardhan	w/o
(Russia) M Elgin (Uzbekistan) D Istomin
