= 2011 Samarkand Challenger =

- Date: 8–14 August
- Edition: 15th
- Location: Samarkand, Uzbekistan

Champions

Singles
- (Uzbekistan) Denis Istomin

Doubles
- (Russia) Michail Elgin / (Russia) Alexander Kudryavtsev
← 2010 ·	Samarkand Challenger	· 2012 →

The 2011 Samarkand Challenger was a professional tennis tournament played on clay courts. It was the 15th edition of the tournament which was part of the 2011 ATP Challenger Tour. It took place in Samarkand, Uzbekistan between 8 and 14 August 2011.

== ATP entrants ==
=== Seeds ===
Country	Player	Rank^{1}	Seed
UZB	Denis Istomin	81	1
RUS	Alexander Kudryavtsev	149	2
NED	Igor Sijsling	178	3
ROU	Victor Crivoi	182	4
SVK	Andrej Martin	193	5
TUN	Malek Jaziri	230	6
FRA	Jonathan Dasnières de Veigy	244	7
SVK	Ivo Klec	246	8

- ^{1} Rankings are as of August 1, 2011.

=== Other entrants ===
The following players received wildcards into the singles main draw:

- (Uzbekistan) Murad Inoyatov
- (Uzbekistan) Denis Istomin
- (Indonesia) Christopher Rungkat
- (Uzbekistan) Nigmat Shofayziev

The following players received entry from the qualifying draw:

- (Uzbekistan) Sarvar Ikramov
- (Uzbekistan) Temur Ismailov
- (Russia) Alexander Kudryavtsev
- (India) Divij Sharan

The following players received entry from the qualifying draw as a lucky loser:

- (Uzbekistan) Jakhongir Jalalov
- (Uzbekistan) Vaja Uzakov

== Champions ==
=== Singles ===
(Uzbekistan) Denis Istomin def. (Tunisia) Malek Jaziri, 7–6^{(7–2)}, ret.

=== Doubles ===
(Russia) Michail Elgin / (Russia) Alexander Kudryavtsev def. (Moldova) Radu Albot / (Russia) Andrey Kuznetsov, 7–6^{(7–4)}, 2–6, [10–7]
