= 2013 Samarkand Challenger =

- Date: 13–19 May
- Edition: 17th
- Draw: 32S / 16D
- Prize money: $50,000
- Surface: Clay
- Location: Samarkand, Uzbekistan

Champions

Singles
- (Russia) Teymuraz Gabashvili

Doubles
- (Uzbekistan) Farrukh Dustov / (Ukraine) Oleksandr Nedovyesov
← 2012 ·	Samarkand Challenger	· 2014 →

The 2013 Samarkand Challenger was a professional tennis tournament played on clay courts. It was the 17th edition of the tournament which was part of the 2013 ATP Challenger Tour. It took place in Samarkand, Uzbekistan between 13 and 19 May 2013.

== Singles main draw entrants ==
=== Seeds ===
Country	Player	Rank^{1}	Seed
CZE	Jiří Veselý	125	1
RUS	Teymuraz Gabashvili	177	2
UKR	Oleksandr Nedovyesov	186	3
RUS	Konstantin Kravchuk	190	4
CZE	Jan Mertl	200	5
ESP	Javier Martí	211	6
UZB	Farrukh Dustov	214	7
TPE	Chen Ti	216	8

- ^{1} Rankings are as of May 6, 2013.

=== Other entrants ===
The following players received wildcards into the singles main draw:

- (Uzbekistan) Sarvar Ikramov
- (Uzbekistan) Temur Ismailov
- (Uzbekistan) Sergey Shipilov
- (Uzbekistan) Vaja Uzakov

The following player received entry using a protected ranking:

- (Spain) Pere Riba

The following players received entry from the qualifying draw:

- (Belarus) Sergey Betov
- (Belarus) Aliaksandr Bury
- (Russia) Alexander Kudryavtsev
- (Ukraine) Denys Molchanov

== Doubles main draw entrants ==
=== Seeds ===
Country	Player	Country	Player	Rank^{1}	Seed
USA	James Cerretani	CAN	Adil Shamasdin	160	1
MDA	Radu Albot	AUS	Jordan Kerr	498	2
RUS	Teymuraz Gabashvili	UKR	Denys Molchanov	534	3
CRO	Toni Androić	CRO	Dino Marcan	589	4

- ^{1} Rankings are as of May 6, 2013.

=== Other entrants ===
The following pairs received wildcards into the doubles main draw:

- (Uzbekistan) Sanjar Fayziev / (Uzbekistan) Shonigmatjon Shofayziyev
- (Uzbekistan) Sarvar Ikramov / (Uzbekistan) Vaja Uzakov
- (Uzbekistan) Temur Ismailov / (Uzbekistan) Sergey Shipilov

The following pair received entry using a protected ranking:

- (Spain) Guillermo Olaso / (Spain) Pere Riba

== Champions ==
=== Singles ===
- (Russia) Teymuraz Gabashvili def. (Ukraine) Oleksandr Nedovyesov, 6–3, 6–4

=== Doubles ===
- (Uzbekistan) Farrukh Dustov / (Ukraine) Oleksandr Nedovyesov def. (Moldova) Radu Albot / (Australia) Jordan Kerr, 6–1, 7–6^{(9–7)}
