= 2010 Samarkand Challenger – Singles =

Singles
- 2010 Samarkand Challenger

Final
- Champion: (Slovakia) Andrej Martin
- Runner-up: (Slovakia) Marek Semjan
- Score: 6–4, 7–5

Events
Singles	Doubles
← 2009 ·	Samarkand Challenger	· 2011 →

Dustin Brown was the defending champion, but he chose to compete in Istanbul challenger instead.
Andrej Martin won the title, after won 6–4, 7–5 against his compatriot Marek Semjan in the final.

== Seeds ==
1. (Slovenia) Blaž Kavčič (quarterfinals)
2. (Spain) Óscar Hernández (first round)
3. (Russia) Andrey Kuznetsov (second round)
4. (France) Guillaume Rufin (first round)
5. (Russia) Evgeny Kirillov (second round)
6. (Slovakia) Andrej Martin (champion)
7. (Slovakia) Marek Semjan (final)
8. (Latvia) Andis Juška (semifinals, retired due to stomach ache)

== Draw ==
=== Key ===
- Q = Qualifier
- WC = Wild card
- LL = Lucky loser
- Alt = Alternate
- SE = Special exempt
- PR = Protected ranking
- ITF = ITF entry
- JE = Junior exempt
- w/o = Walkover
- r = Retired
- d = Defaulted
- SR = Special ranking

=== Finals ===
Semifinals
(Estonia) Jürgen Zopp	4	6	6^{5}
7	(Slovakia) Marek Semjan	6	3	7
8	(Latvia) Andis Juška	4^{r}
6/Q	(Slovakia) Andrej Martin	5

Final
7	(Slovakia) Marek Semjan	4	5
6/Q	(Slovakia) Andrej Martin	6	7

=== Top half ===
First round
1	(Slovenia) B Kavčič	6	6
WC	(Brazil) T Fernandes	2	2
WC	(Uzbekistan) A Saidmukhamedov	2	1
(Spain) C Poch-Gradin	6	6
(Ukraine) D Molchanov	3	2
(Estonia) J Zopp	6	6
(Germany) A Flock	6	3	1
5	(Russia) E Kirillov	4	6	6
3	(Russia) A Kuznetsov	6	6
(Czech Republic) J Minář	4	4
(New Zealand) J Statham	5	5
(Russia) V Rudnev	7	7
WC	(Uzbekistan) M Inoyatov	6	6
(Russia) A Kumantsov	4	0
(Argentina) J-M Valverde	3	3
7	(Slovakia) M Semjan	6	6

Second round
1	(Slovenia) B Kavčič	6^{9}	6	6
(Spain) C Poch-Gradin	7	3	4
(Estonia) J Zopp	6	7
5	(Russia) E Kirillov	3	6^{7}
3	(Russia) A Kuznetsov	3	6	4
(Russia) V Rudnev	6	2	6
WC	(Uzbekistan) M Inoyatov	4	2
7	(Slovakia) M Semjan	6	6

Quarterfinals
1	(Slovenia) B Kavčič	6	5	5
(Estonia) J Zopp	1	7	7
(Russia) V Rudnev	4	6^{4}
7	(Slovakia) M Semjan	6	7

Semifinals
(Estonia) J Zopp	4	6	6^{5}
7	(Slovakia) M Semjan	6	3	7

=== Bottom half ===
First round
8	(Latvia) A Juška	6	2	6
Q	(France) A Michon	4	6	3
(Kazakhstan) A Kedryuk	6	4	3
(Russia) M Ledovskikh	4	6	6
WC	(Uzbekistan) V Uzakov	3	4
Q	(Lithuania) L Grigelis	6	6
(New Zealand) M Venus	6	7
4	(France) G Rufin	2	6^{6}
6/Q	(Slovakia) A Martin	7	6^{3}	6
Q	(Ukraine) A Smirnov	5	7	3
(Russia) M Elgin	6	5	7
SE	(South Korea) W-s Jun	2	7	5
(Serbia) B Pašanski	6	6
(Germany) D Blömke	4	4
(Chinese Taipei) T-h Yang	6	6
2	(Spain) Ó Hernández	1	2

Second round
8	(Latvia) A Juška	6	7
(Russia) M Ledovskikh	4	6^{1}
Q	(Lithuania) L Grigelis	6	3	6^{3}
(New Zealand) M Venus	2	6	7
6/Q	(Slovakia) A Martin	6	6
(Russia) M Elgin	2	3
(Serbia) B Pašanski	4	1
(Chinese Taipei) T-h Yang	6	6

Quarterfinals
8	(Latvia) A Juška	7	6
(New Zealand) M Venus	6^{2}	3
6/Q	(Slovakia) A Martin	7	6
(Chinese Taipei) T-h Yang	5	3

Semifinals
8	(Latvia) A Juška	4^{r}
6/Q	(Slovakia) A Martin	5
