= 2016 Samarkand Challenger – Singles =

Singles
- 2016 Samarkand Challenger

Final
- Champion: (Russia) Karen Khachanov
- Runner-up: (Spain) Rubén Ramírez Hidalgo
- Score: 6–1, 6–7^{(6–8)}, 6–1

Events
| Singles | Doubles |
| ← 2015 · | Samarkand Challenger | · 2017 → |

Teymuraz Gabashvili was the defending champion, but chose not to defend his title.

Karen Khachanov won the title after defeating Rubén Ramírez Hidalgo 6–1, 6–7^{(6–8)}, 6–1 in the final.

== Seeds ==
1. (Russia) Karen Khachanov (champion)
2. (Moldova) Radu Albot (quarterfinals)
3. (Israel) Amir Weintraub (quarterfinals)
4. (Spain) Jordi Samper Montaña (second round)
5. (Uzbekistan) Farrukh Dustov (first round, retired)
6. (Kazakhstan) Dmitry Popko (second round)
7. (Serbia) Nikola Milojević (first round)
8. (Spain) Enrique López Pérez (first round)

== Draw ==
=== Key ===
- Q = Qualifier
- WC = Wild card
- LL = Lucky loser
- Alt = Alternate
- SE = Special exempt
- PR = Protected ranking
- ITF = ITF entry
- JE = Junior exempt
- w/o = Walkover
- r = Retired
- d = Defaulted
- SR = Special ranking

=== Finals ===
Semifinals
1 | (Russia) Karen Khachanov | 6 | 0
(Argentina) Agustín Velotti | 2 | 0^{r}
(Spain) Rubén Ramírez Hidalgo | 2 | 7^{7} | 7^{7}
(India) Ramkumar Ramanathan | 6 | 6^{5} | 6^{0}

Final
1 | (Russia) Karen Khachanov | 6 | 6^{6} | 6
(Spain) Rubén Ramírez Hidalgo | 1 | 7^{8} | 1

=== Top half ===
First round
1 | (Russia) K Khachanov | 6 | 7
Q | (Italy) Francesco Vilardo | 2 | 5
(South Africa) L Harris | 7 | 3 | 6
Q | (Israel) BT Botzer | 5 | 6 | 0
(Austria) B Trinker | 1 | 0
(Belarus) I Ivashka | 6 | 6
(Serbia) M Tepavac | 6 | 6
8 | (Spain) E López Pérez | 3 | 2
4 | (Spain) J Samper-Montaña | 6 | 6
WC | (Uzbekistan) Shonigmatjon Shofayziyev | 3 | 1
(Argentina) A Velotti | 6 | 6
WC | (Uzbekistan) T Ismailov | 4 | 1
Q | (Russia) M Elgin | 5 | 4
(Portugal) FF Silva | 7 | 6
(Georgia (country)) A Metreveli | 2 | 3
6 | (Kazakhstan) D Popko | 6 | 6

Second round
1 | (Russia) K Khachanov | 6 | 6
(South Africa) L Harris | 2 | 3
(Belarus) I Ivashka | 4 | 7^{8} | 6
(Serbia) M Tepavac | 6 | 6^{6} | 3
4 | (Spain) J Samper-Montaña | 6 | 4 | 0
(Argentina) A Velotti | 3 | 6 | 6
(Portugal) FF Silva | 7^{8} | 6
6 | (Kazakhstan) D Popko | 6^{6} | 1

Quarterfinals
1 | (Russia) K Khachanov | 7^{7} | 6
(Belarus) I Ivashka | 6^{5} | 3
(Argentina) A Velotti | 6 | 5 | 6
(Portugal) FF Silva | 3 | 7 | 4

Semifinals
1 | (Russia) K Khachanov | 6 | 0
(Argentina) A Velotti | 2 | 0^{r}

=== Bottom half ===
First round
5 | (Uzbekistan) F Dustov | 1 | 0^{r}
(Spain) R Ramírez Hidalgo | 6 | 0
WC | (Uzbekistan) Pavel Tsoy | 6^{2} | 1
(Japan) Y Uchiyama | 7^{7} | 6
(Italy) A Bega | 6 | 7
(Colombia) N Barrientos | 3 | 5
(Brazil) C Zampieri | 7^{7} | 2 | 4
3 | (Israel) A Weintraub | 6^{4} | 6 | 6
7 | (Serbia) N Milojević | 6 | 5 | 1
(Canada) S Diez | 3 | 7 | 6
Q | (Russia) M Kalovelonis | 4 | 3
(India) R Ramanathan | 6 | 6
WC | (Uzbekistan) S Fayziev | 4 | 5
(Russia) A Karatsev | 6 | 7
(Chinese Taipei) T-h Yang | 6^{3} | 4
2 | (Moldova) R Albot | 7^{7} | 6

Second round
(Spain) R Ramírez Hidalgo | 6 | 6
(Japan) Y Uchiyama | 1 | 4
(Italy) A Bega | 6 | 4 | 2
3 | (Israel) A Weintraub | 3 | 6 | 6
(Canada) S Diez | 5 | 3
(India) R Ramanathan | 7 | 6
(Russia) A Karatsev | 6^{4} | 7 | 2
2 | (Moldova) R Albot | 7^{7} | 5 | 6

Quarterfinals
(Spain) R Ramírez Hidalgo | 6 | 6
3 | (Israel) A Weintraub | 2 | 4
(India) R Ramanathan | 6 | 6
2 | (Moldova) R Albot | 4 | 4

Semifinals
(Spain) R Ramírez Hidalgo | 2 | 7^{7} | 7^{7}
(India) R Ramanathan | 6 | 6^{5} | 6^{0}
