= 2017 Samarkand Challenger – Singles =

Singles
- 2017 Samarkand Challenger

Final
- Champion: (Spain) Adrián Menéndez Maceiras
- Runner-up: (Bosnia and Herzegovina) Aldin Šetkić
- Score: 6–4, 6–2

Events
Singles	Doubles
← 2016 ·	Samarkand Challenger	· 2018 →

Karen Khachanov was the defending champion but chose not to defend his title.

== Seeds ==
1. (Ukraine) Sergiy Stakhovsky (second round)
2. (Russia) Teymuraz Gabashvili (quarterfinals)
3. (Chinese Taipei) Jason Jung (semifinals)
4. (Spain) Adrián Menéndez Maceiras (champion)
5. (United States) Michael Mmoh (first round)
6. (Belgium) Joris De Loore (second round, retired)
7. (Serbia) Nikola Milojević (quarterfinals)
8. (Kazakhstan) Dmitry Popko (second round)

== Draw ==
=== Key ===
- Q = Qualifier
- WC = Wild card
- LL = Lucky loser
- Alt = Alternate
- SE = Special exempt
- PR = Protected ranking
- ITF = ITF entry
- JE = Junior exempt
- w/o = Walkover
- r = Retired
- d = Defaulted
- SR = Special ranking

=== Finals ===
Semifinals
(Bosnia and Herzegovina) Aldin Šetkić	6	6
3	(Chinese Taipei) Jason Jung	4	3
4	(Spain) Adrián Menéndez Maceiras	6	6
(Belarus) Ilya Ivashka	4	4

Final
(Bosnia and Herzegovina) Aldin Šetkić	4	2
4	(Spain) Adrián Menéndez Maceiras	6	6

=== Top half ===
First round
1	(Ukraine) S Stakhovsky	7^{7}	6
SE	(Turkey) C İlkel	6^{2}	2
(Australia) C O'Connell	3	6	3
(Bosnia and Herzegovina) A Šetkić	6	3	6
(Belarus) E Gerasimov	6	6^{6}	6
(Lithuania) L Grigelis	4	7^{8}	3
WC	(Uzbekistan) T Ismailov	4	6	6^{5}
8	(Kazakhstan) D Popko	6	4	7^{7}
3	(Chinese Taipei) J Jung	3	7^{7}	6
(India) P Gunneswaran	6	6^{1}	4
WC	(Estonia) K Raisma	4	4
Q	(Ukraine) D Molchanov	6	6
(Belgium) Clément Geens	4	3
(Czech Republic) Z Kolář	6	6
(Russia) A Vatutin	6^{5}	6	6
5	(United States) M Mmoh	7^{7}	1	3

Second round
1	(Ukraine) S Stakhovsky	6	6^{8}	4
(Bosnia and Herzegovina) A Šetkić	4	7^{10}	6
(Belarus) E Gerasimov	6	6
8	(Kazakhstan) D Popko	3	4
3	(Chinese Taipei) J Jung	6	4	6
Q	(Ukraine) D Molchanov	4	6	2
(Czech Republic) Z Kolář	7^{7}	4	4
(Russia) A Vatutin	6^{3}	6	6

Quarterfinals
(Bosnia and Herzegovina) A Šetkić	6	7^{8}
(Belarus) E Gerasimov	1	6^{6}
3	(Chinese Taipei) J Jung	7^{7}	7^{7}
(Russia) A Vatutin	6^{3}	6^{4}

Semifinals
(Bosnia and Herzegovina) A Šetkić	6	6
3	(Chinese Taipei) J Jung	4	3

=== Bottom half ===
First round
7	(Serbia) N Milojević	6	6^{4}	6
(Czech Republic) Marek Jaloviec	3	7^{7}	4
WC	(Uzbekistan) S Fayziev	1	3
(Egypt) K-M Maamoun	6	6
(Russia) A Kudryavtsev	4	2
(Kazakhstan) A Nedovyesov	6	6
(India) R Ramanathan	6	3	6^{2}
4	(Spain) A Menéndez Maceiras	3	6	7^{7}
6	(Belgium) J De Loore	7^{7}	6
(Lithuania) R Berankis	6^{4}	2
(Belarus) I Ivashka	7^{7}	6
Q	(Germany) K Krawietz	6^{5}	2
Q	(Serbia) D Petrović	4	6	6
Q	(Russia) E Karlovskiy	6	3	4
WC	(Uzbekistan) F Dustov	4	2
2	(Russia) T Gabashvili	6	6

Second round
7	(Serbia) N Milojević	4	7	7
(Egypt) K-M Maamoun	6	5	5
(Kazakhstan) A Nedovyesov	3	6	1
4	(Spain) A Menéndez Maceiras	6	3	6
6	(Belgium) J De Loore	2	0^{r}
(Belarus) I Ivashka	6	0
Q	(Serbia) D Petrović	4	6^{3}
2	(Russia) T Gabashvili	6	7^{7}

Quarterfinals
7	(Serbia) N Milojević	3	6	4
4	(Spain) A Menéndez Maceiras	6	2	6
(Belarus) I Ivashka	6	6
2	(Russia) T Gabashvili	3	2

Semifinals
4	(Spain) A Menéndez Maceiras	6	6
(Belarus) I Ivashka	4	4
