= 2012 Samarkand Challenger – Singles =

Singles
- 2012 Samarkand Challenger

Final
- Champion: (Serbia) Dušan Lajović
- Runner-up: (Uzbekistan) Farrukh Dustov
- Score: 6–3, 6–2

Events
Singles	Doubles
- Samarkand Challenger

The 2012 Samarkand Challenger was a professional tennis tournament played on clay courts in Samarkand, Uzbekistan between 6 and 12 August 2012. In the singles part of the tournament, Denis Istomin was the defending champion, but chose not to compete.
Dušan Lajović won the title, defeating Farrukh Dustov 6–3, 6–2 in the final.

== Seeds ==
1. (Russia) Igor Kunitsyn (first round)
2. (Kazakhstan) Andrey Golubev (quarterfinals)
3. (Serbia) Dušan Lajović (champion)
4. (Slovakia) Kamil Čapkovič (first round)
5. (Uzbekistan) Farrukh Dustov (final)
6. (Ukraine) Ivan Sergeyev (quarterfinals)
7. (Australia) Brydan Klein (second round)
8. (Slovakia) Andrej Martin (quarterfinals)

== Draw ==
Key

- Q = Qualifier
- WC = Wild card
- LL = Lucky loser
- Alt = Alternate
- ITF = ITF entry
- PR = Protected ranking
- SR = Special ranking
- SE = Special exempt
- JE = Junior exempt
- JR = Junior Accelerator Programme entrant
- CO = College Accelerator Programme entrant
- NG = Next Gen Accelerator Program entrant
- w/o = Walkover
- r = Retired
- d = Defaulted

=== Finals ===
Semifinals
(Ukraine) Oleksandr Nedovyesov	3	4
3	(Serbia) Dušan Lajović	6	6
Q	(India) Sriram Balaji	3	1
5	(Uzbekistan) Farrukh Dustov	6	6

Final
3	(Serbia) Dušan Lajović	6	6
5	(Uzbekistan) Farrukh Dustov	3	2

=== Top half ===
First round
1	(Russia) I Kunitsyn	1	2
(Austria) G Melzer	6	6
(India) V Vardhan	6	3	6
WC	(Uzbekistan) S Ikramov	3	6	2
(Russia) Victor Baluda	0	1
(Ukraine) Oleksandr Nedovyesov	6	6
LL	(Russia) D Matsukevich	3	6	4
7	(Australia) B Klein	6	4	6
3	(Serbia) D Lajović	6	3	6
(Russia) E Kirillov	1	6	3
Q	(Slovakia) Adrian Sikora	6	5	7^{7}
(Chile) H Podlipnik-Castillo	3	7	6^{3}
(Kazakhstan) Y Schukin	6	6
(France) Axel Michon	3	4
PR	(Sweden) E Eleskovic	5	2
6	(Ukraine) I Sergeyev	7	6

Second round
(Austria) G Melzer	6	7^{7}
(India) V Vardhan	4	6^{1}
(Ukraine) O Nedovyesov	6	6
7	(Australia) B Klein	3	4
3	(Serbia) D Lajović	7^{7}	6
Q	(Slovakia) Adrian Sikora	6^{2}	4
(Kazakhstan) Y Schukin	3	6	2
6	(Ukraine) I Sergeyev	6	0	6

Quarterfinals
(Austria) G Melzer	4	6^{7}
(Ukraine) O Nedovyesov	6	7^{9}
3	(Serbia) D Lajović	6	2	6
6	(Ukraine) I Sergeyev	4	6	4

Semifinals
(Ukraine) O Nedovyesov	3	4
3	(Serbia) D Lajović	6	6

=== Bottom half ===
First round
8	(Slovakia) A Martin	3	6	6
WC	(Uzbekistan) Temur Ismailov	6	0	4
(Slovakia) Norbert Gombos	6	6
(Japan) Yasutaka Uchiyama	1	3
Q	(India) Sriram Balaji	6	6
WC	(Uzbekistan) Vaja Uzakov	2	4
(Czech Republic) Michal Konečný	6	6
4	(Slovakia) K Čapkovič	4	2
5	(Uzbekistan) F Dustov	7^{7}	6
(Italy) R Bellotti	6^{4}	3
Q	(Germany) Jaan-Frederik Brunken	5	6^{3}
(Indonesia) C Rungkat	7	7^{7}
WC	(Uzbekistan) Sergey Shipilov	3	5
(South Africa) Ruan Roelofse	6	7
Q	(Belarus) Dzmitry Zhyrmont	4	4
2	(Kazakhstan) A Golubev	6	6

Second round
8	(Slovakia) A Martin	7^{8}	7^{7}
(Slovakia) N Gombos	6^{6}	6^{2}
Q	(India) S Balaji	6	7^{7}
(Czech Republic) M Konečný	4	6^{5}
5	(Uzbekistan) F Dustov	6	6
(Indonesia) C Rungkat	4	2
(South Africa) R Roelofse	1	6^{3}
2	(Kazakhstan) A Golubev	6	7^{7}

Quarterfinals
8	(Slovakia) A Martin	4	3
Q	(India) S Balaji	6	6
5	(Uzbekistan) F Dustov	7^{8}	7
2	(Kazakhstan) A Golubev	6^{6}	5

Semifinals
Q	(India) S Balaji	3	1
5	(Uzbekistan) F Dustov	6	6
