= 2014 Samarkand Challenger =

- Date: 12–17 May
- Edition: 18th
- Draw: 32S / 16D
- Prize money: $50,000
- Surface: Clay
- Location: Samarkand, Uzbekistan

Champions

Singles
- (Uzbekistan) Farrukh Dustov

Doubles
- (Belarus) Sergey Betov / (Belarus) Aliaksandr Bury
← 2013 ·	Samarkand Challenger	· 2015 →

The 2014 Samarkand Challenger was a professional tennis tournament played on clay courts. It was the 18th edition of the tournament which was part of the 2014 ATP Challenger Tour. It took place in Samarkand, Uzbekistan between 12 and 17 May 2014.

== Singles main-draw entrants ==
=== Seeds ===
Country	Player	Rank^{1}	Seed
UZB	Denis Istomin	55	1
BIH	Damir Džumhur	131	2
AUT	Gerald Melzer	151	3
UZB	Farrukh Dustov	165	4
CRO	Toni Androić	222	5
CAN	Filip Peliwo	223	6
CHI	Hans Podlipnik Castillo	224	7
~~ESP~~	~~Gerard Granollers~~	~~227~~	~~8~~
LTU	Laurynas Grigelis	232	9

- ^{1} Rankings are as of May 5, 2014.

=== Other entrants ===
The following players received wildcards into the singles main draw:

- (Uzbekistan) Sarvar Ikramov
- (Uzbekistan) Temur Ismailov
- (Russia) Karen Khachanov
- (Uzbekistan) Vaja Uzakov

The following players received entry from the qualifying draw:

- (Russia) Anton Zaitcev
- (Uzbekistan) Sanjar Fayziev
- (Ukraine) Denys Molchanov
- (Russia) Alexander Lobkov

== Doubles main-draw entrants ==
=== Seeds ===
Country	Player	Country	Player	Rank^{1}	Seed
IRL	James Cluskey	IND	Saketh Myneni	345	1
BLR	Sergey Betov	BLR	Aliaksandr Bury	373	2
UZB	Farrukh Dustov	UKR	Denys Molchanov	404	3
NED	Antal van der Duim	NED	Boy Westerhof	417	4

- ^{1} Rankings are as of May 5, 2014.

=== Other entrants ===
The following pairs received wildcards into the doubles main draw:

- (Uzbekistan) Sarvar Ikramov / (Uzbekistan) Djurabeck Karimov
- (Uzbekistan) Shonigmatjon Shofayziyev / (Uzbekistan) Vaja Uzakov
- (Uzbekistan) Sanjar Fayziev / (Uzbekistan) Temur Ismailov

== Champions ==
=== Singles ===
- (Uzbekistan) Farrukh Dustov def. (Russia) Aslan Karatsev, 7–6^{(7–4)}, 6–1

=== Doubles ===
- (Belarus) Sergey Betov / (Belarus) Aliaksandr Bury def. (Uzbekistan) Shonigmatjon Shofayziyev / (Uzbekistan) Vaja Uzakov, 6–4, 6–3
