= 2017 Samarkand Challenger =

- Date: 15 – 20 May
- Edition: 21st
- Draw: 32S / 16D
- Surface: Clay
- Location: Samarkand, Uzbekistan

Champions

Singles
- (Spain) Adrián Menéndez Maceiras

Doubles
- (Lithuania) Laurynas Grigelis / (Czech Republic) Zdeněk Kolář
← 2016 ·	Samarkand Challenger	· 2018 →

The 2017 Samarkand Challenger was a professional tennis tournament played on clay courts. It was the 21st edition of the tournament which was part of the 2017 ATP Challenger Tour. It took place in Samarkand, Uzbekistan between 15 and 20 May 2017.

== Singles main-draw entrants ==
=== Seeds ===
Country	Player	Rank^{1}	Seed
UKR	Sergiy Stakhovsky	96	1
RUS	Teymuraz Gabashvili	151	2
TPE	Jason Jung	167	3
ESP	Adrián Menéndez Maceiras	177	4
USA	Michael Mmoh	183	5
BEL	Joris De Loore	190	6
SRB	Nikola Milojević	191	7
KAZ	Dmitry Popko	203	8

- ^{1} Rankings are as of May 8, 2017.

=== Other entrants ===
The following players received wildcards into the singles main draw:

- (Uzbekistan) Farrukh Dustov
- (Uzbekistan) Sanjar Fayziev
- (Uzbekistan) Temur Ismailov
- (Estonia) Kenneth Raisma

The following player received entry into the singles main draw as a special exempt:

- (Turkey) Cem İlkel

The following players received entry from the qualifying draw:

- (Russia) Evgeny Karlovskiy
- (Germany) Kevin Krawietz
- (Ukraine) Denys Molchanov
- (Serbia) Danilo Petrović

== Champions ==
=== Singles ===
- (Spain) Adrián Menéndez Maceiras def. (Bosnia and Herzegovina) Aldin Šetkić 6–4, 6–2.

=== Doubles ===
- (Lithuania) Laurynas Grigelis / (Czech Republic) Zdeněk Kolář def. (India) Prajnesh Gunneswaran / (India) Vishnu Vardhan 7–6^{(7–2)}, 6–3.
