= 2014 Samarkand Challenger – Doubles =

Doubles
- 2014 Samarkand Challenger

Final
- Champions: (Belarus) Sergey Betov (Belarus) Alexander Bury
- Runners-up: (Uzbekistan) Shonigmatjon Shofayziyev (Uzbekistan) Vaja Uzakov
- Score: 6–4, 6–3

Events
Singles	Doubles
- Samarkand Challenger

Oleksandr Nedovyesov and Ivan Sergeyev were the defending champions, but decided not to compete.

Sergey Betov and Alexander Bury won the title, defeating Shonigmatjon Shofayziyev and Vaja Uzakov in the final, 6–4, 6–3.

== Seeds ==
1. (Republic of Ireland) James Cluskey / (India) Saketh Myneni (first round)
2. (Belarus) Sergey Betov / (Belarus) Alexander Bury (champions)
3. (Uzbekistan) Farrukh Dustov / (Ukraine) Denys Molchanov (quarterfinals)
4. (Netherlands) Antal van der Duim / (Netherlands) Boy Westerhof (quarterfinals)

== Draw ==
Key

- Q = Qualifier
- WC = Wild card
- LL = Lucky loser
- Alt = Alternate
- ITF = ITF entry
- PR = Protected ranking
- SR = Special ranking
- SE = Special exempt
- JE = Junior exempt
- JR = Junior Accelerator Programme entrant
- CO = College Accelerator Programme entrant
- NG = Next Gen Accelerator Program entrant
- w/o = Walkover
- r = Retired
- d = Defaulted

=== Draw ===
First round
1	(Republic of Ireland) J Cluskey (India) S Myneni	5	4
(Chile) H Podlipnik-Castillo (Slovakia) Adrian Sikora	7	6
PR	(France) O Charroin (Canada) F Peliwo	7^{7}	6
(Russia) Alexander Lobkov (Ukraine) A Smirnov	6^{5}	4
3	(Uzbekistan) F Dustov (Ukraine) D Molchanov	6	6
WC	(Uzbekistan) S Ikramov (Uzbekistan) D Karimov	3	3
(India) S Balaji (India) J Nedunchezhiyan	6	6^{6}	[9]
WC	(Uzbekistan) Shonigmatjon Shofayziyev (Uzbekistan) V Uzakov	2	7^{8}	[11]
WC	(Uzbekistan) S Fayziev (Uzbekistan) T Ismailov	6^{2}	4
(Bosnia and Herzegovina) D Džumhur (Bosnia and Herzegovina) A Šetkić	7^{7}	6
(Croatia) T Androić (Croatia) B Ćorić	3	4
4	(Netherlands) Avd Duim (Netherlands) B Westerhof	6	6
(Austria) G Melzer (Austria) Marc Rath	6	6
(Russia) A Karatsev (Serbia) P Krstin	2	2
(Georgia (country)) N Basilashvili (Czech Republic) Michal Konečný	2	6^{3}
2	(Belarus) S Betov (Belarus) A Bury	6	7^{7}

Quarterfinals
(Chile) H Podlipnik-Castillo (Slovakia) A Sikora	4	6	[7]
PR	(France) O Charroin (Canada) F Peliwo	6	3	[10]
3	(Uzbekistan) F Dustov (Ukraine) D Molchanov	4	6	[9]
WC	(Uzbekistan) S Shofayziyev (Uzbekistan) V Uzakov	6	3	[11]
(Bosnia and Herzegovina) D Džumhur (Bosnia and Herzegovina) A Šetkić	6	6
4	(Netherlands) Avd Duim (Netherlands) B Westerhof	4	2
(Austria) G Melzer (Austria) M Rath	3	2
2	(Belarus) S Betov (Belarus) A Bury	6	6

Semifinals
PR	(France) O Charroin (Canada) F Peliwo	6	4	[9]
WC	(Uzbekistan) S Shofayziyev (Uzbekistan) V Uzakov	4	6	[11]
(Bosnia and Herzegovina) D Džumhur (Bosnia and Herzegovina) A Šetkić	3	4
2	(Belarus) S Betov (Belarus) A Bury	6	6

Final
WC	(Uzbekistan) S Shofayziyev (Uzbekistan) V Uzakov	4	3
2	(Belarus) S Betov (Belarus) A Bury	6	6
