= 2010 Samarkand Challenger =

- Date: August 9 – August 14
- Edition: 14th
- Location: Samarkand, Uzbekistan

Champions

Singles
- (Slovakia) Andrej Martin

Doubles
- (Latvia) Andis Juška / (Latvia) Deniss Pavlovs
← 2009 ·	Samarkand Challenger	· 2011 →

The 2010 Samarkand Challenger was a professional tennis tournament played on outdoor red clay courts. It was the fourteenth edition of the tournament which was part of the 2010 ATP Challenger Tour. It took place in Samarkand, Uzbekistan between 9 and 14 August 2010.

== ATP entrants ==
=== Seeds ===
Nationality	Player	Ranking*	Seeding
SLO	Blaž Kavčič	88	1
ESP	Óscar Hernández	158	2
RUS	Andrey Kuznetsov	167	3
FRA	Guillaume Rufin	174	4
RUS	Evgeny Kirillov	205	5
SVK	Andrej Martin	288	6
SVK	Marek Semjan	297	7
LAT	Andis Juška	312	8

- Rankings are as of August 2, 2010.

=== Other entrants ===
The following players received wildcards into the singles main draw:

- (Brazil) Tiago Fernandes
- (Uzbekistan) Murad Inoyatov
- (Uzbekistan) Abduvoris Saidmukhamedov
- (Uzbekistan) Vaja Uzakov

The following players received a Special Exempt into the main draw:

- (South Korea) Jun Woong-sun

The following players received entry from the qualifying draw:

- (Lithuania) Laurynas Grigelis
- (Slovakia) Andrej Martin
- (France) Axel Michon
- (Ukraine) Artem Smirnov

== Champions ==
=== Singles ===
(Slovakia) Andrej Martin def. (Slovakia) Marek Semjan, 6–4, 7–5

=== Doubles ===
(Latvia) Andis Juška / (Latvia) Deniss Pavlovs def. (Chinese Taipei) Lee Hsin-han / (Chinese Taipei) Yang Tsung-hua, 7–5, 6–3
