= 2016 Samarkand Challenger – Doubles =

Doubles
- 2016 Samarkand Challenger

Final
- Champion: (Russia) Denis Matsukevich (Belarus) Andrei Vasilevski
- Runner-up: (Chinese Taipei) Hsieh Cheng-peng (Chinese Taipei) Yang Tsung-hua
- Score: 6–4, 5–7, [10–5]

Events
Singles	Doubles
← 2015 ·	Samarkand Challenger	· 2017 →

Sergey Betov and Mikhail Elgin were the defending champions but lost to Hsieh Cheng-peng and Yang Tsung-hua in the semifinals.

Denis Matsukevich and Andrei Vasilevski won the title after defeating Hsieh Cheng-peng and Yang Tsung-hua 6–4, 5–7, [10–5] in the final.

== Seeds ==
1. (Belarus) Sergey Betov / (Russia) Mikhail Elgin (semifinals)
2. (South Africa) Dean O'Brien / (South Africa) Ruan Roelofse (quarterfinals)
3. (Italy) Riccardo Ghedin / (India) Jeevan Nedunchezhiyan (semifinals)
4. (Chinese Taipei) Hsieh Cheng-peng / (Chinese Taipei) Yang Tsung-hua (final)

== Draw ==
=== Key ===
- Q = Qualifier
- WC = Wild card
- LL = Lucky loser
- Alt = Alternate
- SE = Special exempt
- PR = Protected ranking
- ITF = ITF entry
- JE = Junior exempt
- w/o = Walkover
- r = Retired
- d = Defaulted
- SR = Special ranking

First round
1	(Belarus) S Betov (Russia) M Elgin	w/o
WC	(Uzbekistan) F Dustov (Uzbekistan) S Fayziev
(Russia) A Karatsev (Kazakhstan) D Popko
WC	(Uzbekistan) T Ismailov (Georgia (country)) A Metreveli	w/o
4	(Chinese Taipei) C-p Hsieh (Chinese Taipei) T-h Yang	5	7	[12]
WC	(Russia) M Kalovelonis (Uzbekistan) Shonigmatjon Shofayziyev	7	5	[10]
(Uruguay) A Behar (Spain) E López-Pérez
(Moldova) R Albot (Belarus) I Ivashka	w/o
(Serbia) N Milojević (Serbia) M Tepavac	w/o
(Portugal) FF Silva (Brazil) C Zampieri
(Colombia) N Barrientos (Canada) S Diez	1	4
3	(Italy) R Ghedin (India) J Nedunchezhiyan	6	6
PR	(Russia) D Matsukevich (Belarus) A Vasilevski	6^{4}	6	[10]
(Chinese Taipei) H-y Peng (Israel) A Weintraub	7^{7}	4	[8]
(Austria) B Trinker (Japan) Y Uchiyama
2	(South Africa) D O'Brien (South Africa) R Roelofse	w/o

Quarterfinals
1	(Belarus) S Betov (Russia) M Elgin	6	6
WC	(Uzbekistan) T Ismailov (Georgia (country)) A Metreveli	1	0
4	(Chinese Taipei) C-p Hsieh (Chinese Taipei) T-h Yang	6	6^{6}	[10]
(Moldova) R Albot (Belarus) I Ivashka	3	7^{8}	[6]
(Serbia) N Milojević (Serbia) M Tepavac
3	(Italy) R Ghedin (India) J Nedunchezhiyan	w/o
PR	(Russia) D Matsukevich (Belarus) A Vasilevski	6	6
2	(South Africa) D O'Brien (South Africa) R Roelofse	4	4

Semifinals
1	(Belarus) S Betov (Russia) M Elgin	6^{4}	1
4	(Chinese Taipei) C-p Hsieh (Chinese Taipei) T-h Yang	7^{7}	6
3	(Italy) R Ghedin (India) J Nedunchezhiyan	4	0
PR	(Russia) D Matsukevich (Belarus) A Vasilevski	6	6

Final
4	(Chinese Taipei) C-p Hsieh (Chinese Taipei) T-h Yang	4	7	[5]
PR	(Russia) D Matsukevich (Belarus) A Vasilevski	6	5	[10]
