= 2018 Samarkand Challenger =

- Date: 14–19 May
- Edition: 22nd
- Draw: 32S / 16D
- Surface: Clay
- Location: Samarkand, Uzbekistan

Champions

Singles
- (Italy) Luca Vanni

Doubles
- (India) Sriram Balaji / (India) Vishnu Vardhan
← 2017 ·	Samarkand Challenger	· 2019 →

The 2018 Samarkand Challenger was a professional tennis tournament played on clay courts. It was the 22nd edition of the tournament which was part of the 2018 ATP Challenger Tour. It took place in Samarkand, Uzbekistan between 14 and 19 May 2018.

== Singles main-draw entrants ==
=== Seeds ===
Country	Player	Rank^{1}	Seed
UZB	Denis Istomin	91	1
HUN	Attila Balázs	198	2
SRB	Nikola Milojević	200	3
BLR	Uladzimir Ignatik	225	4
RSA	Lloyd Harris	231	5
KAZ	Aleksandr Nedovyesov	232	6
BLR	Egor Gerasimov	236	7
TPE	Yang Tsung-hua	247	8

- ^{1} Rankings are as of May 7, 2018.

=== Other entrants ===
The following players received wildcards into the singles main draw:

- (Uzbekistan) Farrukh Dustov
- (Uzbekistan) Sanjar Fayziev
- (Uzbekistan) Denis Istomin
- (Uzbekistan) Jurabek Karimov

The following player received entry into the singles main draw as a special exempt:

- (Belarus) Sergey Betov

The following players received entry from the qualifying draw:

- (India) Sriram Balaji
- (Uzbekistan) Sergey Fomin
- (Argentina) Manuel Peña López
- (Russia) Roman Safiullin

== Champions ==
=== Singles ===
- (Italy) Luca Vanni def. (Spain) Mario Vilella Martínez 6–4, 6–4.

=== Doubles ===
- (India) Sriram Balaji / (India) Vishnu Vardhan def. (Russia) Mikhail Elgin / (Uzbekistan) Denis Istomin, walkover.
