= 2019 Samarkand Challenger – Singles =

Singles
- 2019 Samarkand Challenger

Final
- Champion: (Brazil) João Menezes
- Runner-up: (France) Corentin Moutet
- Score: 7–6^{(7–2)}, 7–6^{(9–7)}

Events
| Singles | Doubles |
- Samarkand Challenger

Luca Vanni was the defending champion but chose not to defend his title.

João Menezes won the title after defeating Corentin Moutet 7–6^{(7–2)}, 7–6^{(9–7)} in the final.

== Seeds ==
All seeds receive a bye into the second round.

1. (France) Corentin Moutet (final)
2. (Belarus) Egor Gerasimov (second round)
3. (Slovakia) Andrej Martin (semifinals)
4. (Kazakhstan) Aleksandr Nedovyesov (second round)
5. (Austria) Lucas Miedler (third round)
6. (Belarus) Uladzimir Ignatik (quarterfinals)
7. (Portugal) Gonçalo Oliveira (quarterfinals, retired)
8. (Brazil) Guilherme Clezar (second round)
9. (Dominican Republic) José Hernández-Fernández (quarterfinals)
10. (United States) Ulises Blanch (third round)
11. (Russia) Roman Safiullin (second round)
12. (Spain) Roberto Ortega Olmedo (quarterfinals)
13. (Russia) Pavel Kotov (third round)
14. (Dominican Republic) Roberto Cid Subervi (third round)
15. (India) Sumit Nagal (semifinals)
16. (El Salvador) Marcelo Arévalo (second round)

== Draw ==
Key

- Q = Qualifier
- WC = Wild card
- LL = Lucky loser
- Alt = Alternate
- ITF = ITF entry
- PR = Protected ranking
- SR = Special ranking
- SE = Special exempt
- JE = Junior exempt
- JR = Junior Accelerator Programme entrant
- CO = College Accelerator Programme entrant
- NG = Next Gen Accelerator Program entrant
- w/o = Walkover
- r = Retired
- d = Defaulted

=== Finals ===
Quarterfinals
1 | (France) Corentin Moutet | 6 | 5
7 | (Portugal) Gonçalo Oliveira | 2 | 2^{r}
3 | (Slovakia) Andrej Martin | 6 | 4 | 6
9 | (Dominican Republic) José Hernández-Fernández | 4 | 6 | 2
6 | (Belarus) Uladzimir Ignatik | 2 | 4
(Brazil) João Menezes | 6 | 6
12 | (Spain) Roberto Ortega Olmedo | 5 | 4
15 | (India) Sumit Nagal | 7 | 6

Semifinals
1 | (France) Corentin Moutet | 6 | 0 | 6
3 | (Slovakia) Andrej Martin | 4 | 6 | 2
(Brazil) João Menezes | 5 | 6 | 6
15 | (India) Sumit Nagal | 7 | 4 | 3

Final
1 | (France) Corentin Moutet | 6^{2} | 6^{7}
(Brazil) João Menezes | 7^{7} | 7^{9}

=== Top half ===
==== Section 1 ====
First round
ITF | (Uzbekistan) S Fayziev | 3 | 0
(France) A Escoffier | 6 | 6
WC | (Uzbekistan) T Ismailov | 1 | 0
(Russia) T Gabashvili | 6 | 6
(Australia) H Bourchier | 2 | 6^{3}
ITF | (Egypt) K-M Maamoun | 6 | 7^{7}
(Norway) V Durasovic | 6 | 3 | 6
(United Kingdom) B Klein | 4 | 6 | 3

Second round
1 | (France) C Moutet | 1 | 6 | 6
(France) A Escoffier | 6 | 3 | 1
(Russia) T Gabashvili | 4 | 4
13 | (Russia) P Kotov | 6 | 6
11 | (Russia) R Safiullin | 4 | 6^{3}
ITF | (Egypt) K-M Maamoun | 6 | 7^{7}
(Norway) V Durasovic | 3 | 2
7 | (Portugal) G Oliveira | 6 | 6

Third round
1 | (France) C Moutet | 4 | 6 | 6
13 | (Russia) P Kotov | 6 | 2 | 3
ITF | (Egypt) K-M Maamoun | 4 | 4
7 | (Portugal) G Oliveira | 6 | 6

Quarterfinals
1 | (France) C Moutet | 6 | 5
7 | (Portugal) G Oliveira | 2 | 2^{r}

==== Section 2 ====
First round
Q | (Russia) E Tiurnev | 1 | 6 | 6
Q | (Ukraine) V Manafov | 6 | 3 | 2
(Ukraine) I Marchenko | 2 | 2
(Argentina) R Olivo | 6 | 6
ITF | (Russia) A Zhurbin | 7^{11} | 6^{8} | 7
(Germany) Tobias Simon | 6^{9} | 7^{10} | 5
ITF | (Germany) P Torebko | 1 | 0
(Australia) A Vukic | 6 | 6

Second round
3 | (Slovakia) A Martin | 6 | 6
Q | (Russia) E Tiurnev | 3 | 4
(Argentina) R Olivo | 6 | 2 | 3
14 | (Dominican Republic) R Cid Subervi | 3 | 6 | 6
9 | (Dominican Republic) J Hernández-Fernández | 6 | 6^{7} | 6
ITF | (Russia) A Zhurbin | 4 | 7^{9} | 2
(Australia) A Vukic | 7 | 6
8 | (Brazil) G Clezar | 5 | 4

Third round
3 | (Slovakia) A Martin | 6 | 6
14 | (Dominican Republic) R Cid Subervi | 3 | 4
9 | (Dominican Republic) J Hernández-Fernández | 7^{7} | 6
(Australia) A Vukic | 6^{5} | 3

Quarterfinals
3 | (Slovakia) A Martin | 6 | 4 | 6
9 | (Dominican Republic) J Hernández-Fernández | 4 | 6 | 2

=== Bottom half ===
==== Section 3 ====
First round
(Brazil) T Seyboth Wild | 6 | 6
(India) A Kadhe | 0 | 3
Alt | (Italy) Fabrizio Ornago | 3 | 7^{7} | 3
ITF | (Finland) E Ruusuvuori | 6 | 6^{5} | 6
(Colombia) A González | 3 | 7^{7} | 4
(Kazakhstan) D Yevseyev | 6 | 6^{3} | 6
WC | (Uzbekistan) Olimjon Nabiev | 0 | 1
(Brazil) J Menezes | 6 | 6

Second round
6 | (Belarus) U Ignatik | 7^{7} | 4 | 6
(Brazil) T Seyboth Wild | 6^{5} | 6 | 2
ITF | (Finland) E Ruusuvuori | 2 | 4
10 | (United States) U Blanch | 6 | 6
16 | (El Salvador) M Arévalo | 6^{6} | 6 | 3
(Kazakhstan) D Yevseyev | 7^{8} | 3 | 6
(Brazil) J Menezes | 6 | 6
4 | (Kazakhstan) A Nedovyesov | 1 | 4

Third round
6 | (Belarus) U Ignatik | 7^{7} | 6^{2} | 7^{7}
10 | (United States) U Blanch | 6^{5} | 7^{7} | 6^{5}
(Kazakhstan) D Yevseyev | 3 | 1
(Brazil) J Menezes | 6 | 6

Quarterfinals
6 | (Belarus) U Ignatik | 2 | 4
(Brazil) J Menezes | 6 | 6

==== Section 4 ====
First round
(Spain) Carlos Boluda-Purkiss | 4 | 6 | 6
WC | (Kazakhstan) A Golubev | 6 | 3 | 4
(Uzbekistan) K Sultanov | 6^{3} | 6 | 2
WC | (Uzbekistan) S Fomin | 7^{7} | 3 | 6
(Russia) I Gakhov | 6 | 3 | 6^{11}
(France) S Doumbia | 4 | 6 | 7^{13}
(Australia) Jacob Grills | 3 | 6^{3}
WC | (Kazakhstan) D Popko | 6 | 7^{7}

Second round
5 | (Austria) L Miedler | 6 | 3 | 7
(Spain) C Boluda-Purkiss | 3 | 6 | 5
WC | (Uzbekistan) S Fomin | 4 | 3
12 | (Spain) R Ortega Olmedo | 6 | 6
15 | (India) S Nagal | 6 | 1 | 6
(France) S Doumbia | 4 | 6 | 1
WC | (Kazakhstan) D Popko | 6 | 7^{7}
2 | (Belarus) E Gerasimov | 3 | 6^{1}

Third round
5 | (Austria) L Miedler | 6^{3} | 2
12 | (Spain) R Ortega Olmedo | 7^{7} | 6
15 | (India) S Nagal | 7^{9} | 6
WC | (Kazakhstan) D Popko | 6^{7} | 3

Quarterfinals
12 | (Spain) R Ortega Olmedo | 5 | 4
15 | (India) S Nagal | 7 | 6
