= 2012 Samarkand Challenger – Doubles =

Doubles
- 2012 Samarkand Challenger

Final
- Champions: (Ukraine) Oleksandr Nedovyesov (Ukraine) Ivan Sergeyev
- Runners-up: (India) Divij Sharan (India) Vishnu Vardhan
- Score: 6–4, 7–6^{(7–1)}

Events
Singles	Doubles
- Samarkand Challenger

Michail Elgin and Alexandre Kudryavtsev were the defending champions; however, they both chose not to participate this year.
Oleksandr Nedovyesov and Ivan Sergeyev won in the final against Divij Sharan and Vishnu Vardhan.

== Seeds ==
1. (India) Divij Sharan / (India) Vishnu Vardhan (final)
2. (Kazakhstan) Andrey Golubev / (Kazakhstan) Yuri Schukin (first round)
3. (Slovakia) Kamil Čapkovič / (Australia) Brydan Klein (quarterfinals)
4. (Czech Republic) Michal Konecny / (Russia) Denis Matsukevich (quarterfinals)

== Draw ==
Key

- Q = Qualifier
- WC = Wild card
- LL = Lucky loser
- Alt = Alternate
- ITF = ITF entry
- PR = Protected ranking
- SR = Special ranking
- SE = Special exempt
- JE = Junior exempt
- JR = Junior Accelerator Programme entrant
- CO = College Accelerator Programme entrant
- NG = Next Gen Accelerator Program entrant
- w/o = Walkover
- r = Retired
- d = Defaulted

=== Draw ===
First round
1	(India) D Sharan (India) V Vardhan	6	6
WC	(Uzbekistan) Sergey Shipilov (Uzbekistan) Nigmat Shofayziev	4	2
(Russia) Sergei Krotiouk (Uzbekistan) Vaja Uzakov	1	4
(Russia) Victor Baluda (Japan) Yasutaka Uchiyama	6	6
3	(Slovakia) K Čapkovič (Australia) B Klein	6	7
WC	(Kyrgyzstan) D Duldaev (Uzbekistan) S Ikramov	3	5
(Italy) R Bellotti (Austria) G Melzer	7^{7}	6
(South Africa) Ruan Roelofse (Indonesia) C Rungkat	6^{3}	2
(Ukraine) O Nedovyesov (Ukraine) I Sergeyev	6	6
WC	(Uzbekistan) Rifat Biktyakov (Uzbekistan) Temur Ismailov	3	3
(India) N.Sriram Balaji (Germany) Jaan-Frederik Brunken	6^{6}	6	[3]
4	(Czech Republic) Michal Konecny (Russia) D Matsukevich	7^{8}	1	[10]
(Belarus) Egor Gerasimov (Belarus) Dzmitry Zhyrmont	4	3
(Slovakia) A Martin (Slovakia) Adrian Sikora	6	6
(Slovakia) Norbert Gombos (Chile) H Podlipnik	6	6
2	(Kazakhstan) A Golubev (Kazakhstan) Y Schukin	4	4

Quarterfinals
1	(India) D Sharan (India) V Vardhan	6	6
(Russia) V Baluda (Japan) Y Uchiyama	3	3
3	(Slovakia) K Čapkovič (Australia) B Klein	4	2
(Italy) R Bellotti (Austria) G Melzer	6	6
(Ukraine) O Nedovyesov (Ukraine) I Sergeyev	6^{2}	6	[10]
4	(Czech Republic) M Konecny (Russia) D Matsukevich	7^{7}	2	[5]
(Slovakia) A Martin (Slovakia) Adrian Sikora	3	6	[13]
(Slovakia) N Gombos (Chile) H Podlipnik	6	3	[11]

Semifinals
1	(India) D Sharan (India) V Vardhan	6	3	[10]
(Italy) R Bellotti (Austria) G Melzer	3	6	[3]
(Ukraine) O Nedovyesov (Ukraine) I Sergeyev	6	4	[10]
(Slovakia) A Martin (Slovakia) Adrian Sikora	4	6	[4]

Final
1	(India) D Sharan (India) V Vardhan	4	6^{1}
(Ukraine) O Nedovyesov (Ukraine) I Sergeyev	6	7^{1}
