= 2019 Samarkand Challenger – Doubles =

Doubles
- 2019 Samarkand Challenger

Final
- Champions: (Portugal) Gonçalo Oliveira (Belarus) Andrei Vasilevski
- Runners-up: (Uzbekistan) Sergey Fomin (Russia) Teymuraz Gabashvili
- Score: 3–6, 6–3, [10–4]

Events
| Singles | Doubles |
- Samarkand Challenger

Sriram Balaji and Vishnu Vardhan were the defending champions but chose not to defend their title.

Gonçalo Oliveira and Andrei Vasilevski won the title after defeating Sergey Fomin and Teymuraz Gabashvili 3–6, 6–3, [10–4] in the final.

== Seeds ==
1. (Portugal) Gonçalo Oliveira / (Belarus) Andrei Vasilevski (champions)
2. (El Salvador) Marcelo Arévalo / (Austria) Lucas Miedler (quarterfinals, withdrew)
3. (Kazakhstan) Timur Khabibulin / (Ukraine) Vladyslav Manafov (first round)
4. (Russia) Ivan Gakhov / (Russia) Alexander Pavlioutchenkov (quarterfinals)

== Draw ==
Key

- Q = Qualifier
- WC = Wild card
- LL = Lucky loser
- Alt = Alternate
- ITF = ITF entry
- PR = Protected ranking
- SR = Special ranking
- SE = Special exempt
- JE = Junior exempt
- JR = Junior Accelerator Programme entrant
- CO = College Accelerator Programme entrant
- NG = Next Gen Accelerator Program entrant
- w/o = Walkover
- r = Retired
- d = Defaulted

First round
1 | (Portugal) G Oliveira (Belarus) A Vasilevski | 6 | 3 | [10]
(India) A Kadhe (Kazakhstan) D Yevseyev | 4 | 6 | [6]
WC | (Uzbekistan) Shonigmatjon Shofayziyev (Uzbekistan) Amal Sultanbekov | 1 | 2
(United States) U Blanch (Argentina) R Olivo | 6 | 6
4 | (Russia) I Gakhov (Russia) A Pavlioutchenkov | 4 | 6 | [10]
WC | (Kazakhstan) A Golubev (Kazakhstan) D Popko | 6 | 3 | [7]
(Dominican Republic) J Hernández-Fernández (Russia) P Kotov | 6 | 1 | [13]
(Uzbekistan) S Fayziev (Uzbekistan) K Sultanov | 3 | 6 | [11]
WC | (Uzbekistan) S Fomin (Russia) T Gabashvili | 7 | 3 | [10]
ITF | (France) S Doumbia (Australia) Jacob Grills | 5 | 6 | [5]
ITF | (Finland) E Ruusuvuori (Russia) A Zhurbin | 6 | 4 | [10]
3 | (Kazakhstan) T Khabibulin (Ukraine) V Manafov | 3 | 6 | [7]
(Dominican Republic) R Cid Subervi (Spain) R Ortega Olmedo | 7^{7} | 6
Alt | (Russia) Anton Chekhov (United Kingdom) B Klein | 6^{2} | 3
(Belarus) U Ignatik (Kazakhstan) A Nedovyesov | 2 | 3
2 | (El Salvador) M Arévalo (Austria) L Miedler | 6 | 6

Quarterfinals
1 | (Portugal) G Oliveira (Belarus) A Vasilevski | 6 | 6^{5} | [11]
(United States) U Blanch (Argentina) R Olivo | 4 | 7^{7} | [9]
4 | (Russia) I Gakhov (Russia) A Pavlioutchenkov | 6 | 6^{6} | [7]
(Dominican Republic) J Hernández-Fernández (Russia) P Kotov | 4 | 7^{8} | [10]
WC | (Uzbekistan) S Fomin (Russia) T Gabashvili | 7 | 6
ITF | (Finland) E Ruusuvuori (Russia) A Zhurbin | 5 | 0
(Dominican Republic) R Cid Subervi (Spain) R Ortega Olmedo | w/o
2 | (El Salvador) M Arévalo (Austria) L Miedler

Semifinals
1 | (Portugal) G Oliveira (Belarus) A Vasilevski | 6 | 6
(Dominican Republic) J Hernández-Fernández (Russia) P Kotov | 3 | 4
WC | (Uzbekistan) S Fomin (Russia) T Gabashvili | 6 | 6
(Dominican Republic) R Cid Subervi (Spain) R Ortega Olmedo | 3 | 2

Final
1 | (Portugal) G Oliveira (Belarus) A Vasilevski | 3 | 6 | [10]
WC | (Uzbekistan) S Fomin (Russia) T Gabashvili | 6 | 3 | [4]
