= 2015 Samarkand Challenger =

- Date: 11–16 May
- Edition: 19th
- Draw: 32S / 16D
- Prize money: $50,000
- Surface: Clay
- Location: Samarkand, Uzbekistan

Champions

Singles
- (Russia) Teymuraz Gabashvili

Doubles
- (Belarus) Sergey Betov / (Russia) Michail Elgin
| ← 2014 · | Samarkand Challenger | · 2016 → |

The 2015 Samarkand Challenger was a professional tennis tournament played on clay courts. It was the 19th edition of the tournament which was part of the 2015 ATP Challenger Tour. It took place in Samarkand, Uzbekistan between 11 and 16 May 2015.

== Singles main-draw entrants ==
=== Seeds ===
| Country | Player | Rank^{1} | Seed |
|---|---|---|---|
| RUS | Teymuraz Gabashvili | 93 | 1 |
| UZB | Farrukh Dustov | 106 | 2 |
| ESP | Adrián Menéndez Maceiras | 121 | 3 |
| RUS | Aslan Karatsev | 166 | 4 |
| BRA | Guilherme Clezar | 175 | 5 |
| GBR | Liam Broady | 178 | 6 |
| IND | Yuki Bhambri | 186 | 7 |
| GBR | Brydan Klein | 207 | 8 |

- ^{1} Rankings are as of May 4, 2015.

=== Other entrants ===
The following players received wildcards into the singles main draw:

- (Uzbekistan) Sanjar Fayziev
- (Uzbekistan) Temur Ismailov
- (Uzbekistan) Jurabek Karimov
- (Uzbekistan) Shonigmatjon Shofayziyev

The following players received entry from the qualifying draw:

- (United Kingdom) Luke Bambridge
- (Russia) Mikhail Elgin
- (Russia) Ivan Gakhov
- (India) Divij Sharan

The following player received entry as a lucky loser:

- (Italy) Riccardo Ghedin

== Doubles main-draw entrants ==
=== Seeds ===
| Country | Player | Country | Player | Rank^{1} | Seed |
|---|---|---|---|---|---|
| IND | Saketh Myneni | IND | Divij Sharan | 311 | 1 |
| BLR | Sergey Betov | RUS | Mikhail Elgin | 316 | 2 |
| BLR | Aliaksandr Bury | RUS | Anton Zaitcev | 390 | 3 |
| BLR | Yaraslav Shyla | BLR | Andrei Vasilevski | 464 | 4 |

- ^{1} Rankings are as of May 4, 2015.

=== Other entrants ===
The following pairs received wildcards into the doubles main draw:

- (Uzbekistan) Sanjar Fayziev / (Uzbekistan) Jurabek Karimov
- (Uzbekistan) Temur Ismailov / (Uzbekistan) Shonigmatjon Shofayziyev
- (Uzbekistan) Batyr Sapaev / (Uzbekistan) Khumoun Sultanov

== Champions ==
=== Singles ===
- (Russia) Teymuraz Gabashvili def. (India) Yuki Bhambri, 6–3, 6–1

=== Doubles ===
- (Belarus) Sergey Betov / (Russia) Michail Elgin def. (Serbia) Laslo Djere / (Serbia) Peđa Krstin, 6–4, 6–3
