= 2016 Samarkand Challenger =

- Date: 9–14 May
- Edition: 20th
- Draw: 32S / 16D
- Prize money: $50,000
- Surface: Clay
- Location: Samarkand, Uzbekistan

Champions

Singles
- (Russia) Karen Khachanov

Doubles
- (Russia) Denis Matsukevich / (Belarus) Andrei Vasilevski
← 2015 ·	Samarkand Challenger	· 2017 →

The 2016 Samarkand Challenger was a professional tennis tournament played on clay courts. It was the 20th edition of the tournament which was part of the 2016 ATP Challenger Tour. It took place in Samarkand, Uzbekistan between 9 and 14 May 2016.

== Singles main-draw entrants ==
=== Seeds ===
Country	Player	Rank^{1}	Seed
RUS	Karen Khachanov	125	1
MDA	Radu Albot	143	2
ISR	Amir Weintraub	192	3
ESP	Jordi Samper-Montaña	216	4
UZB	Farrukh Dustov	220	5
KAZ	Dmitry Popko	225	6
SRB	Nikola Milojević	233	7
ESP	Enrique López Pérez	235	8

- ^{1} Rankings are as of May 2, 2016.

=== Other entrants ===
The following players received wildcards into the singles main draw:

- (Uzbekistan) Sanjar Fayziev
- (Uzbekistan) Temur Ismailov
- (Uzbekistan) Shonigmatjon Shofayziyev
- (Uzbekistan) Pavel Tsoy

The following players received entry from the qualifying draw:

- (Israel) Bar Tzuf Botzer
- (Russia) Mikhail Elgin
- (Russia) Markos Kalovelonis
- (Italy) Francesco Vilardo

== Champions ==
=== Singles ===
- (Russia) Karen Khachanov def. (Spain) Rubén Ramírez Hidalgo, 6–1, 6–7^{(6–8)}, 6–1

=== Doubles ===
- (Russia) Denis Matsukevich / (Belarus) Andrei Vasilevski def. (Chinese Taipei) Hsieh Cheng-peng / (Chinese Taipei) Yang Tsung-hua, 6–4, 5–7, [10–5]
