= 2019 Samarkand Challenger =

- Date: 13–19 May
- Edition: 23rd
- Draw: 48S / 16D
- Surface: Clay
- Location: Samarkand, Uzbekistan

Champions

Singles
- (Brazil) João Menezes

Doubles
- (Portugal) Gonçalo Oliveira / (Belarus) Andrei Vasilevski
- Samarkand Challenger

The 2019 Samarkand Challenger was a professional tennis tournament played on clay courts. It was the 23rd edition of the tournament which was part of the 2019 ATP Challenger Tour. It took place in Samarkand, Uzbekistan between 13 and 19 May 2019.

== Singles main-draw entrants ==
=== Seeds ===
Country	Player	Rank^{1}	Seed
FRA	Corentin Moutet	122	1
BLR	Egor Gerasimov	132	2
SVK	Andrej Martin	206	3
KAZ	Aleksandr Nedovyesov	209	4
AUT	Lucas Miedler	233	5
BLR	Uladzimir Ignatik	244	6
POR	Gonçalo Oliveira	259	7
BRA	Guilherme Clezar	273	8
DOM	José Hernández-Fernández	288	9
USA	Ulises Blanch	290	10
RUS	Roman Safiullin	293	11
ESP	Roberto Ortega Olmedo	295	12
RUS	Pavel Kotov	301	13
DOM	Roberto Cid Subervi	302	14
IND	Sumit Nagal	303	15
ESA	Marcelo Arévalo	309	16

- ^{1} Rankings are as of May 6, 2019.

=== Other entrants ===
The following players received wildcards into the singles main draw:

- (Uzbekistan) Sergey Fomin
- (Kazakhstan) Andrey Golubev
- (Uzbekistan) Temur Ismailov
- (Uzbekistan) Olimjon Nabiev
- (Kazakhstan) Dmitry Popko

The following players received entry into the singles main draw using their ITF World Tennis Ranking:

- (Uzbekistan) Sanjar Fayziev
- (Egypt) Karim-Mohamed Maamoun
- (Finland) Emil Ruusuvuori
- (Germany) Peter Torebko
- (Russia) Alexander Zhurbin

The following player received entry into the singles main draw as an alternate:

- (Italy) Fabrizio Ornago

The following players received entry from the qualifying draw:

- (Ukraine) Vladyslav Manafov
- (Russia) Evgenii Tiurnev

== Champions ==
=== Singles ===
- (Brazil) João Menezes def. (France) Corentin Moutet 7–6^{(7–2)}, 7–6^{(9–7)}.

=== Doubles ===
- (Portugal) Gonçalo Oliveira / (Belarus) Andrei Vasilevski def. (Uzbekistan) Sergey Fomin / (Russia) Teymuraz Gabashvili 3–6, 6–3, [10–4].
