= 2012 Samarkand Challenger =

- Date: 6 – 12 August
- Edition: 16th
- Location: Samarkand, Uzbekistan

Champions

Singles
- (Serbia) Dušan Lajović

Doubles
- (Ukraine) Oleksandr Nedovyesov / (Ukraine) Ivan Sergeyev
- Samarkand Challenger

The 2012 Samarkand Challenger was a professional tennis tournament played on clay courts. It was the 16th edition of the tournament which was part of the 2012 ATP Challenger Tour. It took place in Samarkand, Uzbekistan between 6 and 12 August 2012.

== Singles main draw entrants ==
=== Seeds ===
Country	Player	Rank^{1}	Seed
RUS	Igor Kunitsyn	143	1
KAZ	Andrey Golubev	157	2
SRB	Dušan Lajović	169	3
SVK	Kamil Čapkovič	220	4
UZB	Farrukh Dustov	235	5
UKR	Ivan Sergeyev	237	6
AUS	Brydan Klein	241	7
SVK	Andrej Martin	260	8

- ^{1} Rankings are as of August 1, 2012.

=== Other entrants ===
The following players received wildcards into the singles main draw:

- (Uzbekistan) Sarvar Ikramov
- (Uzbekistan) Temur Ismailov
- (Uzbekistan) Sergey Shipilov
- (Uzbekistan) Vaja Uzakov

The following players received entry from the qualifying draw:

- (India) N.Sriram Balaji
- (Germany) Jaan-Frederik Brunken
- (Slovakia) Adrian Sikora
- (Belarus) Dzmitry Zhyrmont

== Champions ==
=== Singles ===
- (Serbia) Dušan Lajović def. (Uzbekistan) Farrukh Dustov, 6–3, 6–2

=== Doubles ===
- (Ukraine) Oleksandr Nedovyesov / (Ukraine) Ivan Sergeyev def. (India) Divij Sharan / (India) Vishnu Vardhan, 6–4, 7–6^{(7–1)}
