= Aldin Šetkić =

Bosnian tennis player

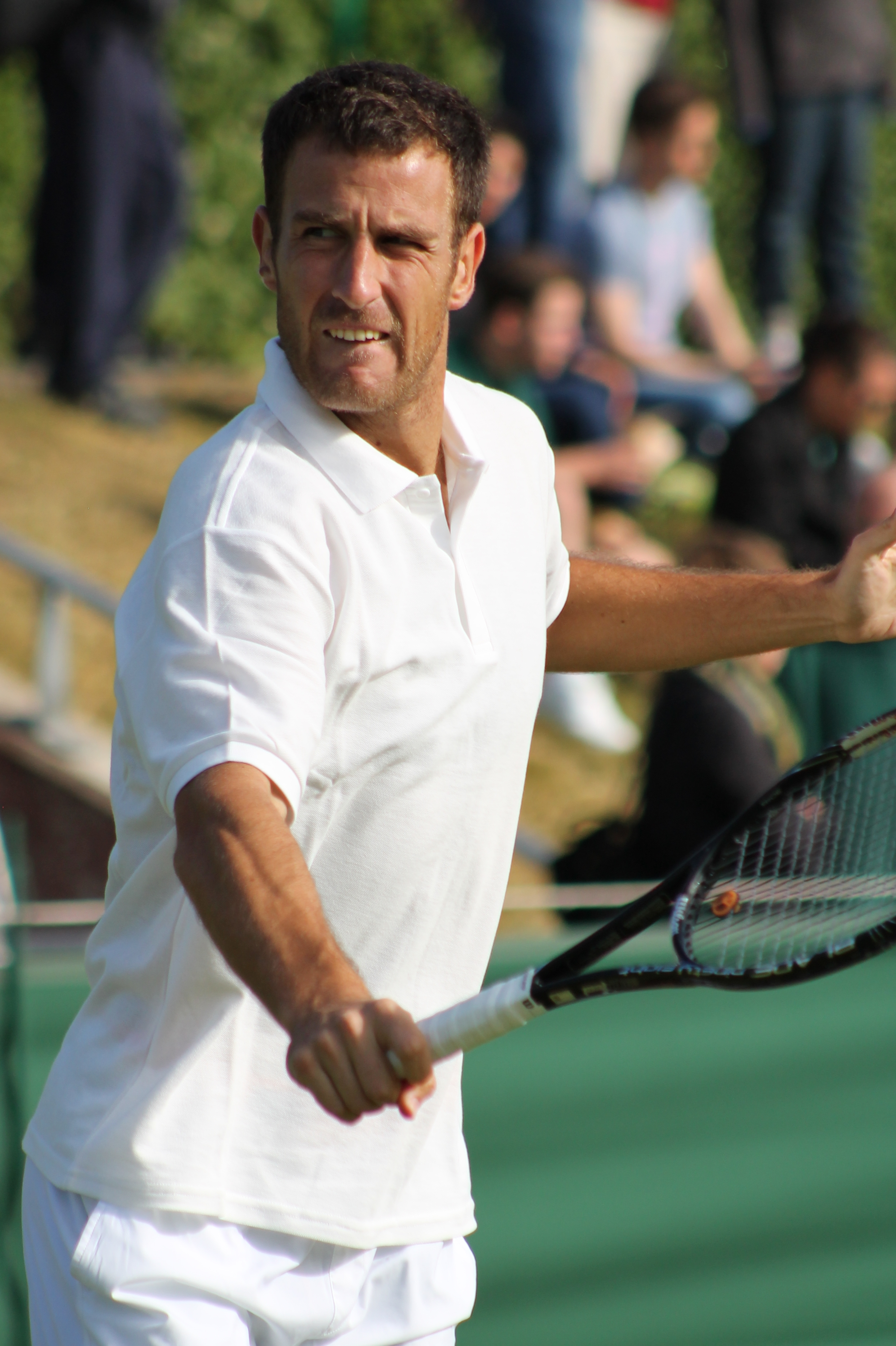
- Šetkić at the 2015 Wimbledon Championships
- Country (sports): Bosnia and Herzegovina
- Born: 21 December 1987 (age 38) Sarajevo, SR Bosnia-Herzegovina, SFR Yugoslavia
- Height: 1.91 m (6 ft 3 in)
- Turned pro: 2004
- Plays: Right-handed (two-handed backhand)
- Coach: Daniel Meyers
- Prize money: $497,728

Singles
- Career record: 8–7
- Career titles: 0
- Highest ranking: No. 165 (16 October 2017)

Grand Slam singles results
- Australian Open: Q2 (2016)
- French Open: Q1 (2013, 2015, 2016, 2017)
- Wimbledon: Q2 (2016)
- US Open: Q2 (2013, 2017)

Doubles
- Career record: 0–4
- Career titles: 0
- Highest ranking: No. 296 (3 November 2014)
- Last updated on: 11 January 2026.

Aldin Šetkić (born 21 December 1987) is a Bosnian professional tennis player. He reached a career-high singles ranking of No. 165 on 16 October 2017.

== ATP Challenger and ITF World Tennis Tour finals ==
=== Singles: 57 (28–29) ===
| Legend ATP Challenger (0–1) ITF World Tennis Tour (28–28) | Finals by surface Hard (16–17) Clay (11–11) Grass (0–0) Carpet (1–1) |

| Result | W–L | Date | Tournament | Tier | Surface | Opponent | Score |
|---|---|---|---|---|---|---|---|
| Loss | 0–1 | May 2007 | Bosnia and Herzegovina F1, Doboj | Futures | Clay | (Latvia) Deniss Pavlovs | 4–6, 3–6 |
| Loss | 0–2 | Jun 2008 | Bosnia and Herzegovina F4, Prijedor | Futures | Clay | (Bosnia and Herzegovina) Siniša Marković | 2–6, 3–6 |
| Loss | 0–3 | Mar 2009 | Portugal F1, Faro | Futures | Hard | (Czech Republic) Dušan Lojda | 2–6, 6–2, 3–6 |
| Win | 1–3 | May 2009 | Bosnia and Herzegovina F2, Sarajevo | Futures | Clay | (France) Guillaume Rufin | 7–5, 6–2 |
| Loss | 1–4 | Jun 2009 | Serbia F3, Belgrade | Futures | Clay | (Montenegro) Goran Tošić | 6–1, 3–6, 5–7 |
| Loss | 1–5 | Sep 2009 | Croatia F8, Osijek | Futures | Clay | (Croatia) Nikola Mektić | 6–2, 4–6, 2–6 |
| Loss | 1–6 | Nov 2009 | Turkey F13, Antalya | Futures | Clay | (Slovenia) Aljaž Bedene | 2–6, 1–6 |
| Loss | 1–7 | Feb 2010 | Bosnia and Herzegovina F1, Sarajevo | Futures | Carpet (i) | (Poland) Dawid Olejniczak | 4–6, 5–7 |
| Loss | 1–8 | Apr 2010 | Turkey F6, Antalya | Futures | Clay | (Austria) Marco Mirnegg | 3–6, 2–6 |
| Win | 2–8 | Jul 2010 | Serbia F3, Belgrade | Futures | Clay | (Serbia) Vladimir Obradović | 6–3, 3–6, 6–3 |
| Loss | 2–9 | Aug 2010 | Serbia F4, Novi Sad | Futures | Clay | (Serbia) Dušan Lajović | 0–6, 6–4, 3–6 |
| Win | 3–9 | Aug 2010 | Serbia F5, Novi Sad | Futures | Clay | (Serbia) Marko Djokovic | 6–1, 6–1 |
| Loss | 3–10 | Nov 2010 | Sudan F1, Khartoum | Futures | Hard | (Slovakia) Ivo Klec | 2–6, 2–6 |
| Loss | 3–11 | Dec 2010 | Sudan F2, Khartoum | Futures | Hard | (Slovakia) Ivo Klec | 3–6, 5–7 |
| Loss | 3–12 | May 2011 | Bosnia and Herzegovina F3, Brčko | Futures | Clay | (Bosnia and Herzegovina) Damir Džumhur | 3–6, 7–5, 5–7 |
| Loss | 3–13 | Jun 2011 | Bosnia and Herzegovina F5, Kiseljak | Futures | Clay | (Slovakia) Jozef Kovalík | 3–6, 4–6 |
| Loss | 3–14 | Dec 2011 | Turkey F33, Antalya | Futures | Hard | (France) Ludovic Walter | 2–6, 4–6 |
| Win | 4–14 | Jan 2012 | Turkey F2, Antalya | Futures | Hard | (Croatia) Toni Androić | 6–2, 6–2 |
| Win | 5–14 | May 2012 | Bosnia and Herzegovina F2, Sarajevo | Futures | Clay | (Serbia) Ivan Bjelica | 6–3, ret. |
| Win | 6–14 | Jul 2012 | Serbia F6, Kikinda | Futures | Clay | (Hungary) Viktor Filipenkó | 6–1, 6–2 |
| Win | 7–14 | Aug 2012 | Serbia F7, Sombor | Futures | Clay | (Serbia) Ivan Bjelica | 6–2, 6–1 |
| Loss | 7–15 | Sep 2012 | Croatia F9, Osijek | Futures | Clay | (Serbia) Ivan Bjelica | 3–6, 2–6 |
| Win | 8–15 | Sep 2012 | Serbia F11, Novi Sad | Futures | Clay | (Serbia) Denis Bejtulahi | 6–4, 6–0 |
| Win | 9–15 | Nov 2012 | Turkey F43, Antalya | Futures | Hard | (Ukraine) Artem Smirnov | 1–6, 6–2, 6–1 |
| Win | 10–15 | Nov 2012 | Turkey F45, Antalya | Futures | Hard | (Belgium) Arthur De Greef | 6–2, 1–0, ret. |
| Win | 11–15 | Jun 2013 | Bosnia and Herzegovina F1, Prijedor | Futures | Clay | (Serbia) Peđa Krstin | 7–6^{(7–4)}, 6–0 |
| Loss | 11–16 | Dec 2013 | Senegal F2, Dakar | Futures | Hard | (Austria) Maximilian Neuchrist | 6–4, 6–7^{(5–7)}, 2–6 |
| Win | 12–16 | Dec 2013 | Turkey F50, Antalya | Futures | Hard | (France) Julien Obry | 6–3, 7–5 |
| Loss | 12–17 | Mar 2014 | Turkey F5, Antalya | Futures | Hard | (Bosnia and Herzegovina) Tomislav Brkić | 2–6, 6–3, 5–7 |
| Win | 13–17 | Mar 2014 | Turkey F6, Antalya | Futures | Hard | (Belgium) Kimmer Coppejans | 6–3, 6–2 |
| Win | 14–17 | Jul 2014 | Turkey F22, Istanbul | Futures | Hard | (Turkey) Barış Ergüden | 6–3, 4–6, 6–1 |
| Loss | 14–18 | Jul 2014 | Turkey F23, Istanbul | Futures | Hard | (France) Hugo Nys | 4–6, 3–6 |
| Win | 15–18 | Jul 2014 | Turkey F25, Istanbul | Futures | Hard | (South Africa) Nicolaas Scholtz | 6–2, 6–3 |
| Win | 16–18 | Oct 2014 | Egypt F27, Sharm El Sheikh | Futures | Hard | (Belgium) Clement Geens | 6–2, 6–2 |
| Win | 17–18 | Oct 2014 | Egypt F28, Sharm El Sheikh | Futures | Hard | (Italy) Alessandro Bega | 6–1, 6–4 |
| Loss | 17–19 | Dec 2014 | Senegal F2, Dakar | Futures | Hard | (Serbia) Laslo Djere | 5–7, 6–2, 4–6 |
| Loss | 17–20 | Dec 2014 | Turkey F46, Istanbul | Futures | Hard | (Serbia) Miki Janković | 6–1, 7–6^{(7–1)} |
| Win | 18–20 | Jul 2015 | Turkey F29, Ankara | Futures | Clay | (Italy) Daniele Capecchi | 6–3, 4–6, 7–5 |
| Win | 19–20 | Nov 2015 | Germany F18, Ismaning | Futures | Carpet (i) | (Germany) Johannes Härteis | 6–7^{(2–7)}, 7–6^{(8–6)}, 6–3 |
| Loss | 19–21 | Nov 2015 | Egypt F40, Sharm El Sheikh | Futures | Hard | (Ukraine) Denys Molchanov | 6–4, 4–6, 6–2 |
| Win | 20–21 | Nov 2015 | Egypt F41, Sharm El Sheikh | Futures | Hard | (Ukraine) Denys Molchanov | 6–2, 6–3 |
| Win | 21–21 | Dec 2015 | Nigeria F3, Lagos | Futures | Hard | (France) Sadio Doumbia | 6–2, 6–0 |
| Loss | 21–22 | May 2016 | Nigeria F2, Abuja | Futures | Hard | (Egypt) Mohamed Safwat | 4–6, 2–4, ret. |
| Win | 22–22 | Jul 2016 | Egypt F13, Sharm El Sheikh | Futures | Hard | (Italy) Alessandro Bega | 7–5, 6–4 |
| Win | 23–22 | Jul 2016 | Egypt F14, Sharm El Sheikh | Futures | Hard | (Czech Republic) Tomáš Papik | 6–4, 6–2 |
| Win | 24–22 | Jan 2017 | Egypt F1, Sharm El Sheikh | Futures | Hard | (Egypt) Karim-Mohamed Maamoun | 6–3, 7–5 |
| Loss | 24–23 | Feb 2017 | Egypt F3, Sharm El Sheikh | Futures | Hard | (Egypt) Karim-Mohamed Maamoun | 2–6, 6–7^{(1–7)} |
| Win | 25–23 | Mar 2017 | Egypt F8, Sharm El Sheikh | Futures | Hard | (France) Ugo Humbert | 6–3, 6–4 |
| Loss | 25–24 | Mar 2017 | Egypt F9, Sharm El Sheikh | Futures | Hard | (South Africa) Nicolaas Scholtz | 6–7^{(5–7)}, 3–6 |
| Loss | 25–25 | Apr 2017 | Egypt F12, Sharm El Sheikh | Futures | Hard | (Canada) Filip Peliwo | 6–2, 3–6, 3–6 |
| Win | 26–25 | Apr 2017 | Egypt F13, Sharm El Sheikh | Futures | Hard | (France) Gleb Sakharov | 3–6, 6–2, 6–0 |
| Loss | 26–26 | May 2017 | Samarkand, Uzbekistan | Challenger | Clay | (Spain) Adrián Menéndez Maceiras | 4–6, 2–6 |
| Loss | 26–27 | Mar 2018 | Egypt F7, Sharm El Sheikh | Futures | Hard | (South Africa) Lloyd Harris | 4–6, 6–4, 4–6 |
| Loss | 26–28 | Oct 2019 | M25 Lagos, Nigeria | WTT | Hard | (France) Calvin Hemery | 1–6, 2–6 |
| Loss | 26–29 | Oct 2019 | M25 Lagos, Nigeria | WTT | Hard | (France) Calvin Hemery | 2–4, ret. |
| Win | 27–29 | Apr 2021 | M15 Šibenik, Croatia | WTT | Clay | (Austria) David Pichler | 7–6^{(7–2)}, 6–3 |
| Win | 28–29 | May 2021 | M15 Prijedor, Bosnia and Herzegovina | WTT | Clay | (Bosnia and Herzegovina) Nerman Fatić | 6–3, 4–6, 6–2 |

=== Doubles: 36 (20–16) ===
| Legend ATP Challenger (0–1) ITF World Tennis Tour (20–15) | Finals by surface Hard (10–4) Clay (10–12) Grass (0–0) |

| Result | W–L | Date | Tournament | Tier | Surface | Partner | Opponents | Score |
|---|---|---|---|---|---|---|---|---|
| Loss | 0–1 | Jun 2005 | Serbia and Montenegro F3, Belgrade | Futures | Clay | (Serbia and Montenegro) Borislav Borović | (Slovakia) Karol Galik (Slovakia) Henrik Kula | 1–6, 3–6 |
| Win | 1–1 | Aug 2005 | Croatia F5, Zagreb | Futures | Clay | (Bosnia and Herzegovina) Zlatan Kadrić | (Croatia) Ivan Cinkuš (Croatia) Adnan Mešić | 6–3, 7–5 |
| Loss | 1–2 | Jun 2007 | Serbia F1, Belgrade | Futures | Clay | (Serbia) Ivan Đurđević | (Spain) Mariano Albert-Ferrando (Spain) Guillermo Olaso | 4–6, 4–6 |
| Loss | 1–3 | Aug 2007 | Serbia F3, Sombor | Futures | Clay | (Bosnia and Herzegovina) Aleksandar Marić | (Serbia) David Savić (Serbia) Dusan Mihailovic | 4–6, 4–6 |
| Loss | 1–4 | Apr 2008 | Turkey F4, Antalya | Futures | Clay | (Montenegro) Goran Tošić | (Egypt) Karim Maamoun (Egypt) Sherif Sabry | 1–6, 0–6 |
| Loss | 1–5 | Mar 2009 | Portugal F2, Lagos | Futures | Clay | (Serbia) Aleksandar Slović | (Brazil) Marcelo Demoliner (Brazil) Rodrigo Guidolin | 1–6, 6–4, [10–12] |
| Win | 2–5 | Mar 2009 | Portugal F3, Albufeira | Futures | Clay | (Serbia) Aleksandar Slović | (Brazil) Marcelo Demoliner (Brazil) Rodrigo Guidolin | 6–2, 6–4 |
| Win | 3–5 | May 2009 | Bosnia and Herzegovina F2, Sarajevo | Futures | Clay | (Serbia) Aleksandar Slović | (Serbia) Ivan Đurđević (Serbia) Ilija Vučić | 6–4, 6–3 |
| Loss | 3–6 | May 2009 | Bosnia and Herzegovina F3, Brčko | Futures | Clay | (Serbia) Aleksandar Slović | (Serbia) Ivan Bjelica (Serbia) Aleksandar Cvetkov | 6–3, 6–7^{(5–7)}, [6–10] |
| Win | 4–6 | Aug 2009 | Serbia F7, Kruševac | Futures | Clay | (Serbia) Aleksandar Slović | (Serbia) Aleksandar Cvetkov (Serbia) Ilija Vučić | 6–3, 6–1 |
| Loss | 4–7 | Oct 2009 | Bosnia and Herzegovina F6, Mostar | Futures | Clay | (Serbia) Aleksandar Slović | (Croatia) Marin Draganja (Croatia) Dino Marcan | 1–6, 2–6 |
| Loss | 4–8 | Oct 2009 | Croatia F10, Dubrovnik | Futures | Clay | (Bosnia and Herzegovina) Ismar Gorčić | (Croatia) Marin Draganja (Croatia) Dino Marcan | 4–6, 6–2, [11–13] |
| Loss | 4–9 | Nov 2010 | Sudan F1, Khartoum | Futures | Clay | (Serbia) David Savić | (Spain) Jordi Muñoz Abreu (Russia) Ivan Nedelko | 6–2, 4–6, [9–11] |
| Win | 5–9 | Dec 2010 | Sudan F2, Khartoum | Futures | Clay | (Serbia) David Savić | (Austria) Richard Ruckelshausen (Austria) Bertram Steinberger | 6–2, 6–4 |
| Win | 6–9 | Jun 2011 | Serbia F2, Belgrade | Futures | Clay | (Bosnia and Herzegovina) Damir Džumhur | (Serbia) Nikola Ćaćić (Montenegro) Goran Tošić | 2–6, 7–6^{(7–4)}, [10–6] |
| Win | 7–9 | Nov 2011 | Turkey F32, Antalya | Futures | Hard | (Bosnia and Herzegovina) Damir Džumhur | (Serbia) Ivan Bjelica (Bosnia and Herzegovina) Tomislav Brkić | 6–4, 6–3 |
| Loss | 7–10 | Dec 2011 | Turkey F33, Antalya | Futures | Hard | (Bosnia and Herzegovina) Damir Džumhur | (Belgium) Joris De Loore (United Kingdom) Oliver Golding | 3–6, 6–7^{(5–7)} |
| Win | 8–10 | Jan 2012 | Turkey F1, Antalya | Futures | Hard | (Bosnia and Herzegovina) Tomislav Brkić | (Sweden) Carl Bergman (Sweden) Patrik Brydolf | 3–6, 7–6^{(7–2)}, [10–8] |
| Win | 9–10 | Feb 2012 | Turkey F4, Antalya | Futures | Hard | (Bosnia and Herzegovina) Damir Džumhur | (Kuwait) Abdullah Maqdes (South Africa) Ruan Roelofse | 6–4, 4–6, [10–5] |
| Loss | 9–11 | May 2012 | Bosnia and Herzegovina F3, Brčko | Futures | Clay | (Slovakia) Filip Horanský | (Croatia) Ante Pavić (Croatia) Nikola Mektić | 1–6, 3–6 |
| Win | 10–11 | Jul 2012 | Serbia F4, Belgrade | Futures | Clay | (Bosnia and Herzegovina) Ismar Gorčić | (Serbia) Ivan Bjelica (Croatia) Matej Sabanov | 4–6, 6–2, [10–4] |
| Win | 11–11 | Aug 2012 | Serbia F7, Sombor | Futures | Clay | (Bosnia and Herzegovina) Ismar Gorčić | (Serbia) Ivan Bjelica (Croatia) Matej Sabanov | 6–2, 7–6^{(7–1)} |
| Loss | 11–12 | Aug 2012 | Croatia F8, Vinkovci | Futures | Clay | (Bosnia and Herzegovina) Tomislav Brkić | (Croatia) Mislav Hižak (Slovenia) Blaž Rola | 4–6, 6–7^{(3–7)} |
| Win | 12–12 | Sep 2012 | Croatia F9, Osijek | Futures | Clay | (Bosnia and Herzegovina) Tomislav Brkić | (Serbia) Ivan Bjelica (Croatia) Matej Sabanov | 6–4, 6–1 |
| Win | 13–12 | Sep 2012 | Serbia F14, Sokobanja | Futures | Clay | (Serbia) Ivan Bjelica | (North Macedonia) Shendrit Deari (North Macedonia) Tomislav Jotovski | 6–2, 6–0 |
| Win | 14–12 | Dec 2013 | Senegal F1, Dakar | Futures | Hard | (Austria) Maximilian Neuchrist | (Italy) Francesco Garzelli (Venezuela) Jordi Muñoz Abreu | 6–1, 6–4 |
| Win | 15–12 | Dec 2013 | Turkey F50, Antalya | Futures | Hard | (Bosnia and Herzegovina) Tomislav Brkić | (Netherlands) Alban Meuffels (Lithuania) Lukas Mugevičius | 6–2, 6–1 |
| Win | 16–12 | Mar 2014 | Turkey F6, Antalya | Futures | Hard | (Italy) Erik Crepaldi | (Bosnia and Herzegovina) Tomislav Brkić (Austria) Bastian Trinker | 6–4, 6–4 |
| Win | 17–12 | Mar 2014 | Greece F3, Heraklion | Futures | Hard | (Slovakia) Jozef Kovalík | (Czech Republic) Lukáš Maršoun (Czech Republic) Dominik Süč | 6–3, 6–4 |
| Loss | 17–13 | Oct 2014 | Egypt F27, Sharm El Sheikh | Futures | Clay | (Czech Republic) Libor Salaba | (Italy) Matteo Marfia (Switzerland) Luca Margaroli | Walkover |
| Loss | 17–14 | Dec 2014 | Senegal F2, Dakar | Futures | Hard | (South Africa) Keith-Patrick Crowley | (United States) William Bushamuka (France) Tom Jomby | 4–6, 4–6 |
| Loss | 17–15 | Feb 2016 | Cherbourg, France | Challenger | Hard (i) | (Japan) Yoshihito Nishioka | (United Kingdom) Ken Skupski (United Kingdom) Neal Skupski | 6–4, 3–6, [6–10] |
| Win | 18–15 | Apr 2017 | Egypt F12, Sharm El Sheikh | Futures | Hard | (Canada) Filip Peliwo | (Ukraine) Vladyslav Manafov (Ukraine) Daniil Zarichanskyy | 4–6, 6–3, [14–12] |
| Win | 19–15 | Feb 2020 | M25 Aktobe, Kazakhstan | WTT | Hard | (South Korea) Chung Yun-seong | (Italy) Riccardo Balzerani (Italy) Francesco Forti | 6–3, 6–4 |
| Win | 20–15 | Nov 2020 | M15 Sharm El Sheikh, Egypt | WTT | Hard | (Belarus) Yaraslav Shyla | (India) Siddhant Banthia (United Kingdom) Aidan McHugh | 7–6^{(7–2)}, 6–3 |
| Loss | 20–16 | Mar 2021 | M15 Sharm El Sheikh, Egypt | WTT | Hard | (Austria) Lucas Miedler | (Italy) Jacopo Berrettini (Italy) Francesco Vilardo | 2–6, 7–6^{(7–1)}, [8–10] |

== Singles performance timeline ==
Key
| W | F | SF | QF | #R | RR | Q# | P# | DNQ | A | Z# | PO | G | S | B | NMS | NTI | P | NH |

(W) winner; (F) finalist; (SF) semifinalist; (QF) quarterfinalist; (#R) rounds 4, 3, 2, 1; (RR) round-robin stage; (Q#) qualification round; (P#) preliminary round; (DNQ) did not qualify; (A) absent; (Z#) Davis/Fed Cup Zonal Group (with number indication) or (PO) play-off; (G) gold, (S) silver or (B) bronze Olympic/Paralympic medal; (NMS) not a Masters tournament; (NTI) not a Tier I tournament; (P) postponed; (NH) not held; (SR) strike rate (events won / competed); (W–L) win–loss record.
To avoid confusion and double counting, these charts are updated at the conclusion of a tournament or when the player's participation has ended.

Current as far as the 2015 US Open.

| Tournament | 2011 | 2012 | 2013 | 2014 | 2015 | W–L |
|---|---|---|---|---|---|---|
Grand Slams
| Australian Open | A | A | Q1 | A | Q1 | 0–0 |
| French Open | A | A | Q1 | A | Q1 | 0–0 |
| Wimbledon | A | A | Q1 | A | Q1 | 0–0 |
| US Open | A | A | Q2 | A | Q1 | 0–0 |
| Win–loss | 0–0 | 0–0 | 0–0 | 0–0 | 0–0 | 0–0 |
