= Vaja Uzakov =

Uzbekistani tennis player

- Country (sports): Uzbekistan
- Born: 4 June 1988 (age 38) Tashkent, Uzbekistan
- Plays: Right-handed (two-handed backhand)
- Prize money: $56,241

Singles
- Career record: 0–6 (at ATP Tour level, Grand Slam level)
- Career titles: 0; 0 Challenger, 0 Futures
- Highest ranking: No. 698 (7 June 2010)

Doubles
- Career record: 0–0 (at ATP Tour level, Grand Slam level)
- Career titles: 0; 0 Challenger, 3 Futures
- Highest ranking: No. 316 (11 August 2008)

Team competitions
- Davis Cup: 0–6
Medal record
Representing Uzbekistan
Men's tennis
Asian Games
Silver medal – second place	2010 Guangzhou	Team
- Last updated on: 13 November 2017.

Vaja Uzakov (born 4 June 1988) is an Uzbek tennis player.

Uzakov has a career high ATP singles ranking of 698 achieved on 7 June 2010. He also has a career high ATP doubles ranking of 316, achieved on 11 August 2008.

Uzakov has represented Uzbekistan at Davis Cup, where he has a win–loss record of 0–6.

He played at the 2010 Asian Games on singles he lost from the late champion Somdev Devvarman at the 3rd round. On mixed doubles with Nigina Abduraimova lost on 1st round. On the men's team event won the silver medal with Farrukh Dustov, Murad Inoyatov and Denis Istomin.

== Future and Challenger finals ==
=== Singles: 1 (0–1) ===
Legend
Challengers 0 (0–0)
Futures 1 (0–1)

Outcome	No.	Date	Tournament	Surface	Opponent	Score
Runner-up	1.	13 September 2009	Volgograd, Russia F8	Hard	(Russia) Evgeny Kirillov	0–6, 0–6

=== Doubles 9 (3–6) ===
Legend
Challengers 4 (0–4)
Futures 5 (3–2)

Outcome	No.	Date	Tournament	Surface	Partner	Opponents	Score
Runner-up	1.	18 August 2007	Bukhara, Uzbekistan	Hard	(Russia) Danila Arsenov	(Russia) Evgeny Kirillov (Russia) Alexander Kudryavtsev	3–6, 1–6
Runner-up	2.	25 May 2008	Fergana, Uzbekistan	Hard	(Russia) Alexandre Krasnoroutskiy	(Russia) Konstantin Kravchuk (Poland) Łukasz Kubot	4–6, 1–6
Runner-up	3.	9 August 2008	Samarkand, Uzbekistan	Clay	(Russia) Danila Arsenov	(Georgia (country)) Irakli Labadze (Russia) Denis Matsukevich	6–7^{(1–7)}, 6–4, [3–10]
Runner-up	4.	26 September 2009	Shymkent, Kazakhstan F3	Clay	(Russia) Victor Kozin	(Russia) Mikhail Fufygin (Russia) Vitali Reshetnikov	4–6, 2–6
Winner	5.	6 May 2011	Taraz, Kazakhstan F2	Hard	(Russia) Mikhail Fufygin	(Russia) Denis Matsukevich (Russia) Stanislav Vovk	7–6^{(7–5)}, 6–4
Winner	6.	29 October 2011	Lagos, Nigeria F4	Hard	(France) Paterne Mamata	(Nigeria) Abdul-Mumin Babalola (Senegal) Daouda Ndiaye	7–5, 3–6, [10–6]
Runner-up	7.	12 November 2011	Antalya, Turkey F31	Hard	(Russia) Alexander Lobkov	(Moldova) Andrei Ciumac (Moldova) Maxim Dubarenco	5–7, 4–6
Winner	8.	14 July 2012	Almaty, Kazakhstan F6	Hard	(Russia) Vitaly Kachanovskiy	(Uzbekistan) Rifat Biktyakov (Kazakhstan) Denis Yevseyev	6–3, 6–4
Runner-up	9.	17 May 2014	Samarkand, Uzbekistan	Clay	(Uzbekistan) Shonigmatjon Shofayziyev	(Belarus) Sergey Betov (Belarus) Aliaksandr Bury	4–6, 3–6

== Davis Cup ==
=== Participations: (0–6) ===
Group membership World Group (0–0) WG Play-off (0–1) Group I (0–5) Group II (0–0) Group III (0–0) Group IV (0–0)	Matches by surface Hard (0–3) Clay (0–3) Grass (0–0) Carpet (0–0)	Matches by type Singles (0–6) Doubles (0–0)

- ▲ ▼ indicates the outcome of the Davis Cup match followed by the score, date, place of event, the zonal classification and its phase, and the court surface.

Rubber outcome	No.	Rubber	Match type (partner if any)	Opponent nation	Opponent player(s)	Score
▼0–5; 6–8 April 2007; Olympic Tennis Court, Seoul, South Korea; Asia/Oceania Second round; Hard surface
Defeat	1	V	Singles	South Korea	An Jae-sung	1–6, 2–6
▲3–2; 11–13 April 2008; Philippine Columbian Association, Manila, Philippines; Asia/Oceania Relegation Play off first round; Clay (indoor) surface
Defeat	2	V	Singles	Philippines	Eric Taino	4–6, 4–6
▲3–2; 8–10 May 2009; Sport Complex Pahlavon, Namangan, Uzbekistan; Asia/Oceania Third round; Clay (indoor) surface
Defeat	3	V	Singles	Japan	Takao Suzuki	6–4, 3–6, 3–6
▼0–5; 18–20 September 2009; Belgrade Arena, Belgrade, Serbia; World Group Play off; Hard (indoor) surface
Defeat	4	V	Singles	Serbia	Ilija Bozoljac	1–6, 4–6
▲3–2; 9–11 July 2010; Gimcheon Total Sports Town Tennis Courts, Gimcheon, South Korea; Asia/Oceania Relegation Play off first round; Hard (indoor) surface
Defeat	5	V	Singles	South Korea	Lim Yong-kyu	3–6, 1–6
▲3–2; 4–6 March 2011; Sport Complex Pahlavon, Namangan, Uzbekistan; Asia/Oceania First round; Clay (indoor) surface
Defeat	6	V	Singles	New Zealand	Michael Venus	3–6, 0–6
