= Samarkand Challenger =

- 2019 Samarkand Challenger

Defunct tennis tournament
- Location: Samarkand, Uzbekistan
- Venue: Tennis Club Dinamo
- Category: ATP Challenger Tour
- Surface: Clay
- Draw: 32S/32Q/16D
- Prize money: $50,000+H
- Website: Website

The Samarkand Challenger was a tennis tournament held in Samarkand, Uzbekistan from 1996 until 2019. The event was part of the ATP Challenger Tour and was played on outdoor clay courts.

== Singles ==
| Year | Champion | Runner-up | Score |
|---|---|---|---|
| 2019 | (Brazil) João Menezes | (France) Corentin Moutet | 7–6^{(7–2)}, 7–6^{(9–7)} |
| 2018 | (Italy) Luca Vanni | (Spain) Mario Vilella Martínez | 6–4, 6–4 |
| 2017 | (Spain) Adrián Menéndez Maceiras | (Bosnia and Herzegovina) Aldin Šetkić | 6–4, 6–2 |
| 2016 | (Russia) Karen Khachanov | (Spain) Rubén Ramírez Hidalgo | 6–1, 6–7^{(6–8)}, 6–1 |
| 2015 | (Russia) Teymuraz Gabashvili | (India) Yuki Bhambri | 6–3, 6–1 |
| 2014 | (Uzbekistan) Farrukh Dustov | (Russia) Aslan Karatsev | 7–6^{(7–4)}, 6–1 |
| 2013 | (Russia) Teymuraz Gabashvili | (Ukraine) Oleksandr Nedovyesov | 6–3, 6–4 |
| 2012 | (Serbia) Dušan Lajović | (Uzbekistan) Farrukh Dustov | 6–3, 6–2 |
| 2011 | (Uzbekistan) Denis Istomin | (Tunisia) Malek Jaziri | 7–6(2) ret. |
| 2010 | (Slovakia) Andrej Martin | (Slovakia) Marek Semjan | 6–4, 7–5 |
| 2009 | (Jamaica) Dustin Brown | (France) Jonathan Dasnières de Veigy | 7–6(3), 6–3 |
| 2008 | (Russia) Mikhail Elgin | (Brazil) André Ghem | 7–6, 6–3 |
| 2007 | (Russia) Mikhail Kukushkin | (Italy) Manuel Jorquera | 6–4, 6–3 |
| 2006 | (Serbia) Janko Tipsarević | (France) Édouard Roger-Vasselin | 6–3, 6–2 |
| 2005 | (Serbia and Montenegro) Boris Pašanski | (Greece) Vasilis Mazarakis | 6–3, 6–2 |
| 2004 | (Argentina) Mariano Puerta | (Czech Republic) Pavel Šnobel | 6–1, 6–2 |
| 2003 | (Austria) Daniel Köllerer | (Russia) Andrei Stoliarov | 6–2, 6–2 |
| 2002 | (Greece) Vasilis Mazarakis | (Netherlands) John Van Lottum | 7–6, 4–6, 6–1 |
| 2001 | (Uzbekistan) Oleg Ogorodov | (Uzbekistan) Vadim Kutsenko | 6–3, 6–4 |
| 2000 | (Russia) Mikhail Youzhny | (Norway) Jan Frode Andersen | 7–6, 2–6, 7–6 |
| 1999 | (Uzbekistan) Oleg Ogorodov | (Spain) Emilio Benfele Álvarez | 1–6, 7–6, 7–6 |
| 1998 | (Sweden) Fredrik Jonsson | (Uzbekistan) Oleg Ogorodov | 7–6, 6–3 |
| 1997 | Tournament not held | | |
| 1996 | (Spain) Juan Antonio Marín | (Netherlands) Sander Groen | 6–2, 6–4 |

== Doubles ==
| Year | Champion | Runner-up | Score |
|---|---|---|---|
| 2019 | (Portugal) Gonçalo Oliveira (Belarus) Andrei Vasilevski | (Uzbekistan) Sergey Fomin (Russia) Teymuraz Gabashvili | 3–6, 6–3, [10–4] |
| 2018 | (India) Sriram Balaji (India) Vishnu Vardhan | (Russia) Mikhail Elgin (Uzbekistan) Denis Istomin | Walkover |
| 2017 | (Lithuania) Laurynas Grigelis (Czech Republic) Zdeněk Kolář | (India) Prajnesh Gunneswaran (India) Vishnu Vardhan | 7–6^{(7–2)}, 6–3 |
| 2016 | (Russia) Denis Matsukevich (Belarus) Andrei Vasilevski | (Chinese Taipei) Hsieh Cheng-peng (Chinese Taipei) Yang Tsung-hua | 6–4, 5–7, [10–5] |
| 2015 | (Belarus) Sergey Betov (Russia) Mikhail Elgin | (Serbia) Laslo Djere (Serbia) Peđa Krstin | 6–4, 6–3 |
| 2014 | (Belarus) Sergey Betov (Belarus) Aliaksandr Bury | (Uzbekistan) Shonigmatjon Shofayziyev (Uzbekistan) Vaja Uzakov | 6–4, 6–3 |
| 2013 | (Uzbekistan) Farrukh Dustov (Ukraine) Oleksandr Nedovyesov | (Moldova) Radu Albot (Australia) Jordan Kerr | 6–1, 7–6^{(9–7)} |
| 2012 | (Ukraine) Oleksandr Nedovyesov (Ukraine) Ivan Sergeyev | (India) Divij Sharan (India) Vishnu Vardhan | 6–4, 7–6^{(7–1)} |
| 2011 | (Russia) Mikhail Elgin (Russia) Alexander Kudryavtsev | (Moldova) Radu Albot (Russia) Andrey Kuznetsov | 7–6^{(7–4)}, 2–6, [10–7] |
| 2010 | (Latvia) Andis Juška (Latvia) Deniss Pavlovs | (Chinese Taipei) Lee Hsin-han (Chinese Taipei) Yang Tsung-hua | 7–5, 6–3 |
| 2009 | (Australia) Kaden Hensel (Australia) Adam Hubble | (Russia) Valery Rudnev (Ukraine) Ivan Sergeyev | 7–5, 7–5 |
| 2008 | (Georgia (country)) Irakli Labadze (Russia) Denis Matsukevich | (Russia) Danila Arsenov (Uzbekistan) Vaja Uzakov | 7–6, 4–6, [10–3] |
| 2007 | (Ukraine) Sergei Bubka (Russia) Evgeny Kirillov | (Czech Republic) Jaroslav Pospíšil (Czech Republic) Adam Vejmělka | 6–3, 6–2 |
| 2006 | (Japan) Satoshi Iwabuchi (Japan) Gouichi Motomura | (South Korea) Jun Woong-sun (Germany) Frank Moser | 2–6, 6–2, [10–5] |
| 2005 | (Croatia) Ivan Cerović (Serbia and Montenegro) Petar Popović | (Kazakhstan) Alexey Kedryuk (Ukraine) Orest Tereshchuk | 6–3, 6–0 |
| 2004 | (France) Jean-François Bachelot (Netherlands) Melle van Gemerden | (Germany) Sebastian Fitz (Romania) Florin Mergea | 6–2, 3–6, 6–1 |
| 2003 | (Slovakia) Viktor Bruthans (Ukraine) Sergiy Stakhovsky | (Russia) Pavel Ivanov (Serbia and Montenegro) Darko Mađarovski | 6–2, 6–4 |
| 2002 | (Argentina) Federico Browne (Netherlands) Rogier Wassen | (Uzbekistan) Vadim Kutsenko (Uzbekistan) Oleg Ogorodov | 3–6, 7–6, 7–6 |
| 2001 | (Russia) Denis Golovanov (Uzbekistan) Vadim Kutsenko | (Uzbekistan) Oleg Ogorodov (Uzbekistan) Dmitri Tomashevich | 6–1, 4–6, 6–4 |
| 2000 | (Italy) Stefano Galvani (Russia) Andrei Stoliarov | (Brazil) Daniel Melo (Brazil) Alexandre Simoni | walkover |
| 1999 | (Israel) Noam Behr (Russia) Andrei Stoliarov | (Spain) Emilio Benfele Álvarez (Belgium) Kris Goossens | 6–7, 6–3, 6–1 |
| 1998 | (Israel) Noam Behr (Israel) Eyal Ran | (Russia) Andrey Merinov (Russia) Andrei Stoliarov | 1–6, 6–4, 7–6 |
| 1997 | Tournament not held | | |
| 1996 | (Puerto Rico) José Frontera (Uzbekistan) Oleg Ogorodov | (Slovakia) Martin Hromec (Netherlands) Rogier Wassen | 6–3, 6–4 |
