= 2016 Gimcheon Open ATP Challenger – Singles =

Singles
- 2016 Gimcheon Open ATP Challenger

Final
- Champion: (Australia) Max Purcell
- Runner-up: (Australia) Andrew Whittington
- Score: 3–6, 7–6^{(8–6)}, 5–1 retired

Events
Singles	Doubles
← 2015 ·	Gimcheon Open ATP Challenger	· 2017 →

Alexander Sarkissian was the defending champion but chose not to defend his title.

Max Purcell won the title after Andrew Whittington retired while trailing 3–6, 7–6^{(8–6)}, 5–1 in the final.

== Seeds ==
1. (China) Zhang Ze (second round)
2. (China) Wu Di (second round)
3. (South Korea) Lee Duck-hee (first round)
4. (Australia) Luke Saville (first round)
5. (Chinese Taipei) Chen Ti (second round)
6. (Australia) Andrew Whittington (final, retired)
7. (China) Li Zhe (semifinals)
8. (Colombia) Nicolás Barrientos (first round)

== Draw ==
=== Key ===
- Q = Qualifier
- WC = Wild card
- LL = Lucky loser
- Alt = Alternate
- SE = Special exempt
- PR = Protected ranking
- ITF = ITF entry
- JE = Junior exempt
- w/o = Walkover
- r = Retired
- d = Defaulted
- SR = Special ranking

=== Finals ===
Semifinals
6	(Australia) Andrew Whittington	6	7^{7}
7	(China) Li Zhe	1	6^{3}
Q	(Australia) Max Purcell	6	6
(South Korea) Kwon Soon-woo	3	4

Final
6	(Australia) Andrew Whittington	6	6^{6}	1^{r}
Q	(Australia) Max Purcell	3	7^{8}	5

=== Top half ===
First round
1	(China) Z Zhang	2	7^{7}	6
WC	(South Korea) Kim Young-seok	6	6^{5}	4
(Japan) T Niki	6	6
Q	(South Korea) H-w Nam	4	0
(Uzbekistan) T Ismailov	6	6
(France) A Escoffier	4	3
WC	(South Korea) U-s Park	3	0
6	(Australia) A Whittington	6	6
3	(South Korea) D-h Lee	4	4
(Israel) E Leshem	6	6
(Japan) Makoto Ochi	6	6
(Japan) Yuya Kibi	3	1
(Japan) Shuichi Sekiguchi	6^{1}	6	6
Alt	(India) Sidharth Rawat	7^{7}	4	2
WC	(South Korea) J-m Seol	2	6	2
7	(China) Z Li	6	3	6

Second round
1	(China) Z Zhang	4	2
(Japan) T Niki	6	6
(Uzbekistan) T Ismailov	6^{4}	0^{r}
6	(Australia) A Whittington	7^{7}	2
(Israel) E Leshem	6	6
(Japan) M Ochi	1	1
(Japan) S Sekiguchi	3	1
7	(China) Z Li	6	6

Quarterfinals
(Japan) T Niki	6	6^{3}	5
6	(Australia) A Whittington	4	7^{7}	7
(Israel) E Leshem	3	1
7	(China) Z Li	6	6

Semifinals
6	(Australia) A Whittington	6	7^{7}
7	(China) Z Li	1	6^{3}

=== Bottom half ===
First round
8	(Colombia) N Barrientos	6	3	3
(Chinese Taipei) T-h Yang	3	6	6
Q	(South Korea) D Yoo	6^{1}	6	6
(Chinese Taipei) J Wang	7^{7}	2	4
(Japan) K Takeuchi	7^{7}	3
Q	(China) C Wang	6^{4}	0^{r}
Q	(Australia) M Purcell	6	6
4	(Australia) L Saville	4	4
5	(Chinese Taipei) T Chen	7^{7}	6
(Chinese Taipei) L-c Huang	6^{5}	4
(South Korea) S-w Kwon	6	3	6
(Belgium) Julien Dubail	4	6	3
(South Korea) Kim Cheong-eui	5	6	1
WC	(South Korea) Shin San-hui	7	2	0^{r}
(Japan) K Uchida	1	2
2	(China) D Wu	6	6

Second round
(Chinese Taipei) T-h Yang	5	6	1
Q	(South Korea) D Yoo	7	4	0^{r}
(Japan) K Takeuchi	1	6	3
Q	(Australia) M Purcell	6	2	6
5	(Chinese Taipei) T Chen	4	4
(South Korea) S-w Kwon	6	6
(South Korea) C-e Kim	6	7^{7}
2	(China) D Wu	4	6^{5}

Quarterfinals
(Chinese Taipei) T-h Yang	6^{8}	2
Q	(Australia) M Purcell	7^{10}	6
(South Korea) S-w Kwon	3	6	6
(South Korea) C-e Kim	6	3	4

Semifinals
Q	(Australia) M Purcell	6	6
(South Korea) S-w Kwon	3	4
