= 2016 Gimcheon Open ATP Challenger – Doubles =

Doubles
- 2016 Gimcheon Open ATP Challenger

Final
- Champions: (Chinese Taipei) Hsieh Cheng-peng (Chinese Taipei) Yang Tsung-hua
- Runners-up: (Colombia) Nicolás Barrientos (Philippines) Ruben Gonzales
- Score: Walkover

Events
Singles	Doubles
← 2015 ·	Gimcheon Open ATP Challenger	· 2017 →

Li Zhe and Jose Statham were the defending champions, but Statham chose not to defend his title. Li partnered Yi Chu-huan instead. Li lost in the first round to Kwon Soon-woo and Lee Duck-hee.

Hsieh Cheng-peng and Yang Tsung-hua won the title by a walkover following the withdrawal of Nicolás Barrientos and Ruben Gonzales in the final.

== Seeds ==
1. (Thailand) Sanchai Ratiwatana / (Thailand) Sonchat Ratiwatana (quarterfinals)
2. (Chinese Taipei) Hsieh Cheng-peng / (Chinese Taipei) Yang Tsung-hua (champions)
3. (China) Li Zhe / (Chinese Taipei) Yi Chu-huan (first round)
4. (China) Gong Maoxin / (China) Zhang Ze (semifinals)

== Draw ==
=== Key ===
- Q = Qualifier
- WC = Wild card
- LL = Lucky loser
- Alt = Alternate
- SE = Special exempt
- PR = Protected ranking
- ITF = ITF entry
- JE = Junior exempt
- w/o = Walkover
- r = Retired
- d = Defaulted
- SR = Special ranking

First round
1	(Thailand) Sa Ratiwatana (Thailand) So Ratiwatana	6^{6}	6	[10]
(Chinese Taipei) T Chen (Japan) T Matsui	7^{8}	3	[7]
(South Korea) Kim Young-seok (South Korea) J-m Seol	3	0
(Colombia) N Barrientos (Philippines) R Gonzales	6	6
4	(China) M Gong (China) Z Zhang	6	6
(South Korea) Kim Cheong-eui (India) Sidharth Rawat	0	2
(Australia) J Delaney (Australia) M Purcell	2	6	[10]
WC	(Uzbekistan) T Ismailov (South Korea) U-s Park	6	4	[4]
(South Korea) H-w Nam (South Korea) D Yoo	4	7^{7}	[7]
(Australia) L Saville (Australia) A Whittington	6	6^{5}	[10]
(South Korea) S-w Kwon (South Korea) D-h Lee	6	4	[10]
3	(China) Z Li (Chinese Taipei) C-h Yi	3	6	[7]
(Japan) Shuichi Sekiguchi (Japan) K Takeuchi	4	5
(Chinese Taipei) J Wang (China) D Wu	6	7
(Japan) Yuya Kibi (Japan) T Niki	4	6	[10]
2	(Chinese Taipei) C-p Hsieh (Chinese Taipei) T-h Yang	6	3	[12]

Quarterfinals
1	(Thailand) Sa Ratiwatana (Thailand) So Ratiwatana	6	3	[5]
(Colombia) N Barrientos (Philippines) R Gonzales	2	6	[10]
4	(China) M Gong (China) Z Zhang	w/o
(Australia) J Delaney (Australia) M Purcell
(Australia) L Saville (Australia) A Whittington	4	5
(South Korea) S-w Kwon (South Korea) D-h Lee	6	7
(Chinese Taipei) J Wang (China) D Wu	3	7^{8}	[8]
2	(Chinese Taipei) C-p Hsieh (Chinese Taipei) T-h Yang	6	6^{6}	[10]

Semifinals
(Colombia) N Barrientos (Philippines) R Gonzales	6	7^{9}
4	(China) M Gong (China) Z Zhang	3	6^{7}
(South Korea) S-w Kwon (South Korea) D-h Lee	6	6^{4}	[5]
2	(Chinese Taipei) C-p Hsieh (Chinese Taipei) T-h Yang	2	7^{7}	[10]

Final
(Colombia) N Barrientos (Philippines) R Gonzales
2	(Chinese Taipei) C-p Hsieh (Chinese Taipei) T-h Yang	w/o
