= 2015 Gimcheon Open ATP Challenger – Singles =

Singles
- 2015 Gimcheon Open ATP Challenger

Final
- Champion: (United States) Alexander Sarkissian
- Runner-up: (United States) Connor Smith
- Score: 7–6^{(7–5)}, 6–4

Events
Singles	Doubles
← 2014 ·	Gimcheon Open ATP Challenger	· 2016 →

Gilles Müller was the defending champion, but he did not participate. Alexander Sarkissian won the title over Connor Smith.

== Seeds ==
1. (Japan) Go Soeda (second round)
2. (Chinese Taipei) Chen Ti (first round)
3. (United States) Daniel Nguyen (first round)
4. (India) Ramkumar Ramanathan (second round)
5. (United States) Connor Smith (final)
6. (Japan) Takuto Niki (second round)
7. (Spain) David Pérez Sanz (first round)
8. (United States) Alexander Sarkissian (champion)

== Draw ==
=== Key ===
- Q = Qualifier
- WC = Wild card
- LL = Lucky loser
- Alt = Alternate
- SE = Special exempt
- PR = Protected ranking
- ITF = ITF entry
- JE = Junior exempt
- w/o = Walkover
- r = Retired
- d = Defaulted
- SR = Special ranking

=== Finals ===
Semifinals
(South Korea) Kim Cheong-eui	1	7	4
8	(United States) Alexander Sarkissian	6	5	6
(Japan) Hiroyasu Ehara	3	4
5	(United States) Connor Smith	6	6

Final
8	(United States) Alexander Sarkissian	7^{7}	6
5	(United States) Connor Smith	6^{5}	4

=== Top half ===
First round
1	(Japan) G Soeda	6	6
(India) J Nedunchezhiyan	4	2
(South Korea) Kim Cheong-eui	6	1
(Japan) T Matsui	2	0^{r}
Q	(Australia) C O'Connell	7^{7}	6
Q	(South Korea) Jang Woo-hyeok	6^{5}	3
WC	(South Korea) D-h Lee	2	3
6	(Japan) T Niki	6	6
3	(United States) D Nguyen	6^{3}	1
(South Africa) F Wolmarans	7^{7}	6
(Australia) O Jasika	3	4
WC	(South Korea) Kim Young-seok	6	6
WC	(South Korea) J-m Lee	3	2
(China) Z Li	6	6
Q	(Australia) B Mott	6^{1}	3
8	(United States) A Sarkissian	7^{7}	6

Second round
1	(Japan) G Soeda	7^{7}	5	2
(South Korea) C-e Kim	6^{4}	7	6
Q	(Australia) C O'Connell	2	6	6
6	(Japan) T Niki	6	3	1
(South Africa) F Wolmarans	3	7^{7}	3
WC	(South Korea) Y-s Kim	6	6^{5}	6
(China) Z Li	4	2
8	(United States) A Sarkissian	6	6

Quarterfinals
(South Korea) C-e Kim	7	6
Q	(Australia) C O'Connell	5	4
WC	(South Korea) Y-s Kim	4	4
8	(United States) A Sarkissian	6	6

Semifinals
(South Korea) C-e Kim	1	7	4
8	(United States) A Sarkissian	6	5	6

=== Bottom half ===
First round
7	(Spain) D Pérez Sanz	6	2	2
(Japan) Hiroyasu Ehara	0	6	6
(Serbia) M Tepavac	1	3
(Japan) Shuichi Sekiguchi	6	6
(South Africa) R Roelofse	2	4
(South Korea) J-s Nam	6	6
(Japan) K Takeuchi	2	2
4	(India) R Ramanathan	6	6
5	(United States) Connor Smith	6	6
(Japan) Yuuya Kibi	1	1
WC	(South Korea) S-w Kwon	4	6	4
PR	(India) Karunuday Singh	6	4	6
Q	(South Korea) J-w Na	4	4
(New Zealand) J Statham	6	6
(Canada) P Bester	6	6
2	(Chinese Taipei) T Chen	4	2

Second round
(Japan) H Ehara	6	6
(Japan) S Sekiguchi	4	1
(South Korea) J-s Nam	3	6	6
4	(India) R Ramanathan	6	2	3
5	(United States) Connor Smith	6	4	6
PR	(India) K Singh	3	6	4
(New Zealand) J Statham	6	2
(Canada) P Bester	2	0^{r}

Quarterfinals
(Japan) H Ehara	7	6
(South Korea) J-s Nam	5	3
5	(United States) Connor Smith	6	6
(New Zealand) J Statham	4	2

Semifinals
(Japan) H Ehara	3	4
5	(United States) Connor Smith	6	6
