= 2017 Gimcheon Open ATP Challenger – Singles =

Singles
- 2017 Gimcheon Open ATP Challenger

Final
- Champion: (Italy) Thomas Fabbiano
- Runner-up: (Russia) Teymuraz Gabashvili
- Score: 7–5, 6–1

Events
Singles	Doubles
← 2016 ·	Gimcheon Open ATP Challenger	· 2018 →

Max Purcell was the defending champion but lost to Bradley Mousley in the second qualifying round.

Thomas Fabbiano won the title after defeating Teymuraz Gabashvili 7–5, 6–1 in the final.

== Seeds ==
1. (Chinese Taipei) Lu Yen-hsun (second round)
2. (Russia) Konstantin Kravchuk (semifinals)
3. (Canada) Vasek Pospisil (quarterfinals)
4. (Ukraine) Illya Marchenko (second round)
5. (Slovenia) Blaž Kavčič (semifinals)
6. (Belgium) Ruben Bemelmans (second round)
7. (South Korea) Lee Duck-hee (second round)
8. (Japan) Go Soeda (second round)

== Draw ==
=== Key ===
- Q = Qualifier
- WC = Wild card
- LL = Lucky loser
- Alt = Alternate
- SE = Special exempt
- PR = Protected ranking
- ITF = ITF entry
- JE = Junior exempt
- w/o = Walkover
- r = Retired
- d = Defaulted
- SR = Special ranking

=== Finals ===
Semifinals
5	(Slovenia) Blaž Kavčič	4	3
(Italy) Thomas Fabbiano	6	6
(Russia) Teymuraz Gabashvili	1	6	6
2	(Russia) Konstantin Kravchuk	6	3	4

Final
(Italy) Thomas Fabbiano	7	6
(Russia) Teymuraz Gabashvili	5	1

=== Top half ===
First round
1	(Chinese Taipei) Y-h Lu	6	6
(India) P Gunneswaran	2	2
(Switzerland) M Chiudinelli	3	6	6
WC	(South Korea) Kim Cheong-eui	6	2	3
(United Kingdom) B Klein	6	6
WC	(South Korea) Y-s Chung	3	4
SE	(Argentina) JP Paz	3	3
5	(Slovenia) B Kavčič	6	6
4	(Ukraine) I Marchenko	5	7	6
(Serbia) M Tepavac	7	5	1
Q	(Australia) B Mousley	5	4
(Japan) A Santillan	7	6
(Italy) T Fabbiano	6	6
WC	(South Korea) J-m Lee	0	1
(Japan) T Ito	6	3	4
7	(South Korea) D-h Lee	4	6	6

Second round
1	(Chinese Taipei) Y-h Lu	3	1
(Switzerland) M Chiudinelli	6	6
(United Kingdom) B Klein	4	2
5	(Slovenia) B Kavčič	6	6
4	(Ukraine) I Marchenko	6	5	4
(Japan) A Santillan	1	7	6
(Italy) T Fabbiano	6	6
7	(South Korea) D-h Lee	3	2

Quarterfinals
(Switzerland) M Chiudinelli	3	4
5	(Slovenia) B Kavčič	6	6
(Japan) A Santillan	2	7	4
(Italy) T Fabbiano	6	5	6

Semifinals
5	(Slovenia) B Kavčič	4	3
(Italy) T Fabbiano	6	6

=== Bottom half ===
First round
8	(Japan) G Soeda	7^{7}	6
Q	(United States) A Krajicek	6^{3}	2
(Russia) T Gabashvili	6	6
(Australia) O Jasika	2	2
Q	(Poland) H Hurkacz	6	6
(South Korea) S-w Kwon	4	3
(Chinese Taipei) J Jung	5	0
3	(Canada) V Pospisil	7	6
6	(Belgium) R Bemelmans	6	7^{7}
(Australia) M Matosevic	1	6^{2}
Q	(United Kingdom) L Broady	7	6
(Japan) H Moriya	5	2
WC	(South Korea) S-c Hong	3	6	4
PR	(India) Y Bhambri	6	3	6
(France) S Doumbia	4	2
2	(Russia) K Kravchuk	6	6

Second round
8	(Japan) G Soeda	4	3
(Russia) T Gabashvili	6	6
Q	(Poland) H Hurkacz	6^{5}	7	1
3	(Canada) V Pospisil	7^{7}	5	6
6	(Belgium) R Bemelmans	1	6^{2}
Q	(United Kingdom) L Broady	6	7^{7}
PR	(India) Y Bhambri	2	6	3
2	(Russia) K Kravchuk	6	1	6

Quarterfinals
(Russia) T Gabashvili	6	7^{7}
3	(Canada) V Pospisil	4	6^{5}
Q	(United Kingdom) L Broady	7^{7}	5	4
2	(Russia) K Kravchuk	6^{5}	7	6

Semifinals
(Russia) T Gabashvili	1	6	6
2	(Russia) K Kravchuk	6	3	4
