= 2018 Gimcheon Open ATP Challenger – Doubles =

Doubles
- 2018 Gimcheon Open ATP Challenger

Final
- Champions: (South Africa) Ruan Roelofse (Australia) John-Patrick Smith
- Runners-up: (Thailand) Sanchai Ratiwatana (Thailand) Sonchat Ratiwatana
- Score: 6–2, 6–3

Events
Singles	Doubles
← 2017 ·	Gimcheon Open ATP Challenger	· 2019 →

Marco Chiudinelli and Teymuraz Gabashvili were the defending champions but chose not to defend their title.

Ruan Roelofse and John-Patrick Smith won the title after defeating Sanchai and Sonchat Ratiwatana 6–2, 6–3 in the final.

== Seeds ==
1. (South Africa) Ruan Roelofse / (Australia) John-Patrick Smith (champions)
2. (Belarus) Aliaksandr Bury / (Chinese Taipei) Peng Hsien-yin (semifinals)
3. (Thailand) Sanchai Ratiwatana / (Thailand) Sonchat Ratiwatana (final)
4. (Chinese Taipei) Hsieh Cheng-peng / (Indonesia) Christopher Rungkat (quarterfinals)

== Draw ==
=== Key ===
- Q = Qualifier
- WC = Wild card
- LL = Lucky loser
- Alt = Alternate
- SE = Special exempt
- PR = Protected ranking
- ITF = ITF entry
- JE = Junior exempt
- w/o = Walkover
- r = Retired
- d = Defaulted
- SR = Special ranking

First round
1	(South Africa) R Roelofse (Australia) J-P Smith	7^{7}	7
(China) M Gong (Japan) Y Uchiyama	6^{5}	5
WC	(South Korea) Kim Yu-seob (South Korea) Lim Hyung-chan	6^{5}	3
(China) D Wu (China) Ze Zhang	7^{7}	6
4	(Chinese Taipei) C-p Hsieh (Indonesia) C Rungkat	6	7^{7}
Q	(Japan) Renta Tokuda (Thailand) W Trongcharoenchaikul	2	6^{3}
(United Kingdom) B Klein (Canada) B Schnur	2	5
(Denmark) F Nielsen (Canada) V Pospisil	6	7
WC	(South Korea) Lim Min-seob (South Korea) Yoon Il-sang	3	3
(Australia) M Purcell (Australia) L Saville	6	6
(Chinese Taipei) T Chen (Chinese Taipei) C-h Yi	1	6	[8]
3	(Thailand) Sa Ratiwatana (Thailand) So Ratiwatana	6	4	[10]
WC	(South Korea) Choi Jae-won (South Korea) Moon Ju-hae	2	3
(Philippines) R Gonzales (Chinese Taipei) J Jung	6	6
(Japan) T Matsui (United States) M McDonald	5	1
2	(Belarus) A Bury (Chinese Taipei) H-y Peng	7	6

Quarterfinals
1	(South Africa) R Roelofse (Australia) J-P Smith	6	6
(China) D Wu (China) Ze Zhang	2	3
4	(Chinese Taipei) C-p Hsieh (Indonesia) C Rungkat	3	3
(Denmark) F Nielsen (Canada) V Pospisil	6	6
(Australia) M Purcell (Australia) L Saville	1	4
3	(Thailand) Sa Ratiwatana (Thailand) So Ratiwatana	6	6
(Philippines) R Gonzales (Chinese Taipei) J Jung	2	2
2	(Belarus) A Bury (Chinese Taipei) H-y Peng	6	6

Semifinals
1	(South Africa) R Roelofse (Australia) J-P Smith	w/o
(Denmark) F Nielsen (Canada) V Pospisil
3	(Thailand) Sa Ratiwatana (Thailand) So Ratiwatana	3	6	[10]
2	(Belarus) A Bury (Chinese Taipei) H-y Peng	6	3	[4]

Final
1	(South Africa) R Roelofse (Australia) J-P Smith	6	6
3	(Thailand) Sa Ratiwatana (Thailand) So Ratiwatana	2	3
