= 2017 Gimcheon Open ATP Challenger =

- Date: 1–7 May
- Edition: 4th
- Draw: 32S / 16D
- Surface: Hard
- Location: Gimcheon, South Korea

Champions

Singles
- (Italy) Thomas Fabbiano

Doubles
- (Switzerland) Marco Chiudinelli / (Russia) Teymuraz Gabashvili
← 2016 ·	Gimcheon Open ATP Challenger	· 2018 →

The 2017 Gimcheon Open ATP Challenger was a professional tennis tournament played on hard courts. It was the fourth edition of the tournament which was part of the 2017 ATP Challenger Tour. It took place in Gimcheon, Korea between 1 and 7 May 2017.

== Point distribution ==
Event	W	F	SF	QF	Round of 16	Round of 32	Q	Q2
Singles	80	48	29	15	7	0	3	0
Doubles	80	48	29	15	0	—	—	—

== Singles main-draw entrants ==
=== Seeds ===
Country	Player	Rank^{1}	Seed
TPE	Lu Yen-hsun	55	1
RUS	Konstantin Kravchuk	93	2
CAN	Vasek Pospisil	112	3
UKR	Illya Marchenko	118	4
SLO	Blaž Kavčič	128	5
BEL	Ruben Bemelmans	133	6
KOR	Lee Duck-hee	137	7
JPN	Go Soeda	143	8

- ^{1} Rankings are as of April 24, 2017.

=== Other entrants ===
The following players received wildcards into the singles main draw:

- (South Korea) Chung Yun-seong
- (South Korea) Hong Seong-chan
- (South Korea) Kim Cheong-eui
- (South Korea) Lee Jea-moon

The following player received entry into the singles main draw using a protected ranking:

- (India) Yuki Bhambri

The following player received entry into the singles main draw as a special exempt:

- (Argentina) Juan Pablo Paz

The following players received entry from the qualifying draw:

- (United Kingdom) Liam Broady
- (Poland) Hubert Hurkacz
- (United States) Austin Krajicek
- (Australia) Bradley Mousley

== Champions ==
=== Singles ===
- (Italy) Thomas Fabbiano def. (Russia) Teymuraz Gabashvili 7–5, 6–1.

=== Doubles ===
- (Switzerland) Marco Chiudinelli / (Russia) Teymuraz Gabashvili def. (South Africa) Ruan Roelofse / (Chinese Taipei) Yi Chu-huan 6–1, 6–3.
