= 2014 Adidas International Gimcheon – Doubles =

Doubles
- 2014 Adidas International Gimcheon

Final
- Champion: (Australia) Samuel Groth (Australia) Chris Guccione
- Runner-up: (United States) Austin Krajicek (Australia) John-Patrick Smith
- Score: 6–7^{(5–7)}, 7–5, [10–4]

Events
Singles	Doubles
Adidas International Gimcheon	· 2015 →

This was the first edition of the event.

Samuel Groth and Chris Guccione won the title, defeating Austin Krajicek and John-Patrick Smith in the final, 6–7^{(5–7)}, 7–5, [10–4].

== Seeds ==
1. (Australia) Samuel Groth / (Australia) Chris Guccione (champions)
2. (United States) Austin Krajicek / (Australia) John-Patrick Smith (final)
3. (Thailand) Sanchai Ratiwatana / (Thailand) Sonchat Ratiwatana (semifinals)
4. (Australia) Alex Bolt / (Australia) Andrew Whittington (first round)

== Draw ==
=== Key ===
- Q = Qualifier
- WC = Wild card
- LL = Lucky loser
- Alt = Alternate
- SE = Special exempt
- PR = Protected ranking
- ITF = ITF entry
- JE = Junior exempt
- w/o = Walkover
- r = Retired
- d = Defaulted
- SR = Special ranking

=== Draw ===
First round
1	(Australia) S Groth (Australia) C Guccione	6	7^{7}
WC	(South Korea) H Chung (South Korea) J-s Nam	4	6^{1}
PR	(Republic of Ireland) J Cluskey (Australia) J Millman	4	2
WC	(South Korea) Y-k Lim (South Korea) Noh Sang-woo	6	6
3	(Thailand) Sa Ratiwatana (Thailand) So Ratiwatana	3	7	[10]
(El Salvador) M Arévalo (Slovakia) L Lacko	6	5	[5]
(Australia) D Propoggia (Australia) M Reid	6	6
(Russia) V Baluda (Russia) K Kravchuk	3	4
(Japan) Y Sugita (Thailand) D Udomchoke	6	2	[3]
(Chinese Taipei) H-h Lee (Israel) A Weintraub	4	6	[10]
(Chinese Taipei) H-y Peng (United States) R Ram	6	6
4	(Australia) A Bolt (Australia) A Whittington	2	1
(Chinese Taipei) T Chen (Austria) M Neuchrist	2	7^{7}	[5]
(United Kingdom) J Delgado (Luxembourg) G Müller	6	6^{4}	[10]
WC	(South Korea) Kim Huyn-joon (South Korea) Lee Dong-kyu	4	2
2	(United States) A Krajicek (Australia) J-P Smith	6	6

Quarterfinals
1	(Australia) S Groth (Australia) C Guccione	6	6^{4}	[10]
WC	(South Korea) Y-k Lim (South Korea) S-w Noh	3	7^{7}	[7]
3	(Thailand) Sa Ratiwatana (Thailand) So Ratiwatana	7^{7}	5	[10]
(Australia) D Propoggia (Australia) M Reid	6^{4}	7	[7]
(Chinese Taipei) H-h Lee (Israel) A Weintraub	7	6^{7}	[10]
(Chinese Taipei) H-y Peng (United States) R Ram	5	7^{9}	[7]
(United Kingdom) J Delgado (Luxembourg) G Müller	4	1
2	(United States) A Krajicek (Australia) J-P Smith	6	6

Semifinals
1	(Australia) S Groth (Australia) C Guccione	6	4	[10]
3	(Thailand) Sa Ratiwatana (Thailand) So Ratiwatana	4	6	[3]
(Chinese Taipei) H-h Lee (Israel) A Weintraub	4	6	[4]
2	(United States) A Krajicek (Australia) J-P Smith	6	4	[10]

Finals
1	(Australia) S Groth (Australia) C Guccione	6^{5}	7	[10]
2	(United States) A Krajicek (Australia) J-P Smith	7^{7}	5	[4]
