= 2015 Gimcheon Open ATP Challenger =

- Date: 1–7 June
- Edition: 2nd
- Draw: 32S / 15D
- Prize money: $50,000
- Surface: Hard
- Location: Gimcheon, Korea

Champions

Singles
- (United States) Alexander Sarkissian

Doubles
- (China) Li Zhe / (New Zealand) Jose Rubin Statham
| ← 2014 · | Gimcheon Open ATP Challenger | · 2016 → |

The 2015 Gimcheon Open ATP Challenger was a professional tennis tournament played on hard courts. It was the second edition of the tournament which was part of the 2015 ATP Challenger Tour. It took place in Gimcheon, Korea between 1 and 7 June 2015.

== Singles main-draw entrants ==
=== Seeds ===
| Country | Player | Rank^{1} | Seed |
|---|---|---|---|
| JPN | Go Soeda | 92 | 1 |
| TPE | Chen Ti | 213 | 2 |
| USA | Daniel Nguyen | 242 | 3 |
| IND | Ramkumar Ramanathan | 258 | 4 |
| USA | Connor Smith | 271 | 5 |
| JPN | Takuto Niki | 281 | 6 |
| ESP | David Pérez Sanz | 303 | 7 |
| USA | Alexander Sarkissian | 312 | 8 |

- ^{1} Rankings are as of May 25, 2015.

=== Other entrants ===
The following players received wildcards into the singles main draw:

- (South Korea) Lee Duck-hee
- (South Korea) Lee Jea-moon
- (South Korea) Kim Young-seok
- (South Korea) Kwon Soon-woo

The following players used protected ranking to gain entry into the singles main draw:

- (India) Karunuday Singh

The following players received entry from the qualifying draw:

- (South Korea) Jang Woo-hyeok
- (Australia) Blake Mott
- (South Korea) Na Jung-woong
- (Australia) Christopher O'Connell

== Doubles main-draw entrants ==
=== Seeds ===
| Country | Player | Country | Player | Rank^{1} | Seed |
|---|---|---|---|---|---|
| CHN | Gong Maoxin | TPE | Peng Hsien-yin | 233 | 1 |
| TPE | Chen Ti | IND | Jeevan Nedunchezhiyan | 350 | 2 |
| RSA | Dean O'Brien | RSA | Ruan Roelofse | 421 | 3 |
| IRL | James Cluskey | IRL | David O'Hare | 428 | 4 |

- ^{1} Rankings as of May 25, 2015.

=== Other entrants ===
The following pairs received wildcards into the singles main draw:

- (South Korea) Kim Jae-hwan / (South Korea) Na Jung-woong
- (South Korea) Kwak Sung-hyuk / (South Korea) Um Eun-sik
- (Japan) Masamichi Imamura / (Japan) Hiroki Koshimizu

== Champions ==
=== Singles ===
- (United States) Alexander Sarkissian def. (United States) Connor Smith, 7–6^{(7–5)}, 6–4

=== Doubles ===
- (China) Li Zhe / (New Zealand) Jose Rubin Statham def. (South Africa) Dean O'Brien / (South Africa) Ruan Roelofse, 6–4, 6–1
