= 2018 Gimcheon Open ATP Challenger =

- Date: 7–13 May
- Edition: 5th
- Draw: 32S / 16D
- Surface: Hard
- Location: Gimcheon, South Korea

Champions

Singles
- (Japan) Yoshihito Nishioka

Doubles
- (South Africa) Ruan Roelofse / (Australia) John-Patrick Smith
← 2017 ·	Gimcheon Open ATP Challenger	· 2019 →

The 2018 Gimcheon Open ATP Challenger was a professional tennis tournament played on hard courts. It was the fifth edition of the tournament which was part of the 2018 ATP Challenger Tour. It took place in Gimcheon, Korea between 7 and 13 May 2018.

== Singles main-draw entrants ==
=== Seeds ===
Country	Player	Rank^{1}	Seed
AUS	Matthew Ebden	81	1
CAN	Vasek Pospisil	83	2
AUS	Jordan Thompson	94	3
ISR	Dudi Sela	97	4
~~TPE~~	~~Lu Yen-hsun~~	~~109~~	~~5~~
USA	Mackenzie McDonald	146	6
JPN	Go Soeda	149	7
TPE	Jason Jung	154	8

- ^{1} Rankings are as of 30 April 2018.

=== Other entrants ===
The following players received wildcards into the singles main draw:

- (South Korea) Chung Yun-seong
- (South Korea) Lee Duck-hee
- (South Korea) Lee Young-seok
- (South Korea) Park Ui-sung

The following players received entry from the qualifying draw:

- (Japan) Yoshihito Nishioka
- (Japan) Makoto Ochi
- (Japan) Renta Tokuda
- (Thailand) Wishaya Trongcharoenchaikul

The following player received entry as a lucky loser:

- (Australia) Luke Saville

== Champions ==
=== Singles ===
- (Japan) Yoshihito Nishioka def. (Canada) Vasek Pospisil 6–4, 7–5.

=== Doubles ===
- (South Africa) Ruan Roelofse / (Australia) John-Patrick Smith def. (Thailand) Sanchai Ratiwatana / (Thailand) Sonchat Ratiwatana 6–2, 6–3.
