= 2016 Gimcheon Open ATP Challenger =

- Date: 18–24 July
- Edition: 3rd
- Draw: 32S / 16D
- Prize money: $50,000
- Surface: Hard
- Location: Gimcheon, Korea

Champions

Singles
- (Australia) Max Purcell

Doubles
- (Chinese Taipei) Hsieh Cheng-peng / (Chinese Taipei) Yang Tsung-hua
← 2015 ·	Gimcheon Open ATP Challenger	· 2017 →

The 2016 Gimcheon Open ATP Challenger is a professional tennis tournament played on hard courts. It is the third edition of the tournament which is part of the 2016 ATP Challenger Tour. It takes place in Gimcheon, Korea between 18 and 24 July 2016.

== Singles main-draw entrants ==
=== Seeds ===
Country	Player	Rank^{1}	Seed
CHN	Zhang Ze	172	1
CHN	Wu Di	175	2
KOR	Lee Duck-hee	191	3
AUS	Luke Saville	223	4
TPE	Chen Ti	227	5
AUS	Andrew Whittington	237	6
CHN	Li Zhe	244	7
COL	Nicolás Barrientos	274	8

- ^{1} Rankings are as of July 11, 2016.

=== Other entrants ===
The following players received wildcards into the singles main draw:

- (South Korea) Kim Young-seok
- (South Korea) Park Ui-sung
- (South Korea) Seol Jae-min
- (South Korea) Shin San-hui

The following player received entry as an alternate:

- (India) Sidharth Rawat

The following players received entry from the qualifying draw:

- (South Korea) Nam Hyun-woo
- (South Korea) Daniel Yoo
- (China) Wang Chuhan
- (Australia) Max Purcell

== Doubles main-draw entrants ==
=== Seeds ===
Country	Player	Country	Player	Rank^{1}	Seed
THA	Sanchai Ratiwatana	THA	Sonchat Ratiwatana	224	1
TPE	Hsieh Cheng-peng	TPE	Yang Tsung-hua	289	2
CHN	Li Zhe	TPE	Yi Chu-huan	316	3
CHN	Gong Maoxin	CHN	Zhang Ze	338	4

- ^{1} Rankings as of July 11, 2016.

=== Other entrants ===
The following pairs received wildcards into the doubles main draw:

- (Uzbekistan) Temur Ismailov / (South Korea) Park Ui-sung

== Champions ==
=== Singles ===
- (Australia) Max Purcell def. (Australia) Andrew Whittington, 3–6, 7–6^{(8–6)}, 5–1 retired

=== Doubles ===
- (Chinese Taipei) Hsieh Cheng-peng / (Chinese Taipei) Yang Tsung-hua def. (Colombia) Nicolás Barrientos / (Philippines) Ruben Gonzales, Walkover
