= 2018 Gimcheon Open ATP Challenger – Singles =

Singles
- 2018 Gimcheon Open ATP Challenger

Final
- Champion: (Japan) Yoshihito Nishioka
- Runner-up: (Canada) Vasek Pospisil
- Score: 6–4, 7–5

Events
Singles	Doubles
- Gimcheon Open ATP Challenger

Thomas Fabbiano was the defending champion but chose not to defend his title.

Yoshihito Nishioka won the title after defeating Vasek Pospisil 6–4, 7–5 in the final.

== Seeds ==
1. (Australia) Matthew Ebden (first round, retired)
2. (Canada) Vasek Pospisil (final)
3. (Australia) Jordan Thompson (second round)
4. (Israel) Dudi Sela (second round)
5. (Chinese Taipei) Lu Yen-hsun (withdrew)
6. (United States) Mackenzie McDonald (quarterfinals)
7. (Japan) Go Soeda (quarterfinals)
8. (Chinese Taipei) Jason Jung (second round)

== Draw ==
Key

- Q = Qualifier
- WC = Wild card
- LL = Lucky loser
- Alt = Alternate
- ITF = ITF entry
- PR = Protected ranking
- SR = Special ranking
- SE = Special exempt
- JE = Junior exempt
- JR = Junior Accelerator Programme entrant
- CO = College Accelerator Programme entrant
- NG = Next Gen Accelerator Program entrant
- w/o = Walkover
- r = Retired
- d = Defaulted

=== Finals ===
Semifinals
(Australia) Max Purcell	4	0
Q	(Japan) Yoshihito Nishioka	6	6
(South Korea) Kwon Soon-woo	1	2
2	(Canada) Vasek Pospisil	6	6

Final
Q	(Japan) Yoshihito Nishioka	6	7
2	(Canada) Vasek Pospisil	4	5

=== Top half ===
First round
1	(Australia) M Ebden	7^{7}	1	0^{r}
(China) Z Li	6^{5}	6	3
(Canada) B Schnur	7^{8}	1	3
(Australia) M Purcell	6^{6}	6	6
WC	(South Korea) U-s Park	5	2
(Japan) Y Takahashi	7	6
(New Zealand) R Statham	2	6	4
7	(Japan) G Soeda	6	3	6
3	(Australia) J Thompson	6	6
WC	(South Korea) Y-s Chung	4	1
Q	(Japan) Y Nishioka	6	6
(Australia) J-P Smith	4	0
WC	(South Korea) Lee Young-seok	1	1
Q	(Japan) Makoto Ochi	6	6
WC	(South Korea) D-h Lee	7^{7}	2	3
LL	(Australia) L Saville	6^{3}	6	6

Second round
(China) Z Li	1	4
(Australia) M Purcell	6	6
(Japan) Y Takahashi	6^{3}	2
7	(Japan) G Soeda	7^{7}	6
3	(Australia) J Thompson	2	4
Q	(Japan) Y Nishioka	6	6
Q	(Japan) M Ochi	4	6	7^{7}
LL	(Australia) L Saville	6	1	6^{1}

Quarterfinals
(Australia) M Purcell	6	6
7	(Japan) G Soeda	3	3
Q	(Japan) Y Nishioka	6	6
Q	(Japan) M Ochi	2	2

Semifinals
(Australia) M Purcell	4	0
Q	(Japan) Y Nishioka	6	6

=== Bottom half ===
First round
6	(United States) M McDonald	7^{7}	7^{7}
(China) Ze Zhang	6^{4}	6^{5}
(Canada) F Peliwo	6	6
(China) D Wu	4	1
(South Korea) S-w Kwon	6	2	6
(Australia) D Kelly	4	6	2
(Australia) M Banes	3	2
4	(Israel) D Sela	6	6
8	(Chinese Taipei) J Jung	6	5	7^{7}
(Japan) T Ito	3	7	6^{4}
Q	(Japan) Renta Tokuda	6	7
Q	(Thailand) W Trongcharoenchaikul	1	5
(Australia) J Kubler	6	6
(United States) M Giron	4	2
(Japan) Y Uchiyama	7^{7}	2	2
2	(Canada) V Pospisil	6^{5}	6	6

Second round
6	(United States) M McDonald	4	6	6
(Canada) F Peliwo	6	3	1
(South Korea) S-w Kwon	4	6	6
4	(Israel) D Sela	6	3	1
8	(Chinese Taipei) J Jung	6^{6}	0
Q	(Japan) R Tokuda	7^{8}	6
(Australia) J Kubler	4	4
2	(Canada) V Pospisil	6	6

Quarterfinals
6	(United States) M McDonald	5	5
(South Korea) S-w Kwon	7	7
Q	(Japan) R Tokuda	4	4
2	(Canada) V Pospisil	6	6

Semifinals
(South Korea) S-w Kwon	1	2
2	(Canada) V Pospisil	6	6
