= Nam Hyun-woo =

Nam Hyun-woo may refer to:

- Nam Hyun-woo (field hockey)
- Nam Hyun-woo (tennis)
