= 2014 Adidas International Gimcheon – Singles =

Singles
- 2014 Adidas International Gimcheon

Final
- Champion: (Luxembourg) Gilles Müller
- Runner-up: (Japan) Tatsuma Ito
- Score: 7–6^{(7–5)}, 5–7, 6–4

Events
Singles	Doubles
Adidas International Gimcheon	· 2015 →

This was the first edition of the event.

Gilles Müller won the title, defeating Tatsuma Ito in the final, 7–6^{(7–5)}, 5–7, 6–4.

== Seeds ==
1. (Slovakia) Lukáš Lacko (semifinals)
2. (United States) Rajeev Ram (quarterfinals)
3. (Japan) Go Soeda (second round)
4. (Australia) Samuel Groth (quarterfinals)
5. (Japan) Tatsuma Ito (final)
6. (Japan) Yūichi Sugita (semifinals, retired right ankle injury)
7. (Luxembourg) Gilles Müller (champion)
8. (Japan) Hiroki Moriya (first round)

== Draw ==
=== Key ===
- Q = Qualifier
- WC = Wild card
- LL = Lucky loser
- Alt = Alternate
- SE = Special exempt
- PR = Protected ranking
- ITF = ITF entry
- JE = Junior exempt
- w/o = Walkover
- r = Retired
- d = Defaulted
- SR = Special ranking

=== Finals ===
Semifinals
1	(Slovakia) Lukáš Lacko	5	3
7	(Luxembourg) Gilles Müller	7	6
5	(Japan) Tatsuma Ito	6	2
6	(Japan) Yūichi Sugita	2	0^{r}

Final
7	(Luxembourg) Gilles Müller	7^{7}	5	6
5	(Japan) Tatsuma Ito	6^{5}	7	4

=== Top half ===
First round
1	(Slovakia) L Lacko	6	1	6
PR	(Australia) J Millman	4	6	3
Q	(Bulgaria) D Kutrovsky	6	3	4
SE	(Australia) A Bolt	2	6	6
(Lithuania) L Grigelis	3	6	6
(Australia) J-P Smith	6	4	3
(Israel) A Weintraub	6	6
8	(Japan) H Moriya	2	1
4	(Australia) S Groth	4	6	7^{8}
WC	(South Korea) Hy Chung	6	1	6^{6}
LL	(Austria) M Neuchrist	4	6^{4}
Q	(United States) J Jung	6	7^{7}
Q	(Chinese Taipei) T Chen	1	6	7^{7}
(Russia) K Kravchuk	6	2	6^{1}
(Russia) A Kudryavtsev	1	7^{7}	4
7	(Luxembourg) G Müller	6	6^{5}	6

Second round
1	(Slovakia) L Lacko	7	6
SE	(Australia) A Bolt	5	4
(Lithuania) L Grigelis	5	1
(Israel) A Weintraub	7	6
4	(Australia) S Groth	5	7^{7}	6
Q	(United States) J Jung	7	6^{5}	4
Q	(Chinese Taipei) T Chen	5	3
7	(Luxembourg) G Müller	7	6

Quarterfinals
1	(Slovakia) L Lacko	6	6
(Israel) A Weintraub	2	4
4	(Australia) S Groth	3	2
7	(Luxembourg) G Müller	6	6

Semifinals
1	(Slovakia) L Lacko	5	3
7	(Luxembourg) G Müller	7	6

=== Bottom half ===
First round
5	(Japan) T Ito	7	7
(Australia) M Reid	5	5
(United Kingdom) D Smethurst	2	7	6
(Chinese Taipei) T-h Yang	6	5	3
WC	(South Korea) Kim Young Seok	1	2
(Australia) L Saville	6	6
WC	(South Korea) Ho Chung	3	4
3	(Japan) G Soeda	6	6
6	(Japan) Y Sugita	6	6
(South Africa) R de Voest	2	4
(Switzerland) M Chiudinelli	6	6
(Australia) B Mitchell	2	4
WC	(South Korea) Y-k Lim	4	6	4
(United States) A Krajicek	6	4	6
Q	(South Africa) F Wolmarans	7^{7}	3	4
2	(United States) R Ram	6^{4}	6	6

Second round
5	(Japan) T Ito	6	7
(United Kingdom) D Smethurst	3	5
(Australia) L Saville	7^{7}	4	6
3	(Japan) G Soeda	6^{2}	6	2
6	(Japan) Y Sugita	6	6
(Switzerland) M Chiudinelli	1	2
(United States) A Krajicek	5	6	5
2	(United States) R Ram	7	4	7

Quarterfinals
5	(Japan) T Ito	6	7^{7}
(Australia) L Saville	2	6^{3}
6	(Japan) Y Sugita	6	7
2	(United States) R Ram	2	5

Semifinals
5	(Japan) T Ito	6	2
6	(Japan) Y Sugita	2	0^{r}
