= 2015 Gimcheon Open ATP Challenger – Doubles =

Doubles
- 2015 Gimcheon Open ATP Challenger

Final
- Champion: (China) Li Zhe (New Zealand) Jose Rubin Statham
- Runner-up: (South Africa) Dean O'Brien (South Africa) Ruan Roelofse
- Score: 6–4, 6–2

Events
Singles	Doubles
← 2014 ·	Gimcheon Open ATP Challenger	· 2016 →

Samuel Groth and Chris Guccione were the defending champions, but they did not participate this year.

Li Zhe and Jose Rubin Statham won the tournament, defeating Dean O'Brien and Ruan Roelofse in the final, 6–4, 6–2.

== Seeds ==
1. (China) Gong Maoxin / (Chinese Taipei) Peng Hsien-yin (quarterfinals)
2. (Chinese Taipei) Chen Ti / (India) Jeevan Nedunchezhiyan (semifinals)
3. (South Africa) Dean O'Brien / (South Africa) Ruan Roelofse (final)
4. (Republic of Ireland) James Cluskey / (Republic of Ireland) David O'Hare (first round)

== Draw ==
=== Key ===
- Q = Qualifier
- WC = Wild card
- LL = Lucky loser
- Alt = Alternate
- SE = Special exempt
- PR = Protected ranking
- ITF = ITF entry
- JE = Junior exempt
- w/o = Walkover
- r = Retired
- d = Defaulted
- SR = Special ranking

First round
1	(China) M Gong (Chinese Taipei) H-y Peng	6	6
(Japan) Yuya Kibi (Japan) T Niki	4	1
WC	(South Korea) Kim Jae-hwan (South Korea) J-w Na	2	2
(South Korea) Kim Young-seok (South Korea) J-s Nam	6	6
4	(Republic of Ireland) J Cluskey (Republic of Ireland) D O'Hare	6	5	[5]
(Australia) O Jasika (Australia) C O'Connell	3	7	[10]
WC	(Japan) M Imamura (Japan) Hiroki Koshimizu	1	2
(China) Z Li (New Zealand) J Statham	6	6
(Japan) Bumpei Sato (Japan) G Soeda	7^{7}	5	[9]
(Japan) T Matsui (Japan) Shuichi Sekiguchi	6^{5}	7	[11]
WC	(South Korea) Kwak Sung-hyuk (South Korea) Um Eun-sik	1	0
3	(South Africa) D O'Brien (South Africa) R Roelofse	6	6
(India) R Ramanathan (India) Karunuday Singh	2	6	[0]
(Japan) Hiroyasu Ehara (Japan) Yu Watanuki	6	3	[10]
(Spain) D Pérez Sanz (Serbia) M Tepavac	1	4
2	(Chinese Taipei) T Chen (India) J Nedunchezhiyan	6	6

Quarterfinals
1	(China) M Gong (Chinese Taipei) H-y Peng	4	2
(South Korea) Y-s Kim (South Korea) J-s Nam	6	6
(Australia) O Jasika (Australia) C O'Connell	1	0
(China) Z Li (New Zealand) J Statham	6	6
(Japan) T Matsui (Japan) S Sekiguchi	6^{6}	6^{5}
3	(South Africa) D O'Brien (South Africa) R Roelofse	7^{8}	7^{7}
(Japan) H Ehara (Japan) Yu Watanuki	6	3	[10]
2	(Chinese Taipei) T Chen (India) J Nedunchezhiyan	2	6	[12]

Semifinals
(South Korea) Y-s Kim (South Korea) J-s Nam	6	3	[9]
(China) Z Li (New Zealand) J Statham	4	6	[11]
3	(South Africa) D O'Brien (South Africa) R Roelofse	6	6
2	(Chinese Taipei) T Chen (India) J Nedunchezhiyan	1	3

Final
(China) Z Li (New Zealand) J Statham	6	6
3	(South Africa) D O'Brien (South Africa) R Roelofse	4	2
