= 2014 Adidas International Gimcheon =

Tennis Tournament the ATP Challenger Tour 2014

- Date: 5–11 May
- Edition: 1st
- Draw: 32S / 15D
- Prize money: $50,000
- Surface: Hard
- Location: Gimcheon, Korea

Champions

Singles
- (Luxembourg) Gilles Müller

Doubles
- (Australia) Samuel Groth / (Australia) Chris Guccione
Adidas International Gimcheon	· 2015 →

The 2014 Adidas International Gimcheon was a professional tennis tournament played on hard courts. It was the first edition of the tournament which was part of the 2014 ATP Challenger Tour. It took place in Gimcheon, Korea between 5 and 11 May 2014.

== Singles main-draw entrants ==
=== Seeds ===
Country	Player	Rank^{1}	Seed
SVK	Lukáš Lacko	83	1
USA	Rajeev Ram	128	2
JPN	Go Soeda	137	3
AUS	Samuel Groth	140	4
JPN	Tatsuma Ito	143	5
JPN	Yūichi Sugita	154	6
LUX	Gilles Müller	160	7
JPN	Hiroki Moriya	170	8

- ^{1} Rankings are as of April 28, 2014.

=== Other entrants ===
The following players received wildcards into the singles main draw:

- (South Korea) Chung Hong
- (South Korea) Chung Hyeon
- (South Korea) Kim Young-seok
- (South Korea) Lim Yong-kyu

The following players received special exempt into the singles main draw:

- (Australia) Alex Bolt

The following players used protected ranking to gain entry into the singles main draw:

- (Australia) John Millman

The following players received entry from the qualifying draw:

- (Bulgaria) Dimitar Kutrovsky
- (United States) Jason Jung
- (Chinese Taipei) Chen Ti
- (South Africa) Fritz Wolmarans

== Doubles main-draw entrants ==
=== Seeds ===
Country	Player	Country	Player	Rank^{1}	Seed
AUS	Samuel Groth	AUS	Chris Guccione	138	1
USA	Austin Krajicek	AUS	John-Patrick Smith	169	2
THA	Sanchai Ratiwatana	THA	Sonchat Ratiwatana	182	3
AUS	Alex Bolt	AUS	Andrew Whittington	210	4

- ^{1} Rankings as of April 28, 2014.

=== Other entrants ===
The following pairs received wildcards into the singles main draw:

- (South Korea) Chung Hyeon / (South Korea) Nam Ji-sung
- (South Korea) Lim Yong-kyu / (South Korea) Noh Sang-woo
- (South Korea) Kim Huyn-joon / (South Korea) Lee Dong-kyu

== Champions ==
=== Singles ===
- (Luxembourg) Gilles Müller def. (Japan) Tatsuma Ito, 7–6^{(7–5)}, 5–7, 6–4

=== Doubles ===
- (Australia) Samuel Groth / (Australia) Chris Guccione def. (United States) Austin Krajicek / (Australia) John-Patrick Smith, 6–7^{(5–7)}, 7–5, [10–4]
