= 2013 Samarkand Challenger – Singles =

Singles
- 2013 Samarkand Challenger

Final
- Champion: (Russia) Teymuraz Gabashvili
- Runner-up: (Ukraine) Oleksandr Nedovyesov
- Score: 6–3, 6–4

Events
| Singles | Doubles |
| ← 2012 · | Samarkand Challenger | · 2014 → |

Dušan Lajović was the defending champion but decided not to participate.
Teymuraz Gabashvili defeated Oleksandr Nedovyesov 6–3, 6–4 in the final to win the title.

== Seeds ==
1. (Czech Republic) Jiří Veselý (first round)
2. (Russia) Teymuraz Gabashvili (champion)
3. (Ukraine) Oleksandr Nedovyesov (final)
4. (Russia) Konstantin Kravchuk (first round)
5. (Czech Republic) Jan Mertl (second round)
6. (Spain) Javier Martí (first round)
7. (Uzbekistan) Farrukh Dustov (semifinals)
8. (Chinese Taipei) Chen Ti (second round)

== Draw ==
=== Key ===
- Q = Qualifier
- WC = Wild card
- LL = Lucky loser
- Alt = Alternate
- SE = Special exempt
- PR = Protected ranking
- ITF = ITF entry
- JE = Junior exempt
- w/o = Walkover
- r = Retired
- d = Defaulted
- SR = Special ranking

=== Finals ===
Semifinals
7 | (Uzbekistan) Farrukh Dustov | 6^{5} | 3
3 | (Ukraine) Oleksandr Nedovyesov | 7^{7} | 6
PR | (Spain) Pere Riba | 6 | 6^{3} | 2
2 | (Russia) Teymuraz Gabashvili | 3 | 7^{7} | 6

Final
3 | (Ukraine) Oleksandr Nedovyesov | 3 | 4
2 | (Russia) Teymuraz Gabashvili | 6 | 6

=== Top half ===
First round
1 | (Czech Republic) J Veselý | 3 | 6 | 3
(Serbia) F Krajinović | 6 | 2 | 6
WC | (Uzbekistan) V Uzakov | 5 | 3
Q | (Belarus) S Betov | 7 | 6
(France) Antoine Benneteau | 5 | 1
Q | (Russia) A Kudryavtsev | 7 | 6
(New Zealand) M Venus | 5 | 6 | 4
7 | (Uzbekistan) F Dustov | 7 | 4 | 6
3 | (Ukraine) O Nedovyesov | 6 | 6
(Portugal) R Machado | 3 | 2
(India) V Vardhan | 3 | 2
(Spain) Marc Giner | 6 | 6
(Russia) Alexander Lobkov | 3 | 2
(Portugal) F Gil | 6 | 6
(Moldova) R Albot | 7^{7} | 6
6 | (Spain) J Martí | 6^{5} | 2

Second round
(Serbia) F Krajinović | 6 | 6
Q | (Belarus) S Betov | 0 | 4
Q | (Russia) A Kudryavtsev | 2 | 0
7 | (Uzbekistan) F Dustov | 6 | 6
3 | (Ukraine) O Nedovyesov | 6 | 4 | 7^{7}
(Spain) M Giner | 2 | 6 | 6^{4}
(Portugal) F Gil | 6^{4} | 4
(Moldova) R Albot | 7^{7} | 6

Quarterfinals
(Serbia) F Krajinović | 2 | 2
7 | (Uzbekistan) F Dustov | 6 | 6
3 | (Ukraine) O Nedovyesov | 7^{7} | 6
(Moldova) R Albot | 6^{3} | 1

Semifinals
7 | (Uzbekistan) F Dustov | 6^{5} | 3
3 | (Ukraine) O Nedovyesov | 7^{7} | 6

=== Bottom half ===
First round
5 | (Czech Republic) J Mertl | 6 | 7^{7}
Q | (Ukraine) D Molchanov | 1 | 6^{2}
(Slovakia) Adrian Sikora | 5 | 6 | 6^{4}
(France) L Pouille | 7 | 3 | 7^{7}
WC | (Uzbekistan) Sergey Shipilov | 6 | 6
WC | (Uzbekistan) S Ikramov | 2 | 2
PR | (Spain) P Riba | 7^{8} | 7^{7}
4 | (Russia) K Kravchuk | 6^{6} | 6^{4}
8 | (Chinese Taipei) T Chen | 6 | 1 | 6
WC | (Uzbekistan) T Ismailov | 3 | 6 | 3
Q | (Belarus) A Bury | 6 | 6
(Croatia) D Marcan | 2 | 3
(Spain) G Olaso | 6^{2} | 6 | 7
(Slovakia) J Kovalík | 7^{7} | 1 | 5
(Croatia) T Androić | 2 | 2
2 | (Russia) T Gabashvili | 6 | 6

Second round
5 | (Czech Republic) J Mertl | 7^{7} | 4 | 4
(France) L Pouille | 6^{3} | 6 | 6
WC | (Uzbekistan) S Shipilov | 1 | 2
PR | (Spain) P Riba | 6 | 6
8 | (Chinese Taipei) T Chen | 5 | 4
Q | (Belarus) A Bury | 7 | 6
(Spain) G Olaso | 7 | 2 | 2
2 | (Russia) T Gabashvili | 5 | 6 | 6

Quarterfinals
(France) L Pouille | 6^{4} | 7^{10} | 3
PR | (Spain) P Riba | 7^{7} | 6^{8} | 6
Q | (Belarus) A Bury | 6^{3} | 5
2 | (Russia) T Gabashvili | 7^{7} | 7

Semifinals
PR | (Spain) P Riba | 6 | 6^{3} | 2
2 | (Russia) T Gabashvili | 3 | 7^{7} | 6
