= 2017 Gimcheon Open ATP Challenger – Doubles =

Doubles
- 2017 Gimcheon Open ATP Challenger

Final
- Champions: (Switzerland) Marco Chiudinelli (Russia) Teymuraz Gabashvili
- Runners-up: (South Africa) Ruan Roelofse (Chinese Taipei) Yi Chu-huan
- Score: 6–1, 6–3

Events
Singles	Doubles
- Gimcheon Open ATP Challenger

Hsieh Cheng-peng and Yang Tsung-hua were the defending champions but chose not to defend their title.

Marco Chiudinelli and Teymuraz Gabashvili won the title after defeating Ruan Roelofse and Yi Chu-huan 6–1, 6–3 in the final.

== Seeds ==
1. (Thailand) Sanchai Ratiwatana / (Thailand) Sonchat Ratiwatana (quarterfinals)
2. (Australia) Bradley Mousley / (Australia) Luke Saville (quarterfinals)
3. (Australia) Steven de Waard / (New Zealand) Ben McLachlan (first round)
4. (Republic of Ireland) David O'Hare / (United Kingdom) Joe Salisbury (quarterfinals)

== Draw ==
Key

- Q = Qualifier
- WC = Wild card
- LL = Lucky loser
- Alt = Alternate
- ITF = ITF entry
- PR = Protected ranking
- SR = Special ranking
- SE = Special exempt
- JE = Junior exempt
- JR = Junior Accelerator Programme entrant
- CO = College Accelerator Programme entrant
- NG = Next Gen Accelerator Program entrant
- w/o = Walkover
- r = Retired
- d = Defaulted

First round
1	(Thailand) Sa Ratiwatana (Thailand) So Ratiwatana	6	7^{7}
(Japan) T Matsui (Japan) G Soeda	1	6^{0}
PR	(India) Y Bhambri (United Kingdom) B Klein	4	6	[10]
WC	(South Korea) Y-s Chung (South Korea) S-w Kwon	6	4	[3]
3	(Australia) S de Waard (New Zealand) B McLachlan	6^{1}	6	[8]
(Switzerland) M Chiudinelli (Russia) T Gabashvili	7^{7}	4	[10]
(United States) A Krajicek (United States) J Withrow	4	7^{7}	[8]
(Belgium) R Bemelmans (Germany) P Petzschner	6	6^{5}	[10]
(South Africa) R Roelofse (Chinese Taipei) C-h Yi	5	6	[10]
WC	(South Korea) Choi Jae-won (South Korea) Moon Ju-hae	7	4	[5]
Q	(Poland) H Hurkacz (Austria) L Miedler	6^{3}	5
4	(Republic of Ireland) D O'Hare (United Kingdom) J Salisbury	7^{7}	7
WC	(South Korea) H Chung (South Korea) J-m Lee	7	6
(Italy) T Fabbiano (South Korea) D-h Lee	5	2
(Australia) O Jasika (Japan) A Santillan	5	3
2	(Australia) B Mousley (Australia) L Saville	7	6

Quarterfinals
1	(Thailand) Sa Ratiwatana (Thailand) So Ratiwatana	7^{7}	4	[9]
PR	(India) Y Bhambri (United Kingdom) B Klein	6^{3}	6	[11]
(Switzerland) M Chiudinelli (Russia) T Gabashvili	1
(Belgium) R Bemelmans (Germany) P Petzschner	0^{r}
(South Africa) R Roelofse (Chinese Taipei) C-h Yi	6	6
4	(Republic of Ireland) D O'Hare (United Kingdom) J Salisbury	2	4
WC	(South Korea) H Chung (South Korea) J-m Lee	6	4	[10]
2	(Australia) B Mousley (Australia) L Saville	3	6	[5]

Semifinals
PR	(India) Y Bhambri (United Kingdom) B Klein	6	3	[7]
(Switzerland) M Chiudinelli (Russia) T Gabashvili	4	6	[10]
(South Africa) R Roelofse (Chinese Taipei) C-h Yi	7^{12}	5	[10]
WC	(South Korea) H Chung (South Korea) J-m Lee	6^{10}	7	[5]

Final
(Switzerland) M Chiudinelli (Russia) T Gabashvili	6	6
(South Africa) R Roelofse (Chinese Taipei) C-h Yi	1	3
