= Alexander Sarkissian =

Armenian-American tennis player

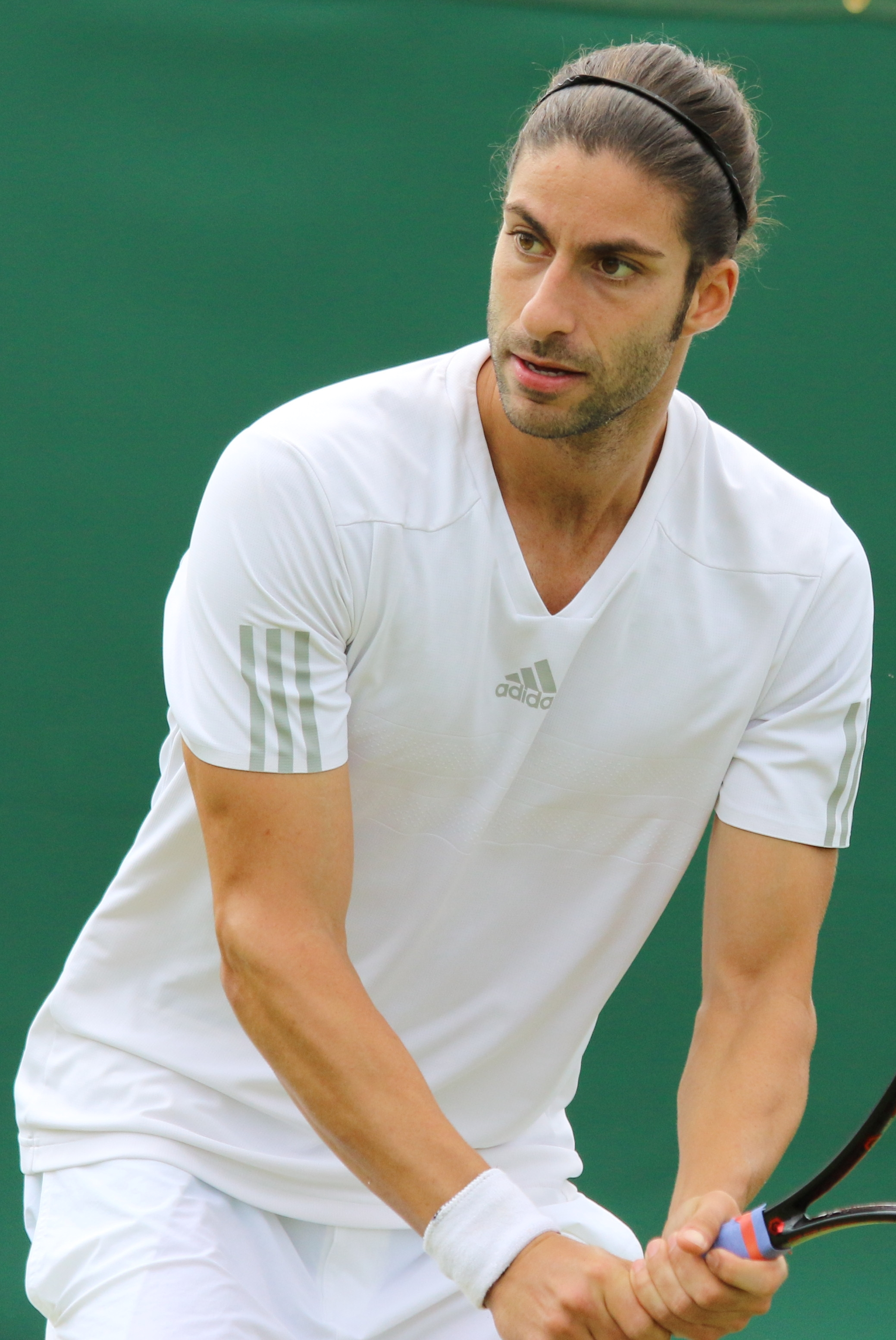
- Country (sports): United States
- Born: April 3, 1990 (age 35) Glendale, California, U.S.
- Height: 6 ft 3 in (1.91 m)
- Turned pro: 2014
- Plays: Right-handed (two-handed backhand)
- College: Pepperdine University
- Coach: Federico Browne
- Prize money: $273,158

Singles
- Career record: 2–4
- Career titles: 0
- Highest ranking: No. 157 (4 April 2016)

Grand Slam singles results
- Australian Open: Q2 (2017)
- Wimbledon: Q1 (2016)
- US Open: Q1 (2015, 2017)

Doubles
- Career record: 0–0
- Career titles: 0
- Highest ranking: No. 683 (9 May 2016)

Alexander Sarkissian (born April 3, 1990) is an American professional tennis player of Armenian descent. He won his first ATP Challenger title at the 2015 Gimcheon Open ATP Challenger in South Korea in June 2015.

== ATP Challenger Tour finals ==
=== Singles: 1 (1–0) ===
Legend

Legend (singles)
Challengers (1)

Outcome	W–L	Date	Tournament	Surface	Opponent	Score
Winner	1–0	Jun 2015	Gimcheon, South Korea	Hard	(United States) Connor Smith	7–6^{(7–5)}, 6–4
