= Teymuraz Gabashvili =

Russian tennis player

Teymuraz Gabashvili Теймураз Габашвили
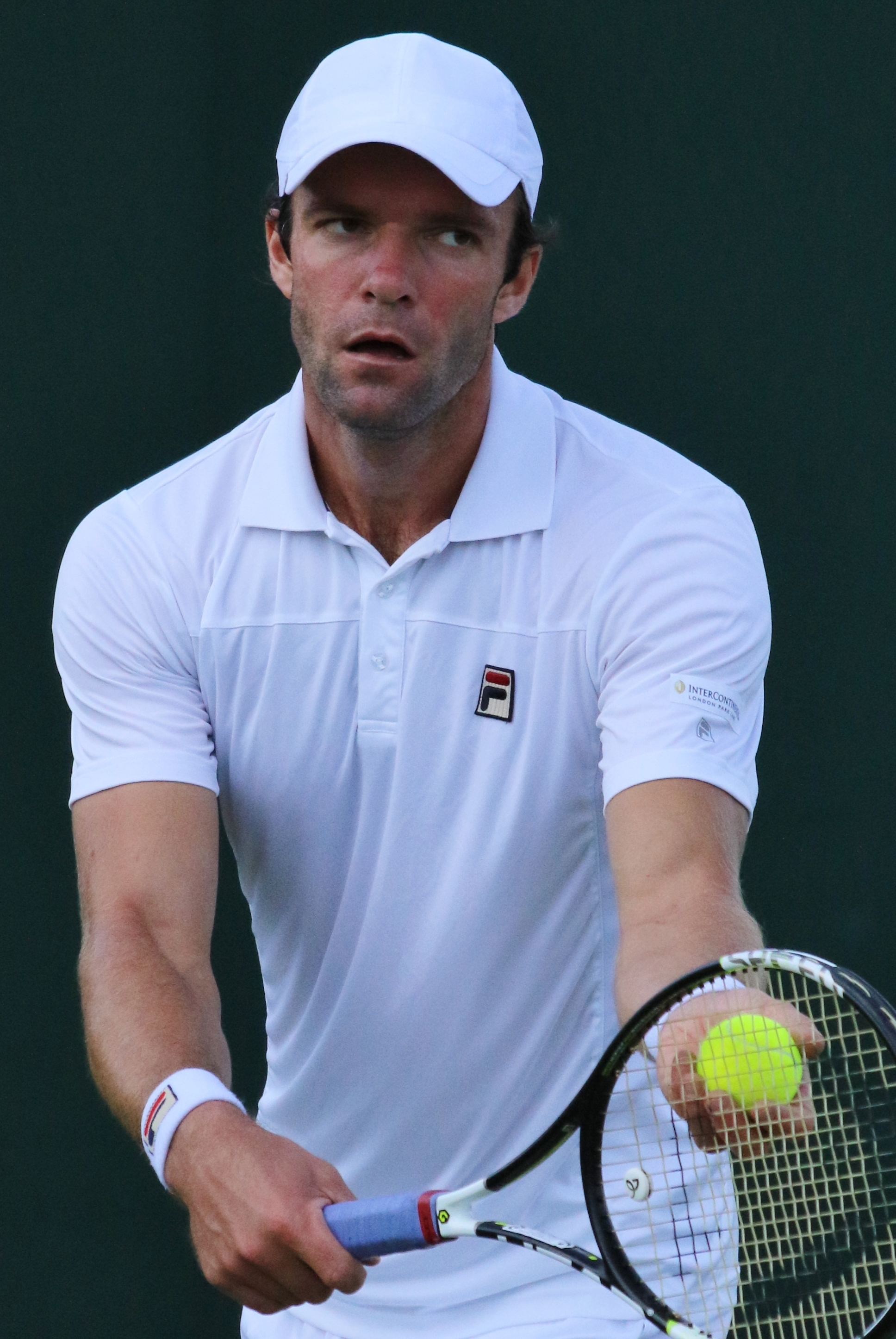
- Gabashvili at the 2016 Wimbledon Championships
- Country (sports): Russia
- Residence: Moscow, Russia
- Born: 23 May 1985 (age 41) Tbilisi, Georgian SSR, Soviet Union
- Height: 1.85 m (6 ft 1 in)
- Turned pro: 2001
- Retired: August 2024 (last match played)
- Plays: Right-handed (two-handed backhand)
- Coach: Guillermo Cañas (2015–2021); Dominic Mahboubi (-2021)
- Prize money: US $4,233,173

Singles
- Career record: 116–199 (at ATP Tour level, Grand Slam level, and in Davis Cup)
- Career titles: 0
- Highest ranking: No. 43 (1 February 2016)

Grand Slam singles results
- Australian Open: 3R (2014)
- French Open: 4R (2010, 2015)
- Wimbledon: 2R (2010)
- US Open: 3R (2014)

Other tournaments
- Olympic Games: 1R (2016)

Doubles
- Career record: 47–86 (at ATP Tour level, Grand Slam level, and in Davis Cup)
- Career titles: 1
- Highest ranking: No. 101 (13 April 2015)

Grand Slam doubles results
- Australian Open: 1R (2011, 2014, 2015, 2016)
- French Open: 3R (2011)
- Wimbledon: 2R (2014, 2015)
- US Open: 2R (2007)

Team competitions
- Davis Cup: QF (2009, 2010)

Teymuraz Besikovich Gabashvili (Russian: Теймураз Бесикович Габашвили, IPA: [tɛɪ̯mʊˈraz ɡəbɐˈʂvʲilʲɪ]; born 23 May 1985) is a Russian-Georgian former professional tennis player. He has a career-high singles ranking of World No. 43 achieved on 1 February 2016 and a doubles ranking of No. 101 achieved on 13 April 2015. He has reached the fourth round of the 2010 and 2015 French Open.

On 18 November 2021, Gabashvili was banned from competition for 20 months after testing positive for furosemide.

== Tennis career ==
=== 2001–2002: Juniors ===
As a junior Gabashvili posted a singles win–loss record of 38–34 (47–29 in doubles) and reached as high as no. 33 in the junior world singles rankings (and no. 40 in doubles) in January 2002.

Junior Slam results:

Australian Open: 3R (2002)
French Open: 1R (2001, 2002)
Wimbledon: 1R (2002)
US Open: 2R (2001)

=== 2003–2006: ATP debut ===
Gabashvili made his ATP tour debut in 2004 in Båstad, where he lost to Olivier Patience of France.

=== 2007–2009 ===
At Wimbledon, Gabashvili faced Roger Federer in the first round and lost.

In the first round of the 2007 US Open, Gabashvili defeated World No. 7 Fernando González in five sets. In the fourth set, Gabashvili served for the match at 5–4, but hit three consecutive double faults. He lost the game and the set, but came back in the fifth and final set to win the match.

2008 proved to be unimpressive for Gabashvili as he lost in the first round of his first four tournaments before breaking his right wrist, effectively ending his season.

In the first round of the 2009 US Open, he lost in straight sets to American Jesse Levine.

=== 2010: French Open fourth round ===
In the third round of the 2010 French Open, he beat Andy Roddick in straight sets. However, he was beaten in the fourth round by Austria's Jürgen Melzer in four sets.

At the 2010 US Open, Gabashvili played World No. 1 Rafael Nadal in the first round, and lost.

=== 2011: Silver medalist at Summer Universiade ===
Gabashvili represented his country at the 2011 Summer Universiade held in Shenzhen and won a silver medal. Despite being ranked below the top 100 in the ATP rankings, Gabashvili was still by far the highest-ranked player in the singles draw, and was thus a favorite to win Gold. He advanced all the way to the singles final without dropping a set before suffering a surprising defeat at the hands of Lim Yong-Kyu, a member of South Korea's Davis Cup team.

=== 2012–2016: Second French Open fourth round, Top 50 debut and career-high ranking ===
At the 2015 French Open, Gabashvili repeated his 2010's result and advanced to the fourth round without losing a set, defeating in order, 10th seed Feliciano López, Juan Mónaco and Lukáš Rosol. In the fourth round, he lost in straight sets to 5th seed Kei Nishikori.

At the 2015 Citi Open, Gabashvili upset two time Grand Slam champion and world No. 3 Andy Murray in the second round in three tight sets to claim only his fourth ever win against a Top 10 player, however he lost to Ričardas Berankis in the next round in two sets.

He finished the year 2015 ranked World No. 50 for the first time in his career. On 1 February 2016, he achieved his highest career singles ranking of World No. 43.

=== 2021–2024: 20 months ban from competition, comeback ===
In November 2021, he was banned for 20 months from competing for doping. He was ranked No. 270 on 15 November 2021. He returned to the ITF Tour in August 2023.

== Personal life ==
Gabashvili speaks Russian, Georgian, Spanish and English. He has a daughter Nicole.

In July 2010, Gabashvili changed the spelling of his given name with the ATP World Tour from Teimuraz to Teymuraz.

On 18 November 2021, Gabashvili was banned from competition for 20 months after testing positive for furosemide.

== ATP career finals ==
=== Doubles: 2 (1 title, 1 runner-up) ===
| Legend Grand Slam tournaments (0–0) ATP World Tour Finals (0–0) ATP World Tour Masters 1000 (0–0) ATP World Tour 500 Series (0–0) ATP World Tour 250 Series (1–1) | Titles by surface Hard (0–1) Clay (1–0) Grass (0–0) | Titles by setting Outdoor (1–1) Indoor (0–0) |

| Result | W–L | Date | Tournament | Tier | Surface | Partner | Opponents | Score |
|---|---|---|---|---|---|---|---|---|
| Loss | 0–1 | Jul 2007 | Indianapolis Tennis Championships, US | International | Hard | (Croatia) Ivo Karlović | (Argentina) Juan Martín del Potro (United States) Travis Parrott | 6–3, 2–6, [6–10] |
| Win | 1–1 | Apr 2015 | U.S. Men's Clay Court Championships, US | 250 Series | Clay | (Lithuania) Ričardas Berankis | (Philippines) Treat Huey (United States) Scott Lipsky | 6–4, 6–4 |

== Challenger and Futures finals ==
=== Singles: 28 (15–13) ===
| Legend (singles) ATP Challenger Tour (10–10) ITF Futures Tour/World Tennis Tour (5–3) | Titles by surface Hard (6–8) Clay (9–5) Grass (0–0) Carpet (0–0) |

| Result | W–L | Date | Tournament | Tier | Surface | Opponent | Score |
|---|---|---|---|---|---|---|---|
| Win | 1–0 | Jun 2003 | Spain F10, Tenerife | Futures | Hard | (Switzerland) Roman Valent | 6–2, 6–0 |
| Win | 2–0 | Jul 2003 | Georgia F1, Tbilisi | Futures | Clay | (Czech Republic) Jan Minář | 6–4, 6–1 |
| Win | 3–0 | Jul 2003 | Georgia F2, Tbilisi | Futures | Clay | (Austria) Martin Slanar | 3–6, 6–2, 6–3 |
| Win | 4–0 | Aug 2003 | Russia F3, Zhukovsky | Futures | Clay | (Russia) Alexander Sikanov | 6–2, 2–6, 6–4 |
| Loss | 4–1 | Aug 2004 | Bukhara, Uzbekistan | Challenger | Hard | (Slovakia) Michal Mertiňák | 6–3, 4–6, 3–6 |
| Loss | 4–2 | Jun 2005 | Barcelona, Spain | Challenger | Clay | (Argentina) Sergio Roitman | 2–6, 3–6 |
| Win | 5–2 | Jul 2005 | Poznań, Poland | Challenger | Clay | (Chile) Adrián García | 6–4, 6–2 |
| Loss | 5–3 | Nov 2005 | Reunion Island, Réunion | Challenger | Hard | (Germany) Philipp Kohlschreiber | 2–6, 3–6 |
| Win | 6–3 | May 2008 | Telde, Spain | Challenger | Clay | (Spain) Pablo Andújar | 6–4, 4–6, 6–1 |
| Win | 7–3 | Jun 2008 | Karlsruhe, Germany | Challenger | Clay | (Germany) Tobias Kamke | 6–1, 6–4 |
| Win | 8–3 | Jun 2008 | Milan, Italy | Challenger | Clay | (Argentina) Diego Hartfield | 6–4, 4–6, 6–4 |
| Win | 9–3 | Oct 2008 | Mons, Belgium | Challenger | Hard (i) | (France) Édouard Roger-Vasselin | 6–4, 6–4 |
| Loss | 9–4 | Jul 2009 | Braunschweig, Germany | Challenger | Clay | (Spain) Óscar Hernández Pérez | 1–6, 6–3, 4–6 |
| Loss | 9–5 | Aug 2011 | Astana, Kazakhstan | Challenger | Hard | (Germany) Rainer Schüttler | 6–7^{(6–8)}, 6–4, 4–6 |
| Loss | 9–6 | May 2012 | Bordeaux, France | Challenger | Clay | (Slovakia) Martin Kližan | 5–7, 3–6 |
| Win | 10–6 | May 2013 | Qarshi, Uzbekistan | Challenger | Hard | (Moldova) Radu Albot | 6–4, 6–4 |
| Win | 11–6 | May 2013 | Samarkand, Uzbekistan | Challenger | Clay | (Ukraine) Oleksandr Nedovyesov | 6–3, 6–4 |
| Loss | 11–7 | Sep 2013 | Kenitra, Morocco | Challenger | Clay | (Austria) Dominic Thiem | 6–7^{(4–7)}, 1–5 ret. |
| Loss | 11–8 | Oct 2013 | Tashkent, Uzbekistan | Challenger | Hard | (Israel) Dudi Sela | 1–6, 2–6 |
| Win | 12–8 | May 2015 | Karshi, Uzbekistan | Challenger | Hard | (Russia) Evgeny Donskoy | 5–2 ret. |
| Win | 13–8 | May 2015 | Samarkand, Uzbekistan | Challenger | Clay | (India) Yuki Bhambri | 6–3, 6–1 |
| Win | 14–8 | Jun 2015 | Fergana, Uzbekistan | Challenger | Hard | (Russia) Alexander Kudryavtsev | 6–2, 1–0 ret. |
| Loss | 14–9 | May 2017 | Gimcheon, South Korea | Challenger | Hard | (Italy) Thomas Fabbiano | 5–7, 1–6 |
| Loss | 14–10 | Apr 2018 | Egypt F11, Sharm El Sheikh | Futures | Hard | (Austria) Lucas Miedler | 3–6, 5–7 |
| Win | 15–10 | Apr 2018 | Egypt F12, Sharm El Sheikh | Futures | Hard | (Austria) Lucas Miedler | 6–2, 6–3 |
| Loss | 15–11 | Apr 2018 | Kazakhstan F5, Shymkent | Futures | Clay | (Kazakhstan) Denis Yevseyev | 2–6, 3–6 |
| Loss | 15–12 | Jan 2019 | M25 Kazan, Russia | World Tennis Tour | Hard (i) | (Uzbekistan) Sanjar Fayziev | 3–6, 5–7 |
| Loss | 15–13 | Jan 2021 | Potchefstroom, South Africa | Challenger | Hard | (United States) Jenson Brooksby | 6–2, 3–6, 0–6 |

=== Doubles: 21 (14–7) ===
| Legend (doubles) ATP Challenger Tour (10–6) ITF Futures Tour (4–1) | Titles by surface Hard (9–4) Clay (5–3) Grass (0–0) Carpet (0–0) |

| Result | W–L | Date | Tournament | Tier | Surface | Partner | Opponents | Score |
|---|---|---|---|---|---|---|---|---|
| Win | 1–0 | Aug 2002 | Russia F2, Saransk | Futures | Clay | (Russia) Alexander Pavlioutchenkov | (Russia) Sergei Demekhine (Russia) Ivan Syrov | 6–4, 7–6^{(7–3)} |
| Win | 2–0 | Jun 2003 | Spain F9, La Palma | Futures | Hard | (Russia) Alexander Pavlioutchenkov | (Spain) Rafael Moreno-Negrín (Spain) Ferran Ventura-Martell | 6–4, 6–4 |
| Win | 3–0 | Aug 2004 | Togliatti, Russia | Challenger | Hard | (Russia) Dmitri Vlasov | (United Kingdom) James Auckland (Slovakia) Ladislav Švarc | 6–3, 5–7, 6–4 |
| Win | 4–0 | Nov 2005 | Reunion Island, Réunion | Challenger | Hard | (France) Stéphane Robert | (Croatia) Ivan Cerović (Serbia and Montenegro) Petar Popović | 6–4, 6–3 |
| Win | 5–0 | Oct 2006 | Grenoble, France | Challenger | Hard (i) | (Russia) Evgeny Korolev | (France) Thomas Oger (France) Nicolas Tourte | 7–5, 6–4 |
| Win | 6–0 | Sep 2009 | Trnava, Slovakia | Challenger | Clay | (Bulgaria) Grigor Dimitrov | (Czech Republic) Jan Minář (Czech Republic) Lukáš Rosol | 6–4, 2–6, [10–8] |
| Loss | 6–1 | Oct 2009 | Mons, Belgium | Challenger | Hard (i) | (Colombia) Alejandro Falla | (Uzbekistan) Denis Istomin (Russia) Evgeny Korolev | 7–6^{(7–4)}, 6–7^{(4–7)}, [9–11] |
| Loss | 6–2 | Jul 2011 | Dortmund, Germany | Challenger | Clay | (Russia) Andrey Kuznetsov | (Germany) Dominik Meffert (Germany) Björn Phau | 4–6, 3–6 |
| Win | 7–2 | May 2012 | Ostrava, Czech Republic | Challenger | Clay | (Moldova) Radu Albot | (Czech Republic) Adam Pavlásek (Czech Republic) Jiří Veselý | 7–5, 5–7, [10–8] |
| Loss | 7–3 | Jun 2012 | Monza, Italy | Challenger | Clay | (Italy) Stefano Ianni | (Kazakhstan) Andrey Golubev (Kazakhstan) Yuriy Schukin | 6–7^{(4–7)}, 7–5, [7–10] |
| Win | 8–3 | Apr 2013 | Savannah, USA | Challenger | Clay | (Ukraine) Denys Molchanov | (United States) Michael Russell (United States) Tim Smyczek | 6–2, 7–5 |
| Win | 9–3 | Oct 2013 | Tashkent, Uzbekistan | Challenger | Hard | (Russia) Mikhail Elgin | (India) Purav Raja (India) Divij Sharan | 6–4, 6–4 |
| Win | 10–3 | May 2017 | Gimcheon, South Korea | Challenger | Hard | (Switzerland) Marco Chiudinelli | (South Africa) Ruan Roelofse (Chinese Taipei) Yi Chu-huan | 6–1, 6–3 |
| Loss | 10–4 | Mar 2018 | Russia F3, Kazan | Futures | Hard (i) | (Russia) Roman Safiullin | (Russia) Alexander Pavlioutchenkov (Russia) Evgenii Tiurnev | 4–6, 6–3, [6–10] |
| Win | 11–4 | Apr 2018 | Egypt F12, Sharm El Sheikh | Futures | Hard | (Austria) Lucas Miedler | (Ukraine) Marat Deviatiarov (Ukraine) Vladyslav Manafov | 6–4, 6–0 |
| Loss | 11–5 | May 2019 | Samarkand, Uzbekistan | Challenger | Clay | (Uzbekistan) Sergey Fomin | (Portugal) Gonçalo Oliveira (Belarus) Andrei Vasilevski | 6–3, 3–6, [4–10] |
| Win | 12–5 | Aug 2019 | Portorož, Slovenia | Challenger | Hard | (Spain) Carlos Gómez-Herrera | (Austria) Lucas Miedler (Austria) Tristan-Samuel Weissborn | 6–3, 6–2 |
| Loss | 12–6 | Sep 2019 | Baotou, China | Challenger | Hard | (India) Sasikumar Mukund | (South Korea) Nam Ji-sung (South Korea) Song Min-kyu | 6–7^{(3–7)}, 2–6 |
| Loss | 12–7 | Jan 2020 | Rennes, France | Challenger | Hard | (Slovakia) Lukáš Lacko | (Austria) Tristan-Samuel Weissborn (Croatia) Antonio Šančić | 5–7, 7–6^{(7–5)}, [7–10] |
| Win | 13-7 | Nov 2020 | Cary, United States | Challenger | Hard | (United States) Dennis Novikov | (United Kingdom) Luke Bambridge (United States) Nathaniel Lammons | 7–5, 4–6, [10–8] |
| Win | 14–7 | Oct 2023 | Telavi, Georgia | Futures | Clay | (Georgia (country)) Aleksandre Metreveli | (Kazakhstan) Grigoriy Lomakin (Georgia (country)) Zura Tkemaladze | 6–4, 6–4 |

== Career performance timeline ==
Key
| W | F | SF | QF | #R | RR | Q# | DNQ | A | NH |

(W) winner; (F) finalist; (SF) semifinalist; (QF) quarterfinalist; (#R) rounds 4, 3, 2, 1; (RR) round-robin stage; (Q#) qualification round; (DNQ) did not qualify; (A) absent; (NH) not held; (SR) strike rate (events won / competed); (W–L) win–loss record.

=== Singles ===
| Tournament | 2006 | 2007 | 2008 | 2009 | 2010 | 2011 | 2012 | 2013 | 2014 | 2015 | 2016 | 2017 | 2018 | W–L | Win % |
|---|---|---|---|---|---|---|---|---|---|---|---|---|---|---|---|
Grand Slam tournaments
| Australian Open | A | 1R | A | 1R | 1R | 1R | A | A | 3R | 1R | 1R | Q1 | Q1 | 2–7 | 22.22 |
| French Open | A | 1R | A | 2R | 4R | 1R | Q1 | Q3 | 2R | 4R | 3R | 1R | A | 10–8 | 55.56 |
| Wimbledon | A | 1R | A | 1R | 2R | 1R | Q2 | 1R | 1R | 1R | 1R | Q3 | A | 1–8 | 11.11 |
| US Open | 2R | 2R | 1R | 1R | 1R | A | 1R | Q1 | 3R | 2R | 1R | Q1 | A | 5–9 | 35.71 |
| Win–loss | 1–1 | 1–4 | 0–1 | 1–4 | 4–4 | 0–3 | 0–1 | 0–1 | 5–4 | 4–4 | 2–4 | 0–0 | 0–0 | 18–31 | 36.73 |
ATP World Tour Masters 1000
| Indian Wells Masters | A | 3R | Q1 | 2R | A | 1R | A | A | 2R | 1R | 1R | Q1 | A | 4–6 | 40.00 |
| Miami Masters | A | 2R | Q1 | 2R | A | 2R | A | A | 2R | 2R | 1R | Q1 | A | 5–6 | 45.45 |
| Monte Carlo Masters | 1R | 1R | Q1 | Q1 | Q2 | A | A | A | 2R | A | 1R | A | A | 1–4 | 20.00 |
| Rome Masters | 1R | 1R | A | Q2 | A | Q1 | A | A | A | A | 1R | A | A | 0–3 | 00.00 |
| Hamburg Masters | A | Q2 | A | Not Masters Series | | | | | | | | | | 0–0 | 00.00 |
| Madrid Masters | A | Q2 | A | 1R | A | Q1 | A | A | 1R | A | 1R | A | A | 0–3 | 00.00 |
| Canada Masters | 1R | Q2 | A | Q1 | A | A | Q2 | Q1 | A | A | A | A | A | 0–1 | 00.00 |
| Cincinnati Masters | A | Q2 | A | Q1 | A | A | A | Q1 | 1R | A | A | A | A | 0–1 | 00.00 |
| Shanghai Masters | Not Masters Series | | | | Q1 | Q2 | A | A | 1R | Q1 | A | A | A | 0–1 | 00.00 |
| Paris Masters | 3R | 1R | A | Q1 | Q1 | Q1 | A | A | Q1 | 1R | A | A | A | 2–3 | 40.00 |
| Win–loss | 1–4 | 3–5 | 0–0 | 2–3 | 0–0 | 1–2 | 0–0 | 0–0 | 3–6 | 1–3 | 0–5 | 0–0 | 0–0 | 12–28 | 30.00 |
| Year-end ranking | 112 | 125 | 65 | 106 | 80 | 138 | 182 | 76 | 67 | 50 | 138 | 237 | 368 | | |

=== Doubles ===
| Tournament | 2007 | 2008 | 2009 | 2010 | 2011 | 2012 | 2013 | 2014 | 2015 | 2016 | 2017 | 2018 | 2019 | 2020 | W–L | Win % |
|---|---|---|---|---|---|---|---|---|---|---|---|---|---|---|---|---|
Grand Slam tournaments
| Australian Open | A | A | A | A | 1R | A | A | 1R | 1R | 1R | A | A | A | A | 0–4 | 0% |
| French Open | 1R | A | 2R | A | 3R | A | A | 2R | A | 1R | A | A | A | A | 4–5 | 45% |
| Wimbledon | 1R | A | A | A | A | A | Q1 | 2R | 2R | A | A | A | A | A | 2–3 | 40% |
| US Open | 2R | 1R | 1R | 1R | A | A | A | 1R | 1R | A | A | A | A | A | 1–6 | 14% |
| Win–loss | 1–3 | 0–1 | 1–2 | 0–1 | 2–2 | 0–0 | 0–0 | 2–4 | 1–3 | 0–2 | 0–0 | 0–0 | 0–0 | 0–0 | 7–18 | 38.88% |
| Year-end ranking | 172 | 279 | 184 | 237 | 130 | 307 | 191 | 165 | 130 | 326 | 281 | 448 | 185 | 152 | | |

== Wins over top 10 players ==
| # | Player | Rank | Event | Surface | Rd | Score |
2007
| 1. | (Chile) Fernando González | 7 | US Open, New York, United States | Hard | 1R | 6–4, 6–1, 3–6, 5–7, 6–4 |
2010
| 2. | (United States) Andy Roddick | 8 | Roland Garros, Paris, France | Clay | 3R | 6–4, 6–4, 6–2 |
2014
| 3. | (Spain) David Ferrer | 5 | Barcelona, Spain | Clay | 2R | 6–4, 6–2 |
2015
| 4. | (United Kingdom) Andy Murray | 3 | Washington, D.C., United States | Hard | 2R | 6–4, 4–6, 7–6^{(7–4)} |

== National participation ==
=== Davis Cup (6–6) ===
| Group membership World Group (1–3) WG Play-off (1–3) Group I (4–0) Group II (0–0) Group III (0–0) Group IV (0–0) | Matches by surface Hard (5–4) Clay (0–2) Grass (0–0) Carpet (1–0) | Matches by Type Singles (6–4) Doubles (0–2) |

- ▲ ▼ indicates the outcome of the Davis Cup match followed by the score, date, place of event, the zonal classification and its phase, and the court surface.

| Rubber outcome | No. | Rubber | Match type (partner if any) | Opponent nation | Opponent player(s) | Score |
▲4–1; 6–8 March 2009; Sala Transilvania, Sibiu, Romania; World Group; Carpet(i) surface
| Victory | 1 | V | Singles (dead rubber) | Romania | Victor Crivoi | 6–4, 6–2 |
▲3–2; 5–7 March 2010; Small Sports Arena "Luzhniki", Moscow, Russia; World Group; Hard(i) surface
| Defeat | 2 | III | Doubles (with Igor Kunitsyn) | India | Mahesh Bhupathi / Leander Paes | 3–6, 2–6, 2–6 |
| Defeat | 3 | V | Singles (dead rubber) | India | Rohan Bopanna | 6–7^{(5–7)}, 4–6 |
▼2–3; 4–6 March 2011; Boråshallen, Borås, Sweden; World Group; Hard(i) surface
| Defeat | 4 | II | Singles | Sweden | Joachim Johansson | 3–6, 6–7^{(4–7)}, 4–6 |
▼0–5; 14–16 September 2012; Harmonia Tenis Clube, São José do Rio Preto, Brazil; World Group play-offs; Clay surface
| Defeat | 5 | II | Singles | Brazil | Thomaz Bellucci | 3–6, 6–4, 0–6, 6–7^{(4–7)} |
| Defeat | 6 | III | Doubles (with Alex Bogomolov Jr.) | Brazil | Marcelo Melo / Bruno Soares | 5–7, 2–6, 6–7^{(7–9)} |
▼2–3; 31 January – 2 February 2014; Olympic Stadium, Moscow, Russia; Europe/Africa First round play-off; Hard(i) surface
| Victory | 7 | V | Singles (dead rubber) | Poland | Michał Przysiężny | 7–5, 7–5 |
▼1–4; 18–20 September 2015; Baikal-Arena, Irkutsk, Russia; World Group play-offs; Hard(i) surface
| Victory | 8 | I | Singles | Italy | Simone Bolelli | 7–6^{(7–2)}, 6–1, 6–3 |
| Defeat | 9 | IV | Singles | Italy | Fabio Fognini | 6–7^{(4–7)}, 3–6, 6–7^{(5–7)} |
▲5–0; 4–6 March 2016; Kazan Tennis Academy, Kazan, Russia; Europe/Africa First round play-off; Hard(i) surface
| Victory | 10 | II | Singles | Sweden | Daniel Windahl | 6–3, 6–1, 6–1 |
| Victory | 11 | IV | Singles (dead rubber) | Sweden | Isak Arvidsson | 6–4, 6–0 |
▲4–1; 15–17 July 2016; National Tennis Centre, Moscow, Russia; World Group Second round; Hard surface
| Victory | 12 | II | Singles | Netherlands | Thiemo de Bakker | 6–7^{(3–7)}, 7–6^{(7–4)}, 6–4, 6–4 |

=== ATP Cup (2–1) ===
Matches by surface
Hard (2–1)
Clay (0–0)
Grass (0–0)

Matches by type
Singles (0–0)
Doubles (2–1)

| Rubber outcome | No. | Rubber | Match type (partner if any) | Opponent nation | Opponent player(s) | Score |
▲8–1; 3–7 January 2020; Perth Arena, Perth, Australia; Group stage; Hard surface
| Victory | 1 | III | Doubles (with Konstantin Kravchuk) | Norway | Viktor Durasovic / Casper Ruud | 7–6^{(7–4)}, 6–4 |
3–3; 10–11 January 2020; Ken Rosewall Arena, Sydney, Australia; Knockout stage; Hard surface
| Victory | 2 | III | Doubles (with Konstantin Kravchuk) | Argentina | Máximo González / Andrés Molteni | 7–6^{(7–5)}, 6–4 |
| Defeat | 3 | III | Doubles (with Konstantin Kravchuk) | Serbia | Nikola Ćaćić / Viktor Troicki | 4–6, 6–7^{(7–9)} |
