= Ruan Roelofse =

South African tennis player

- Country (sports): South Africa
- Residence: Cape Town, South Africa
- Born: 18 November 1989 (age 36) Cape Town, South Africa
- Height: 1.88 m (6 ft 2 in)
- Plays: Right-handed
- Prize money: $224,927

Singles
- Career record: 3–8
- Career titles: 0
- Highest ranking: No. 357 (27 February 2012)

Grand Slam singles results
- Australian Open Junior: Q2 (2007)
- US Open Junior: Q1 (2006, 2007)

Doubles
- Career record: 12–7
- Career titles: 0
- Highest ranking: No. 122 (16 April 2016)

Grand Slam doubles results
- Australian Open Junior: 1R (2007)
- Last updated on: 1 April 2019.

Ruan Roelofse (born 18 November 1989) is a professional South African tennis coach and a former player. He has a career high ATP singles ranking of world No. 357 achieved on 27 February 2012 and a doubles ranking of No. 122 achieved on 18 April 2016. Roelofse is currently the coach of professional player Michael Zheng.

== Career ==
He had success playing doubles, winning 6 ATP Challenger doubles titles. Roelofse has also won 2 ITF singles titles and 39 ITF doubles titles.

Roelofse has represented South Africa at the Davis Cup where he has a W/L record of 12–7.

== ATP Challenger and ITF Tour finals ==
=== Singles: 11 (2–9) ===
| Legend (singles) ATP Challenger Tour (0–0) ITF Futures/World Tennis Tour (2–9) | Titles by surface Hard (2–8) Clay (0–1) Grass (0–0) Carpet (0–0) |

| Result | W–L | Date | Tournament | Tier | Surface | Opponent | Score |
|---|---|---|---|---|---|---|---|
| Loss | 0–1 | Mar 2011 | Turkey F7, Antalya | Futures | Hard | (Moldova) Radu Albot | 5–7, 4–6 |
| Win | 1–1 | May 2011 | South Africa F1, Durban | Futures | Hard | (Austria) Nikolaus Moser | 6–4, 7–5 |
| Loss | 1–2 | Sep 2011 | Israel F9, Be'er Sheva | Futures | Hard | (Germany) Stefan Seifert | 2–6, 3–6 |
| Loss | 1–3 | Oct 2011 | Nigeria F3, Lagos | Futures | Hard | (India) Yuki Bhambri | 5–7, 5–7 |
| Loss | 1–4 | Nov 2011 | Burundi F1, Bujumbura | Futures | Clay | (Austria) Gerald Melzer | 4–6, 2–6 |
| Loss | 1–5 | Oct 2012 | Nigeria F2, Lagos | Futures | Hard | (Spain) Enrique López Pérez | 0–6, 4–6 |
| Win | 2–5 | Jul 2014 | Hong Kong F2, Hong Kong | Futures | Hard | (South Korea) Lee Duck-hee | 6–4, 3–6, 2–0 ret. |
| Loss | 2–6 | Aug 2014 | Gabon F2, Libreville | Futures | Hard | (Republic of Ireland) Sam Barry | 3–6, 5–7 |
| Loss | 2–7 | Oct 2014 | Zimbabwe F1, Harare | Futures | Hard | (Netherlands) Boy Westerhof | 3–6, 6–7^{(5–7)} |
| Loss | 2–8 | Dec 2018 | South Africa F3, Stellenbosch | Futures | Hard | (Zimbabwe) Benjamin Lock | 7–6^{(7–3)}, 3–6, 2–6 |
| Loss | 2–9 | Aug 2019 | M15, Jakarta, Indonesia | World Tennis Tour | Hard | (Japan) Sho Shimabukuro | 6–7^{(3–7)}, 2–6 |

=== Doubles: 82 (45–39) ===
| Legend (doubles) ATP Challenger Tour (6–15) ITF Futures/World Tennis Tour (40–23) | Titles by surface Hard (37–35) Clay (6–2) Grass (0–1) Carpet (1–0) |

| Result | W–L | Date | Tournament | Tier | Surface | Partner | Opponents | Score |
|---|---|---|---|---|---|---|---|---|
| Win | 1–0 | Sep 2009 | Burundi F1, Bujumbura | Futures | Clay | (South Africa) Hendrik Coertzen | (Romania) Bogdan-Victor Leonte (India) Rupesh Roy | 6–4, 6–2 |
| Win | 2–0 | Sep 2009 | Rwanda F1, Kigali | Futures | Clay | (South Africa) Hendrik Coertzen | (Nigeria) Sunday Emmanuel (Uganda) Duncan Mugabe | 6–3, 7–5 |
| Loss | 2–1 | Oct 2009 | South Africa F1, Pretoria | Futures | Hard | (South Africa) Hendrik Coertzen | (South Africa) Andrew Anderson (South Africa) Benjamin Janse van Rensburg | 3–6, 5–7 |
| Win | 3–1 | Sep 2010 | Uganda F1, Kampala | Futures | Clay | (United Kingdom) James Feaver | (Zimbabwe) Takanyi Garanganga (Uganda) Duncan Mugabe | 7–6^{(10–8)}, 6–2 |
| Loss | 3–2 | Oct 2010 | Nigeria F2, Lagos | Futures | Hard | (South Africa) Raven Klaasen | (Israel) Amir Weintraub (Netherlands) Boy Westerhof | 7–5, 4–6, [6–10] |
| Loss | 3–3 | Feb 2011 | Turkey F4, Antalya | Futures | Hard | (Czech Republic) Michal Konečný | (Belarus) Sergey Betov (Ukraine) Denys Molchanov | 4–6, 1–6 |
| Loss | 3–4 | Jul 2011 | Spain F22, Palma del Río | Futures | Hard | (South Africa) Nicolaas Scholtz | (Spain) Juan José Leal-Gómez (Spain) Borja Rodríguez Manzano | 3–6, 6–3, [10–12] |
| Win | 4–4 | Jul 2011 | Spain F23, Bakio | Futures | Hard | (South Africa) Nicolaas Scholtz | (Italy) Francesco Borgo (Italy) Claudio Grassi | 7–5, 6–3 |
| Loss | 4–5 | Aug 2011 | Great Britain F12, London | Futures | Hard | (India) Sanam Singh | (United Kingdom) David Rice (United Kingdom) Sean Thornley | 3–6, 2–6 |
| Win | 5–5 | Sep 2011 | Israel F7, Akko | Futures | Hard | (Russia) Mikhail Vasiliev | (Italy) Erik Crepaldi (Italy) Claudio Grassi | 6–3, 6–3 |
| Loss | 5–6 | Sep 2011 | Israel F9, Be'er Sheva | Futures | Hard | (Russia) Vitali Reshetnikov | (Italy) Francesco Borgo (Slovakia) Marko Daniš | 2–6, 3–6 |
| Win | 6–6 | Nov 2011 | Rwanda F1, Kigali | Futures | Clay | (Austria) Gerald Melzer | (Egypt) Omar Hedayet (Egypt) Karim-Mohamed Maamoun | 6–7^{(1–7)}, 7–6^{(7–4)}, [10–8] |
| Loss | 6–7 | Jan 2012 | Israel F1, Eilat | Futures | Hard | (South Africa) Jean Andersen | (Italy) Claudio Grassi (Italy) Matteo Volante | 4–6, 6–4, [9–11] |
| Loss | 6–8 | Jan 2012 | Israel F2, Eilat | Futures | Hard | (South Africa) Jean Andersen | (Italy) Claudio Grassi (Netherlands) Antal van der Duim | 3–6, 5–7 |
| Loss | 6–9 | Feb 2012 | Turkey F4, Antalya | Futures | Hard | (Kuwait) Abdullah Maqdes | (Bosnia and Herzegovina) Damir Džumhur (Bosnia and Herzegovina) Aldin Šetkić | 4–6, 6–4, [5–10] |
| Loss | 6–10 | Feb 2012 | Turkey F5, Antalya | Futures | Hard | (South Africa) Jean Andersen | (Turkey) Tuna Altuna (Czech Republic) Jiří Školoudík | 5–7, 6–7^{(4–7)} |
| Loss | 6–11 | Mar 2012 | France F5, Poitiers | Futures | Hard (i) | (France) Gleb Sakharov | (France) Olivier Patience (France) Nicolas Renavand | 2–6, 3–6 |
| Win | 7–11 | Mar 2012 | France F6, Saint-Raphaël | Futures | Hard (i) | (South Africa) Jean Andersen | (France) Thomas le Boulch (France) Baptiste Maitre | 6–2, 6–4 |
| Loss | 7–12 | Jul 2012 | Anning, China, P.R. | Challenger | Clay | (Thailand) Kittiphong Wachiramanowong | (Thailand) Sanchai Ratiwatana (Thailand) Sonchat Ratiwatana | 6–4, 6–7^{(1–7)}, [11–13] |
| Win | 8–12 | Sep 2012 | Great Britain F14, Chiswick | Futures | Hard | (United Kingdom) David Rice | (United Kingdom) Harry Meehan (United Kingdom) Stefan Sterland-Markovic | 7–5, 7–6^{(9–7)} |
| Win | 9–12 | Sep 2012 | Great Britain F15, London | Futures | Hard | (South Africa) Jean Andersen | (New Zealand) Marcus Daniell (Mexico) Manuel Sánchez | 6–2, 4–6, [12–10] |
| Win | 10–12 | Sep 2012 | Kuwait F2, Meshref | Futures | Hard | (Kuwait) Abdullah Maqdes | (France) Clément Reix (France) Romain Sichez | 6–4, 6–4 |
| Win | 11–12 | Oct 2012 | Kuwait F3, Meshref | Futures | Hard | (United Kingdom) Lewis Burton | (Kuwait) Mohammad Ghareeb (Russia) Mikhail Vasiliev | 7–6^{(7–5)}, 7–6^{(7–2)} |
| Win | 12–12 | Oct 2012 | Nigeria F1, Lagos | Futures | Hard | (Slovakia) Kamil Čapkovič | (Italy) Alessandro Bega (Spain) Enrique López Pérez | 6–4, 6–2 |
| Win | 13–12 | Oct 2012 | Nigeria F2, Lagos | Futures | Hard | (Slovakia) Kamil Čapkovič | (Italy) Alessandro Bega (Spain) Enrique López Pérez | 6–1, 6–2 |
| Win | 14–12 | Nov 2012 | Zimbabwe F1, Harare | Futures | Hard | (South Africa) Keith-Patrick Crowley | (United States) Joel Kincaid (United States) Evan Song | 3–6, 6–3, [10–5] |
| Win | 15–12 | Dec 2012 | South Africa F1, Potchefstroom | Futures | Hard | (South Africa) Jean Andersen | (France) Simon Cauvard (France) Elie Rousset | 6–1, 4–6, [10–7] |
| Win | 16–12 | Dec 2012 | South Africa F2, Potchefstroom | Futures | Hard | (South Africa) Jean Andersen | (France) Simon Cauvard (France) Elie Rousset | 7–6^{(7–5)}, 4–6, [10–5] |
| Win | 17–12 | Feb 2013 | Burnie, Australia | Challenger | Hard | (Australia) John-Patrick Smith | (Australia) Brydan Klein (Australia) Dane Propoggia | 6–2, 6–2 |
| Loss | 17–13 | Feb 2013 | Australia F2, Mildura | Futures | Grass | (Australia) Colin Ebelthite | (Australia) Sam Groth (Australia) John-Patrick Smith | 3–6, 4–6 |
| Win | 18–13 | Mar 2013 | Bahrain F1, Manama | Futures | Hard | (Switzerland) Riccardo Maiga | (Colombia) Cristian Rodríguez (Spain) Jordi Samper Montaña | 6–3, 6–3 |
| Win | 19–13 | Jun 2013 | Turkey F25, Istanbul | Futures | Hard | (South Africa) Dean O'Brien | (Turkey) Barış Ergüden (Turkey) Barkın Yalçınkale | 6–1, 4–6, [11–9] |
| Loss | 19–14 | Jul 2013 | Istanbul, Turkey | Challenger | Hard | (Australia) Brydan Klein | (Republic of Ireland) James Cluskey (France) Fabrice Martin | 6–3, 3–6, [5–10] |
| Win | 20–14 | Aug 2013 | USA F22, Edwardsville | Futures | Hard | (South Africa) Keith-Patrick Crowley | (United States) Patrick Davidson (Australia) Leon Frost | 6–3, 6–1 |
| Win | 21–14 | Sep 2013 | Kuwait F2, Meshref | Futures | Hard | (France) Tak Khunn Wang | (United Kingdom) Lewis Burton (United Kingdom) Marcus Willis | 4–6, 6–3, [10–6] |
| Win | 22–14 | Oct 2013 | Nigeria F1, Lagos | Futures | Hard | (Croatia) Ante Pavić | (Croatia) Borna Ćorić (Croatia) Dino Marcan | 7–6^{(7–3)}, 6–2 |
| Win | 23–14 | Oct 2013 | Nigeria F2, Lagos | Futures | Hard | (Croatia) Ante Pavić | (Croatia) Borna Ćorić (Croatia) Dino Marcan | 7–5, 6–3 |
| Loss | 23–15 | Mar 2014 | China F2, Guangzhou | Futures | Hard | (Chinese Taipei) Chen Ti | (Italy) Riccardo Ghedin (Italy) Claudio Grassi | 4–6, 1–6 |
| Win | 24–15 | Apr 2014 | Qatar F2, Doha | Futures | Hard | (Chinese Taipei) Chen Ti | (United Kingdom) Luke Bambridge (France) Antoine Benneteau | 6–4, 6–3 |
| Win | 25–15 | Apr 2014 | Qatar F3, Doha | Futures | Hard | (Chinese Taipei) Chen Ti | (United Kingdom) Oliver Golding (United Kingdom) Joshua Ward-Hibbert | 6–1, 6–1 |
| Win | 26–15 | May 2014 | Korea F2, Seoul | Futures | Hard | (Australia) Dane Propoggia | (South Korea) Chung Hong (South Korea) Nam Ji-sung | 6–0, 6–3 |
| Win | 27–15 | May 2014 | South Africa F1, Sun City | Futures | Hard | (South Africa) Fritz Wolmarans | (Sweden) Jacob Adaktusson (Sweden) Milos Sekulic | 6–1, 6–4 |
| Win | 28–15 | Jun 2014 | South Africa F3, Sun City | Futures | Hard | (South Africa) Dean O'Brien | (South Africa) Nicolaas Scholtz (South Africa) Tucker Vorster | 7–6^{(8–6)}, 6–4 |
| Loss | 28–16 | Jul 2014 | Thailand F9, Bangkok | Futures | Hard | (Chinese Taipei) Chen Ti | (Thailand) Pruchya Isaro (Thailand) Nuttanon Kadchapanan | 4–6, 1–6 |
| Win | 29–16 | Jul 2014 | Hong Kong F2, Hong Kong | Futures | Hard | (Japan) Arata Onozawa | (United States) Peter Kobelt (United States) Devin McCarthy | 6–2, 4–6, [10–4] |
| Loss | 29–17 | Jul 2014 | Hong Kong F3, Hong Kong | Futures | Hard | (Japan) Arata Onozawa | (United States) Peter Kobelt (United States) Devin McCarthy | 7–5, 3–6, [4–10] |
| Win | 30–17 | Aug 2014 | Turkey F27, Ankara | Futures | Clay | (Australia) Gavin van Peperzeel | (Turkey) Tuna Altuna (Turkey) Anıl Yüksel | 6–1, 6–1 |
| Loss | 30–18 | Aug 2014 | Gabon F1, Libreville | Futures | Hard | (Zimbabwe) Mark Fynn | (Republic of Ireland) Sam Barry (India) Jeevan Nedunchezhiyan | 2–6, 2–6 |
| Loss | 30–19 | Aug 2014 | Gabon F2, Libreville | Futures | Hard | (Zimbabwe) Mark Fynn | (Republic of Ireland) Sam Barry (India) Jeevan Nedunchezhiyan | 6–7^{(5–7)}, 3–6 |
| Win | 31–19 | Sep 2014 | Turkey F31, Antalya | Futures | Hard | (Syria) Issam Haitham Taweel | (France) Bastien Favier (France) Hugo Grenier | 2–6, 6–1, [10–4] |
| Loss | 31–20 | Oct 2014 | Zimbabwe F2, Harare | Futures | Hard | (South Africa) Keith-Patrick Crowley | (France) Grégoire Barrère (France) Arthur Surreaux | 1–6, 2–6 |
| Loss | 31–21 | Jan 2015 | Turkey F3, Antalya | Futures | Hard | (China) Li Zhe | (Austria) Lucas Miedler (Austria) Maximilian Neuchrist | 4–6, 4–6 |
| Win | 32–21 | Feb 2015 | Turkey F4, Antalya | Futures | Hard | (China) Li Zhe | (Germany) Jan Choinski (Germany) Kevin Krawietz | 6–3, 4–6, [10–2] |
| Win | 33–21 | Feb 2015 | Turkey F6, Antalya | Futures | Hard | (South Africa) Tucker Vorster | (France) Gleb Sakharov (Austria) Tristan-Samuel Weissborn | 6–3, 2–6, [10–7] |
| Loss | 33–22 | Feb 2015 | Turkey F7, Antalya | Futures | Hard | (South Africa) Tucker Vorster | (Ukraine) Marat Deviatiarov (Austria) Tristan-Samuel Weissborn | 6–7^{(5–7)}, 2–6 |
| Win | 34–22 | Mar 2015 | Turkey F8, Antalya | Futures | Hard | (South Africa) Tucker Vorster | (Ukraine) Marat Deviatiarov (Austria) Tristan-Samuel Weissborn | 6–7^{(5–7)}, 7–6^{(7–4)}, [12–10] |
| Win | 35–22 | Mar 2015 | Israel F2, Herzlia | Futures | Hard | (United States) Matt Seeberger | (United States) Cameron Silverman (United States) Raleigh Smith | 2–6, 6–4, [12–10] |
| Loss | 35–23 | Mar 2015 | Bahrain F1, Manama | Futures | Hard | (United States) Matt Seeberger | (Czech Republic) Dominik Kellovský (Slovenia) Tom Kočevar-Dešman | 6–7^{(4–7)}, 6–4, [7–10] |
| Loss | 35–24 | May 2015 | Eskişehir, Turkey | Challenger | Hard | (Chinese Taipei) Chen Ti | (Belarus) Sergey Betov (Russia) Mikhail Elgin | 4–6, 7–6^{(7–2)}, [7–10] |
| Win | 36–24 | May 2015 | Turkey F21, Antalya | Futures | Hard | (Venezuela) Ricardo Rodríguez | (Turkey) Altuğ Çelikbilek (Turkey) Sefa Suluoğlu | 6–2, 6–2 |
| Loss | 36–25 | Jun 2015 | Gimcheon, Korea, Rep. | Challenger | Hard | (South Africa) Dean O'Brien | (China) Li Zhe (New Zealand) Jose Statham | 4–6, 2–6 |
| Win | 37–25 | Jun 2015 | Uzbekistan F4, Namangan | Futures | Hard | (South Africa) Dean O'Brien | (Uzbekistan) Sanjar Fayziev (Uzbekistan) Jurabek Karimov | 7–5, 6–4 |
| Win | 38–25 | Jul 2015 | Binghamton, USA | Challenger | Hard | (South Africa) Dean O'Brien | (United States) Daniel Nguyen (United States) Dennis Novikov | 6–1, 7–6^{(7–0)} |
| Loss | 38–26 | Aug 2015 | Lexington, USA | Challenger | Hard | (South Africa) Dean O'Brien | (Australia) Carsten Ball (United Kingdom) Brydan Klein | 4–6, 6–7^{(4–7)} |
| Loss | 38–27 | Oct 2015 | Las Vegas, USA | Challenger | Hard | (South Africa) Dean O'Brien | (Australia) Carsten Ball (Germany) Dustin Brown | 6–3, 3–6, [6–10] |
| Loss | 38–28 | May 2016 | Bangkok, Thailand | Challenger | Hard | (South Africa) Dean O'Brien | (Chinese Taipei) Chen Ti (Chinese Taipei) Jason Jung | 4–6, 6–3, [8–10] |
| Win | 39–28 | Oct 2016 | USA F34, Burlingame | Futures | Hard (i) | (Philippines) Ruben Gonzales | (Republic of Ireland) Sam Barry (United States) Peter Kobelt | 6–4, 6–4 |
| Loss | 39–29 | Nov 2016 | Charlottesville, USA | Challenger | Hard (i) | (United Kingdom) Brydan Klein | (United States) Brian Baker (Australia) Sam Groth | 3–6, 3–6 |
| Loss | 39–30 | Jan 2017 | France F2, Bressuire | Futures | Hard (i) | (Croatia) Ante Pavić | (France) Corentin Denolly (France) Hugo Nys | 4–6, 2–6 |
| Loss | 39–31 | Mar 2017 | Zhuhai, China, P.R. | Challenger | Hard | (Chinese Taipei) Yi Chu-huan | (China) Gong Maoxin (China) Zhang Ze | 3–6, 6–7^{(4–7)} |
| Loss | 39–32 | May 2017 | Gimcheon, Korea, Rep. | Challenger | Hard | (Chinese Taipei) Yi Chu-huan | (Switzerland) Marco Chiudinelli (Russia) Teymuraz Gabashvili | 1–6, 3–6 |
| Win | 40–32 | Jun 2017 | Lisbon, Portugal | Challenger | Clay | (Indonesia) Christopher Rungkat | (Portugal) Fred Gil (Portugal) Gonçalo Oliveira | 7–6^{(9–7)}, 6–1 |
| Loss | 40–33 | Jul 2017 | Marburg, Germany | Challenger | Clay | (Australia) Rameez Junaid | (Argentina) Máximo González (Brazil) Fabrício Neis | 3–6, 6–7^{(4–7)} |
| Loss | 40–34 | Nov 2017 | Champaign, USA | Challenger | Hard (i) | (United Kingdom) Joe Salisbury | (India) Leander Paes (India) Purav Raja | 3–6, 7–6^{(7–5)}, [5–10] |
| Win | 41–34 | Jan 2018 | Germany F2, Nußloch | Futures | Carpet (i) | (Germany) Kevin Krawietz | (Argentina) Pedro Cachin (Germany) Daniel Masur | 6–3, 6–3 |
| Loss | 41–35 | Apr 2018 | Guadalajara, Mexico | Challenger | Hard | (United Kingdom) Brydan Klein | (El Salvador) Marcelo Arévalo (Mexico) Miguel Ángel Reyes-Varela | 6–7^{(3–7)}, 5–7 |
| Win | 42–35 | May 2018 | Gimcheon, Korea, Rep. | Challenger | Hard | (Australia) John-Patrick Smith | (Thailand) Sanchai Ratiwatana (Thailand) Sonchat Ratiwatana | 6–2, 6–3 |
| Loss | 42–36 | May 2018 | Busan, Korea, Rep. | Challenger | Hard | (Australia) John-Patrick Smith | (Chinese Taipei) Hsieh Cheng-peng (Indonesia) Christopher Rungkat | 4–6, 3–6 |
| Loss | 42–37 | Feb 2019 | Dallas, USA | Challenger | Hard (i) | (Croatia) Ante Pavić | (United States) Marcos Giron (United States) Dennis Novikov | 4–6, 6–7^{(3–7)} |
| Win | 43–37 | Aug 2019 | M15, Jakarta, Indonesia | World Tennis Tour | Hard | (Indonesia) Justin Barki | (Japan) Sho Shimabukuro (Japan) Hiroyasu Ehara | 7–6^{(7–3)}, 6–4 |
| Loss | 43-38 | Oct 2019 | Claremont M25, CA, USA | World Tennis Tour | Hard | (Philippines) Ruben Gonzales | (Germany) Milen Ianakiev (Germany) Hendrik Jebens | 4-6, 6-3, 15–17 |
| Win | 44-38 | Oct 2019 | Las Vegas, USA | Challenger | Hard | (Philippines) Ruben Gonzales | (United States) Max Schnur (United States) Nathan Pasha | 2-6, 6-3, 10–8 |
| Win | 45-38 | Feb 2021 | Potchefstroom, South Africa | Challenger | Hard | (South Africa) Raven Klaasen | (Belgium) Julien Cagnina (Czech Republic) Zdeněk Kolář | 6-4, 6–4 |
| Win | 46-38 | Jan 2022 | Weston, M25, FL, USA | World Tennis Tour | Hard | (United States) Dennis Novikov | (Burundi) Guy Orly Iradukunda (Ghana) Abraham Asaba | 7-5, 3-6, 10–3 |
| Loss | 46-39 | Mar 2022 | Bakersfield, M25, CA, USA | World Tennis Tour | Hard | (Israel) Daniel Cukierman | (South Korea) Jisung Nam (South Korea) Minkyu Song | 2-6, 0–6 |
| Win | 46-39 | Apr 2022 | Sunrise, M15, FL, USA | World Tennis Tour | Hard | (Moldova) Alexander Cozbinov | (Netherlands) Alec Deckers (Luxembourg) Alex Knaff | 6-4, 6–4 |
