= Nam Hyun-woo (tennis) =

Korean tennis player

- Country (sports): South Korea
- Born: 9 January 1985 (age 41) Incheon, South Korea
- Plays: Right-handed
- Prize money: $64,149

Singles
- Career record: 1–2 (ATP Tour & Davis Cup)
- Highest ranking: No. 449 (21 May 2007)

Doubles
- Highest ranking: No. 667 (5 February 2007)

Nam Hyun-woo (born 9 January 1985) is a Korean former professional tennis player.

Born in Incheon, Nam featured in a single Davis Cup tie for South Korea, against Malaysia in Kuala Lumpur in 2004. He won his singles rubber over Mohammed-Noor Noordin.

Nam, a quarterfinalist at the 2007 Summer Universiade, twice appeared in the main draw of a ATP Tour tournament, as a qualifier at both the 2007 Japan Open and 2008 China Open.

== See also ==
- List of South Korea Davis Cup team representatives
