= Andrew Whittington (tennis) =

Australian tennis player (born 1993)

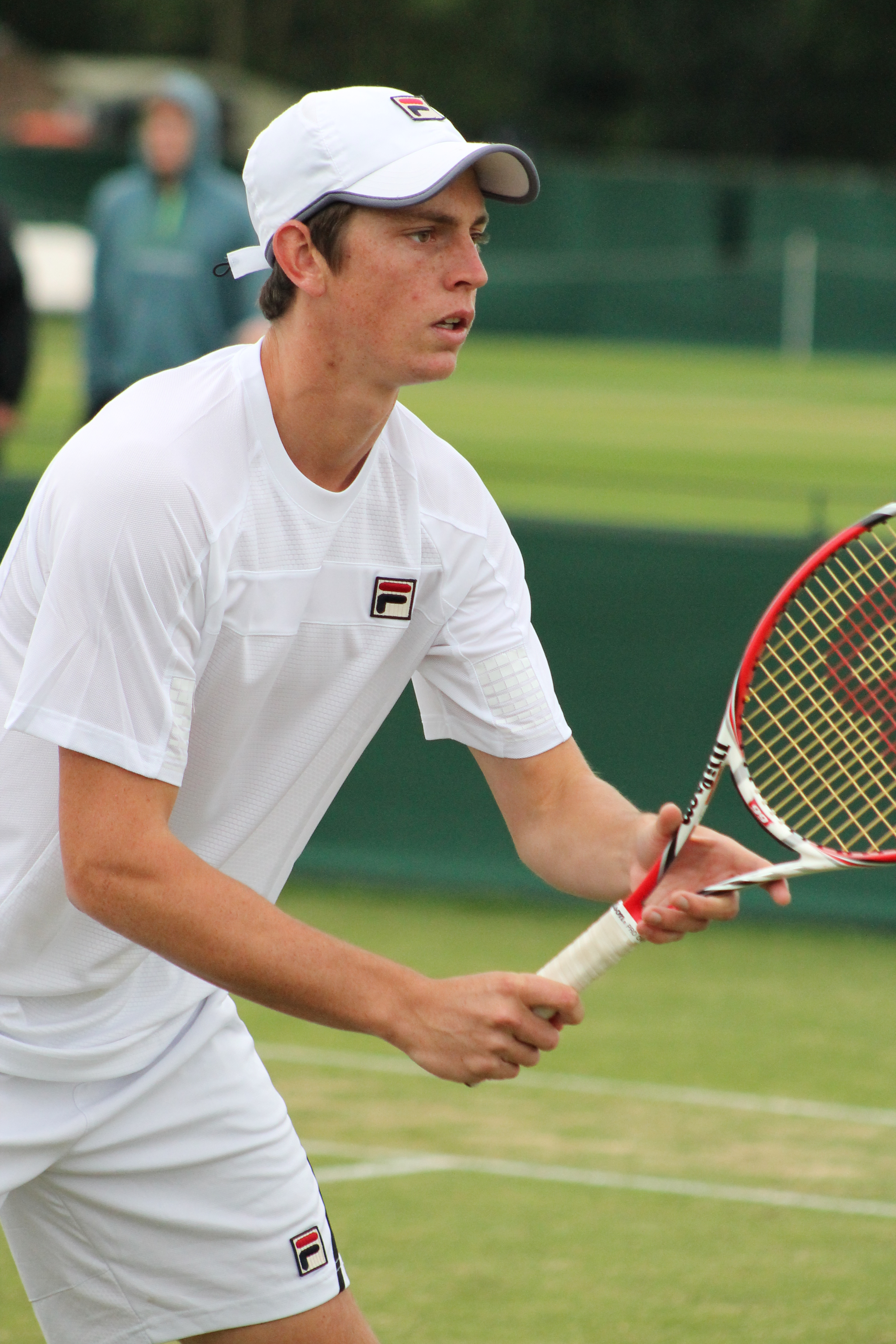
- Country (sports): Australia
- Born: 11 August 1993 (age 32) Williamstown, Victoria, Australia
- Height: 188 cm (6 ft 2 in)
- Turned pro: 2010
- Retired: 2019
- Plays: Right-handed (two-handed backhand)
- Prize money: $482,706

Singles
- Career record: 2–3 (Grand Slam, ATP Tour level, and Davis Cup)
- Career titles: 0
- Highest ranking: No. 160 (20 March 2017)

Grand Slam singles results
- Australian Open: 2R (2017)
- French Open: Q1 (2017)
- Wimbledon: 1R (2017)
- US Open: Q1 (2016)

Doubles
- Career record: 11–9
- Career titles: 0
- Highest ranking: No. 74 (15 January 2018)

Grand Slam doubles results
- Australian Open: SF (2017)
- Wimbledon: 1R (2014, 2017)

Mixed doubles

Grand Slam mixed doubles results
- Australian Open: 2R (2019)
- Last updated on: 11 August 2022.

Andrew Whittington (born 11 August 1993) is a former Australian professional tennis player. He made the world's top 200 in August 2016 following a semifinal run at the 2016 Kentucky Bank Tennis Championships. His best performance came by reaching the quarterfinals of the 2014 Australian Open with Alex Bolt. In May 2014, Whittington and Bolt won the China International Challenger, which was both players' first Challenger doubles title. He made his singles grand slam debut at the 2017 Australian Open after being given a wildcard.

Whittington turned to coaching his former doubles partner and current professional Australian tennis player Alex Bolt for the 2022 summer.

== Career ==
=== 2010–2012: Career beginnings ===
Whittington made his first singles appearance in April 2010 at the Australian F3 where he lost in round 1 to Brendan Moore. Throughout 2010/11, Whittington played mostly on the ITF circuits across Australia and the USA where he reached two quarter finals in singles. In 2011, Whittington began partnering Luke Saville in doubles. The pair won back-to-back ITF doubles titles in November. The pair were given a wild card into the 2012 Australian Open Men's doubles. They lost in round 1. In March 2012, Whittington began partnering Alex Bolt; the pair won three ITF doubles titles before June.

Whittington made his first appearance in the singles main draw of an ATP Challenger Tour at Caloundra in February 2012, losing narrowly in round 1. The remainder of 2012 was spent on the ITF Circuit across Australia and Europe and he reached two semi-finals.

=== 2013–2014: Doubles success ===
In January 2013, Whittington was given a wild card into the Burnie Challenger where he reached the quarter-finals, before playing ITF tour across USA and Europe. In April, Whittington reached his first final in Greece. He lost to Dimitar Kuzmanov in straight sets. He returned to Australia in September 2013 and lost in the final of the Australia F6 to Adam Feeney, before winning his first single title the following week at the F7 against Alex Bolt. Following the win, he told Tennis Australia "I’ve never felt like that before, I still feel like I’m out there playing." In November 2013, he won his second ITF title in Cambodia against Gavin van Peperzeel.

In doubles, Whittington played with a number of partners throughout 2013 but re-joined Alex Bolt in September and commenced a successful doubles run. The pair won three consecutive ITF doubles titles in Australia and in October, the pair reached their first Challenger final at the Melbourne Challenger, losing to Thanasi Kokkinakis and Benjamin Mitchell.

In January 2014, Whittington lost in the first round of qualifying for the 2014 Brisbane International and 2014 Australian Open.

Whittington and Bolt were given wild cards into the Men's doubles. The pair defeated the number 3 seeds David Marrero and Fernando Verdasco in round two, ultimately losing at the quarter-final stage to number 8 seed Daniel Nestor and Nenad Zimonjić. The match was played on Rod Laver Arena; the pair's first appearance on centre court. The pair then made a series of semi-finals across Australia circuit before winning their first Challenger title in Anning in May. This increased Whittington's double ranking to within the world's top 100.

In June, Whittington and Bolt qualified for the 2014 Wimbledon Championships – Men's doubles, this was the pair's first appearance at Wimbledon. They lost in round 1 to Feliciano López and Jürgen Melzer. In August, Whittington lost in the final of the Chinese Taipei F1 before returning to Australia playing in ITF and Challenger circuit. By November 2014, Whittington had reached his twentieth doubles final. Whittington ended 2014 with a singles ranking of 525 and doubles ranking of 109.

=== 2015–2016: Focus on singles and ATP World Tour debut ===
In January 2015, Whittington and Bolt made the final of the Onkaparinga Challenger, before reaching the third round of the Men's doubles. Throughout the rest of 2015, Whittington began focussing on singles matches on the ATP Challenger tour, with limited success.

Whittington commenced 2016 at the Happy Valley Challenger, qualifying for and reaching the semi-final. This was his best singles performance to date at this level. Whittington then played the Canberra and Launceston challenger events before winning his third and fourth ITF singles title in Mornington in March. He played in Nanjing, Anning and Bangkok challenger events before winning his fifth ITF title in Guam in May. In June, Whittington won three ITF titles in three weeks in Hong Kong. In July, Whittington was seeded for the first time in a Challenger Event at Gimcheon and reached his first final against Max Purcell. This was followed up by a semi final result at Lexington Challenger and quarter final result at Granby. Whittington increased his singles ranking inside the top 200 for the first time. In September, Whittington contended the US Open for the first time, losing in round 1 of qualifying to João Souza. Whittington then qualified for the main draw of an ATP World Tour for the first time in Shenzhen. In his ATP debut, he saved four match points against Luca Vanni, eventually winning 2–6, 7–6, 6–2 in two hours and 20 minutes. He lost in round 2 to Richard Gasquet. Whittington ended the year playing challenger events in Vietnam and China. Whittington ended 2016 with a career high singles ranking of 170 and a doubles ranking of 312.

=== 2017: First Grand Slam appearance ===
On 2 January 2017, Tennis Australia awarded Whittington a wild card into the 2017 Australian Open. This was Whittington's first singles appearance in a grand slam. He defeated Adam Pavlásek in 4 sets in round 1, before losing to Ivo Karlović in round 2. Whittington partnered Marc Polmans in the 2017 Australian Open – Men's doubles, where they reached the semi-finals. Whittington played on the challenger tour before heading to USA in March, where he lost in qualifying for both Indian Wells and Miami Masters. At the French Open Whittington lost in round 1 of qualifying. In June, Whittington entered the qualifying for Wimbledon. In the first round of qualifying, he recovered from a 1–4 deficit in the final set, saving break points in the sixth game against Stéphane Robert of France, to prevail 3–6, 7–5, 6–4. In R2 of Qualifying he won from a set down again, winning 6–7, 6–4, 6–4 against Tim Smyczek before qualifying for Wimbledon for the first time 4–6, 2–6, 7–6^{(7)}, 7–6^{(3)}, 6–0. Whittington saved two match points in the third set tie-break at 4–6 after coming from 2–5 down in that same tie-break against Denis Kudla. Whittington gallantly went down to Thiago Monteiro in R1, saving match points against his serve at 4–5 in the fourth set before losing that set and the match in a tie-break.

== Personal life ==
Whittington supports the Essendon Football Club in the Australian Football League. He also supports Orlando Magic in National Basketball Association.

Andrew married his partner Amelia in 2023 and they have one child, named Oscar.

== Tour finals ==
=== Singles: 14 (8–6) ===
Legend (singles) Grand Slam (0–0) ATP World Tour Finals (0–0) ATP World Tour Masters 1000 (0–0) ATP World Tour 500 Series (0–0) ATP World Tour 250 Series (0–0) ATP Challenger Tour (0–2) ITF Futures Tour (8–4)	Titles by surface Hard (8–6) Clay (0–0) Grass (0–0) Carpet (0–0)

Outcome	No.	Date	Tournament	Surface	Opponent	Score
Runner-up	1.	5 May 2013	Heraklion, Greece F5	Hard	(Bulgaria) Dimitar Kuzmanov	1–6, 2–6
Runner-up	2.	15 September 2013	Toowoomba, Australia F6	Hard	(Australia) Adam Feeney	6–7, 6–4
Winner	3.	22 September 2013	Cairns, Australia F7	Hard	(Australia) Alex Bolt	6–4, 6–4
Winner	4.	1 December 2013	Phnom Penh, Cambodia F1	Hard	(Australia) Gavin van Peperzeel	7–5, 6–0
Runner-up	5.	24 August 2014	Chinese Taipei, F1	Hard	(Taiwan) Liang Chi Huang	3–6, 4–6
Runner-up	6.	16 November 2014	Wollongong, F9, Australia	Hard	(United Kingdom) Brydan Klein	3–6, 3–6
Winner	7.	20 March 2016	Mornington, F2 Australia	Hard	(Australia) Gavin van Peperzeel	6–2, 6–3
Winner	8.	27 March 2016	Mornington, F4 Australia	Hard	(Australia) Christopher O'Connell	7–5, 6–3
Winner	9.	29 May 2016	Tumon, F1 Guam	Hard	(Japan) Shuichi Sekiguchi	7–6, 7–6
Winner	10.	12 June 2016	Hong Kong, F1	Hard	(China) He Yecong	7–5, 6–3
Winner	11.	19 June 2016	Hong Kong, F2	Hard	(Australia) Daniel Nolan	6–3, 6–3
Winner	12.	25 June 2016	Hong Kong, F3	Hard	(Japan) Jumpei Yamasaki	6–3, 6–2
Runner-up	13.	24 July 2016	Gimcheon, South Korea	Hard	(Australia) Max Purcell	6–3, 6–7, 1–5 (ret)
Runner-up	14.	26 November 2017	Hua Hin, Thailand	Hard	(Australia) John Millman	2–6, 2–6

=== Doubles: 33 (23–10) ===
Legend (singles) Grand Slam (0–0) ATP World Tour Finals (0–0) ATP World Tour Masters 1000 (0–0) ATP World Tour 500 Series (0–0) ATP World Tour 250 Series (0–0) ATP Challenger Tour (4–5) ITF Futures Tour (19–5)	Titles by surface Hard (17–7) Clay (6–2) Grass (0–1) Carpet (0–0)

Outcome	No.	Date	Tournament	Surface	Partner	Opponents	Score
Winner	1.	20 November 2011	F12 Australia	Hard	(Australia) Luke Saville	(Australia) John Peers (Australia) Dane Propaggia	4–6, 6–4, 10–5
Winner	2.	27 November 2011	F13 Australia	Hard	(Australia) Luke Saville	(Australia) Matthew Barton (Australia) Michael Look	6–7, 6–4, 12–10
Winner	3.	19 February 2012	F1 Australia	Hard	(Australia) Luke Saville	(United Kingdom) Brydan Klein (Australia) Dane Propaggia	6–7, 6–2
Winner	4.	15 April 2012	F4, Italy	Clay	(Australia) Alex Bolt	(Italy) Erik Crepaldi (Italy) Claudio Grassi	6–3, 7–6
Winner	5.	10 June 2012	F2, Slovenia	Clay	(Australia) Alex Bolt	(Serbia) Miki Janković (Slovenia) Nik Razboršek	6–4, 7–6
Winner	6.	24 June 2012	F6, Germany	Clay	(Australia) Alex Bolt	(Germany) Jan-Lennard Struff (Germany) Mattis Wetzel	6–1, 6–0
Runner-up	7.	15 July 2012	F10, Great Britain	Grass	(Australia) Andrew Harris	(United Kingdom) Lewis Burton (United Kingdom) Edward Corrie	1–6, 1–6
Runner-up	8.	15 July 2012	F5, Australia	Hard	(Australia) Jay Andrijic	(Australia) Adam Feeney (Australia) Nick Lindahl	3–6, 5–7
Winner	9.	16 September 2012	F6 Australia	Hard	(Australia) Luke Saville	(Japan) Yuichi Ito (Japan) Yusuke Watanuki	6–3, 6–2
Winner	10.	14 October 2012	F10 Australia	Hard	(Australia) Luke Saville	(Australia) Matthew Barton (Australia) Michael Look	7–6, 7–6
Winner	11.	5 May 2013	F5, Greece	Hard	(United Kingdom) Joshua Milton	(Canada) Filip Peliwo (Canada) Hugo Di Feo	2–6, 6–3, 10–7
Winner	12.	15 September 2013	F6, Australia	Hard	(Australia) Alex Bolt	(Australia) Adam Feeney (Australia) Gavin van Peperzeel	6–1, 3–6, 10–7
Winner	13.	22 September 2013	F7, Australia	Hard	(Australia) Alex Bolt	(Japan) Kento Takeuchi (Australia) Isaac Frost	6–3, 6–2
Winner	14.	29 September 2013	F8, Australia	Hard	(Australia) Alex Bolt	(Australia) Adam Feeney (Australia) Gavin van Peperzeel	6–3, 6–3
Runner-up	15.	21 October 2013	Melbourne, Australia	Hard	(Australia) Alex Bolt	(Australia) Thanasi Kokkinakis (Australia) Benjamin Mitchell	3–6, 2–6
Winner	16.	1 December 2013	F1, Cambodia	Hard	(Australia) Gavin van Peperzeel	(Thailand) Wishaya Trongcharoenchaikul (Thailand) Danai Udomchoke	6–3, 3–6, 10–7
Winner	17.	3 May 2014	Anning, China	Clay	(Australia) Alex Bolt	(United Kingdom) Daniel Cox (China) Gong Maoxin	6–4, 6–3
Runner-up	18.	20 July 2014	F1, Estonia	Clay	(Finland) Micke Kontinen	(Lithuania) Lukas Mugevicius (Russia) Aleksandr Vasilenko	7–6, 3–6, 6–10
Winner	19.	27 July 2014	F2, Estonia	Clay	(Estonia) Markus Kerner	(Estonia) Vladamir Ivanov (Russia) Yan Sabanin	6–3, 6–3
Runner-up	20.	16 November 2014	F9, Australia	Hard	(United States) Mitchell Krueger	(Australia) Marc Polmans (Australia) Steven de Waard	6–7, 6–7
Runner-up	21.	11 January 2015	Onkaparinga, Australia	Hard	(Australia) Alex Bolt	(Ukraine) Aleksandr Nedovyesov (Russia) Andrey Kuznetsov	5–7, 4–6
Winner	22.	29 March 2015	F4, Australia	Hard	(Australia) Jordan Thompson	(Australia) Marc Polmans (Australia) Steven de Waard	6–2, 7–6
Runner-up	23.	3 May 2015	Anning, China	Clay	(India) Karunuday Singh	(China) Bai Yan (China) Wu Di	3–6, 4–6
Winner	24.	11 November 2015	Canberra International, Australia	Hard	(Australia) Alex Bolt	(United Kingdom) Brydan Klein (Australia) Dane Proppagia	7–6, 6–3
Winner	25.	28 February 2016	F1, Australia	Hard	(Australia) Alex Bolt	(Australia) Marc Polmans (New Zealand) José Statham	7–6, 6–3
Runner-up	26.	6 March 2016	F2, Australia	Hard	(Australia) Alex Bolt	(Australia) Marc Polmans (Australia) Steven de Waard	3–6, 7–6, 6–10
Winner	27.	13 March 2016	F3, Australia	Hard	(Australia) Greg Jones	(Australia) Gavin van Peperzeel (Australia) Bradley Mousley	6–3, 6–2
Winner	28.	29 May 2016	F1, Guam	Hard	(Japan) Toshihide Matsui	(Japan) Sho Katayama (Japan) Yutaro Matsuzaki	6–3, 3–6, 10–8
Winner	29.	5 June 2016	F6, Japan	Clay	(Japan) Yasutaka Uchiyama	(Japan) Katsuki Nagao (Japan) Hirosama Oku	7–6, 6–4
Runner-up	30.	11 February 2017	Launceston, Australia	Hard	(Australia) Alex Bolt	(Australia) Bradley Mousley (Australia) Luke Saville	1–6, 2–6
Runner-up	31	5 November 2017	Canberra International, Australia	Hard	(Australia) Luke Saville	(Australia) Alex Bolt (Australia) Bradley Mousley	3–6, 2–6
Winner	32	19 November 2017	Toyota, Japan	Hard (i)	(Australia) Max Purcell	(Philippines) Ruben Gonzales (Indonesia) Christopher Rungkat	6–3, 2–6, [10–8]
Winner	33	15 April 2018	Taipei, Taiwan	Hard (i)	(Australia) Matthew Ebden	(India) Prajnesh Gunneswaran (India) Saketh Myneni	6–4, 5–7, [10–6]

== Doubles performance timeline ==
Key
W	F	SF	QF	#R	RR	Q#	DNQ	A	NH

(W) winner; (F) finalist; (SF) semifinalist; (QF) quarterfinalist; (#R) rounds 4, 3, 2, 1; (RR) round-robin stage; (Q#) qualification round; (DNQ) did not qualify; (A) absent; (NH) not held; (SR) strike rate (events won / competed); (W–L) win–loss record.
To avoid confusion and double counting, these charts are updated at the conclusion of a tournament or when the player's participation has ended.

Current through 2018 Australian Open.

Tournament	2012	2013	2014	2015	2016	2017	2018	SR	W–L
Grand Slam tournaments
Australian Open	1R	A	QF	3R	1R	SF	1R	0 / 6	9–6
French Open	A	A	A	A	A	A	A	0 / 0	0–0
Wimbledon	A	A	1R	A	A	1R	A	0 / 2	0–2
US Open	A	A	A	A	A	A	A	0 / 0	0–0
Win–loss	0–1	0–0	3–2	2–1	0–1	4–2	0–1	0 / 8	9–8
Career statistics
Overall win–loss	0–1	0–0	3–2	2–1	0–1	6–3	0–1	11–9	
Year-end ranking	325	274	109	116	312	76	228		
