= Gimcheon Open ATP Challenger =

- 2018 Gimcheon Open ATP Challenger

Defunct tennis tournament
- Event name: Gimcheon Open ATP Challenger
- Location: Gimcheon, South Korea
- Venue: Gimcheon Sports Town Tennis Courts
- Category: ATP Challenger Tour
- Surface: Hard
- Draw: 32S/32Q/16D
- Prize money: $50,000

The Gimcheon Open ATP Challenger (formerly known as Adidas International Gimcheon for sponsorship reasons) was a tennis tournament held in Gimcheon, South Korea from 2014 until 2018. The event was part of the ATP Challenger Tour and was played on outdoor hard courts.

== Past finals ==
=== Singles ===
Year	Champion	Runner-up	Score
2018	(Japan) Yoshihito Nishioka	(Canada) Vasek Pospisil	6–4, 7–5
2017	(Italy) Thomas Fabbiano	(Russia) Teymuraz Gabashvili	7–5, 6–1
2016	(Australia) Max Purcell	(Australia) Andrew Whittington	3–6, 7–6^{(8–6)}, 5–1 ret.
2015	(United States) Alexander Sarkissian	(United States) Connor Smith	7–6^{(7–5)}, 6–4
2014	(Luxembourg) Gilles Müller	(Japan) Tatsuma Ito	7–6^{(7–5)}, 5–7, 6–4

=== Doubles ===
Year	Champion	Runner-up	Score
2018	(South Africa) Ruan Roelofse (Australia) John-Patrick Smith	(Thailand) Sanchai Ratiwatana (Thailand) Sonchat Ratiwatana	6–2, 6–3
2017	(Switzerland) Marco Chiudinelli (Russia) Teymuraz Gabashvili	(South Africa) Ruan Roelofse (Chinese Taipei) Yi Chu-huan	6–1, 6–3
2016	(Chinese Taipei) Hsieh Cheng-peng (Chinese Taipei) Yang Tsung-hua	(Colombia) Nicolás Barrientos (Philippines) Ruben Gonzales	Walkover
2015	(China) Li Zhe (New Zealand) Jose Rubin Statham	(South Africa) Dean O'Brien (South Africa) Ruan Roelofse	6–4, 6–1
2014	(Australia) Samuel Groth (Australia) Chris Guccione	(United States) Austin Krajicek (Australia) John-Patrick Smith	6–7^{(5–7)}, 7–5, [10–4]
