= Lee Duck-hee =

South Korean tennis player

- Full name: Lee Duck-hee
- Country (sports): South Korea
- Residence: Jecheon, South Korea
- Born: 29 May 1998 (age 28) Jecheon, South Korea
- Height: 1.70 m (5 ft 7 in)
- Turned pro: 2013
- Plays: Right-handed (two-handed backhand)
- Prize money: US $460,849

Singles
- Career record: 3–3
- Career titles: 0
- Highest ranking: No. 130 (10 April 2017)
- Current ranking: No. 1,492 (14 September 2026)

Grand Slam singles results
- Australian Open: Q3 (2017, 2018)
- French Open: Q3 (2018)
- Wimbledon: Q1 (2017, 2018)
- US Open: Q2 (2016, 2017)

Doubles
- Career record: 0–1
- Career titles: 0
- Highest ranking: No. 561 (27 May 2019)
- Current ranking: No. 988 (14 September 2026)
Medal record
Men's tennis
Representing South Korea
Asian Games
Bronze medal – third place	2018 Jakarta-Palembang	Singles
- Last updated on: 16 September 2026.

- Lee Duck-hee
- Hangul: 이덕희
- RR: I Deokhui
- MR: I Tŏkhŭi

Lee Duck-hee (Korean: 이덕희; born 29 May 1998) is a South Korean professional tennis player. He has a career-high ATP singles ranking of No. 130 achieved on 10 April 2017 and a doubles ranking of No. 561 achieved on 27 May 2019.

== Personal life ==
Lee was born deaf. On the tennis court, he can hear vibrations, but must rely on hand gestures to pick up line calls and the umpire. In 2015, his story was included during a campaign for the ANZ Bank, which was a sponsor for the Australian Open that year.

== Professional career ==
He turned pro in 2013. He played his first Challenger match at age 14. In August 2019 he became the first deaf player to compete in and win a match in the main draw of an ATP tournament with a win over Henri Laaksonen at the Winston-Salem Open.

== ATP Challenger Tour finals ==
=== Singles: 2 (2 runner-ups) ===
Legend ATP Challenger Tour (0–2)

Result	W–L	Date	Tournament	Tier	Surface	Opponent	Score
Loss	0–1	Sep 2016	Kaohsiung, Chinese Taipei	Challenger	Hard	(South Korea) Chung Hyeon	4–6, 2–6
Loss	0–2	Jun 2019	Little Rock, USA	Challenger	Hard	(Israel) Dudi Sela	1–6, 3–4 ret.

=== Doubles: 1 (1 runner-up) ===
Legend ATP Challenger Tour (0–1)

Result	W–L	Date	Tournament	Tier	Surface	Partner	Opponents	Score
Loss	0–1	Apr 2024	Gwangju, South Korea	Challenger	Hard	(China) Cui Jie	(South Korea) Lee Jea-moon (South Korea) Song Min-kyu	6–1, 1–6, [3-10]

== ITF Futures/World Tennis Tour finals ==
=== Singles: 18 (13 titles, 5 runner-ups) ===
Legend ITF Futures/WTT (13–5)	Finals by surface Hard (12–5) Clay (1–0) Grass (0–0) Carpet (0–0)

Result	W–L	Date	Tournament	Tier	Surface	Opponent	Score
Loss	0–1	Nov 2013	India F11, Raipur	Futures	Hard	(India) Ramkumar Ramanathan	6–3, 6–7^{(6–8)}, 4–6
Win	1–1	Jul 2014	Hong Kong F1, Hong Kong	Futures	Hard	(Thailand) Wishaya Trongcharoenchaikul	6–1, 6–4
Loss	1–2	Jul 2014	Hong Kong F2, Hong Kong	Futures	Hard	(South Africa) Ruan Roelofse	4–6, 6–3, 0–2 ret.
Win	2–2	Nov 2014	Cambodia F2, Phnom Penh	Futures	Hard	(Israel) Dekel Bar	7–6^{(7–3)}, 6–4
Win	3–2	Apr 2015	Indonesia F2, Tegal City	Futures	Hard	(Japan) Shuichi Sekiguchi	6–1, 3–0 ret.
Win	4–2	Apr 2015	Indonesia F3, Jakarta	Futures	Hard	(Indonesia) Christopher Rungkat	6–4, 6–3
Win	5–2	Jun 2015	Japan F6, Kashiwa	Futures	Hard	(Japan) Toshihide Matsui	6–4, 6–2
Win	6–2	Aug 2015	China F6, Putian	Futures	Hard	(China) Wu Di	6–2, 6–3
Win	7–2	Nov 2015	Thailand F8, Bangkok	Futures	Hard	(Latvia) Miķelis Lībietis	6–1, 6–4
Win	8–2	Mar 2016	Japan F3, Kōfu	Futures	Hard	(Japan) Yuya Kibi	6–2, 6–3
Loss	8–3	Apr 2016	China F4, Zhangjiagang	Futures	Hard	(Chinese Taipei) Jimmy Wang	5–7, 3–6
Win	9–3	Mar 2016	Japan F6, Karuizawa	Futures	Clay	(Japan) Yasutaka Uchiyama	7–6^{(7–5)}, 6–3
Win	10–3	Jul 2016	China F10, Longyan	Futures	Hard	(China) Li Zhe	6–4, 6–4
Win	11–3	Dec 2017	Indonesia F8, Jakarta	Futures	Hard	(India) Prajnesh Gunneswaran	6–3, 4–6, 7–6^{(8–6)}
Win	12–3	Dec 2019	M15 Nonthaburi, Thailand	WTT	Hard	(Japan) Shintaro Imai	6–1, 6-4
Win	13–3	Feb 2022	M15 Sharm El Sheikh, Egypt	WTT	Hard	(Israel) Ben Patael	6–2, 1–6, 7-5
Loss	13–4	Dec 2023	M15 Yanagawa, Japan	WTT	Hard	(South Korea) Sanhui Shin	3–6, 4–6
Loss	13–5	Mar 2024	M15 Nishitokyo, Japan	WTT	Hard	(Japan) Hikaru Shiraishi	4–6, 6–7^{(7–9)}

=== Doubles: 5 (5 runner-ups) ===
Legend ITF Futures/WTT (0–5)	Finals by surface Hard (0–5) Clay (0–0) Grass (0–0) Carpet (0–0)

Result	W–L	Date	Tournament	Tier	Surface	Partner	Opponents	Score
Loss	0–1	Jun 2013	Korea F6, Gimcheon	Futures	Hard	(South Korea) Chung Hyeon	(South Korea) Chung Hong (South Korea) Noh Sang-woo	1–6, 5–7
Loss	0–2	Apr 2014	Japan F4, Tsukuba	Futures	Hard	(New Zealand) Finn Tearney	(Japan) Sho Katayama (Japan) Bumpei Sato	4–6, 4–6
Loss	0–3	Jun 2015	Japan F6, Kashiwa	Futures	Hard	(South Korea) Woo Chung-hyo	(Japan) Yuya Kibi (Japan) Takuto Niki	0–6, 3–6
Loss	0–4	Jan 2023	M15 Jakarta, Indonesia	WTT	Hard	(Chinese Taipei) Huang Tsung-hao	(Indonesia) Nathan A. Barki (Indonesia) Christopher Rungkat	2–6, 4–6
Loss	0–5	May 2024	M25 Lu'an, China	WTT	Hard	(China) Cui Jie	(China) Sun Fajing (New Zealand) Ajeet Rai	2–6, 2–6
