= 2017 Kunal Patel San Francisco Open =

- Date: 6–12 February
- Edition: 1st
- Surface: Hard
- Location: San Francisco, United States

Champions

Singles
- (China) Zhang Ze

Doubles
- (Australia) Matt Reid / (Australia) John-Patrick Smith
Kunal Patel San Francisco Open	· 2018 →

The 2017 Kunal Patel San Francisco Open was a professional tennis tournament played on indoor hard courts. It was the first edition of the tournament and was a part of the 2017 ATP Challenger Tour. It took place in San Francisco, United States from February 6–12, 2017.

== Singles main-draw entrants ==
=== Seeds ===
Country	Player	Rank^{1}	Seed
USA	Frances Tiafoe	97	1
USA	Taylor Fritz	98	2
KAZ	Mikhail Kukushkin	99	3
USA	Jared Donaldson	100	4
SUI	Henri Laaksonen	127	5
CAN	Peter Polansky	128	6
CAN	Vasek Pospisil	133	7
USA	Denis Kudla	134	8

- ^{1} Rankings are as of January 30, 2017.

=== Other entrants ===
The following players received wildcards into the singles main draw:

- (United States) Marcos Giron
- (United States) Bradley Klahn
- (India) Ramkumar Ramanathan
- (United States) Ryan Shane

The following players received entry from the qualifying draw:

- (United States) Eric Quigley
- (United States) Raymond Sarmiento
- (Canada) Brayden Schnur
- (China) Zhang Ze

== Champions ==
=== Singles ===
- (China) Zhang Ze def. (Canada) Vasek Pospisil 7–5, 3–6, 6–2.

=== Doubles ===
- (Australia) Matt Reid / (Australia) John-Patrick Smith def. (China) Gong Maoxin / (China) Zhang Ze 6–7^{(4–7)}, 7–5, [10–7].
