= 2017 Kunal Patel San Francisco Open – Singles =

Singles
- 2017 Kunal Patel San Francisco Open

Final
- Champion: (China) Zhang Ze
- Runner-up: (Canada) Vasek Pospisil
- Score: 7–5, 3–6, 6–2

Events
Singles	Doubles
- Kunal Patel San Francisco Open

This was the first edition of the tournament.

Zhang Ze won the title after defeating Vasek Pospisil 7–5, 3–6, 6–2 in the final.

== Seeds ==
1. (United States) Frances Tiafoe (quarterfinals)
2. (United States) Taylor Fritz (first round)
3. (Kazakhstan) Mikhail Kukushkin (second round)
4. (United States) Jared Donaldson (first round)
5. (Switzerland) Henri Laaksonen (semifinals)
6. (Canada) Peter Polansky (second round)
7. (Canada) Vasek Pospisil (final)
8. (United States) Denis Kudla (quarterfinals)

== Draw ==
Key

- Q = Qualifier
- WC = Wild card
- LL = Lucky loser
- Alt = Alternate
- ITF = ITF entry
- PR = Protected ranking
- SR = Special ranking
- SE = Special exempt
- JE = Junior exempt
- JR = Junior Accelerator Programme entrant
- CO = College Accelerator Programme entrant
- NG = Next Gen Accelerator Program entrant
- w/o = Walkover
- r = Retired
- d = Defaulted

=== Finals ===
Semifinals
7	(Canada) Vasek Pospisil	6	6
(United States) Michael Mmoh	1	2
5	(Switzerland) Henri Laaksonen	4	6^{7}
Q	(China) Zhang Ze	6	7^{9}

Final
7	(Canada) Vasek Pospisil	5	6	2
Q	(China) Zhang Ze	7	3	6

=== Top half ===
First round
1	(United States) F Tiafoe	6	6
WC	(United States) B Klahn	4	4
WC	(United States) R Shane	7^{7}	6
(Italy) S Caruso	6^{3}	4
(United States) S Bangoura	3	4
(United States) R Opelka	6	6
(Argentina) M Trungelliti	6^{5}	6	4
7	(Canada) V Pospisil	7^{7}	3	6
3	(Kazakhstan) M Kukushkin	7^{7}	6
(Serbia) N Milojević	6^{3}	2
(United States) M Mmoh	2	6	7^{7}
(United States) T Sandgren	6	4	6^{1}
(United States) M McDonald	6	6
(Belgium) K Coppejans	2	2
Q	(United States) R Sarmiento	7^{9}	1	4
8	(United States) D Kudla	6^{7}	6	6

Second round
1	(United States) F Tiafoe	7^{7}	6^{4}	6
WC	(United States) R Shane	6^{4}	7^{7}	2
(United States) R Opelka	7^{7}	1	3
7	(Canada) V Pospisil	6^{5}	6	6
3	(Kazakhstan) M Kukushkin	3	3
(United States) M Mmoh	6	6
(United States) M McDonald	6^{5}	6	2
8	(United States) D Kudla	7^{7}	4	6

Quarterfinals
1	(United States) F Tiafoe	1	4
7	(Canada) V Pospisil	6	6
(United States) M Mmoh	2	6	6
8	(United States) D Kudla	6	3	4

Semifinals
7	(Canada) V Pospisil	6	6
(United States) M Mmoh	1	2

=== Bottom half ===
First round
5	(Switzerland) H Laaksonen	6	6
(Australia) M Barton	4	3
WC	(India) R Ramanathan	2	6	6
WC	(United States) M Giron	6	4	4
(United States) T Smyczek	3	6	5
Q	(United States) E Quigley	6	4	7
(Australia) J-P Smith	6	7^{7}
4	(United States) J Donaldson	3	6^{4}
6	(Canada) P Polansky	6	6
(United States) D Novikov	2	2
(Japan) T Ito	7^{7}	6
(Barbados) D King	6^{4}	2
(Sweden) E Ymer	6^{4}	4
Q	(Canada) B Schnur	7^{7}	6
Q	(China) Z Zhang	6	4	6
2	(United States) T Fritz	4	6	2

Second round
5	(Switzerland) H Laaksonen	6	7^{7}
WC	(India) R Ramanathan	1	6^{1}
Q	(United States) E Quigley	2	7	6
(Australia) J-P Smith	6	5	3
6	(Canada) P Polansky	6^{3}	6	4
(Japan) T Ito	7^{7}	3	6
Q	(Canada) B Schnur	4	2
Q	(China) Z Zhang	6	6

Quarterfinals
5	(Switzerland) H Laaksonen	7^{7}	6
Q	(United States) E Quigley	6^{4}	2
(Japan) T Ito	2	3
Q	(China) Z Zhang	6	6

Semifinals
5	(Switzerland) H Laaksonen	4	6^{7}
Q	(China) Z Zhang	6	7^{9}
