= 2017 Kunal Patel San Francisco Open – Doubles =

Doubles
- 2017 Kunal Patel San Francisco Open

Final
- Champions: (Australia) Matt Reid (Australia) John-Patrick Smith
- Runners-up: (China) Gong Maoxin (China) Zhang Ze
- Score: 6–7^{(4–7)}, 7–5, [10–7]

Events
| Singles | Doubles |
- Kunal Patel San Francisco Open

This was the first edition of the tournament.

Matt Reid and John-Patrick Smith won the title after defeating Gong Maoxin and Zhang Ze 6–7^{(4–7)}, 7–5, [10–7] in the final.

== Seeds ==
1. (Australia) Matt Reid / (Australia) John-Patrick Smith (champions)
2. (China) Gong Maoxin / (China) Zhang Ze (final)
3. (Ukraine) Denys Molchanov / (United States) Dennis Novikov (first round)
4. (United States) Sekou Bangoura / (Indonesia) Christopher Rungkat (semifinals)

== Draw ==
Key

- Q = Qualifier
- WC = Wild card
- LL = Lucky loser
- Alt = Alternate
- ITF = ITF entry
- PR = Protected ranking
- SR = Special ranking
- SE = Special exempt
- JE = Junior exempt
- JR = Junior Accelerator Programme entrant
- CO = College Accelerator Programme entrant
- NG = Next Gen Accelerator Program entrant
- w/o = Walkover
- r = Retired
- d = Defaulted

First round
WC | (United States) Andre Dome (United States) Max Ortiz | 2 | 4
(United States) B Klahn (United States) M Mmoh | 6 | 6
3 | (Ukraine) D Molchanov (United States) D Novikov | 6 | 6^{2} | [5]
(Belgium) K Coppejans (Barbados) D King | 2 | 7^{7} | [10]
WC | (United States) Michael Elortegui (United States) Q Vega | 3 | 4
(United States) A Lawson (United States) H Reese | 6 | 6
(Italy) S Caruso (Argentina) M Trungelliti | 6 | 1 | [13]
(United States) M McDonald (United States) T Sandgren | 4 | 6 | [11]
WC | (Hong Kong) S Butts (Hong Kong) Michael Kwong | 1 | 2
4 | (United States) S Bangoura (Indonesia) C Rungkat | 6 | 6
(Mexico) H Hach Verdugo (United States) E Quigley | 7^{10} | 3 | [10]
(Republic of Ireland) D O'Hare (United Kingdom) J Salisbury | 6^{8} | 6 | [7]

Quarterfinals
1 | (Australia) M Reid (Australia) J-P Smith | 6 | 6
(United States) B Klahn (United States) M Mmoh | 4 | 4
(Belgium) K Coppejans (Barbados) D King | 6^{4} | 7 | [6]
(United States) A Lawson (United States) H Reese | 7^{7} | 5 | [10]
(Italy) S Caruso (Argentina) M Trungelliti | 4 | 1
4 | (United States) S Bangoura (Indonesia) C Rungkat | 6 | 6
(Mexico) H Hach Verdugo (United States) E Quigley | 2 | 6 | [6]
2 | (China) M Gong (China) Z Zhang | 6 | 2 | [10]

Semifinals
1 | (Australia) M Reid (Australia) J-P Smith | 6 | 6
(United States) A Lawson (United States) H Reese | 2 | 4
4 | (United States) S Bangoura (Indonesia) C Rungkat | 3 | 6 | [6]
2 | (China) M Gong (China) Z Zhang | 6 | 3 | [10]

Final
1 | (Australia) M Reid (Australia) J-P Smith | 6^{4} | 7 | [10]
2 | (China) M Gong (China) Z Zhang | 7^{7} | 5 | [7]
