= 2018 Kunal Patel San Francisco Open – Singles =

Singles
- 2018 Kunal Patel San Francisco Open

Final
- Champion: (Chinese Taipei) Jason Jung
- Runner-up: (Germany) Dominik Köpfer
- Score: 6–4, 2–6, 7–6^{(7–5)}

Events
Singles	Doubles
- Kunal Patel San Francisco Open

Zhang Ze was the defending champion but chose not to defend his title.

Jason Jung won the title after defeating Dominik Köpfer 6–4, 2–6, 7–6^{(7–5)} in the final.

== Seeds ==
1. (Kazakhstan) Alexander Bublik (first round)
2. (United States) Mackenzie McDonald (second round)
3. (United States) Michael Mmoh (quarterfinals)
4. (United States) Denis Kudla (second round)
5. (United States) Bradley Klahn (quarterfinals)
6. (United States) Noah Rubin (quarterfinals)
7. (Canada) Filip Peliwo (quarterfinals)
8. (Canada) Brayden Schnur (first round)

== Draw ==
Key

- Q = Qualifier
- WC = Wild card
- LL = Lucky loser
- Alt = Alternate
- ITF = ITF entry
- PR = Protected ranking
- SR = Special ranking
- SE = Special exempt
- JE = Junior exempt
- JR = Junior Accelerator Programme entrant
- CO = College Accelerator Programme entrant
- NG = Next Gen Accelerator Program entrant
- w/o = Walkover
- r = Retired
- d = Defaulted

=== Finals ===
Semifinals
(United States) Dennis Novikov	3	1
(Germany) Dominik Köpfer	6	6
(Serbia) Miomir Kecmanović	6^{5}	6	2
(Chinese Taipei) Jason Jung	7^{7}	4	6

Final
(Germany) Dominik Köpfer	4	6	6^{5}
(Chinese Taipei) Jason Jung	6	2	7^{7}

=== Top half ===
First round
1	(Kazakhstan) A Bublik	6^{10}	6	2
(United States) D Novikov	7^{12}	3	6
Q	(Brazil) K Sell	6^{3}	6	3
(Colombia) DE Galán	7^{7}	3	6
WC	(United States) D Thomas	7^{7}	7^{7}
(Argentina) A Collarini	6^{4}	6^{4}
Q	(Argentina) M González	4	2
7	(Canada) F Peliwo	6	6
4	(United States) D Kudla	6	7^{7}
(Croatia) A Pavić	4	6^{4}
(Germany) D Köpfer	6	6
(Czech Republic) J Šátral	2	2
(United States) M Krueger	6	6
(Portugal) G Oliveira	3	4
(El Salvador) M Arévalo	6^{1}	3
5	(United States) B Klahn	7^{7}	6

Second round
(United States) D Novikov	5	6	6
(Colombia) DE Galán	7	3	4
WC	(United States) D Thomas	3	2
7	(Canada) F Peliwo	6	6
4	(United States) D Kudla	6^{3}	3
(Germany) D Köpfer	7^{7}	6
(United States) M Krueger	7^{7}	4	4
5	(United States) B Klahn	6^{4}	6	6

Quarterfinals
(United States) D Novikov	7	7
7	(Canada) F Peliwo	5	5
(Germany) D Köpfer	6	7^{8}
5	(United States) B Klahn	2	6^{6}

Semifinals
(United States) D Novikov	3	1
(Germany) D Köpfer	6	6

=== Bottom half ===
First round
8	(Canada) B Schnur	4	6^{2}
(Serbia) M Kecmanović	6	7^{7}
Q	(United States) JC Aragone	6	4	7^{7}
(United States) M Giron	4	6	6^{5}
WC	(United States) C Eubanks	7^{7}	4
(Russia) E Karlovskiy	6^{4}	3^{r}
WC	(Chile) C Garín	2	3
3	(United States) M Mmoh	6	6
6	(United States) N Rubin	6	3
(Dominican Republic) J Hernández-Fernández	1	0^{r}
Q	(United States) Jared Hiltzik	7^{7}	4	6
(Japan) K Uchida	6^{3}	6	3
(Spain) Í Cervantes	2	0
(Chinese Taipei) J Jung	6	6
WC	(France) F Lakat	4	4
2	(United States) M McDonald	6	6

Second round
(Serbia) M Kecmanović	6	7^{8}
Q	(United States) JC Aragone	4	6^{6}
WC	(United States) C Eubanks	4	4
3	(United States) M Mmoh	6	6
6	(United States) N Rubin	6	6
Q	(United States) J Hiltzik	1	4
(Chinese Taipei) J Jung	1	7^{7}	6
2	(United States) M McDonald	6	6^{3}	2

Quarterfinals
(Serbia) M Kecmanović	7^{7}	6^{4}	6
3	(United States) M Mmoh	6^{3}	7^{7}	1
6	(United States) N Rubin	3	1
(Chinese Taipei) J Jung	6	6

Semifinals
(Serbia) M Kecmanović	6^{5}	6	2
(Chinese Taipei) J Jung	7^{7}	4	6
