= 2018 Kunal Patel San Francisco Open =

- Date: 5–11 February
- Edition: 2nd
- Surface: Hard
- Location: San Francisco, United States

Champions

Singles
- (Chinese Taipei) Jason Jung

Doubles
- (El Salvador) Marcelo Arévalo / (Venezuela) Roberto Maytín
- Kunal Patel San Francisco Open

The 2018 Kunal Patel San Francisco Open was a professional tennis tournament played on indoor hard courts. It was the second edition of the tournament and was a part of the 2018 ATP Challenger Tour. It took place in San Francisco, United States from February 5–11, 2018.

== Singles main-draw entrants ==
=== Seeds ===
Country	Player	Rank^{1}	Seed
KAZ	Alexander Bublik	131	1
USA	Mackenzie McDonald	158	2
USA	Michael Mmoh	164	3
USA	Denis Kudla	167	4
USA	Bradley Klahn	175	5
USA	Noah Rubin	180	6
CAN	Filip Peliwo	186	7
CAN	Brayden Schnur	192	8

- ^{1} Rankings are as of January 29, 2018.

=== Other entrants ===
The following players received wildcards into the singles main draw:

- (United States) Christopher Eubanks
- (Chile) Christian Garín
- (France) Florian Lakat
- (United States) Danny Thomas

The following players received entry from the qualifying draw:

- (United States) JC Aragone
- (Argentina) Máximo González
- (United States) Jared Hiltzik
- (Brazil) Karue Sell

== Champions ==
=== Singles ===
- (Chinese Taipei) Jason Jung def. (Germany) Dominik Köpfer 6–4, 2–6, 7–6^{(7–5)}.

=== Doubles ===
- (El Salvador) Marcelo Arévalo / (Venezuela) Roberto Maytín def. (United Kingdom) Luke Bambridge / (United Kingdom) Joe Salisbury 6–3, 6–7^{(5–7)}, [10–7].
