= 2018 Kunal Patel San Francisco Open – Doubles =

Doubles
- 2018 Kunal Patel San Francisco Open

Final
- Champions: (El Salvador) Marcelo Arévalo (Venezuela) Roberto Maytín
- Runners-up: (United Kingdom) Luke Bambridge (United Kingdom) Joe Salisbury
- Score: 6–3, 6–7^{(5–7)}, [10–7]

Events
Singles	Doubles
- Kunal Patel San Francisco Open

Matt Reid and John-Patrick Smith were the defending champions but chose not to defend their title.

Marcelo Arévalo and Roberto Maytín won the title after defeating Luke Bambridge and Joe Salisbury 6–3, 6–7^{(5–7)}, [10–7] in the final.

== Seeds ==
1. (Uruguay) Ariel Behar / (Argentina) Máximo González (semifinals)
2. (United Kingdom) Luke Bambridge / (United Kingdom) Joe Salisbury (final)
3. (India) Jeevan Nedunchezhiyan / (Indonesia) Christopher Rungkat (semifinals)
4. (El Salvador) Marcelo Arévalo / (Venezuela) Roberto Maytín (champions)

== Draw ==
Key

- Q = Qualifier
- WC = Wild card
- LL = Lucky loser
- Alt = Alternate
- ITF = ITF entry
- PR = Protected ranking
- SR = Special ranking
- SE = Special exempt
- JE = Junior exempt
- JR = Junior Accelerator Programme entrant
- CO = College Accelerator Programme entrant
- NG = Next Gen Accelerator Program entrant
- w/o = Walkover
- r = Retired
- d = Defaulted

First round
1	(Uruguay) A Behar (Argentina) M González	7^{7}	7
(Mexico) H Hach Verdugo (Croatia) A Pavić	6^{2}	5
(Argentina) F Agamenone (Venezuela) LD Martínez	6^{4}	6	[6]
(United States) R Galloway (United States) M Krueger	7^{7}	4	[10]
4	(El Salvador) M Arévalo (Venezuela) R Maytín	6	5	[10]
WC	(United States) Nicholas Brunner (United States) Andre Dome	3	7	[5]
LL	(United States) JC Aragone (United States) C Eubanks	7^{7}	2	[10]
Q	(Spain) Í Cervantes (United States) JP Fruttero	6^{5}	6	[6]
WC	(United States) Alex Brenner (United States) N Chappell	2	1
(United States) D Novikov (Portugal) G Oliveira	6	6
WC	(Sweden) A Göransson (France) F Lakat	4	6	[7]
3	(India) J Nedunchezhiyan (Indonesia) C Rungkat	6	4	[10]
(Portugal) B Saraiva (Netherlands) S Verbeek	6	6
(Kazakhstan) A Bublik (United States) M Mmoh	0	2
(Philippines) R Gonzales (United States) H Reese	7	6^{3}	[8]
2	(United Kingdom) L Bambridge (United Kingdom) J Salisbury	5	7^{7}	[10]

Quarterfinals
1	(Uruguay) A Behar (Argentina) M González	7	6
(United States) R Galloway (United States) M Krueger	5	4
4	(El Salvador) M Arévalo (Venezuela) R Maytín	w/o
LL	(United States) JC Aragone (United States) C Eubanks
(United States) D Novikov (Portugal) G Oliveira	6	1	[9]
3	(India) J Nedunchezhiyan (Indonesia) C Rungkat	4	6	[11]
(Portugal) B Saraiva (Netherlands) S Verbeek	3	4
2	(United Kingdom) L Bambridge (United Kingdom) J Salisbury	6	6

Semifinals
1	(Uruguay) A Behar (Argentina) M González	1	6^{3}
4	(El Salvador) M Arévalo (Venezuela) R Maytín	6	7^{7}
3	(India) J Nedunchezhiyan (Indonesia) C Rungkat	2	2
2	(United Kingdom) L Bambridge (United Kingdom) J Salisbury	6	6

Final
4	(El Salvador) M Arévalo (Venezuela) R Maytín	6	6^{5}	[10]
2	(United Kingdom) L Bambridge (United Kingdom) J Salisbury	3	7^{7}	[7]
