= Kunal Patel San Francisco Open =

Tournament information
- Event name: Kunal Patel San Francisco Open
- Location: San Francisco, United States
- Venue: Lisa and Douglas Goldman Tennis Center
- Category: USTA Level 4 Open
- Surface: Hard
- Prize money: $50,000
- Website: kpsfopen.org

The Kunal Patel San Francisco Open is a tennis tournament held annually in San Francisco. It was previously part of the ATP Challenger Tour. The inaugural event was held February 2017, at the Bay Club SF Tennis Center, the West Coast's largest indoor tennis facility. Since 2021, the tournament has been held at the Lisa and Douglas Goldman Tennis Center in San Francisco, CA.

== Past finals ==
=== Men's Singles ===
Year	Champion	Runner-up	Score
2017	(China) Zhang Ze	(Canada) Vasek Pospisil	7–5, 3–6, 6–2
2018	(Chinese Taipei) Jason Jung	(Germany) Dominik Köpfer	6–4, 2–6, 7–6^{(7–5)}
2019	(United States) Steve Johnson	(United States) Stefan Kozlov	
2021	(United States) Raymond Sarmiento	(Belarus) Dzianis Zharyn	
2022	(United States) Govind Nanda	(Japan) Yuta Kikuchi	
2023	(Russia) Semen Pankin	(United Kingdom) Tiffany William	
2024	(Denmark) Carl Emil Overbeck	(Russia) Kristina Liutova	
2025	(United States) Theodore Dean	(Russia) Kristina Liutova	
2026	(United States) Govind Nanda	(United States) Theodore Dean	

=== Doubles ===
Year	Champions	Runners-up	Score
2017	(Australia) Matt Reid (Australia) John-Patrick Smith	(China) Gong Maoxin (China) Zhang Ze	6–7^{(4–7)}, 7–5, [10–7]
2018	(El Salvador) Marcelo Arévalo (Venezuela) Roberto Maytín	(United Kingdom) Luke Bambridge (United Kingdom) Joe Salisbury	6–3, 6–7^{(5–7)}, [10–7]
