= Skyler Butts =

Hong Kong tennis player

- Country (sports): Hong Kong
- Residence: Santa Ana, California, United States
- Born: 18 September 1993 (age 31); Ocala, Florida, United States
- Height: 1.78 m (5 ft 10 in)
- Plays: Right-handed (one-handed backhand)
- Prize money: $4,678

Singles
- Career record: 1–0 (at ATP Tour level, Grand Slam level, and in Davis Cup)
- Career titles: 0
- Highest ranking: No. 1147 (27 November 2017)
- Current ranking: No. 1221 (29 January 2018)

Doubles
- Career record: 0–0 (at ATP Tour level, Grand Slam level, and in Davis Cup)
- Career titles: 0
- Highest ranking: No. 1375 (27 November 2017)
- Current ranking: No. 1392 (29 January 2018)
- Last updated on: 4 February 2018.

Skyler Butts (born 18 September 1993) is a Hong Kong tennis player.

Butts has a career high ATP singles ranking of 1147 achieved on 27 November 2017. He also has a career high ATP doubles ranking of 1375 achieved on 27 November 2017.

Butts represents Hong Kong at the Davis Cup, where he has a W/L record of 1–0.
