= Vasek Pospisil =

Canadian tennis player (born 1990)

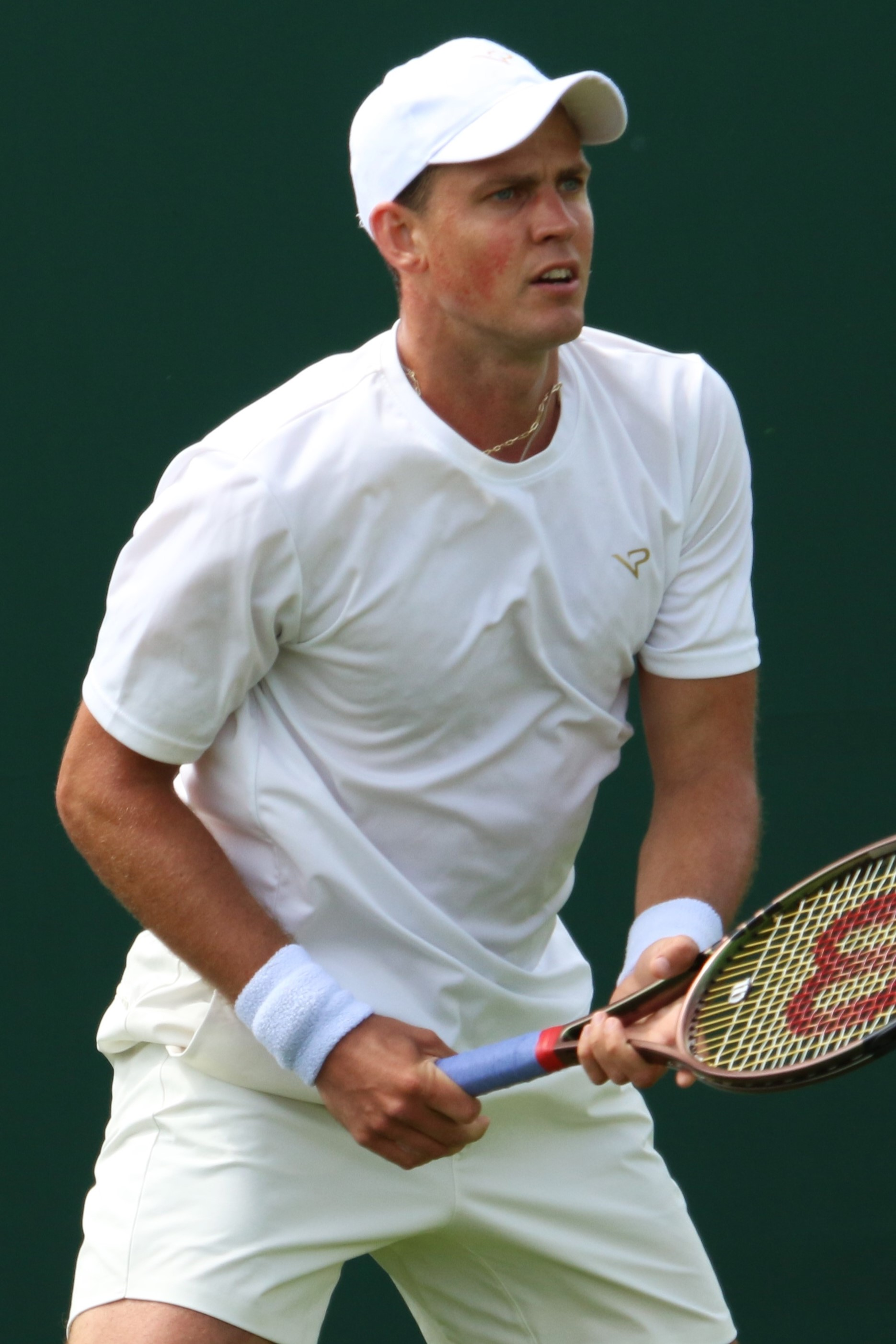
- Pospisil at the 2023 Wimbledon Championships
- Full name: Vaclav Pospisil
- Country (sports): Canada
- Residence: Freeport, Bahamas
- Born: June 23, 1990 (age 36) Vernon, British Columbia, Canada
- Height: 1.94 m (6 ft 4 in)
- Turned pro: 2007
- Retired: July 27, 2025
- Plays: Right-handed (two-handed backhand)
- Coach: Malek Jaziri
- Prize money: US$7,141,194

Singles
- Career record: 136–176
- Career titles: 0
- Highest ranking: No. 25 (27 January 2014)

Grand Slam singles results
- Australian Open: 3R (2014, 2015)
- French Open: 1R (2012, 2013, 2014, 2015, 2016, 2018, 2020)
- Wimbledon: QF (2015)
- US Open: 4R (2020)

Other tournaments
- Olympic Games: 1R (2012, 2016)

Doubles
- Career record: 119–91
- Career titles: 7
- Highest ranking: No. 4 (27 April 2015)

Grand Slam doubles results
- Australian Open: QF (2016)
- French Open: QF (2015)
- Wimbledon: W (2014)
- US Open: 3R (2013, 2014)

Other doubles tournaments
- Olympic Games: SF – 4th (2016)

Team competitions
- Davis Cup: W (2022); Record: 27–24
- Hopman Cup: RR (2015, 2018)

Vasek Pospisil (/ˈvæʃɪk ˈpɒspɪsɪl/ VASH-ik POS-pih-sil; Czech: Vašek Pospíšil, pronounced [ˈvaʃɛk ˈpospiːʃɪl]; (Note: Czech: Václav "Vašek" Pospíšil [ˈvaːtslaf ˈvaʃɛk ˈpospiːʃɪl]) born June 23, 1990) is a Canadian former professional tennis player. Pospisil has a career-high singles ranking of world No. 25, and No. 4 in doubles. Along with partner Jack Sock, he won the 2014 Wimbledon Championships and the 2015 Indian Wells Masters men's doubles titles. He also reached the quarterfinals in singles at the 2015 Wimbledon Championships.

== Early life and career ==
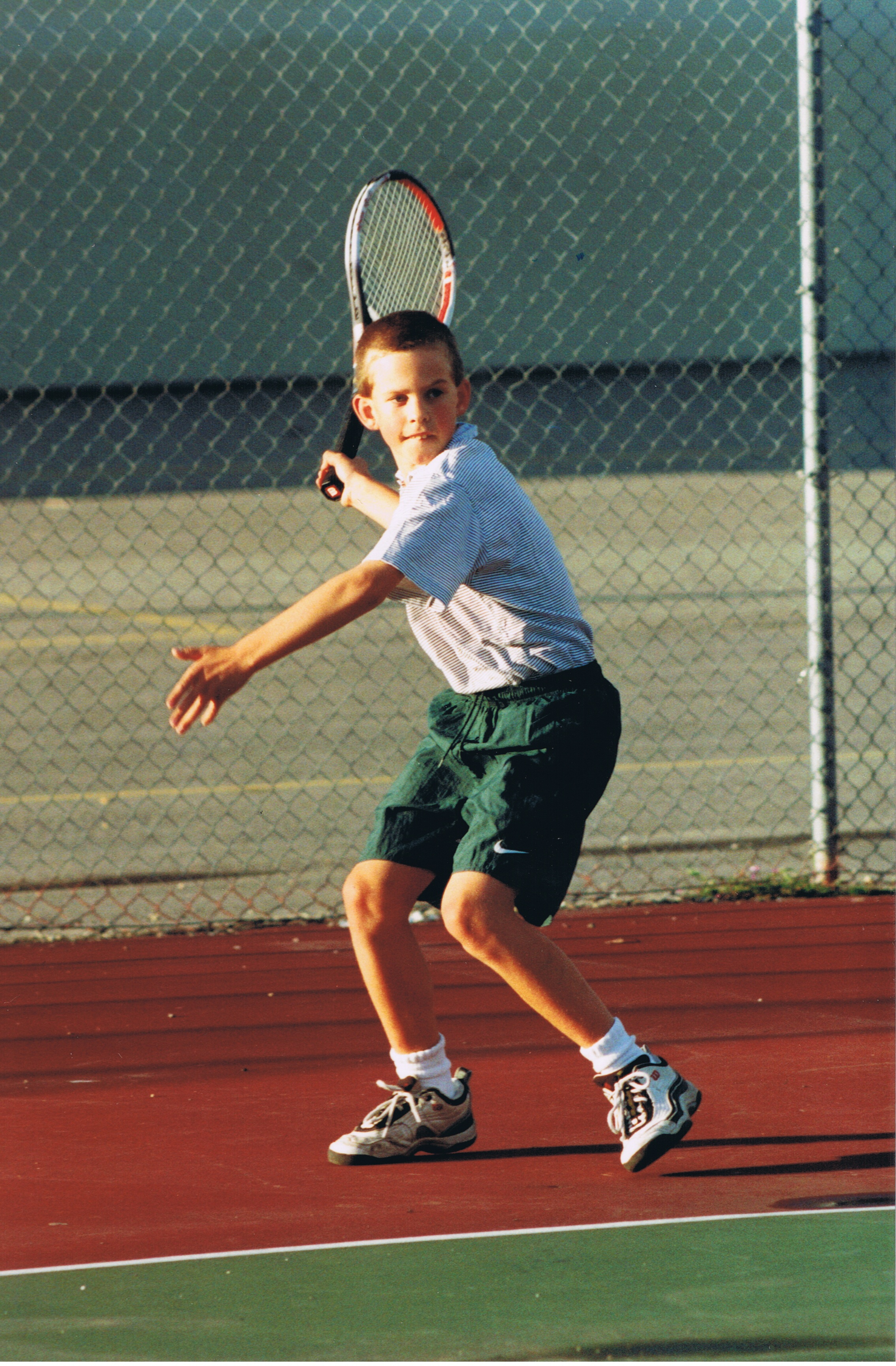
A young Pospisil training on his home court in Vernon, British Columbia

Vasek was born on June 23, 1990, in Vernon, British Columbia, to Miloš and Mila. In 1988, before Vasek was born, his parents and older brothers unlawfully drove from Czechoslovakia to Austria to escape the Communist regime. Before moving, Miloš worked as the plant manager of a dairy factory, and Mila taught in a kindergarten. Both had experience playing recreational sports such as tennis with their sons and in local tournaments.

The family lived in northeastern Austria and saved up to move to Canada despite working long hours for low wages. In the summer of 1989, they finally moved to Vernon, British Columbia, a city in the Okanagan Valley, because Miloš's brother was living there after escaping his home country in the years prior. It had a population of only about 38,000. The entire family had a meager understanding of the English language upon their arrival. Miloš worked two jobs, at a flour mill and as a machinery operator at a brewery. He began taking more interest in the game of tennis after the birth of his third son. He coached Vasek's older brothers on community tennis courts, recorded matches on television, and found tips and guidelines in tennis magazines. When Vasek was about 3 years old, he started acting as his brothers' ball boy when they practiced with their father. He also would "drag a mini tennis racquet all over the house."

Vasek played his first tournament at age 6, competing at the under-12 level and still emerging as the champion. Approximately three years later, he participated at the under-9 Little Mo Nationals in San Diego. These victories made Miloš even more enthusiastic about his son's tennis career. As soon as Vasek's brothers reached high school and had played in several tournaments, he was given his first proper lessons. Along with tennis, he also played soccer, basketball, table tennis, and street hockey. Vasek quit soccer when he was only 12 due to injuries and because it got in the way of tennis. He said, "In some ways my heart was broken because I often times had more desire to play soccer than tennis." Pospisil frequently traveled to Kelowna—a 45-minute drive—in the winter so that he could play indoors. He made the trip nearly every day for six consecutive years. In the summer, on the other hand, he had to play with his brothers on the poorly maintained courts of a nearby high school and occasionally took taunts from the students there.

In the fall of 2002, the family had to move to Vancouver so that they could find a tennis coach for their youngest son. They had to leave Miloš behind, as he had to stay in Vernon to work at his brewery, but he would make the four-hour drive on weekends to see them. The decision was also made because Vasek's oldest brother, Tom, was already attending the University of British Columbia (UBC) in Vancouver, and Petr was hoping to start going to the same school. Unlike his siblings, Vasek had been homeschooled since he was 7 years old to prioritize tennis. He said, "I miss my friends a lot [from school] but the home schooling is better. I can do my work almost twice as fast. We thought it would be better to train here. It's a really good club." Vasek was coached by Russian-born Vadim Korkh, who had experience working with players such as Andrei Chesnokov while he was a professor of tennis at the Central Sport Academy in Moscow. Korkh said of Pospisil, "With his dedication and talent there was no question he would succeed. He's a great example for all my students. They all ask about Vasek and I tell them how much dedication he had and I show them his [youth tennis] schedule and they see how hard he worked." Under Korkh, Vasek studied for school and did fitness training as well as practicing tennis. He played with Korkh five days each week, each practice lasting four hours. In November 2002, Vasek went to Florida and won the Prince Cup, defeating several of the best under-12 players from Europe. He also reached the quarterfinals of the Orange Bowl. At the Ellensburg (WA) Open in 2003, Vasek lost a tight 3-setter to Seattle-area phenom Jeffrey Hammond.

Pospisil traveled to play under-14 tournaments in Europe for Tennis Canada in the spring of 2003 with three other players. Being younger than most of the players there, he was quickly defeated by his opponents in the early rounds of the main and consolation draws. He faced a knee injury in the process, something that would trouble him for the 18 months that followed. Pospisil would make the same trip as an older player, but would still see little success. In 2004, he won the Canadian Nationals at the U14 level, securing his spot as the best player in the country for his age group. When Vasek was 14 years old, his father decided to return to coaching his son. Miloš left his brewery, moved to Vancouver, and became Vasek's full-time coach, training him at local high school courts once again.

== Junior career ==
Initially playing USTA at the age of 7, Vasek won his first 12-and-under tournament. He continued to beat high-ranked and respected players such as Ryan Farber. Pospisil reached the doubles final of his first junior International Tennis Federation event, the 2005 Canadian U18 ITF World Ranking event, with compatriot Graeme Kassautzki. He and Kassautzki won the doubles event. Partnering another star junior Canadian, Milos Raonic, Pospisil won his second doubles title in December 2006, the Prince Cup in the United States. He also won back-to-back doubles titles in the Czech Republic in January and February 2007, as well as the Guru Cup in Italy in May.

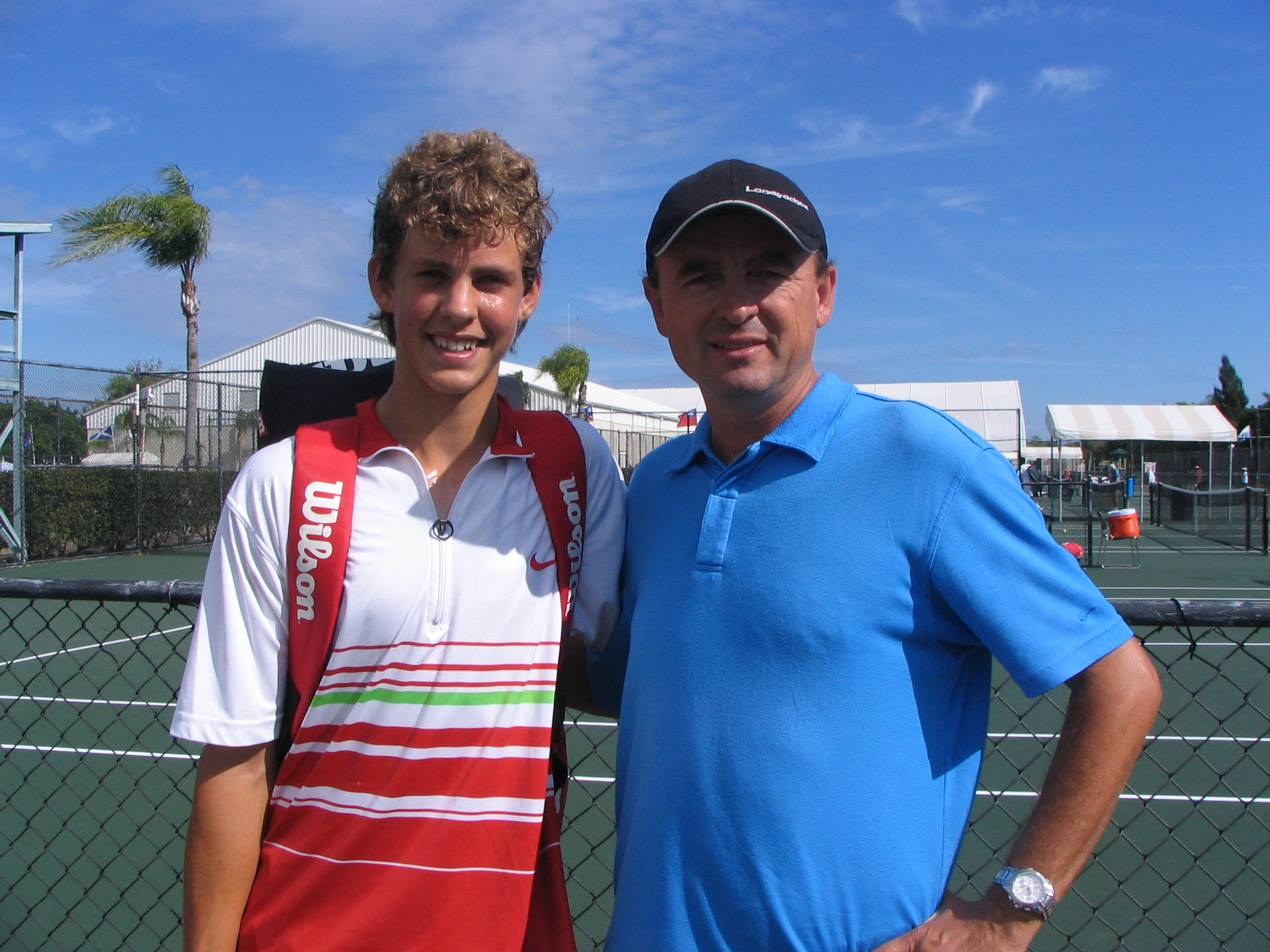
Vasek (age 15) with his father and coach, Miloš Pospíšil, in Bradenton Florida 2005

In singles, Pospisil won the ITF Flevoland Junior Championships in the Netherlands in February, the 25th All-Canadian ITF Junior Championships in April, and the Canadian U18 ITF World Ranking Event, the last one without losing more than four games in any set.

Pospisil won two more European events that summer in doubles and was finalist three more times. He capped his summer off by reaching the 2007 U.S. Open boys' doubles final, partnering Grigor Dimitrov. The pair lost to Jonathan Eysseric and Jérôme Inzerillo. In December, he and partner Roman Jebavý won the doubles event at the prestigious Dunlop Orange Bowl.

Junior Grand Slam results – Singles:

Australian Open: 1R (2008)
French Open: 2R (2008)
Wimbledon: 1R (2008)
US Open: 2R (2007)

Junior Grand Slam results – Doubles:

Australian Open: F (2008)
French Open: SF (2008)
Wimbledon: 2R (2008)
US Open: F (2007)

== Pro career ==
=== 2007–10: Early professional years ===
In March 2007, Pospisil won his first professional tour tournament singles match, at the Canada F1 Futures event, defeating Guatemalan No. 1 Christian Paiz. In the second round, he lost to compatriot Rob Steckley in straight sets. Two weeks later at the Canada F3, he captured his first career title, in doubles, partnering compatriot Érik Chvojka. In June 2007, he and Chvojka lost in the first round of the UniCredit Czech Open, which was Pospisil's first ATP Challenger event.

In November 2008, he won the Challenger Banque Nationale de Rimouski doubles title with compatriot Milos Raonic and two more ITF Futures doubles titles.

In May 2009, Pospisil and partner Adil Shamasdin won the Mexico F4 and F5 doubles titles, as the tournament top seeds. In July 2009 at the USA F17 in Peoria, Illinois, Pospisil reached his first professional singles final, losing to Michael Venus. In doubles, he and Raonic, again the top seeds, won the title, defeating Matt Reid and Dennis Zivkovic in the finals. In August 2009, Pospisil lost in singles in the first round of qualifying for the Rogers Cup to fifth seed Jan Hernych. The following week, he and partner Marius Copil, the top seeds, took the title of the Romania F14 without dropping a set. In September 2009 at the Italy F28, he and partner Marcus Willis, the top seeds, took the title. The following week, Vasek captured the singles title of Italy F29, his first singles title, defeating third seed Francesco Piccari in the final. Two weeks later, Pospisil was in top form, capturing his second title in singles in as many tournaments, Italy F30, and without dropping a set or even reaching a tie-break. He was the seventh seed, and in the final he beat second seed Matteo Viola. After being off for three weeks, Pospisil, as second seed in singles, won Mexico F12, again without dropping a set. In doubles, he and partner Nima Roshan of Australia, the third seeds, also took the tournament title. The following week, Vasek won Mexico F14 as third seed in singles, saving his best tennis for the latter rounds, as he defeated sixth seed Daniel Garza in the semifinals and fifth seed César Ramírez in the final. This was Pospisil's fourth consecutive title and third without dropping a set. Two weeks later, Pospisil, the top seed, lost at Mexico F15 in the semifinals. This loss snapped his 23-match winning streak. After a week off, Pospisil and his partner Adil Shamasdin won the doubles title at the Challenger Britania Zavaleta.

In mid-March 2010, Pospisil was the top seed in singles at the Canada F3 in Sherbrooke. He lost only one set in capturing his fifth ITF tour title, defeating Raonic, the second seed, in the final, in three sets. In the second week of April 2010, Pospisil won the doubles title of the Abierto Internacional del Bicentenario Leon, partnering Santiago González as the top-seeded pair. In August 2010, Pospisil lost in the first round of qualifying for the Rogers Cup to eventual qualifier Illya Marchenko. He played doubles in the main draw as a wild card, partnering Raonic. Together, in the first round, they became, and remain, the only team to ever defeat the doubles team of Rafael Nadal and Novak Djokovic. This was his first win in an ATP Tour main draw event. After two weeks off, he, as the tournament top seed, took the singles title at the ITF Mexico F6, defeating fifth seed David Rice in the final. Pospisil won a second consecutive singles title, Mexico F7, by defeating second seed Adam El Mihdawy in the final. In October 2010, Pospisil again was the top seed in singles at Canada F5 in Markham, Ontario and captured the title, defeating fifth seed Nicholas Monroe in the final. It was the eighth Futures singles title of his career.

=== 2011–12: First Olympic experience ===
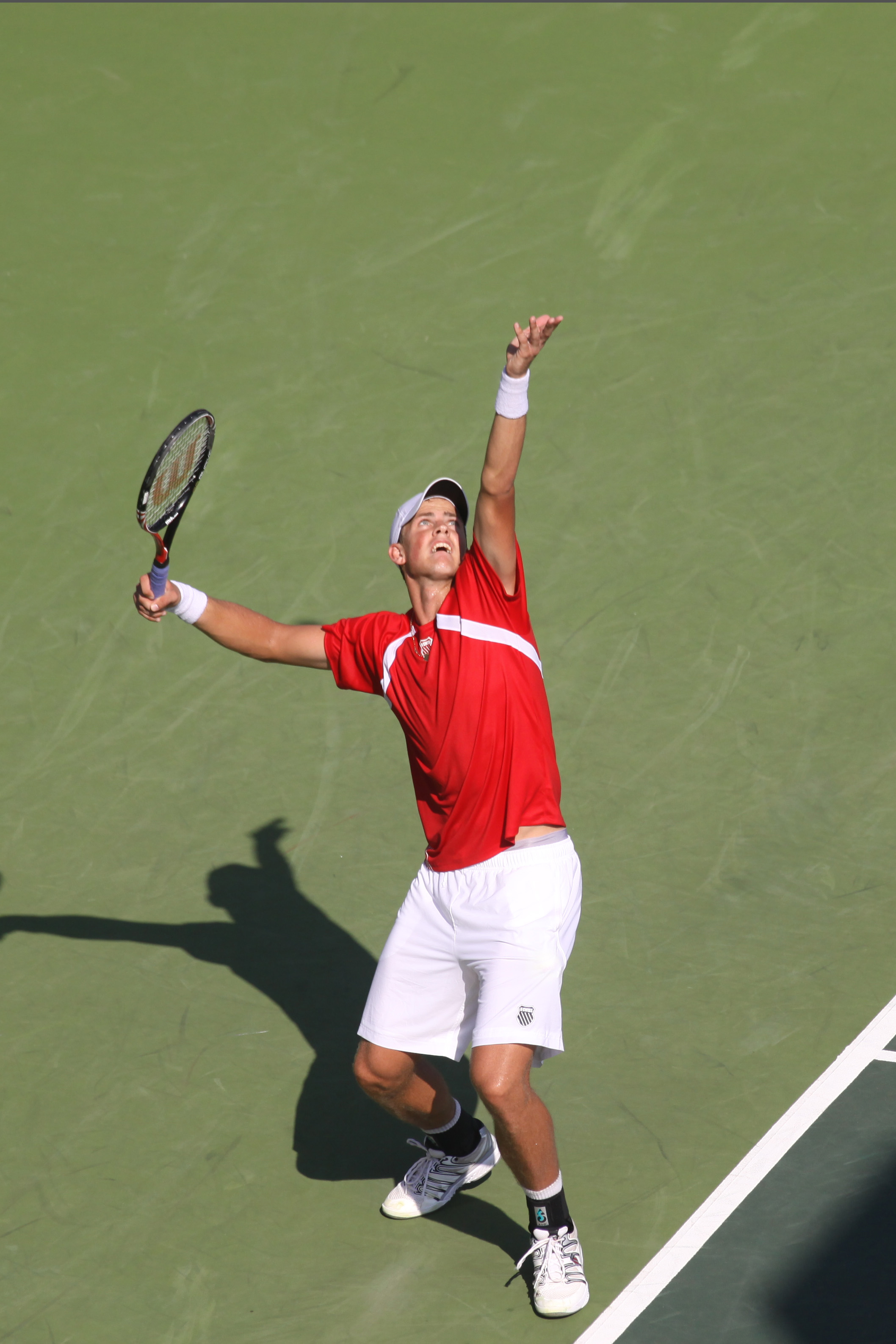
Pospisil serving in his match against Dudi Sela at the 2011 Davis Cup World Group play-offs

At the midway point of 2011, Pospisil captured three Challenger doubles titles and two Futures titles, including one in singles. In March at the Rimouski Challenger, he won the doubles title partnering Treat Conrad Huey. Two weeks later, Pospisil captured the doubles title of USA F8 partnering Nicholas Monroe. Two weeks later, in April, he won his third straight doubles title, the 2011 Tallahassee Tennis Challenger playing with Bobby Reynolds. In May 2011, Pospisil won his ninth career ITF Futures singles title, Korea F2. In June 2011 at Wimbledon, attempting to qualify for a Grand Slam tournament for the first time, Pospisil lost in the second round. The following week, he teamed with Reynolds, as the second seeds, to capture the title of the Jalisco Open. In September 2011, Pospisil was instrumental in seeing the Canadian Davis Cup team come back from two rubbers down to win a Davis Cup tie, for the first time. The win allowed the team to face Israel, in September, in a World Group play-off. Missing through injury their two top singles players, Milos Raonic and Frank Dancevic, Pospisil played No. 1 singles and doubles. He lost his first rubber in four sets, to Iván Endara. With fellow British Columbian Philip Bester also losing, Pospisil and veteran doubles specialist Daniel Nestor had to win their doubles match to keep the tie alive, and did, in three close sets. Perhaps buoyed by this win, Pospisil looked like a new player in beating Julio César Campozano comfortably. Bester then won the tie-deciding rubber, also in straight sets. In July 2011, Pospisil won his tenth ITF Men's Circuit singles title in Saskatoon, without dropping a set. In August 2011, Pospisil upset world No. 22 Juan Ignacio Chela in the first round of the 2011 Rogers Cup, but lost in the second round to third seed Roger Federer. In doubles, he and partner Adil Shamasdin lost in the first round. He also reached the second round of the 2011 US Open where he was defeated by Feliciano López.

In January 2012, Pospisil qualified for the Aircel Chennai Open and lost in the first round of the main draw to Andreas Beck. He won his first ATP Challenger title in March 2012, defeating Maxime Authom. After this win, he entered the world's top 100 for the first time. His second Challenger title (Granby, Canada) followed in July 2012, lifting Pospisil to world No. 85. At the 2012 Summer Olympics, he lost to David Ferrer in the first round of singles play and reached the second round in doubles with Daniel Nestor. He reached the second round of the 2012 Rogers Cup for the second straight year after upsetting world No. 26 Andreas Seppi. He lost to world No. 10 Juan Mónaco in the next round.

=== 2013: Breakthrough ===
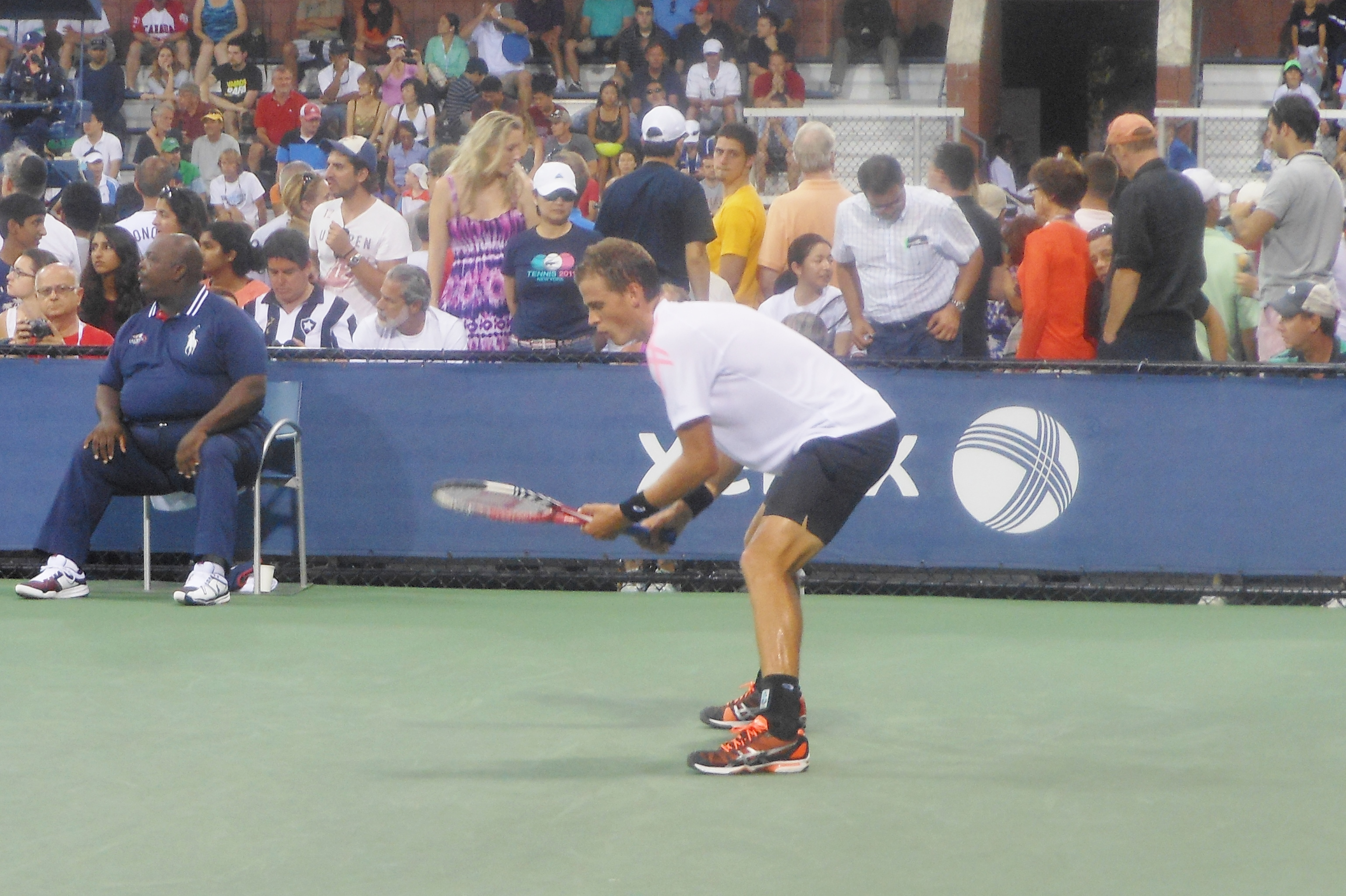
Pospisil at the 2013 US Open

Pospisil had to skip all tournaments in early 2013, including the Australian Open, due to mononucleosis. After recovery, he contributed to Canada's Davis Cup success by winning the doubles match against Italy with Daniel Nestor in April. At the beginning of May, he won his third ATP Challenger singles title and biggest to date when Michał Przysiężny retired in the third set in Johannesburg. Pospisil reached his first ATP semifinal in July at the Claro Open Colombia in Bogotá, but lost to local Alejandro Falla. At the beginning of August, Pospisil won his second ATP Challenger of the year at the Odlum Brown Vancouver Open, where he defeated Daniel Evans in the final.

He entered the Rogers Cup in Montréal as a wild card. In the first round against world No. 20 John Isner, he lost the first set, 5–7, but then won two tiebreaks to take the match. He followed this with a straight-set victory over Radek Štěpánek, and then surprised world No. 6 Tomáš Berdych by upsetting him 7–6^{(7–5)} in the third-set tiebreaker to reach the quarterfinals. This was Pospisil's first top-10 win. In the quarterfinals leading 3–0 in the first set, Pospisil's opponent Nikolay Davydenko retired due to illness, thus making Pospisil a semifinalist. In the semifinals, he lost to compatriot Milos Raonic after a third-set tiebreak. With this result, Pospisil was ranked in the top 40 for the first time in his career.

In Cincinnati, he defeated world No. 17 Gilles Simon in the first round, but succumbed to Belgian David Goffin in the second round. At the US Open, he lost in the first round to Brazilian Rogério Dutra Silva. In doubles, he and Daniel Nestor made it to the third round, where they were defeated by the Bryan brothers.

In Davis Cup action against Serbia, he lost both of his singles rubbers against Novak Djokovic and Janko Tipsarević, but won his doubles rubber, partnering Daniel Nestor. In October at the Masters 1000 in Shanghai, Pospisil beat his second top-10 player when he defeated world No. 10 Richard Gasquet in the first round. He lost to Gaël Monfils in the next round. He reached the semifinals of the Swiss Indoors but was defeated by world No. 6 Roger Federer.

=== 2014: Top 25 debut, Wimbledon doubles title and first ATP singles final ===
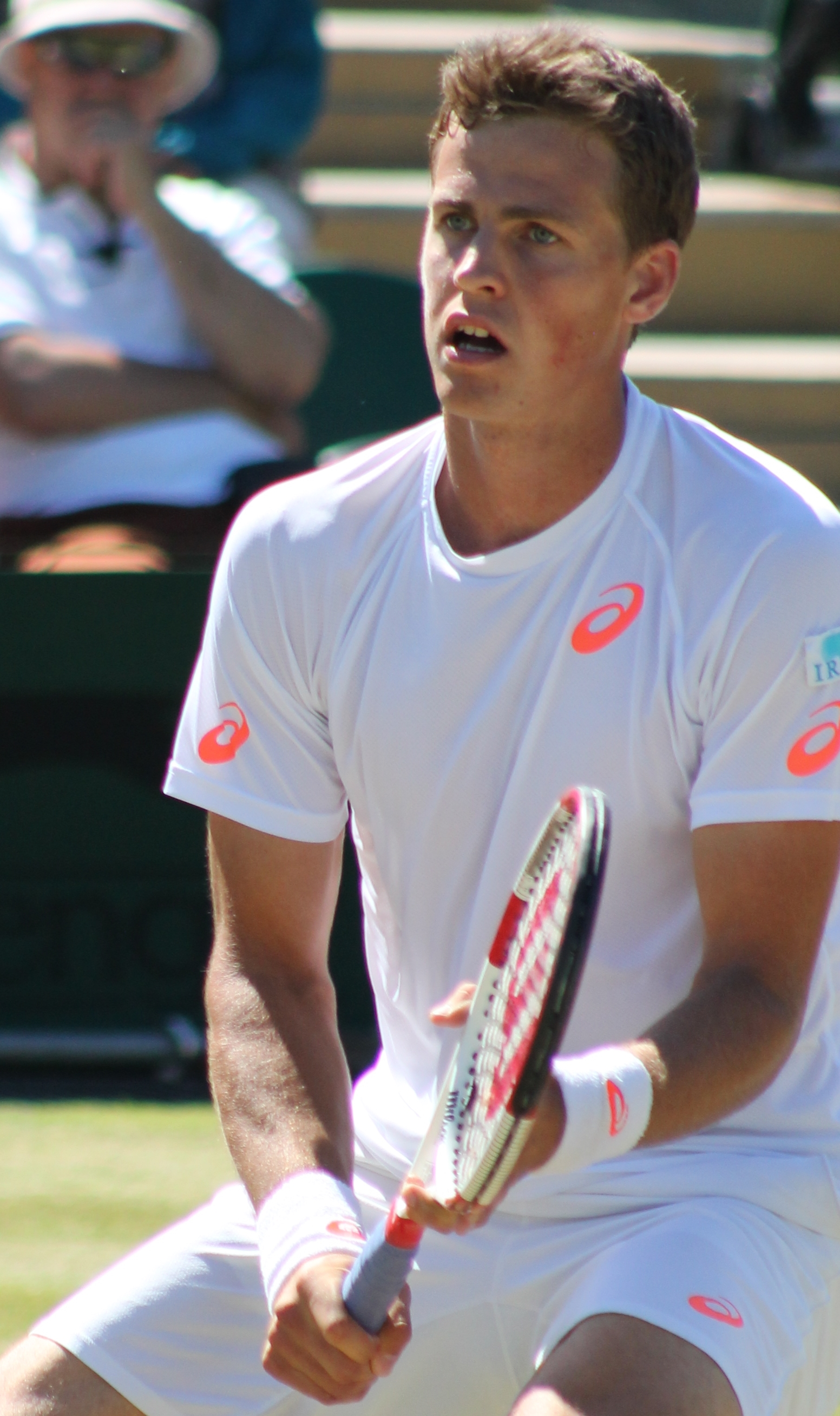
Pospisil at the 2014 Wimbledon Championships

Pospisil began the year strongly by reaching the semifinals of the Aircel Chennai Open. He withdrew from his third round match at the Australian Open, where he was scheduled to play eventual champion Stanislas Wawrinka, due to a back injury. He made a return at the Abierto Mexicano Telcel, but lost to Alexandr Dolgopolov in the first round. He then lost his second-round match at the BNP Paribas Open to Mikhail Kukushkin. Pospisil began his clay-court season at Monte Carlo, but lost in the first round to Roberto Bautista Agut in straight sets.

At Wimbledon, Pospisil lost in the first round of singles, losing to Robin Haase, but partnering American Jack Sock, he won the men's doubles title, defeating the eighth, second, and fifth seeds en route to the final, where they defeated the defending champions the Bryan brothers in five sets. Pospisil and Sock won their second straight doubles title with a victory over Steve Johnson and Sam Querrey at the BB&T Atlanta Open. Pospisil reached his first ATP singles final at the Citi Open a week later with wins over Rajeev Ram, world No. 5 Tomáš Berdych, Santiago Giraldo and world No. 14 Richard Gasquet. He was defeated by world No. 7 Milos Raonic in the first all-Canadian final in ATP history.

Pospisil and Sock reached their third straight final at the Cincinnati Masters, but were defeated by the Bryan brothers in straight sets, ending their record winning streak for a debut team at 14. In October at the China Open, he reached the doubles final with Julien Benneteau, but the duo was defeated in three sets by Jean-Julien Rojer and Horia Tecău. At the end of the month, Pospisil won his third doubles title of the season at the Swiss Indoors with Nenad Zimonjić.

=== 2015: First Grand Slam quarterfinal in singles ===
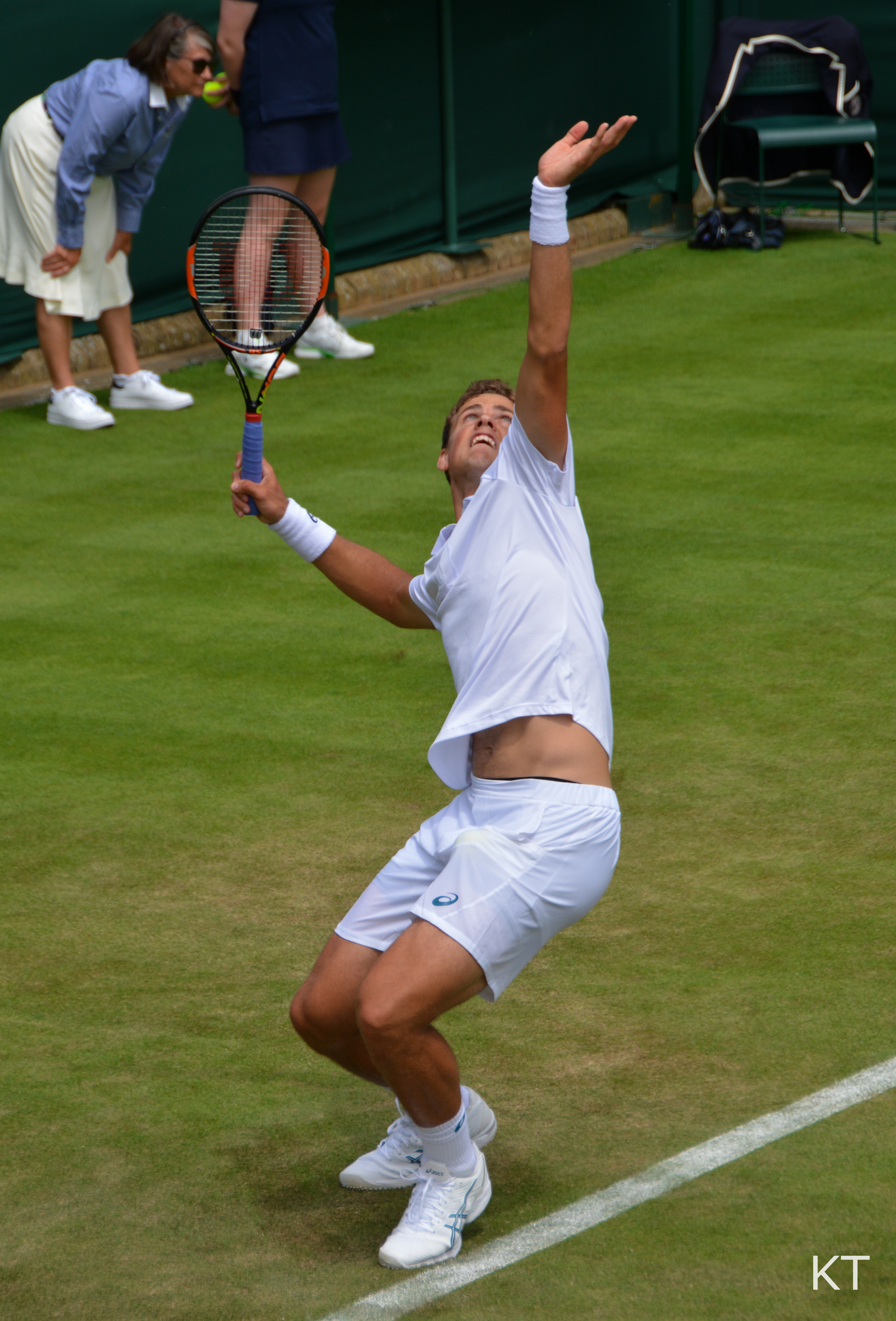
Pospisil at the 2015 Wimbledon Championships

Pospisil started his 2015 season at the Hopman Cup, representing Canada with Eugenie Bouchard. He won his three singles matches, but Canada finished third in their group and was eliminated from the competition. A week later, Pospisil entered the Apia International, losing to fourth seed Julien Benneteau in straight sets in the second round.

At the Australian Open, Pospisil reached the third round for the second straight year, but lost to Guillermo García López in straight sets. In doubles, Pospisil and partner Julian Knowle advanced to the second round; however, they had to retire from this match.

At Indian Wells in March, Pospisil and Sock won their third doubles title together, and their first Masters 1000, after defeating Simone Bolelli and Fabio Fognini. At the Miami Open a week later, Pospisil and Sock reached their second consecutive Masters 1000 final, but lost to the Bryan brothers. Following this tournament, Pospisil's world doubles ranking rose to No. 5, and in doing so, he became the first Canadian in approximately 14 years to overtake Daniel Nestor as the country's top-ranked doubles player.

At Wimbledon, Pospisil reached the quarterfinals of a Grand Slam for the first time in his singles career. Pospisil beat French qualifier Vincent Millot, 30th seed Fabio Fognini, local wildcard James Ward, and 22nd seed Viktor Troicki. All matches extended to five sets except the one against Fognini. He was defeated in the quarterfinals by world No. 3 Andy Murray in straight sets. In doubles, Pospisil, who was the defending champion with his American partner Jack Sock, lost to the 13th seeded and eventual runners-up Jamie Murray and John Peers in the third round.

At the China Open in October, Pospisil won his second doubles title of the season when he defeated, with Sock, fellow Canadian Daniel Nestor and Édouard Roger-Vasselin in the final. The next week, Pospisil reached the second round of the Shanghai Masters, losing to 11th seed Richard Gasquet in three sets. In doubles, Pospisil and Sock were knocked out in the first round by the Australian pair of Nick Kyrgios and Bernard Tomic. At his last tournament of the year, the Valencia Open, Pospisil reached the semifinals, where he lost to João Sousa.

=== 2016: Inconsistencies ===
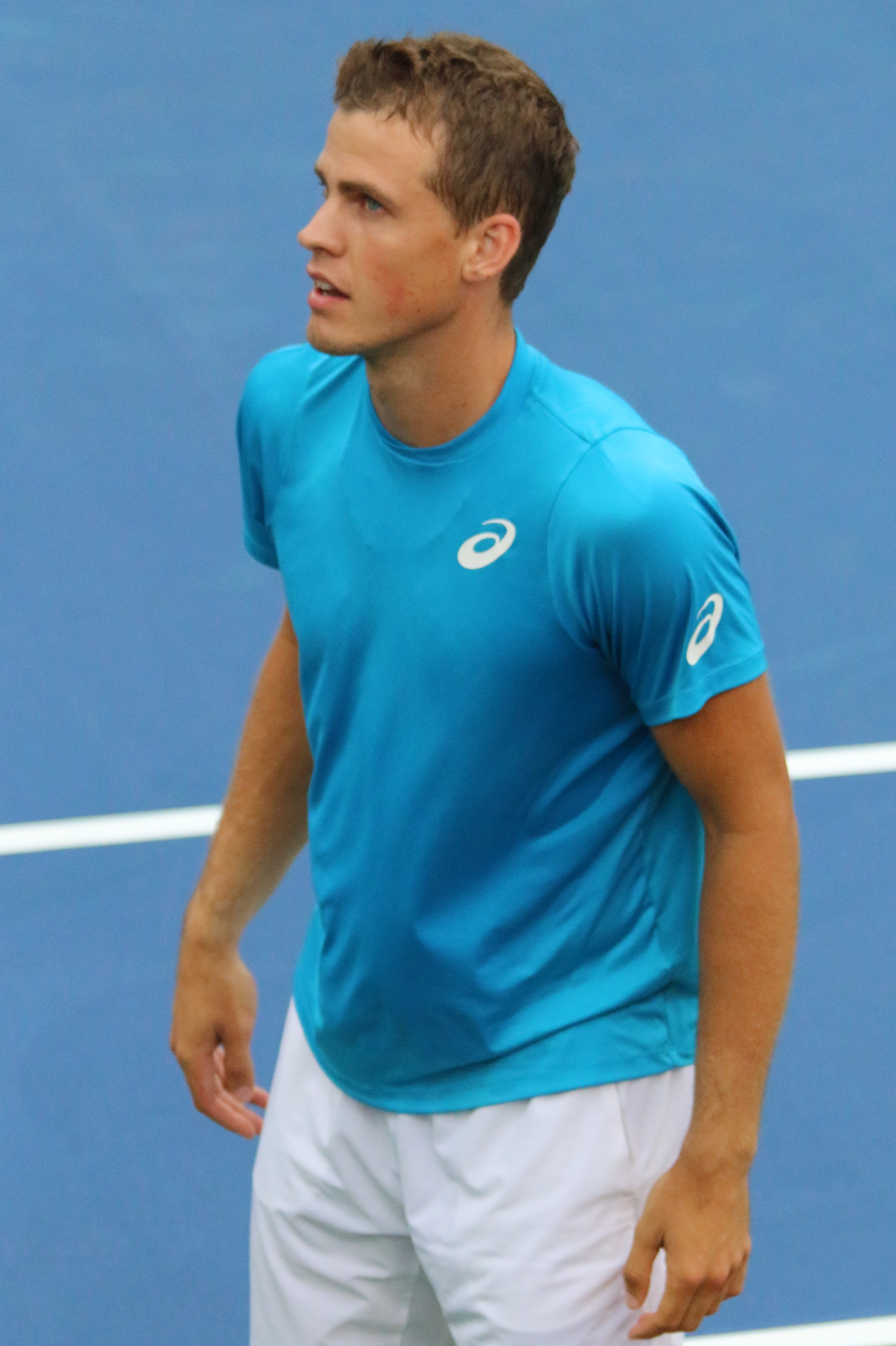
Pospisil at the 2016 US Open

Pospisil started his 2016 season at the Chennai Open as the seventh seed, but was defeated by Aljaž Bedene in the first round. A week later at the Auckland Open, he won his first match of the year against seventh seed Ivo Karlović, before falling to doubles partner Sock in straight sets in the next round. At the Australian Open, he lost his first-round match to world No. 15 Gilles Simon in four sets. At the Rotterdam Open in February, Pospisil won the sixth doubles title of his career, his first with Nicolas Mahut. At the Indian Wells Masters in March, Pospisil reached the second round in singles and the final in doubles.

In May at the Rome Masters, Pospisil was defeated in the opening round in singles and finished runner-up in doubles with Sock. At the French Open, he lost in the first round in singles and in the second round in doubles. At Wimbledon, Pospisil was again defeated in the first round, this time to Albert Ramos Viñolas in four sets. He reached the third round of the doubles event. At the Rogers Cup, Pospisil beat Jérémy Chardy in the opening round but lost to Gaël Monfils in the next round. At the Olympics, he lost in the opening round in singles once again to Monfils and in the bronze medal match in doubles with Daniel Nestor. In September, Pospisil advanced to the second round of the US Open in singles. At the Shanghai Rolex Masters in October, he reached the third round in singles of a Masters 1000 for the second time of his career, defeating respectively world No. 20 Ivo Karlović and world No. 18 Grigor Dimitrov.

=== 2017: Mixed results ===
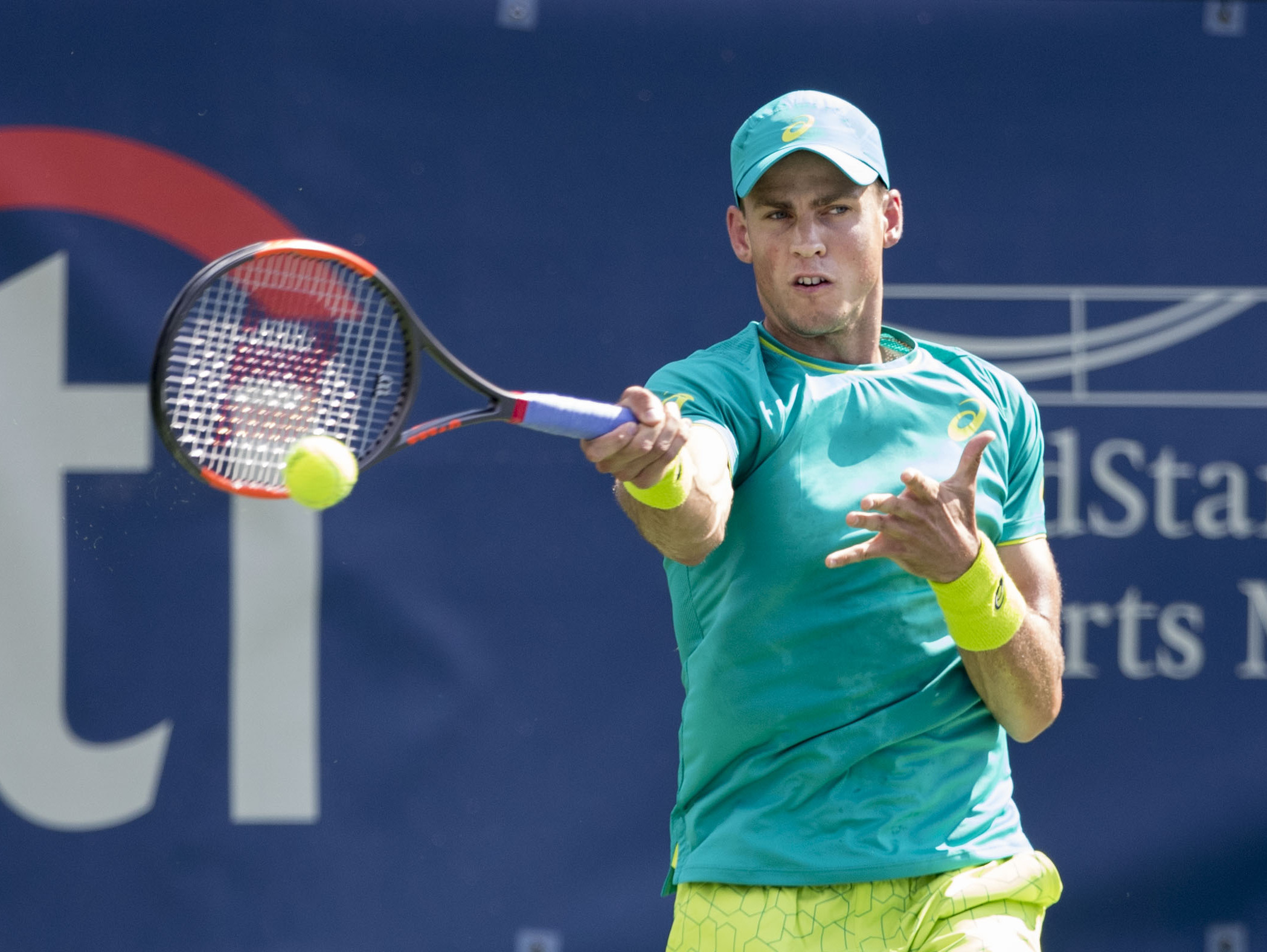
Pospisil at the 2017 Citi Open

During the offseason, Pospisil hired Hall of Famer Mark Woodforde to be his new coach. At his first tournament, the Qatar ExxonMobil Open, he reached the doubles final with Radek Štěpánek. In February, he won his two singles matches at the Davis Cup World Group over top 50 players Kyle Edmund and Dan Evans. The next week at the ATP Challenger 100K in San Francisco, Pospisil made it to the singles final where he was defeated by Zhang Ze in three sets. At the Masters 1000 BNP Paribas Open in March, Pospisil qualified for the main draw and defeated Lu Yen-hsun in the opening round. In the second round, he upset world No. 1 Andy Murray in straight sets, his first win over a top-10 player since 2014. He lost to fellow qualifier Dušan Lajović in the next round. In May, Pospisil won his fifth ATP Challenger singles title in straight sets over Go Soeda at the 150K in Busan. In June at the Ricoh Open, he advanced to his first ATP quarterfinal of the season but was defeated by world No. 7 Marin Čilić.

=== 2018: Two more ATP Challenger wins ===
Pospisil won the sixth ATP Challenger of his career with a victory over Ričardas Berankis at the Open de Rennes. In February, he won his second ATP Challenger title of the season after defeating Nicola Kuhn in the final in Budapest. In May, he advanced to his third ATP Challenger final of the season, losing to Yoshihito Nishioka in Gimcheon. The next week, Pospisil reached the final in Busan for the second straight year, but was not able to defend his title with a loss to Matthew Ebden.

=== 2019: Back surgery and Davis Cup final ===
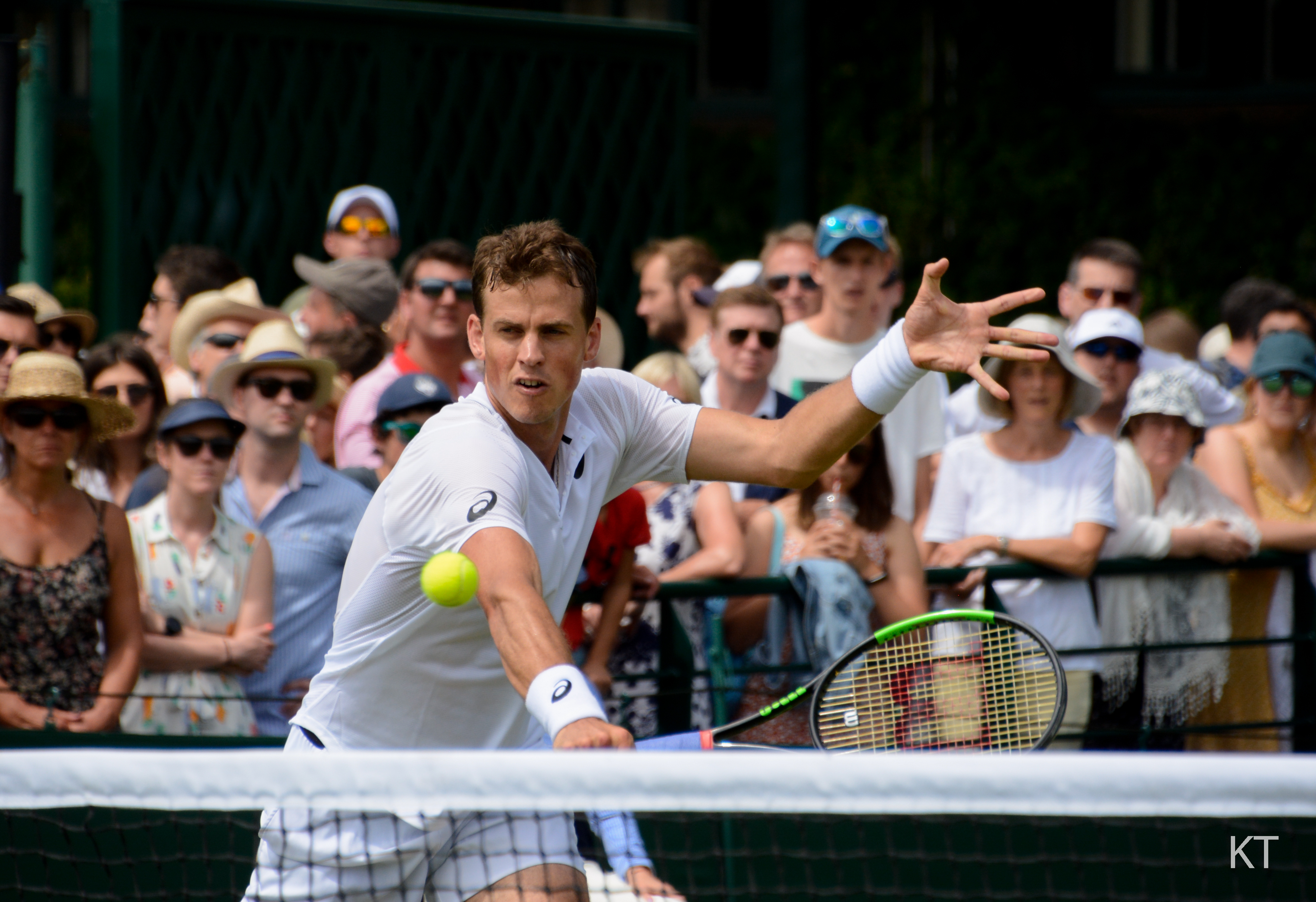
Pospisil at the 2019 Wimbledon Championships

In January, Pospisil underwent surgery to repair a herniated disk. Recovery from the surgery kept him sidelined until the 2019 Wimbledon Championships, where he lost in the first round to Félix Auger-Aliassime.

At the 2019 US Open, Pospisil beat ninth seed Karen Khachanov in the first round.

In the 2019 Davis Cup Finals, he and Denis Shapovalov teamed up to take Canada to its first-ever Davis Cup final in the 119-year history of the event, defeating Russia, Australia, the United States and Italy en route to the finals.

=== 2020: First final since 2014, 7th doubles title, US Open fourth round, ATP comeback player of the year ===
In Montpellier, Pospisil entered using a protected ranking and defeated Aljaž Bedene, Denis Shapovalov, and Richard Gasquet, all in straight sets, before upsetting world number 10 David Goffin in three sets to advance to his first final since Washington in 2014. He lost to top seed Gaël Monfils in straight sets 7–5, 6–3. In his next tournament, the 2020 ABN AMRO World Tennis Tournament, he pulled off one of the biggest upsets of his career by defeating top seed Daniil Medvedev 6–4, 6–3, making it the third top 5 victory of his career. He lost in the second round to Filip Krajinović.

In his third tournament in February, 2020 Open 13 Pospisil again used his protected ranking to gain direct entry to the main draw, and defeated lucky loser Emil Ruusuvuori and 8th seed Hubert Hurkacz, before falling to 2nd seed and eventual champion Stefanos Tsitsipas in the quarterfinals. Unseeded in doubles, he and partner, Nicolas Mahut, won the title, defeating the 4th, 1st and 2nd seeds respectively en route.

At the 2020 US Open, Pospisil reached the fourth round for the first time in his career after beating Philipp Kohlschreiber, 25th seed Milos Raonic in four sets, and then upsetting 8th seed, Roberto Bautista Agut, in a five-set thriller. In the fourth round, he lost to Alex de Minaur in straight sets.

In his last tournament of the season, the 2020 Sofia Open, he entered the main draw unseeded and defeated Illya Marchenko, Jan-Lennard Struff, John Millman and Richard Gasquet en route to his second singles final of the season and third of his career, ultimately falling to Jannik Sinner in three tight back-and-forth sets, 4–6, 6–3, 6–7 ^{(3–7)}.

Pospisil ended the year ranked No. 61 in the world, his highest year-end ranking since 2015, and was named Comeback Player of the Year in the ATP Awards, voted on by his peers.

=== 2021: Fifteenth doubles final and downfall ===
Pospisil played his first tournament of the year at the 2021 Australian Open. In singles, he faced 4th seed and eventual finalist Daniil Medvedev which he lost in straight sets. He partnered Denis Shapovalov in the doubles but fell in the second round to Nicholas Monroe and Frances Tiafoe in three sets.

Partnering Austin Krajicek, Pospisil reached his fifteenth final at the 2021 Hall of Fame Open where he lost to Americans Jack Sock and William Blumberg.

Pospisil failed to capitalize on his success in 2020. He began to suffer injuries again and played few tournaments. His best singles showing was a quarterfinal appearance at the 2021 Eastbourne International where he lost to 2nd seed and eventual champion Alex de Minaur in straight sets. In the end, his ranking fell back down below the top 100 to 133.

Pospisil reappeared for Canada in the 2021 Davis Cup Finals where he lost two singles matches and one doubles match as Canada was eliminated in the group stage.

=== 2022: Challenger success, back to top 100, Davis Cup winner ===
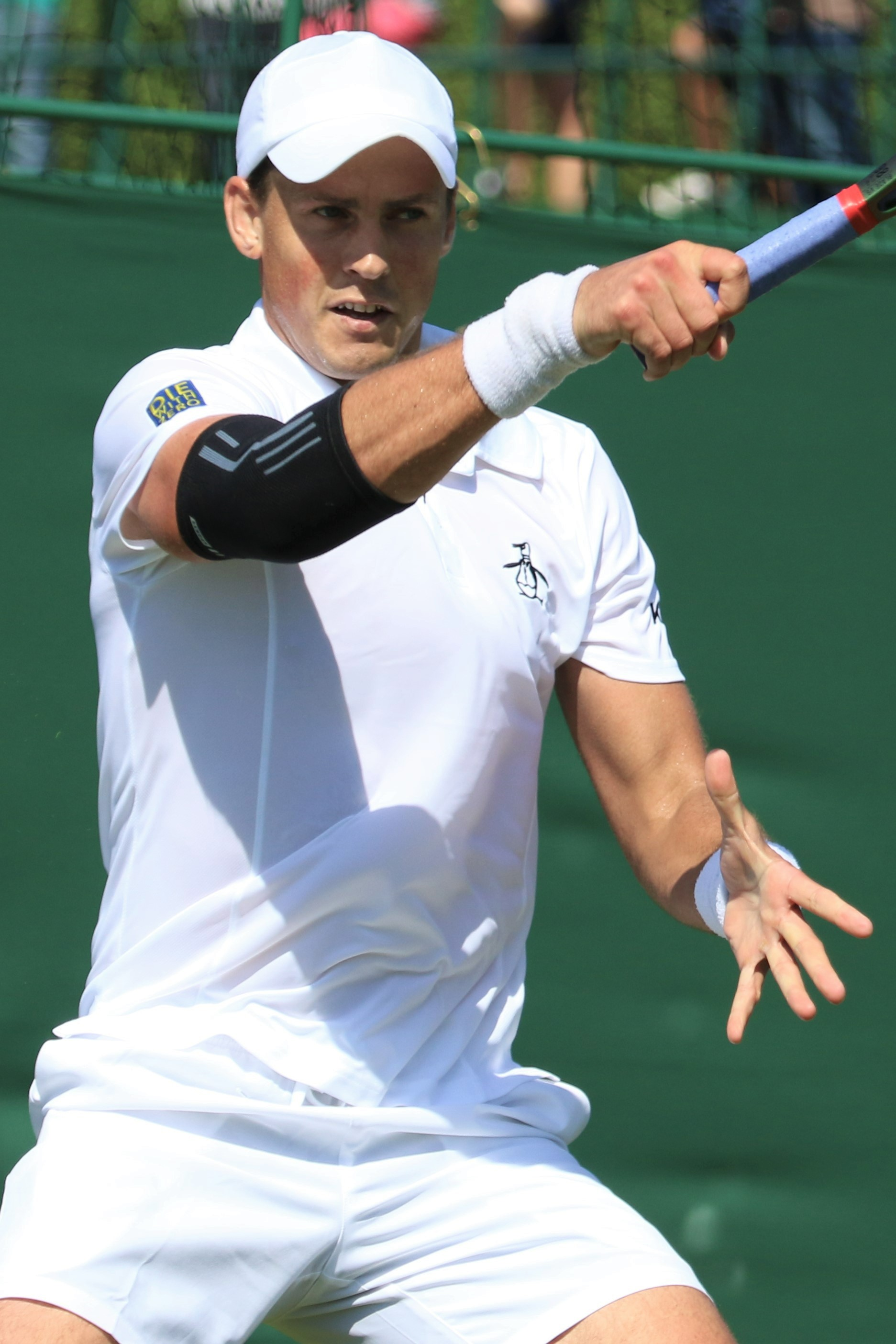
Pospisil at the 2022 Wimbledon Championships

Pospisil played only singles in 2022. He backed out of both the Australian Open and French Open. He qualified for only one ATP tournament which was the 2022 Dallas Open where he made the quarterfinals and lost to 3rd seed John Isner in straight sets.

Despite this, he won his first Challenger title since 2019 at the 2022 Open Quimper Bretange and made the final at the 2022 Teréga Open Pau–Pyrénées losing to 7th seed Quentin Halys in straight sets.

In late March, Pospisil suffered an elbow injury which sidelined him once again. He was expected to return to the tour in June.

In September, as a lucky loser, Pospisil reached quarterfinals of Tel Aviv Open, where he lost in straight sets to No. 1 seed Novak Djokovic, who played his first official tournament since winning Wimbledon. In November, he won the title at the Challenger de Drummondville and finished the year ranked in the top 100.

In November, at the 2022 Davis Cup, Pospisil teamed up with Félix Auger-Aliassime and Denis Shapovalov to give Canada its first ever Davis Cup Finals title. Canada defeated Australia in the finals after winning against Germany and Italy during the week in earlier knock-out rounds.

=== 2023–25: Retirement ===
Pospisil started his 2023 season at the Adelaide International 1. He lost in the final round of qualifying to Roman Safiullin. In doubles, he partnered with his friend, Novak Djokovic. They lost in the first round to Tomislav Brkić and Gonzalo Escobar in three sets. At the Adelaide International 2, he was defeated in the first round of qualifying by Kwon Soon-woo, who ended up winning the tournament. At the Australian Open, he lost in the first round to sixth seed, world No. 7, and compatriot, Félix Auger-Aliassime, in four sets.

Seeded third and defending champion at the 2023 Open Quimper Bretagne, Pospisil lost in the first round to Gijs Brouwer. His ranking fell from 99 to outside the Top 100 at 113. Seeded third at the 2022 Koblenz Open, he reached the final where he was defeated by second seed Roman Safiullin. As the top seed at the 2023 Challenger La Manche, he lost in the first round to Mats Moraing.

On 16 February 2023, Pospisil announced that he would be out of action for the next three to four months for health reasons. He returned in June 2023 at Wimbledon, where he lost in the first round of qualifying to the 22nd seed Felipe Meligeni Alves in straight sets.

On 2 February 2025, following the 2025 Davis Cup tie, he announced it would be his last season. Pospisil played his final professional match at the Canadian Open on 27 July 2025, losing to Facundo Bagnis.

== Career statistics ==
Key
W	F	SF	QF	#R	RR	Q#	P#	DNQ	A	Z#	PO	G	S	B	NMS	NTI	P	NH

(W) winner; (F) finalist; (SF) semifinalist; (QF) quarterfinalist; (#R) rounds 4, 3, 2, 1; (RR) round-robin stage; (Q#) qualification round; (P#) preliminary round; (DNQ) did not qualify; (A) absent; (Z#) Davis/Fed Cup Zonal Group (with number indication) or (PO) play-off; (G) gold, (S) silver or (B) bronze Olympic/Paralympic medal; (NMS) not a Masters tournament; (NTI) not a Tier I tournament; (P) postponed; (NH) not held; (SR) strike rate (events won / competed); (W–L) win–loss record.
To avoid confusion and double counting, these charts are updated at the conclusion of a tournament or when the player's participation has ended.

=== Singles ===
Tournament	2011	2012	2013	2014	2015	2016	2017	2018	2019	2020	2021|	2022	2023	SR	W–L	Win%
Australian Open	A	Q2	A	3R	3R	1R	Q1	1R	A	1R	1R	A	1R	0 / 6	4–6	40%
French Open	A	1R	1R	1R	1R	1R	A	1R	A	1R	A	A	A	0 / 7	0–7	0%
Wimbledon	Q2	1R	2R	1R	QF	1R	1R	1R	1R	NH	2R	Q1	Q1	0 / 9	6–9	40%
US Open	2R	Q1	1R	1R	1R	2R	1R	2R	2R	4R	2R	Q2	Q2	0 / 10	8–10	44%
Win–loss	1–1	0–2	1–3	2–3	6–4	1–4	0–2	1–4	1–2	3–3	2–3	0–0	0–1	0 / 32	18–32	36%

Notes

- ^{1} Pospisil's 2014 Australian Open withdrawal in the third round does not count as a loss.

=== Doubles ===
Tournament	2013	2014	2015	2016	2017	2018	2019	2020	2021	2022	SR	W–L	Win%
Australian Open	A	1R	2R	QF	1R	1R	A	1R	2R	A	0 / 7	4–7	36%
French Open	A	1R	QF	2R	A	1R	A	2R	A	A	0 / 5	5–5	50%
Wimbledon	3R	W	3R	3R	2R	1R	2R	NH	1R	A	1 / 8	14–7	72%
US Open	3R	3R	1R	1R	A	A	1R	A	2R	A	0 / 6	5–6	45%
Win–loss	4–2	8–3	6–4	5–4	1–2	0–3	1–2	1–2	2–3	0–0	1 / 26	28–25	54%

== Coaches ==
Summary of junior and professional coaches
Coach	Period of coaching		Pospisil's rank		
Coach	Start	End	Start	Peak	End
Miloš Pospíšil (1/2)	1995	fall 2002	n/a	n/a	n/a
Vadim Korkh	fall 2002	September 2004	n/a	n/a	n/a
Miloš Pospíšil (2/2)	September 2004	December 2010	n/a	270	336–339
Frédéric Niemeyer	December 2010	October 2012	336–339	85	113
Frédéric Fontang	October 2012	August 2016	113	25	100
Mark Woodforde	October 2016	May 2017	136	111	111
Dirk Hordorff	November 2017	2019	109	70	207
Rainer Schüttler	November 2017	November 2018	109	70	70
Frank Dancevic	August 2019	October 2021	205	57	113
