= 2016 China International Suzhou – Singles =

Singles
- 2016 China International Suzhou

Final
- Champion: (Chinese Taipei) Lu Yen-hsun
- Runner-up: (United States) Stefan Kozlov
- Score: 6–0, 6–1

Events
Singles	Doubles
← 2015 ·	China International Suzhou	· 2017 →

Dudi Sela was the defending champion but chose not to defend his title.

Lu Yen-hsun won the title after defeating Stefan Kozlov 6–0, 6–1 in the final.

== Seeds ==
1. (Chinese Taipei) Lu Yen-hsun (champion)
2. (Japan) Taro Daniel (first round)
3. (Ukraine) Sergiy Stakhovsky (quarterfinals)
4. (South Korea) Chung Hyeon (semifinals)
5. (United States) Stefan Kozlov (final)
6. (Japan) Tatsuma Ito (first round)
7. (China) Wu Di (quarterfinals)
8. (Australia) Andrew Whittington (second round)

== Draw ==
=== Key ===
- Q = Qualifier
- WC = Wild card
- LL = Lucky loser
- Alt = Alternate
- SE = Special exempt
- PR = Protected ranking
- ITF = ITF entry
- JE = Junior exempt
- w/o = Walkover
- r = Retired
- d = Defaulted
- SR = Special ranking

=== Finals ===
Semifinals
1	(Chinese Taipei) Lu Yen-hsun	6	6
4	(South Korea) Chung Hyeon	2	2
5	(United States) Stefan Kozlov	6	0
(Russia) Alexander Kudryavtsev	3	1^{r}

Final
1	(Chinese Taipei) Lu Yen-hsun	6	6
5	(United States) Stefan Kozlov	0	1

=== Top half ===
First round
1	(Chinese Taipei) Y-h Lu	6	6
(Germany) D Masur	4	3
(Indonesia) C Rungkat	6	6
(Japan) Yuya Kibi	4	3
(Italy) A Arnaboldi	7^{7}	6
(Japan) A Santillan	6^{3}	4
WC	(China) R Te	0	3
8	(Australia) A Whittington	6	6
4	(South Korea) H Chung	6	6
LL	(China) Qi Xi	1	1
(France) J Eysseric	6	6
(Chinese Taipei) T Chen	4	2
(Germany) Y Hanfmann	4	1
(South Korea) S-w Kwon	6	6
(Spain) P Riba	6	6
6	(Japan) T Ito	1	4

Second round
1	(Chinese Taipei) Y-h Lu	7	6
(Indonesia) C Rungkat	5	1
(Italy) A Arnaboldi	6	7^{10}
8	(Australia) A Whittington	4	6^{8}
4	(South Korea) H Chung	6	3	7
(France) J Eysseric	2	6	5
(South Korea) S-w Kwon	6^{5}	6^{5}
(Spain) P Riba	7^{7}	7^{7}

Quarterfinals
1	(Chinese Taipei) Y-h Lu	6^{2}	6	6
(Italy) A Arnaboldi	7^{7}	4	3
4	(South Korea) H Chung	6	6
(Spain) P Riba	2	4

Semifinals
1	(Chinese Taipei) Y-h Lu	6	6
4	(South Korea) H Chung	2	2

=== Bottom half ===
First round
5	(United States) S Kozlov	5	6	6
LL	(China) Y He	7	0	4
Q	(Russia) M Elgin	2	6	3
(South Korea) Kim Cheong-eui	6	2	6
(China) Z Li	5	3
(United States) M Krueger	7	6
WC	(China) B Ouyang	4	3
3	(Ukraine) S Stakhovsky	6	6
7	(China) D Wu	6	6
Q	(China) Cao Zhaoyi	1	1
Q	(China) Wang Ruikai	3	3
WC	(China) Xia Zihao	6	6
WC	(China) X Gao	6	6
Q	(China) Y Ning	1	4
(Russia) A Kudryavtsev	7^{7}	6
2	(Japan) T Daniel	6^{3}	3

Second round
5	(United States) S Kozlov	6	6
(South Korea) C-e Kim	4	3
(United States) M Krueger	6	1	4
3	(Ukraine) S Stakhovsky	4	6	6
7	(China) D Wu	6	6
WC	(China) Z Xia	1	1
WC	(China) X Gao	4	2
(Russia) A Kudryavtsev	6	6

Quarterfinals
5	(United States) S Kozlov	3	6	7
3	(Ukraine) S Stakhovsky	6	2	5
7	(China) D Wu	6^{5}	6^{6}
(Russia) A Kudryavtsev	7^{7}	7^{8}

Semifinals
5	(United States) S Kozlov	6	0
(Russia) A Kudryavtsev	3	1^{r}
