= 2017 China International Suzhou – Doubles =

Doubles
- 2017 China International Suzhou

Final
- Champions: (China) Gao Xin (China) Sun Fajing
- Runners-up: (China) Gong Maoxin (China) Zhang Ze
- Score: 7–6^{(7–5)}, 4–6, [10–7]

Events
Singles	Doubles
← 2016 ·	China International Suzhou	· 2025 →

Mikhail Elgin and Alexander Kudryavtsev were the defending champions but chose not to defend their title.

Gao Xin and Sun Fajing won the title after defeating Gong Maoxin and Zhang Ze 7–6^{(7–5)}, 4–6, [10–7] in the final.

== Seeds ==
1. (India) Jeevan Nedunchezhiyan / (Indonesia) Christopher Rungkat (semifinals, withdrew)
2. (India) Sriram Balaji / (India) Vishnu Vardhan (first round)
3. (China) Gong Maoxin / (China) Zhang Ze (final)
4. (Italy) Riccardo Ghedin / (Belarus) Yaraslav Shyla (semifinals)

== Draw ==
=== Key ===
- Q = Qualifier
- WC = Wild card
- LL = Lucky loser
- Alt = Alternate
- ITF = ITF entry
- PR = Protected ranking
- SR = Special ranking
- SE = Special exempt
- JE = Junior exempt
- JR = Junior Accelerator Programme entrant
- CO = College Accelerator Programme entrant
- NG = Next Gen Accelerator Program entrant
- w/o = Walkover
- r = Retired
- d = Defaulted

First round
1	(India) J Nedunchezhiyan (Indonesia) C Rungkat	6	6
(South Korea) D-h Lee (Japan) H Moriya	3	3
(China) D Wu (China) Zh Zhang	3	3
(Sweden) M Eriksson (Japan) N Nakagawa	6	6
3	(China) M Gong (China) Ze Zhang	6	6
WC	(China) R Te (China) C Wang	2	0
(Poland) H Hurkacz (Russia) R Safiullin	7	7^{7}
WC	(China) Wu Hao (China) Xia Zihao	5	6^{3}
(France) S Doumbia (France) C Hemery	4	6^{0}
(Japan) T Matsui (Japan) K Uchida	6	7^{7}
(China) Y Bai (China) Z Li	0^{r}
4	(Italy) R Ghedin (Belarus) Y Shyla	1
(China) X Gao (China) F Sun	6	4	[10]
(Serbia) M Kecmanović (Serbia) D Petrović	4	6	[8]
(Italy) Lorenzo Frigerio (Netherlands) Miliaan Niesten	6	6
2	(India) S Balaji (India) V Vardhan	2	1

Quarterfinals
1	(India) J Nedunchezhiyan (Indonesia) C Rungkat	6	6
(Sweden) M Eriksson (Japan) N Nakagawa	3	4
3	(China) M Gong (China) Ze Zhang	6	7
(Poland) H Hurkacz (Russia) R Safiullin	4	5
(Japan) T Matsui (Japan) K Uchida	3	2
4	(Italy) R Ghedin (Belarus) Y Shyla	6	6
(China) X Gao (China) F Sun	6	6
(Italy) L Frigerio (Netherlands) M Niesten	4	1

Semifinals
1	(India) J Nedunchezhiyan (Indonesia) C Rungkat
3	(China) M Gong (China) Ze Zhang	w/o
4	(Italy) R Ghedin (Belarus) Y Shyla	3	2
(China) X Gao (China) F Sun	6	6

Final
3	(China) M Gong (China) Ze Zhang	6^{5}	6	[7]
(China) X Gao (China) F Sun	7^{7}	4	[10]
