= 2015 China International Suzhou – Doubles =

Doubles
- 2015 China International Suzhou

Final
- Champions: (Chinese Taipei) Lee Hsin-han (Ukraine) Denys Molchanov
- Runners-up: (China) Gong Maoxin (Chinese Taipei) Peng Hsien-yin
- Score: 3–6, 7–6^{(7–5)}, [10–4]

Events
Singles	Doubles
China International Suzhou	· 2016 →

Lee Hsin-han and Denys Molchanov won the title, beating Gong Maoxin and Peng Hsien-yin 3–6, 7–6^{(7–5)}, [10–4]

== Seeds ==
1. (Chinese Taipei) Lee Hsin-han / (Ukraine) Denys Molchanov (champions)
2. (China) Gong Maoxin / (Chinese Taipei) Peng Hsien-yin (final)
3. (China) Bai Yan / (Italy) Riccardo Ghedin (quarterfinals)
4. (Chinese Taipei) Hsieh Cheng-peng / (Chinese Taipei) Yang Tsung-hua (quarterfinals)

== Draw ==
=== Key ===
- Q = Qualifier
- WC = Wild card
- LL = Lucky loser
- Alt = Alternate
- SE = Special exempt
- PR = Protected ranking
- ITF = ITF entry
- JE = Junior exempt
- w/o = Walkover
- r = Retired
- d = Defaulted
- SR = Special ranking

=== Draw ===
First round
1	(Chinese Taipei) H-h Lee (Ukraine) D Molchanov	6	6
(Germany) P Gojowczyk (Germany) N Langer	0	3
WC	(China) Feng He (China) Yuqing Ning	6	6
WC	(China) Y He (China) Zhuoyang Qiu	0	3
3	(China) Y Bai (Italy) R Ghedin	6	4	[10]
(China) D Wu (China) Zh Zhang	4	6	[5]
(France) T Lamasine (China) Ze Zhang	6	6
WC	(China) Zhaoyi Cao (China) X Gao	3	2
(Israel) D Sela (Israel) A Weintraub	5	5
(Italy) T Fabbiano (Estonia) J Zopp	7	7
(Japan) H Moriya (France) Laurent Rochette	2	4
4	(Chinese Taipei) C-p Hsieh (Chinese Taipei) T-h Yang	6	6
(China) Long Chen (China) F Sun	3	3
(Croatia) N Mektić (Croatia) F Škugor	6	6
(Italy) F Cipolla (Belarus) U Ignatik	2	2
2	(China) M Gong (Chinese Taipei) H-y Peng	6	6

Quarterfinals
1	(Chinese Taipei) H-h Lee (Ukraine) D Molchanov	6^{5}	6	[10]
WC	(China) H Feng (China) N Yuqing	7^{7}	3	[7]
3	(China) Y Bai (Italy) R Ghedin	2	2
(France) T Lamasine (China) Ze Zhang	6	6
(Italy) T Fabbiano (Estonia) J Zopp	7^{7}	6
4	(Chinese Taipei) C-p Hsieh (Chinese Taipei) T-h Yang	6^{1}	0
(Croatia) N Mektić (Croatia) F Škugor	2	2
2	(China) M Gong (Chinese Taipei) H-y Peng	6	6

Semifinals
1	(Chinese Taipei) H-h Lee (Ukraine) D Molchanov	6	6
(France) T Lamasine (China) Ze Zhang	3	4
(Italy) T Fabbiano (Estonia) J Zopp	4	6	[6]
2	(China) M Gong (Chinese Taipei) H-y Peng	6	1	[10]

Final
1	(Chinese Taipei) H-h Lee (Ukraine) D Molchanov	3	7^{7}	[10]
2	(China) M Gong (Chinese Taipei) H-y Peng	6	6^{5}	[4]
