= 2025 China International Suzhou – Doubles =

Doubles
- 2025 China International Suzhou

Final
- Champions: (Australia) Blake Bayldon (Chinese Taipei) Ray Ho
- Runners-up: (India) S D Prajwal Dev (India) Nitin Kumar Sinha
- Score: 6–4, 6–3

Events
Singles	Doubles
← 2017 ·	China International Suzhou	· 2026 →

Gao Xin and Sun Fajing were the defending champions from when the tournament was last held in 2017, but they chose not to defend their title.

Blake Bayldon and Ray Ho won the title after defeating S D Prajwal Dev and Nitin Kumar Sinha 6–4, 6–3 in the final.

== Seeds ==
1. (Australia) Blake Bayldon / (Chinese Taipei) Ray Ho (champions)
2. (New Zealand) Finn Reynolds / (New Zealand) James Watt (quarterfinals)
3. (United States) Nathaniel Lammons / (Netherlands) Jean-Julien Rojer (semifinals)
4. (Japan) Kaito Uesugi / (Japan) Seita Watanabe (first round)

== Draw ==
=== Key ===
- Q = Qualifier
- WC = Wild card
- LL = Lucky loser
- Alt = Alternate
- ITF = ITF entry
- PR = Protected ranking
- SR = Special ranking
- SE = Special exempt
- JE = Junior exempt
- JR = Junior Accelerator Programme entrant
- CO = College Accelerator Programme entrant
- NG = Next Gen Accelerator Program entrant
- w/o = Walkover
- r = Retired
- d = Defaulted

=== Draw ===
First round
1	(Australia) B Bayldon (Chinese Taipei) R Ho	7^{7}	6
(Philippines) FC Alcantara (South Africa) L Harris	6^{3}	4
(Thailand) P Isaro (India) N Kaliyanda Poonacha	6	6
(Chinese Taipei) Y-h Hsu (Chinese Taipei) T-h Huang	2	2
4	(Japan) K Uesugi (Japan) S Watanabe	6	3	[6]
(Japan) Y Shimizu (Japan) N Tajima	4	6	[10]
E Agafonov; I Simakin	6	7^{7}
WC	(China) J Cui (China) R Te	1	6^{3}
(Japan) Ryuki Matsuda (Thailand) K Samrej	6	6
WC	(China) J Shang (China) Zhang Zurui	1	3
(Portugal) F Ferreira Silva (Portugal) H Rocha	1	4
3	(United States) N Lammons (Netherlands) J-J Rojer	6	6
(India) SDP Dev (India) Nitin Kumar Sinha	4	7^{7}	[10]
PR	(Chinese Taipei) J Jung (India) J Nedunchezhiyan	6	6^{4}	[8]
(Japan) K Isomura (China) A Wang	4	6^{1}
2	(New Zealand) F Reynolds (New Zealand) J Watt	6	7^{7}

Quarterfinals
1	(Australia) B Bayldon (Chinese Taipei) R Ho	7^{7}	7^{7}
(Thailand) P Isaro (India) N Kaliyanda Poonacha	6^{5}	6^{2}
(Japan) Y Shimizu (Japan) N Tajima	7	6
E Agafonov; I Simakin	5	3
(Japan) R Matsuda (Thailand) K Samrej	3	3
3	(United States) N Lammons (Netherlands) J-J Rojer	6	6
(India) SDP Dev (India) NK Sinha	7^{7}	6
2	(New Zealand) F Reynolds (New Zealand) J Watt	6^{4}	2

Semifinals
1	(Australia) B Bayldon (Chinese Taipei) R Ho	7	6
(Japan) Y Shimizu (Japan) N Tajima	5	3
3	(United States) N Lammons (Netherlands) J-J Rojer	4	6	[8]
(India) SDP Dev (India) NK Sinha	6	2	[10]

Final
1	(Australia) B Bayldon (Chinese Taipei) R Ho	6	6
(India) SDP Dev (India) NK Sinha	4	3
