= 2025 China International Suzhou – Singles =

Singles
- 2025 China International Suzhou

Final
- Champion: (Japan) Yoshihito Nishioka
- Runner-up: (France) Harold Mayot
- Score: 6–4, 6–4

Events
Singles	Doubles
← 2017 ·	China International Suzhou	· 2026 →

Miomir Kecmanović was the defending champion from when the tournament was last held in 2017, but he chose not to defend his title.

Yoshihito Nishioka won the title after defeating Harold Mayot 6–4, 6–4 in the final.

== Seeds ==
1. (Japan) Yoshihito Nishioka (champion)
2. (Hong Kong) Coleman Wong (first round)
3. (Portugal) Henrique Rocha (first round)
4. (Australia) Bernard Tomic (withdrew)
5. (France) Harold Mayot (final)
6. (Australia) Jason Kubler (first round, retired)
7. (Australia) James McCabe (quarterfinals)
8. (Japan) Sho Shimabukuro (first round, retired)
9. (Japan) Yuta Shimizu (quarterfinals)

== Draw ==
Key

- Q = Qualifier
- WC = Wild card
- LL = Lucky loser
- Alt = Alternate
- ITF = ITF entry
- PR = Protected ranking
- SR = Special ranking
- SE = Special exempt
- JE = Junior exempt
- JR = Junior Accelerator Programme entrant
- CO = College Accelerator Programme entrant
- NG = Next Gen Accelerator Program entrant
- w/o = Walkover
- r = Retired
- d = Defaulted

=== Finals ===
Semifinals
1	(Japan) Yoshihito Nishioka	7	6
Alt	(Croatia) Duje Ajduković	5	4
5	(France) Harold Mayot	6	6
(Chinese Taipei) Hsu Yu-hsiou	4	2

Final
1	(Japan) Yoshihito Nishioka	6	6
5	(France) Harold Mayot	4	4

=== Top half ===
First round
1	(Japan) Y Nishioka	7	7^{7}
(China) Y Zhou	5	6^{1}
LL	(Uzbekistan) S Fomin	4	1
(Japan) Renta Tokuda	6	6
(Portugal) F Ferreira Silva	6^{5}	6	6
Q	Maxim Zhukov	7^{7}	3	3
I Simakin	7	3
8	(Japan) S Shimabukuro	5	2^{r}
3	(Portugal) H Rocha	7^{7}	6^{6}	4
Alt	(Croatia) D Ajduković	6^{1}	7^{8}	6
(China) J Cui	7^{9}	4	4^{r}
Q	(Japan) Y Takahashi	6^{7}	6	5
Q	(Chinese Taipei) T-h Huang	7^{8}	7^{7}
(United States) G Johns	6^{6}	6^{2}
(South Africa) L Harris	6	4
6	(Australia) J Kubler	3	0^{r}

Second round
1	(Japan) Y Nishioka	6	6
(Japan) R Tokuda	2	2
(Portugal) F Ferreira Silva	7	6
I Simakin	5	2
Alt	(Croatia) D Ajduković	6	7
Q	(Japan) Y Takahashi	3	5
Q	(Chinese Taipei) T-h Huang	6	2	3
(South Africa) L Harris	4	6	6

Quarterfinals
1	(Japan) Y Nishioka	7^{10}	6
(Portugal) F Ferreira Silva	6^{8}	3
Alt	(Croatia) D Ajduković	3	6	6
(South Africa) L Harris	6	4	4

Semifinals
1	(Japan) Y Nishioka	7	6
Alt	(Croatia) D Ajduković	5	4

=== Bottom half ===
First round
5	(France) H Mayot	6	6^{6}	7
(Japan) Y Uchiyama	4	7^{8}	5
WC	(China) Y Mo	3	1
JR	(Japan) Naoya Honda	6	6
Q	(Japan) Takuya Kumasaka	7	6
(Australia) O Jasika	5	4
(China) F Sun	7	4	4
9	(Japan) Y Shimizu	5	6	6
7	(Australia) J McCabe	6^{4}	6	6
PR	(Chinese Taipei) J Jung	7^{7}	4	2
Q	(Uzbekistan) K Sultanov	5	3
Q	(Chinese Taipei) T-l Wu	7	6
WC	(China) A Wang	4	7^{10}	6
WC	(China) R Te	6	6^{8}	2
(Chinese Taipei) Y-h Hsu	6^{4}	6	7^{7}
2	(Hong Kong) C Wong	7^{7}	2	6^{2}

Second round
5	(France) H Mayot	6	3
JR	(Japan) N Honda	0	0^{r}
Q	(Japan) T Kumasaka	0	7	6^{4}
9	(Japan) Y Shimizu	6	5	7^{7}
7	(Australia) J McCabe	2	6	6
Q	(Chinese Taipei) T-l Wu	6	3	2
WC	(China) A Wang	1	4
(Chinese Taipei) Y-h Hsu	6	6

Quarterfinals
5	(France) H Mayot	6	6
9	(Japan) Y Shimizu	4	2
7	(Australia) J McCabe	4	0
(Chinese Taipei) Y-h Hsu	6	6

Semifinals
5	(France) H Mayot	6	6
(Chinese Taipei) Y-h Hsu	4	2
