= 2015 China International Suzhou =

- Date: 26 October – 1 November
- Edition: 1st
- Draw: 32S / 16D
- Prize money: $75,000
- Surface: Hard
- Location: Suzhou, China

Champions

Singles
- (Israel) Dudi Sela

Doubles
- (Chinese Taipei) Lee Hsin-han / (Ukraine) Denys Molchanov
China International Suzhou	· 2016 →

The 2015 China International Suzhou was a professional tennis tournament played on hard courts. It was the first edition of the tournament, which was part of the 2015 ATP Challenger Tour. It took place in Suzhou, China from October 26 to November 1, 2015.

== Singles main-draw entrants ==
=== Seeds ===
Country	Player	Rank^{1}	Seed
TPE	Lu Yen-hsun	91	1
ISR	Dudi Sela	110	2
EST	Jürgen Zopp	161	3
ITA	Thomas Fabbiano	163	4
GER	Peter Gojowczyk	165	5
CHN	Zhang Ze	186	6
FRA	Tristan Lamasine	193	7
JPN	Hiroki Moriya	202	8

- Rankings are as of October 19, 2015.

=== Other entrants ===
The following players received wildcards into the singles main draw:

- (China) He Yecong
- (China) Yuqing Ning
- (China) Gao Xin
- (China) Zhang Zhizhen

The following players received entry from the qualifying draw:

- (China) Zhaoyi Cao
- (France) Laurent Rochette
- (China) Sun Fajing
- (China) Sheng Hao Zhou

== Champions ==
=== Singles ===
- (Israel) Dudi Sela def. (Croatia) Matija Pecotić 6–1, 1–0 retired

=== Doubles ===
- (Chinese Taipei) Lee Hsin-han / (Ukraine) Denys Molchanov def. (China) Gong Maoxin / (Chinese Taipei) Peng Hsien-yin 3–6, 7–6^{(7–5)}, [10–4]
