= 2023 Delray Beach Open =

- Date: February 13–19
- Edition: 31st
- Draw: 28S / 16D
- Prize money: $642,735
- Surface: Hard
- Location: Delray Beach, United States
- Venue: Delray Beach Tennis Center

Champions

Singles
- (United States) Taylor Fritz

Doubles
- (El Salvador) Marcelo Arévalo / (Netherlands) Jean-Julien Rojer
← 2022 ·	Delray Beach Open	· 2024 →

The 2023 Delray Beach Open was a professional men's tennis tournament played on hard courts. It was the 31st edition of the tournament and part of the 2023 ATP Tour. It took place in Delray Beach, United States between February 13 and February 19, 2023.

== Finals ==
=== Singles ===
- (United States) Taylor Fritz def. (Serbia) Miomir Kecmanović, 6–0, 5–7, 6–2

=== Doubles ===
- (El Salvador) Marcelo Arévalo / (Netherlands) Jean-Julien Rojer def. (Australia) Rinky Hijikata / (United States) Reese Stalder, 6–3, 6–4

== Point and prize money ==
=== Point distribution ===
Event	W	F	SF	QF	Round of 16	Round of 32	Q	Q2	Q1
Singles	250	150	90	45	20	0	12	6	0
Doubles	250	150	90	45	0	—	—	—	—

=== Prize money ===
Event	W	F	SF	QF	Round of 16	Round of 32	Q2	Q1
Singles	$97,760	$57,025	$33,525	$19,425	$11,280	$6,895	$3,445	$1,880
Doubles*	$33,960	$18,170	$10,660	$5,950	$3,510	—	—	—
Doubles prize money per team

== Singles main-draw entrants ==
=== Seeds ===
Country	Player	Rank^{1}	Seed
USA	Taylor Fritz	9	1
USA	Tommy Paul	19	2
CAN	Denis Shapovalov	27	3
SRB	Miomir Kecmanović	33	4
JPN	Yoshihito Nishioka	34	5
~~USA~~	~~Jenson Brooksby~~	~~36~~	~~6~~
~~USA~~	~~John Isner~~	~~39~~	~~7~~
USA	Ben Shelton	41	8
USA	J. J. Wolf	43	9

^{†} Rankings are as of 6 February 2022.

=== Other entrants ===
The following players received wildcards into the main draw:

- (United States) Aleksandar Kovacevic
- (United States) Jack Sock
- (Spain) Fernando Verdasco

The following players received entry as a special exempt:

- ~~(China) Wu Yibing~~

The following players received entry from the qualifying draw:

- (Portugal) Nuno Borges
- (United States) Christopher Eubanks
- (Croatia) Matija Pecotić
- (Chinese Taipei) Wu Tung-lin

The following players received entry as lucky losers:

- (United States) Steve Johnson
- (Australia) Aleksandar Vukic

=== Withdrawals ===
Before the tournament

- (United States) Jenson Brooksby → replaced by (United States) Denis Kudla
- (United States) John Isner → replaced by (Australia) Aleksandar Vukic
- (Czech Republic) Jiří Lehečka → replaced by (Ecuador) Emilio Gómez
- (United States) Reilly Opelka → replaced by (Moldova) Radu Albot
- (China) Wu Yibing → replaced by (United States) Steve Johnson

== Doubles main-draw entrants ==
=== Seeds ===
Country	Player	Country	Player	Rank^{1}	Seed
ESA	Marcelo Arévalo	NED	Jean-Julien Rojer	10	1
GBR	Jamie Murray	NZL	Michael Venus	50	2
USA	Nathaniel Lammons	USA	Jackson Withrow	94	3
GBR	Julian Cash	GBR	Henry Patten	127	4

- ^{1} Rankings are as of 6 February 2023.

=== Other entrants ===
The following pairs received wildcards into the main draw:

- (United States) Christian Harrison / (United States) Denis Kudla
- (United States) Brandon Holt / (United States) Alex Lawson

=== Withdrawals ===
- (France) Jérémy Chardy / (France) Fabrice Martin → replaced by (Ecuador) Diego Hidalgo / (United States) Hunter Reese
- (Pakistan) Aisam-ul-Haq Qureshi / (Mexico) Miguel Ángel Reyes-Varela → replaced by (Mexico) Hans Hach Verdugo / (Mexico) Miguel Ángel Reyes-Varela
