= 2023 Delray Beach Open – Doubles =

Doubles
- 2023 Delray Beach Open

Final
- Champions: (El Salvador) Marcelo Arévalo (Netherlands) Jean-Julien Rojer
- Runners-up: (Australia) Rinky Hijikata (United States) Reese Stalder
- Score: 6–3, 6–4

Events
Singles	Doubles
← 2022 ·	Delray Beach Open	· 2024 →

Defending champions Marcelo Arévalo and Jean-Julien Rojer defeated Rinky Hijikata and Reese Stalder in the final, 6–3, 6–4 to win the doubles tennis title at the 2023 Delray Beach Open.

== Seeds ==
1. (El Salvador) Marcelo Arévalo / (Netherlands) Jean-Julien Rojer (champions)
2. (United Kingdom) Jamie Murray / (New Zealand) Michael Venus (quarterfinals)
3. (United States) Nathaniel Lammons / (United States) Jackson Withrow (first round)
4. (United Kingdom) Julian Cash / (United Kingdom) Henry Patten (quarterfinals)

== Draw ==
=== Key ===
- Q = Qualifier
- WC = Wild card
- LL = Lucky loser
- Alt = Alternate
- SE = Special exempt
- PR = Protected ranking
- ITF = ITF entry
- JE = Junior exempt
- w/o = Walkover
- r = Retired
- d = Defaulted
- SR = Special ranking

=== Draw ===
First round
1	(El Salvador) M Arévalo (Netherlands) J-J Rojer	6	7
WC	(United States) B Holt (United States) A Lawson	3	5
(Austria) P Oswald (Australia) J Thompson	6	6
(India) Y Bhambri (India) S Myneni	2	4
4	(United Kingdom) J Cash (United Kingdom) H Patten	6	6
WC	(United States) C Harrison (United States) D Kudla	2	3
(United States) M McDonald (United States) B Shelton	4	6^{6}
(United States) R Galloway (Australia) J-P Smith	6	7^{8}
(Ecuador) D Hidalgo (United States) H Reese	6	5	[6]
(Mexico) H Hach Verdugo (Mexico) MÁ Reyes-Varela	3	7	[10]
(Portugal) N Borges (Sweden) A Göransson	6	3	[10]
3	(United States) N Lammons (United States) J Withrow	3	6	[6]
(Argentina) G Andreozzi (Argentina) G Durán	5	6	[6]
(Australia) R Hijikata (United States) R Stalder	7	2	[10]
(United States) W Blumberg (Serbia) M Kecmanović	4	3
2	(United Kingdom) J Murray (New Zealand) M Venus	6	6

Quarterfinals
1	(El Salvador) M Arévalo (Netherlands) J-J Rojer	6	6
(Austria) P Oswald (Australia) J Thompson	3	4
4	(United Kingdom) J Cash (United Kingdom) H Patten	2	7^{7}	[14]
(United States) R Galloway (Australia) J-P Smith	6	6^{4}	[16]
(Mexico) H Hach Verdugo (Mexico) MÁ Reyes-Varela	7	7
(Portugal) N Borges (Sweden) A Göransson	5	5
(Australia) R Hijikata (United States) R Stalder	3	7	[10]
2	(United Kingdom) J Murray (New Zealand) M Venus	6	5	[6]

Semifinals
1	(El Salvador) M Arévalo (Netherlands) J-J Rojer	6	5	[10]
(United States) R Galloway (Australia) J-P Smith	3	7	[6]
(Mexico) H Hach Verdugo (Mexico) MÁ Reyes-Varela	3	2
(Australia) R Hijikata (United States) R Stalder	6	6

Final
1	(El Salvador) M Arévalo (Netherlands) J-J Rojer	6	6
(Australia) R Hijikata (United States) R Stalder	3	4
