= 2016 China International Suzhou =

- Date: 24 October – 30 October
- Edition: 2nd
- Draw: 32S / 16D
- Prize money: $75,000
- Surface: Hard
- Location: Suzhou, China

Champions

Singles
- (Chinese Taipei) Lu Yen-hsun

Doubles
- (Russia) Mikhail Elgin / (Russia) Alexander Kudryavtsev
← 2015 ·	China International Suzhou	· 2017 →

The 2016 China International Suzhou is a professional tennis tournament played on hard courts. It is the second edition of the tournament, which is part of the 2016 ATP Challenger Tour. It takes place in Suzhou, China from October 24 to October 30, 2016.

== Singles main-draw entrants ==
=== Seeds ===
Country	Player	Rank^{1}	Seed
TPE	Lu Yen-hsun	81	1
JPN	Taro Daniel	96	2
UKR	Sergiy Stakhovsky	117	3
KOR	Chung Hyeon	146	4
USA	Stefan Kozlov	155	5
JPN	Tatsuma Ito	159	6
CHN	Wu Di	163	7
AUS	Andrew Whittington	175	8

- Rankings are as of October 17, 2016.

=== Other entrants ===
The following players received wildcards into the singles main draw:

- (China) Gao Xin
- (China) Ouyang Bowen
- (China) Te Rigele
- (China) Xia Zihao

The following players received entry from the qualifying draw:

- (Russia) Mikhail Elgin
- (China) Ying Nuqing
- (China) Wang Ruikai
- (China) Cao Zhaoyi

The following players entered as lucky losers:

- (China) Qi Xi
- (China) He Yecong

== Champions ==
=== Singles ===
- (Chinese Taipei) Yen-hsun Lu def. (United States) Stefan Kozlov, 6–0, 6–1.

=== Doubles ===
- (Russia) Mikhail Elgin / (Russia) Alexander Kudryavtsev def. (Italy) Andrea Arnaboldi / (France) Jonathan Eysseric, 4–6, 6–1, [10–7].
