= 2023 Delray Beach Open – Singles =

Singles
- 2023 Delray Beach Open

Final
- Champion: (United States) Taylor Fritz
- Runner-up: (Serbia) Miomir Kecmanović
- Score: 6–0, 5–7, 6–2

Details
- Draw: 28 (4 Q / 3 WC )
- Seeds: 8

Events
Singles	Doubles
- Delray Beach Open

Taylor Fritz defeated Miomir Kecmanović in the final, 6–0, 5–7, 6–2 to win the singles tennis title at the 2023 Delray Beach Open.

Cameron Norrie was the reigning champion, but chose to compete in Buenos Aires instead.

== Seeds ==
The top four seeds received a bye into the second round.

1. (United States) Taylor Fritz (champion)
2. (United States) Tommy Paul (quarterfinals)
3. (Canada) Denis Shapovalov (second round)
4. (Serbia) Miomir Kecmanović (final)
5. (Japan) Yoshihito Nishioka (second round)
6. (United States) Jenson Brooksby (withdrew)
7. (United States) John Isner (withdrew)
8. (United States) Ben Shelton (first round)
9. (United States) J. J. Wolf (second round)

== Draw ==
Key

- Q = Qualifier
- WC = Wild card
- LL = Lucky loser
- Alt = Alternate
- ITF = ITF entry
- PR = Protected ranking
- SR = Special ranking
- SE = Special exempt
- JE = Junior exempt
- JR = Junior Accelerator Programme entrant
- CO = College Accelerator Programme entrant
- NG = Next Gen Accelerator Program entrant
- w/o = Walkover
- r = Retired
- d = Defaulted

=== Finals ===
Semifinals
1	(United States) Taylor Fritz	6	7^{8}
(United States) Mackenzie McDonald	3	6^{6}
4	(Serbia) Miomir Kecmanović	7^{10}	3	6
(Moldova) Radu Albot	6^{8}	6	2

Final
1	(United States) Taylor Fritz	6	5	6
4	(Serbia) Miomir Kecmanović	0	7	2

=== Top half ===
First round
(Ecuador) E Gómez	7^{7}	6
Q	(Chinese Taipei) T-l Wu	6^{3}	4
(Germany) D Altmaier	6	3	4
(France) A Mannarino	4	6	6
I Ivashka	5	3
9	(United States) JJ Wolf	7	6
(United States) M Mmoh	6	3	6
WC	(United States) A Kovacevic	4	6	3
(Japan) T Daniel	2	2
(United States) M McDonald	6	6
(Germany) O Otte	3	6	4
5	(Japan) Y Nishioka	6	0	6

Second round
1	(United States) T Fritz	6	6
(Ecuador) E Gómez	4	3
(France) A Mannarino	7	6
9	(United States) JJ Wolf	5	2
3	(Canada) D Shapovalov	5	6	3
(United States) M Mmoh	7	3	6
(United States) M McDonald	6	3	6
5	(Japan) Y Nishioka	3	6	2

Quarterfinals
1	(United States) T Fritz	7^{10}	6
(France) A Mannarino	6^{8}	4
(United States) M Mmoh	6	3	4
(United States) M McDonald	3	6	6

Semifinals
1	(United States) T Fritz	6	7^{8}
(United States) M McDonald	3	6^{6}

=== Bottom half ===
First round
8	(United States) B Shelton	4	4
(United States) M Giron	6	6
WC	(United States) J Sock	6	2	2
Q	(Croatia) M Pecotić	4	6	6
LL	(United States) S Johnson	4	6	4
Q	(Portugal) N Borges	6	3	6
LL	(Australia) A Vukic	6^{5}	6	6
Q	(United States) C Eubanks	7^{7}	3	4
(Moldova) R Albot	7^{7}	7^{7}
WC	(Spain) F Verdasco	6^{3}	6^{1}
(Australia) J Thompson	6	4	6^{2}
(United States) D Kudla	3	6	7^{7}

Second round
(United States) M Giron	6	6
Q	(Croatia) M Pecotić	3	3
Q	(Portugal) N Borges	3	5
4	(Serbia) M Kecmanović	6	7
LL	(Australia) A Vukic	4	4
(Moldova) R Albot	6	6
(United States) D Kudla	3	4
2	(United States) T Paul	6	6

Quarterfinals
(United States) M Giron	6^{5}	3
4	(Serbia) M Kecmanović	7^{7}	6
(Moldova) R Albot	6	6
2	(United States) T Paul	2	2

Semifinals
4	(Serbia) M Kecmanović	7^{10}	3	6
(Moldova) R Albot	6^{8}	6	2

== Qualifying ==
=== Seeds ===
1. (United States) Christopher Eubanks (qualified)
2. (Portugal) Nuno Borges (qualified)
3. (Japan) Yosuke Watanuki (withdrew)
4. (Australia) Rinky Hijikata (first round)
5. (United States) Steve Johnson (qualifying competition, lucky loser)
6. (Italy) Mattia Bellucci (first round)
7. (Australia) Aleksandar Vukic (qualifying competition, lucky loser)
8. (Chinese Taipei) Wu Tung-lin (qualified)

=== Qualifiers ===
1. (United States) Christopher Eubanks
2. (Portugal) Nuno Borges
3. (Croatia) Matija Pecotić
4. (Chinese Taipei) Wu Tung-lin

=== Lucky losers ===
1. (United States) Steve Johnson
2. (Australia) Aleksandar Vukic

=== Qualifying draw ===
==== First qualifier ====
First round
1	(United States) Christopher Eubanks	6	6
(United States) Mitchell Krueger	3	4
WC	(United States) Alex Rybakov	6^{5}	6	1
7	(Australia) Aleksandar Vukic	7^{7}	4	6

Qualifying competition
1	(United States) Christopher Eubanks	7^{7}	1	6
7	(Australia) Aleksandar Vukic	6^{4}	6	4

==== Second qualifier ====
First round
2	(Portugal) Nuno Borges	6	6
Alt	(Czech Republic) Jonáš Forejtek	0	3
Alt	(Argentina) Hernán Casanova	3	7	6^{4}
5	(United States) Steve Johnson	6	5	7^{7}

Qualifying competition
2	(Portugal) Nuno Borges	6	6
5	(United States) Steve Johnson	2	2

==== Third qualifier ====
First round
Alt	(Croatia) Matija Pecotić	7^{7}	5
(United States) Stefan Kozlov	6^{1}	5^{r}
Alt	(United States) Tennys Sandgren	2	6	7^{7}
6	(Italy) Mattia Bellucci	6	1	6^{4}

Qualifying competition
Alt	(Croatia) Matija Pecotić	3	6	6
Alt	(United States) Tennys Sandgren	6	3	2

==== Fourth qualifier ====
First round
4	(Australia) Rinky Hijikata	3	6	4
WC	(United States) Evan Zhu	6	3	6
(United States) Brandon Holt	4	6	5
8	(Chinese Taipei) Wu Tung-lin	6	3	7

Qualifying competition
WC	(United States) Evan Zhu	5	2
8	(Chinese Taipei) Wu Tung-lin	7	6
