= 2015 China International Suzhou – Singles =

2015 tennis tournament

Singles
- 2015 China International Suzhou

Final
- Champion: (Israel) Dudi Sela
- Runner-up: (Croatia) Matija Pecotić
- Score: 6–1, 1–0 ret.

Events
Singles	Doubles
- China International Suzhou

The 2015 China International Suzhou was a professional tennis tournament played on hard courts. It was part of the 2015 ATP Challenger Tour and took place in Suzhou, China, from 26 to 31 October 2015.

It was the inaugural edition of the tournament. In the singles competition, Dudi Sela won the title, defeating Matija Pecotić in the final after Pecotić retired with the score at 6–1, 1–0.

== Seeds ==
1. (Chinese Taipei) Lu Yen-hsun (first round)
2. (Israel) Dudi Sela (champion)
3. (Estonia) Jürgen Zopp (second round)
4. (Italy) Thomas Fabbiano (semifinals)
5. (Germany) Peter Gojowczyk (first round)
6. (China) Zhang Ze (second round)
7. (France) Tristan Lamasine (second round)
8. (Japan) Hiroki Moriya (quarterfinals)

== Draw ==
Key

- Q = Qualifier
- WC = Wild card
- LL = Lucky loser
- Alt = Alternate
- ITF = ITF entry
- PR = Protected ranking
- SR = Special ranking
- SE = Special exempt
- JE = Junior exempt
- JR = Junior Accelerator Programme entrant
- CO = College Accelerator Programme entrant
- NG = Next Gen Accelerator Program entrant
- w/o = Walkover
- r = Retired
- d = Defaulted

=== Finals ===
Semifinals
(China) Yan Bai	2	2
(Croatia) Matija Pecotić	6	6
4	(Italy) Thomas Fabbiano	1	6	4
2	(Israel) Dudi Sela	6	1	6

Final
(Croatia) Matija Pecotić	1	0^{r}
2	(Israel) Dudi Sela	6	1

=== Top half ===
First round
1	(Chinese Taipei) Y-h Lu	1r
(China) Y Bai	3
WC	(China) Zh Zhang	7^{7}	6
(Croatia) N Mektić	6^{4}	4
(Israel) A Weintraub	6	6
WC	(China) Y He	3	4
Q	(China) Sheng Hao Zhou	2	2
8	(Japan) H Moriya	6	6
3	(Estonia) J Zopp	6	6
(Italy) F Cipolla	3	3
(Croatia) F Škugor	6	6^{5}	3
(Croatia) M Pecotić	1	7^{7}	6
(South Korea) D-h Lee	7^{7}	6
(China) D Wu	6^{5}	4
(Italy) R Ghedin	1	0
7	(France) T Lamasine	6	6

Second round
(China) Y Bai	6^{4}	6	6
WC	(China) Zh Zhang	7^{7}	1	4
(Israel) A Weintraub	6	6^{6}	4
8	(Japan) H Moriya	2	7^{8}	6
3	(Estonia) J Zopp	3	4
(Croatia) M Pecotić	6	6
(South Korea) D-h Lee	3	6	6
7	(France) T Lamasine	6	0	1

Quarterfinals
(China) Y Bai	6	6
8	(Japan) H Moriya	4	4
(Croatia) M Pecotić	5	6	7
(South Korea) D-h Lee	7	4	5

Semifinals
(China) Y Bai	2	2
(Croatia) M Pecotić	6	6

=== Bottom half ===
First round
6	(China) Ze Zhang	7	6
(Germany) D Masur	5	2
(Chinese Taipei) J Wang	3	6	6
WC	(China) X Gao	6	2	1
WC	(China) Yuqing Ning	3	5
(South Africa) T Vorster	6	7
(Ukraine) D Molchanov	6	1	6^{4}
4	(Italy) T Fabbiano	4	6	7^{7}
5	(Germany) P Gojowczyk	3	4
(Germany) N Langer	6	6
(Chinese Taipei) T-h Yang	7^{7}	6
Q	(China) Zhaoyi Cao	6^{4}	3
Q	(France) Laurent Rochette	3	6	6
(Belarus) U Ignatik	6	3	1
Q	(China) F Sun	1	1
2	(Israel) D Sela	6	6

Second round
6	(China) Ze Zhang	6	3	3
(Chinese Taipei) J Wang	2	6	6
(South Africa) T Vorster	3	4
4	(Italy) T Fabbiano	6	6
(Germany) N Langer	6	3	6
(Chinese Taipei) T-h Yang	1	6	2
Q	(France) L Rochette	1	0
2	(Israel) D Sela	6	6

Quarterfinals
(Chinese Taipei) J Wang	7^{12}	3	3
4	(Italy) T Fabbiano	6^{10}	6	6
(Germany) N Langer	3	3
2	(Israel) D Sela	6	6

Semifinals
4	(Italy) T Fabbiano	1	6	4
2	(Israel) D Sela	6	1	6
