= 2025 Delray Beach Open =

- Date: February 10–16
- Edition: 33rd
- Draw: 28S / 16D
- Surface: Hard
- Location: Delray Beach, United States
- Venue: Delray Beach Tennis Center

Champions

Singles
- (Serbia) Miomir Kecmanović

Doubles
- (Serbia) Miomir Kecmanović / (United States) Brandon Nakashima
- Delray Beach Open

The 2025 Delray Beach Open was a professional men's tennis tournament played on hard courts. It was the 33rd edition of the tournament and part of the 2025 ATP Tour. It took place in Delray Beach, United States between February 10 and February 16, 2025.

== Finals ==
=== Singles ===
- (Serbia) Miomir Kecmanović def. (Spain) Alejandro Davidovich Fokina, 3–6, 6–1, 7–5

=== Doubles ===
- (Serbia) Miomir Kecmanović / (United States) Brandon Nakashima def. (United States) Christian Harrison / (United States) Evan King, 7–6^{(7–3)}, 1–6, [10–3]

== Singles main-draw entrants ==
=== Seeds ===
Country	Player	Rank^{1}	Seed
USA	Taylor Fritz	4	1
~~USA~~	~~Tommy Paul~~	~~9~~	~~2~~
USA	Alex Michelsen	36	3
ITA	Matteo Arnaldi	39	4
USA	Marcos Giron	41	5
USA	Brandon Nakashima	42	6
SRB	Miomir Kecmanović	55	7
ESP	Alejandro Davidovich Fokina	59	8
FRA	Arthur Rinderknech	60	9

^{†} Rankings are as of 3 February 2024.

=== Other entrants ===
The following players received wildcards into the main draw:

- (United States) Mackenzie McDonald
- (United States) Reilly Opelka
- (United States) Learner Tien

The following player received entry using a protected ranking:

- (Croatia) Borna Gojo

The following players received entry from the qualifying draw:

- (United States) Tristan Boyer
- (United States) Michael Mmoh
- (United States) Zachary Svajda
- (Japan) James Trotter

The following players received entry as lucky losers:

- (Japan) Taro Daniel
- (Kazakhstan) Dmitry Popko
- (United States) Ethan Quinn

=== Withdrawals ===
- (Croatia) Borna Ćorić → replaced by (Japan) Taro Daniel
- (Canada) Gabriel Diallo → replaced by (Kazakhstan) Dmitry Popko
- (United States) Tommy Paul → replaced by (United States) Ethan Quinn

== Doubles main-draw entrants ==
=== Seeds ===
Country	Player	Country	Player	Rank^{1}	Seed
USA	Jackson Withrow	ARG	Horacio Zeballos	24	1
URU	Ariel Behar	USA	Robert Galloway	74	2
MEX	Santiago González	AUT	Lucas Miedler	92	3
IND	Sriram Balaji	MEX	Miguel Ángel Reyes-Varela	123	4

- ^{1} Rankings are as of 3 February 2025.

=== Other entrants ===
The following pairs received wildcards into the main draw:

- (United States) Tristan Boyer / (United States) Tennyson Whiting
- (United States) Ethan Quinn / (United States) Learner Tien

The following pair received entry as alternates:

- (Mexico) Hans Hach Verdugo / (Japan) James Trotter

=== Withdrawals ===
- (El Salvador) Marcelo Arévalo / (Argentina) Horacio Zeballos → replaced by (United States) Jackson Withrow / (Argentina) Horacio Zeballos
- (Australia) James Duckworth / (Australia) Aleksandar Vukic → replaced by (Mexico) Hans Hach Verdugo / (Japan) James Trotter
- (United States) Austin Krajicek / (United States) Rajeev Ram → replaced by (Brazil) Fernando Romboli / (Brazil) Marcelo Zormann
- (United States) Nathaniel Lammons / (United States) Jackson Withrow → replaced by (United States) George Goldhoff / (United States) Trey Hilderbrand
- (United Kingdom) Jamie Murray / (Australia) John Peers → replaced by (United States) Robert Cash / (United States) JJ Tracy
- (United Kingdom) Joe Salisbury / (United Kingdom) Neal Skupski → replaced by (Australia) Rinky Hijikata / (Australia) Adam Walton
