= 2016 China International Suzhou – Doubles =

Doubles
- 2016 China International Suzhou

Final
- Champions: (Russia) Mikhail Elgin (Russia) Alexander Kudryavtsev
- Runners-up: (Italy) Andrea Arnaboldi (France) Jonathan Eysseric
- Score: 4–6, 6–1, [10–7]

Events
Singles	Doubles
- China International Suzhou

Lee Hsin-han and Denys Molchanov were the defending champions but chose not to defend their title.

Mikhail Elgin and Alexander Kudryavtsev won the title after defeating Andrea Arnaboldi and Jonathan Eysseric 4–6, 6–1, [10–7] in the final.

== Seeds ==
1. (Thailand) Sanchai Ratiwatana / (Thailand) Sonchat Ratiwatana (semifinals)
2. (China) Gong Maoxin / (Chinese Taipei) Peng Hsien-yin (first round)
3. (Russia) Mikhail Elgin / (Russia) Alexander Kudryavtsev (champions)
4. (Chinese Taipei) Chen Ti / (Chinese Taipei) Yi Chu-huan (semifinals)

== Draw ==
Key

- Q = Qualifier
- WC = Wild card
- LL = Lucky loser
- Alt = Alternate
- ITF = ITF entry
- PR = Protected ranking
- SR = Special ranking
- SE = Special exempt
- JE = Junior exempt
- JR = Junior Accelerator Programme entrant
- CO = College Accelerator Programme entrant
- NG = Next Gen Accelerator Program entrant
- w/o = Walkover
- r = Retired
- d = Defaulted

First round
1	(Thailand) Sa Ratiwatana (Thailand) So Ratiwatana	6	6
(Spain) P Riba (Ukraine) S Stakhovsky	2	2
(Japan) T Matsui (Indonesia) C Rungkat	6	6
(China) X Gao (China) Z Li	3	4
3	(Russia) M Elgin (Russia) A Kudryavtsev	4	6	[10]
(United States) S Kozlov (Japan) A Santillan	6	4	[3]
WC	(China) Qi Xi (China) Z Qiu	6	6
WC	(China) Gong Ze (China) Hui Tian Xiang	3	1
(Chinese Taipei) C-p Hsieh (China) D Wu	7	6
WC	(China) Li Yuanfeng (China) R Te	5	2
(United States) M Krueger (Australia) A Whittington	3	6	[7]
4	(Chinese Taipei) T Chen (Chinese Taipei) C-h Yi	6	1	[10]
(China) Y He (China) B Ouyang	6	6
(China) Y Ning (China) F Sun	0	3
(Italy) A Arnaboldi (France) J Eysseric	7	7
2	(China) M Gong (Chinese Taipei) H-y Peng	5	5

Quarterfinals
1	(Thailand) Sa Ratiwatana (Thailand) So Ratiwatana	6	6
(Japan) T Matsui (Indonesia) C Rungkat	2	4
3	(Russia) M Elgin (Russia) A Kudryavtsev	6	6
WC	(China) X Qi (China) Z Qiu	1	2
(Chinese Taipei) C-p Hsieh (China) D Wu	6^{4}	4
4	(Chinese Taipei) T Chen (Chinese Taipei) C-h Yi	7^{7}	6
(China) Y He (China) B Ouyang	4	4
(Italy) A Arnaboldi (France) J Eysseric	6	6

Semifinals
1	(Thailand) Sa Ratiwatana (Thailand) So Ratiwatana	6^{6}	5
3	(Russia) M Elgin (Russia) A Kudryavtsev	7^{8}	7
4	(Chinese Taipei) T Chen (Chinese Taipei) C-h Yi	6	4	[6]
(Italy) A Arnaboldi (France) J Eysseric	2	6	[10]

Final
3	(Russia) M Elgin (Russia) A Kudryavtsev	4	6	[10]
(Italy) A Arnaboldi (France) J Eysseric	6	1	[7]
