= 2025 China International Suzhou =

- Date: 20 – 26 October
- Edition: 4th
- Surface: Hard
- Location: Suzhou, China

Champions

Singles
- (Japan) Yoshihito Nishioka

Doubles
- (Australia) Blake Bayldon / (Chinese Taipei) Ray Ho
← 2017 ·	China International Suzhou	· 2026 →

The 2025 China International Suzhou was a professional tennis tournament played on hardcourts. It was the fourth edition of the tournament which was part of the 2025 ATP Challenger Tour. It took place in Suzhou, China between 20 and 26 October 2025.

== Singles main draw entrants ==
=== Seeds ===
Country	Player	Rank^{1}	Seed
JPN	Yoshihito Nishioka	154	1
HKG	Coleman Wong	158	2
POR	Henrique Rocha	161	3
~~AUS~~	~~Bernard Tomic~~	~~181~~	~~4~~
FRA	Harold Mayot	182	5
AUS	Jason Kubler	186	6
AUS	James McCabe	195	7
JPN	Sho Shimabukuro	212	8
JPN	Yuta Shimizu	213	9

- ^{1} Rankings are as of 13 October 2025.

=== Other entrants ===
The following players received wildcards into the singles main draw:

- (China) Mo Yecong
- (China) Te Rigele
- (China) Wang Aoran

The following player received entry into the singles main draw using a protected ranking:

- (Chinese Taipei) Jason Jung

The following player received entry into the singles main draw through the Junior Accelerator programme:

- (Japan) Naoya Honda

The following player received entry into the singles main draw as an alternate:

- (Croatia) Duje Ajduković

The following players received entry from the qualifying draw:

- (Chinese Taipei) Huang Tsung-hao
- (Japan) Takuya Kumasaka
- (Uzbekistan) Khumoyun Sultanov
- (Japan) Yusuke Takahashi
- (Chinese Taipei) Wu Tung-lin
- Maxim Zhukov

The following player received entry as a lucky loser:

- (Uzbekistan) Sergey Fomin

== Champions ==
=== Singles ===
- (Japan) Yoshihito Nishioka def. (France) Harold Mayot 6–4, 6–4.

=== Doubles ===
- (Australia) Blake Bayldon / (Chinese Taipei) Ray Ho def. (India) S D Prajwal Dev / (India) Nitin Kumar Sinha 6–4, 6–3.
