= 2022 Delray Beach Open – Singles =

Singles
- 2022 Delray Beach Open

Final
- Champion: (United Kingdom) Cameron Norrie
- Runner-up: (United States) Reilly Opelka
- Score: 7–6^{(7–1)}, 7–6^{(7–4)}

Details
- Draw: 28 (4 Q / 3 WC )
- Seeds: 8

Events
| Singles | Doubles |
- Delray Beach Open

Cameron Norrie defeated Reilly Opelka in the final, 7–6^{(7–1)}, 7–6^{(7–4)} to win the singles title at the 2022 Delray Beach Open.

Hubert Hurkacz was the defending champion, but chose not to defend his title.

== Seeds ==
The top four seeds received a bye into the second round.

1. (United Kingdom) Cameron Norrie (champion)
2. (United States) Reilly Opelka (final)
3. (Bulgaria) Grigor Dimitrov (quarterfinals)
4. (United States) Tommy Paul (semifinals)
5. (United States) Sebastian Korda (quarterfinals)
6. (United States) Jenson Brooksby (withdrew)
7. (France) Adrian Mannarino (quarterfinals)
8. (United States) Maxime Cressy (first round)

== Draw ==
Key

- Q = Qualifier
- WC = Wild card
- LL = Lucky loser
- Alt = Alternate
- ITF = ITF entry
- PR = Protected ranking
- SR = Special ranking
- SE = Special exempt
- JE = Junior exempt
- JR = Junior Accelerator Programme entrant
- CO = College Accelerator Programme entrant
- NG = Next Gen Accelerator Program entrant
- w/o = Walkover
- r = Retired
- d = Defaulted

=== Finals ===
Semifinals
1 | (United Kingdom) Cameron Norrie | 6 | 6
4/WC | (United States) Tommy Paul | 3 | 3
(Australia) John Millman | 6^{8} | 7^{7} | 6^{4}
2 | (United States) Reilly Opelka | 7^{10} | 6^{3} | 7^{7}

Final
1 | (United Kingdom) Cameron Norrie | 7^{7} | 7^{7}
2 | (United States) Reilly Opelka | 6^{1} | 6^{4}

=== Top half ===
First round
(Germany) O Otte | 7^{10} | 6
(Japan) Y Nishioka | 6^{8} | 3
(Germany) P Gojowczyk | 5 | 4
(Italy) A Seppi | 7 | 6
(Australia) T Kokkinakis | 4 | 1
5 | (United States) S Korda | 6 | 6
Q | (Uzbekistan) D Istomin | 6 | 7^{7}
(United States) S Querrey | 1 | 6^{5}
(United States) S Johnson | 6 | 6^{5} | 6
(South Africa) K Anderson | 2 | 7^{7} | 2
Q | (United States) S Kozlov | 4 | 7 | 6
LL | (Ecuador) E Gómez | 6 | 5 | 3

Second round
1 | (United Kingdom) C Norrie | 6 | 7
(Germany) O Otte | 3 | 5
(Italy) A Seppi | 5 | 3
5 | (United States) S Korda | 7 | 6
4/WC | (United States) T Paul | 6 | 6
Q | (Uzbekistan) D Istomin | 2 | 0
(United States) S Johnson | 1 | 3
Q | (United States) S Kozlov | 6 | 6

Quarterfinals
1 | (United Kingdom) C Norrie | 6 | 1 | 7^{7}
5 | (United States) S Korda | 2 | 6 | 6^{4}
4/WC | (United States) T Paul | 6 | 6
Q | (United States) S Kozlov | 3 | 1

Semifinals
1 | (United Kingdom) C Norrie | 6 | 6
4/WC | (United States) T Paul | 3 | 3

=== Bottom half ===
First round
8 | (United States) M Cressy | 7^{7} | 6^{2} | 6^{3}
(Australia) J Millman | 6^{2} | 7^{7} | 7^{7}
(United States) T Sandgren | 5 | 3
(United States) M Giron | 7 | 6
(Australia) J Thompson | 2 | 4
Q | (United States) M Krueger | 6 | 6
7 | (France) A Mannarino | 6 | 6
Q | (United Kingdom) L Broady | 2 | 3
(United States) B Nakashima | 6 | 6
(United States) D Kudla | 1 | 1
WC | (United States) J Sock | 2 | 6 | 6
(Germany) D Altmaier | 6 | 3 | 4

Second round
(Australia) J Millman | 6 | 7^{8}
(United States) M Giron | 3 | 6^{6}
Q | (United States) M Krueger | 6^{4} | 3
3/WC | (Bulgaria) G Dimitrov | 7^{7} | 6
7 | (France) A Mannarino | 6 | 2 | 7
(United States) B Nakashima | 4 | 6 | 5
WC | (United States) J Sock | 7^{8} | 6^{4} | 1
2 | (United States) R Opelka | 6^{6} | 7^{7} | 6

Quarterfinals
(Australia) J Millman | 6 | 6
3/WC | (Bulgaria) G Dimitrov | 4 | 4
7 | (France) A Mannarino | 6^{2} | 6 | 1
2 | (United States) R Opelka | 7^{7} | 3 | 6

Semifinals
(Australia) J Millman | 6^{8} | 7^{7} | 6^{4}
2 | (United States) R Opelka | 7^{10} | 6^{3} | 7^{7}

== Qualifying ==
=== Seeds ===
1. (United Kingdom) Liam Broady (qualified)
2. (United States) Ernesto Escobedo (qualifying competition, retired)
3. (Ecuador) Emilio Gómez (qualifying competition, Lucky loser)
4. (United States) Stefan Kozlov (qualified)
5. (Austria) Jurij Rodionov (first round)
6. (United States) Bjorn Fratangelo (qualifying competition, retired)
7. (United States) Mitchell Krueger (qualified)
8. (Chinese Taipei) Jason Jung (qualifying competition)

=== Qualifiers ===
1. (United Kingdom) Liam Broady
2. (United States) Mitchell Krueger
3. (Uzbekistan) Denis Istomin
4. (United States) Stefan Kozlov

=== Lucky loser ===
1. (Ecuador) Emilio Gómez

=== Qualifying draw ===
==== First qualifier ====
First round
1 | (United Kingdom) Liam Broady | 6 | 7^{7}
PR | (Germany) Cedrik-Marcel Stebe | 1 | 6^{4}
Alt | (Argentina) Renzo Olivo | 2 | 3
8 | (Chinese Taipei) Jason Jung | 6 | 6

Qualifying competition
1 | (United Kingdom) Liam Broady | 6 | 6
8 | (Chinese Taipei) Jason Jung | 4 | 4

==== Second qualifier ====
First round
2 | (United States) Ernesto Escobedo | 6 | 7^{7}
PR | (United States) J. J. Wolf | 4 | 6^{5}
(Kazakhstan) Dmitry Popko | 4 | 5
7 | (United States) Mitchell Krueger | 6 | 7

Qualifying competition
2 | (United States) Ernesto Escobedo | 6 | 4 | 0^{r}
7 | (United States) Mitchell Krueger | 1 | 6 | 0

==== Third qualifier ====
First round
3 | (Ecuador) Emilio Gómez | 6 | 6
WC | (United States) Victor Lilov | 1 | 3
Alt | (Uzbekistan) Denis Istomin | 6 | 6
5 | (Austria) Jurij Rodionov | 4 | 2

Qualifying competition
3 | (Ecuador) Emilio Gómez | 6^{7} | 2
Alt | (Uzbekistan) Denis Istomin | 7^{9} | 6

==== Fourth qualifier ====
First round
4 | (United States) Stefan Kozlov | 7 | 6
PR | (Japan) Go Soeda | 5 | 2
WC | (United States) Bruno Kuzuhara | 1 | 5
6 | (United States) Bjorn Fratangelo | 6 | 7

Qualifying competition
4 | (United States) Stefan Kozlov | 6 | 1
6 | (United States) Bjorn Fratangelo | 3 | 0^{r}
