= 2017 China International Suzhou – Singles =

Singles
- 2017 China International Suzhou

Final
- Champion: (Serbia) Miomir Kecmanović
- Runner-up: (Moldova) Radu Albot
- Score: 6–4, 6–4

Events
| Singles | Doubles |
- China International Suzhou

Lu Yen-hsun was the defending champion but withdrew before the tournament began.

Miomir Kecmanović won the title after defeating Radu Albot 6–4, 6–4 in the final.

== Seeds ==
1. (Chinese Taipei) Lu Yen-hsun (withdrew)
2. (Slovenia) Blaž Kavčič (semifinals)
3. (Moldova) Radu Albot (final)
4. (Brazil) Thiago Monteiro (quarterfinals)
5. (Spain) Adrián Menéndez Maceiras (quarterfinals)
6. (France) Calvin Hemery (first round)
7. (South Korea) Lee Duck-hee (first round)
8. (China) Zhang Ze (semifinals)
9. (China) Wu Di (quarterfinals)

== Draw ==
Key

- Q = Qualifier
- WC = Wild card
- LL = Lucky loser
- Alt = Alternate
- ITF = ITF entry
- PR = Protected ranking
- SR = Special ranking
- SE = Special exempt
- JE = Junior exempt
- JR = Junior Accelerator Programme entrant
- CO = College Accelerator Programme entrant
- NG = Next Gen Accelerator Program entrant
- w/o = Walkover
- r = Retired
- d = Defaulted

=== Finals ===
Semifinals
(Serbia) Miomir Kecmanović | 7^{7} | 6
8 | (China) Zhang Ze | 6^{1} | 3
3 | (Moldova) Radu Albot | 4 | 6 | 6
2 | (Slovenia) Blaž Kavčič | 6 | 3 | 0

Final
(Serbia) Miomir Kecmanović | 6 | 6
3 | (Moldova) Radu Albot | 4 | 4

=== Top half ===
First round
9 | (China) D Wu | 6 | 6
LL | (China) Y Bai | 1 | 2
(China) Zh Zhang | 6 | 6
Q | (India) Sidharth Rawat | 3 | 3
(Russia) R Safiullin | 3 | 4
(Japan) H Moriya | 6 | 6
(Serbia) M Kecmanović | 6 | 6
6 | (France) C Hemery | 2 | 1
4 | (Brazil) T Monteiro | 7^{7} | 3 | 4
WC | (China) F Sun | 6^{5} | 6 | 3^{r}
Q | (Netherlands) Miliaan Niesten | 6 | 6
WC | (China) Zeng Shi Hong | 4 | 1
(Serbia) D Petrović | 6 | 6
WC | (China) Xia Zihao | 2 | 3
Q | (Italy) R Ghedin | 3 | 5
8 | (China) Ze Zhang | 6 | 7

Second round
9 | (China) D Wu | 6 | 3 | 6
(China) Zh Zhang | 3 | 6 | 3
(Japan) H Moriya | 3 | 2
(Serbia) M Kecmanović | 6 | 6
4 | (Brazil) T Monteiro | 6 | 6
Q | (Netherlands) M Niesten | 3 | 2
(Serbia) D Petrović | 7 | 4 | 2
8 | (China) Ze Zhang | 5 | 6 | 6

Quarterfinals
9 | (China) D Wu | 3 | 1
(Serbia) M Kecmanović | 6 | 6
4 | (Brazil) T Monteiro | 4 | 3
8 | (China) Ze Zhang | 6 | 6

Semifinals
(Serbia) M Kecmanović | 7^{7} | 6
8 | (China) Ze Zhang | 6^{1} | 3

=== Bottom half ===
First round
5 | (Spain) A Menéndez Maceiras | 6 | 6
(China) Z Li | 3 | 2
(Sweden) M Eriksson | 2 | 6 | 6
Q | (China) R Te | 6 | 1 | 2
(Japan) K Uchida | 6 | 6
(China) C Wang | 4 | 3
(India) V Vardhan | 1 | 1
3 | (Moldova) R Albot | 6 | 6
7 | (South Korea) D-h Lee | 6 | 4 | 6^{3}
(Poland) H Hurkacz | 4 | 6 | 7^{7}
(France) S Doumbia | 6 | 4 | 6
(Belarus) Y Shyla | 2 | 6 | 2
(Italy) Lorenzo Frigerio | 4 | 4
WC | (China) X Gao | 6 | 6
(India) S Balaji | 2 | 4
2 | (Slovenia) B Kavčič | 6 | 6

Second round
5 | (Spain) A Menéndez Maceiras | 6 | 7
(Sweden) M Eriksson | 4 | 5
(Japan) K Uchida | 3 | 5
3 | (Moldova) R Albot | 6 | 7
(Poland) H Hurkacz | 7^{9} | 6
(France) S Doumbia | 6^{7} | 1
WC | (China) X Gao | 0 | 2
2 | (Slovenia) B Kavčič | 6 | 6

Quarterfinals
5 | (Spain) A Menéndez Maceiras | 4 | 3
3 | (Moldova) R Albot | 6 | 6
(Poland) H Hurkacz | 5 | 6 | 6^{4}
2 | (Slovenia) B Kavčič | 7 | 0 | 7^{7}

Semifinals
3 | (Moldova) R Albot | 4 | 6 | 6
2 | (Slovenia) B Kavčič | 6 | 3 | 0
