= 2025 Delray Beach Open – Singles =

Singles
- 2025 Delray Beach Open

Final
- Champion: (Serbia) Miomir Kecmanović
- Runner-up: (Spain) Alejandro Davidovich Fokina
- Score: 3–6, 6–1, 7–5

Details
- Draw: 28 (4 Q / 3 WC )
- Seeds: 8

Events
Singles	Doubles
- Delray Beach Open

Miomir Kecmanović defeated Alejandro Davidovich Fokina in the final, 3–6, 6–1, 7–5 to win the singles tennis title at the 2025 Delray Beach Open. He saved two championship points en route to his second ATP Tour title, and his first since 2020.

Taylor Fritz was the two-time defending champion, but lost in the quarterfinals to Davidovich Fokina.

== Seeds ==
The top four seeds received a bye into the second round.

1. (United States) Taylor Fritz (quarterfinals)
2. (United States) Tommy Paul (withdrew)
3. (United States) Alex Michelsen (semifinals)
4. (Italy) Matteo Arnaldi (semifinals)
5. (United States) Marcos Giron (quarterfinals)
6. (United States) Brandon Nakashima (quarterfinals)
7. (Serbia) Miomir Kecmanović (champion)
8. (Spain) Alejandro Davidovich Fokina (final)
9. (France) Arthur Rinderknech (second round)

== Draw ==
Key

- Q = Qualifier
- WC = Wild card
- LL = Lucky loser
- Alt = Alternate
- ITF = ITF entry
- PR = Protected ranking
- SR = Special ranking
- SE = Special exempt
- JE = Junior exempt
- JR = Junior Accelerator Programme entrant
- CO = College Accelerator Programme entrant
- NG = Next Gen Accelerator Program entrant
- w/o = Walkover
- r = Retired
- d = Defaulted

=== Finals ===
Semifinals
8	(Spain) Alejandro Davidovich Fokina	6	6
4	(Italy) Matteo Arnaldi	4	4
3	(United States) Alex Michelsen	6^{3}	3
7	(Serbia) Miomir Kecmanović	7^{7}	6

Final
8	(Spain) Alejandro Davidovich Fokina	6	1	5
7	(Serbia) Miomir Kecmanović	3	6	7

=== Top half ===
First round
(China) Y Bu	6	6
(Australia) R Hijikata	2	0
(Japan) K Nishikori	6^{4}	6	5
WC	(United States) M McDonald	7^{7}	4	7
LL	(Japan) T Daniel	2	6^{2}
8	(Spain) A Davidovich Fokina	6	7^{7}
WC	(United States) L Tien	6	6
(Australia) A Walton	4	3
(United States) C Eubanks	3	6^{7}
WC	(United States) R Opelka	6	7^{9}
Q	(Japan) J Trotter	6^{2}	1
6	(United States) B Nakashima	7^{7}	6

Second round
1	(United States) T Fritz	7^{7}	6
(China) Y Bu	6^{4}	2
WC	(United States) M McDonald	2	7	0
8	(Spain) A Davidovich Fokina	6	5	6
4	(Italy) M Arnaldi	7^{7}	4	7^{7}
WC	(United States) L Tien	6^{4}	6	6^{1}
WC	(United States) R Opelka	6	5	2
6	(United States) B Nakashima	3	7	6

Quarterfinals
1	(United States) T Fritz	6^{4}	6^{5}
8	(Spain) A Davidovich Fokina	7^{7}	7^{7}
4	(Italy) M Arnaldi	7^{7}	6
6	(United States) B Nakashima	6^{2}	4

Semifinals
8	(Spain) A Davidovich Fokina	6	6
4	(Italy) M Arnaldi	4	4

=== Bottom half ===
First round
9	(France) A Rinderknech	6	6
LL	(Kazakhstan) D Popko	2	4
Q	(United States) Z Svajda	5	4
(United Kingdom) C Norrie	7	6
(Kazakhstan) A Shevchenko	5	6^{5}
Q	(United States) M Mmoh	7	7^{7}
7	(Serbia) M Kecmanović	6	6
PR	(Croatia) B Gojo	4	4
(Japan) Y Nishioka	6	6
(Australia) A Vukic	3	4
LL	(United States) E Quinn	6	6^{5}	7^{7}
Q	(United States) T Boyer	2	7^{7}	6^{2}

Second round
9	(France) A Rinderknech	6^{9}	2
(United Kingdom) C Norrie	7^{11}	6
Q	(United States) M Mmoh	7^{10}	0^{r}
3	(United States) A Michelsen	6^{8}	3
7	(Serbia) M Kecmanović	w/o
(Japan) Y Nishioka
LL	(United States) E Quinn	3	4
5	(United States) M Giron	6	6

Quarterfinals
(United Kingdom) C Norrie	6^{3}	5
3	(United States) A Michelsen	7^{7}	7
7	(Serbia) M Kecmanović	2	6	6
5	(United States) M Giron	6	4	2

Semifinals
3	(United States) A Michelsen	6^{3}	3
7	(Serbia) M Kecmanović	7^{7}	6

== Qualifying ==
=== Seeds ===
1. (United States) Tristan Boyer (qualified)
2. (Japan) Taro Daniel (qualifying competition, lucky loser)
3. (Argentina) Federico Agustín Gómez (first round)
4. (Chile) Tomás Barrios Vera (first round)
5. (United States) Mitchell Krueger (first round)
6. (Moldova) Radu Albot (first round)
7. (United States) Zachary Svajda (qualified)
8. (Japan) James Trotter (qualified)

=== Qualifiers ===
1. (United States) Tristan Boyer
2. (Japan) James Trotter
3. (United States) Michael Mmoh
4. (United States) Zachary Svajda

=== Lucky losers ===
1. (United States) Ethan Quinn
2. (Japan) Taro Daniel
3. (Kazakhstan) Dmitry Popko

=== Qualifying draw ===
==== First qualifier ====
First round
1	(United States) Tristan Boyer	2
WC	(United States) J. J. Wolf	1^{r}
Alt	(United States) Murphy Cassone	7	2	7^{7}
5	(United States) Mitchell Krueger	5	6	6^{5}

Qualifying competition
1	(United States) Tristan Boyer	6	6
Alt	(United States) Murphy Cassone	4	2

==== Second qualifier ====
First round
2	(Japan) Taro Daniel	7^{8}	4
Alt	(Canada) Liam Draxl	6^{6}	0^{r}
Alt	(United States) Ryan Seggerman	1	3
8	(Japan) James Trotter	6	6

Qualifying competition
2	(Japan) Taro Daniel	7^{7}	5	3
8	(Japan) James Trotter	6^{4}	7	6

==== Third qualifier ====
First round
3	(Argentina) Federico Agustín Gómez	6	3	6^{4}
(Kazakhstan) Dmitry Popko	2	6	7^{7}
WC	(United States) Michael Mmoh	7^{7}	4	6
6	(Moldova) Radu Albot	6^{4}	6	3

Qualifying competition
(Kazakhstan) Dmitry Popko	6^{5}	0
WC	(United States) Michael Mmoh	7^{7}	6

==== Fourth qualifier ====
First round
4	(Chile) Tomás Barrios Vera	2	6	3
(United States) Ethan Quinn	6	4	6
Alt	(United States) Stefan Kozlov	3	0
7	(United States) Zachary Svajda	6	6

Qualifying competition
(United States) Ethan Quinn	6^{1}	3
7	(United States) Zachary Svajda	7^{7}	6
