= 2025 Delray Beach Open – Doubles =

Doubles
- 2025 Delray Beach Open

Final
- Champions: (Serbia) Miomir Kecmanović (United States) Brandon Nakashima
- Runners-up: (United States) Christian Harrison (United States) Evan King
- Score: 7–6^{(7–3)}, 1–6, [10–3]

Events
Singles	Doubles
- Delray Beach Open

Miomir Kecmanović and Brandon Nakashima defeated Christian Harrison and Evan King in the final, 7–6^{(7–3)}, 1–6, [10–3] to win the doubles tennis title at the 2025 Delray Beach Open. It was the first ATP Tour doubles title for Nakashima and second for Kecmanović. They saved two match points en route, in their quarterfinal match against Rinky Hijikata and Adam Walton.

Julian Cash and Robert Galloway were the reigning champions, but Cash chose not to participate this year. Galloway partnered Ariel Behar, but lost in the quarterfinals to Harrison and King.

== Seeds ==
1. (United States) Jackson Withrow / (Argentina) Horacio Zeballos (first round)
2. (Uruguay) Ariel Behar / (United States) Robert Galloway (quarterfinals)
3. (Mexico) Santiago González / (Austria) Lucas Miedler (first round)
4. (India) Sriram Balaji / (Mexico) Miguel Ángel Reyes-Varela (quarterfinals)

== Draw ==
Key

- Q = Qualifier
- WC = Wild card
- LL = Lucky loser
- Alt = Alternate
- ITF = ITF entry
- PR = Protected ranking
- SR = Special ranking
- SE = Special exempt
- JE = Junior exempt
- JR = Junior Accelerator Programme entrant
- CO = College Accelerator Programme entrant
- NG = Next Gen Accelerator Program entrant
- w/o = Walkover
- r = Retired
- d = Defaulted

=== Draw ===
First round
1	(United States) J Withrow (Argentina) H Zeballos	4	7	[7]
(Australia) R Hijikata (Australia) A Walton	6	5	[10]
WC	(United States) T Boyer (United States) T Whiting	1	3
(Serbia) M Kecmanović (United States) B Nakashima	6	6
3	(Mexico) S González (Austria) L Miedler	4	6^{4}
(United States) R Cash (United States) JJ Tracy	6	7^{7}
(Brazil) F Romboli (Brazil) M Zormann	6^{4}	6^{5}
(Colombia) N Barrientos (India) RC Bollipalli	7^{7}	7^{7}
(United States) R Seggerman (Australia) J-P Smith	3	6^{4}
(United States) M McDonald (United States) A Michelsen	6	7^{7}
WC	(United States) E Quinn (United States) L Tien	6	2	[4]
4	(India) S Balaji (Mexico) MÁ Reyes-Varela	3	6	[10]
Alt	(Mexico) H Hach Verdugo (Japan) J Trotter	6	1	[4]
(United States) C Harrison (United States) E King	3	6	[10]
(United States) G Goldhoff (United States) T Hilderbrand	2	4
2	(Uruguay) A Behar (United States) R Galloway	6	6

Quarterfinals
(Australia) R Hijikata (Australia) A Walton	6	6^{9}	[6]
(Serbia) M Kecmanović (United States) B Nakashima	4	7^{11}	[10]
(United States) R Cash (United States) JJ Tracy	7^{7}	4	[10]
(Colombia) N Barrientos (India) RC Bollipalli	6^{4}	6	[2]
(United States) M McDonald (United States) A Michelsen	7^{7}	6
4	(India) S Balaji (Mexico) MÁ Reyes-Varela	6^{5}	4
(United States) C Harrison (United States) E King	7	6^{7}	[10]
2	(Uruguay) A Behar (United States) R Galloway	5	7^{9}	[5]

Semifinals
(Serbia) M Kecmanović (United States) B Nakashima	4	6	[10]
(United States) R Cash (United States) JJ Tracy	6	3	[2]
(United States) M McDonald (United States) A Michelsen	6	1	[4]
(United States) C Harrison (United States) E King	4	6	[10]

Final
(Serbia) M Kecmanović (United States) B Nakashima	7^{7}	1	[10]
(United States) C Harrison (United States) E King	6^{3}	6	[3]
