= 2017 China International Suzhou =

- Date: 23 October – 29 October
- Edition: 3rd
- Draw: 32S / 16D
- Surface: Hard
- Location: Suzhou, China

Champions

Singles
- (Serbia) Miomir Kecmanović

Doubles
- (China) Gao Xin / (China) Sun Fajing
- China International Suzhou

The 2017 China International Suzhou was a professional tennis tournament played on hard courts. It was the third edition of the tournament which was part of the 2017 ATP Challenger Tour. It took place in Suzhou, China from October 23 to October 29, 2017.

== Singles main-draw entrants ==
=== Seeds ===
Country	Player	Rank^{1}	Seed
~~TPE~~	~~Lu Yen-hsun~~	~~60~~	~~1~~
SLO	Blaž Kavčič	105	2
MDA	Radu Albot	109	3
BRA	Thiago Monteiro	125	4
ESP	Adrián Menéndez Maceiras	127	5
FRA	Calvin Hemery	178	6
KOR	Lee Duck-hee	185	7
CHN	Zhang Ze	222	8
CHN	Wu Di	234	9

- Rankings are as of 16 October 2017.

=== Other entrants ===
The following players received wildcards into the singles main draw:

- (China) Gao Xin
- (China) Sun Fajing
- (China) Xia Zihao
- (China) Zeng Shi Hong

The following players received entry from the qualifying draw:

- (Italy) Riccardo Ghedin
- (Netherlands) Miliaan Niesten
- (India) Sidharth Rawat
- (China) Te Rigele

The following player received entry as a lucky loser:

- (China) Bai Yan

== Champions ==
=== Singles ===
- (Serbia) Miomir Kecmanović def. (Moldova) Radu Albot 6–4, 6–4

=== Doubles ===
- (China) Gao Xin / (China) Sun Fajing def. (China) Gong Maoxin / (China) Zhang Ze 7–6^{(7–5)}, 4–6, [10–7]
