= 2022 Delray Beach Open – Doubles =

Doubles
- 2022 Delray Beach Open

Final
- Champions: (El Salvador) Marcelo Arévalo (Netherlands) Jean-Julien Rojer
- Runners-up: (Kazakhstan) Aleksandr Nedovyesov (Pakistan) Aisam-ul-Haq Qureshi
- Score: 6–2, 6–7^{(5–7)}, [10–4]

Details
- Draw: 16
- Seeds: 4

Events
Singles	Doubles
- Delray Beach Open

Ariel Behar and Gonzalo Escobar were the defending champions but chose to play in Rio de Janeiro instead.

Marcelo Arévalo and Jean-Julien Rojer won the title, defeating Aleksandr Nedovyesov and Aisam-ul-Haq Qureshi in the final, 6–2, 6–7^{(5–7)}, [10–4].

== Seeds ==
1. (El Salvador) Marcelo Arévalo / (Netherlands) Jean-Julien Rojer (champions)
2. (United States) Austin Krajicek / (Monaco) Hugo Nys (quarterfinals)
3. (Kazakhstan) Aleksandr Nedovyesov / (Pakistan) Aisam-ul-Haq Qureshi (final)
4. (Australia) Luke Saville / (Australia) John-Patrick Smith (quarterfinals)

== Draw ==
Key

- Q = Qualifier
- WC = Wild card
- LL = Lucky loser
- Alt = Alternate
- ITF = ITF entry
- PR = Protected ranking
- SR = Special ranking
- SE = Special exempt
- JE = Junior exempt
- JR = Junior Accelerator Programme entrant
- CO = College Accelerator Programme entrant
- NG = Next Gen Accelerator Program entrant
- w/o = Walkover
- r = Retired
- d = Defaulted

=== Draw ===
First round
1	(El Salvador) M Arévalo (Netherlands) J-J Rojer	6	6
(Mexico) MÁ Reyes-Varela (United States) M Schnur	2	3
(United States) E King (United States) B Nakashima	4	7^{8}	[4]
PR	(Philippines) T Huey (United States) D Kudla	6	6^{6}	[10]
4	(Australia) L Saville (Australia) J-P Smith	6	6
(Germany) P Gojowczyk (Germany) O Otte	3	0
(United States) M Giron (Mexico) H Hach Verdugo	5	7^{7}	[13]
(Serbia) I Sabanov (Serbia) M Sabanov	7	6^{1}	[11]
(United States) N Monroe (United States) J Withrow	6	6
Alt	(United States) Jack Vance (United States) Jamie Vance	3	4
(United States) W Blumberg (United States) T Paul	5	7^{8}	[8]
3	(Kazakhstan) A Nedovyesov (Pakistan) A-u-H Qureshi	7	6^{6}	[10]
WC	(United States) R Galloway (United States) A Lawson	6	7
(Sweden) A Göransson (United States) N Lammons	3	5
(United Kingdom) L Glasspool (Finland) H Heliövaara	6^{11}	5
2	(United States) A Krajicek (Monaco) H Nys	7^{13}	7

Quarterfinals
1	(El Salvador) M Arévalo (Netherlands) J-J Rojer	w/o
PR	(Philippines) T Huey (United States) D Kudla
4	(Australia) L Saville (Australia) J-P Smith	6	3	[8]
(United States) M Giron (Mexico) H Hach Verdugo	3	6	[10]
(United States) N Monroe (United States) J Withrow	6^{4}	5
3	(Kazakhstan) A Nedovyesov (Pakistan) A-u-H Qureshi	7^{7}	7
WC	(United States) R Galloway (United States) A Lawson	6	3	[11]
2	(United States) A Krajicek (Monaco) H Nys	3	6	[9]

Semifinals
1	(El Salvador) M Arévalo (Netherlands) J-J Rojer	6	6
(United States) M Giron (Mexico) H Hach Verdugo	3	4
3	(Kazakhstan) A Nedovyesov (Pakistan) A-u-H Qureshi	6	6^{5}	[10]
WC	(United States) R Galloway (United States) A Lawson	3	7^{7}	[4]

Final
1	(El Salvador) M Arévalo (Netherlands) J-J Rojer	6	6^{5}	[10]
3	(Kazakhstan) A Nedovyesov (Pakistan) A-u-H Qureshi	2	7^{7}	[4]
