= 2022 Delray Beach Open =

- Date: February 14–21
- Edition: 30th
- Draw: 28S / 16D
- Prize money: $664,275
- Surface: Hard
- Location: Delray Beach, United States
- Venue: Delray Beach Tennis Center

Champions

Singles
- (United Kingdom) Cameron Norrie

Doubles
- (El Salvador) Marcelo Arévalo / (Netherlands) Jean-Julien Rojer
- Delray Beach Open

The 2022 Delray Beach Open (officially known as 2022 Delray Beach Open by VITACOST.com for sponsorship reasons) was a professional men's tennis tournament played on hard courts. It was the 30th edition of the tournament, and it was part of the 2022 ATP Tour. It took place in Delray Beach, United States between February 14 and February 20, 2022. This was the first edition where an exhibition mixed doubles event was played. First-seeded Cameron Norrie won the singles title.

== Finals ==
=== Singles ===
- (United Kingdom) Cameron Norrie defeated (United States) Reilly Opelka, 7–6^{(7–1)}, 7–6^{(7–4)}

=== Doubles ===
- (El Salvador) Marcelo Arévalo / (Netherlands) Jean-Julien Rojer defeated (Kazakhstan) Aleksandr Nedovyesov / (Pakistan) Aisam-ul-Haq Qureshi, 6–2, 6–7^{(5–7)}, [10–4]

== Point and prize money ==
=== Point distribution ===
Event	W	F	SF	QF	Round of 16	Round of 32	Q	Q2	Q1
Singles	250	150	90	45	20	0	12	6	0
Doubles	250	150	90	45	0	—N/a	—N/a	—N/a	—N/a

=== Prize money ===
Event	W	F	SF	QF	Round of 16	Round of 32	Q2	Q1
Singles	$90,330	$52,690	$30,980	$17,950	$10,425	$6,370	$3,185	$1,735
Doubles*	$31,380	$16,790	$9,840	$5,510	$3,240	—N/a	—N/a	—N/a

_{*per team}

== Singles main-draw entrants ==
=== Seeds ===
Country	Player	Rank^{1}	Seed
GBR	Cameron Norrie	13	1
USA	Reilly Opelka	23	2
BUL	Grigor Dimitrov	25	3
USA	Tommy Paul	43	4
USA	Sebastian Korda	44	5
~~USA~~	~~Jenson Brooksby~~	~~54~~	~~6~~
FRA	Adrian Mannarino	57	7
USA	Maxime Cressy	59	8

^{†} Rankings are as of 7 February 2022.

=== Other entrants ===
The following players received wildcards into the main draw:

- (Bulgaria) Grigor Dimitrov
- (United States) Tommy Paul
- (United States) Jack Sock

The following players received entry from qualifying draw:

- (United Kingdom) Liam Broady
- (Uzbekistan) Denis Istomin
- (United States) Stefan Kozlov
- (United States) Mitchell Krueger

The following player received entry as a lucky loser :

- (Ecuador) Emilio Gómez

=== Withdrawals ===
Before the tournament

- (United States) Jenson Brooksby → replaced by (Ecuador) Emilio Gómez
- (Australia) James Duckworth → replaced by (Australia) Thanasi Kokkinakis
- (Japan) Kei Nishikori → replaced by (United States) Steve Johnson
- (United States) Frances Tiafoe → replaced by (United States) Denis Kudla

== Doubles main-draw entrants ==
=== Seeds ===
Country	Player	Country	Player	Rank^{1}	Seed
ESA	Marcelo Arévalo	NED	Jean-Julien Rojer	65	1
USA	Austin Krajicek	MON	Hugo Nys	96	2
KAZ	Aleksandr Nedovyesov	PAK	Aisam-ul-Haq Qureshi	115	3
AUS	Luke Saville	AUS	John-Patrick Smith	115	4

- ^{1} Rankings are as of 7 February 2022.

=== Other entrants ===
The following pairs received wildcards into the main draw:

- (United States) Robert Galloway / (United States) Alex Lawson
- ~~(Australia) Thanasi Kokkinakis / (Australia) Jordan Thompson~~

The following pair received entry into the doubles main draw as alternates:

- (United States) Jack Vance / (United States) Jamie Vance

=== Withdrawals ===
Before the tournament

- (Australia) Thanasi Kokkinakis / (Australia) Jordan Thompson → replaced by (United States) Jack Vance / (United States) Jamie Vance
