= Matija Pecotić =

Croatian tennis player

Matijo Pecotić
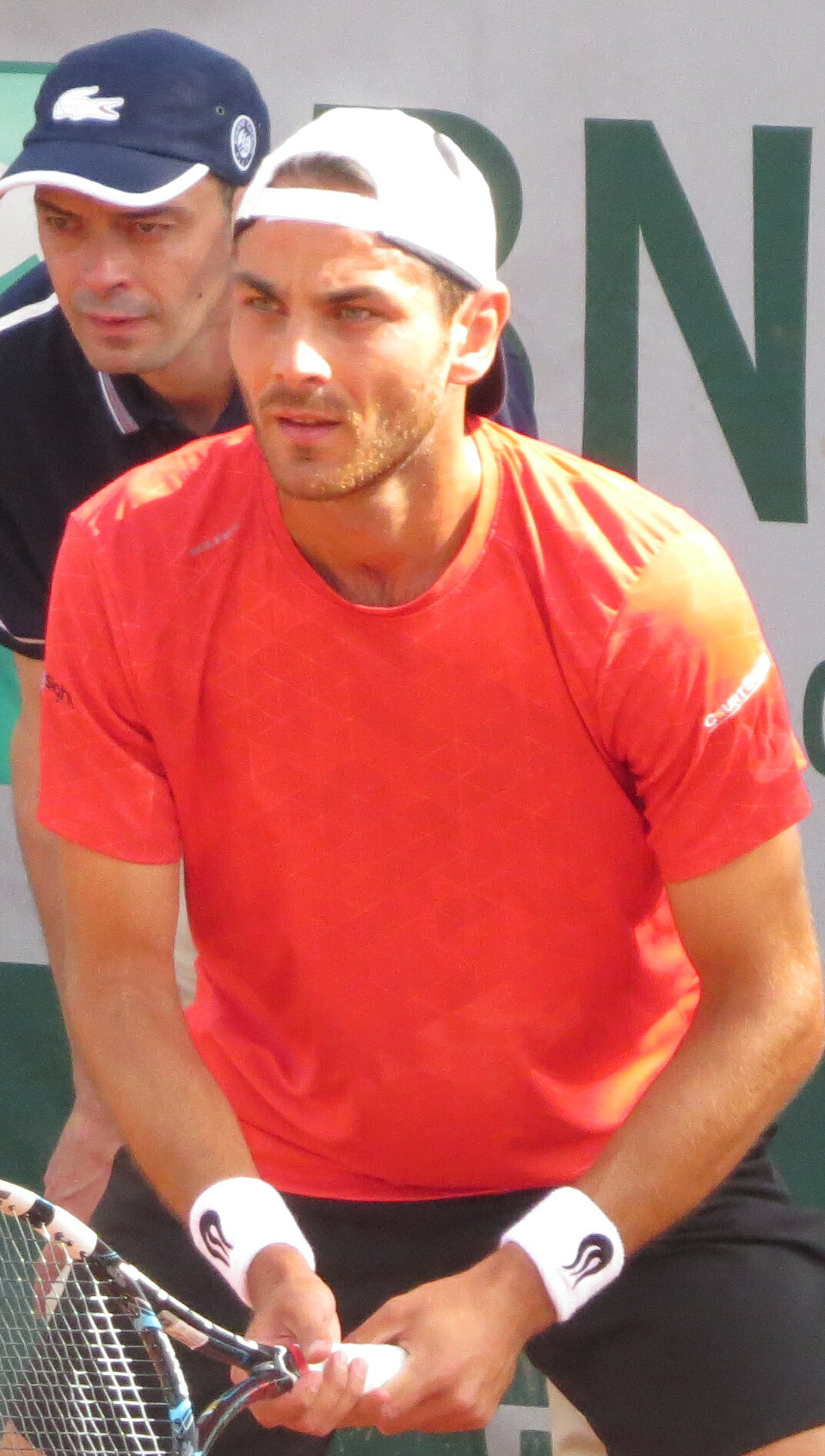
- Pecotić at the 2017 French Open
- Country (sports): Croatia
- Residence: Malta, USA
- Born: 3 July 1989 (age 37) Belgrade, Yugoslavia
- Height: 1.88 m (6 ft 2 in)
- Turned pro: 2013
- Plays: Left-handed (two-handed backhand)
- Coach: Alfred Dimech, Lovro Roncevic, Carlos Aranda
- Prize money: US $148,013

Singles
- Career record: 1–1 (at ATP Tour level, Grand Slam level, and in Davis Cup)
- Career titles: 0
- Highest ranking: No. 206 (23 November 2015)

Grand Slam singles results
- Australian Open: Q1 (2017)
- French Open: Q2 (2017)
- Wimbledon: Q1 (2017)
- US Open: Q1 (2016)

Doubles
- Career record: 0–0 (at ATP Tour level, Grand Slam level, and in Davis Cup)
- Career titles: 0
- Highest ranking: No. 485 (16 November 2015)
- Last updated on: 10 June 2024.

Matija Pecotić (born 3 July 1989) is a Croatian tennis player. He has a career high ATP singles ranking of No. 206 achieved on 23 November 2015 and a career high ATP doubles ranking of No. 485 achieved on 16 November 2015. Pecotić has won 12 ITF titles, 10 singles and 2 doubles.

== Personal life ==
Pecotić was born in Belgrade, Yugoslavia and moved to Malta at the age of 3, where he picked up tennis.

During his time off due to an injury suffered in 2016, Pecotić applied and was accepted to Harvard Business School, which he attended from 2017 to 2019, earning an MBA at the completion of his studies.

In 2021, Pecotić began working for a private equity/real estate development firm in West Palm Beach, Florida, USA, but continued to play tournaments that were close by.

== College career ==
He played college tennis at Princeton University, where he became the most winning player in program history. He was also the captain of the tennis team, Princeton's first All-American since 1984, and the first-ever and only three-time Ivy League Player of the Year. Pecotic played as the No. 1 player for Princeton, and became the first player from Princeton since 1984 to reach the semifinals of the All-American tournament.

== Professional career ==
=== 2014–16 ===
In January 2014, Pecotic joined the professional tour.

In less than 24 months, he climbed to world No. 206 but was sidelined by an injury that kept him out for most of 2016.

=== 2019 ===
Pecotić returned to the ATP Tour in August 2019, and put up a 46–8 W/L Record to return to the top 300, but did not play for most of 2021 due to the COVID-19 pandemic.

=== 2022 ===
In 2022, he only played three events, beating Stefano Travaglia 6–0 6–1 in the qualifications of the ATP event in Umag, Croatia as a wildcard.

=== 2023: ATP debut and first ATP win ===
In 2023, he debuted for the Croatia national team at the 2023 United Cup in Perth, Australia but did not play any singles matches. He played one match in doubles with Petra Marčinko. Team Croatia beat Argentina (5–0) and France (3–2) but lost to Greece.

At 33, ranked No. 784 he qualified for his first main draw at the 2023 Delray Beach Open as an alternate defeating two Americans Stefan Kozlov and Tennys Sandgren. As a result, he moved more than a 100 positions in the rankings. He defeated a third American, former top-10 player Jack Sock in the first round, his first ATP win ever. In the round of 16 he lost to American Marcos Giron. He moved another 100 positions into the top 600.

He accepted a wildcard for the qualifications at the 2023 U.S. Men's Clay Court Championships in Houston.

== Singles performance timeline ==
Current through the 2023 ATP Tour.

Tournament	2014	2015	2016	2017	2018	2019	2020	2021	2022	2023	W–L
Grand Slam tournaments
Australian Open	A	A	A	Q1	A	A	A	A	A	A	0–0
French Open	A	A	A	Q2	A	A	A	A	A	A	0–0
Wimbledon	A	A	A	Q1	A	A	NH	A	A	A	0–0
US Open	A	A	Q1	A	A	A	A	A	A	A	0–0
Career statistics
Tournaments	0	0	0	0	0	0	0	0	0	1	1
Overall win–loss	0–0	0–0	0–0	0–0	0–0	0–0	0–0	0–0	0–0	1–1	1–1
Year-end ranking	590	207	523	1056	–	396	337	481	831	402	

== Challenger and Futures/World Tennis Finals ==
=== Singles: 16 (10–6) ===
Legend (singles) ATP Challenger Tour (0–2) ITF Futures Tour/World Tennis Tour (10–4)	Titles by surface Hard (9–5) Clay (1–1) Grass (0–0) Carpet (0–0)

Result	W–L	Date	Tournament	Tier	Surface	Opponent	Score
Loss	0–1	Jul 2014	Turkey F24, Istanbul	Futures	Hard	(Monaco) Hugo Nys	6–7^{(5–7)}, 6–3, 6–7^{(4–7)}
Loss	0–2	Mar 2015	Great Britain F4, Wirral	Futures	Hard (i)	(Belgium) Yannick Mertens	2–6, 4–6
Win	1–2	May 2015	Nigeria F1, Abuja	Futures	Hard	(United States) Deiton Baughman	6–3, 6–4
Win	2–2	May 2015	Nigeria F2, Abuja	Futures	Hard	(United States) Eric Quigley	7–5, 6–3
Win	3–2	Jun 2015	USA F16, Winston-Salem	Futures	Hard	(United States) Tennys Sandgren	6–2, 6–3
Win	4–2	Sep 2015	Turkey F36, Antalya	Futures	Hard	(Italy) Matteo Berrettini	6–7^{(6–8)}, 7–6^{(7–4)}, 6–2
Loss	4–3	Nov 2015	Suzhou, China	Challenger	Hard	(Israel) Dudi Sela	1–6, 0–1, ret.
Win	5–3	May 2019	M15, Cancún, Mexico	World Tennis Tour	Hard	(Argentina) Camilo Ugo Carabelli	6–2, 6–1
Win	6–3	Sep 2019	M15, Cancún, Mexico	World Tennis Tour	Hard	(United States) Christian Langmo	6–3, 6–3
Win	7–3	Oct 2019	M25, Jounieh, Lebanon	World Tennis Tour	Clay	(France) Maxime Chazal	6–1, 4–6, 6–2
Win	8–3	Nov 2019	M15, Monastir, Tunisia	World Tennis Tour	Hard	(Turkey) Altuğ Çelikbilek	6–1, 6–1
Win	9–3	Dec 2019	M15, Heraklion, Greece	World Tennis Tour	Hard	(Ukraine) Artem Smirnov	6–3, 7–5
Win	10–3	Feb 2020	M25, Nonthaburi, Thailand	World Tennis Tour	Hard	(Uzbekistan) Khumoyun Sultanov	6–1, 3–6, 6–2
Loss	10–4	Nov 2020	M15, Heraklion, Greece	World Tennis Tour	Hard	(France) Evan Furness	3–6, 6–1, 3–6
Loss	10–5	May 2023	M15, Orange Park, USA	World Tennis Tour	Clay	(Dominican Republic) Roberto Cid Subervi	6–0, 3–6, 2–6
Loss	10–6	Jul 2023	Salinas, Ecuador	Challenger	Hard	(Ukraine) Illya Marchenko	4–6, 4–6
