= China International Suzhou =

Tennis tournament in Suzhou, China

- 2025 China International Suzhou

ATP Challenger Tour
- Location: Suzhou, China
- Venue: Sungent International Tennis Center
- Category: ATP Challenger Tour
- Surface: Hard
- Draw: 32S/16Q/16D
- Prize money: US$100,000 (2025), $75,000

The China International Suzhou is a professional tennis tournament played on outdoor hardcourts. It is part of the ATP Challenger Tour. It is held annually in Suzhou, China, from 2015 until 2017 and starting again in 2025 when it came back on the Challenger Tour.

== Past finals ==
=== Singles ===
Year	Champion	Runner-up	Score
2026	Not Held		
2025	(Japan) Yoshihito Nishioka	(France) Harold Mayot	6–4, 6–4
2018–24	Not held		
2017	(Serbia) Miomir Kecmanović	(Moldova) Radu Albot	6–4, 6–4
2016	(Chinese Taipei) Lu Yen-hsun	(United States) Stefan Kozlov	6–0, 6–1
2015	(Israel) Dudi Sela	(Croatia) Matija Pecotić	6–1, 1–0 ret.

=== Doubles ===
Year	Champions	Runners-up	Score
2026	Not Held		
2025	(Australia) Blake Bayldon (Chinese Taipei) Ray Ho	(India) S D Prajwal Dev (India) Nitin Kumar Sinha	6–4, 6–3
2018–24	Not held		
2017	(China) Gao Xin (China) Sun Fajing	(China) Gong Maoxin (China) Zhang Ze	7–6^{(7–5)}, 4–6, [10–7]
2016	(Russia) Mikhail Elgin (Russia) Alexander Kudryavtsev	(Italy) Andrea Arnaboldi (France) Jonathan Eysseric	4–6, 6–1, [10–7]
2015	(Chinese Taipei) Lee Hsin-han (Ukraine) Denys Molchanov	(China) Gong Maoxin (Chinese Taipei) Peng Hsien-yin	3–6, 7–6^{(7–5)}, [10–4]
