= Miomir Kecmanović =

Serbian tennis player

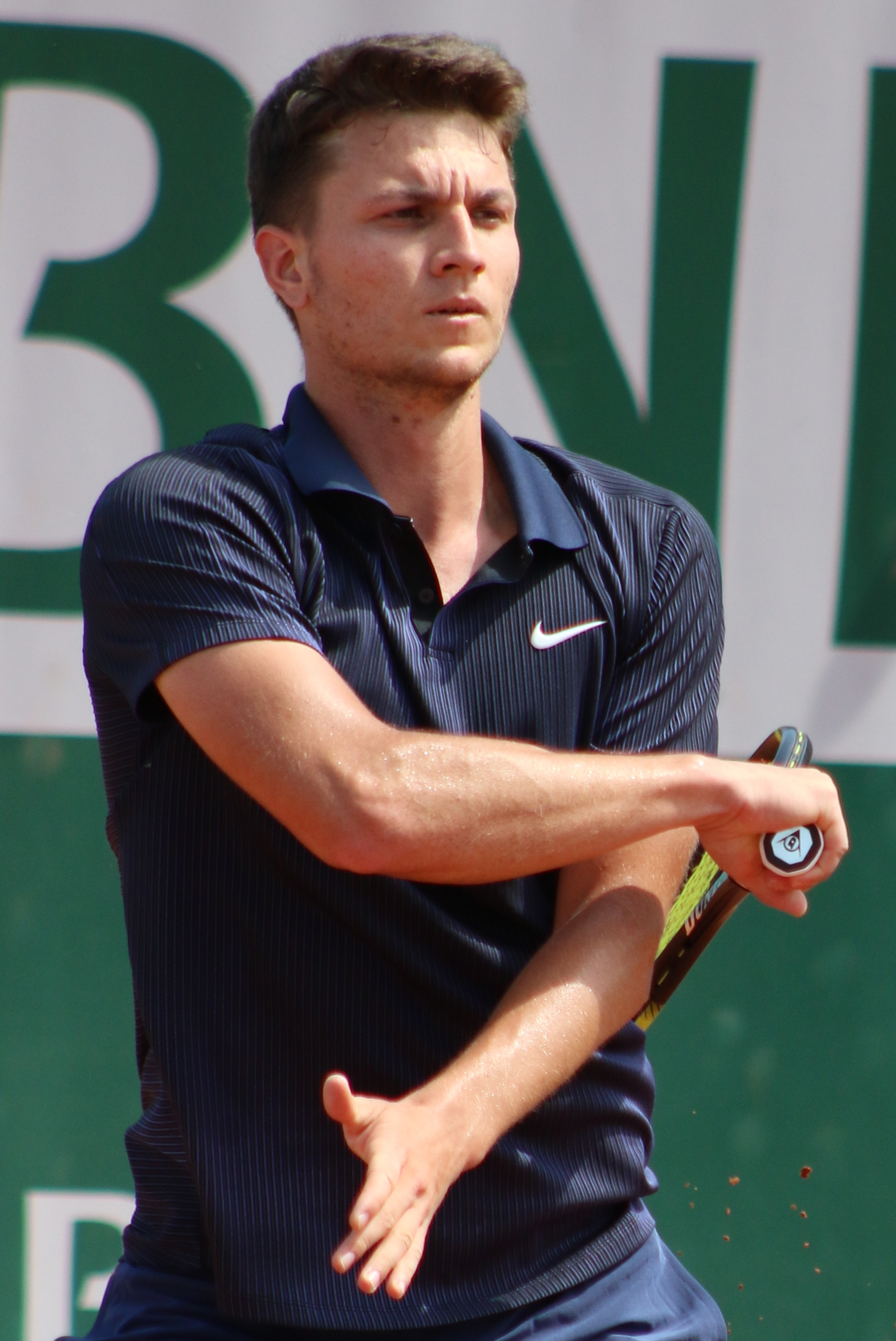
- Kecmanović at the 2021 French Open
- Country (sports): Serbia
- Residence: Dubai, United Arab Emirates
- Born: 31 August 1999 (age 27) Belgrade, Serbia, FR Yugoslavia
- Height: 1.83 m (6 ft 0 in)
- Turned pro: 2017
- Plays: Right-handed (two-handed backhand)
- Coach: Miro Hrvatin (2017–2020); David Nalbandian (2021–2022); Johan Örtegren (2022); Wayne Black (2023); Ivan Cinkuš (2023–2024); Viktor Troicki (2025–); Ognjen Jovanovic
- Prize money: US $10,180,955

Singles
- Career record: 187–203 (48.5%)
- Career titles: 2
- Highest ranking: No. 27 (16 January 2023)
- Current ranking: No. 64 (9 November 2026)

Grand Slam singles results
- Australian Open: 4R (2022, 2024)
- French Open: 3R (2022)
- Wimbledon: 3R (2022, 2024, 2025)
- US Open: 2R (2019, 2020, 2022, 2024)

Other tournaments
- Olympic Games: 2R (2021)

Doubles
- Career record: 33–52 (40%)
- Career titles: 2
- Highest ranking: No. 127 (24 April 2023)

Grand Slam doubles results
- Australian Open: 2R (2021)
- French Open: 2R (2019, 2022)
- US Open: 3R (2019)

Team competitions
- Davis Cup: 12–8 (Sin. 8–5, Dbs. 4–3)
- Last updated on: 12 November 2026.

Miomir Kecmanović (Serbian Cyrillic: Миомир Кецмановић, pronounced [mǐomir ketsmǎːnovitɕ]; born 31 August 1999) is a Serbian professional tennis player. He reached his best singles ranking of world No. 27 on 16 January 2023, and peaked at world No. 127 on 24 April 2023 in doubles. Kecmanović has won two ATP titles both in singles and doubles. He is currently the No. 2 Serbian player.

== Career ==
=== Juniors: Orange Bowl champion & junior No. 1 ===
In December 2015, Kecmanović won the Orange Bowl in a 3-set match against Stefanos Tsitsipas from Greece, 6–3, 2–6, 7–6^{(5)}. He reached the final in singles at 2016 Junior US Open where he was defeated by Canadian Félix Auger-Aliassime. He finished the year 2016 as ITF Juniors number 1 ranked tennis player.

=== 2016: Davis Cup alternate player ===
Kecmanović was a fifth (reserve) player on a Serbian Davis Cup team in their quarterfinal tie against Great Britain in the 2016 Davis Cup – a standard practice of Tennis Federation of Serbia for each tie to invite a different talented young player to practice with regular players and gain necessary experience. Kecmanović credited this experience for finishing the year as junior world No. 1 and said that he is looking forward to one day make the team and play for Serbia.

=== 2017: Turning pro & first Challenger title ===
In January 2017, Kecmanović won his first singles ITF pro circuit title in Sunrise, Florida, US. In March, he received a wild card entry for the qualifying draw at Miami Masters and defeated 22nd seed and world No. 117 Henri Laaksonen in straight sets in the first round, before losing the deciding qualifying match to 11th seed and world No. 114 Lukáš Lacko. Serbian Davis Cup captain, Nenad Zimonjić, planned to include Kecmanović as a fifth player for Serbia's 7–9 April Davis Cup quarterfinal tie versus Spain, but as Kecmanović received a wild card for Panamá Cup Challenger, he instead chose to play in his first career challenger and lost in the first round to top seed and world No. 86 Horacio Zeballos in 3 sets, 6–2, 4–6, 2–6. He next played in San Luis Potosí Challenger in Mexico and had his first wins on the Challenger level after defeating 3rd seed and world No. 135 Stefan Kozlov in straight sets, Emilio Gómez in three sets and 7th seed Marcelo Arévalo in straight sets, before losing in the semifinals to 8th seed Adrián Menéndez Maceiras. At Sarasota Kecmanović played in his third successive challenger, losing in the second round to 7th seed and world No. 114 Laaksonen. Kecmanović received a wild card for the qualifying draw of another ATP tournament, Istanbul Open, where he defeated 2nd seed Mirza Bašić in the opening round, but lost to 8th seed Daniel Brands in the deciding qualifier.

Between May and July, Kecmanović played in four futures tournaments in Turkey and Belgium, respectively, winning two and reaching another final and one semifinal. He then resumed playing in challengers, playing three in Asia, with the best result coming in August in Chengdu, where he was stopped in the quarterfinals. In September, Kecmanović was again in the plans to be a fifth player in 15–17 September Davis Cup semifinal against France, but as he received a wildcard for Banja Luka Challenger, he chose to play it in order to improve his ATP ranking, and again lost in the first round. He next played three futures in Italy, getting to one semifinal and two quarterfinals. He finished the season playing in three challengers in China and had his biggest achievement to date in October in Suzhou, when he won the first challenger title of his career by beating 3rd seed and world No. 113 Radu Albot, 6–4, 6–4, in the final.

=== 2018: Top 150, WTT champion & Finals MVP ===
After reaching two quarterfinals in three challengers to start the season, Kecmanović broke into the top 200 for the first time in his career on 5 February, when he was ranked 194th on the ATP list. In March, he made his ATP main draw debut when he was granted wild card for Miami Masters, losing to Denis Istomin in the first round. In April, he defeated 4th seed Michael Mmoh and 6th seed Dennis Novikov in the qualifying rounds to reach the main draw of U.S. Men's Clay Court Championships ATP 250 event in Houston, where he lost to 7th seed Ryan Harrison in the first round.

In July and August, Kecmanović played World TeamTennis league and helped Springfield Lasers win its first ever championship after losing five times in the finals between 1999 and 2014. They defeated Philadelphia Freedoms, 19–18 in the final, after Kecmanović rallied from a 1–3 deficit in the final set to defeat Kevin King, 5–3, and earn Finals MVP honors.

On the strength of three semifinal and one quarterfinal appearance in challenger events in September and October, Kecmanović reached the top 150 for the first time on 22 October, being ranked world No. 149. He closed out the season on a high note, reaching the final of the Liuzhou challenger and winning the Shenzhen challenger, to finish the season with a then career-high ranking of world No. 132.

=== 2019: Major & Top 50 debuts, first ATP final & Top 10 win ===
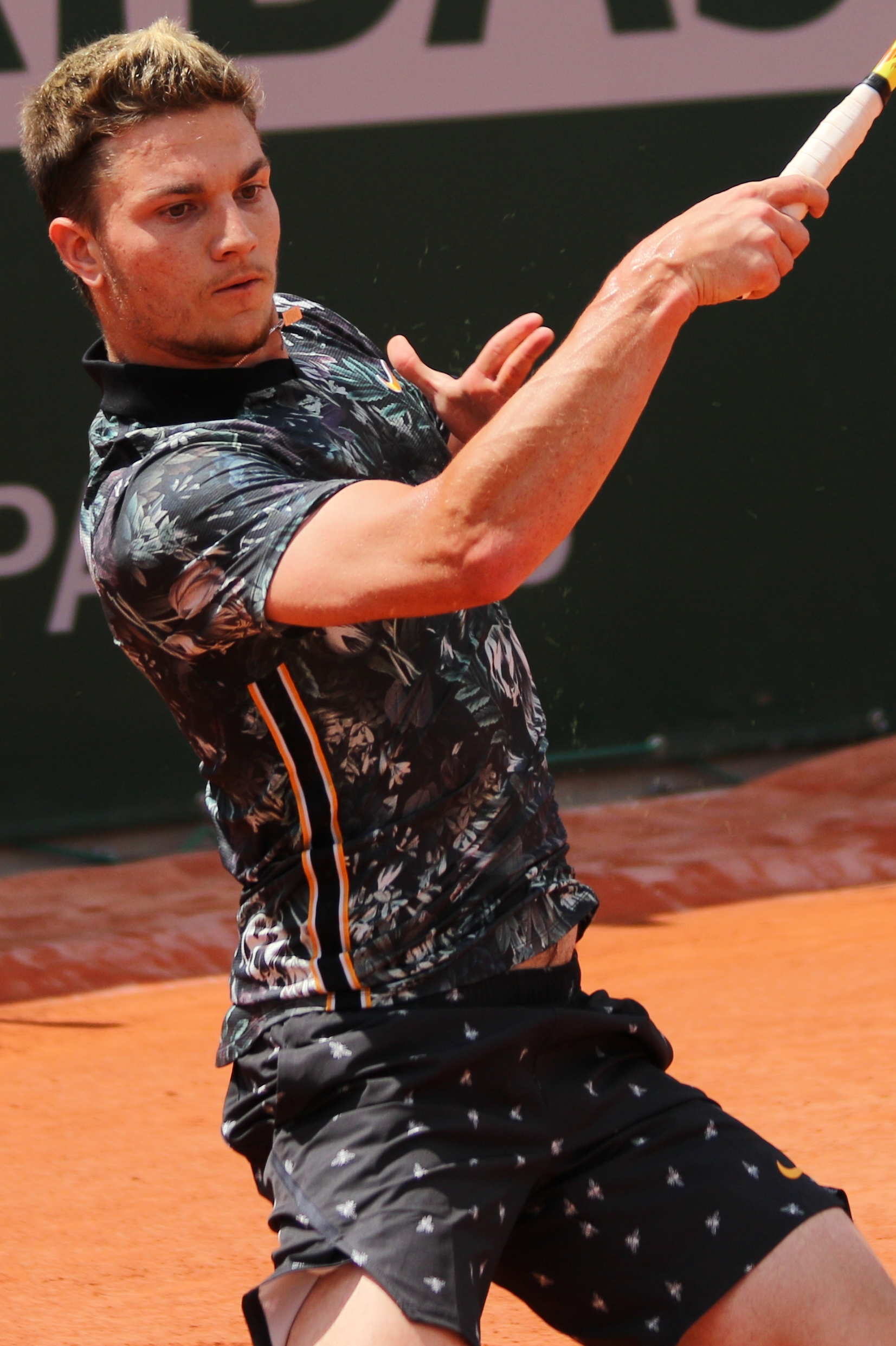
Kecmanovic at the 2019 French Open

He earned his first ATP victory by defeating world No. 56 Leonardo Mayer at the Brisbane International. He qualified for his first Grand Slam main draw at the 2019 Australian Open. He played in the BNP Paribas Open as a lucky loser. He defeated 30th seed Laslo Djere on his way to the quarterfinals, before losing to in straight sets to Milos Raonic. This result meant that Kecmanović was ranked in the top 100 for the first time. In Miami, he beat former top-10 player Ernests Gulbis in the first round before losing to Frances Tiafoe in two tiebreak sets.

At the French Open, Kecmanović played in the main draw, beating Denis Kudla in five sets before losing to David Goffin, his first Grand Slam win. At the Antalya Open, he reached his first ATP final, losing to Lorenzo Sonego in the final. His semifinal against third seed Jordan Thompson was notable for featuring no breaks of serve, with Kecmanović saving all three break points on his serve.

Kecmanović won his first Wimbledon match at The Championships 2019, beating Roberto Carballés Baena in four sets, before retiring against Benoît Paire two sets to love down. In Atlanta, he beat Jack Sock and 8th seed Ugo Humbert both in straight sets, before losing in the quarterfinals to eventual finalist and second seed Taylor Fritz. At the Citi DC Open, he beat Alexei Popyrin and Pierre-Hugues Herbert before losing to Norbert Gombos. Having missed the Roger's Cup Masters Tournament, Kecmanović's breakthrough came at the Western and Southern Open. In the qualifying rounds, he beat Antoine Hoang and Feliciano López in straight sets. In the first round, he beat fellow 19 year old Félix Auger-Aliassime in straight sets. He then recorded his first Top-10 win by beating seventh seed Alexander Zverev in three sets. This victory ensured that Kecmanović would break into the top 50 for the first time. He then lost in straight sets to Roberto Bautista Agut.

=== 2020: First ATP title ===
Kecmanović started off the new decade by participating in the ATP 250 2020 Qatar ExxonMobil Open. He defeated Australian Jordan Thompson before defeating third seed Jo-Wilfried Tsonga in the round of sixteen.

In September, he won his first ATP title at the 2020 Generali Open Kitzbühel by beating Yannick Hanfmann in straight sets in the final.

=== 2021: Top 40 debut ===
After reaching the second round at the Australian Open, losing to Adrian Mannarino, and following a semifinal run at the 2021 Argentina Open, Kecmanović achieved his best singles ranking of world No. 38 on 8 March 2021. During the Latin American Swing, he hired former World No. 3 player David Nalbandian as his coach for a trial period.

=== 2022: Australian Open fourth round, top 30 ===
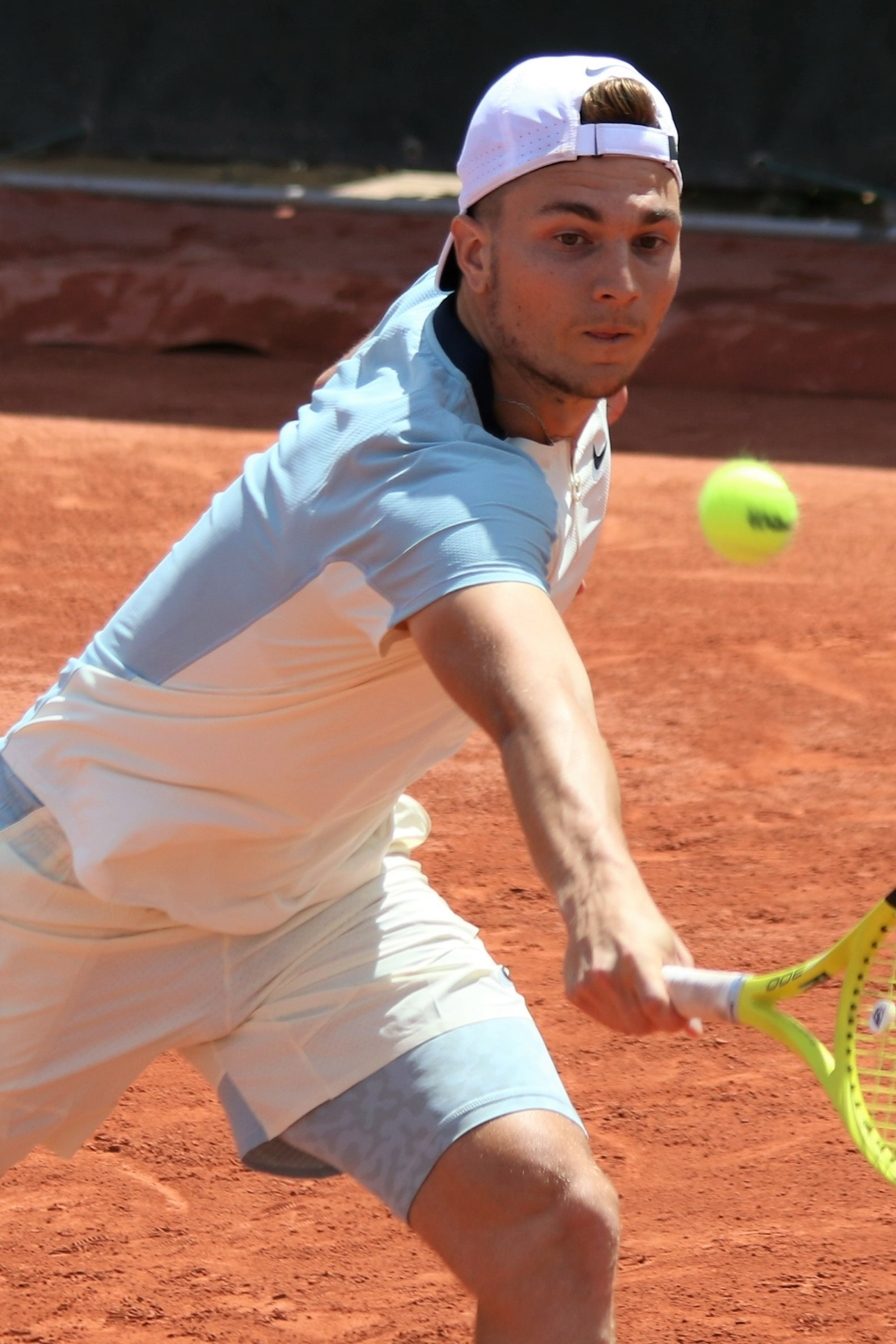
Kecmanović at the 2022 French Open

Kecmanović was initially set to play Novak Djokovic in the Australian Open. Due to Djokovic's visa issues and his COVID-19 vaccination status, that ultimately led to his deportation, Kecmanović instead faced Salvatore Caruso who was promoted to Djokovic's original position as a lucky loser. Kecmanovic defeated Caruso in straight sets, and advanced to the second round. Next he defeated Tommy Paul in straight sets and Lorenzo Sonego to make his first fourth round at a Major, which is his best result at a Grand Slam. He lost to 17th seed Gaël Monfils in straight sets in the fourth round. At the 2022 Rio Open he reached the quarterfinals as a qualifier defeating sixth seed Lorenzo Sonego. He lost to Francisco Cerúndolo in a second consecutive match, the first loss coming at the previous tournament, the 2022 Argentina Open.

At the BNP Paribas Open, Kecmanović reached his 2nd career Masters 1000 quarterfinal. He defeated Liam Broady, 24th seed Marin Čilić, Botic van de Zandschulp, and 6th seed Matteo Berrettini, earning the second Top 10 win of his career. He lost in the quarterfinals in three sets to eventual champion Taylor Fritz.

The following week at the Miami Open, Kecmanović reached his 2nd consecutive Masters 1000 quarterfinal and 3rd overall. He defeated Jack Sock, 7th seed and 9th ranked Félix Auger-Aliassime for his third Top 10 win, Sebastian Korda, and 11th seed Taylor Fritz in a rematch of the previous week's Indian Wells quarterfinal. He lost to eventual champion Carlos Alcaraz in the quarterfinal in a final set tie-breaker. Due to this result, Kecmanović tied his career high ranking of World No. 38. He made his debut in the top 30 on 13 June 2022 following a third round showing for the first time in his career at the 2022 French Open.

At Wimbledon, he beat Alejandro Tabilo and John Millman in the first two rounds before losing to the number 1 seed and eventual champion Novak Djokovic in the third round.

=== 2023: Delray & Estoril finals, 100th career win ===
In January, in Adelaide, Miomir won in the first round by beating Christopher O'Connell in straight sets. In the round of 16, he lost to third seed Daniil Medvedev. The following week, at the Adelaide International 2, he beat Kyle Edmund in the first round, Jason Kubler in the second round, before being beaten in three sets by the defending champion, Thanasi Kokkinakis. With this result, Kecmanovic reached his career best singles ranking at No. 27 on 16 January 2023. At the Australian Open, seeded No. 26, he surprisingly lost in the first round against Chilean Nicolás Jarry.

In February, Kecmanovic, as the fourth seed, reached his first final of the year at Delray Beach Open with wins over Nuno Borges and Marcos Giron, both in straight sets, and in the semifinals he scored his 100th ATP tour victory by defeating Radu Albot. In the final, Kecmanovic lost in three sets to the top seed Taylor Fritz.

In Estoril he reached his second final of the season defeating Luca Nardi, Jurij Rodionov, Bernabé Zapata Miralles and Marco Cecchinato before losing to top seed Casper Ruud. In April, he reached the semifinals of Banja Luka, where he defeated Abedallah Shelbayh in the second round in straight sets and Jiří Lehečka in the quarterfinals, again in straight sets, before losing to compatriot and eventual champion Dušan Lajović in three tight sets, after exactly 3 hours of play.

In July, seeded fourth Kecmanovic reached his fourth ATP semifinal of the season at the Swiss Open Gstaad. He defeated Dominic Stricker in the second round, Zizou Bergs in the quarterfinals, before losing to Albert Ramos Viñolas in the semifinals.

In September, during the Davis Cup Finals in Valencia, Kecmanovic was paired in doubles with Nikola Ćaćić and it was Serbian Davis Cup team that emerged victorious against South Korean pair Song Min-kyu and Nam Ji-sung, same duo they fell to last year. In the tie against Spain, paired again with Nikola Ćaćić, they won in straight sets against Alejandro Davidovich Fokina and Marcel Granollers, helping Serbia win the tie 3:0 and reach the Davis Cup quarterfinals. Later in the month, at the Chengdu Open Kecmanovic reached the quarterfinals. In the first round, he beat Benjamin Lock in straight sets. In the second round, he ousted Corentin Moutet, again in straight sets, before blowing to the top seed and eventual champion Alexander Zverev, in three tight sets.

In October, Kecmanovic reached the semifinals of the Stockholm Open, defeating Karl Friberg in the first round, top seed and defending champion Holger Rune in the second and Elias Ymer in the quarterfinals, all in straight sets. In the semifinals, he lost to Pavel Kotov.

=== 2025: Delray Beach singles and doubles titles ===
In February, Kecmanovic won both singles and doubles title at Delray Beach Open. In singles, he lifted the trophy after saving two match points and winning the last five games in a three set match victory against Alejandro Davidovich Fokina. In doubles, he teamed up with Brandon Nakashima to win a title in a three set match against American duo Christian Harrison and Evan King. With this win, Kecmanovic became only the fourth ATP player to win the event's singles and doubles titles after Xavier Malisse (2007), Jan-Michael Gambill (2001), and Todd Woodbridge (1995). He is also the first Serbian to claim both titles at the same ATP Tour event and the first overall since Australian Jordan Thompson achieved the feat in Los Cabos (2024).

== Personal life ==
Miomir Kecmanović was born in Belgrade on 31 August 1999, to Dragutin Kecmanović and Maja Pavlov, both physicians who specialize in general and abdominal surgery. Kecmanović began playing tennis at the age of 6 with his maternal grandfather, Jovan Pavlov, who was a general in the Yugoslav People's Army. His paternal grandfather was Prof. Miomir Kecmanović, after whom Miomir was named, who played a crucial role in suppressing the 1972 Yugoslav smallpox outbreak. Growing up, his tennis idols were Roger Federer and Novak Djokovic. At age 13, he moved to Florida, US with his aunt, Tanja Pavlov, a psychologist, to train at the IMG Academy. His aunt also acted as his manager.

== Performance timelines ==
Key
W	F	SF	QF	#R	RR	Q#	DNQ	A	NH

(W) winner; (F) finalist; (SF) semifinalist; (QF) quarterfinalist; (#R) rounds 4, 3, 2, 1; (RR) round-robin stage; (Q#) qualification round; (DNQ) did not qualify; (A) absent; (NH) not held; (SR) strike rate (events won / competed); (W–L) win–loss record.
To avoid confusion and double counting, these charts are updated at the conclusion of a tournament or when the player's participation has ended.

=== Singles ===
Tournament	2016	2017	2018	2019	2020	2021	2022	2023	2024	2025	2026	SR	W–L	Win %
Grand Slam tournaments
Australian Open	A	A	Q1	1R	1R	2R	4R	1R	4R	3R	1R	0 / 8	9–8	56%
French Open	A	A	Q2	2R	1R	2R	3R	1R	2R	2R	2R	0 / 8	7–8	46%
Wimbledon	A	A	Q1	2R	NH	2R	3R	1R	3R	3R	1R	0 / 7	8–7	53%
US Open	A	A	Q2	2R	2R	1R	2R	1R	2R	1R	1R	0 / 7	4–8	36%
Win–loss	0–0	0–0	0–0	3–4	1–3	3–4	8–4	0–4	7–4	5–4	1–4	0 / 30	28–31	48%
National representation
Davis Cup	Alt	A	A	A	SF (Note: Edition is split into the two years due to COVID-19.)		GS	SF	GS			0 / 4	5–4	56%
Summer Olympics	A	Not held				2R	Not held		A	NH		0 / 1	1–1	50%
Win–loss	0–0	0–0	0–0	0–0	0–0	1–2	1–2	3–0	0–0	0–0	0–0	0 / 4	5–4	56%
ATP 1000 tournaments
Indian Wells Open	A	A	A	QF	NH	1R	QF	2R	1R	1R	2R	0 / 7	8–7	53%
Miami Open	A	Q2	1R	2R	NH	2R	QF	3R	1R	2R	1R	0 / 8	8–8	50%
Monte-Carlo Masters	A	A	A	Q1	NH	1R	A	1R	2R	1R	1R	0 / 5	1–5	17%
Madrid Open	A	A	A	A	NH	1R	2R	2R	2R	1R	1R	0 / 6	2–6	25%
Italian Open	A	A	A	Q2	1R	1R	1R	1R	3R	1R	2R	0 / 7	3–7	30%
Canadian Open	A	A	A	A	NH	1R	1R	2R	1R	2R	2R	0 / 6	2–6	25%
Cincinnati Open	A	A	A	3R	A	1R	2R	1R	1R	1R	2R	0 / 7	4–7	36%
Shanghai Masters	A	A	A	1R	Not Held			1R	1R	1R	2R	0 / 5	2–5	29%
Paris Masters	A	A	A	Q1	2R	1R	1R	1R	2R	2R	Q1	0 / 6	3–6	33%
Win–loss	0–0	0–0	0–1	6–4	1–2	1–8	10–7	2–9	4–5	3–9	5–8	0 / 57	34–57	36%
Career statistics
	2016	2017	2018	2019	2020	2021	2022	2023	2024	2025	2026	SR	W–L	Win%
Tournaments	0	0	2	21	13	25	24	30	29	15	17	Career total: 176		
Titles	0	0	0	0	1	0	0	0	0	1	0	Career total: 2		
Finals	0	0	0	1	1	0	0	2	0	1	0	Career total: 5		
Overall win–loss	0–0	0–0	0–2	24–22	17–12	14–26	38–26	27–30	25–30	14–15	11–17	2 / 176	180–193	48%
Win %	–	–	0%	52%	59%	35%	59%	47%	45%	48%	39%	48%		
Year-end ranking (Note: 2015: ATP ranking–1350)	798	207	131	59	44	69	29	54	54	51		$9,349,764		

=== Doubles ===
Current through the 2026 Delray Beach Open.

Tournament	2019	2020	2021	2022	2023	2024	2025	2026	SR	W–L	Win%
Grand Slam tournaments
Australian Open	A	1R	2R	1R	A	1R	1R	A	0 / 5	1–5	17%
French Open	2R	1R	1R	2R	1R	1R	1R		0 / 7	2–7	22%
Wimbledon	A	NH	A	A	A	A	A		0 / 0	0–0	0%
US Open	3R	A	1R	1R	2R	1R	1R		0 / 6	3–6	33%
Win–loss	3–2	0–2	1–3	1–3	1–2	0–3	0–3		0 / 18	6–18	25%
ATP 1000 tournaments
Miami Open	1R	NH	QF	A	2R	A	A	A	0 / 3	3–3	50%
Canadian Open	A	NH	1R	A	A	2R	A		0 / 2	1–2	33%
Paris Masters	A	A	A	A	2R	A	A		0 / 1	1–0	100%
Win–loss	0–1	0–0	2–2	0–0	2–1	1–1	0–0		0 / 6	5–5	50%
Career statistics
	2019	2020	2021	2022	2023	2024	2025	2026	SR	W–L	Win%
Tournaments	6	5	9	8	9	6	5	2	Career total: 50		
Titles	0	0	0	1	0	0	1	0	Career total: 2		
Finals	0	0	0	1	1	0	1	0	Career total: 3		
Overall win–loss	3–6	0–5	4–8	7–7	11–9	1–7	5–5	1–1	2 / 50	32–48	40%
Win %	33%	0%	33%	50%	55%	13%	50%	50%	40%		
Year-end ranking (Note: 2016: ATP ranking–996) (Note: 2017: ATP ranking–742) (Note: 2018: ATP ranking–344)	189	250	276	187	161	–	234				

== ATP Tour finals ==
=== Singles: 5 (2 titles, 3 runner-ups) ===
Legend Grand Slam (0–0) ATP 1000 (0–0) ATP 500 (0–0) ATP 250 (2–3)	Finals by surface Hard (1–1) Clay (1–1) Grass (0–1)	Finals by setting Outdoor (2–3) Indoor (0–0)

Result	W–L	Date	Tournament	Tier	Surface	Opponent	Score
Loss	0–1	Jun 2019	Antalya Open, Turkey	ATP 250	Grass	(Italy) Lorenzo Sonego	7–6^{(7–5)}, 6–7^{(5–7)}, 1–6
Win	1–1	Sep 2020	Austrian Open Kitzbühel, Austria	ATP 250	Clay	(Germany) Yannick Hanfmann	6–4, 6–4
Loss	1–2	Feb 2023	Delray Beach Open, United States	ATP 250	Hard	(United States) Taylor Fritz	0–6, 7–5, 2–6
Loss	1–3	Apr 2023	Estoril Open, Portugal	ATP 250	Clay	(Norway) Casper Ruud	2–6, 6–7^{(3–7)}
Win	2–3	Feb 2025	Delray Beach Open, United States	ATP 250	Hard	(Spain) Alejandro Davidovich Fokina	3–6, 6–1, 7–5

=== Doubles: 3 (2 titles, 1 runner-up) ===
Legend Grand Slam (0–0) ATP 1000 (0–0) ATP 500 (0–0) ATP 250 (2–1)	Finals by surface Hard (2–0) Clay (0–1) Grass (0–0)	Finals by setting Outdoor (2–1) Indoor (0–0)

Result	W–L	Date	Tournament	Tier	Surface	Partner	Opponents	Score
Win	1–0	Aug 2022	Los Cabos Open, Mexico	ATP 250	Hard	(United States) William Blumberg	(South Africa) Raven Klaasen (Brazil) Marcelo Melo	6–0, 6–1
Loss	1–1	Apr 2023	Estoril Open, Portugal	ATP 250	Clay	(Serbia) Nikola Ćaćić	(Belgium) Sander Gillé (Belgium) Joran Vliegen	3–6, 4–6
Win	2–1	Feb 2025	Delray Beach Open, United States	ATP 250	Hard	(United States) Brandon Nakashima	(United States) Christian Harrison (United States) Evan King	7–6^{(7–3)}, 1–6, [10–3]

== Team Tennis Leagues ==
=== League finals: 2 (2 championships) ===
Finals by leagues World TeamTennis (WTT) (2–0)	Finals by club teams Springfield Lasers (2–0)	League table results 1st place (0) 2nd place (2)	Awards Finals MVP: 1 (2018 WTT)

Place	Date	League	Location(s)	Surface(s)	Team	Teammates	Opponent teams
Champions (2nd)	Jul-Aug 2018	WTT	U.S.	Hard, Hard (i)	(United States) Springfield Lasers	(South Africa) John-Laffnie de Jager (HC) (United States) Jack Sock (F) (United States) Vania King (R) (Canada) Daniel Nestor (R) (United States) Abigail Spears (R)	(United States); Philadelphia Freedoms: Runners-up (1st); Washington Kastles: 3rd San Diego Aviators: 4th Orange County Breakers: 5th New York Empire: 6th
Champions (2nd)	Jul-Aug 2019	WTT	U.S.	Hard, Hard (i)	(United States) Springfield Lasers	(South Africa) John-Laffnie de Jager (HC) (Spain) Enrique López Pérez (R) (Russia) Anna Blinkova (R) (Netherlands) Jean-Julien Rojer (R) (United States) Abigail Spears (R) (Belarus) Olga Govortsova (S) (Sweden) Robert Lindstedt (S) (United States) Evan Song (S)	(United States); New York Empire: Runners-up (4th); Philadelphia Freedoms: Semifinals (1st); San Diego Aviators: Semifinals (3rd); Vegas Rollers: 5th Orange County Breakers: 6th Orlando Storm: 7th Washington Kastles: 8th

*(HC): Head Coach, (F): Franchise Player, (W): Wildcard Player, (R): Roster Player, (S): Substitute Player

== ATP Challenger Tour finals ==
=== Singles: 4 (3 titles, 1 runner-up) ===
Legend ATP Challenger Tour (3–1)

Result	W–L	Date	Tournament	Tier	Surface	Opponent	Score
Win	1–0	Oct 2017	International Suzhou, China	Challenger	Hard	(Moldova) Radu Albot	6–4, 6–4
Loss	1–1	Oct 2018	Liuzhou Challenger, China	Challenger	Hard	(Moldova) Radu Albot	2–6, 6–4, 3–6
Win	2–1	Nov 2018	Shenzhen Longhua Open, China	Challenger	Hard	(Slovenia) Blaž Kavčič	6–2, 2–6, 6–3
Win	3–1	May 2026	Copa Faulconbridge, Spain	Challenger	Clay	(Paraguay) Daniel Vallejo	6–2, 3–6, 6–2

== ITF Futures finals ==
=== Singles: 5 (3 titles, 2 runner-ups) ===
Legend ITF Futures (3–2)	Finals by surface Hard (0–0) Clay (3–2)

Result	W–L	Date	Tournament	Tier	Surface	Opponent	Score
Loss	0–1	Apr 2016	US F14, Orange Park	Futures	Clay	(Canada) Denis Shapovalov	5–7, 6–2, 6–7^{(6–8)}
Win	1–1	Jan 2017	US F4, Sunrise	Futures	Clay	(Sweden) Christian Lindell	6–2, 6–2
Win	2–1	May 2017	Turkey F20, Antalya	Futures	Clay	(Italy) Alessandro Petrone	6–0, 6–4
Loss	2–2	Jun 2017	Turkey F21, Antalya	Futures	Clay	(Belgium) Julien Cagnina	3–6, 4–6
Win	3–2	Jun 2017	Belgium F1, Havré	Futures	Clay	(Belgium) Christopher Heyman	6–4, 3–6, 6–2

=== Doubles: 2 (1 title, 1 runner-up) ===
Legend ITF Futures (1–1)

Result	W–L	Date	Tournament	Tier	Surface	Partner	Opponents	Score
Win	1–0	May 2016	US F15, Vero Beach	Futures	Clay	(Germany) Jonas Luetjen	(United States) Reed Anderson (United States) Deiton Baughman	6–1, 5–7, [10–8]
Loss	1–1	May 2016	US F16, Tampa	Futures	Clay	(Germany) Jonas Luetjen	(Ecuador) Gonzalo Escobar (Ecuador) Roberto Quiroz	4–6, 6–7^{(4–6)}

== Junior Grand Slam finals ==
=== Singles: 1 (1 runner-up) ===
Result	Year	Tournament	Surface	Opponent	Score
Loss	2016	US Open	Hard	(Canada) Félix Auger-Aliassime	3–6, 0–6

== Wins against top 10 players ==
- Kecmanović has a 6–28 (17.65%) record against players who were, at the time the match was played, ranked in the top 10.

Season	2019	2020	2021	2022	2023	2024	2025	2026	Total
Wins	1	0	0	2	1	1	0	1	6

#	Player	Rk	Event	Surface	Rd	Score	Rk	Ref
2019
1.	(Germany) Alexander Zverev	6	Cincinnati Open, United States	Hard	2R	6–7^{(4–7)}, 6–2, 6–4	58	
2022
2.	(Italy) Matteo Berrettini	6	Indian Wells Open, United States	Hard	4R	6–3, 6–7^{(5–7)}, 6–4	61	
3.	(Canada) Félix Auger-Aliassime	9	Miami Open, United States	Hard	2R	6–4, 6–2	48	
2023
4.	(Denmark) Holger Rune	6	Stockholm Open, Sweden	Hard (i)	2R	7–6^{(7–3)}, 6–2	53	
2024
5.	(Norway) Casper Ruud	7	Italian Open, Italy	Clay	2R	0–6, 6–4, 6–4	58	
2026
6.	(Germany) Alexander Zverev	4	Mexican Open, Mexico	Hard	2R	6–3, 6–7^{(3–7)}, 7–6^{(7–4)}	84	

== See also ==
- Serbia Davis Cup team
- List of Serbia Davis Cup team representatives
- Sport in Serbia
- Junior tennis

== Notes ==
Awards and achievements
Preceded by (United States) Taylor Fritz	ITF Junior World Champion; 2016	Succeeded by (Argentina) Axel Geller
