= Gao Xin (tennis) =

Chinese tennis player

- Full name: Gao Xin
- Country (sports): China
- Born: 12 May 1994 (age 31) Tianjin, China
- Height: 5 ft 11 in (180 cm)
- Retired: 2023 (last match played)
- Plays: Right-handed (two-handed backhand)
- Prize money: $151,408

Singles
- Career record: 0–1 (at ATP Tour level, Grand Slam level, and in Davis Cup)
- Career titles: 0
- Highest ranking: No. 434 (7 November 2016)

Doubles
- Career record: 1–4 (at ATP Tour level, Grand Slam level, and in Davis Cup)
- Career titles: 0
- Highest ranking: No. 203 (2 April 2018)
- Last updated on: 30 September 2023.

Gao Xin (Chinese: 高鑫; pinyin: Gāo Xīn; Mandarin pronunciation: [káʊ ɕín]; born 12 May 1994, in Tianjin) is a Chinese former tennis player. Gao reached a career-high singles ranking of world No. 434 on 7 November 2016, and a career-high doubles ranking of No. 203 on 2 April 2018. He reached one singles final on the ITF circuit and 45 doubles finals posting a record of 24 wins and 21 losses, including a 3–2 record in ATP Challenger Tour finals.

== Career ==
Gao was a wildcard and lost in the first round of the 2014 ATP Shenzhen Open.

In 2018, Gao played in his first ATP doubles match, when he received a wildcard entry into the main doubles draw of the 2018 Chengdu Open along with partner Te Rigele. They were defeated in the first round by Matthew Ebden and Mischa Zverev 2–6, 2–6.

The following year at the 2019 Chengdu Open he again received a wildcard entry but would capitalize on the opportunity this time, as he won his first ATP Tour match when he and partner Zhe Li defeated Denis Shapovalov and Jordan Thompson in the first round 7–5, 2–6, [10–1]. They were defeated in the quarterfinals (which was the second round) by Nikola Cacic and Dušan Lajović.

== ATP Challenger and ITF Futures finals ==
=== Singles: 1 (0–1) ===
Legend ATP Challenger (0–0) ITF Futures (0–1)	Finals by surface Hard (0–1) Clay (0–0) Grass (0–0) Carpet (0–0)

Result	W–L	Date	Tournament	Tier	Surface	Opponent	Score
Loss	0–1	Dec 2018	Hong Kong F3	Futures	Hard	(Kazakhstan) Denis Yevseyev	4–6, 6–1, 4–6

=== Doubles: 45 (24–21) ===
Legend ATP Challenger (3–2) ITF Futures (21–19)	Finals by surface Hard (22–19) Clay (2–2) Grass (0–0) Carpet (0–0)

Result	W–L	Date	Tournament	Tier	Surface	Partner	Opponents	Score
Loss	0–1	Feb 2012	China F4, Yuxi	Futures	Hard	(China) Yu Chang	(China) Feng Xue (China) He Feng	6–2, 3–6, [5–10]
Loss	0–2	Mar 2012	Japan F2, Tokyo	Futures	Hard	(China) Yu Chang	(Japan) Takuto Niki (Japan) Arata Onozawa	6–3, 1–6, [6–10]
Loss	0–3	Apr 2012	Japan F3, Kofu	Futures	Hard	(China) Yu Chang	(Japan) Bumpei Sato (Chinese Taipei) Peng Hsien-yin	3–6, 7–5, [6–10]
Win	1–3	Apr 2012	China F6, Chengdu	Futures	Hard	(China) Zhe Li	(China) Yu Chang (China) Di Wu	2–2 ret.
Win	2–3	May 2012	China F8, Fuzhou	Futures	Hard	(China) Zhe Li	(Japan) Takuto Niki (Japan) Arata Onozawa	6–2, 6–3
Win	3–3	Jul 2012	China F10, Shenyang	Futures	Hard	(China) Zhe Li	(Chinese Taipei) Yi Chu-Huan (Chinese Taipei) Huang Liang-chi	6–4, 7–5
Loss	3–4	Feb 2013	Turkey F4, Antalya	Futures	Hard	(China) Yu Chang	(Ukraine) Artem Smirnov (Ukraine) Volodymyr Uzhylovskyi	2–6, 4–6
Win	4–4	May 2013	China F4, Fuzhou	Futures	Hard	(China) Zhe Li	(China) Gao Peng (China) Gao Wan	6–4, 2–6, [12–10]
Loss	4–5	Nov 2014	Cambodia F2, Phnom Penh	Futures	Hard	(China) Bowen Ouyang	(Germany) Robin Kern (Germany) Sebastian Wagner	6–3, 3–6, [5–10]
Win	5–5	Mar 2015	Japan F3, Kofu	Futures	Hard	(China) Zhe Li	(Japan) Takashi Saito (Japan) Yusuke Watanuki	6–0, 6–7^{(4-7)}, [10–1]
Win	6–5	Apr 2015	China F2, Anning	Futures	Clay	(China) Bowen Ouyang	(Chinese Taipei) Huang Liang-chi (Spain) Enrique López Pérez	7–6^{(7-3)}, 6–4
Win	7–5	Apr 2015	China F4, Yuxi	Futures	Hard	(China) Zhe Li	(South Korea) Kim Cheong-eui (Netherlands) Boy Westerhof	6–4, 6–4
Win	8–5	May 2015	China F6, Wuhan	Futures	Hard	(China) Zhe Li	(Japan) Arata Onozawa (China) Yan Bai	7–5, 6–3
Loss	8–6	Jun 2015	China F7, Wuhan	Futures	Hard	(Belgium) Michael Geerts	(Chinese Taipei) Yi Li-Feng (China) Yan Bai	3–6, 6–2, [15–17]
Win	9–6	Sep 2015	India F13, Coimbatore	Futures	Hard	(China) Bowen Ouyang	(India) Mohit Mayur Jayaprakash (India) N. Vijay Sundar Prashanth	2–6, 6–3, [10–5]
Win	10–6	Sep 2015	India F14, Chennai	Futures	Hard	(China) Bowen Ouyang	(India) Kunal Anand (Russia) Markos Kalovelonis	6–3, 5–7, [11–9]
Win	11–6	Oct 2015	Australia F6, Alice Springs	Futures	Hard	(China) Zhe Li	(Australia) Alex Bolt (Australia) Jordan Thompson	2–6, 6–3, [10–1]
Win	12–6	Oct 2015	Australia F7, Cairns	Futures	Hard	(China) Li Zhe	(New Zealand) Finn Tearney (Japan) Yusuke Watanuki	6–1, 6-2
Win	13–6	Feb 2016	China F1, Anning	Futures	Clay	(China) Ouyang Bowen	(Colombia) Cristian Rodríguez (France) Tak Khunn Wang	7–5, 6-3
Win	14–6	May 2016	China F8, Luan	Futures	Hard	(China) Bowen Ouyang	(Chinese Taipei) Peng Hsien-yin (China) Chuhan Wang	7–5, 6-3
Loss	14–7	Jul 2016	France F14, Saint-Gervais	Futures	Clay	(China) Ouyang Bowen	(France) Louis Tessa (France) Antoine Hoang	6–3, 4–6, [6–10]
Loss	14–8	Aug 2016	Chengdu, China	Challenger	Hard	(China) Zhe Li	(China) Mao-Xin Gong (China) Zhang Ze	3–6, 6–4, [11–13]
Loss	14–9	Aug 2016	Thailand F1, Hua Hin	Futures	Hard	(South Korea) Yunseong Chung	(Chinese Taipei) Chen Ti (United States) John Paul Fruttero	2–6, 2-6
Loss	14–10	Sep 2016	Shanghai, China	Challenger	Hard	(China) Zhe Li	(Chinese Taipei) Hsieh Cheng-peng (Chinese Taipei) Yi Chu-Huan	6–7^{(6-8)}, 7–5, [0–10]
Loss	14–11	Sep 2016	Vietnam F5, Thủ Dầu Một	Futures	Hard	(Japan) Shintaro Imai	(Vietnam) Lý Hoàng Nam (Vietnam) Nguyễn Hoàng Thiên	6–7^{(4-7)}, 6–7^{(4-7)}
Win	15–11	Apr 2017	China F4, Luzhou	Futures	Hard	(China) Zhe Li	(Chinese Taipei) Peng Hsien-yin (Chinese Taipei) Jimmy Wang	4–6, 6–3, [10–6]
Loss	15–12	May 2017	China F7, Wuhan	Futures	Hard	(China) Zhe Li	(Japan) Kaichi Uchida (Japan) Shintaro Imai	6–4, 4–6, [8–10]
Win	16–12	Jul 2017	China F10, Kunshan	Futures	Hard	(China) Zhe Li	(China) He Yecong (China) Zhang Zhizhen	6–3, 6-2
Win	17–12	Jul 2017	China F11, Shenzhen	Futures	Hard	(China) Zhe Li	(China) Wu Hao (China) Xia Zihao	7–6^{(7-4)}, 6-2
Win	18–12	Sep 2017	Zhangjiagang, China	Challenger	Hard	(China) Zhang Zhizhen	(Chinese Taipei) Chen Ti (Chinese Taipei) Yi Chu-Huan	6–2, 6-3
Win	19–12	Oct 2017	Suzhou, China	Challenger	Hard	(China) Sun Fajing	(China) Mao-Xin Gong (China) Zhang Ze	7–6^{(7–5)}, 4–6, [10–7]
Loss	19–13	Dec 2017	Thailand F12, Hua Hin	Futures	Hard	(China) Sun Fajing	(South Korea) Chung Hong (South Korea) Song Min-kyu	6–7^{(5-7)}, 6–3, [6–10]
Loss	19–14	May 2018	China F6, Luan	Futures	Hard	(China) Te Rigele	(Finland) Harri Heliövaara (Finland) Patrik Niklas-Salminen	2–6, 3-6
Loss	19–15	Jul 2018	China F9, Shenzhen	Futures	Hard	(China) Wang Aoran	(South Korea) Song Min-kyu (South Korea) Nam Ji-sung	6–3, 4–6, [4–10]
Loss	19–16	Dec 2018	Hong Kong F3	Futures	Hard	(China) Wang Aoran	(Chinese Taipei) Hsu Yu Hsiou (Japan) Shintaro Imai	6–7^{(1-7)}, 1-6
Loss	19–17	Jun 2019	M25 Luzhou, China	World Tennis Tour	Hard	(China) Sun Fajing	(Chinese Taipei) Wu Hao (China) Wang Aoran	6–2, 1–6, [5–10]
Loss	19–18	Jun 2019	M25 Hong Kong	World Tennis Tour	Hard	(Hong Kong) Yeung Pak-long	(Thailand) Sonchat Ratiwatana (Thailand) Sanchai Ratiwatana	3–6, 6–4, [8–10]
Win	20–18	Jul 2019	M25 Kunshan, China	World Tennis Tour	Hard	(China) Sun Fajing	(China) Hua Runhao (China) Zeng Shi Hong	6-2, 7–6^{(7-5)}
Loss	20–19	Aug 2019	M15 Vigo, Spain	World Tennis Tour	Clay	(China) Wang Aoran	(Brazil) Rafael Matos (Brazil) Oscar Jose Gutierrez	5–7, 2–6
Win	21–19	Sep 2019	Shanghai, China	Challenger	Hard	(China) Sun Fajing	(Australia) Scott Puodziunas (Australia) Marc Polmans	2–6, 6–4, [10–7]
Loss	21–20	May 2022	M15 Monastir, Tunisia	World Tennis Tour	Hard	(China) Li Zhe	(Tunisia) Skander Mansouri (Australia) Akira Santillan	3–6, 0–6
Win	22–20	Mar 2023	M15 Monastir, Tunisia	World Tennis Tour	Hard	(China) Wang Aoran	(Greece) Stefanos Sakellaridis (Greece) Dimitris Sakellaridis	6–2, 6–4
Win	23–20	Mar 2023	M15 Monastir, Tunisia	World Tennis Tour	Hard	(China) Dong Bohua	(Tunisia) Wissam Abderrahman (Portugal) Tiago Pereira	7–6 ^{(7–5)}, 3–6, [10–5]
Win	24–20	Jul 2023	M15 Tianjin, China	World Tennis Tour	Hard	(Chinese Taipei) Ray Ho	(China) Li Hanwen (China) Sun Qian	3–6, 6–4, [10–8]
Loss	24–21	Jul 2023	M25 Fuzhou, China	World Tennis Tour	Hard	(China) Dong Bohua	(China) Cui Jie (China) Wang Xiaofei	4–6, 4–6
