= 2024 International Challenger Zhangjiagang – Singles =

Singles
- 2024 International Challenger Zhangjiagang

Final
- Champion: (Japan) Yasutaka Uchiyama
- Runner-up: (Estonia) Mark Lajal
- Score: 6–7^{(4–7)}, 6–2, 6–2

Events
Singles	Doubles
- International Challenger Zhangjiagang

Térence Atmane was the defending champion but chose not to defend his title.

Yasutaka Uchiyama won the title after defeating Mark Lajal 6–7^{(4–7)}, 6–2, 6–2 in the final.

== Seeds ==
1. (Hong Kong) Coleman Wong (second round)
2. (South Korea) Hong Seong-chan (semifinals, retired)
3. (Chinese Taipei) Hsu Yu-hsiou (first round)
4. (Japan) Yasutaka Uchiyama (champion)
5. (Australia) Marc Polmans (first round)
6. (Kazakhstan) Beibit Zhukayev (second round)
7. (Estonia) Mark Lajal (final)
8. Egor Gerasimov (first round)

== Draw ==
Key

- Q = Qualifier
- WC = Wild card
- LL = Lucky loser
- Alt = Alternate
- ITF = ITF entry
- PR = Protected ranking
- SR = Special ranking
- SE = Special exempt
- JE = Junior exempt
- JR = Junior Accelerator Programme entrant
- CO = College Accelerator Programme entrant
- NG = Next Gen Accelerator Program entrant
- w/o = Walkover
- r = Retired
- d = Defaulted

=== Finals ===
Semifinals
Q	(Slovakia) Norbert Gombos	3	4
7	(Estonia) Mark Lajal	6	6
4	(Japan) Yasutaka Uchiyama	6	6^{6}	4
2	(South Korea) Hong Seong-chan	3	7^{8}	0^{r}

Final
7	(Estonia) Mark Lajal	7^{7}	2	2
4	(Japan) Yasutaka Uchiyama	6^{4}	6	6

=== Top half ===
First round
1	(Hong Kong) C Wong	6	5	6
Q	E Agafonov	3	7	4
Q	(Slovakia) N Gombos	7	5	6
WC	(China) Y Wu	5	7	1
(France) T Lamasine	2	6^{2}
(Czech Republic) D Svrčina	6	7^{7}
Q	(Japan) Y Takahashi	7	6
5	(Australia) M Polmans	5	3
3	(Chinese Taipei) Y-h Hsu	4	4
(China) J Cui	6	6
(Japan) R Noguchi	6	6
Mikalai Haliak	3	3
Q	(South Africa) Kris van Wyk	4	4
(United Kingdom) R Peniston	6	6
Alt	(South Africa) P Henning	6	5	6^{5}
7	(Estonia) M Lajal	4	7	7^{7}

Second round
1	(Hong Kong) C Wong	2	6^{3}
Q	(Slovakia) N Gombos	6	7^{7}
(Czech Republic) D Svrčina	6	6
Q	(Japan) Y Takahashi	2	1
(China) J Cui	6	3	1
(Japan) R Noguchi	0	6	6
(United Kingdom) R Peniston	2	2
7	(Estonia) M Lajal	6	6

Quarterfinals
Q	(Slovakia) N Gombos	w/o
(Czech Republic) D Svrčina
(Japan) R Noguchi	4	2
7	(Estonia) M Lajal	6	6

Semifinals
Q	(Slovakia) N Gombos	3	4
7	(Estonia) M Lajal	6	6

=== Bottom half ===
First round
6	(Kazakhstan) B Zhukayev	7	7
Q	(Slovakia) L Pokorný	5	5
WC	(China) Y Zhou	2	1
(Chinese Taipei) T-l Wu	6	6
(Ukraine) Vadym Ursu	6	7
Q	(New Zealand) A Rai	2	5
(Japan) Y Shimizu	2	0^{r}
4	(Japan) Y Uchiyama	6	1
8	E Gerasimov	6^{5}	3
WC	(China) S Tang	7^{7}	6
(Japan) K Uchida	3	7^{7}	0
(China) F Sun	6	6^{5}	6
(China) Y Bai	6	1	6
(Australia) B Mott	4	6	3
LL	E Donskoy	6	6^{1}	2
2	(South Korea) S-c Hong	4	7^{7}	6

Second round
6	(Kazakhstan) B Zhukayev	7	2	5
(Chinese Taipei) T-l Wu	5	6	7
(Ukraine) V Ursu	2	1
4	(Japan) Y Uchiyama	6	6
WC	(China) S Tang	4	4
(China) F Sun	6	6
(China) Y Bai	2	1
2	(South Korea) S-c Hong	6	6

Quarterfinals
(Chinese Taipei) T-l Wu	7^{7}	3	4
4	(Japan) Y Uchiyama	6^{5}	6	6
(China) F Sun	7	2	2
2	(South Korea) S-c Hong	5	6	6

Semifinals
4	(Japan) Y Uchiyama	6	6^{6}	4
2	(South Korea) S-c Hong	3	7^{8}	0^{r}
