= 2025 International Challenger Zhangjiagang – Singles =

Singles
- 2025 International Challenger Zhangjiagang

Final
- Champion: (Japan) Sho Shimabukuro
- Runner-up: (United Kingdom) Oliver Crawford
- Score: 6–3, 3–6, 7–5

Events
Singles	Doubles
← 2024 ·	International Challenger Zhangjiagang	· 2026 →

Yasutaka Uchiyama was the defending champion but lost in the semifinals to Sho Shimabukuro.

Shimabukuro won the title after defeating Oliver Crawford 6–3, 3–6, 7–5 in the final.

== Seeds ==
1. (Australia) Bernard Tomic (first round)
2. (Japan) Rio Noguchi (second round)
3. (Japan) Sho Shimabukuro (champion)
4. (China) Sun Fajing (second round)
5. (Japan) Yasutaka Uchiyama (semifinals)
6. (United Kingdom) Oliver Crawford (final)
7. Ilia Simakin (quarterfinals)
8. (France) Arthur Géa (first round)

== Draw ==
Key

- Q = Qualifier
- WC = Wild card
- LL = Lucky loser
- Alt = Alternate
- ITF = ITF entry
- PR = Protected ranking
- SR = Special ranking
- SE = Special exempt
- JE = Junior exempt
- JR = Junior Accelerator Programme entrant
- CO = College Accelerator Programme entrant
- NG = Next Gen Accelerator Program entrant
- w/o = Walkover
- r = Retired
- d = Defaulted

=== Finals ===
Semifinals
6	(United Kingdom) Oliver Crawford	7^{7}	6
(Japan) Kokoro Isomura	6^{1}	0
3	(Japan) Sho Shimabukuro	6	7^{7}
5	(Japan) Yasutaka Uchiyama	3	6^{5}

Final
6	(United Kingdom) Oliver Crawford	3	6	5
3	(Japan) Sho Shimabukuro	6	3	7

=== Top half ===
First round
1	(Australia) B Tomic	1	6	6^{6}
PR	(Australia) P Sekulic	6	1	7^{8}
(Italy) A Binda	7	3	3
Alt	(Japan) Renta Tokuda	5	6	6
(Kazakhstan) D Yevseyev	2	6	4
(Japan) H Moriya	6	4	6
(Japan) M Imamura	3	2
6	(United Kingdom) O Crawford	6	6
4	(China) F Sun	3	6	6
WC	(China) Y Mo	6	3	4
(South Korea) Shin San-hui	7	7^{7}
(South Korea) Shin Woo-bin	5	6^{4}
Alt	(Uzbekistan) S Fomin	3	2
(Japan) K Isomura	6	6
(China) J Cui	5	7^{7}	6
8	(France) A Géa	7	6^{4}	0

Second round
PR	(Australia) P Sekulic	4	4
Alt	(Japan) R Tokuda	6	6
(Japan) H Moriya	3	6	4
6	(United Kingdom) O Crawford	6	4	6
4	(China) F Sun	3	1
(South Korea) S-h Shin	6	6
(Japan) K Isomura	3	6	7^{11}
(China) J Cui	6	2	6^{9}

Quarterfinals
Alt	(Japan) R Tokuda	6^{1}	6	2
6	(United Kingdom) O Crawford	7^{7}	3	6
(South Korea) S-h Shin	6	2	4
(Japan) K Isomura	2	6	6

Semifinals
6	(United Kingdom) O Crawford	7^{7}	6
(Japan) K Isomura	6^{1}	0

=== Bottom half ===
First round
7	I Simakin	6	7^{7}
(Chinese Taipei) T-l Wu	4	6^{1}
Q	(Australia) J Charlton	6	6^{7}	6
WC	(China) R Te	4	7^{9}	4
Q	(Poland) F Peliwo	6	6
P Bar Biryukov	1	2
LL	(New Zealand) J Watt	4	6	2
3	(Japan) S Shimabukuro	6	3	6
5	(Japan) Y Uchiyama	6	5	6
Q	(Japan) Yuta Kikuchi	2	7	1
Q	(Japan) K Uesugi	1	7^{7}	2^{r}
Q	(Chinese Taipei) T-h Huang	6	6^{4}	3
Alt	(Switzerland) L Castelnuovo	6^{4}	3
Q	(Japan) K Uchida	7^{7}	6
WC	(China) Xiao Linang	6^{6}	1
2	(Japan) R Noguchi	7^{8}	6

Second round
7	I Simakin	6	6
Q	(Australia) J Charlton	4	4
Q	(Poland) F Peliwo	3	4
3	(Japan) S Shimabukuro	6	6
5	(Japan) Y Uchiyama	6	6
Q	(Chinese Taipei) T-h Huang	2	4
Q	(Japan) K Uchida	6	7^{7}
2	(Japan) R Noguchi	1	6^{4}

Quarterfinals
7	I Simakin	4	3
3	(Japan) S Shimabukuro	6	6
5	(Japan) Y Uchiyama	6	6
Q	(Japan) K Uchida	3	4

Semifinals
3	(Japan) S Shimabukuro	6	7^{7}
5	(Japan) Y Uchiyama	3	6^{5}
