= 2023 International Challenger Zhangjiagang – Singles =

Singles
- 2023 International Challenger Zhangjiagang

Final
- Champion: (France) Térence Atmane
- Runner-up: Mikalai Haliak
- Score: 6–1, 6–2

Events
Singles	Doubles
- International Challenger Zhangjiagang

Marc Polmans was the defending champion but chose not to defend his title.

Térence Atmane won the title after defeating Mikalai Haliak 6–1, 6–2 in the final.

== Seeds ==
1. (China) Bu Yunchaokete (first round)
2. (France) Térence Atmane (champion)
3. (Japan) Kaichi Uchida (first round)
4. (Japan) Rio Noguchi (first round)
5. (Australia) Li Tu (quarterfinals)
6. (Chinese Taipei) Jason Jung (withdrew)
7. (Lithuania) Ričardas Berankis (semifinals)
8. (Australia) James McCabe (semifinals, retired)

== Draw ==
Key

- Q = Qualifier
- WC = Wild card
- LL = Lucky loser
- Alt = Alternate
- ITF = ITF entry
- PR = Protected ranking
- SR = Special ranking
- SE = Special exempt
- JE = Junior exempt
- JR = Junior Accelerator Programme entrant
- CO = College Accelerator Programme entrant
- NG = Next Gen Accelerator Program entrant
- w/o = Walkover
- r = Retired
- d = Defaulted

=== Finals ===
Semifinals
8	(Australia) James McCabe	2	2^{r}
Q	Mikalai Haliak	6	3
7	(Lithuania) Ričardas Berankis	1	6	3
2	(France) Térence Atmane	6	3	6

Final
Q	Mikalai Haliak	1	2
2	(France) Térence Atmane	6	6

=== Top half ===
First round
1	(China) Y Bu	7^{9}	3	6^{6}
WC	(China) R Te	6^{7}	6	7^{8}
(Poland) F Peliwo	6	3	6
(Czech Republic) D Palán	2	6	2
Q	(Bulgaria) Leonid Sheyngezikht	4	1
(Italy) L Giustino	6	6
(Australia) L Saville	6^{3}	6	3
8	(Australia) J McCabe	7^{7}	2	6
4	(Japan) R Noguchi	3	6	2
Q	(China) Xiao Linang	6	4	6
Q	Mikalai Haliak	6	7
(India) M Sasikumar	3	5
(United States) E Zhu	5	6^{6}
(Greece) S Sakellaridis	7	7^{8}
Q	(China) J Cui	2	2
LL	(Japan) Y Takahashi	6	6

Second round
WC	(China) R Te	6	6
(Poland) F Peliwo	3	1
(Italy) L Giustino	4	6	1
8	(Australia) J McCabe	6	3	6
Q	(China) L Xiao	4	1
Q	M Haliak	6	6
(Greece) S Sakellaridis	3	1
LL	(Japan) Y Takahashi	6	6

Quarterfinals
WC	(China) R Te	6^{6}	6	0
8	(Australia) J McCabe	7^{8}	3	6
Q	M Haliak	6	6
LL	(Japan) Y Takahashi	4	4

Semifinals
8	(Australia) J McCabe	2	2^{r}
Q	M Haliak	6	3

=== Bottom half ===
First round
7	(Lithuania) R Berankis	6	7
(Japan) Y Uchiyama	4	5
Q	(China) Liu Hanyi	4	6	3
(Latvia) R Strombachs	6	3	6
(Vietnam) NH Lý	5	6	6
(United States) N Chappell	7	3	2
LL	(Northern Mariana Islands) C Sinclair	6	3	6
3	(Japan) K Uchida	3	6	4
5	(Australia) L Tu	6	6
(Australia) P Sekulic	3	4
Alt	(New Zealand) R Statham	6	3	7^{7}
WC	(China) H Li	3	6	6^{2}
(France) A Weber	2	2
Alt	(United States) A Ayeni	6	6
WC	(China) F Sun	6	6^{1}	6^{9}
2	(France) T Atmane	4	7^{7}	7^{11}

Second round
7	(Lithuania) R Berankis	6	6
(Latvia) R Strombachs	4	2
(Vietnam) NH Lý	3	6	1
LL	(Northern Mariana Islands) C Sinclair	6	1	6
5	(Australia) L Tu	6	6
Alt	(New Zealand) R Statham	2	2
Alt	(United States) A Ayeni	1	6	2
2	(France) T Atmane	6	3	6

Quarterfinals
7	(Lithuania) R Berankis	7	6^{4}	6
LL	(Northern Mariana Islands) C Sinclair	5	7^{7}	1
5	(Australia) L Tu	3	5
2	(France) T Atmane	6	7

Semifinals
7	(Lithuania) R Berankis	1	6	3
2	(France) T Atmane	6	3	6
