= 2018 International Challenger Zhangjiagang – Singles =

Singles
- 2018 International Challenger Zhangjiagang

Final
- Champion: (Japan) Yasutaka Uchiyama
- Runner-up: (Chinese Taipei) Jason Jung
- Score: 6–2, 6–2

Events
Singles	Doubles
- International Challenger Zhangjiagang

Jason Jung was the defending champion but lost in the final to Yasutaka Uchiyama.

Uchiyama won the title after defeating Jung 6–2, 6–2 in the final.

== Seeds ==
1. (Chinese Taipei) Jason Jung (final)
2. (Japan) Tatsuma Ito (second round)
3. (China) Zhang Ze (first round)
4. (Japan) Go Soeda (second round)
5. (Canada) Filip Peliwo (first round)
6. (Serbia) Miomir Kecmanović (semifinals)
7. (Japan) Hiroki Moriya (second round)
8. (Kazakhstan) Alexander Bublik (semifinals)

== Draw ==
Key

- Q = Qualifier
- WC = Wild card
- LL = Lucky loser
- Alt = Alternate
- ITF = ITF entry
- PR = Protected ranking
- SR = Special ranking
- SE = Special exempt
- JE = Junior exempt
- JR = Junior Accelerator Programme entrant
- CO = College Accelerator Programme entrant
- NG = Next Gen Accelerator Program entrant
- w/o = Walkover
- r = Retired
- d = Defaulted

=== Finals ===
Semifinals
1	(Chinese Taipei) Jason Jung	7^{7}	6^{5}	6
8	(Kazakhstan) Alexander Bublik	6^{3}	7^{7}	0
(Japan) Yasutaka Uchiyama	6	4	7
6	(Serbia) Miomir Kecmanović	3	6	5

Final
1	(Chinese Taipei) Jason Jung	2	2
(Japan) Yasutaka Uchiyama	6	6

=== Top half ===
First round
1	(Chinese Taipei) J Jung	6	6
Q	(Japan) Y Shimizu	4	3
(China) Z Li	0	6	3
WC	(China) Zh Zhang	6	1	6
(Chinese Taipei) T-h Yang	4	1^{r}
(Australia) A Santillan	6	3
WC	(China) R Te	6	6
5	(Canada) F Peliwo	4	4
4	(Japan) G Soeda	7	7
(Italy) A Bega	5	5
(South Korea) Y-s Chung	3	6	6
(Russia) R Safiullin	6	4	3
Q	(Australia) D Kelly	7^{7}	7
(South Korea) S-w Kwon	6^{5}	5
LL	(Japan) Y Takahashi	3	4
8	(Kazakhstan) A Bublik	6	6

Second round
1	(Chinese Taipei) J Jung	6	6
WC	(China) Zh Zhang	4	4
(Australia) A Santillan	7	6^{4}	6
WC	(China) R Te	5	7^{7}	4
4	(Japan) G Soeda	5	6	2
(South Korea) Y-s Chung	7	3	6
Q	(Australia) D Kelly	5	4
8	(Kazakhstan) A Bublik	7	6

Quarterfinals
1	(Chinese Taipei) J Jung	7	6
(Australia) A Santillan	5	2
(South Korea) Y-s Chung	4	4
8	(Kazakhstan) A Bublik	6	6

Semifinals
1	(Chinese Taipei) J Jung	7^{7}	6^{5}	6
8	(Kazakhstan) A Bublik	6^{3}	7^{7}	0

=== Bottom half ===
First round
7	(Japan) H Moriya	7^{8}	6
Q	(France) T Lamasine	6^{6}	2
(Japan) Y Uchiyama	6	4
(Slovenia) B Kavčič	3	2^{r}
(Belarus) U Ignatik	6	7^{7}
(Bosnia and Herzegovina) A Šetkić	2	6^{3}
(South Korea) D-h Lee	6	5	6
3	(China) Ze Zhang	3	7	0
6	(Serbia) M Kecmanović	6	3	6
(Australia) M Purcell	3	6	3
Q	(Portugal) F Ferreira Silva	4	4
(Austria) J Rodionov	6	6
WC	(China) Y Wu	6	6
WC	(China) Y He	3	4
(Canada) S Diez	4	1
2	(Japan) T Ito	6	6

Second round
7	(Japan) H Moriya	6	6^{5}	3
(Japan) Y Uchiyama	4	7^{7}	6
(Belarus) U Ignatik	7^{8}	6
(South Korea) D-h Lee	6^{6}	1
6	(Serbia) M Kecmanović	2	6	6
(Austria) J Rodionov	6	3	3
WC	(China) Y Wu	7^{8}	4	6
2	(Japan) T Ito	6^{6}	6	3

Quarterfinals
(Japan) Y Uchiyama	6	6
(Belarus) U Ignatik	4	3
6	(Serbia) M Kecmanović	6	6
WC	(China) Y Wu	4	4

Semifinals
(Japan) Y Uchiyama	6	4	7
6	(Serbia) M Kecmanović	3	6	5
