= 2023 International Challenger Zhangjiagang – Doubles =

Doubles
- 2023 International Challenger Zhangjiagang

Final
- Champions: (Chinese Taipei) Ray Ho (Australia) Matthew Romios
- Runners-up: (Philippines) Francis Alcantara (China) Sun Fajing
- Score: 6–3, 6–4

Events
Singles	Doubles
← 2019 ·	International Challenger Zhangjiagang	· 2024 →

Max Purcell and Luke Saville were the defending champions but only Saville chose to defend his title, partnering Li Tu. Saville lost in the quarterfinals to Toshihide Matsui and Kaito Uesugi.

Ray Ho and Matthew Romios won the title after defeating Francis Alcantara and Sun Fajing 6–3, 6–4 in the final.

== Seeds ==
1. (Japan) Toshihide Matsui / (Japan) Kaito Uesugi (semifinals)
2. (India) Rithvik Choudary Bollipalli / (India) Arjun Kadhe (first round)
3. (Northern Mariana Islands) Colin Sinclair / (New Zealand) Rubin Statham (first round)
4. (Chinese Taipei) Ray Ho / (Australia) Matthew Romios (champions)

== Draw ==
Key

- Q = Qualifier
- WC = Wild card
- LL = Lucky loser
- Alt = Alternate
- ITF = ITF entry
- PR = Protected ranking
- SR = Special ranking
- SE = Special exempt
- JE = Junior exempt
- JR = Junior Accelerator Programme entrant
- CO = College Accelerator Programme entrant
- NG = Next Gen Accelerator Program entrant
- w/o = Walkover
- r = Retired
- d = Defaulted

First round
1	(Japan) T Matsui (Japan) K Uesugi	7^{7}	6
Alt	Ivan Denisov (Bulgaria) Leonid Sheyngezikht	6^{5}	4
(Poland) F Peliwo (France) A Weber	3	1
(Australia) L Saville (Australia) L Tu	6	6
4	(Chinese Taipei) R Ho (Australia) MC Romios	6	6
(United States) N Chappell (Japan) R Noguchi	3	2
WC	(China) J Cui (China) Liu Hanyi	6	3	[4]
PR	(Greece) M Kalovelonis (Greece) S Sakellaridis	3	6	[10]
(China) Y Bu (China) R Te	6	6
(United States) A Ayeni (United States) E Zhu	3	4
(Japan) K Uchida (Japan) Y Uchiyama	7^{7}	4	[10]
3	(Northern Mariana Islands) C Sinclair (New Zealand) R Statham	6^{4}	6	[7]
(Italy) L Giustino (Latvia) R Strombachs	5	7^{8}	[9]
WC	(China) H Li (China) Wang Xiaofei	7	6^{6}	[11]
(Philippines) FC Alcantara (China) F Sun	6	6
2	(India) RC Bollipalli (India) A Kadhe	0	3

Quarterfinals
1	(Japan) T Matsui (Japan) K Uesugi	6	1	[10]
(Australia) L Saville (Australia) L Tu	4	6	[7]
4	(Chinese Taipei) R Ho (Australia) MC Romios	7	6
PR	(Greece) M Kalovelonis (Greece) S Sakellaridis	5	2
(China) Y Bu (China) R Te	5	6	[10]
(Japan) K Uchida (Japan) Y Uchiyama	7	1	[5]
WC	(China) H Li (China) X Wang	3	1
(Philippines) FC Alcantara (China) F Sun	6	6

Semifinals
1	(Japan) T Matsui (Japan) K Uesugi	4	7	[5]
4	(Chinese Taipei) R Ho (Australia) MC Romios	6	5	[10]
(China) Y Bu (China) R Te	6^{7}	3
(Philippines) FC Alcantara (China) F Sun	7^{9}	6

Final
4	(Chinese Taipei) R Ho (Australia) MC Romios	6	6
(Philippines) FC Alcantara (China) F Sun	3	4
