= 2018 International Challenger Zhangjiagang – Doubles =

Doubles
- 2018 International Challenger Zhangjiagang

Final
- Champions: (China) Gong Maoxin (China) Zhang Ze
- Runners-up: (Australia) Bradley Mousley (Australia) Akira Santillan
- Score: Walkover

Events
Singles	Doubles
← 2017 ·	International Challenger Zhangjiagang	· 2019 →

Gao Xin and Zhang Zhizhen were the defending champions but lost in the quarterfinals to Gong Maoxin and Zhang Ze.

Gong and Zhang Ze won the title after Bradley Mousley and Akira Santillan withdrew before the final.

== Seeds ==
1. (India) Sriram Balaji / (India) Vishnu Vardhan (first round)
2. (Thailand) Sanchai Ratiwatana / (Thailand) Sonchat Ratiwatana (first round)
3. (Australia) Max Purcell / (Japan) Yasutaka Uchiyama (first round)
4. (China) Gong Maoxin / (China) Zhang Ze (champions)

== Draw ==
=== Key ===
- Q = Qualifier
- WC = Wild card
- LL = Lucky loser
- Alt = Alternate
- SE = Special exempt
- PR = Protected ranking
- ITF = ITF entry
- JE = Junior exempt
- w/o = Walkover
- r = Retired
- d = Defaulted
- SR = Special ranking

First round
1	(India) S Balaji (India) V Vardhan	4	6	[8]
WC	(China) F Sun (China) Zeng Shi Hong	6	3	[10]
(United States) A Lawson (China) Z Li	7^{7}	4	[22]
(Chinese Taipei) T Chen (Chinese Taipei) C-h Yi	6^{2}	6	[24]
3	(Australia) M Purcell (Japan) Y Uchiyama	4	6^{4}
(Australia) B Mousley (Australia) A Santillan	6	7^{7}
(Chinese Taipei) C-p Hsieh (Bosnia and Herzegovina) A Šetkić	7	6
WC	(China) R Te (China) D Wu	5	4
WC	(China) X Gao (China) Zh Zhang	6	7^{7}
(India) A Kadhe (New Zealand) R Statham	4	6^{5}
(France) T Lamasine (Japan) H Moriya	3	1
4	(China) M Gong (China) Ze Zhang	6	6
(Kazakhstan) A Bublik (Serbia) M Kecmanović	6	6
(Belarus) U Ignatik (India) VS Prashanth	4	4
(Chinese Taipei) H-y Peng (Chinese Taipei) T-h Yang	7^{7}	7^{7}
2	(Thailand) Sa Ratiwatana (Thailand) So Ratiwatana	6^{1}	6^{5}

Quarterfinals
WC	(China) F Sun (China) SH Zeng	7	7
(Chinese Taipei) T Chen (Chinese Taipei) C-h Yi	5	5
(Australia) B Mousley (Australia) A Santillan	6	4	[11]
(Chinese Taipei) C-p Hsieh (Bosnia and Herzegovina) A Šetkić	0	6	[9]
WC	(China) X Gao (China) Zh Zhang	3	3
4	(China) M Gong (China) Ze Zhang	6	6
(Kazakhstan) A Bublik (Serbia) M Kecmanović	7^{7}	6
(Chinese Taipei) H-y Peng (Chinese Taipei) T-h Yang	6^{4}	3

Semifinals
WC	(China) F Sun (China) SH Zeng	3	1
(Australia) B Mousley (Australia) A Santillan	6	6
4	(China) M Gong (China) Ze Zhang	6	6
(Kazakhstan) A Bublik (Serbia) M Kecmanović	4	2

Final
(Australia) B Mousley (Australia) A Santillan
4	(China) M Gong (China) Ze Zhang	w/o
