= 2026 International Challenger Zhangjiagang – Singles =

Singles
- 2026 International Challenger Zhangjiagang

Final
- Champion: Ilia Simakin
- Runner-up: (Thailand) Kasidit Samrej
- Score: 6–3, 6–1

Events
Singles	Doubles
- International Challenger Zhangjiagang

Sho Shimabukuro was the defending champion but chose not to defend his title.

Ilia Simakin won the title after defeating Kasidit Samrej 6–3, 6–1 in the final.

== Seeds ==
1. (Australia) Bernard Tomic (second round)
2. (Sweden) Elias Ymer (first round, retired)
3. (Chinese Taipei) Tseng Chun-hsin (semifinals)
4. (China) Zhou Yi (first round)
5. (Japan) Hayato Matsuoka (first round)
6. Ilia Simakin (champion)
7. (Japan) Kaichi Uchida (first round)
8. Petr Bar Biryukov (first round)

== Draw ==
Key

- Q = Qualifier
- WC = Wild card
- LL = Lucky loser
- Alt = Alternate
- ITF = ITF entry
- PR = Protected ranking
- SR = Special ranking
- SE = Special exempt
- JE = Junior exempt
- JR = Junior Accelerator Programme entrant
- CO = College Accelerator Programme entrant
- NG = Next Gen Accelerator Program entrant
- w/o = Walkover
- r = Retired
- d = Defaulted

=== Finals ===
Semifinals
(Thailand) Kasidit Samrej	6	7^{7}
3	(Chinese Taipei) Tseng Chun-hsin	3	6^{1}
6	Ilia Simakin	6	6^{3}	6
Q	(Malaysia) Mitsuki Wei Kang Leong	3	7^{7}	3

Final
(Thailand) Kasidit Samrej	3	1
6	Ilia Simakin	6	6

=== Top half ===
First round
1	(Australia) B Tomic	6	3	6
(Japan) M Imamura	4	6	4
(Thailand) K Samrej	6	7^{7}
Q	(Japan) H Moriya	1	6^{2}
Q	(Uzbekistan) K Sultanov	7	6
(Uzbekistan) S Fomin	5	0
Q	(Australia) Enzo Aguiard	6	6
5	(Japan) H Matsuoka	3	4
3	(Chinese Taipei) C-h Tseng	6	6
WC	(China) Zhang Tianhui	4	0
(Japan) Y Watanuki	6	7
Semen Pankin	3	5
(China) F Sun	6^{2}	6	7^{7}
(Chinese Taipei) T-l Wu	7^{7}	4	6^{2}
WC	(China) Liu Hanyi	3	6	6
7	(Japan) K Uchida	6	3	2

Second round
1	(Australia) B Tomic	5	6^{3}
(Thailand) K Samrej	7	7^{7}
Q	(Uzbekistan) K Sultanov	6^{1}	4
Q	(Australia) E Aguiard	7^{7}	6
3	(Chinese Taipei) C-h Tseng	7	6
(Japan) Y Watanuki	5	3
(China) F Sun	6	7
WC	(China) H Liu	0	5

Quarterfinals
(Thailand) K Samrej	6	7^{7}
Q	(Australia) E Aguiard	4	6^{4}
3	(Chinese Taipei) C-h Tseng	6	6
(China) F Sun	3	3

Semifinals
(Thailand) K Samrej	6	7^{7}
3	(Chinese Taipei) C-h Tseng	3	6^{1}

=== Bottom half ===
First round
6	I Simakin	6	6
(Kazakhstan) D Yevseyev	1	2
(Switzerland) L Castelnuovo	6	3	1^{r}
(Australia) Matthew Dellavedova	4	6	4
Q	(Australia) O Jasika	2	3
(Japan) A Santillan	6	6
I Ivashka	3	7^{7}	6
4	(China) Y Zhou	6	6^{4}	3
8	P Bar Biryukov	6^{3}	3
Q	(Malaysia) Mitsuki Wei Kang Leong	7^{7}	6
Q	(Japan) Koki Matsuda	7^{7}	7^{8}
(Australia) Ja Delaney	6^{4}	6^{6}
WC	(China) J Cui	3	4
(Japan) J Trotter	6	6
(Chinese Taipei) Y-h Hsu	7^{7}	5
2	(Sweden) E Ymer	6^{4}	5^{r}

Second round
6	I Simakin	7	6
(Australia) M Dellavedova	5	2
(Japan) A Santillan	4	6	1
I Ivashka	6	4	6
Q	(Malaysia) MWK Leong	6	6
Q	(Japan) K Matsuda	3	2
(Japan) J Trotter	6	7
(Chinese Taipei) Y-h Hsu	4	5

Quarterfinals
6	I Simakin	7^{7}	6
I Ivashka	6^{5}	4
Q	(Malaysia) MWK Leong	6^{4}	6	4
(Japan) J Trotter	7^{7}	3	0^{r}

Semifinals
6	I Simakin	6	6^{3}	6
Q	(Malaysia) MWK Leong	3	7^{7}	3
