= 2025 International Challenger Zhangjiagang – Doubles =

Doubles
- 2025 International Challenger Zhangjiagang

Final
- Champions: (Switzerland) Luca Castelnuovo (Australia) Akira Santillan
- Runners-up: Petr Bar Biryukov (Italy) Alexandr Binda
- Score: 6–3, 6–7^{(8–10)}, [10–3]

Events
Singles	Doubles
- International Challenger Zhangjiagang

Kaichi Uchida and Takeru Yuzuki were the defending champions but chose to defend their title with different partners. Uchida partnered Yusuke Kusuhara but lost in the quarterfinals to Luca Castelnuovo and Akira Santillan. Yuzuki partnered Nam Ji-sung but lost in the semifinals to Castelnuovo and Santillan.

Castelnuovo and Santillan won the title after defeating Petr Bar Biryukov and Alexandr Binda 6–3, 6–7^{(8–10)}, [10–3] in the final.

== Seeds ==
1. (New Zealand) Finn Reynolds / (New Zealand) James Watt (quarterfinals)
2. (South Korea) Nam Ji-sung / (Japan) Takeru Yuzuki (semifinals)
3. (Thailand) Pruchya Isaro / (India) Niki Kaliyanda Poonacha (semifinals)
4. (Australia) Joshua Charlton / (United Kingdom) David Stevenson (first round)

== Draw ==
Key

- Q = Qualifier
- WC = Wild card
- LL = Lucky loser
- Alt = Alternate
- ITF = ITF entry
- PR = Protected ranking
- SR = Special ranking
- SE = Special exempt
- JE = Junior exempt
- JR = Junior Accelerator Programme entrant
- CO = College Accelerator Programme entrant
- NG = Next Gen Accelerator Program entrant
- w/o = Walkover
- r = Retired
- d = Defaulted

=== Draw ===
First round
1	(New Zealand) F Reynolds (New Zealand) J Watt	6^{4}	6	[10]
(India) R Ramanathan (China) F Sun	7^{7}	2	[8]
Alt	P Bar Biryukov (Italy) A Binda	3	6	[10]
(Japan) K Uesugi (Japan) S Watanabe	6	4	[5]
3	(Thailand) P Isaro (India) N Kaliyanda Poonacha	5	6	[10]
WC	(China) Sun Qian (China) S Tang	7	3	[8]
(Japan) M Imamura (Japan) R Noguchi	7	7^{7}
(Japan) S Nakagawa (Japan) N Tajima	5	6^{3}
Alt	(Switzerland) L Castelnuovo (Australia) A Santillan	6	7^{7}
I Simakin (Kazakhstan) D Yevseyev	3	6^{5}
(Japan) Y Kusuhara (Japan) K Uchida	7^{9}	2	[10]
4	(Australia) J Charlton (United Kingdom) D Stevenson	6^{7}	6	[7]
(China) J Cui (China) R Te	6	6
WC	(China) Charles Chen (China) Xiao Linang	3	4
(Japan) K Isomura (China) A Wang	5	1
2	(South Korea) J-s Nam (Japan) T Yuzuki	7	6

Quarterfinals
1	(New Zealand) F Reynolds (New Zealand) J Watt	6^{3}	3
Alt	P Bar Biryukov (Italy) A Binda	7^{7}	6
3	(Thailand) P Isaro (India) N Kaliyanda Poonacha	7	6^{7}	[10]
(Japan) M Imamura (Japan) R Noguchi	5	7^{9}	[5]
Alt	(Switzerland) L Castelnuovo (Australia) A Santillan	7^{7}	6
(Japan) Y Kusuhara (Japan) K Uchida	6^{5}	0
(China) J Cui (China) R Te	4	7	[7]
2	(South Korea) J-s Nam (Japan) T Yuzuki	6	5	[10]

Semifinals
Alt	P Bar Biryukov (Italy) A Binda	3	6	[10]
3	(Thailand) P Isaro (India) N Kaliyanda Poonacha	6	3	[4]
Alt	(Switzerland) L Castelnuovo (Australia) A Santillan	1	7	[12]
2	(South Korea) J-s Nam (Japan) T Yuzuki	6	5	[10]

Final
Alt	P Bar Biryukov (Italy) A Binda	3	7^{10}	[3]
Alt	(Switzerland) L Castelnuovo (Australia) A Santillan	6	6^{8}	[10]
