= 2017 International Challenger Zhangjiagang – Singles =

Singles
- 2017 International Challenger Zhangjiagang

Final
- Champion: (Chinese Taipei) Jason Jung
- Runner-up: (China) Zhang Ze
- Score: 6–4, 2–6, 6–4

Events
Singles	Doubles
- International Challenger Zhangjiagang

This was the first edition of the tournament.

Jason Jung won the title after defeating Zhang Ze 6–4, 2–6, 6–4 in the final.

== Seeds ==
1. (Switzerland) Henri Laaksonen (first round, retired)
2. (Japan) Go Soeda (semifinals)
3. (South Korea) Lee Duck-hee (first round)
4. (Japan) Yasutaka Uchiyama (quarterfinals)
5. (Japan) Hiroki Moriya (semifinals)
6. (Egypt) Mohamed Safwat (quarterfinals)
7. (China) Wu Di (quarterfinals)
8. (Chinese Taipei) Chen Ti (first round)

== Draw ==
Key

- Q = Qualifier
- WC = Wild card
- LL = Lucky loser
- Alt = Alternate
- ITF = ITF entry
- PR = Protected ranking
- SR = Special ranking
- SE = Special exempt
- JE = Junior exempt
- JR = Junior Accelerator Programme entrant
- CO = College Accelerator Programme entrant
- NG = Next Gen Accelerator Program entrant
- w/o = Walkover
- r = Retired
- d = Defaulted

=== Finals ===
Semifinals
(China) Zhang Ze	6	6
5	(Japan) Hiroki Moriya	3	1
(Chinese Taipei) Jason Jung	7^{7}	3	7^{7}
2	(Japan) Go Soeda	6^{2}	6	6^{5}

Final
(China) Zhang Ze	4	6	4
(Chinese Taipei) Jason Jung	6	2	6

=== Top half ===
First round
1/Alt	(Switzerland) H Laaksonen	7^{7}	2	0^{r}
(Italy) A Bega	6^{2}	6	2
(India) V Vardhan	1	1
(China) Ze Zhang	6	6
(Japan) Shuichi Sekiguchi	6	6
(Japan) K Takeuchi	4	3
WC	(China) C Wang	4	2
6	(Egypt) M Safwat	6	6
4	(Japan) Y Uchiyama	6	6
WC	(China) Zh Zhang	2	1
(South Korea) Kim Cheong-eui	7	6
(Australia) L Saville	5	4
WC	(China) F Sun	3	2
(Germany) M Bachinger	6	6
Q	(Netherlands) Miliaan Niesten	3	6	4
5	(Japan) H Moriya	6	4	6

Second round
(Italy) A Bega	2	4
(China) Ze Zhang	6	6
(Japan) S Sekiguchi	7^{7}	1	3
6	(Egypt) M Safwat	6^{5}	6	6
4	(Japan) Y Uchiyama	6	6
(South Korea) C-e Kim	3	1
(Germany) M Bachinger	6	4	0
5	(Japan) H Moriya	4	6	6

Quarterfinals
(China) Ze Zhang	7	6
6	(Egypt) M Safwat	5	3
4	(Japan) Y Uchiyama	3	5
5	(Japan) H Moriya	6	7

Semifinals
(China) Ze Zhang	6	6
5	(Japan) H Moriya	3	1

=== Bottom half ===
First round
7	(China) D Wu	6	6
(Russia) E Karlovskiy	3	3
(Russia) A Kudryavtsev	7^{7}	6^{5}	6
Q	(Australia) M Matosevic	6^{4}	7^{7}	2
WC	(China) X Gao	6	3	0
(Australia) D Kelly	3	6	6
(Chinese Taipei) J Jung	6	6
3	(South Korea) D-h Lee	4	1
8	(Chinese Taipei) T Chen	5	3
Q	(Australia) B Mousley	7	6
(Japan) Y Takahashi	7	6
(Japan) T Niki	5	1
(Italy) Lorenzo Frigerio	7^{7}	6
Q	(Japan) Yuya Kibi	6^{5}	4
(China) Z Li	4	2
2	(Japan) G Soeda	6	6

Second round
7	(China) D Wu	6	6
(Russia) A Kudryavtsev	4	3
(Australia) D Kelly	6	2	1
(Chinese Taipei) J Jung	3	6	6
Q	(Australia) B Mousley	4	7^{7}	6^{4}
(Japan) Y Takahashi	6	6^{3}	7^{7}
(Italy) L Frigerio	1	4
2	(Japan) G Soeda	6	6

Quarterfinals
7	(China) D Wu	6^{7}	3
(Chinese Taipei) J Jung	7^{9}	6
(Japan) Y Takahashi	2	0
2	(Japan) G Soeda	6	6

Semifinals
(Chinese Taipei) J Jung	7^{7}	3	7^{7}
2	(Japan) G Soeda	6^{2}	6	6^{5}
