= 2019 International Challenger Zhangjiagang – Singles =

Singles
- 2019 International Challenger Zhangjiagang

Final
- Champion: (Australia) Marc Polmans
- Runner-up: (Italy) Lorenzo Giustino
- Score: 6–4, 4–6, 7–6^{(7–4)}

Events
Singles	Doubles
- International Challenger Zhangjiagang

Yasutaka Uchiyama was the defending champion but chose not to defend his title.

Marc Polmans won the title after defeating Lorenzo Giustino 6–4, 4–6, 7–6^{(7–4)} in the final.

== Seeds ==
All seeds receive a bye into the second round.

1. (Canada) Brayden Schnur (second round)
2. (Australia) James Duckworth (third round)
3. (South Korea) Kwon Soon-woo (quarterfinals)
4. (Japan) Hiroki Moriya (third round)
5. (Japan) Yūichi Sugita (second round)
6. (Italy) Lorenzo Giustino (final)
7. (Slovenia) Blaž Rola (third round)
8. (China) Zhang Ze (quarterfinals)
9. (Japan) Go Soeda (second round)
10. (Australia) Marc Polmans (champion)
11. (Croatia) Viktor Galović (semifinals, withdrew)
12. (Egypt) Mohamed Safwat (second round)
13. (Italy) Stefano Napolitano (quarterfinals)
14. (Canada) Filip Peliwo (third round)
15. (France) Mathias Bourgue (semifinals)
16. (South Korea) Lee Duck-hee (withdrew)
17. (Belarus) Uladzimir Ignatik (quarterfinals)

== Draw ==
Key

- Q = Qualifier
- WC = Wild card
- LL = Lucky loser
- Alt = Alternate
- ITF = ITF entry
- PR = Protected ranking
- SR = Special ranking
- SE = Special exempt
- JE = Junior exempt
- JR = Junior Accelerator Programme entrant
- CO = College Accelerator Programme entrant
- NG = Next Gen Accelerator Program entrant
- w/o = Walkover
- r = Retired
- d = Defaulted

=== Finals ===
Quarterfinals
17	(Belarus) Uladzimir Ignatik	4	2
11	(Croatia) Viktor Galović	6	6
3	(South Korea) Kwon Soon-woo	3	2
6	(Italy) Lorenzo Giustino	6	6
8	(China) Zhang Ze	4	2
15	(France) Mathias Bourgue	6	6
10	(Australia) Marc Polmans	6	7
13	(Italy) Stefano Napolitano	3	5

Semifinals
11	(Croatia) Viktor Galović
6	(Italy) Lorenzo Giustino	w/o
15	(France) Mathias Bourgue	2	6	3
10	(Australia) Marc Polmans	6	4	6

Final
6	(Italy) Lorenzo Giustino	4	6	6^{4}
10	(Australia) Marc Polmans	6	4	7^{7}

=== Top half ===
==== Section 1 ====
First round
(Australia) A Harris	6	6
WC	(China) Y He	1	1
(China) Y Wu	2	6	2
(Portugal) G Oliveira	6	2	6
WC	(China) X Gao	5	4
(China) D Wu	7	6
(South Korea) Y-s Chung	6	6
Q	(China) F Sun	4	4

Second round
1	(Canada) B Schnur	4	7^{7}	6^{6}
(Australia) A Harris	6	6^{2}	7^{8}
(Portugal) G Oliveira	3	2
17	(Belarus) U Ignatik	6	6
11	(Croatia) V Galović	6	6
(China) D Wu	1	4
(South Korea) Y-s Chung	4	7	6
5	(Japan) Y Sugita	6	5	2

Third round
(Australia) A Harris	2	5
17	(Belarus) U Ignatik	6	7
11	(Croatia) V Galović	6	6
(South Korea) Y-s Chung	3	2

Quarterfinals
17	(Belarus) U Ignatik	4	2
11	(Croatia) V Galović	6	6

==== Section 2 ====
First round
(Brazil) G Clezar	7^{7}	6
Q	(Finland) H Heliövaara	6^{1}	3
(Russia) E Karlovskiy	6	7
ITF	(South Korea) Kim Cheong-eui	2	5
(Australia) A Santillan	2	1^{r}
(Australia) M Purcell	6	2
(Australia) M Banes	4	3
PR	(United States) D Nguyen	6	6

Second round
3	(South Korea) S-w Kwon	7^{8}	6
(Brazil) G Clezar	6^{6}	3
(Russia) E Karlovskiy	1	4
14	(Canada) F Peliwo	6	6
9	(Japan) G Soeda	6	6^{4}	1
(Australia) M Purcell	4	7^{7}	6
PR	(United States) D Nguyen	0	3
6	(Italy) L Giustino	6	6

Third round
3	(South Korea) S-w Kwon	6	6
14	(Canada) F Peliwo	4	2
(Australia) M Purcell	3	4
6	(Italy) L Giustino	6	6

Quarterfinals
3	(South Korea) S-w Kwon	3	2
6	(Italy) L Giustino	6	6

=== Bottom half ===
==== Section 3 ====
First round
(Chinese Taipei) T-h Yang	4	2
ITF	(Egypt) K-M Maamoun	6	6
(Australia) L Saville	7	3	6
(Japan) Renta Tokuda	5	6	3
ITF	(France) Baptiste Crepatte	2	1
(India) S Mukund	6	6
(Croatia) N Serdarušić	6^{1}	6	2
(Slovakia) A Molčan	7^{7}	4	6

Second round
8	(China) Ze Zhang	6	7^{7}
ITF	(Egypt) K-M Maamoun	0	6^{3}
(Australia) L Saville	6	6
12	(Egypt) M Safwat	4	2
15	(France) M Bourgue	7	6
(India) S Mukund	5	4
(Slovakia) A Molčan	6^{5}	6^{3}
4	(Japan) H Moriya	7^{7}	7^{7}

Third round
8	(China) Ze Zhang	6	2	6
(Australia) L Saville	4	6	4
15	(France) M Bourgue	7	4	6
4	(Japan) H Moriya	5	6	1

Quarterfinals
8	(China) Ze Zhang	4	2
15	(France) M Bourgue	6	6

==== Section 4 ====
First round
WC	(China) R Hua	4	3
WC	(China) Zh Zhang	6	6
(China) Z Li	6	3	4
(Dominican Republic) J Hernández-Fernández	1	6	6
ITF	(Russia) I Gakhov	6	1	4
Alt	(Japan) Makoto Ochi	3	6	6
WC	(China) Xia Zihao	1	7^{7}	6
(France) TK Wang	6	6^{1}	3

Second round
7	(Slovenia) B Rola	6	6
WC	(China) Zh Zhang	2	4
(Dominican Republic) J Hernández-Fernández	3	3
10	(Australia) M Polmans	6	6
13	(Italy) S Napolitano	2	6	6
Alt	(Japan) M Ochi	6	3	4
WC	(China) Z Xia	0	3
2	(Australia) J Duckworth	6	6

Third round
7	(Slovenia) B Rola	3	6^{5}
10	(Australia) M Polmans	6	7^{7}
13	(Italy) S Napolitano	6	3	7
2	(Australia) J Duckworth	4	6	5

Quarterfinals
10	(Australia) M Polmans	6	7
13	(Italy) S Napolitano	3	5
