= 2025 International Challenger Zhangjiagang =

- Date: 25 August – 1 September
- Edition: 6th
- Surface: Hard
- Location: Zhangjiagang, China

Champions

Singles
- (Japan) Sho Shimabukuro

Doubles
- (Switzerland) Luca Castelnuovo / (Australia) Akira Santillan
| ← 2024 · | International Challenger Zhangjiagang | · 2026 → |

The 2025 International Challenger Zhangjiagang was a professional tennis tournament played on hard courts. It was the sixth edition of the tournament which was part of the 2025 ATP Challenger Tour. It took place in Zhangjiagang, China between 25 August and 1 September 2025.

== Singles main-draw entrants ==
=== Seeds ===
| Country | Player | Rank^{1} | Seed |
|---|---|---|---|
| AUS | Bernard Tomic | 169 | 1 |
| JPN | Rio Noguchi | 196 | 2 |
| JPN | Sho Shimabukuro | 201 | 3 |
| CHN | Sun Fajing | 215 | 4 |
| JPN | Yasutaka Uchiyama | 227 | 5 |
| GBR | Oliver Crawford | 232 | 6 |
| | Ilia Simakin | 238 | 7 |
| FRA | Arthur Géa | 257 | 8 |

- ^{1} Rankings are as of 18 August 2025.

=== Other entrants ===
The following players received wildcards into the singles main draw:

- (China) Mo Yecong
- (China) Te Rigele
- (China) Xiao Linang

The following player received entry into the singles main draw using a protected ranking:

- (Australia) Philip Sekulic

The following players received entry into the singles main draw as alternates:

- (Switzerland) Luca Castelnuovo
- (Uzbekistan) Sergey Fomin
- (Japan) Renta Tokuda

The following players received entry from the qualifying draw:

- (Australia) Joshua Charlton
- (Chinese Taipei) Huang Tsung-hao
- (Japan) Yuta Kikuchi
- (Poland) Filip Peliwo
- (Japan) Kaichi Uchida
- (Japan) Kaito Uesugi

The following player received entry as a lucky loser:

- (New Zealand) James Watt

== Champions ==
=== Singles ===
- (Japan) Sho Shimabukuro def. (United Kingdom) Oliver Crawford 6–3, 3–6, 7–5.

=== Doubles ===
- (Switzerland) Luca Castelnuovo / (Australia) Akira Santillan def. Petr Bar Biryukov / (Italy) Alexandr Binda 6–3, 6–7^{(8–10)}, [10–3].
