= 2017 International Challenger Zhangjiagang – Doubles =

Doubles
- 2017 International Challenger Zhangjiagang

Final
- Champions: (China) Gao Xin (China) Zhang Zhizhen
- Runners-up: (Chinese Taipei) Chen Ti (Chinese Taipei) Yi Chu-huan
- Score: 6–2, 6–3

Events
Singles	Doubles
- International Challenger Zhangjiagang

This was the first edition of the tournament.

Gao Xin and Zhang Zhizhen won the title after defeating Chen Ti and Yi Chu-huan 6–2, 6–3 in the final.

== Seeds ==
1. (Chinese Taipei) Hsieh Cheng-peng / (Chinese Taipei) Peng Hsien-yin (semifinals)
2. (Japan) Toshihide Matsui / (India) Vishnu Vardhan (quarterfinals)
3. (Chinese Taipei) Chen Ti / (Chinese Taipei) Yi Chu-huan (final)
4. (Australia) Jarryd Chaplin / (Australia) Luke Saville (first round)

== Draw ==
Key

- Q = Qualifier
- WC = Wild card
- LL = Lucky loser
- Alt = Alternate
- ITF = ITF entry
- PR = Protected ranking
- SR = Special ranking
- SE = Special exempt
- JE = Junior exempt
- JR = Junior Accelerator Programme entrant
- CO = College Accelerator Programme entrant
- NG = Next Gen Accelerator Program entrant
- w/o = Walkover
- r = Retired
- d = Defaulted

First round
1	(Chinese Taipei) C-p Hsieh (Chinese Taipei) H-y Peng	6	6
(Russia) E Karlovskiy (Russia) A Kudryavtsev	1	4
(Japan) B McLachlan (Japan) Y Uchiyama	6	6
WC	(China) Li Jianhui (China) Li Yuanfeng	3	4
3	(Chinese Taipei) T Chen (Chinese Taipei) C-h Yi	6	3	[10]
(Chinese Taipei) J Jung (South Korea) D-h Lee	2	6	[8]
(Germany) M Bachinger (Australia) B Mousley	2	3
(Australia) D Kelly (Japan) Y Takahashi	6	6
(India) J Nedunchezhiyan (India) VS Prashanth	6	6
(Japan) H Moriya (China) Ze Zhang	1	4
(China) Z Li (China) D Wu	6	3	[11]
4	(Australia) Jarryd Chaplin (Australia) L Saville	1	6	[9]
(China) X Gao (China) Zh Zhang	6	2	[10]
WC	(China) Wu Hao (China) Xia Zihao	4	6	[4]
WC	(China) F Sun (China) C Wang	6^{2}	3
2	(Japan) T Matsui (India) V Vardhan	7^{7}	6

Quarterfinals
1	(Chinese Taipei) C-p Hsieh (Chinese Taipei) H-y Peng	6	6
(Japan) B McLachlan (Japan) Y Uchiyama	4	4
3	(Chinese Taipei) T Chen (Chinese Taipei) C-h Yi	7^{9}	6
(Australia) D Kelly (Japan) Y Takahashi	6^{7}	3
(India) J Nedunchezhiyan (India) VS Prashanth	5	6	[10]
(China) Z Li (China) D Wu	7	3	[7]
(China) X Gao (China) Zh Zhang	6	6
2	(Japan) T Matsui (India) V Vardhan	4	3

Semifinals
1	(Chinese Taipei) C-p Hsieh (Chinese Taipei) H-y Peng	4	7^{7}	[6]
3	(Chinese Taipei) T Chen (Chinese Taipei) C-h Yi	6	6^{5}	[10]
(India) J Nedunchezhiyan (India) VS Prashanth	4	2
(China) X Gao (China) Zh Zhang	6	6

Final
3	(Chinese Taipei) T Chen (Chinese Taipei) C-h Yi	2	3
(China) X Gao (China) Zh Zhang	6	6
