= 2017 International Challenger Zhangjiagang =

- Date: 5–10 September
- Edition: 1st
- Surface: Hard
- Location: Zhangjiagang, China

Champions

Singles
- (Chinese Taipei) Jason Jung

Doubles
- (China) Gao Xin / (China) Zhang Zhizhen
International Challenger Zhangjiagang	· 2018 →

The 2017 International Challenger Zhangjiagang was a professional tennis tournament played on hard courts. It was the first edition of the tournament which was part of the 2017 ATP Challenger Tour. It took place in Zhangjiagang, China between 5 and 10 September 2017.

== Singles main-draw entrants ==
=== Seeds ===
Country	Player	Rank^{1}	Seed
SUI	Henri Laaksonen	94	1
JPN	Go Soeda	130	2
KOR	Lee Duck-hee	163	3
JPN	Yasutaka Uchiyama	187	4
JPN	Hiroki Moriya	213	5
EGY	Mohamed Safwat	219	6
CHN	Wu Di	221	7
TPE	Chen Ti	257	8

- ^{1} Rankings are as of 28 August 2017.

=== Other entrants ===
The following players received wildcards into the singles main draw:

- (China) Gao Xin
- (China) Sun Fajing
- (China) Wang Chuhan
- (China) Zhang Zhizhen

The following player received entry into the singles main draw as an alternate:

- (Switzerland) Henri Laaksonen

The following players received entry from the qualifying draw:

- (Japan) Yuya Kibi
- (Australia) Marinko Matosevic
- (Australia) Bradley Mousley
- (Netherlands) Miliaan Niesten

== Champions ==
=== Singles ===
- (Chinese Taipei) Jason Jung def. (China) Zhang Ze 6–4, 2–6, 6–4.

=== Doubles ===
- (China) Gao Xin / (China) Zhang Zhizhen def. (Chinese Taipei) Chen Ti / (Chinese Taipei) Yi Chu-huan 6–2, 6–3.
