= 2026 International Challenger Zhangjiagang – Doubles =

Doubles
- 2026 International Challenger Zhangjiagang

Final
- Champions: (South Korea) Nam Ji-sung (South Korea) Park Ui-sung
- Runners-up: (Australia) Joshua Charlton (China) Wang Aoran
- Score: 6–3, 4–6, [13–11]

Events
Singles	Doubles
- International Challenger Zhangjiagang

Luca Castelnuovo and Akira Santillan were the defending champions but retired from their first round match against Christopher Papa and Zheng Baoluo.

Nam Ji-sung and Park Ui-sung won the title after defeating Joshua Charlton and Wang Aoran 6–3, 4–6, [13–11] in the final.

== Seeds ==
1. (Netherlands) Thijmen Loof / (Japan) Kaito Uesugi (semifinals)
2. (India) Arjun Kadhe / (Japan) Takeru Yuzuki (first round)
3. (Chinese Taipei) Hsieh Cheng-peng / (Thailand) Pruchya Isaro (first round)
4. (South Korea) Nam Ji-sung / (South Korea) Park Ui-sung (champions)

== Draw ==
Key

- Q = Qualifier
- WC = Wild card
- LL = Lucky loser
- Alt = Alternate
- ITF = ITF entry
- PR = Protected ranking
- SR = Special ranking
- SE = Special exempt
- JE = Junior exempt
- JR = Junior Accelerator Programme entrant
- CO = College Accelerator Programme entrant
- NG = Next Gen Accelerator Program entrant
- w/o = Walkover
- r = Retired
- d = Defaulted

First round
1	(Netherlands) T Loof (Japan) K Uesugi	6	6
(Chinese Taipei) J Hsu (Chinese Taipei) T-l Wu	2	4
P Bar Biryukov (Kazakhstan) G Lomakin	6	4	[6]
(Chinese Taipei) Y-h Hsu (China) F Sun	2	6	[10]
4	(South Korea) J-s Nam (South Korea) U-s Park	7	6
(Chinese Taipei) T-h Huang (Japan) M Imamura	5	4
WC	(China) Jiang Fumin (China) Zhang Tianhui	5	3
Alt	(China) J Cui (India) SDP Dev	7	6
WC	(China) Kong Weiyi (China) Meng Fanming	7^{7}	5	[5]
(Australia) Ja Delaney (Australia) Je Delaney	6^{5}	7	[10]
(Japan) J Trotter (Japan) K Uchida	6	7^{7}
3	(Chinese Taipei) C-p Hsieh (Thailand) P Isaro	3	6^{3}
(United States) C Papa (China) B Zheng	4
(Switzerland) L Castelnuovo (Japan) A Santillan	3^{r}
(Australia) J Charlton (China) A Wang	7	6^{4}	[10]
2	(India) A Kadhe (Japan) T Yuzuki	5	7^{7}	[5]

Quarterfinals
1	(Netherlands) T Loof (Japan) K Uesugi	6	6
(Chinese Taipei) Y-h Hsu (China) F Sun	2	3
4	(South Korea) J-s Nam (South Korea) U-s Park	6	6
Alt	(China) J Cui (India) SDP Dev	4	4
(Australia) Ja Delaney (Australia) Je Delaney	6	7^{7}
(Japan) J Trotter (Japan) K Uchida	4	6^{5}
(United States) C Papa (China) B Zheng	6^{3}	3
(Australia) J Charlton (China) A Wang	7^{7}	6

Semifinals
1	(Netherlands) T Loof (Japan) K Uesugi	6^{9}	6	[6]
4	(South Korea) J-s Nam (South Korea) U-s Park	7^{11}	0	[10]
(Australia) Ja Delaney (Australia) Je Delaney	6^{2}	7^{8}	[9]
(Australia) J Charlton (China) A Wang	7^{7}	6^{6}	[11]

Final
4	(South Korea) J-s Nam (South Korea) U-s Park	6	4	[13]
(Australia) J Charlton (China) A Wang	3	6	[11]
