= 2019 International Challenger Zhangjiagang =

- Date: 18–24 March
- Edition: 3rd
- Surface: Hard
- Location: Zhangjiagang, China

Champions

Singles
- (Australia) Marc Polmans

Doubles
- (Australia) Max Purcell / (Australia) Luke Saville
← 2018 ·	International Challenger Zhangjiagang	· 2023 →

The 2019 International Challenger Zhangjiagang was a professional tennis tournament played on hard courts. It was the third edition of the tournament which was part of the 2019 ATP Challenger Tour. It took place in Zhangjiagang, China between 18 and 24 March 2019.

== Singles main-draw entrants ==
=== Seeds ===
Country	Player	Rank^{1}	Seed
CAN	Brayden Schnur	106	1
AUS	James Duckworth	166	2
KOR	Kwon Soon-woo	170	3
JPN	Hiroki Moriya	174	4
JPN	Yūichi Sugita	176	5
ITA	Lorenzo Giustino	189	6
SLO	Blaž Rola	199	7
CHN	Zhang Ze	201	8
JPN	Go Soeda	205	9
AUS	Marc Polmans	210	10
CRO	Viktor Galović	213	11
EGY	Mohamed Safwat	216	12
ITA	Stefano Napolitano	229	13
CAN	Filip Peliwo	233	14
FRA	Mathias Bourgue	239	15
~~KOR~~	~~Lee Duck-hee~~	~~244~~	~~16~~
BLR	Uladzimir Ignatik	245	17

- ^{1} Rankings are as of 4 March 2019.

=== Other entrants ===
The following players received wildcards into the singles main draw:

- (China) Gao Xin
- (China) He Yecong
- (China) Hua Runhao
- (China) Xia Zihao
- (China) Zhang Zhizhen

The following player received entry into the singles main draw using a protected ranking:

- (United States) Daniel Nguyen

The following player received entry into the singles main draw as an alternate:

- (Japan) Makoto Ochi

The following players received entry into the singles main draw using their ITF World Tennis Ranking:

- (France) Baptiste Crepatte
- (Russia) Ivan Gakhov
- (South Korea) Kim Cheong-eui
- (Egypt) Karim-Mohamed Maamoun

The following players received entry from the qualifying draw:

- (Finland) Harri Heliövaara
- (China) Sun Fajing

== Champions ==
=== Singles ===
- (Australia) Marc Polmans def. (Italy) Lorenzo Giustino 6–4, 4–6, 7–6^{(7–4)}.

=== Doubles ===
- (Australia) Max Purcell / (Australia) Luke Saville def. (India) Sriram Balaji / (Mexico) Hans Hach Verdugo 6–2, 7–6^{(7–5)}.
