= 2018 International Challenger Zhangjiagang =

- Date: 3–9 September
- Edition: 2nd
- Surface: Hard
- Location: Zhangjiagang, China

Champions

Singles
- (Japan) Yasutaka Uchiyama

Doubles
- (China) Gong Maoxin / (China) Zhang Ze
- International Challenger Zhangjiagang

The 2018 International Challenger Zhangjiagang was a professional tennis tournament played on hard courts. It was the second edition of the tournament which was part of the 2018 ATP Challenger Tour. It took place in Zhangjiagang, China between 3 and 9 September 2018.

== Singles main-draw entrants ==
=== Seeds ===
Country	Player	Rank^{1}	Seed
TPE	Jason Jung	115	1
JPN	Tatsuma Ito	163	2
CHN	Zhang Ze	168	3
JPN	Go Soeda	176	4
CAN	Filip Peliwo	185	5
SRB	Miomir Kecmanović	196	6
JPN	Hiroki Moriya	197	7
KAZ	Alexander Bublik	203	8

- ^{1} Rankings are as of 27 August 2018.

=== Other entrants ===
The following players received wildcards into the singles main draw:

- (China) He Yecong
- (China) Te Rigele
- (China) Wu Yibing
- (China) Zhang Zhizhen

The following players received entry from the qualifying draw:

- (Portugal) Frederico Ferreira Silva
- (Australia) Dayne Kelly
- (France) Tristan Lamasine
- (Japan) Yuta Shimizu

The following player received entry as a lucky loser:

- (Japan) Yusuke Takahashi

== Champions ==
=== Singles ===
- (Japan) Yasutaka Uchiyama def. (Chinese Taipei) Jason Jung 6–2, 6–2.

=== Doubles ===
- (China) Gong Maoxin / (China) Zhang Ze def. (Australia) Bradley Mousley / (Australia) Akira Santillan walkover.
