= 2024 International Challenger Zhangjiagang – Doubles =

Doubles
- 2024 International Challenger Zhangjiagang

Final
- Champions: (Japan) Kaichi Uchida (Japan) Takeru Yuzuki
- Runners-up: (Philippines) Francis Alcantara (Thailand) Pruchya Isaro
- Score: 6–1, 7–5

Events
Singles	Doubles
- International Challenger Zhangjiagang

Ray Ho and Matthew Romios were the defending champions but only Ho chose to defend his title, partnering Nam Ji-sung. They lost in the first round to Ajeet Rai and Finn Reynolds.

Kaichi Uchida and Takeru Yuzuki won the title after defeating Francis Alcantara and Pruchya Isaro 6–1, 7–5 in the final.

== Seeds ==
1. (India) Rithvik Choudary Bollipalli / (India) Arjun Kadhe (quarterfinals)
2. (Chinese Taipei) Ray Ho / (South Korea) Nam Ji-sung (first round)
3. (Japan) Toshihide Matsui / (Japan) Kaito Uesugi (quarterfinals)
4. (Australia) Blake Bayldon / (Australia) Thomas Fancutt (first round)

== Draw ==
Key

- Q = Qualifier
- WC = Wild card
- LL = Lucky loser
- Alt = Alternate
- ITF = ITF entry
- PR = Protected ranking
- SR = Special ranking
- SE = Special exempt
- JE = Junior exempt
- JR = Junior Accelerator Programme entrant
- CO = College Accelerator Programme entrant
- NG = Next Gen Accelerator Program entrant
- w/o = Walkover
- r = Retired
- d = Defaulted

=== Draw ===
First round
1	(India) RC Bollipalli (India) A Kadhe	6	6^{3}	[10]
Alt	(South Africa) P Henning (South Africa) Kris van Wyk	3	7^{7}	[8]
(France) T Lamasine (Czech Republic) D Svrčina	7	4^{d}
Alt	Mikalai Haliak (Slovakia) L Pokorný	5	5
3	(Japan) T Matsui (Japan) K Uesugi	6	6^{4}	[10]
WC	(China) Y Bai (China) Dong Zhenxiong	2	7^{7}	[4]
(Greece) M Kalovelonis (Ukraine) Vadym Ursu	2	7	[8]
(Japan) K Uchida (Japan) T Yuzuki	6	5	[10]
E Donskoy; E Karlovskiy	6	6
WC	(China) Sun Qian (China) S Tang	3	3
(Chinese Taipei) Y-h Hsu (China) F Sun	7^{11}	6
4	(Australia) B Bayldon (Australia) T Fancutt	6^{9}	1
(Philippines) FC Alcantara (Thailand) P Isaro	4	7^{7}	[10]
(Japan) R Noguchi (Japan) S Watanabe	6	6^{4}	[7]
(New Zealand) A Rai (New Zealand) F Reynolds	6	6
2	(Chinese Taipei) R Ho (South Korea) J-s Nam	3	2

Quarterfinals
1	(India) RC Bollipalli (India) A Kadhe	4	6	[6]
Alt	M Haliak (Slovakia) L Pokorný	6	2	[10]
3	(Japan) T Matsui (Japan) K Uesugi	5	7^{7}	[9]
(Japan) K Uchida (Japan) T Yuzuki	7	6^{3}	[11]
E Donskoy; E Karlovskiy	6^{0}	4
(Chinese Taipei) Y-h Hsu (China) F Sun	7^{7}	6
(Philippines) FC Alcantara (Thailand) P Isaro	6	6^{7}	[10]
(New Zealand) A Rai (New Zealand) F Reynolds	3	7^{9}	[6]

Semifinals
Alt	M Haliak (Slovakia) L Pokorný	6^{9}	3
(Japan) K Uchida (Japan) T Yuzuki	7^{11}	6
(Chinese Taipei) Y-h Hsu (China) F Sun	4	3
(Philippines) FC Alcantara (Thailand) P Isaro	6	6

Final
(Japan) K Uchida (Japan) T Yuzuki	6	7
(Philippines) FC Alcantara (Thailand) P Isaro	1	5
