= 2019 International Challenger Zhangjiagang – Doubles =

Doubles
- 2019 International Challenger Zhangjiagang

Final
- Champions: (Australia) Max Purcell (Australia) Luke Saville
- Runners-up: (India) Sriram Balaji (Mexico) Hans Hach Verdugo
- Score: 6–2, 7–6^{(7–5)}

Events
Singles	Doubles
← 2018 ·	International Challenger Zhangjiagang	· 2023 →

Gong Maoxin and Zhang Ze were the defending champions but lost in the quarterfinals to Ruben Gonzales and Alex Lawson.

Max Purcell and Luke Saville won the title after defeating Sriram Balaji and Hans Hach Verdugo 6–2, 7–6^{(7–5)} in the final.

== Seeds ==
1. (Chinese Taipei) Hsieh Cheng-peng / (Indonesia) Christopher Rungkat (semifinals)
2. (China) Gong Maoxin / (China) Zhang Ze (quarterfinals)
3. (Australia) Max Purcell / (Australia) Luke Saville (champions)
4. (India) Sriram Balaji / (Mexico) Hans Hach Verdugo (final)

== Draw ==
=== Key ===
- Q = Qualifier
- WC = Wild card
- LL = Lucky loser
- Alt = Alternate
- SE = Special exempt
- PR = Protected ranking
- ITF = ITF entry
- JE = Junior exempt
- w/o = Walkover
- r = Retired
- d = Defaulted
- SR = Special ranking

First round
1	(Chinese Taipei) C-p Hsieh (Indonesia) C Rungkat	2	7^{7}	[11]
WC	(China) X Gao (China) F Sun	6	6^{5}	[9]
ITF	(Philippines) F Alcantara (Portugal) B Saraiva	2	6	[5]
(Switzerland) L Margaroli (India) V Vardhan	6	4	[10]
4	(India) S Balaji (Mexico) H Hach Verdugo	7	6^{3}	[10]
(Finland) H Heliövaara (Chile) H Podlipnik Castillo	5	7^{7}	[8]
WC	(China) R Hua (China) Zh Zhang	4	6	[10]
WC	(China) Xia Zihao (China) Zeng Shihong	6	2	[4]
ITF	(United States) JP Fruttero (Russia) I Gakhov	6	6
Alt	(South Korea) Y-s Chung (South Korea) S-w Kwon	4	4
(Japan) H Moriya (Chinese Taipei) T-h Yang	4	6	[4]
3	(Australia) M Purcell (Australia) L Saville	6	3	[10]
(Philippines) R Gonzales (United States) A Lawson	w/o
(Dominican Republic) J Hernández-Fernández (Canada) B Schnur
(Japan) T Matsui (Thailand) So Ratiwatana	4	0
2	(China) M Gong (China) Ze Zhang	6	6

Quarterfinals
1	(Chinese Taipei) C-p Hsieh (Indonesia) C Rungkat	4	6	[10]
(Switzerland) L Margaroli (India) V Vardhan	6	1	[6]
4	(India) S Balaji (Mexico) H Hach Verdugo	3	7^{7}	[10]
WC	(China) R Hua (China) Zh Zhang	6	6^{4}	[5]
ITF	(United States) JP Fruttero (Russia) I Gakhov	2	1
3	(Australia) M Purcell (Australia) L Saville	6	6
(Philippines) R Gonzales (United States) A Lawson	7^{7}	7
2	(China) M Gong (China) Ze Zhang	6^{5}	5

Semifinals
1	(Chinese Taipei) C-p Hsieh (Indonesia) C Rungkat	4	3
4	(India) S Balaji (Mexico) H Hach Verdugo	6	6
3	(Australia) M Purcell (Australia) L Saville	6	6
(Philippines) R Gonzales (United States) A Lawson	3	3

Final
4	(India) S Balaji (Mexico) H Hach Verdugo	2	6^{5}
3	(Australia) M Purcell (Australia) L Saville	6	7^{7}
