= 2023 International Challenger Zhangjiagang =

- Date: 28 August – 3 September
- Edition: 4th
- Surface: Hard
- Location: Zhangjiagang, China

Champions

Singles
- (France) Térence Atmane

Doubles
- (Chinese Taipei) Ray Ho / (Australia) Matthew Romios
- International Challenger Zhangjiagang

The 2023 International Challenger Zhangjiagang was a professional tennis tournament played on hard courts. It was the fourth edition of the tournament which was part of the 2023 ATP Challenger Tour. It took place in Zhangjiagang, China between 28 August and 3 September 2023.

== Singles main-draw entrants ==
=== Seeds ===
Country	Player	Rank^{1}	Seed
CHN	Bu Yunchaokete	215	1
FRA	Térence Atmane	218	2
JPN	Kaichi Uchida	240	3
JPN	Rio Noguchi	251	4
AUS	Li Tu	255	5
~~TPE~~	~~Jason Jung~~	~~256~~	~~6~~
LTU	Ričardas Berankis	257	7
AUS	James McCabe	281	8

- ^{1} Rankings are as of 21 August 2023.

=== Other entrants ===
The following players received wildcards into the singles main draw:

- (China) Li Hanwen
- (China) Sun Fajing
- (China) Te Rigele

The following players received entry into the singles main draw as alternates:

- (United States) Alafia Ayeni
- (New Zealand) Rubin Statham

The following players received entry from the qualifying draw:

- (China) ~~Bai Yan~~
- (China) Cui Jie
- Mikalai Haliak
- (China) Liu Hanyi
- (Bulgaria) Leonid Sheyngezikht
- (China) Xiao Linang

The following players received entry as lucky losers:

- (Northern Mariana Islands) Colin Sinclair
- (Japan) Yusuke Takahashi

== Champions ==
=== Singles ===
- (France) Térence Atmane def. Mikalai Haliak 6–1, 6–2.

=== Doubles ===
- (Chinese Taipei) Ray Ho / (Australia) Matthew Romios def. (Philippines) Francis Alcantara / (China) Sun Fajing 6–3, 6–4.
