= 2024 International Challenger Zhangjiagang =

- Date: 26 August – 1 September
- Edition: 5th
- Surface: Hard
- Location: Zhangjiagang, China

Champions

Singles
- (Japan) Yasutaka Uchiyama

Doubles
- (Japan) Kaichi Uchida / (Japan) Takeru Yuzuki
- International Challenger Zhangjiagang

The 2024 International Challenger Zhangjiagang was a professional tennis tournament played on hard courts. It was the fifth edition of the tournament which was part of the 2024 ATP Challenger Tour. It took place in Zhangjiagang, China between 26 August and 1 September 2024.

== Singles main-draw entrants ==
=== Seeds ===
Country	Player	Rank^{1}	Seed
HKG	Coleman Wong	153	1
KOR	Hong Seong-chan	154	2
TPE	Hsu Yu-hsiou	185	3
JPN	Yasutaka Uchiyama	197	4
AUS	Marc Polmans	201	5
KAZ	Beibit Zhukayev	217	6
EST	Mark Lajal	250	7
	Egor Gerasimov	256	8

- ^{1} Rankings are as of 19 August 2024.

=== Other entrants ===
The following players received wildcards into the singles main draw:

- (China) Tang Sheng
- (China) Wu Yibing
- (China) Zhou Yi

The following player received entry into the singles main draw as an alternate:

- (South Africa) Philip Henning

The following players received entry from the qualifying draw:

- Egor Agafonov
- (Slovakia) Norbert Gombos
- (Slovakia) Lukáš Pokorný
- (New Zealand) Ajeet Rai
- (Japan) Yusuke Takahashi
- (South Africa) Kris van Wyk

The following player received entry as a lucky loser:

- Evgeny Donskoy

== Champions ==
=== Singles ===
- (Japan) Yasutaka Uchiyama def. (Estonia) Mark Lajal 6–7^{(4–7)}, 6–2, 6–2.

=== Doubles ===
- (Japan) Kaichi Uchida / (Japan) Takeru Yuzuki def. (Philippines) Francis Alcantara / (Thailand) Pruchya Isaro 6–1, 7–5.
