= Oliver Crawford (tennis) =

British tennis player (born 1999)

- Crawford at the 2026 Wimbledon qualifying competition
- Country (sports): United States (2020–2024); United Kingdom (2024–present)
- Born: 30 April 1999 (age 27) Spartanburg, South Carolina, United States
- Height: 1.80 m (5 ft 11 in)
- Turned pro: 2020
- Plays: Right-handed (two-handed backhand)
- College: University of Florida
- Coach: Nick Bybel
- Prize money: US $617,475

Singles
- Career record: 0–1
- Career titles: 0
- Highest ranking: No. 183 (15 September 2025)
- Current ranking: No. 224 (24 August 2026)

Grand Slam singles results
- Australian Open: Q3 (2024)
- French Open: Q1 (2024, 2026)
- Wimbledon: 1R (2025)
- US Open: Q2 (2025)

Doubles
- Career record: 0–1
- Career titles: 0
- Highest ranking: No. 316 (23 September 2024)

Grand Slam doubles results
- Wimbledon: 1R (2024)
- Last updated on: 19 May 2026.

Oliver Crawford (born 30 April 1999) is an American-British tennis player. He has a career-high ATP singles ranking of world No. 183 achieved on 15 September 2025 and a doubles ranking of No. 316 achieved on 23 September 2024. He has won 13 ITF Men's World Tennis Tour titles from 27 finals.

== Early life ==
Crawford started playing tennis at two years-old. His parents had no tennis background. His parents are from Birmingham, England and moved to work in Spartanburg, South Carolina, before he was born. He graduated from Laurel Springs School, an online high school based in California, and attended the University of Florida. He was named SEC Freshmen of the Year and before turning professional in 2020, was twice included as a First Team All-SEC and a three-time ITA All-America.

== Career ==
=== 2018: Juniors ===
A former world No. 9 junior player, Crawford won his first senior title in October 2018 at a $25,000 USTA Pro Circuit event in Harlingen, Texas.

=== 2020–2022: Pro beginnings, top 350 ===
In March, Crawford won his third title on the ITF Tour when he defeated American Zane Khan in the final of an M15 tournament in Pune, India.

=== 2023–2024: Grand Slam doubles debut ===
In his first event representing Britain, Crawford defeated Ilya Ivashka in the first round of qualifying for the 2024 Australian Open. He followed that with a win over Francesco Passaro in the second round. He lost to Vít Kopřiva in the final qualifying round. He reached the final of the $25,000 ITF men's tennis tournament at the Arera Club in Bhopal on 21 January 2024 but had to award his opponent Bogdan Bobrov a walkover due to a back injury.

Crawford made his Grand Slam debut partnering Kyle Edmund in the men's doubles at the 2024 Wimbledon Championships, losing in the first round to Sadio Doumbia and Fabien Reboul in straight sets.

=== 2025: Major singles debut at Wimbledon ===
Crawford was awarded a wildcard to make his Grand Slam main-draw singles debut at the 2025 Wimbledon Championships, where he lost to Mattia Bellucci in the first round. At the 2025 International Challenger Zhangjiagang Crawford reached his third Challenger final but lost to Sho Shimabukuro.

== Personal life ==
Although born in South Carolina after his parents left Britain in 1999, many of his extended family still live in Sutton Coldfield and London. Crawford started representing Great Britain in January 2024.

== Performance timeline ==
Key
W	F	SF	QF	#R	RR	Q#	DNQ	A	NH

(W) winner; (F) finalist; (SF) semifinalist; (QF) quarterfinalist; (#R) rounds 4, 3, 2, 1; (RR) round-robin stage; (Q#) qualification round; (DNQ) did not qualify; (A) absent; (NH) not held; (SR) strike rate (events won / competed); (W–L) win–loss record.

=== Singles ===
Tournament	2022	2023	2024	2025	2026	SR	W–L	Win %
Grand Slam tournaments
Australian Open	A	A	Q3	A	Q1	0 / 0	0–0	–
French Open	A	A	Q1	A		0 / 0	0–0	–
Wimbledon	A	A	Q1	1R		0 / 1	0–1	0%
US Open	Q1	A	Q1	Q2		0 / 0	0–0	–
Win–loss	0–0	0–0	0–0	0–1	0–0	0 / 1	0–1	0%
ATP Masters 1000
Indian Wells Masters	A	A	A	A		0 / 0	0–0	–
Miami Open	A	A	A	A		0 / 0	0–0	–
Monte Carlo Masters	A	A	A	A		0 / 0	0–0	–
Madrid Open	A	A	A	A		0 / 0	0-0	–
Italian Open	A	A	A	A		0 / 0	0–0	–
Canadian Open	A	A	A	A		0 / 0	0–0	–
Cincinnati Masters	A	A	A	A		0 / 0	0–0	–
Shanghai Masters	NH	A	A	A		0 / 0	0–0	–
Paris Masters	A	A	A	A		0 / 0	0–0	–
Win–loss	0–0	0–0	0–0	0–0	0–0	0 / 0	0–0	–

== ATP Challenger and ITF Futures/World Tennis Tour finals ==
=== Singles: 34 (14 titles, 20 runner-ups) ===
Legend (singles) ATP Challenger Tour (0–4) ITF Futures/WTT (14–16)	Finals by surface Hard (9–9) Clay (5–11) Grass (0–0) Carpet (0–0)

Result	W–L	Date	Tournament	Tier	Surface	Opponent	Score
Loss	0–1	Oct 2023	Charleston, USA	Challenger	Hard	(Jordan) Abdullah Shelbayh	2–6, 7–6^{(7–5)}, 3–6
Loss	0–2	Oct 2023	Curitiba, Brazil	Challenger	Clay	(Bolivia) Hugo Dellien	6–7^{(6–8)}, 6–4, 6–7^{(1–7)}
Loss	0–3	Aug 2025	Zhangjiagang, China	Challenger	Hard	(Japan) Sho Shimabukuro	3–6, 6–3, 5–7
Loss	0–4	Feb 2026	Delhi, India	Challenger	Hard	(Greece) Stefanos Sakellaridis	5–7, 6–4, 6–7^{(6–8)}
Win	1–0	Oct 2018	USA F28, Harlingen	Futures	Hard	(United Kingdom) Andrew Watson	6–1, 6–1
Loss	1–1	Jul 2019	M25 Champaign, USA	WTT	Hard	(United States) Jenson Brooksby	2–6, 1–6
Win	2–1	Dec 2020	M15 Santo Domingo, Dominican Republic	WTT	Hard	(United States) Alex Rybakov	6–3, 6–1
Loss	2–2	Dec 2020	M15 Santo Domingo, Dominican Republic	WTT	Hard	(Dominican Republic) Nick Hardt	4–6, 0–6
Win	3–2	Mar 2021	M15 Pune, India	WTT	Hard	(India) Zane Khan	6–3, 6–0
Loss	3–3	Mar 2021	M15 New Delhi, India	WTT	Hard	(India) Niki Kaliyanda Poonacha	3–6, 6–7^{(5–7)}
Win	4–3	Apr 2021	M15 Cairo, Egypt	WTT	Clay	(Poland) Daniel Michalski	6–2, 5–7, 6–3
Loss	4–4	Sep 2021	M25 Sierre, Switzerland	WTT	Clay	(Australia) Rinky Hijikata	6–7^{(6–8)}, 1–6
Loss	4–5	Mar 2022	M25 Medellín, Colombia	WTT	Clay	(Zimbabwe) Benjamin Lock	6–7^{(3–7)}, 6–4, 6–7^{(5–7)}
Loss	4–6	Jul 2022	M25 Bourg-en-Bresse, France	WTT	Clay	(France) Ugo Blanchet	4–6, 6–7^{(4–7)}
Loss	4–7	Jul 2022	M25 Telfs, Austria	WTT	Clay	(Turkey) Ergi Kırkın	4–6, 5–7
Win	5–7	Jul 2022	M25 Bacău, Romania	WTT	Clay	(Tunisia) Moez Echargui	2–6, 6–3, 7–5
Win	6–7	Nov 2022	M25 Indore, India	WTT	Hard	(Czech Republic) Dominik Palán	6–1, 1–6, 6–3
Win	7–7	Feb 2023	M25 Monastir, Tunisia	WTT	Hard	(Tunisia) Moez Echargui	2–6, 6–4, 6–1
Loss	7–8	May 2023	M25 Värnamo, Sweden	WTT	Clay	(Sweden) Dragoș Nicolae Mădăraș	6–7^{(4–7)}, 1–6
Win	8–8	Jul 2023	M25 Klosters, Switzerland	WTT	Clay	(Switzerland) Damien Wenger	6–1, 6–3
Loss	8–9	Jul 2023	M25 Gandia, Spain	WTT	Clay	(Spain) Sergi Pérez Contri	3–6, 5–7
Loss	8–10	Aug 2023	M25 Oldenzaal, Netherlands	WTT	Clay	(Germany) Lucas Gerch	5–7, 0–6
Loss	8–11	Sep 2023	M25 Kigali, Rwanda	WTT	Clay	(Switzerland) Damien Wenger	4–6, 2–6
Loss	8–12	Sep 2023	M25 Kigali, Rwanda	WTT	Clay	(France) Corentin Denolly	6–1, 4–6, 4–6
Loss	8–13	Jan 2024	M25 Bhopal, India	WTT	Hard	Bogdan Bobrov	walkover
Win	9–13	Jul 2024	M25 The Hague, Netherlands	WTT	Clay	(Spain) Àlex Martí Pujolràs	6–0, 6–1
Win	10–13	Jan 2025	M25 Chennai, India	WTT	Hard	(Ukraine) Eric Vanshelboim	5–7, 6–3, 7–6^{(7–5)}
Loss	10–14	Jan 2025	M15 Zahra, Kuwait	WTT	Hard	(Germany) Lucas Gerch	6–2, 4–6, 4–6
Loss	10–15	Feb 2025	M15 Villena, Spain	WTT	Hard	(United States) Darwin Blanch	6–1, 5–7, 5–7
Win	11–15	Mar 2025	M25 Lu'an, China	WTT	Hard	(South Korea) Chung Hyeon	4–6, 6–3, 6–2
Win	12–15	Mar 2025	M25 Shenzhen, China	WTT	Hard	(China) Bai Yan	7–6^{(7–5)}, 1–6, 6–2
Win	13–15	Apr 2025	M25 Bengaluru, India	WTT	Hard	(United Kingdom) Jay Clarke	5–2 ret.
Loss	13–16	May 2025	M25 Sabadell, Spain	WTT	Clay	(Spain) Daniel Mérida	4–6, 6–2, 6–7^{(5–7)}
Win	14–16	May 2026	M25 Grado, Italy	WTT	Clay	(Italy) Gianmarco Ferrari	7–6^{(9–7)}, 6–2
