= Kasidit Samrej =

Thai tennis player (born 2001)

- Country (sports): Thailand
- Born: 26 January 2001 (age 25) Bangkok, Thailand
- Height: 1.91 m (6 ft 3 in)
- Plays: Right-handed (two-handed backhand)
- Coach: Werapath Sirijariyaporn, Vittaya Samrej
- Prize money: US $205,813

Singles
- Career record: 3–9 (at ATP Tour level, Grand Slam level, and in Davis Cup)
- Career titles: 0
- Highest ranking: No. 346 (25 August 2025)
- Current ranking: No. 387 (14 September 2026)

Grand Slam singles results
- Australian Open: 1R (2025)

Doubles
- Career record: 0–2 (at ATP Tour level, Grand Slam level, and in Davis Cup)
- Career titles: 0
- Highest ranking: No. 673 (18 May 2026)
- Current ranking: No. 760 (14 September 2026)
Medal record
Men's Tennis
Representing Thailand
SEA Games
Gold medal – first place	2021 Vietnam	Team
Gold medal – first place	2023 Cambodia	Team
Silver medal – second place	2025 Thailand	Singles
Bronze medal – third place	2021 Vietnam	Mixed doubles
Bronze medal – third place	2023 Cambodia	Singles
World University Games
Silver medal – second place	2021 Chengdu	Singles
- Last updated on: 18 September 2026.

Kasidit Samrej (Thai: กษิดิศ สำเร็จ; born 26 January 2001) is a Thai tennis player. He has a career high ATP singles ranking of world No. 346 achieved on 25 August 2025 and a career high ATP doubles ranking of No. 673 achieved on 18 May 2026. He is currently the No. 1 Thai player.

Samrej represents Thailand at the Davis Cup, where he has a W/L record of 10–8.

Samrej won the Asia-Pacific Wildcard Playoff for the 2025 Australian Open, making him the first Thai man to compete in the singles event in a Grand Slam tournament since Danai Udomchoke at the 2012 Australian Open. He lost in the first round to fifth seed Daniil Medvedev in five sets.

== Performance timeline ==
Key
W	F	SF	QF	#R	RR	Q#	DNQ	A	NH

(W) winner; (F) finalist; (SF) semifinalist; (QF) quarterfinalist; (#R) rounds 4, 3, 2, 1; (RR) round-robin stage; (Q#) qualification round; (DNQ) did not qualify; (A) absent; (NH) not held; (SR) strike rate (events won / competed); (W–L) win–loss record.

=== Singles ===
Tournament	2025	2026	SR	W–L	Win %
Grand Slam tournaments
Australian Open	1R		0 / 1	0–1	0%
French Open			0 / 0	0–0	–
Wimbledon			0 / 0	0–0	–
US Open			0 / 0	0–0	–
Win–loss	0–0	0–0	0 / 0	0–0	–

== ATP Challenger and ITF World Tennis Tour finals ==
=== Singles: 13 (6–7) ===
Legend ATP Challenger Tour (0–1) ITF World Tennis Tour (6–6)	Finals by surface Hard (6–7) Clay (0–0) Grass (0–0) Carpet (0–0)

Result	W–L	Date	Tournament	Tier	Surface	Opponent	Score
Win	1–0	Jun 2022	M25 Chiang Rai, Thailand	World Tennis Tour	Hard	(Russia) Konstantin Kravchuk	6–3, 7–6^{(7–3)}
Loss	1–1	Jun 2023	M25 Nakhon Si Thammarat, Thailand	World Tennis Tour	Hard	(Japan) Hiroki Moriya	6–2, 2–6, 2–6
Loss	1–2	Aug 2023	M15 Nakhon Si Thammarat, Thailand	World Tennis Tour	Hard	(Kazakhstan) Grigoriy Lomakin	6–7^{(2–7)}, 6–4, 3–6
Win	2–2	Jul 2024	M15 Nakhon Si Thammarat, Thailand	World Tennis Tour	Hard	(Malaysia) Mitsuki Wei Kang Leong	6–4, 6–3
Win	3–2	Jul 2024	M15 Nakhon Si Thammarat, Thailand	World Tennis Tour	Hard	(Thailand) Pawit Sornlaksup	6–3, 6–2
Loss	3–3	Aug 2024	M15 Nakhon Si Thammarat, Thailand	World Tennis Tour	Hard	Ilia Simakin	3–6, 4–6
Win	4–3	Sep 2024	M25 Nakhon Si Thammarat, Thailand	World Tennis Tour	Hard	(India) Sasikumar Mukund	6–3, 6–3
Loss	4–4	Jul 2025	M15 Ma'anshan, China	World Tennis Tour	Hard	(Japan) Koki Matsuda	1–6, 6–7^{(7–9)}
Loss	4–5	Jul 2025	M15 Ma'anshan, China	World Tennis Tour	Hard	(Australia) Akira Santillan	6–3, 3–6, 6–7^{(5–7)}
Win	5–5	Aug 2025	M15 Singapore, Singapore	World Tennis Tour	Hard (i)	(Japan) Sora Fukuda	6–1, 5–7, 6–2
Win	6–5	Aug 2025	M15 Singapore, Singapore	World Tennis Tour	Hard (i)	(Japan) Koki Matsuda	2–6, 7–5, 7–5
Loss	6–6	May 2026	M25 Nakhon Pathom, Thailand	World Tennis Tour	Hard	(South Korea) Chung Hyeon	4–6, 2–6
Loss	6–7	Aug 2026	2026 International Challenger Zhangjiagang, China	Challenger	Hard	Ilia Simakin	3–6, 1–6
