= 2026 International Challenger Zhangjiagang =

- Date: 31 August – 6 September
- Edition: 7th
- Surface: Hard
- Location: Zhangjiagang, China

Champions

Singles
- Ilia Simakin

Doubles
- (South Korea) Nam Ji-sung / (South Korea) Park Ui-sung
- International Challenger Zhangjiagang

The 2026 International Challenger Zhangjiagang was a professional tennis tournament played on hard courts. It was the seventh edition of the tournament which was part of the 2026 ATP Challenger Tour. It took place in Zhangjiagang, China between 31 August and 6 September 2026.

== Singles main-draw entrants ==
=== Seeds ===
| Country | Player | Rank^{1} | Seed |
|---|---|---|---|
| AUS | Bernard Tomic | 179 | 1 |
| SWE | Elias Ymer | 204 | 2 |
| TPE | Tseng Chun-hsin | 220 | 3 |
| CHN | Zhou Yi | 245 | 4 |
| JPN | Hayato Matsuoka | 250 | 5 |
| | Ilia Simakin | 269 | 6 |
| JPN | Kaichi Uchida | 270 | 7 |
| | Petr Bar Biryukov | 286 | 8 |

- ^{1} Rankings are as of 24 August 2026.

=== Other entrants ===
The following players received wildcards into the singles main draw:

- (China) Cui Jie
- (China) Liu Hanyi
- (China) Zhang Tianhui

The following players received entry from the qualifying draw:

- (Australia) Enzo Aguiard
- (Australia) Omar Jasika
- (Malaysia) Mitsuki Wei Kang Leong
- (Japan) Koki Matsuda
- (Japan) Hiroki Moriya
- (Uzbekistan) Khumoyun Sultanov

== Champions ==
=== Singles ===
- Ilia Simakin def. (Thailand) Kasidit Samrej 6–3, 6–1.

=== Doubles ===
- (South Korea) Nam Ji-sung / (South Korea) Park Ui-sung def. (Australia) Joshua Charlton / (China) Wang Aoran 6–3, 4–6, [13–11].
