= Térence Atmane =

French tennis player (born 2002)

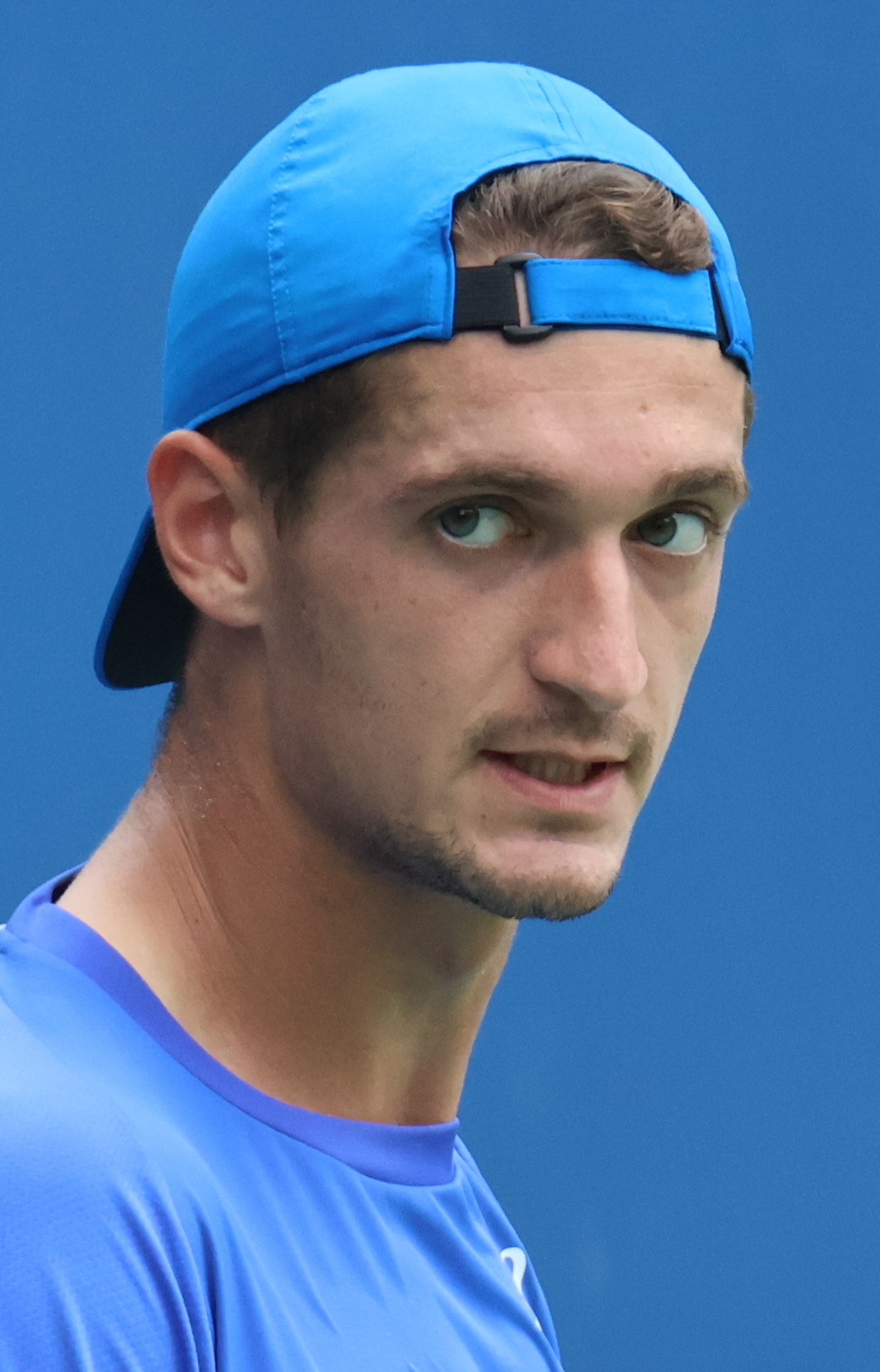
- Atmane at the 2024 Washington Open
- Country (sports): France
- Born: 9 January 2002 (age 24) Saint-Martin-Boulogne, France
- Height: 1.93 m (6 ft 4 in)
- Plays: Left-handed (two-handed backhand)
- Coach: Guillaume Peyre
- Prize money: US $1,867,560

Singles
- Career record: 21–32
- Career titles: 0
- Highest ranking: No. 41 (13 April 2026)
- Current ranking: No. 75 (9 November 2026)

Grand Slam singles results
- Australian Open: 1R (2024, 2026)
- French Open: 1R (2024, 2025, 2026)
- Wimbledon: 1R (2026)
- US Open: 1R (2026)

Doubles
- Career record: 0–1
- Career titles: 0
- Highest ranking: No. 1,946 (20 September 2021)

Grand Slam doubles results
- Australian Open: 1R (2026)
- Wimbledon: 1R (2026)
- Last updated on: 28 September 2026.

Térence Atmane (born 9 January 2002) is a French professional tennis player. He has a career-high ATP singles ranking of world No. 41 achieved on 13 April 2026.

== Professional career ==
=== 2022: Maiden ITF titles ===
In the first half of 2022, Atmane played multiple ITF tournaments in Monastir, Tunisia, reaching the finals five times, with two titles and three runner-ups.

=== 2023: Challenger title, ATP and top 150 debuts ===
In May, Atmane played his first Grand Slam qualifying match at the French Open, losing in the first round to Zdeněk Kolář. In August, Atmane made his US Open qualifying debut and recorded his first Grand Slam qualifying win, defeating Máté Valkusz in the first round, before losing to James Duckworth in the second round, having failed to convert three match points.

In September, Atmane won his first Challenger title in Zhangjiagang, defeating qualifier Mikalai Haliak in the final. Two weeks later, Atmane won his second Challenger title in Guangzhou, defeating top seed Christopher O'Connell in the quarterfinals and second seed Marc Polmans in the final. Atmane broke into the top 150 as a result.

Atmane made his ATP Tour debut at the 2023 Zhuhai Championships, losing to eighth seed and eventual finalist Yoshihito Nishioka in the first round despite winning the first set 6–0. In October, Atmane made his debut at the ATP Masters 1000 level as a qualifier at the Rolex Shanghai Masters. He won his first match on the ATP Tour by defeating Jordan Thompson in the first round before losing to 22nd seed Nicolás Jarry in the second round. In November, he qualified for his third ATP tournament at the 2023 Sofia Open, where he lost in the first round to eight seed Márton Fucsovics.

=== 2024: Major debut, Masters third round ===
Atmane made his Major debut at the 2024 Australian Open as a qualifier. In the first round of the main draw, he won the first set against world No. 3 Daniil Medvedev, but ultimately retired two sets to one down due to cramping.

As the top qualifying seed, he entered the 2024 Dallas Open as a lucky loser but lost to Yoshihito Nishioka. He also qualified for his first ATP 500 tournament, the 2024 Abierto Mexicano Telcel.

In May, Atmane qualified for the main draw of the Italian Open, defeating Thanasi Kokkinakis and Harold Mayot in the qualifying competition. He defeated Christopher Eubanks in the first round for his second career ATP win and also second at a Masters level. He defeated 26th seed Lorenzo Musetti to reach the third round for the first time at a Masters level. As a result he moved into the top 120 in the rankings. He lost in the third round to eight seed Grigor Dimitrov. In May, Atmane received a wildcard to make his 2024 French Open debut. He lost in the first round to Sebastian Ofner in five sets. Atmane received a warning, and was subsequently fined after the match $25,000, for hitting a spectator with a ball during the match.

In July, Atmane reached his third career Challenger final in Granby, Canada, losing to Yunchaokete Bu in the final. In October, for the second straight year, Atmane reached the second round of the Shanghai Open, losing to seventh seed Taylor Fritz in the second round.

=== 2025: Cincinnati semifinal, top 100 debut ===
In April, Atmane won his first Challenger title in more than a year and biggest of his career thus far at the Busan Open in South Korea, defeating top seed Adam Walton in the final. Two weeks later, he won another Challenger title in Guangzhou, defeating defending champion Tristan Schoolkate in the final.

In May, Atmane received a second consecutive main draw wildcard for the 2025 French Open. He lost to Richard Gasquet in the first round. Atmane won his first match of the year on the ATP Tour at the Croatia Open, by defeating Dušan Lajović in the first round. He lost to Pablo Llamas Ruiz in the second round.

In August, Atmane reached the semifinal of a Masters 1000 for the first time at the 2025 Cincinnati Open as a qualifier, defeating Yoshihito Nishioka in the first round, fifteenth seed Flavio Cobolli in the second round, and João Fonseca in the third round. He then defeated fourth seed Taylor Fritz in the fourth round, his first top 10 win. In the quarterfinal, he defeated seventh seed Holger Rune. As a result Atmane made his top 70 debut on 18 August 2025 at world No. 69. He lost to top seed and defending champion Jannik Sinner in the semifinal.

=== 2026: Masters fourth round, top 50 debut ===
In February, Atmane reached his first quarterfinal at an ATP 500 event in Acapulco after defeating Grigor Dimitrov in the first round and Rafael Jódar in the second round. He lost to Miomir Kecmanović in the quarterfinal.

In March, Atmane reached the fourth round at the Miami Open by defeating seventh seed Félix Auger-Aliassime in the third round, his third Top 10 win. As a result he entered the top 50 at world No. 44 on 30 March 2026.

In October, Atmane won his fifth Challenger title at the Seoul Open, defeating Coleman Wong in the final.

== Performance timeline ==
Key
W	F	SF	QF	#R	RR	Q#	DNQ	A	NH

(W) winner; (F) finalist; (SF) semifinalist; (QF) quarterfinalist; (#R) rounds 4, 3, 2, 1; (RR) round-robin stage; (Q#) qualification round; (DNQ) did not qualify; (A) absent; (NH) not held; (SR) strike rate (events won / competed); (W–L) win–loss record.

=== Singles ===
Current through the 2026 Rolex Paris Masters.

Tournament	2023	2024	2025	2026	SR	W–L	Win%
Grand Slam tournaments
Australian Open	A	1R	Q1	1R	0 / 2	0–2	0%
French Open	Q1	1R	1R	1R	0 / 3	0–3	0%
Wimbledon	A	Q1	Q1	1R	0 / 1	0–1	0%
US Open	Q2	Q1	A	1R	0 / 1	0–1	0%
Win–loss	0–0	0–2	0–1	0–4	0 / 7	0–7	0%
ATP 1000 tournaments
Indian Wells Open	A	Q1	Q1	1R	0 / 1	0–1	0%
Miami Open	A	Q2	Q2	4R	0 / 1	3–1	75%
Monte-Carlo Masters	A	A	A	2R	0 / 1	1–1	50%
Madrid Open	A	Q1	A	3R	0 / 1	2–1	67%
Italian Open	A	3R	A	2R	0 / 2	3–2	60%
Canadian Open	A	A	2R	3R	0 / 2	2–2	50%
Cincinnati Open	A	A	SF	3R	0 / 2	7–2	78%
Shanghai Masters	2R	2R	1R	Q1	0 / 3	2–3	40%
Paris Masters	Q1	A	1R	A	0 / 1	0–1	0%
Win–loss	1–1	3–2	5–4	11–7	0 / 14	20–14	59%
Career statistics
	2023	2024	2025	2026	Total		
Tournaments	3	7	9		Career: 19		
Overall win–loss	1–3	3–7	7–9	10–13	0 / 32	21–32	40%
Win %	25%	30%	44%	43%	40%		
Year-end ranking	144	158	63		$1,411,578		

== ATP Challenger finals ==
=== Singles: 6 (5 titles, 1 runner-up) ===
Legend ATP Challenger Tour (5–1)	Finals by surface Hard (5–1) Clay (0–0)

Result	W–L	Date	Tournament	Tier	Surface	Opponent	Score
Win	1–0	Sep 2023	Zhangjiagang Challenger, China	Challenger	Hard	Mikalai Haliak	6–1, 6–2
Win	2–0	Sep 2023	Guangzhou Challenger, China	Challenger	Hard	(Australia) Marc Polmans	4–6, 7–6^{(9–7)}, 6–4
Loss	2–1	Jul 2024	Championnats de Granby, Canada	Challenger	Hard	(China) Bu Yunchaokete	3–6, 7–6^{(9–7)}, 4–6
Win	3–1	Apr 2025	Busan Open, South Korea	Challenger	Hard	(Australia) Adam Walton	6–3, 6–4
Win	4–1	Apr 2025	Guangzhou Challenger, China	Challenger	Hard	(Australia) Tristan Schoolkate	6–3, 7–6^{(7–4)}
Win	5–1	Oct 2026	Seoul Open, South Korea	Challenger	Hard	(Hong Kong) Coleman Wong	7–6^{(7–3)}, 3–6, 7–6^{(11–9)}

== ITF Tour finals ==
=== Singles: 9 (5 titles, 4 runner-ups) ===
Legend ITF Futures/WTT (5–4)	Finals by surface Hard (4–4) Clay (1–0)

Result	W–L	Date	Tournament	Tier	Surface	Opponent	Score
Loss	0–1	Feb 2022	M15 Monastir, Tunisia	WTT	Hard	(Italy) Francesco Passaro	6–7^{(3–7)}, 2–6
Loss	0–2	Mar 2022	M15 Monastir, Tunisia	WTT	Hard	(Monaco) Lucas Catarina	4–6, 1–6
Loss	0–3	Mar 2022	M15 Monastir, Tunisia	WTT	Hard	(Bulgaria) Alexander Donski	2–6, 7–5, 3–6
Win	1–3	Jun 2022	M15 Monastir, Tunisia	WTT	Hard	(France) Cyril Vandermeersch	6–3, 7–6^{(7–4)}
Win	2–3	Jun 2022	M15 Monastir, Tunisia	WTT	Hard	(France) Cyril Vandermeersch	6–2, 6–2
Win	3–3	Oct 2022	M15 Sharm El Sheikh, Egypt	WTT	Hard	(South Africa) Kris van Wyk	6–3, 6–4
Loss	3–4	Nov 2022	M15 Heraklion, Greece	WTT	Hard	(Netherlands) Alec Deckers	4–6, 2–6
Win	4–4	Nov 2022	M25 Heraklion, Greece	WTT	Hard	(Israel) Daniel Cukierman	6–3, 2–6, 6–4
Win	5–4	Mar 2023	M25 Anapoima, Colombia	WTT	Clay	(France) Emilien Voisin	6–3, 6–2

== Wins over top 10 players ==
- Atmane has a 3–5 (37.5%) record against players who were, at the time the match was played, ranked in the top 10.

Season	2025	2026	Total
Wins	2	1	3

#	Player	Rank	Event	Surface	Rd	Score	TAR
2025
1.	(United States) Taylor Fritz	4	Cincinnati Open, United States	Hard	4R	3–6, 7–5, 6–3	136
2.	(Denmark) Holger Rune	9	Cincinnati Open, United States	Hard	QF	6–2, 6–3	136
2026
3.	(Canada) Félix Auger-Aliassime	8	Miami Open, United States	Hard	3R	6–3, 1–6, 6–3	53

*As of 23 March 2026

== Controversy ==
During the 2026 Shanghai Masters, Atmane "...hurled his racket towards the crowd in frustration. Luckily for him, the racket didn’t hit any spectator, and he was spared from a disqualification... he was also seen throwing his towel in anger as he went off the court."
