= Tang Sheng =

Chinese tennis player

- Country (sports): China
- Born: 28 January 2000 (age 26) Nantong, China
- Height: 1.83 m (6 ft 0 in)
- Plays: Right-handed
- Prize money: US $44,146

Singles
- Career record: 0–0 (at ATP Tour level, Grand Slam level, and in Davis Cup)
- Career titles: 0
- Highest ranking: No. 859 (18 November 2024)
- Current ranking: No. 1,352 (19 October 2026)

Doubles
- Career record: 1–1 (at ATP Tour level, Grand Slam level, and in Davis Cup)
- Career titles: 3 ITF
- Highest ranking: No. 345 (16 June 2025)
- Current ranking: No. 1,034 (19 October 2026)
- Last updated on: 19 October 2026.

Tang Sheng (born 28 January 2000) is a Chinese tennis player. He has a career high ATP singles ranking of No. 859 achieved on 18 November 2024 and a career high ATP doubles ranking of No. 345 achieved on 16 June 2025.

Tang made his ATP main draw debut at the 2024 Chengdu Open with a wildcard into the doubles main draw, where he recorded his first ATP-level win.
