= Jason Jung =

American tennis player (born 1989)

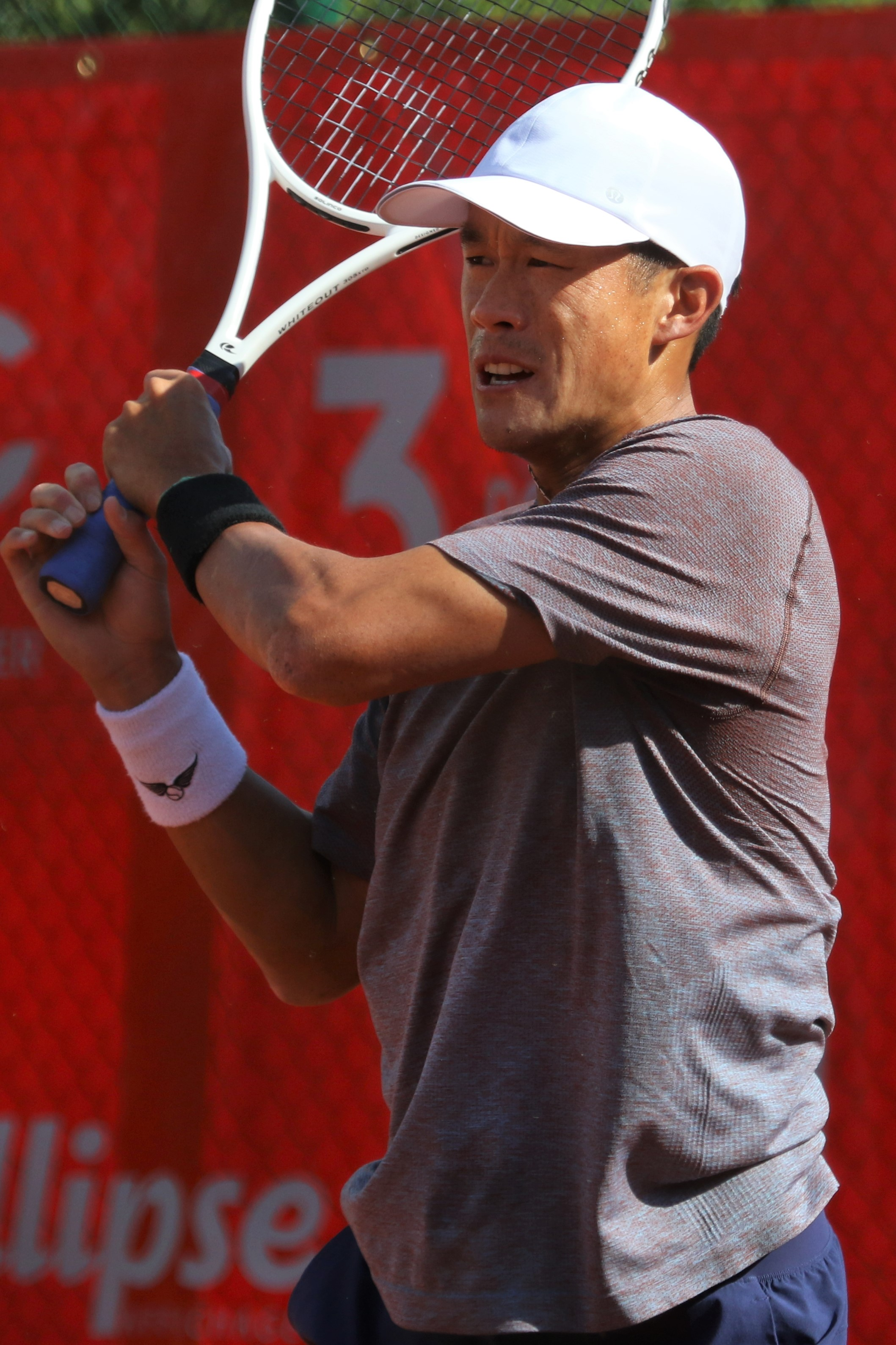
- Jung at the 2022 BNP Paribas Primrose Bordeaux
- Country (sports): United States (2003–2015); Taiwan (2015–present)
- Residence: Torrance, California, U.S.
- Born: 15 June 1989 (age 37) Torrance, California, U.S.
- Height: 1.80 m (5 ft 11 in)
- Turned pro: 2011
- Plays: Right-handed (two-handed backhand)
- College: Michigan
- Coach: Oliver Messerli
- Prize money: US $1,193,753

Singles
- Career record: 12–25
- Career titles: 0
- Highest ranking: No. 114 (30 July 2018)
- Current ranking: No. 893 (3 August 2026)

Grand Slam singles results
- Australian Open: Q2 (2019, 2020)
- French Open: 1R (2020)
- Wimbledon: 1R (2018)
- US Open: 1R (2020)

Doubles
- Career record: 2–3
- Career titles: 0
- Highest ranking: No. 170 (3 August 2026)
- Current ranking: No. 170 (3 August 2026)
Medal record
Men's tennis
Representing Chinese Taipei
Asian Games
Gold medal – first place	2022 Hangzhou	Doubles
Summer Universiade
Gold medal – first place	2017 Taipei	Singles
Gold medal – first place	2017 Taipei	Team
- Last updated on: 3 August 2026.

Jason Jung (born June 15, 1989) is a professional tennis player. He has a career high ATP singles ranking of world No. 114 achieved on 30 July 2018 and a doubles ranking of No. 170 achieved on 3 August 2026. He has won four ATP Challenger titles. Jung has attended the University of Michigan.

== Personal life ==
Jung played college tennis at the University of Michigan, where he majored in political science. As a tennis player, he was the National and Midwest Regional winner of the ITA/Arthur Ashe Award for Leadership & Sportsmanship in 2010. Jung made the All Big Ten team as a junior and senior is the fourth all-time in Michigan history in career doubles wins.

Jung makes blogs about his experiences and his life as a professional tennis player. He was featured in an article by ESPN subsidiary Grantland – together with fellow Michigan alum Evan King as well as then-upcoming players Frances Tiafoe and William Blumberg) – that displayed the struggles and low prize money in playing on the ITF Futures Tour.

== Career ==
Jung reached his first quarterfinal at the 2018 Hall of Fame Tennis Championships in Newport, Rhode Island. He defeated veteran Nicolas Mahut in the second round, but his run was ended by Tim Smyczek, who outlasted Jung 6–1, 5–7, 6–4 in a nearly two-hour, 185-point quarterfinal match.

His career-best result is a semifinal berth at the 2020 New York Open, where he defeated former champion and world No. 5 Kevin Anderson in the first round, followed by seventh seed Cameron Norrie in the second, before upsetting defending champion and third seed Reilly Opelka in the quarterfinals. Jung was eliminated in the semifinals by Italian veteran Andreas Seppi in straight sets.

== ATP Challenger and ITF Tour finals ==
=== Singles: 20 (8–12) ===
Legend (singles) ATP Challenger Tour (4–6) ITF Futures/World Tennis Tour (4–6)	Titles by surface Hard (8–11) Clay (0–1) Grass (0–0) Carpet (0–0)

Result	W–L	Date	Tournament	Tier	Surface	Opponent	Score
Win	1–0	Jul 2012	USA F21, Godfrey	Futures	Hard	(Mexico) César Ramírez	2–6, 7–5, 6–2
Loss	1–1	May 2013	China F4, Fuzhou	Futures	Hard	(China) Bai Yan	3–6, 2–4 ret.
Win	2–1	Aug 2013	USA F22, Edwardsville	Futures	Hard	(Bulgaria) Dimitar Kutrovsky	6–2, 7–6^{(7–5)}
Loss	2–2	Sep 2013	Canada F7, Toronto	Futures	Clay	(Canada) Peter Polansky	1–6, 1–6
Loss	2–3	Mar 2014	USA F9, Calabasas	Futures	Hard	(United States) Marcos Giron	4–6, 6–4, 4–6
Loss	2–4	Nov 2014	Thailand F10, Bangkok	Futures	Hard	(Thailand) Danai Udomchoke	3–6, 4–6
Loss	2–5	Jan 2015	USA F2, Los Angeles	Futures	Hard	(United States) Mitchell Krueger	1–6, 2–6
Win	3–5	Apr 2015	USA F13, Little Rock	Futures	Hard	(Barbados) Darian King	6–3, 4–6, 6–4
Loss	3–6	Apr 2015	Guadalajara, Mexico	Challenger	Hard	(United States) Rajeev Ram	1–6, 2–6
Loss	3–7	Jun 2016	Canada F3, Richmond	Futures	Hard	(Canada) Peter Polansky	1–6, 4–6
Win	4–7	Aug 2016	Chengdu, China, P.R.	Challenger	Hard	(Spain) Rubén Ramírez Hidalgo	6–4, 6–2
Loss	4–8	Sep 2016	Shanghai, China, P.R.	Challenger	Hard	(Switzerland) Henri Laaksonen	3–6, 3–6
Win	5–8	Sep 2017	Zhangjiagang, China, P.R.	Challenger	Hard	(China) Zhang Ze	6–4, 2–6, 6–4
Win	6–8	Feb 2018	San Francisco, USA	Challenger	Hard (i)	(Germany) Dominik Koepfer	6–4, 2–6, 7–6^{(7–5)}
Loss	6–9	Jul 2018	Winnetka, USA	Challenger	Hard	(Russia) Evgeny Karlovskiy	3–6, 2–6
Loss	6–10	Sep 2018	Zhangjiagang, China, P.R.	Challenger	Hard	(Japan) Yasutaka Uchiyama	2–6, 2–6
Win	7–10	May 2019	Gwangju, Korea, Rep.	Challenger	Hard	(Israel) Dudi Sela	6–4, 6–2
Loss	7–11	Aug 2019	Vancouver, Canada	Challenger	Hard	(Lithuania) Ričardas Berankis	3–6, 7–5, 4–6
Win	8–11	Jun 2023	M25 Jakarta, Indonesia	World Tour	Hard	(Czech Republic) Dominik Palán	6–2, 6–2
Loss	8–12	Aug 2023	Zhuhai, China	Challenger	Hard	(France) Arthur Weber	3–6, 7–5, 3–6

=== Doubles: 16 (12–4) ===
Legend (doubles) ATP Challenger Tour (4–3) ITF Futures Tour (8–1)	Titles by surface Hard (9–3) Clay (3–1) Grass (0–0) Carpet (0–0)

Result	W–L	Date	Tournament	Tier	Surface	Partner	Opponents	Score
Win	1–0	Aug 2012	Canada F5, Mississauga	Futures	Hard	(United States) Evan King	(Canada) Kamil Pajkowski (Canada) Milan Pokrajac	6–4, 6–2
Win	2–0	Nov 2012	USA F31, Niceville	Futures	Clay	(United States) Ryan Thacher	(New Zealand) Artem Sitak (Belarus) Andrei Vasilevski	7–5, 6–2
Win	3–0	Dec 2012	Hong Kong F1, Hong Kong	Futures	Hard	(United States) Ryan Thacher	(Russia) Victor Baluda (Russia) Evgeny Karlovskiy	6–1, 6–1
Win	4–0	May 2013	Korea F1, Seoul	Futures	Hard	(United States) Daniel Nguyen	(South Korea) Chung Hong (South Korea) Noh Sang-woo	7–5, 6–1
Win	5–0	Sep 2013	Canada F8, Toronto	Futures	Hard	(United States) Evan King	(Canada) Milan Pokrajac (Canada) Peter Polansky	7–5, 6–2
Win	6–0	Jan 2014	USA F2, Sunrise	Futures	Clay	(United States) Evan King	(United States) William Blumberg (United States) Frances Tiafoe	6–7^{(4–7)}, 6–4, [10–6]
Loss	6–1	Jan 2014	USA F3, Weston	Futures	Clay	(United States) Evan King	(Sweden) Markus Eriksson (Sweden) Milos Sekulic	7–6^{(7–5)}, 6–7^{(4–7)}, [15–17]
Loss	6–2	Jun 2014	Tianjin, China, P.R.	Challenger	Hard	(United States) Evan King	(Germany) Robin Kern (France) Josselin Ouanna	7–6^{(7–3)}, 5–7, [8–10]
Win	7–2	Jan 2016	Maui, USA	Challenger	Hard	(United States) Dennis Novikov	(Australia) Alex Bolt (Germany) Frank Moser	6–3, 4–6, [10–8]
Win	8–2	May 2016	Bangkok, Thailand	Challenger	Hard	(Chinese Taipei) Chen Ti	(South Africa) Dean O'Brien (South Africa) Ruan Roelofse	6–4, 3–6, [10–8]
Win	9–2	Jul 2016	Canada F4, Kelowna	Futures	Hard	(United States) John Paul Fruttero	(Australia) Jarryd Chaplin (New Zealand) Ben McLachlan	6–4, 7–6^{(7–4)}
Loss	9–3	Oct 2021	Las Vegas, USA	Challenger	Hard	(United States) Evan King	(United States) William Blumberg (United States) Max Schnur	5–7, 7–6^{(7–5)}, [5–10]
Loss	9–4	Sep 2025	Shanghai, China	Challenger	Hard	(United States) Reese Stalder	(Thailand) Pruchya Isaro (India) Niki Kaliyanda Poonacha	4–6, 7–6^{(7–2)}, [8–10]
Win	10–4	Mar 2026	M15 Hinode, Japan	World Tennis Tour	Hard	(Japan) Kaito Uesugi	(Japan) Shinji Hazawa (Japan) Masamichi Imamura	5–7, 7–5, [10–7]
Win	11–4	Apr 2026	Wuning, China	Challenger	Hard	(Japan) Kaito Uesugi	(United States) Keegan Smith (China) Zheng Baoluo	6–7^{(3–7)}, 6–3, [10–6]
Win	12–4	Jun 2026	Bad Rappenau, Germany	Challenger	Clay	(Japan) Kaito Uesugi	(Germany) Tim Rühl (Netherlands) Mick Veldheer	7–6^{(7–4)}, 2–6, [12–10]

== Performance timeline ==
Key
W	F	SF	QF	#R	RR	Q#	DNQ	A	NH

(W) winner; (F) finalist; (SF) semifinalist; (QF) quarterfinalist; (#R) rounds 4, 3, 2, 1; (RR) round-robin stage; (Q#) qualification round; (DNQ) did not qualify; (A) absent; (NH) not held; (SR) strike rate (events won / competed); (W–L) win–loss record.
To avoid confusion and double counting, these charts are updated at the conclusion of a tournament or when the player's participation has ended.

=== Singles ===
Tournament	2014	2015	2016	2017	2018	2019	2020	2021	2022	2023	SR	W–L	Win %
Grand Slam tournaments
Australian Open	A	A	A	A	Q1	Q2	Q2	A	Q1	A	0 / 0	0–0	–
French Open	A	Q2	A	Q1	Q1	A	1R	Q1	Q2	A	0 / 1	0–1	0%
Wimbledon	A	Q1	A	Q1	1R	Q1	NH	Q3	Q3		0 / 1	0–1	0%
US Open	A	Q1	A	A	A	Q2	1R	Q2	A		0 / 1	0–1	0%
Win–loss	0–0	0–0	0–0	0–0	0–1	0–0	0–2	0–0	0–0		0 / 3	0–3	0%
ATP Tour Masters 1000
Indian Wells Masters	A	Q1	Q2	A	A	Q1	NH	Q1	A	A	0 / 0	0–0	–
Miami Open	A	A	A	A	A	Q1	NH	Q2	A	A	0 / 0	0–0	–
Monte-Carlo Masters	A	A	A	A	A	A	NH	A	A	A	0 / 0	0–0	–
Madrid Open	A	A	A	A	A	A	NH	A	A	A	0 / 0	0–0	–
Italian Open	A	A	A	A	A	A	A	A	A	A	0 / 0	0–0	–
Canadian Open	Q1	A	A	A	A	A	NH	A	A	A	0 / 0	0–0	–
Cincinnati Masters	A	A	A	A	A	A	A	A	A	A	0 / 0	0–0	–
Shanghai Masters	A	A	A	A	A	A	NH			Q1	0 / 0	0–0	–
Paris Masters	A	A	A	A	A	A	Q1	A	A	A	0 / 0	0–0	–
Win–loss	0–0	0–0	0–0	0–0	0–0	0–0	0–0	0–0	0–0	0–0	0 / 0	0–0	0%
Year-end ranking										800	$1,152,926		
