= Akira Santillan =

Japanese tennis player

Akira Santillan アキラ サンティラン
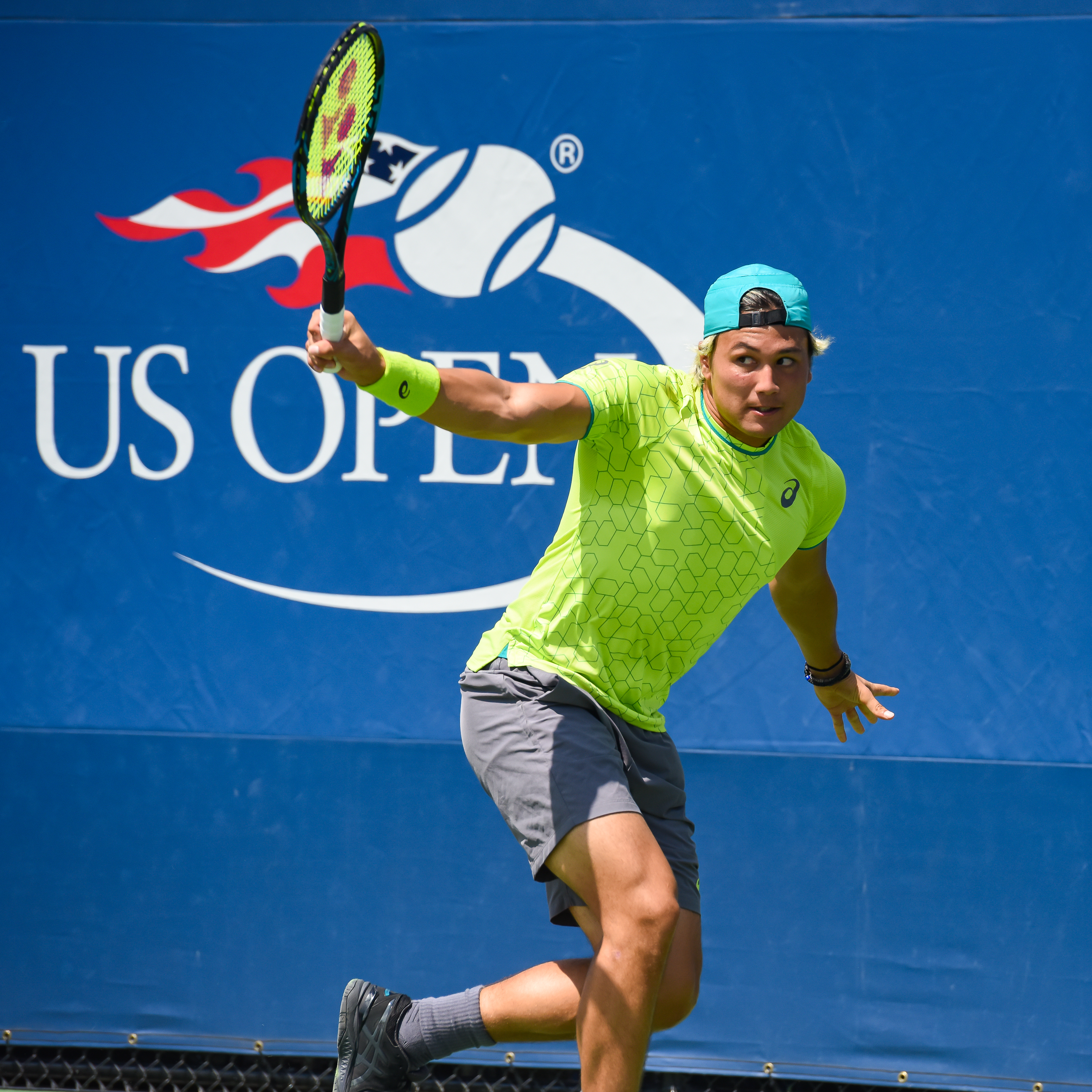
- Santillan at the 2017 US Open
- Country (sports): Australia (2010–2015, 2017–2025); Japan (2015–2017, 2025-present)
- Born: 22 May 1997 (age 29) Tokyo, Japan
- Height: 1.80 m (5 ft 11 in)
- Turned pro: 2013
- Plays: Right-handed (one-handed backhand)
- Coach: Mark Woodforde (2017–2018) Marinko Matosevic (2021–present)
- Prize money: $540,217

Singles
- Career record: 2–7 (at ATP Tour level, Grand Slam level, and in Davis Cup)
- Career titles: 0
- Highest ranking: No. 144 (13 November 2017)
- Current ranking: No. 320 (4 May 2026)

Grand Slam singles results
- Australian Open: Q2 (2017)
- French Open: Q2 (2018)
- Wimbledon: Q2 (2019)
- US Open: Q3 (2017)

Doubles
- Career record: 0–2 (at ATP Tour level, Grand Slam level, and in Davis Cup)
- Career titles: 0
- Highest ranking: No. 197 (29 July 2019)
- Current ranking: No. 310 (12 January 2026)
- Last updated on: 14 January 2026.

Akira Santillan (アキラ サンティラン, Santiran Akira; born 22 May 1997) is a Japanese-Australian tennis player. He represents Japan in competitions, though he played for Australia from 2010 to 2015, and from 2017 to 2025.

== Early life ==
Santillan was born in Tokyo to a Japanese mother and a South African father. He lived the first 8 years of his life in Japan before his family relocated to the Gold Coast, Australia and became citizens. He played much of his junior tennis at the Gold Coast before moving to Brisbane to join the national academy program at the Queensland Tennis Centre.

== Junior career ==
On the junior tour, Santillan has a career-high ITF junior ranking of 7 achieved in September 2015. Santillan's major highlights on the junior tour included a semi-final at the 2015 Australian Open and doubles finals at the 2014 French Open and the 2015 Wimbledon Championships.

In March 2015, Santillan opted to play under the Japanese flag instead due to a fractious relationship with Tennis Australia. He returned to playing under the Australian flag in 2017, before switching back to Japan in 2025.

=== Junior Grand Slam finals ===
==== Doubles ====
Result	Year	Championship	Surface	Partner	Opponent	Score
Loss	2014	French Open	Clay	(Austria) Lucas Miedler	(France) Benjamin Bonzi (France) Quentin Halys	3–6, 3–6
Loss	2015	Wimbledon	Grass	(United States) Reilly Opelka	(Vietnam) Lý Hoàng Nam (India) Sumit Nagal	6–7^{(4–7)}, 4–6

== Professional career ==
Santillan has a career-high ATP singles ranking of 160 achieved on 24 July 2017. He also has a career-high ATP doubles ranking of 265 achieved on 17 July 2017. Santillan has won 6 ITF Futures singles titles and 1 ITF Futures doubles title.

Santillan made his ATP main draw debut at the 2016 Generali Open Kitzbühel, receiving singles and doubles main draw wildcards.

Santillan lost in the first round of the 2022 Australian Open – Men's singles qualifying.

== Challenger and Futures/World Tennis Tour finals ==
=== Singles: 20 (12–8) ===
Legend (singles) ATP Challenger Tour (1–0) ITF Futures/World Tennis Tour (11–8)	Titles by surface Hard (11–6) Clay (1–2) Grass (0–0) Carpet (0–0)

Result	W–L	Date	Tournament	Tier	Surface	Opponent	Score
Win	1–0	Apr 2015	Thailand F1, Bangkok	Futures	Hard	(Japan) Kento Takeuchi	6–3, 6–2
Loss	1–1	May 2015	Thailand F2, Bangkok	Futures	Hard	(United States) Andre Dome	4–6, 7–6^{(9–7)}, 1–6
Win	2–1	Apr 2016	Spain F7, Madrid	Futures	Hard	(Canada) Steven Diez	6–4, 7–6^{(7–5)}
Loss	2–2	Apr 2016	Spain F11, Mostoles	Futures	Hard	(France) Antoine Escoffier	4–6, 7–6^{(7–5)}, 3–6
Win	3–2	May 2016	China F7, Wuhan	Futures	Hard	(South Korea) Chung Yun-seong	6–1, 6–4
Win	4–2	May 2016	China F8, Luan	Futures	Hard	(New Zealand) Finn Tearney	6–3, 1–6, 6–4
Win	5–2	Jun 2016	Spain F18, Palma del Río	Futures	Hard	(France) Rémi Boutillier	7–5, 6–3
Win	6–2	Dec 2016	Spain F39, Cuevas del Almanzora	Futures	Hard	(Spain) Roberto Ortega Olmedo	6–1, 6–1
Win	7–2	Jul 2017	Winnetka, USA	Challenger	Hard	(India) Ramkumar Ramanathan	7–6^{(7–1)}, 6–2
Loss	7–3	Feb 2022	M25 Canberra, Australia	World Tennis Tour	Hard	(Australia) Dane Sweeny	3–6, 6–4, 5–7
Loss	7–4	May 2022	M25 Monastir, Tunisia	World Tennis Tour	Hard	(Japan) Yasutaka Uchiyama	6–7^{(3–7)}, 7–6^{(7–5)}, 3–6
Win	8–4	May 2022	M25 Monastir, Tunisia	World Tennis Tour	Hard	(China) Li Zhe	2–6, 7–6^{(7–3)}, 6–2
Loss	8–5	Jun 2022	M25 Mungia, Spain	World Tennis Tour	Clay	(Spain) Inaki Montes-De La Torre	3–6, 5–7
Loss	8–6	Mar 2023	M25 Portimão, Portugal	World Tennis Tour	Hard	(Portugal) Gonçalo Oliveira	6–7^{(2–7)}, 4–6
Win	9–6	Feb 2025	M15 Antalya, Turkey	World Tennis Tour	Clay	(Serbia) Stefan Popovic	6–1, 6–1
Win	10–6	Jul 2025	M15 Ma'anshan, China	World Tennis Tour	Hard	(Thailand) Kasidit Samrej	3–6, 6–3, 7–6^{(7–5)}
Win	11–6	Aug 2025	M15 Yinchuan, China	World Tennis Tour	Hard	(China) Tianhui Zhang	7–5, 6–3
Win	12–6	Oct 2025	M25 Huzhou, China	World Tennis Tour	Hard	(Australia) Chase Ferguson	6–4, 6–1
Loss	12–7	Feb 2026	M15 Antalya, Turkiye	World Tennis Tour	Clay	(Romania) Filip Cristian Jianu	3–6, 0–2 ret.
Loss	12–8	Apr 2026	M25 Maanshan, China	World Tennis Tour	Hard (i)	(Switzerland) Luca Castelnuovo	Walkover

=== Doubles: 26 (14–12) ===
Legend (doubles) ATP Challenger Tour (6–5) ITF Futures/World Tennis Tour (8–7)	Titles by surface Hard (13–8) Clay (1–4) Grass (0–0) Carpet (0–0)

Result	W–L	Date	Tournament	Tier	Surface	Partner	Opponents	Score
Loss	0–1	Mar 2016	Spain F6, Tarragona	Futures	Clay	(Portugal) Gonçalo Oliveira	(Spain) Marc López (Spain) Jaume Munar	7–6^{(7–4)}, 3–6, [7–10]
Loss	0–2	Apr 2016	Spain F8, Madrid	Futures	Hard	(Spain) Carlos Gómez-Herrera	(Spain) Carlos Boluda-Purkiss (Australia) Alex de Minaur	4–6, 4–6
Win	1–2	May 2016	China F7, Wuhan	Futures	Hard	(Australia) Harry Bourchier	(China) He Yecong (China) Wang Aoxiong	4–6, 6–2, [10–7]
Loss	1–3	Jul 2016	Segovia, Spain	Challenger	Hard (i)	(Spain) Joaquín Muñoz Hernández	(India) Purav Raja (India) Divij Sharan	3–6, 6–4, [8–10]
Loss	1–4	Oct 2016	Ningbo, China, P.R.	Challenger	Hard	(United States) Stefan Kozlov	(France) Jonathan Eysseric (Ukraine) Sergiy Stakhovsky	4–6, 6–7^{(4–7)}
Win	2–4	Dec 2016	Spain F39, Cuevas del Almanzora	Futures	Hard	(Republic of Ireland) Peter Bothwell	(Spain) Roberto Ortega Olmedo (Spain) David Vega Hernández	6–2, 5–7, [10–2]
Win	3–4	May 2018	Savannah, USA	Challenger	Clay	(United Kingdom) Luke Bambridge	(Spain) Enrique López Pérez (India) Jeevan Nedunchezhiyan	6–2, 6–2
Loss	3–5	Sep 2018	Zhangjiagang, China, P.R.	Challenger	Hard	(Australia) Bradley Mousley	(China) Gong Maoxin (China) Zhang Ze	w/o
Win	4–5	Nov 2018	Kobe, Japan	Challenger	Hard (i)	(Portugal) Gonçalo Oliveira	(China) Li Zhe (Japan) Go Soeda	2–6, 6–4, [12–10]
Loss	4–6	Apr 2019	Nanchang, China, P.R.	Challenger	Clay (i)	(Australia) Alex Bolt	(Netherlands) Sander Arends (Austria) Tristan-Samuel Weissborn	2–6, 4–6
Win	5–6	Feb 2022	M25, Canberra, Australia	World Tennis Tour	Hard	(New Zealand) Rubin Statham	(Australia) Calum Puttergill (Japan) Naoki Tajima	6–4, 6–3
Win	6–6	Mar 2022	M25, Bendigo, Australia	World Tennis Tour	Hard	(Australia) Philip Sekulic	(Australia) Dane Sweeny (Australia) Li Tu	7–5, 6–7^{(7–9)}, [10–7]
Loss	6–7	Mar 2022	M25, Medellín, Colombia	World Tennis Tour	Clay	(New Zealand) Rubin Statham	(Zimbabwe) Benjamin Lock (Zimbabwe) Courtney John Lock	6−4, 4−6, [6−10]
Win	7–7	May 2022	M15, Monastir, Tunisia	World Tennis Tour	Hard	(Tunisia) Skander Mansouri	(China) Xin Gao (China) Zhe Li	6–3, 6–0
Win	8–7	May 2022	M25, Monastir, Tunisia	World Tennis Tour	Hard	(Tunisia) Aziz Dougaz	(France) Théo Arribagé (France) Luca Sanchez	7–6^{(7−1)}, 7–6^{(7−3)}
Win	9–7	Jun 2022	M25, Martos, Spain	World Tennis Tour	Hard	(Australia) James Frawley	(Spain) Adrià Soriano Barrera (Spain) Benjamín Winter López	6–7^{(7−9)}, 6–3, [10−6]
Loss	9–8	Jun 2022	M25, The Hague, Netherlands	World Tennis Tour	Clay	(Australia) James Frawley	(Brazil) Orlando Luz (Brazil) Marcelo Zormann	6–7^{(5–7)}, 6–2, [9–11]
Loss	9–9	Jan 2023	Nonthaburi, Thailand	Challenger	Hard	(Indonesia) Christopher Rungkat	(India) Yuki Bhambri (India) Saketh Myneni	6–2, 6–7^{(7–9)}, [12–14]
Loss	9–10	Mar 2023	M25, Portimão, Portugal	World Tennis Tour	Hard	(United Kingdom) Billy Harris	(Portugal) Gonzalo Oliveira (Australia) Jason Taylor	2–6, 2–6
Win	10–10	Oct 2023	Hamburg, Germany	Challenger	Hard (i)	(Austria) Dennis Novak	(Romania) Alexandru Jecan (Netherlands) Mick Veldheer	6–4, 3–6, [10–3]
Loss	10–11	Mar 2025	M25, Shenzhen, China	World Tennis Tour	Hard	(Switzerland) Luca Castelnuovo	(Japan) Taisei Ichikawa (Japan) Kaichi Uchida	4–6, 7–6^{(7–5)}, [7–10]
Win	11–11	Jul 2025	M15, Ma'anshan, China	World Tennis Tour	Hard (i)	(China) Yang Mingyuan	(China) Wang Aoran (China) Zhang Changli	6–2, 6–3
Win	12–11	Aug 2025	Zhangjiagang, China	Challenger	Hard	(Switzerland) Luca Castelnuovo	Petr Bar Biryukov (Italy) Alexandr Binda	6–3, 6–7^{(8–10)}, [10–3]
Loss	12–12	Sep 2025	M15, Ma'anshan, China	World Tennis Tour	Hard (i)	(China) Wang Yukun	(South Korea) Cho Seong-woo (South Korea) Lee Duck-hee	0–6, 4–6
Win	13–12	Oct 2026	Wuning, China	Challenger	Hard	(China) Zheng Baoluo	Yaroslav Demin; Timofei Derepasko	3–6, 6–3, [10–4]
Win	14–12	Oct 2026	Ningbo, China	Challenger	Hard	(China) Zheng Baoluo	(Chinese Taipei) Hsieh Cheng-peng (Japan) Kaichi Uchida	6–3, 7–5
