= Yusuke Takahashi =

Japanese tennis player (born 1997)

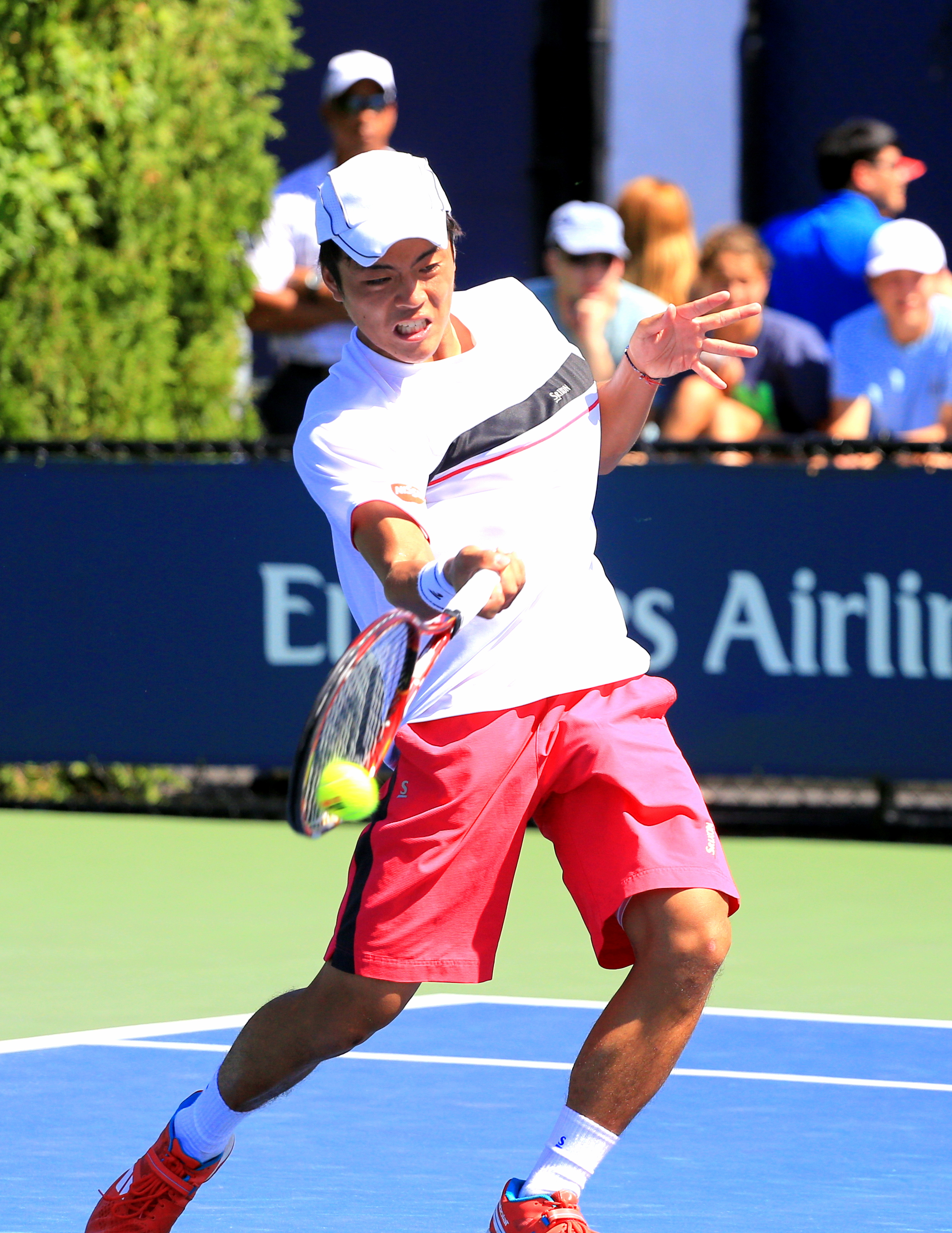
- Takahashi in 2015 US Open
- Country (sports): Japan
- Born: 17 October 1997 (age 29) Yokohama, Japan
- Height: 1.70 m (5 ft 7 in)
- Turned pro: 2016
- Plays: Right-handed (two-handed backhand)
- Coach: Yuma Tsuji
- Prize money: US $222,381

Singles
- Career record: 0–1 (at ATP Tour level, Grand Slam level, and in Davis Cup)
- Career titles: 0
- Highest ranking: No. 238 (7 August 2017)
- Current ranking: No. 795 (9 November 2026)

Doubles
- Career record: 0–0 (at ATP Tour level, Grand Slam level, and in Davis Cup)
- Career titles: 0
- Highest ranking: No. 375 (5 February 2018)
- Current ranking: No. 2,355 (9 November 2026)
- Last updated on: 9 November 2026.

Yusuke Takahashi (高橋 悠介, Takahashi Yūsuke; born 17 October 1997) is a Japanese tennis player. Takahashi has a career high ATP singles ranking of No. 238 achieved on 7 August 2017 and a career high ATP doubles ranking of No. 375 achieved on 5 February 2018.

Takahashi made his ATP main draw debut at the 2017 Rakuten Japan Open Tennis Championships after defeating Adrián Menéndez-Maceiras and Vasek Pospisil in qualifying.

== ATP Challenger and ITF Futures/World Tennis Tour finals ==
=== Singles: 14 (6–8) ===
Legend ATP Challenger Tour (0–0) ITF Futures/World Tennis Tour (6–8)	Finals by surface Hard (6–8) Clay (0–0) Grass (0–0) Carpet (0–0)

Result	W–L	Date	Tournament	Tier	Surface	Opponent	Score
Loss	0–1	May 2016	China F6, Wuhan	Futures	Hard	(Australia) James Duckworth	3–6, 2–6
Win	1–1	Aug 2016	Vietnam F2, Thủ Dầu Một	Futures	Hard	(Indonesia) Christopher Rungkat	6–4, 6–1
Win	2–1	Sep 2016	Thailand F3, Hua Hin	Futures	Hard	(Japan) Renta Tokuda	6–4, 6–0
Loss	2–2	Dec 2016	Indonesia F5, Jakarta	Futures	Hard	(France) Enzo Couacaud	3–6, 2–6
Win	3–2	Mar 2017	Japan F1, Nishitama	Futures	Hard	(Japan) Takuto Niki	7–5, 6–3
Loss	3–3	Mar 2017	Japan F2, Nishitokyo	Futures	Hard	(Australia) Max Purcell	5–7, 6–7^{(8–10)}
Win	4–3	Apr 2017	Japan F4, Tsukuba	Futures	Hard	(Japan) Takuto Niki	6–2, 6–2
Win	5–3	Jun 2017	Japan F6, Karuizawa	Futures	Hard	(Japan) Shintaro Imai	6–2, 6–2
Loss	5–4	Jun 2017	Chinese Taipei F2, Taipei	Futures	Hard	(Japan) Yosuke Watanuki	2–6, 3–6
Loss	5–5	Apr 2018	Japan F5, Kashiwa	Futures	Hard	(China) Li Zhe	4–6, 7–6^{(7–5)}, 5–7
Loss	5–6	Mar 2023	M25 New Delhi, India	World Tour	Hard	(Russia) Evgeny Donskoy	1–6, 3–6
Loss	5–7	Aug 2023	M25 Astana, Kazakhstan	World Tour	Hard	(Japan) Renta Tokuda	0–6, 4–6
Win	6–7	Mar 2025	M15 Kashiwa, Japan	World Tour	Hard	(Japan) Keisuke Saitoh	6–2, 6–0
Loss	6–8	Apr 2025	M15 Osaka, Japan	World Tour	Hard	(Japan) Shintaro Imai	3–6, 3–6
