= International Challenger Zhangjiagang =

- 2025 International Challenger Zhangjiagang

ATP Challenger Tour
- Event name: International Challenger Zhangjiagang
- Location: Zhangjiagang, China
- Venue: Chinese Tennis Academy Zhangjiagang
- Category: ATP Challenger Tour
- Surface: Hard
- Draw: 32S/32Q/16D
- Prize money: $100,000 (2025), $80,000 (2024)

The International Challenger Zhangjiagang is a professional tennis tournament played on hard courts. It is currently part of the ATP Challenger Tour. It is held annually in Zhangjiagang, China since 2017.

== Past finals ==
=== Singles ===
Year	Champion	Runner-up	Score
2026	Ilia Simakin	(Thailand) Kasidit Samrej	6–3, 6–1
2025	(Japan) Sho Shimabukuro	(United Kingdom) Oliver Crawford	6–3, 3–6, 7–5
2024	(Japan) Yasutaka Uchiyama	(Estonia) Mark Lajal	6–7^{(4–7)}, 6–2, 6–2
2023	(France) Térence Atmane	Mikalai Haliak	6–1, 6–2
2020–22	Not held		
2019	(Australia) Marc Polmans	(Italy) Lorenzo Giustino	6–4, 4–6, 7–6^{(7–5)}
2018	(Japan) Yasutaka Uchiyama	(Chinese Taipei) Jason Jung	6–2, 6–2
2017	(Chinese Taipei) Jason Jung	(China) Zhang Ze	6–4, 2–6, 6–4

=== Doubles ===
Year	Champions	Runners-up	Score
2026	(South Korea) Nam Ji-sung (South Korea) Park Ui-sung	(Australia) Joshua Charlton (China) Wang Aoran	6–3, 4–6, [13–11]
2025	(Switzerland) Luca Castelnuovo (Australia) Akira Santillan	Petr Bar Biryukov (Italy) Alexandr Binda	6–3, 6–7^{(8–10)}, [10–3]
2024	(Japan) Kaichi Uchida (Japan) Takeru Yuzuki	(Philippines) Francis Alcantara (Thailand) Pruchya Isaro	6–1, 7–5
2023	(Chinese Taipei) Ray Ho (Australia) Matthew Romios	(Philippines) Francis Alcantara (China) Sun Fajing	6–3, 6–4
2020–22	Not held		
2019	(Australia) Max Purcell (Australia) Luke Saville	(India) Sriram Balaji (Mexico) Hans Hach Verdugo	6–2, 7–6^{(7–5)}
2018	(China) Gong Maoxin (China) Zhang Ze	(Australia) Bradley Mousley (Australia) Akira Santillan	Walkover
2017	(China) Gao Xin (China) Zhang Zhizhen	(Chinese Taipei) Chen Ti (Chinese Taipei) Yi Chu-huan	6–2, 6–3
