= 2015 China International Guangzhou – Doubles =

Doubles
- 2015 China International Guangzhou

Final
- Champions: (Spain) Daniel Muñoz de la Nava (Kazakhstan) Aleksandr Nedovyesov
- Runners-up: (France) Fabrice Martin (India) Purav Raja
- Score: 6–2, 7–5

Events
Singles	Doubles
← 2014 ·	China International Guangzhou	· 2016 →

Sanchai Ratiwatana and Sonchat Ratiwatana were the defending champions, but lost in the quarterfinals.

Daniel Muñoz de la Nava and Aleksandr Nedovyesov won the title, defeating Fabrice Martin and Purav Raja in the final, 6–2, 7–5.

== Seeds ==
1. (United Kingdom) Colin Fleming / (United Kingdom) Jonathan Marray (semifinals)
2. (France) Fabrice Martin / (India) Purav Raja (final)
3. (Germany) Gero Kretschmer / (Germany) Alexander Satschko (first round)
4. (China) Gong Maoxin / (India) Divij Sharan (semifinals)

== Draw ==
=== Key ===
- Q = Qualifier
- WC = Wild card
- LL = Lucky loser
- Alt = Alternate
- SE = Special exempt
- PR = Protected ranking
- ITF = ITF entry
- JE = Junior exempt
- w/o = Walkover
- r = Retired
- d = Defaulted
- SR = Special ranking

First round
1	(United Kingdom) C Fleming (United Kingdom) J Marray	6	6
(France) T Lamasine (New Zealand) M Venus	4	4
(Chinese Taipei) T Chen (Philippines) R Gonzales	4	6	[11]
Alt	(Chinese Taipei) L-c Huang (Japan) Y Sugita	6	4	[13]
3	(Germany) G Kretschmer (Germany) A Satschko	6^{2}	6^{3}
(Netherlands) W Koolhof (Netherlands) M Middelkoop	7^{7}	7^{7}
(Spain) D Muñoz de la Nava (Kazakhstan) A Nedovyesov	6^{4}	6	[10]
(Italy) R Ghedin (Brazil) A Ghem	7^{7}	4	[7]
(Russia) A Kudryavtsev (India) S Singh	3	4
WC	(Chinese Taipei) C-p Hsieh (Chinese Taipei) H-h Lee	6	6
(Spain) R Carballés Baena (Belgium) K Coppejans	5	6^{7}
4	(China) M Gong (India) D Sharan	7	7^{9}
(Japan) H Moriya (China) Z Zhang	6	6^{4}	[6]
(Thailand) Sa Ratiwatana (Thailand) So Ratiwatana	3	7^{7}	[10]
WC	(China) X Gao (China) Z Li	3	6^{3}
2	(France) F Martin (India) P Raja	6	7^{7}

Quarterfinals
1	(United Kingdom) C Fleming (United Kingdom) J Marray	6	6
Alt	(Chinese Taipei) L-c Huang (Japan) Y Sugita	4	2
(Netherlands) W Koolhof (Netherlands) M Middelkoop	1	6	[6]
(Spain) D Muñoz de la Nava (Kazakhstan) A Nedovyesov	6	4	[10]
WC	(Chinese Taipei) C-p Hsieh (Chinese Taipei) H-h Lee	6^{4}	7^{8}	[10]
4	(China) M Gong (India) D Sharan	7^{7}	6^{6}	[12]
(Thailand) Sa Ratiwatana (Thailand) So Ratiwatana	4	6	[8]
2	(France) F Martin (India) P Raja	6	2	[10]

Semifinals
1	(United Kingdom) C Fleming (United Kingdom) J Marray	6^{4}	6	[7]
(Spain) D Muñoz de la Nava (Kazakhstan) A Nedovyesov	7^{7}	2	[10]
4	(China) M Gong (India) D Sharan	5	6	[6]
2	(France) F Martin (India) P Raja	7	3	[10]

Final
(Spain) D Muñoz de la Nava (Kazakhstan) A Nedovyesov	6	7
2	(France) F Martin (India) P Raja	2	5
