= 2024 Guangzhou International Challenger – Doubles =

Doubles
- 2024 Guangzhou International Challenger

Final
- Champions: (Australia) Blake Ellis (Australia) Tristan Schoolkate
- Runners-up: (South Korea) Nam Ji-sung (Finland) Patrik Niklas-Salminen
- Score: 6–2, 6–7^{(4–7)}, [10–4]

Events
Singles	Doubles
← 2023 ·	Guangzhou International Challenger	· 2025 →

Antoine Bellier and Luca Castelnuovo were the defending champions but chose not to defend their title.

Blake Ellis and Tristan Schoolkate won the title after defeating Nam Ji-sung and Patrik Niklas-Salminen 6–2, 6–7^{(4–7)}, [10–4] in the final.

== Seeds ==
1. (Australia) Calum Puttergill / (United States) Reese Stalder (semifinals)
2. (Poland) Piotr Matuszewski / (Australia) Matthew Romios (quarterfinals)
3. (South Korea) Nam Ji-sung / (Finland) Patrik Niklas-Salminen (final)
4. (Japan) Toshihide Matsui / (Japan) Kaito Uesugi (first round)

== Draw ==
Key

- Q = Qualifier
- WC = Wild card
- LL = Lucky loser
- Alt = Alternate
- ITF = ITF entry
- PR = Protected ranking
- SR = Special ranking
- SE = Special exempt
- JE = Junior exempt
- JR = Junior Accelerator Programme entrant
- CO = College Accelerator Programme entrant
- NG = Next Gen Accelerator Program entrant
- w/o = Walkover
- r = Retired
- d = Defaulted

=== Draw ===
First round
1	(Australia) C Puttergill (United States) R Stalder	6	6
(Australia) B Bayldon (Japan) Y Shimizu	4	4
(Italy) M Bellucci (Tunisia) M Echargui	3	2
(Chinese Taipei) R Ho (India) R Ramanathan	6	6
3	(South Korea) J-s Nam (Finland) P Niklas-Salminen	6	3	[10]
(Philippines) FC Alcantara (China) F Sun	3	6	[8]
(Australia) L Saville (Australia) L Tu	6	7
(Australia) O Jasika (Australia) A Santillan	3	5
(Australia) B Ellis (Australia) T Schoolkate	6	4	[10]
A Kachmazov (Kazakhstan) B Zhukayev	4	6	[7]
WC	(China) J Cui (China) R Te	7^{7}	7^{7}
4	(Japan) T Matsui (Japan) K Uesugi	6^{3}	6^{4}
(New Zealand) R Statham (Australia) A Walton	6^{2}	3
Alt	(Switzerland) R Bertola (France) A Escoffier	7^{7}	6
WC	(China) Wang Jiaji (China) Yang Zijiang	5	6^{5}
2	(Poland) P Matuszewski (Australia) MC Romios	6	7^{7}

Quarterfinals
1	(Australia) C Puttergill (United States) R Stalder	6	6
(Chinese Taipei) R Ho (India) R Ramanathan	4	3
3	(South Korea) J-s Nam (Finland) P Niklas-Salminen	6^{2}	7^{7}	[10]
(Australia) L Saville (Australia) L Tu	7^{7}	6^{4}	[4]
(Australia) B Ellis (Australia) T Schoolkate	6	6
WC	(China) J Cui (China) R Te	2	3
Alt	(Switzerland) R Bertola (France) A Escoffier	6^{5}	7	[10]
2	(Poland) P Matuszewski (Australia) MC Romios	7^{7}	5	[3]

Semifinals
1	(Australia) C Puttergill (United States) R Stalder	2	6	[7]
3	(South Korea) J-s Nam (Finland) P Niklas-Salminen	6	3	[10]
(Australia) B Ellis (Australia) T Schoolkate	w/o
Alt	(Switzerland) R Bertola (France) A Escoffier

Final
3	(South Korea) J-s Nam (Finland) P Niklas-Salminen	2	7^{7}	[4]
(Australia) B Ellis (Australia) T Schoolkate	6	6^{4}	[10]
