= 2025 Guangzhou International Challenger – Singles =

Singles
- 2025 Guangzhou International Challenger

Final
- Champion: (France) Térence Atmane
- Runner-up: (Australia) Tristan Schoolkate
- Score: 6–3, 7–6^{(7–4)}

Events
| Singles | Doubles |
| ← 2024 · | Guangzhou International Challenger | · 2026 → |

Tristan Schoolkate was the defending champion but lost in the final to Térence Atmane.

Atmane won the title after defeating Schoolkate 6–3, 7–6^{(7–4)} in the final.

== Seeds ==
1. (Australia) Adam Walton (second round)
2. (United States) Brandon Holt (semifinals)
3. (Australia) Tristan Schoolkate (final)
4. (France) Térence Atmane (champion)
5. (Australia) Li Tu (first round)
6. (France) Hugo Grenier (quarterfinals)
7. (Australia) James McCabe (quarterfinals)
8. (France) Constant Lestienne (first round)

== Draw ==
=== Key ===
- Q = Qualifier
- WC = Wild card
- LL = Lucky loser
- Alt = Alternate
- ITF = ITF entry
- PR = Protected ranking
- SR = Special ranking
- SE = Special exempt
- JE = Junior exempt
- JR = Junior Accelerator Programme entrant
- CO = College Accelerator Programme entrant
- NG = Next Gen Accelerator Program entrant
- w/o = Walkover
- r = Retired
- d = Defaulted

=== Finals ===
Semifinals
Alibek Kachmazov | 3 | 7^{7} | 4
3 | (Australia) Tristan Schoolkate | 6 | 6^{4} | 6
4 | (France) Térence Atmane | 6 | 6
2 | (United States) Brandon Holt | 4 | 3

Final
3 | (Australia) Tristan Schoolkate | 3 | 6^{4}
4 | (France) Térence Atmane | 6 | 7^{7}

=== Top half ===
First round
1 | (Australia) A Walton | 6 | 7^{7}
Q | (United States) Andre Ilagan | 3 | 6^{3}
Alt | (China) F Sun | 4 | 6^{5}
A Kachmazov | 6 | 7^{7}
(Australia) O Jasika | 6 | 7^{7}
Q | (United States) Christian Langmo | 4 | 6^{5}
LL | (Thailand) K Samrej | 3 | 7^{7} | 3
7 | (Australia) J McCabe | 6 | 6^{3} | 6
3 | (Australia) T Schoolkate | 6 | 4 | 6
Q | (United Kingdom) R Peniston | 4 | 6 | 4
(Australia) A Bolt | 6 | 4 | 1
(Japan) S Shimabukuro | 3 | 6 | 6
Q | (Australia) M Bouzige | 6 | 6
JR | (South Korea) Roh Ho-young | 3 | 1
WC | (China) Charles Chen | 2 | 4
6 | (France) H Grenier | 6 | 6

Second round
1 | (Australia) A Walton | 6 | 6^{2} | 2
A Kachmazov | 4 | 7^{7} | 6
(Australia) O Jasika | 4 | 6 | 2
7 | (Australia) J McCabe | 6 | 1 | 6
3 | (Australia) T Schoolkate | 6 | 0
(Japan) S Shimabukuro | 2 | 0^{r}
Q | (Australia) M Bouzige | 4 | 5
6 | (France) H Grenier | 6 | 7

Quarterfinals
A Kachmazov | 7^{7} | 6
7 | (Australia) J McCabe | 6^{5} | 4
3 | (Australia) T Schoolkate | 6 | 6
6 | (France) H Grenier | 4 | 4

Semifinals
A Kachmazov | 3 | 7^{7} | 4
3 | (Australia) T Schoolkate | 6 | 6^{4} | 6

=== Bottom half ===
First round
5 | (Australia) L Tu | 4 | 7^{10} | 3
(Japan) Y Watanuki | 6 | 6^{8} | 6
Q | (China) Y Mo | 1 | 6^{3}
Alt | I Simakin | 6 | 7^{7}
Q | (Germany) M Rosenkranz | 3 | 6 | 4
M Sharipov | 6 | 3 | 6
WC | (China) R Te | 7 | 3 | 1
4 | (France) T Atmane | 5 | 6 | 6
8 | (France) C Lestienne | 5 | 4
(Chinese Taipei) Y-h Hsu | 7 | 6
(France) A Escoffier | 6 | 6
(United States) Z Svajda | 4 | 4
WC | (China) Y Zhou | 4 | 4
Alt | (China) J Cui | 6 | 6
(Japan) R Noguchi | 6^{3} | 6^{2}
2 | (United States) B Holt | 7^{7} | 7^{7}

Second round
(Japan) Y Watanuki | 4 | 6^{6}
Alt | I Simakin | 6 | 7^{8}
M Sharipov | 5 | 6^{3}
4 | (France) T Atmane | 7 | 7^{7}
(Chinese Taipei) Y-h Hsu | 6 | 3 | 6
(France) A Escoffier | 3 | 6 | 2
Alt | (China) J Cui | 6^{7} | 6^{4}
2 | (United States) B Holt | 7^{9} | 7^{7}

Quarterfinals
Alt | I Simakin | 6 | 6^{4} | 5
4 | (France) T Atmane | 1 | 7^{7} | 7
(Chinese Taipei) Y-h Hsu | 4 | 3
2 | (United States) B Holt | 6 | 6

Semifinals
4 | (France) T Atmane | 6 | 6
2 | (United States) B Holt | 4 | 3
