= 2015 China International Guangzhou – Singles =

Singles
- 2015 China International Guangzhou

Final
- Champion: (Belgium) Kimmer Coppejans
- Runner-up: (Italy) Roberto Marcora
- Score: 7–6^{(8–6)}, 5–7, 6–1

Events
Singles	Doubles
← 2014 ·	China International Guangzhou	· 2016 →

Blaž Rola was the defending champion, but did not participate.

Kimmer Coppejans won the title, defeating Roberto Marcora in the final, 7–6^{(8–6)}, 5–7, 6–1.

== Seeds ==
1. (Slovenia) Blaž Kavčič (first round)
2. (South Korea) Chung Hyeon (semifinals)
3. (Kazakhstan) Aleksandr Nedovyesov (first round)
4. (Russia) Alexander Kudryavtsev (first round, retired)
5. (Australia) John Millman (first round)
6. (Japan) Yūichi Sugita (second round)
7. (Japan) Hiroki Moriya (second round)
8. (Spain) Roberto Carballés Baena (quarterfinals)

== Draw ==
=== Key ===
- Q = Qualifier
- WC = Wild card
- LL = Lucky loser
- Alt = Alternate
- SE = Special exempt
- PR = Protected ranking
- ITF = ITF entry
- JE = Junior exempt
- w/o = Walkover
- r = Retired
- d = Defaulted
- SR = Special ranking

=== Finals ===
Semifinals
(Italy) Roberto Marcora	7^{7}	6^{9}	6
(Hungary) Márton Fucsovics	6^{3}	7^{11}	4
(Belgium) Kimmer Coppejans	6	2	6
2	(South Korea) Chung Hyeon	4	6	2

Final
(Italy) Roberto Marcora	6^{6}	7	1
(Belgium) Kimmer Coppejans	7^{8}	5	6

=== Top half ===
First round
1	(Slovenia) B Kavčič	1	3
(China) Z Zhang	6	6
(Belarus) U Ignatik	2	6	6^{6}
Q	(Germany) R Becker	6	3	7^{8}
WC	(China) Zheng Weiqiang	0	2
(Australia) J Thompson	6	6
(Italy) R Marcora	6	1	6
5	(Australia) J Millman	2	6	2
3	(Kazakhstan) A Nedovyesov	2	6^{6}
(India) S Devvarman	6	7^{8}
(Chinese Taipei) T Chen	3	4
(Hungary) M Fucsovics	6	6
WC	(China) D Wu	7^{7}	2	2
(Bosnia and Herzegovina) A Šetkić	6^{5}	6	6
Q	(Netherlands) M Middelkoop	7	6^{6}	0
7	(Japan) H Moriya	5	7^{8}	6

Second round
(China) Z Zhang	6	6
Q	(Germany) R Becker	2	3
(Australia) J Thompson	4	6^{3}
(Italy) R Marcora	6	7^{7}
(India) S Devvarman	2	7^{7}	1
(Hungary) M Fucsovics	6	6^{5}	6
(Bosnia and Herzegovina) A Šetkić	6	6
7	(Japan) H Moriya	3	1

Quarterfinals
(China) Z Zhang	3	6	1
(Italy) R Marcora	6	1	6
(Hungary) M Fucsovics	6	3	6
(Bosnia and Herzegovina) A Šetkić	2	6	4

Semifinals
(Italy) R Marcora	7^{7}	6^{9}	6
(Hungary) M Fucsovics	6^{3}	7^{11}	4

=== Bottom half ===
First round
6	(Japan) Y Sugita	6	7^{7}
WC	(China) Z Li	4	6^{4}
(Belgium) K Coppejans	6	7^{7}
(Australia) B Mitchell	2	6^{2}
Q	(Italy) R Ghedin	2	3
(France) T Lamasine	6	6
(Brazil) A Ghem	6	0
4	(Russia) A Kudryavtsev	4	0^{r}
8	(Spain) R Carballés Baena	6	2	6
(United Kingdom) D Cox	3	6	4
WC	(China) C Wang	6	6
Q	(Japan) Yu Watanuki	0	1
(Germany) P Torebko	4	4
(Spain) D Muñoz de la Nava	6	6
(India) S Myneni	7	4	4
2	(South Korea) H Chung	5	6	6

Second round
6	(Japan) Y Sugita	6	3	6^{5}
(Belgium) K Coppejans	4	6	7^{7}
(France) T Lamasine	6	6
(Brazil) A Ghem	3	4
8	(Spain) R Carballés Baena	6	7
WC	(China) C Wang	3	5
(Spain) D Muñoz de la Nava	2	6^{1}
2	(South Korea) H Chung	6	7^{7}

Quarterfinals
(Belgium) K Coppejans	2	6	6
(France) T Lamasine	6	3	2
8	(Spain) R Carballés Baena	0	6^{4}
2	(South Korea) H Chung	6	7^{7}

Semifinals
(Belgium) K Coppejans	6	2	6
2	(South Korea) H Chung	4	6	2
