= 2024 Guangzhou International Challenger – Singles =

Singles
- 2024 Guangzhou International Challenger

Final
- Champion: (Australia) Tristan Schoolkate
- Runner-up: (Australia) Adam Walton
- Score: 6–3, 3–6, 6–3

Events
Singles	Doubles
← 2023 ·	Guangzhou International Challenger	· 2025 →

Térence Atmane was the defending champion but chose not to defend his title.

Tristan Schoolkate won the title after defeating Adam Walton 6–3, 3–6, 6–3 in the final.

== Seeds ==
1. (Australia) Max Purcell (first round)
2. (Australia) James Duckworth (quarterfinals)
3. (Australia) Adam Walton (final)
4. (South Africa) Lloyd Harris (withdrew)
5. (China) Bu Yunchaokete (semifinals)
6. (Japan) Yasutaka Uchiyama (first round)
7. (United States) Maxime Cressy (semifinals)
8. (Italy) Mattia Bellucci (second round)

== Draw ==
=== Key ===
- Q = Qualifier
- WC = Wild card
- LL = Lucky loser
- Alt = Alternate
- SE = Special exempt
- PR = Protected ranking
- ITF = ITF entry
- JE = Junior exempt
- w/o = Walkover
- r = Retired
- d = Defaulted
- SR = Special ranking

=== Finals ===
Semifinals
(Australia) Tristan Schoolkate	7^{7}	6
7	(United States) Maxime Cressy	6^{4}	3
3	(Australia) Adam Walton	2	7^{7}	6
5	(China) Bu Yunchaokete	6	6^{5}	2

Final
(Australia) Tristan Schoolkate	6	3	6
3	(Australia) Adam Walton	3	6	3

=== Top half ===
First round
1	(Australia) M Purcell	3	3
Alt	(United States) B Holt	6	6
(Chinese Taipei) Y-h Hsu	6	6
Q	(China) Y Bai	2	3
(Australia) T Schoolkate	6	3
(Kazakhstan) D Yevseyev	2	0^{r}
(Australia) L Tu	1	4
8	(Italy) M Bellucci	6	6
LL	(Japan) Y Shimizu	6	6
(Hong Kong) C Wong	3	2
WC	(China) Wang Jiaji	3	1
(Australia) O Jasika	6	6
(Estonia) M Lajal	4	6	6
Q	(China) J Cui	6	1	4
Q	(Japan) H Moriya	3	3
7	(United States) M Cressy	6	6

Second round
Alt	(United States) B Holt	3	1
(Chinese Taipei) Y-h Hsu	6	6
(Australia) T Schoolkate	6	7^{7}
8	(Italy) M Bellucci	0	6^{5}
LL	(Japan) Y Shimizu	7	7
(Australia) O Jasika	5	5
(Estonia) M Lajal	3	6	3
7	(United States) M Cressy	6	3	6

Quarterfinals
(Chinese Taipei) Y-h Hsu	6	4	5
(Australia) T Schoolkate	3	6	7
LL	(Japan) Y Shimizu	4	6	6^{3}
7	(United States) M Cressy	6	4	7^{7}

Semifinals
(Australia) T Schoolkate	7^{7}	6
7	(United States) M Cressy	6^{4}	3

=== Bottom half ===
First round
6	(Japan) Y Uchiyama	4	4
WC	(China) R Te	6	6
Q	E Gerasimov	1	4
(Kazakhstan) B Zhukayev	6	6
(Ukraine) I Marchenko	4	6	1
(Australia) A Bolt	6	4	6
WC	(China) Y Zhou	6	5	3
3	(Australia) A Walton	4	7	6
5	(China) Y Bu	6	6
(Italy) F Cinà	1	4
(France) A Escoffier	6	6
Q	(Japan) R Noguchi	1	3
A Kachmazov	2	3
Q	(Lithuania) R Berankis	6	6
(Australia) D Sweeny	6	3	2
2	(Australia) J Duckworth	0	6	6

Second round
WC	(China) R Te	5	6^{3}
(Kazakhstan) B Zhukayev	7	7^{7}
(Australia) A Bolt	6^{0}	1
3	(Australia) A Walton	7^{7}	6
5	(China) Y Bu	6	6
(France) A Escoffier	4	4
Q	(Lithuania) R Berankis	1	1
2	(Australia) J Duckworth	6	6

Quarterfinals
(Kazakhstan) B Zhukayev	3	7	5
3	(Australia) A Walton	6	5	7
5	(China) Y Bu	7^{7}	6
2	(Australia) J Duckworth	6^{4}	3

Semifinals
3	(Australia) A Walton	2	7^{7}	6
5	(China) Y Bu	6	6^{5}	2
