= 2016 "GDD CUP" International Challenger Guangzhou =

Professional tennis tournament

- Date: 14–21 March
- Edition: 5th
- Draw: 32S / 16D
- Prize money: $50,000+H
- Surface: Hard
- Location: Guangzhou, China

Champions

Singles
- (Georgia (country)) Nikoloz Basilashvili

Doubles
- (Russia) Alexander Kudryavtsev / (Ukraine) Denys Molchanov
← 2015 ·	"GDD CUP" International Challenger Guangzhou	· 2023 →

The 2016 "GDD CUP" International Challenger Guangzhou was a professional tennis tournament played on hard courts. It was the 5th edition of the tournament which was part of the 2016 ATP Challenger Tour. It took place in Guangzhou, China between 14 and 21 March 2016.

== Singles main-draw entrants ==
=== Seeds ===
Country	Player	Rank^{1}	Seed
JPN	Taro Daniel	86	1
ISR	Dudi Sela	88	2
ESP	Daniel Gimeno Traver	91	3
SER	Filip Krajinović	97	4
SVK	Lukáš Lacko	106	5
IND	Yuki Bhambri	111	6
GEO	Nikoloz Basilashvili	117	7
BEL	Kimmer Coppejans	122	8

- ^{1} Rankings are as of March 7, 2016

=== Other entrants ===
The following players received wildcards into the singles main draw:

- (Turkey) Altuğ Çelikbilek
- (China) Wang Chuhan
- (China) Bai Yan
- (China) Li Zhe

The following player received entry into the singles main draw as a special exempt:

- (China) Zhang Ze

The following players received entry from the qualifying draw:

- (Italy) Lorenzo Sonego
- (Austria) Maximilian Neuchrist
- (Romania) Marius Copil
- (Chinese Taipei) Jimmy Wang

== Champions ==
=== Singles ===
- (Georgia (country)) Nikoloz Basilashvili def. (Slovakia) Lukáš Lacko, 6–1, 6–7^{(6–8)}, 7–5

=== Doubles ===
- (Russia) Alexander Kudryavtsev / (Ukraine) Denys Molchanov def. (Thailand) Sanchai Ratiwatana / (Thailand) Sonchat Ratiwatana, 6–2, 6–2
