= 2016 "GDD CUP" International Challenger Guangzhou – Singles =

Singles
- 2016 "GDD CUP" International Challenger Guangzhou

Final
- Champion: (Georgia (country)) Nikoloz Basilashvili
- Runner-up: (Slovakia) Lukáš Lacko
- Score: 6–1, 6–7^{(6–8)}, 7–5

Events
Singles	Doubles
← 2015 ·	"GDD CUP" International Challenger Guangzhou	· 2023 →

Kimmer Coppejans was the defending champion but lost to Go Soeda in the second round.

Nikoloz Basilashvili won the title after defeating Lukáš Lacko 6–1, 6–7^{(6–8)}, 7–5 in the final.

== Seeds ==
1. (Japan) Taro Daniel (first round)
2. (Israel) Dudi Sela (semifinals, retired)
3. (Spain) Daniel Gimeno Traver (first round)
4. (Serbia) Filip Krajinović (first round)
5. (Slovakia) Lukáš Lacko (final)
6. (India) Yuki Bhambri (second round, retired)
7. (Georgia (country)) Nikoloz Basilashvili (champion)
8. (Belgium) Kimmer Coppejans (second round)

== Draw ==
=== Key ===
- Q = Qualifier
- WC = Wild card
- LL = Lucky loser
- Alt = Alternate
- SE = Special exempt
- PR = Protected ranking
- ITF = ITF entry
- JE = Junior exempt
- w/o = Walkover
- r = Retired
- d = Defaulted
- SR = Special ranking

=== Finals ===
Semifinals
SE	(China) Zhang Ze	0	1
5	(Slovakia) Lukáš Lacko	6	6
7	(Georgia (country)) Nikoloz Basilashvili	6^{5}	6	2
2	(Israel) Dudi Sela	7^{7}	4	0^{r}

Final
5	(Slovakia) Lukáš Lacko	1	7^{8}	5
7	(Georgia (country)) Nikoloz Basilashvili	6	6^{6}	7

=== Top half ===
First round
1	(Japan) T Daniel	6	0	5
(India) S Myneni	1	6	7
SE	(China) Z Zhang	7	6
(Australia) L Saville	5	3
WC	(China) Z Li	6	6^{5}	6
(Russia) A Kudryavtsev	1	7^{7}	1
Q	(Italy) L Sonego	1	1
6	(India) Y Bhambri	6	6
3	(Spain) D Gimeno Traver	3	3
(Czech Republic) A Pavlásek	6	6
(Germany) P Gojowczyk	6	3	3
(Turkey) M İlhan	1	6	6
WC	(Turkey) A Çelikbilek	2	2
(Germany) N Langer	6	6
Q	(Austria) M Neuchrist	2	2
5	(Slovakia) L Lacko	6	6

Second round
(India) S Myneni	6	6^{5}	2
SE	(China) Z Zhang	4	7^{7}	6
WC	(China) Z Li	4
6	(India) Y Bhambri	1^{r}
(Czech Republic) A Pavlásek	6	6^{7}	2
(Turkey) M İlhan	3	7^{9}	6
(Germany) N Langer	3	4
5	(Slovakia) L Lacko	6	6

Quarterfinals
SE	(China) Z Zhang	6	6
WC	(China) Z Li	2	4
(Turkey) M İlhan	6	3	4
5	(Slovakia) L Lacko	4	6	6

Semifinals
SE	(China) Z Zhang	0	1
5	(Slovakia) L Lacko	6	6

=== Bottom half ===
First round
7	(Georgia (country)) N Basilashvili	5	7	6
(Slovenia) B Rola	7	5	4
Q	(Romania) M Copil	0	2
(Switzerland) M Chiudinelli	6	6
(Croatia) F Škugor	6	1
WC	(China) Y Bai	3	0^{r}
(Italy) T Fabbiano	7^{7}	6
4	(Serbia) F Krajinović	6^{2}	4
8	(Belgium) K Coppejans	6	6
Q	(Chinese Taipei) J Wang	2	2
WC	(China) C Wang	3	3
(Japan) G Soeda	6	6
(China) D Wu	6	6
(Australia) J Thompson	3	2
(Japan) H Moriya	4	6	5
2	(Israel) D Sela	6	1	7

Second round
7	(Georgia (country)) N Basilashvili	7	6
(Switzerland) M Chiudinelli	5	0
(Croatia) F Škugor	6	6
(Italy) T Fabbiano	4	3
8	(Belgium) K Coppejans	3	1
(Japan) G Soeda	6	6
(China) D Wu	2	0
2	(Israel) D Sela	6	6

Quarterfinals
7	(Georgia (country)) N Basilashvili	6^{7}	6	6
(Croatia) F Škugor	7^{9}	4	2
(Japan) G Soeda	6	2	3
2	(Israel) D Sela	4	6	6

Semifinals
7	(Georgia (country)) N Basilashvili	6^{5}	6	2
2	(Israel) D Sela	7^{7}	4	0^{r}
