= 2026 Guangzhou International Challenger – Singles =

Singles
- 2026 Guangzhou International Challenger

Final
- Champion: (Australia) Tristan Schoolkate
- Runner-up: (Hong Kong) Coleman Wong
- Score: 4–6, 7–6^{(7–3)}, 6–4

Events
Singles	Doubles
- Guangzhou International Challenger

Térence Atmane was the defending champion but chose not to defend his title.

Tristan Schoolkate won the title after defeating Coleman Wong 4–6, 7–6^{(7–3)}, 6–4 in the final.

== Seeds ==
1. (Hong Kong) Coleman Wong (final)
2. (China) Wu Yibing (second round)
3. (Australia) Tristan Schoolkate (champion)
4. (China) Zhang Zhizhen (second round)
5. (Sweden) Elias Ymer (first round)
6. (United States) Andre Ilagan (quarterfinals)
7. (United States) Keegan Smith (quarterfinals)
8. (United Kingdom) Liam Broady (second round)

== Draw ==
Key

- Q = Qualifier
- WC = Wild card
- LL = Lucky loser
- Alt = Alternate
- ITF = ITF entry
- PR = Protected ranking
- SR = Special ranking
- SE = Special exempt
- JE = Junior exempt
- JR = Junior Accelerator Programme entrant
- CO = College Accelerator Programme entrant
- NG = Next Gen Accelerator Program entrant
- w/o = Walkover
- r = Retired
- d = Defaulted

=== Finals ===
Semifinals
1	(Hong Kong) Coleman Wong	7^{7}	6
(China) Zhou Yi	6^{3}	3
3	(Australia) Tristan Schoolkate	6^{4}	6	7^{7}
WC	(China) Cui Jie	7^{7}	4	6^{2}

Final
1	(Hong Kong) Coleman Wong	6	6^{3}	4
3	(Australia) Tristan Schoolkate	4	7^{7}	6

=== Top half ===
First round
1	(Hong Kong) C Wong	6	7^{7}
Alt	(Australia) Ja Delaney	4	6^{4}
LL	(Thailand) K Samrej	2	6	7^{7}
(Japan) R Noguchi	6	1	6^{3}
NG	(Serbia) O Milić	4	7^{7}	6^{5}
(Japan) J Friend	6	6^{3}	7^{7}
(Australia) J McCabe	6	6^{2}	7^{8}
5	(Sweden) E Ymer	0	7^{7}	6^{6}
4	(China) Z Zhang	7^{7}	6
Alt	(Japan) K Uchida	6^{1}	3
Q	(Japan) Koki Matsuda	1	3
(China) Y Zhou	6	6
Q	(Uzbekistan) K Sultanov	7^{7}	7^{7}
Q	(Switzerland) L Castelnuovo	6^{5}	6^{5}
(Turkey) Mert Alkaya	4	6	1
6	(United States) Andre Ilagan	6	3	6

Second round
1	(Hong Kong) C Wong	4	6	6
LL	(Thailand) K Samrej	6	3	4
(Japan) J Friend	4	7^{7}	6
(Australia) J McCabe	6	6^{1}	4
4	(China) Z Zhang	3	4
(China) Y Zhou	6	6
Q	(Uzbekistan) K Sultanov	5	2
6	(United States) A Ilagan	7	6

Quarterfinals
1	(Hong Kong) C Wong	7^{7}	6
(Japan) J Friend	6^{5}	1
(China) Y Zhou	7^{7}	6
6	(United States) A Ilagan	6^{2}	2

Semifinals
1	(Hong Kong) C Wong	7^{7}	6
(China) Y Zhou	6^{3}	3

=== Bottom half ===
First round
7	(United States) K Smith	6	7^{7}
Q	(Australia) M Purcell	4	6^{1}
(China) F Sun	6	6
WC	(China) Sun Qian	4	2
(Australia) C Hewitt	4	6	7^{13}
WC	(China) R Te	6	4	6^{11}
(Uzbekistan) S Fomin	2	6	4
3	(Australia) T Schoolkate	6	4	6
8	(United Kingdom) L Broady	6^{5}	6	6
Q	(Czech Republic) D Palán	7^{7}	4	2
Q	Y Demin	6	4	3
(Japan) A Santillan	4	6	6
(Chinese Taipei) Y-h Hsu	2	4
WC	(China) J Cui	6	6
(Japan) H Matsuoka	2	3
2	(China) Y Wu	6	6

Second round
7	(United States) K Smith	3	6	7^{7}
(China) F Sun	6	4	6^{3}
(Australia) C Hewitt
3	(Australia) T Schoolkate	w/o
8	(United Kingdom) L Broady	4	4
(Japan) A Santillan	6	6
WC	(China) J Cui	7^{7}	7^{9}
2	(China) Y Wu	6^{4}	6^{7}

Quarterfinals
7	(United States) K Smith	6^{4}	3
3	(Australia) T Schoolkate	7^{7}	6
(Japan) A Santillan	4	3
WC	(China) J Cui	6	6

Semifinals
3	(Australia) T Schoolkate	6^{4}	6	7^{7}
WC	(China) J Cui	7^{7}	4	6^{2}
