= 2011 ATP Challenger Guangzhou – Doubles =

Doubles
- 2011 ATP Challenger Guangzhou

Final
- Champions: (Russia) Michail Elgin (Russia) Alexandre Kudryavtsev
- Runners-up: (Thailand) Sanchai Ratiwatana (Thailand) Sonchat Ratiwatana
- Score: 7–6(3), 6–3

Events
Singles	Doubles
- ATP Challenger Guangzhou

Michail Elgin and Alexandre Kudryavtsev defeated Sanchai Ratiwatana and Sonchat Ratiwatana 7–6(3), 6–3 in the final.

== Seeds ==
1. (United Kingdom) Colin Fleming / (United Kingdom) Ross Hutchins (quarterfinals)
2. (Austria) Philipp Oswald / (Austria) Alexander Peya (semifinals)
3. (Thailand) Sanchai Ratiwatana / (Thailand) Sonchat Ratiwatana (final)
4. (Russia) Michail Elgin / (Russia) Alexandre Kudryavtsev (champions)

== Draw ==
Key

- Q = Qualifier
- WC = Wild card
- LL = Lucky loser
- Alt = Alternate
- ITF = ITF entry
- PR = Protected ranking
- SR = Special ranking
- SE = Special exempt
- JE = Junior exempt
- JR = Junior Accelerator Programme entrant
- CO = College Accelerator Programme entrant
- NG = Next Gen Accelerator Program entrant
- w/o = Walkover
- r = Retired
- d = Defaulted

=== Draw ===
First round
1	(United Kingdom) C Fleming (United Kingdom) R Hutchins	7	6
(China) M Gong (China) Z Li	6^{5}	3
(Finland) H Heliövaara (Russia) E Kirillov	2	6	[2]
(Belarus) U Ignatik (Austria) N Moser	6	3	[10]
3	(Thailand) S Ratiwatana (Thailand) S Ratiwatana	7	6
(Germany) M Bachinger (Croatia) N Mektić	6^{6}	3
(Croatia) A Veić (Croatia) I Zovko	5	7	[4]
(Germany) S Rieschick (Thailand) D Udomchoke	7	6^{4}	[10]
(Australia) S Kadir (Chinese Taipei) H-h Lee	6	6^{2}	[5]
(Ukraine) S Bubka (Slovakia) L Lacko	3	7	[10]
WC	(China) D Wu (China) Z Zhang	6	6^{4}	[3]
4	(Russia) M Elgin (Russia) A Kudryavtsev	3	7	[10]
(Germany) D Meffert (Germany) S Stadler	7	6
WC	(China) W Gao (China) Gao Peng	6^{4}	3
WC	(China) Chang Yu (China) Zhuo Zhuoqing	2	2
2	(Austria) P Oswald (Austria) A Peya	6	6

Quarterfinals
1	(United Kingdom) C Fleming (United Kingdom) R Hutchins	6	1	[3]
(Belarus) U Ignatik (Austria) N Moser	3	6	[10]
3	(Thailand) S Ratiwatana (Thailand) S Ratiwatana	6	6
(Germany) S Rieschick (Thailand) D Udomchoke	4	2
(Ukraine) S Bubka (Slovakia) L Lacko	3	6^{7}
4	(Russia) M Elgin (Russia) A Kudryavtsev	6	7
(Germany) D Meffert (Germany) S Stadler	4	4
2	(Austria) P Oswald (Austria) A Peya	6	6

Semifinals
(Belarus) U Ignatik (Austria) N Moser	1	6	[9]
3	(Thailand) S Ratiwatana (Thailand) S Ratiwatana	6	4	[11]
4	(Russia) M Elgin (Russia) A Kudryavtsev	6	3	[10]
2	(Austria) P Oswald (Austria) A Peya	3	6	[7]

Finals
3	(Thailand) S Ratiwatana (Thailand) S Ratiwatana	6^{3}	3
4	(Russia) M Elgin (Russia) A Kudryavtsev	7	6
