= 2014 ATP Challenger Guangzhou – Singles =

Singles
- 2014 ATP Challenger Guangzhou

Final
- Champion: (Slovenia) Blaž Rola
- Runner-up: (Japan) Yūichi Sugita
- Score: 6–7^{(4–7)}, 6–4, 6–3

Events
Singles	Doubles
← 2013 ·	ATP Challenger Guangzhou	· 2015 →

Uladzimir Ignatik was the defending champion, but decided not to compete.

Blaž Rola won the title, defeating Yūichi Sugita in the final, 6–7^{(4–7)}, 6–4, 6–3

== Seeds ==
1. (Japan) Go Soeda (semifinals)
2. (Slovenia) Blaž Rola (champion)
3. (Japan) Tatsuma Ito (first round)
4. (Japan) Yūichi Sugita (final)
5. (Moldova) Radu Albot (first round)
6. (Japan) Hiroki Moriya (second round)
7. (Italy) Thomas Fabbiano (first round)
8. (Germany) Andreas Beck (withdrew because of travel issues)
9. (Australia) Matt Reid (second round)

== Draw ==
=== Key ===
- Q = Qualifier
- WC = Wild card
- LL = Lucky loser
- Alt = Alternate
- SE = Special exempt
- PR = Protected ranking
- ITF = ITF entry
- JE = Junior exempt
- w/o = Walkover
- r = Retired
- d = Defaulted
- SR = Special ranking

=== Finals ===
Semifinals
1	(Japan) Go Soeda	6^{5}	2
4	(Japan) Yūichi Sugita	7^{7}	6
Q	(New Zealand) Michael Venus	3	2
2	(Slovenia) Blaž Rola	6	6

Final
4	(Japan) Yūichi Sugita	7^{7}	4	3
2	(Slovenia) Blaž Rola	6^{4}	6	6

=== Top half ===
First round
1	(Japan) G Soeda	6	6
WC	(China) C Wang	2	2
(Chinese Taipei) T Chen	6^{6}	7^{8}	3
(China) D Wu	7^{8}	6^{6}	6
WC	(China) S Liu	3	5
(Austria) M Neuchrist	6	7
(Austria) M Fischer	6	7^{7}
7	(Italy) T Fabbiano	2	6^{4}
4	(Japan) Y Sugita	6	6
WC	(China) X Gao	3	1
Q	(Republic of Ireland) L Sorensen	6	7^{7}
Q	(China) M Gong	2	6^{1}
(Australia) B Mitchell	5	0
(Germany) M Bachinger	7	6
(Egypt) M Safwat	6^{8}	4
9	(Australia) M Reid	7^{10}	6

Second round
1	(Japan) G Soeda	6	7^{13}
(China) D Wu	1	6^{11}
(Austria) M Neuchrist	6^{4}	2
(Austria) M Fischer	7^{7}	6
4	(Japan) Y Sugita	6	6
Q	(Republic of Ireland) L Sorensen	2	4
(Germany) M Bachinger	6	7^{7}
9	(Australia) M Reid	1	6^{5}

Quarterfinals
1	(Japan) G Soeda	6	4	7^{8}
(Austria) M Fischer	3	6	6^{6}
4	(Japan) Y Sugita	6	6
(Germany) M Bachinger	1	4

Semifinals
1	(Japan) G Soeda	6^{5}	2
4	(Japan) Y Sugita	7^{7}	6

=== Bottom half ===
First round
5	(Moldova) R Albot	2	2
(Chinese Taipei) L-c Huang	6	6
(Portugal) R Machado	6	7
WC	(Hong Kong) B Ouyang	2	5
(Chinese Taipei) T-h Yang	4	6	1
Q	(New Zealand) M Venus	6	3	6
LL	(Italy) R Ghedin	7^{7}	6
3	(Japan) T Ito	6^{4}	4
6	(Japan) H Moriya	6	2
Q	(Japan) T Matsui	2	0^{r}
(Israel) A Weintraub	7	6
(Germany) N Langer	5	3
PR	(South Africa) I van der Merwe	6	3	2
(China) Z Zhang	4	6	6
(Spain) G Granollers	6	3	2
2	(Slovenia) B Rola	4	6	6

Second round
(Chinese Taipei) L-c Huang	2	1
(Portugal) R Machado	6	6
Q	(New Zealand) M Venus	7^{7}	6
LL	(Italy) R Ghedin	6^{3}	4
6	(Japan) H Moriya	3	6	1
(Israel) A Weintraub	6	3	6
(China) Z Zhang	6	3	4
2	(Slovenia) B Rola	4	6	6

Quarterfinals
(Portugal) R Machado	6^{1}	6^{13}
Q	(New Zealand) M Venus	7^{7}	7^{15}
(Israel) A Weintraub	6^{8}	4
2	(Slovenia) B Rola	7^{10}	6

Semifinals
Q	(New Zealand) M Venus	3	2
2	(Slovenia) B Rola	6	6
