= 2023 Guangzhou International Challenger – Doubles =

Doubles
- 2023 Guangzhou International Challenger

Final
- Champions: (Switzerland) Antoine Bellier (Switzerland) Luca Castelnuovo
- Runners-up: (Chinese Taipei) Ray Ho (Australia) Matthew Romios
- Score: 6–3, 7–6^{(7–5)}

Events
Singles	Doubles
← 2016 ·	Guangzhou International Challenger	· 2024 →

Alexander Kudryavtsev and Denys Molchanov were the defending champions but chose not to defend their title.

Antoine Bellier and Luca Castelnuovo won the title after defeating Ray Ho and Matthew Romios 6–3, 7–6^{(7–5)} in the final.

== Seeds ==
1. (Australia) Alex Bolt / (Australia) Luke Saville (semifinals)
2. (Chinese Taipei) Ray Ho / (Australia) Matthew Romios (final)
3. (Northern Mariana Islands) Colin Sinclair / (Australia) Dane Sweeny (first round)
4. (Greece) Markos Kalovelonis / (Japan) Toshihide Matsui (quarterfinals)

== Draw ==
Key

- Q = Qualifier
- WC = Wild card
- LL = Lucky loser
- Alt = Alternate
- ITF = ITF entry
- PR = Protected ranking
- SR = Special ranking
- SE = Special exempt
- JE = Junior exempt
- JR = Junior Accelerator Programme entrant
- CO = College Accelerator Programme entrant
- NG = Next Gen Accelerator Program entrant
- w/o = Walkover
- r = Retired
- d = Defaulted

First round
1	(Australia) A Bolt (Australia) L Saville	6	6
(Indonesia) Nathan Anthony Barki (Indonesia) C Rungkat	1	4
(Australia) O Jasika (Japan) H Moriya	7	6
(Poland) F Peliwo (Greece) S Sakellaridis	5	4
4	(Greece) M Kalovelonis (Japan) T Matsui	6	6^{1}	[10]
E Gerasimov; Mikalai Haliak	3	7^{7}	[7]
(Switzerland) A Bellier (Switzerland) L Castelnuovo	7^{7}	6
Alt	(China) X Gao (China) A Wang	6^{2}	2
(Japan) R Noguchi (France) A Weber	6	6
(Australia) Dong Jiayang (China) Sun Qian	3	4
WC	(China) Y Bu (China) M Gong	7^{7}	5	[10]
3	(Northern Mariana Islands) C Sinclair (Australia) D Sweeny	6^{4}	7	[6]
(United States) A Ayeni (India) A Kadhe	7	6
WC	(China) Y Mo (China) Zeng Yaojie	5	1
(China) Wang Chukang (Germany) Jimmy Yang	6^{3}	4
2	(Chinese Taipei) R Ho (Australia) MC Romios	7^{7}	6

Quarterfinals
1	(Australia) A Bolt (Australia) L Saville	6	6
(Australia) O Jasika (Japan) H Moriya	1	2
4	(Greece) M Kalovelonis (Japan) T Matsui	2	3
(Switzerland) A Bellier (Switzerland) L Castelnuovo	6	6
(Japan) R Noguchi (France) A Weber	3	1
WC	(China) Y Bu (China) M Gong	6	6
(United States) A Ayeni (India) A Kadhe	1	4
2	(Chinese Taipei) R Ho (Australia) MC Romios	6	6

Semifinals
1	(Australia) A Bolt (Australia) L Saville	2	6	[7]
(Switzerland) A Bellier (Switzerland) L Castelnuovo	6	3	[10]
WC	(China) Y Bu (China) M Gong	6^{6}	2
2	(Chinese Taipei) R Ho (Australia) MC Romios	7^{8}	6

Final
(Switzerland) A Bellier (Switzerland) L Castelnuovo	6	7^{7}
2	(Chinese Taipei) R Ho (Australia) MC Romios	3	6^{5}
