= 2014 ATP Challenger Guangzhou =

- Date: 24 February – 2 March
- Edition: 3rd
- Surface: Hard
- Location: Guangzhou, China

Champions

Singles
- (Slovenia) Blaž Rola

Doubles
- (Thailand) Sanchai Ratiwatana / (Thailand) Sonchat Ratiwatana
← 2011 ·	ATP Challenger Guangzhou	· 2015 →

The 2014 ATP Challenger Guangzhou was a professional tennis tournament played on hard courts. It was the third edition of the tournament which was part of the 2014 ATP Challenger Tour. It took place in Guangzhou, China between 24 February and 2 March 2014.

== ATP entrants ==
=== Seeds ===
Country	Player	Rank^{1}	Seed
JPN	Go Soeda	138	1
SLO	Blaž Rola	152	2
JPN	Tatsuma Ito	153	3
JPN	Yūichi Sugita	164	4
MDA	Radu Albot	165	5
JPN	Hiroki Moriya	166	6
ITA	Thomas Fabbiano	181	7
GER	Andreas Beck	183	8

- Rankings are as of February 24, 2014.

=== Other entrants ===
The following players received wildcards into the singles main draw:

- (China) Gao Xin
- (China) Liu Siyu
- (China) Ouyang Bowen
- (China) Wang Chuhan

The following entrant has been granted entry as a Lucky loser into the main draw:

- (Italy) Riccardo Ghedin

The following players used Protected Rankings to gain entry into the singles main draw:

- (South Africa) Izak van der Merwe

The following players received entry from the qualifying draw:

- (Japan) Toshihide Matsui
- (China) Gong Maoxin
- (Republic of Ireland) Louk Sorensen
- (New Zealand) Michael Venus

== Champions ==
=== Singles ===
- (Slovenia) Blaž Rola def. (Japan) Yūichi Sugita, 6–7^{(4–7)}, 6–4, 6–3

=== Doubles ===
- (Thailand) Sanchai Ratiwatana / (Thailand) Sonchat Ratiwatana def. (Chinese Taipei) Lee Hsin-han / (Israel) Amir Weintraub, 6–2, 6–4
