= 2011 ATP Challenger Guangzhou =

Tennis tournament

- Date: 14–20 March
- Edition: 2nd
- Surface: Hard
- Location: Guangzhou, China

Champions

Singles
- (Belarus) Uladzimir Ignatik

Doubles
- (Russia) Mikhail Elgin / (Russia) Alexander Kudryavtsev
← 2008 ·	ATP Challenger Guangzhou	· 2014 →

The 2011 ATP Challenger Guangzhou was a professional tennis tournament played on hard courts. It was the second edition of the tournament which was part of the 2011 ATP Challenger Tour. It took place in Guangzhou, China between 14 and 20 March 2011.

== ATP entrants ==
=== Seeds ===
Country	Player	Rank^{1}	Seed
JPN	Go Soeda	109	1
SVK	Lukáš Lacko	119	2
BEL	Steve Darcis	129	3
RUS	Alexander Kudryavtsev	144	4
GER	Matthias Bachinger	160	5
JPN	Tatsuma Ito	173	6
BLR	Uladzimir Ignatik	200	7
GER	Dominik Meffert	211	8

- Rankings are as of March 7, 2011.

=== Other entrants ===
The following players received wildcards into the singles main draw:

- (China) Gong Maoxin
- (China) Li Zhe
- (China) Wu Di
- (China) Zhang Ze

The following entrant has been granted a Special Exemption into the main draw:

- (Germany) Cedrik-Marcel Stebe

The following players received entry from the qualifying draw:

- (Brazil) Tiago Fernandes
- (United Kingdom) Colin Fleming
- (Australia) Sadik Kadir
- (Australia) Benjamin Mitchell

== Champions ==
=== Singles ===
(Belarus) Uladzimir Ignatik def. (Russia) Alexander Kudryavtsev, 6–4, 6–4

=== Doubles ===
(Russia) Mikhail Elgin / (Russia) Alexander Kudryavtsev def. (Thailand) Sanchai Ratiwatana / (Thailand) Sonchat Ratiwatana, 7–6(3), 6–3
