= 2025 Guangzhou International Challenger =

- Date: 28 April – 4 May
- Edition: 8th
- Surface: Hard
- Location: Guangzhou, China

Champions

Singles
- (France) Térence Atmane

Doubles
- (Chinese Taipei) Ray Ho / (Australia) Matthew Romios
← 2024 ·	Guangzhou International Challenger	· 2026 →

The 2025 Guangzhou International Challenger, known as the Guangzhou Nansha Challenger, was a professional tennis tournament played on hardcourts. It was the 8th edition of the tournament which was part of the 2025 ATP Challenger Tour. It took place in Guangzhou, China between 28 April and 4 May 2025.

== Singles main-draw entrants ==
=== Seeds ===
Country	Player	Rank^{1}	Seed
AUS	Adam Walton	86	1
USA	Brandon Holt	110	2
AUS	Tristan Schoolkate	122	3
FRA	Térence Atmane	136	4
AUS	Li Tu	164	5
FRA	Hugo Grenier	175	6
AUS	James McCabe	176	7
FRA	Constant Lestienne	180	8

^{1} Rankings are as of 21 April 2025.

=== Other entrants ===
The following players received wildcards into the singles main draw:

- (China) Charles Chen
- (China) Te Rigele
- (China) Zhou Yi

The following player received entry into the singles main draw using a protected ranking:

- ~~(Australia) Jason Kubler~~

The following player received entry into the singles main draw through the Junior Accelerator Programme:

- (South Korea) Roh Ho-young

The following players received entry into the singles main draw as alternates:

- (China) Cui Jie
- Ilia Simakin
- (China) Sun Fajing

The following players received entry from the qualifying draw:

- (Australia) Moerani Bouzige
- (United States) Andre Ilagan
- (United States) Christian Langmo
- (China) Mo Yecong
- (United Kingdom) Ryan Peniston
- (Germany) Mats Rosenkranz

The following player received entry as a lucky loser:

- (Thailand) Kasidit Samrej

== Champions ==
=== Singles ===
- (France) Térence Atmane def. (Australia) Tristan Schoolkate 6–3, 7–6^{(7–4)}.

=== Doubles ===
- (Chinese Taipei) Ray Ho / (Australia) Matthew Romios def. (United States) Vasil Kirkov / (Netherlands) Bart Stevens 6–3, 6–4.
