= 2026 Guangzhou International Challenger – Doubles =

Doubles
- 2026 Guangzhou International Challenger

Final
- Champions: (Netherlands) Thijmen Loof (Japan) Kaito Uesugi
- Runners-up: (Chinese Taipei) Hsu Yu-hsiou (China) Sun Fajing
- Score: 6–2, 6–2

Events
Singles	Doubles
- Guangzhou International Challenger

Ray Ho and Matthew Romios were the defending champions but chose not to defend their title.

Thijmen Loof and Kaito Uesugi won the title after defeating Hsu Yu-hsiou and Sun Fajing 6–2, 6–2 in the final.

== Seeds ==
1. (India) Siddhant Banthia / (Thailand) Pruchya Isaro (quarterfinals)
2. (Netherlands) Thijmen Loof / (Japan) Kaito Uesugi (champions)
3. (Australia) Blake Bayldon / (Australia) Thomas Fancutt (quarterfinals)
4. (Australia) Jesse Delaney / (Australia) Calum Puttergill (first round)

== Draw ==
Key

- Q = Qualifier
- WC = Wild card
- LL = Lucky loser
- Alt = Alternate
- ITF = ITF entry
- PR = Protected ranking
- SR = Special ranking
- SE = Special exempt
- JE = Junior exempt
- JR = Junior Accelerator Programme entrant
- CO = College Accelerator Programme entrant
- NG = Next Gen Accelerator Program entrant
- w/o = Walkover
- r = Retired
- d = Defaulted

First round
1	(India) S Banthia (Thailand) P Isaro	6	6^{5}	[11]
WC	(China) Sun Qian (China) S Tang	3	7^{7}	[9]
(Japan) M Imamura (Japan) Yamato Sueoka	1	4
(Chinese Taipei) Y-h Hsu (China) F Sun	6	6
3	(Australia) B Bayldon (Australia) T Fancutt	7	7^{7}
(Chinese Taipei) J Hsu (United States) Andre Ilagan	5	6^{3}
(Australia) O Jasika (Australia) J McCabe	1	4
(United Kingdom) L Broady (New Zealand) A Rai	6	6
S Betov (Chinese Taipei) C-p Hsieh	3	1
(Japan) A Santillan (China) B Zheng	6	6
Semen Pankin (Sweden) E Ymer	6	6
4	(Australia) Je Delaney (Australia) C Puttergill	3	3
(Australia) Ja Delaney (Japan) K Uchida	6	6
WC	(China) Fang Zhiming (China) Huang Xicheng	4	1
(Italy) A Binda (China) A Wang	6^{3}	2
2	(Netherlands) T Loof (Japan) K Uesugi	7^{7}	6

Quarterfinals
1	(India) S Banthia (Thailand) P Isaro	2	4
(Chinese Taipei) Y-h Hsu (China) F Sun	6	6
3	(Australia) B Bayldon (Australia) T Fancutt	5	6^{7}
(United Kingdom) L Broady (New Zealand) A Rai	7	7^{9}
(Japan) A Santillan (China) B Zheng	6^{5}	6^{7}
S Pankin (Sweden) E Ymer	7^{7}	7^{9}
(Australia) Ja Delaney (Japan) K Uchida	3	6	[8]
2	(Netherlands) T Loof (Japan) K Uesugi	6	3	[10]

Semifinals
(Chinese Taipei) Y-h Hsu (China) F Sun	6	6
(United Kingdom) L Broady (New Zealand) A Rai	4	4
S Pankin (Sweden) E Ymer	6^{4}	1
2	(Netherlands) T Loof (Japan) K Uesugi	7^{7}	6

Final
(Chinese Taipei) Y-h Hsu (China) F Sun	2	2
2	(Netherlands) T Loof (Japan) K Uesugi	6	6
