= 2024 Guangzhou International Challenger =

- Date: 29 April – 5 May
- Edition: 7th
- Surface: Hard
- Location: Guangzhou, China

Champions

Singles
- (Australia) Tristan Schoolkate

Doubles
- (Australia) Blake Ellis / (Australia) Tristan Schoolkate
← 2023 ·	Guangzhou International Challenger	· 2025 →

The 2024 Guangzhou International Challenger, known as the Guangzhou Nansha Challenger, was a professional tennis tournament played on hardcourts. It was the 7th edition of the tournament which was part of the 2024 ATP Challenger Tour. It took place in Guangzhou, China between 29 April and 5 May 2024.

== Singles main-draw entrants ==
=== Seeds ===
Country	Player	Rank^{1}	Seed
AUS	Max Purcell	80	1
AUS	James Duckworth	113	2
AUS	Adam Walton	119	3
~~RSA~~	~~Lloyd Harris~~	~~149~~	~~4~~
CHN	Bu Yunchaokete	167	5
JPN	Yasutaka Uchiyama	168	6
USA	Maxime Cressy	178	7
ITA	Mattia Bellucci	181	8

^{1} Rankings are as of 22 April 2024.

=== Other entrants ===
The following players received wildcards into the singles main draw:

- (China) Te Rigele
- (China) Wang Jiaji
- (China) Zhou Yi

The following player received entry into the singles main draw as an alternate:

- (United States) Brandon Holt

The following players received entry from the qualifying draw:

- (China) Bai Yan
- (Lithuania) Ričardas Berankis
- (China) Cui Jie
- Egor Gerasimov
- (Japan) Hiroki Moriya
- (Japan) Rio Noguchi

The following player received entry as a lucky loser:

- (Japan) Yuta Shimizu

== Champions ==
=== Singles ===
- (Australia) Tristan Schoolkate def. (Australia) Adam Walton 6–3, 3–6, 6–3.

=== Doubles ===
- (Australia) Blake Ellis / (Australia) Tristan Schoolkate def. (South Korea) Nam Ji-sung / (Finland) Patrik Niklas-Salminen 6–2, 6–7^{(4–7)}, [10–4].
