= 2014 ATP Challenger Guangzhou – Doubles =

Doubles
- 2014 ATP Challenger Guangzhou

Final
- Champions: (Thailand) Sanchai Ratiwatana (Thailand) Sonchat Ratiwatana
- Runners-up: (Chinese Taipei) Lee Hsin-han (Israel) Amir Weintraub
- Score: 6–2, 6–4

Events
| Singles | Doubles |
| ← 2013 · | ATP Challenger Guangzhou | · 2015 → |

Michail Elgin and Alexandre Kudryavtsev were the defending champions, but decided not to compete.

Sanchai and Sonchat Ratiwatana won the title, defeating Lee Hsin-han and Amir Weintraub in the final, 6–2, 6–4.

== Seeds ==
1. (Thailand) Sanchai Ratiwatana / (Thailand) Sonchat Ratiwatana (champions)
2. (Australia) Matt Reid / (New Zealand) Michael Venus (first round)
3. (Chinese Taipei) Chen Ti / (Austria) Maximilian Neuchrist (semifinals)
4. (Italy) Riccardo Ghedin / (Italy) Claudio Grassi (quarterfinals)

== Draw ==
=== Key ===
- Q = Qualifier
- WC = Wild card
- LL = Lucky loser
- Alt = Alternate
- SE = Special exempt
- PR = Protected ranking
- ITF = ITF entry
- JE = Junior exempt
- w/o = Walkover
- r = Retired
- d = Defaulted
- SR = Special ranking

=== Draw ===
First round
1 | (Thailand) Sa Ratiwatana (Thailand) So Ratiwatana | 6 | 6
(Austria) M Fischer (Australia) B Mitchell | 0 | 3
WC | (China) M Gong (China) Z Li | 6 | 7^{7}
(Moldova) R Albot (Japan) T Matsui | 0 | 6^{2}
3 | (Chinese Taipei) T Chen (Austria) M Neuchrist | 6 | 7^{7}
WC | (China) S Liu (China) C Wang | 3 | 6^{2}
(Spain) G Granollers (Portugal) R Machado | 6 | 1 | [10]
(South Africa) R Roelofse (South Africa) I van der Merwe | 2 | 6 | [6]
(Chinese Taipei) H-h Lee (Israel) A Weintraub | 6 | 6
WC | (China) X Gao (Hong Kong) B Ouyang | 3 | 2
(Chinese Taipei) H-y Peng (Chinese Taipei) T-h Yang | 2 | 6^{4}
4 | (Italy) R Ghedin (Italy) C Grassi | 6 | 7^{7}
(Germany) N Langer (Republic of Ireland) L Sorensen | 6^{8} | 3
(China) D Wu (China) Z Zhang | 7^{10} | 6
(Chinese Taipei) L-c Huang (Japan) Y Sugita | 3 | 7^{7} | [10]
2 | (Australia) M Reid (New Zealand) M Venus | 6 | 6^{3} | [7]

Quarterfinals
1 | (Thailand) Sa Ratiwatana (Thailand) So Ratiwatana | 7 | 3 | [10]
WC | (China) M Gong (China) Z Li | 5 | 6 | [6]
3 | (Chinese Taipei) T Chen (Austria) M Neuchrist | 7^{7} | 6
(Spain) G Granollers (Portugal) R Machado | 6^{4} | 3
(Chinese Taipei) H-h Lee (Israel) A Weintraub | 4 | 6 | [10]
4 | (Italy) R Ghedin (Italy) C Grassi | 6 | 3 | [7]
(China) D Wu (China) Z Zhang | 3 | 2
(Chinese Taipei) L-c Huang (Japan) Y Sugita | 6 | 6

Semifinals
1 | (Thailand) Sa Ratiwatana (Thailand) So Ratiwatana | 6 | 4 | [10]
3 | (Chinese Taipei) T Chen (Austria) M Neuchrist | 4 | 6 | [6]
(Chinese Taipei) H-h Lee (Israel) A Weintraub | w/o
(Chinese Taipei) L-c Huang (Japan) Y Sugita

Final
1 | (Thailand) Sa Ratiwatana (Thailand) So Ratiwatana | 6 | 6
(Chinese Taipei) H-h Lee (Israel) A Weintraub | 2 | 4
