= 2011 ATP Challenger Guangzhou – Singles =

Singles
- 2011 ATP Challenger Guangzhou

Final
- Champion: (Belarus) Uladzimir Ignatik
- Runner-up: (Russia) Alexander Kudryavtsev
- Score: 6–4, 6–4

Events
Singles	Doubles
- ATP Challenger Guangzhou

Uladzimir Ignatik won the first edition of this tournament. He defeated Alexander Kudryavtsev 6–4, 6–4 in the final.

== Seeds ==
1. (Japan) Go Soeda (first round)
2. (Slovakia) Lukáš Lacko (second round)
3. (Belgium) Steve Darcis (quarterfinals)
4. (Russia) Alexander Kudryavtsev (final)
5. (Germany) Matthias Bachinger (semifinals)
6. (Japan) Tatsuma Ito (quarterfinals)
7. (Belarus) Uladzimir Ignatik (champion)
8. (Germany) Dominik Meffert (quarterfinals)

== Draw ==
Key

- Q = Qualifier
- WC = Wild card
- LL = Lucky loser
- Alt = Alternate
- ITF = ITF entry
- PR = Protected ranking
- SR = Special ranking
- SE = Special exempt
- JE = Junior exempt
- JR = Junior Accelerator Programme entrant
- CO = College Accelerator Programme entrant
- NG = Next Gen Accelerator Program entrant
- w/o = Walkover
- r = Retired
- d = Defaulted

=== Finals ===
Semifinals
5	(Germany) Matthias Bachinger	5	4
4	(Russia) Alexander Kudryavtsev	7	6
7	(Belarus) Uladzimir Ignatik	6	6
SE	(Germany) Cedrik-Marcel Stebe	2	0

Final
4	(Russia) Alexander Kudryavtsev	4	4
7	(Belarus) Uladzimir Ignatik	6	6

=== Top half ===
First round
1	(Japan) G Soeda	4	4
LL	(Ukraine) S Bubka	6	6
(Germany) S Rieschick	6	6
Q	(Australia) B Mitchell	3	3
WC	(China) M Gong	6	6
Q	(Australia) S Kadir	4	4
WC	(China) Z Zhang	6	4	3
5	(Germany) M Bachinger	4	6	6
4	(Russia) A Kudryavtsev	6	6
(Spain) A Brugués Davi	0	1
(Portugal) J Sousa	6	2	6^{6}
(Germany) S Stadler	4	6	7
(Croatia) A Veić	6	6
(Ukraine) I Sergeyev	3	4
(Netherlands) M Middelkoop	3	6	6^{9}
6	(Japan) T Ito	6	0	7

Second round
LL	(Ukraine) S Bubka	1	2
(Germany) S Rieschick	6	6
WC	(China) M Gong	5	1
5	(Germany) M Bachinger	7	6
4	(Russia) A Kudryavtsev	7	6
(Germany) S Stadler	6^{5}	3
(Croatia) A Veić	7	5	4
6	(Japan) T Ito	6^{5}	7	6

Quarterfinals
(Germany) S Rieschick	0	1
5	(Germany) M Bachinger	6	6
4	(Russia) A Kudryavtsev	6	6
6	(Japan) T Ito	4	3

Semifinals
5	(Germany) M Bachinger	5	4
4	(Russia) A Kudryavtsev	7	6

=== Bottom half ===
First round
7	(Belarus) U Ignatik	4	6	7
(Thailand) D Udomchoke	6	2	6^{3}
(Finland) H Heliövaara	7	6
WC	(China) Z Li	5	2
WC	(China) D Wu	6	3	4
(Croatia) N Mektić	3	6	6
(Russia) E Kirillov	4	3
3	(Belgium) S Darcis	6	6
8	(Germany) D Meffert	6	6^{3}	6
(Austria) A Peya	1	7	3
Q	(Brazil) T Fernandes	6	6
(Italy) G Naso	4	2
Q	(United Kingdom) C Fleming	6^{5}	6	6^{4}
SE	(Germany) C-M Stebe	7	4	7
(Belgium) D Goffin	2	3
2	(Slovakia) L Lacko	6	6

Second round
7	(Belarus) U Ignatik	7	6
(Finland) H Heliövaara	6^{2}	1
(Croatia) N Mektić	5	6^{2}
3	(Belgium) S Darcis	7	7
8	(Germany) D Meffert	6	6
Q	(Brazil) T Fernandes	4	3
SE	(Germany) C-M Stebe	6	6
2	(Slovakia) L Lacko	3	3

Quarterfinals
7	(Belarus) U Ignatik	7	6
3	(Belgium) S Darcis	6^{4}	3
8	(Germany) D Meffert	3	6^{3}
SE	(Germany) C-M Stebe	6	7

Semifinals
7	(Belarus) U Ignatik	6	6
SE	(Germany) C-M Stebe	2	0
