= 2025 Guangzhou International Challenger – Doubles =

Doubles
- 2025 Guangzhou International Challenger

Final
- Champions: (Chinese Taipei) Ray Ho (Australia) Matthew Romios
- Runners-up: (United States) Vasil Kirkov (Netherlands) Bart Stevens
- Score: 6–3, 6–4

Events
Singles	Doubles
- Guangzhou International Challenger

Blake Ellis and Tristan Schoolkate were the defending champions but chose not to defend their title.

Ray Ho and Matthew Romios won the title after defeating Vasil Kirkov and Bart Stevens 6–3, 6–4 in the final.

== Seeds ==
1. (Chinese Taipei) Ray Ho / (Australia) Matthew Romios (champions)
2. (United States) Vasil Kirkov / (Netherlands) Bart Stevens (final)
3. (Australia) Blake Bayldon / (United States) Reese Stalder (quarterfinals)
4. (Israel) Daniel Cukierman / (United Kingdom) Joshua Paris (semifinals)

== Draw ==
Key

- Q = Qualifier
- WC = Wild card
- LL = Lucky loser
- Alt = Alternate
- ITF = ITF entry
- PR = Protected ranking
- SR = Special ranking
- SE = Special exempt
- JE = Junior exempt
- JR = Junior Accelerator Programme entrant
- CO = College Accelerator Programme entrant
- NG = Next Gen Accelerator Program entrant
- w/o = Walkover
- r = Retired
- d = Defaulted

=== Draw ===
First round
1	(Chinese Taipei) R Ho (Australia) MC Romios	6	6
Alt	(Japan) R Noguchi (New Zealand) A Rai	3	3
(India) R Ramanathan (China) F Sun	7	6
(Philippines) FC Alcantara (Thailand) P Isaro	5	2
4	(Israel) D Cukierman (United Kingdom) J Paris	6	7
WC	(China) J Cui (China) R Te	2	5
(Australia) Ja Delaney (Australia) L Tu	6	6
WC	(China) Yang Zijiang (China) Zeng Yaojie	3	4
(Australia) K Pearson (Northern Mariana Islands) C Sinclair	6^{5}	2
(South Korea) J-s Nam (Japan) T Yuzuki	7^{7}	6
(France) H Grenier (France) C Lestienne	4	4
3	(Australia) B Bayldon (United States) R Stalder	6	6
(Chinese Taipei) Y-h Hsu (China) A Wang	7^{7}	6
(Australia) Je Delaney (Australia) O Jasika	6^{5}	2
E Agafonov; A Kachmazov	3	4
2	(United States) V Kirkov (Netherlands) B Stevens	6	6

Quarterfinals
1	(Chinese Taipei) R Ho (Australia) MC Romios	5	6	[10]
(India) R Ramanathan (China) F Sun	7	4	[4]
4	(Israel) D Cukierman (United Kingdom) J Paris	7^{7}	3	[10]
(Australia) Ja Delaney (Australia) L Tu	6^{5}	6	[8]
(South Korea) J-s Nam (Japan) T Yuzuki	6	6
3	(Australia) B Bayldon (United States) R Stalder	2	2
(Chinese Taipei) Y-h Hsu (China) A Wang	5	2
2	(United States) V Kirkov (Netherlands) B Stevens	7	6

Semifinals
1	(Chinese Taipei) R Ho (Australia) MC Romios	6	6
4	(Israel) D Cukierman (United Kingdom) J Paris	3	2
(South Korea) J-s Nam (Japan) T Yuzuki	6^{1}	4
2	(United States) V Kirkov (Netherlands) B Stevens	7^{7}	6

Final
1	(Chinese Taipei) R Ho (Australia) MC Romios	6	6
2	(United States) V Kirkov (Netherlands) B Stevens	3	4
