= 2026 Guangzhou International Challenger =

- Date: 19 – 25 October
- Edition: 9th
- Surface: Hard
- Location: Guangzhou, China

Champions

Singles
- (Australia) Tristan Schoolkate

Doubles
- (Netherlands) Thijmen Loof / (Japan) Kaito Uesugi
- Guangzhou International Challenger

The 2026 Guangzhou International Challenger, known as the Guangzhou Nansha Challenger, was a professional tennis tournament played on hardcourts. It was the 9th edition of the tournament which was part of the 2026 ATP Challenger Tour. It took place in Guangzhou, China between 19 and 25 October 2026.

== Singles main-draw entrants ==
=== Seeds ===
| Country | Player | Rank^{1} | Seed |
|---|---|---|---|
| HKG | Coleman Wong | 101 | 1 |
| CHN | Wu Yibing | 113 | 2 |
| AUS | Tristan Schoolkate | 155 | 3 |
| CHN | Zhang Zhizhen | 166 | 4 |
| SWE | Elias Ymer | 192 | 5 |
| USA | Andre Ilagan | 194 | 6 |
| USA | Keegan Smith | 201 | 7 |
| GBR | Liam Broady | 213 | 8 |

^{1} Rankings are as of 5 October 2026.

=== Other entrants ===
The following players received wildcards into the singles main draw:

- (China) Cui Jie
- (China) Sun Qian
- (China) Te Rigele

The following player received entry into the singles main draw through the Next Gen Accelerator programme:

- (Serbia) Ognjen Milić

The following players received entry into the singles main draw as alternates:

- (Australia) Jake Delaney
- (Japan) Kaichi Uchida

The following players received entry from the qualifying draw:

- (Switzerland) Luca Castelnuovo
- Yaroslav Demin
- (Japan) Koki Matsuda
- (Czech Republic) Dominik Palán
- (Australia) Max Purcell
- (Uzbekistan) Khumoyun Sultanov

The following player received entry as a lucky loser:

- (Thailand) Kasidit Samrej

== Champions ==
=== Singles ===
- (Australia) Tristan Schoolkate def. (Hong Kong) Coleman Wong 4–6, 7–6^{(7–3)}, 6–4.

=== Doubles ===
- (Netherlands) Thijmen Loof / (Japan) Kaito Uesugi def. (Chinese Taipei) Hsu Yu-hsiou / (China) Sun Fajing 6–2, 6–2.
