= 2023 Guangzhou International Challenger =

- Date: 11–16 September
- Edition: 6th
- Surface: Hard
- Location: Guangzhou, China

Champions

Singles
- (France) Térence Atmane

Doubles
- (Switzerland) Antoine Bellier / (Switzerland) Luca Castelnuovo
← 2016 ·	Guangzhou International Challenger	· 2024 →

The 2023 Guangzhou International Challenger, known as the Guangzhou Nansha Challenger, was a professional tennis tournament played on hardcourts. It was the 6th edition of the tournament which was part of the 2023 ATP Challenger Tour. It took place in Guangzhou, China between 11 and 16 September 2023.

== Singles main-draw entrants ==
=== Seeds ===
Country	Player	Rank^{1}	Seed
AUS	Christopher O'Connell	69	1
AUS	Marc Polmans	174	2
CHN	Shang Juncheng	178	3
CHN	Bu Yunchaokete	214	4
FRA	Térence Atmane	218	5
JPN	Rio Noguchi	251	6
	Evgeny Donskoy	255	7
AUS	Li Tu	256	8

^{1} Rankings are as of 28 August 2023.

=== Other entrants ===
The following players received wildcards into the singles main draw:

- (China) Li Zhe
- (China) Mo Yecong
- (China) Mu Tao

The following player received entry into the singles main draw as an alternate:

- (France) Arthur Weber

The following players received entry from the qualifying draw:

- (Switzerland) Luca Castelnuovo
- Mikalai Haliak
- (India) Arjun Kadhe
- (China) Sun Qian
- (China) Wang Aoran
- (Chinese Taipei) Yin Bang-shuo

== Champions ==
=== Singles ===
- (France) Térence Atmane def. (Australia) Marc Polmans 4–6, 7–6^{(9–7)}, 6–4.

=== Doubles ===
- (Switzerland) Antoine Bellier / (Switzerland) Luca Castelnuovo def. (Chinese Taipei) Ray Ho / (Australia) Matthew Romios 6–3, 7–6^{(7–5)}.
