= 2023 Guangzhou International Challenger – Singles =

Singles
- 2023 Guangzhou International Challenger

Final
- Champion: (France) Térence Atmane
- Runner-up: (Australia) Marc Polmans
- Score: 4–6, 7–6^{(9–7)}, 6–4

Events
Singles	Doubles
- Guangzhou International Challenger

Nikoloz Basilashvili was the defending champion but chose not to defend his title.

Térence Atmane won the title after defeating Marc Polmans 4–6, 7–6^{(9–7)}, 6–4 in the final.

== Seeds ==
1. (Australia) Christopher O'Connell (quarterfinals)
2. (Australia) Marc Polmans (final)
3. (China) Shang Juncheng (second round, retired)
4. (China) Bu Yunchaokete (semifinals)
5. (France) Térence Atmane (champion)
6. (Japan) Rio Noguchi (second round)
7. Evgeny Donskoy (semifinals)
8. (Australia) Li Tu (quarterfinals)

== Draw ==
Key

- Q = Qualifier
- WC = Wild card
- LL = Lucky loser
- Alt = Alternate
- ITF = ITF entry
- PR = Protected ranking
- SR = Special ranking
- SE = Special exempt
- JE = Junior exempt
- JR = Junior Accelerator Programme entrant
- CO = College Accelerator Programme entrant
- NG = Next Gen Accelerator Program entrant
- w/o = Walkover
- r = Retired
- d = Defaulted

=== Finals ===
Semifinals
5	(France) Térence Atmane	6	6
4	(China) Bu Yunchaokete	3	4
7	Evgeny Donskoy	3	4
2	(Australia) Marc Polmans	6	6

Final
5	(France) Térence Atmane	4	7^{9}	6
2	(Australia) Marc Polmans	6	6^{7}	4

=== Top half ===
First round
1	(Australia) C O'Connell	7^{8}	6
(Czech Republic) D Palán	6^{6}	2
(Poland) F Peliwo	6^{3}	1
Q	(India) A Kadhe	7^{7}	6
WC	(China) Y Mo	3	3
(United States) A Ayeni	6	6
(Italy) L Giustino	0	6	3
5	(France) T Atmane	6	4	6
4	(China) Y Bu	6	6
Q	(Chinese Taipei) Yin Bang-shuo	2	3
(Australia) L Saville	6	2	6
(Japan) H Moriya	3	6	4
Q	(China) Sun Qian	1	2
(Australia) D Sweeny	6	6
(United States) E Zhu	3	2
6	(Japan) R Noguchi	6	6

Second round
1	(Australia) C O'Connell	6	6
Q	(India) A Kadhe	4	2
(United States) A Ayeni	6^{2}	6^{1}
5	(France) T Atmane	7^{7}	7^{7}
4	(China) Y Bu	6	6
(Australia) L Saville	4	0
(Australia) D Sweeny	7^{7}	7
6	(Japan) R Noguchi	6^{1}	5

Quarterfinals
1	(Australia) C O'Connell	5	3
5	(France) T Atmane	7	6
4	(China) Y Bu	7	6
(Australia) D Sweeny	5	3

Semifinals
5	(France) T Atmane	6	6
4	(China) Y Bu	3	4

=== Bottom half ===
First round
7	E Donskoy	6	7^{7}
(Switzerland) A Bellier	4	6^{2}
A Kachmazov	6	6
WC	(China) Z Li	3	4
(Australia) A Bolt	7	2	6^{6}
(Australia) O Jasika	5	6	7^{8}
Q	Mikalai Haliak	7^{9}	1	2
3	(China) J Shang	6^{7}	6	6
8	(Australia) L Tu	6	2	6
(United States) N Chappell	1	6	2
WC	(China) Mu Tao	2	6	1
Q	(China) A Wang	6	1	6
Q	(Switzerland) L Castelnuovo	1	2
(Northern Mariana Islands) C Sinclair	6	6
Alt	(France) A Weber	6^{5}	5
2	(Australia) M Polmans	7^{7}	7

Second round
7	E Donskoy	6	4	6
A Kachmazov	2	6	2
(Australia) O Jasika	6	5
3	(China) J Shang	3	0^{r}
8	(Australia) L Tu	6^{4}	6	6
Q	(China) A Wang	7^{7}	2	3
(Northern Mariana Islands) C Sinclair	4	4
2	(Australia) M Polmans	6	6

Quarterfinals
7	E Donskoy	3	7^{7}	6
(Australia) O Jasika	6	6^{5}	2
8	(Australia) L Tu	3	4
2	(Australia) M Polmans	6	6

Semifinals
7	E Donskoy	3	4
2	(Australia) M Polmans	6	6
