= 2016 "GDD CUP" International Challenger Guangzhou – Doubles =

Doubles
- 2016 "GDD CUP" International Challenger Guangzhou

Final
- Champion: (Russia) Alexander Kudryavtsev (Ukraine) Denys Molchanov
- Runner-up: (Thailand) Sanchai Ratiwatana (Thailand) Sonchat Ratiwatana
- Score: 6–2, 6–2

Events
Singles	Doubles
- "GDD CUP" International Challenger Guangzhou

Daniel Muñoz de la Nava and Aleksandr Nedovyesov were the defending champions but they decided not to compete this year.

Alexander Kudryavtsev and Denys Molchanov won the title after defeating Sanchai and Sonchat Ratiwatana 6–2, 6–2 in the final.

== Seeds ==
1. (Thailand) Sanchai Ratiwatana / (Thailand) Sonchat Ratiwatana (final)
2. (Croatia) Dino Marcan / (Croatia) Franko Škugor (quarterfinals)
3. (China) Gong Maoxin / (Chinese Taipei) Yi Chu-huan (quarterfinals)
4. (China) Bai Yan / (Italy) Riccardo Ghedin (first round)

== Draw ==
Key

- Q = Qualifier
- WC = Wild card
- LL = Lucky loser
- Alt = Alternate
- ITF = ITF entry
- PR = Protected ranking
- SR = Special ranking
- SE = Special exempt
- JE = Junior exempt
- JR = Junior Accelerator Programme entrant
- CO = College Accelerator Programme entrant
- NG = Next Gen Accelerator Program entrant
- w/o = Walkover
- r = Retired
- d = Defaulted

=== Draw ===
First round
1	(Thailand) Sa Ratiwatana (Thailand) So Ratiwatana	6	6
(Spain) D Gimeno-Traver (Netherlands) M Vervoort	2	3
(India) Y Bhambri (India) S Myneni	6	6
(Chinese Taipei) T Chen (Japan) G Soeda	3	1
3	(China) M Gong (Chinese Taipei) C-h Yi	6	6
(China) Z Li (Australia) J Thompson	1	3
(Switzerland) M Chiudinelli (Japan) T Daniel	5	6	[13]
(Georgia (country)) N Basilashvili (Austria) M Neuchrist	7	2	[15]
(Germany) P Gojowczyk (Israel) D Sela	6^{3}	4
PR	(Czech Republic) R Jebavý (Slovakia) L Lacko	7^{7}	6
(Russia) A Kudryavtsev (Ukraine) D Molchanov	6	6
4/WC	(China) Y Bai (Italy) R Ghedin	2	2
WC	(Chinese Taipei) J Wang (China) Z Zhang	6	6
(Belgium) K Coppejans (Czech Republic) A Pavlásek	1	1
WC	(Turkey) A Çelikbilek (Ukraine) A Smirnov	2	2
2	(Croatia) D Marcan (Croatia) F Škugor	6	6

Quarterfinals
1	(Thailand) Sa Ratiwatana (Thailand) So Ratiwatana	w/o
(India) Y Bhambri (India) S Myneni
3	(China) M Gong (Chinese Taipei) C-h Yi	6^{1}	4
(Georgia (country)) N Basilashvili (Austria) M Neuchrist	7^{7}	6
PR	(Czech Republic) R Jebavý (Slovakia) L Lacko	3	6^{4}
(Russia) A Kudryavtsev (Ukraine) D Molchanov	6	7^{7}
WC	(Chinese Taipei) J Wang (China) Z Zhang	4	7^{7}	[10]
2	(Croatia) D Marcan (Croatia) F Škugor	6	6^{5}	[6]

Semifinals
1	(Thailand) Sa Ratiwatana (Thailand) So Ratiwatana	w/o
(Georgia (country)) N Basilashvili (Austria) M Neuchrist
(Russia) A Kudryavtsev (Ukraine) D Molchanov	6	6
WC	(Chinese Taipei) J Wang (China) Z Zhang	2	1

Final
1	(Thailand) Sa Ratiwatana (Thailand) So Ratiwatana	2	2
(Russia) A Kudryavtsev (Ukraine) D Molchanov	6	6
