= 2015 China International Guangzhou =

Tennis tournament

- Date: 9 – 15 March
- Edition: 4th
- Draw: 32S / 16D
- Prize money: $50,000+H
- Surface: Hard
- Location: Guangzhou, China

Champions

Singles
- (Belgium) Kimmer Coppejans

Doubles
- (Spain) Daniel Muñoz de la Nava / (Kazakhstan) Aleksandr Nedovyesov
- China International Guangzhou

The 2015 China International Guangzhou was a professional tennis tournament played on hard courts. It was the 4th edition of the tournament which was part of the 2015 ATP Challenger Tour. It took place in Guangzhou, China between 9 and 15 March 2015.

== Singles main draw entrants ==
=== Seeds ===
Country	Player	Rank^{1}	Seed
SLO	Blaž Kavčič	110	1
KOR	Chung Hyeon	121	2
KAZ	Aleksandr Nedovyesov	130	3
RUS	Alexander Kudryavtsev	131	4
AUS	John Millman	137	5
JPN	Yūichi Sugita	148	6
JPN	Hiroki Moriya	156	7
ESP	Roberto Carballés Baena	160	8

- ^{1} Rankings are as of March 2, 2015

=== Other entrants ===
The following players received wildcards into the singles main draw:

- (China) Zheng Weiqiang
- (China) Wu Di
- (China) Li Zhe
- (China) Wang Chuhan

The following players received entry from the qualifying draw:

- (Japan) Yusuke Watanuki
- (Netherlands) Matwé Middelkoop
- (Italy) Riccardo Ghedin
- (Germany) Richard Becker

== Champions ==
=== Singles ===
- (Belgium) Kimmer Coppejans def. (Italy) Roberto Marcora, 7–6^{(8–6)}, 5–7, 6–1

=== Doubles ===
- (Spain) Daniel Muñoz de la Nava / (Kazakhstan) Aleksandr Nedovyesov def. (France) Fabrice Martin / (India) Purav Raja, 6–2, 7–5
