= Uladzimir Ignatik =

Belarusian tennis player

Uładzimir Ihnatsik Уладзімір Ігнацік
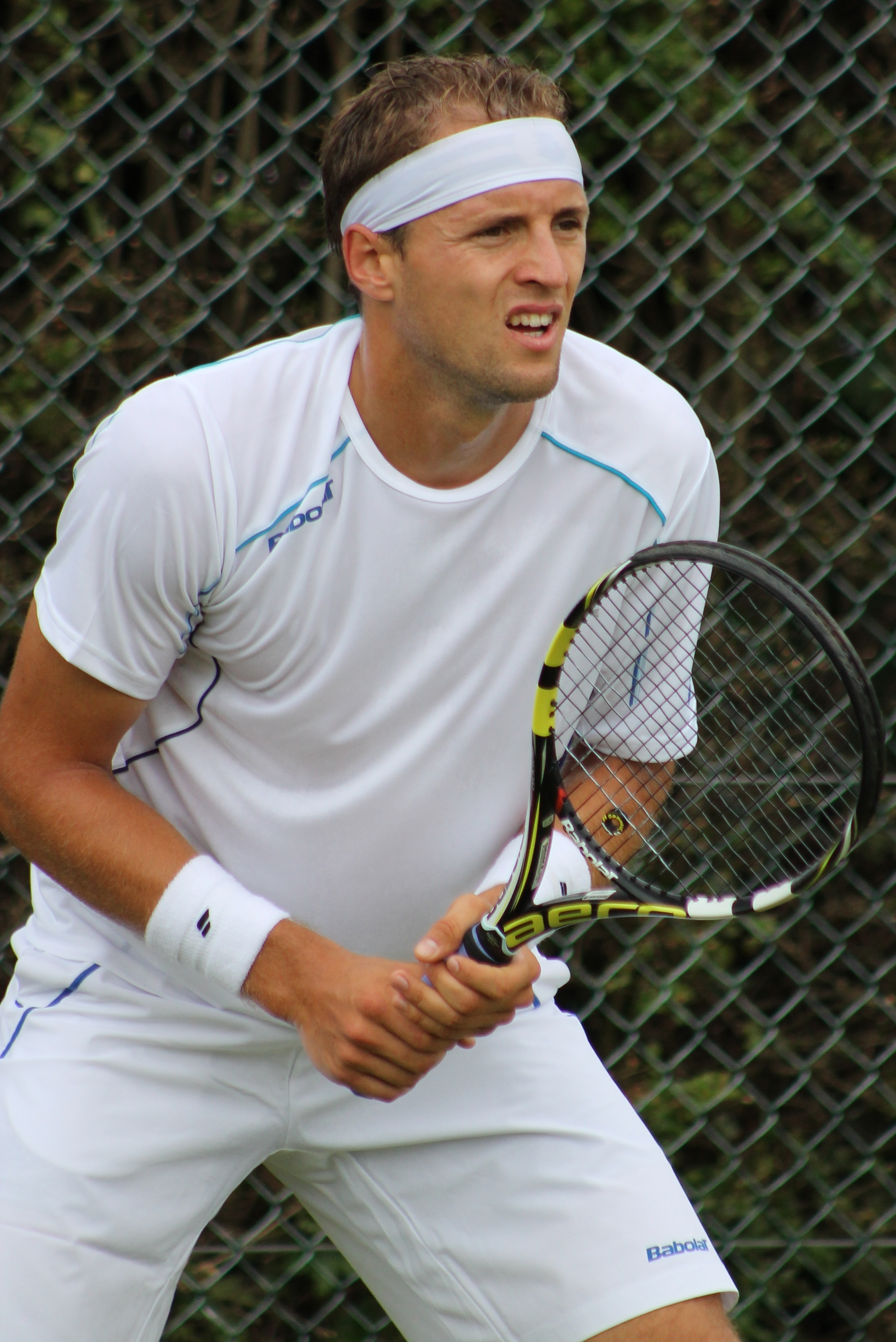
- Country (sports): Belarus
- Residence: Minsk, Belarus
- Born: 14 July 1990 (age 36) Minsk, Byelorussian SSR, Soviet Union
- Height: 1.83 m (6 ft 0 in)
- Turned pro: 2007
- Plays: Right-handed (two-handed backhand)
- Coach: Jan Stancik, Erik Csarnakovics
- Prize money: US $708,746

Singles
- Career record: 13–16 (at ATP Tour level, Grand Slam level, and in Davis Cup)
- Career titles: 0
- Highest ranking: No. 129 (19 June 2017)
- Current ranking: No. 1,297 (10 August 2026)

Grand Slam singles results
- Australian Open: Q2 (2017)
- French Open: Q2 (2008, 2014, 2017, 2018, 2019)
- Wimbledon: Q2 (2011, 2014, 2016)
- US Open: Q3 (2018)

Doubles
- Career record: 3-1 (at ATP Tour level, Grand Slam level, and in Davis Cup)
- Career titles: 0
- Highest ranking: No. 117 (19 November 2012)
- Current ranking: No. 1,291 (10 August 2026)

Team competitions
- Davis Cup: 17–16
- Last updated on: 21 August 2026.

Uładzimir Iharavich Ihnatsik (Belarusian: Уладзімір Ігаравіч Ігнацік); or Vladimir Igorevich Ignatik (Russian: Владимир Игоревич Игнатик); born 14 July 1990 in Belarus, is a Belarusian professional tennis player. He has a career-high ATP singles ranking of No. 129 achieved on 19 June 2017 and a doubles ranking of No. 117 reached on 19 November 2012.

== Professional career ==
=== Junior career ===
Igantik was ranked the No. 1 junior in the world in June 2007 after winning the boys' singles title at 2007 Roland Garros, and later finished runner-up at the 2007 Wimbledon Championships. Then as the top seed, Ignatik lost in the quarterfinals of the 2007 US Open.

=== Early career ===
Ignatik gained ATP points mainly by playing in Futures tournaments. He finished 2007 ranked 864 in the world, and 2008 ranked 431 in the world. Ignatik played his first two rubbers for Belarus in Davis Cup in 2008, at the age of 17, against Switzerland, losing in four sets to the top 20 player Stanislas Wawrinka, as well as losing a dead rubber to Yves Allegro in two sets. Ignatik got his first two wins in his next fixture against Georgia, defeating Lado Chikhladze in three sets, and Nodar Itonishvili in a dead rubber.

=== 2009 ===
Ignatik continued to play Futures in 2009. In May 2009, Ignatik retired in his first rubber against South Africa, which Belarus would go on to lose 5–0. In June Ignatik won his first Futures tournament in Poland. In August Ignatik hit a rich vein of form, reaching the final in a Futures in Serbia, followed by a win two weeks later in Poland. Two weeks later he won another Futures in Turkey, and the following week he won another in Spain. After this win Ignatik was ranked within the top 300, and began to participate in Challenger level tournaments.

In November, Ignatik got back-to-back quarter-finals in Jersey and Yokohama, before winning his first Challenger in Tokyo at the end of the month. He finished the year ranked No. 192 in the world.

=== 2010 ===
Ignatik began the year playing in the Futures circuit again, making it to the finals in one Futures tournament in Britain. After this, he went back to playing in the Challenger tour, but as of May, hadn't made it to the quarterfinals of any of these tournaments. In the Davis Cup, Ignatik lost both of his singles rubbers in a tie against Italy.

=== 2011 ===
Ignatik won his second Challenger in Guangzhou defeating Alexandre Kudryavtsev in the final.

=== 2012 ===
He won his third Challenger in Tashkent defeating Lukáš Lacko in the final.

== ATP Challenger and ITF Futures finals ==
=== Singles: 33 (23–10) ===
Legend ATP Challenger (5–2) ITF Futures (18–8)	Finals by surface Hard (10–5) Clay (11–3) Grass (0–0) Carpet (2–2)

Result	W–L	Date	Tournament	Tier	Surface	Opponent	Score
Win	1–0	Jan 2008	USA F2, Miami	Futures	Hard	(United States) Todd Paul	4–6, 7–6^{(10–8)}, 6–2
Loss	1–1	May 2008	Spain F18, Vic	Futures	Clay	(Spain) Javier Genaro-Martinez	4–6, 5–7
Win	2–1	Jun 2008	Belarus F1, Minsk	Futures	Hard	(Latvia) Deniss Pavlovs	6–1, 2–0, ret.
Loss	2–2	Mar 2009	USA F5, Harlingen	Futures	Hard	(United States) Jesse Witten	5–7, 4–6
Win	3–2	Jun 2009	Poland F3, Koszalin	Futures	Clay	(Poland) Marcin Gawron	6–1, 4–6, 6–2
Loss	3–3	Aug 2009	Serbia F4, Novi Sad	Futures	Clay	(Serbia) Dejan Katic	6–3, 3–6, 2–6
Win	4–3	Aug 2009	Poland F4, Olsztyn	Futures	Clay	(Poland) Marcin Gawron	6–1, 6–3
Win	5–3	Sep 2009	Turkey F9, Istanbul	Futures	Hard	(Ukraine) Denys Molchanov	6–2, 6–2
Win	6–3	Oct 2009	Spain F33, Martos	Futures	Hard	(Spain) Roberto Bautista Agut	6–1, 3–6, 7–6^{(7–3)}
Win	7–3	Nov 2009	Toyota, Japan	Challenger	Carpet	(Japan) Tatsuma Ito	7–6^{(9–7)}, 7–6^{(7–3)}
Loss	7–4	Jan 2010	Great Britain F2, Sheffield	Futures	Hard	(Italy) Stefano Galvani	4–6, 6–4, 0–6
Win	8–4	Mar 2011	Guangzhou, China	Challenger	Hard	(Russia) Alexander Kudryavtsev	6–4, 6–4
Loss	8–5	Apr 2012	Uzbekistan F1, Namangan	Futures	Hard	(Ukraine) Ivan Sergeyev	6–7^{(5–7)}, 1–6
Win	9–5	Jul 2012	Germany F8, Kassel	Futures	Clay	(Czech Republic) Jan Minář	6–4, 7–6^{(7–3)}
Win	10–5	Oct 2012	Tashkent, Uzbekistan	Challenger	Hard	(Slovakia) Lukáš Lacko	6–3, 7–6^{(7–3)}
Win	11–5	Nov 2013	Czech Republic F6, Jablonec nad Nisou	Futures	Carpet	(Slovakia) Karol Beck	6–2, 6–3
Loss	11–6	Dec 2013	Czech Republic F7, Opava	Futures	Carpet	(Lithuania) Laurynas Grigelis	6–4, 3–6, 6–7^{(2–7)}
Win	12–6	Jan 2014	Germany F2, Stuttgart	Futures	Hard	(Slovakia) Karol Beck	4–6, 6–3, 7–6^{(7–3)}
Win	13–6	Feb 2014	Croatia F2, Zagreb	Futures	Hard	(Croatia) Nikola Mektić	5–7, 6–3, 6–3
Win	14–6	Mar 2014	Croatia F3, Vrsar	Futures	Clay	(France) Tak Khunn Wang	6–2, 6–4
Loss	14–7	Jan 2015	Germany F2, Stuttgart	Futures	Hard	(Germany) Maximilian Marterer	4–6, 6–4, 5–7
Win	15–7	May 2015	Czech Republic F1, Prague	Futures	Clay	(Czech Republic) Jan Mertl	6–1, 6–3
Loss	15–8	May 2015	Czech Republic F2, Jablonec nad Nisou	Futures	Clay	(Czech Republic) Marek Michalička	6–7^{(4–7)}, 5–7
Win	16–8	Jul 2015	Czech Republic F6, Brno	Futures	Clay	(Czech Republic) Jan Mertl	6–7^{(9–11)}, 6–4, 6–1
Win	17–8	Aug 2015	Slovakia F3, Piešťany	Futures	Clay	(Slovakia) Filip Horanský	6–3, 7–5
Win	18–8	Feb 2016	Switzerland F1, Oberentfelden	Futures	Carpet	(Germany) Jan Choinski	6–4, 6–3
Win	19–8	Jul 2016	Czech Republic F5, Ústí nad Orlicí	Futures	Clay	(Poland) Pawel Cias	6–1, 6–4
Loss	19–9	Jul 2016	Prague, Czech Republic	Challenger	Clay	(Colombia) Santiago Giraldo	4–6, 6–3, 6–7^{(2–7)}
Win	20–9	Aug 2016	Slovakia F2, Piešťany	Futures	Clay	(Czech Republic) Pavel Nejedly	6–0, 6–1
Loss	20–10	Sep 2016	Meknes, Morocco	Challenger	Clay	(Germany) Maximilian Marterer	6–7^{(3–7)}, 3–6
Win	21–10	Jan 2017	Rennes, France	Challenger	Hard	(Russia) Andrey Rublev	6–7^{(6–8)}, 6–3, 7–6^{(7–5)}
Win	22–10	Nov 2017	Andria, Italy	Challenger	Hard	(Belgium) Christopher Heyman	6–7^{(3–7)}, 6–4, 7–6^{(7–3)}
Win	23–10	Oct 2020	M25 Pardubice, Czech Republic	World Tennis Tour	Clay	(Czech Republic) Jan Satral	6–3, 6–2

=== Doubles: 26 (10–16) ===
Legend ATP Challenger (4–9) ITF Futures (6–7)	Finals by surface Hard (4–6) Clay (4–8) Grass (0–0) Carpet (2–2)

Result	W–L	Date	Tournament	Tier	Surface	Partner	Opponents	Score
Win	1–0	Jan 2008	USA F3, Baton Rouge	Futures	Hard	(Russia) Andrey Kumantsov	(United States) Brian Battistone (United States) Dann Battistone	7–5, 6–4
Loss	1–1	Mar 2008	USA F6, McAllen	Futures	Hard	(United States) Adam El Mihdawy	(Lithuania) Ričardas Berankis (Belarus) Sergey Betov	3–6, 3–6
Win	2–1	Jan 2009	USA F1, Boca Raton	Futures	Clay	(Armenia) Tigran Martirosyan	(Canada) Milan Pokrajac (Serbia) Aleksander Slovic	6–4, 6–7^{(4–7)}, [10–7]
Loss	2–2	May 2009	Poland F2, Kraków	Futures	Clay	(Ukraine) Denys Molchanov	(Germany) Martin Emmrich (Chile) Hans Podlipnik-Castillo	4–6, 6–7^{(5–7)}
Loss	2–3	Oct 2009	Great Britain F15, Glasgow	Futures	Hard	(United Kingdom) Daniel Cox	(United Kingdom) Chris Eaton (United Kingdom) Dominic Inglot	0–6, 6–7^{(5–7)}
Loss	2–4	Feb 2010	Tanger, Morocco	Challenger	Clay	(Slovakia) Martin Kližan	(Belgium) Steve Darcis (Germany) Dominik Meffert	7–5, 5–7, [7–10]
Loss	2–5	Mar 2010	Caltanissetta, Italy	Challenger	Clay	(Slovakia) Martin Kližan	(Spain) David Marrero (Spain) Santiago Ventura	6–7^{(3–7)}, 4–6
Win	3–5	Apr 2010	Saint-Brieuc, France	Challenger	Clay	(Spain) David Marrero	(United States) Brian Battistone (United States) Ryler DeHeart	4–6, 6–4, [10–5]
Loss	3–6	Aug 2010	Salvador, Brazil	Challenger	Hard	(Slovakia) Martin Kližan	(Brazil) Franco Ferreiro (Brazil) André Sá	2–6, 4–6
Loss	3–7	Jan 2011	Brazil F1, São Paulo	Futures	Hard	(Italy) Thomas Fabbiano	(Brazil) Franco Ferreiro (Brazil) André Ghem	7–6^{(7–3)}, 4–6, [3–10]
Loss	3–8	Jul 2011	Turin, Italy	Challenger	Clay	(Slovakia) Martin Kližan	(Austria) Martin Fischer (Austria) Philipp Oswald	3–6, 4–6
Win	4–8	Feb 2012	Wolfsburg, Germany	Challenger	Carpet	(Lithuania) Laurynas Grigelis	(Poland) Tomasz Bednarek (France) Olivier Charroin	7–5, 4–6, [10–5]
Win	5–8	Mar 2012	Cherbourg, France	Challenger	Hard	(Lithuania) Laurynas Grigelis	(Germany) Dustin Brown (United Kingdom) Jonathan Marray	4–6, 7–6^{(11–9)}, [10–0]
Win	6–8	Apr 2012	Uzbekistan F2, Andijan	Futures	Hard	(Latvia) Deniss Pavlovs	(Ukraine) Vladyslav Manafov (Belarus) Yaraslav Shyla	6–4, 6–2
Loss	6–9	Jun 2012	Košice, Slovakia	Challenger	Clay	(Belarus) Andrei Vasilevski	(Poland) Tomasz Bednarek (Poland) Mateusz Kowalczyk	2–6, 7–5, [12–14]
Win	7–9	Sep 2012	Saint-Rémy-de-Provence, France	Challenger	Hard	(Lithuania) Laurynas Grigelis	(Spain) Jordi Marse-Vidri (Spain) C. Poch Gradin	6–7^{(4–7)}, 6–3, [10–6]
Loss	7–10	Nov 2012	Helsinki, Finland	Challenger	Hard	(Chinese Taipei) Jimmy Wang	(Russia) Mikhail Elgin (Slovakia) Igor Zelenay	6–4, 6–7^{(0–7)}, [4–10]
Loss	7–11	Aug 2013	Segovia, Spain	Challenger	Hard	(Russia) Mikhail Elgin	(United Kingdom) Ken Skupski (United Kingdom) Neal Skupski	3–6, 7–6^{(7–4)}, [6–10]
Loss	7–12	Jan 2014	Germany F3, Kaarst	Futures	Carpet	(Bulgaria) Dimitar Kutrovsky	(Georgia (country)) Nikoloz Basilashvili (Belarus) Aliaksandr Bury	6–4, 4–6, [6–10]
Loss	7–13	May 2014	Czech Republic F3, Most	Futures	Clay	(Czech Republic) Dominik Kellovský	(Czech Republic) Roman Jebavý (Czech Republic) Jan Šátral	4–6, 6–4, [5–10]
Win	8–13	Jul 2014	Czech Republic F6, Brno	Futures	Clay	(Czech Republic) Roman Jebavý	(Czech Republic) Dušan Lojda (Czech Republic) Václav Šafránek	6–1, 6–4
Loss	8–14	Jan 2016	Germany F3, Nußloch	Futures	Carpet	(Belgium) Niels Desein	(Germany) Johannes Härteis (Germany) Kevin Krawietz	7–6^{(7–5)}, 4–6, [8–10]
Win	9–14	Feb 2016	Switzerland F2, Trimbach	Futures	Carpet	(Slovakia) Adrian Sikora	(Germany) Johannes Härteis (Germany) Kevin Krawietz	6–4, 5–7, [10–7]
Loss	9–15	Sep 2016	Kenitra, Morocco	Challenger	Clay	(Austria) Michael Linzer	(Germany) Kevin Krawietz (Germany) Maximilian Marterer	6–7^{(6–8)}, 6–4, [6–10]
Loss	9–16	Apr 2017	Sophia Antipolis, France	Challenger	Clay	(Slovakia) Jozef Kovalík	(France) Tristan Lamasine (Croatia) Franko Škugor	2–6, 2–6
Win	10–16	Sep 2020	M25 Jablonec nad Nisou, Czech Republic	World Tennis Tour	Clay	(Slovakia) Lukas Klein	(Czech Republic) Filip Duda (Czech Republic) Petr Nouza	6–3, 7–6^{(7–4)}

=== Junior Grand Slam Finals ===
==== Singles: 2 (1 title, 1 runner-up) ====
Result	Year	Tournament	Surface	Opponent	Score
Win	2007	French Open	Clay	(Australia) Greg Jones	6–3, 6–4
Loss	2007	Wimbledon	Grass	(United States) Donald Young	5–7, 1–6

== Singles performance timeline ==
Key
W	F	SF	QF	#R	RR	Q#	DNQ	A	NH

(W) winner; (F) finalist; (SF) semifinalist; (QF) quarterfinalist; (#R) rounds 4, 3, 2, 1; (RR) round-robin stage; (Q#) qualification round; (DNQ) did not qualify; (A) absent; (NH) not held; (SR) strike rate (events won / competed); (W–L) win–loss record.
To avoid confusion and double counting, these charts are updated at the conclusion of a tournament or when the player's participation has ended.

Tournament	2008	2009	2010	2011	2012	2013	2014	2015	2016	2017	2018	2019	2020	2021	SR	W–L
Grand Slam tournaments
Australian Open	A	A	A	A	Q1	Q1	A	A	Q1	Q2	Q1	A	A	A	0 / 0	0–0
French Open	Q2	A	Q1	Q1	A	Q1	Q2	A	Q1	Q2	Q2	Q2	A		0 / 0	0–0
Wimbledon	A	A	A	Q2	A	Q1	Q2	A	Q2	A	Q1	A	NH		0 / 0	0–0
US Open	A	A	Q2	A	Q1	Q1	Q1	Q2	Q2	Q2	Q3	A	A		0 / 0	0–0
Win–loss	0–0	0–0	0–0	0–0	0–0	0–0	0–0	0–0	0–0	0–0	0–0	0–0	0–0	0–0	0 / 0	0–0
