= Sanchai Ratiwatana =

Thai tennis player

Sanchai Ratiwatana สรรค์ชัย รติวัฒน์
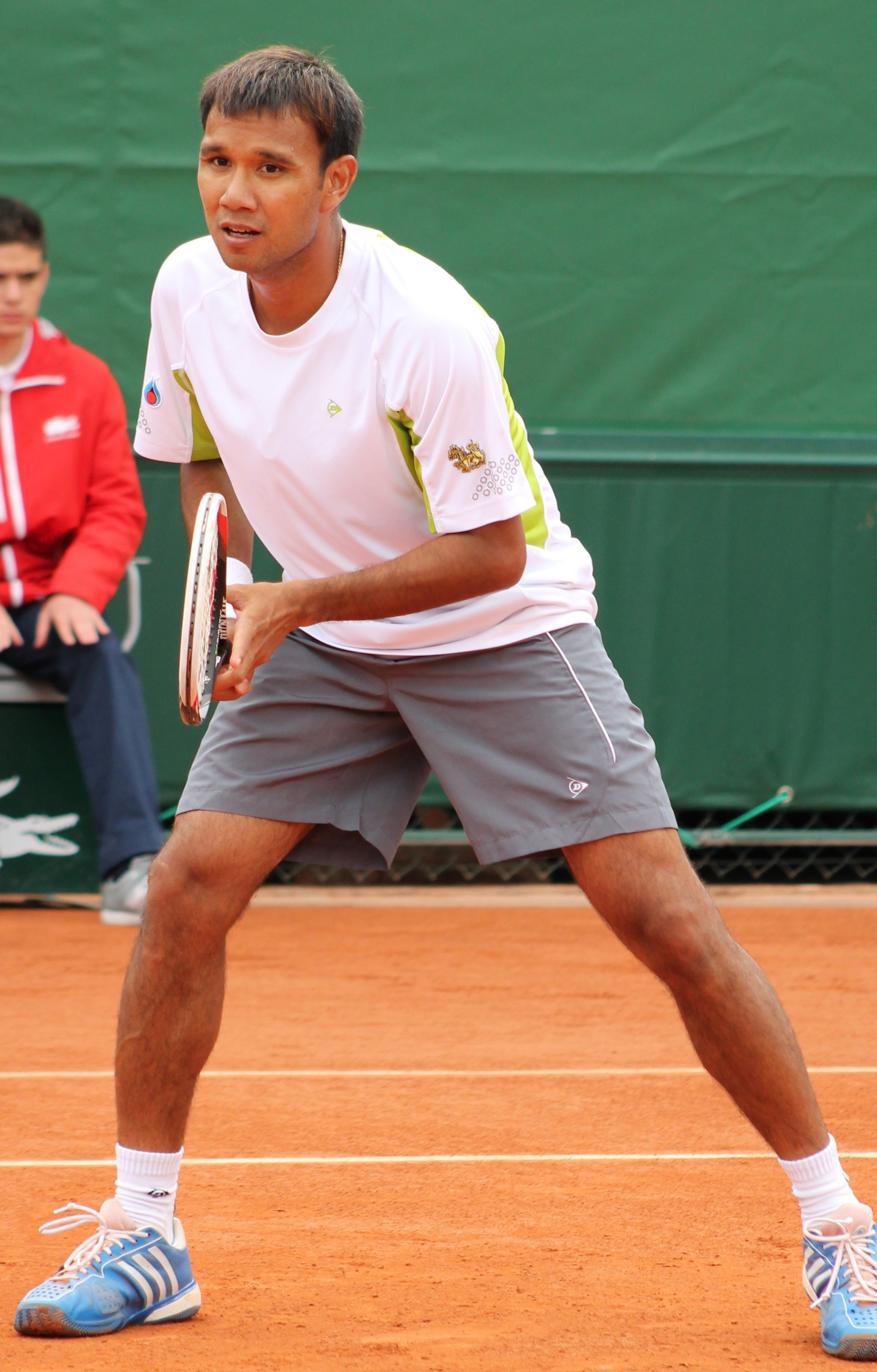
- Sanchai Ratiwatana at Roland Garros 2013
- Country (sports): Thailand
- Residence: Bangkok, Thailand
- Born: 23 January 1982 (age 44) Bangkok, Thailand
- Height: 1.75 m (5 ft 9 in)
- Turned pro: 2004
- Retired: 2020
- Plays: Right-handed (one-handed backhand)
- Coach: Chatchai Ratiwatana
- Prize money: US $503,479

Singles
- Career record: 3–6
- Highest ranking: No. 831 (26 November 2007)

Doubles
- Career record: 62–78
- Career titles: 2
- Highest ranking: No. 39 (28 April 2008)

Grand Slam doubles results
- Australian Open: 1R (2008, 2011, 2013, 2018)
- French Open: 1R (2008, 2013)
- Wimbledon: 3R (2010)
- US Open: 1R (2008, 2012)

Other doubles tournaments
- Olympic Games: 1R (2016)

Grand Slam mixed doubles results
- Wimbledon: 1R (2008)
Medal record
Men's Tennis
Representing Thailand
Universiade
Gold medal – first place	2007 Bangkok	Doubles
Bronze medal – third place	2003 Daegu	Doubles
Asian Games
Silver medal – second place	2006 Doha	Doubles
Bronze medal – third place	2006 Doha	Team
Bronze medal – third place	2010 Guangzhou	Mixed doubles
Bronze medal – third place	2014 Incheon	Doubles
Southeast Asian Games
Gold medal – first place	2003 Vietnam	Doubles
Gold medal – first place	2005 Manila	Doubles
Gold medal – first place	2007 Nakhon Ratchasima	Doubles
Gold medal – first place	2007 Nakhon Ratchasima	Mixed doubles
Gold medal – first place	2007 Nakhon Ratchasima	Team
Gold medal – first place	2009 Vientiane	Doubles
Gold medal – first place	2015 Singapore	Doubles
Gold medal – first place	2015 Singapore	Team
Gold medal – first place	2017 Kuala Lumpur	Doubles
Gold medal – first place	2017 Kuala Lumpur	Mixed doubles
Silver medal – second place	2003 Vietnam	Team
Silver medal – second place	2009 Vientiane	Mixed doubles
Silver medal – second place	2009 Vientiane	Team
Silver medal – second place	2019 Philippines	Mixed doubles
Bronze medal – third place	2005 Manila	Mixed doubles
Bronze medal – third place	2005 Manila	Team
Bronze medal – third place	2011 Jakarta-Palembang	Mixed doubles
Bronze medal – third place	2011 Jakarta-Palembang	Team
Bronze medal – third place	2015 Singapore	Mixed doubles

Sanchai Ratiwatana (Thai: สรรค์ชัย รติวัฒน์, pronounced [sǎn.t͡ɕʰāj rá(ʔ).tī.wát]), nicknamed Tong (ต้อง, [tɔ̂ŋ]; born 23 January 1982), is a former professional tennis player from Thailand. He turned professional in 2004.

In 2007, Sanchai and his twin brother Sonchat Ratiwatana won their first ATP doubles title in Bangkok. They won their second title at the Chennai Open in India in 2008.

He reached World No. 39, his best doubles ranking, on 28 April 2008.

== ATP career finals ==
=== Doubles: 3 (2 titles, 1 runner-up) ===
Legend Grand Slam tournaments (0–0) ATP World Tour Finals (0–0) ATP World Tour Masters 1000 (0–0) ATP World Tour 500 Series (0–1) ATP World Tour 250 Series (2–0)	Titles by surface Hard (2–1) Clay (0–0) Grass (0–0)	Titles by setting Outdoor (1–0) Indoor (1–1)

Result	W–L	Date	Tournament	Tier	Surface	Partner	Opponents	Score
Win	1–0	Sep 2007	Thailand Open, Thailand	International	Hard (i)	(Thailand) Sonchat Ratiwatana	(France) Michaël Llodra (France) Nicolas Mahut	3–6, 7–5, [10–7]
Win	2–0	Jan 2008	Chennai Open, India	International	Hard	(Thailand) Sonchat Ratiwatana	(Cyprus) Marcos Baghdatis (France) Marc Gicquel	6–4, 7–5
Loss	2–1	Feb 2008	U.S. National Indoor Tennis Championships, US	Intl. Gold	Hard (i)	(Thailand) Sonchat Ratiwatana	(India) Mahesh Bhupathi (The Bahamas) Mark Knowles	6–7^{(5–7)}, 2–6

== ATP Challenger Tour finals ==
=== Doubles: 81 (48–33) ===
Result	W–L	Date	Tournament	Surface	Partner	Opponents	Score
Win	1–0	Oct 2003	Dharwad, India	Hard	(Thailand) Sonchat Ratiwatana	(India) Prakash Amritraj (South Africa) Rik de Voest	3–6, 6–3, 7–5
Win	2–0	Apr 2004	Busan, South Korea	Hard	(Thailand) Sonchat Ratiwatana	(Japan) Satoshi Iwabuchi (Japan) Tasuku Iwami	6–7^{(5–7)}, 7–6^{(7–1)}, 6–4
Win	3–0	Aug 2004	Belo Horizonte, Brazil	Hard	(Thailand) Sonchat Ratiwatana	(Brazil) Marcos Daniel (Peru) Iván Miranda	6–2, 7–5
Win	4–0	Nov 2004	Reunion Island, Réunion	Hard	(Thailand) Sonchat Ratiwatana	(Switzerland) Michel Kratochvil (Czech Republic) Jiří Vaněk	w/o
Loss	4–1	Jan 2005	Waikoloa, United States	Hard	(Thailand) Sonchat Ratiwatana	(Brazil) André Sá (United States) Eric Taino	6–7^{(2–7)}, 6–3, 6–7^{(2–7)}
Win	5–1	Feb 2005	Cherbourg, France	Hard(i)	(Thailand) Sonchat Ratiwatana	(France) Jean-Christophe Faurel (France) Nicolas Renavand	6–3, 6–2
Loss	5–2	Nov 2005	Busan, South Korea	Hard	(Thailand) Sonchat Ratiwatana	(Australia) Ashley Fisher (United States) Tripp Phillips	5–7, 3–6
Loss	5–3	Mar 2006	Cherbourg, France	Hard(i)	(Thailand) Sonchat Ratiwatana	(France) Jean-François Bachelot (France) Stéphane Robert	6–7^{(5–7)}, 3–6
Win	6–3	Apr 2006	Chikmagalur, India	Hard	(Thailand) Sonchat Ratiwatana	(Chinese Taipei) Lu Yen-hsun (Thailand) Danai Udomchoke	6–3, 6–2
Loss	6–4	Apr 2006	Dharwad, India	Hard	(Thailand) Sonchat Ratiwatana	(Slovakia) Kamil Čapkovič (Slovakia) Lukáš Lacko	3–6, 5–7
Win	7–4	May 2006	Fergana, Uzbekistan	Hard	(Thailand) Sonchat Ratiwatana	(Kazakhstan) Alexey Kedryuk (Ukraine) Orest Tereshchuk	6–7^{(7–9)}, 7–6^{(7–3)}, [14–12]
Win	8–4	Jul 2006	Lexington, United States	Hard	(Thailand) Sonchat Ratiwatana	(United States) John Isner (United States) Colin Purcell	7–6^{(7–5)}, 4–6, [10–6]
Loss	8–5	Nov 2006	Busan, South Korea	Hard	(Thailand) Sonchat Ratiwatana	(Austria) Alexander Peya (Germany) Björn Phau	7–6^{(7–3)}, 3–6, [6–10]
Win	9–5	Mar 2007	Kyoto, Japan	Carpet(i)	(Thailand) Sonchat Ratiwatana	(United States) Rajeev Ram (United States) Bobby Reynolds	6–4, 6–3
Win	10–5	May 2007	San Remo, Italy	Clay	(Thailand) Sonchat Ratiwatana	(Belgium) Steve Darcis (Belgium) Stefan Wauters	7–6^{(7–3)}, 6–3
Win	11–5	Jun 2007	Lugano, Switzerland	Clay	(Thailand) Sonchat Ratiwatana	(Switzerland) Jean-Claude Scherrer (Croatia) Lovro Zovko	6–4, 6–4
Win	12–5	Jul 2007	Granby, Canada	Hard	(Thailand) Sonchat Ratiwatana	(Japan) Satoshi Iwabuchi (United States) Philip Stolt	6–2, 7–6^{(7–4)}
Loss	12–6	Oct 2007	Seoul, South Korea	Hard	(Thailand) Sonchat Ratiwatana	(South Africa) Rik de Voest (Chinese Taipei) Lu Yen-hsun	3–6, 5–7
Loss	12–7	Oct 2008	Seoul, South Korea	Hard	(Thailand) Sonchat Ratiwatana	(Poland) Łukasz Kubot (Austria) Oliver Marach	5–7, 6–4, [6–10]
Win	13–7	Jan 2009	Salinas, Ecuador	Hard	(Thailand) Sonchat Ratiwatana	(Argentina) Juan Pablo Brzezicki (Peru) Iván Miranda	6–3, 7–6^{(7–5)}
Win	14–7	Feb 2009	Wrocław, Poland	Hard(i)	(Thailand) Sonchat Ratiwatana	(Germany) Benedikt Dorsch (United States) Sam Warburg	6–4, 3–6, [10–8]
Win	15–7	Mar 2009	Melbourne, Australia	Hard	(Thailand) Sonchat Ratiwatana	(Chinese Taipei) Chen Ti (Thailand) Danai Udomchoke	7–6^{(7–5)}, 5–7, [10–7]
Loss	15–8	Mar 2009	Khorat, Thailand	Hard	(Thailand) Sonchat Ratiwatana	(India) Rohan Bopanna (Pakistan) Aisam-ul-Haq Qureshi	6–3, 6–7^{(5–7)}, [5–10]
Win	16–8	Apr 2009	Mexico City, Mexico	Hard	(Thailand) Sonchat Ratiwatana	(Dominican Republic) Víctor Estrella Burgos (Brazil) João Souza	6–3, 6–3
Win	17–8	May 2009	Busan, South Korea	Hard	(Thailand) Sonchat Ratiwatana	(Japan) Tasuku Iwami (Japan) Toshihide Matsui	6–4, 6–2
Loss	17–9	Jul 2009	Aptos, United States	Hard	(Thailand) Sonchat Ratiwatana	(Australia) Carsten Ball (Australia) Chris Guccione	3–6, 2–6
Loss	17–10	Nov 2009	Seoul, South Korea	Hard	(Thailand) Sonchat Ratiwatana	(South Africa) Rik de Voest (Chinese Taipei) Lu Yen-hsun	6–7^{(5–7)}, 6–3, [6–10]
Loss	17–11	Dec 2009	Salzburg, Austria	Hard(i)	(Thailand) Sonchat Ratiwatana	(Germany) Philipp Marx (Slovakia) Igor Zelenay	4–6, 5–7
Loss	17–12	Jan 2010	Salinas, Ecuador	Hard	(Thailand) Sonchat Ratiwatana	(United Kingdom) Jonathan Marray (United Kingdom) Jamie Murray	3–6, 4–6
Win	18–12	Jan 2010	Heilbronn, Germany	Hard(i)	(Thailand) Sonchat Ratiwatana	(Croatia) Mario Ančić (Croatia) Lovro Zovko	6–4, 7–5
Loss	18–13	Aug 2010	Granby, Canada	Hard	(Thailand) Sonchat Ratiwatana	(Denmark) Frederik Nielsen (Australia) Joseph Sirianni	6–4, 4–6, [6–10]
Win	19–13	Sep 2010	Bangkok, Thailand	Hard	(Thailand) Sonchat Ratiwatana	(Denmark) Frederik Nielsen (Japan) Yuichi Sugita	6–3, 7–5
Loss	19–14	Nov 2010	Eckental, Germany	Carpet(i)	(Thailand) Sonchat Ratiwatana	(United States) Scott Lipsky (United States) Rajeev Ram	7–6^{(7–2)}, 4–6, [4–10]
Loss	19–15	Jan 2011	Singapore, Singapore	Hard	(Thailand) Sonchat Ratiwatana	(United States) Scott Lipsky (United States) David Martin	7–5, 1–6, [8–10]
Loss	19–16	Mar 2011	Guangzhou, China	Hard	(Thailand) Sonchat Ratiwatana	(Russia) Michail Elgin (Russia) Alexandre Kudryavtsev	6–7^{(3–7)}, 3–6
Win	20–16	Aug 2011	Beijing, China	Hard	(Thailand) Sonchat Ratiwatana	(Finland) Harri Heliövaara (Sweden) Michael Ryderstedt	6–7^{(4–7)}, 6–3, [10–3]
Win	21–16	Sep 2011	Shanghai, China	Hard	(Thailand) Sonchat Ratiwatana	(South Africa) Fritz Wolmarans (United States) Michael Yani	7–6^{(7–4)}, 6–3
Win	22–16	Oct 2011	Seoul, South Korea	Hard	(Thailand) Sonchat Ratiwatana	(India) Purav Raja (India) Divij Sharan	6–4, 7–6^{(7–3)}
Win	23–16	Jan 2012	Nouméa, New Caledonia	Hard	(Thailand) Sonchat Ratiwatana	(France) Axel Michon (France) Guillaume Rufin	6–0, 6–4
Win	24–16	Feb 2012	Kazan, Russia	Hard(i)	(Thailand) Sonchat Ratiwatana	(Belarus) Aliaksandr Bury (Poland) Mateusz Kowalczyk	6–3, 6–1
Win	25–16	Mar 2012	Kyoto, Japan	Carpet(i)	(Thailand) Sonchat Ratiwatana	(Chinese Taipei) Hsieh Cheng-peng (Chinese Taipei) Lee Hsin-han	7–6^{(9–7)}, 6–3
Loss	25–17	May 2012	Fergana, Uzbekistan	Hard	(Thailand) Sonchat Ratiwatana	(South Africa) Raven Klaasen (South Africa) Izak van der Merwe	3–6, 4–6
Win	26–17	Jul 2012	Anning, China	Clay	(Thailand) Sonchat Ratiwatana	(South Africa) Ruan Roelofse (Thailand) Kittipong Wachiramanowong	4–6, 7–6^{(7–1)}, [13–11]
Win	27–17	Jul 2012	Wuhan, China	Hard	(Thailand) Sonchat Ratiwatana	(Australia) Adam Feeney (Australia) Sam Groth	6–4, 2–6, [10–8]
Win	28–17	Aug 2012	Beijing, China	Hard	(Thailand) Sonchat Ratiwatana	(India) Yuki Bhambri (India) Divij Sharan	7–6^{(7–3)}, 2–6, [10–6]
Win	29–17	Sep 2012	Shanghai, China	Hard	(Thailand) Sonchat Ratiwatana	(India) Yuki Bhambri (India) Divij Sharan	6–4, 6–4
Win	30–17	Sep 2012	Ningbo, China	Hard	(Thailand) Sonchat Ratiwatana	(China) Gong Maoxin (China) Zhang Ze	6–4, 6–2
Loss	30–18	Nov 2012	Yokohama, Japan	Hard	(Thailand) Sonchat Ratiwatana	(India) Prakash Amritraj (Austria) Philipp Oswald	3–6, 4–6
Win	31–18	Mar 2013	Cherbourg, France	Hard(i)	(Thailand) Sonchat Ratiwatana	(Germany) Philipp Marx (Romania) Florin Mergea	7–5, 6–4
Win	32–18	Jun 2013	Nottingham, United Kingdom	Grass	(Thailand) Sonchat Ratiwatana	(India) Purav Raja (India) Divij Sharan	7–6^{(7–5)}, 6–7^{(3–7)}, [10–8]
Loss	32–19	Jul 2013	Eskişehir, Turkey	Hard	(Thailand) Sonchat Ratiwatana	(Croatia) Marin Draganja (Croatia) Mate Pavić	3–6, 6–3, [7–10]
Win	33–19	Sep 2013	Shanghai, China	Hard	(Thailand) Sonchat Ratiwatana	(Chinese Taipei) Lee Hsin-han (Chinese Taipei) Peng Hsien-yin	6–3, 6–4
Loss	33–20	Nov 2013	Yokohama, Japan	Hard	(Thailand) Sonchat Ratiwatana	(United States) Bradley Klahn (New Zealand) Michael Venus	5–7, 1–6
Loss	33–21	Feb 2014	New Delhi, India	Hard	(Thailand) Sonchat Ratiwatana	(India) Saketh Myneni (India) Sanam Singh	6–7^{(5–7)}, 4–6
Win	34–21	Mar 2014	Guangzhou, China	Hard	(Thailand) Sonchat Ratiwatana	(Chinese Taipei) Lee Hsin-han (Israel) Amir Weintraub	6–2, 6–4
Loss	34–22	Mar 2014	Kyoto, Japan	Carpet(i)	(New Zealand) Michael Venus	(India) Purav Raja (India) Divij Sharan	7–5, 6–7^{(3–7)}, [4–10]
Win	35–22	May 2014	Busan, South Korea	Hard	(Thailand) Sonchat Ratiwatana	(United Kingdom) Jamie Delgado (Australia) John-Patrick Smith	6–4, 6–4
Loss	35–23	Oct 2014	Pune, India	Hard	(Thailand) Sonchat Ratiwatana	(India) Saketh Myneni (India) Sanam Singh	3–6, 2–6
Loss	35–24	May 2015	Taipei, Chinese Taipei	Carpet(i)	(Thailand) Sonchat Ratiwatana	(Australia) Matthew Ebden (Chinese Taipei) Wang Chieh-fu	1–6, 4–6
Win	36–24	May 2015	Busan, South Korea	Hard	(Thailand) Sonchat Ratiwatana	(South Korea) Nam Ji-sung (South Korea) Song Min-kyu	7–6^{(7–2)}, 3–6, [10–7]
Win	37–24	Nov 2015	Kobe, Japan	Hard(i)	(Thailand) Sonchat Ratiwatana	(Chinese Taipei) Chen Ti (Croatia) Franko Škugor	6–4, 2–6, [11–9]
Win	38–24	Nov 2015	Yokohama, Japan	Hard	(Thailand) Sonchat Ratiwatana	(Italy) Riccardo Ghedin (Chinese Taipei) Yi Chu-huan	6–4, 6–4
Loss	38–25	Mar 2016	Guangzhou, China	Hard	(Thailand) Sonchat Ratiwatana	(Russia) Alexander Kudryavtsev (Ukraine) Denys Molchanov	2–6, 2–6
Win	39–25	Apr 2016	Gwangju, South Korea	Hard	(Thailand) Sonchat Ratiwatana	(Denmark) Frederik Nielsen (Republic of Ireland) David O'Hare	6–3, 6–2
Loss	39–26	May 2016	Busan, South Korea	Hard	(Thailand) Sonchat Ratiwatana	(Australia) Sam Groth (India) Leander Paes	6–4, 1–6, [7–10]
Loss	39–27	Sep 2016	Bangkok, Thailand	Hard	(Thailand) Sonchat Ratiwatana	(Thailand) Wishaya Trongcharoenchaikul (Thailand) Kittipong Wachiramanowong	6–7^{(9–11)}, 3–6
Win	40–27	Sep 2016	Kaohsiung, Chinese Taipei	Hard	(Thailand) Sonchat Ratiwatana	(Chinese Taipei) Hsieh Cheng-peng (Chinese Taipei) Yi Chu-huan	6–4, 7–6^{(7–4)}
Win	41–27	Oct 2016	Ho Chi Minh City, Vietnam	Hard	(Thailand) Sonchat Ratiwatana	(India) Jeevan Nedunchezhiyan (India) Ramkumar Ramanathan	7–5, 6–4
Win	42–27	Jan 2017	Bangkok, Thailand	Hard	(Thailand) Sonchat Ratiwatana	(France) Sadio Doumbia (France) Fabien Reboul	7–6^{(7–4)}, 7–5
Win	43–27	Feb 2017	Kyoto, Japan	Hard(i)	(Thailand) Sonchat Ratiwatana	(Belgium) Ruben Bemelmans (Belgium) Joris De Loore	4–6, 6–4, [10–7]
Win	44–27	Mar 2017	Shenzhen, China	Hard	(Thailand) Sonchat Ratiwatana	(Chinese Taipei) Hsieh Cheng-peng (Indonesia) Christopher Rungkat	6–2, 6–7^{(5–7)}, [10–6]
Loss	44–28	Apr 2017	Taipei, Chinese Taipei	Carpet(i)	(Thailand) Sonchat Ratiwatana	(Switzerland) Marco Chiudinelli (Croatia) Franko Škugor	6–4, 2–6, [5–10]
Loss	44–29	May 2017	Busan, South Korea	Hard	(Thailand) Sonchat Ratiwatana	(Chinese Taipei) Hsieh Cheng-peng (Chinese Taipei) Peng Hsien-yin	5–7, 6–4, [8–10]
Win	45–29	Jul 2017	Winnetka, United States	Hard	(Indonesia) Christopher Rungkat	(United States) Bradley Klahn (United States) Kevin King	7–6^{(7–4)}, 6–2
Win	46–29	Oct 2017	Kaohsiung, Chinese Taipei	Hard	(Thailand) Sonchat Ratiwatana	(Israel) Jonathan Erlich (Austria) Alexander Peya	6–4, 1–6, [10–6]
Win	47–29	Nov 2017	Hua Hin, Thailand	Hard	(Thailand) Sonchat Ratiwatana	(United States) Austin Krajicek (United States) Jackson Withrow	6–4, 5–7, [10–5]
Loss	47–30	Mar 2018	Yokohama, Japan	Hard	(Thailand) Sonchat Ratiwatana	(Germany) Tobias Kamke (Germany) Tim Pütz	6–3, 5–7, [10–12]
Loss	47–31	May 2018	Gimcheon, South Korea	Hard	(Thailand) Sonchat Ratiwatana	(South Africa) Ruan Roelofse (Austria) John-Patrick Smith	2–6, 3–6
Loss	47–32	Oct 2018	Stockton, United States	Hard	(Indonesia) Christopher Rungkat	(Barbados) Darian King (United States) Noah Rubin	3–6, 4–6
Win	48–32	Oct 2018	Fairfield, United States	Hard	(Indonesia) Christopher Rungkat	(Finland) Harri Heliövaara (Switzerland) Henri Laaksonen	6–0, 7–6^{(11–9)}
Loss	48–33	Jan 2020	Bangkok, Thailand	Hard	(Indonesia) Christopher Rungkat	(Kazakhstan) Andrey Golubev (Kazakhstan) Aleksandr Nedovyesov	6–3, 6–7^{(1–7)}, [5–10]

== Grand Slam doubles timeline ==
Key
W	F	SF	QF	#R	RR	Q#	DNQ	A	NH

(W) winner; (F) finalist; (SF) semifinalist; (QF) quarterfinalist; (#R) rounds 4, 3, 2, 1; (RR) round-robin stage; (Q#) qualification round; (DNQ) did not qualify; (A) absent; (NH) not held; (SR) strike rate (events won / competed); (W–L) win–loss record.
To avoid confusion and double counting, these charts are updated at the conclusion of a tournament or when the player's participation has ended.

Tournament	2006	2007	2008	2009	2010	2011	2012	2013	2014	2015	2016	2017	2018	W–L
Australian Open	A	A	1R	A	A	1R	A	1R	A					0–3
French Open	A	A	1R	A	A	A	A	1R	A					0–2
Wimbledon	2R	1R	1R	2R	3R	1R	2R	2R	A					6–8
US Open	A	A	1R	A	A	A	1R	A						0–2
Win–loss	1–1	0–1	0–4	1–1	2–1	0–2	1–2	1–3						6–15
