= Wang Chuhan =

Chinese tennis player

Wang Chuhan 王楚涵
- Full name: Wang Chuhan
- Country (sports): China
- Residence: Beijing, China
- Born: 24 February 1992 (age 34) Dalian, China
- Height: 1.88 m (6 ft 2 in)
- Retired: 2022 (last match played)
- Plays: Right-handed (two handed-backhand)
- Prize money: $121,319

Singles
- Career record: 1–2 (at ATP Tour level, Grand Slam level, and in Davis Cup)
- Career titles: 0 (0 Challenger, 2 ITF)
- Highest ranking: No. 365 (20 March 2015)

Doubles
- Career record: 0–0
- Career titles: 0 (0 Challenger, 2 ITF)
- Highest ranking: No. 558 (27 February 2017)
- Last updated on: 18 April 2021.

Wang Chuhan (Chinese: 王楚涵; pinyin: Wáng Chǔhán; Mandarin pronunciation: [wǎŋ ʈʂʰù xǎn]; born 24 February 1992 in Dalian) is a Chinese former tennis player.

As a junior, Wang peaked at a career high of world No. 24. He played in the junior Australian and French Open but did not perform significantly.

Wang represents his native country China in Davis Cup matches and has a record of 0– in singles matches. 1

Wang has a career high ATP singles ranking of 377 achieved on 9 February 2015. He received a wildcard entry into the main draw of the 2014 Shanghai Rolex Masters, where he made his ATP Tour match debut and made the most of it. In the first round, he defeated the 15th seed Fabio Fognini of Italy 7–6^{(7–5(}, 6–4 which was a huge upset. He fell in the second round to Tunisia's Malek Jaziri in straight sets 0–6, 4–6.

== ATP Challenger and ITF Futures finals ==
=== Singles: 5 (2–3) ===
Legend ATP Challenger (0–0) ITF Futures (2–3)	Finals by surface Hard (2–3) Clay (0–0) Grass (0–0) Carpet (0–0)

Result	W–L	Date	Tournament	Tier	Surface	Opponent	Score
Loss	0–1	May 2011	China F5, Nanjing	Futures	Hard	(Chinese Taipei) Chen Ti	2–6, 0–1 ret.
Loss	0–2	May 2013	China F5, Putian	Futures	Hard	(Chinese Taipei) Huang Liang-chi	6–7^{(1–7)}, 3–6
Loss	0–3	Jul 2013	Uzbekistan F4, Namangan	Futures	Hard	(Uzbekistan) Temur Ismailov	3–6, 5–7,
Win	1–3	May 2017	China F6, Wuhan	Futures	Hard	(Thailand) Wishaya Trongcharoenchaikul	6–7^{(6–8)}, 6–4, 6–4
Win	2–3	Jul 2017	China F12, Shenzhen	Futures	Hard	(Chinese Taipei) Wu Tung-lin	6–4, 7–6^{(7–5(}

=== Doubles: 4 (2–2) ===
Legend ATP Challenger (0–0) ITF Futures (2–2)	Finals by surface Hard (1–2) Clay (1–0) Grass (0–0) Carpet (0–0)

Result	W–L	Date	Tournament	Tier	Surface	Partner	Opponents	Score
Loss	0–1	Aug 2014	Spain F22, Ourense	Futures	Hard	(China) Siya Liu	(Spain) Ricardo Villacorta-Alonso (Spain) Ivan Arenas-Gualda	7–6^{(7–3)}, 6–3, [7–10]
Win	1–1	Mar 2016	China F3, Anning	Futures	Clay	(Colombia) Cristian Rodríguez	(China) Cui Jie (China) Te Rigele	7–6^{(7–5)}, 6–2
Loss	1–2	May 2016	China F8, Lu'an	Futures	Hard	(Chinese Taipei) Peng Hsien-yin	(China) Ouyang Bowen (China) Gao Xin	5–7, 3–6
Win	2–2	Jun 2016	Hong Kong F2	Futures	Hard	(China) Ning Yuqing	(Estonia) Markus Kerner (Latvia) Miķelis Lībietis	6–7^{(2–7)}, 7–6^{(7–5)}, [10–8]
