= Luca Castelnuovo =

Swiss tennis player

- Country (sports): Switzerland
- Residence: Sonvilier, Switzerland
- Born: 29 January 1997 (age 29) Locarno, Switzerland
- Height: 1.88 m (6 ft 2 in)
- Plays: Left-handed (one-handed backhand)
- Coach: Alexis Bernhard Castelnuovo
- Prize money: US $162,241

Singles
- Career record: 0–0
- Career titles: 0
- Highest ranking: No. 342 (25 May 2026)
- Current ranking: No. 398 (14 September 2026)

Doubles
- Career record: 0–0
- Career titles: 0
- Highest ranking: No. 267 (11 July 2022)
- Current ranking: No. 476 (14 September 2026)
- Last updated on: 18 September 2026.

Luca Castelnuovo (born 29 January 1997) is a Swiss tennis player. Castelnuovo has a career high ATP singles ranking of No. 342 achieved on 25 May 2026 and a career high doubles ranking of No. 267 achieved on 11 July 2022.

Castelnuovo has won 3 ATP Challenger doubles titles.

== ATP Challenger Tour finals ==
=== Doubles: 3 (3 titles) ===
| Legend ATP Challenger Tour (3–0) | Finals by surface Hard (2–0) Clay (1–0) |

| Result | W–L | Date | Tournament | Tier | Surface | Partner | Opponents | Score |
|---|---|---|---|---|---|---|---|---|
| Win | 1–0 | Jul 2021 | Amersfoort, Netherlands | Challenger | Clay | (France) Manuel Guinard | (Peru) Sergio Galdós (Portugal) Gonçalo Oliveira | 0–6, 6–4, [11–9] |
| Win | 2–0 | Aug 2023 | Zhuhai, China | Challenger | Hard | (Poland) Filip Peliwo | (China) Li Hanwen (China) Li Zhe | 7–5, 7–6^{(7–4)} |
| Win | 3–0 | Sep 2023 | Guangzhou, China | Challenger | Hard | (Switzerland) Antoine Bellier | (Chinese Taipei) Ray Ho (Australia) Matthew Romios | 6–3, 7–6^{(7–5)} |
