= Cui Jie (tennis) =

Chinese tennis player

- Country (sports): China
- Born: 24 January 1998 (age 28) Beijing, China
- Height: 1.83 m (6 ft 0 in)
- Plays: Right-handed (two-handed backhand)
- Prize money: $ 170,827

Singles
- Career record: 1–2 (at ATP Tour level, Grand Slam level, and in Davis Cup)
- Career titles: 3 ITF
- Highest ranking: No. 280 (27 January 2025)
- Current ranking: No. 456 (21 September 2026)

Doubles
- Career record: 0–4 (at ATP Tour level, Grand Slam level, and in Davis Cup)
- Career titles: 3 ITF
- Highest ranking: No. 313 (10 June 2024)
- Current ranking: No. 977 (16 June 2025)
- Last updated on: 16 June 2025.

Cui Jie (born 24 January 1998) is a Chinese tennis player.

Cui has a career high ATP singles ranking of world No. 280 achieved on 27 January 2025. He also has a career high ATP doubles ranking of No. 313 achieved on 10 June 2024.

He represents China at the Davis Cup, where he has a W/L record of 0–2.

== Career ==
Cui made his ATP main draw debut at the 2023 Chengdu Open after receiving wildcards into the singles and doubles main draws. He also made appearances at the 2023 China Open and 2024 Chengdu Open with a wildcard into the doubles main draws.

== Performance timeline ==
Key
W	F	SF	QF	#R	RR	Q#	DNQ	A	NH

(W) winner; (F) finalist; (SF) semifinalist; (QF) quarterfinalist; (#R) rounds 4, 3, 2, 1; (RR) round-robin stage; (Q#) qualification round; (DNQ) did not qualify; (A) absent; (NH) not held; (SR) strike rate (events won / competed); (W–L) win–loss record.
To avoid confusion and double counting, these charts are updated at the conclusion of a tournament or when the player's participation has ended.

=== Singles ===
Tournament	2024	2025	SR	W–L	Win %
Grand Slam tournaments
Australian Open	A	A	0 / 0	0–0	–
French Open	A	A	0 / 0	0–0	–
Wimbledon	A	A	0 / 0	0–0	–
US Open	A	A	0 / 0	0–0	–
Win–loss	0–0	0–0	0 / 0	0–0	–
ATP Masters 1000
Indian Wells Masters	A	A	0 / 0	0–0	–
Miami Open	A	A	0 / 0	0–0	–
Monte Carlo Masters	A	A	0 / 0	0–0	–
Madrid Open	A	A	0 / 0	0-0	–
Italian Open	A	A	0 / 0	0–0	–
Canadian Open	A	A	0 / 0	0–0	–
Cincinnati Masters	A	A	0 / 0	0–0	–
Shanghai Masters	Q1	Q1	0 / 0	0–0	–
Paris Masters	A		0 / 0	0–0	–
Win–loss	0–0		0 / 0	0–0	–

== Career finals ==
=== Singles: 15 (6 titles, 9 runner-ups) ===
Legend ATP Challenger Tour (0–1) ITF Futures Tour / World Tennis Tour (6–8)	Finals by Surface Hard (5–8) Clay (1–1) Grass (0–0) Carpet (0–0)

Result	W–L	Date	Tournament	Tier	Surface	Opponent	Score
Loss	0–1	Jul 2018	China F11, Kunshan	Futures	Hard	(China) Bai Yan	3–6, 3–6
Loss	0–2	May 2019	M25 Lu'an, China	World Tennis Tour	Hard	(China) Sun Fajing	5–7, 4–6
Loss	0–3	Jun 2022	M15 Chiang Rai, Thailand	World Tennis Tour	Hard	(China) Bu Yunchaokete	1–6, 4–6
Loss	0–4	Jul 2023	M15 Tianjin, China	World Tennis Tour	Hard	(China) Li Zhe	6–4, 6–7^{(6–8)}, 4–6
Loss	0–5	Aug 2023	M25 Anning, China	World Tennis Tour	Clay	(China) Sun Fajing	3–6, 6–4, 2–6
Win	1–5	Aug 2023	M25 Yinchuan, China	World Tennis Tour	Hard	(China) Sun Fajing	6–3, 7–5
Loss	1–6	Feb 2024	M15 Nakhon Si Thammarat, Thailand	World Tennis Tour	Hard	(Brazil) Gabriel Décamps	2–6, 4–6
Win	2–6	Mar 2024	M15 Nakhon Si Thammarat, Thailand	World Tennis Tour	Hard	(Greece) Stefanos Sakellaridis	6–4, 3–6, 6–3
Win	3–6	May 2024	M25 Anning, China	World Tennis Tour	Clay	(China) Bai Yan	6–3, 6–4
Loss	3–7	Sep 2024	M25 Fuzhou, China	World Tennis Tour	Hard	(Tunisia) Aziz Dougaz	6–4, 3–6, 6–5 ret.
Loss	0–1	Jan 2025	Nonthaburi, Thailand	Challenger	Hard	(Japan) Rio Noguchi	6–7^{(9–11)}, 2–6
Win	4–7	May 2025	M15 Lu'an, China	World Tennis Tour	Hard	(South Korea) Shin Woobin	6–3, 6–3
Win	5–7	Jun 2025	M15 Lu'an, China	World Tennis Tour	Hard	(China) Bai Yan	5–7, 6–3, 7–5
Loss	5–8	Jun 2025	M15 Luzhou, China	World Tennis Tour	Hard	(Switzerland) Luca Castelnuovo	3–6, 3–6
Win	6–8	Mar 2026	M15 Ma'anshan, China	World Tennis Tour	Hard	(United States) Andre Ilagan	6–7^{(4–7)}, 6–2, 6–4
Loss	6–9	Apr 2026	M25 Luzhou, China	World Tennis Tour	Hard	(United Kingdom) Alastair Gray	1–6, 4–6

=== Doubles: 11 (3–8) ===
Legend ATP Challenger Tour (0–1) ITF Futures Tour / World Tennis Tour (3–7)	Finals by Surface Hard (2–4) Clay (1–4) Grass (0–0) Carpet (0–0)

Result	W–L	Date	Tournament	Tier	Surface	Partner	Opponents	Score
Loss	0–1	Mar 2016	China F3, Anning	Futures	Clay	(China) Te Rigele	(Colombia) Cristian Rodríguez (China) Wang Chuhan	6–7^{(5–7)}, 2–6
Loss	0–2	Jan 2018	China F2, Anning	Futures	Clay	(China) Wang Huixin	(China) Wang Ruikai (China) Wang Ruixuan	3–6, 6–2, [4–10]
Loss	0–3	Jul 2022	M15 Seremban, Malaysia	World Tennis Tour	Hard	(Chinese Taipei) Huang Tsung-hao	(Japan) Tomohiro Masabayashi (Japan) Daisuke Sumizawa	4–6, 7–6^{(7–5)}, [11–13]
Loss	0–4	Feb 2023	M25 Monastir, Tunisia	World Tennis Tour	Hard	(Chinese Taipei) Huang Tsung-hao	(Italy) Fausto Tabacco (Italy) Giorgio Tabacco	3–6, 4–6
Win	1–4	Jun 2023	M25 Luzhou, China	World Tennis Tour	Hard	(Chinese Taipei) Ray Ho	(China) Li Hanwen (China) Sun Qian	6–3, 6–2
Win	2–4	Jun 2023	M25 Fuzhou, China	World Tennis Tour	Hard	(China) Wang Xiaofei	(China) Dong Bohua (China) Gao Xin	6–4, 6–4
Win	3–4	Aug 2023	M25 Anning, China	World Tennis Tour	Clay	(China) Wang Xiaofei	(China) Sun Fajing (United States) Evan Zhu	3–6, 6–2, [10–8]
Loss	3–5	Apr 2024	Gwangju, South Korea	Challenger	Hard	(South Korea) Lee Duck-hee	(South Korea) Lee Jea-moon (South Korea) Song Min-kyu	6–1, 1–6, [3–10]
Loss	3–6	May 2024	M25 Lu'an, China	World Tennis Tour	Hard	(South Korea) Lee Duck-hee	(New Zealand) Ajeet Rai (China) Sun Fajing	2–6, 2–6
Loss	3–7	May 2024	M25 Anning, China	World Tennis Tour	Clay	(China) Sun Fajing	(Chinese Taipei) Jeffrey Hsu (South Korea) Shin Woo-bin	6–2, 3–6, [5–10]
Loss	3–8	Jun 2024	M25 Baotou, China	World Tennis Tour	Clay	(China) Sun Fajing	(China) Te Rigele (United States) Evan Zhu	3–6, 6–2, [6–10]
