= Guangzhou International Challenger =

Tournament information
- Event name: Guangzhou Nansha International Challenger
- Founded: 2008; 18 years ago
- Location: Guangzhou, China
- Venue: Guangzhou Nansha International Tennis Center
- Category: ATP Challenger Tour
- Surface: Hard
- Prize money: $100,000

The Guangzhou Nansha International Challenger (formerly known as "GDD CUP" International Challenger Guangzhou and China International Guangzhou) is a tennis tournament held in Guangzhou, China, played on hardcourts. The event was held in 2008 as part of the ATP Challenger Series, and since 2011 is part of the ATP Challenger Tour.

== Past finals ==
=== Singles ===
Year	Champion	Runner-up	Score
2026	(Australia) Tristan Schoolkate	(Hong Kong) Coleman Wong	4–6, 7–6^{(7–3)}, 6–4
2025	(France) Térence Atmane	(Australia) Tristan Schoolkate	6–3, 7–6^{(7–4)}
2024	(Australia) Tristan Schoolkate	(Australia) Adam Walton	6–3, 3–6, 6–3
2023	(France) Térence Atmane	(Australia) Marc Polmans	4–6, 7–6^{(9–7)}, 6–4
2017– 2022	Not held		
2016	(Georgia (country)) Nikoloz Basilashvili	(Slovakia) Lukáš Lacko	6–1, 6–7^{(6–8)}, 7–5
2015	(Belgium) Kimmer Coppejans	(Italy) Roberto Marcora	7–6^{(8–6)}, 5–7, 6–1
2014	(Slovenia) Blaž Rola	(Japan) Yūichi Sugita	6–7^{(4–7)}, 6–4, 6–3
2012– 2013	Not held		
2011	(Belarus) Uladzimir Ignatik	(Russia) Alexandre Kudryavtsev	6–4, 6–4
2009– 2010	Not held		
2008	(Sweden) Björn Rehnquist	(Thailand) Danai Udomchoke	2–6, 7–6^{(7–4)}, 6–2

=== Doubles ===
Year	Champions	Runners-up	Score
2026	(Netherlands) Thijmen Loof (Japan) Kaito Uesugi	(Chinese Taipei) Hsu Yu-hsiou (China) Sun Fajing	6–2, 6–2
2025	(Chinese Taipei) Ray Ho (Australia) Matthew Romios	(United States) Vasil Kirkov (Netherlands) Bart Stevens	6–3, 6–4
2024	(Australia) Blake Ellis (Australia) Tristan Schoolkate	(South Korea) Nam Ji-sung (Finland) Patrik Niklas-Salminen	6–2, 6–7^{(4–7)}, [10–4]
2023	(Switzerland) Antoine Bellier (Switzerland) Luca Castelnuovo	(Chinese Taipei) Ray Ho (Australia) Matthew Romios	6–3, 7–6^{(7–5)}
2017– 2022	Not held		
2016	(Russia) Alexander Kudryavtsev (Ukraine) Denys Molchanov	(Thailand) Sanchai Ratiwatana (Thailand) Sonchat Ratiwatana	6–2, 6–2
2015	(Spain) Daniel Muñoz de la Nava (Kazakhstan) Aleksandr Nedovyesov	(France) Fabrice Martin (India) Purav Raja	6–2, 7–5
2014	(Thailand) Sanchai Ratiwatana (Thailand) Sonchat Ratiwatana	(Chinese Taipei) Lee Hsin-han (Israel) Amir Weintraub	6–2, 6–4
2012– 2013	Not held		
2011	(Russia) Michail Elgin (Russia) Alexander Kudryavtsev	(Thailand) Sanchai Ratiwatana (Thailand) Sonchat Ratiwatana	7–6^{(7–3)}, 6–3
2009– 2010	Not held		
2008	(China) Yu Xinyuan (China) Zeng Shaoxuan	(United States) Phillip King (Thailand) Danai Udomchoke	1–6, 6–3, [10–5]
