= 2023 Shenzhen Luohu Challenger – Singles =

Singles
- 2023 Shenzhen Luohu Challenger

Final
- Champion: (Australia) James Duckworth
- Runner-up: (Hong Kong) Coleman Wong
- Score: 6–0, 6–1

Events
Singles	Doubles
Shenzhen Luohu Challenger	· 2024 →

This was the first edition of the tournament.

James Duckworth won the title after defeating Coleman Wong 6–0, 6–1 in the final.

== Seeds ==
1. (Australia) James Duckworth (champion)
2. (United States) Aleksandar Kovacevic (semifinals, withdrew)
3. (France) Térence Atmane (second round)
4. (China) Bu Yunchaokete (semifinals)
5. (Australia) Li Tu (quarterfinals)
6. Evgeny Donskoy (first round)
7. (Kazakhstan) Denis Yevseyev (first round)
8. (Canada) Steven Diez (second round)

== Draw ==
Key

- Q = Qualifier
- WC = Wild card
- LL = Lucky loser
- Alt = Alternate
- ITF = ITF entry
- PR = Protected ranking
- SR = Special ranking
- SE = Special exempt
- JE = Junior exempt
- JR = Junior Accelerator Programme entrant
- CO = College Accelerator Programme entrant
- NG = Next Gen Accelerator Program entrant
- w/o = Walkover
- r = Retired
- d = Defaulted

=== Finals ===
Semifinals
1	(Australia) James Duckworth	6	6
4	(China) Bu Yunchaokete	1	2
(Hong Kong) Coleman Wong	w/o
2/SE	(United States) Aleksandar Kovacevic

Final
1	(Australia) James Duckworth	6	6
(Hong Kong) Coleman Wong	0	1

=== Top half ===
First round
1	(Australia) J Duckworth	6	6
(Japan) Y Takahashi	3	2
Q	(China) Z Li	6	7^{7}
Q	(Thailand) W Trongcharoenchaikul	3	6^{0}
(Czech Republic) D Palán	6	6
Q	(China) Y Mo	3	3
(New Zealand) R Statham	5	3
5	(Australia) L Tu	7	6
4	(China) Y Bu	6	6
(Australia) L Saville	3	3
(China) F Sun	3	6^{7}
A Kachmazov	6	7^{9}
(France) A Weber	4	7^{7}	6^{3}
WC	(China) Y Bai	6	6^{2}	7^{7}
(Vietnam) NH Lý	4	1
8	(Canada) S Diez	6	6

Second round
1	(Australia) J Duckworth	7^{7}	6
Q	(China) Z Li	6^{4}	4
(Czech Republic) D Palán	3	6	2
5	(Australia) L Tu	6	3	6
4	(China) Y Bu	6	6
A Kachmazov	3	4
WC	(China) Y Bai	3	6	6
8	(Canada) S Diez	6	1	4

Quarterfinals
1	(Australia) J Duckworth	6	6
5	(Australia) L Tu	1	1
4	(China) Y Bu	6	6
WC	(China) Y Bai	3	2

Semifinals
1	(Australia) J Duckworth	6	6
4	(China) Y Bu	1	2

=== Bottom half ===
First round
7	(Kazakhstan) D Yevseyev	2	2
Q	E Gerasimov	6	6
(Zimbabwe) B Lock	5	4
Q	(Chinese Taipei) T-h Huang	7	6
Q	(China) Xiao Linang	3	6^{4}
(Hong Kong) C Wong	6	7^{7}
Mikalai Haliak	1	4
3	(France) T Atmane	6	6
6	E Donskoy	6	3	4
(Northern Mariana Islands) C Sinclair	2	6	6
(Italy) L Giustino	6	6
Alt	(China) R Te	4	3
(Kazakhstan) B Zhukayev	6	6
WC	(China) Wang Xiaofei	3	4
WC	(China) Charles Chen	3	1
2/SE	(United States) A Kovacevic	6	6

Second round
Q	E Gerasimov	3	2
Q	(Chinese Taipei) T-h Huang	6	6
(Hong Kong) C Wong	3	6	7
3	(France) T Atmane	6	3	5
(Northern Mariana Islands) C Sinclair	3	4
(Italy) L Giustino	6	6
(Kazakhstan) B Zhukayev	4	7^{7}	0
2/SE	(United States) A Kovacevic	6	6^{1}	6

Quarterfinals
Q	(Chinese Taipei) T-h Huang	6	5	3
(Hong Kong) C Wong	4	7	6
(Italy) L Giustino	3	6	3
2/SE	(United States) A Kovacevic	6	3	6

Semifinals
(Hong Kong) C Wong	w/o
2/SE	(United States) A Kovacevic
