= 2019 International Challenger Baotou – Doubles =

Doubles
- 2019 International Challenger Baotou

Final
- Champions: (South Korea) Nam Ji-sung (South Korea) Song Min-kyu
- Runners-up: (Russia) Teymuraz Gabashvili (India) Sasikumar Mukund
- Score: 7–6^{(7–3)}, 6–2

Events
Singles	Doubles
- International Challenger Baotou

This was the first edition of the tournament.

Nam Ji-sung and Song Min-kyu won the title after defeating Teymuraz Gabashvili and Sasikumar Mukund 7–6^{(7–3)}, 6–2 in the final.

== Seeds ==
1. (Portugal) Gonçalo Oliveira / (Australia) Luke Saville (semifinals)
2. (South Korea) Nam Ji-sung / (South Korea) Song Min-kyu (champions)
3. (United States) John Paul Fruttero / (India) Arjun Kadhe (first round)
4. (China) Sun Fajing / (China) Wu Di (semifinals)

== Draw ==
Key

- Q = Qualifier
- WC = Wild card
- LL = Lucky loser
- Alt = Alternate
- ITF = ITF entry
- PR = Protected ranking
- SR = Special ranking
- SE = Special exempt
- JE = Junior exempt
- JR = Junior Accelerator Programme entrant
- CO = College Accelerator Programme entrant
- NG = Next Gen Accelerator Program entrant
- w/o = Walkover
- r = Retired
- d = Defaulted

First round
1	(Portugal) G Oliveira (Australia) L Saville	6	6
(China) R Hua (China) Zh Zhang	2	2
WC	(China) J Cui (China) Chuh Wang	2	0
(China) Y Bai (Chinese Taipei) T-h Yang	6	6
3	(United States) JP Fruttero (India) A Kadhe	3	3
(Russia) T Gabashvili (India) S Mukund	6	6
(Australia) H Bourchier (New Zealand) R Purcell	3	4
(Chinese Taipei) C-h Tseng (Chinese Taipei) T-l Wu	6	6
(Russia) I Nedelko (Japan) K Takeuchi	7	6
WC	(China) Liu Hanyi (China) Wang Chukang	5	4
(Spain) R Ortega Olmedo (United States) Evan Song	2	2
4	(China) F Sun (China) D Wu	6	6
(Australia) Jacob Grills (Australia) A Vukic	3	7^{12}	[6]
(Switzerland) L Castelnuovo (France) Baptiste Crepatte	6	6^{10}	[10]
WC	(China) Gao Yixin (China) Wang Huixin	4	5
2	(South Korea) J-s Nam (South Korea) M-k Song	6	7

Quarterfinals
1	(Portugal) G Oliveira (Australia) L Saville	4	7^{7}	[10]
(China) Y Bai (Chinese Taipei) T-h Yang	6	6^{4}	[7]
(Russia) T Gabashvili (India) S Mukund	3	6	[10]
(Chinese Taipei) C-h Tseng (Chinese Taipei) T-l Wu	6	3	[4]
(Russia) I Nedelko (Japan) K Takeuchi	6^{5}	4
4	(China) F Sun (China) D Wu	7^{7}	6
(Switzerland) L Castelnuovo (France) B Crepatte	6^{5}	2
2	(South Korea) J-s Nam (South Korea) M-k Song	7^{7}	6

Semifinals
1	(Portugal) G Oliveira (Australia) L Saville	3	6	[11]
(Russia) T Gabashvili (India) S Mukund	6	3	[13]
4	(China) F Sun (China) D Wu	6^{4}	3
2	(South Korea) J-s Nam (South Korea) M-k Song	7^{7}	6

Final
(Russia) T Gabashvili (India) S Mukund	6^{3}	2
2	(South Korea) J-s Nam (South Korea) M-k Song	7^{7}	6
