= Shenzhen Open =

Shenzhen Open may refer to:

- ATP Shenzhen Open, a men's professional tennis tournament
- WTA Shenzhen Open, a women's professional tennis tournament
- Shenzhen Longhua Open, a professional tennis tournament
- Shenzhen Luohu Challenger, a professional tennis tournament
- Shenzhen Open (snooker), a professional ranking snooker tournament
