= 2016 KPN Renewables Bangkok Open – Singles =

Singles
- 2016 KPN Renewables Bangkok Open

Final
- Champion: (Australia) James Duckworth
- Runner-up: (Republic of Ireland) Sam Barry
- Score: 7–6^{(7–5)}, 6–4

Events
Singles	Doubles
- KPN Renewables Bangkok Open

This was the first edition of the tournament.

James Duckworth won the title after defeating Sam Barry 7–6^{(7–5)}, 6–4 in the final.

== Seeds ==
1. (Australia) Sam Groth (first round, retired)
2. (Chinese Taipei) Lu Yen-hsun (quarterfinals)
3. (Japan) Yūichi Sugita (first round)
4. (Slovakia) Lukáš Lacko (second round, retired)
5. (Australia) John-Patrick Smith (first round, retired)
6. (United States) Alexander Sarkissian (semifinals)
7. (China) Zhang Ze (quarterfinals)
8. (Australia) James Duckworth (champion)

== Draw ==
Key

- Q = Qualifier
- WC = Wild card
- LL = Lucky loser
- Alt = Alternate
- ITF = ITF entry
- PR = Protected ranking
- SR = Special ranking
- SE = Special exempt
- JE = Junior exempt
- JR = Junior Accelerator Programme entrant
- CO = College Accelerator Programme entrant
- NG = Next Gen Accelerator Program entrant
- w/o = Walkover
- r = Retired
- d = Defaulted

=== Finals ===
Semifinals
Q	(Republic of Ireland) Sam Barry	6	7^{7}
(United Kingdom) Alexander Ward	2	6^{3}
6	(United States) Alexander Sarkissian	7^{8}	4	2
8	(Australia) James Duckworth	6^{6}	6	6

Final
Q	(Republic of Ireland) Sam Barry	6^{5}	4
8	(Australia) James Duckworth	7^{7}	6

=== Top half ===
First round
1	(Australia) S Groth	4	0^{r}
(United Kingdom) L Broady	6	0
Q	(Republic of Ireland) S Barry	6	6
WC	(Thailand) J Navasirisomboon	2	2
Q	(India) Sidharth Rawat	4	6^{4}
PR	(France) R Boutillier	6	7^{7}
(United States) M Krueger	6	4
5	(Australia) J-P Smith	2	1^{r}
3	(Japan) Y Sugita	3	6	1
(United Kingdom) A Ward	6	3	6
(Chinese Taipei) J Wang	2	2
(Switzerland) A Bossel	6	6
(Japan) Y Uchiyama	6^{5}	4
(Argentina) A Velotti	7^{7}	6
(Argentina) JI Londero	5	2
7	(China) Z Zhang	7	6

Second round
(United Kingdom) L Broady	4	0
Q	(Republic of Ireland) S Barry	6	6
PR	(France) R Boutillier	6	3	4
(United States) M Krueger	3	6	6
(United Kingdom) A Ward	7	6
(Switzerland) A Bossel	5	3
(Argentina) A Velotti	4	4
7	(China) Z Zhang	6	6

Quarterfinals
Q	(Republic of Ireland) S Barry	7	5	6
(United States) M Krueger	5	7	2
(United Kingdom) A Ward	6	1	7
7	(China) Z Zhang	4	6	5

Semifinals
Q	(Republic of Ireland) S Barry	6	7^{7}
(United Kingdom) A Ward	2	6^{3}

=== Bottom half ===
First round
6	(United States) A Sarkissian	7	2	6
WC	(Thailand) Phassawit Burapharitta	5	6	1
(Australia) M Reid	2	6^{5}
Q	(Japan) Yuya Kibi	6	7^{7}
Q	(United Kingdom) L Glasspool	6	6
(Australia) A Whittington	4	0
(South Africa) L Harris	5	6	3
4	(Slovakia) L Lacko	7	4	6
8	(Australia) J Duckworth	6^{4}	6	6
(Chinese Taipei) T Chen	7^{7}	5	0
WC	(Thailand) K Wachiramanowong	3	2
(Chinese Taipei) J Jung	6	6
(United States) S Bangoura	6	6
WC	(Thailand) W Trongcharoenchaikul	3	3
(United States) Connor Smith	1	5
2	(Chinese Taipei) Y-h Lu	6	7

Second round
6	(United States) A Sarkissian	6	6
Q	(Japan) Y Kibi	4	2
Q	(United Kingdom) L Glasspool	7^{7}	4
4	(Slovakia) L Lacko	6^{5}	1^{r}
8	(Australia) J Duckworth	7	6
(Chinese Taipei) J Jung	5	4
(United States) S Bangoura	2	3
2	(Chinese Taipei) Y-h Lu	6	6

Quarterfinals
6	(United States) A Sarkissian	6	6
Q	(United Kingdom) L Glasspool	2	2
8	(Australia) J Duckworth	6^{6}	6	6
2	(Chinese Taipei) Y-h Lu	7^{8}	2	2

Semifinals
6	(United States) A Sarkissian	7^{8}	4	2
8	(Australia) J Duckworth	6^{6}	6	6
