= 2024 Shenzhen Luohu Challenger =

- Date: 22–28 April
- Edition: 2nd
- Surface: Hard
- Location: Shenzhen, China

Champions

Singles
- (South Africa) Lloyd Harris

Doubles
- (Japan) Yuta Shimizu / (Japan) James Trotter
← 2023 ·	Shenzhen Luohu Challenger	· 2025 →

The 2024 Shenzhen Luohu Challenger was a professional tennis tournament played on hardcourts. It was the second edition of the tournament which was part of the 2024 ATP Challenger Tour. It took place in Shenzhen, China between 22 and 28 April 2024.

== Singles main-draw entrants ==
=== Seeds ===
Country	Player	Rank^{1}	Seed
AUS	James Duckworth	104	1
~~AUS~~	~~Adam Walton~~	~~129~~	~~2~~
JPN	Yasutaka Uchiyama	167	3
RSA	Lloyd Harris	171	4
ITA	Mattia Bellucci	180	5
KAZ	Denis Yevseyev	185	6
~~CHN~~	~~Bu Yunchaokete~~	~~186~~	~~7~~
HKG	Coleman Wong	188	8
AUS	Li Tu	193	9

- ^{1} Rankings are as of 15 April 2024.

=== Other entrants ===
The following players received wildcards into the singles main draw:

- (China) Sun Fajing
- (China) Te Rigele
- (China) Zhou Yi

The following players received entry into the singles main draw as alternates:

- Alibek Kachmazov
- (Australia) Luke Saville
- (Australia) Philip Sekulic

The following players received entry from the qualifying draw:

- (Lithuania) Ričardas Berankis
- (Switzerland) Rémy Bertola
- (Turkey) Altuğ Çelikbilek
- (Australia) James McCabe
- (Japan) Rio Noguchi
- (Japan) James Trotter

The following player received entry as a lucky loser:

- (Japan) Hiroki Moriya

== Champions ==
=== Singles ===
- (South Africa) Lloyd Harris def. (Australia) James Duckworth 6–3, 6–3.

=== Doubles ===
- (Japan) Yuta Shimizu / (Japan) James Trotter def. (China) Wang Aoran / (China) Zhou Yi 7–6^{(7–5)}, 7–6^{(7–4)}.
