= 2019 International Challenger Baotou =

- Date: 26 August – 1 September
- Edition: 1st
- Draw: 48S / 4Q / 16D
- Surface: Clay (indoor)
- Location: Baotou, China

Champions

Singles
- (Australia) James Duckworth

Doubles
- (South Korea) Nam Ji-sung / (South Korea) Song Min-kyu
- International Challenger Baotou

The 2019 International Challenger Baotou was a professional tennis tournament played on clay courts. It was the first edition of the tournament which was part of the 2019 ATP Challenger Tour. It took place in Baotou, China between 26 August and 1 September 2019.

== Singles main-draw entrants ==
=== Seeds ===
Country	Player	Rank^{1}	Seed
AUS	James Duckworth	132	1
~~CAN~~	~~Steven Diez~~	~~175~~	~~2~~
SRB	Peđa Krstin	209	3
CHN	Bai Yan	221	4
ESP	Roberto Ortega Olmedo	241	5
JPN	Kaichi Uchida	256	6
POR	Gonçalo Oliveira	261	7
TPE	Wu Tung-lin	265	8
AUS	Aleksandar Vukic	274	9
FRA	Baptiste Crepatte	276	10
POR	Frederico Ferreira Silva	284	11
IND	Sasikumar Mukund	285	12
TPE	Yang Tsung-hua	296	13
KOR	Nam Ji-sung	297	14
AUS	Harry Bourchier	357	15
RUS	Teymuraz Gabashvili	359	16
TPE	Tseng Chun-hsin	360	17

- ^{1} Rankings are as of 19 August 2019.

=== Other entrants ===
The following players received wildcards into the singles main draw:

- (China) Hua Runhao
- (China) Liu Hanyi
- (China) Wang Chuhan
- (China) Wang Chukang
- (China) Wang Huixin

The following players received entry into the singles main draw as alternates:

- (South Korea) Chung Hong
- (United States) John Paul Fruttero

== Champions ==
=== Singles ===
- (Australia) James Duckworth def. (India) Sasikumar Mukund 6–4, 6–3.

=== Doubles ===
- (South Korea) Nam Ji-sung / (South Korea) Song Min-kyu def. (Russia) Teymuraz Gabashvili / (India) Sasikumar Mukund 7–6^{(7–3)}, 6–2.
