= 2019 International Challenger Baotou – Singles =

Singles
- 2019 International Challenger Baotou

Final
- Champion: (Australia) James Duckworth
- Runner-up: (India) Sasikumar Mukund
- Score: 6–4, 6–3

Events
Singles	Doubles
- International Challenger Baotou

This was the first edition of the tournament.

James Duckworth won the title after defeating Sasikumar Mukund 6–4, 6–3 in the final.

== Seeds ==
All seeds receive a bye into the second round.

1. (Australia) James Duckworth (champion)
2. (Canada) Steven Diez (withdrew)
3. (Serbia) Peđa Krstin (quarterfinals, retired)
4. (China) Bai Yan (quarterfinals)
5. (Spain) Roberto Ortega Olmedo (third round)
6. (Japan) Kaichi Uchida (third round)
7. (Portugal) Gonçalo Oliveira (quarterfinals, retired)
8. (Chinese Taipei) Wu Tung-lin (semifinals)
9. (Australia) Aleksandar Vukic (third round)
10. (France) Baptiste Crepatte (second round)
11. (Portugal) Frederico Ferreira Silva (semifinals)
12. (India) Sasikumar Mukund (final)
13. (Chinese Taipei) Yang Tsung-hua (third round)
14. (South Korea) Nam Ji-sung (third round)
15. (Australia) Harry Bourchier (quarterfinals)
16. (Russia) Teymuraz Gabashvili (second round)
17. (Chinese Taipei) Tseng Chun-hsin (third round)

== Draw ==
Key

- Q = Qualifier
- WC = Wild card
- LL = Lucky loser
- Alt = Alternate
- ITF = ITF entry
- PR = Protected ranking
- SR = Special ranking
- SE = Special exempt
- JE = Junior exempt
- JR = Junior Accelerator Programme entrant
- CO = College Accelerator Programme entrant
- NG = Next Gen Accelerator Program entrant
- w/o = Walkover
- r = Retired
- d = Defaulted

=== Finals ===
Quarterfinals
1	(Australia) James Duckworth	5
7	(Portugal) Gonçalo Oliveira	0^{r}
3	(Serbia) Peđa Krstin	3	1^{r}
11	(Portugal) Frederico Ferreira Silva	6	4
8	(Chinese Taipei) Wu Tung-lin	6	7^{7}
4	(China) Bai Yan	2	6^{4}
12	(India) Sasikumar Mukund	4	6	7^{7}
15	(Australia) Harry Bourchier	6	1	6^{3}

Semifinals
1	(Australia) James Duckworth	6	6
11	(Portugal) Frederico Ferreira Silva	3	4
8	(Chinese Taipei) Wu Tung-lin	5	3
12	(India) Sasikumar Mukund	7	6

Final
1	(Australia) James Duckworth	6	6
12	(India) Sasikumar Mukund	4	3

=== Top half ===
==== Section 1 ====
First round
(South Korea) M-k Song	6	7^{7}
(Australia) L Saville	4	6^{5}
(Japan) K Takeuchi	6	3	4
(Serbia) M Zekić	4	6	6
(Japan) Renta Tokuda	5	1
(Switzerland) L Castelnuovo	7	6

Second round
1	(Australia) J Duckworth	6	6
(South Korea) M-k Song	1	4
(Serbia) M Zekić	3	7	1
13	(Chinese Taipei) T-h Yang	6	5	6
9	(Australia) A Vukic	6	6
(Japan) Makoto Ochi	4	3
(Switzerland) L Castelnuovo	4	4
7	(Portugal) G Oliveira	6	6

Third round
1	(Australia) J Duckworth	3	7^{7}	6
13	(Chinese Taipei) T-h Yang	6	6^{4}	1
9	(Australia) A Vukic	4	6	0
7	(Portugal) G Oliveira	6	3	6

Quarterfinals
1	(Australia) J Duckworth	5
7	(Portugal) G Oliveira	0^{r}

==== Section 2 ====
First round
Alt	(United States) JP Fruttero	5	2
WC	(China) R Hua	7	6
(Japan) Y Takahashi	7	6
(New Zealand) R Purcell	5	3
(Monaco) L Catarina	6	2	3
(France) M Hamou	3	6	6

Second round
3	(Serbia) P Krstin	6	6^{5}	6
(United States) Evan Song	2	7^{7}	3
WC	(China) R Hua	6	3	7^{15}
16	(Russia) T Gabashvili	3	6	6^{13}
11	(Portugal) F Ferreira Silva	6	6
(Japan) Y Takahashi	3	0
(France) M Hamou	6^{5}	6^{2}
5	(Spain) R Ortega Olmedo	7^{7}	7^{7}

Third round
3	(Serbia) P Krstin	6	6
WC	(China) R Hua	4	2
11	(Portugal) F Ferreira Silva	6	6
5	(Spain) R Ortega Olmedo	1	1

Quarterfinals
3	(Serbia) P Krstin	3	1^{r}
11	(Portugal) F Ferreira Silva	6	4

=== Bottom half ===
==== Section 3 ====
First round
(Australia) Jacob Grills	6^{6}	4
(China) D Wu	7^{8}	6
WC	(China) Wang Chukang	1	0
(China) Zh Zhang	6	6
WC	(China) Wang Huixin	3	6^{3}
(India) A Kadhe	6	7^{7}
WC	(China) Liu Hanyi	4	1
(China) F Sun	6	6

Second round
8	(Chinese Taipei) T-l Wu	3	6	7
(China) D Wu	6	1	5
(China) Zh Zhang	6	6
10	(France) Baptiste Crepatte	4	2
14	(South Korea) J-s Nam	6	6
(India) A Kadhe	3	3
(China) F Sun	4	3
4	(China) Y Bai	6	6

Third round
8	(Chinese Taipei) T-l Wu	6	6
(China) Zh Zhang	3	4
14	(South Korea) J-s Nam	3	6	5
4	(China) Y Bai	6	4	7

Quarterfinals
8	(Chinese Taipei) T-l Wu	6	7^{7}
4	(China) Y Bai	2	6^{4}

==== Section 4 ====
First round
(China) J Cui	5	5
(India) Sidharth Rawat	7	7
Alt	(South Korea) Ho Chung	2	3
(Russia) I Nedelko	6	6

Second round
6	(Japan) K Uchida	6	7^{7}
WC	(China) Chuh Wang	2	6^{4}
(Japan) Jumpei Yamasaki	0	2
12	(India) S Mukund	6	6
15	(Australia) H Bourchier	7	6
(India) S Rawat	5	2
(Russia) I Nedelko	3	3
17	(Chinese Taipei) C-h Tseng	6	6

Third round
6	(Japan) K Uchida	6^{3}	2
12	(India) S Mukund	7^{7}	6
15	(Australia) H Bourchier	6	4	6
17	(Chinese Taipei) C-h Tseng	3	6	4

Quarterfinals
12	(India) S Mukund	4	6	7^{7}
15	(Australia) H Bourchier	6	1	6^{3}
