= 2024 Shenzhen Luohu Challenger – Doubles =

Doubles
- 2024 Shenzhen Luohu Challenger

Final
- Champions: (Japan) Yuta Shimizu (Japan) James Trotter
- Runners-up: (China) Wang Aoran (China) Zhou Yi
- Score: 7–6^{(7–5)}, 7–6^{(7–4)}

Events
Singles	Doubles
← 2023 ·	Shenzhen Luohu Challenger	· 2025 →

Gao Xin and Wang Aoran were the defending champions but only Wang chose to defend his title, partnering Zhou Yi. He lost in the final to Yuta Shimizu and James Trotter.

Shimizu and Trotter won the title after defeating Wang and Zhou 7–6^{(7–5)}, 7–6^{(7–4)} in the final.

== Seeds ==
1. (Poland) Piotr Matuszewski / (Australia) Matthew Romios (quarterfinals)
2. (South Korea) Nam Ji-sung / (Finland) Patrik Niklas-Salminen (semifinals)
3. (Japan) Toshihide Matsui / (Japan) Kaito Uesugi (first round)
4. (Chinese Taipei) Ray Ho / (India) Ramkumar Ramanathan (first round)

== Draw ==
=== Key ===
- Q = Qualifier
- WC = Wild card
- LL = Lucky loser
- Alt = Alternate
- SE = Special exempt
- PR = Protected ranking
- ITF = ITF entry
- JE = Junior exempt
- w/o = Walkover
- r = Retired
- d = Defaulted
- SR = Special ranking

=== Draw ===
First round
1	(Poland) P Matuszewski (Australia) MC Romios	7	2	[10]
(Philippines) FC Alcantara (China) F Sun	5	6	[6]
(Australia) A Santillan (New Zealand) R Statham	3	3
WC	(China) A Wang (China) Y Zhou	6	6
4	(Chinese Taipei) R Ho (India) R Ramanathan	4	3
(Switzerland) R Bertola (France) A Escoffier	6	6
(Australia) L Saville (Australia) L Tu	3	6	[11]
Alt	(Japan) H Moriya (Japan) R Noguchi	6	2	[9]
(Italy) M Bellucci (Tunisia) M Echargui	6	1	[10]
(Ukraine) I Marchenko (Kazakhstan) D Yevseyev	3	6	[5]
(Japan) Y Shimizu (Japan) J Trotter	6	6
3	(Japan) T Matsui (Japan) K Uesugi	2	4
(Australia) B Bayldon (Thailand) P Isaro	3	4
WC	(China) Y Bu (China) Zeng Yaojie	6	6
Mikalai Haliak (Australia) P Sekulic	6	4	[4]
2	(South Korea) J-s Nam (Finland) P Niklas-Salminen	4	6	[10]

Quarterfinals
1	(Poland) P Matuszewski (Australia) MC Romios	4	4
WC	(China) A Wang (China) Y Zhou	6	6
(Switzerland) R Bertola (France) A Escoffier	6	7^{7}
(Australia) L Saville (Australia) L Tu	4	6^{5}
(Italy) M Bellucci (Tunisia) M Echargui
(Japan) Y Shimizu (Japan) J Trotter	w/o
WC	(China) Y Bu (China) Y Zeng	4	6	[1]
2	(South Korea) J-s Nam (Finland) P Niklas-Salminen	6	3	[10]

Semifinals
WC	(China) A Wang (China) Y Zhou	4	7	[10]
(Switzerland) R Bertola (France) A Escoffier	6	5	[6]
(Japan) Y Shimizu (Japan) J Trotter	6	7
2	(South Korea) J-s Nam (Finland) P Niklas-Salminen	3	5

Final
WC	(China) A Wang (China) Y Zhou	6^{5}	6^{4}
(Japan) Y Shimizu (Japan) J Trotter	7^{7}	7^{7}
