= 2016 KPN Renewables Bangkok Open – Doubles =

Doubles
- 2016 KPN Renewables Bangkok Open

Final
- Champions: (Chinese Taipei) Chen Ti (Chinese Taipei) Jason Jung
- Runners-up: (South Africa) Dean O'Brien (South Africa) Ruan Roelofse
- Score: 6–4, 3–6, [10–8]

Events
| Singles | Doubles |
- KPN Renewables Bangkok Open

This was the first edition of the tournament.

Chen Ti and Jason Jung won the title after defeating Dean O'Brien and Ruan Roelofse 6–4, 3–6, [10–8] in the final.

== Seeds ==
1. (Thailand) Sanchai Ratiwatana / (Thailand) Sonchat Ratiwatana (first round)
2. (South Africa) Dean O'Brien / (South Africa) Ruan Roelofse (final)
3. (United States) James Cerretani / (United States) Max Schnur (quarterfinals)
4. (China) Gong Maoxin / (Chinese Taipei) Yi Chu-huan (quarterfinals)

== Draw ==
Key

- Q = Qualifier
- WC = Wild card
- LL = Lucky loser
- Alt = Alternate
- ITF = ITF entry
- PR = Protected ranking
- SR = Special ranking
- SE = Special exempt
- JE = Junior exempt
- JR = Junior Accelerator Programme entrant
- CO = College Accelerator Programme entrant
- NG = Next Gen Accelerator Program entrant
- w/o = Walkover
- r = Retired
- d = Defaulted

=== Draw ===
First round
1 | (Thailand) Sa Ratiwatana (Thailand) So Ratiwatana | 3 | 7^{7} | [6]
(Japan) T Matsui (Japan) Y Sugita | 6 | 6^{3} | [10]
(Australia) M Reid (Australia) A Whittington | 6 | 6
WC | (Thailand) Punn Bodhidatta (Thailand) Suthinan Tanthaseraneewat | 2 | 1
4 | (China) M Gong (Chinese Taipei) C-h Yi | 6 | 7^{13}
(India) J Nedunchezhiyan (India) S Singh | 3 | 6^{11}
(South Africa) L Harris (Japan) Y Uchiyama | 7^{9} | 3 | [1]
(Chinese Taipei) T Chen (Chinese Taipei) J Jung | 6^{7} | 6 | [10]
(United States) S Bangoura (New Zealand) J Statham | 0 | 2
(Chinese Taipei) H-y Peng (China) Z Zhang | 6 | 6
(Argentina) JI Londero (Argentina) A Velotti | 4 | 3
3 | (United States) J Cerretani (United States) M Schnur | 6 | 6
WC | (Thailand) Phassawit Burapharitta (Thailand) Congsup Congcar | 6^{3} | 4
WC | (Thailand) W Trongcharoenchaikul (Thailand) K Wachiramanowong | 7^{7} | 6
(United States) M Krueger (United States) Connor Smith | 4 | 6 | [9]
2 | (South Africa) D O'Brien (South Africa) R Roelofse | 6 | 4 | [11]

Quarterfinals
(Japan) T Matsui (Japan) Y Sugita | 6 | 7
(Australia) M Reid (Australia) A Whittington | 2 | 5
4 | (China) M Gong (Chinese Taipei) C-h Yi | 6 | 1 | [4]
(Chinese Taipei) T Chen (Chinese Taipei) J Jung | 3 | 6 | [10]
(Chinese Taipei) H-y Peng (China) Z Zhang | 6 | 6
3 | (United States) J Cerretani (United States) M Schnur | 2 | 3
WC | (Thailand) W Trongcharoenchaikul (Thailand) K Wachiramanowong | 2 | 3
2 | (South Africa) D O'Brien (South Africa) R Roelofse | 6 | 6

Semifinals
(Japan) T Matsui (Japan) Y Sugita | 6^{5} | 2
(Chinese Taipei) T Chen (Chinese Taipei) J Jung | 7^{7} | 6
(Chinese Taipei) H-y Peng (China) Z Zhang | 4 | 6 | [11]
2 | (South Africa) D O'Brien (South Africa) R Roelofse | 6 | 3 | [13]

Final
(Chinese Taipei) T Chen (Chinese Taipei) J Jung | 6 | 3 | [10]
2 | (South Africa) D O'Brien (South Africa) R Roelofse | 4 | 6 | [8]
