= 2023 Shenzhen Luohu Challenger – Doubles =

Doubles
- 2023 Shenzhen Luohu Challenger

Final
- Champions: (China) Gao Xin (China) Wang Aoran
- Runners-up: Mikalai Haliak (Greece) Markos Kalovelonis
- Score: 6–4, 6–2

Events
| Singles | Doubles |
| Shenzhen Luohu Challenger | · 2024 → |

This was the first edition of the tournament.

Gao Xin and Wang Aoran won the title after defeating Mikalai Haliak and Markos Kalovelonis 6–4, 6–2 in the final.

== Seeds ==
1. (Poland) Piotr Matuszewski / (Australia) Matthew Romios (quarterfinals)
2. (Zimbabwe) Benjamin Lock / (New Zealand) Rubin Statham (semifinals)
3. (Philippines) Francis Alcantara / (China) Sun Fajing (semifinals)
4. (Australia) Luke Saville / (Australia) Li Tu (withdrew)

== Draw ==
=== Key ===
- Q = Qualifier
- WC = Wild card
- LL = Lucky loser
- Alt = Alternate
- ITF = ITF entry
- PR = Protected ranking
- SR = Special ranking
- SE = Special exempt
- JE = Junior exempt
- JR = Junior Accelerator Programme entrant
- CO = College Accelerator Programme entrant
- NG = Next Gen Accelerator Program entrant
- w/o = Walkover
- r = Retired
- d = Defaulted

First round
1 | (Poland) P Matuszewski (Australia) MC Romios | 4 | 7 | [10]
(China) J Cui (Chinese Taipei) T-h Huang | 6 | 5 | [6]
(Chinese Taipei) R Ho (Kazakhstan) B Zhukayev | 4 | 4
(China) X Gao (China) A Wang | 6 | 6
3 | (Philippines) FC Alcantara (China) F Sun | 6 | 6
WC | (China) Wang Chukang (Germany) Jimmy Yang | 4 | 4
(China) Sun Qian (China) S Tang | 7 | 6^{9} | [13]
WC | (China) Wang Xiaofei (China) Xiao Linang | 5 | 7^{11} | [15]
(Canada) S Diez (France) A Weber | 2 | 3
Mikalai Haliak (Greece) M Kalovelonis | 6 | 6
(China) Y Bu (China) R Te | 6 | 7^{7}
Alt | (Japan) Yuichiro Inui (Japan) Tomohiro Masabayashi | 0 | 6^{1}
Alt | (China) Y Mo (China) Zeng Yaojie | 2 | 6^{5}
(Indonesia) J Barki (Northern Mariana Islands) C Sinclair | 6 | 7^{7}
(China) Z Li (Hong Kong) C Wong | 6 | 5 | [9]
2 | (Zimbabwe) B Lock (New Zealand) R Statham | 3 | 7 | [11]

Quarterfinals
1 | (Poland) P Matuszewski (Australia) MC Romios | 4 | 6 | [7]
(China) X Gao (China) A Wang | 6 | 3 | [10]
3 | (Philippines) FC Alcantara (China) F Sun | 6 | 6
WC | (China) X Wang (China) L Xiao | 1 | 3
M Haliak (Greece) M Kalovelonis | 6 | 2 | [10]
(China) Y Bu (China) R Te | 2 | 6 | [5]
(Indonesia) J Barki (Northern Mariana Islands) C Sinclair | 6^{5} | 3
2 | (Zimbabwe) B Lock (New Zealand) R Statham | 7^{7} | 6

Semifinals
(China) X Gao (China) A Wang | 7^{10} | 6
3 | (Philippines) FC Alcantara (China) F Sun | 6^{8} | 3
M Haliak (Greece) M Kalovelonis | 7^{7} | 6
2 | (Zimbabwe) B Lock (New Zealand) R Statham | 6^{2} | 2

Final
(China) X Gao (China) A Wang | 6 | 6
M Haliak (Greece) M Kalovelonis | 4 | 2
