= 2023 Shenzhen Luohu Challenger =

- Date: 16–22 October
- Edition: 1st
- Surface: Hard
- Location: Shenzhen, China

Champions

Singles
- (Australia) James Duckworth

Doubles
- (China) Gao Xin / (China) Wang Aoran
Shenzhen Luohu Challenger	· 2024 →

The 2023 Shenzhen Luohu Challenger was a professional tennis tournament played on hardcourts. It was the first edition of the tournament which was part of the 2023 ATP Challenger Tour. It took place in Shenzhen, China between 16 and 22 October 2023.

== Singles main-draw entrants ==
=== Seeds ===
Country	Player	Rank^{1}	Seed
AUS	James Duckworth	139	1
USA	Aleksandar Kovacevic	146	2
FRA	Térence Atmane	148	3
CHN	Bu Yunchaokete	186	4
AUS	Li Tu	200	5
	Evgeny Donskoy	233	6
KAZ	Denis Yevseyev	260	7
CAN	Steven Diez	269	8

- ^{1} Rankings are as of 2 October 2023.

=== Other entrants ===
The following players received wildcards into the singles main draw:

- (China) Bai Yan
- (China) Charles Chen
- (China) Wang Xiaofei

The following player received entry into the singles main draw as a special exempt:

- (United States) Aleksandar Kovacevic

The following player received entry into the singles main draw as an alternate:

- (China) Te Rigele

The following players received entry from the qualifying draw:

- Egor Gerasimov
- (Chinese Taipei) Huang Tsung-hao
- (China) Li Zhe
- (China) Mo Yecong
- (Thailand) Wishaya Trongcharoenchaikul
- (China) Xiao Linang

== Champions ==
=== Singles ===
- (Australia) James Duckworth def. (Hong Kong) Coleman Wong 6–0, 6–1.

=== Doubles ===
- (China) Gao Xin / (China) Wang Aoran def. Mikalai Haliak / (Greece) Markos Kalovelonis 6–4, 6–2.
