= 2016 KPN Renewables Bangkok Open =

- Date: 16–22 May
- Edition: 1st
- Draw: 32S / 16D
- Prize money: $50,000
- Surface: Hard
- Location: Bangkok, Thailand

Champions

Singles
- (Australia) James Duckworth

Doubles
- (Chinese Taipei) Chen Ti / (Chinese Taipei) Jason Jung
KPN Renewables Bangkok Open

The 2016 KPN Renewables Bangkok Open was a professional tennis tournament played on hard courts. It was the first edition of the tournament which was part of the 2016 ATP Challenger Tour. It took place in Bangkok, Thailand between 16 and 22 May 2016.

== Singles main-draw entrants ==
=== Seeds ===
Country	Player	Rank^{1}	Seed
AUS	Sam Groth	97	1
TPE	Lu Yen-hsun	108	2
JPN	Yūichi Sugita	109	3
SVK	Lukáš Lacko	121	4
AUS	John-Patrick Smith	153	5
USA	Alexander Sarkissian	166	6
CHN	Zhang Ze	179	7
AUS	James Duckworth	209	8

- ^{1} Rankings are as of May 9, 2016.

=== Other entrants ===
The following players received wildcards into the singles main draw:

- (Thailand) Phassawit Burapharitta
- (Thailand) Jirat Navasirisomboon
- (Thailand) Wishaya Trongcharoenchaikul
- (Thailand) Kittipong Wachiramanowong

The following player received protected ranking entry into the singles main draw:

- (France) Rémi Boutillier

The following players received entry from the qualifying draw:

- (Republic of Ireland) Sam Barry
- (United Kingdom) Lloyd Glasspool
- (Japan) Yuya Kibi
- (India) Sidharth Rawat

== Champions ==
=== Singles ===
- (Australia) James Duckworth def. (Republic of Ireland) Sam Barry, 7–6^{(7–5)}, 6–4

=== Doubles ===
- (Chinese Taipei) Chen Ti / (Chinese Taipei) Jason Jung def. (South Africa) Dean O'Brien / (South Africa) Ruan Roelofse, 6–4, 3–6, [10–8]
