= 2024 Shenzhen Luohu Challenger – Singles =

Singles
- 2024 Shenzhen Luohu Challenger

Final
- Champion: (South Africa) Lloyd Harris
- Runner-up: (Australia) James Duckworth
- Score: 6–3, 6–3

Events
Singles	Doubles
- Shenzhen Luohu Challenger

James Duckworth was the defending champion but lost to Lloyd Harris 6–3, 6–3 in the final.

== Seeds ==
1. (Australia) James Duckworth (final)
2. (Australia) Adam Walton (withdrew)
3. (Japan) Yasutaka Uchiyama (first round, retired)
4. (South Africa) Lloyd Harris (champion)
5. (Italy) Mattia Bellucci (quarterfinals)
6. (Kazakhstan) Denis Yevseyev (quarterfinals)
7. (China) Bu Yunchaokete (withdrew)
8. (Hong Kong) Coleman Wong (second round)
9. (Australia) Li Tu (first round)

== Draw ==
Key

- Q = Qualifier
- WC = Wild card
- LL = Lucky loser
- Alt = Alternate
- ITF = ITF entry
- PR = Protected ranking
- SR = Special ranking
- SE = Special exempt
- JE = Junior exempt
- JR = Junior Accelerator Programme entrant
- CO = College Accelerator Programme entrant
- NG = Next Gen Accelerator Program entrant
- w/o = Walkover
- r = Retired
- d = Defaulted

=== Finals ===
Semifinals
1	(Australia) James Duckworth	6	6
Q	(Switzerland) Rémy Bertola	3	2
4	(South Africa) Lloyd Harris	6	6
(Estonia) Mark Lajal	2	4

Final
1	(Australia) James Duckworth	3	3
4	(South Africa) Lloyd Harris	6	6

=== Top half ===
First round
1	(Australia) J Duckworth	7	6
WC	(China) R Te	5	2
Alt	(Australia) L Saville	4	2
(France) A Escoffier	6	6
(France) Jules Marie	6	3	6
WC	(China) F Sun	1	6	4
(Ukraine) I Marchenko	3	4
5	(Italy) M Bellucci	6	6
3	(Japan) Y Uchiyama	0	1^{r}
(Australia) T Schoolkate	6	3
Q	(Japan) R Noguchi	6	3	6^{5}
(Australia) A Bolt	2	6	7^{7}
Q	(Switzerland) R Bertola	7^{8}	6
(Japan) Y Shimizu	6^{6}	3
Q	(Japan) J Trotter	5	2
8	(Hong Kong) C Wong	7	6

Second round
1	(Australia) J Duckworth	6	6
(France) A Escoffier	4	3
(France) J Marie	5	2
5	(Italy) M Bellucci	7	6
(Australia) T Schoolkate	6	6
(Australia) A Bolt	2	2
Q	(Switzerland) R Bertola	6	6
8	(Hong Kong) C Wong	4	4

Quarterfinals
1	(Australia) J Duckworth	4	6	7^{7}
5	(Italy) M Bellucci	6	3	6^{4}
(Australia) T Schoolkate	4	2
Q	(Switzerland) R Bertola	6	6

Semifinals
1	(Australia) J Duckworth	6	6
Q	(Switzerland) R Bertola	3	2

=== Bottom half ===
First round
LL	(Japan) H Moriya	2	3
Alt	A Kachmazov	6	6
Q	(Australia) J McCabe	6	6^{0}	6
(Chinese Taipei) T-l Wu	1	7^{7}	2
(Chinese Taipei) Y-h Hsu	7	6^{4}	6
WC	(China) Y Zhou	5	7^{7}	3
(Australia) D Sweeny	2	2
4	(South Africa) L Harris	6	6
6	(Kazakhstan) D Yevseyev	3	6	6
Q	(Turkey) A Çelikbilek	6	1	4
Alt	(Australia) P Sekulic	6	4	6
(Italy) F Cinà	4	6	4
(United Kingdom) A Fery	2	6	6
Q	(Lithuania) R Berankis	6	1	2
(Estonia) M Lajal	6	4	6
9	(Australia) L Tu	3	6	4

Second round
Alt	A Kachmazov	6	6
Q	(Australia) J McCabe	3	4
(Chinese Taipei) Y-h Hsu	4	4
4	(South Africa) L Harris	6	6
6	(Kazakhstan) D Yevseyev	7^{7}	6
Alt	(Australia) P Sekulic	6^{3}	3
(United Kingdom) A Fery	2	2
(Estonia) M Lajal	6	6

Quarterfinals
Alt	A Kachmazov	3	6	3
4	(South Africa) L Harris	6	4	6
6	(Kazakhstan) D Yevseyev	5	6^{4}
(Estonia) M Lajal	7	7^{7}

Semifinals
4	(South Africa) L Harris	6	6
(Estonia) M Lajal	2	4
