= Wang Aoran =

Chinese tennis player

Wang Aoran 王傲然
- Country (sports): China
- Born: 5 February 1997 (age 29) Dalian, China
- Plays: Right-handed (two handed-backhand)
- Prize money: US $154,657

Singles
- Career record: 0–0 (at ATP Tour level, Grand Slam level, and in Davis Cup)
- Career titles: 0
- Highest ranking: No. 712 (1 July 2024)
- Current ranking: No. 912 (6 April 2026)

Doubles
- Career record: 1–7 (at ATP Tour level, Grand Slam level, and in Davis Cup)
- Career titles: 0; 2 Challengers
- Highest ranking: No. 175 (9 June 2025)
- Current ranking: No. 276 (6 April 2026)
- Last updated on: 12 April 2026.

Wang Aoran (Chinese: 王傲然; pinyin: Wáng Àorán; Mandarin pronunciation: [wǎŋ âʊ ɻǎn]; born 5 February 1997) is a Chinese tennis player. Wang has a career-high ATP singles ranking of No. 712 achieved on 1 July 2024 and a career-high ATP doubles ranking of No. 175 achieved on 9 June 2025.

== Career ==
Wang made his ATP Tour main-draw debut at the 2014 ATP Shenzhen Open, in the doubles draw partnering Ouyang Bowen.

He received a wildcard for the 2023 China Open in the doubles event partnering Cui Jie.

== ATP Challenger Tour finals ==
=== Doubles: 5 (2 titles, 3 runner-ups) ===
Legend ATP Challenger Tour (2–3)

Result	W–L	Date	Tournament	Tier	Surface	Partner	Opponents	Score
Win	1–0	Oct 2023	Shenzhen, China	Challenger	Hard	(China) Gao Xin	Mikalai Haliak (Greece) Markos Kalovelonis	6–4, 6–2
Loss	1–1	Apr 2024	Shenzhen, China	Challenger	Hard	(China) Zhou Yi	(Japan) Yuta Shimizu (Japan) James Trotter	6–7^{(5–7)}, 6–7^{(4–7)}
Win	2–1	Oct 2024	Shenzhen, China	Challenger	Hard	(Thailand) Pruchya Isaro	(Chinese Taipei) Ray Ho (United Kingdom) Joshua Paris	7–6^{(7–4)}, 6–3
Loss	2–2	Jan 2025	Nonthaburi, Thailand	Challenger	Hard	(Thailand) Pruchya Isaro	(Chinese Taipei) Ray Ho (Austria) Neil Oberleitner	3–6, 4–6
Loss	2–3	Aug 2025	Zhangjiagang, China	Challenger	Hard	(Australia) Joshua Charlton	(South Korea) Nam Ji-sung (South Korea) Park Ui-sung	3–6, 6–4, [11–13]

== ITF Futures/World Tennis Tour finals ==
=== Singles: 1 (1 runner-up) ===
Legend ITF WTT (0–1)

Result	W–L	Date	Tournament	Tier	Surface	Opponent	Score
Loss	0–1	Jun 2023	M15 Tianjin, China	WTT	Hard	(China) Bai Yan	2–6, ret

=== Doubles: 30 (18 titles, 12 runner-ups) ===
Legend ITF Futures/WTT (18–12)	Finals by surface Hard (15–10) Clay (3–2) Grass (0–0) Carpet (0–0)

Result	W–L	Date	Tournament	Tier	Surface	Partner	Opponents	Score
Loss	0–1	Feb 2016	China F2, Anning	Futures	Clay	(China) Sun Fajing	(Chinese Taipei) Lin Hsin (Spain) Enrique López Pérez	walkover
Loss	0–2	Apr 2016	China F5, Taizhou	Futures	Hard	(Philippines) Jeson Patrombon	(Indonesia) Christopher Rungkat (India) N. Vijay Sundar Prashanth	4–6, 0–6
Loss	0–3	Jul 2016	China F10, Longyan	Futures	Hard	(China) Sun Fajing	(China) Bai Yan (China) Li Zhe	6–7^{(1-7)}, 4–6
Win	1–3	Jul 2016	China F11, Anning	Futures	Clay	(China) Sun Fajing	(China) Ning Yuqing (China) Qiu Zhuoyang	6–3, 6–4
Win	2–3	Aug 2016	Indonesia F1, Jakarta	Futures	Hard	(Chinese Taipei) Huang Liang-chi	(India) N.Sriram Balaji (India) Vishnu Vardhan	6–3, 4–6, [12–10]
Win	3–3	Oct 2016	Vietnam F7, Thu Dau Mot City	Futures	Hard	(China) Chang Yu	(Philippines) Francis Casey Alcantara (Indonesia) David Agung Susanto	5–7, 6–3, [10–5]
Loss	3–4	Jul 2017	China F14, Tianjin	Futures	Hard	(Chinese Taipei) Huang Liang-chi	(Japan) Hiroyasu Ehara (Japan) Sho Katayama	3–6, 3–6
Win	4–4	Oct 2017	Malaysia F2, Kuala Lumpur	Futures	Hard	(Uzbekistan) Jurabek Karimov	(Italy) Francesco Vilardo (Guatemala) Wilfredo González	6–4, 6–1
Win	5–4	Nov 2017	Malaysia F3, Kuala Lumpur	Futures	Hard	(Uzbekistan) Jurabek Karimov	(Japan) Yuichi Ito (Thailand) Nuttanon Kadchapanan	7–6^{(7-5)}, 6–4
Win	6–4	Jan 2018	China F1, Anning	Futures	Clay	(China) Te Rigele	(Japan) Yuta Shimizu (Japan) Shinji Hazawa	7–5, 7–6^{(7-3)},
Loss	6–5	Jul 2018	China F9, Shenzhen	Futures	Hard	(China) Gao Xin	(South Korea) Nam Ji-sung (South Korea) Song Min-kyu	6–3, 4–6, [4–10]
Win	7–5	Aug 2018	China F12, Anning	Futures	Clay	(China) Wu Hao	(Australia) Jeremy Beale (New Zealand) Rhett Purcell	7–6^{(7-4)}, 3–6, [12–10]
Loss	7–6	Dec 2018	Hong Kong F3	Futures	Hard	(China) Gao Xin	(Japan) Shintaro Imai (Chinese Taipei) Hsu Yu-hsiou	6–7^{(1–7)}, 1–6
Win	8–6	Jun 2019	M25 Luzhou, China	WTT	Hard	(China) Wu Hao	(China) Sun Fajing (China) Gao Xin	3–6, 6–1, [10–5]
Win	9–6	Jun 2019	M25 Shenzhen, China	WTT	Hard	(New Zealand) Rhett Purcell	(China) Gao Qu (China) Wang Ruikai	6–3, 7–5
Loss	9–7	Aug 2019	M15 Vigo, Spain	WTT	Clay	(China) Gao Xin	(Brazil) Oscar Jose Gutierrez (Brazil) Rafael Matos	5–7, 2–6
Loss	9–8	May 2022	M15 Monastir, Tunisia	WTT	Hard	(China) Bu Yunchaokete	(Spain) Alberto Barroso Campos (Chinese Taipei) Ray Ho	2–6, 6–4, [5–10]
Win	10–8	May 2022	M15 Monastir, Tunisia	WTT	Hard	(China) Bu Yunchaokete	(Japan) Kazuma Kawachi (Japan) Ryuki Matsuda	6–2, 7–6^{(7–2)}
Win	11–8	Mar 2023	M15 Monastir, Tunisia	WTT	Hard	(China) Gao Xin	(Greece) Dimitris Sakellaridis (Greece) Stefanos Sakellaridis	6–2, 6–4
Win	12–8	Jun 2023	M15 Tianjin, China	WTT	Hard	(China) Li Zhe	(China) Bai Yan (China) Dong Zhenxiong	6–4, 6–2
Win	13–8	Jun 2023	M15 Tianjin, China	WTT	Hard	(Switzerland) Luca Castelnuovo	(China) Yu Bingyu (China) Zheng Zhan	7–6^{(7–2)}, 6–3
Win	14–8	Jun 2023	M15 Tianjin, China	WTT	Hard	(Switzerland) Luca Castelnuovo	(China) Sun Qian (China) Xiao Linang	7–6^{(7–5)}, 6–0
Win	15–8	Jul 2023	M15 Shanghai, China	WTT	Hard	(Switzerland) Luca Castelnuovo	Erik Arutiunian; Daniil Ostapenkov	6–1, 7–5
Win	16–8	Aug 2024	M25 Yinchuan, China	WTT	Hard	(New Zealand) Ajeet Rai	(South Africa) Kris van Wyk (South Africa) Philip Henning	6–4, 6–4
Loss	16–9	Dec 2024	M15 Denpasar, Indonesia	WTT	Hard	(Switzerland) Luca Castelnuovo	(Japan) Yusuke Kusuhara (Japan) Shunsuke Nakagawa	2–6, 1–0 ret.
Loss	16–10	Jan 2025	M15 Sharm El Sheikh, Egypt	WTT	Hard	(China) Wang Yukun	(Egypt) Akram El Sallaly (Netherlands) Jarno Jans	4–6, 2–6
Loss	16–11	Jul 2025	M15 Ma'anshan, China	WTT	Hard (i)	(China) Zhang Changli	(Australia) Akira Santillan (China) Yang Mingyuan	2–6, 3–6
Loss	16–12	Mar 2026	M15 Ma'anshan, China	WTT	Hard (i)	(China) Chen Xianfeng	(Uzbekistan) Sergey Fomin (Uzbekistan) Maxim Shin	7–6, 4–6, [5–10]
Win	17–12	Mar 2026	M25 Luzhou, China	WTT	Hard	(Australia) Joshua Charlton	(Chinese Taipei) Jeffrey Hsu (Thailand) Wishaya Trongcharoenchaikul	6–7^{(5–7)}, 6–2, [11–9]
Win	18–12	Jun 2026	M25 Ma'anshan, China	WTT	Hard	(Australia) Joshua Charlton	(China) Jin Yuquan (China) Sun Qian	6–3, 6–4
