= International Challenger Baotou =

- 2019 International Challenger Baotou

Defunct tennis tournament
- Event name: International Challenger Baotou
- Location: Baotou, China
- Category: ATP Challenger Tour
- Surface: Clay (indoor)
- Draw: 48S/4Q/16D

The International Challenger Baotou was a professional tennis tournament played on clay courts. It was part of the ATP Challenger Tour. It was held annually in Baotou, China in 2019.

== Past finals ==
=== Singles ===
Year	Champion	Runner-up	Score
2019	(Australia) James Duckworth	(India) Sasikumar Mukund	6–4, 6–3

=== Doubles ===
Year	Champions	Runners-up	Score
2019	(South Korea) Nam Ji-sung (South Korea) Song Min-kyu	(Russia) Teymuraz Gabashvili (India) Sasikumar Mukund	7–6^{(7–3)}, 6–2
