= KPN Renewables Bangkok Open =

- 2016 KPN Renewables Bangkok Open

ATP Challenger Tour
- Location: Bangkok, Thailand
- Category: ATP Challenger Tour
- Surface: Hard / Outdoors
- Draw: 32S/32Q/16D
- Prize money: €50,000+H

The KPN Renewables Bangkok Open was a tennis tournament held in Bangkok, Thailand, in 2016. The event was part of the ATP Challenger Tour and was played on outdoor hardcourts.

== Past finals ==
=== Singles ===
Year	Champion	Runner-up	Score
2016	(Australia) James Duckworth	(Republic of Ireland) Sam Barry	7–6^{(7–5)}, 6–4

=== Doubles ===
Year	Champions	Runners-up	Score
2016	(Chinese Taipei) Chen Ti (Chinese Taipei) Jason Jung	(South Africa) Dean O'Brien (South Africa) Ruan Roelofse	6–4, 3–6, [10–8]
