= James Duckworth (tennis) =

Australian tennis player (born 1992)

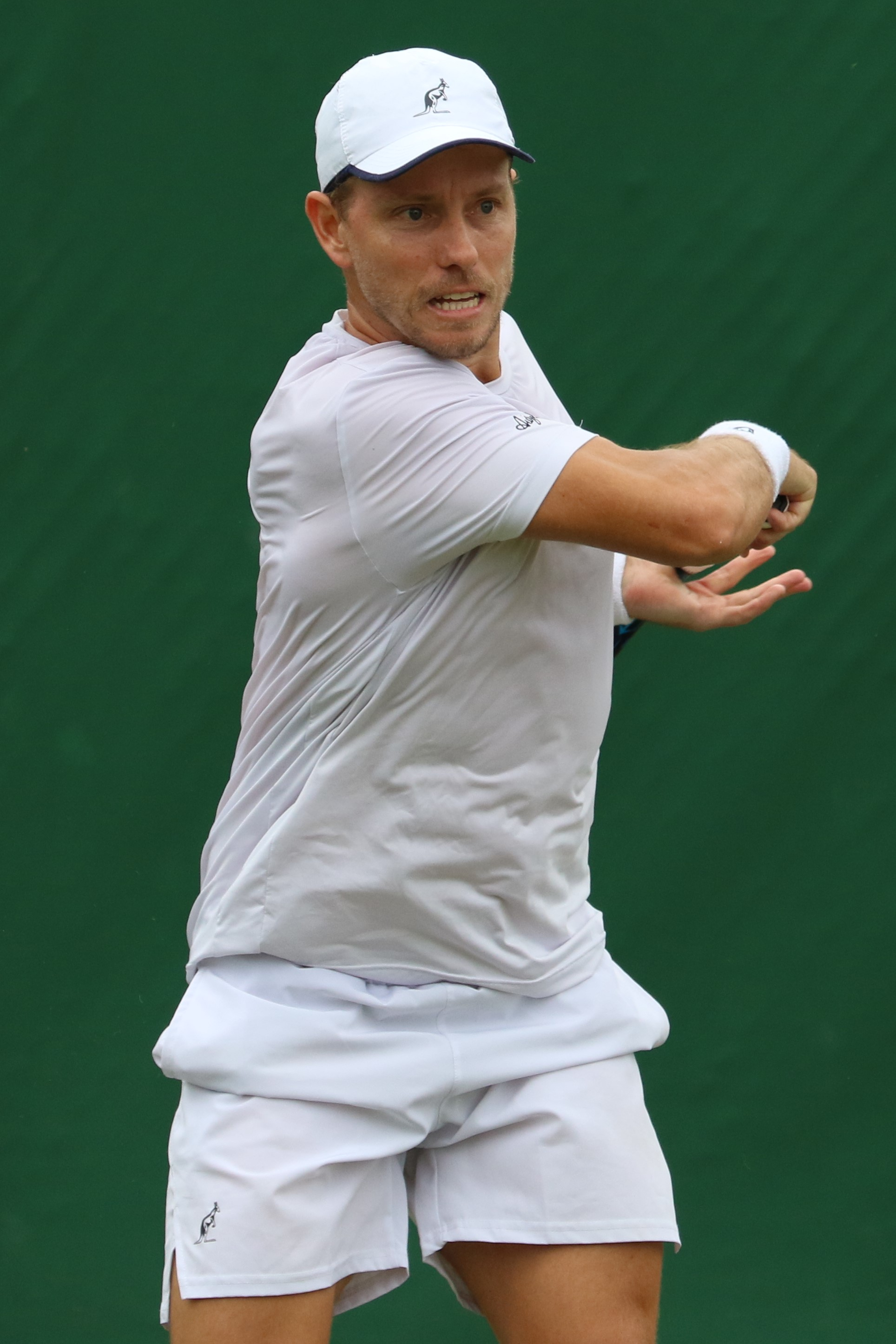
- Duckworth at the 2023 Wimbledon Championships
- Country (sports): Australia
- Residence: Sydney, New South Wales, Australia
- Born: 21 January 1992 (age 34) Sydney, New South Wales, Australia
- Height: 1.83 m (6 ft 0 in)
- Turned pro: 2010
- Plays: Right-handed (two-handed backhand)
- Coach: Paul Baccanello
- Prize money: US $6,613,726

Singles
- Career record: 85–139
- Career titles: 0
- Highest ranking: No. 46 (31 January 2022)
- Current ranking: No. 76 (9 November 2026)

Grand Slam singles results
- Australian Open: 2R (2012, 2013, 2015, 2021, 2025, 2026)
- French Open: 2R (2021, 2026)
- Wimbledon: 3R (2021)
- US Open: 2R (2016, 2022, 2026)

Other tournaments
- Olympic Games: 2R (2021)

Doubles
- Career record: 18–40
- Career titles: 0
- Highest ranking: No. 185 (10 February 2020)
- Current ranking: No. 887 (28 September 2026)

Grand Slam doubles results
- Australian Open: QF (2020)
- French Open: 2R (2025)
- Wimbledon: 1R (2022)
- US Open: 1R (2021, 2026)
- Last updated on: 28 September 2026.

James Duckworth (born 21 January 1992) is an Australian professional tennis player. He has a career-high ATP singles ranking of World No. 46 achieved on 31 January 2022 and No. 185 in doubles achieved on 10 February 2020. Duckworth represented Australia in tennis at the 2020 Tokyo Olympics and the 2022 ATP Cup.

As a junior, Duckworth enjoyed a successful career which included winning three titles and reaching the semifinals of the 2010 French Open.

== Personal life ==
Duckworth was born in Sydney. He attended Sydney Church of England Grammar School, where he was on the school tennis first team from Year 7 and went on to win several AAGPS Premierships. He was offered a scholarship to the Australian Institute of Sport, where he was able to further develop his tennis. Duckworth is a keen supporter of the Newcastle Knights in the National Rugby League.

== Junior career ==
Duckworth played his first ITF under-18 tournament in December 2005 as a 13-year-old, the event was held in Perth and Duckworth lost in the first round to Sebastian Bell. Duckworth's first big result came in December 2007 when he made his first final in Manila, Philippines but had to retire in the third set against Francis Casey Alcantara. Duckworth's first title came in August 2010 at the Oceania Closed Championship held in Fiji, he beat fellow Australian Maverick Banes in the final. Out of the nine junior tournaments Duckworth entered in 2010 he managed to reach three finals that resulted in two titles won in Kuching, Malaysia and Manila, Philippines respectively. Duckworth's best junior result came at 2010 Roland Garros Junior Championships where he reached the semi-finals. He reached as high as No. 7 in the combined world rankings in July 2010.

=== Junior singles titles (3) ===
Legend (singles)
Grand Slam (0)
Grade A (0)
Grade B (1)
Grade 1–5 (2)

| No. | Date | Tournament | Surface | Opponent | Score |
|---|---|---|---|---|---|
| 1. | 21 August 2010 | Lautoka | Hard | (Australia) Maverick Banes | 6–4, 6–4 |
| 2. | 21 March 2011 | Kuching | Hard | (Australia) Andrew Whittington | 6–4, 4–6, 6–4 |
| 3. | 28 March 2011 | Manila | Hard | (Sweden) Tobias Blomgren | 6–3, 6–2 |

== Professional career ==
=== 2006–2009 ===
Duckworth entered his first professional tournament in September 2006 as a 14-year-old in Happy Valley, South Australia where he was defeated in the first round of qualifying. He entered his second pro tournament in September 2007; the event was held in Sawtell, New South Wales, and Duckworth made it to the final round of qualifying, but fell at the last hurdle. In November 2008, Duckworth received a wildcard into a Futures tournament held in Perth and made the most of his opportunity; he recorded his first main draw victory in the first round. He followed up the victory with a surprise win over the fifth seed. In the quarterfinals, he fell to fourth seed and eventual champion Andrew Coelho. The following week, Duckworth received another wildcard into an event held in Sorrento, Western Australia, but could not keep the form going as he fell in the first round to James Lemke. Despite entering four Australian Futures toward the end of 2009, Duckworth only won one match and finished 2009 ranked no. 1712.

=== 2010: Turned Professional ===
The 2010 season began for Duckworth with a qualifying wildcard into his hometown ATP event in Sydney where he lost in the first round to fellow Australian Marinko Matosevic 1–6, 3–6. He also received a wildcard into the qualifying tournament of the 2010 Australian Open but fell in the first round to Somdev Devvarman 2–6, 1–6. While not competing in junior tournaments Duckworth played several futures tournaments held in Australia, Netherlands, USA and New Zealand. His best result came in November when he reached the semi-finals of a futures tournament held in New Zealand. Duckworth finished the year ranked 742 in the ATP rankings.

=== 2011: Top 300 debut ===
Duckworth began the year playing in the 2011 Brisbane International and the 2011 Australian Open qualifying tournaments after receiving wildcards into each event. Following the Australian summer series of tournaments Duckworth headed to Europe in hopes of boosting his ranking. Duckworth's choice of tournaments would prove successful with four titles and two runners-up in tournaments held across Poland and Italy.

His latest futures title was in Este Padova where he defeated Australian Jason Kubler en route to the final against Daniele Giorgini. These results enabled him to enter the top 300 on 29 August 2011 and he became one of Australia's top 10 players. Duckworth capped off the year by reaching the final of the 2012 Australian Open Men's Wildcard Playoff, falling to Marinko Matosevic 6–4, 6–1, 6–2.

=== 2012: ATP and Grand Slam debut ===
Following a successful 2011 season Duckworth was granted main draw wildcards into the Brisbane International, Apia International Sydney and the Australian Open. in January 2012, in the first round of his first ATP main-draw event at the 2012 Brisbane International Duckworth drew Frenchman Nicolas Mahut. After trailing 0–4 in the first set Duckworth came back and won his first ever ATP match 6–4, 6–4. In the second round of Brisbane Duckworth fell to world no. 12 Gilles Simon 3–6, 5–7 on Pat Rafter Arena. In the 2012 Apia International Sydney Duckworth fell to qualifier and eventual champion Jarkko Nieminen 2–6, 2–6.

On his Grand Slam debut at the 2012 Australian Open, Duckworth drew Estonian Jürgen Zopp in the first round and came out victorious in straight sets 6–3, 6–4, 6–4. In the second round Duckworth faced world number 9 Janko Tipsarević and got off to a quick start taking the first set. Duckworth would eventually lose in four sets 6–3, 2–6, 6–7, 4–6. Following the Australian Open Duckworth entered the Burnie Challenger where he was a first round casualty to Ben Mitchell 6–4, 3–6, 4–6. A week later Duckworth was seeded third in the Caloundra challenger and lived up to his seeding by reaching his first ever challenger semi-final. He was defeated by eventual champion Marinko Matosevic in the semi-finals 6–7, 3–6.

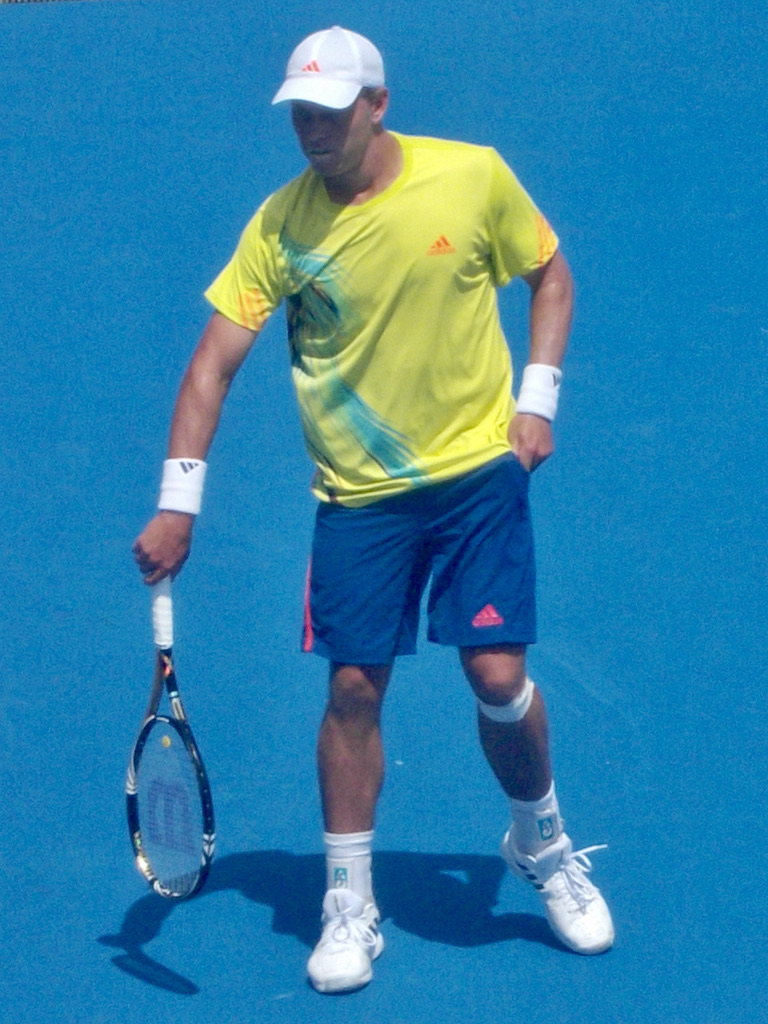
Duckworth at the 2013 Apia International in Sydney

=== 2013: Top 150 debut ===
Duckworth started his year at the 2013 Brisbane International where he lost in the second round of qualifying. He then played in the 2013 Apia International Sydney, where as a wildcard he almost made an upset against world No. 46 Denis Istomin 7–6^{(4)}, 4–6, 6–7^{(3)}. Duckworth then played in the 2013 Australian Open after receiving a wildcard. He defeated fellow Australian and good friend Ben Mitchell in the first round 6–4, 7–6^{(8)}, 4–6, 5–7, 8–6. He then played another long five set match in the second round, losing to world number 93 player Blaž Kavčič 6–3, 3–6, 4–6, 7–6^{(3)}, 8–10. After two first round losses against James Ward at the 2013 McDonald's Burnie International and the Charles Sturt Adelaide International, Duckworth reached the final of the Australia F1 Futures in Melbourne going down against Stéphane Robert 6–7^{(3)}, 3–6. Duckworth then competed in the 2013 Nature's Way Sydney Tennis International losing to compatriot Samuel Groth in the quarterfinals 6–7^{(2)}, 6–7^{(5)}.

Duckworth reached the second round at the 2013 All Japan Indoor Tennis Championships after defeating Jose Rubin Statham 6–4, 4–6, 6–3. He went down to second seed Marco Chiudinelli 6–7^{(5)}, 7–6^{(7)}, 2–6. Duckworth returned to Australia to compete in the Australia F5 tournament in Bundaberg. He reached the final and won it defeating Jason Kubler 7–6^{(9)}, 6–2. This was his fifth ITF title and his first in Australia.

After qualifying, Duckworth lost to Blaž Kavčič in the first round of the 2013 French Open. At Wimbledon, Duckworth progressed through qualifying again, but lost in the first round to fellow qualifier Denis Kudla in 5 sets. He made his top 150 debut on 12 August 2013. In October, Duckworth made the semi-finals of Melbourne Challenger, which improved his ranking to a career high of No. 132.

=== 2014: First and Second Challenger titles ===
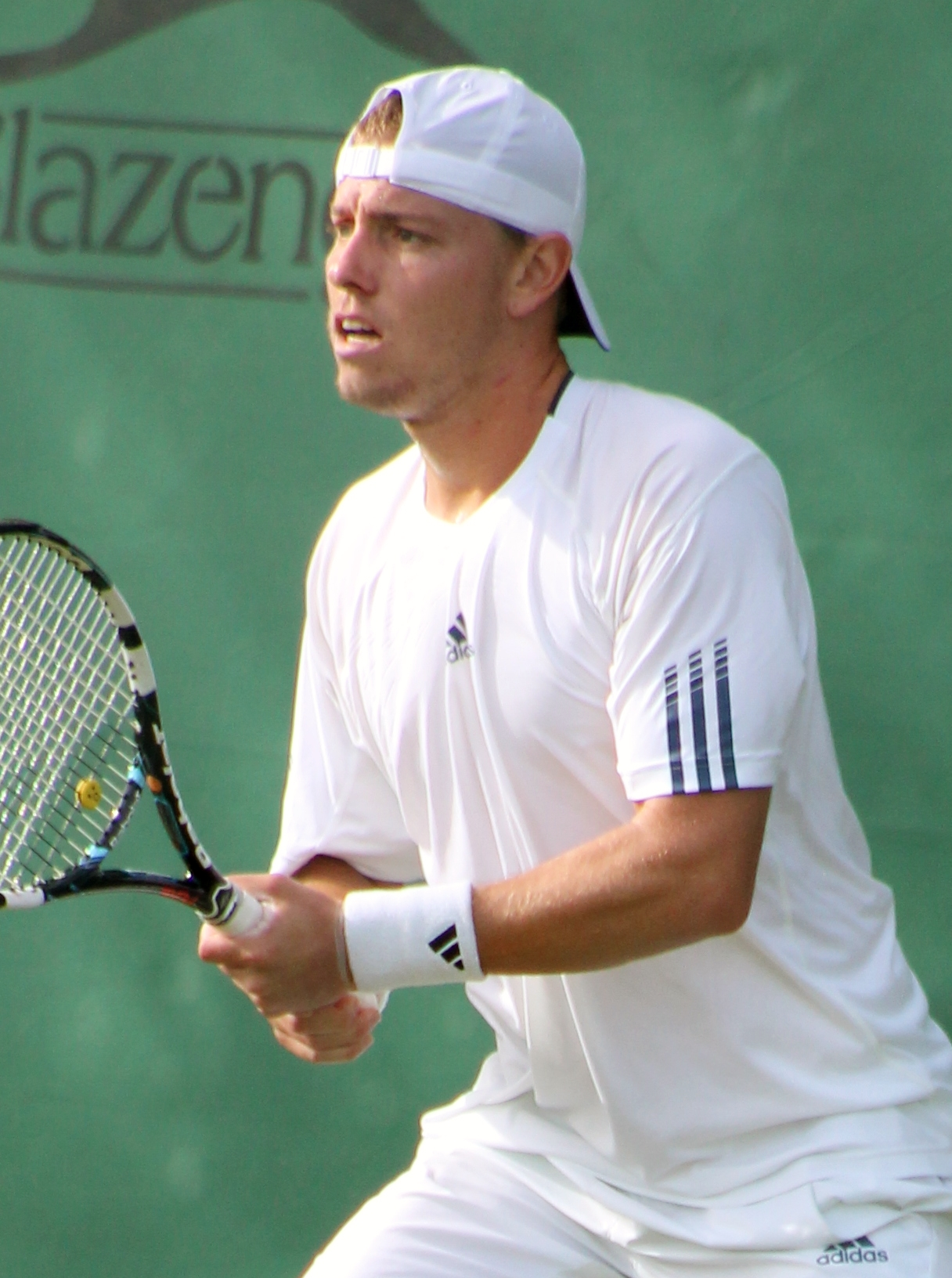
Duckworth at the 2014 Wimbledon qualifying tournament

Duckworth started his year at the 2014 Brisbane International after being awarded a wildcard. He was defeated in round 1 by Jarkko Nieminen

On 8 January, Duckworth was awarded a wild card into the 2014 Australian Open. His first round opponent was Roger Federer. He lost in straight sets.

In April, Duckworth reached the final of the Cachantún Cup. This was his second Challenger final, but lost to Thiemo de Bakker. Duckworth qualified for the 2014 French Open but lost in round one to Leonardo Mayer. In June, Duckworth qualified for the 2014 Aegon Championships and made round 2, where he lost in a close three-set match against the No. 2 seed, Tomáš Berdych, 4–6 in the third set. Duckworth qualified for 2014 Wimbledon Championships and in the first round led Richard Gasquet 2 sets to 1, before ultimately losing in five sets.

In July, Duckworth competed in the Lexington Challenger where he defeated countrymen Jordan Thompson in the second round and Thanasi Kokkinakis in the semifinal. He defeated Brit James Ward, 6–3, 6–4 in the final to win his first Challenger Title.

Duckworth was beaten in second round of qualifying at the US Open. In November, Duckworth made the final of the 2014 Charlottesville Challenger. He defeated Brit Liam Broady in the final on 2 November, this was his second career Challenger tour title. Duckworth finished 2014 with a career-high ranking of No.127.

=== 2015: Top 100 debut ===
As with the previous three years, Duckworth commenced his season at the 2015 Brisbane International after being awarded a wild card. In round 1, he caused an upset, defeating world no.21 Gilles Simon, 6–2, 6–2. He then defeated Jarkko Nieminen reaching the quarter-finals in an ATP Tour event for the first time in his career. But then he lost to Roger Federer in straight sets 0–6, 1–6. Duckworth was given a wild card into the 2015 Australian Open, where he defeated Blaž Kavčič in round 1 but lost to the 24th seed Richard Gasquet in the second round. In February, Duckworth was the no.1 seed at the Delhi Challenger and Kolkata Challenger. He lost in round 2 at Delhi and lost in the final of Kolkata to Radu Albot. At Indian Wells, Duckworth qualified and defeated Dominic Thiem in round 1 before losing to Fernando Verdasco, as a result of his performance, he secured a top 100 ATP ranking for the first time in his career on 23 March 2015. Duckworth then qualified for the 2015 Miami Open and reached the second round where he again lost to Verdasco. He then returned to the challenger tour playing in San Luis, Anning and Bordeaux where he lost in the semi-finals, quarter-finals and second round respectively. Duckworth then played in the Tour 250 event in Nice where he defeated lucky losers Frances Tiafoe and Quentin Halys to reach his second ATP tour quarterfinal of 2015 and his career. He then lost to Borna Ćorić in straight sets. At Wimbledon, Duckworth came back from 2 sets to 0 down again Malek Jaziri to win in five sets, posting his first win at Wimbledon. He lost to compatriot Sam Groth in round 2. At the US Open, Duckworth lost in round 1 to Hyeon Chung in straight sets. He played a number of challenger events to finish the season making the quarter finals in Ho Chi Minh, Ningbo and Knoxville. Duckworth ended the year with a ranking of World No. 120.

=== 2016: First ATP doubles final, Elbow injury and ranking drop ===
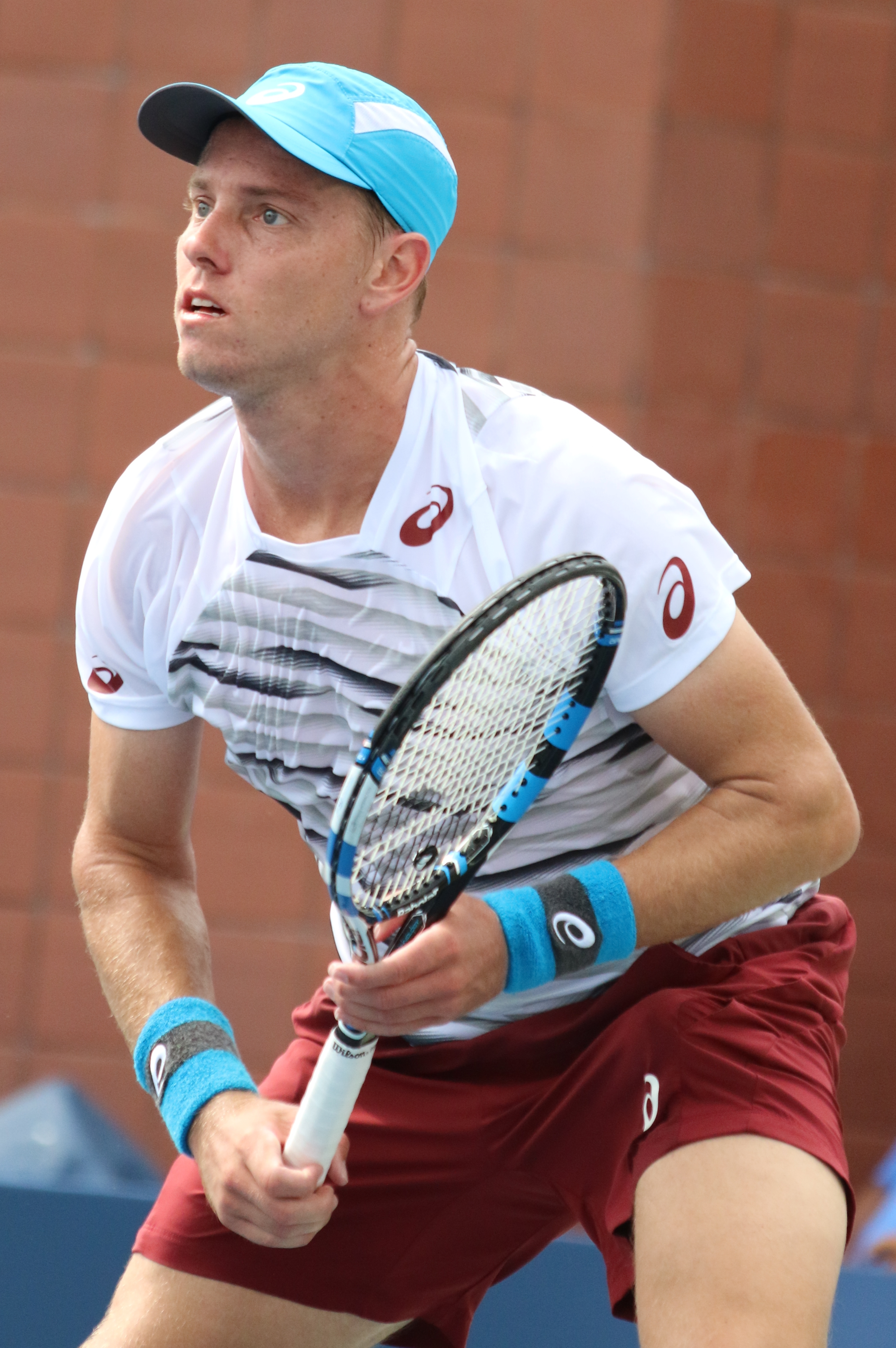
Duckworth at the 2016 US Open

Duckworth again commenced the year at the 2016 Brisbane International, but lost in the first round to Dominic Thiem. He played doubles with Chris Guccione where they made the final losing to Henri Kontinen and John Peers. Duckworth was awarded a wild card into Sydney, where he defeated Íñigo Cervantes and lost to Jérémy Chardy in round 2. At the 2016 Australian Open, Duckwork lost to Lleyton Hewitt in the first round as a wildcard. Duckworth tore a flexor tendon in his right elbow after the Australian Open, he then broke his left wrist doing sprints and sidelined Duckworth for four months. His ranking dropped to outside the top 200.

He returned to play in May and won the China F6 in Wuhan and Bangkok Challenger. Duckworth's grass season was unsuccessful, winning just one match in qualifying. In July, Duckworth qualified for the main draw at the 2016 Citi Open, losing in the second round to the top seed, John Isner. Duckworth lost in the final round of qualifying for Rogers Cup and again in Atlanta Open, both in final set tie-breaks. At the US Open, Duckworth was awarded a wildcard. He defeated Robin Haase in the first round. In November, Duckworth won his second and third Challenger titles of the year, defeating compatriot and maiden finalist Marc Polmans in Canberra and Tatsuma Ito in Japan. Duckworth ended the year with a ranking of World No. 103.

=== 2017: Foot surgery ===
Duckworth commenced the season at the 2017 Australian Open where he received direct entry for the first time in his career. He lost to Paolo Lorenzi in round 1. Shortly after the loss, Duckworth underwent a foot surgery. Duckworth didn't play again in 2017, ending the year with a ranking of 992.

=== 2018: Return ===
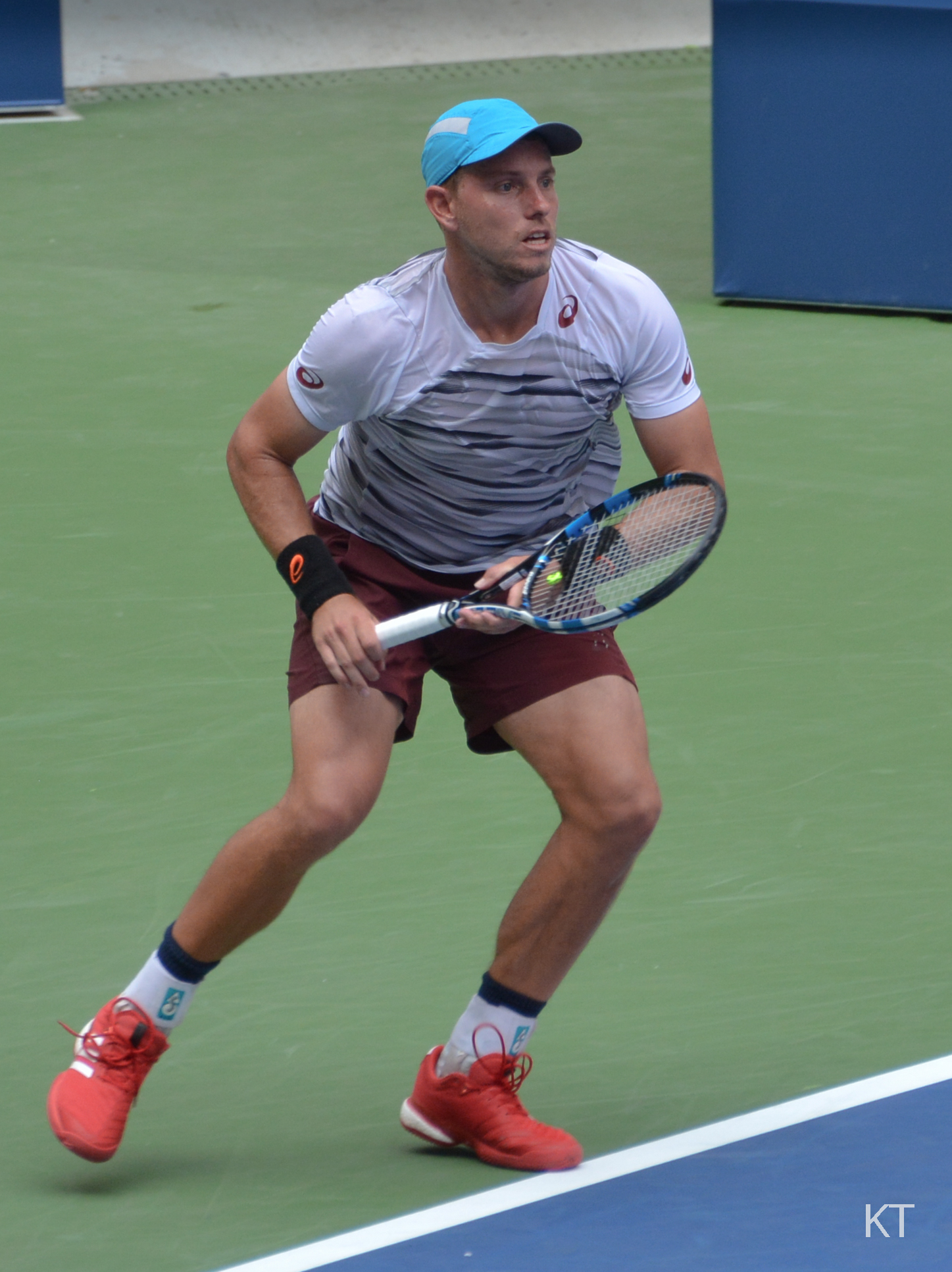
Duckworth at the 2018 US Open

In January, Duckworth attempted to play the Brisbane International and Australian Open, falling in qualifying in both. Duckworth next played the French Open losing to Marin Čilić in round 1. In June, Duckworth reached and retired in the final of the ITF Turkey F22.

Duckworth lost to Alexander Zverev in the first round of Wimbledon. In July Duckworth won his first match on the ATP World Tour in over 18 months at the 2018 Citi Open. Duckworth lost to Andy Murray in the first round of the US Open. Immediately after the US Open, Duckworth qualified for and won the Cary Challenger. This was his first title in 2 years. Duckworth ended 2018 with an ATP singles rank of 234.

=== 2019: Four Challenger titles, Sixth Australian Open wildcard, Return to Top 100 ===
In January, Duckworth lost in the first round of the Brisbane International, Sydney International and Australian Open after getting a sixth wildcard, before returning to the Asian challenger tour, winning the 2019 Bangkok Challenger II.

In May, Duckworth lost in the first round of qualifying for the 2019 French Open and in June, the second round of qualifying at Wimbledon. In July, Duckworth returned to the challenger tour in Asian challenger tour reaching the final of the Yokkaichi Challenger and winning Baotou. At year-end he returned to the top 100 on 18 November 2019.

=== 2020: First ATP semifinal, Australian Open doubles quarterfinal, out of top 100 ===
In February 2020, Duckworth reached his first ATP Tour semi-final in Pune, India, losing to Egor Gerasimov in straight sets. Also in February, Duckworth won the 2020 Bengaluru Challenger; his eleventh singles Challenger title. As a result, he reached a career-high ranking of No. 71 on 17 February 2020.

Following the tennis shutdown, due to the Covid pandemic, Duckworth lost in the first round of the US Open and French Open. Duckworth ended 2020 with an ATP singles rank of No. 103.

=== 2021: Olympics debut, first ATP final, Masters quarterfinal & top 50 ===
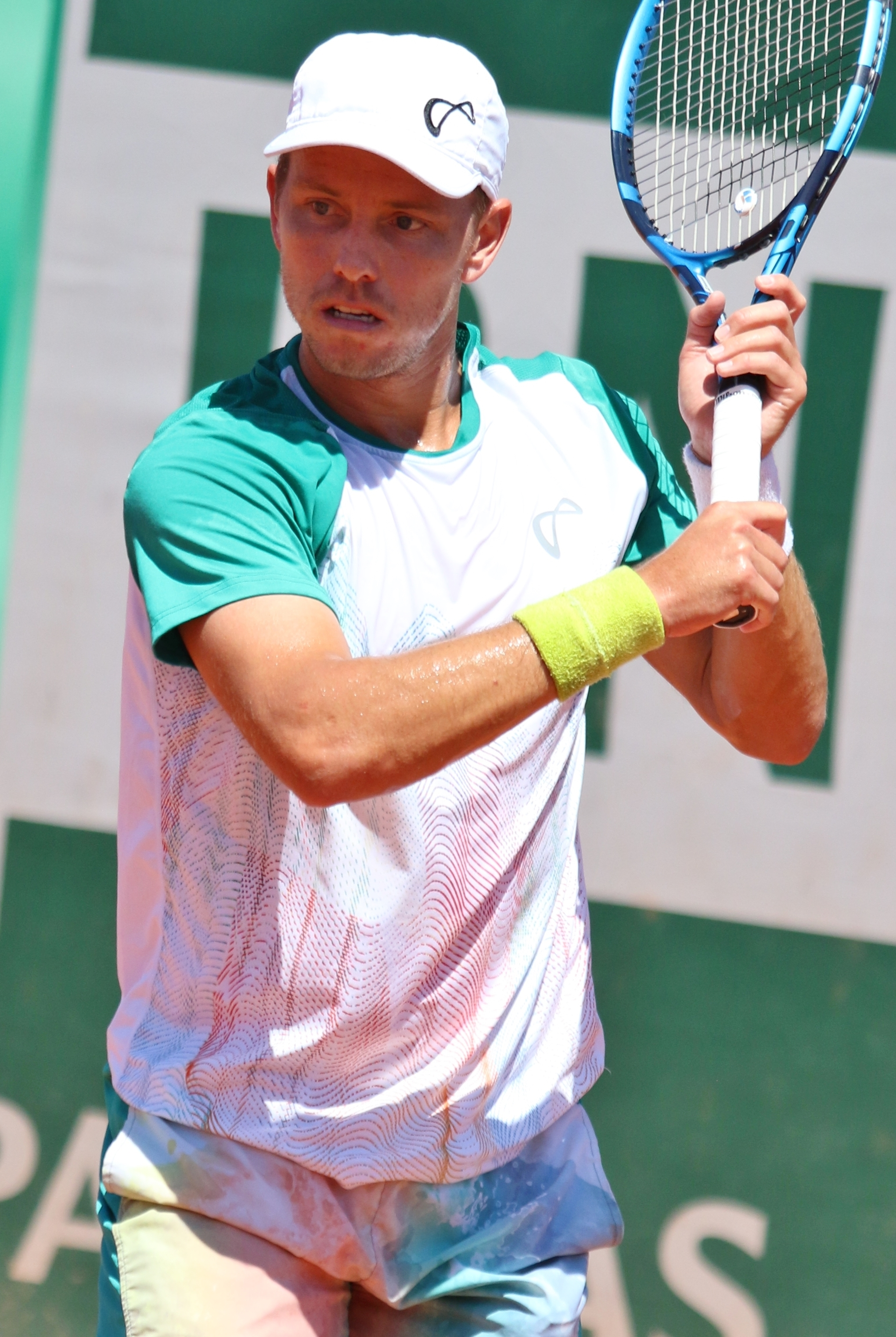
Duckworth at the 2021 French Open

Duckworth commenced the 2021 season at the 2021 Murray River Open where he defeated Ugo Humbert his first win over a top-50 opponent in more than four years. He also reached the second round at the 2021 Australian Open for a fourth time defeating lucky loser Damir Džumhur. In March, at the 2021 Miami Open he reached the third round of a Masters 1000 for the first time in his career defeating 8th seed David Goffin for his first top-20 win. In May, at the 2021 French Open, he reached the second round for the first time in his career in six attempts defeating Salvatore Caruso.

In June, Duckworth scored his first top-50 win on grass, against Adrian Mannarino at the Stuttgart Open. At the 2021 Wimbledon Championships Duckworth reached the third round of a Grand Slam for the first time in his career defeating Sam Querrey, which came in his 25th Grand Slam main draw.

In July, Duckworth represented Australia at the 2020 Summer Olympics, where he recorded his first win against Lukáš Klein. He was defeated by 12th seed Karen Khachanov in the second round. In August, Duckworth qualified for the Canada Open and defeated world number 15 Jannik Sinner to reach the third round. It was the second top-20 win of Duckworth's career. As a result, he entered the top 70. In September, Duckworth won the 2021 Amex-Istanbul Challenger II and achieved a career high singles ranking of World No. 65 on 20 September 2021.

Duckworth also reached his first ATP final at the Astana Open after beating Mikhail Kukushkin, 4th seed Filip Krajinović, 5th seed and defending champion John Millman and 8th seed Ilya Ivashka. He lost to Kwon Soon-woo in straight sets after holding 3 set points, leading 6–3 in the first set tie-break. As a result, he reached a career-high of World No. 56 on 27 September 2021. At the 2021 Rolex Paris Masters he reached the quarterfinals of a Masters 1000 for the first time having never passed beyond the third round at this level. He defeated 14th seed Roberto Bautista Agut, his third top-20 win for the season and in his career, Lorenzo Musetti and fellow Australian Alexei Popyrin en route. As a result, he reached the top 50 in the singles rankings at World No. 47 on 8 November for the first time in his career. Duckworth ended 2021 with a ranking of No. 49.

=== 2022–2023: ATP Cup debut, Out of top 100, historic 13th Challenger title ===
Although he reached the quarterfinals at the 2022 San Diego Open defeating compatriot Alexei Popyrin and Mitchell Krueger, he fell out of the top 100 on 26 September 2022 to No. 109.

He qualified for his first Masters of 2023 in Shanghai. He won his 13th title at the new 2023 Shenzhen Luohu Challenger making him the Australian singles player with the most titles in ATP Challenger Tour history.

=== 2024–2025: Australian Open wildcard, record Challenger titles ===
Following his good results in the 2023 season, he received a wildcard for his home Slam, the 2024 Australian Open. He reached the quarterfinals of his home warm-up AO tournament at the 2024 Brisbane International as a qualifier and returned to the top 100 on 8 January 2024.

Ranked No. 78, he entered the main draw of the 2024 Wimbledon Championships as a lucky loser.

Following lifting the Challenger trophy at the 2025 Sydney Challenger, Duckworth tied the record for the most titles among active players with Facundo Bagnis at 17.

== Performance timeline ==
Key
| W | F | SF | QF | #R | RR | Q# | P# | DNQ | A | Z# | PO | G | S | B | NMS | NTI | P | NH |

(W) winner; (F) finalist; (SF) semifinalist; (QF) quarterfinalist; (#R) rounds 4, 3, 2, 1; (RR) round-robin stage; (Q#) qualification round; (P#) preliminary round; (DNQ) did not qualify; (A) absent; (Z#) Davis/Fed Cup Zonal Group (with number indication) or (PO) play-off; (G) gold, (S) silver or (B) bronze Olympic/Paralympic medal; (NMS) not a Masters tournament; (NTI) not a Tier I tournament; (P) postponed; (NH) not held; (SR) strike rate (events won / competed); (W–L) win–loss record.
To avoid confusion and double counting, these charts are updated at the conclusion of a tournament or when the player's participation has ended.

=== Singles ===
| Tournament | 2010 | 2011 | 2012 | 2013 | 2014 | 2015 | 2016 | 2017 | 2018 | 2019 | 2020 | 2021 | 2022 | 2023 | 2024 | 2025 | 2026 | SR | W–L | Win % |
|---|---|---|---|---|---|---|---|---|---|---|---|---|---|---|---|---|---|---|---|---|
Grand Slam tournaments
| Australian Open | Q1 | Q1 | 2R | 2R | 1R | 2R | 1R | 1R | Q2 | 1R | 1R | 2R | 1R | Q1 | 1R | 2R | 2R | 0 / 13 | 6-13 | 32% |
| French Open | A | A | Q1 | 1R | 1R | 1R | A | A | 1R | Q1 | 1R | 2R | 1R | Q1 | Q1 | 1R | 2R | 0 / 9 | 2–9 | 18% |
| Wimbledon | A | A | Q2 | 1R | 1R | 2R | Q1 | A | 1R | Q2 | NH | 3R | 1R | Q2 | 1R | 1R | 2R | 0 / 9 | 4-9 | 31% |
| US Open | A | A | Q2 | 1R | Q2 | 1R | 2R | A | 1R | Q1 | 1R | 1R | 2R | 1R | 1R | 1R | 2R | 0 / 11 | 3–11 | 21% |
| Win–loss | 0–0 | 0–0 | 1–1 | 1–4 | 0–3 | 2–4 | 1–2 | 0–1 | 0–3 | 0–1 | 0–3 | 4–4 | 1–4 | 0–1 | 0–3 | 1–4 | 4-4 | 0 / 42 | 15–42 | 26% |
ATP Masters 1000
| Indian Wells Masters | A | A | A | A | A | 2R | A | A | A | A | NH | 1R | A | A | A | Q2 | 1R | 0 / 3 | 1–3 | 25% |
| Miami Open | A | A | A | A | A | 2R | A | A | A | A | NH | 3R | A | Q1 | A | Q2 | 1R | 0 / 3 | 3–3 | 50% |
| Monte-Carlo Masters | A | A | A | A | A | A | A | A | A | A | NH | A | A | A | A | A | A | 0 / 0 | 0–0 | – |
| Madrid Open | A | A | A | A | A | A | A | A | A | A | NH | A | A | A | A | A | A | 0 / 0 | 0–0 | – |
| Italian Open | A | A | A | A | A | A | A | A | A | A | Q2 | A | A | A | A | A | A | 0 / 0 | 0–0 | – |
| Canadian Open | A | A | A | A | Q2 | Q2 | Q2 | A | A | A | NH | 3R | Q1 | Q1 | 2R | 2R | 2R | 0 / 4 | 5–4 | 56% |
| Cincinnati Masters | A | A | A | A | A | Q1 | A | A | A | A | A | A | A | A | A | Q1 | 2R | 0 / 1 | 1–1 | 50% |
| Shanghai Masters | A | A | A | Q2 | Q2 | A | A | A | A | A | NH | | | 1R | 1R | Q1 | 1R | 0 / 3 | 0–3 | 0% |
| Paris Masters | A | A | A | A | A | A | A | A | A | A | A | QF | A | A | A | A | Q1 | 0 / 1 | 3–1 | 75% |
| Win–loss | 0–0 | 0–0 | 0–0 | 0–0 | 0–0 | 2–2 | 0–0 | 0–0 | 0–0 | 0–0 | 0–0 | 7–4 | 0–0 | 0–1 | 1–2 | 1–1 | 2–5 | 0 / 15 | 13–15 | 46% |
National representation
| Davis Cup | A | A | A | A | A | A | A | A | A | A | RR | | A | A | A | A | | | | 0–0 |
| Summer Olympics | NH | | A | NH | | | A | NH | | | | 2R | NH | | A | NH | | | | 1–1 |
| ATP Cup | Not Held | | | | | | | | | | A | A | RR | Not Held | | | | | | 0–2 |
| Year-end ranking | 742 | 275 | 209 | 136 | 127 | 120 | 103 | 990 | 234 | 100 | 103 | 49 | 172 | 116 | 82 | 87 | | | | |

=== Doubles ===
| Tournament | 2011 | 2012 | 2013 | 2014 | 2015 | 2016 | 2017 | 2018 | 2019 | 2020 | 2021 | 2022 | 2023 | 2024 | 2025 | 2026 | W–L |
|---|---|---|---|---|---|---|---|---|---|---|---|---|---|---|---|---|---|
Grand Slam tournaments
| Australian Open | 1R | 1R | 1R | 1R | 1R | 1R | A | A | 1R | QF | 3R | 1R | A | 1R | 2R | 1R | 6–13 |
| French Open | A | A | A | A | 1R | A | A | A | A | 1R | A | 1R | A | A | 2R | 1R | 1–5 |
| Wimbledon | A | A | A | A | A | A | A | A | A | NH | A | 1R | A | A | A | A | 0–1 |
| US Open | A | A | A | A | A | A | A | A | A | A | 1R | A | A | A | A | 1R | 0–2 |
| Win–loss | 0–1 | 0–1 | 0–1 | 0–1 | 0–2 | 0–1 | 0–0 | 0–0 | 0–1 | 3–2 | 2–2 | 0–3 | 0–0 | 0–1 | 2–2 | 0–3 | 7–21 |

== ATP Tour career finals ==
=== Singles: 1 (1 runner-up) ===
| Legend (singles) Grand Slam tournaments (0–0) ATP Finals (0–0) ATP Tour Masters 1000 (0–0) ATP Tour 500 Series (0–0) ATP Tour 250 Series (0–1) | Finals by surface Hard (0–1) Clay (0–0) Grass (0–0) | Finals by setting Outdoor (0–0) Indoor (0–1) |

| Result | Date | Tournament | Tier | Surface | Opponent | Score |
|---|---|---|---|---|---|---|
| Loss | Sep 2021 | Astana Open, Kazakhstan | 250 Series | Hard (i) | (South Korea) Kwon Soon-woo | 6–7^{(6–8)}, 3–6 |

=== Doubles: 1 (1 runner-up) ===
| Legend (doubles) Grand Slam tournaments (0–0) ATP Finals (0–0) ATP Tour Masters 1000 (0–0) ATP Tour 500 Series (0–0) ATP Tour 250 Series (0–1) | Finals by surface Hard (0–1) Clay (0–0) Grass (0–0) | Finals by setting Outdoor (0–1) Indoor (0–0) |

| Result | Date | Tournament | Tier | Surface | Partner | Opponents | Score |
|---|---|---|---|---|---|---|---|
| Loss | Jan 2016 | Brisbane International, Australia | 250 Series | Hard | (Australia) Chris Guccione | (Finland) Henri Kontinen (Australia) John Peers | 6–7^{(4–7)}, 1–6 |

== ATP Challenger and ITF Tour finals ==
=== Singles: 43 (25 titles, 18 runner-ups) ===
| Legend (singles) ATP Challenger Tour (18–14) Futures/ITF World Tennis Tour (7–4) | Finals by surface Hard (15–13) Clay (9–5) Grass (0–0) Carpet (1–0) |

| Result | W–L | Date | Tournament | Tier | Surface | Opponent | Score |
|---|---|---|---|---|---|---|---|
| Win | 1–0 | May 2011 | Poland F1, Kraków | Futures | Clay | (Poland) Grzegorz Panfil | 6–3, 6–4 |
| Loss | 1–1 | May 2011 | Poland F2, Katowice | Futures | Clay | (Poland) Marcin Gawron | 4–6, 2–6 |
| Win | 2–1 | Jun 2011 | Poland F4, Bytom | Futures | Clay | (Germany) Peter Torebko | 6–3, 3–6, 6–4 |
| Loss | 2–2 | Jul 2011 | Italy F16, Bologna | Futures | Clay | (Italy) Daniele Giorgini | 6–7^{(4–7)}, 6–7^{(3–7)} |
| Win | 3–2 | Jul 2011 | Italy F17, Sassuolo | Futures | Clay | (Italy) Thomas Fabbiano | 6–1, 6–2 |
| Win | 4–2 | Aug 2011 | Italy F23, Este | Futures | Clay | (Italy) Daniele Giorgini | 6–2, 6–3 |
| Loss | 4–3 | Feb 2013 | Australia F1, Melbourne | Futures | Hard | (France) Stéphane Robert | 6–7^{(3–7)}, 3–6 |
| Win | 5–3 | Mar 2013 | Australia F5, Bundaberg | Futures | Clay | (Australia) Jason Kubler | 7–6^{(11–9)}, 6–2 |
| Win | 6–3 | May 2013 | Chile F3, Santiago | Futures | Clay | (Chile) Cristian Garín | 6–1, 6–3 |
| Loss | 6–4 | Jul 2013 | Lexington, USA | Challenger | Hard | (United Kingdom) James Ward | 6–4, 3–6, 4–6 |
| Loss | 6–5 | Apr 2014 | Santiago, Chile | Challenger | Clay | (Netherlands) Thiemo de Bakker | 6–4, 6–7^{(10–12)}, 1–6 |
| Win | 7–5 | Jul 2014 | Lexington, USA | Challenger | Hard | (United Kingdom) James Ward | 6–3, 6–4 |
| Win | 8–5 | Nov 2014 | Charlottesville, USA | Challenger | Hard (i) | (United Kingdom) Liam Broady | 5–7, 6–3, 6–2 |
| Loss | 8–6 | Feb 2015 | Kolkata, India | Challenger | Hard | (Moldova) Radu Albot | 6–7^{(0–7)}, 1–6 |
| Win | 9–6 | May 2016 | China F6, Wuhan | Futures | Hard | (Japan) Yusuke Takahashi | 6–3, 6–2 |
| Win | 10–6 | May 2016 | Bangkok, Thailand | Challenger | Hard | (Republic of Ireland) Sam Barry | 7–6^{(7–5)}, 6–4 |
| Win | 11–6 | Nov 2016 | Canberra, Australia | Challenger | Hard | (Australia) Marc Polmans | 7–5, 6–3 |
| Loss | 11–7 | Nov 2016 | Kobe, Japan | Challenger | Hard (i) | (South Korea) Chung Hyeon | 4–6, 6–7^{(2–7)} |
| Win | 12–7 | Nov 2016 | Toyota, Japan | Challenger | Carpet (i) | (Japan) Tatsuma Ito | 7–5, 4–6, 6–1 |
| Loss | 12–8 | Jun 2018 | Turkey F22, Antalya | Futures | Clay | (Austria) Thomas Statzberger | 3–6, 0–1 ret. |
| Win | 13–8 | Sep 2018 | Cary, USA | Challenger | Hard | (United States) Reilly Opelka | 7–6^{(7–4)}, 6–3 |
| Win | 14–8 | Feb 2019 | Bangkok, Thailand | Challenger | Hard | (Spain) Alejandro Davidovich Fokina | 6–4, 6–3 |
| Loss | 14–9 | Aug 2019 | Yokkaichi, Japan | Challenger | Hard | (Japan) Yūichi Sugita | 6–3, 3–6, 6–7^{(1–7)} |
| Win | 15–9 | Aug 2019 | Baotou, China | Challenger | Clay (i) | (India) Sasikumar Mukund | 6–4, 6–3 |
| Loss | 15–10 | Oct 2019 | Las Vegas, USA | Challenger | Hard | (Canada) Vasek Pospisil | 5–7, 7–6^{(13–11)}, 3–6 |
| Win | 16–10 | Nov 2019 | Playford, Australia | Challenger | Hard | (Japan) Yasutaka Uchiyama | 7–6^{(7–2)}, 6–4 |
| Win | 17–10 | Nov 2019 | Pune, India | Challenger | Hard | (United Kingdom) Jay Clarke | 4–6, 6–4, 6–4 |
| Win | 18–10 | Feb 2020 | Bangalore, India | Challenger | Hard | (France) Benjamin Bonzi | 6–4, 6–4 |
| Win | 19–10 | Sep 2021 | Istanbul, Turkey | Challenger | Hard | (Chinese Taipei) Wu Tung-lin | 6–4, 6–2 |
| Loss | 19–11 | Sep 2022 | Cassis, France | Challenger | Hard | (France) Hugo Grenier | 5–7, 4–6 |
| Loss | 19–12 | Feb 2023 | Burnie, Australia | Challenger | Hard | (Australia) Rinky Hijikata | 3–6, 3–6 |
| Loss | 19–13 | Feb 2023 | Bangalore, India | Challenger | Hard | (Australia) Max Purcell | 6–3, 5–7, 6–7^{(5–7)} |
| Loss | 19–14 | Apr 2023 | Cuernavaca, Mexico | Challenger | Hard | (Argentina) Thiago Agustín Tirante | 5–7, 0–6 |
| Win | 20–14 | Oct 2023 | Shenzhen, China | Challenger | Hard | (Hong Kong) Coleman Wong | 6–0, 6–1 |
| Win | 21–14 | Oct 2023 | Playford, Australia | Challenger | Hard | (Hong Kong) Coleman Wong | 7–5, 7–5 |
| Loss | 21–15 | Nov 2023 | Drummondville, Canada | Challenger | Hard (i) | (Belgium) Zizou Bergs | 4–6, 5–7 |
| Loss | 21–16 | Apr 2024 | Shenzhen, China | Challenger | Hard | (South Africa) Lloyd Harris | 3–6, 3–6 |
| Win | 22–16 | Oct 2024 | Hangzhou, China | Challenger | Hard | (United States) Mackenzie McDonald | 2–6, 7–6^{(7–5)}, 6–4 |
| Loss | 22–17 | Mar 2025 | Morelia, Mexico | Challenger | Hard | (Kazakhstan) Dmitry Popko | 6-1, 2–6, 4–6 |
| Win | 23–17 | Apr 2025 | San Luis Potosi, Mexico | Challenger | Clay | (Germany) Max Wiskandt | 6–1, 6–1 |
| Win | 24–17 | Nov 2025 | Sydney, Australia | Challenger | Hard | (Japan) Hayato Matsuoka | 6–1, 6–4 |
| Loss | 24–18 | Mar 2026 | San Luis Potosí, Mexico | Challenger | Clay | (Colombia) Nicolás Mejía | 6–7^{(6–8)}, 2–6 |
| Win | 25–18 | Apr 2026 | Mexico City, Mexico | Challenger | Clay | (Italy) Stefano Napolitano | 6–7^{(7–9)}, 7–6^{(7–3)}, 6–2. |

=== Doubles: 3 (1 title, 2 runner-ups) ===
| Legend (doubles) ATP Challenger Tour (1–2) Futures/ITF World Tennis Tour (0–0) | Finals by surface Hard (0–2) Clay (1–0) Grass (0–0) Carpet (0–0) |

| Result | W–L | Date | Tournament | Tier | Surface | Partner | Opponents | Score |
|---|---|---|---|---|---|---|---|---|
| Loss | 0–1 | Feb 2013 | West Lakes, Australia | Challenger | Hard | (Australia) Greg Jones | (Australia) Sam Groth (Australia) Matt Reid | 2–6, 4–6 |
| Win | 1–1 | Apr 2013 | Itajaí, Brazil | Challenger | Clay | (France) Pierre-Hugues Herbert | (Brazil) Guilherme Clezar (Brazil) Fabrício Neis | 7–5, 6–2 |
| Loss | 1–2 | Feb 2015 | Kolkata, India | Challenger | Hard | (Australia) Luke Saville | (India) Jeevan Nedunchezhiyan (India) Somdev Devvarman | walkover |
