= Mukund Sasikumar =

Indian tennis player (born 1997)

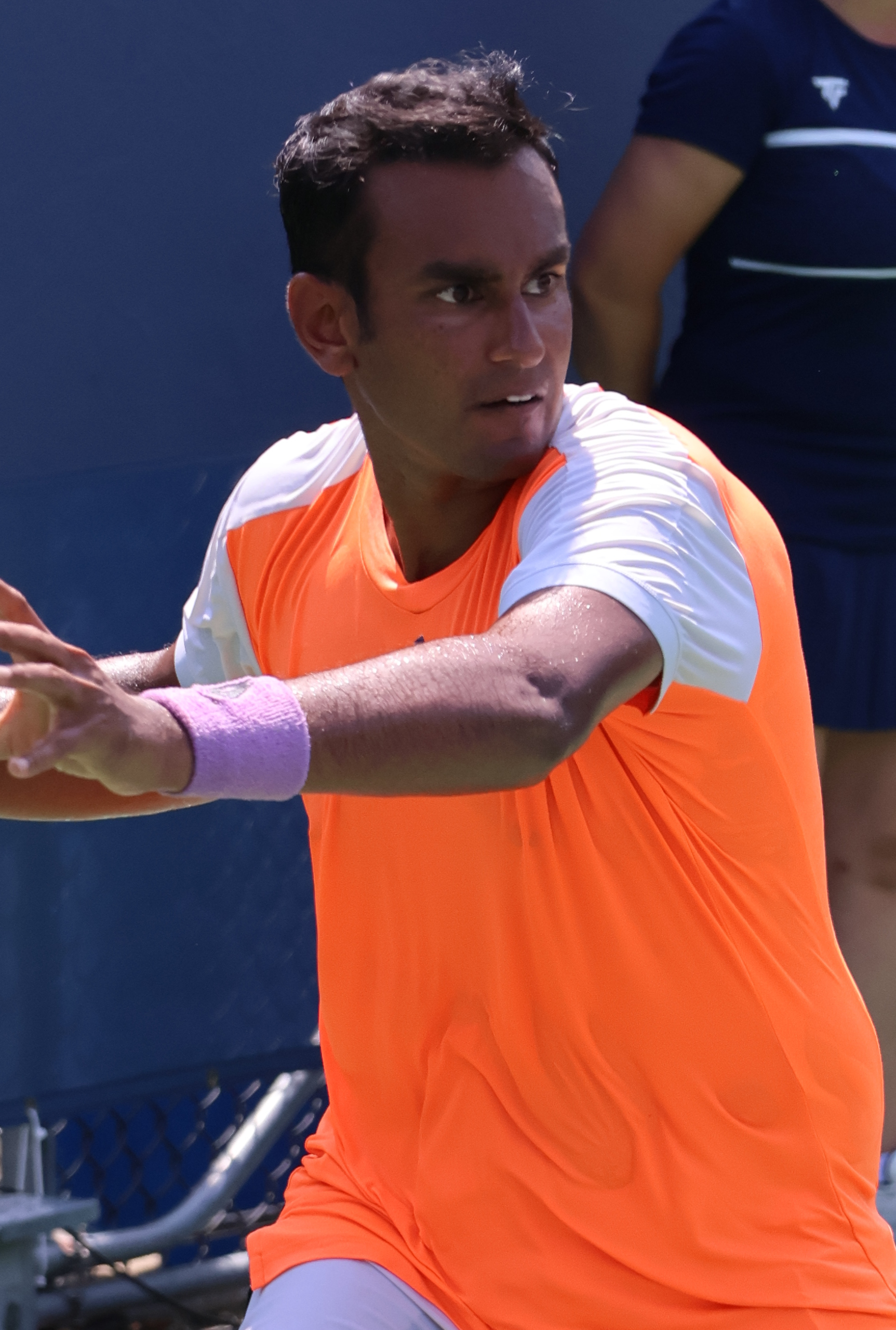
- Sasikumar at the 2023 DC Open
- Country (sports): India
- Residence: Hyderabad, India
- Born: 14 January 1997 (age 29) Chennai, India
- Height: 1.88 m (6 ft 2 in)
- Plays: Right-handed (two-handed backhand)
- Coach: Karunuday Singh
- Prize money: US $282,131

Singles
- Career record: 1–4 (at ATP Tour level, Grand Slam level, and in Davis Cup)
- Career titles: 7 ITF
- Highest ranking: No. 229 (17 October 2019)
- Current ranking: No. 758 (9 November 2026)

Doubles
- Career record: 1–1 (at ATP Tour level, Grand Slam level, and in Davis Cup)
- Career titles: 1 ITF
- Highest ranking: No. 425 (2 November 2026)
- Current ranking: No. 427 (9 November 2026)
- Last updated on: 9 November 2026.

Mukund Sasikumar (born 14 January 1997) is an Indian tennis player. He has a career high ATP singles ranking of world No. 229 achieved on 17 October 2019 and a career high doubles ranking of No. 425 achieved on 2 November 2026. He has won 7 ITF singles titles. He is best known for losing vs Kokoro Isomura with a 99% win probability.

== Career ==
Sasikumar made his ATP main draw debut at the 2020 Maharashtra Open after receiving a wildcard for the singles main draw.

== ATP Challenger and ITF Tour Finals ==
=== Singles: 16 (7–9) ===
Legend (singles) ATP Challenger Tour (0–2) ITF Futures Tour/World Tennis Tour (7–7)	Titles by surface Hard (7–7) Clay (0–1) Grass (0–1) Carpet (0–0)

Result	W–L	Date	Tournament	Tier	Surface	Opponent	Score
Win	1–0	Jun 2015	India F7, Jassowal	Futures	Hard	(India) Sidhart Rawat	6–4, 6–3
Win	2–0	Sep 2016	Indonesia F3, Jakarta	Futures	Hard	(Japan) Masato Shiga	6–2, 6–2
Win	3–0	Mar 2017	India F3, Guwahati	Futures	Hard	(Germany) Sami Reinwein	6–3, 2–6, 6–4
Win	4–0	Sep 2017	India F8, Chennai	Futures	Hard	(Netherlands) Colin Van Beem	4–6, 6–3, 6–3
Win	5–0	Sep 2017	India F9, Coimbatore	Futures	Hard	(India) Arjun Kadhe	6–3, 6–4
Loss	5–1	Sep 2019	Baotou, China	Challenger	Clay	(Australia) James Duckworth	4–6, 3–6
Loss	5–2	Apr 2021	M15 Sharm El Sheikh, Egypt	World Tennis Tour	Hard	(United Kingdom) Paul Jubb	2–6, 7–6^{(8–10)}, 4–6
Loss	5–3	Dec 2021	M15 Doha, Qatar	World Tennis Tour	Grass	(Lebanon) Hady Habib	2–6, 6–4, 3–6
Loss	5–4	Jan 2022	Forlì, Italy	Challenger	Hard (i)	(Italy) Luca Nardi	3–6, 1–6
Loss	5–5	Aug 2022	M15 Jakarta, Indonesia	World Tennis Tour	Hard	(Japan) Shintaro Imai	3–6, 3–6
Win	6–5	Sep 2022	M25, Sintra, Portugal	World Tennis Tour	Hard	(Portugal) Duarte Vale	7–6^{(8–6)}, 3–6, 6–0
Loss	6–6	Dec 2022	M15, Sharm El Sheikh, Egypt	World Tennis Tour	Hard	(Poland) Martyn Pawelski	2–6, 4–6
Loss	6–7	Jan 2024	M25, Chennai, India	World Tennis Tour	Hard	(Australia) Bernard Tomic	4–6, 6–7^{(3–7)}
Win	7–7	Jun 2024	M15, Tianjin, China	World Tennis Tour	Hard	(Thailand) Wishaya Trongcharoenchaikul	6–3, 6–4
Loss	7–8	Sep 2024	M25, Nakhon Si Thammarat, Thailand	World Tennis Tour	Hard	(Thailand) Kasidit Samrej	3–6, 3–6
Loss	7–9	Sep 2025	M25, Nakhon Si Thammarat, Thailand	World Tennis Tour	Hard	(Czech Republic) Dominik Palán	4–6, 2–6
