= Shenzhen Luohu Challenger =

- 2024 Shenzhen Luohu Challenger

Defunct tennis tournament
- Event name: Shenzhen Luohu Challenger
- Location: Luohu District, Shenzhen, China
- Category: ATP Challenger Tour
- Surface: Hard
- Prize money: $82,000 (2024)

The Shenzhen Luohu Challenger was a professional tennis tournament played on hardcourts. It was part of the ATP Challenger Tour. It was held in Shenzhen, China in 2023 and in 2024.

== Past finals ==
=== Singles ===
Year	Champion	Runner-up	Score
2024	(South Africa) Lloyd Harris	(Australia) James Duckworth	6–3, 6–3
2023	(Australia) James Duckworth	(Hong Kong) Coleman Wong	6–0, 6–1

=== Doubles ===
Year	Champions	Runners-up	Score
2024	(Japan) Yuta Shimizu (Japan) James Trotter	(China) Wang Aoran (China) Zhou Yi	7–6^{(7–5)}, 7–6^{(7–4)}
2023	(China) Gao Xin (China) Wang Aoran	Mikalai Haliak (Greece) Markos Kalovelonis	6–4, 6–2
