= 2015 Lecoq Seoul Open – Women's doubles =

Women's doubles
- 2015 Lecoq Seoul Open

Final
- Champions: (Chinese Taipei) Chan Chin-wei (Chinese Taipei) Lee Ya-hsuan
- Runners-up: (South Korea) Hong Seung-yeon (South Korea) Kang Seo-kyung
- Score: 6–2, 6–1

Events
Singles	men	women
Doubles	men	women
← 2014 ·	Lecoq Seoul Open	· 2016 →

Chan Chin-wei and Chuang Chia-jung were the defending champions, but Chuang chose not to participate. Chan partnered Lee Ya-hsuan and successfully defended her title, defeating Hong Seung-yeon and Kang Seo-kyung in the final, 6–2, 6–1.

== Seeds ==
1. (Belgium) An-Sophie Mestach / (United Kingdom) Emily Webley-Smith (first round)
2. (Chinese Taipei) Chan Chin-wei / (Chinese Taipei) Lee Ya-hsuan (champions)
3. (Thailand) Varatchaya Wongteanchai / (Thailand) Varunya Wongteanchai (semifinals)
4. (Japan) Miyabi Inoue / (Japan) Akiko Omae (quarterfinals)

== Draw ==
=== Key ===
- Q = Qualifier
- WC = Wild card
- LL = Lucky loser
- Alt = Alternate
- SE = Special exempt
- PR = Protected ranking
- ITF = ITF entry
- JE = Junior exempt
- w/o = Walkover
- r = Retired
- d = Defaulted
- SR = Special ranking

First round
1	(Belgium) A-S Mestach (United Kingdom) E Webley-Smith	6	3	[8]
WC	(South Korea) S-y Hong (South Korea) S-k Kang	2	6	[10]
(South Korea) J-h Choi (Slovakia) Z Zlochová	1	6	[10]
(Japan) M Imanishi (Serbia) V Lukić	6	2	[2]
4	(Japan) M Inoue (Japan) A Omae	6	6
WC	(South Korea) S-j Kim (South Korea) C-w Lee	1	4
(South Korea) N-l Han (South Korea) M Yoo	6	6
WC	(South Korea) S-y Choi (South Korea) A Song	1	0
(Japan) E Sema (Japan) Y Sema	6	6
(Slovenia) D Jakupović (Russia) E Yashina	4	3
(Japan) N Hibino (Russia) K Lykina	2	2
3	(Thailand) Vara Wongteanchai (Thailand) Varu Wongteanchai	6	6
(South Korea) S-j Jang (Japan) R Sawayanagi	6	7^{7}
(South Korea) S-h Han (South Korea) Y-r Lee	4	6^{4}
(South Korea) H-h Hong (South Korea) S-r Lee	4	6^{6}
2	(Chinese Taipei) C-w Chan (Chinese Taipei) Y-h Lee	6	7^{8}

Quarterfinals
WC	(South Korea) S-y Hong (South Korea) S-k Kang	6	6
(South Korea) J-h Choi (Slovakia) Z Zlochová	4	1
4	(Japan) M Inoue (Japan) A Omae	7^{7}	6^{3}	[6]
(South Korea) N-l Han (South Korea) M Yoo	6^{5}	7^{7}	[10]
(Japan) E Sema (Japan) Y Sema	6	4	[7]
3	(Thailand) Vara Wongteanchai (Thailand) Varu Wongteanchai	3	6	[10]
(South Korea) S-j Jang (Japan) R Sawayanagi	3	1
2	(Chinese Taipei) C-w Chan (Chinese Taipei) Y-h Lee	6	6

Semifinals
WC	(South Korea) S-y Hong (South Korea) S-k Kang	4	7	[10]
(South Korea) N-l Han (South Korea) M Yoo	6	5	[2]
3	(Thailand) Vara Wongteanchai (Thailand) Varu Wongteanchai	3	4
2	(Chinese Taipei) C-w Chan (Chinese Taipei) Y-h Lee	6	6

Final
WC	(South Korea) S-y Hong (South Korea) S-k Kang	2	1
2	(Chinese Taipei) C-w Chan (Chinese Taipei) Y-h Lee	6	6
