= 2016 Lecoq Seoul Open – Singles =

Tennis competition

Singles
- 2016 Lecoq Seoul Open

Final
- Champion: (Ukraine) Sergiy Stakhovsky
- Runner-up: (Chinese Taipei) Lu Yen-hsun
- Score: 4–6, 6–3, 7–6^{(9–7)}

Events
Singles	Doubles
← 2015 ·	Lecoq Seoul Open	· 2017 →

Go Soeda was the defending champion, but chose not to defend his title.

Sergiy Stakhovsky won the title after defeating Lu Yen-hsun 4–6, 6–3, 7–6^{(9–7)} in the final.

== Seeds ==
1. (Australia) John Millman (quarterfinals, withdrew)
2. (South Korea) Chung Hyeon (withdrew, due to abdominal injury)
3. (Australia) Sam Groth (quarterfinals, retired)
4. (United Kingdom) Daniel Evans (first round)
5. (Chinese Taipei) Lu Yen-hsun (final)
6. (Japan) Tatsuma Ito (second round)
7. (Japan) Yūichi Sugita (second round)
8. (Slovakia) Lukáš Lacko (semifinals)
9. (Germany) Michael Berrer (second round, retired)

== Draw ==
=== Key ===
- Q = Qualifier
- WC = Wild card
- LL = Lucky loser
- Alt = Alternate
- SE = Special exempt
- PR = Protected ranking
- ITF = ITF entry
- JE = Junior exempt
- w/o = Walkover
- r = Retired
- d = Defaulted
- SR = Special ranking

=== Finals ===
Semifinals
8	(Slovakia) Lukáš Lacko	6^{4}	7	3
5	(Chinese Taipei) Lu Yen-hsun	7^{7}	5	6
(Russia) Alexander Kudryavtsev	2	4
(Ukraine) Sergiy Stakhovsky	6	6

Final
5	(Chinese Taipei) Lu Yen-hsun	6	3	6^{7}
(Ukraine) Sergiy Stakhovsky	4	6	7^{9}

=== Top half ===
First round
1	(Australia) J Millman	7	6
LL	(Japan) Shuichi Sekiguchi	5	4
Q	(Denmark) F Nielsen	7^{7}	3	6^{4}
Q	(United Kingdom) A Ward	6^{5}	6	7^{7}
(Russia) K Kravchuk	3	6	3
(Australia) M Barton	6	3	6
(Chinese Taipei) T Chen	3	3
8	(Slovakia) L Lacko	6	6
4	(United Kingdom) D Evans	3	3
(Slovenia) G Žemlja	6	6
(United States) A Sarkissian	3	2
(Chinese Taipei) J Jung	6	6
Q	(Japan) Yuya Kibi	3	2
(China) Z Zhang	6	6
(China) D Wu	6	2	4
5	(Chinese Taipei) Y-h Lu	4	6	6

Second round
1	(Australia) J Millman	6	6
Q	(United Kingdom) A Ward	4	2
(Australia) M Barton	4	6	4
8	(Slovakia) L Lacko	6	4	6
(Slovenia) G Žemlja	2	6	5
(Chinese Taipei) J Jung	6	4	7
(China) Z Zhang	3	4
5	(Chinese Taipei) Y-h Lu	6	6

Quarterfinals
1	(Australia) J Millman
8	(Slovakia) L Lacko	w/o
(Chinese Taipei) J Jung	4	4
5	(Chinese Taipei) Y-h Lu	6	6

Semifinals
8	(Slovakia) L Lacko	6^{4}	7	3
5	(Chinese Taipei) Y-h Lu	7^{7}	5	6

=== Bottom half ===
First round
6	(Japan) T Ito	6	6
WC	(South Korea) S-c Hong	4	2
(Russia) A Kudryavtsev	6	6
WC	(South Korea) J-s Nam	4	4
Q	(United Kingdom) L Broady	6	4	3
WC	(South Korea) S-w Kwon	3	6	6
(United States) M Krueger	6	3	2
3	(Australia) S Groth	4	6	6
7	(Japan) Y Sugita	6	6
WC	(South Korea) Kang Ho-gi	1	1
(South Korea) D-h Lee	6	6
(Australia) J-P Smith	4	4
(Switzerland) M Chiudinelli	4	4
(Ukraine) S Stakhovsky	6	6
(United States) A Krajicek	4	7^{7}	5
9	(Germany) M Berrer	6	6^{3}	7

Second round
6	(Japan) T Ito	6^{6}	5
(Russia) A Kudryavtsev	7^{8}	7
WC	(South Korea) S-w Kwon	4	6	4
3	(Australia) S Groth	6	4	6
7	(Japan) Y Sugita	5	7	4
(South Korea) D-h Lee	7	5	6
(Ukraine) S Stakhovsky	6	1
9	(Germany) M Berrer	0	0^{r}

Quarterfinals
(Russia) A Kudryavtsev	4
3	(Australia) S Groth	1^{r}
(South Korea) D-h Lee	5	2
(Ukraine) S Stakhovsky	7	6

Semifinals
(Russia) A Kudryavtsev	2	4
(Ukraine) S Stakhovsky	6	6
