= 2015 Lecoq Seoul Open – Men's singles =

Men's singles
- 2015 Lecoq Seoul Open

Final
- Champion: (Japan) Go Soeda
- Runner-up: (South Korea) Chung Hyeon
- Score: 3–6, 6–3, 6–3

Events
Singles	men	women
Doubles	men	women
← 2014 ·	Lecoq Seoul Open	· 2016 →

This was the first edition of the tournament.

Go Soeda won the title, defeating Chung Hyeon in the final, 3–6, 6–3, 6–3.

== Seeds ==
1. (Chinese Taipei) Lu Yen-hsun (semifinals)
2. (Japan) Go Soeda (champion)
3. (South Korea) Chung Hyeon (final)
4. (Japan) Tatsuma Ito (first round)
5. (Slovakia) Lukáš Lacko (withdrew due to fatigue)
6. (Ukraine) Illya Marchenko (first round)
7. (Russia) Alexander Kudryavtsev (second round)
8. (Chinese Taipei) Jimmy Wang (second round, retired)

== Draw ==
=== Key ===
- Q = Qualifier
- WC = Wild card
- LL = Lucky loser
- Alt = Alternate
- SE = Special exempt
- PR = Protected ranking
- ITF = ITF entry
- JE = Junior exempt
- w/o = Walkover
- r = Retired
- d = Defaulted
- SR = Special ranking

=== Finals ===
Semifinals
1	(Chinese Taipei) Lu Yen-hsun	4	7^{7}	4
3	(South Korea) Chung Hyeon	6	6^{4}	6
(China) Zhang Ze	1	6	4
2	(Japan) Go Soeda	6	3	6

Final
3	(South Korea) Chung Hyeon	6	3	3
2	(Japan) Go Soeda	3	6	6

=== Top half ===
First round
1	(Chinese Taipei) Y-h Lu	6	4	6
(Australia) L Saville	1	6	2
(Australia) J Smith	6^{5}	7^{7}	3
(United States) J Jenkins	7^{7}	6^{4}	6
LL	(Canada) P Bester	6	6
(Chinese Taipei) L-c Huang	3	2
(Chinese Taipei) T-h Yang	3	2
LL	(China) D Wu	6	6
3	(South Korea) H Chung	6	7^{7}
(United States) J Jung	2	6^{4}
(Japan) H Moriya	7	6^{4}	5
(Denmark) F Nielsen	5	7^{7}	7
Q	(South Africa) F Wolmarans	5	5
(United States) D Kudla	7	7
Q	(United States) M Giron	2	0
7	(Russia) A Kudryavtsev	6	6

Second round
1	(Chinese Taipei) Y-h Lu	6	4	6
(United States) J Jenkins	2	6	2
LL	(Canada) P Bester	2	4
LL	(China) D Wu	6	6
3	(South Korea) H Chung	6	6
(Denmark) F Nielsen	4	1
(United States) D Kudla	7^{7}	6
7	(Russia) A Kudryavtsev	6^{5}	1

Quarterfinals
1	(Chinese Taipei) Y-h Lu	7	6
LL	(China) D Wu	5	1
3	(South Korea) H Chung	6	6
(United States) D Kudla	1	2

Semifinals
1	(Chinese Taipei) Y-h Lu	4	7^{7}	4
3	(South Korea) H Chung	6	6^{4}	6

=== Bottom half ===
First round
6	(Ukraine) I Marchenko	2	6	4
SE	(Slovenia) G Žemlja	6	2	6
(China) Z Zhang	6	2	6
WC	(South Korea) J-s Nam	4	6	4
(Japan) Y Sugita	4	6^{4}
Q	(Bulgaria) D Kutrovsky	6	7^{7}
Q	(Australia) M Barton	6	7^{7}
4	(Japan) T Ito	2	6^{1}
8	(Chinese Taipei) J Wang	6	6
WC	(South Korea) S-w Kwon	4	4
WC	(South Korea) D-h Lee	2	6	6
(United States) D Nguyen	6	2	2
(Australia) A Bolt	7	4	6^{5}
(Japan) T Niki	5	6	7^{7}
LL	(China) Z Li	3	2
2	(Japan) G Soeda	6	6

Second round
SE	(Slovenia) G Žemlja	6^{3}	2
(China) Z Zhang	7^{7}	6
Q	(Bulgaria) D Kutrovsky	7^{9}	3
Q	(Australia) M Barton	6^{7}	0^{r}
8	(Chinese Taipei) J Wang	1	0^{r}
WC	(South Korea) D-h Lee	6	1
(Japan) T Niki	1	7^{7}	3
2	(Japan) G Soeda	6	6^{3}	6

Quarterfinals
(China) Z Zhang	3	7^{7}	6
Q	(Bulgaria) D Kutrovsky	6	6^{5}	2
WC	(South Korea) D-h Lee	7^{7}	6^{1}	3
2	(Japan) G Soeda	6^{5}	7^{7}	6

Semifinals
(China) Z Zhang	1	6	4
2	(Japan) G Soeda	6	3	6
