= 2015 Lecoq Seoul Open =

- Date: 11–17 May 2015 (ATP); 18–24 May 2015 (ITF)
- Edition: 1st (ATP); 2nd (ITF)
- Category: ATP Challenger Tour; ITF Women's Circuit
- Prize money: $50,000
- Surface: Hard
- Location: Seoul, South Korea

Champions

Men's singles
- (Japan) Go Soeda

Women's singles
- (Japan) Riko Sawayanagi

Men's doubles
- (China) Gong Maoxin / (Chinese Taipei) Peng Hsien-yin

Women's doubles
- (Chinese Taipei) Chan Chin-wei / (Chinese Taipei) Lee Ya-hsuan
← 2014 ·	Lecoq Seoul Open	· 2016 →

The 2015 Lecoq Seoul Open was a professional tennis tournament played on outdoor hard courts. It was the second edition of the tournament for women and the first edition for men. It was part of the 2015 ATP Challenger Tour and the 2015 ITF Women's Circuit, offering a total of $50,000 in prize money. It took place in Seoul, South Korea, on 11–17 May 2015 for men and 18–24 May 2015 women.

== Men's singles main draw entrants ==
=== Seeds ===
Country	Player	Rank^{1}	Seed
TPE	Lu Yen-hsun	64	1
JPN	Go Soeda	85	2
KOR	Chung Hyeon	88	3
JPN	Tatsuma Ito	98	4
~~SVK~~	~~Lukáš Lacko~~	~~100~~	~~5~~
UKR	Illya Marchenko	129	6
RUS	Alexander Kudryavtsev	130	7
TPE	Jimmy Wang	137	8

- ^{1} Rankings as of 4 May 2015

=== Other entrants ===
The following players received wildcards into the singles main draw:

- (South Korea) Lee Duck-hee
- (South Korea) Nam Ji-sung
- (South Korea) Kwon Soon-woo

The following players received entry from the qualifying draw:

- (Australia) Matthew Barton
- (United States) Marcos Giron
- (Bulgaria) Dimitar Kutrovsky
- (South Africa) Fritz Wolmarans

The following players received entry by lucky loser spots:

- (Canada) Philip Bester
- (China) Li Zhe
- (China) Wu Di

The following player received entry by a special exempt:

- (Slovenia) Grega Žemlja

== Women's singles main draw entrants ==
=== Seeds ===
Country	Player	Rank^{1}	Seed
BEL	An-Sophie Mestach	114	1
JPN	Nao Hibino	189	2
JPN	Naomi Osaka	191	3
THA	Varatchaya Wongteanchai	207	4
JPN	Miharu Imanishi	214	5
NED	Indy de Vroome	218	6
KOR	Jang Su-jeong	227	7
KOR	Han Na-lae	247	8

- ^{1} Rankings as of 11 May 2015

=== Other entrants ===
The following players received wildcards into the singles main draw:

- (South Korea) Ahn Yu-jin
- (South Korea) Hong Seung-yeon
- (South Korea) Kim Sun-jung
- (South Korea) Lee So-ra

The following players received entry from the qualifying draw:

- (South Korea) Han Sung-hee
- (South Korea) Kang Seo-kyung
- (Japan) Mari Osaka
- (Japan) Yurika Sema

== Champions ==
=== Men's singles ===
- (Japan) Go Soeda def. (South Korea) Chung Hyeon, 3–6, 6–3, 6–3

=== Women's singles ===
- (Japan) Riko Sawayanagi def. (South Korea) Jang Su-jeong, 6–4, 6–4

=== Men's doubles ===
- (China) Gong Maoxin / (Chinese Taipei) Peng Hsien-yin def. (South Korea) Lee Hyung-taik / (Thailand) Danai Udomchoke, 6–4, 7–5

=== Women's doubles ===
- (Chinese Taipei) Chan Chin-wei / (Chinese Taipei) Lee Ya-hsuan def. (South Korea) Hong Seung-yeon / (South Korea) Kang Seo-kyung, 6–2, 6–1
