= 2015 Lecoq Seoul Open – Men's doubles =

Men's doubles
- 2015 Lecoq Seoul Open

Final
- Champions: (China) Gong Maoxin (Chinese Taipei) Peng Hsien-yin
- Runners-up: (South Korea) Lee Hyung-taik (Thailand) Danai Udomchoke
- Score: 6–4, 7–5

Events
Singles	men	women
Doubles	men	women
← 2014 ·	Lecoq Seoul Open	· 2016 →

This was the first edition of the tournament.

Gong Maoxin and Peng Hsien-yin won the title, defeating Lee Hyung-taik and Danai Udomchoke in the final, 6–4, 7–5.

== Seeds ==
1. (China) Gong Maoxin / (South Korea) Peng Hsien-yin (champions)
2. (United States) James Cerretani / (Australia) Andrew Whittington (first round)
3. (Thailand) Sanchai Ratiwatana / (Thailand) Sonchat Ratiwatana (semifinals)
4. (Japan) Toshihide Matsui / (Denmark) Frederik Nielsen (quarterfinals)

== Draw ==
=== Key ===
- Q = Qualifier
- WC = Wild card
- LL = Lucky loser
- Alt = Alternate
- SE = Special exempt
- PR = Protected ranking
- ITF = ITF entry
- JE = Junior exempt
- w/o = Walkover
- r = Retired
- d = Defaulted
- SR = Special ranking

First round
1	(China) M Gong (Chinese Taipei) H-y Peng	6	6
LL	(South Korea) S-w Kwon (South Korea) D-h Lee	2	4
(Belarus) I Ivashka (Russia) A Kudryavtsev	6	2	[7]
(Canada) P Bester (Australia) O Jasika	4	6	[10]
3	(Thailand) Sa Ratiwatana (Thailand) So Ratiwatana	6	6
WC	(South Korea) S-y Kim (South Korea) Lee Dae-hee	3	2
(Bulgaria) D Kutrovsky (United States) D Nguyen	4	6	[5]
(Japan) Yuuya Kibi (Japan) T Niki	6	4	[10]
WC	(South Korea) H-t Lee (Thailand) D Udomchoke	7	6
(Republic of Ireland) J Cluskey (Republic of Ireland) D O'Hare	5	4
(Chinese Taipei) L-c Huang (Chinese Taipei) T-h Yang	0	3
4	(Japan) T Matsui (Denmark) F Nielsen	6	6
Q	(China) Y Bai (China) D Wu	3	2
(Chinese Taipei) H-h Lee (China) Z Zhang	6	6
WC	(South Korea) J-s Nam (South Korea) M-k Song	7^{7}	6
2	(United States) J Cerretani (Australia) A Whittington	6^{4}	1

Quarterfinals
1	(China) M Gong (Chinese Taipei) H-y Peng	6	3	[10]
(Canada) P Bester (Australia) O Jasika	4	6	[6]
3	(Thailand) Sa Ratiwatana (Thailand) So Ratiwatana	3	7	[10]
(Japan) Y Kibi (Japan) T Niki	6	5	[6]
WC	(South Korea) H-t Lee (Thailand) D Udomchoke	5	6	[10]
4	(Japan) T Matsui (Denmark) F Nielsen	7	4	[7]
(Chinese Taipei) H-h Lee (China) Z Zhang	6	6
WC	(South Korea) J-s Nam (South Korea) M-k Song	3	4

Semifinals
1	(China) M Gong (Chinese Taipei) H-y Peng	6	6
3	(Thailand) Sa Ratiwatana (Thailand) So Ratiwatana	4	3
WC	(South Korea) H-t Lee (Thailand) D Udomchoke	6	6
(Chinese Taipei) H-h Lee (China) Z Zhang	2	2

Final
1	(China) M Gong (Chinese Taipei) H-y Peng	6	7
WC	(South Korea) H-t Lee (Thailand) D Udomchoke	4	5
