= 2015 Lecoq Seoul Open – Women's singles =

Women's singles
- 2015 Lecoq Seoul Open

Final
- Champion: (Japan) Riko Sawayanagi
- Runner-up: (South Korea) Jang Su-jeong
- Score: 6–4, 6–4

Events
Singles	men	women
Doubles	men	women
← 2014 ·	Lecoq Seoul Open	· 2016 →

Misaki Doi was the defending champion, but she chose to participate at the 2015 Nürnberger Versicherungscup instead.

Riko Sawayanagi won the title, defeating Jang Su-jeong in the final, 6–4, 6–4.

== Seeds ==
1. (Belgium) An-Sophie Mestach (semifinals)
2. (Japan) Nao Hibino (first round)
3. (Japan) Naomi Osaka (quarterfinals)
4. (Thailand) Varatchaya Wongteanchai (semifinals)
5. (Japan) Miharu Imanishi (second round)
6. (Netherlands) Indy de Vroome (first round)
7. (South Korea) Jang Su-jeong (final)
8. (South Korea) Han Na-lae (quarterfinals)

== Main draw ==
=== Key ===
- Q = Qualifier
- WC = Wild card
- LL = Lucky loser
- Alt = Alternate
- SE = Special exempt
- PR = Protected ranking
- ITF = ITF entry
- JE = Junior exempt
- w/o = Walkover
- r = Retired
- d = Defaulted
- SR = Special ranking

=== Finals ===
Semifinals
1	(Belgium) An-Sophie Mestach	5	6	6^{4}
7	(South Korea) Jang Su-jeong	7	3	7^{7}
4	(Thailand) Varatchaya Wongteanchai	4	3
(Japan) Riko Sawayanagi	6	6

Final
7	(South Korea) Jang Su-jeong	4	4
(Japan) Riko Sawayanagi	6	6

=== Top half ===
First round
1	(Belgium) A-S Mestach	7	6
(Russia) K Lykina	5	3
Q	(Japan) Y Sema	6	5	3
Q	(Japan) M Osaka	4	7	6
(Chinese Taipei) Y-h Lee	6	6
WC	(South Korea) S-j Kim	0	1
(Slovenia) D Jakupović	2	6	6
6	(Netherlands) I de Vroome	6	3	3
3	(Japan) N Osaka	6	6
Q	(South Korea) S-h Han	1	0
(Japan) A Omae	4	3
WC	(South Korea) S-y Hong	6	6
(South Korea) J-h Choi	0	4
(Japan) M Inoue	6	6
(South Korea) H-h Hong	6^{4}	1
7	(South Korea) S-j Jang	7^{7}	6

Second round
1	(Belgium) A-S Mestach	7	6
Q	(Japan) M Osaka	5	3
(Chinese Taipei) Y-h Lee	1	3
(Slovenia) D Jakupović	6	6
3	(Japan) N Osaka	6	6
WC	(South Korea) S-y Hong	4	4
(Japan) M Inoue	1	6	6^{6}
7	(South Korea) S-j Jang	6	3	7^{8}

Quarterfinals
1	(Belgium) A-S Mestach	4	7	6
(Slovenia) D Jakupović	6	5	4
3	(Japan) N Osaka	6	6^{4}	2
7	(South Korea) S-j Jang	3	7^{7}	6

Semifinals
1	(Belgium) A-S Mestach	5	6	6^{4}
7	(South Korea) S-j Jang	7	3	7^{7}

=== Bottom half ===
First round
8	(South Korea) N-l Han	7^{7}	6
(Serbia) V Lukić	6^{0}	3
(Japan) E Sema	6	6
WC	(South Korea) S-r Lee	2	3
(Slovakia) Z Zlochová	6	6
WC	(South Korea) Y-j Ahn	4	1
(United Kingdom) E Webley-Smith	0	3
4	(Thailand) V Wongteanchai	6	6
5	(Japan) M Imanishi	6	6
(United States) T Kinard	3	4
(United States) K Ahn	3	6	7^{7}
Q	(South Korea) S-k Kang	6	3	6^{2}
(Japan) R Sawayanagi	6	6
(Russia) E Yashina	1	3
(South Korea) Y-r Lee	1	6	7^{7}
2	(Japan) N Hibino	6	2	6^{1}

Second round
8	(South Korea) N-l Han	6	5	6
(Japan) E Sema	4	7	3
(Slovakia) Z Zlochová	1	1
4	(Thailand) V Wongteanchai	6	6
5	(Japan) M Imanishi	2	5
(United States) K Ahn	6	7
(Japan) R Sawayanagi	6	6
(South Korea) Y-r Lee	4	4

Quarterfinals
8	(South Korea) N-l Han	3	6	4
4	(Thailand) V Wongteanchai	6	2	6
(United States) K Ahn	6	6^{6}	3
(Japan) R Sawayanagi	1	7^{8}	6

Semifinals
4	(Thailand) V Wongteanchai	4	3
(Japan) R Sawayanagi	6	6
