= 2017 Seoul Open Challenger =

- Date: 8–14 May
- Edition: 3rd
- Surface: Hard
- Location: Seoul, South Korea

Champions

Singles
- (Italy) Thomas Fabbiano

Doubles
- (Chinese Taipei) Hsieh Cheng-peng / (Chinese Taipei) Peng Hsien-yin
← 2016 ·	Seoul Open Challenger	· 2018 →

The 2017 Seoul Open Challenger was a professional tennis tournament played on outdoor hard courts. It was the third edition of the tournament. It was part of the 2017 ATP Challenger Tour. It took place in Seoul, South Korea, on 8–14 May 2017.

== Singles main draw entrants ==
=== Seeds ===
Country	Player	Rank^{1}	Seed
TPE	Lu Yen-hsun	56	1
~~KOR~~	~~Chung Hyeon~~	~~78~~	~~2~~
ISR	Dudi Sela	99	3
RUS	Konstantin Kravchuk	105	4
CAN	Vasek Pospisil	111	5
SLO	Blaž Kavčič	123	6
UKR	Illya Marchenko	125	7
BEL	Ruben Bemelmans	132	8

- ^{1} Rankings as of 1 May 2017.

=== Other entrants ===
The following players received wildcards into the singles main draw:

- (South Korea) Chung Hong
- (South Korea) Chung Yun-seong
- (South Korea) Hong Seong-chan
- (South Korea) Kim Young-seok

The following player received entry into the singles main draw as an alternate:

- (Serbia) Marko Tepavac

The following player received entry into the singles main draw as a special exempt:

- (United Kingdom) Liam Broady

The following player received entry into the singles main draw using a protected ranking:

- (United Kingdom) Alexander Ward

The following players received entry from the qualifying draw:

- (Canada) Félix Auger-Aliassime
- (United States) Austin Krajicek
- (United States) Daniel Nguyen
- (Japan) Shuichi Sekiguchi

The following player received entry as a lucky loser:

- (Australia) Luke Saville

== Champions ==
=== Singles ===
- (Italy) Thomas Fabbiano def. (South Korea) Kwon Soon-woo 1–6, 6–4, 6–3.

=== Doubles ===
- (Chinese Taipei) Hsieh Cheng-peng / (Chinese Taipei) Peng Hsien-yin def. (Italy) Thomas Fabbiano / (Israel) Dudi Sela 5–1 ret.
