= 2018 Seoul Open Challenger – Singles =

Singles
- 2018 Seoul Open Challenger

Final
- Champion: (United States) Mackenzie McDonald
- Runner-up: (Australia) Jordan Thompson
- Score: 1–6, 6–4, 6–1

Events
Singles	Doubles
- Seoul Open Challenger

Thomas Fabbiano was the defending champion but chose not to defend his title.

Mackenzie McDonald won the title after defeating Jordan Thompson 1–6, 6–4, 6–1 in the final.

== Seeds ==
1. (Canada) Vasek Pospisil (second round)
2. (Israel) Dudi Sela (first round)
3. (Australia) Jordan Thompson (final)
4. (Chinese Taipei) Lu Yen-hsun (second round, retired)
5. (United States) Mackenzie McDonald (champion)
6. (Japan) Go Soeda (second round)
7. (Chinese Taipei) Jason Jung (second round)
8. (Japan) Tatsuma Ito (semifinals)

== Draw ==
Key

- Q = Qualifier
- WC = Wild card
- LL = Lucky loser
- Alt = Alternate
- ITF = ITF entry
- PR = Protected ranking
- SR = Special ranking
- SE = Special exempt
- JE = Junior exempt
- JR = Junior Accelerator Programme entrant
- CO = College Accelerator Programme entrant
- NG = Next Gen Accelerator Program entrant
- w/o = Walkover
- r = Retired
- d = Defaulted

=== Finals ===
Semifinals
(Australia) Jason Kubler	3	6	4
3	(Australia) Jordan Thompson	6	3	6
5	(United States) Mackenzie McDonald	6	7^{7}
8	(Japan) Tatsuma Ito	4	6^{4}

Final
3	(Australia) Jordan Thompson	6	4	1
5	(United States) Mackenzie McDonald	1	6	6

=== Top half ===
First round
1	(Canada) V Pospisil	4	6	6
(Canada) B Schnur	6	1	3
(Australia) J Kubler	6	6
(China) Ze Zhang	1	1
(South Korea) S-w Kwon	6	1	6
(France) M Janvier	1	6	3
(United States) M Giron	6	3	4
6	(Japan) G Soeda	1	6	6
3	(Australia) J Thompson	6	6
WC	(South Korea) Kim Young-seok	1	2
(Canada) F Peliwo	7	3	1^{r}
Q	(South Korea) Son Ji-hoon	5	6	3
Q	(Japan) Renta Tokuda	1	2
(Chinese Taipei) T-h Yang	6	6
Q	(Japan) Makoto Ochi	4	0
7	(Chinese Taipei) J Jung	6	6

Second round
1	(Canada) V Pospisil	3	3
(Australia) J Kubler	6	6
(South Korea) S-w Kwon	6	6
6	(Japan) G Soeda	4	4
3	(Australia) J Thompson	7	7^{11}
Q	(South Korea) J-h Son	5	6^{9}
(Chinese Taipei) T-h Yang	6	7
7	(Chinese Taipei) J Jung	4	5

Quarterfinals
(Australia) J Kubler	6	6
(South Korea) S-w Kwon	3	4
3	(Australia) J Thompson	6	6
(Chinese Taipei) T-h Yang	1	3

Semifinals
(Australia) J Kubler	3	6	4
3	(Australia) J Thompson	6	3	6

=== Bottom half ===
First round
5	(United States) M McDonald	7	6
WC	(South Korea) U-s Park	5	2
SE	(Poland) K Majchrzak	6	6
(Japan) Y Takahashi	2	3
(South Africa) L Harris	5	6	6
WC	(South Korea) Y-s Chung	7	3	0
(Australia) M Banes	4	1
4	(Chinese Taipei) Y-h Lu	6	6
8	(Japan) T Ito	6	6
(South Korea) D-h Lee	1	3
(Japan) Y Uchiyama	6	4	5
WC	(South Korea) S-c Hong	2	6	7
Q	(Japan) Yo Watanuki	6	6
(Australia) D Kelly	3	4
(China) D Wu	6	2	6
2	(Israel) D Sela	3	6	0

Second round
5	(United States) M McDonald	6	6
SE	(Poland) K Majchrzak	3	4
(South Africa) L Harris	6	3
4	(Chinese Taipei) Y-h Lu	4	0^{r}
8	(Japan) T Ito	7	6
WC	(South Korea) S-c Hong	5	1
Q	(Japan) Yo Watanuki	4	5
(China) D Wu	6	7

Quarterfinals
5	(United States) M McDonald	6^{4}	7^{10}	6
(South Africa) L Harris	7^{7}	6^{8}	3
8	(Japan) T Ito	7	3	6
(China) D Wu	5	6	2

Semifinals
5	(United States) M McDonald	6	7^{7}
8	(Japan) T Ito	4	6^{4}
