= 2017 Seoul Open Challenger – Doubles =

Doubles
- 2017 Seoul Open Challenger

Final
- Champions: (Chinese Taipei) Hsieh Cheng-peng (Chinese Taipei) Peng Hsien-yin
- Runners-up: (Italy) Thomas Fabbiano (Israel) Dudi Sela
- Score: 5–1 ret.

Events
Singles	Doubles
← 2016 ·	Seoul Open Challenger	· 2018 →

Matt Reid and John-Patrick Smith were the defending champions but chose not to defend their title.

Hsieh Cheng-peng and Peng Hsien-yin won the title after Thomas Fabbiano and Dudi Sela retired trailing 1–5 in the first set.

== Seeds ==
1. (Thailand) Sanchai Ratiwatana / (Thailand) Sonchat Ratiwatana (quarterfinals)
2. (Australia) Bradley Mousley / (Australia) Luke Saville (first round)
3. (Chinese Taipei) Hsieh Cheng-peng / (Chinese Taipei) Peng Hsien-yin (champions)
4. (Australia) Steven de Waard / (New Zealand) Ben McLachlan (first round)

== Draw ==
=== Key ===
- Q = Qualifier
- WC = Wild card
- LL = Lucky loser
- Alt = Alternate
- SE = Special exempt
- PR = Protected ranking
- ITF = ITF entry
- JE = Junior exempt
- w/o = Walkover
- r = Retired
- d = Defaulted
- SR = Special ranking

First round
1	(Thailand) Sa Ratiwatana (Thailand) So Ratiwatana	6	4	[10]
WC	(South Korea) Kim Cheong-eui (South Korea) Kim Yu-seob	1	6	[7]
(Italy) T Fabbiano (Israel) D Sela	1
(Belgium) R Bemelmans (Germany) P Petzschner	1^{r}
4	(Australia) S de Waard (New Zealand) B McLachlan	5	1
(United States) A Krajicek (United States) J Withrow	7	6
WC	(South Korea) D-h Lee (Japan) G Soeda	6	6
(Switzerland) M Chiudinelli (Japan) T Ito	1	4
PR	(Australia) M Ebden (United Kingdom) B Klein	4	6	[10]
(Republic of Ireland) D O'Hare (United Kingdom) J Salisbury	6	1	[7]
WC	(South Korea) Y-s Chung (South Korea) S-w Kwon	3	4
3	(Chinese Taipei) C-p Hsieh (Chinese Taipei) H-y Peng	6	6
Q	(Austria) L Miedler (Japan) T Niki	6	6
(Australia) O Jasika (Japan) A Santillan	1	4
(South Africa) R Roelofse (Chinese Taipei) C-h Yi	7	5	[10]
2	(Australia) B Mousley (Australia) L Saville	5	7	[5]

Quarterfinals
1	(Thailand) Sa Ratiwatana (Thailand) So Ratiwatana	6	2	[2]
(Italy) T Fabbiano (Israel) D Sela	3	6	[10]
(United States) A Krajicek (United States) J Withrow	6	6
WC	(South Korea) D-h Lee (Japan) G Soeda	3	4
PR	(Australia) M Ebden (United Kingdom) B Klein	6	3	[10]
3	(Chinese Taipei) C-p Hsieh (Chinese Taipei) H-y Peng	3	6	[12]
Q	(Austria) L Miedler (Japan) T Niki	3	3
(South Africa) R Roelofse (Chinese Taipei) C-h Yi	6	6

Semifinals
(Italy) T Fabbiano (Israel) D Sela	3	6	[10]
(United States) A Krajicek (United States) J Withrow	6	3	[4]
3	(Chinese Taipei) C-p Hsieh (Chinese Taipei) H-y Peng	7	6
(South Africa) R Roelofse (Chinese Taipei) C-h Yi	5	3

Final
(Italy) T Fabbiano (Israel) D Sela	1^{r}
3	(Chinese Taipei) C-p Hsieh (Chinese Taipei) H-y Peng	5
