= 2016 Lecoq Seoul Open – Doubles =

Doubles
- 2016 Lecoq Seoul Open

Final
- Champion: (Australia) Matt Reid (Australia) John-Patrick Smith
- Runner-up: (China) Gong Maoxin (Chinese Taipei) Yi Chu-huan
- Score: 6–3, 7–5

Events
Singles	Doubles
← 2015 ·	Lecoq Seoul Open	· 2017 →

Gong Maoxin and Peng Hsien-yin were the defending champions, but Peng chose not to participate this year. Gong chose to partner with Yi.

Gong failed to defend his title, losing in the finals to Matt Reid and John-Patrick Smith 6–3, 7–5.

== Seeds ==
1. (Australia) Sam Groth / (India) Leander Paes (quarterfinals)
2. (Thailand) Sanchai Ratiwatana / (Thailand) Sonchat Ratiwatana (first round)
3. (India) Purav Raja / (India) Divij Sharan (semifinals)
4. (Denmark) Frederik Nielsen / (Republic of Ireland) David O'Hare (first round)

== Draw ==
=== Key ===
- Q = Qualifier
- WC = Wild card
- LL = Lucky loser
- Alt = Alternate
- SE = Special exempt
- PR = Protected ranking
- ITF = ITF entry
- JE = Junior exempt
- w/o = Walkover
- r = Retired
- d = Defaulted
- SR = Special ranking

First round
1	(Australia) S Groth (India) L Paes	6	6
WC	(South Korea) Jeong Yeong-seok (South Korea) Lee Dae-hee	4	2
Alt	(United States) A Sarkissian (United States) Connor Smith	6	5	[9]
(China) M Gong (Chinese Taipei) C-h Yi	4	7	[11]
3	(India) P Raja (India) D Sharan	6	6
(United States) A Krajicek (United States) M Krueger	4	2
WC	(South Korea) Y-s Chung (South Korea) S-w Kwon	1	6^{4}
(Russia) A Kudrayvtsev (Ukraine) S Stakhovsky	6	7^{7}
(Australia) M Reid (Australia) J-P Smith	6	6
WC	(South Korea) D-h Lee (Japan) T Matsui	2	4
(United States) J Cerretani (United States) M Schnur	6	6
4	(Denmark) F Nielsen (Republic of Ireland) D O'Hare	2	4
(Japan) T Ito (Chinese Taipei) Y-h Lu	5	3
(Chinese Taipei) T Chen (China) Z Zhang	7	6
Alt	(United Kingdom) L Broady (United Kingdom) A Ward	7^{7}	2	[10]
2	(Thailand) Sa Ratiwatana (Thailand) So Ratiwatana	6^{4}	6	[8]

Quarterfinals
1	(Australia) S Groth (India) L Paes	6^{1}	3
(China) M Gong (Chinese Taipei) C-h Yi	7^{7}	6
3	(India) P Raja (India) D Sharan	7^{8}	7^{7}
(Russia) A Kudrayvtsev (Ukraine) S Stakhovsky	6^{6}	6^{5}
(Australia) M Reid (Australia) J-P Smith	6^{5}	6	[10]
(United States) J Cerretani (United States) M Schnur	7^{7}	4	[8]
(Chinese Taipei) T Chen (China) Z Zhang	6	5	[7]
Alt	(United Kingdom) L Broady (United Kingdom) A Ward	3	7	[10]

Semifinals
(China) M Gong (Chinese Taipei) C-h Yi	6^{5}	6	[10]
3	(India) P Raja (India) D Sharan	7^{7}	3	[8]
(Australia) M Reid (Australia) J-P Smith	6	6
Alt	(United Kingdom) L Broady (United Kingdom) A Ward	3	3

Final
(China) M Gong (Chinese Taipei) C-h Yi	3	5
(Australia) M Reid (Australia) J-P Smith	6	7
