= 2025 Seoul Open Challenger – Singles =

Singles
- 2025 Seoul Open Challenger

Final
- Champion: (Japan) Sho Shimabukuro
- Runner-up: (Hong Kong) Coleman Wong
- Score: 6–4, 6–3

Events
Singles	Doubles
← 2024 ·	Seoul Open Challenger	· 2026 →

Nikoloz Basilashvili was the defending champion but chose not to defend his title.

Sho Shimabukuro won the title after defeating Coleman Wong 6–4, 6–3 in the final.

== Seeds ==
1. (Australia) James Duckworth (first round)
2. (China) Bu Yunchaokete (quarterfinals)
3. (Japan) Yoshihito Nishioka (second round)
4. (Austria) Jurij Rodionov (quarterfinals)
5. (Hong Kong) Coleman Wong (final)
6. (Portugal) Henrique Rocha (first round)
7. (Japan) Yosuke Watanuki (first round, retired)
8. (Japan) Taro Daniel (second round)

== Draw ==
Key

- Q = Qualifier
- WC = Wild card
- LL = Lucky loser
- Alt = Alternate
- ITF = ITF entry
- PR = Protected ranking
- SR = Special ranking
- SE = Special exempt
- JE = Junior exempt
- JR = Junior Accelerator Programme entrant
- CO = College Accelerator Programme entrant
- NG = Next Gen Accelerator Program entrant
- w/o = Walkover
- r = Retired
- d = Defaulted

=== Finals ===
Semifinals
(Japan) Sho Shimabukuro	6	4	6
(Sweden) Elias Ymer	1	6	3
(China) Zhou Yi	6^{2}	6	2
5	(Hong Kong) Coleman Wong	7^{7}	4	6

Final
(Japan) Sho Shimabukuro	6	6
5	(Hong Kong) Coleman Wong	4	3

=== Top half ===
First round
1	(Australia) J Duckworth	6	5	3
(Japan) R Noguchi	1	7	6
(Australia) O Jasika	3	7	6^{4}
(Japan) S Shimabukuro	6	5	7^{7}
Q	(Thailand) K Samrej	6	6
Q	(Japan) Yuki Mochizuki	4	3
(United Kingdom) O Crawford	6	6
6	(Portugal) H Rocha	1	4
4	(Austria) J Rodionov	7^{7}	6
Q	(Australia) P Sekulic	6^{4}	4
(Japan) Y Shimizu	7	6
Q	(Japan) M Imamura	5	4
(Japan) Renta Tokuda	7	1	0
(Sweden) E Ymer	5	6	6
Q	(Japan) K Isomura	5
7	(Japan) Y Watanuki	2^{r}

Second round
(Japan) R Noguchi	4	3
(Japan) S Shimabukuro	6	6
Q	(Thailand) K Samrej	6	3	6
(United Kingdom) O Crawford	4	6	4
4	(Austria) J Rodionov	2	7	6
(Japan) Y Shimizu	6	5	4
(Sweden) E Ymer	6	6
Q	(Japan) K Isomura	2	3

Quarterfinals
(Japan) S Shimabukuro	6	6
Q	(Thailand) K Samrej	3	4
4	(Austria) J Rodionov	4	6	2
(Sweden) E Ymer	6	3	6

Semifinals
(Japan) S Shimabukuro	6	4	6
(Sweden) E Ymer	1	6	3

=== Bottom half ===
First round
8	(Japan) T Daniel	7	5	6
(Japan) Y Uchiyama	5	7	2
WC	(South Korea) Shin San-hui	6^{0}	0
(China) Y Zhou	7^{7}	6
(Portugal) F Ferreira Silva	6	6
(United States) G Johns	4	1
(Czech Republic) H Bartoň	3	2
3	(Japan) Y Nishioka	6	6
5	(Hong Kong) C Wong	6	6
WC	(South Korea) H Chung	3	2
(Croatia) D Ajduković	3	4
(Chinese Taipei) Y-h Hsu	6	6
WC	(South Korea) Shin Woo-bin	4	2
(Switzerland) M-A Hüsler	6	6
Q	(South Korea) U-s Park	5	4
2	(China) Y Bu	7	6

Second round
8	(Japan) T Daniel	7^{10}	3	0
(China) Y Zhou	6^{8}	6	6
(Portugal) F Ferreira Silva	6	5	7^{7}
3	(Japan) Y Nishioka	0	7	6^{5}
5	(Hong Kong) C Wong	6	7^{7}
(Chinese Taipei) Y-h Hsu	4	6^{3}
(Switzerland) M-A Hüsler	1	6	1
2	(China) Y Bu	6	4	6

Quarterfinals
(China) Y Zhou	7^{8}	6
(Portugal) F Ferreira Silva	6^{6}	3
5	(Hong Kong) C Wong	6	6
2	(China) Y Bu	3	4

Semifinals
(China) Y Zhou	6^{2}	6	2
5	(Hong Kong) C Wong	7^{7}	4	6
