= 2018 Seoul Open Challenger =

- Date: 30 April – 6 May
- Edition: 4th
- Surface: Hard
- Location: Seoul, South Korea

Champions

Singles
- (United States) Mackenzie McDonald

Doubles
- (Japan) Toshihide Matsui / (Denmark) Frederik Nielsen
← 2017 ·	Seoul Open Challenger	· 2019 →

The 2018 Seoul Open Challenger was a professional tennis tournament played on outdoor hard courts. It was the fourth edition of the tournament. It was part of the 2018 ATP Challenger Tour. It took place in Seoul, South Korea, between 30 April and 6 May 2018.

== Singles main draw entrants ==
=== Seeds ===
Country	Player	Rank^{1}	Seed
CAN	Vasek Pospisil	82	1
ISR	Dudi Sela	96	2
AUS	Jordan Thompson	98	3
TPE	Lu Yen-hsun	112	4
USA	Mackenzie McDonald	141	5
JPN	Go Soeda	145	6
TPE	Jason Jung	154	7
JPN	Tatsuma Ito	176	8

- ^{1} Rankings as of 23 April 2018.

=== Other entrants ===
The following players received wildcards into the singles main draw:

- (South Korea) Chung Yun-seong
- (South Korea) Hong Seong-chan
- (South Korea) Kim Young-seok
- (South Korea) Park Ui-sung

The following player received entry into the singles main draw as a special exempt:

- (Poland) Kamil Majchrzak

The following players received entry from the qualifying draw:

- (Japan) Makoto Ochi
- (South Korea) Son Ji-hoon
- (Japan) Renta Tokuda
- (Japan) Yosuke Watanuki

== Champions ==
=== Singles ===
- (United States) Mackenzie McDonald def. (Australia) Jordan Thompson 1–6, 6–4, 6–1.

=== Doubles ===
- (Japan) Toshihide Matsui / (Denmark) Frederik Nielsen def. (Chinese Taipei) Chen Ti / (Chinese Taipei) Yi Chu-huan 6–4, 7–6^{(7–3)}.
