= 2018 Seoul Open Challenger – Doubles =

Doubles
- 2018 Seoul Open Challenger

Final
- Champions: (Japan) Toshihide Matsui (Denmark) Frederik Nielsen
- Runners-up: (Chinese Taipei) Chen Ti (Chinese Taipei) Yi Chu-huan
- Score: 6–4, 7–6^{(7–3)}

Events
Singles	Doubles
← 2017 ·	Seoul Open Challenger	· 2019 →

In the 2018 Seoul Open Challenger Doubles tennis tournament, Hsieh Cheng-peng and Peng Hsien-yin were the defending champions but chose to defend their title with different partners. Hsieh partnered Christopher Rungkat but lost in the quarterfinals to Toshihide Matsui and Frederik Nielsen. Peng partnered Aliaksandr Bury but lost in the semifinals to Chen Ti and Yi Chu-huan.

Matsui and Nielsen won the title after defeating Chen and Yi 6–4, 7–6^{(7–3)} in the final.

== Seeds ==
1. (Chinese Taipei) Hsieh Cheng-peng / (Indonesia) Christopher Rungkat (quarterfinals)
2. (Thailand) Sanchai Ratiwatana / (Thailand) Sonchat Ratiwatana (first round)
3. (Belarus) Aliaksandr Bury / (Chinese Taipei) Peng Hsien-yin (semifinals)
4. (Australia) Matt Reid / (Israel) Dudi Sela (quarterfinals)

== Draw ==
=== Key ===
- Q = Qualifier
- WC = Wild card
- LL = Lucky loser
- Alt = Alternate
- SE = Special exempt
- PR = Protected ranking
- ITF = ITF entry
- JE = Junior exempt
- w/o = Walkover
- r = Retired
- d = Defaulted
- SR = Special ranking

First round
1	(Chinese Taipei) C-p Hsieh (Indonesia) C Rungkat	6	3	[10]
WC	(South Korea) Kim Yu-seob (South Korea) Lim Hyung-chan	4	6	[2]
(Japan) T Matsui (Denmark) F Nielsen	6	6
WC	(South Korea) Kim Young-seok (South Korea) D-h Lee	4	2
4	(Australia) M Reid (Israel) D Sela	1	6	[10]
LL	(Australia) M Banes (Australia) B Ellis	6	3	[8]
(Japan) T Ito (United States) M McDonald	4	6	[10]
WC	(South Korea) Lim Min-seob (South Korea) Yoon Il-sang	6	3	[2]
(Philippines) R Gonzales (Chinese Taipei) J Jung	4	6	[12]
Q	(South Korea) Y-s Chung (Japan) Yo Watanuki	6	2	[10]
(Poland) K Majchrzak (Australia) L Saville	2	4
3	(Belarus) A Bury (Chinese Taipei) H-y Peng	6	6
(China) D Wu (China) Ze Zhang	6	6
(China) M Gong (Japan) Y Uchiyama	2	3
(Chinese Taipei) T Chen (Chinese Taipei) C-h Yi	7^{8}	4	[10]
2	(Thailand) Sa Ratiwatana (Thailand) So Ratiwatana	6^{6}	6	[8]

Quarterfinals
1	(Chinese Taipei) C-p Hsieh (Indonesia) C Rungkat	6^{2}	1
(Japan) T Matsui (Denmark) F Nielsen	7^{7}	6
4	(Australia) M Reid (Israel) D Sela	4	5
(Japan) T Ito (United States) M McDonald	6	7
(Philippines) R Gonzales (Chinese Taipei) J Jung	4	6	[6]
3	(Belarus) A Bury (Chinese Taipei) H-y Peng	6	1	[10]
(China) D Wu (China) Ze Zhang	5	2
(Chinese Taipei) T Chen (Chinese Taipei) C-h Yi	7	6

Semifinals
(Japan) T Matsui (Denmark) F Nielsen	6	3	[15]
(Japan) T Ito (United States) M McDonald	4	6	[13]
3	(Belarus) A Bury (Chinese Taipei) H-y Peng	4	6^{4}
(Chinese Taipei) T Chen (Chinese Taipei) C-h Yi	6	7^{7}

Final
(Japan) T Matsui (Denmark) F Nielsen	6	7^{7}
(Chinese Taipei) T Chen (Chinese Taipei) C-h Yi	4	6^{3}
