= 2019 Seoul Open Challenger =

- Date: 29 April – 5 May
- Edition: 5th
- Surface: Hard
- Location: Seoul, South Korea

Champions

Singles
- (South Korea) Kwon Soon-woo

Doubles
- (Australia) Max Purcell / (Australia) Luke Saville
← 2018 ·	Seoul Open Challenger	· 2022 →

The 2019 Seoul Open Challenger was a professional tennis tournament played on outdoor hard courts. It was the fifth edition of the tournament. It was part of the 2019 ATP Challenger Tour. It took place in Seoul, South Korea, between 29 April and 5 May 2019.

== Singles main draw entrants ==
=== Seeds ===
Country	Player	Rank^{1}	Seed
~~AUS~~	~~Jordan Thompson~~	~~68~~	~~1~~
LTU	Ričardas Berankis	100	2
UKR	Sergiy Stakhovsky	115	3
CAN	Brayden Schnur	116	4
SVK	Lukáš Lacko	125	5
TPE	Jason Jung	134	6
CYP	Marcos Baghdatis	137	7
RUS	Evgeny Donskoy	138	8
AUS	Alex Bolt	140	9
IND	Ramkumar Ramanathan	151	10
KOR	Kwon Soon-woo	152	11
JPN	Tatsuma Ito	153	12
SRB	Nikola Milojević	156	13
BEL	Ruben Bemelmans	166	14
JPN	Hiroki Moriya	184	15
JPN	Yūichi Sugita	185	16

- ^{1} Rankings as of 22 April 2019.

=== Other entrants ===
The following players received wildcards into the singles main draw:

- (South Korea) Chung Hong
- (South Korea) Hong Seong-chan
- (South Korea) Kim Dong-ju
- (South Korea) Lee Jea-moon
- (South Korea) Shin San-hui

The following players received entry into the singles main draw using their ITF World Tennis Ranking:

- (China) Bai Yan
- (Tunisia) Moez Echargui
- (Egypt) Youssef Hossam
- (Japan) Shintaro Imai
- (Japan) Rio Noguchi

The following player received entry into the singles main draw as an alternate:

- (India) Sriram Balaji

The following players received entry from the qualifying draw:

- (Australia) Jacob Grills
- (South Korea) Nam Ji-sung

The following player received entry as a lucky loser:

- (China) Xia Zihao

== Champions ==
=== Singles ===
- (South Korea) Kwon Soon-woo def. (Australia) Max Purcell 7–5, 7–5.

=== Doubles ===
- (Australia) Max Purcell / (Australia) Luke Saville def. (Belgium) Ruben Bemelmans / (Ukraine) Sergiy Stakhovsky 6–4, 7–6^{(9–7)}.
