= 2025 Seoul Open Challenger – Doubles =

Doubles
- 2025 Seoul Open Challenger

Final
- Champions: (United States) Nathaniel Lammons (Netherlands) Jean-Julien Rojer
- Runners-up: (United States) George Goldhoff (United States) Theodore Winegar
- Score: 6–3, 6–4

Events
Singles	Doubles
- Seoul Open Challenger

Saketh Myneni and Ramkumar Ramanathan were the defending champions but only Ramanathan chose to defend his title, partnering Thijmen Loof. They lost in the first round to Blake Bayldon and Mats Hermans.

Nathaniel Lammons and Jean-Julien Rojer won the title after defeating George Goldhoff and Theodore Winegar 6–3, 6–4 in the final.

== Seeds ==
1. (Chinese Taipei) Ray Ho / (Australia) Matthew Romios (semifinals)
2. (New Zealand) Finn Reynolds / (New Zealand) James Watt (semifinals)
3. (Austria) Neil Oberleitner / (Czech Republic) Michael Vrbenský (first round)
4. (South Korea) Nam Ji-sung / (Japan) Takeru Yuzuki (first round)

== Draw ==
Key

- Q = Qualifier
- WC = Wild card
- LL = Lucky loser
- Alt = Alternate
- ITF = ITF entry
- PR = Protected ranking
- SR = Special ranking
- SE = Special exempt
- JE = Junior exempt
- JR = Junior Accelerator Programme entrant
- CO = College Accelerator Programme entrant
- NG = Next Gen Accelerator Program entrant
- w/o = Walkover
- r = Retired
- d = Defaulted

=== Draw ===
First round
1	(Chinese Taipei) R Ho (Australia) MC Romios	7^{7}	1	[10]
(Switzerland) M-A Hüsler (Netherlands) M Veldheer	6^{4}	6	[6]
(Chinese Taipei) Y-h Hsu (Chinese Taipei) T-h Huang	6	4	[3]
(Japan) Y Shimizu (Japan) K Uchida	3	6	[10]
3	(Austria) N Oberleitner (Czech Republic) M Vrbenský	3	6^{5}
(United States) G Goldhoff (United States) T Winegar	6	7^{7}
(Netherlands) T Loof (India) R Ramanathan	5	4
(Australia) B Bayldon (Netherlands) M Hermans	7	6
(Japan) R Noguchi (China) A Wang	6	0	[5]
(Japan) K Uesugi (Japan) S Watanabe	3	6	[10]
(United States) N Lammons (Netherlands) J-J Rojer	6	7^{7}
4	(South Korea) J-s Nam (Japan) T Yuzuki	3	6^{2}
WC	(South Korea) Y-s Chung (South Korea) U-s Park	5	6	[5]
WC	(South Korea) Ann Suk (South Korea) Kim Dong-ju	7	4	[10]
(Thailand) P Isaro (India) N Kaliyanda Poonacha	5	3
2	(New Zealand) F Reynolds (New Zealand) J Watt	7	6

Quarterfinals
1	(Chinese Taipei) R Ho (Australia) MC Romios	6	6
(Japan) Y Shimizu (Japan) K Uchida	1	2
(United States) G Goldhoff (United States) T Winegar	7^{7}	6
(Australia) B Bayldon (Netherlands) M Hermans	6^{5}	3
(Japan) K Uesugi (Japan) S Watanabe	6	4	[4]
(United States) N Lammons (Netherlands) J-J Rojer	3	6	[10]
WC	(South Korea) S Ann (South Korea) D-j Kim	2	6	[4]
2	(New Zealand) F Reynolds (New Zealand) J Watt	6	4	[10]

Semifinals
1	(Chinese Taipei) R Ho (Australia) MC Romios	3	6^{4}
(United States) G Goldhoff (United States) T Winegar	6	7^{7}
(United States) N Lammons (Netherlands) J-J Rojer	6	7^{7}
2	(New Zealand) F Reynolds (New Zealand) J Watt	1	6^{5}

Final
(United States) G Goldhoff (United States) T Winegar	3	4
(United States) N Lammons (Netherlands) J-J Rojer	6	6
