= 2014 Seoul Open Women's Challenger – Singles =

Singles
- 2014 Seoul Open Women's Challenger

Final
- Champion: (Japan) Misaki Doi
- Runner-up: (Japan) Misa Eguchi
- Score: 6–1, 7–6^{(7–3)}

Events
Singles	Doubles
← 2013 ·	Seoul Open Women's Challenger	· 2015 →

The Seoul Open Women's Challenger was a new addition to the ITF Women's Circuit.

Misaki Doi won the inaugural tournament, defeating Misa Eguchi in the final, 6–1, 7–6^{(7–3)}.

== Seeds ==
1. (Japan) Kimiko Date-Krumm (second round; retired)
2. (Japan) Misaki Doi (champion)
3. (Japan) Ayumi Morita (first round; retired)
4. (Hungary) Tímea Babos (second round)
5. (Chinese Taipei) Hsieh Su-wei (second round)
6. (Belgium) An-Sophie Mestach (semifinals)
7. (Czech Republic) Kristýna Plíšková (semifinals)
8. (Japan) Risa Ozaki (quarterfinals)

== Main draw ==
=== Key ===
- Q = Qualifier
- WC = Wild card
- LL = Lucky loser
- Alt = Alternate
- SE = Special exempt
- PR = Protected ranking
- ITF = ITF entry
- JE = Junior exempt
- w/o = Walkover
- r = Retired
- d = Defaulted
- SR = Special ranking

=== Finals ===
Semifinals
7	(Czech Republic) Kristýna Plíšková	2	2
(Japan) Misa Eguchi	6	6
6	(Belgium) An-Sophie Mestach	6^{1}	0
2	(Japan) Misaki Doi	7^{7}	6

Final
(Japan) Misa Eguchi	1	6^{3}
2	(Japan) Misaki Doi	6	7_{7}

=== Top half ===
First round
1	(Japan) K Date-Krumm	6	6
PR	(Uzbekistan) A Amanmuradova	4	3
(Japan) M Imanishi	6	6
PR	(Russia) K Lykina	1	4
(South Africa) C Simmonds	3	0
(China) Y Duan	6	6
(Ukraine) O Savchuk	6^{2}	6	1
7	(Czech Republic) Kr Plíšková	7^{7}	4	6
3	(Japan) A Morita	4^{r}
(Australia) Ar Rodionova	5
WC	(South Korea) Y-r Lee	1	3
(Japan) E Sema	6	6
(Japan) M Eguchi	6	6
(Thailand) N Lertcheewakarn	2	0
WC	(South Korea) J-h Choi	2	4
5	(Chinese Taipei) S-w Hsieh	6	6

Second round
1	(Japan) K Date-Krumm	6^{r}
(Japan) M Imanishi	6
(China) Y Duan	4	2
7	(Czech Republic) Kr Plíšková	6	6
(Australia) Ar Rodionova	1	4
(Japan) E Sema	6	6
(Japan) M Eguchi	6	6
5	(Chinese Taipei) S-w Hsieh	4	3

Quarterfinals
(Japan) M Imanishi	4	3
7	(Czech Republic) Kr Plíšková	6	6
(Japan) E Sema	5	3
(Japan) M Eguchi	7	6

Semifinals
7	(Czech Republic) Kr Plíšková	2	2
(Japan) M Eguchi	6	6

=== Bottom half ===
First round
6	(Belgium) A-S Mestach	6	6
(South Korea) S-j Jang	1	4
Q	(Japan) S Akita	6	3	6
Q	(Chinese Taipei) C-w Chan	3	6	2
(Australia) S Sanders	6	6
Q	(Japan) M Miyamura	2	2
WC	(South Korea) S-r Lee	1	1
4	(Hungary) T Babos	6	6
8	(Japan) R Ozaki	6	6
WC	(South Korea) S-y Choi	2	3
PR	(Australia) J Gajdošová	7	6
Q	(South Korea) H-h Hong	5	3
(United Kingdom) S Murray	4	3
JE	(Serbia) I Jorović	6	6
(France) I Pavlovic	2	0
2	(Japan) M Doi	6	6

Second round
6	(Belgium) A-S Mestach	6	6
Q	(Japan) S Akita	1	1
(Australia) S Sanders	6^{6}	6	6
4	(Hungary) T Babos	7^{8}	3	4
8	(Japan) R Ozaki	7	6
PR	(Australia) J Gajdošová	5	4
JE	(Serbia) I Jorović	7	4	2
2	(Japan) M Doi	5	6	6

Quarterfinals
6	(Belgium) A-S Mestach	6^{2}	7	6
(Australia) S Sanders	7^{7}	5	2
8	(Japan) R Ozaki	3	3
2	(Japan) M Doi	6	6

Semifinals
6	(Belgium) A-S Mestach	6^{1}	0
2	(Japan) M Doi	7^{7}	6
