= 2016 Lecoq Seoul Open =

- Date: 9–15 May
- Edition: 2nd
- Prize money: $100,000
- Surface: Hard
- Location: Seoul, South Korea

Champions

Singles
- (Ukraine) Sergiy Stakhovsky

Doubles
- (Australia) Matt Reid / (Australia) John-Patrick Smith
← 2015 ·	Lecoq Seoul Open	· 2017 →

The 2016 Lecoq Seoul Open was a professional tennis tournament played on outdoor hard courts. It was the second edition of the tournament. It was part of the 2016 ATP Challenger Tour, offering a total of $100,000 in prize money. It took place in Seoul, South Korea, on 9–15 May 2016.

== Men's singles main draw entrants ==
=== Seeds ===
Country	Player	Rank^{1}	Seed
AUS	John Millman	67	1
~~KOR~~	~~Chung Hyeon~~	~~82~~	~~2~~
AUS	Sam Groth	95	3
GBR	Daniel Evans	97	4
TPE	Lu Yen-hsun	102	5
JPN	Tatsuma Ito	106	6
JPN	Yūichi Sugita	111	7
SVK	Lukáš Lacko	112	8

- ^{1} Rankings as of 2 May 2016.

=== Other entrants ===
The following players received wildcards into the singles main draw:

- (South Korea) Hong Seong-chan
- (South Korea) Kang Ho-gi
- (South Korea) Kwon Soon-woo
- (South Korea) Nam Ji-sung

The following players received entry from the qualifying draw:

- (United Kingdom) Liam Broady
- (Japan) Yuya Kibi
- (Denmark) Frederik Nielsen
- (United Kingdom) Alexander Ward

The following player entered as a lucky loser:

- (Japan) Shuichi Sekiguchi

== Champions ==
=== Singles ===
- (Ukraine) Sergiy Stakhovsky def. (Chinese Taipei) Lu Yen-hsun, 4–6, 6–3, 7–6^{(9–7)}

=== Doubles ===
- (Australia) Matt Reid / (Australia) John-Patrick Smith def. (China) Gong Maoxin / (Chinese Taipei) Yi Chu-huan, 6–3, 7–5
