= 2025 Seoul Open Challenger =

- Date: 27 October – 2 November
- Edition: 9th
- Surface: Hard
- Location: Seoul, South Korea

Champions

Singles
- (Japan) Sho Shimabukuro

Doubles
- (United States) Nathaniel Lammons / (Netherlands) Jean-Julien Rojer
- Seoul Open Challenger

The 2025 Eugene Seoul Open Challenger was a professional tennis tournament played on outdoor hard courts. It was the ninth edition of the tournament. It was part of the 2025 ATP Challenger Tour. It took place in Seoul, South Korea, between 27 October and 2 November 2025.

== Singles main draw entrants ==
=== Seeds ===
Country	Player	Rank^{1}	Seed
AUS	James Duckworth	108	1
CHN	Bu Yunchaokete	115	2
JPN	Yoshihito Nishioka	152	3
AUT	Jurij Rodionov	154	4
HKG	Coleman Wong	156	5
POR	Henrique Rocha	161	6
JPN	Yosuke Watanuki	167	7
JPN	Taro Daniel	179	8

- ^{1} Rankings as of 20 October 2025.

=== Other entrants ===
The following players received wildcards into the singles main draw:

- (South Korea) Chung Hyeon
- (South Korea) Shin San-hui
- (South Korea) Shin Woo-bin

The following players received entry from the qualifying draw:

- (Japan) Masamichi Imamura
- (Japan) Kokoro Isomura
- (Japan) Yuki Mochizuki
- (South Korea) Park Ui-sung
- (Thailand) Kasidit Samrej
- (Australia) Philip Sekulic

== Champions ==
=== Singles ===
- (Japan) Sho Shimabukuro def. (Hong Kong) Coleman Wong 6–4, 6–3.

=== Doubles ===
- (United States) Nathaniel Lammons / (Netherlands) Jean-Julien Rojer def. (United States) George Goldhoff / (United States) Theodore Winegar 6–3, 6–4.
