= 2026 Seoul Open Challenger – Singles =

Singles
- 2026 Seoul Open Challenger

Final
- Champion: (France) Térence Atmane
- Runner-up: (Hong Kong) Coleman Wong
- Score: 7–6^{(7–3)}, 3–6, 7–6^{(11–9)}

Events
Singles	Doubles
- Seoul Open Challenger

Sho Shimabukuro was the defending champion but lost in the quarterfinals to Coleman Wong.

Térence Atmane won the title after defeating Wong 7–6^{(7–3)}, 3–6, 7–6^{(11–9)} in the final.

== Seeds ==
1. (Croatia) Marin Čilić (first round)
2. (China) Bu Yunchaokete (second round)
3. (Hong Kong) Coleman Wong (final)
4. (France) Térence Atmane (champion)
5. (South Africa) Lloyd Harris (second round)
6. (China) Wu Yibing (first round)
7. (Japan) Sho Shimabukuro (quarterfinals)
8. (Australia) Aleksandar Vukic (second round)

== Draw ==
Key

- Q = Qualifier
- WC = Wild card
- LL = Lucky loser
- Alt = Alternate
- ITF = ITF entry
- PR = Protected ranking
- SR = Special ranking
- SE = Special exempt
- JE = Junior exempt
- JR = Junior Accelerator Programme entrant
- CO = College Accelerator Programme entrant
- NG = Next Gen Accelerator Program entrant
- w/o = Walkover
- r = Retired
- d = Defaulted

=== Finals ===
Semifinals
(United Kingdom) Billy Harris	3	1
4	(France) Térence Atmane	6	6
3	(Hong Kong) Coleman Wong	6	7
Q	(Australia) Omar Jasika	2	5

Final
4	(France) Térence Atmane	7^{7}	3	7^{11}
3	(Hong Kong) Coleman Wong	6^{3}	6	6^{9}

=== Top half ===
First round
1	(Croatia) M Čilić	6^{3}	6	3
(China) Z Zhang	7^{7}	2	6
(Japan) R Sakamoto	6	6
(Thailand) K Samrej	3	4
WC	(South Korea) Kim Jang-jun	6^{2}	2
(United Kingdom) B Harris	7^{7}	6
Q	(United States) Christian Langmo	2	1
8	(Australia) A Vukic	6	6
4	(France) T Atmane	4	6	6
LL	(Japan) Koki Matsuda	6	1	2
(Japan) T Daniel	6	6
(United States) Andre Ilagan	3	1
Q	A Kachmazov	6	6
(Japan) R Noguchi	3	1
WC	(South Korea) S-c Hong	7	6
6	(China) Y Wu	5	1

Second round
(China) Z Zhang	0	4
(Japan) R Sakamoto	6	6
(United Kingdom) B Harris	6	6
8	(Australia) A Vukic	2	4
4	(France) T Atmane	7	6
(Japan) T Daniel	5	4
Q	A Kachmazov	7^{7}	3	1
WC	(South Korea) S-c Hong	6^{4}	6	6

Quarterfinals
(Japan) R Sakamoto	0^{r}
(United Kingdom) B Harris	3
4	(France) T Atmane	6	6
WC	(South Korea) S-c Hong	2	3

Semifinals
(United Kingdom) B Harris	3	1
4	(France) T Atmane	6	6

=== Bottom half ===
First round
7	(Japan) S Shimabukuro	6	6
(Czech Republic) J Kumstát	4	0
(Denmark) A Holmgren	3	3
(Japan) J Friend	6	6
(Greece) S Sakellaridis	6	6
(Kazakhstan) T Skatov	2	2
LL	(South Korea) Shin San-hui	4	4
3	(Hong Kong) C Wong	6	6
5	(South Africa) L Harris	6	6
(China) J Shang	4	3
Q	(Australia) O Jasika	6	2
(France) A Müller	4	0^{r}
Q	(Japan) Shintaro Imai	4	3
Q	(South Korea) Y-s Chung	6	6
WC	(South Korea) Cho Min-hyuk	1	0
2	(China) Y Bu	6	6

Second round
7	(Japan) S Shimabukuro	6	6
(Japan) J Friend	3	1
(Greece) S Sakellaridis	1	3
3	(Hong Kong) C Wong	6	6
5	(South Africa) L Harris	3	1
Q	(Australia) O Jasika	6	6
Q	(South Korea) Y-s Chung	7	6
2	(China) Y Bu	5	4

Quarterfinals
7	(Japan) S Shimabukuro	6^{4}	1
3	(Hong Kong) C Wong	7^{7}	6
Q	(Australia) O Jasika	6	3	6
Q	(South Korea) Y-s Chung	3	6	2

Semifinals
3	(Hong Kong) C Wong	6	7
Q	(Australia) O Jasika	2	5
