= 2017 Davis Cup Asia/Oceania Zone Group I =

International tennis competition

The Asia/Oceania Zone was one of the three zones of the regional Davis Cup competition in 2017.

In the Asia/Oceania Zone there were four different tiers, called groups, in which teams competed against each other to advance to the upper tier. Winners in Group I advanced to the World Group play-offs, along with losing teams from the World Group first round. Teams who lost their respective ties competed in the relegation play-offs, with winning teams remaining in Group I, whereas teams who lost their play-offs were relegated to the Asia/Oceania Zone Group II in 2018.

== Participating nations ==
Seeds: The first seed received a bye into the second round.

1. Kazakhstan
2. India

Remaining nations:

- China
- Chinese Taipei
- New Zealand
- South Korea
- Uzbekistan

=== Draw ===
Second Round Play-offs
Yanggu, South Korea (hard)
Chinese Taipei	2
South Korea	3

First Round Play-offs
bye
Chinese Taipei
Auckland, New Zealand (hard)
South Korea	2
New Zealand	3

First Round
1	Kazakhstan
bye
Kaohsiung, Taiwan (hard)
Chinese Taipei	0
China	5
Gimcheon, South Korea (indoor hard)
Uzbekistan	3
South Korea	1
Pune, India (hard)
New Zealand	1
2	India	4

Second Round
Astana, Kazakhstan (indoor clay)
1	Kazakhstan	4
China	1
Bangalore, India (hard)
Uzbekistan	1
2	India	4

- Chinese Taipei relegated to Group II in 2018.
- Kazakhstan and India advance to World Group Play-off.

== First round ==
=== Chinese Taipei vs. China ===
Chinese Taipei
0
Yangming Tennis Center, Kaohsiung, Taiwan
17–19 February 2017
Hard

China
5

			1	2	3	4	5
1	(Chinese Taipei) (China)	Chen Ti; Li Zhe	7; 5	5; 7	2; 6	7^{7} 6^{5}	5; 7
2	(Chinese Taipei) (China)	Jason Jung; Wu Yibing	1; 6	6; 4	7; 5	6^{9} 7^{11}	1; 4	retired
3	(Chinese Taipei) (China)	Jason Jung / Peng Hsien-yin; Wu Di / Zhang Zhizhen	6^{4} 7^{7}	4; 6	3; 6
4	(Chinese Taipei) (China)	Lee Kuan-yi; Li Zhe	7; 5	2; 6	6^{3} 7^{7}
5	(Chinese Taipei) (China)	Peng Hsien-yin; Zhang Zhizhen	2; 6	6; 3	6^{4} 7^{7}

=== South Korea vs. Uzbekistan ===
South Korea
1
Gimcheon Sports Town Tennis Courts, Gimcheon, South Korea
3–5 February 2017
Hard (i)

Uzbekistan
3

			1	2	3	4	5
1	(South Korea) (Uzbekistan)	Chung Hyeon; Sanjar Fayziev	6; 4	6; 4	6^{5} 7^{7}	4; 6	6; 0
2	(South Korea) (Uzbekistan)	Lee Duck-hee; Denis Istomin	6; 4	2; 6	6^{0} 7^{7}	4; 6
3	(South Korea) (Uzbekistan)	Chung Hyeon / Lim Yong-kyu; Sanjar Fayziev / Denis Istomin	3; 6	7^{12} 6^{10}	7^{7} 6^{5}	5; 7	4; 6
4	(South Korea) (Uzbekistan)	Kwon Soon-woo; Denis Istomin	6; 3	6^{5} 7^{7}	2; 6	6^{12} 7^{14}
5	(South Korea) (Uzbekistan)	Lee Duck-hee; Sanjar Fayziev						not played

=== India vs. New Zealand ===
India
4
Balewadi Sports Complex, Pune, India
3–5 February 2017
Hard

New Zealand
1

			1	2	3	4	5
1	(India) (New Zealand)	Yuki Bhambri; Finn Tearney	6; 4	6; 4	6; 3
2	(India) (New Zealand)	Ramkumar Ramanathan; Jose Statham	6; 3	6; 4	6; 3
3	(India) (New Zealand)	Leander Paes / Vishnu Vardhan; Artem Sitak / Michael Venus	6; 4	4; 6	4; 6	3; 6
4	(India) (New Zealand)	Ramkumar Ramanathan; Finn Tearney	7; 5	6; 1	6; 0
5	(India) (New Zealand)	Yuki Bhambri; Jose Statham	7; 5	3; 6	6; 4

== Second round ==
=== Kazakhstan vs. China ===
Kazakhstan
4
Daulet National Tennis Centre, Astana, Kazakhstan
7–9 April
Clay (i)

China
1

			1	2	3	4	5
1	(Kazakhstan) (China)	Mikhail Kukushkin; Wu Di	6; 2	3; 6	6; 3	6; 2
2	(Kazakhstan) (China)	Dmitry Popko; Zhang Ze	6; 3	6; 4	7; 5
3	(Kazakhstan) (China)	Andrey Golubev / Aleksandr Nedovyesov; Bai Yan / Gong Maoxin	3; 6	6; 1	5; 7	6; 1	6; 3
4	(Kazakhstan) (China)	Aleksandr Nedovyesov; Zhang Ze	6; 3	4; 6	1; 6
5	(Kazakhstan) (China)	Dmitry Popko; Wu Di	6^{3} 7^{7}	7; 5	7^{7} 6^{1}

=== India vs. Uzbekistan ===
India
4
KSLTA Tennis Stadium, Bangalore, India
7–9 April
Hard

Uzbekistan
1

			1	2	3	4	5
1	(India) (Uzbekistan)	Ramkumar Ramanathan; Temur Ismailov	6; 2	5; 7	6; 2	7; 5
2	(India) (Uzbekistan)	Prajnesh Gunneswaran; Sanjar Fayziev	7; 5	3; 6	6; 3	6; 4
3	(India) (Uzbekistan)	Sriram Balaji / Rohan Bopanna; Farrukh Dustov / Sanjar Fayziev	6; 2	6; 4	6; 1
4	(India) (Uzbekistan)	Ramkumar Ramanathan; Sanjar Fayziev	6; 3	6; 2
5	(India) (Uzbekistan)	Prajnesh Gunneswaran; Temur Ismailov	5; 7	3; 6

== 1st round relegation play-offs ==
=== New Zealand vs. South Korea ===
New Zealand
3
ASB Tennis Centre, Auckland, New Zealand
7–9 April
Hard

South Korea
2

			1	2	3	4	5
1	(New Zealand) (South Korea)	Jose Statham; Hong Seong-chan	3; 6	5; 7	7^{8} 6^{6}	7^{8} 6^{6}	2; 0	retired
2	(New Zealand) (South Korea)	Michael Venus; Kwon Soon-woo	2; 6	2; 6	6^{1} 7^{7}
3	(New Zealand) (South Korea)	Marcus Daniell / Artem Sitak; Chung Hong / Lee Jea-moon	6; 2	4; 6	6; 4	7^{7} 6^{4}
4	(New Zealand) (South Korea)	Jose Statham; Kwon Soon-woo	3; 6	2; 6	4; 6
5	(New Zealand) (South Korea)	Michael Venus; Hong Seong-chan	6; 3	3; 6	4; 6	6; 2	6; 3

== 2nd round relegation play-offs ==
=== South Korea vs. Chinese Taipei ===
South Korea
3
Yanggu Tennis Park, Yanggu, South Korea
15−17 September
Hard

Chinese Taipei
2

			1	2	3	4	5
1	(South Korea) (Chinese Taipei)	Chung Hyeon; Wu Tung-lin	7^{7} 6^{3}	6; 1	6; 1
2	(South Korea) (Chinese Taipei)	Kwon Soon-woo; Jason Jung	6; 3	6; 4	2; 6	7^{7} 6^{4}
3	(South Korea) (Chinese Taipei)	Lee Jea-moon / Lim Yong-kyu; Jason Jung / Chen Ti	4; 6	4; 6	4; 6
4	(South Korea) (Chinese Taipei)	Chung Hyeon; Yu Cheng-yu	6; 4	6; 2	6; 1
5	(South Korea) (Chinese Taipei)	Lee Jea-moon; Wu Tung-lin	2; 6	7; 5	4; 6
