= 2026 Gwangju Open =

- Date: 20–26 April
- Edition: 9th
- Surface: Hard
- Location: Gwangju, South Korea

Champions

Singles
- (South Korea) Kwon Soon-woo

Doubles
- (United States) Mac Kiger / (United States) Reese Stalder
- Gwangju Open

The 2026 Gwangju Open was a professional tennis tournament played on hardcourts. It was the 9th edition of the tournament which was part of the 2026 ATP Challenger Tour. It took place in Gwangju, South Korea between 20 and 26 April 2026.

== Singles main-draw entrants ==
=== Seeds ===
Country	Player	Rank^{1}	Seed
JPN	Sho Shimabukuro	110	1
AUS	Tristan Schoolkate	115	2
HKG	Coleman Wong	121	3
AUS	Dane Sweeny	132	4
AUS	Alex Bolt	154	5
EST	Mark Lajal	165	6
SUI	Leandro Riedi	169	7
CHN	Bu Yunchaokete	175	8

- ^{1} Rankings as of 13 April 2026.

=== Other entrants ===
The following players received wildcards into the singles main draw:

- (South Korea) Chung Hyeon
- (South Korea) Kwon Soon-woo
- (South Korea) Park Ui-sung

The following player received entry into the singles main draw using a protected ranking:

- (Chinese Taipei) Jason Jung

The following player received entry into the singles main draw as an alternate:

- (Thailand) Maximus Jones

The following players received entry from the qualifying draw:

- (Germany) Daniel Masur
- (Japan) Hayato Matsuoka
- Marat Sharipov
- (Japan) Yuta Shimizu
- (Chinese Taipei) Wu Tung-lin
- (Kazakhstan) Beibit Zhukayev

== Champions ==
=== Singles ===
- (South Korea) Kwon Soon-woo def. (Denmark) August Holmgren 6–4, 7–5.

=== Doubles ===
- (United States) Mac Kiger / (United States) Reese Stalder def. (India) Anirudh Chandrasekar / (Japan) Takeru Yuzuki 6–4, 6–7^{(7–9)}, [10–8].
