= 2026 Gwangju Open – Singles =

Singles
- 2026 Gwangju Open

Final
- Champion: (South Korea) Kwon Soon-woo
- Runner-up: (Denmark) August Holmgren
- Score: 6–4, 7–5

Events
Singles	Doubles
- Gwangju Open

Jason Kubler was the defending champion but chose not to defend his title.

Kwon Soon-woo won the title after defeating August Holmgren 6–4, 7–5 in the final.

== Seeds ==
1. (Japan) Sho Shimabukuro (second round)
2. (Australia) Tristan Schoolkate (quarterfinals)
3. (Hong Kong) Coleman Wong (first round)
4. (Australia) Dane Sweeny (second round)
5. (Australia) Alex Bolt (first round)
6. (Estonia) Mark Lajal (second round)
7. (Switzerland) Leandro Riedi (semifinals, retired)
8. (China) Bu Yunchaokete (first round)

== Draw ==
Key

- Q = Qualifier
- WC = Wild card
- LL = Lucky loser
- Alt = Alternate
- ITF = ITF entry
- PR = Protected ranking
- SR = Special ranking
- SE = Special exempt
- JE = Junior exempt
- JR = Junior Accelerator Programme entrant
- CO = College Accelerator Programme entrant
- NG = Next Gen Accelerator Program entrant
- w/o = Walkover
- r = Retired
- d = Defaulted

=== Finals ===
Semifinals
(Denmark) August Holmgren	4
7	(Switzerland) Leandro Riedi	3^{r}
WC	(South Korea) Kwon Soon-woo	6	6
(Chinese Taipei) Hsu Yu-hsiou	4	4

Final
(Denmark) August Holmgren	4	5
WC	(South Korea) Kwon Soon-woo	6	7

=== Top half ===
First round
1	(Japan) S Shimabukuro	7^{7}	6
WC	(South Korea) U-s Park	6^{4}	1
Q	(Japan) Y Shimizu	6^{2}	7	0
(Japan) Y Uchiyama	7^{7}	5	0^{r}
(Japan) R Noguchi	4	2
(Canada) A Galarneau	6	6
(Denmark) A Holmgren	6	6
8	(China) Y Bu	4	4
4	(Australia) D Sweeny	6	1	6
Q	(Chinese Taipei) T-l Wu	3	6	1
(Australia) J McCabe	6	7
(Japan) K Uchida	4	5
P Kotov	6	2	3
(Kazakhstan) M Kukushkin	1	6	6
Q	M Sharipov	6	4	5
7	(Switzerland) L Riedi	3	6	7

Second round
1	(Japan) S Shimabukuro	6	6^{6}	4
Q	(Japan) Y Shimizu	0	7^{8}	6
(Canada) A Galarneau	4	3
(Denmark) A Holmgren	6	6
4	(Australia) D Sweeny	7^{8}	1	6^{8}
(Australia) J McCabe	6^{6}	6	7^{10}
(Kazakhstan) M Kukushkin	3	2
7	(Switzerland) L Riedi	6	6

Quarterfinals
Q	(Japan) Y Shimizu	6^{6}	4
(Denmark) A Holmgren	7^{8}	6
(Australia) J McCabe	1	4
7	(Switzerland) L Riedi	6	6

Semifinals
(Denmark) A Holmgren	4
7	(Switzerland) L Riedi	3^{r}

=== Bottom half ===
First round
5	(Australia) A Bolt	6^{5}	6	1
I Simakin	7^{7}	3	6
Q	(Germany) D Masur	2	6^{5}
WC	(South Korea) S-w Kwon	6	7^{7}
PR	(Chinese Taipei) J Jung	3	4
WC	(South Korea) H Chung	6	6
(France) C Chidekh	3	6	6
3	(Hong Kong) C Wong	6	2	1
6	(Estonia) M Lajal	7	5	7^{8}
Alt	(Thailand) M Jones	5	7	6^{6}
(Chinese Taipei) Y-h Hsu	6	4
(United States) M Cassone	3	3^{r}
(United Kingdom) L Broady	6	6
Q	(Kazakhstan) B Zhukayev	2	1
Q	(Japan) H Matsuoka	0	4
2	(Australia) T Schoolkate	6	6

Second round
I Simakin	6^{1}	3
WC	(South Korea) S-w Kwon	7^{7}	6
WC	(South Korea) H Chung	7	7
(France) C Chidekh	5	5
6	(Estonia) M Lajal	6^{10}	7^{7}	3
(Chinese Taipei) Y-h Hsu	7^{12}	6^{3}	6
(United Kingdom) L Broady	7^{8}	3	2
2	(Australia) T Schoolkate	6^{6}	6	6

Quarterfinals
WC	(South Korea) S-w Kwon	3	6	6
WC	(South Korea) H Chung	6	2	4
(Chinese Taipei) Y-h Hsu	7^{11}	6
2	(Australia) T Schoolkate	6^{9}	4

Semifinals
WC	(South Korea) S-w Kwon	6	6
(Chinese Taipei) Y-h Hsu	4	4
