= 2014 Seoul Open Women's Challenger – Doubles =

Doubles
- 2014 Seoul Open Women's Challenger

Final
- Champions: (Chinese Taipei) Chan Chin-wei (Chinese Taipei) Chuang Chia-jung
- Runners-up: (France) Irena Pavlovic (Czech Republic) Kristýna Plíšková
- Score: 6–4, 6–3

Events
Singles	Doubles
← 2013 ·	Seoul Open Women's Challenger	· 2015 →

The Seoul Open Women's Challenger was a new addition to the ITF Women's Circuit.

Chan Chin-wei and Chuang Chia-jung won the inaugural tournament, defeating Irena Pavlovic and Kristýna Plíšková in the final, 6–4, 6–3.

== Seeds ==
1. (Thailand) Nicha Lertpitaksinchai / (Thailand) Peangtarn Plipuech (first round)
2. (United Kingdom) Samantha Murray / (United Kingdom) Jade Windley (first round)
3. (Japan) Misa Eguchi / (Japan) Erika Sema (first round)
4. (Chinese Taipei) Hsieh Shu-ying / (Australia) Arina Rodionova (quarterfinals)

== Draw ==
=== Key ===
- Q = Qualifier
- WC = Wild card
- LL = Lucky loser
- Alt = Alternate
- SE = Special exempt
- PR = Protected ranking
- ITF = ITF entry
- JE = Junior exempt
- w/o = Walkover
- r = Retired
- d = Defaulted
- SR = Special ranking

First round
1	(Thailand) N Lertpitaksinchai (Thailand) Pe Plipuech	5	6	[4]
(Australia) J Gajdošová (Australia) S Sanders	7	4	[10]
(Bolivia) MF Álvarez Terán (New Zealand) A Guthrie	2	7	[12]
(South Korea) N-l Han (South Korea) M Yoo	6	5	[10]
3	(Japan) M Eguchi (Japan) E Sema	6	3	[9]
(Australia) A Bai (Australia) J Moore	4	6	[11]
(France) I Pavlovic (Czech Republic) Kr Plíšková	6	6
WC	(South Korea) Y-j Ahn (South Korea) S Choi	2	0
(Uzbekistan) A Amanmuradova (Ukraine) O Savchuk	3	3
(Chinese Taipei) C-w Chan (Chinese Taipei) C-j Chuang	6	6
(South Africa) C Simmonds (Russia) E Yashina	3	4
4	(Chinese Taipei) S-y Hsieh (Australia) Ar Rodionova	6	6
WC	(South Korea) H-h Hong (South Korea) Y-r Lee	3	3
(United Kingdom) J Rae (United Kingdom) A Smith	6	6
WC	(South Korea) S-j Jang (South Korea) S-r Lee	6^{5}	6	[13]
2	(United Kingdom) S Murray (United Kingdom) J Windley	7^{7}	4	[11]

Quarterfinals
(Australia) J Gajdošová (Australia) S Sanders	6	6
(Bolivia) MF Álvarez Terán (New Zealand) A Guthrie	1	2
(Australia) A Bai (Australia) J Moore	3	4
(France) I Pavlovic (Czech Republic) Kr Plíšková	6	6
(Chinese Taipei) C-w Chan (Chinese Taipei) C-j Chuang	6	4	[10]
4	(Chinese Taipei) S-y Hsieh (Australia) Ar Rodionova	3	6	[6]
(United Kingdom) J Rae (United Kingdom) A Smith	6	6
WC	(South Korea) S-j Jang (South Korea) S-r Lee	3	3

Semifinals
(Australia) J Gajdošová (Australia) S Sanders
(France) I Pavlovic (Czech Republic) Kr Plíšková	w/o
(Chinese Taipei) C-w Chan (Chinese Taipei) C-j Chuang	7^{7}	7
(United Kingdom) J Rae (United Kingdom) A Smith	6^{2}	5

Final
(France) I Pavlovic (Czech Republic) Kr Plíšková	4	3
(Chinese Taipei) C-w Chan (Chinese Taipei) C-j Chuang	6	6
