= 2026 Gwangju Open – Doubles =

Doubles
- 2026 Gwangju Open

Final
- Champions: (United States) Mac Kiger (United States) Reese Stalder
- Runners-up: (India) Anirudh Chandrasekar (Japan) Takeru Yuzuki
- Score: 6–4, 6–7^{(7–9)}, [10–8]

Events
Singles	Doubles
- Gwangju Open

Ray Ho and Matthew Romios were the defending champions but chose not to defend their title.

Mac Kiger and Reese Stalder won the title after defeating Anirudh Chandrasekar and Takeru Yuzuki 6–4, 6–7^{(7–9)}, [10–8] in the final.

== Seeds ==
1. (United States) Mac Kiger / (United States) Reese Stalder (champions)
2. (India) Anirudh Chandrasekar / (Japan) Takeru Yuzuki (final)
3. (Netherlands) Jean-Julien Rojer / (United States) Theodore Winegar (semifinals)
4. (Thailand) Pruchya Isaro / (India) Niki Kaliyanda Poonacha (semifinals)

== Draw ==
Key

- Q = Qualifier
- WC = Wild card
- LL = Lucky loser
- Alt = Alternate
- ITF = ITF entry
- PR = Protected ranking
- SR = Special ranking
- SE = Special exempt
- JE = Junior exempt
- JR = Junior Accelerator Programme entrant
- CO = College Accelerator Programme entrant
- NG = Next Gen Accelerator Program entrant
- w/o = Walkover
- r = Retired
- d = Defaulted

First round
1	(United States) M Kiger (United States) R Stalder	6	7^{7}
WC	(South Korea) Ann Suk (South Korea) Kim Geun-jun	4	6^{2}
(Australia) Ethan Cook (Australia) K Pearson	7^{7}	3	[5]
(Germany) D Masur (India) R Ramanathan	6^{5}	6	[10]
3	(Netherlands) J-J Rojer (United States) T Winegar	7^{7}	6
(United Kingdom) B Jones (United Kingdom) J Paris	6^{1}	1
(Australia) A Bolt (Australia) Ja Delaney	3	3
(Australia) C Puttergill (Australia) D Sweeny	6	6
(Chinese Taipei) Y-h Hsu (Japan) S Watanabe	1	3
(Japan) Y Shimizu (Japan) K Uesugi	6	6
WC	(South Korea) Y-s Chung (South Korea) U-s Park	3	4
4	(Thailand) P Isaro (India) N Kaliyanda Poonacha	6	6
(South Korea) J-s Nam (Finland) P Niklas-Salminen	6	7^{7}
PR	(Japan) T Matsui (India) S Myneni	4	6^{4}
(India) RC Bollipalli (India) A Kadhe	6^{5}	4
2	(India) A Chandrasekar (Japan) T Yuzuki	7^{7}	6

Quarterfinals
1	(United States) M Kiger (United States) R Stalder	4	6	[10]
(Germany) D Masur (India) R Ramanathan	6	3	[6]
3	(Netherlands) J-J Rojer (United States) T Winegar	6	7
(Australia) C Puttergill (Australia) D Sweeny	3	5
(Japan) Y Shimizu (Japan) K Uesugi	4	6^{7}
4	(Thailand) P Isaro (India) N Kaliyanda Poonacha	6	7^{9}
(South Korea) J-s Nam (Finland) P Niklas-Salminen	6^{7}	6	[7]
2	(India) A Chandrasekar (Japan) T Yuzuki	7^{9}	3	[10]

Semifinals
1	(United States) M Kiger (United States) R Stalder	2	6	[10]
3	(Netherlands) J-J Rojer (United States) T Winegar	6	4	[8]
4	(Thailand) P Isaro (India) N Kaliyanda Poonacha	6^{5}	5
2	(India) A Chandrasekar (Japan) T Yuzuki	7^{7}	7

Final
1	(United States) M Kiger (United States) R Stalder	6	6^{7}	[10]
2	(India) A Chandrasekar (Japan) T Yuzuki	4	7^{9}	[8]
