= 2026 Seoul Open Challenger – Doubles =

Doubles
- 2026 Seoul Open Challenger

Final
- Champions: (New Zealand) Finn Reynolds (New Zealand) James Watt
- Runners-up: (Australia) Blake Bayldon (Australia) Thomas Fancutt
- Score: 6–3, 3–6, [10–5]

Events
Singles	Doubles
- Seoul Open Challenger

Nathaniel Lammons and Jean-Julien Rojer were the defending champions but only Lammons chose to defend his title, partnering Jackson Withrow. They lost in the first round to Jay Friend and Rei Sakamoto.

Finn Reynolds and James Watt won the title after defeating Blake Bayldon and Thomas Fancutt 6–3, 3–6, [10–5] in the final.

== Seeds ==
1. (India) Yuki Bhambri / (Chinese Taipei) Ray Ho (semifinals)
2. (Australia) Jason Kubler / (Australia) John Peers (first round)
3. (United States) Nathaniel Lammons / (United States) Jackson Withrow (first round)
4. (New Zealand) Finn Reynolds / (New Zealand) James Watt (champions)

== Draw ==
Key

- Q = Qualifier
- WC = Wild card
- LL = Lucky loser
- Alt = Alternate
- ITF = ITF entry
- PR = Protected ranking
- SR = Special ranking
- SE = Special exempt
- JE = Junior exempt
- JR = Junior Accelerator Programme entrant
- CO = College Accelerator Programme entrant
- NG = Next Gen Accelerator Program entrant
- w/o = Walkover
- r = Retired
- d = Defaulted

First round
1	(India) Y Bhambri (Chinese Taipei) R Ho	6	6
(Australia) Je Delaney (Australia) C Puttergill	3	2
(Netherlands) T Loof (Japan) K Uesugi	6	7^{8}
(Bulgaria) A Donski (Czech Republic) D Poljak	4	6^{6}
4	(New Zealand) F Reynolds (New Zealand) J Watt	6	3	[11]
(India) S Banthia (New Zealand) A Rai	3	6	[9]
(United States) A Ayeni (United States) Andre Ilagan	4	6	[12]
(Israel) D Cukierman (Brazil) F Romboli	6	3	[10]
(Thailand) P Isaro (South Korea) J-s Nam	6	7^{7}
PR	(Japan) T Matsui (India) R Ramanathan	3	6^{0}
(Japan) J Friend (Japan) R Sakamoto	7^{7}	7^{8}
3	(United States) N Lammons (United States) J Withrow	6^{3}	6^{6}
WC	(South Korea) Y-s Chung (South Korea) Kim Jang-jun	7	3	[8]
WC	(South Korea) Kim Dong-ju (South Korea) U-s Park	5	6	[10]
(Australia) B Bayldon (Australia) T Fancutt	6	7^{7}
2	(Australia) J Kubler (Australia) J Peers	3	6^{4}

Quarterfinals
1	(India) Y Bhambri (Chinese Taipei) R Ho	7^{10}	6
(Netherlands) T Loof (Japan) K Uesugi	6^{8}	3
4	(New Zealand) F Reynolds (New Zealand) J Watt	6	7^{7}
(United States) A Ayeni (United States) A Ilagan	1	6^{0}
(Thailand) P Isaro (South Korea) J-s Nam	w/o
(Japan) J Friend (Japan) R Sakamoto
WC	(South Korea) D-j Kim (South Korea) U-s Park	1	4
(Australia) B Bayldon (Australia) T Fancutt	6	6

Semifinals
1	(India) Y Bhambri (Chinese Taipei) R Ho	3	4
4	(New Zealand) F Reynolds (New Zealand) J Watt	6	6
(Thailand) P Isaro (South Korea) J-s Nam
(Australia) B Bayldon (Australia) T Fancutt	w/o

Final
4	(New Zealand) F Reynolds (New Zealand) J Watt	6	3	[10]
(Australia) B Bayldon (Australia) T Fancutt	3	6	[5]
