= 2026 Seoul Open Challenger =

- Date: 26 October – 1 November
- Edition: 10th
- Surface: Hard
- Location: Seoul, South Korea

Champions

Singles
- (France) Térence Atmane

Doubles
- (New Zealand) Finn Reynolds / (New Zealand) James Watt
- Seoul Open Challenger

The 2026 Eugene Seoul Open Challenger was a professional tennis tournament played on outdoor hard courts. It was the 10th edition of the tournament. It was part of the 2026 ATP Challenger Tour. It took place in Seoul, South Korea, between 26 October and 1 November 2026.

== Singles main draw entrants ==
=== Seeds ===
Country	Player	Rank^{1}	Seed
CRO	Marin Čilić	84	1
CHN	Bu Yunchaokete	91	2
HKG	Coleman Wong	92	3
FRA	Térence Atmane	98	4
RSA	Lloyd Harris	104	5
CHN	Wu Yibing	106	6
JPN	Sho Shimabukuro	109	7
AUS	Aleksandar Vukic	116	8

- ^{1} Rankings as of 19 October 2026.

=== Other entrants ===
The following players received wildcards into the singles main draw:

- (South Korea) Cho Min-yuk
- (South Korea) Hong Seong-chan
- (South Korea) Kim Jang-jun

The following players received entry from the qualifying draw:

- (South Korea) Chung Yun-seong
- (Japan) Shintaro Imai
- (Australia) Omar Jasika
- Alibek Kachmazov
- (United States) Christian Langmo
- (Kazakhstan) ~~Beibit Zhukayev~~

The following players received entry as lucky losers:

- (Japan) Koki Matsuda
- (South Korea) Shin San-hui

== Champions ==
=== Singles ===
- (France) Térence Atmane def. (Hong Kong) Coleman Wong 7–6^{(7–3)}, 3–6, 7–6^{(11–9)}.

=== Doubles ===
- (New Zealand) Finn Reynolds / (New Zealand) James Watt def. (Australia) Blake Bayldon / (Australia) Thomas Fancutt 6–3, 3–6, [10–5].
