= 2019 Seoul Open Challenger – Singles =

Singles
- 2019 Seoul Open Challenger

Final
- Champion: (South Korea) Kwon Soon-woo
- Runner-up: (Australia) Max Purcell
- Score: 7–5, 7–5

Events
Singles	Doubles
- Seoul Open Challenger

Mackenzie McDonald was the defending champion but chose not to defend his title.

Kwon Soon-woo won the title after defeating Max Purcell 7–5, 7–5 in the final.

== Seeds ==
All seeds receive a bye into the second round.

1. (Australia) Jordan Thompson (withdrew)
2. (Lithuania) Ričardas Berankis (third round)
3. (Ukraine) Sergiy Stakhovsky (third round)
4. (Canada) Brayden Schnur (second round)
5. (Slovakia) Lukáš Lacko (third round)
6. (Chinese Taipei) Jason Jung (second round)
7. (Cyprus) Marcos Baghdatis (second round)
8. (Russia) Evgeny Donskoy (third round)
9. (Australia) Alex Bolt (quarterfinals)
10. (India) Ramkumar Ramanathan (third round)
11. (South Korea) Kwon Soon-woo (champion)
12. (Japan) Tatsuma Ito (quarterfinals)
13. (Serbia) Nikola Milojević (semifinals)
14. (Belgium) Ruben Bemelmans (second round)
15. (Japan) Hiroki Moriya (second round)
16. (Japan) Yūichi Sugita (second round)

== Draw ==
Key

- Q = Qualifier
- WC = Wild card
- LL = Lucky loser
- Alt = Alternate
- ITF = ITF entry
- PR = Protected ranking
- SR = Special ranking
- SE = Special exempt
- JE = Junior exempt
- JR = Junior Accelerator Programme entrant
- CO = College Accelerator Programme entrant
- NG = Next Gen Accelerator Program entrant
- w/o = Walkover
- r = Retired
- d = Defaulted

=== Finals ===
Quarterfinals
(Japan) Yasutaka Uchiyama	4	7^{8}	5
11	(South Korea) Kwon Soon-woo	6	6^{6}	7
(Chinese Taipei) Wu Tung-lin	7	6
9	(Australia) Alex Bolt	5	4
(China) Li Zhe	4	5
13	(Serbia) Nikola Milojević	6	7
12	(Japan) Tatsuma Ito	7^{8}	6^{2}	3
(Australia) Max Purcell	6^{6}	7^{7}	6

Semifinals
11	(South Korea) Kwon Soon-woo	7^{7}	6
(Chinese Taipei) Wu Tung-lin	6^{4}	3
13	(Serbia) Nikola Milojević	2	0
(Australia) Max Purcell	6	6

Final
11	(South Korea) Kwon Soon-woo	7	7
(Australia) Max Purcell	5	5

=== Top half ===
==== Section 1 ====
First round
(Turkey) C İlkel	3	6	3
(Japan) Y Uchiyama	6	1	6
(France) S Robert	6	2	4
(South Korea) Y-s Chung	1	6	6
ITF	(Japan) Shintaro Imai	6	6
WC	(South Korea) Ho Chung	1	3
ITF	(China) Y Bai	6	6
Q	(Australia) Jacob Grills	4	1

Second round
Alt	(India) S Balaji	7^{7}	3	4
(Japan) Y Uchiyama	6^{5}	6	6
(South Korea) Y-s Chung	6	6
16	(Japan) Y Sugita	2	3
11	(South Korea) S-w Kwon	6	6
ITF	(Japan) S Imai	3	2
ITF	(China) Y Bai	6	3	3
8	(Russia) E Donskoy	4	6	6

Third round
(Japan) Y Uchiyama	6	6
(South Korea) Y-s Chung	4	4
11	(South Korea) S-w Kwon	7^{7}	6
8	(Russia) E Donskoy	6^{2}	3

Quarterfinals
(Japan) Y Uchiyama	4	7^{8}	5
11	(South Korea) S-w Kwon	6	6^{6}	7

==== Section 2 ====
First round
(Japan) K Uchida	6	1	4
(Chinese Taipei) T-l Wu	4	6	6
LL	(China) Xia Zihao	4	1
(India) S Myneni	6	6
(Japan) G Soeda	6	4	4
(Chinese Taipei) T-h Yang	2	6	6
(Australia) A Santillan	d
ITF	(Egypt) Y Hossam

Second round
4	(Canada) B Schnur	1	7^{8}	2
(Chinese Taipei) T-l Wu	6	6^{6}	6
(India) S Myneni	6	6
15	(Japan) H Moriya	2	1
9	(Australia) A Bolt	7^{7}	6^{3}	6
(Chinese Taipei) T-h Yang	6^{5}	7^{7}	3
(Australia) A Santillan	6	5	7^{7}
6	(Chinese Taipei) J Jung	3	7	6^{3}

Third round
(Chinese Taipei) T-l Wu	6	7
(India) S Myneni	4	5
9	(Australia) A Bolt	7^{7}	6
(Australia) A Santillan	6^{4}	3

Quarterfinals
(Chinese Taipei) T-l Wu	7	6
9	(Australia) A Bolt	5	4

=== Bottom half ===
==== Section 3 ====
First round
ITF	(Tunisia) M Echargui	2	4
(China) Z Li	6	6
Q	(South Korea) J-s Nam	7	6
(South Korea) D-h Lee	5	1
WC	(South Korea) Kim Dong-ju	2	2
WC	(South Korea) J-m Lee	6	6
ITF	(Japan) R Noguchi	3	6	6
WC	(South Korea) S-c Hong	6	4	0

Second round
7	(Cyprus) M Baghdatis	4	2
(China) Z Li	6	6
Q	(South Korea) J-s Nam	3	6^{6}
10	(India) R Ramanathan	6	7^{8}
13	(Serbia) N Milojević	6^{1}	6	6
WC	(South Korea) J-m Lee	7^{7}	3	3
ITF	(Japan) R Noguchi	1	4
3	(Ukraine) S Stakhovsky	6	6

Third round
(China) Z Li	6	6^{5}	7^{8}
10	(India) R Ramanathan	4	7^{7}	6^{6}
13	(Serbia) N Milojević	6	7^{7}
3	(Ukraine) S Stakhovsky	2	6^{5}

Quarterfinals
(China) Z Li	4	5
13	(Serbia) N Milojević	6	7

==== Section 4 ====
First round
(India) S Mukund	2	4
(Australia) L Saville	6	6
WC	(South Korea) Shin San-hui	2	0
(Canada) F Peliwo	6	6
(Australia) M Banes	6^{4}	3
(Australia) M Purcell	7^{7}	6
(Bosnia and Herzegovina) A Šetkić	7	7^{7}
(Portugal) G Oliveira	5	6^{4}

Second round
5	(Slovakia) L Lacko	6	6
(Australia) L Saville	3	4
(Canada) F Peliwo	5	2
12	(Japan) T Ito	7	6
14	(Belgium) R Bemelmans	2	6^{4}
(Australia) M Purcell	6	7^{7}
(Bosnia and Herzegovina) A Šetkić	4	6	4
2	(Lithuania) R Berankis	6	3	6

Third round
5	(Slovakia) L Lacko	4	1
12	(Japan) T Ito	6	6
(Australia) M Purcell	4	6	6
2	(Lithuania) R Berankis	6	4	3

Quarterfinals
12	(Japan) T Ito	7^{8}	6^{2}	3
(Australia) M Purcell	6^{6}	7^{7}	6
