= 2019 Seoul Open Challenger – Doubles =

Doubles
- 2019 Seoul Open Challenger

Final
- Champions: (Australia) Max Purcell (Australia) Luke Saville
- Runners-up: (Belgium) Ruben Bemelmans (Ukraine) Sergiy Stakhovsky
- Score: 6–4, 7–6^{(9–7)}

Events
Singles	Doubles
- Seoul Open Challenger

Toshihide Matsui and Frederik Nielsen were the defending champions but only Matsui chose to defend his title, partnering Ričardas Berankis. Matsui lost in the first round to Nam Ji-sung and Song Min-kyu.

Max Purcell and Luke Saville won the title after defeating Ruben Bemelmans and Sergiy Stakhovsky 6–4, 7–6^{(9–7)} in the final.

== Seeds ==
1. (Australia) Max Purcell / (Australia) Luke Saville (champions)
2. (India) Sriram Balaji / (Israel) Jonathan Erlich (first round)
3. (Netherlands) Sander Arends / (Austria) Tristan-Samuel Weissborn (semifinals)
4. (Netherlands) David Pel / (Chile) Hans Podlipnik Castillo (first round, retired)

== Draw ==
Key

- Q = Qualifier
- WC = Wild card
- LL = Lucky loser
- Alt = Alternate
- ITF = ITF entry
- PR = Protected ranking
- SR = Special ranking
- SE = Special exempt
- JE = Junior exempt
- JR = Junior Accelerator Programme entrant
- CO = College Accelerator Programme entrant
- NG = Next Gen Accelerator Program entrant
- w/o = Walkover
- r = Retired
- d = Defaulted

First round
1	(Australia) M Purcell (Australia) L Saville	6	6
(Russia) E Donskoy (India) V Vardhan	4	2
WC	(South Korea) Y-s Chung (South Korea) D-h Lee	6	7
WC	(South Korea) Kim Yu-seob (South Korea) Lim Hyung-chan	2	5
3	(Netherlands) S Arends (Austria) T-S Weissborn	6	7
(Philippines) R Gonzales (Thailand) Sa Ratiwatana	1	5
(China) Z Li (Portugal) G Oliveira	4	2
(Sweden) A Göransson (United States) H Reese	6	6
WC	(South Korea) Ho Chung (South Korea) J-m Lee	1	2
(Belgium) R Bemelmans (Ukraine) S Stakhovsky	6	6
ITF	(Philippines) F Alcantara (Japan) Shintaro Imai	1	4
4	(Netherlands) D Pel (Chile) H Podlipnik Castillo	6	1^{r}
(Lithuania) R Berankis (Japan) T Matsui	2	1
ITF	(South Korea) J-s Nam (South Korea) M-k Song	6	6
(India) R Ramanathan (Canada) B Schnur	6	7^{7}
2	(India) S Balaji (Israel) J Erlich	4	6^{4}

Quarterfinals
1	(Australia) M Purcell (Australia) L Saville	4	7	[10]
WC	(South Korea) Y-s Chung (South Korea) D-h Lee	6	5	[6]
3	(Netherlands) S Arends (Austria) T-S Weissborn	3	6	[13]
(Sweden) A Göransson (United States) H Reese	6	3	[11]
(Belgium) R Bemelmans (Ukraine) S Stakhovsky	6	6
ITF	(Philippines) F Alcantara (Japan) S Imai	3	4
ITF	(South Korea) J-s Nam (South Korea) M-k Song	3	7	[6]
(India) R Ramanathan (Canada) B Schnur	6	5	[10]

Semifinals
1	(Australia) M Purcell (Australia) L Saville	7^{7}	6
3	(Netherlands) S Arends (Austria) T-S Weissborn	6^{5}	3
(Belgium) R Bemelmans (Ukraine) S Stakhovsky	6	6
(India) R Ramanathan (Canada) B Schnur	1	3

Final
1	(Australia) M Purcell (Australia) L Saville	6	7^{9}
(Belgium) R Bemelmans (Ukraine) S Stakhovsky	4	6^{7}
