= 2017 Seoul Open Challenger – Singles =

Singles
- 2017 Seoul Open Challenger

Final
- Champion: (Italy) Thomas Fabbiano
- Runner-up: (South Korea) Kwon Soon-woo
- Score: 1–6, 6–4, 6–3

Events
Singles	Doubles
- Seoul Open Challenger

Sergiy Stakhovsky was the defending champion but chose not to defend his title.

Thomas Fabbiano won the title after defeating Kwon Soon-woo 1–6, 6–4, 6–3 in the final.

== Seeds ==
1. (Chinese Taipei) Lu Yen-hsun (first round)
2. (South Korea) Chung Hyeon (withdrew)
3. (Israel) Dudi Sela (quarterfinals, retired)
4. (Russia) Konstantin Kravchuk (first round)
5. (Canada) Vasek Pospisil (second round)
6. (Slovenia) Blaž Kavčič (first round)
7. (Ukraine) Illya Marchenko (first round)
8. (Belgium) Ruben Bemelmans (semifinals)

== Draw ==
Key

- Q = Qualifier
- WC = Wild card
- LL = Lucky loser
- Alt = Alternate
- ITF = ITF entry
- PR = Protected ranking
- SR = Special ranking
- SE = Special exempt
- JE = Junior exempt
- JR = Junior Accelerator Programme entrant
- CO = College Accelerator Programme entrant
- NG = Next Gen Accelerator Program entrant
- w/o = Walkover
- r = Retired
- d = Defaulted

=== Finals ===
Semifinals
8	(Belgium) Ruben Bemelmans	4	1
(Italy) Thomas Fabbiano	6	6
(South Korea) Lee Duck-hee	3	0
(South Korea) Kwon Soon-woo	6	6

Final
(Italy) Thomas Fabbiano	1	6	6
(South Korea) Kwon Soon-woo	6	4	3

=== Top half ===
First round
1	(Chinese Taipei) Y-h Lu	3	4
WC	(South Korea) Y-s Chung	6	6
SE	(United Kingdom) L Broady	3	4
(Japan) H Moriya	6	6
(Japan) A Santillan	7	4	3
LL	(Australia) L Saville	5	6	6
(United Kingdom) B Klein	4	6	1
8	(Belgium) R Bemelmans	6	3	6
4	(Russia) K Kravchuk	4	3
(Japan) G Soeda	6	6
PR	(United Kingdom) A Ward	3	4
WC	(South Korea) Kim Young-seok	6	6
(Australia) O Jasika	4	7^{8}	6^{1}
(Switzerland) M Chiudinelli	6	6^{6}	7^{7}
(Italy) T Fabbiano	6	6
7	(Ukraine) I Marchenko	2	4

Second round
WC	(South Korea) Y-s Chung	6	6^{4}	3
(Japan) H Moriya	4	7^{7}	6
LL	(Australia) L Saville	4	6	5
8	(Belgium) R Bemelmans	6	3	7
(Japan) G Soeda	6	6
WC	(South Korea) Y-s Kim	2	4
(Switzerland) M Chiudinelli	1	2
(Italy) T Fabbiano	6	6

Quarterfinals
(Japan) H Moriya	3	1
8	(Belgium) R Bemelmans	6	6
(Japan) G Soeda	6	2	3
(Italy) T Fabbiano	3	6	6

Semifinals
8	(Belgium) R Bemelmans	4	1
(Italy) T Fabbiano	6	6

=== Bottom half ===
First round
5	(Canada) V Pospisil	6	6
(France) S Doumbia	3	2
(South Korea) D-h Lee	6	6
Q	(Japan) Shuichi Sekiguchi	0	3
(United States) S Bangoura	2	1
Q	(Canada) F Auger-Aliassime	6	6
WC	(South Korea) Ho Chung	5	3
3	(Israel) D Sela	7	6
6	(Slovenia) B Kavčič	6^{4}	3
(South Korea) S-w Kwon	7^{7}	6
(Japan) T Ito	2	3
Alt	(Serbia) M Tepavac	6	6
Q	(United States) A Krajicek	7^{16}	6
WC	(South Korea) S-c Hong	6^{14}	3
(United States) A Sarkissian	6	6
Q	(United States) D Nguyen	3	4

Second round
5	(Canada) V Pospisil	6	6^{3}	6^{6}
(South Korea) D-h Lee	2	7^{7}	7^{8}
Q	(Canada) F Auger-Aliassime	3	1
3	(Israel) D Sela	6	6
(South Korea) S-w Kwon	7^{7}	6
Alt	(Serbia) M Tepavac	6^{1}	1
Q	(United States) A Krajicek	1	2
(United States) A Sarkissian	6	6

Quarterfinals
(South Korea) D-h Lee	5	7^{9}	3
3	(Israel) D Sela	7	6^{7}	0^{r}
(South Korea) S-w Kwon	6^{7}	6	6
(United States) A Sarkissian	7^{9}	4	3

Semifinals
(South Korea) D-h Lee	3	0
(South Korea) S-w Kwon	6	6
