= 2014 Seoul Open Women's Challenger =

- Date: 21–27 April
- Edition: 1st
- Category: ITF Women's Circuit
- Prize money: $50,000
- Surface: Hard
- Location: Seoul, South Korea

Champions

Singles
- (Japan) Misaki Doi

Doubles
- (Chinese Taipei) Chan Chin-wei / (Chinese Taipei) Chuang Chia-jung
| Seoul Open Women's Challenger | · 2015 → |

The 2014 Seoul Open Women's Challenger was a professional tennis tournament played on outdoor hard courts. It was the first edition of the tournament and part of the 2014 ITF Women's Circuit, offering a total of $50,000 in prize money. It took place in Seoul, South Korea, on 21–27 April 2014.

== Singles main draw entrants ==
=== Seeds ===
| Country | Player | Rank^{1} | Seed |
|---|---|---|---|
| JPN | Kimiko Date-Krumm | 83 | 1 |
| JPN | Misaki Doi | 99 | 2 |
| JPN | Ayumi Morita | 113 | 3 |
| HUN | Tímea Babos | 119 | 4 |
| TPE | Hsieh Su-wei | 126 | 5 |
| BEL | An-Sophie Mestach | 127 | 6 |
| CZE | Kristýna Plíšková | 139 | 7 |
| JPN | Risa Ozaki | 181 | 8 |

- ^{1} Rankings as of 14 April 2014

=== Other entrants ===
The following players received wildcards into the singles main draw:

- (South Korea) Choi Ji-hee
- (South Korea) Choi Su-yeon
- (South Korea) Lee So-ra
- (South Korea) Lee Ye-ra

The following players received entry from the qualifying draw:

- (Japan) Shiho Akita
- (Chinese Taipei) Chan Chin-wei
- (South Korea) Hong Hyun-hui
- (Japan) Miki Miyamura

The following players received entry with a protected ranking:

- (Uzbekistan) Akgul Amanmuradova
- (Australia) Jarmila Gajdošová
- (Russia) Ksenia Lykina

The following player received entry with a junior exempt:

- (Serbia) Ivana Jorović

== Champions ==
=== Singles ===
- (Japan) Misaki Doi def. (Japan) Misa Eguchi 6–1, 7–6^{(7–3)}

=== Doubles ===
- (Chinese Taipei) Chan Chin-wei / (Chinese Taipei) Chuang Chia-jung def. (France) Irena Pavlovic / (Czech Republic) Kristýna Plíšková 6–4, 6–3
