= Seoul Open Challenger =

Seoul Open
- 2025 Seoul Open Challenger

Tournament information
- Event name: Eugene Seoul Open
- Location: Seoul, South Korea
- Venue: Seoul Olympic Park Tennis Center
- Surface: Hard
ATP Tour
- Category: Challenger 125 (2023, 2026-), Challenger 100 (2024-2025)
- Draw: 32S / 32Q / 16D
- Prize money: $133,250 (2024)
WTA Tour
- Category: ITF Women's Circuit
- Draw: 32S / 32Q / 16D
- Prize money: $50,000

The Eugene Seoul Open is a tournament for professional tennis players played on outdoor hardcourts. The event is classified as an ATP Challenger 125 (since 2026) and an ITF Women's Circuit event and has been held in Seoul, South Korea, since 2014.

In 2024 it switched status from a Challenger 125 to a Challenger 100, and in 2026 it returned to the Challenger 125 level.

== Men's champions ==
=== Singles ===
| Year | Champion | Runner-up | Score |
|---|---|---|---|
| 2026 | (France) Térence Atmane | (Hong Kong) Coleman Wong | 7–6^{(7–3)}, 3–6, 7–6^{(11–9)} |
| 2025 | (Japan) Sho Shimabukuro | (Hong Kong) Coleman Wong | 6–4, 6–3 |
| 2024 | (Georgia (country)) Nikoloz Basilashvili | (Japan) Taro Daniel | 7–5, 6–4 |
| 2023 | (China) Bu Yunchaokete | (Australia) Aleksandar Vukic | 7–6^{(7–4)}, 6–4 |
| 2022 | (Australia) Li Tu | (China) Wu Yibing | 7–6^{(7–5)}, 6–4 |
| 2020–2021 | not held | | |
| 2019 | (South Korea) Kwon Soon-woo | (Australia) Max Purcell | 7–5, 7–5 |
| 2018 | (United States) Mackenzie McDonald | (Australia) Jordan Thompson | 1–6, 6–4, 6–1 |
| 2017 | (Italy) Thomas Fabbiano | (South Korea) Kwon Soon-woo | 1–6, 6–4, 6–3 |
| 2016 | (Ukraine) Sergiy Stakhovsky | (Chinese Taipei) Lu Yen-hsun | 4–6, 6–3, 7–6^{(9–7)} |
| 2015 | (Japan) Go Soeda | (South Korea) Chung Hyeon | 3–6, 6–3, 6–3 |

=== Doubles ===
| Year | Champions | Runners-up | Score |
|---|---|---|---|
| 2026 | (New Zealand) Finn Reynolds (New Zealand) James Watt | (Australia) Blake Bayldon (Australia) Thomas Fancutt | 6–3, 3–6, [10–5] |
| 2025 | (United States) Nathaniel Lammons (Netherlands) Jean-Julien Rojer | (United States) George Goldhoff (United States) Theodore Winegar | 6–3, 6–4 |
| 2024 | (India) Saketh Myneni (India) Ramkumar Ramanathan | (United States) Vasil Kirkov (Netherlands) Bart Stevens | 6–4, 4–6, [10–3] |
| 2023 | (Australia) Max Purcell (Japan) Yasutaka Uchiyama | (South Korea) Chung Yun-seong (Japan) Yuta Shimizu | 6–1, 6–4 |
| 2022 | (Japan) Kaichi Uchida (Chinese Taipei) Wu Tung-lin | (South Korea) Chung Yun-seong (United States) Aleksandar Kovacevic | 6–7^{(2–7)}, 7–5, [11–9] |
| 2020–2021 | not held | | |
| 2019 | (Australia) Max Purcell (Australia) Luke Saville | (Belgium) Ruben Bemelmans (Ukraine) Sergiy Stakhovsky | 6–4, 7–6^{(9–7)} |
| 2018 | (Japan) Toshihide Matsui (Denmark) Frederik Nielsen | (Chinese Taipei) Chen Ti (Chinese Taipei) Yi Chu-huan | 6–4, 7–6^{(7–3)} |
| 2017 | (Chinese Taipei) Hsieh Cheng-peng (Chinese Taipei) Peng Hsien-yin | (Italy) Thomas Fabbiano (Israel) Dudi Sela | 5–1 ret. |
| 2016 | (Australia) Matt Reid (Australia) John-Patrick Smith | (China) Gong Maoxin (Chinese Taipei) Yi Chu-huan | 6–3, 7–5 |
| 2015 | (China) Gong Maoxin (Chinese Taipei) Peng Hsien-yin | (South Korea) Lee Hyung-taik (Thailand) Danai Udomchoke | 6–4, 7–5 |

== Women's champions ==
=== Singles ===
| Year | Champion | Runner-up | Score |
|---|---|---|---|
| 2015 | (Japan) Riko Sawayanagi | (South Korea) Jang Su-jeong | 6–4, 6–4 |
| 2014 | (Japan) Misaki Doi | (Japan) Misa Eguchi | 6–1, 7–6^{(7–3)} |

=== Doubles ===
| Year | Champions | Runners-up | Score |
|---|---|---|---|
| 2015 | (Chinese Taipei) Chan Chin-wei (Chinese Taipei) Lee Ya-hsuan | (South Korea) Hong Seung-yeon (South Korea) Kang Seo-kyung | 6–2, 6–1 |
| 2014 | (Chinese Taipei) Chan Chin-wei (Chinese Taipei) Chuang Chia-jung | (France) Irena Pavlovic (Czech Republic) Kristýna Plíšková | 6–4, 6–3 |
