= Kwon Soon-woo =

South Korean tennis player

Kwon Soon-woo 권순우
- Kwon at the 2026 Wimbledon Championships
- Country (sports): South Korea
- Born: 2 December 1997 (age 28) Sangju, South Korea
- Height: 1.80 m (5 ft 11 in)
- Turned pro: 2015
- Plays: Right-handed (two-handed backhand)
- Coach: Daniel Yoo
- Prize money: US $3,367,154

Singles
- Career record: 71–75
- Career titles: 2
- Highest ranking: No. 52 (1 November 2021)
- Current ranking: No. 158 (28 September 2026)

Grand Slam singles results
- Australian Open: 2R (2022)
- French Open: 3R (2021)
- Wimbledon: 2R (2021, 2026)
- US Open: 2R (2020, 2022)

Doubles
- Career record: 7–15
- Career titles: 0
- Highest ranking: No. 224 (19 December 2022)
- Current ranking: No. 1,485 (31 August 2026)

Grand Slam doubles results
- Australian Open: 3R (2022)
- French Open: 1R (2020, 2022)
- Wimbledon: 1R (2022)
- US Open: 1R (2021, 2022, 2024)

Team competitions
- Davis Cup: 9–3 (singles 9–2, doubles 0–1)
Medal record
Men's tennis
Representing South Korea
Asian Games
Bronze medal – third place	2022 Hangzhou	Doubles
- Last updated on: 31 August 2026.

- Kwon Soon-woo
- Hangul: 권순우
- RR: Gwon Sunu
- MR: Kwŏn Sunu

Kwon Soon-woo (Korean: 권순우; born 2 December 1997) is a South Korean professional tennis player. He has been ranked as high as world No. 52 ranking by the ATP, achieved in November 2021 and a doubles ranking of world No. 224, attained in December 2022. Kwon has won two ATP, six ATP Challenger Tour and five ITF World Tennis Tour singles titles.

He broke into the top 100 of the ATP singles rankings in August 2019 after reaching the quarterfinals at the Los Cabos Open and contested his first ATP Tour final at the Astana Open in September 2021, where he won his maiden title and made his top 60 debut. In January 2023, he won his second ATP Tour title at the Adelaide International as a lucky loser, becoming the first Korean to win multiple ATP titles and the tenth lucky loser champion overall in the Open Era.

== Early life ==
Kwon was born in a small town Sangju and began playing tennis at age 10. He moved to Seoul at age 16 and attended high school there with Lee Duck-hee, another future ATP Tour player. His father Younghun is a talented amateur tennis player and introduced him to tennis. His favorite surface is hard and favorite shots are down-the-line forehand and drop shot.

== Professional career ==
=== 2018–2019: ATP Tour & Grand Slam & top 100 debuts ===
Kwon made his tour-level and Grand Slam debut after winning the 2018 Asia-Pacific Wildcard Playoff for the main draw of the 2018 Australian Open.

He made his top 100 debut on 5 August 2019 at world No. 97, after reaching the quarterfinals as a qualifier at the 2019 Los Cabos Open.

=== 2020–2021: First major win at the US Open; French Open third round, maiden ATP title ===
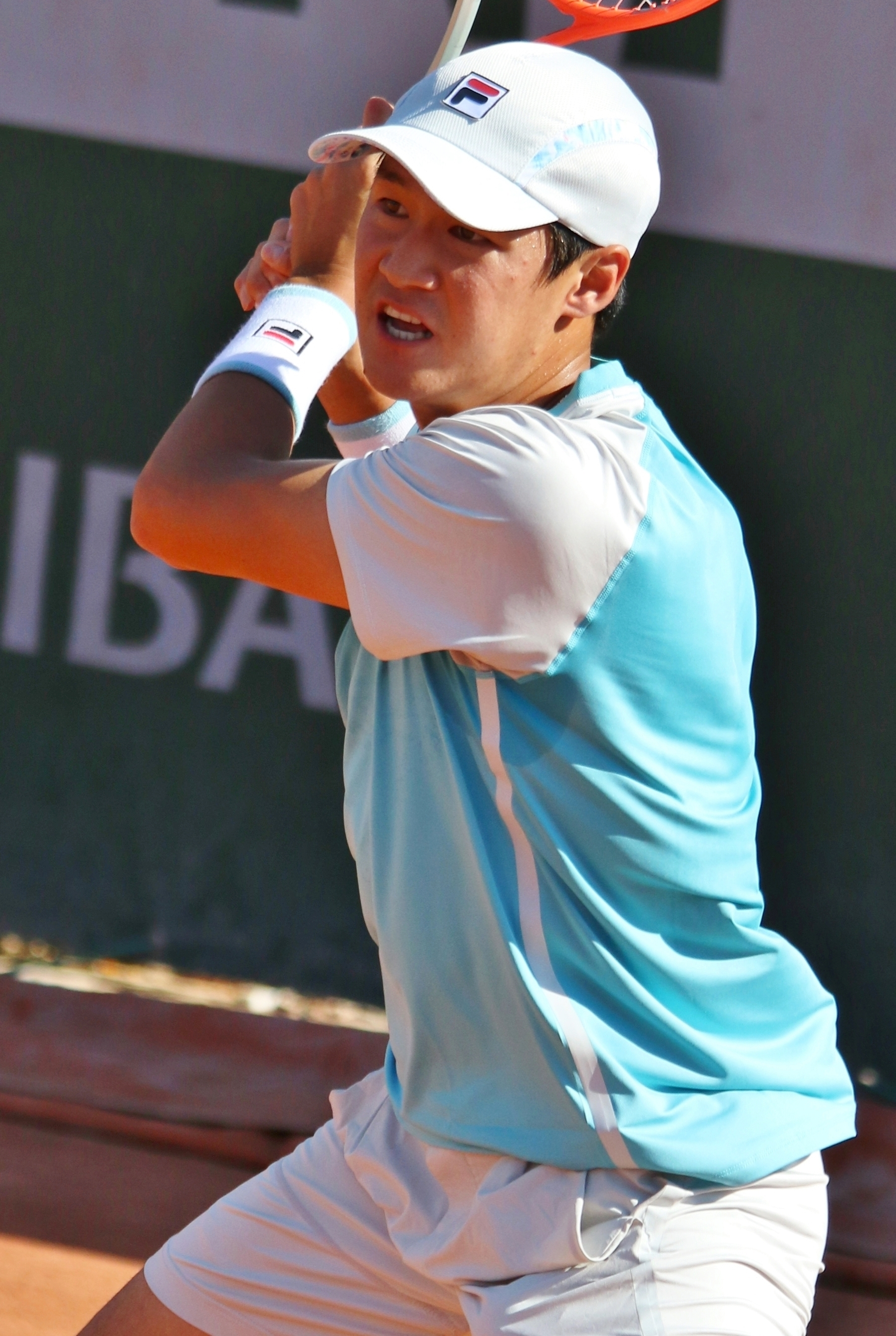
Kwon at the 2021 French Open

In February 2020, Kwon reached four consecutive ATP Tour-level quarterfinals in Pune, New York, Delray Beach and Acapulco. As a result, Kwon rose to a career-high ranking of 69 on 2 March 2020. Kwon defeated world No. 24, Dušan Lajović, in straight sets to reach the quarterfinals in Acapulco, which was his first ATP 500 event. He lost to eventual champion Rafael Nadal in the quarterfinals.

At the 2020 US Open Kwon recorded his first win in a Grand Slam defeating wildcard Thai-Son Kwiatkowski.

Kwon reached the third round of a Grand Slam for the first time in his career at the 2021 French Open where he defeated South African Kevin Anderson and Andreas Seppi before losing to another Italian ninth seed and eventual quarterfinalist Matteo Berrettini.

Despite losing in qualifying at the Eastbourne International, Kwon entered with a second-round bye as a lucky loser after Reilly Opelka withdrew. He made the semifinals before falling to Alex de Minaur. Kwon was competing in his maiden ATP Tour semifinal after winning his first quarterfinal in his eighth attempt against Ilya Ivashka.

In Astana, Kwon won his first ATP Tour-level title. There, he defeated qualifier Evgeny Donskoy, third seed Dušan Lajović, and seventh seed Laslo Đere to reach his second ATP semifinal. In the semifinal, he defeated home favourite and second seed Alexander Bublik to advance to his first ATP Tour-level final. He defeated James Duckworth in straight sets to win his first ATP title and became the first South Korean to win on the ATP Tour and only the second Korean to win a tour-level title in the Open era since 2003 Sydney champion Hyung-Taik Lee. As a result, he reached a new career-high of No. 57 on 27 September 2021.

=== 2022: Maiden ATP 500 singles semifinal, Australian Open doubles third round ===
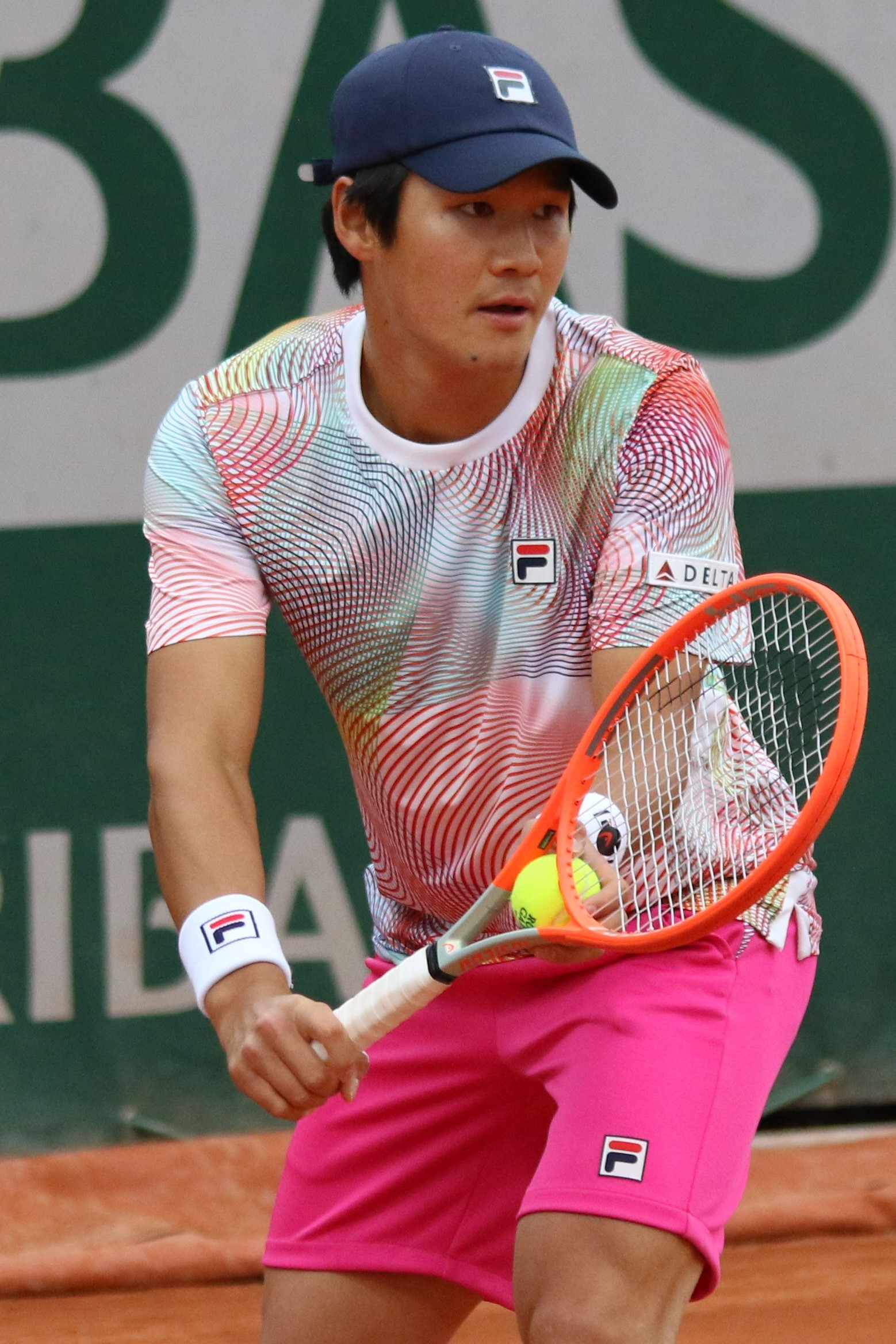
Kwon at the 2022 French Open

At the Australian Open, he won his first match defeating Holger Rune in five sets. He lost in the second round to Denis Shapovalov in a tight five-set match with three tiebreaks.

At Wimbledon, he lost in the first round to the top seed and eventual champion, Novak Djokovic, in four sets.

Ranked No. 120 at the Japan Open, he reached the quarterfinals for a second time at the ATP 500-level defeating sixth seed Alex de Minaur and Mackenzie McDonald. He defeated Pedro Martínez to reach his first ATP 500-level semifinal. As a result, he moved more than 30 positions up in the rankings, back into the top 100.

=== 2023–2024: Second title won as lucky loser, hiatus, Olympics debut ===
He won his second career ATP title in Adelaide, defeating Roberto Bautista Agut in three sets. In doing so, he became the first Korean to win multiple ATP titles. He became the first lucky loser to reach the final in Adelaide's tournament history and the first to win an ATP Tour title since Marco Cecchinato in Budapest in 2018, and the tenth lucky loser champion overall.

After a six months hiatus, he returned to the 2023 US Open and the 2024 Australian Open using protected ranking.

=== 2025: Military hiatus ===
In December 2024, Kwon announced that he would step away from tennis and fulfill his mandatory military obligation, which began in January 2025.

Despite actively completing military service, Kwon was permitted to enter domestic tournaments and to represent the national team in select overseas events. As such he competed in a Davis Cup Qualifiers tie in Czechia, a South Korean national event, and the Busan Challenger.

=== 2026: Three Challenger titles ===
Entering the main-draw as a qualifier, Kwon won his fourth ATP Challenger title in Phan Thiết in January, defeating Ilia Simakin in the final. On home soil and playing in the tournament as a wildcard entrant, he won the Gwangju Open in April, overcoming August Holmgren in the final. The following month he defeated Bu Yunchaokete in the final at the Wuxi Open to claim his third Challenger title of the year. Kwon subsequently qualified for Wimbledon while still completing his mandatory military service. He defeated Martín Landaluce in the first round before losing to 21st seed Tommy Paul in the second round, in his final tournament before being discharged from military service on 12 July.

== Personal life ==
On May 22, 2023, it was confirmed that Kwon is dating singer Yubin of Wonder Girls. On October 5, 2023, Yubin's agency confirmed their break-up.

== National representation ==
Kwon has represented South Korea in the Davis Cup. He was first nominated to the team for the 2017 Davis Cup, making his debut against Uzbek tennis player Denis Istomin.

Kwon represented South Korea at the 2022 Davis Cup Finals and recorded his first victory over a top-20 player by defeating world No. 13, Félix Auger-Aliassime 7–6^{(5)}, 6–3 in the group stage tie versus Canada.

== Performance timelines ==
Key
W	F	SF	QF	#R	RR	Q#	P#	DNQ	A	Z#	PO	G	S	B	NMS	NTI	P	NH

(W) winner; (F) finalist; (SF) semifinalist; (QF) quarterfinalist; (#R) rounds 4, 3, 2, 1; (RR) round-robin stage; (Q#) qualification round; (P#) preliminary round; (DNQ) did not qualify; (A) absent; (Z#) Davis/Fed Cup Zonal Group (with number indication) or (PO) play-off; (G) gold, (S) silver or (B) bronze Olympic/Paralympic medal; (NMS) not a Masters tournament; (NTI) not a Tier I tournament; (P) postponed; (NH) not held; (SR) strike rate (events won / competed); (W–L) win–loss record.
To avoid confusion and double counting, these charts are updated at the conclusion of a tournament or when the player's participation has ended.

=== Singles ===
Current through the 2026 Wimbledon Championships.

Tournament	2017	2018	2019	2020	2021	2022	2023	2024	2025	2026	SR	W–L
Grand Slam tournaments
Australian Open	A	1R	Q1	1R	1R	2R	1R	1R	A	A	0 / 6	1–6
French Open	A	A	Q1	1R	3R	1R	A	2R	A	A	0 / 4	3–4
Wimbledon	Q1	A	1R	NH	2R	1R	A	1R	A	2R	0 / 5	2–5
US Open	Q1	A	1R	2R	1R	2R	1R	1R	A	Q1	0 / 6	2–6
Win–loss	0–0	0–1	0–2	1–3	3–4	2–4	0–2	1–4	0–0	1–1	0 / 21	8–21
ATP World Tour Masters 1000
Indian Wells Masters	A	A	A	NH	1R	1R	A	Q1	A	A	0 / 2	0–2
Miami Open	A	A	A	NH	1R	1R	A	2R	A	A	0 / 3	1–3
Monte-Carlo Masters	A	A	A	NH	A	Q1	A	A	A	A	0 / 0	0–0
Madrid Open	A	A	A	NH	A	1R	A	A	A	A	0 / 1	0–1
Italian Open	A	A	A	Q1	A	Q1	A	A	A	A	0 / 0	0–0
Canadian Open	A	A	1R	NH	A	Q2	A	A	A		0 / 1	0–1
Cincinnati Masters	A	A	A	Q2	Q1	Q1	A	A	A		0 / 0	0–0
Shanghai Masters	A	A	A	Not Held			A	A	A		0 / 0	0–0
Paris Masters	A	A	A	A	A	A	A	A	A		0 / 0	0–0
Win–loss	0–0	0–0	0–1	0–0	0–2	0–3	0–0	1–1	0–0	0–0	0 / 7	1–7
National representation
Davis Cup	Z1	Z1	Z1	A	WG1	RR	RR	WG1	Q1		0 / 2	13–10
Career statistics
	2017	2018	2019	2020	2021	2022	2023	2024	2025	2026	Career	
Tournaments	0	1	7	7	16	22	6	6	0	1	65	
Titles / Finals	0 / 0	0 / 0	0 / 0	0 / 0	1 / 1	0 / 0	1 / 1	0 / 0	0 / 0	0 / 0	2 / 2	
Overall win–loss	3–1	0–2	7–7	8–7	19–15	20–24	7–9	3–7	1–1	3–1	71–74	
Win %	75%	0%	50%	53%	56%	45%	44%	30%	50%	75%	48.97%	
Year-end ranking	168	235	88	95	53	83	196	348	486			

=== Doubles ===
Current through the 2022 Korea Open.

Tournament	2018	2019	2020	2021	2022	SR	W–L
Grand Slam tournaments
Australian Open	A	A	1R	A	3R	0 / 2	2–2
French Open	A	A	1R	A	1R	0 / 2	0–2
Wimbledon	A	A	NH	A	1R	0 / 1	0–1
US Open	A	A	A	1R	1R	0 / 2	0–2
Win–loss	0–0	0–0	0–2	0–1	2–4	0 / 7	2–7
National representation
Davis Cup	Z1	A	A	A	A	0 / 0	0–1
Career statistics
	2018	2019	2020	2021	2022	Career	
Tournaments	1	2	2	1	7	13	
Titles / Finals	0 / 0	0 / 0	0 / 0	0 / 0	0 / 0	0 / 0	
Overall win–loss	0–1	2–2	0–2	0–1	5–7	7–13	
Year-end ranking	0	280	342	851	232	35%	

== ATP Tour finals ==
=== Singles: 2 (2 titles) ===
Legend Grand Slam (0–0) ATP Masters 1000 (0–0) ATP 500 (0–0) ATP 250 (2–0)	Finals by surface Hard (2–0) Clay (0–0) Grass (0–0)	Finals by setting Outdoor (1–0) Indoor (1–0)

Result	W–L	Date	Tournament	Tier	Surface	Opponent	Score
Win	1–0	Sep 2021	Astana Open, Kazakhstan	ATP 250	Hard (i)	(Australia) James Duckworth	7–6^{(8–6)}, 6–3
Win	2–0	Jan 2023	Adelaide International 2, Australia	ATP 250	Hard	(Spain) Roberto Bautista Agut	6–4, 3–6, 7–6^{(7–4)}

== Records ==
- These records were attained in the Open era of tennis.

Tournament	Year	Record accomplished	Player tied
Adelaide International	2023	Winning an ATP tournament as lucky loser	Heinz Günthardt; Bill Scanlon; Francisco Clavet; Christian Miniussi; Sergiy Stakhovsky; Rajeev Ram; Leonardo Mayer; Andrey Rublev; Marco Cecchinato

== Davis Cup ==
Legend
Group membership
World Group (0)
Group I (7–3)
Group II (0)
Group III (0)
Group IV (0)

- ▲ ▼ indicates the outcome of the Davis Cup match followed by the score, date, place of event, the zonal classification and its phase, and the court surface.

Rubber outcome	Rubber	Match type (partner if any)	Opponent nation	Opponent player(s)	Score
▼1–3; 3–5 February 2017; Gimcheon Sports Town Tennis Courts, Gimcheon, South Korea; Group I Asia/Oceania First round; Hard surface
Defeat	IV	Singles	Uzbekistan	Denis Istomin	6–3, 6–7^{(5–7)}, 2–6, 6–7^{(12–14)}
▼2–3; 7–9 April 2017; ASB Tennis Arena, Auckland, New Zealand; Group I Asia/Oceania First round play-offs; Hard surface
Victory	II	Singles	New Zealand	Michael Venus	6–2, 6–2, 7–6^{(7–1)}
Victory	IV	Singles	New Zealand	José Statham	6–3, 6–2, 6–4
▲2–3; 15–17 September 2017; Yang Gu Tennis Park, Yang Gu, South Korea; Group I Asia/Oceania Second round play-offs; Hard surface
Victory	II	Singles	Chinese Taipei	Jason Jung	6–3, 6–4, 2–6, 7–6^{(7–4)}
▼0–4; 2–3 February 2018; Pakistan Sports Complex, Islamabad, Pakistan; Group I Asia/Oceania First round; Grass surface
Defeat	I	Singles	Pakistan	Aisam-ul-Haq Qureshi	3–6, 6–1, 6–7^{(6–8)}
Defeat	III	Doubles (with Lim Yong-kyu)	Pakistan	Aqeel Khan Aisam-ul-Haq Qureshi	6–7^{(8–10)}, 4–6
▲3–1; 14–15 September 2019; Guiyang Olympic Sports Center Tennis Stadium, Guiyang, China; Group I Asia/Oceania; Hard surface
Victory	I	Singles	China	Zhang Zhizhen	7–6^{(7–4)}, 6–7^{(4–7)}, 7–5
Victory	IV	Singles	China	Bai Yan	6–4, 6–3
▲3–1; 17–18 September 2021; The International Tennis Hall of Fame, Newport, USA; World Group I; Grass surface
Victory	II	Singles	New Zealand	Finn Reynolds	7–6^{(7–1)}, 6–3
Victory	IV	Singles	New Zealand	Rubin Statham	6–3, 6–3

== ATP Challenger Tour finals ==
=== Singles: 9 (6 titles, 3 runner-ups) ===
Legend ATP Challenger Tour (6–3)	Finals by surface Hard (6–3) Clay (0–0) Grass (0–0) Carpet (0–0)

Result	W–L	Date	Tournament	Tier	Surface	Opponent	Score
Loss	0–1	Mar 2017	Yokohama, Japan	Challenger	Hard	(Japan) Yūichi Sugita	4–6, 6–2, 6–7^{(2–7)}
Loss	0–2	May 2017	Seoul, South Korea	Challenger	Hard	(Italy) Thomas Fabbiano	6–1, 4–6, 3–6
Loss	0–3	Sep 2018	Kaohsiung, Taiwan	Challenger	Hard (i)	(France) Gaël Monfils	4–6, 6–2, 1–6
Win	1–3	Mar 2019	Yokohama, Japan	Challenger	Hard	(Germany) Oscar Otte	7–6, 6–3
Win	2–3	May 2019	Seoul, South Korea	Challenger	Hard	(Australia) Max Purcell	7–5, 7–5
Win	3–3	Feb 2021	Biella II, Italy	Challenger	Hard (i)	(Italy) Lorenzo Musetti	6–2, 6–3
Win	4–3	Jan 2026	Phan Thiết, Vietnam	Challenger	Hard	Ilia Simakin	6–2, 7–6^{(7–5)}
Win	5–3	Apr 2026	Gwangju, South Korea	Challenger	Hard	(Denmark) August Holmgren	6–4, 7–5
Win	6–3	May 2026	Wuxi, China	Challenger	Hard	(China) Bu Yunchaokete	6–2, 7–6^{(7–2)}

=== Doubles: 1 (1 runner-up) ===
Legend ATP Challenger Tour (0–1)

Result	W–L	Date	Tournament	Tier	Surface	Partner	Opponents	Score
Loss	0–1	Jun 2019	Surbiton, United Kingdom	Challenger	Grass	(India) Ramkumar Ramanathan	(Spain) Marcel Granollers (Japan) Ben McLachlan	6–4, 3–6, [2–10]

== ITF Futures finals ==
=== Singles: 9 (8–1) ===
Legend ITF Futures (8–1)	Finals by surface Hard (8–1) Clay (0–0) Grass (0–0) Carpet (0–0)

Result	W–L	Date	Tournament	Tier	Surface	Opponent	Score
Win	1–0	Nov 2015	Cambodia F1, Phnom Penh	Futures	Hard	(South Korea) Son Ji-hoon	7–5, 6–1
Win	2–0	Dec 2015	Cambodia F2, Phnom Penh	Futures	Hard	(Chinese Taipei) Huang Liang-chi	6–3, 6–3
Win	3–0	Mar 2016	Japan F2, Nishitokyo	Futures	Hard	(Japan) Yuya Kibi	6–3, 6–4
Win	4–0	Jul 2016	Korea F5, Gimcheon	Futures	Hard	(South Korea) Cho Min-hyeok	6–4, 6–4
Win	5–0	Dec 2016	Thailand F5, Hua Hin	Futures	Hard	(Germany) Daniel Altmaier	6–2, 6–2
Win	6–0	May 2025	M15 Andong, South Korea	WTT	Hard	(South Korea) Shin Sanhui	6–3, 6–1
Win	7–0	Jun 2025	M25 Changwon, South Korea	WTT	Hard	(South Korea) Shin Sanhui	6–1, 6–2
Win	8–0	Aug 2025	M15 Nakhon Pathom, Thailand	WTT	Hard	(Japan) Kaichi Uchida	6–2, 6–2
Loss	8–1	Aug 2025	M25 Taipei, Chinese Taipei	WTT	Hard	(Australia) Dane Sweeny	2–6, 0–3 ret.

=== Doubles: 5 (2 titles, 3 runner-ups) ===
Legend ITF Futures (2–3)	Finals by surface Hard (1–3) Clay (1–0) Grass (0–0) Carpet (0–0)

Result	W–L	Date	Tournament	Tier	Surface	Partner	Opponents	Score
Win	1–0	Sep 2015	Korea F6, Anseong	Futures	Clay (i)	(South Korea) Son Ji-hoon	(South Korea) Noh Sang-woo (South Korea) Nam Ji-sung	6–7^{(4–7)}, 6–3, [13–11]
Loss	1–1	Nov 2015	Cambodia F1, Phnom Penh	Futures	Hard	(South Korea) Son Ji-hoon	(Chinese Taipei) Liu Shao-fan (Chinese Taipei) Lee Kuan-yi	7–6^{(8–6)}, 4–6, [11–13]
Win	2–1	Mar 2016	Japan F2, Nishitokyo	Futures	Hard	(South Korea) Chung Yun-seong	(Japan) Issei Okamura (Japan) Kento Takeuchi	2–6, 6–2, [10–3]
Loss	2–2	Dec 2016	Thailand F5, Hua Hin	Futures	Hard	(South Korea) Lee Jea-moon	(France) Sadio Doumbia (France) Fabien Reboul	3–6, 4–6
Loss	2–3	Jun 2018	Korea F3, Daegu	Futures	Hard	(South Korea) Lim Yong-kyu	(South Korea) Chung Yun-seong (South Korea) Hong Seong-chan	walkover

== ITF Junior Circuit ==
=== Singles: 5 (4 titles, 1 runner-up) ===
Legend
Category GA (0–0)
Category G1 (0–0)
Category G2 (0–0)
Category G3 (1–0)
Category G4 (0–0)
Category G5 (3–1)

Result	W–L	Date	Tournament	Category	Surface	Opponent	Score
Loss	0–1	Apr 2013	2013 Gimcheon International Junior Championships, South Korea	G5	Hard	(South Korea) Chung Yun-seong	4–6, 3–6
Win	1–1	Apr 2014	2014 Gimcheon International Junior Championships, South Korea	G5	Hard	(South Korea) Shin San-hui	6–3, 6–0
Win	2–1	Sep 2014	China Junior 15 Guangzhou, China	G3	Hard	(Australia) Daniel Nolan	6–1, 6–2
Win	3–1	Apr 2015	2015 ITF Sunchang International Junior Championships, South Korea	G5	Hard	(United States) Christopher Yun	5–1 ret.
Win	4–1	Apr 2015	2015 Gimcheon International Junior Championships, South Korea	G5	Hard	(South Korea) Im Seong-taek	6–1, 6–2

=== Doubles: 6 (3 titles, 3 runners-up) ===
Legend
Category GA (0–0)
Category G1 (0–1)
Category G2 (0–1)
Category G3 (0–0)
Category G4 (2–0)
Category G5 (1–1)

Result	W–L	Date	Tournament	Category	Surface	Partner	Opponents	Score
Loss	0–1	Jun 2012	2012 Gimcheon International Junior Championships, South Korea	G5	Hard	(South Korea) Kim Young-seok	(South Korea) Hong Seong-chan (South Korea) Kang Ku-keon	3–6, 2–6
Win	1–1	Apr 2013	2013 Jeju International Junior Championships, South Korea	G4	Hard	(South Korea) Oh Chan-yeong	(South Korea) Han Jin-sung (South Korea) Hyun Geong-hwan	6–3, 6–2
Win	2–1	Apr 2013	2013 Sunchang International Junior Championships, South Korea	G5	Hard	(South Korea) Oh Chan-yeong	(South Korea) Lee Min-hyun (South Korea) Shin San-hui	6–4, 3–6, [10–1]
Win	3–1	Apr 2014	2014 Jeju International Junior Championships, South Korea	G4	Hard	(South Korea) Go Hyun-sik	(South Korea) Lim Min-seob (South Korea) Shin San-hui	6–4, 7–5
Loss	3–2	Nov 2014	2014 Lee Duk Hee Cup Chuncheon International Junior Tennis Championships, South Korea	G2	Hard	(South Korea) Oh Chan-yeong	(Australia) Jake Delaney (Japan) Akira Santillan	6–3, 3–6, [8–10]
Loss	3–3	Nov 2014	2014 Seogwipo Asia Oceania International Junior Tennis Championships, South Korea	G1	Hard	(South Korea) Shin San-hui	(Japan) Shohei Chikami (Japan) Yosuke Watanuki	3–6, 4–6
