= 2022 Yokkaichi Challenger – Doubles =

Doubles
- 2022 Yokkaichi Challenger

Final
- Champions: (Chinese Taipei) Hsu Yu-hsiou (Japan) Yuta Shimizu
- Runners-up: (Japan) Masamichi Imamura (Japan) Rio Noguchi
- Score: 7–6^{(7–2)}, 6–4

Events
Singles	Doubles
← 2019 ·	Yokkaichi Challenger	· 2023 →

Nam Ji-sung and Song Min-kyu were the defending champions but chose not to defend their title.

Hsu Yu-hsiou and Yuta Shimizu won the title after defeating Masamichi Imamura and Rio Noguchi 7–6^{(7–2)}, 6–4 in the final.

== Seeds ==
1. (India) Arjun Kadhe / (India) Ramkumar Ramanathan (first round)
2. (Romania) Victor Vlad Cornea / (Australia) Andrew Harris (quarterfinals)
3. (Philippines) Ruben Gonzales / (Indonesia) Christopher Rungkat (first round)
4. (South Korea) Chung Yun-seong / (Japan) Kaichi Uchida (semifinals, withdrew)

== Draw ==
=== Key ===
- Q = Qualifier
- WC = Wild card
- LL = Lucky loser
- Alt = Alternate
- ITF = ITF entry
- PR = Protected ranking
- SR = Special ranking
- SE = Special exempt
- JE = Junior exempt
- JR = Junior Accelerator Programme entrant
- CO = College Accelerator Programme entrant
- NG = Next Gen Accelerator Program entrant
- w/o = Walkover
- r = Retired
- d = Defaulted

First round
1	(India) A Kadhe (India) R Ramanathan	5	5
(Japan) T Matsui (Japan) K Uesugi	7	7
(Romania) ND Ionel (Romania) FC Jianu	6	7^{7}
WC	(Japan) T Ichikawa (Japan) Koki Matsuda	1	6^{5}
3	(Philippines) R Gonzales (Indonesia) C Rungkat	3	2
(Japan) M Imamura (Japan) R Noguchi	6	6
(Japan) Yuki Mochizuki (Japan) Makoto Ochi	6	6^{3}	[16]
(Northern Mariana Islands) C Sinclair (Australia) J Taylor	2	7^{7}	[14]
(Philippines) FC Alcantara (Japan) S Watanabe	4	1
(Japan) S Hazawa (Japan) J Trotter	6	6
(Chinese Taipei) T-h Huang (Japan) Rimpei Kawakami	5	5
4	(South Korea) Y-s Chung (Japan) K Uchida	7	7
(Chinese Taipei) Y-h Hsu (Japan) Y Shimizu	6	7
(Japan) S Mochizuki (Japan) T Yuzuki	1	5
WC	(Japan) Ryuki Tsutsumi (Japan) Asahi Yamanaka	1	1
2	(Romania) VV Cornea (Australia) A Harris	6	6

Quarterfinals
(Japan) T Matsui (Japan) K Uesugi	6^{4}	3
(Romania) ND Ionel (Romania) FC Jianu	7^{7}	6
(Japan) M Imamura (Japan) R Noguchi	7	7^{7}
(Japan) Y Mochizuki (Japan) M Ochi	5	6^{5}
(Japan) S Hazawa (Japan) J Trotter	7^{7}	6^{3}	[3]
4	(South Korea) Y-s Chung (Japan) K Uchida	6^{5}	7^{7}	[10]
(Chinese Taipei) Y-h Hsu (Japan) Y Shimizu	6	3	[10]
2	(Romania) VV Cornea (Australia) A Harris	1	6	[2]

Semifinals
(Romania) ND Ionel (Romania) FC Jianu	6^{3}	3
(Japan) M Imamura (Japan) R Noguchi	7^{7}	6
4	(South Korea) Y-s Chung (Japan) K Uchida
(Chinese Taipei) Y-h Hsu (Japan) Y Shimizu	w/o

Final
(Japan) M Imamura (Japan) R Noguchi	6^{2}	4
(Chinese Taipei) Y-h Hsu (Japan) Y Shimizu	7^{7}	6
