= 2026 Yokkaichi Challenger – Singles =

Singles
- 2026 Yokkaichi Challenger

Final
- Champion: (Japan) Rio Noguchi
- Runner-up: (Japan) Yasutaka Uchiyama
- Score: 5–7, 7–6^{(7–5)}, 6–3

Events
Singles	Doubles
- Yokkaichi Challenger

Rei Sakamoto was the defending champion but chose not to defend his title.

Rio Noguchi won the title after defeating Yasutaka Uchiyama 5–7, 7–6^{(7–5)}, 6–3 in the final.

== Seeds ==
1. (Japan) Sho Shimabukuro (first round)
2. (Denmark) August Holmgren (second round)
3. (France) Dan Added (second round)
4. (Chinese Taipei) Hsu Yu-hsiou (second round)
5. (China) Zhou Yi (first round)
6. (Japan) Kaichi Uchida (first round)
7. (Japan) Rio Noguchi (champion)
8. (Australia) James McCabe (second round)

== Draw ==
Key

- Q = Qualifier
- WC = Wild card
- LL = Lucky loser
- Alt = Alternate
- ITF = ITF entry
- PR = Protected ranking
- SR = Special ranking
- SE = Special exempt
- JE = Junior exempt
- JR = Junior Accelerator Programme entrant
- CO = College Accelerator Programme entrant
- NG = Next Gen Accelerator Program entrant
- w/o = Walkover
- r = Retired
- d = Defaulted

=== Finals ===
Semifinals
7	(Japan) Rio Noguchi	6	2	6
(United Kingdom) Harry Wendelken	4	6	4
(Japan) Yasutaka Uchiyama	6	5	6
(Japan) Hayato Matsuoka	4	7	4

Final
7	(Japan) Rio Noguchi	5	7^{7}	6
(Japan) Yasutaka Uchiyama	7	6^{5}	3

=== Top half ===
First round
1/WC	(Japan) S Shimabukuro	1	4
WC	(Japan) Naoya Honda	6	6
(United Kingdom) L Broady	6	6
(Japan) J Trotter	1	1
Alt	(Australia) L Tu	7	7^{7}
Q	(Denmark) CE Overbeck	5	6^{3}
(Chinese Taipei) T-l Wu	3	3
7	(Japan) R Noguchi	6	6
4	(Chinese Taipei) Y-h Hsu	7	6
Q	(Canada) J Boulais	5	3
(Japan) Y Shimizu	2	6	6
Q	(China) J Cui	6	0	4
Q	(Thailand) K Samrej	5	0
(United Kingdom) P Jubb	7	6
(United Kingdom) H Wendelken	6	4	6
5	(China) Y Zhou	1	6	1

Second round
WC	(Japan) N Honda	1	1
(United Kingdom) L Broady	6	6
Alt	(Australia) L Tu	6	0	5
7	(Japan) R Noguchi	4	6	7
4	(Chinese Taipei) Y-h Hsu	5	6	1
(Japan) Y Shimizu	7	3	6
(United Kingdom) P Jubb	2	6	6^{4}
(United Kingdom) H Wendelken	6	4	7^{7}

Quarterfinals
(United Kingdom) L Broady	1	3
7	(Japan) R Noguchi	6	6
(Japan) Y Shimizu	3	4
(United Kingdom) H Wendelken	6	6

Semifinals
7	(Japan) R Noguchi	6	2	6
(United Kingdom) H Wendelken	4	6	4

=== Bottom half ===
First round
6	(Japan) K Uchida	4	2
Q	(China) F Sun	6	6
(South Korea) Shin San-hui	4	1
Q	(Japan) M Imamura	6	6
(Thailand) M Jones	4	6	4
(Japan) Y Uchiyama	6	4	6
WC	(Japan) K Isomura	4	2
3	(France) D Added	6	6
8	(Australia) J McCabe	6	7^{11}
(United States) Andre Ilagan	4	6^{9}
(Japan) H Matsuoka	6	5	6
NG	(Serbia) O Milić	4	7	4
PR	(Australia) B Ellis	2	0
(South Korea) S-w Kwon	6	6
(Japan) Renta Tokuda	3	6	3
2	(Denmark) A Holmgren	6	3	6

Second round
Q	(China) F Sun	3	6	6
Q	(Japan) M Imamura	6	3	4
(Japan) Y Uchiyama	6	6
3	(France) D Added	2	2
8	(Australia) J McCabe	5	4
(Japan) H Matsuoka	7	6
(South Korea) S-w Kwon	7	6
2	(Denmark) A Holmgren	5	3

Quarterfinals
Q	(China) F Sun	1	2
(Japan) Y Uchiyama	6	6
(Japan) H Matsuoka	4	6	4
(South Korea) S-w Kwon	6	2	2^{r}

Semifinals
(Japan) Y Uchiyama	6	5	6
(Japan) H Matsuoka	4	7	4
