= 2024 Yokkaichi Challenger – Doubles =

Doubles
- 2024 Yokkaichi Challenger

Final
- Champions: (Australia) Thomas Fancutt (Switzerland) Jakub Paul
- Runners-up: (Japan) Kokoro Isomura (Japan) Hikaru Shiraishi
- Score: 6–2, 7–5

Events
Singles	Doubles
- Yokkaichi Challenger

Evan King and Reese Stalder were the defending champions but chose not to defend their title.

Thomas Fancutt and Jakub Paul won the title after defeating Kokoro Isomura and Hikaru Shiraishi 6–2, 7–5 in the final.

== Seeds ==
1. (South Korea) Nam Ji-sung / (Australia) Matthew Romios (quarterfinals)
2. (Australia) Thomas Fancutt / (Switzerland) Jakub Paul (champions)
3. (Australia) Blake Bayldon / (United Kingdom) Marcus Willis (first round)
4. (Peru) Alexander Merino / (Germany) Christoph Negritu (quarterfinals)

== Draw ==
Key

- Q = Qualifier
- WC = Wild card
- LL = Lucky loser
- Alt = Alternate
- ITF = ITF entry
- PR = Protected ranking
- SR = Special ranking
- SE = Special exempt
- JE = Junior exempt
- JR = Junior Accelerator Programme entrant
- CO = College Accelerator Programme entrant
- NG = Next Gen Accelerator Program entrant
- w/o = Walkover
- r = Retired
- d = Defaulted

=== Draw ===
First round
1	(South Korea) J-s Nam (Australia) MC Romios	7^{10}	6
(Japan) Ryuki Matsuda (Canada) K Stevenson	6^{8}	3
WC	(Japan) Lennon Roark Jones (Japan) Shogo Sanada	6^{5}	6^{5}
(South Africa) P Henning (South Africa) Kris van Wyk	7^{7}	7^{7}
3	(Australia) B Bayldon (United Kingdom) M Willis	4	7^{7}	[6]
(Japan) S Hazawa (Japan) Ryotaro Taguchi	6	6^{4}	[10]
(Japan) K Isomura (Japan) Hikaru Shiraishi	6	6
P Bar Biryukov (Japan) Keisuke Saitoh	2	2
WC	(Japan) S Mochizuki (Japan) R Sakamoto	6	6
Alt	(Japan) Naoya Honda (Japan) H Matsuoka	1	4
(Japan) M Imamura (Japan) K Uchida	6	2	[8]
4	(Peru) A Merino (Germany) C Negritu	4	6	[10]
(Chinese Taipei) T-h Huang (Chinese Taipei) T-l Wu	2	6	[9]
(Japan) Y Kusuhara (Japan) S Nakagawa	6	3	[11]
(United States) A Ayeni (Japan) Takuya Kumasaka	2	6^{4}
2	(Australia) T Fancutt (Switzerland) J Paul	6	7^{7}

Quarterfinals
1	(South Korea) J-s Nam (Australia) MC Romios	6	2	[10]
(South Africa) P Henning (South Africa) K van Wyk	4	6	[12]
(Japan) S Hazawa (Japan) R Taguchi	6^{13}	2
(Japan) K Isomura (Japan) H Shiraishi	7^{15}	6
WC	(Japan) S Mochizuki (Japan) R Sakamoto	3	7^{7}	[10]
4	(Peru) A Merino (Germany) C Negritu	6	6^{3}	[7]
(Japan) Y Kusuhara (Japan) S Nakagawa	7	4	[8]
2	(Australia) T Fancutt (Switzerland) J Paul	5	6	[10]

Semifinals
(South Africa) P Henning (South Africa) K van Wyk	4	2
(Japan) K Isomura (Japan) H Shiraishi	6	6
WC	(Japan) S Mochizuki (Japan) R Sakamoto
2	(Australia) T Fancutt (Switzerland) J Paul	w/o

Final
(Japan) K Isomura (Japan) H Shiraishi	2	5
2	(Australia) T Fancutt (Switzerland) J Paul	6	7
