= 2023 Yokkaichi Challenger – Singles =

Singles
- 2023 Yokkaichi Challenger

Final
- Champion: (Belgium) Zizou Bergs
- Runner-up: (United States) Michael Mmoh
- Score: 6–2, 7–6^{(7–2)}

Events
Singles	Doubles
← 2022 ·	Yokkaichi Challenger	· 2024 →

Yosuke Watanuki was the defending champion but lost in the second round to Giovanni Fonio.

Zizou Bergs won the title after defeating Michael Mmoh 6–2, 7–6^{(7–2)} in the final.

== Seeds ==
1. (Japan) Yosuke Watanuki (second round)
2. (Austria) Jurij Rodionov (first round)
3. (United States) Michael Mmoh (final)
4. (Belgium) Zizou Bergs (champion)
5. (Australia) Marc Polmans (semifinals)
6. (Czech Republic) Zdeněk Kolář (second round)
7. (Switzerland) Leandro Riedi (first round)
8. (Chinese Taipei) Hsu Yu-hsiou (first round)

== Draw ==
Key

- Q = Qualifier
- WC = Wild card
- LL = Lucky loser
- Alt = Alternate
- ITF = ITF entry
- PR = Protected ranking
- SR = Special ranking
- SE = Special exempt
- JE = Junior exempt
- JR = Junior Accelerator Programme entrant
- CO = College Accelerator Programme entrant
- NG = Next Gen Accelerator Program entrant
- w/o = Walkover
- r = Retired
- d = Defaulted

=== Finals ===
Semifinals
5	(Australia) Marc Polmans	5	4
4	(Belgium) Zizou Bergs	7	6
3	(United States) Michael Mmoh	6	6
(Hong Kong) Coleman Wong	2	2

Final
4	(Belgium) Zizou Bergs	6	7^{7}
3	(United States) Michael Mmoh	2	6^{2}

=== Top half ===
First round
1	(Japan) Y Watanuki	6	6
(Japan) Y Shimizu	3	4
(Italy) G Fonio	4	7^{7}	7^{7}
(North Macedonia) K Ivanovski	6	6^{5}	6^{5}
(Turkey) C İlkel	4	5
(Tunisia) M Echargui	6	7
WC	(Japan) R Noguchi	3	4
5	(Australia) M Polmans	6	6
4	(Belgium) Z Bergs	5	6	6
(Turkey) A Çelikbilek	7	2	4
(Japan) K Uchida	7^{8}	2	6
Q	(South Korea) J-s Nam	6^{6}	6	1
(South Korea) S-c Hong	7^{9}	4	2
(Australia) O Jasika	6^{7}	6	6
Q	(Japan) J Trotter	7^{7}	6
8	(Chinese Taipei) Y-h Hsu	6^{5}	2

Second round
1	(Japan) Y Watanuki	6	2	5
(Italy) G Fonio	3	6	7
(Tunisia) M Echargui	7	2	2
5	(Australia) M Polmans	5	6	6
4	(Belgium) Z Bergs	6	6
(Japan) K Uchida	4	3
(Australia) O Jasika	6	2	4
Q	(Japan) J Trotter	2	6	6

Quarterfinals
(Italy) G Fonio	1	7^{8}	2
5	(Australia) M Polmans	6	6^{6}	6
4	(Belgium) Z Bergs	6	7
Q	(Japan) J Trotter	3	5

Semifinals
5	(Australia) M Polmans	5	4
4	(Belgium) Z Bergs	7	6

=== Bottom half ===
First round
7	(Switzerland) L Riedi	2	2
(Australia) L Tu	6	6
LL	(Japan) Yuki Mochizuki	0	4
(France) G Blancaneaux	6	6
Q	(Japan) H Moriya	6	6
Q	(Japan) T Ito	3	2
WC	(Japan) Renta Tokuda	2	3
3	(United States) M Mmoh	6	6
6	(Czech Republic) Z Kolář	6	5	6
(France) Mathys Erhard	1	7	2
Q	(Japan) Y Takahashi	3	3
Q	(Denmark) A Holmgren	6	6
(Japan) N Nakagawa	2	7^{7}	4
(Hong Kong) C Wong	6	6^{5}	6
WC	(Japan) R Sakamoto	6	6
2	(Austria) J Rodionov	4	4

Second round
(Australia) L Tu	6	7^{8}
(France) G Blancaneaux	3	6^{6}
Q	(Japan) H Moriya	6^{4}	0
3	(United States) M Mmoh	7^{7}	6
6	(Czech Republic) Z Kolář	4	2
Q	(Denmark) A Holmgren	6	6
(Hong Kong) C Wong	6	6
WC	(Japan) R Sakamoto	3	2

Quarterfinals
(Australia) L Tu	3	3
3	(United States) M Mmoh	6	6
Q	(Denmark) A Holmgren	6	5	4
(Hong Kong) C Wong	4	7	6

Semifinals
3	(United States) M Mmoh	6	6
(Hong Kong) C Wong	2	2
