= 2022 Yokkaichi Challenger – Singles =

Singles
- 2022 Yokkaichi Challenger

Final
- Champion: (Japan) Yosuke Watanuki
- Runner-up: (Portugal) Frederico Ferreira Silva
- Score: 6–2, 6–2

Events
Singles	Doubles
← 2019 ·	Yokkaichi Challenger	· 2023 →

Yūichi Sugita was the defending champion but lost in the second round to Colin Sinclair.

Yosuke Watanuki won the title after defeating Frederico Ferreira Silva 6–2, 6–2 in the final.

== Seeds ==
1. (Japan) Kaichi Uchida (semifinals)
2. (Australia) James Duckworth (semifinals)
3. (Japan) Yosuke Watanuki (champion)
4. (Japan) Rio Noguchi (first round)
5. (Chinese Taipei) Hsu Yu-hsiou (first round)
6. (Romania) Nicholas David Ionel (quarterfinals)
7. (Vietnam) Lý Hoàng Nam (second round)
8. (Australia) Dane Sweeny (first round)

== Draw ==
=== Key ===
- Q = Qualifier
- WC = Wild card
- LL = Lucky loser
- Alt = Alternate
- ITF = ITF entry
- PR = Protected ranking
- SR = Special ranking
- SE = Special exempt
- JE = Junior exempt
- JR = Junior Accelerator Programme entrant
- CO = College Accelerator Programme entrant
- NG = Next Gen Accelerator Program entrant
- w/o = Walkover
- r = Retired
- d = Defaulted

=== Finals ===
Semifinals
1	(Japan) Kaichi Uchida	2	2
(Portugal) Frederico Ferreira Silva	6	6
3	(Japan) Yosuke Watanuki	7^{7}	6
2	(Australia) James Duckworth	6^{3}	3

Final
(Portugal) Frederico Ferreira Silva	2	2
3	(Japan) Yosuke Watanuki	6	6

=== Top half ===
First round
1	(Japan) K Uchida	6	1	6
(India) P Gunneswaran	3	6	3
WC	(Japan) S Hazawa	7	6
(Japan) H Moriya	5	1
(Japan) S Shimabukuro	6	6
Q	(Japan) Shuichi Sekiguchi	4	3
LL	(Japan) J Trotter	3	1
7	(Vietnam) NH Lý	6	6
4	(Japan) R Noguchi	4	6	1
PR	(Japan) Y Sugita	6	1	6
(India) R Ramanathan	2	2
Q	(Northern Mariana Islands) C Sinclair	6	6
(Japan) S Mochizuki	6	6
Q	(Japan) Yuki Mochizuki	1	1
(Portugal) F Ferreira Silva	6	2	6
5	(Chinese Taipei) Y-h Hsu	2	6	2

Second round
1	(Japan) K Uchida	6	6
WC	(Japan) S Hazawa	3	4
(Japan) S Shimabukuro	6	6
7	(Vietnam) NH Lý	2	3
PR	(Japan) Y Sugita	4	3
Q	(Northern Mariana Islands) C Sinclair	6	6
(Japan) S Mochizuki	6	1	3
(Portugal) F Ferreira Silva	3	6	6

Quarterfinals
1	(Japan) K Uchida	4	6	7
(Japan) S Shimabukuro	6	2	5
Q	(Northern Mariana Islands) C Sinclair	2	6	3
(Portugal) F Ferreira Silva	6	3	6

Semifinals
1	(Japan) K Uchida	2	2
(Portugal) F Ferreira Silva	6	6

=== Bottom half ===
First round
8	(Australia) D Sweeny	5	2
(South Korea) Y-s Chung	7	6
WC	(Japan) N Nakagawa	3	6^{4}
(India) M Sasikumar	6	7^{7}
(Kazakhstan) B Zhukayev	6	6
(Japan) Y Shimizu	1	4
(Czech Republic) Z Kolář	2	4
3	(Japan) Yo Watanuki	6	6
6	(Romania) ND Ionel	6	7^{7}
(Croatia) N Serdarušić	4	6^{1}
Q	(Japan) Keisuke Saitoh	4	0
WC	(Japan) Shintaro Imai	6	6
(Romania) FC Jianu	1
Q	(South Korea) D-h Lee	0^{r}
Q	(Japan) Makoto Ochi	6^{2}	4
2	(Australia) J Duckworth	7^{7}	6

Second round
(South Korea) Y-s Chung	6	6
(India) M Sasikumar	1	4
(Kazakhstan) B Zhukayev	0	1^{r}
3	(Japan) Yo Watanuki	6	4
6	(Romania) ND Ionel	6	6
WC	(Japan) S Imai	4	4
(Romania) FC Jianu	7^{7}	2	2
2	(Australia) J Duckworth	6^{4}	6	6

Quarterfinals
(South Korea) Y-s Chung	2	2^{r}
3	(Japan) Yo Watanuki	6	5
6	(Romania) ND Ionel	6	3	3
2	(Australia) J Duckworth	4	6	6

Semifinals
3	(Japan) Yo Watanuki	7^{7}	6
2	(Australia) J Duckworth	6^{3}	3
