= 2024 Yokkaichi Challenger – Singles =

Singles
- 2024 Yokkaichi Challenger

Final
- Champion: (Japan) Rei Sakamoto
- Runner-up: (Germany) Christoph Negritu
- Score: 1–6, 6–3, 6–4

Events
Singles	Doubles
- Yokkaichi Challenger

Zizou Bergs was the defending champion but chose not to defend his title.

Rei Sakamoto won the title after defeating Christoph Negritu 1–6, 6–3, 6–4 in the final.

== Seeds ==
1. (Japan) Yoshihito Nishioka (second round, withdrew)
2. (Italy) Mattia Bellucci (first round)
3. (Japan) Yasutaka Uchiyama (withdrew)
4. (Hong Kong) Coleman Wong (second round)
5. (Australia) Omar Jasika (second round)
6. (Australia) Li Tu (quarterfinals)
7. (Japan) Sho Shimabukuro (second round)
8. (Japan) Yuta Shimizu (quarterfinals)
9. (Chinese Taipei) Hsu Yu-hsiou (withdrew)

== Draw ==
Key

- Q = Qualifier
- WC = Wild card
- LL = Lucky loser
- Alt = Alternate
- ITF = ITF entry
- PR = Protected ranking
- SR = Special ranking
- SE = Special exempt
- JE = Junior exempt
- JR = Junior Accelerator Programme entrant
- CO = College Accelerator Programme entrant
- NG = Next Gen Accelerator Program entrant
- w/o = Walkover
- r = Retired
- d = Defaulted

=== Finals ===
Semifinals
(Japan) Shintaro Mochizuki	2	6	4
WC	(Japan) Rei Sakamoto	6	4	6
(Australia) Philip Sekulic	0	7^{8}	6^{r}
Q	(Germany) Christoph Negritu	6	6^{6}	6

Final
WC	(Japan) Rei Sakamoto	1	6	6
Q	(Germany) Christoph Negritu	6	3	4

=== Top half ===
First round
1	(Japan) Y Nishioka	6	6
Q	(Japan) H Moriya	4	3
(Japan) S Mochizuki	7	6
(Australia) J McCabe	5	4
(Sweden) E Ymer	7^{7}	6
A Zakharov	6^{5}	4
WC	(Japan) Yua Taka	2	3
6	(Australia) L Tu	6	6
Q	(South Africa) P Henning	4	3
WC	(Japan) R Sakamoto	6	6
(Australia) D Sweeny	6^{10}	2
Alt	(Japan) N Nakagawa	7^{12}	6
(Japan) K Uchida	6	6
WC	(Japan) K Isomura	0	1
Q	(Japan) Ryotaro Taguchi	4	1
7	(Japan) S Shimabukuro	6	6

Second round
1	(Japan) Y Nishioka
(Japan) S Mochizuki	w/o
(Sweden) E Ymer	4	6	4
6	(Australia) L Tu	6	3	6
WC	(Japan) R Sakamoto	7^{11}	6
Alt	(Japan) N Nakagawa	6^{9}	3
(Japan) K Uchida	2	6	6
7	(Japan) S Shimabukuro	6	4	2

Quarterfinals
(Japan) S Mochizuki	6	1	6
6	(Australia) L Tu	4	6	4
WC	(Japan) R Sakamoto	6	7^{7}
(Japan) K Uchida	4	6^{3}

Semifinals
(Japan) S Mochizuki	2	6	4
WC	(Japan) R Sakamoto	6	4	6

=== Bottom half ===
First round
8	(Japan) Y Shimizu	7	6
LL	(United States) A Ayeni	5	3
LL	P Bar Biryukov	7^{7}	7^{10}
Y Demin	6^{3}	6^{8}
Q	(Japan) Y Takahashi	3	2
(Australia) P Sekulic	6	6
(Japan) M Imamura	6	5	4
4	(Hong Kong) C Wong	2	7	6
5	(Australia) O Jasika	6	6
(South Africa) Kris van Wyk	1	2
(Lebanon) B Hassan	6	5	6
Q	(Switzerland) J Paul	3	7	2
(Chinese Taipei) T-l Wu	4	3
(Italy) F Cinà	6	6
Q	(Germany) C Negritu	6^{1}	6	7
2	(Italy) M Bellucci	7^{7}	2	5

Second round
8	(Japan) Y Shimizu	3	6	6
LL	P Bar Biryukov	6	3	4
(Australia) P Sekulic	6	2	6
4	(Hong Kong) C Wong	3	6	4
5	(Australia) O Jasika	4	6	4
(Lebanon) B Hassan	6	0	6
(Italy) F Cinà	5	2
Q	(Germany) C Negritu	7	6

Quarterfinals
8	(Japan) Y Shimizu	3	1
(Australia) P Sekulic	6	6
(Lebanon) B Hassan	1^{r}
Q	(Germany) C Negritu	4

Semifinals
(Australia) P Sekulic	0	7^{8}	6^{r}
Q	(Germany) C Negritu	6	6^{6}	6
