= 2026 Yokkaichi Challenger – Doubles =

Doubles
- 2026 Yokkaichi Challenger

Final
- Champions: (China) Sun Fajing (Chinese Taipei) Wu Tung-lin
- Runners-up: (Australia) Ethan Cook (Australia) Tai Sach
- Score: 7–6^{(8–6)}, 6–3

Events
Singles	Doubles
- Yokkaichi Challenger

Thomas Fancutt and Jakub Paul were the defending champions but chose not to defend their title.

Sun Fajing and Wu Tung-lin won the title after defeating Ethan Cook and Tai Sach 7–6^{(8–6)}, 6–3 in the final.

== Seeds ==
1. (Chinese Taipei) Hsu Yu-hsiou / (Chinese Taipei) Huang Tsung-hao (first round)
2. (South Korea) Nam Ji-sung / (South Korea) Park Ui-sung (first round)
3. (India) Jeevan Nedunchezhiyan / (India) Ramkumar Ramanathan (first round)
4. (Chinese Taipei) Jason Jung / (Japan) Kaito Uesugi (first round)

== Draw ==
Key

- Q = Qualifier
- WC = Wild card
- LL = Lucky loser
- Alt = Alternate
- ITF = ITF entry
- PR = Protected ranking
- SR = Special ranking
- SE = Special exempt
- JE = Junior exempt
- JR = Junior Accelerator Programme entrant
- CO = College Accelerator Programme entrant
- NG = Next Gen Accelerator Program entrant
- w/o = Walkover
- r = Retired
- d = Defaulted

First round
1	(Chinese Taipei) Y-h Hsu (Chinese Taipei) T-h Huang	2	2
(Japan) Y Shimizu (Japan) J Trotter	6	6
WC	(Japan) Seiya Mizuno (Japan) Shion Motoyama	7	2	[10]
(Japan) R Noguchi (South Korea) Shin San-hui	5	6	[5]
3	(India) J Nedunchezhiyan (India) R Ramanathan	7^{8}	3	[5]
(Thailand) M Jones (Japan) K Uchida	6^{6}	6	[10]
WC	(Japan) T Matsui (Japan) Y Uchiyama	3	4
(Australia) Ethan Cook (Australia) Tai Sach	6	6
(United Kingdom) L Broady (United Kingdom) H Wendelken	4	7	[5]
(China) F Sun (Chinese Taipei) T-l Wu	6	5	[10]
(Japan) M Imamura (Japan) Ryuki Matsuda	4	7^{7}	[10]
4	(Chinese Taipei) J Jung (Japan) K Uesugi	6	6^{4}	[8]
(Canada) J Boulais (Finland) P Niklas-Salminen	6	7^{7}
(France) D Added (Japan) N Tajima	2	6^{4}
(Japan) Y Kusuhara (Japan) S Nakagawa	4	7	[10]
2	(South Korea) J-s Nam (South Korea) U-s Park	6	5	[6]

Quarterfinals
(Japan) Y Shimizu (Japan) J Trotter	6	6
WC	(Japan) S Mizuno (Japan) S Motoyama	1	2
(Thailand) M Jones (Japan) K Uchida	3	6^{5}
(Australia) E Cook (Australia) T Sach	6	7^{7}
(China) F Sun (Chinese Taipei) T-l Wu	6	6
(Japan) M Imamura (Japan) R Matsuda	4	0
(Canada) J Boulais (Finland) P Niklas-Salminen	7^{7}	6
(Japan) Y Kusuhara (Japan) S Nakagawa	6^{3}	4

Semifinals
(Japan) Y Shimizu (Japan) J Trotter	4	6	[7]
(Australia) E Cook (Australia) T Sach	6	1	[10]
(China) F Sun (Chinese Taipei) T-l Wu	6^{1}	6	[16]
(Canada) J Boulais (Finland) P Niklas-Salminen	7^{7}	4	[14]

Final
(Australia) E Cook (Australia) T Sach	6^{6}	3
(China) F Sun (Chinese Taipei) T-l Wu	7^{8}	6
