= 2023 Yokkaichi Challenger =

- Date: 27 November – 3 December
- Edition: 3rd
- Location: Yokkaichi, Japan

Champions

Singles
- (Belgium) Zizou Bergs

Doubles
- (United States) Evan King / (United States) Reese Stalder
← 2022 ·	Yokkaichi Challenger	· 2024 →

The 2023 Yokkaichi Challenger was a professional tennis tournament played on hard courts. It was the 3rd edition of the tournament which was part of the 2023 ATP Challenger Tour. It took place in Yokkaichi, Japan between 27 November and 3 December 2023.

== Singles main-draw entrants ==
=== Seeds ===
Country	Player	Rank^{1}	Seed
JPN	Yosuke Watanuki	98	1
AUT	Jurij Rodionov	110	2
USA	Michael Mmoh	122	3
BEL	Zizou Bergs	152	4
AUS	Marc Polmans	163	5
CZE	Zdeněk Kolář	181	6
SUI	Leandro Riedi	208	7
TPE	Hsu Yu-hsiou	210	8

- ^{1} Rankings are as of 20 November 2023.

=== Other entrants ===
The following players received wildcards into the singles main draw:

- (Japan) Rio Noguchi
- (Japan) Rei Sakamoto
- (Japan) Renta Tokuda

The following players received entry from the qualifying draw:

- (Denmark) August Holmgren
- (Japan) Tatsuma Ito
- (Japan) Hiroki Moriya
- (South Korea) Nam Ji-sung
- (Japan) Yusuke Takahashi
- (Japan) James Trotter

The following player received entry as a lucky loser:

- (Japan) Yuki Mochizuki

== Champions ==
=== Singles ===
- (Belgium) Zizou Bergs def. (United States) Michael Mmoh 6–2, 7–6^{(7–2)}.

=== Doubles ===
- (United States) Evan King / (United States) Reese Stalder def. (Chinese Taipei) Ray Ho / (Australia) Calum Puttergill 7–5, 6–4.
