= 2026 Yokkaichi Challenger =

- Date: 23 – 29 March
- Edition: 5th
- Location: Yokkaichi, Japan

Champions

Singles
- (Japan) Rio Noguchi

Doubles
- (China) Sun Fajing / (Chinese Taipei) Wu Tung-lin
- Yokkaichi Challenger

The 2026 Yokkaichi Challenger was a professional tennis tournament played on hard courts. It was the 5th edition of the tournament which was part of the 2026 ATP Challenger Tour. It took place in Yokkaichi, Japan between 23 and 29 March 2026.

== Singles main-draw entrants ==
=== Seeds ===
Country	Player	Rank^{1}	Seed
JPN	Sho Shimabukuro	110	1
DEN	August Holmgren	197	2
FRA	Dan Added	204	3
TPE	Hsu Yu-hsiou	215	4
CHN	Zhou Yi	221	5
JPN	Kaichi Uchida	236	6
JPN	Rio Noguchi	245	7
AUS	James McCabe	246	8

- ^{1} Rankings are as of 16 March 2026.

=== Other entrants ===
The following players received wildcards into the singles main draw:

- (Japan) Naoya Honda
- (Japan) Kokoro Isomura
- (Japan) Sho Shimabukuro

The following player received entry into the singles main draw using a protected ranking:

- (Australia) Blake Ellis

The following player received entry into the singles main draw through the Junior Accelerator programme:

- (United States) ~~Benjamin Willwerth~~

The following player received entry into the singles main draw through the Next Gen Accelerator programme:

- (Serbia) Ognjen Milić

The following player received entry into the singles main draw as an alternate:

- (Australia) Li Tu

The following players received entry from the qualifying draw:

- (Canada) Justin Boulais
- (China) Cui Jie
- (Japan) Masamichi Imamura
- (Denmark) Carl Emil Overbeck
- (Thailand) Kasidit Samrej
- (China) Sun Fajing

== Champions ==
=== Singles ===
- (Japan) Rio Noguchi def. (Japan) Yasutaka Uchiyama 5–7, 7–6^{(7–5)}, 6–3.

=== Doubles ===
- (China) Sun Fajing / (Chinese Taipei) Wu Tung-lin def. (Australia) Ethan Cook / (Australia) Tai Sach 7–6^{(8–6)}, 6–3.
