= 2025 Keio Challenger – Men's singles =

Men's singles
- 2025 Keio Challenger

Final
- Champion: (Japan) Rei Sakamoto
- Runner-up: (Japan) Kaichi Uchida
- Score: 4–6, 7–6^{(7–4)}, 6–4

Events
Singles	men	women
Doubles	men	women
- Keio Challenger

Yuta Shimizu was the defending champion but lost in the second round to Yusuke Kusuhara.

Rei Sakamoto won the title after defeating Kaichi Uchida 4–6, 7–6^{(7–4)}, 6–4 in the final.

== Seeds ==
1. (Japan) Kei Nishikori (quarterfinals)
2. (Japan) Rei Sakamoto (champion)
3. (Sweden) Elias Ymer (first round, retired)
4. (United Kingdom) Oliver Crawford (first round)
5. (Chinese Taipei) Hsu Yu-hsiou (first round)
6. (Japan) Yuta Shimizu (second round)
7. (Japan) Yasutaka Uchiyama (quarterfinals)
8. (Japan) Kaichi Uchida (final)

== Draw ==
Key

- Q = Qualifier
- WC = Wild card
- LL = Lucky loser
- Alt = Alternate
- ITF = ITF entry
- PR = Protected ranking
- SR = Special ranking
- SE = Special exempt
- JE = Junior exempt
- JR = Junior Accelerator Programme entrant
- CO = College Accelerator Programme entrant
- NG = Next Gen Accelerator Program entrant
- w/o = Walkover
- r = Retired
- d = Defaulted

=== Finals ===
Semifinals
8	(Japan) Kaichi Uchida	6	6
Q	(Brazil) Igor Marcondes	4	2
(Japan) Akira Santillan	6	1	3
2	(Japan) Rei Sakamoto	3	6	6

Final
8	(Japan) Kaichi Uchida	6	6^{4}	4
2	(Japan) Rei Sakamoto	4	7^{7}	6

=== Top half ===
First round
1	(Japan) K Nishikori	4	6	6
Q	(Japan) T Ichikawa	6	1	1
WC	(Japan) Lennon Roark Jones	6	1	2
(South Korea) Shin San-hui	3	6	6
(Thailand) M Jones	6^{3}	2
Q	(Japan) Ryotaro Taguchi	7^{7}	6
(South Korea) H Chung	3	0
8	(Japan) K Uchida	6	6
4	(United Kingdom) O Crawford	4	4
Q	(Brazil) I Marcondes	6	6
Q	(Japan) Jumpei Yamasaki	4	6^{5}
(Japan) Yuki Mochizuki	6	7^{7}
(United Kingdom) M Basing	6	2	3
(Japan) Hikaru Shiraishi	2	6	6
(Austria) N Oberleitner	7	6
5	(Chinese Taipei) Y-h Hsu	5	2

Second round
1	(Japan) K Nishikori	6	6
(South Korea) S-h Shin	4	1
Q	(Japan) R Taguchi	5	4
8	(Japan) K Uchida	7	6
Q	(Brazil) I Marcondes	6	7^{7}
(Japan) Y Mochizuki	2	6^{5}
(Japan) H Shiraishi	5	6	3
(Austria) N Oberleitner	7	4	6

Quarterfinals
1	(Japan) K Nishikori	2	2
8	(Japan) K Uchida	6	6
Q	(Brazil) I Marcondes	6	6
(Austria) N Oberleitner	1	3

Semifinals
8	(Japan) K Uchida	6	6
Q	(Brazil) I Marcondes	4	2

=== Bottom half ===
First round
6	(Japan) Y Shimizu	6	6
(Japan) Y Takahashi	2	2
(Japan) K Isomura	5	3
Q	(Japan) Y Kusuhara	7	6
(Japan) A Santillan	6	6
WC	(Japan) M Imamura	0	2
JR	(United States) K Bigun	3
3	(Sweden) E Ymer	0^{r}
7	(Japan) Y Uchiyama	6	7^{13}
(Chinese Taipei) T-h Huang	4	6^{11}
(South Korea) Shin Woo-bin	3	3
Q	(Czech Republic) M Vrbenský	6	6
Maxim Zhukov	6	6
WC	(Japan) Ryo Tabata	4	4
(Thailand) K Samrej	4	6^{1}
2	(Japan) R Sakamoto	6	7^{7}

Second round
6	(Japan) Y Shimizu	3	3
Q	(Japan) Y Kusuhara	6	6
(Japan) A Santillan	6	6
JR	(United States) K Bigun	3	1
7	(Japan) Y Uchiyama	6	6
Q	(Czech Republic) M Vrbenský	3	3
M Zhukov	1	2
2	(Japan) R Sakamoto	6	6

Quarterfinals
Q	(Japan) Y Kusuhara	3	2
(Japan) A Santillan	6	6
7	(Japan) Y Uchiyama	6	3	4
2	(Japan) R Sakamoto	3	6	6

Semifinals
(Japan) A Santillan	6	1	3
2	(Japan) R Sakamoto	3	6	6
