= 2019 Yokkaichi Challenger – Singles =

Singles
- 2019 Yokkaichi Challenger

Final
- Champion: (Japan) Yūichi Sugita
- Runner-up: (Australia) James Duckworth
- Score: 3–6, 6–3, 7–6^{(7–1)}

Events
| Singles | Doubles |
- Yokkaichi Challenger

This was the first edition of the tournament.

Yūichi Sugita won the title after defeating James Duckworth 3–6, 6–3, 7–6^{(7–1)} in the final.

== Seeds ==
All seeds receive a bye into the second round.

1. (Japan) Yasutaka Uchiyama (second round)
2. (Australia) James Duckworth (final)
3. (Japan) Tatsuma Ito (semifinals)
4. (South Korea) Chung Hyeon (quarterfinals, withdrew)
5. (Japan) Yūichi Sugita (champion)
6. (China) Zhang Ze (second round)
7. (Japan) Hiroki Moriya (third round)
8. (South Korea) Chung Yun-seong (third round)
9. (India) Saketh Myneni (quarterfinals)
10. (Chinese Taipei) Wu Tung-lin (quarterfinals)
11. (South Korea) Nam Ji-sung (quarterfinals)
12. (Chinese Taipei) Yang Tsung-hua (third round)
13. (Japan) Makoto Ochi (second round)
14. (Japan) Yusuke Takahashi (third round)
15. (Japan) Renta Tokuda (second round)
16. (Vietnam) Lý Hoàng Nam (second round)

== Draw ==
Key

- Q = Qualifier
- WC = Wild card
- LL = Lucky loser
- Alt = Alternate
- ITF = ITF entry
- PR = Protected ranking
- SR = Special ranking
- SE = Special exempt
- JE = Junior exempt
- JR = Junior Accelerator Programme entrant
- CO = College Accelerator Programme entrant
- NG = Next Gen Accelerator Program entrant
- w/o = Walkover
- r = Retired
- d = Defaulted

=== Finals ===
Quarterfinals
ITF | (Japan) Sho Shimabukuro | 6^{1} | 6 | 6
11 | (South Korea) Nam Ji-sung | 7^{7} | 3 | 2
4 | (South Korea) Chung Hyeon
5 | (Japan) Yūichi Sugita | w/o
9 | (India) Saketh Myneni | 6^{5} | 1
3 | (Japan) Tatsuma Ito | 7^{7} | 6
10 | (Chinese Taipei) Wu Tung-lin | 3 | 1
2 | (Australia) James Duckworth | 6 | 6

Semifinals
ITF | (Japan) Sho Shimabukuro | 5 | 3
5 | (Japan) Yūichi Sugita | 7 | 6
3 | (Japan) Tatsuma Ito | 3 | 4
2 | (Australia) James Duckworth | 6 | 6

Final
5 | (Japan) Yūichi Sugita | 3 | 6 | 7^{7}
2 | (Australia) James Duckworth | 6 | 3 | 6^{1}

=== Top half ===
==== Section 1 ====
First round
ITF | (Japan) S Shimabukuro | 6 | 6
ITF | (Japan) Yuki Mochizuki | 4 | 2
(Japan) T Matsui | 6 | 7^{15}
Alt | (United States) JP Fruttero | 3 | 6^{13}
ITF | (Japan) Jumpei Yamasaki | 6 | 6
(Australia) B Ellis | 4 | 4
(United States) E Zhu | 6^{4} | 5
(Thailand) W Trongcharoenchaikul | 7^{7} | 4^{r}

Second round
1 | (Japan) Y Uchiyama | 6^{7} | 7^{7} | 3
ITF | (Japan) S Shimabukuro | 7^{9} | 6^{4} | 6
(Japan) T Matsui | 7^{7} | 7^{7}
13 | (Japan) Makoto Ochi | 6^{5} | 6^{4}
11 | (South Korea) J-s Nam | 6 | 6
ITF | (Japan) J Yamasaki | 3 | 2
(United States) E Zhu | 6^{5} | 6^{5}
7 | (Japan) H Moriya | 7^{7} | 7^{7}

Third round
ITF | (Japan) S Shimabukuro | 6 | 1
(Japan) T Matsui | 4 | 0^{r}
11 | (South Korea) J-s Nam | 6 | 5 | 7^{7}
7 | (Japan) H Moriya | 2 | 7 | 6^{1}

Quarterfinals
ITF | (Japan) S Shimabukuro | 6^{1} | 6 | 6
11 | (South Korea) J-s Nam | 7^{7} | 3 | 2

==== Section 2 ====
First round
(Australia) M Romios | 6^{4} | 6 | 6
ITF | (Zimbabwe) B Lock | 7^{7} | 2 | 2
Alt | (Zimbabwe) CJ Lock | 2 | 2
(Japan) Kazuki Nishiwaki | 6 | 6
(Japan) Y Shimizu | 6 | 6
(South Korea) M-k Song | 3 | 3
WC | (Japan) Yuya Ito | 6 | 6
(Australia) H Bourchier | 3 | 3

Second round
4 | (South Korea) Hy Chung | 6 | 6
(Australia) M Romios | 3 | 1
(Japan) K Nishiwaki | 5 | 6 | 3
14 | (Japan) Y Takahashi | 7 | 3 | 6
12 | (Chinese Taipei) T-h Yang | 1 | 6 | 6
(Japan) Y Shimizu | 6 | 1 | 4
WC | (Japan) Y Ito | 3 | 6 | 2
5 | (Japan) Y Sugita | 6 | 3 | 6

Third round
4 | (South Korea) Hy Chung | 3 | 6 | 6
14 | (Japan) Y Takahashi | 6 | 1 | 4
12 | (Chinese Taipei) T-h Yang | 3 | 1
5 | (Japan) Y Sugita | 6 | 6

Quarterfinals
4 | (South Korea) Hy Chung
5 | (Japan) Y Sugita | w/o

=== Bottom half ===
==== Section 3 ====
First round
(Australia) D Kelly | 6^{2} | 0^{r}
(United States) A Ayeni | 7^{7} | 0
(Japan) Kazuma Kawachi | 6 | 4 | 0^{r}
WC | (Japan) Yasunori Hashikawa | 2 | 6 | 4
WC | (Japan) S Hazawa | 6 | 6
(Australia) T Fancutt | 4 | 1
(Japan) Sora Fukuda | 4 | 3
ITF | (Japan) K Takeuchi | 6 | 6

Second round
8 | (South Korea) Y-s Chung | 7^{7} | 6
(United States) A Ayeni | 6^{1} | 3
WC | (Japan) Y Hashikawa | 2 | 6^{4}
9 | (India) S Myneni | 6 | 7^{7}
15 | (Japan) Renta Tokuda | 6 | 6^{7} | 0
WC | (Japan) S Hazawa | 4 | 7^{9} | 6
ITF | (Japan) K Takeuchi | 6^{5} | 1
3 | (Japan) T Ito | 7^{7} | 6

Third round
8 | (South Korea) Y-s Chung | 3 | 6 | 3
9 | (India) S Myneni | 6 | 3 | 6
WC | (Japan) S Hazawa | 0 | 3
3 | (Japan) T Ito | 6 | 6

Quarterfinals
9 | (India) S Myneni | 6^{5} | 1
3 | (Japan) T Ito | 7^{7} | 6

==== Section 4 ====
First round
(Japan) Kosuke Ogura | 1 | 3
(Japan) Shuichi Sekiguchi | 6 | 6
(Japan) Issei Okamura | 3 | 3
(China) J Cui | 6 | 6
(Japan) Shintaro Imai | 6 | 6
(Japan) N Tajima | 2 | 3
(Japan) Ren Nakamura | 1 | 2
(Monaco) L Catarina | 6 | 6

Second round
6 | (China) Ze Zhang | 6 | 6^{5} | 5
(Japan) S Sekiguchi | 3 | 7^{7} | 7
(China) J Cui | 3 | 6^{1}
10 | (Chinese Taipei) T-l Wu | 6 | 7^{7}
16 | (Vietnam) NH Lý | 6 | 2 | 3
(Japan) S Imai | 2 | 6 | 6
(Monaco) L Catarina | 1 | 3
2 | (Australia) J Duckworth | 6 | 6

Third round
(Japan) S Sekiguchi | 4 | 0^{r}
10 | (Chinese Taipei) T-l Wu | 6 | 0
(Japan) S Imai | 2 | 3
2 | (Australia) J Duckworth | 6 | 6

Quarterfinals
10 | (Chinese Taipei) T-l Wu | 3 | 1
2 | (Australia) J Duckworth | 6 | 6
