= 2025 Keio Challenger =

- Date: 17 – 23 November (men's); 24 – 30 November (women's)
- Edition: 18th (men's); 8th (women's)
- Category: ATP Challenger Tour; ITF Women's World Tennis Tour
- Surface: Hard
- Location: Yokohama, Japan

Champions

Men's singles
- (Japan) Rei Sakamoto

Women's singles
- (China) Zhang Shuai

Men's doubles
- (Austria) Neil Oberleitner / (Czech Republic) Michael Vrbenský

Women's doubles
- (China) Dang Yiming / (China) You Xiaodi
- Keio Challenger

The 2025 Yokohama Keio Challenger was a professional tennis tournament played on hardcourts. It was the 18th (men's) and 8th (women's) editions of the tournament and part of the 2025 ATP Challenger Tour and the 2025 ITF Women's World Tennis Tour. It took place in Yokohama, Japan between 17 and 30 November 2025.

== Men's singles main-draw entrants ==
=== Seeds ===
Country	Player	Rank^{1}	Seed
JPN	Kei Nishikori	159	1
JPN	Rei Sakamoto	180	2
SWE	Elias Ymer	191	3
GBR	Oliver Crawford	193	4
TPE	Hsu Yu-hsiou	220	5
JPN	Yuta Shimizu	249	6
JPN	Yasutaka Uchiyama	305	7
JPN	Kaichi Uchida	309	8

- ^{1} Rankings are as of 10 November 2025.

=== Other entrants ===
The following players received wildcards into the singles main draw:

- (Japan) Masamichi Imamura
- (Japan) Lennon Roark Jones
- (Japan) Ryo Tabata

The following player received entry into the singles main draw through the Junior Accelerator programme:

- (United States) Kaylan Bigun

The following players received entry from the qualifying draw:

- (Japan) Taisei Ichikawa
- (Japan) Yusuke Kusuhara
- (Brazil) Igor Marcondes
- (Japan) Ryotaro Taguchi
- (Czech Republic) Michael Vrbenský
- (Japan) Jumpei Yamasaki

== Women's singles main-draw entrants ==
=== Seeds ===
Country	Player	Rank^{1}	Seed
CHN	Zhang Shuai	102	1
THA	Mananchaya Sawangkaew	222	2
CHN	Ma Yexin	227	3
USA	Hina Inoue	232	4
KOR	Ku Yeon-woo	255	5
USA	Hanna Chang	273	6
JPN	Haruka Kaji	277	7
CHN	You Xiaodi	290	8

- ^{1} Rankings are as of 17 November 2025.

=== Other entrants ===
The following players received wildcards into the singles main draw:

- (Japan) Yuno Kitahara
- (Japan) Anri Nagata
- (Japan) Yuka Naito
- (Japan) Naho Sato

The following player received entry into the singles main draw using a special ranking:

- Darya Astakhova

The following players received entry from the qualifying draw:

- (Japan) Mayuka Aikawa
- (Japan) Ena Koike
- Jana Kolodynska
- (Japan) Rinko Matsuda
- Kristiana Sidorova
- (China) Wang Yuhan
- (Hong Kong) Cody Wong
- (China) Zhang Ying

== Champions ==
=== Men's singles ===
- (Japan) Rei Sakamoto def. (Japan) Kaichi Uchida 4–6, 7–6^{(7–4)}, 6–4.

=== Women's singles ===
- (China) Zhang Shuai def. (South Korea) Ku Yeon-woo 6–3, 6–2.

=== Men's doubles ===
- (Austria) Neil Oberleitner / (Czech Republic) Michael Vrbenský def. (Japan) Masamichi Imamura / (Japan) Ryuki Matsuda 7–6^{(8–6)}, 6–1.

=== Women's doubles ===
- (China) Dang Yiming / (China) You Xiaodi def. (Japan) Natsumi Kawaguchi / (Japan) Hayu Kinoshita 2–6, 6–3, [10–4].
