= 2026 US Open – Men's singles =

Tennis championship

Men's singles
- 2026 US Open

Final
- Champion: (Germany) Alexander Zverev
- Runner-up: (United States) Ben Shelton
- Score: 6–3, 7–6^{(7–2)}, 5–7, 6–2
- Date: September 13, 2026

Details
- Draw: 128 (16Q / 8WC)
- Seeds: 32

Events
Singles	men	women		boys	girls
Doubles	men	women	mixed	boys	girls
WC Singles	men	women	quad	boys	girls
WC Doubles	men	women	quad	boys	girls

Qualification
Singles	men	women
- US Open

Alexander Zverev defeated Ben Shelton in the final, 6–3, 7–6^{(7–2)}, 5–7, 6–2 to win the men's singles tennis title at the 2026 US Open. It was his second major title, following the 2026 French Open. Zverev was the fourth man in the Open Era to win his first two majors in the same year (after Jimmy Connors in 1974, Guillermo Vilas in 1977, and Jannik Sinner in 2024), and the first German man to win the US Open since Boris Becker in 1989.

Carlos Alcaraz was the defending champion, but lost in the quarterfinals to Shelton. Their quarterfinal match marked the latest finish in tournament history, at 3:33 a.m., surpassing the previous record from the 2022 quarterfinal between Alcaraz and Sinner.

Novak Djokovic's first-round defeat to Mariano Navone marked only his third career loss in the opening round of a major, his first opening-round loss at the US Open, and his earliest loss at a major since the 2006 Australian Open. This marked the first time that none of the Big Three reached the second round of a major since the 2003 French Open. As a result of his loss, Djokovic dropped out of the top 10 in the ATP rankings for the first time since July 2018, marking the first time since October 2002 in which none of the Big Three were ranked in the top 10.

Arthur Géa was the first lucky loser to reach the fourth round since Corentin Moutet in 2022, and the second to do so in the Open Era. With his win over 12th seed Rafael Jódar, Bu Yunchaokete became the first lucky loser to defeat a top 15 seed in the first round of the US Open in the Open Era.

This tournament marked the first absence from a major of world No. 1 Sinner, since making his major debut at the 2019 US Open. It was the first time the reigning world No. 1 did not participate at the US Open.

This tournament marked the final major appearance of 2016 champion, three-time major champion and former world No. 3 Stan Wawrinka, and the final professional appearance of former world No. 6 Gaël Monfils. Wawrinka lost in the first round to Matteo Berrettini, while Monfils lost in the second round to Learner Tien.

== Seeds ==
1. (Germany) Alexander Zverev (champion)
2. (Spain) Carlos Alcaraz (quarterfinals)
3. (Canada) Félix Auger-Aliassime (second round)
4. (Serbia) Novak Djokovic (first round)
5. (Italy) Flavio Cobolli (third round)
6. (Australia) Alex de Minaur (second round)
7. Daniil Medvedev (fourth round)
8. (United States) Ben Shelton (final)
9. (United States) Taylor Fritz (third round)
10. (France) Arthur Fils (first round)
11. (United States) Frances Tiafoe (semifinals)
12. (Spain) Rafael Jódar (first round)
13. (Italy) Lorenzo Musetti (second round)
14. (United States) Learner Tien (fourth round)
15. (Kazakhstan) Alexander Bublik (third round)
16. (United States) Brandon Nakashima (second round)
17. (Czech Republic) Jakub Menšík (third round)
18. (Czech Republic) Jiří Lehečka (third round)
19. (Norway) Casper Ruud (withdrew)
20. (United States) Tommy Paul (fourth round)
21. (Italy) Luciano Darderi (fourth round)
22. (Monaco) Valentin Vacherot (third round)
23. Andrey Rublev (second round)
24. (Argentina) Francisco Cerúndolo (fourth round)
25. (Chile) Alejandro Tabilo (third round)
26. (France) Arthur Rinderknech (third round)
27. (Argentina) Tomás Martín Etcheverry (fourth round)
28. (Belgium) Alexander Blockx (quarterfinals, retired)
29. (United Kingdom) Cameron Norrie (first round)
30. (Italy) Matteo Arnaldi (first round)
31. (Belgium) Zizou Bergs (third round)
32. (Peru) Ignacio Buse (second round)

== Draw ==
Key

- Q = Qualifier
- WC = Wild card
- LL = Lucky loser
- Alt = Alternate
- ITF = ITF entry
- PR = Protected ranking
- SR = Special ranking
- SE = Special exempt
- JE = Junior exempt
- JR = Junior Accelerator Programme entrant
- CO = College Accelerator Programme entrant
- NG = Next Gen Accelerator Program entrant
- w/o = Walkover
- r = Retired
- d = Defaulted

=== Finals ===
Quarterfinals
1	(Germany) Alexander Zverev	6	7	6
(Netherlands) Botic van de Zandschulp	2	5	1
Karen Khachanov	6	7	3
28	(Belgium) Alexander Blockx	2	5	2^{r}
11	(United States) Frances Tiafoe	5	3	7	6	7^{10}
(United States) Alex Michelsen	7	6	5	3	6^{6}
8	(United States) Ben Shelton	6^{5}	6	6	1	7^{10}
2	(Spain) Carlos Alcaraz	7^{7}	1	3	6	6^{7}

Semifinals
1	(Germany) Alexander Zverev	6	7^{9}	7^{8}
Karen Khachanov	3	6^{7}	6^{6}
11	(United States) Frances Tiafoe	6	3	3	5
8	(United States) Ben Shelton	4	6	6	7

Final
1	(Germany) Alexander Zverev	6	7^{7}	5	6
8	(United States) Ben Shelton	3	6^{2}	7	2

=== Top half ===
==== Section 1 ====
First round
1	(Germany) A Zverev	6	3	6^{7}	7	6
(Italy) L Sonego	4	6	7^{9}	5	4
(France) Q Halys	6	7	6^{7}	6
(Argentina) F Díaz Acosta	4	5	7^{9}	1
Q	(Bulgaria) G Dimitrov	6	3	2	4
(Australia) A Popyrin	3	6	6	6
(Germany) Y Hanfmann	3	2	7^{9}	3
25	(Chile) A Tabilo	6	6	6^{7}	6
21	(Italy) L Darderi	6	3	6	7
Q	(United Kingdom) H Wendelken	2	6	2	5
Q	(Czech Republic) D Svrčina	6	6	5	5	6
(France) V Royer	4	3	7	7	2
WC	(Australia) D Sweeny	7^{7}	6	3
(France) C Moutet	6^{4}	4	0^{r}
(United Kingdom) A Fery	3	3	5
13	(Italy) L Musetti	6	6	7

Second round
1	(Germany) A Zverev	6	4	7^{7}	6^{3}	6
(France) Q Halys	4	6	6^{3}	7^{7}	3
(Australia) A Popyrin	6	6^{4}	6^{3}	2
25	(Chile) A Tabilo	2	7^{7}	7^{7}	6
21	(Italy) L Darderi	6	6^{5}	6	6
Q	(Czech Republic) D Svrčina	3	7^{7}	4	4
WC	(Australia) D Sweeny	3	6	6	6
13	(Italy) L Musetti	6	1	2	2

Third round
1	(Germany) A Zverev	6	7^{7}	6
25	(Chile) A Tabilo	2	6^{2}	2
21	(Italy) L Darderi	6	6	6
WC	(Australia) D Sweeny	4	3	3

Fourth round
1	(Germany) A Zverev	6	6	7^{7}
21	(Italy) L Darderi	2	2	6^{3}

==== Section 2 ====
First round
12	(Spain) R Jódar	2	1	1
LL	(China) Y Bu	6	6	6
(Hungary) F Marozsán	4	4	2
WC	(United States) M Zheng	6	6	6
(United States) Z Svajda	6	6	6^{5}	6
(Germany) D Altmaier	3	1	7^{7}	2
(Argentina) JM Cerúndolo	3	6	6	3	1
LL	(France) A Géa	6	2	3	6	6
31	(Belgium) Z Bergs	6	3	6	6
PR	(Spain) C Taberner	3	6	2	2
(Netherlands) J de Jong	2	6	4	6	6
Q	(Italy) F Passaro	6	2	6	3	2
(United Kingdom) J Choinski	3	1	6^{5}
(Netherlands) B van de Zandschulp	6	6	7^{7}
Q	(Italy) A Guerrieri	2	2	4
6	(Australia) A de Minaur	6	6	6

Second round
LL	(China) Y Bu	3	6	2	3
WC	(United States) M Zheng	6	2	6	6
(United States) Z Svajda	7	3	2	2
LL	(France) A Géa	5	6	6	6
31	(Belgium) Z Bergs	7	1	6	7^{7}
(Netherlands) J de Jong	5	6	2	6^{2}
(Netherlands) B van de Zandschulp	6	7	6
6	(Australia) A de Minaur	4	5	2

Third round
WC	(United States) M Zheng	6^{7}	6	6	3	2
LL	(France) A Géa	7^{9}	3	4	6	6
31	(Belgium) Z Bergs	6	6^{3}	6	6^{6}	3
(Netherlands) B van de Zandschulp	3	7^{7}	4	7^{8}	6

Fourth round
LL	(France) A Géa	6	7^{7}	6^{7}	6^{3}	4
(Netherlands) B van de Zandschulp	3	6^{0}	7^{9}	7^{7}	6

==== Section 3 ====
First round
3	(Canada) F Auger-Aliassime	7	4	6	7
(Australia) R Hijikata	5	6	3	5
(Argentina) RA Burruchaga	3	0	1
K Khachanov	6	6	6
(Slovakia) A Molčan	4	6	3	2
(France) B Bonzi	6	3	6	6
(United States) M Giron	6	3	3	7^{8}	1
32	(Peru) I Buse	3	6	6	6^{6}	6
17	(Czech Republic) J Menšík	6	6	7
LL	(Japan) S Mochizuki	1	4	5
Q	(Austria) J Rodionov	7^{7}	6	7^{7}
(France) G Mpetshi Perricard	6^{2}	0	6^{4}
(Paraguay) AD Vallejo	6	1	2	0
WC	(France) G Monfils	2	6	6	6
(Portugal) N Borges	4	1	2
14	(United States) L Tien	6	6	6

Second round
3	(Canada) F Auger-Aliassime	7^{7}	3	2	2
K Khachanov	6^{5}	6	6	6
(France) B Bonzi	6	7^{7}	6
32	(Peru) I Buse	2	6^{4}	0
17	(Czech Republic) J Menšík	6	3	6	6
Q	(Austria) J Rodionov	3	6	2	3
WC	(France) G Monfils	3	4	3
14	(United States) L Tien	6	6	6

Third round
K Khachanov	6	6	6
(France) B Bonzi	3	2	4
17	(Czech Republic) J Menšík	3	6	7^{7}	3	4
14	(United States) L Tien	6	1	6^{2}	6	6

Fourth round
K Khachanov	7	4	6^{6}	6	6
14	(United States) L Tien	5	6	7^{8}	1	4

==== Section 4 ====
First round
9	(United States) T Fritz	6	6	6
WC	(United States) D Blanch	3	2	4
(Italy) M Bellucci	6	6	6
Q	(Hungary) Z Piros	4	2	0
(Argentina) C Ugo Carabelli	4	3	3
(Germany) J-L Struff	6	6	6
PR	(Austria) F Misolic	4	3	5
24	(Argentina) F Cerúndolo	6	6	7
28	(Belgium) A Blockx	6	6	6
Q	(Chile) T Barrios Vera	3	4	2
PR	(China) J Shang	6	6^{5}	6	3	4
(Argentina) M Trungelliti	0	7^{7}	1	6	6
Q	(United States) N Basavareddy	6^{4}	6	3	4
Q	(Australia) T Schoolkate	7^{7}	3	6	6
(Argentina) F Comesaña	6	6	3	4	4
5	(Italy) F Cobolli	3	2	6	6	6

Second round
9	(United States) T Fritz	6	6	6
(Italy) M Bellucci	0	1	1
(Germany) J-L Struff	7	5	6	2	3
24	(Argentina) F Cerúndolo	5	7	4	6	6
28	(Belgium) A Blockx	6	6	3	6
(Argentina) M Trungelliti	3	2	6	1
Q	(Australia) T Schoolkate	6	3	4	5
5	(Italy) F Cobolli	3	6	6	7

Third round
9	(United States) T Fritz	6	6	3	4	4
24	(Argentina) F Cerúndolo	3	4	6	6	6
28	(Belgium) A Blockx	6^{4}	6	6	6
5	(Italy) F Cobolli	7^{7}	3	0	3

Fourth round
24	(Argentina) F Cerúndolo	3	6	5	5
28	(Belgium) A Blockx	6	4	7	7

=== Bottom half ===
==== Section 5 ====
First round
7	D Medvedev	6	6	6
Q	(France) H Gaston	4	2	4
WC	(United States) S Gorzny	3	6	3	6	7^{11}
(Belgium) R Collignon	6	3	6	3	6^{9}
(Spain) J Munar	6^{5}	3	6	7^{7}	7
(France) T Atmane	7^{7}	6	1	6^{4}	5
(Japan) S Shimabukuro	7^{7}	2	6^{4}	2
26	(France) A Rinderknech	6^{4}	6	7^{7}	6
22	(Monaco) V Vacherot	6	6	7
(United States) A Kovacevic	2	3	5
(Poland) K Majchrzak	6	6	6
(Serbia) H Medjedovic	3	3	3
(Australia) A Vukic	4	7^{7}	4	6	4
Q	(Japan) R Sakamoto	6	6^{5}	6	3	6
(United States) M Damm	4	6	6	3	4
11	(United States) F Tiafoe	6	4	3	6	6

Second round
7	D Medvedev	6	6	7
WC	(United States) S Gorzny	1	3	5
(Spain) J Munar	6^{4}	2	5
26	(France) A Rinderknech	7^{7}	6	7
22	(Monaco) V Vacherot	6	4	7^{7}	6
(Poland) K Majchrzak	4	6	6^{3}	2
Q	(Japan) R Sakamoto	3	6^{2}	5
11	(United States) F Tiafoe	6	7^{7}	7

Third round
7	D Medvedev	6	6	6
26	(France) A Rinderknech	4	4	4
22	(Monaco) V Vacherot	4	2	4
11	(United States) F Tiafoe	6	6	6

Fourth round
7	D Medvedev	6^{1}	4	6^{6}
11	(United States) F Tiafoe	7^{7}	6	7^{8}

==== Section 6 ====
First round
16	(United States) B Nakashima	6	6	6
(Argentina) S Báez	2	1	0
(United States) A Michelsen	6	6	6
Q	(Italy) F Cinà	4	1	0
(Spain) D Mérida	6	6	6
(Hungary) M Fucsovics	4	4	2
LL	(Finland) O Virtanen	7^{7}	7^{7}	0	2	6^{5}
23	A Rublev	6^{5}	6^{0}	6	6	7^{10}
27	(Argentina) TM Etcheverry	6	6	6
(Czech Republic) V Kopřiva	3	4	0
(Spain) M Landaluce	6	2	6	5	3
LL	(United Kingdom) J Fearnley	4	6	4	7	6
(Italy) M Berrettini	7^{7}	7^{7}	6
WC	(Switzerland) S Wawrinka	6^{4}	6^{3}	0
(Argentina) M Navone	7^{7}	5	4	6	6
4	(Serbia) N Djokovic	6^{5}	7	6	2	1

Second round
16	(United States) B Nakashima	3	4	4
(United States) A Michelsen	6	6	6
(Spain) D Mérida	6^{3}	6	6	6
23	A Rublev	7^{7}	2	4	4
27	(Argentina) TM Etcheverry	6	6	3	6
LL	(United Kingdom) J Fearnley	3	3	6	3
(Italy) M Berrettini	6	3	4	6^{4}
(Argentina) M Navone	3	6	6	7^{7}

Third round
(United States) A Michelsen	7^{7}	6	6
(Spain) D Mérida	6^{5}	4	3
27	(Argentina) TM Etcheverry	6	6	6
(Argentina) M Navone	4	4	3

Fourth round
(United States) A Michelsen	7^{8}	6	6
27	(Argentina) TM Etcheverry	6^{6}	4	4

==== Section 7 ====
First round
8	(United States) B Shelton	1	6	7^{7}	6
(Netherlands) T Griekspoor	6	1	6^{3}	2
(Bosnia and Herzegovina) D Džumhur	4	6	1	1
(Poland) H Hurkacz	6	4	6	6
(Serbia) M Kecmanović	4	6	4	1
(Canada) D Shapovalov	6	4	6	6
(France) L Van Assche	6^{6}	6	6	6
29	(United Kingdom) C Norrie	7^{8}	2	2	3
18	(Czech Republic) J Lehečka	6	7^{7}	4	6
(Spain) P Carreño Busta	1	6^{5}	6	2
Q	(United Kingdom) T Samuel	6	6	6
(Czech Republic) T Macháč	2	3	2
Q	(South Africa) L Harris	6	6	6
WC	(United States) J Kennedy	4	2	2
(Greece) S Tsitsipas	4	7^{7}	6	6
10	(France) A Fils	6	6^{3}	1	4

Second round
8	(United States) B Shelton	6	5	7^{7}	7
(Poland) H Hurkacz	3	7	6^{3}	5
(Canada) D Shapovalov	6	6	7^{9}
(France) L Van Assche	0	4	6^{7}
18	(Czech Republic) J Lehečka	6	6	6
Q	(United Kingdom) T Samuel	4	2	4
Q	(South Africa) L Harris	7^{7}	3	6^{4}	3
(Greece) S Tsitsipas	6^{1}	6	7^{7}	6

Third round
8	(United States) B Shelton	7^{7}	6^{5}	6	6
(Canada) D Shapovalov	6^{3}	7^{7}	3	4
18	(Czech Republic) J Lehečka	6	1	6^{3}	1
(Greece) S Tsitsipas	2	6	7^{7}	6

Fourth round
8	(United States) B Shelton	6	6	6
(Greece) S Tsitsipas	2	3	4

==== Section 8 ====
First round
15	(Kazakhstan) A Bublik	6	6	3	6
WC	(United States) JJ Wolf	4	2	6	1
(Argentina) TA Tirante	6	6	3	3	3
(France) A Mannarino	4	3	6	6	6
(Croatia) D Prižmić	2	6	6	5	7
(Kazakhstan) A Shevchenko	6	3	3	7	5
Q	(Hong Kong) C Wong	7^{7}	1	3	3
20	(United States) T Paul	6^{3}	6	6	6
30	(Italy) M Arnaldi	7	3	2	6^{8}
(Australia) J Duckworth	5	6	6	7^{10}
(China) Y Wu	7^{7}	6	7
(Australia) A Walton	6^{2}	2	5
(Portugal) J Faria	6	7^{7}	4	1	6
(United States) J Brooksby	3	6^{4}	6	6	2
R Safiullin	4	4	4
2	(Spain) C Alcaraz	6	6	6

Second round
15	(Kazakhstan) A Bublik	6	6	6
(France) A Mannarino	3	1	1
(Croatia) D Prižmić	2	3	7	4
20	(United States) T Paul	6	6	5	6
(Australia) J Duckworth	5	3	1
(China) Y Wu	7	6	6
(Portugal) J Faria	6	0	3	2
2	(Spain) C Alcaraz	4	6	6	6

Third round
15	(Kazakhstan) A Bublik	4	6	7^{7}	1	3
20	(United States) T Paul	6	3	6^{4}	6	6
(China) Y Wu	3	4	1
2	(Spain) C Alcaraz	6	6	6

Fourth round
20	(United States) T Paul	4	3	4
2	(Spain) C Alcaraz	6	6	6

== Seeded players ==
The following are the seeded players. Seedings are based on ATP rankings as of August 24, 2026. Rankings and points before are as of August 31, 2026.

^{‡}	Champion
^{†}	Runner-up

Seed	Rank	Player	Points before	Points defending	Points won	Points after	Status
1	2	(Germany) Alexander Zverev^{‡}	7,790	100	2,000	9,690	Champion, defeated (United States) Ben Shelton [8]
2	3	(Spain) Carlos Alcaraz	7,160	2,000	400	5,560	Quarterfinals lost to (United States) Ben Shelton [8]
3	4	(Canada) Félix Auger-Aliassime	4,640	800	50	3,890	Second round lost to Karen Khachanov
4	5	(Serbia) Novak Djokovic	3,770	800	10	2,980	First round lost to (Argentina) Mariano Navone
5	6	(Italy) Flavio Cobolli	3,720	100	100	3,720	Third round lost to (Belgium) Alexander Blockx [28]
6	7	(Australia) Alex de Minaur	3,650	400	50	3,300	Second round lost to (Netherlands) Botic van de Zandschulp
7	8	Daniil Medvedev	3,580	10	200	3,770	Fourth round lost to (United States) Frances Tiafoe [11]
8	9	(United States) Ben Shelton^{†}	3,480	100	1,300	4,680	Runner-up, lost to (Germany) Alexander Zverev [1]
9	10	(United States) Taylor Fritz	3,475	400	100	3,175	Third round lost to (Argentina) Francisco Cerúndolo [24]
10	11	(France) Arthur Fils	3,140	0	10	3,150	First round lost to (Greece) Stefanos Tsitsipas
11	12	(United States) Frances Tiafoe	2,680	100	800	3,380	Semifinals lost to (United States) Ben Shelton [8]
12	13	(Spain) Rafael Jódar	2,671	(22)^{∆}	10	2,659	First round lost to (China) Bu Yunchaokete [LL]
13	14	(Italy) Lorenzo Musetti	2,605	400	50	2,255	Second round lost to (Australia) Dane Sweeny [WC]
14	15	(United States) Learner Tien	2,565	10	200	2,755	Fourth round lost to Karen Khachanov
15	16	(Kazakhstan) Alexander Bublik	2,525	200	100	2,425	Third round lost to (United States) Tommy Paul [20]
16	17	(United States) Brandon Nakashima	2,485	50	50	2,485	Second round lost to (United States) Alex Michelsen
17	18	(Czech Republic) Jakub Menšík	2,445	50	100	2,495	Third round lost to (United States) Learner Tien [14]
18	19	(Czech Republic) Jiří Lehečka	2,420	400	100	2,120	Third round lost to (Greece) Stefanos Tsitsipas
19	20	(Norway) Casper Ruud	2,385	50	0	2,335	Withdrew due to back injury
20	21	(United States) Tommy Paul	2,225	100	200	2,325	Fourth round lost to (Spain) Carlos Alcaraz [2]
21	22	(Italy) Luciano Darderi	2,175	100+125	200+50	2,200	Fourth round lost to (Germany) Alexander Zverev [1]
22	23	(Monaco) Valentin Vacherot	2,168	(12+6)^{Ω}	100+0	2,250	Third round lost to (United States) Frances Tiafoe [11]
23	24	Andrey Rublev	2,080	200	50	1,930	Second round lost to (Spain) Daniel Mérida
24	25	(Argentina) Francisco Cerúndolo	1,980	50	200	2,130	Fourth round lost to (Belgium) Alexander Blockx [28]
25	28	(Chile) Alejandro Tabilo	1,688	10	100	1,778	Third round lost to (Germany) Alexander Zverev [1]
26	29	(France) Arthur Rinderknech	1,683	200	100	1,583	Third round lost to Daniil Medvedev [7]
27	32	(Argentina) Tomás Martín Etcheverry	1,440	50	200	1,590	Fourth round lost to (United States) Alex Michelsen
28	34	(Belgium) Alexander Blockx	1,396	8	400	1,788	Quarterfinals retired against Karen Khachanov
29	35	(United Kingdom) Cameron Norrie	1,365	100	10	1,275	First round lost to (France) Luca Van Assche
30	36	(Italy) Matteo Arnaldi	1,349	10	10	1,349	First round lost to (Australia) James Duckworth
31	37	(Belgium) Zizou Bergs	1,345	100	100	1,345	Third round lost to (Netherlands) Botic van de Zandschulp
32	30	(Peru) Ignacio Buse	1,550	40+125	50+25	1,460	Second round lost to (France) Benjamin Bonzi

∆ The player did not qualify for the tournament in 2025. Points for his 18th best result will be deducted instead.
Ω The player did not qualify for the tournament in 2025. He is defending points from two ATP Challenger Tour events instead.

=== Withdrawn players ===
The following players would have been seeded, but withdrew before the tournament began.

Rank	Player	Points before	Points defending	Points after	Withdrawal reason
1	(Italy) Jannik Sinner	12,800	1,300	11,500	Right knee injury
26	(Brazil) João Fonseca	1,800	50	1,750	Abdominal muscle injury
27	(Spain) Alejandro Davidovich Fokina	1,730	50	1,680	Back injury
31	(France) Ugo Humbert	1,545	10	1,535	Back injury

== Other entry information ==
=== Wildcards ===
- (United States) Darwin Blanch
- (United States) Sebastian Gorzny
- (United States) Jack Kennedy
- (France) Gaël Monfils
- (Australia) Dane Sweeny
- (Switzerland) Stan Wawrinka (Note: Wawrinka received a late wildcard entry following the withdrawal of Patrick Kypson.)
- (United States) J. J. Wolf
- (United States) Michael Zheng

=== Protected ranking ===
- (China) Shang Juncheng (56)
- ~~(Australia) Thanasi Kokkinakis (84)~~
- (Austria) Filip Misolic (101)
- (Spain) Carlos Taberner (107)

=== Qualifiers ===
- (Chile) Tomás Barrios Vera
- (United States) Nishesh Basavareddy
- (Italy) Federico Cinà
- (Bulgaria) Grigor Dimitrov
- (France) Hugo Gaston
- (Italy) Andrea Guerrieri
- (South Africa) Lloyd Harris
- (Italy) Francesco Passaro
- (Hungary) Zsombor Piros
- (Austria) Jurij Rodionov
- (Japan) Rei Sakamoto
- (United Kingdom) Toby Samuel
- (Australia) Tristan Schoolkate
- (Czech Republic) Dalibor Svrčina
- (United Kingdom) Harry Wendelken
- (Hong Kong) Coleman Wong

=== Lucky losers ===
- (China) Bu Yunchaokete
- (United Kingdom) Jacob Fearnley
- (France) Arthur Géa
- (Japan) Shintaro Mochizuki
- (Finland) Otto Virtanen

=== Withdrawals ===
The entry list was released based on the ATP rankings for the week of July 20, 2026.

- † (United States) Sebastian Korda (64) → replaced by (Australia) Aleksandar Vukic (102)
- † (United States) Emilio Nava (100) → replaced by (France) Benjamin Bonzi (103)
- † (Spain) Alejandro Davidovich Fokina (20) → replaced by (Australia) Alexei Popyrin (104)
- † (United States) Ethan Quinn (45) → replaced by (United States) Martin Damm (105)
- † (Canada) Gabriel Diallo (92) → replaced by (China) Wu Yibing (106)
- † (Italy) Jannik Sinner (1) → replaced by (Spain) Carlos Taberner (107 PR)
- † (Denmark) Holger Rune (80) → replaced by (Argentina) Facundo Díaz Acosta (108)
- ‡ (Brazil) João Fonseca (28) → replaced by (United Kingdom) Jacob Fearnley (LL)
- ‡ (France) Ugo Humbert (29) → replaced by (Japan) Shintaro Mochizuki (LL)
- § (Norway) Casper Ruud (13) → replaced by (France) Arthur Géa (LL)
- § (Croatia) Marin Čilić (86) → replaced by (Finland) Otto Virtanen (LL)
- § (Australia) Thanasi Kokkinakis (84 PR) → replaced by (China) Bu Yunchaokete (LL)

† – withdrew from entry list before qualifying began
‡ – withdrew from entry list after qualifying began
§ – withdrew from main draw

== Notes ==
Preceded by 2026 Wimbledon Championships – Men's singles	Grand Slam men's singles	Succeeded by 2027 Australian Open – Men's singles
