= 2023 Yokkaichi Challenger – Doubles =

Doubles
- 2023 Yokkaichi Challenger

Final
- Champions: (United States) Evan King (United States) Reese Stalder
- Runners-up: (Chinese Taipei) Ray Ho (Australia) Calum Puttergill
- Score: 7–5, 6–4

Events
Singles	Doubles
- Yokkaichi Challenger

Hsu Yu-hsiou and Yuta Shimizu were the defending champions but lost in the quarterfinals to Rithvik Choudary Bollipalli and Arjun Kadhe.

Evan King and Reese Stalder won the title after defeating Ray Ho and Calum Puttergill 7–5, 6–4 in the final.

== Seeds ==
1. (United States) Evan King / (United States) Reese Stalder (champions)
2. (Poland) Karol Drzewiecki / (Czech Republic) Zdeněk Kolář (first round)
3. (Serbia) Ivan Sabanov / (Serbia) Matej Sabanov (first round)
4. (India) Rithvik Choudary Bollipalli / (India) Arjun Kadhe (semifinals)

== Draw ==
Key

- Q = Qualifier
- WC = Wild card
- LL = Lucky loser
- Alt = Alternate
- ITF = ITF entry
- PR = Protected ranking
- SR = Special ranking
- SE = Special exempt
- JE = Junior exempt
- JR = Junior Accelerator Programme entrant
- CO = College Accelerator Programme entrant
- NG = Next Gen Accelerator Program entrant
- w/o = Walkover
- r = Retired
- d = Defaulted

First round
1	(United States) E King (United States) R Stalder	6	3	[10]
(Poland) P Matuszewski (Germany) K Wehnelt	1	6	[7]
(South Korea) J-s Nam (Hong Kong) C Wong	6	6
(Philippines) R Gonzales (China) F Sun	3	4
3	(Serbia) I Sabanov (Serbia) M Sabanov	4	5
WC	(Japan) J Trotter (Japan) T Yuzuki	6	7
(India) N Kaliyanda Poonacha (India) D Sharan	6	2	[10]
(Japan) T Matsui (Japan) K Uesugi	0	6	[8]
(Northern Mariana Islands) C Sinclair (New Zealand) A Sitak	6	1	[5]
(Chinese Taipei) Y-h Hsu (Japan) Y Shimizu	1	6	[10]
WC	(Japan) Seiya Mizuno (Japan) Shion Motoyama	4	2
4	(India) RC Bollipalli (India) A Kadhe	6	6
(Japan) R Noguchi (Japan) K Uchida	6	7^{7}
(Sweden) F Bergevi (Netherlands) M Veldheer	4	6^{5}
(Chinese Taipei) R Ho (Australia) C Puttergill	2	7^{7}	[10]
2	(Poland) K Drzewiecki (Czech Republic) Z Kolář	6	6^{2}	[4]

Quarterfinals
1	(United States) E King (United States) R Stalder	6	6^{6}	[12]
(South Korea) J-s Nam (Hong Kong) C Wong	4	7^{8}	[10]
WC	(Japan) J Trotter (Japan) T Yuzuki	6^{6}	6	[8]
(India) N Kaliyanda Poonacha (India) D Sharan	7^{8}	3	[10]
(Chinese Taipei) Y-h Hsu (Japan) Y Shimizu	4	3
4	(India) RC Bollipalli (India) A Kadhe	6	6
(Japan) R Noguchi (Japan) K Uchida	3	6	[4]
(Chinese Taipei) R Ho (Australia) C Puttergill	6	2	[10]

Semifinals
1	(United States) E King (United States) R Stalder	6	6
(India) N Kaliyanda Poonacha (India) D Sharan	3	2
4	(India) RC Bollipalli (India) A Kadhe	4	4
(Chinese Taipei) R Ho (Australia) C Puttergill	6	6

Final
1	(United States) E King (United States) R Stalder	7	6
(Chinese Taipei) R Ho (Australia) C Puttergill	5	4
