= 2022 Yokkaichi Challenger =

- Date: 21–27 November
- Edition: 2nd
- Location: Yokkaichi, Japan

Champions

Singles
- (Japan) Yosuke Watanuki

Doubles
- (Chinese Taipei) Hsu Yu-hsiou / (Japan) Yuta Shimizu
← 2019 ·	Yokkaichi Challenger	· 2023 →

The 2022 Yokkaichi Challenger was a professional tennis tournament played on hard courts. It was the 2nd edition of the tournament, which was part of the 2022 ATP Challenger Tour. It took place in Yokkaichi, Japan, between 21 and 27 November 2022.

== Singles main-draw entrants ==
=== Seeds ===
Country	Player	Rank^{1}	Seed
JPN	Kaichi Uchida	161	1
AUS	James Duckworth	173	2
JPN	Yosuke Watanuki	196	3
JPN	Rio Noguchi	205	4
TPE	Hsu Yu-hsiou	217	5
ROU	Nicholas David Ionel	233	6
VIE	Lý Hoàng Nam	234	7
AUS	Dane Sweeny	248	8

- ^{1} Rankings are as of 14 November 2022.

=== Other entrants ===
The following players received wildcards into the singles main draw:

- (Japan) Shinji Hazawa
- (Japan) Shintaro Imai
- (Japan) Naoki Nakagawa

The following player received entry into the singles main draw using a protected ranking:

- (Japan) Yūichi Sugita

The following players received entry from the qualifying draw:

- (South Korea) Lee Duck-hee
- (Japan) Yuki Mochizuki
- (Japan) Makoto Ochi
- (Japan) Keisuke Saitoh
- (Japan) Shuichi Sekiguchi
- (Northern Mariana Islands) Colin Sinclair

The following player received entry as a lucky loser:

- (Japan) James Trotter

== Champions ==
=== Singles ===
- (Japan) Yosuke Watanuki def. (Portugal) Frederico Ferreira Silva 6–2, 6–2.

=== Doubles ===
- (Chinese Taipei) Hsu Yu-hsiou / (Japan) Yuta Shimizu def. (Japan) Masamichi Imamura / (Japan) Rio Noguchi 7–6^{(7–2)}, 6–4.
