= 2025 Keio Challenger – Men's doubles =

Men's doubles
- 2025 Keio Challenger

Final
- Champions: (Austria) Neil Oberleitner (Czech Republic) Michael Vrbenský
- Runners-up: (Japan) Masamichi Imamura (Japan) Ryuki Matsuda
- Score: 7–6^{(8–6)}, 6–1

Events
Singles	men	women
Doubles	men	women
- Keio Challenger

Benjamin Hassan and Saketh Myneni were the defending champions but chose not to defend their title.

Neil Oberleitner and Michael Vrbenský won the title after defeating Masamichi Imamura and Ryuki Matsuda 7–6^{(8–6)}, 6–1 in the final.

== Seeds ==
1. (United States) Nathaniel Lammons / (Netherlands) Jean-Julien Rojer (quarterfinals)
2. (Austria) Neil Oberleitner / (Czech Republic) Michael Vrbenský (champions)
3. (South Korea) Nam Ji-sung / (Japan) Takeru Yuzuki (semifinals)
4. (Japan) Kaito Uesugi / (Japan) Seita Watanabe (quarterfinals)

== Draw ==
Key

- Q = Qualifier
- WC = Wild card
- LL = Lucky loser
- Alt = Alternate
- ITF = ITF entry
- PR = Protected ranking
- SR = Special ranking
- SE = Special exempt
- JE = Junior exempt
- JR = Junior Accelerator Programme entrant
- CO = College Accelerator Programme entrant
- NG = Next Gen Accelerator Program entrant
- w/o = Walkover
- r = Retired
- d = Defaulted

First round
1	(United States) N Lammons (Netherlands) J-J Rojer	6	6
(United States) G Goldhoff (United States) T Winegar	4	4
(Japan) M Imamura (Japan) Ryuki Matsuda	6	4	[10]
WC	(Japan) Lennon Roark Jones (Japan) Shogo Sanada	1	6	[6]
3	(South Korea) J-s Nam (Japan) T Yuzuki	3	6	[10]
(India) J Nedunchezhiyan (South Korea) U-s Park	6	3	[5]
WC	(Japan) Gai Ando (Japan) Jouji Ishijima	2	3
(Netherlands) T Loof (India) R Ramanathan	6	6
(Chinese Taipei) Y-h Hsu (Chinese Taipei) T-h Huang	4	2
(Japan) K Isomura (Japan) Y Shimizu	6	6
(Netherlands) M Hermans (Netherlands) M Veldheer	6	5	[3]
4	(Japan) K Uesugi (Japan) S Watanabe	4	7	[10]
(Chinese Taipei) R Ho (Japan) A Santillan	2	5
(Japan) Y Kusuhara (Japan) S Nakagawa	6	7
(Thailand) P Isaro (India) N Kaliyanda Poonacha	6^{3}	4
2	(Austria) N Oberleitner (Czech Republic) M Vrbenský	7^{7}	6

Quarterfinals
1	(United States) N Lammons (Netherlands) J-J Rojer	4	4
(Japan) M Imamura (Japan) R Matsuda	6	6
3	(South Korea) J-s Nam (Japan) T Yuzuki	7^{7}	7
(Netherlands) T Loof (India) R Ramanathan	6^{3}	5
(Japan) K Isomura (Japan) Y Shimizu	6	6
4	(Japan) K Uesugi (Japan) S Watanabe	3	4
(Japan) Y Kusuhara (Japan) S Nakagawa	3	3
2	(Austria) N Oberleitner (Czech Republic) M Vrbenský	6	6

Semifinals
(Japan) M Imamura (Japan) R Matsuda	7^{7}	3	[12]
3	(South Korea) J-s Nam (Japan) T Yuzuki	6^{2}	6	[10]
(Japan) K Isomura (Japan) Y Shimizu	6	3	[6]
2	(Austria) N Oberleitner (Czech Republic) M Vrbenský	3	6	[10]

Final
(Japan) M Imamura (Japan) R Matsuda	6^{6}	1
2	(Austria) N Oberleitner (Czech Republic) M Vrbenský	7^{8}	6
