= 2019 Yokkaichi Challenger – Doubles =

Doubles
- 2019 Yokkaichi Challenger

Final
- Champions: (South Korea) Nam Ji-sung (South Korea) Song Min-kyu
- Runners-up: (China) Gong Maoxin (China) Zhang Ze
- Score: 6–3, 3–6, [14–12]

Events
Singles	Doubles
- Yokkaichi Challenger

This was the first edition of the tournament.

Nam Ji-sung and Song Min-kyu won the title after defeating Gong Maoxin and Zhang Ze 6–3, 3–6, [14–12] in the final.

== Seeds ==
1. (China) Gong Maoxin / (China) Zhang Ze (final)
2. (Finland) Harri Heliövaara / (Chinese Taipei) Yang Tsung-hua (first round)
3. (Thailand) Sanchai Ratiwatana / (Thailand) Sonchat Ratiwatana (semifinals)
4. (United States) John Paul Fruttero / (Philippines) Ruben Gonzales (first round)

== Draw ==
Key

- Q = Qualifier
- WC = Wild card
- LL = Lucky loser
- Alt = Alternate
- ITF = ITF entry
- PR = Protected ranking
- SR = Special ranking
- SE = Special exempt
- JE = Junior exempt
- JR = Junior Accelerator Programme entrant
- CO = College Accelerator Programme entrant
- NG = Next Gen Accelerator Program entrant
- w/o = Walkover
- r = Retired
- d = Defaulted

First round
1	(China) M Gong (China) Ze Zhang	6	4	[10]
WC	(Japan) Makoto Ochi (Japan) Renta Tokuda	4	6	[6]
ITF	(Australia) T Fancutt (Australia) D Kelly	4
(Japan) T Matsui (Japan) K Uesugi	3^{r}
3	(Thailand) Sa Ratiwatana (Thailand) So Ratiwatana	6	6
WC	(Japan) Y Shimizu (Japan) N Tajima	3	4
ITF	(Japan) Jumpei Yamasaki (United States) E Zhu	1	4
WC	(Japan) Shuichi Sekiguchi (Japan) S Shimabukuro	6	6
(South Korea) Y-s Chung (Chinese Taipei) T-l Wu	6	6
(Zimbabwe) B Lock (Zimbabwe) CJ Lock	1	2
(South Korea) J-s Nam (South Korea) M-k Song	6	6
4	(United States) JP Fruttero (Philippines) R Gonzales	2	4
(Australia) B Ellis (Japan) H Moriya	7^{9}	3	[10]
(Japan) Shintaro Imai (Japan) Y Takahashi	6^{7}	6	[12]
(Australia) H Bourchier (India) S Myneni	6	6
2	(Finland) H Heliövaara (Chinese Taipei) T-h Yang	4	1

Quarterfinals
1	(China) M Gong (China) Ze Zhang	w/o
ITF	(Australia) T Fancutt (Australia) D Kelly
3	(Thailand) Sa Ratiwatana (Thailand) So Ratiwatana	6^{3}	6	[10]
WC	(Japan) S Sekiguchi (Japan) S Shimabukuro	7^{7}	3	[5]
(South Korea) Y-s Chung (Chinese Taipei) T-l Wu	7	5	[9]
(South Korea) J-s Nam (South Korea) M-k Song	5	7	[11]
(Japan) S Imai (Japan) Y Takahashi	6	6
(Australia) H Bourchier (India) S Myneni	4	4

Semifinals
1	(China) M Gong (China) Ze Zhang	6	6
3	(Thailand) Sa Ratiwatana (Thailand) So Ratiwatana	2	1
(South Korea) J-s Nam (South Korea) M-k Song	6	6
(Japan) S Imai (Japan) Y Takahashi	2	4

Final
1	(China) M Gong (China) Ze Zhang	3	6	[12]
(South Korea) J-s Nam (South Korea) M-k Song	6	3	[14]
