= 2019 Yokkaichi Challenger =

- Date: 5–11 August
- Edition: 1st
- Location: Yokkaichi, Japan

Champions

Singles
- (Japan) Yūichi Sugita

Doubles
- (South Korea) Nam Ji-sung / (South Korea) Song Min-kyu
Yokkaichi Challenger	· 2022 →

The 2019 Yokkaichi Challenger was a professional tennis tournament played on hard courts. It was the 1st edition of the tournament which was part of the 2019 ATP Challenger Tour. It took place in Yokkaichi, Japan between 5 and 11 August 2019.

== Singles main-draw entrants ==
=== Seeds ===
Country	Player	Rank^{1}	Seed
JPN	Yasutaka Uchiyama	139	1
AUS	James Duckworth	141	2
JPN	Tatsuma Ito	154	3
KOR	Chung Hyeon	166	4
JPN	Yūichi Sugita	197	5
CHN	Zhang Ze	215	6
JPN	Hiroki Moriya	216	7
KOR	Chung Yun-seong	237	8
IND	Saketh Myneni	264	9
TPE	Wu Tung-lin	282	10
KOR	Nam Ji-sung	292	11
TPE	Yang Tsung-hua	300	12
JPN	Makoto Ochi	378	13
JPN	Yusuke Takahashi	389	14
JPN	Renta Tokuda	397	15
VIE	Lý Hoàng Nam	400	16

- ^{1} Rankings are as of July 29, 2019.

=== Other entrants ===
The following players received wildcards into the singles main draw:

- (Japan) Yasunori Hashikawa
- (Japan) Shinji Hazawa
- (Japan) Yuya Ito

The following players received entry into the singles main draw as alternates:

- (United States) John Paul Fruttero
- (Zimbabwe) Courtney John Lock

The following players received entry into the singles main draw using their ITF World Tennis Ranking:

- (Zimbabwe) Benjamin Lock
- (Japan) Yuki Mochizuki
- (Japan) Sho Shimabukuro
- (Japan) Kento Takeuchi
- (Japan) Jumpei Yamasaki

== Champions ==
=== Singles ===
- (Japan) Yūichi Sugita def. (Australia) James Duckworth 3–6, 6–3, 7–6^{(7–1)}.

=== Doubles ===
- (South Korea) Nam Ji-sung / (South Korea) Song Min-kyu def. (China) Gong Maoxin / (China) Zhang Ze 6–3, 3–6, [14–12].
