= 2024 Yokkaichi Challenger =

- Date: 25 November – 1 December
- Edition: 4th
- Location: Yokkaichi, Japan

Champions

Singles
- (Japan) Rei Sakamoto

Doubles
- (Australia) Thomas Fancutt / (Switzerland) Jakub Paul
- Yokkaichi Challenger

The 2024 Yokkaichi Challenger was a professional tennis tournament played on hard courts. It was the 4th edition of the tournament which was part of the 2024 ATP Challenger Tour. It took place in Yokkaichi, Japan between 25 November and 1 December 2024.

== Singles main-draw entrants ==
=== Seeds ===
Country	Player	Rank^{1}	Seed
JPN	Yoshihito Nishioka	70	1
ITA	Mattia Bellucci	100	2
~~JPN~~	~~Yasutaka Uchiyama~~	~~141~~	~~3~~
HKG	Coleman Wong	161	4
AUS	Omar Jasika	178	5
AUS	Li Tu	189	6
JPN	Sho Shimabukuro	193	7
JPN	Yuta Shimizu	217	8
~~TPE~~	~~Hsu Yu-hsiou~~	~~236~~	~~9~~

- ^{1} Rankings are as of 18 November 2024.

=== Other entrants ===
The following players received wildcards into the singles main draw:

- (Japan) Kokoro Isomura
- (Japan) Rei Sakamoto
- (Japan) Yua Taka

The following player received entry into the singles main draw as an alternate:

- (Japan) Naoki Nakagawa

The following players received entry from the qualifying draw:

- (South Africa) Philip Henning
- (Japan) Hiroki Moriya
- (Germany) Christoph Negritu
- (Switzerland) Jakub Paul
- (Japan) Ryotaro Taguchi
- (Japan) Yusuke Takahashi

The following players received entry as lucky losers:

- (United States) Alafia Ayeni
- Petr Bar Biryukov

== Champions ==
=== Singles ===
- (Japan) Rei Sakamoto def. (Germany) Christoph Negritu 1–6, 6–3, 6–4.

=== Doubles ===
- (Australia) Thomas Fancutt / (Switzerland) Jakub Paul def. (Japan) Kokoro Isomura / (Japan) Hikaru Shiraishi 6–2, 7–5.
