= Zizou Bergs =

Belgian tennis player (born 1999)

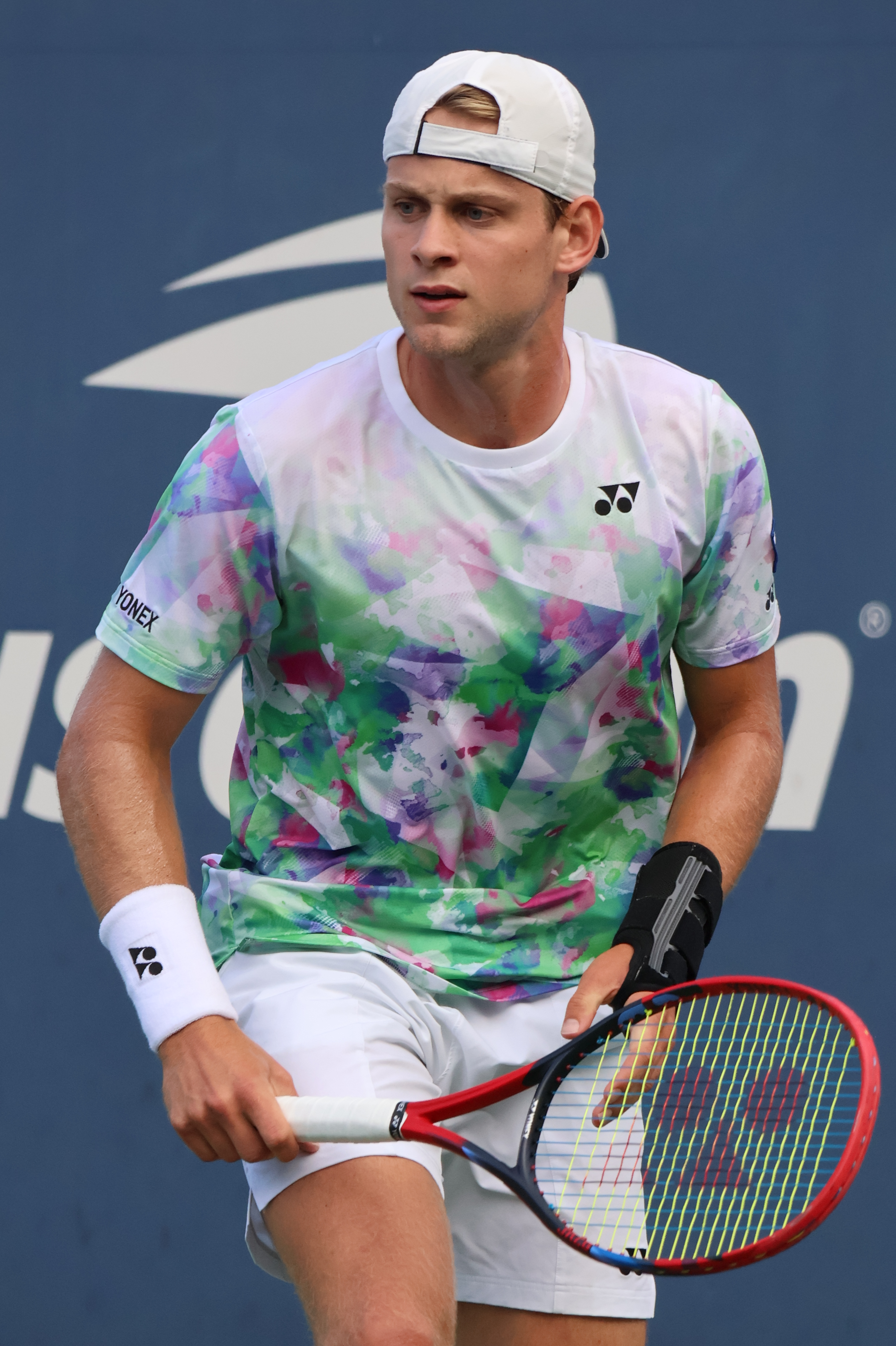
- Bergs at the 2023 US Open
- Country (sports): Belgium
- Residence: Antwerp, Belgium
- Born: 3 June 1999 (age 27) Lommel, Belgium
- Height: 1.85 m (6 ft 1 in)
- Turned pro: 2018
- Plays: Right-handed (two-handed backhand)
- Coach: Jan de Witt (Jul 2025–), Ruben Bemelmans (May 2022–2025), Kristof Vliegen (Nov 2024–Apr 2025)
- Prize money: US $5,343,574

Singles
- Career record: 71–81
- Career titles: 1
- Highest ranking: No. 33 (10 August 2026)
- Current ranking: No. 44 (9 November 2026)

Grand Slam singles results
- Australian Open: 1R (2023, 2024, 2025, 2026)
- French Open: 3R (2024)
- Wimbledon: 3R (2026)
- US Open: 3R (2025, 2026)

Other tournaments
- Olympic Games: 1R (2024)

Doubles
- Career record: 11–15
- Career titles: 0
- Highest ranking: No. 265 (27 November 2023)
- Current ranking: No. 403 (10 August 2026)

Grand Slam doubles results
- Australian Open: 1R (2026)
- French Open: 2R (2026)
- Wimbledon: 1R (2025)
- US Open: 1R (2024, 2025)
- Last updated on: 10 August 2026.

Zizou Bergs (Dutch pronunciation: [ziˈzu ˈbɛr(ə)xs]; born 3 June 1999) is a Belgian professional tennis player. He has a career-high ATP singles ranking of world No. 33 achieved on 10 August 2026 and a best doubles ranking of No. 265, reached on 27 November 2023. He is the current No. 2 Belgian player in men's singles.

Bergs has won one ATP Tour singles title at the 2026 Eastbourne Open.

== Early life ==
Bergs was born in Lommel, Belgium, to parents Koen Bergs and Anne-Mie Driesen. His father is the senior executive of a train company in Belgium and his mother is a photographer. He has a brother, Maxim. Bergs' parents named him Zizou after French football player Zinedine Zidane, who had this nickname. He started taking tennis lessons in his early childhood at age 3.

== Career ==
=== 2020: ATP Tour debut and first win ===
Bergs made his ATP main draw debut as a wildcard at the 2020 European Open. In the first round, he recorded his first ATP victory by defeating Albert Ramos Viñolas in straight sets, before pushing world No. 17 Karen Khachanov to three sets in the second round.

=== 2021: Three ATP Challenger titles, top 200 debut ===
In March 2021, Bergs won his first Challenger title at Saint Petersburg. Later that month, he won his second Challenger title at Lille. In June, he won his third Challenger title at Almaty.

After defeating fellow qualifier Oscar Otte in the first round of the Swiss Open Gstaad, he reached the top 200 at World No. 196 on 26 July 2021. In October, he again received a wildcard into the European Open, but lost in the first round to Lloyd Harris.

=== 2022: Major & top 150 debuts, Challenger title, ===
Bergs reached his first final of the season at the Saint-Brieuc Challenger, losing to Jack Draper. In May, he reached his second Challenger final of the season at the Saturn Oil Open in Troisdorf, Germany, where he lost to Lukáš Klein.

Ranked No. 207, he won the Ilkley Trophy as a qualifier, defeating lucky loser Alexei Popyrin in the semifinals and Jack Sock in the final. As a result, he received a wildcard into Wimbledon, where he made his Grand Slam debut. He also climbed more than 60 positions up the rankings to a new career-high of world No. 146 on 20 June 2022.

=== 2023: United Cup, Masters & top 125 debuts ===
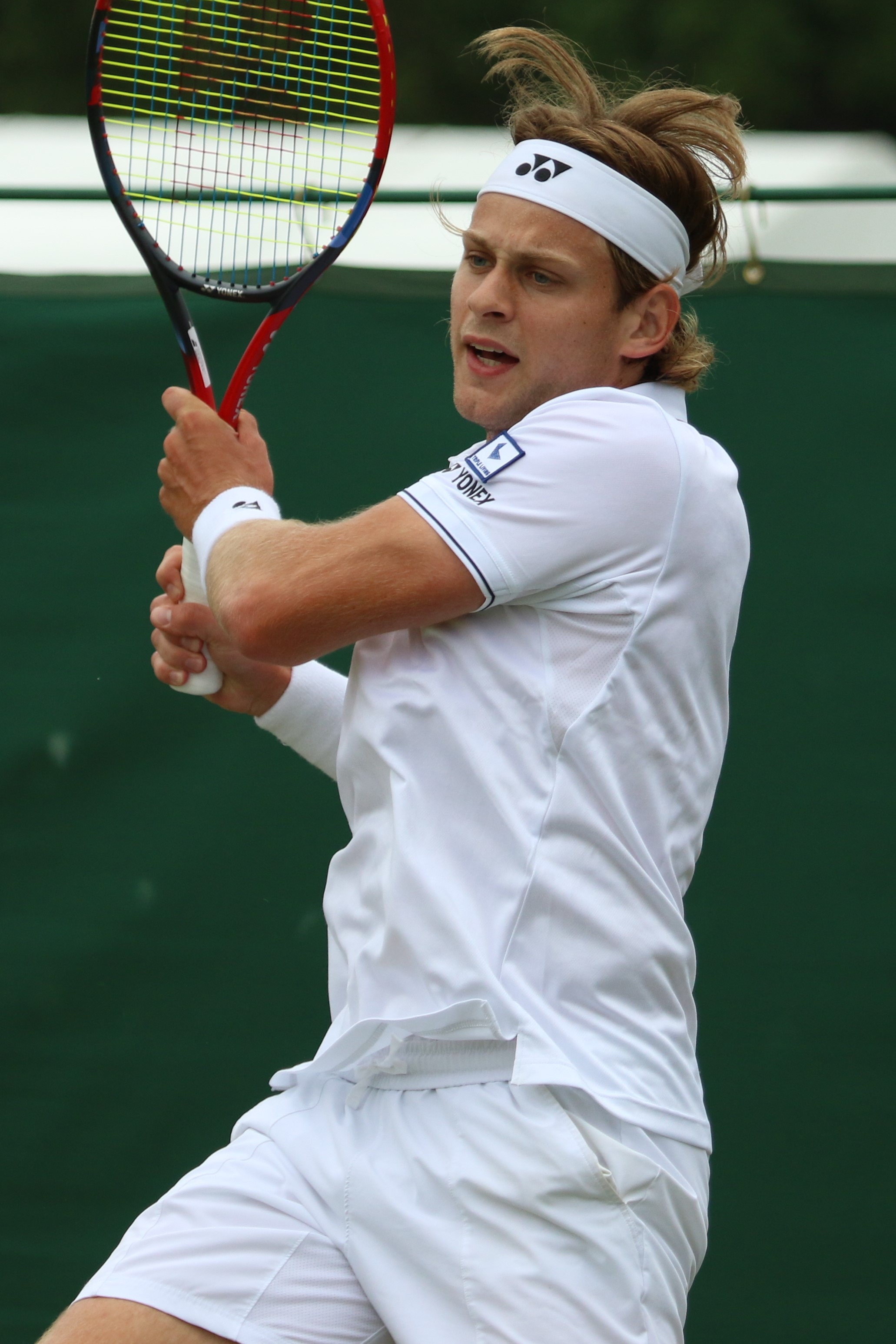
Bergs at the 2023 Wimbledon Championships

At the inaugural 2023 United Cup, Bergs lost his two singles matches against Bulgarian Dimitar Kuzmanov and Greek Stefanos Sakellaridis. He then qualified for the main draw at the Australian Open, defeating another Bulgarian, Adrian Andreev, but lost in the first round to Laslo Djere.

The Belgian received a wildcard for the Miami Open, but lost in the first round to lucky loser Thanasi Kokkinakis. He entered the U.S. Men's Clay Court Championships as a lucky loser directly into the second round, but lost to Cristian Garín. As the defending champion, he entered the Ilkley Trophy Challenger, but lost to Denis Kudla in the second round.

Bergs missed several months playing on the ATP Tour, due to a torn ligament in his left wrist, but returned in September at the Chengdu Open as a wildcard. In October, he received a wildcard in doubles for the European Open in Antwerp, alongside compatriot Tibo Colson. In November, at the Calgary Challenger, he reached the quarterfinals and won his sixth Challenger title in Drummondville, and in December, his seventh in Yokkaichi.

=== 2024: French Open debut, top 65 ===
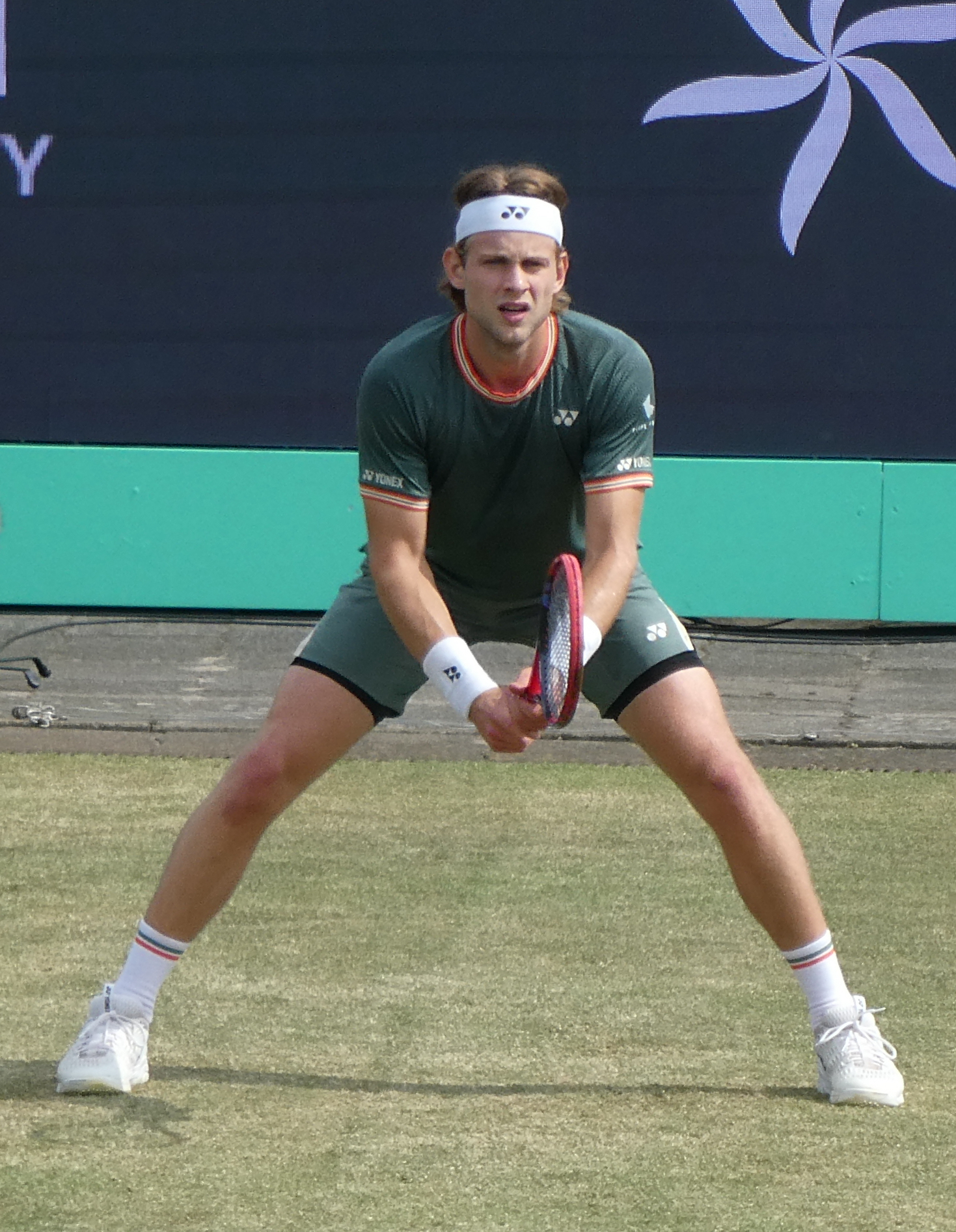
Bergs at the 2024 Libéma Open

In April, Bergs won his first match of the season on the ATP Tour in Houston, defeating qualifier Patrick Kypson in the first round, before losing to top seed and eventual champion Ben Shelton in the second round. Bergs then reached back-to-back finals on the ATP Challenger Tour, in Sarasota where he lost to Thanasi Kokkinakis and in Tallahassee where he defended his title and defeated Mitchell Krueger to win his eighth Challenger title.

Bergs received a wildcard for the main draw at the Madrid Open, where he made his debut but lost in the first round to Luca Van Assche. In May, Bergs qualified for the main draw of the Italian Open, where he lost to Rafael Nadal in the first round. Ranked No. 102, Bergs made his French Open debut after qualifying for the main draw. He upset 24th seed Alejandro Tabilo for his first win at a Major and defeated Maximilian Marterer to reach the third round of a Major for the first time where he lost to 10th seed Grigor Dimitrov. As a result, he reached the top 85 in the rankings on 10 June 2024.

In the beginning of the grass court season he entered the main draw of the Rosmalen Open as a lucky loser and defeated local wildcard Tim van Rijthoven, before losing to top seed Alex de Minaur in the second round. He also entered the main draw at the Wimbledon after qualifying but lost to Arthur Cazaux in five sets with a super tiebreaker in the fifth. As a result, he reached the top 75 in the singles rankings on 15 July 2024.

At the US Open, Bergs also played a first round match with a super tiebreaker in the fifth, but won it this time defeating Pavel Kotov. He lost his next match against 31st seed Flavio Cobolli. In October, Bergs reached the quarterfinals at the European Open in Antwerp with wins over Facundo Díaz Acosta and fourth seed Sebastián Báez, before his run was ended by eighth seed Marcos Giron. The following month, ranked No. 61, Bergs also made it through to the quarterfinals at the Moselle Open, defeating lucky loser Manuel Guinard and Hugo Gaston. Bergs lost in the last eight to Cameron Norrie.

=== 2025: ATP finals, top 10 win, Masters quarterfinal, top 50 ===
In January, Bergs reached his maiden ATP Tour final as a qualifier at the 2025 ASB Classic with wins over Pablo Carreño Busta, Francisco Comesaña, Isaac Becroft, Luca Nardi, Roberto Carballés Baena, and seventh seed Nuno Borges. As a result, Bergs reached the top 60 in the rankings on 13 January 2025. He lost to Gaël Monfils in straight sets in the championship match.

In February, Bergs reached his second career semifinal at the Open 13 in Marseille, with wins over eight seed Nuno Borges and Zhizhen Zhang by retirement. In March, at the 2025 Miami Open, Bergs reached the third round recording his first top 10 win over eight seed Andrey Rublev. As a result, he reached the top 50 on 31 March 2025.

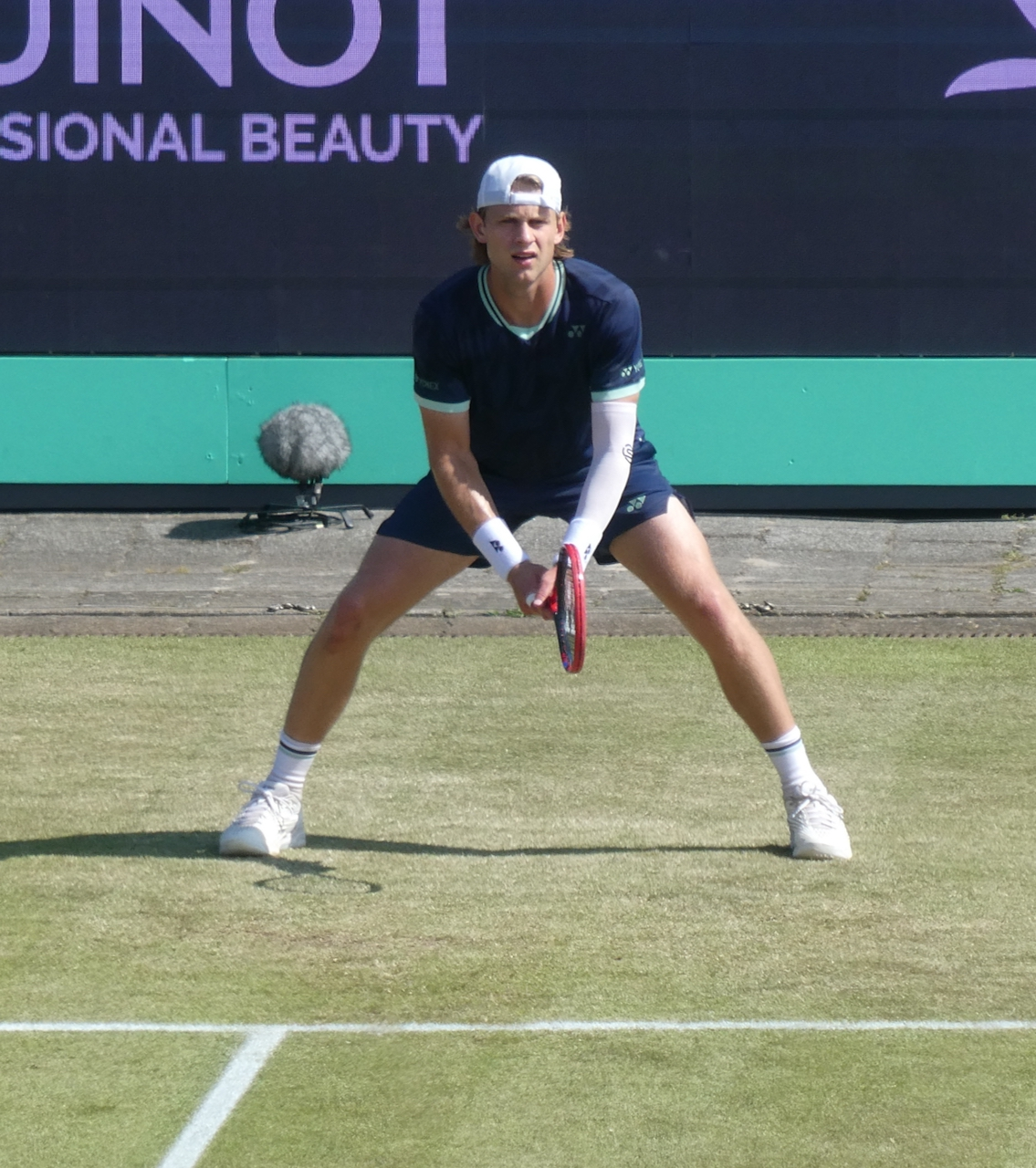
Bergs at the 2025 Libéma Open

In June, Bergs reached his second career ATP final at the 2025 Libéma Open in 's-Hertogenbosch with a win over Mark Lajal in the quarterfinal, and Reilly Opelka in the semifinal. He lost to Gabriel Diallo in the final.

In September, Bergs reached the third round of the US Open after the withdrawal of Jack Draper, where he lost to Jaume Munar in straight sets. At the 2025 Rolex Shanghai Masters he reached his first Masters-level quarterfinal defeating Gabriel Diallo and reached the top 40 on 13 October 2025.

=== 2026: First Belgian ATP Tour grass champion, first top 3 win ===
Bergs defeated Ugo Humbert in the final of the 2026 Eastbourne Open to lift his first ATP Tour title. Bergs became the first Belgian player to win an ATP Tour title on grass. In October, Bergs earned his first ever win against a top 5 player, as he inflicted a shock defeat against Carlos Alcaraz in the third round of the Shanghai Masters, returning to the 4th round of the tournament for the second consecutive year.

== National representation ==
In the 2025 Davis Cup qualifiers tie against Chile, Bergs struck his opponent Cristian Garín with his shoulder while celebrating a point, with Garín grasping at his right eye and collapsing to the ground. Bergs was given a warning for unsportsmanlike conduct. According to the Chilean team doctor, Garín was in no condition to continue playing. However, the independent tournament doctor cleared Garín to continue. As Garín did not return to court, umpire Carlos Ramos gave him three consecutive time violations, thus ending the match. In a news conference, umpire Ramos said "I consider it was a very unfortunate accident between two players — caused unfortunately by a player without any intention". After the match, the Chile Tennis Federation officially requested to the International Tennis Federation a reversal of the match result, a rescheduling of the decisive fifth match to a later date and an automatic wildcard entry into the Davis Cup Finals, as well as an internal revision of umpire Ramos actions and decisions.

== Career statistics ==
=== Performance timeline ===
Key
W	F	SF	QF	#R	RR	Q#	DNQ	A	NH

(W) winner; (F) finalist; (SF) semifinalist; (QF) quarterfinalist; (#R) rounds 4, 3, 2, 1; (RR) round-robin stage; (Q#) qualification round; (DNQ) did not qualify; (A) absent; (NH) not held; (SR) strike rate (events won / competed); (W–L) win–loss record.
To avoid confusion and double counting, these charts are updated at the conclusion of a tournament or when the player's participation has ended.

==== Singles ====
Tournament	2021	2022	2023	2024	2025	2026	SR	W–L	Win %
Grand Slam tournaments
Australian Open	A	Q1	1R	1R	1R	1R	0 / 4	0–4	0%
French Open	A	Q1	Q2	3R	1R	1R	0 / 3	2–3	40%
Wimbledon	A	1R	Q2	1R	1R	3R	0 / 4	2–4	33%
US Open	Q2	Q3	Q1	2R	3R	3R	0 / 3	4–3	57%
Win–loss	0–0	0–1	0–1	3–4	1–4	4–4	0 / 14	8–14	36%
ATP Tour Masters 1000
Indian Wells Masters	A	A	A	A	2R	2R	0 / 2	2–2	50%
Miami Open	A	A	1R	Q2	3R	2R	0 / 3	3–3	50%
Monte-Carlo Masters	A	A	A	A	Q1	3R	0 / 1	2–1	67%
Madrid Open	A	A	A	1R	1R	1R	0 / 3	0–3	0%
Italian Open	A	A	A	1R	A	1R	0 / 2	0–2	0%
Canadian Open	A	A	A	A	1R	2R	0 / 2	1–2	33%
Cincinnati Masters	A	A	A	Q1	2R	2R	0 / 2	1–2	33%
Shanghai Masters	NH		A	2R	QF	4R	0 / 3	8–3	73%
Paris Masters	A	A	A	2R	2R	1R	0 / 3	2–3	40%
Win–loss	0–0	0–0	0–1	2–4	9–7	8–9	0 / 21	19–21	48%

=== ATP Tour finals ===
==== Singles: 3 (1 title, 2 runner-ups) ====
Legend Grand Slam (–) ATP 1000 (–) ATP 500 (–) ATP 250 (1–2)	Finals by surface Hard (0–1) Clay (–) Grass (1–1)	Finals by setting Outdoor (1–2) Indoor (–)

Result	W–L	Date	Tournament	Tier	Surface	Opponent	Score
Loss	0–1	Jan 2025	Auckland Open, New Zealand	ATP 250	Hard	(France) Gaël Monfils	3–6, 4–6
Loss	0–2	Jun 2025	Libéma Open, Netherlands	ATP 250	Grass	(Canada) Gabriel Diallo	5–7, 6–7^{(8–10)}
Win	1–2	Jun 2026	Eastbourne Open, UK	ATP 250	Grass	(France) Ugo Humbert	3–6, 6–1, 6–4

==== Doubles: 1 (runner-up) ====
Legend Grand Slam (–) ATP 1000 (–) ATP 500 (–) ATP 250 (0–1)	Finals by surface Hard (–) Clay (–) Grass (0–1)	Finals by setting Outdoor (0–1) Indoor (–)

Result	W–L	Date	Tournament	Tier	Surface	Partner	Opponents	Score
Loss	0–1	Jun 2026	Libéma Open, Netherlands	ATP 250	Grass	(France) Arthur Rinderknech	(Netherlands) Sander Arends (Netherlands) David Pel	6–7^{(6–8)}, 6–7^{(5–7)}

=== ATP Challenger Tour finals ===
Challenger

==== Singles: 13 (8 titles, 5 runner-ups) ====
Finals by surface
Hard (4–2)
Clay (3–3)
Grass (1–0)

Result	W–L	Date	Tournament	Surface	Opponent	Score
Win	1–0	Mar 2021	St. Petersburg Challenger, Russia	Hard (i)	(Turkey) Altuğ Çelikbilek	6–4, 3–6, 6–4
Win	2–0	Mar 2021	Play In Challenger, France	Hard (i)	(France) Grégoire Barrère	4–6, 6–1, 7–6^{(7–5)}
Win	3–0	Jun 2021	Almaty Challenger, Kazakhstan	Clay	(Kazakhstan) Timofey Skatov	4–6, 6–3, 6–2
Loss	3–1	Mar 2022	Open Saint-Brieuc, France	Hard (i)	(United Kingdom) Jack Draper	2–6, 7–5, 4–6
Loss	3–2	May 2022	Saturn Oil Open, Germany	Clay	(Slovakia) Lukáš Klein	2–6, 4–6
Win	4–2	Jun 2022	Ilkley Trophy, UK	Grass	(United States) Jack Sock	7–6^{(9–7)}, 2–6, 7–6^{(8–6)}
Loss	4–3	Aug 2022	Rafa Nadal Open, Spain	Hard	(Italy) Luca Nardi	6–7^{(2–7)}, 6–3, 5–7
Win	5–3	Apr 2023	Tallahassee Tennis Challenger, US	Clay (green)	(Chinese Taipei) Wu Tung-lin	7–5, 6–2
Win	6–3	Nov 2023	Challenger Nationale de Drummondville, Canada	Hard (i)	(Australia) James Duckworth	6–4, 7–5
Win	7–3	Nov 2023	Yokkaichi Challenger, Japan	Hard	(United States) Michael Mmoh	6–2, 7–6^{(7–2)}
Loss	7–4	Apr 2024	Sarasota Open, US	Clay (green)	(Australia) Thanasi Kokkinakis	3–6, 6–1, 0–6
Win	8–4	Apr 2024	Tallahassee Tennis Challenger, US (2)	Clay (green)	(United States) Mitchell Krueger	6–4, 7–6^{(11–9)}
Loss	8–5	Apr 2026	Open Aix Provence, France	Clay	(Chile) Alejandro Tabilo	4–6, 6–4, 3–6

==== Doubles: 1 (title) ====
Result	W–L	Date	Tournament	Surface	Partner	Opponents	Score
Win	1–0	Mar 2023	Challenger Città di Lugano, Switzerland	Hard (i)	(Netherlands) David Pel	(Germany) Constantin Frantzen (Germany) Hendrik Jebens	6–2, 7–6^{(8–6)}

=== ITF Tour finals ===
Futures/World Tennis

==== Singles: 8 (4 titles, 4 runner-ups) ====
Finals by surface
Hard (3–2)
Clay (1–2)

Result	W–L	Date	Tournament	Surface	Opponent	Score
Win	1–0	Jan 2018	Turkey F2, Antalya	Hard	(Bulgaria) Dimitar Kuzmanov	6–3, 6–4
Win	2–0	May 2018	Poland F1, Wisła	Clay	(Czech Republic) Michael Vrbenský	3–6, 6–1, 6–2
Loss	2–1	Jul 2018	Belgium F2, Arlon	Clay	(Peru) Juan Pablo Varillas	6–7^{(6–8)}, 6–4, 1–6
Loss	2–2	Jul 2018	Belgium F5, Duinbergen	Clay	(Belgium) Jeroen Vanneste	6–7^{(2–7)}, 3–6
Win	3–2	Mar 2019	M15 Doha, Qatar	Hard	(Germany) Adrian Obert	6–4, 6–1
Loss	3–3	Jan 2020	M15 Monastir, Tunisia	Hard	(Portugal) Nuno Borges	4–6, 6–7^{(6–8)}
Loss	3–4	Feb 2020	M15 Heraklion, Greece	Hard	(Belgium) Clement Geens	6–3, 4–6, 1–6
Win	4–4	Nov 2020	M15 Bratislava, Slovakia	Hard (i)	(Russia) Bogdan Bobrov	6–4, 6–2

==== Doubles: 8 (4 titles, 4 runner-ups) ====
Finals by surface
Hard (3–2)
Clay (1–2)

Result	W–L	Date	Tournament	Surface	Partner	Opponents	Score
Loss	0–1	Mar 2018	Qatar F1, Doha	Hard	(Netherlands) Scott Griekspoor	(Belgium) Jonas Merckx (Sweden) Fred Simonsson	7–6^{(7–3)}, 3–6, [4–10]
Win	1–1	Mar 2018	Qatar F2, Doha	Hard	(Sweden) Fred Simonsson	(Czech Republic) Matěj Vocel (Czech Republic) Marek Gengel	6–4, 3–6, [10–6]
Loss	1–2	Jul 2018	Italy F12, Reggio Emilia	Clay	(France) Maxime Tabatruong	(Turkey) Tuna Altuna (Bulgaria) Alexandar Lazov	4–6, 2–6
Win	2–2	Mar 2019	M15 Doha, Qatar	Hard	(France) Geoffrey Blancaneaux	(Belgium) Arnaud Bovy (Netherlands) Jesper de Jong	6–2, 6–4
Win	3–2	Aug 2019	M15 Koksijde, Belgium	Clay	(France) Dan Added	(Belgium) Romain Barbosa (Belgium) Arnaud Bovy	6–4, 3–6, [10–3]
Loss	3–3	Oct 2019	M15 Benicarló, Spain	Clay	(Portugal) Tiago Cação	(Spain) Benjamín Winter López (Spain) Pablo Llamas Ruiz	3–6, 4–6
Win	4–3	Nov 2019	M15 Monastir, Tunisia	Clay	(Italy) Francesco Vilardo	(Tunisia) Aziz Dougaz (Zimbabwe) Benjamin Lock	6–3, 6–4
Loss	4–4	Dec 2019	M15 Doha, Qatar	Hard	(Georgia (country)) Zura Tkemaladze	(Sweden) Simon Freund (Sweden) Jonathan Mridha	1–6, 0–6

=== Wins over top 10 players ===
- Bergs has a 3–14 (17.65%) record against players who were, at the time the match was played, ranked in the top 10.

Season	2025	2026	Total
Wins	1	2	3

#	Player	Rk	Event	Surface	Rd	Score	Rk	Ref
2025
1.	Andrey Rublev	9	Miami Open, US	Hard	2R	7–5, 6–4	51	
2026
2.	(Canada) Félix Auger-Aliassime	5	United Cup, Australia	Hard	RR	6–4, 6–2	42	
3.	(Spain) Carlos Alcaraz	3	Shanghai Masters, China	Hard	3R	7–5, 7–6^{(7–4)}	39	

*As of 12 October 2026
