= Rei Sakamoto =

Japanese tennis player (born 2006)

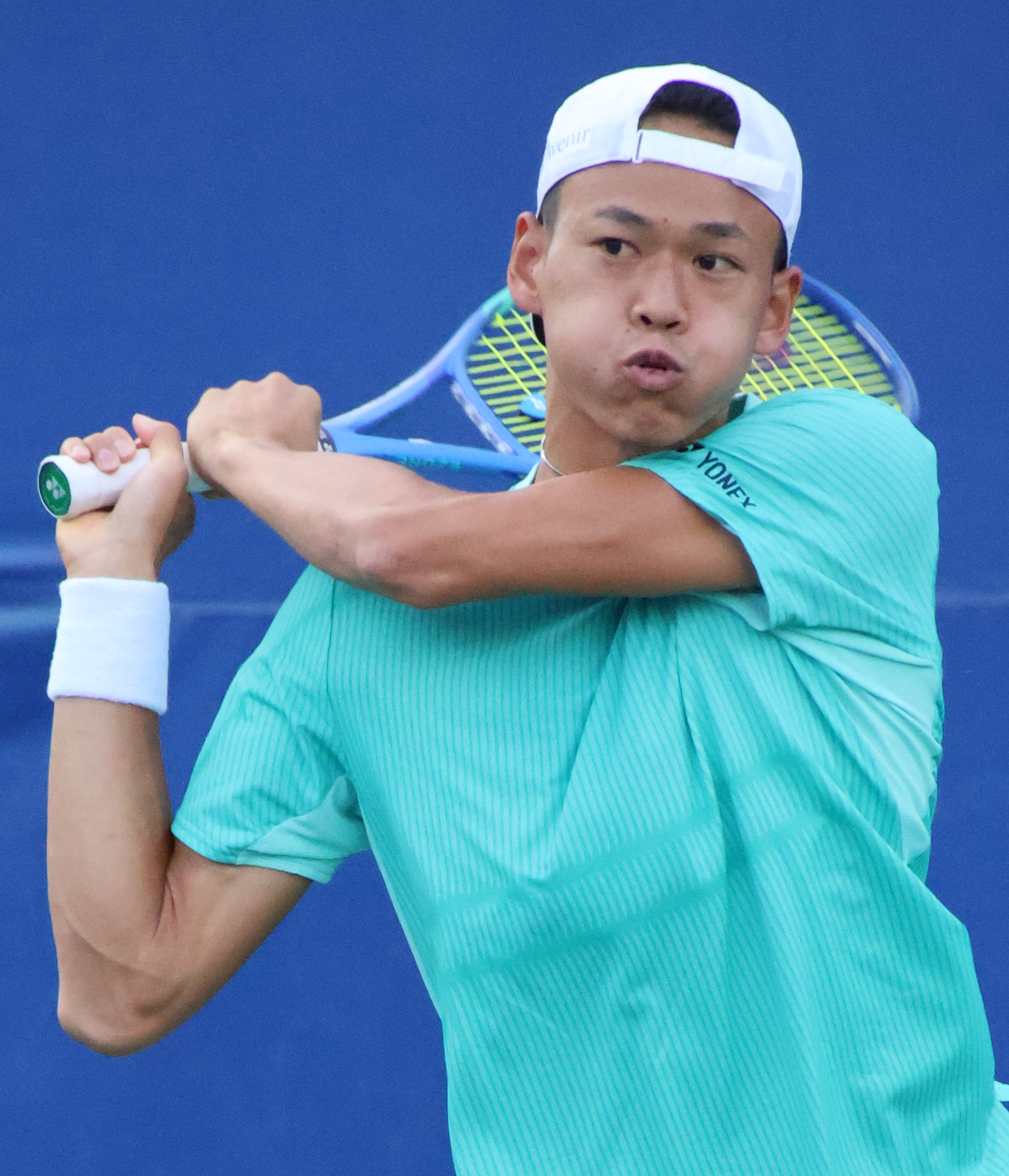
- Sakamoto in 2026
- Country (sports): Japan
- Born: 24 June 2006 (age 20) Nagoya, Japan
- Height: 1.93 m (6 ft 4 in)
- Plays: Right-handed (two-handed backhand)
- Coach: Federico Ricci
- Prize money: US $895,000

Singles
- Career record: 5–10 (at ATP Tour level, Grand Slam level, and in Davis Cup)
- Career titles: 0
- Highest ranking: No. 122 (9 November 2026)
- Current ranking: No. 122 (9 November 2026)

Grand Slam singles results
- Australian Open: 1R (2026)
- French Open: Q1 (2026)
- Wimbledon: Q3 (2026)
- US Open: 2R (2026)

Doubles
- Career record: 0–2
- Career titles: 0
- Highest ranking: No. 749 (13 April 2026)
- Current ranking: No. 799 (9 November 2026)
- Last updated on: 9 November 2026.

Rei Sakamoto (坂本怜, Sakamoto Rei; born 24 June 2006) is a Japanese professional tennis player. He has a career-high ATP singles ranking of No. 122 achieved on 9 November 2026 and a best doubles ranking of No. 749 achieved on 13 April 2026. He is currently the No. 3 singles player from Japan.

Sakamoto has won three singles titles on ATP Challenger Tour. He represents Japan at the Davis Cup.

== Junior tennis ==
Sakamoto had remarkable results on the ITF junior circuit, maintaining a 114–39 singles win-loss record. In March 2023, he earned the boys' doubles title at the Banana Bowl, a top junior-level event hosted in Criciúma, Brazil. Playing with Italian Federico Cinà as top-seeds, the pair defeated seventh seeds Daniil Sarksian and Yaroslav Demin in the final.

In January 2024, he won the J300 Traralgon International dropping only one set. He defeated second seed Nicolai Budkov Kjær in the final.

Later that month, Sakamoto won his most prestigious title at junior-level – the boys' singles event at the Australian Open, defeating Czech Jan Kumstát in the final.

He was also runner-up in the boys' doubles category at the 2024 French Open, with Federico Cinà. They lost to top seeds Nicolai Budkov Kjær and Joel Schwärzler in the final.

Later that season, Sakamoto was crowned a champion in doubles at the 2024 US Open, with Czech Maxim Mrva. The pair defeated Denis Peták and Flynn Thomas in the final.

He reached an ITF junior combined ranking of world No. 1 on 27 May 2024.

== Career ==
=== 2024: First Challenger title ===
In March, Sakamoto received a wildcard for qualifying competition at the Miami Open, an ATP 1000-level event, but lost to Czech Vít Kopřiva in the first round.

At the age of 18 and five months, Sakamoto won his first title at the 2024 Yokkaichi Challenger becoming the second youngest Japanese titlist after Kei Nishikori to lift an ATP Challenger trophy in history. As a result he reached the top 500 in the rankings on 2 December 2024.

=== 2025: Masters and top 175 debuts ===
Sakamoto received a wildcard for the qualifying competition at the 2025 Australian Open.

Sakamoto made his Masters main draw debut at the 2025 Miami Open after qualifying, but lost to Alexandre Müller.

He won his second Challenger title at 2025 Cary Tennis Classic and reached new career-high ranking of world No. 206 on 14 July 2025, rising 85 positions up in the singles rankings. Sakamoto made history with winning his third title at home in Yokohama, becoming the first Japanese teenager to win three Challenger titles. As a result he reached the top 175 in the singles rankings at world No. 159 on 24 November 2025.

=== 2026: Major debut, first ATP Tour and Masters wins ===
Sakamoto made his major debut at the 2026 Australian Open after qualifying for the main draw, but lost to fellow qualifier Rafael Jódar in the first round. Having received a wildcard for the 2026 Miami Open, Sakamoto recorded his first ATP and Masters win defeating Aleksandar Kovacevic.

== Performance timeline ==
Key
W	F	SF	QF	#R	RR	Q#	DNQ	A	NH

(W) winner; (F) finalist; (SF) semifinalist; (QF) quarterfinalist; (#R) rounds 4, 3, 2, 1; (RR) round-robin stage; (Q#) qualification round; (DNQ) did not qualify; (A) absent; (NH) not held; (SR) strike rate (events won / competed); (W–L) win–loss record.

=== Singles ===
Current through the 2026 US Open.

Tournament	2024	2025	2026	SR	W–L	Win%
Grand Slam tournaments
Australian Open	A	Q1	1R	0 / 1	0–1	0%
French Open	A	A	Q1	0 / 0	0–0	–
Wimbledon	A	A	Q3	0 / 0	0–0	–
US Open	A	Q2	2R	0 / 1	1–1	50%
Win–loss	0–0	0–0	1–2	0 / 2	1–2	33%
ATP 1000 tournaments
Indian Wells Open	A	A	Q1	0 / 0	0–0	–
Miami Open	Q1	1R	2R	0 / 2	1–2	33%
Monte-Carlo Masters	A	A	A	0 / 0	0–0	–
Madrid Open	A	A	Q2	0 / 0	0–0	–
Italian Open	A	A	A	0 / 0	0–0	–
Canadian Open	A	A	A	0 / 0	0–0	–
Cincinnati Open	A	A	A	0 / 0	0–0	–
Shanghai Masters	A	1R		0 / 1	0–1	0%
Paris Masters	A	A		0 / 0	0–0	–
Win–loss	0–0	0–2	1–1	0 / 3	1–3	25%

== ATP Challenger Tour finals ==
=== Singles: 3 (3 titles) ===
Legend ATP Challenger Tour (3–0)

Result	W–L	Date	Tournament	Tier	Surface	Opponent	Score
Win	1–0	Nov 2024	Yokkaichi Challenger, Japan	Challenger	Hard	(Germany) Christoph Negritu	1–6, 6–3, 6–4
Win	2–0	Jun 2025	Cary Tennis Classic, US	Challenger	Hard	(Canada) Liam Draxl	6–1, 6–4
Win	3–0	Nov 2025	Yokohama Challenger, Japan	Challenger	Hard	(Japan) Kaichi Uchida	4–6, 7–6^{(7–4)}, 6–4

== ITF World Tennis Tour finals ==
=== Doubles: 2 (1 title, 1 runner-up) ===
Legend ITF WTT (1–1)

Result	W–L	Date	Tournament	Tier	Surface	Partner	Opponents	Score
Win	1–0	Feb 2024	M15 Sharm El Sheikh, Egypt	WTT	Hard	(Czech Republic) Jan Hrazdil	(United Kingdom) Emile Hudd (United Kingdom) David Stevenson	6–3, 6–7^{(8–10)}, [11–9]
Loss	1–1	May 2024	M15 Cervia, Italy	WTT	Clay	(Italy) Federico Bondioli	(Italy) Gianluca Cadenasso (Italy) Jacopo Bilardo	walkover

== Junior Grand Slam finals ==
=== Singles: 1 (title) ===
Result	Year	Tournament	Surface	Opponent	Score
Win	2024	Australian Open	Hard	(Czech Republic) Jan Kumstát	3–6, 7–6^{(7–2)}, 7–5

=== Doubles: 2 (1 title, 1 runner-up) ===
Result	Year	Tournament	Surface	Partner	Opponents	Score
Loss	2024	French Open	Clay	(Italy) Federico Cinà	(Norway) Nicolai Budkov Kjær (Austria) Joel Schwärzler	4–6, 6–7^{(3–7)}
Win	2024	US Open	Hard	(Czech Republic) Maxim Mrva	(Czech Republic) Denis Peták (Switzerland) Flynn Thomas	7–5, 7–6^{(7–1)}
