= Yokkaichi Challenger =

ATP Challenger Tour
- Event name: Yokkaichi Challenger
- Location: Yokkaichi, Japan
- Venue: Yokkaichi Tennis Center
- Category: ATP Challenger 100 (2023)
- Surface: Hard
- Prize money: $82,000 (2024)

The Yokkaichi Challenger is a professional tennis tournament played on hardcourts. It is part of the ATP Challenger Tour. It is held in Yokkaichi, Japan since 2019.

== Past finals ==
=== Singles ===
| Year | Champion | Runner-up | Score |
|---|---|---|---|
| 2026 | (Japan) Rio Noguchi | (Japan) Yasutaka Uchiyama | 5–7, 7–6^{(7–5)}, 6–3 |
| 2025 | Not held | | |
| 2024 | (Japan) Rei Sakamoto | (Germany) Christoph Negritu | 1–6, 6–3, 6–4 |
| 2023 | (Belgium) Zizou Bergs | (United States) Michael Mmoh | 6–2, 7–6^{(7–2)} |
| 2022 | (Japan) Yosuke Watanuki | (Portugal) Frederico Ferreira Silva | 6–2, 6–2 |
| 2020–21 | Not held | | |
| 2019 | (Japan) Yūichi Sugita | (Australia) James Duckworth | 3–6, 6–3, 7–6^{(7–1)} |

=== Doubles ===
| Year | Champions | Runners-up | Score |
|---|---|---|---|
| 2026 | (China) Sun Fajing (Chinese Taipei) Wu Tung-lin | (Australia) Ethan Cook (Australia) Tai Sach | 7–6^{(8–6)}, 6–3 |
| 2025 | Not held | | |
| 2024 | (Australia) Thomas Fancutt (Switzerland) Jakub Paul | (Japan) Kokoro Isomura (Japan) Hikaru Shiraishi | 6–2, 7–5 |
| 2023 | (United States) Evan King (United States) Reese Stalder | (Chinese Taipei) Ray Ho (Australia) Calum Puttergill | 7–5, 6–4 |
| 2022 | (Chinese Taipei) Hsu Yu-hsiou (Japan) Yuta Shimizu | (Japan) Masamichi Imamura (Japan) Rio Noguchi | 7–6^{(7–2)}, 6–4 |
| 2020–21 | Not held | | |
| 2019 | (South Korea) Nam Ji-sung (South Korea) Song Min-kyu | (China) Gong Maoxin (China) Zhang Ze | 6–3, 3–6, [14–12] |
