= Masamichi Imamura =

Japanese tennis player (born 1998)

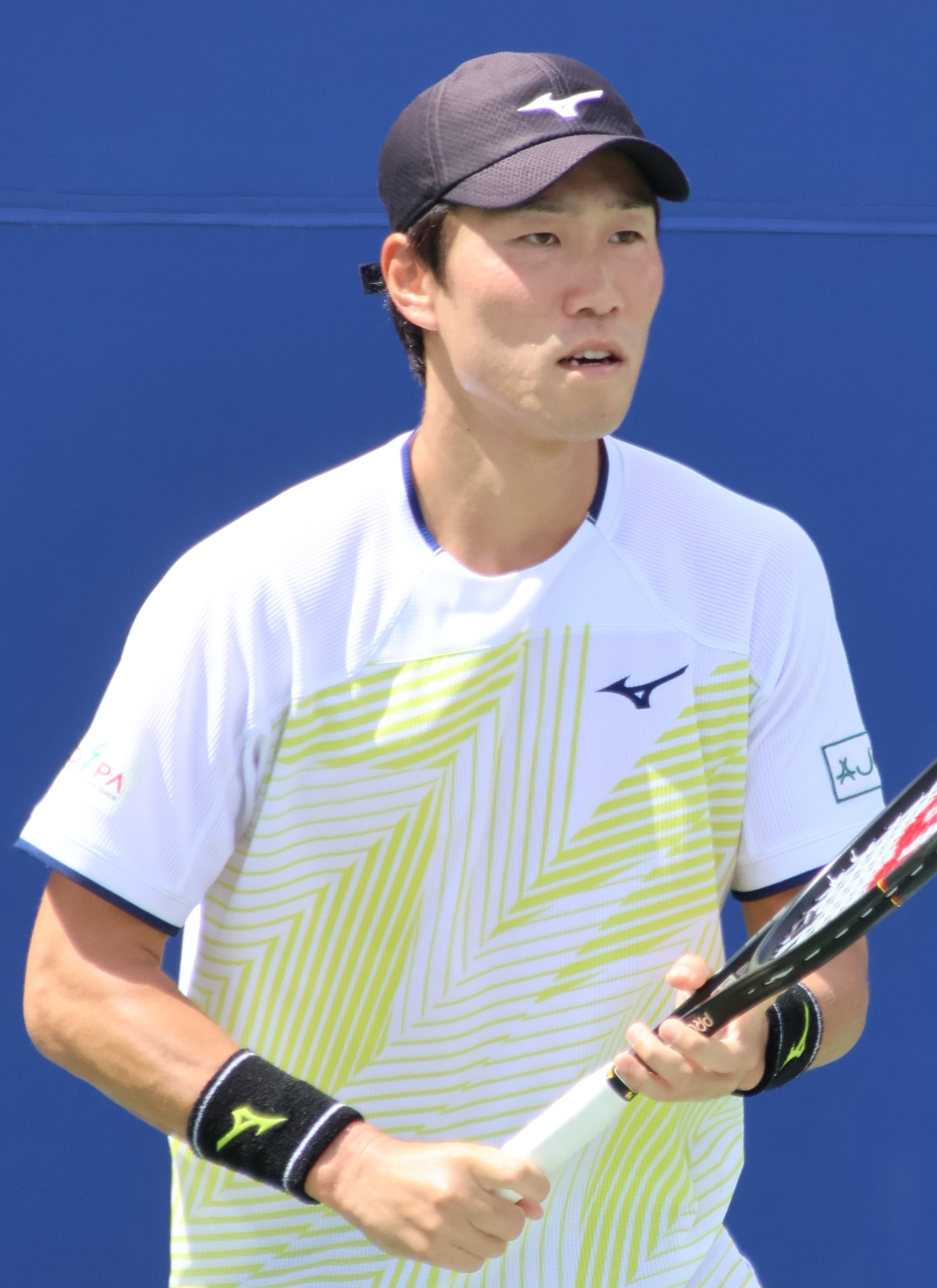
- Imamura in 2026
- Country (sports): Japan
- Born: 23 November 1998 (age 27) Osaka, Japan
- Height: 1.78 m (5 ft 10 in)
- Plays: Right-handed (two-handed backhand)
- Prize money: US $134,898

Singles
- Career record: 0–0 (at ATP Tour level, Grand Slam level, and in Davis Cup)
- Career titles: 0
- Highest ranking: No. 331 (3 March 2025)
- Current ranking: No. 411 (14 September 2026)

Doubles
- Career record: 0–1 (at ATP Tour level, Grand Slam level, and in Davis Cup)
- Career titles: 0
- Highest ranking: No. 211 (5 January 2026)
- Current ranking: No. 261 (14 September 2026)
- Last updated on: 16 September 2026.

Masamichi Imamura (今村昌倫, born 23 November 1998) is a Japanese tennis player. Imamura has a career high ATP singles ranking of No. 331 achieved on 3 March 2025 and a doubles ranking of No. 211 achieved on 5 January 2026.

Imamura made his ATP main draw debut at the 2023 Japan Open Tennis Championships after qualifying for the doubles main draw with Taisei Ichikawa.

== ATP Challenger Tour finals ==
=== Doubles: 6 (3 titles, 3 runner-ups) ===
Legend ATP Challenger Tour (3–3)

Result	W–L	Date	Tournament	Tier	Surface	Partner	Opponents	Score
Loss	0–1	Oct 2022	Yokohama, Japan	Challenger	Hard	(Japan) Tomoya Fujiwara	(Romania) Victor Vlad Cornea (Philippines) Ruben Gonzales	5–7, 3–6
Loss	0–2	Nov 2022	Yokkaichi, Japan	Challenger	Hard	(Japan) Rio Noguchi	(Chinese Taipei) Hsu Yu-hsiou (Japan) Yuta Shimizu	6–7^{(2–7)}, 4–6
Win	1–2	Feb 2025	New Delhi, India	Challenger	Hard	(Japan) Rio Noguchi	(India) Niki Kaliyanda Poonacha (Zimbabwe) Courtney John Lock	6–4, 6–3
Win	2–2	May 2025	Tbilisi, Georgia	Challenger	Hard	(Japan) Naoki Tajima	(India) Siddhant Banthia (India) Ramkumar Ramanathan	1–6, 6–3, [10–5]
Loss	2–3	Nov 2025	Yokohama, Japan	Challenger	Hard	(Japan) Ryuki Matsuda	(Austria) Neil Oberleitner (Czech Republic) Michael Vrbenský	6–7^{(6–8)}, 1–6
Win	3–3	Aug 2026	Astana, Kazakhstan	Challenger	Hard	(Japan) Taisei Ichikawa	Petr Bar Biryukov (Kazakhstan) Grigoriy Lomakin	3–6, 7–6(7–4), [10–5]
