= 2025 Gwangju Open – Doubles =

Doubles
- 2025 Gwangju Open

Final
- Champions: (Chinese Taipei) Ray Ho (Australia) Matthew Romios
- Runners-up: (United States) Vasil Kirkov (Netherlands) Bart Stevens
- Score: 6–3, 7–6^{(8–6)}

Events
Singles	Doubles
- Gwangju Open

Lee Jea-moon and Song Min-kyu were the defending champions but only Lee chose to defend his title, partnering Ann Suk. They lost in the first round to Ray Ho and Matthew Romios.

Ho and Romios won the title after defeating Vasil Kirkov and Bart Stevens 6–3, 7–6^{(8–6)} in the final.

== Seeds ==
1. (Chinese Taipei) Ray Ho / (Australia) Matthew Romios (champions)
2. (United States) Vasil Kirkov / (Netherlands) Bart Stevens (final)
3. (Australia) Blake Bayldon / (United States) Reese Stalder (quarterfinals)
4. (Israel) Daniel Cukierman / (United Kingdom) Joshua Paris (first round)

== Draw ==
Key

- Q = Qualifier
- WC = Wild card
- LL = Lucky loser
- Alt = Alternate
- ITF = ITF entry
- PR = Protected ranking
- SR = Special ranking
- SE = Special exempt
- JE = Junior exempt
- JR = Junior Accelerator Programme entrant
- CO = College Accelerator Programme entrant
- NG = Next Gen Accelerator Program entrant
- w/o = Walkover
- r = Retired
- d = Defaulted

=== Draw ===
First round
1	(Chinese Taipei) R Ho (Australia) MC Romios	6	6
WC	(South Korea) Ann Suk (South Korea) J-m Lee	3	2
(Chinese Taipei) Y-h Hsu (Japan) R Noguchi	2	6	[6]
WC	(South Korea) S-w Kwon (South Korea) U-s Park	6	1	[10]
4	(Israel) D Cukierman (United Kingdom) J Paris	2	4
(South Korea) J-s Nam (Japan) K Uesugi	6	6
(Japan) R Sakamoto (Japan) S Shimabukuro	6	7
(Australia) Je Delaney; A Kachmazov	4	5
(France) A Escoffier (France) L Sanchez	2	0
(India) R Ramanathan (China) A Wang	6	6
Alt	(South Korea) Jeong Yeong-seok (South Korea) Shin Woo-bin	3	4
3	(Australia) B Bayldon (United States) R Stalder	6	6
(China) F Sun (Japan) K Uchida	3	4
M Sharipov; I Simakin	6	6
(Australia) K Pearson (Japan) J Trotter	4	4
2	(United States) V Kirkov (Netherlands) B Stevens	6	6

Quarterfinals
1	(Chinese Taipei) R Ho (Australia) MC Romios	2	7	[10]
WC	(South Korea) S-w Kwon (South Korea) U-s Park	6	5	[7]
(South Korea) J-s Nam (Japan) K Uesugi	5	6	[6]
(Japan) R Sakamoto (Japan) S Shimabukuro	7	2	[10]
(India) R Ramanathan (China) A Wang	7^{7}	7^{7}
3	(Australia) B Bayldon (United States) R Stalder	6^{4}	6^{1}
M Sharipov; I Simakin	6	4	[6]
2	(United States) V Kirkov (Netherlands) B Stevens	3	6	[10]

Semifinals
1	(Chinese Taipei) R Ho (Australia) MC Romios	6	3	[10]
(Japan) R Sakamoto (Japan) S Shimabukuro	4	6	[7]
(India) R Ramanathan (China) A Wang	1	6^{1}
2	(United States) V Kirkov (Netherlands) B Stevens	6	7^{7}

Final
1	(Chinese Taipei) R Ho (Australia) MC Romios	6	7^{8}
2	(United States) V Kirkov (Netherlands) B Stevens	3	6^{6}
