= 2024 Gwangju Open – Singles =

Singles
- 2024 Gwangju Open

Final
- Champion: (South Africa) Lloyd Harris
- Runner-up: (China) Bu Yunchaokete
- Score: 6–2, 3–6, 6–4

Events
Singles	Doubles
← 2023 ·	Gwangju Open	· 2025 →

Jordan Thompson was the defending champion but chose not to defend his title.

Lloyd Harris won the title after defeating Bu Yunchaokete 6–2, 3–6, 6–4 in the final.

== Seeds ==
1. (Australia) James Duckworth (first round)
2. (Finland) Otto Virtanen (first round)
3. (Japan) Sho Shimabukuro (quarterfinals)
4. (Italy) Mattia Bellucci (first round)
5. (China) Bu Yunchaokete (final)
6. (South Africa) Lloyd Harris (champion)
7. (Australia) Li Tu (first round)
8. (Hong Kong) Coleman Wong (second round)

== Draw ==
=== Key ===
- Q = Qualifier
- WC = Wild card
- LL = Lucky loser
- Alt = Alternate
- SE = Special exempt
- PR = Protected ranking
- ITF = ITF entry
- JE = Junior exempt
- w/o = Walkover
- r = Retired
- d = Defaulted
- SR = Special ranking

=== Finals ===
Semifinals
5	(China) Bu Yunchaokete	4	6	7^{7}
(Lithuania) Ričardas Berankis	6	4	6^{5}
6	(South Africa) Lloyd Harris	6	6
Alt	(Chinese Taipei) Wu Tung-lin	4	4

Final
5	(China) Bu Yunchaokete	2	6	4
6	(South Africa) Lloyd Harris	6	3	6

=== Top half ===
First round
1	(Australia) J Duckworth	3	7^{8}	1
(Chinese Taipei) Y-h Hsu	6	6^{6}	6
(Australia) A Bolt	6	3	7^{7}
(France) Jules Marie	3	6	6^{4}
(United Kingdom) A Fery	6	3	6
Q	(China) F Sun	4	6	3
(Belgium) A Blockx	2^{r}
5	(China) Y Bu	3
4	(Italy) M Bellucci	6	1	5
(Australia) P Sekulic	0	6	7
(Estonia) M Lajal	6	6
Q	(South Korea) D-h Lee	1	1
(Lithuania) R Berankis	7^{8}	6
LL	E Gerasimov	6^{6}	1
Q	(Australia) J McCabe	4	6	6
7	(Australia) L Tu	6	4	1

Second round
(Chinese Taipei) Y-h Hsu	6	6
(Australia) A Bolt	4	4
(United Kingdom) A Fery	3	7^{10}	4^{r}
5	(China) Y Bu	6	6^{8}	4
(Australia) P Sekulic	6^{4}	4
(Estonia) M Lajal	7^{7}	6
(Lithuania) R Berankis	7^{8}	7^{8}
Q	(Australia) J McCabe	6^{6}	6^{6}

Quarterfinals
(Chinese Taipei) Y-h Hsu	5	3
5	(China) Y Bu	7	6
(Estonia) M Lajal	2	7^{7}	3
(Lithuania) R Berankis	6	6^{4}	6

Semifinals
5	(China) Y Bu	4	6	7^{7}
(Lithuania) R Berankis	6	4	6^{5}

=== Bottom half ===
First round
6	(South Africa) L Harris	6	6
Q	(Australia) L Saville	2	2
WC	(South Korea) Y-s Chung	6	4	6
Q	(United Kingdom) P Jubb	4	6	3
(Ukraine) I Marchenko	3	2
(South Korea) S-c Hong	6	6
WC	(South Korea) J-m Lee	3	2
3	(Japan) S Shimabukuro	6	6
8	(Hong Kong) C Wong	6^{6}	7	6
Q	(Tunisia) M Echargui	7^{8}	5	3
Alt	(Chinese Taipei) T-l Wu	4	6	6
(Australia) D Sweeny	6	3	3
(France) A Escoffier	5	4
A Kachmazov	7	6
WC	(South Korea) J-s Nam	6	6
2	(Finland) O Virtanen	4	3

Second round
6	(South Africa) L Harris	6	6
WC	(South Korea) Y-s Chung	4	4
(South Korea) S-c Hong	4	4
3	(Japan) S Shimabukuro	6	6
8	(Hong Kong) C Wong	3	6	5
Alt	(Chinese Taipei) T-l Wu	6	1	7
A Kachmazov	6	6
WC	(South Korea) J-s Nam	4	3

Quarterfinals
6	(South Africa) L Harris	6	6
3	(Japan) S Shimabukuro	1	3
Alt	(Chinese Taipei) T-l Wu	6	5	7^{7}
A Kachmazov	3	7	6^{3}

Semifinals
6	(South Africa) L Harris	6	6
Alt	(Chinese Taipei) T-l Wu	4	4
