= 2019 Gwangju Open – Doubles =

Doubles
- 2019 Gwangju Open

Final
- Champions: (Chinese Taipei) Hsieh Cheng-peng (Indonesia) Christopher Rungkat
- Runners-up: (South Korea) Nam Ji-sung (South Korea) Song Min-kyu
- Score: 6–3, 3–6, [10–6]

Events
Singles	Doubles
← 2018 ·	Gwangju Open	· 2022 →

Nam Ji-sung and Song Min-kyu were the defending champions but lost in the final to Hsieh Cheng-peng and Christopher Rungkat.

Hsieh and Rungkat won the title after defeating Nam and Song 6–3, 3–6, [10–6] in the final.

== Seeds ==
1. (Chinese Taipei) Hsieh Cheng-peng / (Indonesia) Christopher Rungkat (champions)
2. (India) Sriram Balaji / (Israel) Jonathan Erlich (semifinals)
3. (United States) Evan King / (United States) Nathan Pasha (quarterfinals)
4. (Sweden) André Göransson / (United States) Hunter Reese (semifinals)

== Draw ==
=== Key ===
- Q = Qualifier
- WC = Wild card
- LL = Lucky loser
- Alt = Alternate
- SE = Special exempt
- PR = Protected ranking
- ITF = ITF entry
- JE = Junior exempt
- w/o = Walkover
- r = Retired
- d = Defaulted
- SR = Special ranking

First round
1	(Chinese Taipei) C-p Hsieh (Indonesia) C Rungkat	6	7
(Japan) T Matsui (India) V Vardhan	2	5
(India) S Myneni (Canada) A Shamasdin	6	6
(Chinese Taipei) T-l Wu (Chinese Taipei) T-h Yang	2	3
4	(Sweden) A Göransson (United States) H Reese	6	6
(Chinese Taipei) J Jung (China) Xia Zihao	1	3
ITF	(Philippines) F Alcantara (Japan) Shintaro Imai	6^{4}	0
(Philippines) R Gonzales (Thailand) Sa Ratiwatana	7^{7}	6
WC	(South Korea) Han Seon-yong (South Korea) Kim Cheong-eui	3	2
WC	(South Korea) J-s Nam (South Korea) M-k Song	6	6
(Australia) M Banes (Australia) B Ellis	1	6^{4}
3	(United States) E King (United States) N Pasha	6	7^{7}
ITF	(China) Y Bai (Russia) K Kravchuk	3	1
WC	(South Korea) Ho Chung (South Korea) J-m Lee	6	6
(Australia) A Santillan (Australia) L Saville	3	1
2	(India) S Balaji (Israel) J Erlich	6	6

Quarterfinals
1	(Chinese Taipei) C-p Hsieh (Indonesia) C Rungkat	6	1	[10]
(India) S Myneni (Canada) A Shamasdin	4	6	[6]
4	(Sweden) A Göransson (United States) H Reese	6^{5}	7^{7}	[11]
(Philippines) R Gonzales (Thailand) Sa Ratiwatana	7^{7}	6^{3}	[9]
WC	(South Korea) J-s Nam (South Korea) M-k Song	6	6
3	(United States) E King (United States) N Pasha	4	0
WC	(South Korea) Ho Chung (South Korea) J-m Lee	3	3
2	(India) S Balaji (Israel) J Erlich	6	6

Semifinals
1	(Chinese Taipei) C-p Hsieh (Indonesia) C Rungkat	7^{7}	4	[16]
4	(Sweden) A Göransson (United States) H Reese	6^{2}	6	[14]
WC	(South Korea) J-s Nam (South Korea) M-k Song	3	6	[10]
2	(India) S Balaji (Israel) J Erlich	6	3	[7]

Final
1	(Chinese Taipei) C-p Hsieh (Indonesia) C Rungkat	6	3	[10]
WC	(South Korea) J-s Nam (South Korea) M-k Song	3	6	[6]
