= 2019 Gwangju Open – Singles =

Singles
- 2019 Gwangju Open

Final
- Champion: (Chinese Taipei) Jason Jung
- Runner-up: (Israel) Dudi Sela
- Score: 6–4, 6–2

Events
Singles	Doubles
← 2018 ·	Gwangju Open	· 2022 →

Maverick Banes was the defending champion but lost in the first round to Shintaro Imai.

Jason Jung won the title after defeating Dudi Sela 6–4, 6–2 in the final.

== Seeds ==
All seeds receive a bye into the second round.

1. (Lithuania) Ričardas Berankis (withdrew)
2. (Ukraine) Sergiy Stakhovsky (third round)
3. (Canada) Brayden Schnur (third round, retired)
4. (Russia) Evgeny Donskoy (quarterfinals)
5. (Chinese Taipei) Jason Jung (champion)
6. (South Korea) Kwon Soon-woo (semifinals)
7. (Slovakia) Lukáš Lacko (quarterfinals)
8. (Japan) Tatsuma Ito (second round, retired)
9. (Belgium) Ruben Bemelmans (third round)
10. (Japan) Yūichi Sugita (third round)
11. (Australia) Max Purcell (second round)
12. (Israel) Dudi Sela (final)
13. (China) Li Zhe (quarterfinals)
14. (Japan) Kaichi Uchida (second round)
15. (South Korea) Lee Duck-hee (second round)
16. (India) Saketh Myneni (second round)

== Draw ==
=== Key ===
- Q = Qualifier
- WC = Wild card
- LL = Lucky loser
- Alt = Alternate
- SE = Special exempt
- PR = Protected ranking
- ITF = ITF entry
- JE = Junior exempt
- w/o = Walkover
- r = Retired
- d = Defaulted
- SR = Special ranking

=== Finals ===
Quarterfinals
13	(China) Li Zhe	6	1	4
5	(Chinese Taipei) Jason Jung	3	6	6
(Australia) Akira Santillan	6	6
7	(Slovakia) Lukáš Lacko	4	3
12	(Israel) Dudi Sela	7^{7}	6
4	(Russia) Evgeny Donskoy	6^{4}	2
6	(South Korea) Kwon Soon-woo	6	6
(Chinese Taipei) Wu Tung-lin	1	0

Semifinals
5	(Chinese Taipei) Jason Jung	6	6
(Australia) Akira Santillan	4	3
12	(Israel) Dudi Sela	6	7
6	(South Korea) Kwon Soon-woo	4	5

Final
5	(Chinese Taipei) Jason Jung	6	6
12	(Israel) Dudi Sela	4	2

=== Top half ===
==== Section 1 ====
First round
(Bosnia and Herzegovina) A Šetkić	1	3
(India) S Mukund	6	6
ITF	(Japan) Shintaro Imai	3	6	6
(Australia) M Banes	6	4	2
Alt	(China) Xia Zihao	4	4
(Canada) F Peliwo	6	6
(United States) Evan Song	3	4
Q	(South Korea) M-k Song	6	6

Second round
Alt	(Japan) Y Takahashi	1	4
(India) S Mukund	6	6
ITF	(Japan) S Imai	3	1
13	(China) Z Li	6	6
9	(Belgium) R Bemelmans	7^{7}	6
(Canada) F Peliwo	6^{4}	2
Q	(South Korea) M-k Song	3	2
5	(Chinese Taipei) J Jung	6	6

Third round
(India) S Mukund	5	6^{4}
13	(China) Z Li	7	7^{7}
9	(Belgium) R Bemelmans	2	5
5	(Chinese Taipei) J Jung	6	7

Quarterfinals
13	(China) Z Li	6	1	4
5	(Chinese Taipei) J Jung	3	6	6

==== Section 2 ====
First round
(Australia) L Saville	6^{1}	6	7^{7}
(Austria) M Neuchrist	7^{7}	2	6^{2}
(Australia) A Santillan	6	6
ITF	(South Korea) Kim Cheong-eui	4	1
(Turkey) C İlkel	7	6
(United States) K King	5	2
ITF	(China) Y Bai	7^{7}	2	6
WC	(South Korea) Son Ji-hoon	6^{5}	6	3

Second round
3	(Canada) B Schnur	6	6^{3}	6
(Australia) L Saville	2	7^{7}	2
(Australia) A Santillan	6	6
16	(India) S Myneni	2	1
11	(Australia) M Purcell	1	7^{7}	5
(Turkey) C İlkel	6	6^{1}	7
ITF	(China) Y Bai	6^{6}	4
7	(Slovakia) L Lacko	7^{8}	6

Third round
3	(Canada) B Schnur	3	0^{r}
(Australia) A Santillan	6	3
(Turkey) C İlkel	6	0^{r}
7	(Slovakia) L Lacko	2	4

Quarterfinals
(Australia) A Santillan	6	6
7	(Slovakia) L Lacko	4	3

=== Bottom half ===
==== Section 3 ====
First round
WC	(South Korea) S-c Hong	6	6^{3}	2
ITF	(Russia) K Kravchuk	3	7^{7}	6
(China) D Wu	2	4
(United States) Roy Smith	6	6
WC	(South Korea) J-m Lee	6^{5}	2
(South Korea) Y-s Chung	7^{7}	6
Q	(Chinese Taipei) C-p Hsieh	6	5	3
(Japan) Makoto Ochi	4	7	6

Second round
8	(Japan) T Ito	3	1^{r}
ITF	(Russia) K Kravchuk	6	2
(United States) R Smith	0	2
12	(Israel) D Sela	6	6
15	(South Korea) D-h Lee	4	2
(South Korea) Y-s Chung	6	6
(Japan) M Ochi	3	4
4	(Russia) E Donskoy	6	6

Third round
ITF	(Russia) K Kravchuk	1	1
12	(Israel) D Sela	6	6
(South Korea) Y-s Chung	5	4
4	(Russia) E Donskoy	7	6

Quarterfinals
12	(Israel) D Sela	7^{7}	6
4	(Russia) E Donskoy	6^{4}	2

==== Section 4 ====
First round
(United States) E King	5	3
(United Kingdom) L Broady	7	6
WC	(South Korea) J-s Nam	6	6
ITF	(Japan) R Noguchi	2	1
(Chinese Taipei) T-l Wu	6	6
(China) Zh Zhang	3	3
(Chinese Taipei) T-h Yang	6	7^{10}
WC	(South Korea) J-w Na	3	6^{8}

Second round
6	(South Korea) S-w Kwon	6	7^{7}
(United Kingdom) L Broady	2	6^{2}
WC	(South Korea) J-s Nam	2	2
10	(Japan) Y Sugita	6	6
14	(Japan) K Uchida	1	4
(Chinese Taipei) T-l Wu	6	6
(Chinese Taipei) T-h Yang	4	6^{3}
2	(Ukraine) S Stakhovsky	6	7^{7}

Third round
6	(South Korea) S-w Kwon	6	6^{5}	6
10	(Japan) Y Sugita	4	7^{7}	4
(Chinese Taipei) T-l Wu	6	6
2	(Ukraine) S Stakhovsky	4	3

Quarterfinals
6	(South Korea) S-w Kwon	6	6
(Chinese Taipei) T-l Wu	1	0
