= 2024 Gwangju Open – Doubles =

Doubles
- 2024 Gwangju Open

Final
- Champions: (South Korea) Lee Jea-moon (South Korea) Song Min-kyu
- Runners-up: (China) Cui Jie (South Korea) Lee Duck-hee
- Score: 1–6, 6–1, [10–3]

Events
Singles	Doubles
← 2023 ·	Gwangju Open	· 2025 →

Evan King and Reese Stalder were the defending champions but chose not to defend their title.

Lee Jea-moon and Song Min-kyu won the title after defeating Cui Jie and Lee Duck-hee 1–6, 6–1, [10–3] in the final.

== Seeds ==
1. (Japan) Toshihide Matsui / (Japan) Kaito Uesugi (first round)
2. (Chinese Taipei) Ray Ho / (South Korea) Nam Ji-sung (first round)
3. (Philippines) Francis Alcantara / (China) Sun Fajing (first round)
4. (Australia) Alex Bolt / (Australia) Luke Saville (first round)

== Draw ==
=== Key ===
- Q = Qualifier
- WC = Wild card
- LL = Lucky loser
- Alt = Alternate
- SE = Special exempt
- PR = Protected ranking
- ITF = ITF entry
- JE = Junior exempt
- w/o = Walkover
- r = Retired
- d = Defaulted
- SR = Special ranking

=== Draw ===
First round
1	(Japan) T Matsui (Japan) K Uesugi	4	4
(Lithuania) R Berankis (Ukraine) I Marchenko	6	6
(South Korea) Shin San-hui (South Korea) Shin Woo-bin	6	1	[10]
(Australia) B Ellis (Australia) D Sweeny	4	6	[8]
3	(Philippines) FC Alcantara (China) F Sun	4	1
(Finland) P Niklas-Salminen (Hong Kong) C Wong	6	6
WC	(South Korea) J-m Lee (South Korea) M-k Song	6	6
(Japan) H Moriya (Japan) R Noguchi	1	3
E Gerasimov; Mikalai Haliak	4	4
(Italy) M Bellucci (Tunisia) M Echargui	6	6
WC	(China) J Cui (South Korea) D-h Lee	6	6
4	(Australia) A Bolt (Australia) L Saville	2	3
(France) A Escoffier (Chinese Taipei) T-l Wu	1	4
(Australia) J Delaney (Australia) L Tu	6	6
(South Korea) Y-s Chung (Chinese Taipei) Y-h Hsu	6	7^{7}
2	(Chinese Taipei) R Ho (South Korea) J-s Nam	4	6^{4}

Quarterfinals
(Lithuania) R Berankis (Ukraine) I Marchenko	6	6
(South Korea) S-h Shin (South Korea) W-b Shin	3	4
(Finland) P Niklas-Salminen (Hong Kong) C Wong	1	4
WC	(South Korea) J-m Lee (South Korea) M-k Song	6	6
(Italy) M Bellucci (Tunisia) M Echargui	3	3
WC	(China) J Cui (South Korea) D-h Lee	6	6
(Australia) J Delaney (Australia) L Tu	1	3
(South Korea) Y-s Chung (Chinese Taipei) Y-h Hsu	6	6

Semifinals
(Lithuania) R Berankis (Ukraine) I Marchenko	4	4
WC	(South Korea) J-m Lee (South Korea) M-k Song	6	6
WC	(China) J Cui (South Korea) D-h Lee	w/o
(South Korea) Y-s Chung (Chinese Taipei) Y-h Hsu

Final
WC	(South Korea) J-m Lee (South Korea) M-k Song	1	6	[10]
WC	(China) J Cui (South Korea) D-h Lee	6	1	[3]
