= 2019 Gwangju Open =

- Date: 13–19 May
- Edition: 4th
- Surface: Hard
- Location: Gwangju, South Korea

Champions

Singles
- (Chinese Taipei) Jason Jung

Doubles
- (Chinese Taipei) Hsieh Cheng-peng / (Indonesia) Christopher Rungkat
← 2018 ·	Gwangju Open	· 2022 →

The 2019 Gwangju Open was a professional tennis tournament played on hard courts. It was the 4th edition of the tournament which was part of the 2019 ATP Challenger Tour. It took place in Gwangju, South Korea between 13 and 19 May 2019.

== Singles main-draw entrants ==
=== Seeds ===
Country	Player	Rank^{1}	Seed
~~LTU~~	~~Ričardas Berankis~~	~~95~~	~~1~~
UKR	Sergiy Stakhovsky	114	2
CAN	Brayden Schnur	117	3
RUS	Evgeny Donskoy	128	4
TPE	Jason Jung	129	5
KOR	Kwon Soon-woo	135	6
SVK	Lukáš Lacko	151	7
JPN	Tatsuma Ito	160	8
BEL	Ruben Bemelmans	163	9
JPN	Yūichi Sugita	181	10
AUS	Max Purcell	236	11
ISR	Dudi Sela	239	12
CHN	Li Zhe	243	13
JPN	Kaichi Uchida	245	14
KOR	Lee Duck-hee	247	15
IND	Saketh Myneni	248	16

- ^{1} Rankings as of 6 May 2019.

=== Other entrants ===
The following players received wildcards into the singles main draw:

- (South Korea) Hong Seong-chan
- (South Korea) Lee Jea-moon
- (South Korea) Na Jung-woong
- (South Korea) Nam Ji-sung
- (South Korea) Son Ji-hoon

The following players received entry into the singles main draw using their ITF World Tennis Ranking:

- (China) Bai Yan
- (Japan) Shintaro Imai
- (South Korea) Kim Cheong-eui
- (Russia) Konstantin Kravchuk
- (Japan) Rio Noguchi

The following players received entry as alternates:

- (Japan) Yusuke Takahashi
- (China) Xia Zihao

The following players received entry from the qualifying draw:

- (Chinese Taipei) Hsieh Cheng-peng
- (South Korea) Song Min-kyu

== Champions ==
=== Singles ===
- (Chinese Taipei) Jason Jung def. (Israel) Dudi Sela 6–4, 6–2.

=== Doubles ===
- (Chinese Taipei) Hsieh Cheng-peng / (Indonesia) Christopher Rungkat def. (South Korea) Nam Ji-sung / (South Korea) Song Min-kyu 6–3, 3–6, [10–6].
