= 2018 Gwangju Open =

- Date: 13–19 August
- Edition: 3rd
- Surface: Hard
- Location: Gwangju, South Korea

Champions

Singles
- (Australia) Maverick Banes

Doubles
- (South Korea) Nam Ji-sung / (South Korea) Song Min-kyu
← 2017 ·	Gwangju Open	· 2019 →

The 2018 Gwangju Open was a professional tennis tournament played on hard courts. It was the 3rd edition of the tournament which was part of the 2018 ATP Challenger Tour. It took place in Gwangju, South Korea between 13 and 19 August 2018.

== Singles main-draw entrants ==
=== Seeds ===
Country	Player	Rank^{1}	Seed
ESP	Marcel Granollers	108	1
SUI	Henri Laaksonen	124	2
KAZ	Alexander Bublik	172	3
KOR	Lee Duck-hee	239	4
AUS	Akira Santillan	282	5
AUS	Maverick Banes	284	6
USA	Ulises Blanch	301	7
JPN	Renta Tokuda	307	8

- ^{1} Rankings as of 6 August 2018.

=== Other entrants ===
The following players received wildcards into the singles main draw:

- (South Korea) Chung Hong
- (South Korea) Jeong Yeong-seok
- (South Korea) Kim Cheong-eui
- (South Korea) Sin Dong-hak

The following player received entry into the singles main draw as an alternate:

- (Spain) Marcel Granollers

The following player received entry into the singles main draw as a special exempt:

- (China) Xia Zihao

The following players received entry from the qualifying draw:

- (China) He Yecong
- (South Korea) Nam Ji-sung
- (India) Sidharth Rawat
- (South Korea) Son Ji-hoon

== Champions ==
=== Singles ===
- (Australia) Maverick Banes def. (South Korea) Nam Ji-sung 6–3, 4–6, 6–4.

=== Doubles ===
- (South Korea) Nam Ji-sung / (South Korea) Song Min-kyu def. (Zimbabwe) Benjamin Lock / (New Zealand) Rubin Statham 5–7, 6–3, [10–5].
