= 2022 Gwangju Open – Singles =

Singles
- 2022 Gwangju Open

Final
- Champion: (Hungary) Zsombor Piros
- Runner-up: (Ecuador) Emilio Gómez
- Score: 6–2, 6–4

Events
Singles	Doubles
← 2019 ·	Gwangju Open	· 2023 →

Jason Jung was the defending champion but lost in the second round to Maximilian Marterer.

Zsombor Piros won the title after defeating Emilio Gómez 6–2, 6–4 in the final.

== Seeds ==
1. (Ecuador) Emilio Gómez (final)
2. (Australia) Christopher O'Connell (first round)
3. (Australia) John Millman (first round, retired)
4. (United States) Christopher Eubanks (semifinals)
5. (China) Wu Yibing (second round)
6. (United Kingdom) Ryan Peniston (second round)
7. (Hungary) Zsombor Piros (champion)
8. (Germany) Maximilian Marterer (quarterfinals)

== Draw ==
=== Key ===
- Q = Qualifier
- WC = Wild card
- LL = Lucky loser
- Alt = Alternate
- SE = Special exempt
- PR = Protected ranking
- ITF = ITF entry
- JE = Junior exempt
- w/o = Walkover
- r = Retired
- d = Defaulted
- SR = Special ranking

=== Finals ===
Semifinals
1	(Ecuador) Emilio Gómez	6	1	7^{7}
PR	(Australia) Marc Polmans	3	6	6^{3}
4	(United States) Christopher Eubanks	2	7^{8}	2
7	(Hungary) Zsombor Piros	6	6^{6}	6

Final
1	(Ecuador) Emilio Gómez	2	4
7	(Hungary) Zsombor Piros	6	6

=== Top half ===
First round
1	(Ecuador) E Gómez	7^{9}	6
(Israel) B Patael	6^{7}	2
Q	(India) M Sasikumar	4	6	7
WC	(South Korea) S-c Hong	6	1	5
Q	(South Korea) Y-s Chung	6	3	5
Q	(South Korea) J-s Nam	1	6	7
WC	(South Korea) Shin San-hui	3	2
5	(China) Y Wu	6	6
3	(Australia) J Millman	4	0^{r}
PR	(Australia) M Polmans	6	0
(Belgium) J De Loore	6	4	4
LL	(United States) K Smith	1	6	6
Q	(South Korea) D-h Lee	6	0	3
(Austria) M Neuchrist	4	6	6
Q	(Japan) N Nakagawa	5	7	3
6	(United Kingdom) R Peniston	7	5	6

Second round
1	(Ecuador) E Gómez	6	6
Q	(India) M Sasikumar	4	2
Q	(South Korea) J-s Nam	6	6
5	(China) Y Wu	4	2
PR	(Australia) M Polmans	6	2	6
LL	(United States) K Smith	4	6	3
(Austria) M Neuchrist	6	6
6	(United Kingdom) R Peniston	3	4

Quarterfinals
1	(Ecuador) E Gómez	6	1	6
Q	(South Korea) J-s Nam	1	6	1
PR	(Australia) M Polmans	4	6	6
(Austria) M Neuchrist	6	1	3

Semifinals
1	(Ecuador) E Gómez	6	1	7^{7}
PR	(Australia) M Polmans	3	6	6^{3}

=== Bottom half ===
First round
8	(Germany) M Marterer	6	3	7
(Czech Republic) M Gengel	3	6	5
(Colombia) N Barrientos	1	6	6^{6}
Q	(Chinese Taipei) J Jung	6	4	7^{8}
WC	(South Korea) U-s Park	6	3	6
(United Kingdom) J Clarke	3	6	2
(Tunisia) S Mansouri	1	5
4	(United States) C Eubanks	6	7
7	(Hungary) Z Piros	6	4	6
(Belgium) K Coppejans	4	6	2
(Australia) L Tu	6^{2}	7^{11}	6
(Chinese Taipei) T-l Wu	7^{7}	6^{9}	1
(United States) A Kovacevic	4	4
(Australia) R Hijikata	6	6
(Czech Republic) D Svrčina	6	6
2	(Australia) C O'Connell	4	2

Second round
8	(Germany) M Marterer	3	7	7
Q	(Chinese Taipei) J Jung	6	5	5
WC	(South Korea) U-s Park	2	2
4	(United States) C Eubanks	6	6
7	(Hungary) Z Piros	6	6
(Australia) L Tu	4	4
(Australia) R Hijikata	4	6	6
(Czech Republic) D Svrčina	6	3	2

Quarterfinals
8	(Germany) M Marterer	6^{1}	6^{1}
4	(United States) C Eubanks	7^{7}	7^{7}
7	(Hungary) Z Piros	6	6
(Australia) R Hijikata	2	1

Semifinals
4	(United States) C Eubanks	2	7^{8}	2
7	(Hungary) Z Piros	6	6^{6}	6
