= 2022 Gwangju Open – Doubles =

Doubles
- 2022 Gwangju Open

Final
- Champions: (Colombia) Nicolás Barrientos (Mexico) Miguel Ángel Reyes-Varela
- Runners-up: (India) Yuki Bhambri (India) Saketh Myneni
- Score: 2–6, 6–3, [10–6]

Events
Singles	Doubles
← 2019 ·	Gwangju Open	· 2023 →

Hsieh Cheng-peng and Christopher Rungkat were the defending champions but chose not to defend their title.

Nicolás Barrientos and Miguel Ángel Reyes-Varela won the title after defeating Yuki Bhambri and Saketh Myneni 2–6, 6–3, [10–6] in the final.

== Seeds ==
1. (Colombia) Nicolás Barrientos / (Mexico) Miguel Ángel Reyes-Varela (champions)
2. (United States) Robert Galloway / (United States) Alex Lawson (first round)
3. (India) Yuki Bhambri / (India) Saketh Myneni (final)
4. (Philippines) Ruben Gonzales / (Tunisia) Skander Mansouri (first round)

== Draw ==
=== Key ===
- Q = Qualifier
- WC = Wild card
- LL = Lucky loser
- Alt = Alternate
- SE = Special exempt
- PR = Protected ranking
- ITF = ITF entry
- JE = Junior exempt
- w/o = Walkover
- r = Retired
- d = Defaulted
- SR = Special ranking

First round
(Japan) N Tajima (Chinese Taipei) T-l Wu	6^{1}	4
WC	(South Korea) Jang Woo-hyeok (South Korea) Jeong Young-hoon	7^{7}	6
4	(Philippines) R Gonzales (Tunisia) S Mansouri	4	6^{5}
(South Korea) Y-s Chung (United States) A Kovacevic	6	7^{7}
WC	(South Korea) Bae Sang-woo (South Korea) Cho Seung-woo	6	6
(Japan) N Nakagawa (Japan) S Watanabe	3	4
(Czech Republic) M Gengel (Czech Republic) D Svrčina	6	6^{8}	[10]
(Australia) R Hijikata (Australia) L Tu	3	7^{10}	[7]
(South Korea) S-c Hong (South Korea) J-s Nam	4	3
3	(India) Y Bhambri (India) S Myneni	6	6
(Australia) M Polmans (United States) K Smith	3	2
(Belgium) K Coppejans (Belgium) J De Loore	6	6
(Germany) M Marterer (Austria) M Neuchrist	2	6	[10]
2	(United States) R Galloway (United States) A Lawson	6	2	[5]

Quarterfinals
1	(Colombia) N Barrientos (Mexico) MÁ Reyes-Varela	6	7^{7}
WC	(South Korea) W-h Jang (South Korea) Y-h Jeong	2	6^{2}
(South Korea) Y-s Chung (United States) A Kovacevic	1	6	[10]
WC	(South Korea) S-w Bae (South Korea) S-w Cho	6	3	[6]
(Czech Republic) M Gengel (Czech Republic) D Svrčina	6^{3}	4
3	(India) Y Bhambri (India) S Myneni	7^{7}	6
(Belgium) K Coppejans (Belgium) J De Loore	4	6	[2]
(Germany) M Marterer (Austria) M Neuchrist	6	3	[10]

Semifinals
1	(Colombia) N Barrientos (Mexico) MÁ Reyes-Varela	w/o
(South Korea) Y-s Chung (United States) A Kovacevic
3	(India) Y Bhambri (India) S Myneni	6	6
(Germany) M Marterer (Austria) M Neuchrist	3	2

Final
1	(Colombia) N Barrientos (Mexico) MÁ Reyes-Varela	2	6	[10]
3	(India) Y Bhambri (India) S Myneni	6	3	[6]
