= 2017 Gwangju Open – Doubles =

Doubles
- 2017 Gwangju Open

Final
- Champions: (Chinese Taipei) Chen Ti (Japan) Ben McLachlan
- Runners-up: (Australia) Jarryd Chaplin (Australia) Luke Saville
- Score: 2–6, 7–6^{(7–1)}, [10–1]

Events
Singles	Doubles
← 2016 ·	Gwangju Open	· 2018 →

Sanchai and Sonchat Ratiwatana were the defending champions but chose not to defend their title.

Chen Ti and Ben McLachlan won the title after defeating Jarryd Chaplin and Luke Saville 2–6, 7–6^{(7–1)}, [10–1] in the final.

== Seeds ==
1. (Chinese Taipei) Chen Ti / (Japan) Ben McLachlan (champions)
2. (Australia) Jarryd Chaplin / (Australia) Luke Saville (final)
3. (Japan) Yuya Kibi / (Japan) Toshihide Matsui (semifinals)
4. (South Korea) Chung Yun-seong / (South Korea) Kwon Soon-woo (semifinals)

== Draw ==
=== Key ===
- Q = Qualifier
- WC = Wild card
- LL = Lucky loser
- Alt = Alternate
- SE = Special exempt
- PR = Protected ranking
- ITF = ITF entry
- JE = Junior exempt
- w/o = Walkover
- r = Retired
- d = Defaulted
- SR = Special ranking

First round
(Netherlands) Miliaan Niesten (Egypt) M Safwat	6	3	[9]
(United States) M Giron (New Zealand) J Statham	4	6	[11]
4	(South Korea) Y-s Chung (South Korea) S-w Kwon	4	6	[10]
(Spain) N Kuhn (Japan) Yo Watanuki	6	3	[6]
WC	(South Korea) Kim Yu-seob (South Korea) Lee Tae-woo	6	7^{9}
WC	(South Korea) Jang Woo-hyeok (South Korea) D Yoo	4	6^{7}
WC	(South Korea) Lee Dae-hee (South Korea) Sin Dong-hak	2	6^{3}
(Italy) A Bega (Italy) Lorenzo Frigerio	6	7^{7}
(South Korea) S-c Hong (South Korea) Kim Young-seok	1	6	[7]
3	(Japan) Yuya Kibi (Japan) T Matsui	6	3	[10]
(Canada) S Diez (Spain) Bruno Mardones	7	6
(Japan) Masato Shiga (Japan) K Takeuchi	5	3

Quarterfinals
1	(Chinese Taipei) T Chen (Japan) B McLachlan	6	7
(United States) M Giron (New Zealand) J Statham	2	5
4	(South Korea) Y-s Chung (South Korea) S-w Kwon	6	7^{7}
WC	(South Korea) Yu-s Kim (South Korea) T-w Lee	1	6^{3}
(Italy) A Bega (Italy) L Frigerio	7	2	[6]
3	(Japan) Y Kibi (Japan) T Matsui	5	6	[10]
(Canada) S Diez (Spain) B Mardones	6	3	[6]
2	(Australia) Jarryd Chaplin (Australia) L Saville	2	6	[10]

Semifinals
1	(Chinese Taipei) T Chen (Japan) B McLachlan	2	6	[10]
4	(South Korea) Y-s Chung (South Korea) S-w Kwon	6	2	[7]
3	(Japan) Y Kibi (Japan) T Matsui	5	4
2	(Australia) J Chaplin (Australia) L Saville	7	6

Final
1	(Chinese Taipei) T Chen (Japan) B McLachlan	2	7^{7}	[10]
2	(Australia) J Chaplin (Australia) L Saville	6	6^{1}	[1]
