= 2025 Gwangju Open – Singles =

Singles
- 2025 Gwangju Open

Final
- Champion: (Australia) Jason Kubler
- Runner-up: Alibek Kachmazov
- Score: 7–5, 6–7^{(7–9)}, 6–3

Events
Singles	Doubles
← 2024 ·	Gwangju Open	· 2026 →

Lloyd Harris was the defending champion but chose not to defend his title.

Jason Kubler won the title after defeating Alibek Kachmazov 7–5, 6–7^{(7–9)}, 6–3 in the final.

== Seeds ==
1. (Australia) Adam Walton (second round)
2. (United States) Christopher Eubanks (first round)
3. (United States) Brandon Holt (quarterfinals)
4. (Australia) Tristan Schoolkate (semifinals)
5. (Australia) Li Tu (first round)
6. (Japan) James Trotter (second round)
7. (France) Térence Atmane (first round, retired)
8. (Australia) James McCabe (first round)

== Draw ==
=== Key ===
- Q = Qualifier
- WC = Wild card
- LL = Lucky loser
- Alt = Alternate
- ITF = ITF entry
- PR = Protected ranking
- SR = Special ranking
- SE = Special exempt
- JE = Junior exempt
- JR = Junior Accelerator Programme entrant
- CO = College Accelerator Programme entrant
- NG = Next Gen Accelerator Program entrant
- w/o = Walkover
- r = Retired
- d = Defaulted

=== Finals ===
Semifinals
PR	(Australia) Jason Kubler	7	6
4	(Australia) Tristan Schoolkate	5	4
(Japan) Yosuke Watanuki	4	3
Alibek Kachmazov	6	6

Final
PR	(Australia) Jason Kubler	7	6^{7}	6
Alibek Kachmazov	5	7^{9}	3

=== Top half ===
First round
1	(Australia) A Walton	6	6
Q	M Sharipov	3	2
PR	(Australia) J Kubler	6	6
WC	(South Korea) S-w Kwon	3	4
Q	(Japan) K Uchida	5	6	4
(Japan) Y Uchiyama	7	3	6
(France) H Grenier	6	6
5	(Australia) L Tu	4	2
4	(Australia) T Schoolkate	7^{7}	7
(Japan) R Sakamoto	6^{4}	5
(Finland) E Ruusuvuori	2	3
Q	I Simakin	6	6
(France) C Lestienne	1	4
WC	(South Korea) H Chung	6	6
LL	(Norway) V Durasovic	7^{7}	4	3
6	(Japan) J Trotter	6^{5}	6	6

Second round
1	(Australia) A Walton	4	1
PR	(Australia) J Kubler	6	6
(Japan) Y Uchiyama
(France) H Grenier	w/o
4	(Australia) T Schoolkate	6	6
Q	I Simakin	4	2
WC	(South Korea) H Chung	6	7^{7}
6	(Japan) J Trotter	2	6^{1}

Quarterfinals
PR	(Australia) J Kubler	6	6
(France) H Grenier	2	1
4	(Australia) T Schoolkate	6	6
WC	(South Korea) H Chung	3	1

Semifinals
PR	(Australia) J Kubler	7	6
4	(Australia) T Schoolkate	5	4

=== Bottom half ===
First round
8	(Australia) J McCabe	6^{12}	3
(Japan) Y Watanuki	7^{14}	6
(United States) Z Svajda	2	4
(United Kingdom) J Monday	6	6
Q	(South Korea) U-s Park	4	6	6
WC	(South Korea) Y-s Chung	6	3	4
Q	(Chinese Taipei) Y-h Hsu	3	0
3	(United States) B Holt	6	6
7	(France) T Atmane	6^{1}	0^{r}
A Kachmazov	7^{7}	0
Q	(Japan) R Noguchi	6	6
(Japan) S Shimabukuro	4	0
(China) Y Zhou	6^{2}	6	2
(Australia) O Jasika	7^{7}	4	6
(France) A Escoffier	6	6
2	(United States) C Eubanks	3	4

Second round
(Japan) Y Watanuki	6	6^{7}	6
(United Kingdom) J Monday	3	7^{9}	4
Q	(South Korea) U-s Park	6	3	6^{5}
3	(United States) B Holt	3	6	7^{7}
A Kachmazov	7^{7}	6
Q	(Japan) R Noguchi	6^{3}	4
(Australia) O Jasika	4	7	6
(France) A Escoffier	6	5	1

Quarterfinals
(Japan) Y Watanuki	7	7^{7}
3	(United States) B Holt	5	6^{2}
A Kachmazov	6	6
(Australia) O Jasika	4	2

Semifinals
(Japan) Y Watanuki	4	3
A Kachmazov	6	6
