= 2024 Gwangju Open =

- Date: 15–21 April
- Edition: 7th
- Surface: Hard
- Location: Gwangju, South Korea

Champions

Singles
- (South Africa) Lloyd Harris

Doubles
- (South Korea) Lee Jea-moon / (South Korea) Song Min-kyu
- Gwangju Open

The 2024 Gwangju Open was a professional tennis tournament played on hardcourts. It was the 7th edition of the tournament which was part of the 2024 ATP Challenger Tour. It took place in Gwangju, South Korea between 15 and 21 April 2024.

== Singles main-draw entrants ==
=== Seeds ===
Country	Player	Rank^{1}	Seed
AUS	James Duckworth	107	1
FIN	Otto Virtanen	159	2
JPN	Sho Shimabukuro	173	3
ITA	Mattia Bellucci	180	4
CHN	Bu Yunchaokete	181	5
RSA	Lloyd Harris	183	6
AUS	Li Tu	188	7
HKG	Coleman Wong	194	8

- ^{1} Rankings as of 8 April 2024.

=== Other entrants ===
The following players received wildcards into the singles main draw:

- (South Korea) Chung Yun-seong
- (South Korea) Lee Jea-moon
- (South Korea) Nam Ji-sung

The following player received entry into the singles main draw as an alternate:

- (Chinese Taipei) Wu Tung-lin

The following players received entry from the qualifying draw:

- (Tunisia) Moez Echargui
- (United Kingdom) Paul Jubb
- (South Korea) Lee Duck-hee
- (Australia) James McCabe
- (Australia) Luke Saville
- (China) Sun Fajing

The following player received entry as a lucky loser:

- Egor Gerasimov

== Champions ==
=== Singles ===
- (South Africa) Lloyd Harris def. (China) Bu Yunchaokete 6–2, 3–6, 6–4.

=== Doubles ===
- (South Korea) Lee Jea-moon / (South Korea) Song Min-kyu def. (China) Cui Jie / (South Korea) Lee Duck-hee 1–6, 6–1, [10–3].
