= 2018 Gwangju Open – Singles =

Singles
- 2018 Gwangju Open

Final
- Champion: (Australia) Maverick Banes
- Runner-up: (South Korea) Nam Ji-sung
- Score: 6–3, 4–6, 6–4

Events
Singles	Doubles
← 2017 ·	Gwangju Open	· 2019 →

Matthias Bachinger was the defending champion but chose not to defend his title.

Maverick Banes won the title after defeating Nam Ji-sung 6–3, 4–6, 6–4 in the final.

== Seeds ==
1. (Spain) Marcel Granollers (first round)
2. (Switzerland) Henri Laaksonen (first round)
3. (Kazakhstan) Alexander Bublik (semifinals)
4. (South Korea) Lee Duck-hee (quarterfinals)
5. (Australia) Akira Santillan (quarterfinals)
6. (Australia) Maverick Banes (champion)
7. (United States) Ulises Blanch (first round, retired)
8. (Japan) Renta Tokuda (quarterfinals, retired)

== Draw ==
=== Key ===
- Q = Qualifier
- WC = Wild card
- LL = Lucky loser
- Alt = Alternate
- SE = Special exempt
- PR = Protected ranking
- ITF = ITF entry
- JE = Junior exempt
- w/o = Walkover
- r = Retired
- d = Defaulted
- SR = Special ranking

=== Finals ===
Semifinals
6	(Australia) Maverick Banes	6	6
(Japan) Makoto Ochi	4	4
3	(Kazakhstan) Alexander Bublik	6^{7}	5
Q	(South Korea) Nam Ji-sung	7^{9}	7

Final
6	(Australia) Maverick Banes	6	4	6
Q	(South Korea) Nam Ji-sung	3	6	4

=== Top half ===
First round
1/Alt	(Spain) M Granollers	4	3
(Australia) A Popyrin	6	6
(Australia) B Mousley	6	6
Q	(South Korea) Son Ji-hoon	3	2
WC	(South Korea) Kim Cheong-eui	5	7^{7}	2
Q	(India) Sidharth Rawat	7	6^{5}	6
WC	(South Korea) Sin Dong-hak	2	1
6	(Australia) M Banes	6	6
4	(South Korea) D-h Lee	7^{7}	6
WC	(South Korea) Ho Chung	6^{4}	2
WC	(South Korea) Jeong Yeong-seok	4	0
(New Zealand) R Statham	6	6
(Monaco) L Catarina	3	2
(Japan) Makoto Ochi	6	6
(Australia) B Ellis	6	0
7	(United States) U Blanch	3	1^{r}

Second round
(Australia) A Popyrin	7^{7}	7^{7}
(Australia) B Mousley	6^{5}	6^{2}
Q	(India) S Rawat	3	3
6	(Australia) M Banes	6	6
4	(South Korea) D-h Lee	6	6
(New Zealand) R Statham	4	3
(Japan) M Ochi	7	6
(Australia) B Ellis	5	1

Quarterfinals
(Australia) A Popyrin	4	3
6	(Australia) M Banes	6	6
4	(South Korea) D-h Lee	2	1
(Japan) M Ochi	6	6

Semifinals
6	(Australia) M Banes	6	6
(Japan) M Ochi	4	4

=== Bottom half ===
First round
8	(Japan) Renta Tokuda	3	6	6
(India) S Mukund	6	2	3
(Russia) R Safiullin	6	2
Q	(China) Y He	2	0^{r}
(South Korea) Y-s Chung	4	6	3
(Zimbabwe) B Lock	6	4	6
(India) A Kadhe	6	6^{6}	6^{2}
3	(Kazakhstan) A Bublik	4	7^{8}	7^{7}
5	(Australia) A Santillan	6	3
(Spain) G Granollers	1	1^{r}
(Japan) Hiroyasu Ehara	1	6^{1}
(Egypt) K-M Maamoun	6	7^{7}
(Japan) Y Takahashi	2	6	2
SE	(China) Xia Zihao	6	1	6
Q	(South Korea) J-s Nam	6	6
2	(Switzerland) H Laaksonen	1	1

Second round
8	(Japan) R Tokuda	7^{7}	6
(Russia) R Safiullin	6^{3}	2
(Zimbabwe) B Lock	2	5
3	(Kazakhstan) A Bublik	6	7
5	(Australia) A Santillan	6	6
(Egypt) K-M Maamoun	3	2
SE	(China) Z Xia	2	3
Q	(South Korea) J-s Nam	6	6

Quarterfinals
8	(Japan) R Tokuda	1^{r}
3	(Kazakhstan) A Bublik	3
5	(Australia) A Santillan	2	3
Q	(South Korea) J-s Nam	6	6

Semifinals
3	(Kazakhstan) A Bublik	6^{7}	5
Q	(South Korea) J-s Nam	7^{9}	7
