= 2016 Gwangju Open – Singles =

Singles
- 2016 Gwangju Open

Final
- Champions: (Lithuania) Ričardas Berankis
- Runners-up: (Slovenia) Grega Žemlja
- Score: 6–3, 6–2

Events
Singles	Doubles
Gwangju Open	· 2017 →

This was the first edition of the tournament.

Ričardas Berankis won the title, defeating Grega Žemlja 6–3, 6–2 in the final.

== Seeds ==
1. (Lithuania) Ričardas Berankis (champion)
2. (Japan) Tatsuma Ito (semifinals)
3. (Japan) Go Soeda (first round)
4. (China) Wu Di (semifinals)
5. (United States) Alexander Sarkissian (first round)
6. (Slovenia) Grega Žemlja (final)
7. (China) Bai Yan (first round)
8. (China) Li Zhe (first round)

== Draw ==
=== Key ===
- Q = Qualifier
- WC = Wild card
- LL = Lucky loser
- Alt = Alternate
- SE = Special exempt
- PR = Protected ranking
- ITF = ITF entry
- JE = Junior exempt
- w/o = Walkover
- r = Retired
- d = Defaulted
- SR = Special ranking

=== Finals ===
Semifinals
1	(Lithuania) Ričardas Berankis	6	6
4	(China) Wu Di	4	1
6	(Slovenia) Grega Žemlja	6	6
2	(Japan) Tatsuma Ito	4	3

Final
1	(Lithuania) Ričardas Berankis	6	6
6	(Slovenia) Grega Žemlja	3	2

=== Top half ===
First round
1	(Lithuania) R Berankis	6	6
Q	(Australia) G Jones	3	1
WC	(South Korea) S-w Kwon	6	6
(Denmark) F Nielsen	3	4
WC	(South Korea) Y-s Chung	4	2
WC	(South Korea) Y-k Lim	6	6
WC	(South Korea) H Chung	4	7^{7}	6
7	(China) Y Bai	6	6^{1}	2
4	(China) D Wu	6^{5}	6	6
(South Korea) S-c Hong	7^{7}	4	2
Q	(United Kingdom) L Broady	6	6
(South Korea) Kim Cheong-eui	2	3
(Czech Republic) V Šafránek	5	2
(United States) D Nguyen	7	6
(South Korea) D-h Lee	0	6	7
8	(China) Z Li	6	4	5

Second round
1	(Lithuania) R Berankis	6	6
WC	(South Korea) S-w Kwon	4	0
WC	(South Korea) Y-k Lim	5	2
WC	(South Korea) H Chung	7	6
4	(China) D Wu	6	6
Q	(United Kingdom) L Broady	1	1
(United States) D Nguyen	4	6	2
(South Korea) D-h Lee	6	4	6

Quarterfinals
1	(Lithuania) R Berankis	6	6
WC	(South Korea) H Chung	4	2
4	(China) D Wu	6	6
(South Korea) D-h Lee	1	3

Semifinals
1	(Lithuania) R Berankis	6	6
4	(China) D Wu	4	1

=== Bottom half ===
First round
6	(Slovenia) G Žemlja	6	6
Q	(Thailand) W Trongcharoenchaikul	3	2
(Chinese Taipei) J Jung	2	7^{7}	6
(Italy) M Viola	6	6^{5}	3
(Republic of Ireland) S Barry	6	3	6^{6}
(Australia) M Reid	3	6	7^{8}
(Poland) M Przysiężny	3	6	7^{7}
3	(Japan) G Soeda	6	2	6^{5}
5	(United States) A Sarkissian	6	2	4
(Australia) M Matosevic	4	6	6
(Germany) Jeremy Jahn	5	6	6
(Italy) R Ghedin	7	1	1
(South Korea) Kim Young-seok	5	6	2
Q	(Australia) Gavin van Peperzeel	7	3	6
LL	(South Korea) D Yoo	2	4
2	(Japan) T Ito	6	6

Second round
6	(Slovenia) G Žemlja	2	6	6
(Chinese Taipei) J Jung	6	2	3
(Australia) M Reid	6	3	7^{7}
(Poland) M Przysiężny	4	6	6^{1}
(Australia) M Matosevic	1	7^{7}	5
(Germany) J Jahn	6	6^{2}	7
Q	(Australia) G van Peperzeel	2	4
2	(Japan) T Ito	6	6

Quarterfinals
6	(Slovenia) G Žemlja	6	6
(Australia) M Reid	1	2
(Germany) J Jahn
2	(Japan) T Ito	w/o

Semifinals
6	(Slovenia) G Žemlja	6	6
2	(Japan) T Ito	4	3
