= 2016 Gwangju Open – Doubles =

Doubles
- 2016 Gwangju Open

Final
- Champion: (Thailand) Sanchai Ratiwatana (Thailand) Sonchat Ratiwatana
- Runner-up: (Denmark) Frederik Nielsen (Republic of Ireland) David O'Hare
- Score: 6–3, 6–2

Events
Singles	Doubles
Gwangju Open	· 2017 →

This was the first edition of the tournament.

Sanchai and Sonchat Ratiwatana won the title, defeating Frederik Nielsen and David O'Hare 6–3, 6–2 in the final.

== Seeds ==
1. (Thailand) Sanchai Ratiwatana / (Thailand) Sonchat Ratiwatana (champions)
2. (China) Bai Yan / (Italy) Riccardo Ghedin (quarterfinals)
3. (United States) James Cerretani / (United States) Max Schnur (semifinals)
4. (Denmark) Frederik Nielsen / (Republic of Ireland) David O'Hare (final)

== Draw ==
=== Key ===
- Q = Qualifier
- WC = Wild card
- LL = Lucky loser
- Alt = Alternate
- SE = Special exempt
- PR = Protected ranking
- ITF = ITF entry
- JE = Junior exempt
- w/o = Walkover
- r = Retired
- d = Defaulted
- SR = Special ranking

First round
1	(Thailand) Sa Ratiwatana (Thailand) So Ratiwatana	6	6
(Chinese Taipei) J Jung (China) Z Li	3	4
(South Korea) D-h Lee (Australia) Gavin van Peperzeel	6	6
(United Kingdom) L Broady (Australia) M Reid	4	3
3	(United States) J Cerretani (United States) M Schnur	6^{2}	6	[10]
(Chinese Taipei) C-p Hsieh (Chinese Taipei) H-y Peng	7^{7}	3	[4]
(Republic of Ireland) S Barry (New Zealand) B McLachlan	6	1	[5]
WC	(South Korea) Kim Young-seok (South Korea) Y-k Lim	3	6	[10]
(India) J Nedunchezhiyan (United States) D Nguyen	6	7^{7}
WC	(South Korea) H Chung (South Korea) D Yoo	0	6^{4}
(Australia) Jarryd Chaplin (United States) A Sarkissian	5	2
4	(Denmark) F Nielsen (Republic of Ireland) D O'Hare	7	6
(Czech Republic) V Šafránek (Italy) M Viola	3	0
WC	(South Korea) Y-s Chung (South Korea) S-w Kwon	6	6
(Japan) T Matsui (Japan) G Soeda	6	6^{6}	[9]
2	(China) Y Bai (Italy) R Ghedin	3	7^{8}	[11]

Quarterfinals
1	(Thailand) Sa Ratiwatana (Thailand) So Ratiwatana	6	6
(South Korea) D-h Lee (Australia) G van Peperzeel	3	1
3	(United States) J Cerretani (United States) M Schnur	6	6
WC	(South Korea) Y-s Kim (South Korea) Y-k Lim	4	4
(India) J Nedunchezhiyan (United States) D Nguyen	6	4	[10]
4	(Denmark) F Nielsen (Republic of Ireland) D O'Hare	3	6	[12]
WC	(South Korea) Y-s Chung (South Korea) S-w Kwon	7	6
2	(China) Y Bai (Italy) R Ghedin	5	2

Semifinals
1	(Thailand) Sa Ratiwatana (Thailand) So Ratiwatana	6	7
3	(United States) J Cerretani (United States) M Schnur	2	5
4	(Denmark) F Nielsen (Republic of Ireland) D O'Hare	6	6
WC	(South Korea) Y-s Chung (South Korea) S-w Kwon	3	0

Final
1	(Thailand) Sa Ratiwatana (Thailand) So Ratiwatana	6	6
4	(Denmark) F Nielsen (Republic of Ireland) D O'Hare	3	2
