= 2016 Gwangju Open =

Tennis tournament in South Korea

- Date: 11–17 April
- Edition: 1st
- Surface: Hard
- Location: Gwangju, South Korea

Champions

Singles
- (Lithuania) Ričardas Berankis

Doubles
- (Thailand) Sanchai Ratiwatana / (Thailand) Sonchat Ratiwatana
Gwangju Open	· 2017 →

The 2016 Gwangju Open was a professional tennis tournament played on hard courts. It was the 1st edition of the tournament which was part of the 2016 ATP Challenger Tour. It took place in Gwangju, South Korea between 11 and 17 April 2016.

== Singles main-draw entrants ==
=== Seeds ===
Country	Player	Rank^{1}	Seed
LTU	Ričardas Berankis	83	1
JPN	Tatsuma Ito	115	2
JPN	Go Soeda	126	3
CHN	Wu Di	152	4
USA	Alexander Sarkissian	157	5
SLO	Grega Žemlja	187	6
CHN	Bai Yan	202	7
CHN	Li Zhe	210	8

- ^{1} Rankings as of April 4, 2016.

=== Other entrants ===
The following players received wildcards into the singles main draw:

- (South Korea) Kwon Soon-woo
- (South Korea) Chung Yun-seong
- (South Korea) Lim Yong-kyu
- (South Korea) Chung Hong

The following players received entry from the qualifying draw:

- (United Kingdom) Liam Broady
- (Australia) Greg Jones
- (Australia) Gavin van Peperzeel
- (Thailand) Wishaya Trongcharoenchaikul

The following player received entry as a lucky loser:

- (South Korea) Daniel Yoo

== Champions ==
=== Singles ===
- (Lithuania) Ričardas Berankis def. (Slovenia) Grega Žemlja, 6–3, 6–2

=== Doubles ===
- (Thailand) Sanchai Ratiwatana / (Thailand) Sonchat Ratiwatana def. (Denmark) Frederik Nielsen / (Republic of Ireland) David O'Hare, 6–3, 6–2
