= 2023 Gwangju Open =

- Date: 1–7 May
- Edition: 6th
- Surface: Hard
- Location: Gwangju, South Korea

Champions

Singles
- (Australia) Jordan Thompson

Doubles
- (United States) Evan King / (United States) Reese Stalder
| ← 2022 · | Gwangju Open | · 2024 → |

The 2023 Gwangju Open was a professional tennis tournament played on hardcourts. It was the 6th edition of the tournament which was part of the 2023 ATP Challenger Tour. It took place in Gwangju, South Korea between 1 and 7 May 2023.

== Singles main-draw entrants ==
=== Seeds ===
| Country | Player | Rank^{1} | Seed |
|---|---|---|---|
| AUS | Max Purcell | 89 | 1 |
| USA | Christopher Eubanks | 90 | 2 |
| AUS | Jordan Thompson | 91 | 3 |
| AUS | James Duckworth | 102 | 4 |
| ECU | Emilio Gómez | 115 | 5 |
| AUS | Rinky Hijikata | 141 | 6 |
| AUS | Aleksandar Vukic | 142 | 7 |
| USA | Denis Kudla | 146 | 8 |

- ^{1} Rankings as of 24 April 2023.

=== Other entrants ===
The following players received wildcards into the singles main draw:

- (South Korea) Chung Yun-seong
- (South Korea) Park Ui-sung
- (South Korea) Shin San-hui

The following players received entry into the singles main draw as alternates:

- (China) Bu Yunchaokete
- Evgeny Donskoy
- (Japan) Yuta Shimizu

The following players received entry from the qualifying draw:

- (Germany) Peter Gojowczyk
- (Australia) Omar Jasika
- (Chinese Taipei) Jason Jung
- (Germany) Daniel Masur
- (Czech Republic) Dominik Palán
- (Australia) Luke Saville

== Champions ==
=== Singles ===
- (Australia) Jordan Thompson def. (Australia) Max Purcell 6–3, 6–2.

=== Doubles ===
- (United States) Evan King / (United States) Reese Stalder def. (Australia) Andrew Harris / (Australia) John-Patrick Smith 6–4, 6–2.
