= 2022 Gwangju Open =

- Date: 3–9 October
- Edition: 5th
- Surface: Hard
- Location: Gwangju, South Korea

Champions

Singles
- (Hungary) Zsombor Piros

Doubles
- (Colombia) Nicolás Barrientos / (Mexico) Miguel Ángel Reyes-Varela
← 2019 ·	Gwangju Open	· 2023 →

The 2022 Gwangju Open was a professional tennis tournament played on hardcourts. It was the 5th edition of the tournament which was part of the 2022 ATP Challenger Tour. It took place in Gwangju, South Korea between 3 and 9 October 2022.

== Singles main-draw entrants ==
=== Seeds ===
Country	Player	Rank^{1}	Seed
ECU	Emilio Gómez	102	1
AUS	Christopher O'Connell	105	2
AUS	John Millman	108	3
USA	Christopher Eubanks	131	4
CHN	Wu Yibing	132	5
GBR	Ryan Peniston	140	6
HUN	Zsombor Piros	158	7
GER	Maximilian Marterer	160	8

- ^{1} Rankings as of 26 September 2022.

=== Other entrants ===
The following players received wildcards into the singles main draw:

- (South Korea) Hong Seong-chan
- (South Korea) Park Ui-sung
- (South Korea) Shin San-hui

The following player received entry into the singles main draw using a protected ranking:

- (Australia) Marc Polmans

The following players received entry from the qualifying draw:

- (South Korea) Chung Yun-seong
- (Chinese Taipei) Jason Jung
- (South Korea) Lee Duck-hee
- (Japan) Naoki Nakagawa
- (South Korea) Nam Ji-sung
- (India) Mukund Sasikumar

The following player received entry as a lucky loser:

- (United States) Keegan Smith

== Champions ==
=== Singles ===
- (Hungary) Zsombor Piros def. (Ecuador) Emilio Gómez 6–2, 6–4.

=== Doubles ===
- (Colombia) Nicolás Barrientos / (Mexico) Miguel Ángel Reyes-Varela def. (India) Yuki Bhambri / (India) Saketh Myneni 2–6, 6–3, [10–6].
