= 2017 Gwangju Open – Singles =

Singles
- 2017 Gwangju Open

Final
- Champion: (Germany) Matthias Bachinger
- Runner-up: (Chinese Taipei) Yang Tsung-hua
- Score: 6–3, 6–4

Events
Singles	Doubles
← 2016 ·	Gwangju Open	· 2018 →

Ričardas Berankis was the defending champion but chose not to defend his title.

Matthias Bachinger won the title after defeating Yang Tsung-hua 6–3, 6–4 in the final.

== Seeds ==
1. (Australia) Jordan Thompson (withdrew)
2. (Canada) Peter Polansky (semifinals)
3. (Australia) Matthew Ebden (second round)
4. (South Korea) Lee Duck-hee (quarterfinals)
5. (Japan) Tatsuma Ito (semifinals)
6. (Japan) Yasutaka Uchiyama (first round)
7. (Japan) Hiroki Moriya (first round)
8. (South Korea) Kwon Soon-woo (quarterfinals)
9. (Egypt) Mohamed Safwat (second round)

== Draw ==
=== Key ===
- Q = Qualifier
- WC = Wild card
- LL = Lucky loser
- Alt = Alternate
- SE = Special exempt
- PR = Protected ranking
- ITF = ITF entry
- JE = Junior exempt
- w/o = Walkover
- r = Retired
- d = Defaulted
- SR = Special ranking

=== Finals ===
Semifinals
5	(Japan) Tatsuma Ito	6^{3}	3
(Germany) Matthias Bachinger	7^{7}	6
Q	(Chinese Taipei) Yang Tsung-hua	6	5	6
2	(Canada) Peter Polansky	4	7	2

Final
(Germany) Matthias Bachinger	6	6
Q	(Chinese Taipei) Yang Tsung-hua	3	4

=== Top half ===
First round
9	(Egypt) M Safwat	7^{7}	6
(Australia) O Jasika	6^{4}	3
LL	(Italy) Lorenzo Frigerio	3	4
(Canada) S Diez	6	6
(Chinese Taipei) T Chen	2	2
PR	(United States) B Klahn	6	6
(Australia) M Polmans	1	1
5	(Japan) T Ito	6	6
4	(South Korea) D-h Lee	7^{7}	6
Q	(Japan) Yuya Kibi	6^{4}	2
WC	(South Korea) Park Jun-sang	1	0
(Italy) A Bega	6	6
WC	(South Korea) S-c Hong	6	4	6^{2}
(Australia) L Saville	2	6	7^{7}
(Germany) M Bachinger	6	7^{7}
6	(Japan) Y Uchiyama	3	6^{5}

Second round
9	(Egypt) M Safwat	2	4
(Canada) S Diez	6	6
PR	(United States) B Klahn	5	6	3
5	(Japan) T Ito	7	1	6
4	(South Korea) D-h Lee	6	6
(Italy) A Bega	4	3
(Australia) L Saville	3	4
(Germany) M Bachinger	6	6

Quarterfinals
(Canada) S Diez	2	4
5	(Japan) T Ito	6	6
4	(South Korea) D-h Lee	3	5
(Germany) M Bachinger	6	7

Semifinals
5	(Japan) T Ito	6^{3}	3
(Germany) M Bachinger	7^{7}	6

=== Bottom half ===
First round
7	(Japan) H Moriya	3	4
(New Zealand) J Statham	6	6
(Japan) Shuichi Sekiguchi	5	6^{4}
Q	(Chinese Taipei) T-h Yang	7	7^{7}
Q	(Australia) M Matosevic	6	0	6
WC	(South Korea) Kim Cheong-eui	3	6	4
WC	(South Korea) Sin Dong-hak	5	3
3	(Australia) M Ebden	7	6
8	(South Korea) S-w Kwon	6	6
(Japan) T Niki	4	1
(Japan) Y Takahashi	6	5	3
Q	(Japan) Makoto Ochi	3	7	6
(United States) M Giron	6	7^{8}
(Spain) N Kuhn	4	6^{6}
LL	(Japan) K Takeuchi	2	4
2	(Canada) P Polansky	6	6

Second round
(New Zealand) J Statham	7^{7}	5	1
Q	(Chinese Taipei) T-h Yang	6^{5}	7	6
Q	(Australia) M Matosevic	6	4	7
3	(Australia) M Ebden	3	6	5
8	(South Korea) S-w Kwon	1	6	6
Q	(Japan) M Ochi	6	1	0
(United States) M Giron	4	6	6^{3}
2	(Canada) P Polansky	6	3	7^{7}

Quarterfinals
Q	(Chinese Taipei) T-h Yang	6	7^{7}
Q	(Australia) M Matosevic	1	6^{3}
8	(South Korea) S-w Kwon	6	4	6^{6}
2	(Canada) P Polansky	2	6	7^{8}

Semifinals
Q	(Chinese Taipei) T-h Yang	6	5	6
2	(Canada) P Polansky	4	7	2
