= 2018 Gwangju Open – Doubles =

Doubles
- 2018 Gwangju Open

Final
- Champions: (South Korea) Nam Ji-sung (South Korea) Song Min-kyu
- Runners-up: (Zimbabwe) Benjamin Lock (New Zealand) Rubin Statham
- Score: 5–7, 6–3, [10–5]

Events
| Singles | Doubles |
- Gwangju Open

Chen Ti and Ben McLachlan were the defending champions but chose not to defend their title.

Nam Ji-sung and Song Min-kyu won the title after defeating Benjamin Lock and Rubin Statham 5–7, 6–3, [10–5] in the final.

== Seeds ==
1. (Spain) Gerard Granollers / (Australia) Bradley Mousley (first round)
2. (Russia) Mikhail Elgin / (Belarus) Yaraslav Shyla (first round)
3. (India) Arjun Kadhe / (Japan) Toshihide Matsui (quarterfinals)
4. (Croatia) Ivan Sabanov / (Croatia) Matej Sabanov (first round)

== Draw ==
Key

- Q = Qualifier
- WC = Wild card
- LL = Lucky loser
- Alt = Alternate
- ITF = ITF entry
- PR = Protected ranking
- SR = Special ranking
- SE = Special exempt
- JE = Junior exempt
- JR = Junior Accelerator Programme entrant
- CO = College Accelerator Programme entrant
- NG = Next Gen Accelerator Program entrant
- w/o = Walkover
- r = Retired
- d = Defaulted

First round
1 | (Spain) G Granollers (Australia) B Mousley | 6 | 3 | [7]
Q | (Japan) Hiroyasu Ehara (Japan) Y Takahashi | 1 | 6 | [10]
(Kazakhstan) A Bublik (Russia) A Pavlioutchenkov | 3 | 3
(Monaco) L Catarina (Russia) R Safiullin | 6 | 6
3 | (India) A Kadhe (Japan) T Matsui | 7^{7} | 7
WC | (South Korea) Ho Chung (South Korea) Noh Sang-woo | 6^{2} | 5
LL | (Chinese Taipei) Y-h Hsu (Bulgaria) V Mladenov | 4 | 5
(Zimbabwe) B Lock (New Zealand) R Statham | 6 | 7
WC | (South Korea) Kim Cheong-eui (South Korea) J-w Na | 5 | 3
(Japan) Makoto Ochi (Japan) Renta Tokuda | 7 | 6
(South Korea) Y-s Chung (Japan) Shintaro Imai | 6 | 4 | [10]
4 | (Croatia) I Sabanov (Croatia) M Sabanov | 3 | 6 | [4]
(Spain) M Granollers (India) S Mukund | 4 | 5
(China) X Gao (China) F Sun | 6 | 7
WC | (South Korea) J-s Nam (South Korea) M-k Song | 6 | 4 | [10]
2 | (Russia) M Elgin (Belarus) Y Shyla | 4 | 6 | [4]

Quarterfinals
Q | (Japan) H Ehara (Japan) Y Takahashi | 2 | 5
(Monaco) L Catarina (Russia) R Safiullin | 6 | 7
3 | (India) A Kadhe (Japan) T Matsui | 2 | 5
(Zimbabwe) B Lock (New Zealand) R Statham | 6 | 7
(Japan) M Ochi (Japan) R Tokuda | 7 | 6
(South Korea) Y-s Chung (Japan) S Imai | 5 | 2
(China) X Gao (China) F Sun | 4 | 4
WC | (South Korea) J-s Nam (South Korea) M-k Song | 6 | 6

Semifinals
(Monaco) L Catarina (Russia) R Safiullin | 0 | 3
(Zimbabwe) B Lock (New Zealand) R Statham | 6 | 6
(Japan) M Ochi (Japan) R Tokuda
WC | (South Korea) J-s Nam (South Korea) M-k Song | w/o

Final
(Zimbabwe) B Lock (New Zealand) R Statham | 7 | 3 | [5]
WC | (South Korea) J-s Nam (South Korea) M-k Song | 5 | 6 | [10]
