= 2023 Gwangju Open – Doubles =

Doubles
- 2023 Gwangju Open

Final
- Champions: (United States) Evan King (United States) Reese Stalder
- Runners-up: (Australia) Andrew Harris (Australia) John-Patrick Smith
- Score: 6–4, 6–2

Events
Singles	Doubles
- Gwangju Open

Nicolás Barrientos and Miguel Ángel Reyes-Varela were the defending champions but chose not to defend their title.

Evan King and Reese Stalder won the title after defeating Andrew Harris and John-Patrick Smith 6–4, 6–2 in the final.

== Seeds ==
1. (Australia) Andrew Harris / (Australia) John-Patrick Smith (final)
2. (United States) Evan King / (United States) Reese Stalder (champions)
3. (India) Anirudh Chandrasekar / (India) Vijay Sundar Prashanth (semifinals)
4. (Australia) Luke Saville / (Australia) Tristan Schoolkate (withdrew)

== Draw ==
Key

- Q = Qualifier
- WC = Wild card
- LL = Lucky loser
- Alt = Alternate
- ITF = ITF entry
- PR = Protected ranking
- SR = Special ranking
- SE = Special exempt
- JE = Junior exempt
- JR = Junior Accelerator Programme entrant
- CO = College Accelerator Programme entrant
- NG = Next Gen Accelerator Program entrant
- w/o = Walkover
- r = Retired
- d = Defaulted

First round
1	(Australia) A Harris (Australia) J-P Smith	6	6^{5}	[11]
(Japan) S Shimabukuro (Japan) K Uchida	3	7^{7}	[9]
(Ecuador) E Gómez (United States) B Holt	2	3
(Japan) T Matsui (Japan) K Uesugi	6	6
Alt	(New Zealand) A Rai (China) Y Bu	6^{3}	5
(Philippines) R Gonzales (Japan) Y Shimizu	7^{7}	7
WC	(South Korea) Choe Jae-sung (South Korea) U-s Park	4	2
(India) A Kadhe (South Korea) J-s Nam	6	6
(Chinese Taipei) Y-h Hsu (Chinese Taipei) T-l Wu	6	6
WC	(South Korea) Lee Tae-woo (South Korea) Sim Seong-bin	3	4
(Turkey) A Çelikbilek (Turkey) C İlkel	5	4
3	(India) A Chandrasekar (India) VS Prashanth	7	6
(Australia) D Kelly (Australia) M Purcell	6	7
(Australia) R Hijikata (Australia) L Tu	2	5
(Canada) G Diallo (Australia) A Vukic	4	4
2	(United States) E King (United States) R Stalder	6	6

Quarterfinals
1	(Australia) A Harris (Australia) J-P Smith	7	6
(Japan) T Matsui (Japan) K Uesugi	5	4
(Philippines) R Gonzales (Japan) Y Shimizu	0	1
(India) A Kadhe (South Korea) J-s Nam	6	6
(Chinese Taipei) Y-h Hsu (Chinese Taipei) T-l Wu	7	5	[4]
3	(India) A Chandrasekar (India) VS Prashanth	5	7	[10]
(Australia) D Kelly (Australia) M Purcell	3	6	[6]
2	(United States) E King (United States) R Stalder	6	3	[10]

Semifinals
1	(Australia) A Harris (Australia) J-P Smith	6	6^{5}	[10]
(India) A Kadhe (South Korea) J-s Nam	4	7^{7}	[7]
3	(India) A Chandrasekar (India) VS Prashanth	4	3
2	(United States) E King (United States) R Stalder	6	6

Final
1	(Australia) A Harris (Australia) J-P Smith	4	2
2	(United States) E King (United States) R Stalder	6	6
