= 2017 Gwangju Open =

- Date: 18–24 September
- Edition: 2nd
- Surface: Hard
- Location: Gwangju, South Korea

Champions

Singles
- (Germany) Matthias Bachinger

Doubles
- (Chinese Taipei) Chen Ti / (Japan) Ben McLachlan
| ← 2016 · | Gwangju Open | · 2018 → |

The 2017 Gwangju Open was a professional tennis tournament played on hard courts. It was the 2nd edition of the tournament which was part of the 2017 ATP Challenger Tour. It took place in Gwangju, South Korea between 18 and 24 September 2017.

== Singles main-draw entrants ==
=== Seeds ===
| Country | Player | Rank^{1} | Seed |
|---|---|---|---|
| ~~AUS~~ | ~~Jordan Thompson~~ | ~~70~~ | ~~1~~ |
| CAN | Peter Polansky | 128 | 2 |
| AUS | Matthew Ebden | 140 | 3 |
| KOR | Lee Duck-hee | 163 | 4 |
| JPN | Tatsuma Ito | 165 | 5 |
| JPN | Yasutaka Uchiyama | 197 | 6 |
| JPN | Hiroki Moriya | 199 | 7 |
| KOR | Kwon Soon-woo | 208 | 8 |
| EGY | Mohamed Safwat | 211 | 9 |

- ^{1} Rankings as of 11 September 2017.

=== Other entrants ===
The following players received wildcards into the singles main draw:

- (South Korea) Hong Seong-chan
- (South Korea) Kim Cheong-eui
- (South Korea) Park Jun-sang
- (South Korea) Sin Dong-hak

The following players received entry into the singles main draw using a protected ranking:

- (United States) Bradley Klahn

The following players received entry from the qualifying draw:

- (Japan) Yuya Kibi
- (Australia) Marinko Matosevic
- (Japan) Makoto Ochi
- (Chinese Taipei) Yang Tsung-hua

The following players received entry as lucky losers:

- (Italy) Lorenzo Frigerio
- (Japan) Kento Takeuchi

== Champions ==
=== Singles ===
- (Germany) Matthias Bachinger def. (Chinese Taipei) Yang Tsung-hua 6–3, 6–4.

=== Doubles ===
- (Chinese Taipei) Chen Ti / (Japan) Ben McLachlan def. (Australia) Jarryd Chaplin / (Australia) Luke Saville 2–6, 7–6^{(7–1)}, [10–1].
