= 2023 Gwangju Open – Singles =

Singles
- 2023 Gwangju Open

Final
- Champion: (Australia) Jordan Thompson
- Runner-up: (Australia) Max Purcell
- Score: 6–3, 6–2

Events
Singles	Doubles
- Gwangju Open

Zsombor Piros was the defending champion but chose not to defend his title.

Jordan Thompson won the title after defeating Max Purcell 6–3, 6–2 in the final.

== Seeds ==
1. (Australia) Max Purcell (final)
2. (United States) Christopher Eubanks (semifinals)
3. (Australia) Jordan Thompson (champion)
4. (Australia) James Duckworth (second round)
5. (Ecuador) Emilio Gómez (quarterfinals)
6. (Australia) Rinky Hijikata (quarterfinals)
7. (Australia) Aleksandar Vukic (second round)
8. (United States) Denis Kudla (first round)

== Draw ==
Key

- Q = Qualifier
- WC = Wild card
- LL = Lucky loser
- Alt = Alternate
- ITF = ITF entry
- PR = Protected ranking
- SR = Special ranking
- SE = Special exempt
- JE = Junior exempt
- JR = Junior Accelerator Programme entrant
- CO = College Accelerator Programme entrant
- NG = Next Gen Accelerator Program entrant
- w/o = Walkover
- r = Retired
- d = Defaulted

=== Finals ===
Semifinals
1	(Australia) Max Purcell	6	6
(Australia) Marc Polmans	0	2
3	(Australia) Jordan Thompson	7^{7}	6
2	(United States) Christopher Eubanks	6^{3}	3

Final
1	(Australia) Max Purcell	3	2
3	(Australia) Jordan Thompson	6	6

=== Top half ===
First round
1	(Australia) M Purcell	6	6
(Lithuania) R Berankis	3	2
Q	(Australia) L Saville	6	6
Q	(Germany) P Gojowczyk	3	4
Q	(Czech Republic) D Palán	6	6
(Chinese Taipei) Y-h Hsu	2	3
(Turkey) A Çelikbilek	3	2
5	(Ecuador) E Gómez	6	6
4	(Australia) J Duckworth	6	6
Q	(Australia) O Jasika	3	1
(Australia) M Polmans	2	7	6
Alt	(Japan) Y Shimizu	6	5	4
WC	(South Korea) Y-s Chung	7^{7}	6
(Japan) K Uchida	6^{4}	3
Q	(Chinese Taipei) J Jung	6	6^{1}	6
8	(United States) D Kudla	3	7^{7}	3

Second round
1	(Australia) M Purcell	6	6
Q	(Australia) L Saville	2	2
Q	(Czech Republic) D Palán	3	2
5	(Ecuador) E Gómez	6	6
4	(Australia) J Duckworth	3	6^{5}
(Australia) M Polmans	6	7^{7}
WC	(South Korea) Y-s Chung	6	3	4
Q	(Chinese Taipei) J Jung	3	6	6

Quarterfinals
1	(Australia) M Purcell	6	7^{7}
5	(Ecuador) E Gómez	2	6^{3}
(Australia) M Polmans	6	6
Q	(Chinese Taipei) J Jung	4	3

Semifinals
1	(Australia) M Purcell	6	6
(Australia) M Polmans	0	2

=== Bottom half ===
First round
6	(Australia) R Hijikata	6	6
(Canada) G Diallo	2	4
(Chinese Taipei) T-l Wu	3	2
(Australia) L Tu	6	6
Alt	E Donskoy	6	6
Q	(Germany) D Masur	3	1
WC	(South Korea) U-s Park	1	7^{7}	0
3	(Australia) J Thompson	6	6^{3}	6
7	(Australia) A Vukic	7	7^{7}
(Japan) S Shimabukuro	5	6^{2}
Alt	(China) Y Bu	6	6
WC	(South Korea) Shin San-hui	4	1
(Turkey) C İlkel	6	0	1
(United States) B Holt	3	6	6
(South Africa) L Harris	6^{3}	6	4
2	(United States) C Eubanks	7^{7}	4	6

Second round
6	(Australia) R Hijikata	6	7^{7}
(Australia) L Tu	4	6^{3}
Alt	E Donskoy	2	4
3	(Australia) J Thompson	6	6
7	(Australia) A Vukic	4	6^{4}
Alt	(China) Y Bu	6	7^{7}
(United States) B Holt	2	1
2	(United States) C Eubanks	6	6

Quarterfinals
6	(Australia) R Hijikata	4	4
3	(Australia) J Thompson	6	6
Alt	(China) Y Bu	3	2
2	(United States) C Eubanks	6	6

Semifinals
3	(Australia) J Thompson	7^{7}	6
2	(United States) C Eubanks	6^{3}	3
