= 2025 Gwangju Open =

- Date: 21–27 April
- Edition: 8th
- Surface: Hard
- Location: Gwangju, South Korea

Champions

Singles
- (Australia) Jason Kubler

Doubles
- (Chinese Taipei) Ray Ho / (Australia) Matthew Romios
- Gwangju Open

The 2025 Gwangju Open was a professional tennis tournament played on hardcourts. It was the 8th edition of the tournament which was part of the 2025 ATP Challenger Tour. It took place in Gwangju, South Korea between 21 and 27 April 2025.

== Singles main-draw entrants ==
=== Seeds ===
Country	Player	Rank^{1}	Seed
AUS	Adam Walton	86	1
USA	Christopher Eubanks	110	2
USA	Brandon Holt	116	3
AUS	Tristan Schoolkate	120	4
AUS	Li Tu	172	5
JPN	James Trotter	176	6
FRA	Térence Atmane	177	7
AUS	James McCabe	181	8

- ^{1} Rankings as of 14 April 2025.

=== Other entrants ===
The following players received wildcards into the singles main draw:

- (South Korea) Chung Hyeon
- (South Korea) Chung Yun-seong
- (South Korea) Kwon Soon-woo

The following player received entry into the singles main draw using a protected ranking:

- (Australia) Jason Kubler

The following players received entry from the qualifying draw:

- (Chinese Taipei) Hsu Yu-hsiou
- (Japan) Rio Noguchi
- (South Korea) Park Ui-sung
- Marat Sharipov
- Ilia Simakin
- (Japan) Kaichi Uchida

The following player received entry as a lucky loser:

- (Norway) Viktor Durasovic

== Champions ==
=== Singles ===
- (Australia) Jason Kubler def. Alibek Kachmazov 7–5, 6–7^{(7–9)}, 6–3.

=== Doubles ===
- (Chinese Taipei) Ray Ho / (Australia) Matthew Romios def. (United States) Vasil Kirkov / (Netherlands) Bart Stevens 6–3, 7–6^{(8–6)}.
