= Alibek Kachmazov =

Russian tennis player (born 2002)

Alibek Kachmazov Алибек Качмазов
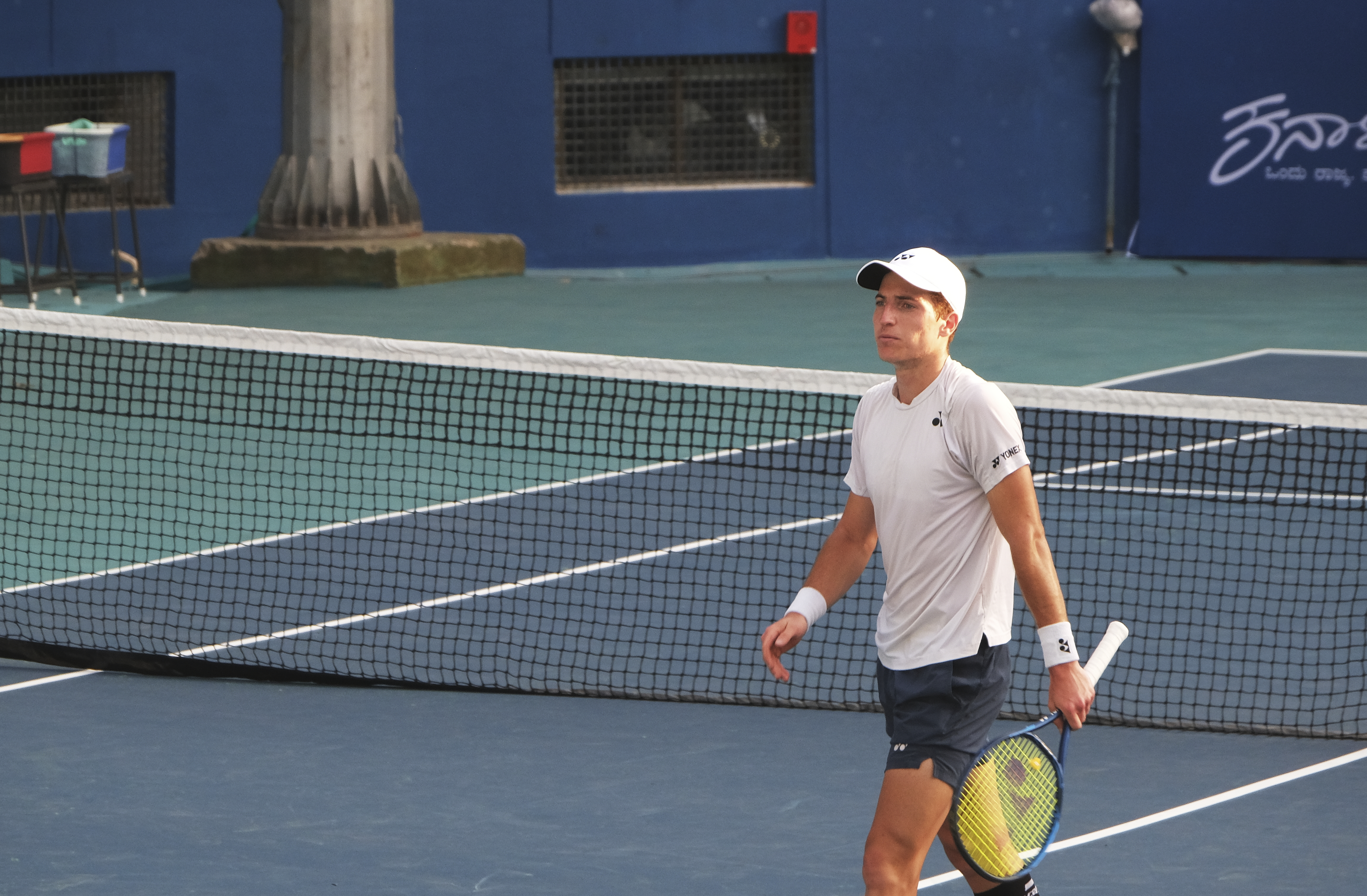
- Alibek Kachmazov at the 2023 Bengaluru Open
- Full name: Alibek Muratovich Kachmazov
- Country (sports): Russia
- Born: 17 August 2002 (age 24) Vladikavkaz, Russia
- Height: 1.85 m (6 ft 1 in)
- Plays: Right-handed
- Coach: Aleksander Kachmazov
- Prize money: US $464,765

Singles
- Career record: 4–7
- Career titles: 0
- Highest ranking: No. 161 (5 May 2025)
- Current ranking: No. 361 (19 October 2026)

Grand Slam singles results
- Australian Open: Q2 (2025)
- French Open: Q1 (2025)
- Wimbledon: Q1 (2025)
- US Open: Q1 (2025)

Doubles
- Career record: 0–1
- Career titles: 0
- Highest ranking: No. 250 (8 May 2023)
- Current ranking: No. 1,569 (19 October 2026)
- Last updated on: 19 October 2026.

Alibek Muratovich Kachmazov (Russian: Алибек Муратович Качмазов, IPA: [ɐlʲɪˈbʲek kɐtɕˈmazəf]; born 17 August 2002) is a Russian professional tennis player. He has a career-high ATP singles ranking of No. 161 achieved on 5 May 2025 and a best doubles ranking of No. 250 achieved on 8 May 2023.

Kachmazov plays mostly on ATP Challenger Tour, where he has won one doubles title at 2022 Nonthaburi Challenger, with Evgeny Donskoy.

== Career ==
=== 2019-2023: ATP debut and first win ===
Kachmazov made his ATP main draw debut at the 2019 Kremlin Cup after receiving a wildcard for the singles main draw.

He entered the main draw at the 2023 Chengdu Open as a qualifier but lost in the first round to Christopher O'Connell.

Kachmazov entered the qualifying draw at the 2023 Astana Open as an alternate and won in the first round against third seed Fabian Marozsan and seventh seed Damir Dzumhur to qualify for his third main draw. He won his first ATP Tour level match against Corentin Moutet.

=== 2024: First ATP semifinal, top 200 debut ===
Ranked No. 252, he again entered the main draw at the 2024 Chengdu Open as a qualifier and recorded his second and third ATP wins over two top 100 players Aleksandar Kovacevic, Taro Daniel, and top-30 player Nicolás Jarry to reach his first ATP semifinal, becoming the lowest-ranked semifinalist in tournament history. As a result he reached a new career-high ranking in the top 180 on 23 September 2024, raising more than 70 positions up.

== ATP Challenger Tour finals ==
=== Singles: 2 (1 title, 1 runner-up) ===
Legend ATP Challenger Tour (1–1)

Result	W–L	Date	Tournament	Tier	Surface	Opponent	Score
Loss	0–1	Apr 2025	Gwangju Open, South Korea	Challenger	Hard	(Australia) Jason Kubler	5–7, 7–6^{(9–7)}, 3–6
Win	1–1	Oct 2026	Wuning Challenger, China	Challenger	Hard	(Japan) Jay Friend	4–6, 7–6^{(9–7)}, 7–6^{(8–6)}

=== Doubles: 1 (title) ===
Legend ATP Challenger Tour (1–0)

Result	W–L	Date	Tournament	Tier	Surface	Partner	Opponents	Score
Win	1–0	Aug 2022	Nonthaburi Challenger, Thailand	Challenger	Hard	Evgeny Donskoy	(South Korea) Nam Ji-sung (South Korea) Song Min-kyu	6–3, 1–6, [10–7]

== ITF World Tennis Tour finals ==
=== Singles: 16 (11 titles, 5 runner-ups) ===
Legend ITF WTT (11–5)	Finals by surface Hard (10–4) Clay (1–1)

Result	W–L	Date	Tournament	Tier	Surface	Opponent	Score
Loss	0–1	Dec 2019	M15 Heraklion, Greece	WTT	Hard	(Russia) Boris Pokotilov	7–6^{(7–4)}, 2–6, 6–7^{(6–8)}
Win	1–1	Feb 2021	M15 Saint Petersburg, Russia	WTT	Hard (i)	(Russia) Alexey Zakharov	6–4, 5–7, 6–4
Loss	1–2	Oct 2021	M15 Kazan, Russia	WTT	Hard (i)	(Russia) Bogdan Bobrov	5–7, 4–6
Win	2–2	Oct 2021	M25 Nur-Sultan, Kazakhstan	WTT	Hard (i)	(Russia) Bogdan Bobrov	6–2, 4–6, 6–4
Win	3–2	Nov 2021	M15 Kazan, Russia	WTT	Hard (i)	(Belarus) Martin Borisiouk	6–2, 6–2
Win	4–2	Jan 2022	M15 Kazan, Russia	WTT	Hard (i)	(Russia) Marat Sharipov	6–3, 6–3
Win	5–2	Mar 2022	M25 Nur-Sultan, Kazakhstan	WTT	Hard (i)	(Kazakhstan) Beibit Zhukayev	6–3, 6–7^{(5–7)}, 7–6^{(7–4)}
Win	6–2	Apr 2022	M15 Sharm El Sheikh, Egypt	WTT	Hard	(Italy) Samuel Vincent Ruggeri	6–2, 6–4
Loss	6–3	May 2022	M15 Shymkent, Kazakhstan	WTT	Clay	(France) Sean Cuenin	3–6, 6–7^{(3–7)}
Loss	6–4	Apr 2023	M25 Sharm El Sheikh, Egypt	WTT	Hard	(Georgia (country)) Saba Purtseladze	4–6, 5–7
Win	7–4	Apr 2023	M25 Tbilisi, Georgia	WTT	Hard	Egor Agafonov	6–2, 6–1
Win	8–4	Jun 2023	M25 La Nucia, Spain	WTT	Clay	(Spain) Carlos Sánchez Jover	6–3, 6–1
Loss	8–5	Mar 2024	M25 Saint-Dizier, France	WTT	Hard (i)	(Belgium) Gauthier Onclin	6–3, 6–7^{(3–7)}, 5–7
Win	9–5	Apr 2026	M25 Sharm El Sheikh, Egypt	WTT	Hard	Anton Arzhankin	6–3, 6–4
Win	10–5	Sep 2026	M25 Guiyang, China	WTT	Hard	(South Korea) Chung Yun-seong	6–3, 6–4
Win	11–5	Sep 2026	M25 Yinchuan, China	WTT	Hard	(Chinese Taipei) Chen Kuan-shou	6–3, 6–4

=== Doubles: 6 (4 titles, 2 runner-up) ===
Legend ITF WTT (4–2)	Finals by surface Hard (3–2) Clay (1–0)

Result	W–L	Date	Tournament	Tier	Surface	Partner	Opponents	Score
Win	1–0	Oct 2020	M15 Monastir, Tunisia	WTT	Hard	(Estonia) Vladimir Ivanov	(Lithuania) Laurynas Grigelis (Lithuania) Lukas Mugevičius	6–4, 6–4
Win	2–0	Feb 2022	M25 Sharm El Sheikh, Egypt	WTT	Hard	(Kazakhstan) Beibit Zhukayev	(Chinese Taipei) Hsu Yu-hsiou (Austria) Neil Oberleitner	1–6, 7–6^{(7–1)}, [10–5]
Win	3–0	Apr 2022	M15 Shymkent, Kazakhstan	WTT	Clay	Marat Sharipov	Yan Bondarevskiy (Georgia (country)) Aleksandre Bakshi	6–3, 6–4
Win	4–0	Apr 2023	M25 Sharm El Sheikh, Egypt	WTT	Hard	(Uzbekistan) Sergey Fomin	(Moldova) Alexandr Cozbinov (Denmark) August Holmgren	6–2, 6–3
Loss	4–1	Apr 2023	M25 Tbilisi, Georgia	WTT	Hard	Egor Agafonov	Aliaksandr Liaonenka; Alexander Zgirovsky	0–6, 6–3, [5–10]
Loss	4–2	Sep 2026	M25 Yinchuan, China	WTT	Hard	(Czech Republic) Dominik Palán	(Germany) Nikolai Barsukov (Germany) Nino Ehrenschneider	7–6^{(17–15)}, 4–6, [8–10]
