= Song Min-kyu (tennis) =

South Korean tennis player

Song Min-kyu 송민규
- Country (sports): South Korea
- Residence: Seoul, South Korea
- Born: 25 August 1990 (age 36) Yongin, South Korea
- Height: 1.83 m (6 ft 0 in)
- Plays: Right-handed (two-handed backhand)
- Prize money: $128,688

Singles
- Career record: 0-0 (at ATP Tour level, Grand Slam level, and in Davis Cup)
- Career titles: 0
- Highest ranking: No. 587 (20 May 2019)

Doubles
- Career record: 3–8 (at ATP Tour level, Grand Slam level, and in Davis Cup)
- Career titles: 0
- Highest ranking: No. 113 (2 March 2020)

Grand Slam doubles results
- Australian Open: 2R (2020, 2021)

Team competitions
- Davis Cup: 0–3

- Song Min-kyu
- Hangul: 송민규
- RR: Song Mingyu
- MR: Song Min'gyu

Song Min-kyu (born 25 August 1990) is a South Korean tennis player.

Song has a career high ATP singles ranking of No. 587 achieved on 20 May 2019 and a career high ATP doubles ranking of No. 113 achieved on 2 March 2020. Song has won three Challenger doubles titles.

Song has represented South Korea at the Davis Cup, where he has a win–loss record of 1–5 as of 12 September 2022.

== Performance timeline ==
Key
W	F	SF	QF	#R	RR	Q#	DNQ	A	NH

(W) winner; (F) finalist; (SF) semifinalist; (QF) quarterfinalist; (#R) rounds 4, 3, 2, 1; (RR) round-robin stage; (Q#) qualification round; (DNQ) did not qualify; (A) absent; (NH) not held; (SR) strike rate (events won / competed); (W–L) win–loss record.

=== Doubles ===
Tournament	2020	2021	W–L	Win %
Grand Slam tournaments
Australian Open	2R	2R	2–2	50%
French Open			0–0	–
Wimbledon			0–0	–
US Open			0–0	–
Win–loss	1–1	1–1	2–2	50%

== Challenger and Futures finals ==
=== Singles: 5 (3–2) ===
Legend (singles) ATP Challenger Tour (0–0) ITF Futures Tour (3–2)	Titles by surface Hard (1–2) Clay (2–0) Grass (0–0) Carpet (0–0)

Result	W–L	Date	Tournament	Tier	Surface	Opponent	Score
Loss	0–1	Jul 2014	Hong Kong F3, Hong Kong	Futures	Hard	(Japan) Kento Takeuchi	2–6, 1–4 ret.
Win	1–1	Sep 2015	Korea F7, Ansung	Futures	Clay (i)	(South Korea) Kim Cheong-eui	6–3, 7–6^{(7–3)}
Win	2–1	Jul 2016	Korea F3, Gimcheon	Futures	Hard	(South Korea) Son Ji-hoon	6–3, 6–2
Win	3–1	Sep 2018	Korea F6, Anseong	Futures	Clay (i)	(South Korea) Shin San-hui	4–6, 7–6^{(8–6)}, 6–2
Loss	3–2	Nov 2018	Thailand F7, Nonthaburi	Futures	Hard	(Russia) Konstantin Kravchuk	3–6, 3–6

=== Doubles: 45 (30–15) ===
Legend (doubles) ATP Challenger Tour (7–7) ITF Futures Tour (23–8)	Titles by surface Hard (26–15) Clay (4–0) Grass (0–0) Carpet (0–0)

Result	W–L	Date	Tournament	Tier	Surface	Partner	Opponents	Score
Loss	0–1	May 2015	Busan, Korea, Rep.	Challenger	Hard	(South Korea) Nam Ji-sung	(Thailand) Sanchai Ratiwatana (Thailand) Sonchat Ratiwatana	6–7^{(2–7)}, 6–3, [7–10]
Loss	0–2	May 2015	Korea F1, Daegu	Futures	Hard	(South Korea) Nam Ji-sung	(South Korea) Hong Seong-chan (South Korea) Lee Hyung-taik	3–6, 3–6
Win	1–2	May 2015	Korea F2, Changwon	Futures	Hard	(South Korea) Nam Ji-sung	(South Korea) Choi Jae-won (South Korea) Kim Hyun-joon	6–2, 5–7, [10–6]
Win	2–2	Jun 2016	Korea F2, Sangju	Futures	Hard	(South Korea) Nam Ji-sung	(South Korea) Chung Yun-seong (South Korea) Lim Yong-kyu	6–4, 6–4
Win	3–2	Jul 2016	Korea F4, Gimcheon	Futures	Hard	(South Korea) Nam Ji-sung	(Japan) Shintaro Imai (Japan) Takuto Niki	6–4, 6–4
Loss	3–3	Jul 2016	Korea F5, Gimcheon	Futures	Hard	(South Korea) Nam Ji-sung	(South Korea) Kim Cheong-eui (South Korea) Noh Sang-woo	6–7^{(5–7)}, 7–6^{(7–4)}, [4–10]
Win	4–3	Sep 2016	Korea F8, Ansung	Futures	Clay (i)	(South Korea) Nam Ji-sung	(Japan) Katsuki Nagao (Japan) Hiromasa Oku	6–4, 6–4
Loss	4–4	Jun 2017	Korea F3, Gimcheon	Futures	Hard	(South Korea) Seol Jae-min	(South Korea) Jeong Young-hoon (South Korea) Kim Hyun-joon	7–5, 6–7^{(5–7)}, [4–10]
Loss	4–5	Jun 2017	Korea F4, Daegu	Futures	Hard	(South Korea) Seol Jae-min	(South Korea) Lim Yong-kyu (South Korea) Noh Sang-woo	3–6, 2–6
Win	5–5	Dec 2017	Thailand F11, Hua Hin	Futures	Hard	(South Korea) Chung Hong	(United States) Nicholas S. Hu (Thailand) Wishaya Trongcharoenchaikul	6–4, 6–3
Win	6–5	Dec 2017	Thailand F12, Hua Hin	Futures	Hard	(South Korea) Chung Hong	(China) Gao Xin (China) Sun Fajing	7–6^{(7–5)}, 3–6, [10–6]
Loss	6–6	Mar 2018	Japan F3, Kōfu	Futures	Hard	(South Korea) Seol Jae-min	(Japan) Hiroyasu Ehara (Japan) Sho Katayama	5–7, 6–7^{(5–7)}
Win	7–6	Apr 2018	Kazakhstan F3, Shymkent	Futures	Clay	(South Korea) Seol Jae-min	(Kazakhstan) Timur Khabibulin (Belarus) Dzmitry Zhyrmont	7–5, 6–3
Win	8–6	May 2018	Vietnam F3, Thừa Thiên-Huế	Futures	Hard	(South Korea) Nam Ji-sung	(Thailand) Kittirat Kerdlaphee (Thailand) Palaphoom Kovapitukted	6–1, 6–4
Win	9–6	Jul 2018	China F9, Shenzhen	Futures	Hard	(South Korea) Nam Ji-sung	(China) Gao Xin (China) Wang Aoran	3–6, 6–4, [10–4]
Win	10–6	Jul 2018	China F10, Shenzhen	Futures	Hard	(South Korea) Nam Ji-sung	(Chinese Taipei) Chen Ti (New Zealand) Rubin Statham	7–6^{(7–3)}, 6–2
Win	11–6	Aug 2018	Gwangju, Korea, Rep.	Challenger	Hard	(South Korea) Nam Ji-sung	(Zimbabwe) Benjamin Lock (New Zealand) Rubin Statham	5–7, 6–3, [10–5]
Win	12–6	Sep 2018	Korea F6, Anseong	Futures	Clay (i)	(South Korea) Lee Jea-moon	(South Korea) Chung Hong (South Korea) Noh Sang-woo	6–2, 6–1
Win	13–6	Nov 2018	Thailand F9, Nonthaburi	Futures	Hard	(Thailand) Pruchya Isaro	(Chinese Taipei) Chen Ti (Japan) Sora Fukuda	6–3, 4–6, [13–11]
Win	14–6	Mar 2019	M15 Nishitokyo, Japan	World Tennis Tour	Hard	(South Korea) Nam Ji-sung	(Japan) Shintaro Imai (Japan) Takuto Niki	4–6, 7–6^{(7–4)}, [10–7]
Loss	14–7	May 2019	Gwangju, Korea, Rep.	Challenger	Hard	(South Korea) Nam Ji-sung	(Chinese Taipei) Hsieh Cheng-peng (Indonesia) Christopher Rungkat	3–6, 6–3, [6–10]
Win	15–7	May 2019	M25 Nonthaburi, Thailand	World Tennis Tour	Hard	(South Korea) Nam Ji-sung	(Thailand) Sanchai Ratiwatana (Thailand) Sonchat Ratiwatana	7–6^{(10–8)}, 6–1
Win	16–7	Jun 2019	M15 Daegu, South Korea	World Tennis Tour	Hard	(South Korea) Lim Yong-Kyu	(Japan) Takuto Niki (Japan) Issei Okamura	6–3, 7–5
Win	17–7	Jul 2019	M25 Taipei, Chinese Taipei	World Tennis Tour	Hard	(Japan) Sora Fukuda	(Japan) Makoto Ochi (Japan) Renta Tokuda	6–4, 2–6, [10–3]
Loss	17–8	Aug 2019	Chengdu, China, P.R.	Challenger	Hard	(South Korea) Nam Ji-sung	(India) Arjun Kadhe (India) Saketh Myneni	3–6, 6–0, [6–10]
Win	18–8	Aug 2019	Yokkaichi, Japan	Challenger	Hard	(South Korea) Nam Ji-sung	(China) Gong Maoxin (China) Zhang Ze	6–3, 3–6, [14–12]
Win	19–8	Aug 2019	Baotou, China, P.R.	Challenger	Clay (i)	(South Korea) Nam Ji-sung	(Russia) Teymuraz Gabashvili (India) Sasikumar Mukund	7–6^{(7–3)}, 6–2
Loss	19–9	Sep 2019	Jinan, China, P.R.	Challenger	Hard	(South Korea) Nam Ji-sung	(Australia) Matthew Ebden (India) Divij Sharan	6–7^{(4–7)}, 7–5, [3–10]
Loss	19–10	Oct 2019	Liuzhou, China, P.R.	Challenger	Hard	(South Korea) Nam Ji-sung	(Uzbekistan) Denis Istomin (Russia) Mikhail Elgin	6–3, 4–6, [6–10]
Loss	19–11	Nov 2019	M15 Nonthaburi, Thailand	World Tennis Tour	Hard	(South Korea) Lee Jea-moon	(South Korea) Chung Hong (South Korea) Nam Ji-sung	6–1, 3–6, [7–10]
Win	20–11	Mar 2022	M25 Bakersfield, United States	World Tennis Tour	Hard	(South Korea) Nam Ji-sung	(Israel) Daniel Cukierman (South Africa) Ruan Roelofse	6–2, 6–0
Win	21–11	Mar 2022	M25 Calabasas, United States	World Tennis Tour	Hard	(South Korea) Nam Ji-sung	(United Kingdom) Charles Broom (United Kingdom) Henry Patten	6–3, 7–6^{(7–4)}
Loss	21–12	Apr 2022	M15 Chiang Rai, Thailand	World Tennis Tour	Hard	(South Korea) Nam Ji-sung	(South Korea) Hong Seong-chan (South Korea) Kim Cheung-Eui	6–4, 6–7^{(2–7)}, [8–10]
Win	22–12	Apr 2022	M15 Chiang Rai, Thailand	World Tennis Tour	Hard	(South Korea) Nam Ji-sung	(Japan) Shinji Hazawa (Japan) Kim Cheung-Eui	6–2, 6–4
Win	23–12	Apr 2022	M15 Chiang Rai, Thailand	World Tennis Tour	Hard	(South Korea) Nam Ji-sung	(China) Bai Yan (South Korea) Takuto Niki	6–1, 6–4
Loss	23–13	Jun 2022	M25 Harmon, Guam	World Tennis Tour	Hard	(South Korea) Nam Ji-sung	(Japan) Toshihide Matsui (Japan) Kaito Uesugi	3–6, 6–0, [7–10]
Win	24–13	Jul 2022	Nur-Sultan, Kazakhstan	Challenger	Hard	(South Korea) Nam Ji-sung	(Czech Republic) Andrew Paulson (Czech Republic) David Poljak	6–2, 3–6, [10–6]
Win	25–13	Jul 2022	M25 Tbilisi, Georgia	World Tennis Tour	Hard	(South Korea) Hong Seong-chan	Aliaksandr Liaonenka; Alexander Zgirovsky	6–7^{(3–7)}, 7–6^{(7–3)}, [10–6]
Win	26–13	Aug 2022	M25 Tbilisi, Georgia	World Tennis Tour	Hard	(South Korea) Hong Seong-chan	Ivan Liutarevich (Czech Republic) David Poljak	7–5, 6–2
Loss	26–14	Aug 2022	Nonthaburi, Thailand	Challenger	Hard	(South Korea) Nam Ji-sung	Evgeny Donskoy; Alibek Kachmazov	3–6, 6–1, [7–10]
Loss	26–15	Oct 2022	Busan, South Korea	Challenger	Hard	(South Korea) Nam Ji-sung	(Australia) Marc Polmans (Australia) Max Purcell	7–6^{(7–5)}, 2–6, [10–12]
Win	27–15	Jan 2023	Nonathaburi, Thailand	Challenger	Hard	(South Korea) Nam Ji-sung	(United Kingdom) Jan Choinski (United Kingdom) Stuart Parker	6–4, 6–4
Win	28–15	Jul 2023	Pozoblanco, Spain	Challenger	Hard	(South Korea) Nam Ji-sung	(United Kingdom) Luke Johnson (Zimbabwe) Benjamin Lock	2–6, 6–4, [10–8]
Win	29–15	Mar 2024	M15 Hinode, Japan	World Tennis Tour	Hard	(South Korea) Lee Jea-moon	(Japan) Masamichi Imamura (Japan) Kaito Uesugi	6–4, 7–5
Win	30–15	Apr 2024	Gwangju, Korea, Rep.	Challenger	Hard	(South Korea) Lee Jea-moon	(China) Cui Jie (South Korea) Lee Duck-hee	1–6, 6–1, [10–3]
