= Lee Jea-moon =

South Korean tennis player

Lee Jea-moon 이재문
- Country (sports): South Korea
- Born: 2 July 1993 (age 32)
- Plays: Right-handed (two-handed backhand)
- Prize money: $68,791

Singles
- Career record: 0–1 (at ATP Tour level, Grand Slam level, and in Davis Cup)
- Career titles: 2 ITF
- Highest ranking: No. 466 (7 August 2023)
- Current ranking: No. 963 (23 February 2026)

Doubles
- Career record: 0–3 (at ATP Tour level, Grand Slam level, and in Davis Cup)
- Career titles: 1 Challenger, 8 ITF
- Highest ranking: No. 300 (22 April 2023)
- Current ranking: No. 831 (23 February 2026)
- Last updated on: 23 February 2026.

- Lee Jea-moon
- Hangul: 이재문
- RR: I Jaemun
- MR: I Chaemun

Lee Jea-moon (Korean: 이재문; born 2 July 1993) is a South Korean tennis player.

Lee has a career high ATP singles ranking of 466 achieved on 7 August 2023. He also has a career high ATP doubles ranking of 300 achieved on 22 April 2023.

Lee represents South Korea at the Davis Cup. He has won one ATP Challenger doubles title.

== Challenger and Futures/World Tennis Tour Finals ==
=== Singles: 7 (2–5) ===
Legend ATP Challenger Tour (0–0) ITF Futures/World Tennis Tour (2–5)	Finals by surface Hard (2–5) Clay (0–0) Grass (0–0) Carpet (0–0)

Result	W–L	Date	Tournament	Tier	Surface	Opponent	Score
Loss	0–1	Jun 2017	Korea F2, Gimcheon	Futures	Hard	(United States) Daniel Nguyen	3–6, 4–6
Loss	0–2	Jun 2018	Korea F1, Sangju	Futures	Hard	(South Korea) Lim Yong-kyu	4–6, 6–7^{(5–7)}
Win	1–2	Aug 2022	M15 Changwon, South Korea	World Tour	Hard	(New Zealand) Ajeet Rai	6–4, 6–4
Loss	1–3	Apr 2023	M25 Kashiwa, Japan	World Tour	Hard	(Japan) Hsu Yu-hsiou	1–6, 1–6
Loss	1–4	Apr 2023	M25 Jakarta, Indonesia	World Tour	Hard	(Sweden) Leo Borg	4–6, 4–6
Loss	1–5	Jun 2023	M25 Daegu, South Korea	World Tour	Hard	(South Korea) Uisung Park	3–6, 5–7
Win	2–5	Jul 2023	M15 Nakhon Si Thammarat, Thailand	World Tour	Hard	(Japan) Taisei Ichikawa	6–4, 6–1

=== Doubles: 17 (8–9) ===
Legend ATP Challenger Tour (1–0) ITF Futures/World Tennis Tour (7–9)	Finals by surface Hard (6–9) Clay (2–0) Grass (0–0) Carpet (0–0)

Result	W–L	Date	Tournament	Tier	Surface	Partner	Opponents	Score
Loss	0–1	Aug 2014	Korea F10	Futures	Hard	(South Korea) Kim Jae Hwan	(Japan) Kaichi Uchida (Japan) Yusuke Watanuki	3–6, 2–6
Loss	0–2	Dec 2014	Cambodia F3	Futures	Hard	(South Korea) Chung Hong	(Chinese Taipei) Huang Liang-Chi (China) Ouyang Bowen	4–6, 3–6
Win	1–2	Aug 2015	Korea F4, Gimcheon	Futures	Hard	(South Korea) Daniel Yoo	(South Korea) Kim Cheong-Eui (South Korea) Noh Sang-Woo	6–7^{(4–7)}, 7–6^{(7–5)}, [10–8]
Loss	1–3	Dec 2016	Thailand F4, Hua Hin	Futures	Hard	(South Korea) Lim Yong-Kyu	(Thailand) Pruchya Isaro (Thailand) Chayanon Kaewsuto	(W/O)
Loss	1–4	Dec 2016	Thailand F5, Hua Hin	Futures	Hard	(South Korea) Kwon Soon-woo	(France) Sadio Doumbia (France) Fabien Reboul	3–6, 4–6
Win	2–4	Jun 2017	Korea F1, Sangui	Futures	Hard	(South Korea) Chung Hong	(Chinese Taipei) Hung Jui-Chen (United States) Daniel Nguyen	6–0, 6–0
Win	3–4	Sep 2018	Korea F6, Anseong	Futures	Clay	(South Korea) Song Min-kyu	(South Korea) Chung Hong (South Korea) Noh Sang-Woo	6–2, 6–1
Loss	3–5	Oct 2019	M15 Changwon, South Korea	World Tennis Tour	Hard	(South Korea) Chung Hong	(Japan) Shintaro Mochizuki (Japan) Naoki Nakagawa	4–6, 4–6
Loss	3–6	Nov 2019	M15 Nonthaburi, Thailand	World Tennis Tour	Hard	(South Korea) Song Min-kyu	(South Korea) Chung Hong (South Korea) Nam Ji-Sung	6–1, 3–6, [7–10]
Win	4–6	Dec 2019	M15 Nonthaburi, Thailand	World Tennis Tour	Hard	(South Korea) Chung Hong	(India) S D Prajwal Dev (India) Adil Kalyanpur	6–3, 5–7, [10–6]
Win	5–6	Aug 2022	M15 Anseong, South Korea	World Tennis Tour	Clay	(South Korea) Kim Cheong-Eui	(Australia) Timothy Gray (Australia) Thomas Pavlekovich Smith	6–3, 6–1
Loss	5–7	Aug 2022	M15 Changwon, South Korea	World Tennis Tour	Hard	(South Korea) Jeong Yeong-Seok	(Australia) Thomas Fancutt (New Zealand) Ajeet Rai	7–5, 4–6, [8–10]
Win	6–7	Sep 2022	M15 Daegu, South Korea	World Tennis Tour	Hard	(South Korea) Kim Cheong-Eui	(India) Adil Kalyanpur (Thailand) Palaphoom Kovapitukted	6–7^{(7–9)}, 6–4, [10–8]
Loss	6–8	Jul 2023	M15 Nakhon Si Thammarat, Thailand	World Tennis Tour	Hard	(South Korea) Jeong Yeong-Seok	(South Korea) Han Seon Yong (Thailand) Thantub Suksumrarn	4–6, 4–6
Loss	6–9	Aug 2023	M25 Jakarta, Indonesia	World Tennis Tour	Hard	(South Korea) Han Seon Yong	(Indonesia) Nathan Anthony Barki (Indonesia) Christopher Rungkat	6–2, 4–6, [10–1]
Win	7–9	Mar 2024	M15 Hinode, Japan	World Tennis Tour	Hard	(South Korea) Song Min-kyu	(Japan) Masamichi Imamura (Japan) Kaito Uesugi	6–4, 7–5
Win	8–9	Apr 2024	Gwangju, Korea, Rep.	Challenger	Hard	(South Korea) Song Min-kyu	(China) Cui Jie (South Korea) Lee Duck-hee	1–6, 6–1, [10–3]
