= Nam Ji-sung =

South Korean tennis player (born 1993)

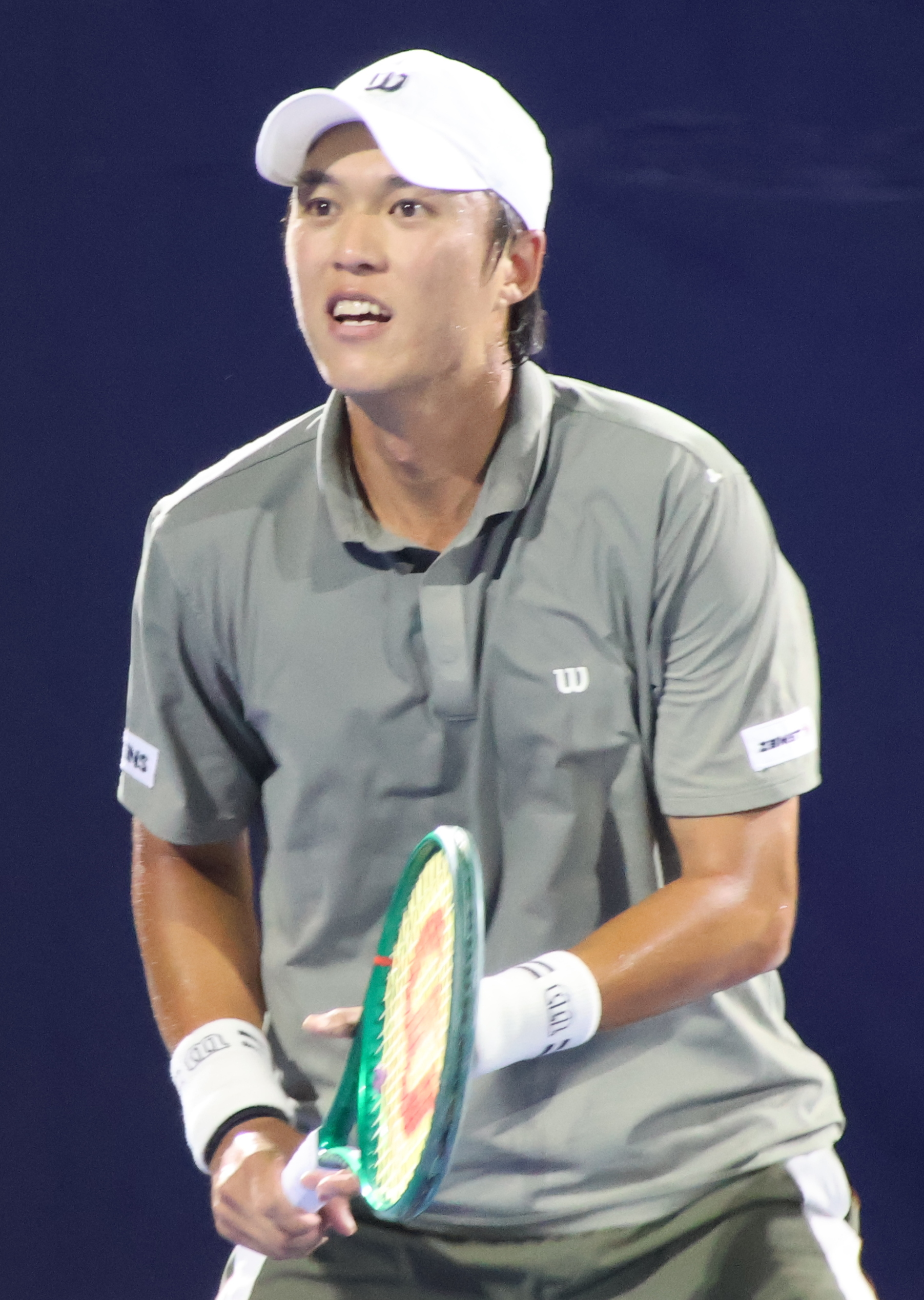
- Nam in 2026
- Full name: Nam Ji-sung
- Country (sports): South Korea
- Residence: Seoul, South Korea
- Born: 15 August 1993 (age 33) Busan, South Korea
- Plays: Right-handed (two handed-backhand)
- Prize money: $293,832

Singles
- Career record: 3–6
- Career titles: 0
- Highest ranking: No. 236 (12 August 2019)
- Current ranking: No. 708 (15 April 2024)

Grand Slam singles results
- Australian Open: Q1 (2020)

Doubles
- Career record: 11–18
- Career titles: 0
- Highest ranking: No. 102 (3 February 2020)
- Current ranking: No. 143 (15 March 2026)

Grand Slam doubles results
- Australian Open: 2R (2020, 2021)

Team competitions
- Davis Cup: 3–7
Medal record
Men's tennis
Representing South Korea
Asian Games
Silver medal – second place	2026 Aichi–Nagoya	Doubles
- Last updated on: 15 April 2024.

- Nam Ji-sung
- Hangul: 남지성
- RR: Nam Jiseong
- MR: Nam Chisŏng

Nam Ji-sung (born 15 August 1993) is a South Korean tennis player. He has a career high ATP singles ranking of world No. 236 achieved on 12 August 2019. He also has a career high ATP doubles ranking of No. 102 achieved on 3 February 2020. In 2024, he became the first Korean in 13 years to win the Busan Open in doubles.

Playing for South Korea in Davis Cup, Nam has a W/L record of 3–7.

== Performance timeline ==
Key
W	F	SF	QF	#R	RR	Q#	DNQ	A	NH

(W) winner; (F) finalist; (SF) semifinalist; (QF) quarterfinalist; (#R) rounds 4, 3, 2, 1; (RR) round-robin stage; (Q#) qualification round; (DNQ) did not qualify; (A) absent; (NH) not held; (SR) strike rate (events won / competed); (W–L) win–loss record.

=== Singles ===
Tournament	2020	SR	W–L	Win%
Grand Slam tournaments
Australian Open	Q1	0 / 0	0–0	–
French Open		0 / 0	0–0	–
Wimbledon	NH	0 / 0	0-0	–
US Open		0 / 0	0-0	–
Win–loss	0–0	0 / 0	0-0	–

=== Doubles ===
Tournament	2020	2021	W–L	Win %
Grand Slam tournaments
Australian Open	2R	2R	2–2	50%
French Open	A		0–0	–
Wimbledon	NH		0–0	–
US Open			0–0	–
Win–loss	1–1	1–1	2–2	50%

== Challenger and Futures/World Tennis Tour finals ==
=== Singles: 17 (6–11) ===
Legend (singles) ATP Challenger Tour (0–2) ITF Futures/World Tennis Tour (6–9)	Titles by surface Hard (4–10) Clay (2–1) Grass (0–0) Carpet (0–0)

Result	W–L	Date	Tournament	Tier	Surface	Opponent	Score
Win	1–0	Jun 2012	Japan F5, Karuizawa	Futures	Clay	(United States) Adam El Mihdawy	6–4, 6–4
Loss	1–1	Jul 2012	Indonesia F1, Jakarta	Futures	Hard	(Indonesia) Christopher Rungkat	6–7^{(5–7)}, 1–6
Loss	1–2	Feb 2014	Thailand F1, Nonthaburi	Futures	Hard	(South Korea) Chung Hyeon	2–6, 6–7^{(4–7)}
Loss	1–3	Jun 2016	Korea F2, Sangju	Futures	Hard	(South Korea) Noh Sang-woo	4–6, 1–6
Win	2–3	Aug 2016	Korea F6, Ansung	Futures	Clay (i)	(Japan) Makoto Ochi	5–7, 6–1, 6–1
Loss	2–4	Sep 2016	Korea F8, Ansung	Futures	Clay (i)	(South Korea) Lim Yong-kyu	0–6, 3–6
Loss	2–5	May 2018	Vietnam F2, Thừa Thiên-Huế	Futures	Hard	(Japan) Rio Noguchi	6–7^{(5–7)}, 3–6
Win	3–5	May 2018	Vietnam F3, Thừa Thiên-Huế	Futures	Hard	(Thailand) Pruchya Isaro	6–4, 6–2
Loss	3–6	Jun 2018	Korea F2, Gyeongsan	Futures	Hard	(South Korea) Chung Yun-seong	4–6, 3–6
Loss	3–7	Jun 2018	Korea F3, Daegu	Futures	Hard	(South Korea) Chung Yun-seong	1–6, 3–6
Loss	3–8	Aug 2018	Gwangju, Korea, Rep.	Challenger	Hard	(Australia) Maverick Banes	3–6, 6–4, 4–6
Win	4–8	Aug 2018	Korea F5, Gimcheon	Futures	Hard	(Japan) Makoto Ochi	6–4, 6–1
Loss	4–9	Mar 2019	M15 Nishi-Tama, Japan	World Tennis Tour	Hard	(Japan) Shintaro Imai	2–6, 2–6
Loss	4–10	May 2019	M25 Nonthaburi, Thailand	World Tennis Tour	Hard	(Japan) Shuichi Sekiguchi	1–6, 4–6
Loss	4–11	Jun 2019	Columbus, USA	Challenger	Hard (i)	(Denmark) Mikael Torpegaard	1–6, 5–7
Win	5–11	Apr 2022	M15 Chiang Rai, Thailand	World Tennis Tour	Hard	(China) Bai Yan	6–2, 6-4
Win	6–11	May 2025	M15 Daegu, South Korea	World Tennis Tour	Hard	(South Korea) Park Ui-sung	6–1, 6-2

=== Doubles: 82 (45 titles, 37 runners-up) ===
Legend (doubles) ATP Challenger Tour (15–16) ITF Futures Tour (30–21)	Titles by surface Hard (41–35) Clay (4–2) Grass (0–0) Carpet (0–0)

Result	W–L	Date	Tournament	Tier	Surface	Partner	Opponents	Score
Loss	0–1	Apr 2011	Australia F3, Ipswich	Futures	Clay	(South Korea) Cho Soong-jae	(Australia) James Lemke (Australia) Dane Propoggia	7–6^{(7–4)}, 2–6, [5–10]
Win	1–1	May 2012	China F7, Zhangjiagang	Futures	Hard	(South Korea) Noh Sang-woo	(China) Gong Maoxin (China) Xue Feng	6–2, 6–4
Win	2–1	Jul 2012	Indonesia F2, Jakarta	Futures	Hard	(South Korea) Lim Yong-kyu	(China) Gao Peng (China) Gao Wan	6–2, 6–0
Loss	2–2	Aug 2012	USA F23, Edwardsville	Futures	Hard	(South Korea) Chung Hyeon	(United States) Daniel Nguyen (United States) Ryan Rowe	3–6, 5–7
Loss	2–3	Oct 2012	Seoul, Korea, Rep.	Challenger	Hard	(South Korea) Lim Yong-kyu	(Chinese Taipei) Lee Hsin-han (Chinese Taipei) Peng Hsien-yin	6–7^{(3–7)}, 5–7
Loss	2–4	Mar 2013	USA F7, Calabasas	Futures	Hard	(South Korea) Lim Yong-kyu	(India) Saketh Myneni (India) Sanam Singh	7–6^{(7–3)}, 2–6, [12–14]
Loss	2–5	Mar 2013	USA F8, Costa Mesa	Futures	Hard	(South Korea) Cho Min-hyeok	(United States) Michael McClune (New Zealand) Michael Venus	1–6, 3–6
Loss	2–6	May 2013	Korea F2, Seoul	Futures	Hard	(South Korea) Chung Hyeon	(South Korea) An Jae-sung (South Korea) Lim Yong-kyu	3–6, 2–6
Loss	2–7	May 2013	Korea F3, Daegu	Futures	Hard	(South Korea) Lim Yong-kyu	(Australia) Dane Propoggia (New Zealand) Rubin Statham	1–6, 2–6
Win	3–7	Jun 2013	Korea F4, Changwon	Futures	Hard	(South Korea) Lim Yong-kyu	(Lithuania) Laurynas Grigelis (Spain) Enrique López Pérez	5–7, 6–4, [11–9]
Loss	3–8	Jun 2013	Korea F7, Gimcheon	Futures	Hard	(South Korea) Lim Yong-kyu	(Chinese Taipei) Huang Liang-chi (Spain) Enrique López Pérez	4–6, 2–6
Loss	3–9	Aug 2013	China F7, Tianjin	Futures	Hard	(South Korea) Chung Hyeon	(India) Sriram Balaji (India) Ranjeet Virali-Murugesan	3–6, 2–6
Loss	3–10	Sep 2013	Bangkok, Thailand	Challenger	Hard	(South Korea) Jeong Suk-young	(Chinese Taipei) Chen Ti (Chinese Taipei) Huang Liang-chi	3–6, 2–6
Win	4–10	Feb 2014	Thailand F2, Nonthaburi	Futures	Hard	(South Korea) Chung Hyeon	(United Kingdom) Lewis Burton (United Kingdom) Marcus Willis	6–4, 6–7^{(4–7)}, [10–7]
Loss	4–11	Mar 2014	Thailand F3, Nonthaburi	Futures	Hard	(South Korea) Chung Hyeon	(United Kingdom) Lewis Burton (United Kingdom) Marcus Willis	3–6, 5–7
Loss	4–12	Mar 2014	China F3, Yuxi	Futures	Hard	(South Korea) Lim Yong-kyu	(China) Li Zhe (China) Wu Di	4–6, 4–6
Loss	4–13	May 2014	Korea F2, Seoul	Futures	Hard	(South Korea) Chung Hong	(Australia) Dane Propoggia (South Africa) Ruan Roelofse	0–6, 3–6
Win	5–13	Jun 2014	Korea F3, Changwon	Futures	Hard	(South Korea) Chung Hyeon	(South Korea) Cho Soong-jae (South Korea) Kim Dylan Seong-kwan	6–3, 6–3
Win	6–13	Jul 2014	China F9, Zhangjiagang	Futures	Hard	(South Korea) Cho Min-hyeok	(China) Qiu Zhuoyang (China) Te Rigele	6–3, 6–4
Loss	6–14	May 2015	Busan, Korea, Rep.	Challenger	Hard	(South Korea) Song Min-kyu	(Thailand) Sanchai Ratiwatana (Thailand) Sonchat Ratiwatana	6–7^{(2–7)}, 6–3, [7–10]
Loss	6–15	May 2015	Korea F1, Daegu	Futures	Hard	(South Korea) Song Min-kyu	(South Korea) Hong Seong-chan (South Korea) Lee Hyung-taik	3–6, 3–6
Win	7–15	May 2015	Korea F2, Changwon	Futures	Hard	(South Korea) Song Min-kyu	(South Korea) Choi Jae-won (South Korea) Kim Hyun-joon	6–2, 5–7, [10–6]
Win	8–15	Aug 2015	Korea F5, Gimcheon	Futures	Hard	(South Korea) Noh Sang-woo	(Japan) Gengo Kikuchi (Japan) Shunrou Takeshima	6–3, 7–6^{(7–3)}
Loss	8–16	Sep 2015	Korea F6, Ansung	Futures	Clay (i)	(South Korea) Noh Sang-woo	(South Korea) Kwon Soon-woo (South Korea) Son Ji-hoon	7–6^{(7–4)}, 3–6, [11–13]
Win	9–16	Jun 2016	Korea F2, Sangju	Futures	Hard	(South Korea) Song Min-kyu	(South Korea) Chung Yun-seong (South Korea) Lim Yong-kyu	6–4, 6–4
Win	10–16	Jul 2016	Korea F4, Gimcheon	Futures	Hard	(South Korea) Song Min-kyu	(Japan) Shintaro Imai (Japan) Takuto Niki	6–4, 6–4
Loss	10–17	Jul 2016	Korea F5, Gimcheon	Futures	Hard	(South Korea) Song Min-kyu	(South Korea) Kim Cheong-eui (South Korea) Noh Sang-woo	6–7^{(5–7)}, 7–6^{(7–4)}, [4–10]
Win	11–17	Sep 2016	Korea F8, Ansung	Futures	Clay (i)	(South Korea) Song Min-kyu	(Japan) Katsuki Nagao (Japan) Hiromasa Oku	6–4, 6–4
Win	12–17	May 2018	Vietnam F3, Thừa Thiên-Huế	Futures	Hard	(South Korea) Song Min-kyu	(Thailand) Kittirat Kerdlaphee (Thailand) Palaphoom Kovapitukted	6–1, 6–4
Win	13–17	Jun 2018	Korea F1, Sangju	Futures	Hard	(South Korea) Lim Yong-kyu	(United States) Alec Adamson (France) Clément Larrière	4–6, 6–4, [10–5]
Win	14–17	Jun 2018	Korea F2, Gyeongsan	Futures	Hard	(South Korea) Lim Yong-kyu	(United States) John Paul Fruttero (Japan) Takuto Niki	6–4, 6–1
Win	15–17	Jul 2018	China F9, Shenzhen	Futures	Hard	(South Korea) Song Min-kyu	(China) Gao Xin (China) Wang Aoran	3–6, 6–4, [10–4]
Win	16–17	Jul 2018	China F10, Shenzhen	Futures	Hard	(South Korea) Song Min-kyu	(Chinese Taipei) Chen Ti (New Zealand) Rubin Statham	7–6^{(7–3)}, 6–2
Win	17–17	Aug 2018	Gwangju, Korea, Rep.	Challenger	Hard	(South Korea) Song Min-kyu	(Zimbabwe) Benjamin Lock (New Zealand) Rubin Statham	5–7, 6–3, [10–5]
Loss	17–18	Aug 2018	Korea F5, Gimcheon	Futures	Hard	(South Korea) Son Ji-hoon	(South Korea) Chung Hong (South Korea) Noh Sang-woo	6–7^{(4–7)}, 6–4, [8–10]
Win	18–18	Mar 2019	M15 Nishitokyo, Japan	World Tennis Tour	Hard	(South Korea) Song Min-kyu	(Japan) Shintaro Imai (Japan) Takuto Niki	4–6, 7–6^{(7–4)}, [10–7]
Loss	18–19	Apr 2019	M15 Kashiwa, Japan	World Tennis Tour	Hard	(South Korea) Kim Cheong-Eui	(Japan) Yusuke Takahashi (Japan) Jumpei Yamasaki	1–6, 3–6
Loss	18–20	Apr 2019	M25 Matsuyama, Japan	World Tennis Tour	Hard	(South Korea) Kim Cheong-Eui	(Japan) Shinji Hazawa (Japan) Naoki Tajima	6–4, 1–6, [7–10]
Loss	18–21	May 2019	Gwangju, Korea, Rep.	Challenger	Hard	(South Korea) Song Min-kyu	(Chinese Taipei) Hsieh Cheng-peng (Indonesia) Christopher Rungkat	3–6, 6–3, [6–10]
Win	19–21	May 2019	M25 Nonthaburi, Thailand	World Tennis Tour	Hard	(South Korea) Song Min-kyu	(Thailand) Sanchai Ratiwatana (Thailand) Sonchat Ratiwatana	7–6^{(10–8)}, 6–1
Loss	19–22	Jul 2019	Nur-Sultan, Kazakhstan	Challenger	Hard	(South Korea) Chung Yun-seong	(Kazakhstan) Andrey Golubev (Kazakhstan) Aleksandr Nedovyesov	4–6, 4–6
Loss	19–23	Aug 2019	Chengdu, China, P.R.	Challenger	Hard	(South Korea) Song Min-kyu	(India) Arjun Kadhe (India) Saketh Myneni	3–6, 6–0, [6–10]
Win	20–23	Aug 2019	Yokkaichi, Japan	Challenger	Hard	(South Korea) Song Min-kyu	(China) Gong Maoxin (China) Zhang Ze	6–3, 3–6, [14–12]
Win	21–23	Aug 2019	Baotou, China, P.R.	Challenger	Clay (i)	(South Korea) Song Min-kyu	(Russia) Teymuraz Gabashvili (India) Sasikumar Mukund	7–6^{(7–3)}, 6–2
Loss	21–24	Sep 2019	Jinan, China, P.R.	Challenger	Hard	(South Korea) Song Min-kyu	(Australia) Matthew Ebden (India) Divij Sharan	6–7^{(4–7)}, 7–5, [3–10]
Loss	21–25	Oct 2019	Liuzhou, China, P.R.	Challenger	Hard	(South Korea) Song Min-kyu	(Uzbekistan) Denis Istomin (Russia) Mikhail Elgin	6–3, 4–6, [6–10]
Win	22–25	Nov 2019	M15 Nonthaburi, Thailand	World Tennis Tour	Hard	(South Korea) Chung Hong	(South Korea) Lee Jea-moon (South Korea) Song Min-kyu	1–6, 6–3, [10–7]
Win	23–25	Jun 2021	M15 Monastir, Tunisia	World Tennis Tour	Hard	(South Korea) Hong Seong-chan	(Argentina) Matías Franco Descotte (Canada) Filip Peliwo	6–3, 6–1
Win	24–25	Jun 2021	M15 Monastir, Tunisia	World Tennis Tour	Hard	(South Korea) Hong Seong-chan	(Russia) Timur Kiyamov (Canada) Kelsey Stevenson	6–2, 6–4
Win	25–25	Jan 2022	M15 Antalya, Turkey	World Tennis Tour	Clay	(South Korea) Hong Seong-chan	(Sweden) Dragoș Nicolae Mădăraș (Ukraine) Oleksandr Ovcharenko	6–3, 6–3
Win	26–25	Jan 2022	M15 Antalya, Turkey	World Tennis Tour	Clay	(South Korea) Hong Seong-chan	(Turkey) Sarp Ağabigün (Romania) Alexandru Jecan	6–4, 6–4
Win	27–25	Mar 2022	M25 Bakersfield, United States	World Tennis Tour	Hard	(South Korea) Song Min-kyu	(Israel) Daniel Cukierman (South Africa) Ruan Roelofse	6–2, 6–0
Win	28–25	Mar 2022	M25 Calabasas, United States	World Tennis Tour	Hard	(South Korea) Song Min-kyu	(United Kingdom) Charles Broom (United Kingdom) Henry Patten	6–3, 7–6^{(7–4)}
Loss	28–26	Apr 2022	M15 Chiang Rai, Thailand	World Tennis Tour	Hard	(South Korea) Song Min-kyu	(South Korea) Hong Seong-chan (South Korea) Kim Cheong-Eui	6–4, 6–7^{(2–7)}, [8–10]
Win	29–26	Apr 2022	M15 Chiang Rai, Thailand	World Tennis Tour	Hard	(South Korea) Song Min-kyu	(Japan) Shinji Hazawa (Japan) Takuto Niki	6–1, 6–4
Win	30–26	Apr 2022	M15 Chiang Rai, Thailand	World Tennis Tour	Hard	(South Korea) Song Min-kyu	(China) Bai Yan (South Korea) Kim Cheong-Eui	6–2, 6–4
Loss	30–27	Jun 2022	M25 Harmon, Guam	World Tennis Tour	Hard	(South Korea) Song Min-kyu	(Japan) Toshihide Matsui (Japan) Kaito Uesugi	3–6, 6–0, [7–10]
Win	31–27	Jul 2022	Nur-Sultan, Kazakhstan	Challenger	Hard	(South Korea) Song Min-kyu	(Czech Republic) Andrew Paulson (Czech Republic) David Poljak	6–2, 3–6, [10–6]
Loss	31–28	Aug 2022	Nonthaburi, Thailand	Challenger	Hard	(South Korea) Song Min-kyu	Evgeny Donskoy; Alibek Kachmazov	3–6, 6–1, [7–10]
Loss	31–29	Oct 2022	Busan, South Korea	Challenger	Hard	(South Korea) Song Min-kyu	(Australia) Marc Polmans (Australia) Max Purcell	7–6^{(7–5)}, 2–6, [10–12]
Win	32–29	Jan 2023	Nonthaburi, Thailand	Challenger	Hard	(South Korea) Song Min-kyu	(United Kingdom) Jan Choinski (United Kingdom) Stuart Parker	6–4, 6–4
Win	33–29	Jun 2023	Little Rock, USA	Challenger	Hard	(New Zealand) Artem Sitak	(Canada) Alexis Galarneau (United States) Nicolas Moreno de Alboran	6–4, 6–4
Win	34–29	Jul 2023	Pozoblanco, Spain	Challenger	Hard	(South Korea) Song Min-kyu	(United Kingdom) Luke Johnson (Zimbabwe) Benjamin Lock	2–6, 6–4, [10–8]
Loss	34–30	Nov 2023	Sydney, Australia	Challenger	Hard	(Philippines) Ruben Gonzales	(United States) Ryan Seggerman (United States) Patrik Trhac	4–6, 4–6
Loss	34–31	Nov 2023	Kobe, Japan	Challenger	Hard	(Australia) Andrew Harris	(United States) Evan King (United States) Reese Stalder	6–7^{(3–7)}, 6–2, [7–10]
Loss	34–32	Mar 2024	M15 Tsukuba, Japan	World Tennis Tour	Hard	(Chinese Taipei) Ray Ho	(Japan) Yusuke Kusuhara (Japan) Shunsuke Nakagawa	5–7, 6–7 ^{(4–7)}
Loss	34–33	Apr 2024	M15 Kashiwa, Japan	World Tennis Tour	Hard	(Chinese Taipei) Ray Ho	(Japan) Masamichi Imamura (Japan) Takeru Yuzuki	6–4, 2–6, [8-10]
Win	35–33	Apr 2024	Busan, South Korea	Challenger	Hard	(Chinese Taipei) Ray Ho	(South Korea) Chung Yun-seong (Chinese Taipei) Hsu Yu-hsiou	6–2, 6–4
Loss	35–34	Apr 2024	Guangzhou, China	Challenger	Hard	(Finland) Patrik Niklas-Salminen	(Australia) Blake Ellis (Australia) Tristan Schoolkate	2–6, 7–6^{(7–4)},[4–10]
Win	36–34	May 2024	Taipei, Taiwan	Challenger	Hard	(Chinese Taipei) Ray Ho	(Japan) Toshihide Matsui (Japan) Kaito Uesugi	6–2, 6–2
Loss	36–35	Oct 2024	Taipei, Taiwan	Challenger	Hard (i)	(United Kingdom) Joshua Paris	(United Kingdom) David Stevenson (United Kingdom) Marcus Willis	3–6, 3–6
Win	37–35	Mar 2025	M15 Hinode, Japan	World Tennis Tour	Hard	(South Korea) Shin San-hui	(Japan) Koki Matsuda (Japan) Taiyo Yamanaka	6–0, 6–4
Win	38–35	Mar 2025	M15 Nishitokyo, Japan	World Tennis Tour	Hard	(Japan) Kaito Uesugi	(Japan) Yusuke Kusuhara (Japan) Shunsuke Nakagawa	6–3, 6–1
Loss	38–36	Aug 2025	Grodzisk Mazowiecki, Poland	Challenger	Hard	(Japan) Takeru Yuzuki	(Netherlands) Thijmen Loof (France) Arthur Reymond	4–6, 7–6^{(7–3)},[14–16]
Win	39–36	Aug 2025	M15 Ma'anshan, China	World Tennis Tour	Hard (i)	(South Korea) Park Ui-sung	(South Korea) Cho Seong-woo (China) Yang Zijiang	6–3, 4–6, [10–7]
Win	40–36	Jan 2026	Phan Thiết, Vietnam	Challenger	Hard	(South Korea) Park Ui-sung	(Australia) Joshua Charlton (Spain) Iván Marrero Curbelo	6–4, 6–3
Win	41–36	Feb 2026	Pune, India	Challenger	Hard	(Finland) Patrik Niklas-Salminen	(Thailand) Pruchya Isaro (India) Niki Kaliyanda Poonacha	6–4, 6–7^{(1–7)}, [10–7]
Win	42–36	Mar 2026	Miyazaki, Japan	Challenger	Hard	(Finland) Patrik Niklas-Salminen	(Japan) Yuta Shimizu (Japan) James Trotter	7–5, 6–3
Win	43–36	Apr 2026	Jiujiang, China	Challenger	Hard	(Finland) Patrik Niklas-Salminen	(Chinese Taipei) Hsu Yu-hsiou (Japan) Seita Watanabe	6–4, 6–4
Loss	43–37	May 2026	Wuxi, China	Challenger	Hard	(Finland) Patrik Niklas-Salminen	(Netherlands) Jean-Julien Rojer (United States) Theodore Winegar	3–6, 6–7^{(6–8)}
Win	44–37	Jun 2026	Cary, United States	Challenger	Hard	(Finland) Patrik Niklas-Salminen	(New Zealand) Finn Reynolds (New Zealand) James Watt	5–7, 7–5, [10–8]
Win	45–37	Aug 2026	Zhangjiagang, China	Challenger	Hard	(South Korea) Park Ui-sung	(Australia) Joshua Charlton (China) Wang Aoran	6–3, 4–6, [13–11]
