= Chung Hong =

South Korean tennis player

Chung Hong 정홍
- Country (sports): South Korea
- Residence: Suwon, South Korea
- Born: 16 May 1993 (age 33) Suwon, South Korea
- Height: 1.70 m (5 ft 7 in)
- Plays: Left-handed (two handed-backhand)
- Prize money: $26,812

Singles
- Career record: 0–1 (at ATP Tour level, Grand Slam level, and in Davis Cup)
- Career titles: 1 ITF Futures
- Highest ranking: No. 632 (2 January 2017)

Doubles
- Career record: 0–1 (at ATP Tour level, Grand Slam level, and in Davis Cup)
- Career titles: 2 ITF Futures
- Highest ranking: No. 624 (9 June 2014)

Team competitions
- Davis Cup: 0–1
- Last updated on: 20 January 2025.

- Chung Hong
- Hangul: 정홍
- RR: Jeong Hong
- MR: Chŏng Hong

Chung Hong (Korean: 정홍; born 16 May 1993) is a South Korean inactive professional tennis player.

On the junior tour, Chung has a career high ITF junior ranking of 64 achieved in January 2011.

Chung has a career high ATP singles ranking of 632 achieved on 2 January 2017. He also has a career high ATP doubles ranking of 624 achieved on 9 June 2014. Chung has won one ITF Futures singles title and two ITF Futures doubles titles.

Playing for South Korea in Davis Cup, Chung has a win–loss record of 0–1.

Chung is the older brother of Chung Hyeon, who is also a professional tennis player.
