= Gwangju Open =

- 2024 Gwangju Open

ATP Challenger Tour
- Location: Gwangju, South Korea
- Venue: Jinwol International Tennis Court
- Category: ATP Challenger Tour
- Surface: Hard / Outdoors
- Draw: 32S/32Q/16D
- Prize money: $100,000 (2025), $82,000 (2024)
- Website: Website

The Gwangju Open is a tennis tournament held in Gwangju, South Korea since 2016. The event is part of the ATP Challenger Tour and is played on outdoor hardcourts.

== Past finals ==
=== Singles ===
Year	Champion	Runner-up	Score
2026	(South Korea) Kwon Soon-woo	(Denmark) August Holmgren	6–4, 7–5
2025	(Australia) Jason Kubler	Alibek Kachmazov	7–5, 6–7^{(7–9)}, 6–3
2024	(South Africa) Lloyd Harris	(China) Bu Yunchaokete	6–2, 3–6, 6–4
2023	(Australia) Jordan Thompson	(Australia) Max Purcell	6–3, 6–2
2022	(Hungary) Zsombor Piros	(Ecuador) Emilio Gómez	6–2, 6–4
2021– 2020	Not held		
2019	(Chinese Taipei) Jason Jung	(Israel) Dudi Sela	6–4, 6–2
2018	(Australia) Maverick Banes	(South Korea) Nam Ji-sung	6–3, 4–6, 6–4
2017	(Germany) Matthias Bachinger	(Chinese Taipei) Yang Tsung-hua	6–3, 6–4
2016	(Lithuania) Ričardas Berankis	(Slovenia) Grega Žemlja	6–3, 6–2

=== Doubles ===
Year	Champions	Runners-up	Score
2026	(United States) Mac Kiger (United States) Reese Stalder	(India) Anirudh Chandrasekar (Japan) Takeru Yuzuki	6–4, 6–7^{(7–9)}, [10–8]
2025	(Chinese Taipei) Ray Ho (Australia) Matthew Romios	(United States) Vasil Kirkov (Netherlands) Bart Stevens	6–3, 7–6^{(8–6)}
2024	(South Korea) Lee Jea-moon (South Korea) Song Min-kyu	(China) Cui Jie (South Korea) Lee Duck-hee	1–6, 6–1, [10–3]
2023	(United States) Evan King (United States) Reese Stalder	(Australia) Andrew Harris (Australia) John-Patrick Smith	6–4, 6–2
2022	(Colombia) Nicolás Barrientos (Mexico) Miguel Ángel Reyes-Varela	(India) Yuki Bhambri (India) Saketh Myneni	2–6, 6–3, [10–6]
2021– 2020	Not held		
2019	(Chinese Taipei) Hsieh Cheng-peng (Indonesia) Christopher Rungkat	(South Korea) Nam Ji-sung (South Korea) Song Min-kyu	6–3, 3–6, [10–6]
2018	(South Korea) Nam Ji-sung (South Korea) Song Min-kyu	(Zimbabwe) Benjamin Lock (New Zealand) Rubin Statham	5–7, 6–3, [10–5]
2017	(Chinese Taipei) Chen Ti (Japan) Ben McLachlan	(Australia) Jarryd Chaplin (Australia) Luke Saville	2–6, 7–6^{(7–1)}, [10–1]
2016	(Thailand) Sanchai Ratiwatana (Thailand) Sonchat Ratiwatana	(Denmark) Frederik Nielsen (Republic of Ireland) David O'Hare	6–3, 6–2
