= 2025 Wuxi Open – Singles =

Singles
- 2025 Wuxi Open

Final
- Champion: (China) Sun Fajing
- Runner-up: (Australia) Alex Bolt
- Score: 7–6^{(7–4)}, 6–4

Events
| Singles | Doubles |
| ← 2024 · | Wuxi Open | · 2026 → |

Bu Yunchaokete was the defending champion but chose not to defend his title.

Sun Fajing won the title after defeating Alex Bolt 7–6^{(7–4)}, 6–4 in the final.

== Seeds ==
1. (Australia) Adam Walton (first round, retired)
2. (Australia) Tristan Schoolkate (second round)
3. (France) Térence Atmane (semifinals)
4. (Australia) Li Tu (first round)
5. (France) Hugo Grenier (first round)
6. (Australia) James McCabe (first round, retired)
7. (France) Constant Lestienne (second round)
8. Alibek Kachmazov (second round)

== Draw ==
=== Key ===
- Q = Qualifier
- WC = Wild card
- LL = Lucky loser
- Alt = Alternate
- ITF = ITF entry
- PR = Protected ranking
- SR = Special ranking
- SE = Special exempt
- JE = Junior exempt
- JR = Junior Accelerator Programme entrant
- CO = College Accelerator Programme entrant
- NG = Next Gen Accelerator Program entrant
- w/o = Walkover
- r = Retired
- d = Defaulted

=== Finals ===
Semifinals
Ilia Simakin | 6 | 2 | 3
(China) Sun Fajing | 3 | 6 | 6
3 | (France) Térence Atmane | 3 | 4
(Australia) Alex Bolt | 6 | 6

Final
(China) Sun Fajing | 7^{7} | 6
(Australia) Alex Bolt | 6^{4} | 4

=== Top half ===
First round
1 | (Australia) A Walton | 4 | 1^{r}
Q | (United States) Andre Ilagan | 6 | 4
WC | (China) Charles Chen | 2 | 3
Q | (Japan) Y Takahashi | 6 | 6
WC | (China) R Te | 5 | 3^{r}
I Simakin | 7 | 3
(Chinese Taipei) Y-h Hsu | 3 | 4
8 | A Kachmazov | 6 | 6
4 | (Australia) L Tu | 5 | 1
(China) F Sun | 7 | 6
(France) A Escoffier | 6 | 6
(United States) Z Svajda | 2 | 1
(Japan) Y Watanuki | 1 | 7^{7} | 6
WC | (China) Y Zhou | 6 | 6^{3} | 4
(United Kingdom) R Peniston | 6 | 3
6 | (Australia) J McCabe | 2 | 2^{r}

Second round
Q | (United States) A Ilagan | 6^{3} | 6 | 3
Q | (Japan) Y Takahashi | 7^{7} | 4 | 6
I Simakin | 6 | 6
8 | A Kachmazov | 4 | 2
(China) F Sun | 6^{8} | 6 | 7
(France) A Escoffier | 7^{10} | 1 | 5
(Japan) Y Watanuki | 5 | 6 | 3
(United Kingdom) R Peniston | 7 | 4 | 6

Quarterfinals
Q | (Japan) Y Takahashi | 2 | 2
I Simakin | 6 | 6
(China) F Sun | 6 | 6
(United Kingdom) R Peniston | 4 | 0

Semifinals
I Simakin | 6 | 2 | 3
(China) F Sun | 3 | 6 | 6

=== Bottom half ===
First round
5 | (France) H Grenier | 2 | 6 | 0
(Japan) R Noguchi | 6 | 3 | 6
Q | (China) Z Li | 6 | 7^{7}
Q | (Japan) Shintaro Imai | 3 | 6^{5}
(United States) Christian Langmo | 3 | 3
(Chinese Taipei) T-l Wu | 6 | 6
PR | I Ivashka | 6^{2} | 6 | 2
3 | (France) T Atmane | 7^{7} | 4 | 6
7 | (France) C Lestienne | 6 | 6
(Japan) Y Uchiyama | 1 | 3
Q | (United States) E Zhu | 3 | 4
(Australia) A Bolt | 6 | 6
(China) J Cui | 7 | 4 | 6
Q | (Australia) M Bouzige | 5 | 6 | 4
(Australia) O Jasika | 6^{4} | 6^{8}
2 | (Australia) T Schoolkate | 7^{7} | 7^{10}

Second round
(Japan) R Noguchi | 6 | 6
Q | (China) Z Li | 2 | 4
(Chinese Taipei) T-l Wu | 4 | 6^{6}
3 | (France) T Atmane | 6 | 7^{8}
7 | (France) C Lestienne | 3 | 6 | 2
(Australia) A Bolt | 6 | 1 | 6
(China) J Cui | 6 | 6
2 | (Australia) T Schoolkate | 4 | 2

Quarterfinals
(Japan) R Noguchi | 4 | 2
3 | (France) T Atmane | 6 | 6
(Australia) A Bolt | 6 | 6
(China) J Cui | 2 | 3

Semifinals
3 | (France) T Atmane | 3 | 4
(Australia) A Bolt | 6 | 6
