= 2023 Seoul Open Challenger – Singles =

Singles
- 2023 Seoul Open Challenger

Final
- Champion: (China) Bu Yunchaokete
- Runner-up: (Australia) Aleksandar Vukic
- Score: 7–6^{(7–4)}, 6–4

Events
| Singles | Doubles |
| ← 2022 · | Seoul Open Challenger | · 2024 → |

Li Tu was the defending champion but lost in the first round to Emilio Gómez.

Bu Yunchaokete won the title after defeating Aleksandar Vukic 7–6^{(7–4)}, 6–4 in the final.

== Seeds ==
1. (Australia) Max Purcell (second round)
2. (United States) Christopher Eubanks (quarterfinals)
3. (Australia) Jordan Thompson (second round)
4. (Australia) James Duckworth (second round)
5. (Ecuador) Emilio Gómez (second round)
6. (Australia) Rinky Hijikata (quarterfinals)
7. (Australia) Aleksandar Vukic (final)
8. (United States) Denis Kudla (quarterfinals)

== Draw ==
=== Key ===
- Q = Qualifier
- WC = Wild card
- LL = Lucky loser
- Alt = Alternate
- SE = Special exempt
- PR = Protected ranking
- ITF = ITF entry
- JE = Junior exempt
- w/o = Walkover
- r = Retired
- d = Defaulted
- SR = Special ranking

=== Finals ===
Semifinals
(China) Bu Yunchaokete | 7^{7} | 6
Q | (Japan) Yasutaka Uchiyama | 6^{4} | 4
WC | (South Korea) Chung Yun-seong | 6^{5} | 1
7 | (Australia) Aleksandar Vukic | 7^{7} | 6

Final
(China) Bu Yunchaokete | 7^{7} | 6
7 | (Australia) Aleksandar Vukic | 6^{4} | 4

=== Top half ===
First round
1 | (Australia) M Purcell | 6 | 6
Q | (South Korea) J-s Nam | 3 | 4
(South Korea) S-c Hong | 6 | 6
Q | (Japan) T Ito | 3 | 2
(Turkey) A Çelikbilek | 6 | 3 | 1
(China) Y Bu | 3 | 6 | 6
(Australia) L Tu | 6^{4} | 5
5 | (Ecuador) E Gómez | 7^{7} | 7
4 | (Australia) J Duckworth | 7^{7} | 1 | 6
Q | (South Korea) D-h Lee | 6^{4} | 6 | 1
Q | (India) M Sasikumar | 4 | 7^{13} | 0
Q | (Japan) Y Uchiyama | 6 | 6^{11} | 6
(Australia) M Polmans | 6 | 6
WC | (South Korea) J-m Lee | 3 | 2
PR | (United States) T-S Kwiatkowski | 1 | 0
8 | (United States) D Kudla | 6 | 6

Second round
1 | (Australia) M Purcell | 1 | 3
(South Korea) S-c Hong | 6 | 6
(China) Y Bu | 6 | 6^{1} | 6
5 | (Ecuador) E Gómez | 4 | 7^{7} | 3
4 | (Australia) J Duckworth | 4 | 2
Q | (Japan) Y Uchiyama | 6 | 6
(Australia) M Polmans | 7 | 4 | 3
8 | (United States) D Kudla | 5 | 6 | 6

Quarterfinals
(South Korea) S-c Hong | 4 | 4
(China) Y Bu | 6 | 6
Q | (Japan) Y Uchiyama | 6 | 4 | 6
8 | (United States) D Kudla | 3 | 6 | 1

Semifinals
(China) Y Bu | 7^{7} | 6
Q | (Japan) Y Uchiyama | 6^{4} | 4

=== Bottom half ===
First round
6 | (Australia) R Hijikata | 6 | 7^{7}
(Japan) S Shimabukuro | 4 | 6^{3}
Alt | E Donskoy | 4 | 6 | 6
(United States) B Holt | 6 | 4 | 2
WC | (South Korea) Y-s Chung | 6 | 6
Q | (Germany) P Gojowczyk | 2 | 3
WC | (South Korea) Hy Chung | 2 | 4
3 | (Australia) J Thompson | 6 | 6
7 | (Australia) A Vukic | 7^{7} | 7^{7}
(South Africa) L Harris | 6^{3} | 6^{0}
(Turkey) C İlkel | 7^{7} | 2 | 4
(Lithuania) R Berankis | 6^{2} | 6 | 6
(Canada) G Diallo | 6 | 6
(Chinese Taipei) Y-h Hsu | 2 | 3
(Japan) Y Shimizu | 3 | 6 | 5
2 | (United States) C Eubanks | 6 | 3 | 7

Second round
6 | (Australia) R Hijikata | 6 | 6
Alt | E Donskoy | 3 | 4
WC | (South Korea) Y-s Chung | 6 | 6
3 | (Australia) J Thompson | 4 | 3
7 | (Australia) A Vukic | 6 | 6^{5} | 6
(Lithuania) R Berankis | 3 | 7^{7} | 1
(Canada) G Diallo | 6 | 3 | 2
2 | (United States) C Eubanks | 2 | 6 | 6

Quarterfinals
6 | (Australia) R Hijikata | 2 | 3
WC | (South Korea) Y-s Chung | 6 | 6
7 | (Australia) A Vukic | 7 | 6
2 | (United States) C Eubanks | 5 | 3

Semifinals
WC | (South Korea) Y-s Chung | 6^{5} | 1
7 | (Australia) A Vukic | 7^{7} | 6
