= 2022 Seoul Open Challenger =

- Date: 10 – 16 October
- Edition: 6th
- Surface: Hard
- Location: Seoul, South Korea

Champions

Singles
- (Australia) Li Tu

Doubles
- (Japan) Kaichi Uchida / (Chinese Taipei) Wu Tung-lin
← 2019 ·	Seoul Open Challenger	· 2023 →

The 2022 Seoul Open Challenger was a professional tennis tournament played on outdoor hard courts. It was the sixth edition of the tournament. It was part of the 2022 ATP Challenger Tour. It took place in Seoul, South Korea, between 10 and 16 October 2022.

== Singles main draw entrants ==
=== Seeds ===
Country	Player	Rank^{1}	Seed
MDA	Radu Albot	86	1
TPE	Tseng Chun-hsin	87	2
AUS	Alexei Popyrin	93	3
ECU	Emilio Gómez	102	4
AUS	Christopher O'Connell	106	5
AUS	James Duckworth	109	6
USA	Steve Johnson	112	7
POL	Kamil Majchrzak	121	8

- ^{1} Rankings as of 3 October 2022.

=== Other entrants ===
The following players received wildcards into the singles main draw:

- (South Korea) Chung Hong
- (South Korea) Kim Cheong-eui
- (South Korea) Kim Jang-jun

The following player received entry into the singles main draw using a protected ranking:

- (Australia) Marc Polmans

The following players received entry from the qualifying draw:

- (United States) Aleksandar Kovacevic
- (Japan) Shintaro Mochizuki
- (Japan) Hiroki Moriya
- (Japan) Naoki Nakagawa
- (Austria) Maximilian Neuchrist
- (Australia) Li Tu

== Champions ==
=== Singles ===
- (Australia) Li Tu def. (China) Wu Yibing 7–6^{(7–5)}, 6–4.

=== Doubles ===
- (Japan) Kaichi Uchida / (Chinese Taipei) Wu Tung-lin def. (South Korea) Chung Yun-seong / (United States) Aleksandar Kovacevic 6–7^{(2–7)}, 7–5, [11–9].
