= 2024 Keio Challenger – Men's doubles =

Men's doubles
- 2024 Keio Challenger

Final
- Champions: (Lebanon) Benjamin Hassan (India) Saketh Myneni
- Runners-up: (Australia) Blake Bayldon (Australia) Calum Puttergill
- Score: 6–2, 6–4

Events
Singles	men	women
Doubles	men	women
← 2023 ·	Keio Challenger	· 2025 →

Filip Bergevi and Mick Veldheer were the defending champions but chose not to defend their title.

Benjamin Hassan and Saketh Myneni won the title after defeating Blake Bayldon and Calum Puttergill 6–2, 6–4 in the final.

== Seeds ==
1. (South Korea) Nam Ji-sung / (Australia) Matthew Romios (semifinals)
2. (United States) Vasil Kirkov / (United Kingdom) Marcus Willis (quarterfinals)
3. (India) Anirudh Chandrasekar / (India) Niki Kaliyanda Poonacha (first round)
4. (Australia) Thomas Fancutt / (Switzerland) Jakub Paul (first round)

== Draw ==
=== Key ===
- Q = Qualifier
- WC = Wild card
- LL = Lucky loser
- Alt = Alternate
- ITF = ITF entry
- PR = Protected ranking
- SR = Special ranking
- SE = Special exempt
- JE = Junior exempt
- JR = Junior Accelerator Programme entrant
- CO = College Accelerator Programme entrant
- NG = Next Gen Accelerator Program entrant
- w/o = Walkover
- r = Retired
- d = Defaulted

=== Draw ===
First round
1	(South Korea) J-s Nam (Australia) MC Romios	5	6	[10]
(Peru) A Merino (Germany) C Negritu	7	4	[4]
(Australia) O Jasika (Australia) D Sweeny	2	1
(Chinese Taipei) R Ho (Thailand) P Isaro	6	6
3	(India) A Chandrasekar (India) N Kaliyanda Poonacha	6	6^{5}	[6]
(Japan) T Matsui (Japan) K Uesugi	3	7^{7}	[10]
(Australia) B Bayldon (Australia) C Puttergill	6	6
WC	(Japan) Hibiki Arimoto (Japan) Yusaku Sugaya	1	0
Alt	(South Africa) P Henning (South Africa) Kris van Wyk	6	5	[11]
WC	(Japan) Naoya Honda (Japan) Shogo Sanada	3	7	[13]
(Japan) Y Shimizu (Australia) L Tu	6	6
4	(Australia) T Fancutt (Switzerland) J Paul	4	4
(Lebanon) B Hassan (India) S Myneni	6	6
(Japan) Ryuki Matsuda (Japan) R Noguchi	3	2
(Japan) S Watanabe (Japan) T Yuzuki	3	4
2	(United States) V Kirkov (United Kingdom) M Willis	6	6

Quarterfinals
1	(South Korea) J-s Nam (Australia) MC Romios	7^{7}	3	[10]
(Chinese Taipei) R Ho (Thailand) P Isaro	6^{2}	6	[5]
(Japan) T Matsui (Japan) K Uesugi	3	6^{3}
(Australia) B Bayldon (Australia) C Puttergill	6	7^{7}
WC	(Japan) N Honda (Japan) S Sanada	w/o
(Japan) Y Shimizu (Australia) L Tu
(Lebanon) B Hassan (India) S Myneni	7^{8}	6^{4}	[11]
2	(United States) V Kirkov (United Kingdom) M Willis	6^{6}	7^{7}	[9]

Semifinals
1	(South Korea) J-s Nam (Australia) MC Romios	3	6	[4]
(Australia) B Bayldon (Australia) C Puttergill	6	2	[10]
WC	(Japan) N Honda (Japan) S Sanada	4	4
(Lebanon) B Hassan (India) S Myneni	6	6

Final
(Australia) B Bayldon (Australia) C Puttergill	2	4
(Lebanon) B Hassan (India) S Myneni	6	6
