= 2024 Wuxi Open – Doubles =

Doubles
- 2024 Wuxi Open

Final
- Champions: (Australia) Calum Puttergill (United States) Reese Stalder
- Runners-up: (Japan) Toshihide Matsui (Japan) Kaito Uesugi
- Score: 7–6^{(10–8)}, 7–6^{(7–4)}

Events
Singles	Doubles
Wuxi Open	· 2025 →

This was the first edition of the tournament.

Calum Puttergill and Reese Stalder won the title after defeating Toshihide Matsui and Kaito Uesugi 7–6^{(10–8)}, 7–6^{(7–4)} in the final.

== Seeds ==
1. (Australia) Calum Puttergill / (United States) Reese Stalder (champions)
2. (Poland) Piotr Matuszewski / (Australia) Matthew Romios (semifinals)
3. (South Korea) Nam Ji-sung / (Finland) Patrik Niklas-Salminen (semifinals)
4. (Japan) Toshihide Matsui / (Japan) Kaito Uesugi (final)

== Draw ==
Key

- Q = Qualifier
- WC = Wild card
- LL = Lucky loser
- Alt = Alternate
- ITF = ITF entry
- PR = Protected ranking
- SR = Special ranking
- SE = Special exempt
- JE = Junior exempt
- JR = Junior Accelerator Programme entrant
- CO = College Accelerator Programme entrant
- NG = Next Gen Accelerator Program entrant
- w/o = Walkover
- r = Retired
- d = Defaulted

=== Draw ===
First round
1	(Australia) C Puttergill (United States) R Stalder	6	4	[10]
Alt	(United States) A Ayeni (United Kingdom) A Fery	4	6	[5]
(France) A Escoffier (United Kingdom) J Paris	6	6
(Philippines) FC Alcantara (China) F Sun	4	2
3	(South Korea) J-s Nam (Finland) P Niklas-Salminen	6	6
(China) Z Li (China) Y Mo	4	1
WC	(China) J Cui (China) R Te
(Australia) O Jasika (Australia) J McCabe	w/o
(Australia) J Delaney (Australia) M Purcell	2	6	[11]
E Donskoy; E Gerasimov	6	1	[13]
WC	(China) A Wang (China) Y Zhou	6^{2}	7^{7}	[3]
4	(Japan) T Matsui (Japan) K Uesugi	7^{7}	6^{3}	[10]
(Australia) B Bayldon (Australia) B Ellis	2	2
(Chinese Taipei) R Ho (India) R Ramanathan	6	6
Alt	Mikalai Haliak (China) Xiao Linang	4	1
2	(Poland) P Matuszewski (Australia) MC Romios	6	6

Quarterfinals
1	(Australia) C Puttergill (United States) R Stalder	4	6	[10]
(France) A Escoffier (United Kingdom) J Paris	6	4	[1]
3	(South Korea) J-s Nam (Finland) P Niklas-Salminen	6	3	[12]
(Australia) O Jasika (Australia) J McCabe	3	6	[10]
E Donskoy; E Gerasimov	5	3
4	(Japan) T Matsui (Japan) K Uesugi	7	6
(Chinese Taipei) R Ho (India) R Ramanathan	6	3	[8]
2	(Poland) P Matuszewski (Australia) MC Romios	2	6	[10]

Semifinals
1	(Australia) C Puttergill (United States) R Stalder	7^{7}	2	[11]
3	(South Korea) J-s Nam (Finland) P Niklas-Salminen	6^{4}	6	[9]
4	(Japan) T Matsui (Japan) K Uesugi	6	4	[10]
2	(Poland) P Matuszewski (Australia) MC Romios	3	6	[7]

Final
1	(Australia) C Puttergill (United States) R Stalder	7^{10}	7^{7}
4	(Japan) T Matsui (Japan) K Uesugi	6^{8}	6^{4}
