= 2023 Keio Challenger – Men's singles =

Men's singles
- 2023 Keio Challenger

Final
- Champion: (Japan) Yosuke Watanuki
- Runner-up: (Japan) Yuta Shimizu
- Score: 7–6^{(7–5)}, 6–4

Events
Singles	men	women
Doubles	men	women
← 2022 ·	Keio Challenger	· 2024 →

Christopher O'Connell was the defending champion but chose not to defend his title.

Yosuke Watanuki won the title after defeating Yuta Shimizu 7–6^{(7–5)}, 6–4 in the final.

== Seeds ==
1. (Japan) Yosuke Watanuki (champion)
2. (Austria) Jurij Rodionov (first round)
3. (United States) Michael Mmoh (semifinals)
4. (Australia) James Duckworth (second round, withdrew)
5. (United States) Maxime Cressy (withdrew)
6. (Italy) Luca Nardi (quarterfinals)
7. (Australia) Marc Polmans (second round)
8. (Switzerland) Leandro Riedi (second round)

== Draw ==
=== Key ===
- Q = Qualifier
- WC = Wild card
- LL = Lucky loser
- Alt = Alternate
- ITF = ITF entry
- PR = Protected ranking
- SR = Special ranking
- SE = Special exempt
- JE = Junior exempt
- JR = Junior Accelerator Programme entrant
- CO = College Accelerator Programme entrant
- NG = Next Gen Accelerator Program entrant
- w/o = Walkover
- r = Retired
- d = Defaulted

=== Finals ===
Semifinals
1	(Japan) Yosuke Watanuki	6	6^{2}	6
3	(United States) Michael Mmoh	4	7^{7}	0
(Japan) Yuta Shimizu	w/o
Q	(Japan) Yasutaka Uchiyama

Final
1	(Japan) Yosuke Watanuki	7^{7}	6
(Japan) Yuta Shimizu	6^{5}	4

=== Top half ===
First round
1	(Japan) Y Watanuki	6	6
(Chinese Taipei) Y-h Hsu	3	3
Q	(Northern Mariana Islands) C Sinclair	3	2
LL	(France) Mathys Erhard	6	6
Q	(Denmark) A Holmgren	4	1
LL	(Italy) G Fonio	6	6
WC	(Japan) R Noguchi	2	2
8	(Switzerland) L Riedi	6	6
3	(United States) M Mmoh	6	6
(Tunisia) M Echargui	1	2
(France) G Blancaneaux	6	6^{1}	6
Q	(Australia) O Jasika	4	7^{7}	3
Q	(North Macedonia) K Ivanovski	6	5	6
(Belgium) Z Bergs	1	7	2
LL	(South Korea) Y-s Chung	2	4
6	(Italy) L Nardi	6	6

Second round
1	(Japan) Y Watanuki	6	6
LL	(France) M Erhard	4	3
LL	(Italy) G Fonio	4	7^{7}	6
8	(Switzerland) L Riedi	6	6^{4}	4
3	(United States) M Mmoh	6	5	7^{7}
(France) G Blancaneaux	4	7	6^{3}
Q	(North Macedonia) K Ivanovski	2	4
6	(Italy) L Nardi	6	6

Quarterfinals
1	(Japan) Y Watanuki	3	6	6
LL	(Italy) G Fonio	6	2	1
3	(United States) M Mmoh	7^{8}	2	6
6	(Italy) L Nardi	6^{6}	6	4

Semifinals
1	(Japan) Y Watanuki	6	6^{2}	6
3	(United States) M Mmoh	4	7^{7}	0

=== Bottom half ===
First round
7	(Australia) M Polmans	6	6
(Turkey) C İlkel	1	0
(Chinese Taipei) J Jung	4	5
(Japan) Y Shimizu	6	7
Alt	(Turkey) A Çelikbilek	6	3	2
(Hong Kong) C Wong	2	6	6
(Czech Republic) Z Kolář	2	7^{7}	2
4	(Australia) J Duckworth	6	6^{4}	6
Q	(Japan) N Nakagawa	6^{5}	6	2
(United States) A Martin	7^{7}	1	6
WC	(Japan) R Sakamoto	4	3
(Australia) L Tu	6	6
Q	(Japan) Y Uchiyama	6	6
WC	(Japan) M Imamura	1	1
(South Korea) S-c Hong	7^{8}	7^{8}
2	(Austria) J Rodionov	6^{6}	6^{6}

Second round
7	(Australia) M Polmans	4	4
(Japan) Y Shimizu	6	6
(Hong Kong) C Wong	w/o
4	(Australia) J Duckworth
(United States) A Martin	6	4	5
(Australia) L Tu	2	6	7
Q	(Japan) Y Uchiyama	2	6	6
(South Korea) S-c Hong	6	4	4

Quarterfinals
(Japan) Y Shimizu	7^{9}	6^{1}	7^{7}
(Hong Kong) C Wong	6^{7}	7^{7}	6^{4}
(Australia) L Tu	6^{1}	5
Q	(Japan) Y Uchiyama	7^{7}	7

Semifinals
(Japan) Y Shimizu	w/o
Q	(Japan) Y Uchiyama
