= 2026 Wuxi Open – Doubles =

Doubles
- 2026 Wuxi Open

Final
- Champions: (Netherlands) Jean-Julien Rojer (United States) Theodore Winegar
- Runners-up: (South Korea) Nam Ji-sung (Finland) Patrik Niklas-Salminen
- Score: 6–3, 7–6^{(8–6)}

Events
Singles	Doubles
- Wuxi Open

Vasil Kirkov and Bart Stevens were the defending champions but chose not to defend their title.

Jean-Julien Rojer and Theodore Winegar won the title after defeating Nam Ji-sung and Patrik Niklas-Salminen 6–3, 7–6^{(8–6)} in the final.

== Seeds ==
1. (Netherlands) Jean-Julien Rojer / (United States) Theodore Winegar (champions)
2. (India) Rithvik Choudary Bollipalli / (India) Arjun Kadhe (quarterfinals)
3. (Netherlands) Thijmen Loof / (Japan) Takeru Yuzuki (quarterfinals)
4. (United Kingdom) Ben Jones / (United Kingdom) Joshua Paris (first round)

== Draw ==
Key

- Q = Qualifier
- WC = Wild card
- LL = Lucky loser
- Alt = Alternate
- ITF = ITF entry
- PR = Protected ranking
- SR = Special ranking
- SE = Special exempt
- JE = Junior exempt
- JR = Junior Accelerator Programme entrant
- CO = College Accelerator Programme entrant
- NG = Next Gen Accelerator Program entrant
- w/o = Walkover
- r = Retired
- d = Defaulted

First round
1	(Netherlands) J-J Rojer (United States) T Winegar	6	6
WC	(China) F Sun (China) Zeng Yaojie	3	4
(Switzerland) L Castelnuovo (Australia) B Tomic	6	3	[6]
PR	(Japan) T Matsui (Japan) A Santillan	4	6	[10]
4	(United Kingdom) B Jones (United Kingdom) J Paris	7^{11}	4	[4]
Alt	(United States) A Ayeni (United States) K Smith	6^{9}	6	[10]
(Australia) C Puttergill (Australia) D Sweeny	6	7^{7}
WC	(China) Sun Qian (China) S Tang	1	6^{4}
(South Korea) J-s Nam (Finland) P Niklas-Salminen	6	6
PR	(India) S Myneni (India) R Ramanathan	4	3
(India) N Kaliyanda Poonacha (Germany) D Masur	6^{3}	5
3	(Netherlands) T Loof (Japan) T Yuzuki	7^{7}	7
(Chinese Taipei) Y-h Hsu (Japan) S Watanabe	1	6	[11]
(Chinese Taipei) J Jung (Japan) K Uesugi	6	4	[9]
(Chinese Taipei) T-h Huang (Australia) K Pearson	2	5
2	(India) RC Bollipalli (India) A Kadhe	6	7

Quarterfinals
1	(Netherlands) J-J Rojer (United States) T Winegar	6	6
PR	(Japan) T Matsui (Japan) A Santillan	3	1
Alt	(United States) A Ayeni (United States) K Smith	6	3	[11]
(Australia) C Puttergill (Australia) D Sweeny	3	6	[9]
(South Korea) J-s Nam (Finland) P Niklas-Salminen	7^{7}	6
3	(Netherlands) T Loof (Japan) T Yuzuki	6^{4}	1
(Chinese Taipei) Y-h Hsu (Japan) S Watanabe	6	6
2	(India) RC Bollipalli (India) A Kadhe	3	4

Semifinals
1	(Netherlands) J-J Rojer (United States) T Winegar	6	7^{7}
Alt	(United States) A Ayeni (United States) K Smith	3	6^{1}
(South Korea) J-s Nam (Finland) P Niklas-Salminen	6	5	[10]
(Chinese Taipei) Y-h Hsu (Japan) S Watanabe	4	7	[6]

Final
1	(Netherlands) J-J Rojer (United States) T Winegar	6	7^{8}
(South Korea) J-s Nam (Finland) P Niklas-Salminen	3	6^{6}
