= 2024 Wuxi Open – Singles =

Singles
- 2024 Wuxi Open

Final
- Champion: (China) Bu Yunchaokete
- Runner-up: Egor Gerasimov
- Score: 6–4, 6–1

Events
Singles	Doubles
Wuxi Open	· 2025 →

This was the first edition of the tournament.

Bu Yunchaokete won the title after defeating Egor Gerasimov 6–4, 6–1 in the final.

== Seeds ==
1. (Australia) Max Purcell (second round)
2. (Australia) James Duckworth (withdrew)
3. (Australia) Adam Walton (quarterfinals)
4. (China) Bu Yunchaokete (champion)
5. (United States) Maxime Cressy (first round)
6. (Italy) Mattia Bellucci (first round)
7. (Kazakhstan) Beibit Zhukayev (first round)
8. (South Korea) Hong Seong-chan (second round)
9. (Australia) Li Tu (first round)

== Draw ==
=== Key ===
- Q = Qualifier
- WC = Wild card
- LL = Lucky loser
- Alt = Alternate
- SE = Special exempt
- PR = Protected ranking
- ITF = ITF entry
- JE = Junior exempt
- w/o = Walkover
- r = Retired
- d = Defaulted
- SR = Special ranking

=== Finals ===
Semifinals
Alt	Egor Gerasimov	1	6	6
Alibek Kachmazov	6	3	4
4	(China) Bu Yunchaokete	7	1	6
(Australia) Philip Sekulic	5	6	4

Final
Alt	Egor Gerasimov	4	1
4	(China) Bu Yunchaokete	6	6

=== Top half ===
First round
1	(Australia) M Purcell	4	6	6
Q	(China) F Sun	6	1	1
Alt	(Japan) H Moriya	3	5
Alt	E Gerasimov	6	7
(Australia) T Schoolkate	7^{8}	7^{7}
WC	(China) Y Zhou	6^{6}	6^{5}
Q	(China) J Cui	2	7^{7}	6
6	(Italy) M Bellucci	6	6^{5}	2
3	(Australia) A Walton	6	6
Q	(Australia) J McCabe	2	3
(Australia) A Bolt	7^{7}	7^{7}
(France) A Escoffier	6^{1}	6^{3}
A Kachmazov	6	6
(Australia) L Saville	4	1
(Ukraine) I Marchenko	3	3
8	(South Korea) S-c Hong	6	6

Second round
1	(Australia) M Purcell	4	3
Alt	E Gerasimov	6	6
(Australia) T Schoolkate	5	6^{3}
Q	(China) J Cui	7	7^{7}
3	(Australia) A Walton	6	6
(Australia) A Bolt	1	3
A Kachmazov	6	2	7^{8}
8	(South Korea) S-c Hong	1	6	6^{6}

Quarterfinals
Alt	E Gerasimov	3	6	7
Q	(China) J Cui	6	4	5
3	(Australia) A Walton	3	6	2
A Kachmazov	6	1	6

Semifinals
Alt	E Gerasimov	1	6	6
A Kachmazov	6	3	4

=== Bottom half ===
First round
7	(Kazakhstan) B Zhukayev	3	4
(Chinese Taipei) T-l Wu	6	6
(Tunisia) M Echargui	6	6
Q	(China) Y Bai	1	1
Q	(China) Xiao Linang	6	6
WC	(China) H Li	3	2
(Australia) O Jasika	3	0
4	(China) Y Bu	6	6
5	(United States) M Cressy	4	4
Q	(Switzerland) R Bertola	6	6
Alt	E Donskoy	7^{9}	6^{4}	5
WC	(China) R Te	6^{7}	7^{7}	7
(United Kingdom) A Fery	6^{5}	4
(United States) B Holt	7^{7}	6
(Australia) P Sekulic	5	6	6
9	(Australia) L Tu	7	4	4

Second round
(Chinese Taipei) T-l Wu	6	6
(Tunisia) M Echargui	2	4
Q	(China) L Xiao	1	5
4	(China) Y Bu	6	7
Q	(Switzerland) R Bertola	7^{7}	6
WC	(China) R Te	6^{2}	3
(United States) B Holt	4	6	4
(Australia) P Sekulic	6	3	6

Quarterfinals
(Chinese Taipei) T-l Wu	4	3
4	(China) Y Bu	6	6
Q	(Switzerland) R Bertola	6^{4}	6	5
(Australia) P Sekulic	7^{7}	2	7

Semifinals
4	(China) Y Bu	7	1	6
(Australia) P Sekulic	5	6	4
