= 2025 Wuxi Open – Doubles =

Doubles
- 2025 Wuxi Open

Final
- Champions: (United States) Vasil Kirkov (Netherlands) Bart Stevens
- Runners-up: (Chinese Taipei) Ray Ho (Australia) Matthew Romios
- Score: 3–6, 7–5, [10–6]

Events
Singles	Doubles
- Wuxi Open

Calum Puttergill and Reese Stalder were the defending champions, but only Stalder chose to defend his title, partnering Blake Bayldon. They lost in the semifinals to Ray Ho and Matthew Romios.

Vasil Kirkov and Bart Stevens won the title after defeating Ho and Romios 3–6, 7–5, [10–6] in the final.

== Seeds ==
1. (Chinese Taipei) Ray Ho / (Australia) Matthew Romios (final)
2. (United States) Vasil Kirkov / (Netherlands) Bart Stevens (champions)
3. (Australia) Blake Bayldon / (United States) Reese Stalder (semifinals)
4. (Israel) Daniel Cukierman / (United Kingdom) Joshua Paris (first round)

== Draw ==
Key

- Q = Qualifier
- WC = Wild card
- LL = Lucky loser
- Alt = Alternate
- ITF = ITF entry
- PR = Protected ranking
- SR = Special ranking
- SE = Special exempt
- JE = Junior exempt
- JR = Junior Accelerator Programme entrant
- CO = College Accelerator Programme entrant
- NG = Next Gen Accelerator Program entrant
- w/o = Walkover
- r = Retired
- d = Defaulted

=== Draw ===
First round
1	(Chinese Taipei) R Ho (Australia) MC Romios	6	6
WC	(China) Y Mo (China) Xiao Linang	2	2
(Australia) O Jasika (Australia) K Pearson	2	2
WC	(China) Sun Qian (China) S Tang	6	6
3	(Australia) B Bayldon (United States) R Stalder	5	6	[11]
(Chinese Taipei) Y-h Hsu (China) A Wang	7	3	[9]
(Philippines) FC Alcantara (United Kingdom) R Peniston	5
Alt	(United States) Christian Langmo (Chinese Taipei) T-l Wu	6^{r}
(Japan) R Noguchi (Japan) K Uesugi	3	4
E Agafonov; I Simakin	6	6
(South Korea) J-s Nam (Japan) T Yuzuki	7^{9}	6
4	(Israel) D Cukierman (United Kingdom) J Paris	6^{7}	4
(India) R Ramanathan (China) F Sun	3	6	[10]
(Australia) Ja Delaney (Australia) Je Delaney	6	1	[7]
(France) A Escoffier (France) H Grenier
2	(United States) V Kirkov (Netherlands) B Stevens	^{w/o}

Quarterfinals
1	(Chinese Taipei) R Ho (Australia) MC Romios	6	6
WC	(China) Q Sun (China) S Tang	3	1
3	(Australia) B Bayldon (United States) R Stalder	6	7^{12}
(Philippines) FC Alcantara (United Kingdom) R Peniston	4	6^{10}
E Agafonov; I Simakin	6	6^{4}	[4]
(South Korea) J-s Nam (Japan) T Yuzuki	2	7^{7}	[10]
(India) R Ramanathan (China) F Sun	5	7^{7}	[5]
2	(United States) V Kirkov (Netherlands) B Stevens	7	6^{2}	[10]

Semifinals
1	(Chinese Taipei) R Ho (Australia) MC Romios	6	5	[10]
3	(Australia) B Bayldon (United States) R Stalder	2	7	[8]
(South Korea) J-s Nam (Japan) T Yuzuki	3	4
2	(United States) V Kirkov (Netherlands) B Stevens	6	6

Final
1	(Chinese Taipei) R Ho (Australia) MC Romios	6	5	[6]
2	(United States) V Kirkov (Netherlands) B Stevens	3	7	[10]
