= 2022 Keio Challenger – Men's singles =

Men's singles
- 2022 Keio Challenger

Final
- Champion: (Australia) Christopher O'Connell
- Runner-up: (Japan) Yosuke Watanuki
- Score: 6–1, 6–7^{(5–7)}, 6–3

Events
Singles	men	women
Doubles	men	women
← 2019 ·	Keio Challenger	· 2023 →

Kwon Soon-woo was the defending champion but chose not to defend his title.

Christopher O'Connell won the title after defeating Yosuke Watanuki 6–1, 6–7^{(5–7)}, 6–3 in the final.

== Seeds ==
1. (Australia) Christopher O'Connell (champion)
2. (Australia) John Millman (quarterfinals, withdrew)
3. (Japan) Kaichi Uchida (quarterfinals)
4. (Bosnia and Herzegovina) Damir Džumhur (quarterfinals)
5. (Chinese Taipei) Wu Tung-lin (quarterfinals)
6. (Japan) Hiroki Moriya (first round)
7. (Japan) Yosuke Watanuki (final)
8. (Czech Republic) Zdeněk Kolář (first round)

== Draw ==
=== Key ===
- Q = Qualifier
- WC = Wild card
- LL = Lucky loser
- Alt = Alternate
- ITF = ITF entry
- PR = Protected ranking
- SR = Special ranking
- SE = Special exempt
- JE = Junior exempt
- JR = Junior Accelerator Programme entrant
- CO = College Accelerator Programme entrant
- NG = Next Gen Accelerator Program entrant
- w/o = Walkover
- r = Retired
- d = Defaulted

=== Finals ===
Semifinals
1	(Australia) Christopher O'Connell	6	6
(Japan) Sho Shimabukuro	3	3
7	(Japan) Yosuke Watanuki	7	7^{7}
(Croatia) Nino Serdarušić	5	6^{5}

Final
1	(Australia) Christopher O'Connell	6	6^{5}	6
7	(Japan) Yosuke Watanuki	1	7^{7}	3

=== Top half ===
First round
1	(Australia) C O'Connell	6	7^{7}
(India) R Ramanathan	4	6^{3}
WC	(Japan) S Hazawa	4	2
(Turkey) E Kırkın	6	6
WC	(Japan) Tomoya Fujiwara	7^{8}	1	4
LL	(Japan) Rimpei Kawakami	6^{6}	6	6
PR	(Japan) Y Sugita	3	3
5	(Chinese Taipei) T-l Wu	6	6
4	(Bosnia and Herzegovina) D Džumhur	6	6
Q	(Japan) Ryota Tanuma	3	1
Q	(Japan) J Trotter	6	6
Q	(Sweden) J Mridha	4	1
(Japan) S Shimabukuro	6	6
Q	(Japan) Yuki Mochizuki	2	4
(Chinese Taipei) J Jung	6	6
8	(Czech Republic) Z Kolář	2	1

Second round
1	(Australia) C O'Connell	6	6
(Turkey) E Kırkın	3	4
LL	(Japan) R Kawakami	2	4
5	(Chinese Taipei) T-l Wu	6	6
4	(Bosnia and Herzegovina) D Džumhur	5	6	6
Q	(Japan) J Trotter	7	4	4
(Japan) S Shimabukuro	6	6
(Chinese Taipei) J Jung	4	3

Quarterfinals
1	(Australia) C O'Connell	6^{5}	7^{7}	6
5	(Chinese Taipei) T-l Wu	7^{7}	6^{4}	4
4	(Bosnia and Herzegovina) D Džumhur	4	1
(Japan) S Shimabukuro	6	6

Semifinals
1	(Australia) C O'Connell	6	6
(Japan) S Shimabukuro	3	3

=== Bottom half ===
First round
7	(Japan) Yo Watanuki	6	6
(Japan) N Nakagawa	4	4
(Vietnam) NH Lý	6	4	0
PR	(Japan) T Ito	4	6	6
WC	(Japan) M Imamura	3	4
(South Korea) Y-s Chung	6	6
Q	(South Korea) S-c Hong	6	5	3
3	(Japan) K Uchida	3	7	6
6	(Japan) H Moriya	6^{7}	6	4
(Romania) FC Jianu	7^{9}	0	6
(Japan) S Mochizuki	3	7^{7}	1
(Croatia) N Serdarušić	6	6^{5}	6
(Romania) ND Ionel	5	2
(Portugal) F Ferreira Silva	7	6
Q	(Japan) T Ichikawa	3	6^{5}
2	(Australia) J Millman	6	7^{7}

Second round
7	(Japan) Yo Watanuki	5	6	2
PR	(Japan) T Ito	7	0	1^{r}
(South Korea) Y-s Chung	6^{4}	3
3	(Japan) K Uchida	7^{7}	6
(Romania) FC Jianu	4	6	5
(Croatia) N Serdarušić	6	4	7
(Portugal) F Ferreira Silva	3	2
2	(Australia) J Millman	6	6

Quarterfinals
7	(Japan) Yo Watanuki	7	4	6
3	(Japan) K Uchida	5	6	3
(Croatia) N Serdarušić	w/o
2	(Australia) J Millman

Semifinals
7	(Japan) Yo Watanuki	7	7^{7}
(Croatia) N Serdarušić	5	6^{5}
