= 2024 Keio Challenger =

- Date: 18 – 24 November (men's); 25 November – 1 December (women's)
- Edition: 17th (men's); 7th (women's)
- Category: ATP Challenger Tour; ITF Women's World Tennis Tour
- Surface: Hard
- Location: Yokohama, Japan

Champions

Men's singles
- (Japan) Yuta Shimizu

Women's singles
- Aliona Falei

Men's doubles
- (Lebanon) Benjamin Hassan / (India) Saketh Myneni

Women's doubles
- (Japan) Momoko Kobori / (Japan) Ayano Shimizu
← 2023 ·	Keio Challenger	· 2025 →

The 2024 Yokohama Keio Challenger by Mita Kosan was a professional tennis tournament played on hardcourts. It was the 17th (men's) and 7th (women's) editions of the tournament and part of the 2024 ATP Challenger Tour and the 2024 ITF Women's World Tennis Tour. It took place in Yokohama, Japan between 18 November and 1 December 2024.

== Men's singles main-draw entrants ==
=== Seeds ===
Country	Player	Rank^{1}	Seed
ITA	Mattia Bellucci	104	1
JPN	Yasutaka Uchiyama	144	2
HKG	Coleman Wong	159	3
AUS	Alex Bolt	160	4
JPN	Sho Shimabukuro	177	5
AUS	Li Tu	178	6
AUT	Jurij Rodionov	197	7
FRA	Constant Lestienne	198	8

- ^{1} Rankings are as of 11 November 2024.

=== Other entrants ===
The following players received wildcards into the singles main draw:

- (Japan) Masamichi Imamura
- (Japan) Lennon Roark Jones
- (Japan) Rei Sakamoto

The following players received entry from the qualifying draw:

- (Italy) Federico Cinà
- (Australia) Omar Jasika
- (South Korea) Nam Ji-sung
- (Germany) Christoph Negritu
- (Switzerland) Jakub Paul
- (Australia) Philip Sekulic

== Women's singles main-draw entrants ==
=== Seeds ===
Country	Player	Rank^{1}	Seed
JPN	Aoi Ito	150	1
	Aliona Falei	197	2
JPN	Sayaka Ishii	200	3
CHN	Ma Yexin	236	4
USA	Hina Inoue	250	5
CAN	Carol Zhao	259	6
CHN	Yao Xinxin	263	7
JPN	Haruka Kaji	267	8

- ^{1} Rankings are as of 18 November 2024.

=== Other entrants ===
The following players received wildcards into the singles main draw:

- (Japan) Ena Koike
- (Japan) Rea Nakashima
- (Japan) Hina Nishi
- (Japan) Remika Ohashi

The following player received entry into the singles main draw using a special ranking:

- (Indonesia) Priska Madelyn Nugroho

The following players received entry from the qualifying draw:

- (Japan) Mayuka Aikawa
- (Japan) Shiho Akita
- (China) Dang Yiming
- (Japan) Natsumi Kawaguchi
- (South Korea) Lee Eun-hye
- (Japan) Makoto Ninomiya
- (Japan) Kayo Nishimura
- Ekaterina Shalimova

== Champions ==
=== Men's singles ===
- (Japan) Yuta Shimizu def. (Australia) Li Tu 6–7^{(4–7)}, 6–4, 6–2.

=== Women's singles ===
- Aliona Falei def. (United States) Hina Inoue 3–6, 6–1, 6–4

=== Men's doubles ===
- (Lebanon) Benjamin Hassan / (India) Saketh Myneni def. (Australia) Blake Bayldon / (Australia) Calum Puttergill 6–2, 6–4.

=== Women's doubles ===
- (Japan) Momoko Kobori / (Japan) Ayano Shimizu def. (Chinese Taipei) Cho I-hsuan / (Chinese Taipei) Cho Yi-tsen 6–4, 7–6^{(7–2)}
