= 2026 Wuxi Open – Singles =

Singles
- 2026 Wuxi Open

Final
- Champion: (South Korea) Kwon Soon-woo
- Runner-up: (China) Bu Yunchaokete
- Score: 6–2, 7–6^{(7–2)}

Events
| Singles | Doubles |
- Wuxi Open

Sun Fajing was the defending champion but lost in the second round to Rio Noguchi.

Kwon Soon-woo won the title after defeating Bu Yunchaokete 6–2, 7–6^{(7–2)} in the final.

== Seeds ==
1. (Australia) Adam Walton (quarterfinals)
2. (Hong Kong) Coleman Wong (first round)
3. (Australia) Dane Sweeny (quarterfinals)
4. (Australia) Alex Bolt (first round)
5. (China) Bu Yunchaokete (final)
6. (Estonia) Mark Lajal (semifinals)
7. (Australia) Bernard Tomic (first round)
8. (Canada) Alexis Galarneau (first round)

== Draw ==
Key

- Q = Qualifier
- WC = Wild card
- LL = Lucky loser
- Alt = Alternate
- ITF = ITF entry
- PR = Protected ranking
- SR = Special ranking
- SE = Special exempt
- JE = Junior exempt
- JR = Junior Accelerator Programme entrant
- CO = College Accelerator Programme entrant
- NG = Next Gen Accelerator Program entrant
- w/o = Walkover
- r = Retired
- d = Defaulted

=== Finals ===
Semifinals
5 | (China) Bu Yunchaokete | 6 | 7
WC | (China) Cui Jie | 1 | 5
6 | (Estonia) Mark Lajal | 6^{5} | 3
(South Korea) Kwon Soon-woo | 7^{7} | 6

Final
5 | (China) Bu Yunchaokete | 2 | 6^{2}
(South Korea) Kwon Soon-woo | 6 | 7^{7}

=== Top half ===
First round
1 | (Australia) A Walton | 6 | 6
(Chinese Taipei) Y-h Hsu | 4 | 4
(Chinese Taipei) T-l Wu | 5 | 6^{4}
(Australia) J McCabe | 7 | 7^{7}
Q | (Switzerland) L Castelnuovo | 3 | 6 | 1
Q | (Serbia) O Milić | 6 | 3 | 6
(United States) K Smith | 4 | 5
5 | (China) Y Bu | 6 | 7
4 | (Australia) A Bolt | 7^{9} | 3 | 3
(China) F Sun | 6^{7} | 6 | 6
(Japan) R Noguchi | 6 | 7
Q | P Bar Biryukov | 2 | 5
(Japan) Y Uchiyama | 3 | 0
(United Kingdom) A Gray | 6 | 6
WC | (China) J Cui | 6 | 6
8 | (Canada) A Galarneau | 4 | 2

Second round
1 | (Australia) A Walton | 6 | 7^{7}
(Australia) J McCabe | 3 | 6^{1}
Q | (Serbia) O Milić | 4 | 3
5 | (China) Y Bu | 6 | 6
(China) F Sun | 6^{2} | 6 | 6^{6}
(Japan) R Noguchi | 7^{7} | 4 | 7^{8}
(United Kingdom) A Gray | 6 | 6^{6} | 4
WC | (China) J Cui | 3 | 7^{8} | 6

Quarterfinals
1 | (Australia) A Walton | 2 | 0
5 | (China) Y Bu | 6 | 6
(Japan) R Noguchi | 6^{3} | 6^{4}
WC | (China) J Cui | 7^{7} | 7^{7}

Semifinals
5 | (China) Y Bu | 6 | 7
WC | (China) J Cui | 1 | 5

=== Bottom half ===
First round
6 | (Estonia) M Lajal | 7^{7} | 6
(Japan) Renta Tokuda | 6^{2} | 4
(Kazakhstan) M Kukushkin | 7^{7} | 6
WC | (China) Zhang Tianhui | 6^{4} | 3
PR | (Chinese Taipei) J Jung | 4 | 4
Q | (United States) Andre Ilagan | 6 | 6
WC | (China) R Te | 0 | 6^{5}
3 | (Australia) D Sweeny | 6 | 7^{7}
7 | (Australia) B Tomic | 6^{3} | 6^{3}
Q | (United States) A Ayeni | 7^{7} | 7^{7}
(South Korea) S-w Kwon | 6 | 6
(Japan) K Uchida | 2 | 2
Q | (Japan) H Matsuoka | 4 | 4
(Thailand) M Jones | 6 | 6
(Japan) A Santillan | 6 | 6
2 | (Hong Kong) C Wong | 4 | 2

Second round
6 | (Estonia) M Lajal | 7^{10} | 6^{2} | 7^{7}
(Kazakhstan) M Kukushkin | 6^{8} | 7^{7} | 6^{2}
Q | (United States) A Ilagan | 3 | 7^{7} | 4
3 | (Australia) D Sweeny | 6 | 6^{2} | 6
Q | (United States) A Ayeni | 4 | 6^{7}
(South Korea) S-w Kwon | 6 | 7^{9}
(Thailand) M Jones | 6^{3} | 4
(Japan) A Santillan | 7^{7} | 6

Quarterfinals
6 | (Estonia) M Lajal | 7 | 6
3 | (Australia) D Sweeny | 5 | 3
(South Korea) S-w Kwon | 6 | 3 | 6
(Japan) A Santillan | 1 | 6 | 2

Semifinals
6 | (Estonia) M Lajal | 6^{5} | 3
(South Korea) S-w Kwon | 7^{7} | 6
