= 2023 Keio Challenger =

- Date: 20 – 26 November (men's); 27 November – 3 December (women's)
- Edition: 16th (men's); 6th (women's)
- Category: ATP Challenger Tour; ITF Women's World Tennis Tour
- Surface: Hard
- Location: Yokohama, Japan

Champions

Men's singles
- (Japan) Yosuke Watanuki

Women's singles
- Aliona Falei

Men's doubles
- (Sweden) Filip Bergevi / (Netherlands) Mick Veldheer

Women's doubles
- (Chinese Taipei) Liang En-shuo / (China) Tang Qianhui
← 2022 ·	Keio Challenger	· 2024 →

The 2023 Keio Challenger was a professional tennis tournament played on hard courts. It was the 16th (men's) and 6th (women's) editions of the tournament and part of the 2023 ATP Challenger Tour and the 2023 ITF Women's World Tennis Tour. It took place in Yokohama, Japan between 20 November and 3 December 2023.

== Men's singles main-draw entrants ==
=== Seeds ===
Country	Player	Rank^{1}	Seed
JPN	Yosuke Watanuki	81	1
AUT	Jurij Rodionov	107	2
USA	Michael Mmoh	109	3
AUS	James Duckworth	113	4
~~USA~~	~~Maxime Cressy~~	~~127~~	~~5~~
ITA	Luca Nardi	128	6
AUS	Marc Polmans	158	7
SUI	Leandro Riedi	160	8

- ^{1} Rankings are as of 13 November 2023.

=== Other entrants ===
The following players received wildcards into the singles main draw:

- (Japan) Masamichi Imamura
- (Japan) Rio Noguchi
- (Japan) Rei Sakamoto

The following player received entry into the singles main draw as an alternate:

- (Turkey) Altuğ Çelikbilek

The following players received entry from the qualifying draw:

- (Denmark) August Holmgren
- (North Macedonia) Kalin Ivanovski
- (Australia) Omar Jasika
- (Japan) Naoki Nakagawa
- (Northern Mariana Islands) Colin Sinclair
- (Japan) Yasutaka Uchiyama

The following players received entry as lucky losers:

- (South Korea) Chung Yun-seong
- (France) Mathys Erhard
- (Italy) Giovanni Fonio

== Champions ==
=== Men's singles ===
- (Japan) Yosuke Watanuki def. (Japan) Yuta Shimizu 7–6^{(7–5)}, 6–4.

=== Women's singles ===
- Aliona Falei def. (Japan) Ayano Shimizu, 6–3, 7–5

=== Men's doubles ===
- (Sweden) Filip Bergevi / (Netherlands) Mick Veldheer def. (Chinese Taipei) Ray Ho / (Australia) Calum Puttergill 2–6, 7–5, [11–9].

=== Women's doubles ===
- (Chinese Taipei) Liang En-shuo / (China) Tang Qianhui def. (Japan) Aoi Ito / (Japan) Natsumi Kawaguchi, Walkover
