= 2022 Keio Challenger – Men's doubles =

Men's doubles
- 2022 Keio Challenger

Final
- Champions: (Romania) Victor Vlad Cornea (Philippines) Ruben Gonzales
- Runners-up: (Japan) Tomoya Fujiwara (Japan) Masamichi Imamura
- Score: 7–5, 6–3

Events
Singles	men	women
Doubles	men	women
← 2019 ·	Keio Challenger	· 2023 →

Moez Echargui and Skander Mansouri were the defending champions but chose not to defend their title.

Victor Vlad Cornea and Ruben Gonzales won the title after defeating Tomoya Fujiwara and Masamichi Imamura 7–5, 6–3 in the final.

== Seeds ==
1. (India) Arjun Kadhe / (India) Ramkumar Ramanathan (quarterfinals)
2. (Australia) Andrew Harris / (Australia) John-Patrick Smith (first round)
3. (Romania) Victor Vlad Cornea / (Philippines) Ruben Gonzales (champions)
4. (South Korea) Nam Ji-sung / (South Korea) Song Min-kyu (quarterfinals)

== Draw ==
=== Key ===
- Q = Qualifier
- WC = Wild card
- LL = Lucky loser
- Alt = Alternate
- ITF = ITF entry
- PR = Protected ranking
- SR = Special ranking
- SE = Special exempt
- JE = Junior exempt
- JR = Junior Accelerator Programme entrant
- CO = College Accelerator Programme entrant
- NG = Next Gen Accelerator Program entrant
- w/o = Walkover
- r = Retired
- d = Defaulted

First round
1	(India) A Kadhe (India) R Ramanathan	6	2	[10]
(Bosnia and Herzegovina) D Džumhur (Croatia) N Serdarušić	1	6	[6]
(Turkey) E Kırkın (Sweden) J Mridha	7	5	[6]
Alt	(Japan) T Ichikawa (Japan) Yuki Mochizuki	5	7	[10]
3	(Romania) VV Cornea (Philippines) R Gonzales	3	7	[10]
(Japan) S Shimabukuro (Japan) Yo Watanuki	6	5	[6]
S Danilov (Japan) Daisuke Sumizawa	3	5
(Romania) ND Ionel (Romania) FC Jianu	6	7
(Philippines) FC Alcantara (Vietnam) NH Lý	3	2
WC	(Japan) Tomoya Fujiwara (Japan) M Imamura	6	6
(Japan) T Matsui (Japan) K Uesugi	3	6^{7}
4	(South Korea) J-s Nam (South Korea) M-k Song	6	7^{9}
(Japan) Makoto Ochi (Japan) J Trotter	1	1
WC	(Japan) S Hazawa (Japan) S Mochizuki	6	6
(Portugal) F Ferreira Silva (Czech Republic) Z Kolář	6	4	[13]
2	(Australia) A Harris (Australia) J-P Smith	3	6	[11]

Quarterfinals
1	(India) A Kadhe (India) R Ramanathan	7^{7}	2	[10]
Alt	(Japan) T Ichikawa (Japan) Y Mochizuki	6^{5}	6	[12]
3	(Romania) VV Cornea (Philippines) R Gonzales	6	5	[10]
(Romania) ND Ionel (Romania) FC Jianu	2	7	[6]
WC	(Japan) T Fujiwara (Japan) M Imamura	3	6	[10]
4	(South Korea) J-s Nam (South Korea) M-k Song	6	2	[7]
WC	(Japan) S Hazawa (Japan) S Mochizuki	2	6	[10]
(Portugal) F Ferreira Silva (Czech Republic) Z Kolář	6	2	[12]

Semifinals
Alt	(Japan) T Ichikawa (Japan) Y Mochizuki	6^{5}	6^{2}
3	(Romania) VV Cornea (Philippines) R Gonzales	7^{7}	7^{7}
WC	(Japan) T Fujiwara (Japan) M Imamura	w/o
(Portugal) F Ferreira Silva (Czech Republic) Z Kolář

Final
3	(Romania) VV Cornea (Philippines) R Gonzales	7	6
WC	(Japan) T Fujiwara (Japan) M Imamura	5	3
