= 2024 Wuxi Open =

- Date: 6–12 May
- Edition: 1st
- Surface: Hard
- Location: Wuxi, China

Champions

Singles
- (China) Bu Yunchaokete

Doubles
- (Australia) Calum Puttergill / (United States) Reese Stalder
Wuxi Open	· 2025 →

The 2024 Wuxi Open was a professional tennis tournament played on hard courts. It was the first edition of the tournament which was part of the 2024 ATP Challenger Tour. It took place in Wuxi, China between 6 and 12 May 2024.

== Singles main-draw entrants ==
=== Seeds ===
Country	Player	Rank^{1}	Seed
AUS	Max Purcell	80	1
~~AUS~~	~~James Duckworth~~	~~113~~	~~2~~
AUS	Adam Walton	119	3
CHN	Bu Yunchaokete	167	4
USA	Maxime Cressy	178	5
ITA	Mattia Bellucci	181	6
KAZ	Beibit Zhukayev	182	7
KOR	Hong Seong-chan	187	8
AUS	Li Tu	193	9

- ^{1} Rankings as of 22 April 2024.

=== Other entrants ===
The following players received wildcards into the singles main draw:

- (China) Li Hanwen
- (China) Te Rigele
- (China) Zhou Yi

The following players received entry into the singles main draw as alternates:

- Evgeny Donskoy
- Egor Gerasimov
- (Japan) Hiroki Moriya

The following players received entry from the qualifying draw:

- (China) Bai Yan
- (Switzerland) Rémy Bertola
- (China) Cui Jie
- (Australia) James McCabe
- (China) Sun Fajing
- (China) Xiao Linang

== Champions ==
=== Singles ===
- (China) Bu Yunchaokete def. Egor Gerasimov 6–4, 6–1.

=== Doubles ===
- (Australia) Calum Puttergill / (United States) Reese Stalder def. (Japan) Toshihide Matsui / (Japan) Kaito Uesugi 7–6^{(10–8)}, 7–6^{(7–4)}.
