= 2025 Wuxi Open =

- Date: 5–11 May
- Edition: 2nd
- Surface: Hard
- Location: Wuxi, China

Champions

Singles
- (China) Sun Fajing

Doubles
- (United States) Vasil Kirkov / (Netherlands) Bart Stevens
← 2024 ·	Wuxi Open	· 2026 →

The 2025 Wuxi Open was a professional tennis tournament played on hard courts. It was the second edition of the tournament which was part of the 2025 ATP Challenger Tour. It took place in Wuxi, China between 5 and 11 May 2025.

== Singles main-draw entrants ==
=== Seeds ===
Country	Player	Rank^{1}	Seed
AUS	Adam Walton	86	1
AUS	Tristan Schoolkate	122	2
FRA	Térence Atmane	136	3
AUS	Li Tu	164	4
FRA	Hugo Grenier	175	5
AUS	James McCabe	176	6
FRA	Constant Lestienne	180	7
	Alibek Kachmazov	185	8

- ^{1} Rankings as of 21 April 2025.

=== Other entrants ===
The following players received wildcards into the singles main draw:

- (China) Charles Chen
- (China) Te Rigele
- (China) Zhou Yi

The following player received entry into the singles main draw using a protected ranking:

- Ilya Ivashka

The following players received entry from the qualifying draw:

- (Australia) Moerani Bouzige
- (United States) Andre Ilagan
- (Japan) Shintaro Imai
- (China) Li Zhe
- (Japan) Yusuke Takahashi
- (United States) Evan Zhu

== Champions ==
=== Singles ===
- (China) Sun Fajing def. (Australia) Alex Bolt 7–6^{(7–4)}, 6–4.

=== Doubles ===
- (United States) Vasil Kirkov / (Netherlands) Bart Stevens def. (Chinese Taipei) Ray Ho / (Australia) Matthew Romios 3–6, 7–5, [10–6].
