= 2023 Seoul Open Challenger – Doubles =

Doubles
- 2023 Seoul Open Challenger

Final
- Champions: (Australia) Max Purcell (Japan) Yasutaka Uchiyama
- Runners-up: (South Korea) Chung Yun-seong (Japan) Yuta Shimizu
- Score: 6–1, 6–4

Events
Singles	Doubles
← 2022 ·	Seoul Open Challenger	· 2024 →

Kaichi Uchida and Wu Tung-lin were the defending champions but chose not to defend their title.

Max Purcell and Yasutaka Uchiyama won the title after defeating Chung Yun-seong and Yuta Shimizu 6–1, 6–4 in the final.

== Seeds ==
1. (Australia) Rinky Hijikata / (Australia) Marc Polmans (quarterfinals)
2. (Australia) Andrew Harris / (Australia) John-Patrick Smith (quarterfinals)
3. (Philippines) Ruben Gonzales / (United States) Reese Stalder (first round)
4. (India) Anirudh Chandrasekar / (India) Vijay Sundar Prashanth (first round)

== Draw ==
=== Key ===
- Q = Qualifier
- WC = Wild card
- LL = Lucky loser
- Alt = Alternate
- SE = Special exempt
- PR = Protected ranking
- ITF = ITF entry
- JE = Junior exempt
- w/o = Walkover
- r = Retired
- d = Defaulted
- SR = Special ranking

First round
1	(Australia) R Hijikata (Australia) M Polmans	6	6
(South Korea) J-s Nam (South Korea) M-k Song	3	4
(Australia) L Saville (Australia) T Schoolkate	6^{3}	3
(Australia) M Purcell (Japan) Y Uchiyama	7^{7}	6
4	(India) A Chandrasekar (India) VS Prashanth	7	3	[6]
(Canada) G Diallo (Australia) A Vukic	5	6	[10]
(Japan) T Matsui (Japan) K Uesugi	4	6	[10]
WC	(South Korea) Jeong Yeong-seok (South Korea) J-m Lee	6	3	[4]
(Ecuador) E Gómez (United States) B Holt	2	4
(India) A Kadhe (India) P Raja	6	6
PR	(United States) D Kudla (United States) T-S Kwiatkowski	6	6
3	(Philippines) R Gonzales (United States) R Stalder	4	3
(South Korea) Y-s Chung (Japan) Y Shimizu	6	3	[11]
(Chinese Taipei) Y-h Hsu (Japan) S Shimabukuro	2	6	[9]
WC	(South Korea) Shin San-hui (South Korea) Son Ji-hoon	4	6	[5]
2	(Australia) A Harris (Australia) J-P Smith	6	3	[10]

Quarterfinals
1	(Australia) R Hijikata (Australia) M Polmans	4	6	[5]
(Australia) M Purcell (Japan) Y Uchiyama	6	3	[10]
(Canada) G Diallo (Australia) A Vukic	2	6	[6]
(Japan) T Matsui (Japan) K Uesugi	6	3	[10]
(India) A Kadhe (India) P Raja	w/o
PR	(United States) D Kudla (United States) T-S Kwiatkowski
(South Korea) Y-s Chung (Japan) Y Shimizu	6	6
2	(Australia) A Harris (Australia) J-P Smith	4	3

Semifinals
(Australia) M Purcell (Japan) Y Uchiyama	6	6
(Japan) T Matsui (Japan) K Uesugi	3	3
(India) A Kadhe (India) P Raja	6	1	[5]
(South Korea) Y-s Chung (Japan) Y Shimizu	1	6	[10]

Final
(Australia) M Purcell (Japan) Y Uchiyama	6	6
(South Korea) Y-s Chung (Japan) Y Shimizu	1	4
