= 2022 Seoul Open Challenger – Singles =

Singles
- 2022 Seoul Open Challenger

Final
- Champion: (Australia) Li Tu
- Runner-up: (China) Wu Yibing
- Score: 7–6^{(7–5)}, 6–4

Events
Singles	Doubles
← 2019 ·	Seoul Open Challenger	· 2023 →

Kwon Soon-woo was the defending champion but chose not to defend his title.

Qualifier Li Tu won his first Challenger title, defeating Wu Yibing 7–6^{(7–5)}, 6–4 in the final.

== Seeds ==
1. (Moldova) Radu Albot (first round)
2. (Chinese Taipei) Tseng Chun-hsin (first round)
3. (Australia) Alexei Popyrin (first round)
4. (Ecuador) Emilio Gómez (first round)
5. (Australia) Christopher O'Connell (quarterfinals)
6. (Australia) James Duckworth (semifinals)
7. (United States) Steve Johnson (second round)
8. (Poland) Kamil Majchrzak (semifinals)

== Draw ==
=== Key ===
- Q = Qualifier
- WC = Wild card
- LL = Lucky loser
- Alt = Alternate
- SE = Special exempt
- PR = Protected ranking
- ITF = ITF entry
- JE = Junior exempt
- w/o = Walkover
- r = Retired
- d = Defaulted
- SR = Special ranking

=== Finals ===
Semifinals
(China) Wu Yibing	6	3	6
8	(Poland) Kamil Majchrzak	3	6	4
Q	(Australia) Li Tu	6	6
6	(Australia) James Duckworth	4	3

Final
(China) Wu Yibing	6^{5}	4
Q	(Australia) Li Tu	7^{7}	6

=== Top half ===
First round
1	(Moldova) R Albot	0	6	2
(China) Y Wu	6	4	6
(Germany) C-M Stebe	7	6^{6}	6
(Australia) A Vukic	5	7^{8}	4
(United States) C Eubanks	7^{8}	4	4
(Czech Republic) D Svrčina	6^{6}	6	6
WC	(South Korea) Kim Cheong-eui	3	2
7	(United States) S Johnson	6	6
4	(Ecuador) E Gómez	7	4	4
Q	(Japan) S Mochizuki	5	6	6
PR	(Australia) M Polmans	6	3	4
Q	(Austria) M Neuchrist	3	6	6
(Australia) J Millman	6	6
Q	(Japan) H Moriya	3	1
(United Kingdom) J Clarke	2	2
8	(Poland) K Majchrzak	6	6

Second round
(China) Y Wu	6	6
(Germany) C-M Stebe	2	4
(Czech Republic) D Svrčina	6	3	6
7	(United States) S Johnson	2	6	1
Q	(Japan) S Mochizuki	6	2	6
Q	(Austria) M Neuchrist	4	6	4
(Australia) J Millman	6	3	2
8	(Poland) K Majchrzak	2	6	6

Quarterfinals
(China) Y Wu	6	6
(Czech Republic) D Svrčina	2	4
Q	(Japan) S Mochizuki	3	0
8	(Poland) K Majchrzak	6	6

Semifinals
(China) Y Wu	6	3	6
8	(Poland) K Majchrzak	3	6	4

=== Bottom half ===
First round
5	(Australia) C O'Connell	5	6	7^{8}
(United Kingdom) R Peniston	7	3	6^{6}
WC	(South Korea) Kim Jang-jun	1	2
(Australia) R Hijikata	6	6
(Japan) K Uchida	4	0
Q	(Australia) L Tu	6	6
Q	(Japan) N Nakagawa	3	7	7^{8}
3	(Australia) A Popyrin	6	5	6^{6}
6	(Australia) J Duckworth	7^{8}	6
Q	(United States) A Kovacevic	6^{6}	3
WC	(South Korea) Ho Chung	4	6	3
(Hungary) Z Piros	6	3	0^{r}
(Belgium) K Coppejans	6	6
(Chinese Taipei) T-l Wu	3	4
(Germany) M Marterer	6	6
2	(Chinese Taipei) C-h Tseng	3	2

Second round
5	(Australia) C O'Connell	6	6
(Australia) R Hijikata	4	1
Q	(Australia) L Tu	6	6
Q	(Japan) N Nakagawa	3	2
6	(Australia) J Duckworth	7^{8}	6
WC	(South Korea) Ho Chung	6^{6}	1
(Belgium) K Coppejans	3	4
(Germany) M Marterer	6	6

Quarterfinals
5	(Australia) C O'Connell	4	7^{7}	1
Q	(Australia) L Tu	6	6^{4}	6
6	(Australia) J Duckworth	4	7^{8}	6
(Germany) M Marterer	6	6^{6}	3

Semifinals
Q	(Australia) L Tu	6	6
6	(Australia) J Duckworth	4	3
