= 2022 Seoul Open Challenger – Doubles =

Doubles
- 2022 Seoul Open Challenger

Final
- Champions: (Japan) Kaichi Uchida (Chinese Taipei) Wu Tung-lin
- Runners-up: (South Korea) Chung Yun-seong (United States) Aleksandar Kovacevic
- Score: 6–7^{(2–7)}, 7–5, [11–9]

Events
Singles	Doubles
- Seoul Open Challenger

Max Purcell and Luke Saville were the defending champions but only Purcell chose to defend his title, partnering Marc Polmans. Purcell withdrew before his semifinal match against Chung Yun-seong and Aleksandar Kovacevic due to injury.

Kaichi Uchida and Wu Tung-lin won the title after defeating Chung and Kovacevic 6–7^{(2–7)}, 7–5, [11–9] in the final.

== Seeds ==
1. (India) Yuki Bhambri / (India) Saketh Myneni (quarterfinals)
2. (United States) Robert Galloway / (United States) Alex Lawson (first round)
3. (Philippines) Ruben Gonzales / (Tunisia) Skander Mansouri (first round)
4. (Australia) Rinky Hijikata / (Australia) Li Tu (quarterfinals)

== Draw ==
Key

- Q = Qualifier
- WC = Wild card
- LL = Lucky loser
- Alt = Alternate
- ITF = ITF entry
- PR = Protected ranking
- SR = Special ranking
- SE = Special exempt
- JE = Junior exempt
- JR = Junior Accelerator Programme entrant
- CO = College Accelerator Programme entrant
- NG = Next Gen Accelerator Program entrant
- w/o = Walkover
- r = Retired
- d = Defaulted

First round
1	(India) Y Bhambri (India) S Myneni	6	6
(Japan) S Shimabukuro (Japan) S Watanabe	4	4
WC	(South Korea) Jang Woo-hyeok (South Korea) Son Ji-hoon	3	4
PR	(Australia) M Polmans (Australia) M Purcell	6	6
3	(Philippines) R Gonzales (Tunisia) S Mansouri	2	3
(South Korea) Y-s Chung (United States) A Kovacevic	6	6
(United States) K Smith (Australia) A Vukic	3	2
(Czech Republic) M Gengel (Czech Republic) D Svrčina	6	6
(Germany) M Marterer (Austria) M Neuchrist	6	6
WC	(South Korea) Cho Se-hyuk (South Korea) Kim Jang-jun	2	3
(Belgium) K Coppejans (Belgium) J De Loore	5	2
4	(Australia) R Hijikata (Australia) L Tu	7	6
PR	(Japan) T Matsui (Japan) K Uesugi	7^{7}	0	[10]
(United States) C Eubanks (Poland) K Majchrzak	6^{4}	6	[7]
(Japan) K Uchida (Chinese Taipei) T-l Wu	6^{6}	7^{7}	[10]
2	(United States) R Galloway (United States) A Lawson	7^{8}	6^{4}	[8]

Quarterfinals
1	(India) Y Bhambri (India) S Myneni	4	7^{14}	[6]
PR	(Australia) M Polmans (Australia) M Purcell	6	6^{12}	[10]
(South Korea) Y-s Chung (United States) A Kovacevic	6	6
(Czech Republic) M Gengel (Czech Republic) D Svrčina	4	4
(Germany) M Marterer (Austria) M Neuchrist	7^{7}	4	[10]
4	(Australia) R Hijikata (Australia) L Tu	6^{4}	6	[3]
PR	(Japan) T Matsui (Japan) K Uesugi	4	6	[3]
(Japan) K Uchida (Chinese Taipei) T-l Wu	6	1	[10]

Semifinals
PR	(Australia) M Polmans (Australia) M Purcell
(South Korea) Y-s Chung (United States) A Kovacevic	w/o
(Germany) M Marterer (Austria) M Neuchrist	4	6	[7]
(Japan) K Uchida (Chinese Taipei) T-l Wu	6	2	[10]

Final
(South Korea) Y-s Chung (United States) A Kovacevic	7^{7}	5	[9]
(Japan) K Uchida (Chinese Taipei) T-l Wu	6^{2}	7	[11]
