= 2023 Seoul Open Challenger =

- Date: 24 – 30 April
- Edition: 7th
- Surface: Hard
- Location: Seoul, South Korea

Champions

Singles
- (China) Bu Yunchaokete

Doubles
- (Australia) Max Purcell / (Japan) Yasutaka Uchiyama
- Seoul Open Challenger

The 2023 Pleisure Seoul Open Challenger was a professional tennis tournament played on outdoor hard courts. It was the seventh edition of the tournament. It was part of the 2023 ATP Challenger Tour. It took place in Seoul, South Korea, between 24 and 30 April 2023.

== Singles main draw entrants ==
=== Seeds ===
Country	Player	Rank^{1}	Seed
AUS	Max Purcell	88	1
USA	Christopher Eubanks	90	2
AUS	Jordan Thompson	91	3
AUS	James Duckworth	113	4
ECU	Emilio Gómez	120	5
AUS	Rinky Hijikata	138	6
AUS	Aleksandar Vukic	140	7
USA	Denis Kudla	145	8

- ^{1} Rankings as of 17 April 2023.

=== Other entrants ===
The following players received wildcards into the singles main draw:

- (South Korea) Chung Hyeon
- (South Korea) Chung Yun-seong
- (South Korea) Lee Jea-moon

The following player received entry into the singles main draw using a protected ranking:

- (United States) Thai-Son Kwiatkowski

The following player received entry into the singles main draw as an alternate:

- Evgeny Donskoy

The following players received entry from the qualifying draw:

- (Germany) Peter Gojowczyk
- (Japan) Tatsuma Ito
- (South Korea) Lee Duck-hee
- (South Korea) Nam Ji-sung
- (India) Mukund Sasikumar
- (Japan) Yasutaka Uchiyama

== Champions ==
=== Singles ===
- (China) Bu Yunchaokete def. (Australia) Aleksandar Vukic 7–6^{(7–4)}, 6–4.

=== Doubles ===
- (Australia) Max Purcell / (Japan) Yasutaka Uchiyama def. (South Korea) Chung Yun-seong / (Japan) Yuta Shimizu 6–1, 6–4.
