= 2022 Keio Challenger =

- Date: 31 October – 6 November (men's); 7 – 13 November (women's)
- Edition: 15th (men's); 5th (women's)
- Category: ATP Challenger Tour; ITF Women's World Tennis Tour
- Surface: Hard
- Location: Yokohama, Japan

Champions

Men's singles
- (Australia) Christopher O'Connell

Women's singles
- (South Korea) Han Na-lae

Men's doubles
- (Romania) Victor Vlad Cornea / (Philippines) Ruben Gonzales

Women's doubles
- (Japan) Saki Imamura / (Japan) Naho Sato
← 2019 ·	Keio Challenger	· 2023 →

The 2022 Keio Challenger was a professional tennis tournament played on hard courts. It was the 15th (men's) and 5th (women's) editions of the tournament and part of the 2022 ATP Challenger Tour and the 2022 ITF Women's World Tennis Tour. It took place in Yokohama, Japan between 31 October and 13 November 2022.

== Men's singles main-draw entrants ==
=== Seeds ===
Country	Player	Rank^{1}	Seed
AUS	Christopher O'Connell	100	1
AUS	John Millman	142	2
JPN	Kaichi Uchida	168	3
BIH	Damir Džumhur	180	4
TPE	Wu Tung-lin	207	5
JPN	Hiroki Moriya	213	6
JPN	Yosuke Watanuki	223	7
CZE	Zdeněk Kolář	235	8

- ^{1} Rankings are as of 24 October 2022.

=== Other entrants ===
The following players received wildcards into the singles main draw:

- (Japan) Tomoya Fujiwara
- (Japan) Shinji Hazawa
- (Japan) Masamichi Imamura

The following players received entry into the singles main draw using protected rankings:

- (Japan) Tatsuma Ito
- (Japan) Yūichi Sugita

The following players received entry from the qualifying draw:

- (South Korea) Hong Seong-chan
- (Japan) Taisei Ichikawa
- (Japan) Yuki Mochizuki
- (Sweden) Jonathan Mridha
- (Japan) Ryota Tanuma
- (Japan) James Trotter

The following player received entry as a lucky loser:

- (Japan) Rimpei Kawakami

== Women's singles main-draw entrants ==
=== Seeds ===
Country	Player	Rank^{1}	Seed
KOR	Han Na-lae	185	1
~~JPN~~	~~Mai Hontama~~	~~260~~	~~2~~
JPN	Kyōka Okamura	304	3
JPN	Himeno Sakatsume	305	4
JPN	Sakura Hosogi	316	5
THA	Luksika Kumkhum	330	6
JPN	Haruka Kaji	337	7
JPN	Chihiro Muramatsu	348	8

- ^{1} Rankings are as of 31 October 2022.

=== Other entrants ===
The following players received wildcards into the singles main draw:

- (Japan) Anri Nagata
- (Japan) Remika Ohashi
- (Japan) Suzuho Oshino
- (Japan) Karen Tsutsumi

The following player received entry into the singles main draw using a protected ranking:

- (Japan) Ayano Shimizu

The following players received entry from the qualifying draw:

- (Japan) Erina Hayashi
- (Japan) Aoi Ito
- (Japan) Miyu Kato
- (Japan) Natsumi Kawaguchi
- (Japan) Honoka Kobayashi
- (Japan) Michika Ozeki
- (Japan) Himari Satō
- (Japan) Eri Shimizu

The following players received entry as a lucky loser:

- (Japan) Yuka Hosoki

== Champions ==
=== Men's singles ===
- (Australia) Christopher O'Connell def. (Japan) Yosuke Watanuki 6–1, 6–7^{(5–7)}, 6–3.

=== Women's singles ===
- (South Korea) Han Na-lae def. (Japan) Miyu Kato, 7–5, 6–0

=== Men's doubles ===
- (Romania) Victor Vlad Cornea / (Philippines) Ruben Gonzales def. (Japan) Tomoya Fujiwara / (Japan) Masamichi Imamura 7–5, 6–3.

=== Women's doubles ===
- (Japan) Saki Imamura / (Japan) Naho Sato def. (South Korea) Han Na-lae / (Japan) Mai Hontama, 6–4, 4–6, [10–5]
