= 2024 Keio Challenger – Men's singles =

Men's singles
- 2024 Keio Challenger

Final
- Champion: (Japan) Yuta Shimizu
- Runner-up: (Australia) Li Tu
- Score: 6–7^{(4–7)}, 6–4, 6–2

Events
Singles	men	women
Doubles	men	women
← 2023 ·	Keio Challenger	· 2025 →

Yosuke Watanuki was the defending champion but chose not to defend his title.

Yuta Shimizu won the title after defeating Li Tu 6–7^{(4–7)}, 6–4, 6–2 in the final.

== Seeds ==
1. (Italy) Mattia Bellucci (first round)
2. (Japan) Yasutaka Uchiyama (first round)
3. (Hong Kong) Coleman Wong (quarterfinals)
4. (Australia) Alex Bolt (first round)
5. (Japan) Sho Shimabukuro (first round)
6. (Australia) Li Tu (final)
7. (Austria) Jurij Rodionov (first round)
8. (France) Constant Lestienne (semifinals)

== Draw ==
=== Key ===
- Q = Qualifier
- WC = Wild card
- LL = Lucky loser
- Alt = Alternate
- ITF = ITF entry
- PR = Protected ranking
- SR = Special ranking
- SE = Special exempt
- JE = Junior exempt
- JR = Junior Accelerator Programme entrant
- CO = College Accelerator Programme entrant
- NG = Next Gen Accelerator Program entrant
- w/o = Walkover
- r = Retired
- d = Defaulted

=== Finals ===
Semifinals
8	(France) Constant Lestienne	2	6	6^{3}
6	(Australia) Li Tu	6	3	7^{7}
(Japan) Yuta Shimizu	6	6
(Lebanon) Benjamin Hassan	2	3

Final
6	(Australia) Li Tu	7^{7}	4	2
(Japan) Yuta Shimizu	6^{4}	6	6

=== Top half ===
First round
1	(Italy) M Bellucci	6	4	3
(Chinese Taipei) T-l Wu	4	6	6
A Zakharov	6	6
(Japan) R Noguchi	4	4
(Croatia) M Dodig	4	6	4
(Georgia (country)) N Basilashvili	6	2	6
Q	(Germany) C Negritu	6	5	4
8	(France) C Lestienne	3	7	6
3	(Hong Kong) C Wong	6	6
WC	(Japan) Lennon Roark Jones	2	1
Q	(South Korea) J-s Nam	2	2
(Japan) S Mochizuki	6	6
(Belgium) A Blockx	1^{r}
Q	(Australia) P Sekulic	5
Y Demin	1	0^{r}
6	(Australia) L Tu	6	3

Second round
(Chinese Taipei) T-l Wu	7^{9}	2	6^{6}
A Zakharov	6^{7}	6	7^{8}
(Georgia (country)) N Basilashvili	3	2^{r}
8	(France) C Lestienne	6	4
3	(Hong Kong) C Wong	7^{7}	6
(Japan) S Mochizuki	6^{2}	3
Q	(Australia) P Sekulic	6^{5}	3
6	(Australia) L Tu	7^{7}	6

Quarterfinals
A Zakharov	4	2
8	(France) C Lestienne	6	6
3	(Hong Kong) C Wong	0	4
6	(Australia) L Tu	6	6

Semifinals
8	(France) C Lestienne	2	6	6^{3}
6	(Australia) L Tu	6	3	7^{7}

=== Bottom half ===
First round
7	(Austria) J Rodionov	2	4
WC	(Japan) R Sakamoto	6	6
Q	(Italy) F Cinà	6	3	6
(Netherlands) G den Ouden	4	6	4
WC	(Japan) M Imamura	6	4	6
(Australia) D Sweeny	3	6	3
(Japan) Y Shimizu	7^{8}	6
4	(Australia) A Bolt	6^{6}	1
5	(Japan) S Shimabukuro	1	4
(Lebanon) B Hassan	6	6
(Czech Republic) D Svrčina	6	6
Q	(Switzerland) J Paul	3	4
Q	(Australia) O Jasika	3	7	4
(Australia) J McCabe	6	5	6
(Sweden) E Ymer	7^{7}	2	7^{7}
2	(Japan) Y Uchiyama	6^{1}	6	6^{5}

Second round
WC	(Japan) R Sakamoto	7	6
Q	(Italy) F Cinà	5	4
WC	(Japan) M Imamura	4	6^{4}
(Japan) Y Shimizu	6	7^{7}
(Lebanon) B Hassan	6	6
(Czech Republic) D Svrčina	4	1
(Australia) J McCabe	5	6	6
(Sweden) E Ymer	7	3	3

Quarterfinals
WC	(Japan) R Sakamoto	3	7^{7}	6^{3}
(Japan) Y Shimizu	6	6^{4}	7^{7}
(Lebanon) B Hassan	7^{7}	6^{8}	6
(Australia) J McCabe	6^{1}	7^{10}	2

Semifinals
(Japan) Y Shimizu	6	6
(Lebanon) B Hassan	2	3
