= 2023 Keio Challenger – Men's doubles =

Men's doubles
- 2023 Keio Challenger

Final
- Champions: (Sweden) Filip Bergevi (Netherlands) Mick Veldheer
- Runners-up: (Chinese Taipei) Ray Ho (Australia) Calum Puttergill
- Score: 2–6, 7–5, [11–9]

Events
Singles	men	women
Doubles	men	women
- Keio Challenger

Victor Vlad Cornea and Ruben Gonzales were the defending champions but only Gonzales chose to defend his title, partnering Chung Yun-seong. Gonzales lost in the semifinals to Ray Ho and Calum Puttergill.

Filip Bergevi and Mick Veldheer won the title after defeating Ho and Puttergill 2–6, 7–5, [11–9] in the final.

== Seeds ==
1. (United States) Evan King / (United States) Reese Stalder (quarterfinals)
2. (Australia) Andrew Harris / (South Korea) Nam Ji-sung (quarterfinals)
3. (Poland) Karol Drzewiecki / (Czech Republic) Zdeněk Kolář (quarterfinals)
4. (India) Rithvik Choudary Bollipalli / (India) Arjun Kadhe (first round)

== Draw ==
Key

- Q = Qualifier
- WC = Wild card
- LL = Lucky loser
- Alt = Alternate
- ITF = ITF entry
- PR = Protected ranking
- SR = Special ranking
- SE = Special exempt
- JE = Junior exempt
- JR = Junior Accelerator Programme entrant
- CO = College Accelerator Programme entrant
- NG = Next Gen Accelerator Program entrant
- w/o = Walkover
- r = Retired
- d = Defaulted

First round
1	(United States) E King (United States) R Stalder	6	6
(Northern Mariana Islands) C Sinclair (New Zealand) A Sitak	2	2
(Sweden) F Bergevi (Netherlands) M Veldheer	6	3	[10]
(Poland) P Matuszewski (Germany) K Wehnelt	3	6	[6]
4	(India) RC Bollipalli (India) A Kadhe	4	6^{3}
(Japan) T Matsui (Japan) K Uesugi	6	7^{7}
(Serbia) I Sabanov (Serbia) M Sabanov	4	2
(South Korea) S-c Hong (China) F Sun	6	6
WC	(Japan) Hibiki Arimoto (Japan) Yusaku Sugaya	5	3
(Chinese Taipei) R Ho (Australia) C Puttergill	7	6
(Chinese Taipei) Y-h Hsu (Japan) Y Shimizu	6	6^{7}	[5]
3	(Poland) K Drzewiecki (Czech Republic) Z Kolář	4	7^{9}	[10]
(South Korea) Y-s Chung (Philippines) R Gonzales	7	6
WC	(Japan) S Hazawa (Japan) M Imamura	5	2
(India) N Kaliyanda Poonacha (India) D Sharan	6^{5}	6	[9]
2	(Australia) A Harris (South Korea) J-s Nam	7^{7}	4	[11]

Quarterfinals
1	(United States) E King (United States) R Stalder	3	4
(Sweden) F Bergevi (Netherlands) M Veldheer	6	6
(Japan) T Matsui (Japan) K Uesugi	6	5	[10]
(South Korea) S-c Hong (China) F Sun	3	7	[3]
(Chinese Taipei) R Ho (Australia) C Puttergill	7	6
3	(Poland) K Drzewiecki (Czech Republic) Z Kolář	5	4
(South Korea) Y-s Chung (Philippines) R Gonzales	7^{9}	6
2	(Australia) A Harris (South Korea) J-s Nam	6^{7}	3

Semifinals
(Sweden) F Bergevi (Netherlands) M Veldheer	6	6
(Japan) T Matsui (Japan) K Uesugi	1	3
(Chinese Taipei) R Ho (Australia) C Puttergill	6	7^{7}
(South Korea) Y-s Chung (Philippines) R Gonzales	3	6^{5}

Final
(Sweden) F Bergevi (Netherlands) M Veldheer	2	7	[11]
(Chinese Taipei) R Ho (Australia) C Puttergill	6	5	[9]
