= 2026 Wuxi Open =

- Date: 4–10 May
- Edition: 3rd
- Surface: Hard
- Location: Wuxi, China

Champions

Singles
- (South Korea) Kwon Soon-woo

Doubles
- (Netherlands) Jean-Julien Rojer / (United States) Theodore Winegar
- Wuxi Open

The 2026 Wuxi Open was a professional tennis tournament played on hard courts. It was the third edition of the tournament which was part of the 2026 ATP Challenger Tour. It took place in Wuxi, China between 4 and 10 May 2026.

== Singles main-draw entrants ==
=== Seeds ===
Country	Player	Rank^{1}	Seed
AUS	Adam Walton	117	1
HKG	Coleman Wong	122	2
AUS	Dane Sweeny	134	3
AUS	Alex Bolt	147	4
CHN	Bu Yunchaokete	157	5
EST	Mark Lajal	164	6
AUS	Bernard Tomic	192	7
CAN	Alexis Galarneau	201	8

- ^{1} Rankings as of 20 April 2026.

=== Other entrants ===
The following players received wildcards into the singles main draw:

- (China) Cui Jie
- (China) Te Rigele
- (China) Zhang Tianhui

The following player received entry into the singles main draw using a protected ranking:

- (Chinese Taipei) Jason Jung

The following players received entry from the qualifying draw:

- (United States) Alafia Ayeni
- Petr Bar Biryukov
- (Switzerland) Luca Castelnuovo
- (United States) Andre Ilagan
- (Japan) Hayato Matsuoka
- (Serbia) Ognjen Milić

== Champions ==
=== Singles ===
- (South Korea) Kwon Soon-woo def. (China) Bu Yunchaokete 6–2, 7–6^{(7–2)}.

=== Doubles ===
- (Netherlands) Jean-Julien Rojer / (United States) Theodore Winegar def. (South Korea) Nam Ji-sung / (Finland) Patrik Niklas-Salminen 6–3, 7–6^{(8–6)}.
