= Bu Yunchaokete =

Chinese tennis player (born 2002)

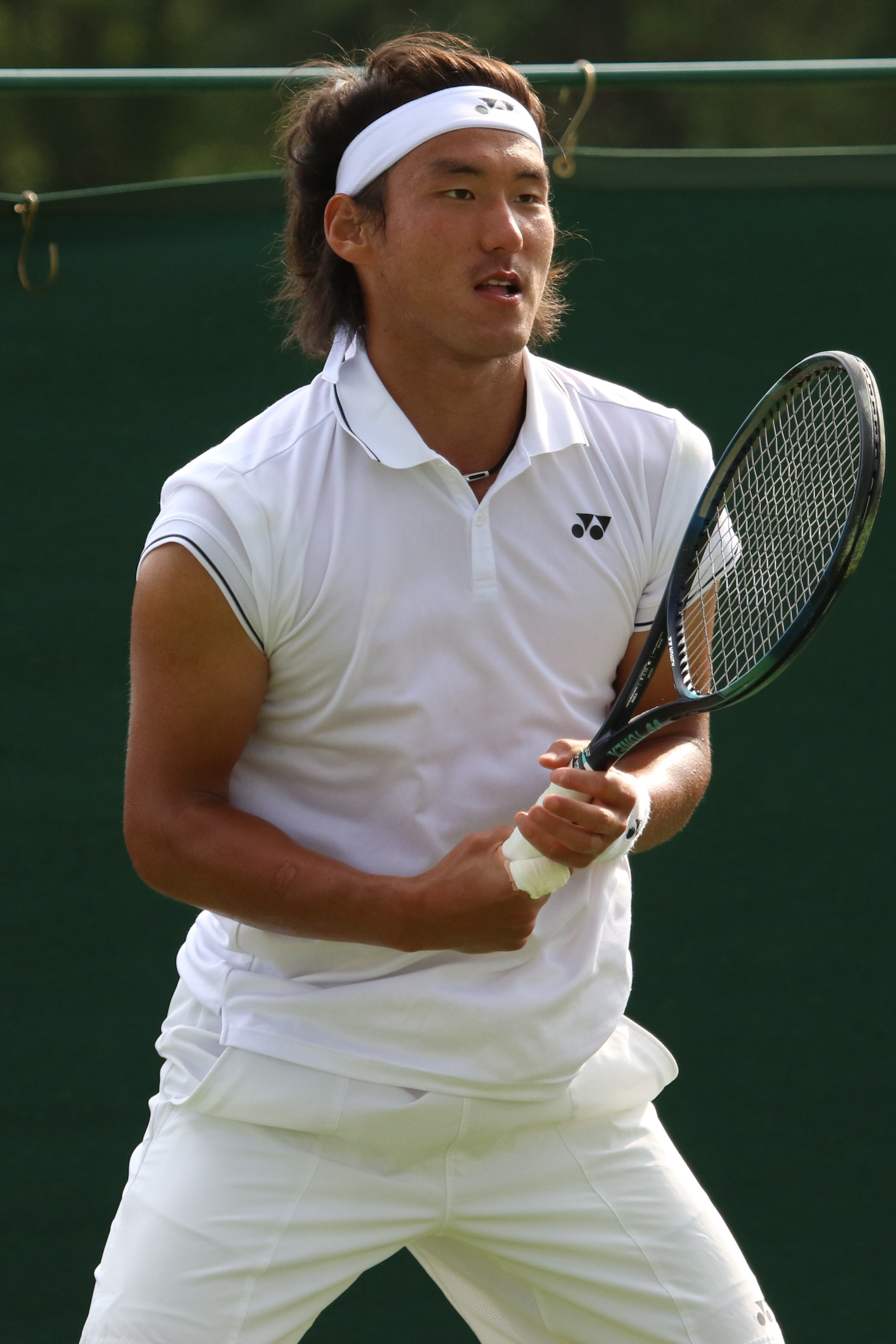
- Bu at the 2023 Wimbledon Championships
- Full name: Buyunchaokete
- ITF name: Yunchaokete Bu
- Country (sports): China
- Born: 19 January 2002 (age 24) Bortala Mongol Autonomous Prefecture, Xinjiang, China
- Height: 1.85 m (6 ft 1 in)
- Turned pro: January 2022
- Plays: Right-handed (two-handed backhand)
- Coach: Ricardo Ojeda Lara
- Prize money: US $1,956,485

Singles
- Career record: 23–37
- Career titles: 0
- Highest ranking: No. 64 (14 April 2025)
- Current ranking: No. 92 (9 November 2026)

Grand Slam singles results
- Australian Open: 1R (2025, 2026)
- French Open: 1R (2025)
- Wimbledon: 1R (2025)
- US Open: 2R (2026)

Doubles
- Career record: 3–11
- Career titles: 0
- Highest ranking: No. 274 (23 October 2023)
- Current ranking: No. 369 (22 June 2026)

Grand Slam doubles results
- Australian Open: 1R (2025)
- French Open: 1R (2025)
- Wimbledon: 1R (2025)
- Last updated on: 30 September 2026.

Buyunchaokete (Note: Chinese: 布云朝克特, Mongolian: ᠪ‍ᠤ‍ᠶᠠᠨᠴᠤᠭᠲᠤ, romanized: Buyanchogtu) (born 19 January 2002), known professionally as Bu Yunchaokete, is a Chinese professional tennis player. He has a career-high ATP singles ranking of world No. 64, achieved on 14 April 2025 and a doubles ranking of No. 274, achieved on 23 October 2023. He is currently the No. 1 player from China.

== Early life ==
Buyunchaokete was born in a Mongolian family from Bortala Mongol Autonomous Prefecture in northwestern Xinjiang. His father died when he was young, and his mother remarried. Following the Mongolian custom of attaching more importance to the paternal family, Buyunchaokete continued to live with his paternal grandparents after his father's death. His grandparents did not know Mandarin, and decided to send him to the SOS Children's Village in Ürümqi to allow him to receive a better education in the city. In 2007, he was discovered by tennis coach Luo Yong and sent to Huzhou, Zhejiang for training.

== Career ==
=== 2023: First Challenger title and Masters win ===
He won his maiden Challenger title at the 2023 Seoul Open, defeating Aleksandar Vukic in straight sets. As a result, he moved close to 80 positions up at a new career-high ranking of No. 164 on 8 May 2023.

He won his first match at a Masters 1000 level as a wildcard at the 2023 Rolex Shanghai Masters against Miomir Kecmanović.

=== 2024–2025: Historic semifinal, Major & Top 100 debuts ===
He won his second Challenger at the 2024 Wuxi Open in China, defeating Egor Gerasimov and becoming the youngest Chinese player to win multiple titles at this level. As a result he climbed 50 positions back up back to the top 200 at world No. 189 on 20 May 2024. Two months later, he reached the top 150 at No. 147 on 22 July 2024, following another Challenger title in Granby, Canada. He reached the top 125 following a semifinal showing at the 2024 Lincoln Challenger on 12 August 2024.

Ranked No. 123, he made his Grand Slam main-draw debut, after qualifying at the US Open, but was defeated in the first round by Casper Ruud.

At the 2024 Hangzhou Open, where he entered as a wildcard, he defeated Hugo Gaston and second seed Karen Khachanov to make his first ATP Tour quarterfinal, becoming just the sixth Chinese player to accomplish the feat in the Open Era. Next, he defeated Mikhail Kukushkin to reach the first ATP Tour semifinal in his career. Buyunchaokete played compatriot Zhang Zhizhen in a historic all-Chinese ATP semifinal but lost in straight sets. As a result, he moved into the Top 100 in the rankings for the first time, as world's No. 96 on 23 September 2024, becoming only the fourth Chinese player to reach this milestone. At the 2024 China Open, where he also received a wildcard, he defeated another compatriot Shang Juncheng in his first ATP 500-level win, and stunned sixth seed Lorenzo Musetti making his first ATP 500 quarterfinal, only the second Chinese man to reach that stage at such a tournament. He then upset fourth seed and world No. 6 Andrey Rublev for his first Top 10 win, and became the first Chinese man to reach the semifinals and the first to claim multiple Top 20 wins at a single event on hard court since the release of the ATP rankings in 1973. He lost to world No. 1 Jannik Sinner in straight sets. He received a wildcard for the 2024 Shanghai Masters for his debut at this tournament, which was later changed to a special exempt entry as he was still competing in Beijing.

=== 2026: Historic Grand Slam first win ===
By defeating 12th seed Rafael Jódar at the 2026 US Open, Buyunchaokete became the first lucky loser to defeat a Top 15 seed in the first round of the event in the Open Era; it was his first Grand Slam win.

== Davis Cup ==
He represents China at the Davis Cup, where he has a total W/L record of 2-5, 2-3 in singles and 0-2 in doubles.

== Name ==
According to the ATP Tour, his name is Buyunchaokete – one word – but he goes by Bu or his English name, Bert. His name on the websites of tennis' governing bodies, the ATP and the ITF Tours, is displayed as either Bu Yunchaokete or Yunchaokete Bu.

== Career statistics ==
=== Grand Slam performance timelines ===
Key
W	F	SF	QF	#R	RR	Q#	DNQ	A	NH

(W) winner; (F) finalist; (SF) semifinalist; (QF) quarterfinalist; (#R) rounds 4, 3, 2, 1; (RR) round-robin stage; (Q#) qualification round; (DNQ) did not qualify; (A) absent; (NH) not held; (SR) strike rate (events won / competed); (W–L) win–loss record.
To avoid confusion and double counting, these charts are updated at the conclusion of a tournament or when the player's participation has ended.

==== Singles ====
Current through the 2026 US Open.

Tournament	2023	2024	2025	2026	SR	W–L	Win%
Grand Slam tournaments
Australian Open	A	A	1R	1R	0 / 2	0–2	0%
French Open	A	A	1R	Q1	0 / 1	0–1	0%
Wimbledon	A	A	1R	Q2	0 / 1	0–1	0%
US Open	A	1R	1R	2R	0 / 3	1–3	25%
Win–loss	0–0	0–1	0–4	1–2	0 / 7	1–7	13%
ATP 1000 tournaments
Indian Wells Open	A	A	2R	A	0 / 1	1–1	50%
Miami Open	A	A	2R	Q2	0 / 1	1–1	50%
Monte-Carlo Masters	A	A	1R	A	0 / 1	0–1	0%
Madrid Open	A	A	1R	A	0 / 1	0-1	0%
Italian Open	A	A	1R	A	0 / 1	0–1	0%
Canadian Open	A	A	2R	A	0 / 1	1–1	50%
Cincinnati Open	A	A	1R	Q2	0 / 1	0–1	0%
Shanghai Masters	2R	1R	2R		0 / 3	2–3	40%
Paris Masters	A	Q2	A		0 / 0	0–0	–
Win–loss	1–1	0–1	4–8		0 / 10	5–10	–

== ATP Challenger Tour finals ==
=== Singles: 10 (5 titles, 5 runner-ups) ===
Finals by surface
Hard (3–4)
Clay (0–1)
Grass (2–0)

Result	W–L	Date	Tournament	Tier	Surface	Opponent	Score
Win	1–0	Apr 2023	Seoul Challenger, South Korea	Challenger	Hard	(Australia) Aleksandar Vukic	7–6^{(7–4)}, 6–4
Loss	1–1	Apr 2024	Gwangju Open, South Korea	Challenger	Hard	(South Africa) Lloyd Harris	2–6, 6–3, 4–6
Win	2–1	May 2024	Wuxi Open, China	Challenger	Hard	Egor Gerasimov	6–4, 6–1
Win	3–1	Jul 2024	Championnats de Granby, Canada	Challenger	Hard	(France) Térence Atmane	6–3, 6–7^{(7–9)}, 6–4
Loss	3–2	Jul 2024	Chicago Men's Challenger, US	Challenger	Hard	(Canada) Gabriel Diallo	3–6, 6–7^{(3–7)}
Loss	3–3	May 2025	Piemonte Open, Italy	Challenger	Clay	(Kazakhstan) Alexander Bublik	3–6, 3–6
Loss	3–4	Apr 2026	Busan Open, South Korea	Challenger	Hard	(Switzerland) Leandro Riedi	6–3, 3–6, 2–6
Loss	3–5	May 2026	Wuxi Open, China	Challenger	Hard	(South Korea) Kwon Soon-woo	2–6, 6–7,^{(2–7)}
Win	4–5	Jun 2026	Birmingham Open, UK	Challenger	Grass	(Finland) Otto Virtanen	2–6, 7–6^{(7–3)}, 6–3
Win	5–5	Jun 2026	Ilkley Open, UK	Challenger	Grass	(United Kingdom) Jacob Fearnley	6–3, 7–6^{(7–1)}

=== Doubles: 1 (1 runner-up) ===
Result	W–L	Date	Tournament	Tier	Surface	Partner	Opponents	Score
Loss	0–1	Sep 2023	Shanghai Challenger, China	Challenger	Hard	(China) Te Rigele	(Australia) Alex Bolt (Australia) Luke Saville	6–4, 3–6, [9–11]

== ITF World Tennis Tour finals ==
=== Singles: 8 (6 titles, 2 runner-ups) ===
Finals by surface
Hard (6–2)
Clay (0–0)

Result	W–L	Date	Tournament	Tier	Surface	Opponent	Score
Win	1–0	Apr 2022	M15 Monastir, Tunisia	WTT	Hard	(Italy) Mattia Bellucci	6–4, 6–2
Win	2–0	May 2022	M15 Monastir, Tunisia	WTT	Hard	(Chinese Taipei) Ray Ho	6–4, 7–5
Win	3–0	May 2022	M15 Monastir, Tunisia	WTT	Hard	(Spain) Alberto Barroso Campos	6–1, 6–7^{(4–7)}, 6–3
Win	4–0	Jun 2022	M25 Chiang Rai, Thailand	WTT	Hard	(Japan) Shintaro Imai	6–3, 7–5
Loss	4–1	Jun 2022	M15 Chiang Rai, Thailand	WTT	Hard	(Japan) Shintaro Imai	5–7, 4–6
Win	5–1	Jun 2022	M15 Chiang Rai, Thailand	WTT	Hard	(China) Cui Jie	6–1, 6–4
Win	6–1	Aug 2022	M25 Tbilisi, Georgia	WTT	Hard	(Israel) Edan Leshem	6–3, 2–6, 6–3
Loss	6–2	Dec 2022	M25 Monastir, Tunisia	WTT	Hard	(Estonia) Mark Lajal	4-6, 1-6

=== Doubles: 5 (1 title, 4 runner-ups) ===
Finals by surface
Hard (1–4)
Clay (0–0)

Result	W–L	Date	Tournament	Tier	Surface	Partner	Opponents	Score
Loss	0–1	Apr 2022	M15 Monastir, Tunisia	WTT	Hard	(China) Li Zhe	(United Kingdom) Charles Broom (Germany) Constantin Frantzen	5–7, 6–2, [8–10]
Loss	0–2	May 2022	M15 Monastir, Tunisia	WTT	Hard	(China) Wang Aoran	(Spain) Alberto Barroso Campos (Chinese Taipei) Ray Ho	2–6, 6–4, [5–10]
Win	1–2	May 2022	M15 Monastir, Tunisia	WTT	Hard	(China) Wang Aoran	(Japan) Kazuma Kawachi (Japan) Ryuki Matsuda	6–2, 7–6^{(7–2)}
Loss	1–3	Nov 2022	M25 Monastir, Tunisia	WTT	Hard	(Chinese Taipei) Ray Ho	(Italy) Luca Potenza (France) Arthur Bouquier	2–6, 2–6
Loss	1–4	Nov 2022	M25 Monastir, Tunisia	WTT	Hard	(Chinese Taipei) Ray Ho	(Austria) Neil Oberleitner (France) Arthur Bouquier	1–6, 4–6

== Wins over top-10 players ==
- Buyunchaokete has a 1–5 (16.67%) record against record against players who were, at the time the match was played, ranked in the top 10.

Season	2024	2025	Total
Wins	1	0	1

#	Player	Rank	Tournament	Surface	Rd	Score	BR
2024
1.	Andrey Rublev	6	China Open, China	Hard	QF	7–5, 6–4	96

- Key: (Rk) first use, opponent rank; (Rd) round; (Rk) 2nd use, player rank; (Ref) reference; (F) final; (SF) semifinal; (QF) quarterfinal; (#R) rounds 4, 3, 2, 1; (RR) round-robin stage; (Q#) qualifying rounds or stages (3), 2, 1.
