= Wuxi Open =

- 2026 Wuxi Open

ATP Challenger Tour
- Event name: Wuxi Open
- Location: Wuxi, China
- Category: ATP Challenger Tour 100
- Surface: Hard
- Prize money: $160,000
- Website: website

The Wuxi Open is a professional tennis tournament played on hard courts. It is currently part of the ATP Challenger Tour. It was first held in Wuxi, Jiangsu, China in 2024.

== Past finals ==
=== Singles ===
Year	Champion	Runner-up	Score
2026	(South Korea) Kwon Soon-woo	(China) Bu Yunchaokete	6–2, 7–6^{(7–2)}
2025	(China) Sun Fajing	(Australia) Alex Bolt	7–6^{(7–4)}, 6–4
2024	(China) Bu Yunchaokete	Egor Gerasimov	6–4, 6–1

=== Doubles ===
Year	Champions	Runners-up	Score
2026	(Netherlands) Jean-Julien Rojer (United States) Theodore Winegar	(South Korea) Nam Ji-sung (Finland) Patrik Niklas-Salminen	6–3, 7–6^{(8–6)}
2025	(United States) Vasil Kirkov (Netherlands) Bart Stevens	(Chinese Taipei) Ray Ho (Australia) Matthew Romios	3–6, 7–5, [10–6]
2024	(Australia) Calum Puttergill (United States) Reese Stalder	(Japan) Toshihide Matsui (Japan) Kaito Uesugi	7–6^{(10–8)}, 7–6^{(7–4)}
