= Calum Puttergill =

Australian tennis player (born 1993)

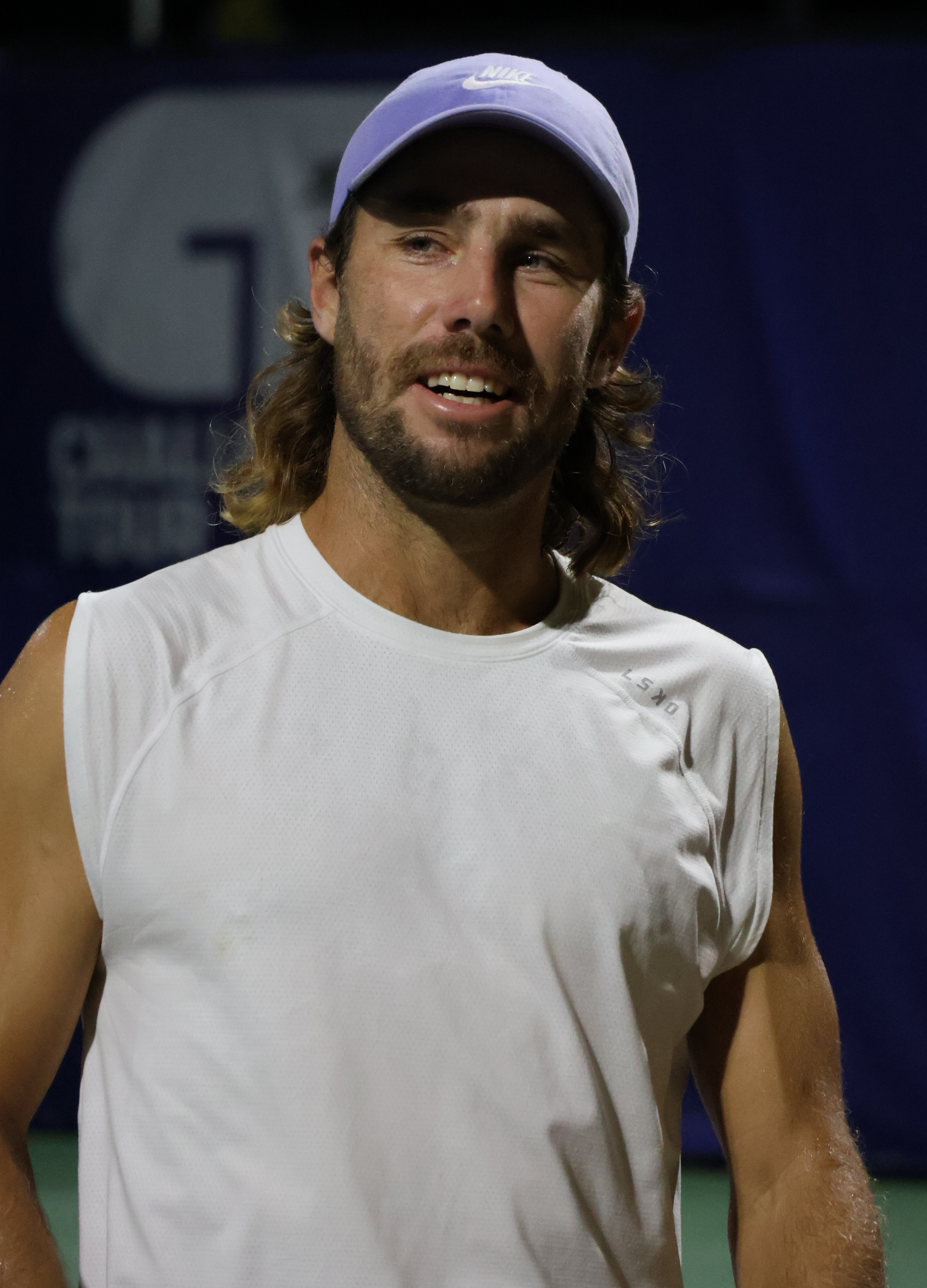
- Puttergill at the 2023 Cary Challenger II
- Country (sports): Australia
- Residence: Noosa Heads, Australia
- Born: 22 October 1993 (age 32) Mthatha, South Africa
- Height: 1.85 m (6 ft 1 in)
- Plays: Right-handed (two-handed backhand)
- Coach: Ryan Sevil
- Prize money: US$ 115,684

Singles
- Career record: 0–0
- Career titles: 0
- Highest ranking: No. 663 (24 February 2020)

Doubles
- Career record: 0–3
- Career titles: 0
- Highest ranking: No. 138 (28 October 2024)
- Current ranking: No. 335 (5 January 2026)
- Last updated on: 8 January 2026.

Calum Puttergill (born 22 October 1993) is a South African-born Australian professional tennis player who specializes in doubles. He has a career-high ATP doubles ranking of No. 138, achieved on 28 October 2024. He also reached a best singles ranking of No. 663 on 24 February 2020. He plays mostly on ATP Challenger Tour.

Puttergill made his ATP main draw debut at the 2021 Great Ocean Road Open in the doubles draw partnering Scott Puodziunas.

== ATP Challenger Tour finals ==
=== Doubles: 10 (2 titles, 8 runner-ups) ===
Legend ATP Challenger Tour (2–8)	Finals by surface Hard (2–8) Clay (–)

Result	W–L	Date	Tournament	Tier	Surface	Partner	Opponents	Score
Win	1–0	Oct 2022	Playford Tennis International, Australia	Challenger	Hard	(Australia) Jeremy Beale	(Japan) Rio Noguchi (Japan) Yusuke Takahashi	7–6^{(7–2)}, 6–4
Loss	1–1	Jul 2023	Cranbrook Tennis Classic, US	Challenger	Hard	(Australia) Blake Ellis	(Australia) Tristan Schoolkate (Australia) Adam Walton	5–7, 3–6
Loss	1–2	Nov 2023	Keio Challenger, Japan	Challenger	Hard	(Chinese Taipei) Ray Ho	(Sweden) Filip Bergevi (Netherlands) Mick Veldheer	6–2, 5–7, [9–11]
Loss	1–3	Jan 2024	Open Nouvelle-Calédonie, New Caledonia	Challenger	Hard	(Japan) Toshihide Matsui	(Northern Mariana Islands) Colin Sinclair (New Zealand) Rubin Statham	5–7, 2–6
Win	2–3	May 2024	Wuxi Open, China	Challenger	Hard	(United States) Reese Stalder	(Japan) Toshihide Matsui (Japan) Kaito Uesugi	7–6^{(10–8)}, 7–6^{(7–4)}
Loss	2–4	Sep 2024	LTP Men's Open, US	Challenger	Hard	(Australia) Dane Sweeny	(Australia) Luke Saville (Australia) Tristan Schoolkate	7–6^{(7–1)}, 1–6, [3–10]
Loss	2–5	Nov 2024	Keio Challenger, Japan	Challenger	Hard	(Australia) Blake Bayldon	(Lebanon) Benjamin Hassan (India) Saketh Myneni	2–6, 4–6
Loss	2–6	Nov 2025	NSW Open, Australia	Challenger	Hard	(Australia) Dane Sweeny	(Australia) Rinky Hijikata (Australia) Marc Polmans	0–6, 4–6
Loss	2–7	Jan 2026	BNC Tennis Open, New Caledonia	Challenger	Hard	(Australia) Jake Delaney	(Japan) Yusuke Kusuhara (Japan) Shunsuke Nakagawa	5–7, 3–6
Loss	2–8	Feb 2026	Cleveland Open, United States	Challenger	Hard (i)	(United States) George Goldhoff	(United States) Cannon Kingsley (Antigua and Barbuda) Jody Maginley	3–6, 4–6

== ITF Tour finals ==
=== Singles: 1 (runner-up) ===
Legend ITF WTT (0–1)

Result	W–L	Date	Tournament	Tier	Surface	Opponent	Score
Loss	0–1	Sep 2019	M25 Darwin, Australia	WTT	Hard	(Australia) Blake Mott	1–6, 4–6

=== Doubles: 19 (10 titles, 9 runner-ups) ===
Legend ITF Futures/WTT (10–9)	Finals by surface Hard (7–9) Clay (2–0) Grass (1–0)

Result	W–L	Date	Tournament	Tier	Surface	Partner	Opponents	Score
Loss	0–1	Sep 2016	Australia F5, Alice Springs	Futures	Hard	(Australia) Thomas Fancutt	(Australia) Luke Saville (Australia) Marc Polmans	1–6, 2–6
Loss	0–2	Sep 2018	Australia F5, Cairns	Futures	Hard	(Australia) Jacob Grills	(United States) Dusty H.Boyer (United Kingdom) Evan Hoyt	2–6, 5–7
Win	1–2	Mar 2019	M25 Mildura, Australia	WTT	Grass	(Australia) Brandon Walkin	(Australia) Scott Puodziunas (United Kingdom) Evan Hoyt	7–6^{(7–4)}, 6–7^{(3–7)}, [18–16]
Win	2–2	Mar 2019	M15 Mornington, Australia	WTT	Clay	(Australia) Brandon Walkin	(Australia) Dane Sweeny (Australia) Thomas Fancutt	6–1, 7–5
Win	3–2	Mar 2019	M15 Mornington, Australia	WTT	Clay	(Australia) Brandon Walkin	(Australia) Aaron Addison (India) Karunuday Singh	1–6, 6–3, [10–8]
Loss	3–3	Jun 2019	M15 Heraklion, Greece	WTT	Hard	(Australia) Thomas Fancutt	(Spain) Andrés Artuñedo (Spain) Pablo Vivero González	2–6, 2–6
Win	4–3	Sep 2019	M25 Cairns, Australia	WTT	Hard	(Australia) Brandon Walkin	(New Zealand) Rhett Purcell (Ukraine) Vladyslav Orlov	6–4, 5–7, [10–5]
Loss	4–4	Jan 2021	M15 Te Anau, New Zealand	WTT	Hard	(New Zealand) Rhett Purcell	(Switzerland) Luca Margaroli (Italy) Andrea Vavassori	5–7, 7–6^{(7–2)}, [8–10]
Loss	4–5	Feb 2022	M25 Canberra, Australia	WTT	Hard	(Japan) Naoki Tajima	(Australia) Akira Santillan (New Zealand) Rubin Statham	4-6, 3-6
Win	5–5	Feb 2022	M25 Bendigo, Australia	WTT	Hard	(Australia) Brandon Walkin	(Australia) Blake Ellis (Australia) Tristan Schoolkate	6–2, 6–3
Win	6–5	May 2022	M25 Netanya, Israel	WTT	Hard	(Australia) Aaron Addison	(United Kingdom) Giles Hussey (United Kingdom) Daniel Little	6–3, 3–6, [10–7]
Win	7–5	Sep 2022	M25 Darwin, Australia	WTT	Hard	(Australia) Dane Sweeny	(Australia) Joshua Charlton (Australia) Adam Walton	7–6^{(7–5)}, 6–3
Loss	7–6	Oct 2022	M25 Cairns, Australia	WTT	Hard	(Australia) Aaron Addison	(Australia) Tristan Schoolkate (Australia) Blake Ellis	4–6, 1–6
Loss	7–7	Nov 2022	M25 Traralgon, Australia	WTT	Hard	(Australia) Matthew Romios	(Australia) James Frawley (Australia) Jeremy Beale	3–6, 2–6
Loss	7–8	Feb 2023	M25 Burnie, Australia	WTT	Hard	(Australia) Adam Walton	(Australia) Tristan Schoolkate (Australia) Luke Saville	5–7, 4–6
Win	8–8	Apr 2023	M25 Sharm El Sheikh, Egypt	WTT	Hard	(France) Robin Bertrand	(Egypt) Akram El Sallaly (Egypt) Mohamed Safwat	6–4, 6–1
Win	9–8	Sep 2025	M25 Tamworth, Australia	WTT	Hard	(Australia) Joshua Charlton	(Australia) Jesse Delaney (Australia) Jake Delaney	6–1, 6–7^{(5–7)}, [11–9]
Win	10–8	Sep 2025	M25 Perth, Australia	WTT	Hard	(Australia) Dane Sweeny	(Australia) Chen Dong (Poland) Filip Peliwo	6–4, 6–7^{(6–8)}, [10–1]
Loss	10–9	Dec 2025	M15 Hamilton, New Zealand	WTT	Hard	(United States) Keegan Smith	(Australia) Daniel Jovanovski (Australia) Tai Sach	6–7^{(8–10)}, 4–6
