= Chung Yun-seong =

South Korean tennis player

Chung Yun-seong 정윤성
- Residence: Yongin, South Korea
- Born: 27 March 1998 (age 28) Seoul, South Korea
- Height: 1.78 m (5 ft 10 in)
- Turned pro: 2017
- Plays: Right-handed (two handed-backhand)
- Coach: Jean-Luc Fontanot
- Prize money: US $260,971

Singles
- Career record: 0–3
- Career titles: 0
- Highest ranking: No. 233 (22 July 2019)
- Current ranking: No. 945 (14 September 2026)

Grand Slam singles results
- US Open: Q1 (2019)

Doubles
- Career record: 2–2
- Career titles: 0
- Highest ranking: No. 129 (22 May 2023)
- Current ranking: No. 719 (14 September 2026)
- Last updated on: 16 September 2026.

- Chung Yun-seong
- Hangul: 정윤성
- RR: Jeong Yunseong
- MR: Chŏng Yunsŏng

Chung Yun-seong (Korean: 정윤성; born 27 March 1998) is a South Korean tennis player. He has a career high ATP singles ranking of No. 233 achieved on 22 July 2019 and a career high ATP doubles ranking of No. 129 achieved on 22 May 2023. Chung has won three doubles ATP Challenger titles as well as four ITF singles and five doubles titles.

On the junior tour, Chung had a career-high combined ranking of 3 achieved on 21 March 2016. Chung was a semifinalist at the 2016 Australian Open boys' singles event and the 2015 US Open boys' singles event where he fell to both eventual champions Oliver Anderson and Taylor Fritz, respectively. Chung was also a singles finalist at the Osaka Mayor's Cup in 2014.

He and Orlando Luz lost to Yishai Oliel of Israel and Patrik Rikl of the Czech Republic in the final of the 2016 French Open boys' doubles, 6–3, 6–4.

== Performance timeline ==
Key
W	F	SF	QF	#R	RR	Q#	DNQ	A	NH

(W) winner; (F) finalist; (SF) semifinalist; (QF) quarterfinalist; (#R) rounds 4, 3, 2, 1; (RR) round-robin stage; (Q#) qualification round; (DNQ) did not qualify; (A) absent; (NH) not held; (SR) strike rate (events won / competed); (W–L) win–loss record.

=== Singles ===
Tournament	2019	W–L	Win %
Grand Slam tournaments
Australian Open		0–0	–
French Open		0–0	–
Wimbledon		0–0	–
US Open	Q1	0–0	–
Win–loss		0–0	–

== Junior Grand Slam finals ==
=== Doubles: 1 (1 runner-up) ===
Outcome	Year	Championship	Surface	Partner	Opponent	Score
Runner-up	2016	French Open	Clay	(Brazil) Orlando Luz	(Israel) Yishai Oliel (Czech Republic) Patrik Rikl	3–6, 4–6

== ATP Challenger and ITF Futures/World Tennis Tour finals ==
=== Singles: 8 (4–4) ===
Legend ATP Challenger (0–0) ITF Futures (4–4)	Finals by surface Hard (4–4) Clay (0–0)

Result	W–L	Date	Tournament	Tier	Surface	Opponent	Score
Loss	0–1	Jun 2014	Korea F6, Gimcheon	Futures	Hard	(South Korea) Kim Cheong-Eui	2–6, 4–6
Loss	0–2	Aug 2015	Korea F3, Gimcheon	Futures	Hard	(South Korea) Jung-Woong Na	3–6, 1–6
Loss	0–3	May 2016	China F7, Wuhan	Futures	Hard	(Japan) Akira Santillan	1–6, 4–6
Win	1–3	Jun 2018	Korea F2, Gyeongsan	Futures	Hard	(South Korea) Nam Ji-sung	6–4, 6–3
Win	2–3	Jun 2018	Korea F3, Daegu	Futures	Hard	(South Korea) Nam Ji-sung	6–1, 6–3
Win	3–3	May 2021	M15 Monastir, Tunisia	World Tennis Tour	Hard	(Tunisia) Aziz Dougaz	6–1, 7–5
Win	4–3	May 2021	M15 Monastir, Tunisia	World Tennis Tour	Hard	(Australia) Jeremy Beale	6–4, 6–2
Loss	4–4	Jan 2022	M25 Monastir, Tunisia	World Tennis Tour	Hard	(France) Harold Mayot	4–6, 6–0, 4–6

=== Doubles: 25 (14 titles, 11 runner-ups) ===
Legend ATP Challenger (3–5) ITF Futures (11–6)	Finals by surface Hard (13–9) Clay (1–2)

Result	W–L	Date	Tournament	Tier	Surface	Partner	Opponents	Score
Loss	0–1	Aug 2015	Astana, Kazakhstan	Challenger	Hard	(Uzbekistan) Jurabek Karimov	(Russia) Konstantin Kravchuk (Ukraine) Denys Molchanov	2–6, 2–6
Win	1–1	Mar 2016	Japan F2, Tokyo	Futures	Hard	(South Korea) Soonwoo Kwon	(Japan) Issei Okamura (Japan) Kento Takeuchi	2–6, 6–2, [10–3]
Loss	1–2	Jun 2016	Korea F2, Sangju	Futures	Hard	(South Korea) Lim Yong-kyu	(South Korea) Nam Ji-sung (South Korea) Song Min-kyu	4–6, 4–6
Loss	1–3	Aug 2016	Thailand F1, Hua Hin	Futures	Hard	(China) Xin Gao	(Chinese Taipei) Chen Ti (United States) John Paul Fruttero	2–6, 2–6
Win	2–3	Oct 2016	Chinese Taipei F2, Kaohsiung	Futures	Hard	(Finland) Patrik Niklas-Salminen	(Chinese Taipei) Yu Hsiang Chiu (Chinese Taipei) Shao-Fan Liu	7–5, 6–4
Win	3–3	Dec 2016	Indonesia F4, Jakarta	Futures	Hard	(Japan) Shintaro Imai	(Belgium) Julien Cagnina (France) Enzo Couacaud	6–2, 6–4
Win	4–3	Dec 2016	Indonesia F5, Jakarta	Futures	Hard	(Japan) Shintaro Imai	(Japan) Issei Okamura (Japan) Kento Takeuchi	6–2, 3–6, [10–6]
Win	5–3	Feb 2018	Spain F3, Mallorca	Futures	Clay	(Japan) Rio Noguchi	(Brazil) Bruno Sant'Anna (Spain) David Vega Hernández	2–6, 7–6^{(8–6)}, [10–8]
Win	6–3	Jun 2018	Korea F3, Daegu	Futures	Hard	(South Korea) Seong Chan Hong	(South Korea) Soonwoo Kwon (South Korea) Lim Yong-kyu	walkover
Loss	6–4	Jul 2019	Astana, Kazakhstan	Challenger	Hard	(South Korea) Nam Ji-sung	(Kazakhstan) Andrey Golubev (Kazakhstan) Aleksandr Nedovyesov	4–6, 4–6
Loss	6–5	Feb 2020	M25 Nonthaburi, Thailand	World Tennis Tour	Hard	(France) Corentin Denolly	(Thailand) Sonchat Ratiwatana (Thailand) Sanchai Ratiwatana	6–3, 4–6, [5–10]
Win	7–5	Feb 2020	M25 Aktobe, Kazakhstan	World Tennis Tour	Hard	(Bosnia and Herzegovina) Aldin Šetkić	(Italy) Riccardo Balzerani (Italy) Francesco Forti	6–3, 6–4
Loss	7–6	Feb 2021	M15 Antalya, Turkey	World Tennis Tour	Clay	(Ukraine) Oleksandr Ovcharenko	(Netherlands) Max Houkes (Netherlands) Sidane Pontjodikromo	5–7, 1–6
Win	8–6	May 2021	M15 Monastir, Tunisia	World Tennis Tour	Hard	(Japan) Shintaro Imai	(Sweden) Filip Bergevi (Sweden) Jonathan Mridha	6–2, 7–6^{(7–4)}
Win	9–6	May 2021	M15 Monastir, Tunisia	World Tennis Tour	Hard	(Japan) Shintaro Imai	(Tunisia) Aziz Dougaz (Zimbabwe) Benjamin Lock	6–3, 6–2
Loss	9–7	Jul 2021	M25 Champaign, United States	World Tennis Tour	Hard	(Japan) Rio Noguchi	(United States) Ben Shelton (United States) Eliot Spizzirri	4–6, 0–6
Win	10–7	Jun 2022	Orlando, USA	Challenger	Hard	(Greece) Michail Pervolarakis	(Tunisia) Malek Jaziri (Japan) Kaichi Uchida	6–7^{(5–7)}, 7–6^{(7–3)}, [16–14]
Win	11–7	Sep 2022	Nonthaburi, Thailand	Challenger	Hard	(New Zealand) Ajeet Rai	(Philippines) Francis Casey Alcantara (Indonesia) Christopher Rungkat	6–1, 7–6^{(8–6)}
Loss	11–8	Oct 2022	Seoul, South Korea	Challenger	Hard	(United States) Aleksandar Kovacevic	(Japan) Kaichi Uchida (Chinese Taipei) Wu Tung-lin	7–6^{(7–2)}, 5–7, [9–11]
Loss	11–9	Jan 2023	Tigre, Argentina	Challenger	Clay	(United States) Christian Langmo	(Brazil) Daniel Dutra da Silva (Ukraine) Oleg Prihodko	2–6, 2–6
Win	12–9	Feb 2023	Bangalore, India	Challenger	Hard	(Chinese Taipei) Hsu Yu-hsiou	(India) Anirudh Chandrasekar (India) Vijay Sundar Prashanth	3–6, 7–6^{(9–7)}, [11–9]
Loss	12–10	Apr 2023	M25 Kashiwa, Japan	World Tennis Tour	Hard	(Japan) Shintaro Imai	(Chinese Taipei) Hsu Yu-hsiou (Chinese Taipei) Huang Tsung-hao	6–7^{(5–7)}, 6–2, [10–12]
Win	13–10	Apr 2023	M25 Jakarta, Indonesia	World Tennis Tour	Hard	(South Korea) Jeong Yeong-Seok	(Japan) Makoto Ochi (Japan) Yuta Shimizu	4–6, 7–6^{(7–1)}, [10–8]
Loss	13–11	Apr 2023	Seoul, South Korea	Challenger	Hard	(Japan) Yuta Shimizu	(Australia) Max Purcell (Japan) Yasutaka Uchiyama	1–6, 4–6
Win	14–11	Jun 2023	M25 Anseong, South Korea	World Tennis Tour	Hard	(Japan) Takeru Yuzuki	(Japan) Shunsuke Mitsui (Japan) Naoki Tajima	7–6^{(7–3)}, 6–4
