= Li Tu =

Australian tennis player (born 1996)

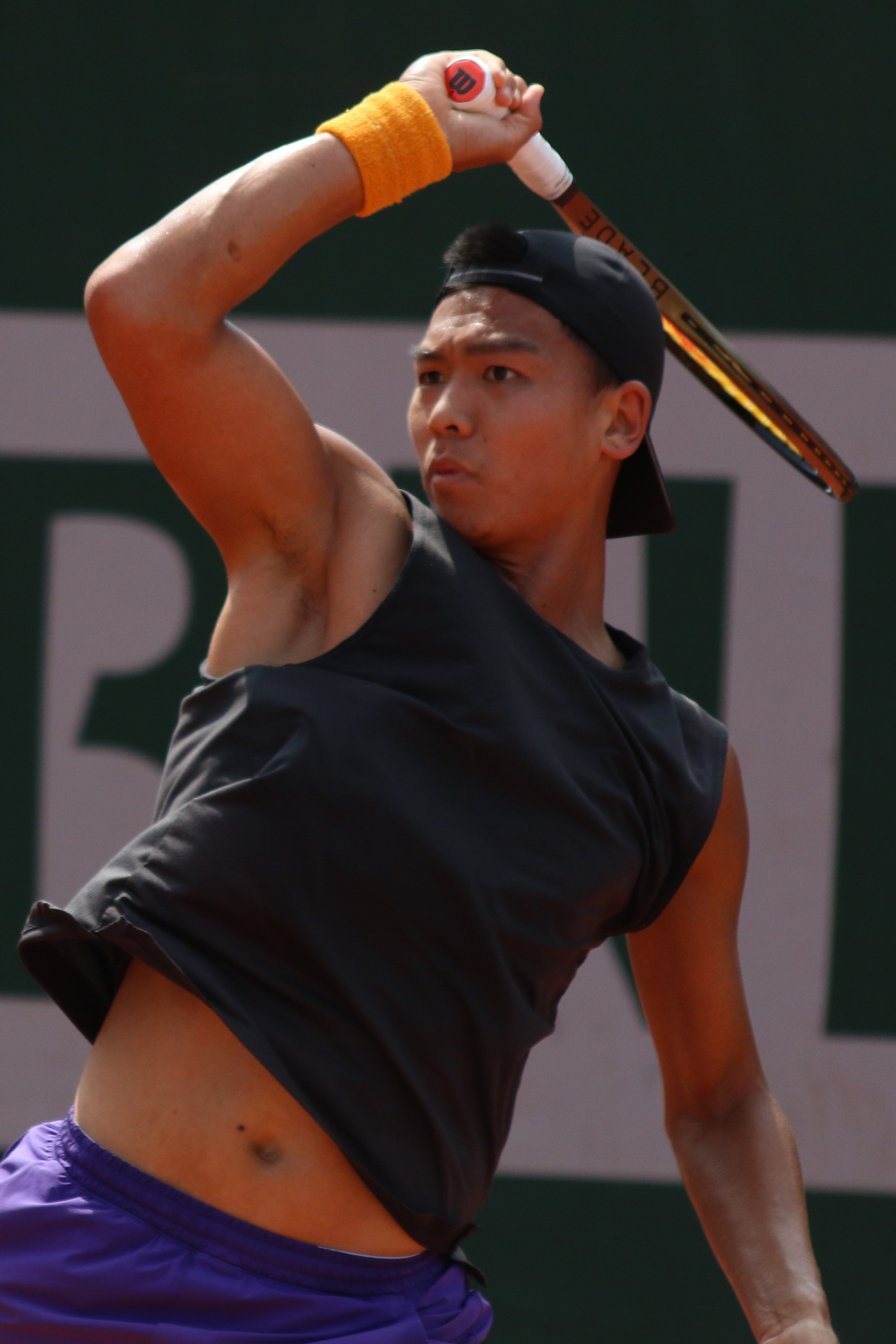
- Tu at the 2023 French Open
- Country (sports): Australia
- Residence: Adelaide, Australia
- Born: 27 May 1996 (age 30) Adelaide, Australia
- Height: 1.83m (6ft)
- Turned pro: 2021
- Plays: Right-handed (one-handed backhand)
- Coach: David Macpherson
- Prize money: US$ 908,752

Singles
- Career record: 2–12
- Career titles: 0
- Highest ranking: No. 160 (14 July 2025)
- Current ranking: No. 367 (8 June 2026)

Grand Slam singles results
- Australian Open: 1R (2021, 2025)
- French Open: Q2 (2024)
- Wimbledon: Q3 (2025)
- US Open: 1R (2024)

Doubles
- Career record: 4–4
- Career titles: 0
- Highest ranking: No. 189 (27 January 2025)
- Current ranking: No. 328 (24 November 2025)

Grand Slam doubles results
- Australian Open: 3R (2022, 2025, 2026)
- Last updated on: 4 June 2026.

Li Tu (born 27 May 1996) is an Australian professional tennis player. He has a career-high ATP singles ranking of No. 160, achieved on 14 July 2025 and a best doubles ranking of No. 189, achieved on 27 January 2025.

== Career ==
=== 2011–2014: Pro debut and retirement ===
Tu made his ITF Futures debut in February 2011 at the Australia F2. He played four other tournaments, losing in the first round in all of them.

Tu competed in the 2012 Junior Davis Cup alongside Thanasi Kokkinakis, later working as a tennis coach prior to his debut on the senior tour.

In February 2014, he won his first match on ITF-level. In April 2014, Tu reached the quarterfinal of the Australia F5, his best result this level, but retired in June 2014.

=== 2020–2021: Return, ATP and major debut, four ITF titles ===
In 2020, Tu was inspired to return to playing tennis and enjoyed success on the Australian UTR Pro Tennis Series.

Tu made his ATP Tour debut at the 2021 Murray River Open from where he received a wildcard into the singles main draw. Tu also made his Grand Slam debut at the 2021 Australian Open, after receiving a wildcard. He lost in the first round to Feliciano López.

In August 2021, Tu won his first ITF title as an unranked qualifier at a M15 tournament in Tunisia. He was competing in his first international event since June 2014. In September 2021, Tu won the singles and doubles titles at a tournament in Monastir, Tunisia.

Tu ended the 2021 season with an ATP ranking of No. 521.

=== 2022: Maiden Challenger title, top 200 ===
Tu lost in the first round of the 2022 Australian Open – Men's singles qualifying. He made his Grand Slam tournament debut in doubles and reached the third round, after receiving a wildcard with Dane Sweeny.

In May, he scooped an ITF title in Cairo and finished runner-up at another ITF event at Monastir, winning 11 of his past 12 matches. He raised 55 places to a new career-high of world No. 342 on 9 May 2022.

In July, Tu made his debut on the ATP Challenger Tour in Rome, Georgia, where he lost to Yasutaka Uchiyama. The following week in Indianapolis, as an alternate, he won his first Challenger match against Michail Pervolarakis, but lost to Dominik Koepfer in the second round. He then made his first Challenger quarterfinal in Winnipeg, defeating seventh seed Gijs Brouwer in the second round, before losing to Enzo Couacaud. As a result, he reached world No. 252 on 1 August 2022.

In October, Tu made his first Challenger semifinal in Seoul, after qualifying by beating Cho Se-hyuk and Mukund Sasikumar. In the main draw, he beat Kaichi Uchida, fellow qualifier Naoki Nakagawa and the fifth seed, compatriot Christopher O'Connell. He defeated the sixth seed, compatriot James Duckworth, in the semifinals to reach his first Challenger final where he defeated Wu Yibing in straight sets. As a result, he moved more than 100 positions up in the rankings, at world No. 190 on 17 October 2022.

=== 2023: First ATP Tour win ===
In Newport, after qualifying for the main draw, Tu won his first match at ATP Tour level by beating Aleksandar Vukic in straight sets. This was also his first match win against a top 100 player.

He entered the Mallorca Championships, also as qualifier, but lost his first-round match against lucky loser Pavel Kotov.

He also entered the main draw at the Chengdu Open as a lucky loser and lost in the first round to Arthur Rinderknech.

=== 2024: Masters and US Open debuts ===
He qualified for his home tournament, the Brisbane International.

He again qualified for the Hall of Fame Open, losing to Eliot Spizzirri in the first round. He also qualified for the main draw of the US Open making his debut at this major. In the first round, he lost to third seed Carlos Alcaraz in four sets.

=== 2025: Adelaide and Australian wildcards ===
As a wildcard entrant, Tu defeated James Duckworth to reach the second round at the Adelaide International, where he lost to Benjamin Bonzi. Again given entry to the main draw as a wildcard at the Australian Open, he lost to 24th seed Jiří Lehečka in the first round.

== Performance timelines ==
Key
W	F	SF	QF	#R	RR	Q#	P#	DNQ	A	Z#	PO	G	S	B	NMS	NTI	P	NH

(W) winner; (F) finalist; (SF) semifinalist; (QF) quarterfinalist; (#R) rounds 4, 3, 2, 1; (RR) round-robin stage; (Q#) qualification round; (P#) preliminary round; (DNQ) did not qualify; (A) absent; (Z#) Davis/Fed Cup Zonal Group (with number indication) or (PO) play-off; (G) gold, (S) silver or (B) bronze Olympic/Paralympic medal; (NMS) not a Masters tournament; (NTI) not a Tier I tournament; (P) postponed; (NH) not held; (SR) strike rate (events won / competed); (W–L) win–loss record.
To avoid confusion and double counting, these charts are updated at the conclusion of a tournament or when the player's participation has ended.

=== Singles ===
Tournament	2021	2022	2023	2024	2025	2026	SR	W–L	Win %
Grand Slam tournaments
Australian Open	1R	Q1	Q2	Q1	1R	Q1	0 / 2	0–2	0%
French Open	A	A	Q1	Q2	Q1	A	0 / 0	0–0	–
Wimbledon	A	A	A	Q2	Q3	A	0 / 0	0–0	–
US Open	A	A	A	1R	A		0 / 1	0–1	0%
Win–loss	0–1	0–0	0–0	0–1	0–1	0–0	0 / 3	0–3	0%
ATP Masters 1000
Indian Wells Masters	A	A	A	A	1R		0 / 1	0–1	0%
Miami Open	A	A	A	A	A		0 / 0	0–0	–
Monte Carlo Masters	A	A	A	A	A		0 / 0	0–0	–
Madrid Open	A	A	A	A	A		0 / 0	0-0	–
Italian Open	A	A	A	A	A		0 / 0	0–0	–
Canadian Open	A	A	A	A	Q1		0 / 0	0–0	–
Cincinnati Masters	A	A	A	A	Q2		0 / 0	0–0	–
Shanghai Masters	NH		Q2	1R	A		0 / 1	0–1	0%
Paris Masters	A	A	A	A	A		0 / 0	0–0	–
Win–loss	0–0	0–0	0–0	0–1	0–1	0–0	0 / 2	0–2	0%

== Personal life ==
Tu was born in Adelaide to Chinese immigrant parents. His mother, Yu Ping Zheng, died in 2022.

== ATP Challenger Tour finals ==
=== Singles: 4 (1 title, 3 runner-ups) ===
Legend ATP Challenger Tour (1–3)

Result	W–L	Date	Tournament	Tier	Surface	Opponent	Score
Win	1–0	Oct 2022	Seoul Challenger, South Korea	Challenger	Hard	(China) Wu Yibing	7–6^{(7–5)}, 6–4
Loss	1–1	Jul 2024	Lexington Challenger, US	Challenger	Hard	(Brazil) João Fonseca	1–6, 4–6
Loss	1–2	Nov 2024	Keio Challenger, Japan	Challenger	Hard	(Japan) Yuta Shimizu	7–6^{(7–4)}, 4–6, 2–6
Loss	1–3	Apr 2026	Wuning Challenger II, China	Challenger	Hard	(China) Sun Fajing	7–5, 4–6, 5–7

=== Doubles: 3 (3 titles) ===
Legend ATP Challenger Tour (3–0)

Result	W–L	Date	Tournament	Tier	Surface	Partner	Opponents	Score
Win	1–0	Jul 2024	Chicago Men's Challenger, US	Challenger	Hard	(Australia) Luke Saville	(United States) Mac Kiger (Canada) Benjamin Sigouin	6–4, 3–6, [10–3]
Win	2–0	Nov 2025	Playford Tennis International, Australia	Challenger	Hard	(Australia) Jake Delaney	(India) Anirudh Chandrasekar (United States) Reese Stalder	6–7^{(5–7)}, 7–5, [10–8]
Win	3–0	Nov 2026	River City Challenger, Australia	Challenger	Hard	(Australia) Blake Ellis	(United States) Alafia Ayeni (Japan) Kokoro Isomura	6–7^{(4–7)}, 6–4, [12–10]

== ITF World Tennis Tour finals ==
=== Singles: 14 (9 titles, 5 runner-ups) ===
Legend ITF WTT (9–5)	Finals by surface Hard (8–5) Clay (1–0)

Result	W–L	Date	Tournament	Tier	Surface	Opponent	Score
Win	1–0	Aug 2021	M15 Monastir, Tunisia	WTT	Hard	(Argentina) Mateo Nicolás Martínez	6–1, 6–1
Win	2–0	Sep 2021	M15 Monastir, Tunisia	WTT	Hard	(Brazil) Gabriel Décamps	6–2, 6–1
Win	3–0	Sep 2021	M15 Monastir, Tunisia	WTT	Hard	(Japan) Ryota Tanuma	3–6, 6–1, 6–2
Win	4–0	Nov 2021	M25 Saint-Dizier, France	WTT	Hard (i)	(Australia) Dane Sweeny	1–6, 6–1, 6–4
Win	5–0	Feb 2022	M25 Bendigo, Australia	WTT	Hard	(Australia) Andrew Harris	6–3, 6–1
Win	6–0	May 2022	M25 Cairo, Egypt	WTT	Clay	(Northern Mariana Islands) Colin Sinclair	6–4, 3–6, 6–4
Loss	6–1	May 2022	M15 Monastir, Tunisia	WTT	Hard	(Tunisia) Skander Mansouri	4–6, 2–6
Win	7–1	May 2022	M25 Monastir, Tunisia	WTT	Hard	(Tunisia) Skander Mansouri	6–7^{(3–7)}, 6–4, 7–6^{(7–4)}
Loss	7–2	Jul 2022	M15 Waco, Texas, US	WTT	Hard	(Australia) Adam Walton	5–7, 6–0, 1–6
Win	8–2	Apr 2023	M15 Monastir, Tunisia	WTT	Hard	(Portugal) Daniel Rodrigues	3–6, 6–4, 6–4
Loss	8–3	Apr 2023	M15 Monastir, Tunisia	WTT	Hard	(Portugal) Duarte Vale	3–6, 0–3, ret.
Loss	8–4	Feb 2024	M25 Traralgon, Australia	WTT	Hard	(Australia) Omar Jasika	6–7^{(1–7)}, 2–6
Win	9–4	Mar 2024	M25 Traralgon, Australia	WTT	Hard	(Australia) Alex Bolt	6–4, 6–2
Loss	9–5	Feb 2026	M25 Burnie, Australia	WTT	Hard	(Australia) Enzo Aguiard	3–6, 4–6

=== Doubles: 5 (4 titles, 1 runner-up) ===
Legend ITF WTT (4–1)	Finals by surface Hard (3–1) Clay (1–0)

Result	W–L	Date	Tournament	Tier	Surface	Partner	Opponents	Score
Win	1–0	Aug 2021	M15 Monastir, Tunisia	WTT	Hard	(Australia) Jeremy Beale	(Denmark) August Holmgren (Denmark) Johannes Ingildsen	6–4, 6–2
Win	2–0	Sep 2021	M15 Monastir, Tunisia	WTT	Hard	(New Zealand) Ajeet Rai	(France) Martin Breysach (France) Lilian Marmousez	6–0, 6–4
Win	3–0	Feb 2022	M25 Canberra, Australia	WTT	Hard	(Australia) Dane Sweeny	(Australia) Jayden Court (Australia) David Hough	6–3, 7–5
Loss	3–1	Mar 2022	M25 Bendigo, Australia	WTT	Hard	(Australia) Dane Sweeny	(Australia) Akira Santillan (Australia) Philip Sekulic	5–7, 7–6, [7–10]
Win	4–1	Mar 2022	M25 Canberra, Australia	WTT	Clay	(Australia) Dane Sweeny	(Australia) Matthew Romios (Ukraine) Eric Vanshelboim	7–6, 3–6, [10–7]
