= 2015 KPIT MSLTA Challenger – Doubles =

Doubles
- 2015 KPIT MSLTA Challenger

Final
- Champions: (Spain) Gerard Granollers (Spain) Adrián Menéndez-Maceiras
- Runners-up: (Austria) Maximilian Neuchrist (India) Divij Sharan
- Score: 1–6, 6–3, [10–6]

Events
Singles	Doubles
← 2014 ·	KPIT MSLTA Challenger	· 2016 →

Gerard Granollers and Adrián Menéndez-Maceiras won the title, beating Maximilian Neuchrist and Divij Sharan 1–6, 6–3, [10–6]

== Seeds ==
1. (Russia) Alexander Kudryavtsev / (India) Purav Raja (semifinals)
2. (India) Saketh Myneni / (India) Sanam Singh (semifinals)
3. (Austria) Maximilian Neuchrist / (India) Divij Sharan (final)
4. (Spain) Gerard Granollers / (Spain) Adrián Menéndez-Maceiras (champions)

== Draw ==
=== Key ===
- Q = Qualifier
- WC = Wild card
- LL = Lucky loser
- Alt = Alternate
- SE = Special exempt
- PR = Protected ranking
- ITF = ITF entry
- JE = Junior exempt
- w/o = Walkover
- r = Retired
- d = Defaulted
- SR = Special ranking

=== Draw ===
First round
1	(Russia) A Kudryavtsev (India) P Raja	6	6
WC	(United States) J P Fruttero (India) V S Prashanth	3	4
(Chinese Taipei) T Chen (Czech Republic) Michal Konečný	6	7^{7}
(Italy) A Bega (France) M Janvier	3	6^{4}
4	(Spain) G Granollers (Spain) A Menéndez-Maceiras	3	7^{7}	[10]
(India) C Sood (India) L Sood	6	6^{5}	[5]
WC	(India) Anvit Bendre (India) MM Jayaprakash	6^{1}	4
(India) S Nagal (India) V Vardhan	7^{7}	6
(India) N Kaliyanda Poonacha (India) R Virali-Murugesan	4	6^{4}
(Serbia) N Milojević (India) R Ramanathan	6	7^{7}
WC	(India) S Devvarman (India) Christopher Marquis	6^{3}	4
3	(Austria) M Neuchrist (India) D Sharan	7^{7}	6
(Belgium) G Gigounon (Belgium) Y Mertens	6	6
(Belgium) A De Greef (France) S Robert	2	2
Alt	(Uzbekistan) T Ismailov (India) Arpit Sharma	1	1
2	(India) S Myneni (India) S Singh	6	6

Quarterfinals
1	(Russia) A Kudryavtsev (India) P Raja	6	7
(Chinese Taipei) T Chen (Czech Republic) M Konečný	4	5
4	(Spain) G Granollers (Spain) A Menéndez-Maceiras	w/o
(India) S Nagal (India) V Vardhan
(Serbia) N Milojević (India) R Ramanathan	3	2
3	(Austria) M Neuchrist (India) D Sharan	6	6
(Belgium) G Gigounon (Belgium) Y Mertens	2	3
2	(India) S Myneni (India) S Singh	6	6

Semifinals
1	(Russia) A Kudryavtsev (India) P Raja	6	4	[10]
4	(Spain) G Granollers (Spain) A Menéndez-Maceiras	3	6	[12]
3	(Austria) M Neuchrist (India) D Sharan	4	7	[12]
2	(India) S Myneni (India) S Singh	6	5	[10]

Final
4	(Spain) G Granollers (Spain) A Menéndez-Maceiras	1	6	[10]
3	(Austria) M Neuchrist (India) D Sharan	6	3	[6]
