= 2024 Pune Challenger – Doubles =

Doubles
- 2024 Pune Challenger

Final
- Champions: (Australia) Tristan Schoolkate (Australia) Adam Walton
- Runners-up: (France) Dan Added (South Korea) Chung Yun-seong
- Score: 7–6^{(7–4)}, 7–5

Events
Singles	Doubles
- Pune Challenger

Anirudh Chandrasekar and Vijay Sundar Prashanth were the defending champions but chose not to defend their title.

Tristan Schoolkate and Adam Walton won the title after defeating Dan Added and Chung Yun-seong 7–6^{(7–4)}, 7–5 in the final.

== Seeds ==
1. (India) Arjun Kadhe / (India) Jeevan Nedunchezhiyan (semifinals)
2. (Poland) Piotr Matuszewski / (Australia) Matthew Romios (first round)
3. (France) Dan Added / (South Korea) Chung Yun-seong (final)
4. (India) Sriram Balaji / (Germany) Andre Begemann (first round)

== Draw ==
Key

- Q = Qualifier
- WC = Wild card
- LL = Lucky loser
- Alt = Alternate
- ITF = ITF entry
- PR = Protected ranking
- SR = Special ranking
- SE = Special exempt
- JE = Junior exempt
- JR = Junior Accelerator Programme entrant
- CO = College Accelerator Programme entrant
- NG = Next Gen Accelerator Program entrant
- w/o = Walkover
- r = Retired
- d = Defaulted

First round
1	(India) A Kadhe (India) J Nedunchezhiyan	6	6
(India) RC Bollipalli (India) N Kaliyanda Poonacha	3	3
(Chinese Taipei) R Ho (Australia) C Puttergill	6^{9}	4
(Germany) J Schnaitter (Germany) M Wallner	7^{11}	6
3	(France) D Added (South Korea) Y-s Chung	6	6
(Philippines) FC Alcantara (Japan) K Uchida	2	2
WC	(India) S Banthia (India) Parikshit Somani	5	7^{7}	[10]
(Switzerland) L Margaroli (Portugal) G Oliveira	7	6^{5}	[5]
WC	(India) Sai Karteek Reddy Ganta (India) K Singh	6	3	[4]
(Australia) T Schoolkate (Australia) A Walton	3	6	[10]
(Japan) T Matsui (Japan) K Uesugi	4	7^{7}	[10]
4	(India) S Balaji (Germany) A Begemann	6	6^{5}	[5]
(Croatia) D Ajduković (Italy) E Dalla Valle	7	6
Alt	(France) G Blancaneaux (France) B Bonzi	5	3
(India) S Myneni (India) R Ramanathan	7^{7}	6
2	(Poland) P Matuszewski (Australia) MC Romios	6^{5}	4

Quarterfinals
1	(India) A Kadhe (India) J Nedunchezhiyan	6	7^{8}
(Germany) J Schnaitter (Germany) M Wallner	4	6^{6}
3	(France) D Added (South Korea) Y-s Chung	3	7	[10]
WC	(India) S Banthia (India) P Somani	6	5	[7]
(Australia) T Schoolkate (Australia) A Walton	6	6
(Japan) T Matsui (Japan) K Uesugi	1	0
(Croatia) D Ajduković (Italy) E Dalla Valle	2	7^{7}	[2]
(India) S Myneni (India) R Ramanathan	6	6^{4}	[10]

Semifinals
1	(India) A Kadhe (India) J Nedunchezhiyan	3	4
3	(France) D Added (South Korea) Y-s Chung	6	6
(Australia) T Schoolkate (Australia) A Walton	7^{8}	6
(India) S Myneni (India) R Ramanathan	6^{6}	2

Final
3	(France) D Added (South Korea) Y-s Chung	6^{4}	5
(Australia) T Schoolkate (Australia) A Walton	7^{7}	7
