= 2018 KPIT MSLTA Challenger – Singles =

Singles
- 2018 KPIT MSLTA Challenger

Final
- Champion: (Sweden) Elias Ymer
- Runner-up: (India) Prajnesh Gunneswaran
- Score: 6–2, 7–5

Events
Singles	Doubles
← 2017 ·	KPIT MSLTA Challenger	· 2019 →

Yuki Bhambri was the defending champion but chose not to defend his title.

Elias Ymer won the title after defeating Prajnesh Gunneswaran 6–2, 7–5 in the final.

== Seeds ==
1. (Moldova) Radu Albot (semifinals)
2. (India) Ramkumar Ramanathan (first round)
3. (Sweden) Elias Ymer (champion)
4. (India) Prajnesh Gunneswaran (final)
5. (Australia) Marc Polmans (first round)
6. (United Kingdom) Jay Clarke (second round, retired)
7. (Slovakia) Andrej Martin (first round)
8. (United Kingdom) James Ward (first round)

== Draw ==
=== Key ===
- Q = Qualifier
- WC = Wild card
- LL = Lucky loser
- Alt = Alternate
- SE = Special exempt
- PR = Protected ranking
- ITF = ITF entry
- JE = Junior exempt
- w/o = Walkover
- r = Retired
- d = Defaulted
- SR = Special ranking

=== Finals ===
Semifinals
1	(Moldova) Radu Albot	6	4	4
4	(India) Prajnesh Gunneswaran	1	6	6
3	(Sweden) Elias Ymer	6	3	6
(Canada) Brayden Schnur	3	6	3

Final
4	(India) Prajnesh Gunneswaran	2	5
3	(Sweden) Elias Ymer	6	7

=== Top half ===
First round
1	(Moldova) R Albot	7	6
(India) S Nagal	5	2
(Australia) M Banes	3	6	6
Q	(Italy) Francesco Vilardo	6	4	1
WC	(India) S Mukund	6	7^{7}
SE	(India) S Myneni	4	6^{1}
(Turkey) C İlkel	3	7^{7}	2
6	(United Kingdom) J Clarke	6	6^{3}	6
4	(India) P Gunneswaran	6	6
(Chinese Taipei) T-h Yang	4	4
(United States) C Altamirano	3	1
Q	(Germany) Lucas Gerch	6	6
(Serbia) D Petrović	7	4	4
Q	(Israel) B Patael	5	6	6
(Kazakhstan) A Nedovyesov	6	6
5	(Australia) M Polmans	2	4

Second round
1	(Moldova) R Albot	6	6
(Australia) M Banes	3	1
WC	(India) S Mukund	5	6	4
6	(United Kingdom) J Clarke	7	4	1^{r}
4	(India) P Gunneswaran	6	6
Q	(Germany) L Gerch	1	3
Q	(Israel) B Patael	5	4
(Kazakhstan) A Nedovyesov	7	6

Quarterfinals
1	(Moldova) R Albot	6	4	6
WC	(India) S Mukund	3	6	1
4	(India) P Gunneswaran	6	6
(Kazakhstan) A Nedovyesov	4	4

Semifinals
1	(Moldova) R Albot	6	4	4
4	(India) P Gunneswaran	1	6	6

=== Bottom half ===
First round
8	(United Kingdom) J Ward	4	4
(Australia) M Purcell	6	6
(Netherlands) S Griekspoor	6	3	4
Q	(Germany) S Fanselow	3	6	6
(Germany) D Masur	6	6
(Netherlands) J Sels	4	4
WC	(India) Manish Sureshkumar	4	1
3	(Sweden) E Ymer	6	6
7	(Slovakia) A Martin	2	3
Alt	(Spain) N Kuhn	6	6
LL	(Germany) B Hassan	1	2
(Portugal) F Ferreira Silva	6	6
(Canada) B Schnur	6	6
WC	(India) Aryan Goveas	3	4
WC	(India) A Kadhe	6	6
2	(India) R Ramanathan	3	2

Second round
(Australia) M Purcell	2	1
Q	(Germany) S Fanselow	6	6
(Germany) D Masur	3	6^{4}
3	(Sweden) E Ymer	6	7^{7}
Alt	(Spain) N Kuhn	5	5
(Portugal) F Ferreira Silva	7	7
(Canada) B Schnur	7	6
WC	(India) A Kadhe	5	2

Quarterfinals
Q	(Germany) S Fanselow	7	3	4
3	(Sweden) E Ymer	5	6	6
(Portugal) F Ferreira Silva	6^{6}	6	5
(Canada) B Schnur	7^{8}	2	7

Semifinals
3	(Sweden) E Ymer	6	3	6
(Canada) B Schnur	3	6	3
