= 2015 KPIT MSLTA Challenger – Singles =

Singles
- 2015 KPIT MSLTA Challenger

Final
- Champion: (India) Yuki Bhambri
- Runner-up: (Russia) Evgeny Donskoy
- Score: 6–2, 7–6^{(7–4)}

Events
Singles	Doubles
← 2014 ·	KPIT MSLTA Challenger	· 2016 →

Yuki Bhambri won the title, beating Evgeny Donskoy 6–2, 7–6^{(7–4)}

== Seeds ==
1. (India) Yuki Bhambri (champion)
2. (Russia) Evgeny Donskoy (final)
3. (Spain) Adrián Menéndez-Maceiras (quarterfinals)
4. (United Kingdom) James Ward (semifinals)
5. (India) Saketh Myneni (first round)
6. (India) Somdev Devvarman (second round)
7. (Belgium) Yannick Mertens (first round)
8. (Russia) Alexander Kudryavtsev (semifinals)

== Draw ==
=== Key ===
- Q = Qualifier
- WC = Wild card
- LL = Lucky loser
- Alt = Alternate
- SE = Special exempt
- PR = Protected ranking
- ITF = ITF entry
- JE = Junior exempt
- w/o = Walkover
- r = Retired
- d = Defaulted
- SR = Special ranking

=== Finals ===
Semifinals
1	(India) Yuki Bhambri	7^{8}	6
4	(United Kingdom) James Ward	6^{6}	3
8	(Russia) Alexander Kudryavtsev	4	6	4
2	(Russia) Evgeny Donskoy	6	4	6

Final
1	(India) Yuki Bhambri	6	7^{7}
2	(Russia) Evgeny Donskoy	2	6^{4}

=== Top half ===
First round
1	(India) Y Bhambri	6	6
WC	(India) Anvit Bendre	3	3
(Czech Republic) Michal Konečný	4	1
(Serbia) N Milojević	6	6
Q	(India) P Gunneswaran	6	2	7^{8}
Q	(Uzbekistan) T Ismailov	4	6	6^{6}
(Chinese Taipei) T Chen	6	7^{7}
7	(Belgium) Y Mertens	4	6^{0}
4	(United Kingdom) J Ward	6	4	6
Q	(India) R Virali-Murugesan	2	6	0
WC	(India) V Vardhan	6	7
(Belarus) E Gerasimov	4	5
WC	(India) S Nagal	6	6
Q	(India) P Raja	4	4
(Belarus) I Ivashka	5	6	6
5	(India) S Myneni	7	4	2

Second round
1	(India) Y Bhambri	4	6	6
(Serbia) N Milojević	6	2	4
Q	(India) P Gunneswaran	7^{7}	1	1
(Chinese Taipei) T Chen	6^{4}	6	6
4	(United Kingdom) J Ward	3	6	6
WC	(India) V Vardhan	6	3	4
WC	(India) S Nagal	5	3
(Belarus) I Ivashka	7	6

Quarterfinals
1	(India) Y Bhambri	6	7^{7}
(Chinese Taipei) T Chen	4	6^{4}
4	(United Kingdom) J Ward	6	6
(Belarus) I Ivashka	3	3

Semifinals
1	(India) Y Bhambri	7^{8}	6
4	(United Kingdom) J Ward	6^{6}	3

=== Bottom half ===
First round
8	(Russia) A Kudryavtsev	6	7^{11}
(France) S Robert	3	6^{9}
(Italy) A Bega	4	1
(India) S Singh	6	6
(Spain) G Granollers	6^{6}	4
(India) R Ramanathan	7^{8}	6
(Austria) M Neuchrist	4	3
3	(Spain) A Menéndez-Maceiras	6	6
6	(India) S Devvarman	6	7
(France) M Janvier	4	5
(India) V S Prashanth	6	6
(Belgium) A De Greef	4	4
(Belgium) G Gigounon	6^{1}	6	6
WC	(India) Aryan Goveas	7^{7}	2	3
(United States) D Nguyen	6^{2}	4
2	(Russia) E Donskoy	7^{7}	6

Second round
8	(Russia) A Kudryavtsev	6	6
(India) S Singh	4	2
(India) R Ramanathan	6^{6}	6^{5}
3	(Spain) A Menéndez-Maceiras	7^{8}	7^{7}
6	(India) S Devvarman	5	2
(India) V S Prashanth	7	6
(Belgium) G Gigounon	4	3
2	(Russia) E Donskoy	6	6

Quarterfinals
8	(Russia) A Kudryavtsev	6	6
3	(Spain) A Menéndez-Maceiras	2	1
(India) V S Prashanth	6^{8}	6^{5}
2	(Russia) E Donskoy	7^{10}	7^{7}

Semifinals
8	(Russia) A Kudryavtsev	4	6	4
2	(Russia) E Donskoy	6	4	6
