= 2024 Pune Challenger – Singles =

Singles
- 2024 Pune Challenger

Final
- Champion: (Monaco) Valentin Vacherot
- Runner-up: (Australia) Adam Walton
- Score: 3–6, 7–6^{(7–5)}, 7–6^{(7–5)}

Events
Singles	Doubles
- Pune Challenger

Max Purcell was the defending champion but chose not to defend his title.

Valentin Vacherot won the title after defeating Adam Walton 3–6, 7–6^{(7–5)}, 7–6^{(7–5)} in the final.

== Seeds ==
1. (India) Sumit Nagal (second round)
2. (Croatia) Duje Ajduković (semifinals)
3. (Australia) Adam Walton (final)
4. (Monaco) Valentin Vacherot (champion)
5. (Czech Republic) Dalibor Svrčina (second round, retired)
6. (United Kingdom) Oliver Crawford (first round)
7. (Australia) Dane Sweeny (semifinals)
8. (Italy) Federico Gaio (first round)

== Draw ==
Key

- Q = Qualifier
- WC = Wild card
- LL = Lucky loser
- Alt = Alternate
- ITF = ITF entry
- PR = Protected ranking
- SR = Special ranking
- SE = Special exempt
- JE = Junior exempt
- JR = Junior Accelerator Programme entrant
- CO = College Accelerator Programme entrant
- NG = Next Gen Accelerator Program entrant
- w/o = Walkover
- r = Retired
- d = Defaulted

=== Finals ===
Semifinals
7	(Australia) Dane Sweeny	6	2	4
4	(Monaco) Valentin Vacherot	4	6	6
3	(Australia) Adam Walton	7	7^{8}
2	(Croatia) Duje Ajduković	5	6^{6}

Final
4	(Monaco) Valentin Vacherot	3	7^{7}	7^{7}
3	(Australia) Adam Walton	6	6^{5}	6^{5}

=== Top half ===
First round
1	(India) S Nagal	7^{8}	6
(Chinese Taipei) Y-h Hsu	6^{6}	4
WC	(India) N Kaliyanda Poonacha	6	6^{2}	7^{7}
(Portugal) G Oliveira	3	7^{7}	6^{3}
(South Korea) S-c Hong	4	2
(Poland) M Kaśnikowski	6	6
(France) M Janvier	6	1	6^{4}
7	(Australia) D Sweeny	4	6	7^{7}
4	(Monaco) V Vacherot	6	7
Q	(Canada) V Pospisil	3	5
(France) G Blancaneaux	6^{7}	3
(Australia) T Schoolkate	7^{9}	6
Q	(Australia) B Tomic	4	2
(France) E Couacaud	6	6
Alt	(Australia) P Sekulic	4	3
5	(Czech Republic) D Svrčina	6	6

Second round
1	(India) S Nagal	4	3
WC	(India) N Kaliyanda Poonacha	6	6
(Poland) M Kaśnikowski	4	1
7	(Australia) D Sweeny	6	6
4	(Monaco) V Vacherot	6	6
(Australia) T Schoolkate	1	2
(France) E Couacaud	6	5	4
5	(Czech Republic) D Svrčina	4	7	1^{r}

Quarterfinals
WC	(India) N Kaliyanda Poonacha	6	2	6^{3}
7	(Australia) D Sweeny	4	6	7^{7}
4	(Monaco) V Vacherot	7^{7}	6
(France) E Couacaud	6^{2}	4

Semifinals
7	(Australia) D Sweeny	6	2	4
4	(Monaco) V Vacherot	4	6	6

=== Bottom half ===
First round
8	(Italy) F Gaio	3	2
WC	(India) M Sasikumar	6	6
(Hong Kong) C Wong	6^{4}	6	3
Q	(United Kingdom) F Gill	7^{7}	4	6
(Chinese Taipei) T-l Wu	7^{7}	6^{5}	6
(Belgium) G Onclin	6^{5}	7^{7}	3
Q	(Belgium) R Collignon	6^{1}	2
3	(Australia) A Walton	7^{7}	6
6	(United Kingdom) O Crawford	6^{4}	3
Q	A Zakharov	7^{7}	6
(Italy) S Napolitano	6^{5}	6^{5}
WC	(India) R Ramanathan	7^{7}	7^{7}
(United States) T Boyer	6	4	6
(Spain) O Roca Batalla	2	6	2
Q	(Germany) S Fanselow	7	6^{1}	3
2	(Croatia) D Ajduković	5	7^{7}	6

Second round
WC	(India) M Sasikumar	6	6
Q	(United Kingdom) F Gill	1	0
(Chinese Taipei) T-l Wu	0	7^{7}	6^{4}
3	(Australia) A Walton	6	6^{5}	7^{7}
Q	A Zakharov	6	6
WC	(India) R Ramanathan	4	4
(United States) T Boyer	1	2
2	(Croatia) D Ajduković	6	6

Quarterfinals
WC	(India) M Sasikumar
3	(Australia) A Walton	w/o
Q	A Zakharov	4	3
2	(Croatia) D Ajduković	6	6

Semifinals
3	(Australia) A Walton	7	7^{8}
2	(Croatia) D Ajduković	5	6^{6}
