= 2025 Pune Challenger – Doubles =

Doubles
- 2025 Pune Challenger

Final
- Champions: (India) Jeevan Nedunchezhiyan (India) Vijay Sundar Prashanth
- Runners-up: (Australia) Blake Bayldon (Australia) Matthew Romios
- Score: 3–6, 6–3, [10–0]

Events
| Singles | Doubles |
- Pune Challenger

Tristan Schoolkate and Adam Walton were the defending champions but only Schoolkate chose to defend his title, partnering Blake Ellis. They lost in the quarterfinals to Niki Kaliyanda Poonacha and Courtney John Lock.

Jeevan Nedunchezhiyan and Vijay Sundar Prashanth won the title after defeating Blake Bayldon and Matthew Romios 3–6, 6–3, [10–0] in the final.

== Seeds ==
1. (India) Jeevan Nedunchezhiyan / (India) Vijay Sundar Prashanth (champions)
2. (Australia) Blake Bayldon / (Australia) Matthew Romios (final)
3. (India) Anirudh Chandrasekar / (Chinese Taipei) Ray Ho (first round)
4. (Australia) Blake Ellis / (Australia) Tristan Schoolkate (quarterfinals)

== Draw ==
Key

- Q = Qualifier
- WC = Wild card
- LL = Lucky loser
- Alt = Alternate
- ITF = ITF entry
- PR = Protected ranking
- SR = Special ranking
- SE = Special exempt
- JE = Junior exempt
- JR = Junior Accelerator Programme entrant
- CO = College Accelerator Programme entrant
- NG = Next Gen Accelerator Program entrant
- w/o = Walkover
- r = Retired
- d = Defaulted

=== Draw ===
First round
1 | (India) J Nedunchezhiyan (India) VS Prashanth | 6 | 7^{9}
(Denmark) A Holmgren (Denmark) E Møller | 3 | 6^{7}
(India) S Myneni (India) R Ramanathan | 6 | 6
(Belgium) M Geerts (United Kingdom) B Harris | 0 | 4
4 | (Australia) B Ellis (Australia) T Schoolkate | 6 | 6
(Denmark) J Ingildsen; I Liutarevich | 3 | 4
(Canada) A Galarneau (Canada) K Stevenson | 4 | 6^{1}
(India) N Kaliyanda Poonacha (Zimbabwe) CJ Lock | 6 | 7^{7}
(United Kingdom) J Clarke (Austria) J Rodionov | 6 | 5 | [12]
(France) E Couacaud (Japan) R Noguchi | 3 | 7 | [10]
Alt | P Bar Biryukov; I Simakin | 7^{7} | 6^{5} | [10]
3 | (India) A Chandrasekar (Chinese Taipei) R Ho | 6^{3} | 7^{7} | [4]
WC | (India) K Singh (India) Nitin Kumar Sinha | 2 | 2
Alt | (Italy) E Dalla Valle (Uzbekistan) K Sultanov | 6 | 6
WC | (India) S Banthia (India) Parikshit Somani | 2 | 4
2 | (Australia) B Bayldon (Australia) MC Romios | 6 | 6

Quarterfinals
1 | (India) J Nedunchezhiyan (India) VS Prashanth | 6 | 2 | [12]
(India) S Myneni (India) R Ramanathan | 3 | 6 | [10]
4 | (Australia) B Ellis (Australia) T Schoolkate | 6^{4} | 7^{7} | [8]
(India) N Kaliyanda Poonacha (Zimbabwe) CJ Lock | 7^{7} | 6^{4} | [10]
(United Kingdom) J Clarke (Austria) J Rodionov | 7^{7} | 6
Alt | P Bar Biryukov; I Simakin | 6^{5} | 3
Alt | (Italy) E Dalla Valle (Uzbekistan) K Sultanov | 3 | 6 | [10]
2 | (Australia) B Bayldon (Australia) MC Romios | 6 | 4 | [12]

Semifinals
1 | (India) J Nedunchezhiyan (India) VS Prashanth | 7^{7} | 6
(India) N Kaliyanda Poonacha (Zimbabwe) CJ Lock | 6^{5} | 4
(United Kingdom) J Clarke (Austria) J Rodionov | 3 | 6 | [5]
2 | (Australia) B Bayldon (Australia) MC Romios | 6 | 3 | [10]

Final
1 | (India) J Nedunchezhiyan (India) VS Prashanth | 3 | 6 | [10]
2 | (Australia) B Bayldon (Australia) MC Romios | 6 | 3 | [0]
