= 2016 KPIT MSLTA Challenger – Doubles =

Doubles
- 2016 KPIT MSLTA Challenger

Final
- Champions: (India) Purav Raja (India) Divij Sharan
- Runners-up: (Switzerland) Luca Margaroli (France) Hugo Nys
- Score: 3–6, 6–3, [11–9]

Events
Singles	Doubles
← 2015 ·	KPIT MSLTA Challenger	· 2017 →

Gerard Granollers and Adrián Menéndez-Maceiras were the defending champions but only Menéndez-Maceiras defended his title, partnering John Paul Fruttero. Ménendez-Maceiras lost in the first round to Luca Margaroli and Hugo Nys.

Purav Raja and Divij Sharan won the title after defeating Margaroli and Nys 3–6, 6–3, [11–9] in the final.

== Seeds ==
1. (India) Purav Raja / (India) Divij Sharan (champions)
2. (India) Leander Paes / (India) Ramkumar Ramanathan (quarterfinals)
3. (India) Saketh Myneni / (India) Sanam Singh (first round)
4. (India) Jeevan Nedunchezhiyan / (India) Vijay Sundar Prashanth (semifinals)

== Draw ==
=== Key ===
- Q = Qualifier
- WC = Wild card
- LL = Lucky loser
- Alt = Alternate
- SE = Special exempt
- PR = Protected ranking
- ITF = ITF entry
- JE = Junior exempt
- w/o = Walkover
- r = Retired
- d = Defaulted
- SR = Special ranking

First round
1	(India) P Raja (India) D Sharan	6	7^{7}
(France) S Doumbia (France) F Reboul	4	6^{4}
(Ukraine) M Deviatiarov (Kazakhstan) D Popko	7	6
WC	(India) A Chandrasekar (India) Vignesh Peranamallur	5	4
3	(India) S Myneni (India) S Singh	7^{7}	3	[4]
(India) S Balaji (India) V Vardhan	6^{2}	6	[10]
(Spain) Marc Giner (Russia) A Zhurbin	7^{7}	4	[4]
(Serbia) N Milojević (Serbia) D Petrović	6^{4}	6	[10]
(India) MM Jayaprakash (India) Vinayak Sharma Kaza	6	6
WC	(India) Tejas Chaukulkar (India) Jayesh Pungliya	2	4
WC	(India) Abhinav Sanjeev Shanmugam (India) R Virali-Murugesan	0	4
4	(India) J Nedunchezhiyan (India) VS Prashanth	6	6
(Switzerland) L Margaroli (France) H Nys	7	7
(United States) JP Fruttero (Spain) A Menéndez-Maceiras	5	5
(India) Anvit Bendre (India) Sidharth Rawat	3	4
2	(India) L Paes (India) R Ramanathan	6	6

Quarterfinals
1	(India) P Raja (India) D Sharan	7^{7}	6
(Ukraine) M Deviatiarov (Kazakhstan) D Popko	6^{0}	4
(India) S Balaji (India) V Vardhan	3	4
(Serbia) N Milojević (Serbia) D Petrović	6	6
(India) MM Jayaprakash (India) VS Kaza	2	4
4	(India) J Nedunchezhiyan (India) VS Prashanth	6	6
(Switzerland) L Margaroli (France) H Nys	2	6	[10]
2	(India) L Paes (India) R Ramanathan	6	3	[4]

Semifinals
1	(India) P Raja (India) D Sharan	6	6
(Serbia) N Milojević (Serbia) D Petrović	4	2
4	(India) J Nedunchezhiyan (India) VS Prashanth	3	6	[11]
(Switzerland) L Margaroli (France) H Nys	6	3	[13]

Final
1	(India) P Raja (India) D Sharan	3	6	[11]
(Switzerland) L Margaroli (France) H Nys	6	3	[9]
