= 2026 Pune Challenger – Doubles =

Doubles
- 2026 Pune Challenger

Final
- Champions: (South Korea) Nam Ji-sung (Finland) Patrik Niklas-Salminen
- Runners-up: (Thailand) Pruchya Isaro (India) Niki Kaliyanda Poonacha
- Score: 6–4, 6–7^{(1–7)}, [10–7]

Events
Singles	Doubles
- Pune Challenger

Jeevan Nedunchezhiyan and Vijay Sundar Prashanth were the defending champions but chose not to defend their title.

Nam Ji-sung and Patrik Niklas-Salminen won the title after defeating Pruchya Isaro and Niki Kaliyanda Poonacha 6–4, 6–7^{(1–7)}, [10–7] in the final.

== Seeds ==
1. (India) Siddhant Banthia / (Bulgaria) Alexander Donski (semifinals)
2. (Thailand) Pruchya Isaro / (India) Niki Kaliyanda Poonacha (final)
3. (Japan) Yuta Shimizu / (Japan) Seita Watanabe (semifinals)
4. (South Korea) Nam Ji-sung / (Finland) Patrik Niklas-Salminen (champions)

== Draw ==
Key

- Q = Qualifier
- WC = Wild card
- LL = Lucky loser
- Alt = Alternate
- ITF = ITF entry
- PR = Protected ranking
- SR = Special ranking
- SE = Special exempt
- JE = Junior exempt
- JR = Junior Accelerator Programme entrant
- CO = College Accelerator Programme entrant
- NG = Next Gen Accelerator Program entrant
- w/o = Walkover
- r = Retired
- d = Defaulted

First round
1	(India) S Banthia (Bulgaria) A Donski	7^{7}	6
(Switzerland) L Castelnuovo (South Korea) U-s Park	6^{5}	2
(India) A Kalyanpur (India) M Sasikumar	4	4
P Bar Biryukov (Italy) A Binda	6	6
4	(South Korea) J-s Nam (Finland) P Niklas-Salminen	6	6
WC	(India) M Dhamne (India) Aditya Vishal Balsekar	2	1
(Japan) Ryuki Matsuda; I Simakin	7^{7}	7
Alt	(India) Aryan Lakshmanan (Malaysia) Mitsuki Wei Kang Leong	6^{3}	5
WC	(India) S Myneni (India) Digvijaypratap Singh	6	6
(Japan) M Imamura (Japan) K Isomura	3	3
(India) SDP Dev (India) Nitin Kumar Sinha	4	6^{2}
3	(Japan) Y Shimizu (Japan) S Watanabe	6	7^{7}
(Japan) Takuya Kumasaka (Japan) R Noguchi	3	4
(United Kingdom) J Clarke (Belgium) M Geerts	6	6
PR	E Agafonov; I Ivashka
2	(Thailand) P Isaro (India) N Kaliyanda Poonacha	w/o

Quarterfinals
1	(India) S Banthia (Bulgaria) A Donski	7^{7}	6
P Bar Biryukov (Italy) A Binda	6^{4}	3
4	(South Korea) J-s Nam (Finland) P Niklas-Salminen	6	6
(Japan) R Matsuda; I Simakin	3	3
WC	(India) S Myneni (India) D Singh	4	4
3	(Japan) Y Shimizu (Japan) S Watanabe	6	6
(United Kingdom) J Clarke (Belgium) M Geerts	0^{r}
2	(Thailand) P Isaro (India) N Kaliyanda Poonacha	1

Semifinals
1	(India) S Banthia (Bulgaria) A Donski	2	4
4	(South Korea) J-s Nam (Finland) P Niklas-Salminen	6	6
3	(Japan) Y Shimizu (Japan) S Watanabe	5	6^{4}
2	(Thailand) P Isaro (India) N Kaliyanda Poonacha	7	7^{7}

Final
4	(South Korea) J-s Nam (Finland) P Niklas-Salminen	6	6^{1}	[10]
2	(Thailand) P Isaro (India) N Kaliyanda Poonacha	4	7^{7}	[7]
