= 2016 KPIT MSLTA Challenger – Singles =

Singles
- 2016 KPIT MSLTA Challenger

Final
- Champion: (France) Sadio Doumbia
- Runner-up: (India) Prajnesh Gunneswaran
- Score: 4–6, 6–4, 6–3

Events
Singles	Doubles
← 2015 ·	KPIT MSLTA Challenger	· 2017 →

Yuki Bhambri was the defending champion but chose not to defend his title.

Sadio Doumbia won the title after defeating Prajnesh Gunneswaran 4–6, 6–4, 6–3 in the final.

== Seeds ==
1. (Russia) Evgeny Donskoy (quarterfinals)
2. (South Korea) Lee Duck-hee (semifinals)
3. (India) Saketh Myneni (quarterfinals)
4. (Spain) Adrián Menéndez-Maceiras (quarterfinals)
5. (India) Ramkumar Ramanathan (second round)
6. (Serbia) Nikola Milojević (semifinals)
7. (Kazakhstan) Dmitry Popko (quarterfinals)
8. (India) Prajnesh Gunneswaran (final)

== Draw ==
=== Key ===
- Q = Qualifier
- WC = Wild card
- LL = Lucky loser
- Alt = Alternate
- SE = Special exempt
- PR = Protected ranking
- ITF = ITF entry
- JE = Junior exempt
- w/o = Walkover
- r = Retired
- d = Defaulted
- SR = Special ranking

=== Finals ===
Semifinals
(France) Sadio Doumbia	5	6	6
6	(Serbia) Nikola Milojević	7	3	2
8	(India) Prajnesh Gunneswaran	6	7
2	(South Korea) Lee Duck-hee	2	5

Final
(France) Sadio Doumbia	4	6	6
8	(India) Prajnesh Gunneswaran	6	4	3

=== Top half ===
First round
1	(Russia) E Donskoy	6	6
(India) MM Jayaprakash	4	2
(India) Siddharth Vishwakarma	4	6	3
WC	(India) Dhruv Sunish	6	2	6
(France) S Doumbia	4	6	6
(India) S Mukund	6	4	4
(Russia) A Zhurbin	2	6	3
5	(India) R Ramanathan	6	3	6
4/WC	(Spain) A Menéndez-Maceiras	6	6
(Russia) Shalva Dzhanashiya	2	2
(Spain) Marc Giner	5	3
(India) S Nagal	7	6
(France) F Reboul	7^{7}	5	6
Q	(Ukraine) M Deviatiarov	6^{4}	7	4
(India) S Balaji	5	6^{2}
6	(Serbia) N Milojević	7	7^{7}

Second round
1	(Russia) E Donskoy	6	6
WC	(India) D Sunish	3	2
(France) S Doumbia	6	7
5	(India) R Ramanathan	2	5
4/WC	(Spain) A Menéndez-Maceiras	6^{2}	7^{8}	6
(India) S Nagal	7^{7}	6^{6}	4
(France) F Reboul	1	6^{3}
6	(Serbia) N Milojević	6	7^{7}

Quarterfinals
1	(Russia) E Donskoy	6	4	4
(France) S Doumbia	3	6	6
4/WC	(Spain) A Menéndez-Maceiras	4	6^{3}
6	(Serbia) N Milojević	6	7^{7}

Semifinals
(France) S Doumbia	5	6	6
6	(Serbia) N Milojević	7	3	2

=== Bottom half ===
First round
8	(India) P Gunneswaran	7	2	6
(India) Haadin Salim Bava	5	6	4
(India) VS Prashanth	6	6
WC	(India) Jayesh Pungliya	2	4
Q	(India) R Virali-Murugesan	5	7^{7}	2
(India) Sidharth Rawat	7	6^{2}	6
(Serbia) D Petrović	6	3	6^{3}
3	(India) S Myneni	1	6	7^{7}
7	(Kazakhstan) D Popko	3	7^{8}	7^{7}
(India) S Singh	6	6^{6}	6^{5}
(India) Vinayak Sharma Kaza	6^{2}	4
WC	(India) V Vardhan	7^{7}	6
(India) Anvit Bendre	3	3
Q	(Switzerland) L Margaroli	6	6
Q	(France) H Nys	3	7^{7}	1
2	(South Korea) D-h Lee	6	6^{4}	6

Second round
8	(India) P Gunneswaran	6	6
(India) VS Prashanth	4	2
(India) S Rawat	0	6	1
3	(India) S Myneni	6	2	6
7	(Kazakhstan) D Popko	6	6
WC	(India) V Vardhan	4	4
Q	(Switzerland) L Margaroli	6^{3}	3
2	(South Korea) D-h Lee	7^{7}	6

Quarterfinals
8	(India) P Gunneswaran	6^{5}	6	6
3	(India) S Myneni	7^{7}	2	0
7	(Kazakhstan) D Popko	3	4
2	(South Korea) D-h Lee	6	6

Semifinals
8	(India) P Gunneswaran	6	7
2	(South Korea) D-h Lee	2	5
