= 2014 KPIT MSLTA Challenger – Singles =

Singles
- 2014 KPIT MSLTA Challenger

Final
- Champion: (Japan) Yūichi Sugita
- Runner-up: (Spain) Adrián Menéndez-Maceiras
- Score: 6–7^{(1–7)}, 6–4, 6–4

Events
Singles	Doubles
KPIT MSLTA Challenger	· 2015 →

This was the first edition of the tournament.

Yūichi Sugita won the title, defeating Adrián Menéndez-Maceiras in the final, 6–7^{(1–7)}, 6–4, 6–4.

== Seeds ==
1. (Kazakhstan) Aleksandr Nedovyesov (quarterfinals)
2. (Russia) Alexander Kudryavtsev (quarterfinals)
3. (India) Somdev Devvarman (second round)
4. (Japan) Yūichi Sugita (champion)
5. (Japan) Hiroki Moriya (second round)
6. (Spain) Adrián Menéndez-Maceiras (final)
7. (India) Yuki Bhambri (quarterfinals)
8. (Belgium) Kimmer Coppejans (semifinals)

== Draw ==
=== Key ===
- Q = Qualifier
- WC = Wild card
- LL = Lucky loser
- Alt = Alternate
- SE = Special exempt
- PR = Protected ranking
- ITF = ITF entry
- JE = Junior exempt
- w/o = Walkover
- r = Retired
- d = Defaulted
- SR = Special ranking

=== Finals ===
Semifinals
SE	(India) Saketh Myneni	3	4
4	(Japan) Yūichi Sugita	6	6
8	(Belgium) Kimmer Coppejans	5	6^{4}
6	(Spain) Adrián Menéndez-Maceiras	7	7^{7}

Final
4	(Japan) Yūichi Sugita	6^{1}	6	6
6	(Spain) Adrián Menéndez-Maceiras	7^{7}	4	4

=== Top half ===
First round
1	(Kazakhstan) A Nedovyesov	6	6
(Thailand) D Udomchoke	3	1
(Japan) Y Uchiyama	5	1
Alt	(Germany) R Becker	7	6
(France) F Martin	2	2
SE	(India) S Myneni	6	6
Q	(Italy) R Ghedin	3	6^{4}
5	(Japan) H Moriya	6	7^{7}
4	(Japan) Y Sugita	7	7^{7}
(India) R Ramanathan	5	6^{4}
(Japan) T Matsui	7^{7}	6
(Chinese Taipei) T Chen	6^{3}	4
(Belgium) G Gigounon	6	6
Q	(Uzbekistan) S Ikramov	1	4
(Chinese Taipei) L-c Huang	0	3
7	(India) Y Bhambri	6	6

Second round
1	(Kazakhstan) A Nedovyesov	7^{7}	4	7^{8}
Alt	(Germany) R Becker	6^{2}	6	6^{6}
SE	(India) S Myneni	6	6
5	(Japan) H Moriya	1	2
4	(Japan) Y Sugita	6	7
(Japan) T Matsui	4	5
(Belgium) G Gigounon	5	4
7	(India) Y Bhambri	7	6

Quarterfinals
1	(Kazakhstan) A Nedovyesov	3	4
SE	(India) S Myneni	6	6
4	(Japan) Y Sugita	6	6
7	(India) Y Bhambri	3	4

Semifinals
SE	(India) S Myneni	6^{4}	4
4	(Japan) Y Sugita	7^{7}	6

=== Bottom half ===
First round
8	(Belgium) K Coppejans	6	7
Q	(India) P Raja	4	5
WC	(India) V Vardhan	7^{7}	6^{7}	6
(Belgium) Y Reuter	6^{5}	7^{9}	3
(Czech Republic) A Pavlásek	6	6
(India) J Nedunchezhiyan	4	1
WC	(India) A Kadhe	1	3
3	(India) S Devvarman	6	6
6	(Spain) A Menéndez-Maceiras	6	6
(India) S Balaji	4	4
(India) S Singh	5
(Italy) S Travaglia	2^{r}
Q	(India) VS Prashanth	7^{8}	3	6
(India) S Mukund	6^{6}	6	1
WC	(India) Sidharth Rawat	6	3	2
2	(Russia) A Kudryavtsev	4	6	6

Second round
8	(Belgium) K Coppejans	6	3	6
WC	(India) V Vardhan	2	6	3
(Czech Republic) A Pavlásek	6	7^{7}
3	(India) S Devvarman	3	6^{3}
6	(Spain) A Menéndez-Maceiras	6	6
(India) S Singh	1	2
Q	(India) VS Prashanth	0	6^{5}
2	(Russia) A Kudryavtsev	6	7^{7}

Quarterfinals
8	(Belgium) K Coppejans	3	6	6
(Czech Republic) A Pavlásek	6	3	4
6	(Spain) A Menéndez-Maceiras	6	6
2	(Russia) A Kudryavtsev	4	1

Semifinals
8	(Belgium) K Coppejans	5	6^{4}
6	(Spain) A Menéndez-Maceiras	7	7^{7}
