= 2017 KPIT MSLTA Challenger – Singles =

Singles
- 2017 KPIT MSLTA Challenger

Final
- Champion: (India) Yuki Bhambri
- Runner-up: (India) Ramkumar Ramanathan
- Score: 4–6, 6–3, 6–4

Events
Singles	Doubles
← 2016 ·	KPIT MSLTA Challenger	· 2018 →

Sadio Doumbia was the defending champion but chose not to defend his title.

Yuki Bhambri won the title after defeating Ramkumar Ramanathan 4–6, 6–3, 6–4 in the final.

== Seeds ==
1. (Slovenia) Blaž Kavčič (quarterfinals)
2. (Spain) Adrián Menéndez Maceiras (semifinals)
3. (India) Yuki Bhambri (champion)
4. (India) Ramkumar Ramanathan (final)
5. (Serbia) Nikola Milojević (quarterfinals)
6. (Sweden) Elias Ymer (withdrew)
7. (United States) Evan King (second round)
8. (Serbia) Peđa Krstin (second round)
9. (Kazakhstan) Aleksandr Nedovyesov (quarterfinals, retired)

== Draw ==
=== Key ===
- Q = Qualifier
- WC = Wild card
- LL = Lucky loser
- Alt = Alternate
- ITF = ITF entry
- PR = Protected ranking
- SR = Special ranking
- SE = Special exempt
- JE = Junior exempt
- JR = Junior Accelerator Programme entrant
- CO = College Accelerator Programme entrant
- NG = Next Gen Accelerator Program entrant
- w/o = Walkover
- r = Retired
- d = Defaulted

=== Finals ===
Semifinals
WC	(India) Saketh Myneni	3	2
4	(India) Ramkumar Ramanathan	6	6
3	(India) Yuki Bhambri	6	6
2	(Spain) Adrián Menéndez Maceiras	2	4

Final
4	(India) Ramkumar Ramanathan	6	3	4
3	(India) Yuki Bhambri	4	6	6

=== Top half ===
First round
1	(Slovenia) B Kavčič	6	6
(France) G Blancaneaux	4	4
LL	(India) VS Prashanth	6	6
WC	(India) Aryan Goveas	3	4
(Bosnia and Herzegovina) T Brkić	3	6	2
WC	(India) S Myneni	6	4	6
Q	(France) A Escoffier	4	6^{5}
8	(Serbia) P Krstin	6	7^{7}
4	(India) R Ramanathan	6^{5}	7^{7}	7^{11}
(Australia) M Polmans	7^{7}	6^{5}	6^{9}
(United Kingdom) B Klein	6	6
(Spain) P Martínez	2	3
Q	(France) H Grenier	6^{4}	6	6
(Chinese Taipei) T-h Yang	7^{7}	0	0
(Russia) I Nedelko	4	1
5	(Serbia) N Milojević	6	6

Second round
1	(Slovenia) B Kavčič	6	6
LL	(India) VS Prashanth	3	2
WC	(India) S Myneni	4	6	6
8	(Serbia) P Krstin	6	2	0
4	(India) R Ramanathan	7^{9}	6
(United Kingdom) B Klein	6^{7}	3
Q	(France) H Grenier	5	3
5	(Serbia) N Milojević	7	6

Quarterfinals
1	(Slovenia) B Kavčič	6^{5}	6^{5}
WC	(India) S Myneni	7^{7}	7^{7}
4	(India) R Ramanathan	6	7
5	(Serbia) N Milojević	1	5

Semifinals
WC	(India) S Myneni	3	2
4	(India) R Ramanathan	6	6

=== Bottom half ===
First round
7	(United States) E King	6	6
(India) P Gunneswaran	3	3
(Spain) M Vilella Martínez	6	4	4
(United Kingdom) J Clarke	3	6	6
(Croatia) A Pavić	7^{7}	7^{7}
WC	(India) A Kadhe	6^{5}	6^{4}
Q	(Japan) K Uchida	2	5
3	(India) Y Bhambri	6	7
9	(Kazakhstan) A Nedovyesov	6	4	7^{8}
WC	(India) V Vardhan	3	6	6^{6}
(Egypt) K-M Maamoun	4	2
(India) S Balaji	6	6
(India) S Nagal	7^{7}	6
(Austria) L Miedler	6^{1}	0
Q	(Croatia) B Gojo	2	3
2	(Spain) A Menéndez Maceiras	6	6

Second round
7	(United States) E King	3	4
(United Kingdom) J Clarke	6	6
(Croatia) A Pavić	4	6^{4}
3	(India) Y Bhambri	6	7^{7}
9	(Kazakhstan) A Nedovyesov	5	6	7
(India) S Balaji	7	4	5
(India) S Nagal	3	4
2	(Spain) A Menéndez Maceiras	6	6

Quarterfinals
(United Kingdom) J Clarke	4	0
3	(India) Y Bhambri	6	6
9	(Kazakhstan) A Nedovyesov	5	1^{r}
2	(Spain) A Menéndez Maceiras	7	4

Semifinals
3	(India) Y Bhambri	6	6
2	(Spain) A Menéndez Maceiras	2	4
