= 2018 KPIT MSLTA Challenger – Doubles =

Doubles
- 2018 KPIT MSLTA Challenger

Final
- Champions: (India) Vijay Sundar Prashanth (India) Ramkumar Ramanathan
- Runners-up: (Chinese Taipei) Hsieh Cheng-peng (Chinese Taipei) Yang Tsung-hua
- Score: 7–6^{(7–3)}, 6–7^{(5–7)}, [10–7]

Events
Singles	Doubles
← 2017 ·	KPIT MSLTA Challenger	· 2019 →

Tomislav Brkić and Ante Pavić were the defending champions but chose not to defend their title.

Vijay Sundar Prashanth and Ramkumar Ramanathan won the title after defeating Hsieh Cheng-peng and Yang Tsung-hua 7–6^{(7–3)}, 6–7^{(5–7)}, [10–7] in the final.

== Seeds ==
1. (India) Purav Raja / (Croatia) Antonio Šančić (quarterfinals)
2. (India) Sriram Balaji / (India) Vishnu Vardhan (first round)
3. (Chinese Taipei) Hsieh Cheng-peng / (Chinese Taipei) Yang Tsung-hua (final)
4. (Slovakia) Andrej Martin / (Chile) Hans Podlipnik Castillo (semifinals)

== Draw ==
=== Key ===
- Q = Qualifier
- WC = Wild card
- LL = Lucky loser
- Alt = Alternate
- SE = Special exempt
- PR = Protected ranking
- ITF = ITF entry
- JE = Junior exempt
- w/o = Walkover
- r = Retired
- d = Defaulted
- SR = Special ranking

First round
1	(India) P Raja (Croatia) A Šančić	4	7^{8}	[10]
(Germany) D Masur (Austria) T-S Weissborn	6	6^{6}	[8]
(Turkey) C İlkel (Serbia) D Petrović	4	6	[14]
(Australia) M Purcell (Australia) L Saville	6	1	[16]
3	(Chinese Taipei) C-p Hsieh (Chinese Taipei) T-h Yang	6	6
(Netherlands) S Griekspoor (Netherlands) J Sels	4	2
(India) A Kadhe (India) S Myneni	6	6
WC	(India) Parikshit Somani (India) D Suresh	1	1
Alt	(India) Kunal Anand (India) Shahbaaz Khan	2	4
WC	(India) S Banthia (India) Anvit Bendre	6	6
Alt	(United States) C Altamirano (Australia) M Banes	4	5
4	(Slovakia) A Martin (Chile) H Podlipnik Castillo	6	7
(India) VS Prashanth (India) R Ramanathan	7^{7}	6
WC	(India) Aryan Goveas (India) Dhruv Sunish	6^{3}	1
(Uzbekistan) S Fayziev (Kazakhstan) A Nedovyesov	6	6
2	(India) S Balaji (India) V Vardhan	2	2

Quarterfinals
1	(India) P Raja (Croatia) A Šančić	7	3	[11]
(Australia) M Purcell (Australia) L Saville	5	6	[13]
3	(Chinese Taipei) C-p Hsieh (Chinese Taipei) T-h Yang	6	7^{11}
(India) A Kadhe (India) S Myneni	3	6^{9}
WC	(India) S Banthia (India) A Bendre	4	4
4	(Slovakia) A Martin (Chile) H Podlipnik Castillo	6	6
(India) VS Prashanth (India) R Ramanathan	6	6
(Uzbekistan) S Fayziev (Kazakhstan) A Nedovyesov	3	4

Semifinals
(Australia) M Purcell (Australia) L Saville	7^{7}	3	[6]
3	(Chinese Taipei) C-p Hsieh (Chinese Taipei) T-h Yang	6^{4}	6	[10]
4	(Slovakia) A Martin (Chile) H Podlipnik Castillo	6^{7}	0
(India) VS Prashanth (India) R Ramanathan	7^{9}	6

Final
3	(Chinese Taipei) C-p Hsieh (Chinese Taipei) T-h Yang	6^{3}	7^{7}	[7]
(India) VS Prashanth (India) R Ramanathan	7^{7}	6^{5}	[10]
