= 2019 KPIT MSLTA Challenger – Doubles =

Doubles
- 2019 KPIT MSLTA Challenger

Final
- Champions: (India) Purav Raja (India) Ramkumar Ramanathan
- Runners-up: (India) Arjun Kadhe (India) Saketh Myneni
- Score: 7–6^{(7–3)}, 6–3

Events
Singles	Doubles
← 2018 ·	KPIT MSLTA Challenger	· 2023 →

Vijay Sundar Prashanth and Ramkumar Ramanathan were the defending champions but chose to defend their title with different partners. Prashanth partnered Brydan Klein but lost in the semifinals to Purav Raja and Ramanathan. Ramanathan partnered Raja and successfully defended his title.

Raja and Ramanathan won the title after defeating Arjun Kadhe and Saketh Myneni 7–6^{(7–3)}, 6–3 in the final.

== Seeds ==
1. (India) Purav Raja / (India) Ramkumar Ramanathan (champions)
2. (Japan) Toshihide Matsui / (India) Vishnu Vardhan (semifinals)
3. (India) Arjun Kadhe / (India) Saketh Myneni (final)
4. (United Kingdom) Brydan Klein / (India) Vijay Sundar Prashanth (semifinals)

== Draw ==
=== Key ===
- Q = Qualifier
- WC = Wild card
- LL = Lucky loser
- Alt = Alternate
- SE = Special exempt
- PR = Protected ranking
- ITF = ITF entry
- JE = Junior exempt
- w/o = Walkover
- r = Retired
- d = Defaulted
- SR = Special ranking

First round
1	(India) P Raja (India) R Ramanathan	6	6
WC	(India) Anvit Bendre (India) Parikshit Somani	2	4
(Tunisia) A Dougaz (France) C Hemery	6	7
WC	(Spain) D Marrero (United States) Dhruva Mulye	2	5
4	(United Kingdom) B Klein (India) VS Prashanth	6	6
WC	(India) Aryan Goveas (India) Dhruv Sunish	2	1
(India) A Chandrasekar (India) N Kaliyanda Poonacha	7	6
(India) Sidharth Rawat (India) Manish Sureshkumar	5	3
(Greece) M Kalovelonis (Kazakhstan) T Khabibulin	4	7^{7}	[3]
(Russia) B Bobrov (Russia) I Nedelko	6	6^{5}	[10]
(Ukraine) D Kalenichenko (Austria) D Pichler	3	6	[5]
3	(India) A Kadhe (India) S Myneni	6	3	[10]
(Turkey) C İlkel (Turkey) E Kırkın	2	2
(Canada) S Diez (Spain) R Ortega Olmedo	6	6
(Japan) R Noguchi (Japan) Y Takahashi	3	3
2	(Japan) T Matsui (India) V Vardhan	6	6

Quarterfinals
1	(India) P Raja (India) R Ramanathan	6	6
(Tunisia) A Dougaz (France) C Hemery	3	4
4	(United Kingdom) B Klein (India) VS Prashanth	6	6
(India) A Chandrasekar (India) N Kaliyanda Poonacha	2	3
(Russia) B Bobrov (Russia) I Nedelko	4	6	[14]
3	(India) A Kadhe (India) S Myneni	6	4	[16]
(Canada) S Diez (Spain) R Ortega Olmedo	6	2	[4]
2	(Japan) T Matsui (India) V Vardhan	3	6	[10]

Semifinals
1	(India) P Raja (India) R Ramanathan	6	7
4	(United Kingdom) B Klein (India) VS Prashanth	4	5
3	(India) A Kadhe (India) S Myneni	5	7^{7}	[10]
2	(Japan) T Matsui (India) V Vardhan	7	6^{1}	[4]

Final
1	(India) P Raja (India) R Ramanathan	7^{7}	6
3	(India) A Kadhe (India) S Myneni	6^{3}	3
