= 2017 KPIT MSLTA Challenger – Doubles =

Doubles
- 2017 KPIT MSLTA Challenger

Final
- Champions: (Bosnia and Herzegovina) Tomislav Brkić (Croatia) Ante Pavić
- Runners-up: (Spain) Pedro Martínez (Spain) Adrián Menéndez Maceiras
- Score: 6–1, 7–6^{(7–5)}

Events
Singles	Doubles
← 2016 ·	KPIT MSLTA Challenger	· 2018 →

Purav Raja and Divij Sharan were the defending champions but only Sharan chose to defend his title, partnering Mikhail Elgin. Sharan lost in the first round to Evan King and Lucas Miedler.

Tomislav Brkić and Ante Pavić won the title after defeating Pedro Martínez and Adrián Menéndez Maceiras 6–1, 7–6^{(7–5)} in the final.

== Seeds ==
1. (Russia) Mikhail Elgin / (India) Divij Sharan (first round)
2. (United Kingdom) Brydan Klein / (Australia) Marc Polmans (quarterfinals)
3. (India) Sriram Balaji / (India) Vishnu Vardhan (first round)
4. (United Kingdom) Scott Clayton / (United Kingdom) Jonny O'Mara (semifinals)

== Draw ==
=== Key ===
- Q = Qualifier
- WC = Wild card
- LL = Lucky loser
- Alt = Alternate
- SE = Special exempt
- PR = Protected ranking
- ITF = ITF entry
- JE = Junior exempt
- w/o = Walkover
- r = Retired
- d = Defaulted
- SR = Special ranking

First round
1	(Russia) M Elgin (India) D Sharan	6^{9}	4
(United States) E King (Austria) L Miedler	7^{11}	6
(Bosnia and Herzegovina) T Brkić (Croatia) A Pavić	6	6
(Egypt) K-M Maamoun (Serbia) N Milojević	1	4
4	(United Kingdom) S Clayton (United Kingdom) J O'Mara	6	4	[10]
(Kazakhstan) T Khabibulin (Kazakhstan) A Nedovyesov	3	6	[8]
(Croatia) I Sabanov (Croatia) M Sabanov	6	7
WC	(India) A Kadhe (India) VS Prashanth	3	5
WC	(India) S Banthia (India) Jayesh Pungliya	5	0
WC	(India) S Nagal (Japan) N Nakagawa	7	6
PR	(India) S Myneni (India) J Nedunchezhiyan	6	6
3	(India) S Balaji (India) V Vardhan	3	4
(France) G Blancaneaux (United Kingdom) J Clarke	7^{7}	3	[8]
(Spain) P Martínez (Spain) A Menéndez Maceiras	6^{5}	6	[10]
(Serbia) P Krstin (Chinese Taipei) T-h Yang	6^{2}	3
2	(United Kingdom) B Klein (Australia) M Polmans	7^{7}	6

Quarterfinals
(United States) E King (Austria) L Miedler	4	2
(Bosnia and Herzegovina) T Brkić (Croatia) A Pavić	6	6
4	(United Kingdom) S Clayton (United Kingdom) J O'Mara	6	6
(Croatia) I Sabanov (Croatia) M Sabanov	2	4
WC	(India) S Nagal (Japan) N Nakagawa	0	3
PR	(India) S Myneni (India) J Nedunchezhiyan	6	6
(Spain) P Martínez (Spain) A Menéndez Maceiras	6	6
2	(United Kingdom) B Klein (Australia) M Polmans	2	4

Semifinals
(Bosnia and Herzegovina) T Brkić (Croatia) A Pavić	7	6
4	(United Kingdom) S Clayton (United Kingdom) J O'Mara	5	4
PR	(India) S Myneni (India) J Nedunchezhiyan	4	4
(Spain) P Martínez (Spain) A Menéndez Maceiras	6	6

Final
(Bosnia and Herzegovina) T Brkić (Croatia) A Pavić	6	7^{7}
(Spain) P Martínez (Spain) A Menéndez Maceiras	1	6^{5}
