= 2014 KPIT MSLTA Challenger – Doubles =

Doubles
- 2014 KPIT MSLTA Challenger

Final
- Champions: (India) Saketh Myneni (India) Sanam Singh
- Runners-up: (Thailand) Sanchai Ratiwatana (Thailand) Sonchat Ratiwatana
- Score: 6–3, 6–2

Events
Singles	Doubles
KPIT MSLTA Challenger	· 2015 →

This was the first edition of the tournament.

Saketh Myneni and Sanam Singh won the title, defeating Sanchai Ratiwatana and Sonchat Ratiwatana in the final, 6–3, 6–2.

== Seeds ==
1. (Thailand) Sanchai Ratiwatana / (Thailand) Sonchat Ratiwatana (final)
2. (India) Yuki Bhambri / (India) Divij Sharan (quarterfinals)
3. (Philippines) Ruben Gonzales / (India) Purav Raja (first round)
4. (Spain) Adrián Menéndez-Maceiras / (Kazakhstan) Aleksandr Nedovyesov (first round)

== Draw ==
=== Key ===
- Q = Qualifier
- WC = Wild card
- LL = Lucky loser
- Alt = Alternate
- SE = Special exempt
- PR = Protected ranking
- ITF = ITF entry
- JE = Junior exempt
- w/o = Walkover
- r = Retired
- d = Defaulted
- SR = Special ranking

First round
1	(Thailand) Sa Ratiwatana (Thailand) So Ratiwatana	6	6
(Japan) H Moriya (Thailand) D Udomchoke	4	3
(India) S Balaji (India) R Virali-Murugesan	2	3
WC	(India) S Devvarman (India) VS Prashanth	6	6
4	(Spain) A Menéndez-Maceiras (Kazakhstan) A Nedovyesov	4	6	[7]
(Germany) R Becker (Russia) A Kudryavtsev	6	4	[10]
(Belgium) G Gigounon (France) F Martin	6^{4}	7	[10]
WC	(India) A Kadhe (India) R Ramanathan	7^{7}	5	[7]
(Chinese Taipei) H-h Lee (Japan) Y Sugita	3	6^{3}
(Chinese Taipei) T Chen (Chinese Taipei) L-c Huang	6	7^{7}
(Japan) T Matsui (Japan) Y Uchiyama	6	6^{4}	[11]
3	(Philippines) R Gonzales (India) P Raja	4	7^{7}	[9]
(Italy) R Ghedin (Belgium) Y Reuter	0	1
(India) S Myneni (India) S Singh	6	6
WC	(India) J Nedunchezhiyan (India) V Vardhan	7^{8}	6^{4}	[7]
2	(India) Y Bhambri (India) D Sharan	6^{6}	7^{7}	[10]

Quarterfinals
1	(Thailand) Sa Ratiwatana (Thailand) So Ratiwatana	7^{7}	6
WC	(India) S Devvarman (India) VS Prashanth	6^{4}	3
(Germany) R Becker (Russia) A Kudryavtsev	6^{5}	4
(Belgium) G Gigounon (France) F Martin	7^{7}	6
(Chinese Taipei) T Chen (Chinese Taipei) L-c Huang	6^{6}	3
(Japan) T Matsui (Japan) Y Uchiyama	7^{8}	6
(India) S Myneni (India) S Singh	7^{7}	6
(India) Y Bhambri (India) D Sharan	6^{2}	2

Semifinals
1	(Thailand) Sa Ratiwatana (Thailand) So Ratiwatana	6	6
(Belgium) G Gigounon (France) F Martin	4	4
(Japan) T Matsui (Japan) Y Uchiyama	2	7	[7]
(India) S Myneni (India) S Singh	6	5	[10]

Final
1	(Thailand) Sa Ratiwatana (Thailand) So Ratiwatana	3	2
(India) S Myneni (India) S Singh	6	6
