= 2015 KPIT MSLTA Challenger =

- Date: 26–31 October
- Edition: 2nd
- Draw: 32S / 16D
- Prize money: $50,000
- Surface: Hard
- Location: Shree Shiv Chhatrapati Sports Complex, Pune, India

Champions

Singles
- (India) Yuki Bhambri

Doubles
- (Spain) Gerard Granollers / (Spain) Adrián Menéndez Maceiras
← 2014 ·	KPIT MSLTA Challenger	· 2016 →

The 2015 KPIT MSLTA Challenger was a professional tennis tournament played on hard courts. It was the second edition of the tournament which was part of the 2015 ATP Challenger Tour. It took place at Shree Shiv Chhatrapati Sports Complex in Pune, India from 26 to 31 October 2015.

== Singles main-draw entrants ==
=== Seeds ===
Country	Player	Rank^{1}	Seed
IND	Yuki Bhambri	99	1
RUS	Evgeny Donskoy	118	2
ESP	Adrián Menéndez Maceiras	137	3
GBR	James Ward	159	4
IND	Saketh Myneni	166	5
IND	Somdev Devvarman	181	6
BEL	Yannick Mertens	183	7
RUS	Alexander Kudryavtsev	190	8

- ^{1} Rankings are as of 19 October 2015.

=== Other entrants ===
The following players received wildcards into the singles main draw:

- (India) Anvit Bendre
- (India) Aryan Goveas
- (India) Sumit Nagal
- (India) Vishnu Vardhan

The following players received entry from the qualifying draw:

- (India) Prajnesh Gunneswaran
- (Uzbekistan) Temur Ismailov
- (India) Ranjeet Virali-Murugesan
- (India) Purav Raja

== Champions ==
=== Singles ===
- (India) Yuki Bhambri def. (Russia) Evgeny Donskoy 6–2, 7–6^{(7–4)}

=== Doubles ===
- (Spain) Gerard Granollers / (Spain) Adrián Menéndez Maceiras def. (Austria) Maximilian Neuchrist / (India) Divij Sharan 1–6, 6–3, [10–6]
