= 2019 KPIT MSLTA Challenger – Singles =

Singles
- 2019 KPIT MSLTA Challenger

Final
- Champion: (Australia) James Duckworth
- Runner-up: (United Kingdom) Jay Clarke
- Score: 4–6, 6–4, 6–4

Events
Singles	Doubles
- KPIT MSLTA Challenger

Elias Ymer was the defending champion but chose not to defend his title.

James Duckworth won the title after defeating Jay Clarke 4–6, 6–4, 6–4 in the final.

== Seeds ==
All seeds receive a bye into the second round.

1. (India) Prajnesh Gunneswaran (third round)
2. (Australia) James Duckworth (champion)
3. (India) Sumit Nagal (quarterfinals)
4. (Canada) Steven Diez (quarterfinals)
5. (United Kingdom) Jay Clarke (final)
6. (India) Ramkumar Ramanathan (semifinals)
7. (Spain) Roberto Ortega Olmedo (semifinals)
8. (India) Sasikumar Mukund (quarterfinals)
9. (South Korea) Lee Duck-hee (third round)
10. (India) Saketh Myneni (second round)
11. (Japan) Shuichi Sekiguchi (third round)
12. (Turkey) Cem İlkel (third round)
13. (Russia) Ivan Nedelko (third round, retired)
14. (Netherlands) Tim van Rijthoven (quarterfinals, retired)
15. (United Kingdom) Brydan Klein (third round)
16. (Japan) Rio Noguchi (second round)

== Draw ==
Key

- Q = Qualifier
- WC = Wild card
- LL = Lucky loser
- Alt = Alternate
- ITF = ITF entry
- PR = Protected ranking
- SR = Special ranking
- SE = Special exempt
- JE = Junior exempt
- JR = Junior Accelerator Programme entrant
- CO = College Accelerator Programme entrant
- NG = Next Gen Accelerator Program entrant
- w/o = Walkover
- r = Retired
- d = Defaulted

=== Finals ===
Quarterfinals
14	(Netherlands) Tim van Rijthoven	6^{7}	0^{r}
7	(Spain) Roberto Ortega Olmedo	7^{9}	0
4	(Canada) Steven Diez	4	6	6^{3}
5	(United Kingdom) Jay Clarke	6	3	7^{7}
6	(India) Ramkumar Ramanathan	6	7^{7}
3	(India) Sumit Nagal	4	6^{5}
8	(India) Sasikumar Mukund	5	6	5
2	(Australia) James Duckworth	7	4	7

Semifinals
7	(Spain) Roberto Ortega Olmedo	3	2
5	(United Kingdom) Jay Clarke	6	6
6	(India) Ramkumar Ramanathan	6^{8}	2
2	(Australia) James Duckworth	7^{10}	6

Final
5	(United Kingdom) Jay Clarke	6	4	4
2	(Australia) James Duckworth	4	6	6

=== Top half ===
==== Section 1 ====
First round
WC	(United States) Dhruva Mulye	1	3
(India) C Sood	6	6
Q	(India) Dalwinder Singh	6	6
(India) Kunal Anand	3	4
WC	(India) L Sood	4	2
(Russia) Roman Blokhin	6	6
(Kazakhstan) T Khabibulin	6	4	3
(India) A Chandrasekar	4	6	6

Second round
1	(India) P Gunneswaran	6	6
(India) C Sood	1	3
Q	(India) D Singh	3	1
14	(Netherlands) T van Rijthoven	6	6
11	(Japan) Shuichi Sekiguchi	6	6
(Russia) R Blokhin	3	0
(India) A Chandrasekar	3	2
7	(Spain) R Ortega Olmedo	6	6

Third round
1	(India) P Gunneswaran	6	5	3
14	(Netherlands) T van Rijthoven	4	7	6
11	(Japan) S Sekiguchi	2	4
7	(Spain) R Ortega Olmedo	6	6

Quarterfinals
14	(Netherlands) T van Rijthoven	6^{7}	0^{r}
7	(Spain) R Ortega Olmedo	7^{9}	0

==== Section 2 ====
First round
(India) Siddharth Vishwakarma	0	6	3
(Japan) Y Takahashi	6	3	6
(India) Sidharth Rawat	6	3	6
(India) A Kadhe	2	6	3
(Tunisia) A Dougaz	6	7^{7}
(India) A Kalyanpur	3	6^{3}
(Russia) B Bobrov	1	4
(France) C Hemery	6	6

Second round
4	(Canada) S Diez	6	6
(Japan) Y Takahashi	2	2
(India) S Rawat	1	6	4
15	(United Kingdom) B Klein	6	3	6
9	(South Korea) D-h Lee	6	6
(Tunisia) A Dougaz	3	4
(France) C Hemery	4	4
5	(United Kingdom) J Clarke	6	6

Third round
4	(Canada) S Diez	6	6
15	(United Kingdom) B Klein	0	2
9	(South Korea) D-h Lee	1	4
5	(United Kingdom) J Clarke	6	6

Quarterfinals
4	(Canada) S Diez	4	6	6^{3}
5	(United Kingdom) J Clarke	6	3	7^{7}

=== Bottom half ===
==== Section 3 ====
First round
(Greece) M Kalovelonis	6	6
(India) VS Prashanth	2	4
Alt	(India) Vinayak Sharma Kaza	7^{7}	6^{5}	6
Q	(India) Tejas Chaukulkar	6^{1}	7^{7}	4
WC	(India) Dhruv Sunish	7^{7}	6
(Japan) Daisuke Sumizawa	6^{3}	2
(Germany) Tobias Simon	4	6^{4}
WC	(India) Aryan Goveas	6	7^{7}

Second round
6	(India) R Ramanathan	6	6
(Greece) M Kalovelonis	3	4
Alt	(India) VS Kaza	2	1
12	(Turkey) C İlkel	6	6
13	(Russia) I Nedelko	6	5	6
WC	(India) D Sunish	3	7	2
WC	(India) A Goveas	3	6^{5}
3	(India) S Nagal	6	7^{7}

Third round
6	(India) R Ramanathan	6	6
12	(Turkey) C İlkel	3	4
13	(Russia) I Nedelko	0^{r}
3	(India) S Nagal	2

Quarterfinals
6	(India) R Ramanathan	6	7^{7}
3	(India) S Nagal	4	6^{5}

==== Section 4 ====
First round
(Israel) B Patael	6	3	4
(Japan) T Matsui	4	6	6
(Turkey) E Kırkın	1	7	6
(Austria) D Pichler	6	5	2
(India) Manish Sureshkumar	6	6
WC	(India) Anvit Bendre	2	0
(India) N Kaliyanda Poonacha	6^{3}	3
(Ukraine) D Kalenichenko	7^{7}	6

Second round
8	(India) S Mukund	6	6
(Japan) T Matsui	2	3
(Turkey) E Kırkın	3	7	6
10	(India) S Myneni	6	5	4
16	(Japan) R Noguchi	3	6^{4}
(India) M Sureshkumar	6	7^{7}
(Ukraine) D Kalenichenko	3	6^{3}
2	(Australia) J Duckworth	6	7^{7}

Third round
8	(India) S Mukund	6	6
(Turkey) E Kırkın	0	2
(India) M Sureshkumar	1	2
2	(Australia) J Duckworth	6	6

Quarterfinals
8	(India) S Mukund	5	6	5
2	(Australia) J Duckworth	7	4	7
