= 2016 KPIT MSLTA Challenger =

- Date: 24–30 October
- Edition: 3rd
- Draw: 32S / 16D
- Prize money: $50,000
- Surface: Hard
- Location: Shree Shiv Chhatrapati Sports Complex, Pune, India

Champions

Singles
- (France) Sadio Doumbia

Doubles
- (India) Purav Raja / (India) Divij Sharan
← 2015 ·	KPIT MSLTA Challenger	· 2017 →

The 2016 KPIT MSLTA Challenger was a professional tennis tournament played on hard courts. It was the third edition of the tournament which was part of the 2016 ATP Challenger Tour. It took place at Shree Shiv Chhatrapati Sports Complex in Pune, India from 24 to 30 October 2016.

== Singles main-draw entrants ==
=== Seeds ===
Country	Player	Rank^{1}	Seed
RUS	Evgeny Donskoy	102	1
KOR	Lee Duck-hee	156	2
IND	Saketh Myneni	186	3
ESP	Adrián Menéndez Maceiras	208	4
IND	Ramkumar Ramanathan	226	5
SRB	Nikola Milojević	232	6
KAZ	Dmitry Popko	240	7
IND	Prajnesh Gunneswaran	329	8

- ^{1} Rankings are as of 17 October 2016.

=== Other entrants ===
The following players received wildcards into the singles main draw:

- (Spain) Adrián Menéndez Maceiras
- (India) Jayesh Pungliya
- (India) Dhruv Sunish
- (India) Vishnu Vardhan

The following players received entry from the qualifying draw:

- (Ukraine) Marat Deviatiarov
- (Switzerland) Luca Margaroli
- (France) Hugo Nys
- (India) Ranjeet Virali-Murugesan

== Champions ==
=== Singles ===
- (France) Sadio Doumbia def. (India) Prajnesh Gunneswaran, 4–6, 6–4, 6–3.

=== Doubles ===
- (India) Purav Raja / (India) Divij Sharan def. (Switzerland) Luca Margaroli / (France) Hugo Nys, 3–6, 6–3, [11–9].
