= 2018 KPIT MSLTA Challenger =

- Date: 19–24 November
- Edition: 5th
- Draw: 32S / 16D
- Surface: Hard
- Location: Shree Shiv Chhatrapati Sports Complex, Pune, India

Champions

Singles
- (Sweden) Elias Ymer

Doubles
- (India) Vijay Sundar Prashanth / (India) Ramkumar Ramanathan
← 2017 ·	KPIT MSLTA Challenger	· 2019 →

The 2018 KPIT MSLTA Challenger was a professional tennis tournament played on hard courts. It was the fifth edition of the tournament which was part of the 2018 ATP Challenger Tour. It took place in Pune, India from 19 to 24 November 2018.

== Singles main-draw entrants ==
=== Seeds ===
Country	Player	Rank^{1}	Seed
MDA	Radu Albot	101	1
IND	Ramkumar Ramanathan	124	2
SWE	Elias Ymer	132	3
IND	Prajnesh Gunneswaran	144	4
AUS	Marc Polmans	145	5
GBR	Jay Clarke	174	6
SVK	Andrej Martin	189	7
GBR	James Ward	199	8

- ^{1} Rankings are as of 12 November 2018.

=== Other entrants ===
The following players received wildcards into the singles main draw:

- (India) Aryan Goveas
- (India) Arjun Kadhe
- (India) Sasikumar Mukund
- (India) Manish Sureshkumar

The following player received entry into the singles main draw as a special exempt:

- (India) Saketh Myneni

The following player received entry into the singles main draw as an alternate:

- (Spain) Nicola Kuhn

The following players received entry from the qualifying draw:

- (Germany) Sebastian Fanselow
- (Germany) Lucas Gerch
- (Israel) Ben Patael
- (Italy) Francesco Vilardo

The following player received entry as a lucky loser:

- (Germany) Benjamin Hassan

== Champions ==
=== Singles ===
- (Sweden) Elias Ymer def. (India) Prajnesh Gunneswaran 6–2, 7–5.

=== Doubles ===
- (India) Vijay Sundar Prashanth / (India) Ramkumar Ramanathan def. (Chinese Taipei) Hsieh Cheng-peng / (Chinese Taipei) Yang Tsung-hua 7–6^{(7–3)}, 6–7^{(5–7)}, [10–7].
