= 2023 Pune Challenger =

- Date: 27 February – 6 March
- Edition: 7th
- Surface: Hard
- Location: Shree Shiv Chhatrapati Sports Complex, Pune, India

Champions

Singles
- (Australia) Max Purcell

Doubles
- (India) Anirudh Chandrasekar / (India) Vijay Sundar Prashanth
← 2019 ·	Pune Challenger	· 2024 →

The 2023 Pune Challenger was a professional tennis tournament played on hard courts. It was the seventh edition of the tournament which was part of the 2023 ATP Challenger Tour. It took place in Pune, India from 27 February to 6 March 2023.

== Singles main-draw entrants ==
=== Seeds ===
Country	Player	Rank^{1}	Seed
AUS	James Duckworth	128	1
TPE	Tseng Chun-hsin	131	2
AUS	Max Purcell	155	3
ITA	Luca Nardi	158	4
ITA	Francesco Maestrelli	178	5
CZE	Dalibor Svrčina	181	6
TPE	Hsu Yu-hsiou	206	7
JPN	Rio Noguchi	210	8

- ^{1} Rankings are as of 20 February 2023.

=== Other entrants ===
The following players received wildcards into the singles main draw:

- (India) Arjun Kadhe
- (India) Sumit Nagal
- (India) Mukund Sasikumar

The following player received entry into the singles main draw using a protected ranking:

- (Australia) Marc Polmans

The following players received entry into the singles main draw as alternates:

- (India) Prajnesh Gunneswaran
- (Japan) Hiroki Moriya

The following players received entry from the qualifying draw:

- (South Korea) Chung Yun-seong
- (Zimbabwe) Benjamin Lock
- (Serbia) Nikola Milojević
- (Japan) Makoto Ochi
- (Czech Republic) Dominik Palán
- (Australia) Akira Santillan

The following player received entry as a lucky loser:

- (United Kingdom) Jay Clarke

== Champions ==
=== Singles ===
- (Australia) Max Purcell def. (Italy) Luca Nardi 6–2, 6–3.

=== Doubles ===
- (India) Anirudh Chandrasekar / (India) Vijay Sundar Prashanth def. (Japan) Toshihide Matsui / (Japan) Kaito Uesugi 6–1, 4–6, [10–3].
