= 2026 Pune Challenger =

- Date: 23 February – 1 March
- Edition: 10th
- Surface: Hard
- Location: Pune, India

Champions

Singles
- (Italy) Federico Cinà

Doubles
- (South Korea) Nam Ji-sung / (Finland) Patrik Niklas-Salminen
- Pune Challenger

The 2026 Pune Challenger was a professional tennis tournament played on hardcourts. It was the tenth edition of the tournament which was part of the 2026 ATP Challenger Tour. It took place in Pune, India from 23 February to 1 March 2026.

== Singles main-draw entrants ==
=== Seeds ===
Country	Player	Rank^{1}	Seed
ARG	Federico Agustín Gómez	182	1
GBR	Jay Clarke	185	2
	Ilia Simakin	214	3
GBR	Oliver Crawford	215	4
POR	Frederico Ferreira Silva	224	5
ITA	Federico Cinà	225	6
JPN	Rio Noguchi	250	7
LTU	Edas Butvilas	254	8

- ^{1} Rankings are as of 16 February 2026.

=== Other entrants ===
The following players received wildcards into the singles main draw:

- (India) Manas Dhamne
- (India) Karan Singh
- (India) Aditya Vishal Balsekar

The following player received entry into the singles main draw using a protected ranking:

- Ilya Ivashka

The following player received entry into the singles main draw through the Next Gen Accelerator programme:

- (Italy) Lorenzo Carboni

The following players received entry from the qualifying draw:

- (Japan) Masamichi Imamura
- (Poland) Maks Kaśnikowski
- (Japan) Takuya Kumasaka
- (Malaysia) Mitsuki Wei Kang Leong
- (Japan) Yusuke Takahashi
- (Chinese Taipei) Wu Tung-lin

The following players received entry as lucky losers:

- (Italy) Alexandr Binda
- (Chinese Taipei) Huang Tsung-hao
- (Spain) David Jordà Sanchis

== Champions ==
=== Singles ===
- (Italy) Federico Cinà def. (United Kingdom) Felix Gill 6–3, 5–7, 7–6^{(7–1)}.

=== Doubles ===
- (South Korea) Nam Ji-sung / (Finland) Patrik Niklas-Salminen def. (Thailand) Pruchya Isaro / (India) Niki Kaliyanda Poonacha 6–4, 6–7^{(1–7)}, [10–7].
