= 2026 Pune Challenger – Singles =

Singles
- 2026 Pune Challenger

Final
- Champion: (Italy) Federico Cinà
- Runner-up: (United Kingdom) Felix Gill
- Score: 6–3, 5–7, 7–6^{(7–1)}

Events
Singles	Doubles
- Pune Challenger

Dalibor Svrčina was the defending champion but chose not to defend his title.

Federico Cinà won the title after defeating Felix Gill 6–3, 5–7, 7–6^{(7–1)} in the final.

== Seeds ==
1. (Argentina) Federico Agustín Gómez (first round)
2. (United Kingdom) Jay Clarke (second round)
3. Ilia Simakin (second round)
4. (United Kingdom) Oliver Crawford (second round, withdrew)
5. (Portugal) Frederico Ferreira Silva (second round)
6. (Italy) Federico Cinà (champion)
7. (Japan) Rio Noguchi (first round)
8. (Lithuania) Edas Butvilas (semifinals)

== Draw ==
Key

- Q = Qualifier
- WC = Wild card
- LL = Lucky loser
- Alt = Alternate
- ITF = ITF entry
- PR = Protected ranking
- SR = Special ranking
- SE = Special exempt
- JE = Junior exempt
- JR = Junior Accelerator Programme entrant
- CO = College Accelerator Programme entrant
- NG = Next Gen Accelerator Program entrant
- w/o = Walkover
- r = Retired
- d = Defaulted

=== Finals ===
Semifinals
(Croatia) Duje Ajduković	5	2
6	(Italy) Federico Cinà	7	6
(United Kingdom) Felix Gill	6	7
8	(Lithuania) Edas Butvilas	4	5

Final
6	(Italy) Federico Cinà	6	5	7^{7}
(United Kingdom) Felix Gill	3	7	6^{1}

=== Top half ===
First round
1	(Argentina) FA Gómez	4	6	6^{7}
PR	I Ivashka	6	1	7^{9}
WC	(India) M Dhamne	6	7^{7}
(Greece) S Sakellaridis	4	6^{4}
(Croatia) D Ajduković	6	6
(South Korea) Shin San-hui	2	4
P Bar Biryukov	3	4
5	(Portugal) F Ferreira Silva	6	6
3	I Simakin	4	6	7^{12}
Q	(Malaysia) Mitsuki Wei Kang Leong	6	2	6^{10}
(United Kingdom) A Gray	6	3	6
(Poland) D Michalski	3	6	3
NG	(Italy) Lorenzo Carboni	4	4
(Japan) Y Shimizu	6	6
Q	(Japan) Takuya Kumasaka	1	0
6	(Italy) F Cinà	6	6

Second round
PR	I Ivashka	3	0^{r}
WC	(India) M Dhamne	6	0
(Croatia) D Ajduković	6	6
5	(Portugal) F Ferreira Silva	2	2
3	I Simakin	6	6^{7}	5
(United Kingdom) A Gray	4	7^{9}	7
(Japan) Y Shimizu	1	4
6	(Italy) F Cinà	6	6

Quarterfinals
WC	(India) M Dhamne	6	6^{8}	4
(Croatia) D Ajduković	3	7^{10}	6
(United Kingdom) A Gray	4	2
6	(Italy) F Cinà	6	6

Semifinals
(Croatia) D Ajduković	5	2
6	(Italy) F Cinà	7	6

=== Bottom half ===
First round
7	(Japan) R Noguchi	1	2
(India) S Nagal	6	6
(Belgium) M Geerts	6	6^{9}	4
(United Kingdom) F Gill	1	7^{11}	6
Q	(Poland) M Kaśnikowski	6	6
WC	(India) K Singh	3	1
LL	(Chinese Taipei) T-h Huang	2	6	0
4	(United Kingdom) O Crawford	6	4	6
8	(Lithuania) E Butvilas	6	6
WC	(India) Aditya Vishal Balsekar	0	1
Q	(Chinese Taipei) T-l Wu	6	6
LL	(Italy) A Binda	1	2
LL	(Spain) D Jordà Sanchis	6^{8}	4
Q	(Japan) M Imamura	7^{10}	6
Q	(Japan) Y Takahashi	4	1
2	(United Kingdom) J Clarke	6	6

Second round
(India) S Nagal	6^{4}	6	3
(United Kingdom) F Gill	7^{7}	0	6
Q	(Poland) M Kaśnikowski	w/o
4	(United Kingdom) O Crawford
8	(Lithuania) E Butvilas	6	3
Q	(Chinese Taipei) T-l Wu	3	0^{r}
Q	(Japan) M Imamura	6	6
2	(United Kingdom) J Clarke	2	4

Quarterfinals
(United Kingdom) F Gill	0	7^{7}	6
Q	(Poland) M Kaśnikowski	6	6^{2}	1
8	(Lithuania) E Butvilas	6	6
Q	(Japan) M Imamura	3	3

Semifinals
(United Kingdom) F Gill	6	7
8	(Lithuania) E Butvilas	4	5
