= 2017 KPIT MSLTA Challenger =

- Date: 13–18 November
- Edition: 4th
- Draw: 32S / 16D
- Surface: Hard
- Location: Shree Shiv Chhatrapati Sports Complex, Pune, India

Champions

Singles
- (India) Yuki Bhambri

Doubles
- (Bosnia and Herzegovina) Tomislav Brkić / (Croatia) Ante Pavić
← 2016 ·	KPIT MSLTA Challenger	· 2018 →

The 2017 KPIT MSLTA Challenger was a professional tennis tournament played on hard courts. It was the fourth edition of the tournament which was part of the 2017 ATP Challenger Tour. It took place in Pune, India from 13 to 18 November 2017.

== Singles main-draw entrants ==
=== Seeds ===
Country	Player	Rank^{1}	Seed
SLO	Blaž Kavčič	98	1
ESP	Adrián Menéndez Maceiras	130	2
IND	Yuki Bhambri	140	3
IND	Ramkumar Ramanathan	148	4
SRB	Nikola Milojević	156	5
~~SWE~~	~~Elias Ymer~~	~~183~~	~~6~~
USA	Evan King	197	7
SRB	Peđa Krstin	216	8
KAZ	Aleksandr Nedovyesov	227	9

- ^{1} Rankings are as of 6 November 2017.

=== Other entrants ===
The following players received wildcards into the singles main draw:

- (India) Aryan Goveas
- (India) Arjun Kadhe
- (India) Saketh Myneni
- (India) Vishnu Vardhan

The following players received entry from the qualifying draw:

- (France) Antoine Escoffier
- (Croatia) Borna Gojo
- (France) Hugo Grenier
- (Japan) Kaichi Uchida

The following player received entry as a lucky loser:

- (India) Vijay Sundar Prashanth

== Champions ==
=== Singles ===
- (India) Yuki Bhambri def. (India) Ramkumar Ramanathan 4–6, 6–3, 6–4.

=== Doubles ===
- (Bosnia and Herzegovina) Tomislav Brkić / (Croatia) Ante Pavić def. (Spain) Pedro Martínez / (Spain) Adrián Menéndez Maceiras 6–1, 7–6^{(7–5)}.
