= 2025 Pune Challenger – Singles =

Singles
- 2025 Pune Challenger

Final
- Champion: (Czech Republic) Dalibor Svrčina
- Runner-up: (United States) Brandon Holt
- Score: 7–6^{(7–3)}, 6–1

Events
Singles	Doubles
- Pune Challenger

Valentin Vacherot was the defending champion but lost in the quarterfinals to Alexis Galarneau.

Dalibor Svrčina won the title after defeating Brandon Holt 7–6^{(7–3)}, 6–1 in the final.

== Seeds ==
1. (United Kingdom) Billy Harris (quarterfinals)
2. (Czech Republic) Vít Kopřiva (withdrew)
3. (Australia) Tristan Schoolkate (first round)
4. (Denmark) Elmer Møller (first round)
5. (France) Ugo Blanchet (quarterfinals)
6. (United States) Brandon Holt (final)
7. (Japan) Shintaro Mochizuki (first round)
8. (Canada) Alexis Galarneau (semifinals)

== Draw ==
Key

- Q = Qualifier
- WC = Wild card
- LL = Lucky loser
- Alt = Alternate
- ITF = ITF entry
- PR = Protected ranking
- SR = Special ranking
- SE = Special exempt
- JE = Junior exempt
- JR = Junior Accelerator Programme entrant
- CO = College Accelerator Programme entrant
- NG = Next Gen Accelerator Program entrant
- w/o = Walkover
- r = Retired
- d = Defaulted

=== Finals ===
Semifinals
6	(United States) Brandon Holt	7	6
8	(Canada) Alexis Galarneau	5	4
(Uzbekistan) Khumoyun Sultanov	7^{10}	0	1^{r}
(Czech Republic) Dalibor Svrčina	6^{8}	6	3

Final
6	(United States) Brandon Holt	6^{3}	1
(Czech Republic) Dalibor Svrčina	7^{7}	6

=== Top half ===
First round
1	(United Kingdom) B Harris	6	6
WC	(India) M Dhamne	4	4
Q	(Belgium) K Coppejans	6^{5}	5
Q	(Japan) H Moriya	7^{7}	7
Q	P Bar Biryukov	6^{6}	7	3
(France) S Gueymard Wayenburg	7^{8}	5	6
WC	(India) Aryan Shah	2	2
6	(United States) B Holt	6	6
4	(Denmark) E Møller	7	2	4
(Monaco) V Vacherot	5	6	6
Alt	(United Kingdom) J Clarke	6^{2}	2
Q	(Japan) M Imamura	7^{7}	6
Q	(Belgium) M Geerts	4	6	7^{7}
(Czech Republic) M Gengel	6	1	6^{4}
WC	(India) K Singh	4	1
8	(Canada) A Galarneau	6	6

Second round
1	(United Kingdom) B Harris	7	6
Q	(Japan) H Moriya	5	3
(France) S Gueymard Wayenburg	4	4
6	(United States) B Holt	6	6
(Monaco) V Vacherot	6	6
Q	(Japan) M Imamura	2	3
Q	(Belgium) M Geerts	4	4
8	(Canada) A Galarneau	6	6

Quarterfinals
1	(United Kingdom) B Harris	6	3	4
6	(United States) B Holt	4	6	6
(Monaco) V Vacherot	6	3	6^{3}
8	(Canada) A Galarneau	3	6	7^{7}

Semifinals
6	(United States) B Holt	7	6
8	(Canada) A Galarneau	5	4

=== Bottom half ===
First round
5	(France) U Blanchet	3	6	6
(France) E Couacaud	6	2	3
(Japan) R Noguchi	1	3
Alt	(France) K Jacquet	6	6
(Colombia) N Mejía	2	2
(Australia) B Tomic	6	6
(Uzbekistan) K Sultanov	6	4	6
3	(Australia) T Schoolkate	3	6	3
7	(Japan) S Mochizuki	7^{7}	1	2
(Austria) J Rodionov	6^{5}	6	6
(Denmark) A Holmgren	6	3	5
(Czech Republic) D Svrčina	4	6	7
Alt	(Italy) E Dalla Valle	0	3
(Australia) J McCabe	6	6
Q	I Simakin	6	6
LL	(Australia) B Ellis	4	2

Second round
5	(France) U Blanchet	2	6	6
Alt	(France) K Jacquet	6	3	1
(Australia) B Tomic	6	3	3
(Uzbekistan) K Sultanov	4	6	6
(Austria) J Rodionov	4	5
(Czech Republic) D Svrčina	6	7
(Australia) J McCabe	2	4
Q	I Simakin	6	6

Quarterfinals
5	(France) U Blanchet	0	2
(Uzbekistan) K Sultanov	6	6
(Czech Republic) D Svrčina	6	6
Q	I Simakin	1	3

Semifinals
(Uzbekistan) K Sultanov	7^{10}	0	1^{r}
(Czech Republic) D Svrčina	6^{8}	6	3
