= 2024 Pune Challenger =

- Date: 19 – 25 February
- Edition: 8th
- Surface: Hard
- Location: Shree Shiv Chhatrapati Sports Complex, Pune, India

Champions

Singles
- (Monaco) Valentin Vacherot

Doubles
- (Australia) Tristan Schoolkate / (Australia) Adam Walton
- Pune Challenger

The 2024 Pune Challenger, known as the PMRDA (Pune Metropolitan Region Development Authority) Powered Maha Open, was a professional tennis tournament played on hardcourts. It was the eighth edition of the tournament which was part of the 2024 ATP Challenger Tour. It took place in Pune, India from 19 to 25 February 2024.

== Singles main-draw entrants ==
=== Seeds ===
Country	Player	Rank^{1}	Seed
IND	Sumit Nagal	98	1
CRO	Duje Ajduković	125	2
AUS	Adam Walton	153	3
MON	Valentin Vacherot	173	4
CZE	Dalibor Svrčina	174	5
GBR	Oliver Crawford	190	6
AUS	Dane Sweeny	194	7
ITA	Federico Gaio	202	8

- ^{1} Rankings are as of 12 February 2024.

=== Other entrants ===
The following players received wildcards into the singles main draw:

- (India) Niki Kaliyanda Poonacha
- (India) Ramkumar Ramanathan
- (India) Mukund Sasikumar

The following player received entry into the singles main draw as an alternate:

- (Australia) Philip Sekulic

The following players received entry from the qualifying draw:

- (Belgium) Raphaël Collignon
- (Germany) Sebastian Fanselow
- (United Kingdom) Felix Gill
- (Canada) Vasek Pospisil
- (Australia) Bernard Tomic
- Alexey Zakharov

== Champions ==
=== Singles ===
- (Monaco) Valentin Vacherot def. (Australia) Adam Walton 3–6, 7–6^{(7–5)}, 7–6^{(7–5)}.

=== Doubles ===
- (Australia) Tristan Schoolkate / (Australia) Adam Walton def. (France) Dan Added / (South Korea) Chung Yun-seong 7–6^{(7–4)}, 7–5.
