= 2014 KPIT MSLTA Challenger =

- Date: 20–25 October
- Edition: 1st
- Draw: 32S / 16D
- Prize money: $50,000
- Surface: Hard
- Location: Shree Shiv Chhatrapati Sports Complex, Pune, India

Champions

Singles
- (Japan) Yūichi Sugita

Doubles
- (India) Saketh Myneni / (India) Sanam Singh
KPIT MSLTA Challenger	· 2015 →

The 2014 KPIT MSLTA Challenger was a professional tennis tournament played on hard courts. It was the inaugural edition of the tournament which was part of the 2014 ATP Challenger Tour. It took place at Shree Shiv Chhatrapati Sports Complex in Pune, India from 20 to 25 October 2014.

== Singles main-draw entrants ==
=== Seeds ===
Country	Player	Rank^{1}	Seed
KAZ	Aleksandr Nedovyesov	118	1
RUS	Alexander Kudryavtsev	125	2
IND	Somdev Devvarman	143	3
JPN	Yūichi Sugita	146	4
JPN	Hiroki Moriya	154	5
ESP	Adrián Menéndez Maceiras	162	6
IND	Yuki Bhambri	183	7
BEL	Kimmer Coppejans	202	8

- ^{1} Rankings are as of 12 October 2014.

=== Other entrants ===
The following players received wildcards into the singles main draw:

- (India) Arjun Kadhe
- (India) Sasikumar Mukund
- (India) Sidharth Rawat
- (India) Vishnu Vardhan

The following player entered the draw as special exempts:

- (India) Saketh Myneni

The following players received entry from the qualifying draw:

- (Italy) Riccardo Ghedin
- (Uzbekistan) Sarvar Ikramov
- (India) Vijay Sundar Prashanth
- (India) Purav Raja

The following player entered the draw as alternate:

- (Germany) Richard Becker

== Champions ==
=== Singles ===
- (Japan) Yūichi Sugita def. (Spain) Adrián Menéndez Maceiras 6–7^{(1–7)}, 6–4, 6–4

=== Doubles ===
- (India) Saketh Myneni / (India) Sanam Singh def. (Thailand) Sanchai Ratiwatana / (Thailand) Sonchat Ratiwatana 6–3, 6–2
