= 2025 Pune Challenger =

- Date: 17 – 23 February
- Edition: 9th
- Surface: Hard
- Location: Shree Shiv Chhatrapati Sports Complex, Pune, India

Champions

Singles
- (Czech Republic) Dalibor Svrčina

Doubles
- (India) Jeevan Nedunchezhiyan / (India) Vijay Sundar Prashanth
- Pune Challenger

The 2025 Pune Challenger, known as the PMRDA Powered Maha Open, was a professional tennis tournament played on hardcourts. It was the ninth edition of the tournament which was part of the 2025 ATP Challenger Tour. It took place in Pune, India from 17 to 23 February 2025.

== Singles main-draw entrants ==
=== Seeds ===
Country	Player	Rank^{1}	Seed
GBR	Billy Harris	116	1
~~CZE~~	~~Vít Kopřiva~~	~~127~~	~~2~~
AUS	Tristan Schoolkate	140	3
DEN	Elmer Møller	152	4
FRA	Ugo Blanchet	165	5
USA	Brandon Holt	166	6
JPN	Shintaro Mochizuki	171	7
CAN	Alexis Galarneau	178	8

- ^{1} Rankings are as of 10 February 2025.

=== Other entrants ===
The following players received wildcards into the singles main draw:

- (India) Manas Dhamne
- (India) Aryan Shah
- (India) Karan Singh

The following players received entry into the singles main draw as alternates:

- (United Kingdom) Jay Clarke
- (Italy) Enrico Dalla Valle
- (France) Kyrian Jacquet

The following players received entry from the qualifying draw:

- Petr Bar Biryukov
- (Belgium) Kimmer Coppejans
- (Belgium) Michael Geerts
- (Japan) Masamichi Imamura
- (Japan) Hiroki Moriya
- Ilia Simakin

The following player received entry as a lucky loser:

- (Australia) Blake Ellis

== Champions ==
=== Singles ===
- (Czech Republic) Dalibor Svrčina def. (United States) Brandon Holt 7–6^{(7–3)}, 6–1.

=== Doubles ===
- (India) Jeevan Nedunchezhiyan / (India) Vijay Sundar Prashanth def. (Australia) Blake Bayldon / (Australia) Matthew Romios 3–6, 6–3, [10–0].
