= 2019 KPIT MSLTA Challenger =

- Date: 11–17 November
- Edition: 6th
- Draw: 48S / 16D
- Surface: Hard
- Location: Shree Shiv Chhatrapati Sports Complex, Pune, India

Champions

Singles
- (Australia) James Duckworth

Doubles
- (India) Purav Raja / (India) Ramkumar Ramanathan
| ← 2018 · | KPIT MSLTA Challenger | · 2023 → |

The 2019 KPIT MSLTA Challenger was a professional tennis tournament played on hard courts. It was the sixth edition of the tournament which was part of the 2019 ATP Challenger Tour. It took place in Pune, India from 11 to 17 November 2019.

== Singles main-draw entrants ==
=== Seeds ===
| Country | Player | Rank^{1} | Seed |
|---|---|---|---|
| IND | Prajnesh Gunneswaran | 94 | 1 |
| AUS | James Duckworth | 110 | 2 |
| IND | Sumit Nagal | 129 | 3 |
| CAN | Steven Diez | 136 | 4 |
| GBR | Jay Clarke | 180 | 5 |
| IND | Ramkumar Ramanathan | 199 | 6 |
| ESP | Roberto Ortega Olmedo | 246 | 7 |
| IND | Sasikumar Mukund | 248 | 8 |
| KOR | Lee Duck-hee | 255 | 9 |
| IND | Saketh Myneni | 266 | 10 |
| JPN | Shuichi Sekiguchi | 268 | 11 |
| TUR | Cem İlkel | 272 | 12 |
| RUS | Ivan Nedelko | 321 | 13 |
| NED | Tim van Rijthoven | 386 | 14 |
| GBR | Brydan Klein | 403 | 15 |
| JPN | Rio Noguchi | 407 | 16 |

- ^{1} Rankings are as of 4 November 2019.

=== Other entrants ===
The following players received wildcards into the singles main draw:

- (India) Anvit Bendre
- (India) Aryan Goveas
- (United States) Dhruva Mulye
- (India) Lakshit Sood
- (India) Dhruv Sunish

The following player received entry into the singles main draw as an alternate:

- (India) Vinayak Sharma Kaza

The following players received entry from the qualifying draw:

- (India) Tejas Chaukulkar
- (India) Dalwinder Singh

== Champions ==
=== Singles ===
- (Australia) James Duckworth def. (United Kingdom) Jay Clarke 4–6, 6–4, 6–4.

=== Doubles ===
- (India) Purav Raja / (India) Ramkumar Ramanathan def. (India) Arjun Kadhe / (India) Saketh Myneni 7–6^{(7–3)}, 6–3.
