= Federico Cinà =

Italian tennis player (born 2007)

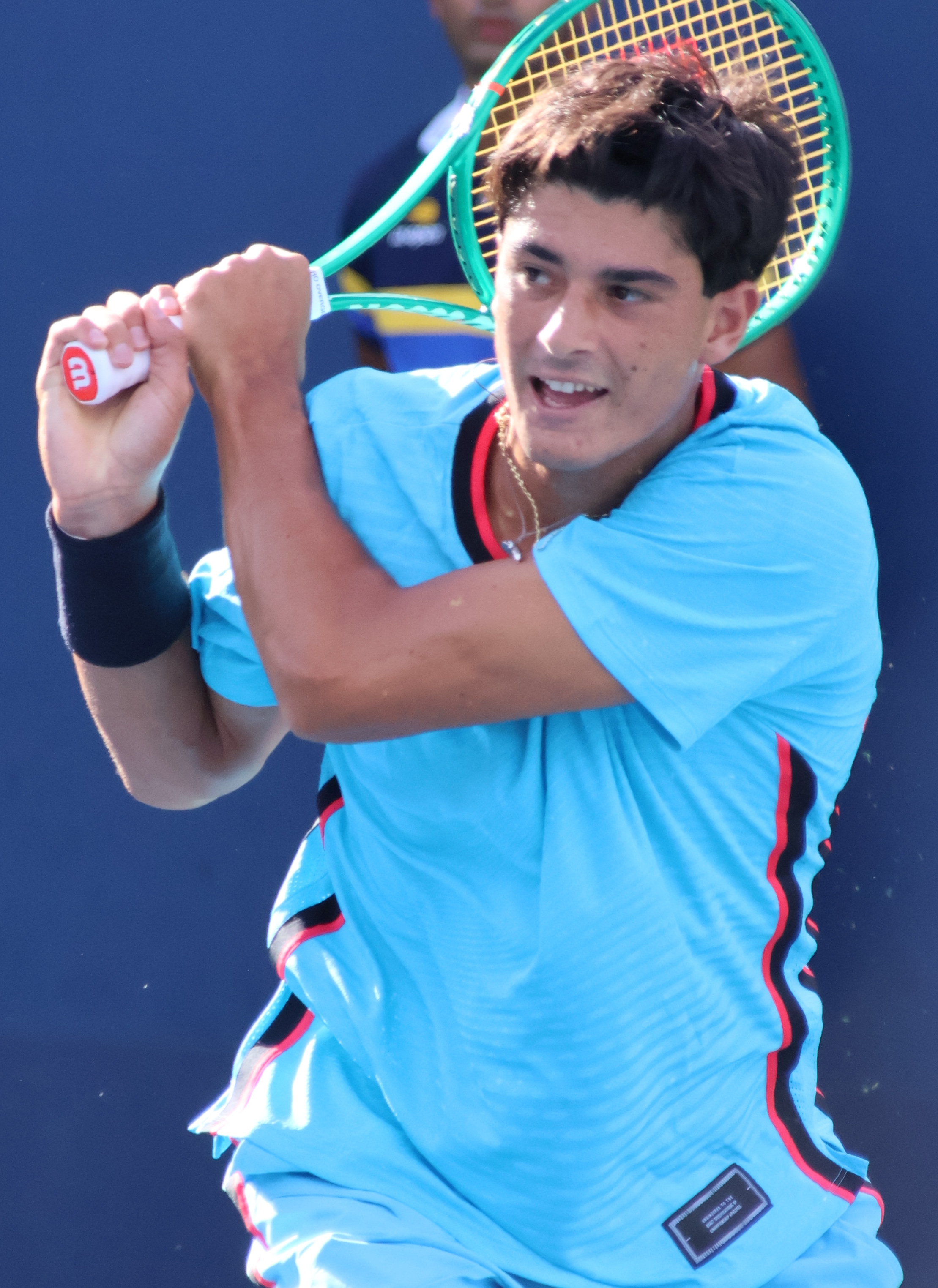
- Cinà at the 2026 US Open
- Country (sports): Italy
- Residence: Palermo, Italy
- Born: 30 March 2007 (age 19) Palermo, Italy
- Height: 1.85 m (6 ft 1 in)
- Turned pro: 2023
- Plays: Right-handed (two-handed backhand)
- Coach: Francesco Cinà
- Prize money: US $778,675

Singles
- Career record: 4–14
- Career titles: 0
- Highest ranking: No. 135 (19 October 2026)
- Current ranking: No. 139 (9 November 2026)

Grand Slam singles results
- Australian Open: Q2 (2026)
- French Open: 2R (2026)
- Wimbledon: Q2 (2026)
- US Open: 1R (2026)

Doubles
- Career record: 0–0
- Career titles: 0
- Highest ranking: No. 627 (26 August 2024)
- Last updated on: 10 November 2026.

Federico Cinà (born 30 March 2007) is an Italian professional tennis player. He has a career-high ATP singles ranking of world No. 135 achieved on 19 October 2026 and a doubles ranking of No. 627 reached on 26 August 2024.

== Early life ==
Cinà was born in Palermo, Italy, to parents Susanna Attili and Francesco Cinà. He has a sister, named Giulia.

== Junior career ==
In 2021, Cinà reached the final of the prestigious Petit As, where he lost to Czech Maxim Mrva. In 2022, he represented Italy with Lorenzo Angelini and Lorenzo Carboni at European U-16 Championships, where they reached the final.

In January 2023, Cinà won the J300 Traralgon International. Later that season, he reached the semifinals in the boys’ singles category at the 2023 US Open, where he lost to eventual champion João Fonseca. His best Grand Slam Junior result came at the 2024 French Open, where he was a runner-up in doubles, with Japanese Rei Sakamoto. The pair lost to top seeds Nicolai Budkov Kjær and Joel Schwärzler in the final.

Cinà had good results in Junior circuit, maintaining a 99–53 singles win-loss record and reached an ITF junior combined ranking of world No. 4 in January 2024.

== Professional career ==
=== 2022: ITF debut ===
Cinà won his first ATP point at the age of fifteen years-old, competing in Italy, when he defeated Raffael Schaer at the 2022 M15 Aprilia.

=== 2025: Masters 1000 debut & first win ===
In March 2025, Cinà reached his first Challenger final at the 2025 Crete Challenger II after defeating Aslan Karatsev in straight sets and became the first tennis player born in 2007 to reach a Challenger final. In the final he lost to Dimitar Kuzmanov in straight sets.

In March 2025, Cinà was awarded a wildcard into the 2025 Miami Open for his ATP Tour and Masters 1000 debuts. Ranked No. 441, he recorded his first ATP Tour win in straight sets over qualifier and also Masters debutant Francisco Comesaña, becoming the first player born since 2007 to win a Masters 1000 main draw match. As a result he moved 70 positions up in the singles rankings at world No. 371 on 31 March 2025. In April 2025, he received a wildcard into the 2025 Mutua Madrid Open where he defeated Coleman Wong in straight sets for his second win at the Masters 1000 level.

=== 2026: Challenger title, Major & top 150 debuts ===
In February, Cinà won his maiden Challenger title at the Pune Challenger, defeating Felix Gill in the final. He reached the top 200 as a result.

In May, Cinà made his Grand Slam debut at the French Open having qualified for the main draw with wins over Yosuke Watanuki, Bernard Tomic and Alexis Galarneau. In the first round of the main draw he recorded his first Major win with a five set victory against American Reilly Opelka. In doing so, he became the first man born in 2007 to record a win in a Grand Slam singles match. In the second round he was defeated by Jesper de Jong of the Netherlands.

He made his professional grass-court debut in qualifying for the Wimbledon Championships, where he defeated compatriot Gianluca Cadenasso before being eliminated in the second round by Hugo Gaston. He advanced through qualifying in Gstaad, but was eliminated in the first round by Quentin Halys, after having a match point in the deciding tie-break. He also advanced through qualifying in Kitzbühel, but was defeated in the first round by Facundo Díaz Acosta.

In preparation for the US Open qualifications, he took part in two American Challenger tournaments, making it through only one round. At the 2026 US Open, Cinà was able to win all three qualifying matches needed to make his first main draw at this Major with victories over Luca Nardi, Hugo Dellien and 11th seed Yunchaokete Bu, but in the first round of the tournament Cinà was eliminated by American Alex Michelsen in straight sets with the score of 6-4, 6-1, 6-0. Interrupted due to rain with the second set tied at 1-1, the following day Cinà suffered a loss with a partial score of 11 games to 0.

In Asia, he was eliminated on his debut at the Guangzhou Challenger, but at the ATP 250 of Chengdu, as a lucky loser, he made it to the second round. He then reached the quarterfinals at the Jingshan Challenger, and as a result debuted in the top 150 in the singles rankings and became first player born in 2007 to achieve this result. He passed the qualifications for the Shanghai Masters 1000, earning the main draw of an event of this type for the first time without using a wildcard, but was defeated in his debut match by Alex Molcan, who came back in three sets. He also qualified for the ATP 250 in Brussels, but this time too was eliminated in the first round.

== Personal life ==
"Palli" is Cinà's nickname. His father, Francesco, is also his coach and was a tennis instructor of Italian tennis Grand Slam winner Roberta Vinci. Cinà is a member of CT Vela Messina and trains at the Cinà Tennis Institute.

Cinà enjoys football, and has Cristiano Ronaldo as his favorite athlete.

== Performance timeline ==
Key
W	F	SF	QF	#R	RR	Q#	DNQ	A	NH

(W) winner; (F) finalist; (SF) semifinalist; (QF) quarterfinalist; (#R) rounds 4, 3, 2, 1; (RR) round-robin stage; (Q#) qualification round; (DNQ) did not qualify; (A) absent; (NH) not held; (SR) strike rate (events won / competed); (W–L) win–loss record.

=== Singles ===
Current through the 2026 Shanghai Masters.

Tournament	2025	2026	SR	W–L	Win%
Grand Slam tournaments
Australian Open	A	Q2	0 / 0	0–0	–
French Open	A	2R	0 / 1	1–1	50%
Wimbledon	A	Q2	0 / 0	0–0	–
US Open	Q2	1R	0 / 1	0–1	0%
Win–loss	0–0	1–2	0 / 2	1–2	33%
ATP Masters 1000
Indian Wells Masters	A	A	0 / 0	0–0	–
Miami Open	2R	A	0 / 1	1–1	50%
Monte Carlo Masters	A	A	0 / 0	0–0	–
Madrid Open	2R	1R	0 / 2	1-2	33%
Italian Open	1R	1R	0 / 2	0–2	0%
Canadian Open	A	A	0 / 0	0–0	–
Cincinnati Masters	A	A	0 / 0	0–0	–
Shanghai Masters	A	1R	0 / 1	0–1	0%
Paris Masters	A	A	0 / 0	0–0	–
Win–loss	2–3	0–3	0 / 6	2–6	25%

== ATP Challenger Tour finals ==
Challenger

=== Singles: 4 (1 title, 3 runner-ups) ===
Finals by surface
Hard (1–3)
Clay (–)

Result	W–L	Date	Tournament	Surface	Opponent	Score
Loss	0–1	Mar 2025	Crete Challenger II, Greece	Hard	(Bulgaria) Dimitar Kuzmanov	4–6, 2–6
Loss	0–2	May 2025	Mziuri Cup, Georgia	Hard	(Georgia (country)) Saba Purtseladze	6–7^{(5–7)}, 4–6
Loss	0–3	Oct 2025	Hamburg Ladies & Gents Cup, Germany	Hard (i)	(Germany) Justin Engel	5–7, 6–7^{(4–7)}
Win	1–3	Feb 2026	Pune Challenger, India	Hard	(United Kingdom) Felix Gill	6–3, 5–7, 7–6^{(7–1)}

== ITF World Tennis Tour finals ==
World Tennis

=== Singles: 3 (2 titles, 1 runner-up) ===
Finals by surface
Hard (1–1)
Clay (1–0)

Result	W–L	Date	Tournament	Surface	Opponent	Score
Loss	0–1	Feb 2024	M15 Monastir, Tunisia	Hard	(Croatia) Matej Dodig	6–3, 3–6, 0–6
Win	1–1	Sep 2024	M15 Buzău, Romania	Clay	(Romania) Ioan Alexandru Chiriță	6–4, 6–0
Win	2–1	Feb 2025	M15 Sharm El Sheikh, Egypt	Hard	(United States) Martin Damm Jr.	7–6^{(7–3)}, 7–6^{(7–3)}

=== Doubles: 3 (1 title, 2 runner-ups) ===
Finals by surface
Hard (0–1)
Clay (1–1)

Result	W–L	Date	Tournament	Surface	Partner	Opponents	Score
Win	1–0	Apr 2023	M25 Santa Margherita di Pula, Italy	Clay	(Italy) Niccolò Baroni	(Canada) Roy Stepanov (United States) Tennyson Whiting	6–1, 6–4
Loss	1–1	Apr 2023	M25 Santa Margherita di Pula, Italy	Clay	(Italy) Gianmarco Ferrari	Mikalai Haliak (France) Mathys Erhard	3–6, 6–4, [4–10]
Loss	1–2	Mar 2024	M15 Monastir, Tunisia	Hard	(Italy) Fabio De Michele	(Germany) Florian Broska (Austria) Gregor Ramskogler	5–7, 6–2, [8–10]

== Junior Grand Slam finals ==
=== Doubles: 1 (runner-up) ===
Result	Year	Tournament	Surface	Partner	Opponents	Score
Loss	2024	French Open	Clay	(Japan) Rei Sakamoto	(Norway) Nicolai Budkov Kjær (Austria) Joel Schwärzler	4–6, 6–7^{(3–7)}
