= Felix Gill =

British tennis player (born 2002)

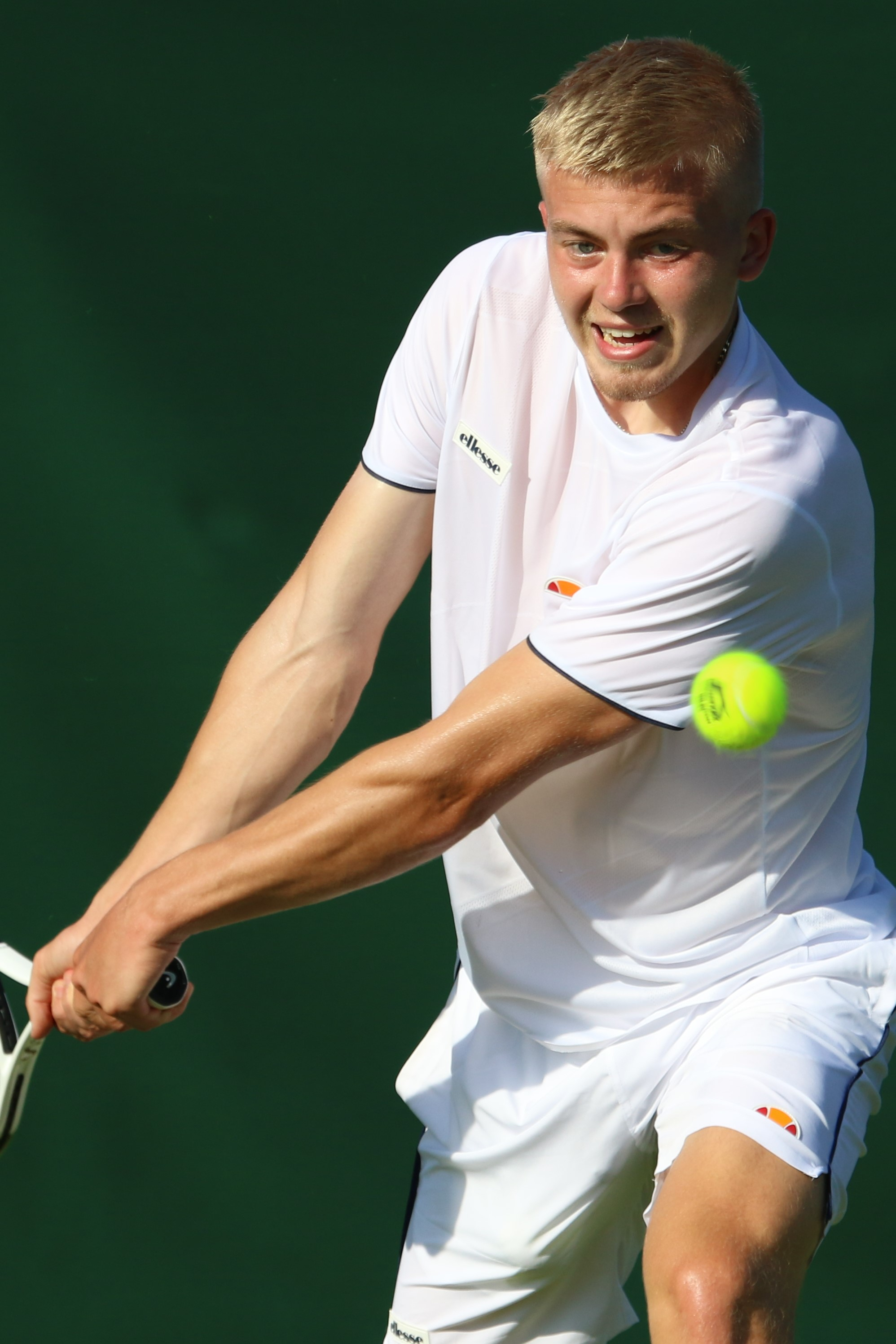
- Gill at the 2022 Wimbledon Championships
- Country (sports): United Kingdom
- Residence: Redditch, United Kingdom
- Born: 1 June 2002 (age 24) Redditch, United Kingdom
- Height: 1.75 m (5 ft 9 in)
- Plays: Left-handed (two-handed backhand)
- Coach: Morgan Phillips, Mark Taylor
- Prize money: US $423,386

Singles
- Career record: 0–2 (at ATP Tour level, Grand Slam level, and in Davis Cup)
- Career titles: 0 Challenger, 9 Futures
- Highest ranking: No. 211 (21 September 2026)
- Current ranking: No. 217 (28 September 2026)

Grand Slam singles results
- French Open: Q3 (2026)
- Wimbledon: 1R (2026)
- US Open: Q1 (2026)

Doubles
- Career record: 1–1 (at ATP Tour level, Grand Slam level, and in Davis Cup)
- Career titles: 0 Challenger, 1 Futures
- Highest ranking: No. 459 (13 June 2022)
- Current ranking: N0. 1,440 (21 September 2026)

Grand Slam doubles results
- Wimbledon: 2R (2022)
- Last updated on: 28 September 2026.

Felix Gill (born 1 June 2002) is a British tennis player. He has a career-high ATP singles ranking of world No. 211 achieved on 21 September 2026 and a career high doubles ranking of No. 459 achieved on 13 June 2022.

== Professional career ==
=== 2022: ATP doubles debut ===
Gill made his ATP Tour debut reaching the second round of the Wimbledon men's doubles draw with compatriot Arthur Fery, defeating Ariel Behar and Gonzalo Escobar, before losing to 11th seeds Kevin Krawietz and Andreas Mies in the second round.

=== 2026: ATP & Major & top 250 debuts, Challenger final ===
Gill reached his first ATP Challenger Tour final in Pune in February, losing to Federico Cinà.

He reached the third round of qualifying at the 2026 French Open but lost to Kyrian Jacquet. At the ATP Challenger, the 2026 Birmingham Open where he received a main draw wildcard, he defeated Ugo Blanchet to reach the round of 16, recording his first win on grass court at this level. Gill was also granted a wildcard into the main draw of the 2026 Ilkley Open, and of the 2026 Nottingham Open, where he defeated fifth seed Hugo Gaston and reached again the round of 16.

Gill received a wildcard for the 2026 Wimbledon Championships making his Grand Slam debut. On his ATP debut, he entered the main draw of the 2026 Eastbourne Open as a lucky loser, receiving a first-round bye, directly into the second round, after the top seed Taylor Fritz late withdrawal.

== ATP Challenger Tour finals ==
=== Singles: 1 (runner-up) ===
| Legend ATP Challenger Tour (0–1) |

| Result | W–L | Date | Tournament | Tier | Surface | Opponent | Score |
|---|---|---|---|---|---|---|---|
| Loss | 0–1 | Feb 2026 | Pune Challenger, India | Challenger | Hard | (Italy) Federico Cinà | 3–6, 7–5, 6–7^{(1–7)} |

== ITF World Tennis Tour finals ==
=== Singles: 18 (9 titles, 9 runner-ups) ===
| Legend ITF WTT (9–9) | Finals by surface Hard (0–1) Clay (9–8) |

| Result | W–L | Date | Tournament | Tier | Surface | Opponent | Score |
|---|---|---|---|---|---|---|---|
| Loss | 0–1 | Sep 2021 | M15 Ulcinj, North Macedonia | WTT | Clay | (Argentina) Alejo Lorenzo Lingua Lavallén | 3–6, 2–6 |
| Loss | 0–2 | Oct 2021 | M15 Antalya, Turkey | WTT | Clay | (United Kingdom) Billy Harris | 3–6, 6–1, 5–7 |
| Win | 1–2 | Nov 2021 | M15 Cairo, Egypt | WTT | Clay | (Italy) Gianluca Acquaroli | 7–6^{(7–4)}, 6–2 |
| Loss | 1–3 | Dec 2021 | M15 Cairo, Egypt | WTT | Clay | (Spain) José Fco Vidal Azorín | 1–6, 2–6 |
| Loss | 1–4 | Apr 2022 | M25 Santa Margherita di Pula, Italy | WTT | Clay | (France) Laurent Lokoli | 5–7, 3–6 |
| Win | 2–4 | Aug 2022 | M15 Eupen, Belgium | WTT | Clay | (Belgium) Buvaysar Gadamauri | 6–3, 6–4 |
| Loss | 2–5 | Sep 2022 | M25 Pardubice, Czech Republic | WTT | Clay | (Czech Republic) Hynek Bartoň | 5–7, 5–7 |
| Loss | 2–6 | Jan 2023 | M25 Manacor, Spain | WTT | Hard | (Spain) Daniel Rincón | 3–6, 3–6 |
| Loss | 2–7 | Oct 2023 | M25 Sabadell, Spain | WTT | Clay | (Lithuania) Vilius Gaubas | 4–6, 4–6 |
| Win | 3–7 | Oct 2023 | M25 Zaragoza, Spain | WTT | Clay | (Argentina) Julio Cesar Porras | 6–4, 6–1 |
| Win | 4–7 | Oct 2023 | M25 Santa Margherita di Pula, Italy | WTT | Clay | (Spain) Oriol Roca Batalla | 6–2, 6–4 |
| Loss | 4–8 | Jun 2025 | M15 Kuršumlijska Banja, Serbia | WTT | Clay | Svyatoslav Gulin | 6–3, 6–7^{(3–7)}, 1–6 |
| Loss | 4–9 | Jun 2025 | M15 Getxo, Spain | WTT | Clay | (Spain) Miguel Damas | 4–6, ret. |
| Win | 5–9 | Sep 2025 | M15 Kuršumlijska Banja, Serbia | WTT | Clay | (Hungary) Máté Valkusz | 3–6, 6–3, 6–4 |
| Win | 6–9 | Oct 2025 | M25 Santa Margherita di Pula, Italy | WTT | Clay | (Poland) Daniel Michalski | 7–6^{(7–5)}, 7–5 |
| Win | 7–9 | Nov 2025 | M15 Antalya, Turkey | WTT | Clay | (Romania) Radu Mihai Papoe | 6–1, 6–3 |
| Win | 8–9 | Nov 2025 | M25 Antalya, Turkey | WTT | Clay | (Italy) Samuele Pieri | 6–2, 6–1 |
| Win | 9–9 | Jan 2026 | M25 Antalya, Turkey | WTT | Clay | (Romania) Filip Cristian Jianu | 6–2, 1–6, 6–2 |

=== Doubles: 2 (1 title, 1 runner-up) ===
| Legend ITF WTT (1–1) |

| Result | W–L | Date | Tournament | Tier | Surface | Partner | Opponents | Score |
|---|---|---|---|---|---|---|---|---|
| Loss | 0–1 | Jul 2021 | M15 Doboj, Bosnia & Herzegovina | WTT | Clay | (Ukraine) Oleksandr Ovcharenko | (Slovakia) Kristof Minarik (Slovakia) Lukáš Pokorný | 6–7^{(5–7)}, 4–6 |
| Win | 1–1 | Mar 2022 | M15 Antalya, Turkey | WTT | Clay | (Argentina) Román Andrés Burruchaga | (Turkey) Sarp Ağabigün (Croatia) Admir Kalender | 6–4, 6–3 |
