= Ranjeet Virali-Murugesan =

Indian tennis player

- Country (sports): India
- Residence: Chennai, India
- Born: 30 September 1985 (age 39); Coimbatore, India
- Plays: Right-handed (two-handed backhand)
- Prize money: $78,967

Singles
- Career record: 0–2 (at ATP Tour level, Grand Slam level, and in Davis Cup)
- Career titles: 1 ITF
- Highest ranking: No. 417 (24 May 2010)
- Current ranking: No. 1044 (2 July 2018)

Doubles
- Career record: 0–0 (at ATP Tour level, Grand Slam level, and in Davis Cup)
- Career titles: 18 ITF
- Highest ranking: No. 268 (11 August 2014)
- Current ranking: No. 1603 (2 July 2018)

Team competitions
- Davis Cup: 0–2
- Last updated on: 5 July 2018.

Ranjeet Virali-Murugesan (born 30 September 1985) is an Indian tennis player.

Virali-Murugesan has a career high ATP singles ranking of 417 achieved on 24 May 2010 and a career high ATP doubles ranking of 268, achieved on 11 August 2014. Virali-Murugesan has won one ITF singles title and eighteen ITF doubles titles.

Virali-Murugesan has represented India at the Davis Cup, where he has a win–loss record of 0–2.
