= Niki Kaliyanda Poonacha =

Indian tennis player (born 1995)

- Country (sports): India
- Born: 27 April 1995 (age 31) Neyveli, India
- Height: 1.91 m (6 ft 3 in)
- Plays: Right-handed (two-handed backhand)
- Prize money: US $240,310

Singles
- Career record: 1–0
- Career titles: 2 Futures
- Highest ranking: No. 605 (14 January 2019)

Doubles
- Career record: 2–9
- Career titles: 8 Challenger, 13 Futures
- Highest ranking: No. 71 (9 November 2026)
- Current ranking: No. 71 (9 November 2026)

Grand Slam doubles results
- Australian Open: 1R (2026)
- US Open: 1R (2026)
- Last updated on: 9 November 2026.

Niki Kaliyanda Poonacha (born 27 April 1995) is an Indian tennis player from Karnataka. He has a career high ATP doubles ranking of No. 71 achieved on 9 November 2026 and a career high singles ranking of No. 605 achieved on 14 January 2019.

Kaliyanda Poonacha has won six ATP Challenger doubles titles.

== Career ==
He won his first Challenger at the 2023 President's Cup with S D Prajwal Dev.

Partnering with Rithvik Choudary Bollipalli, Poonacha won the 2024 San Luis Open Challenger.

In February 2025, he and Dev received a cash prize of Rs.100000 each from the Karnataka State Lawn Tennis Association for winning the gold medal in the 38th National Games tennis doubles for men.

In November, he won a wildcard along with his doubles partner Pruchya Isaro of Thailand, for the 2026 Australian Open men's doubles after winning the Asia-Pacific wildcard playoff.
