= Pune Challenger =

- 2026 Pune Challenger

ATP Challenger Tour
- Event name: PMRDA powered Maha Open (2023-), KPIT MSLTA Challenger (-2019)
- Location: Pune, India
- Venue: Shree Shiv Chhatrapati Sports Complex
- Category: Challenger Tour 100 (2023-2025); Challenger Tour 75 (2026-)
- Surface: Hard
- Draw: 32S/26Q/16D
- Prize money: US$160,000
- Website: Website

The PMRDA (Pune Metropolitan Region Development Authority) Powered Maha Open (previously the KPIT MSLTA Challenger), is a professional tennis tournament, part of the ATP Challenger Tour. It is played on outdoor hardcourts. It has been held annually at the Shree Shiv Chhatrapati Sports Complex in Pune, India since 2014.

== Past finals ==
=== Singles ===
Year	Champion	Runner-up	Score
2026	(Italy) Federico Cinà	(United Kingdom) Felix Gill	6–3, 5–7, 7–6^{(7–1)}
2025	(Czech Republic) Dalibor Svrčina	(United States) Brandon Holt	7–6^{(7–3)}, 6–1
2024	(Monaco) Valentin Vacherot	(Australia) Adam Walton	3–6, 7–6^{(7–5)}, 7–6^{(7–5)}
2023	(Australia) Max Purcell	(Italy) Luca Nardi	6–2, 6–3
2020–2022	Not held		
2019	(Australia) James Duckworth	(United Kingdom) Jay Clarke	4–6, 6–4, 6–4
2018	(Sweden) Elias Ymer	(India) Prajnesh Gunneswaran	6–2, 7–5
2017	(India) Yuki Bhambri	(India) Ramkumar Ramanathan	4–6, 6–3, 6–4
2016	(France) Sadio Doumbia	(India) Prajnesh Gunneswaran	4–6, 6–4, 6–3
2015	(India) Yuki Bhambri	(Russia) Evgeny Donskoy	6–2, 7–6^{(7–4)}
2014	(Japan) Yūichi Sugita	(Spain) Adrián Menéndez Maceiras	6–7^{(1–7)}, 6–4, 6–4

=== Doubles ===
Year	Champions	Runners-up	Score
2026	(South Korea) Nam Ji-sung (Finland) Patrik Niklas-Salminen	(Thailand) Pruchya Isaro (India) Niki Kaliyanda Poonacha	6–4, 6–7^{(1–7)}, [10–7]
2025	(India) Jeevan Nedunchezhiyan (India) Vijay Sundar Prashanth	(Australia) Blake Bayldon (Australia) Matthew Romios	3–6, 6–3, [10–0]
2024	(Australia) Tristan Schoolkate (Australia) Adam Walton	(France) Dan Added (South Korea) Chung Yun-seong	7–6^{(7–4)}, 7–5
2023	(India) Anirudh Chandrasekar (India) Vijay Sundar Prashanth	(Japan) Toshihide Matsui (Japan) Kaito Uesugi	6–1, 4–6, [10–3]
2020–2022	Not held		
2019	(India) Purav Raja (India) Ramkumar Ramanathan	(India) Arjun Kadhe (India) Saketh Myneni	7–6^{(7–3)}, 6–3
2018	(India) Vijay Sundar Prashanth (India) Ramkumar Ramanathan	(Chinese Taipei) Hsieh Cheng-peng (Chinese Taipei) Yang Tsung-hua	7–6^{(7–3)}, 6–7^{(5–7)}, [10–7]
2017	(Bosnia and Herzegovina) Tomislav Brkić (Croatia) Ante Pavić	(Spain) Pedro Martínez (Spain) Adrián Menéndez Maceiras	6–1, 7–6^{(7–5)}
2016	(India) Purav Raja (India) Divij Sharan	(Switzerland) Luca Margaroli (France) Hugo Nys	3–6, 6–3, [11–9]
2015	(Spain) Gerard Granollers (Spain) Adrián Menéndez Maceiras	(Austria) Maximilian Neuchrist (India) Divij Sharan	1–6, 6–3, [10–6]
2014	(India) Saketh Myneni (India) Sanam Singh	(Thailand) Sanchai Ratiwatana (Thailand) Sonchat Ratiwatana	6–3, 6–2
