= Saketh Myneni =

Indian tennis player

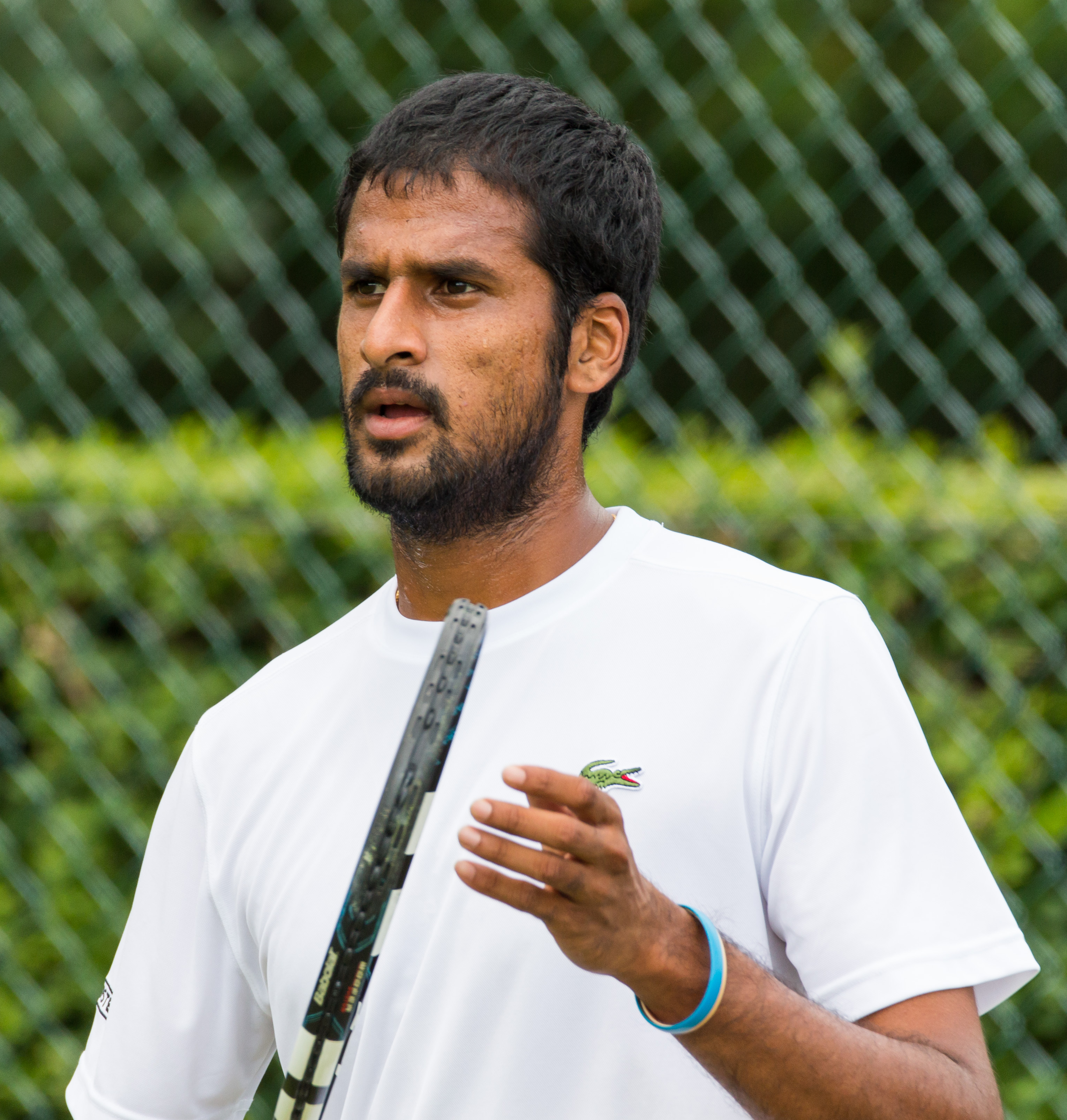
- Myneni at the 2015 Wimbledon Qualifying Tournament
- Country (sports): India
- Residence: Visakhapatnam, India
- Born: 19 October 1987 (age 38) Vuyyuru, India
- Height: 1.93 m (6 ft 4 in)
- Turned pro: Nov 2011
- Plays: Right-handed (two-handed backhand)
- Prize money: $515,299

Singles
- Career record: 2–3
- Career titles: 0
- Highest ranking: No. 137 (12 September 2016)

Grand Slam singles results
- Australian Open: Q3 (2016)
- French Open: Q2 (2016)
- Wimbledon: Q2 (2015)
- US Open: 1R (2016)

Doubles
- Career record: 20–26
- Career titles: 0
- Highest ranking: No. 74 (16 January 2023)
- Current ranking: No. 101 (15 January 2024)

Grand Slam doubles results
- Australian Open: 1R (2023)
- French Open: 2R (2023)
- Wimbledon: 1R (2023)
- US Open: 1R (2023)
Medal record
Men's tennis
Representing India
Asian Games
Gold medal – first place	2014 Incheon	Mixed doubles
Silver medal – second place	2014 Incheon	Doubles
Silver medal – second place	2022 Hangzhou	Doubles
South Asian Games
Gold medal – first place	2019 Kathmandu/Pokhara	Doubles
Gold medal – first place	2019 Kathmandu/Pokhara	Team event
Silver medal – second place	2016 Guwahati	Singles
Silver medal – second place	2019 Kathmandu/Pokhara	Singles
- Last updated on: 19 January 2024.

Saketh Myneni (born 19 October 1987) is an Indian professional tennis player. He has a career-high doubles ranking of No. 74 achieved on 16 January 2023. He was conferred with the prestigious Arjuna Award in 2017 and represents India in the Davis Cup. He won a gold medal in Mixed doubles and a silver medal in the men's doubles event at the Incheon Asian Games 2014. He has won 10 ITF and 2 ATP Challenger singles titles. Also, 18 ITF and 14 ATP Challenger doubles titles.

== Personal life ==
Myneni was born in a small town named Vuyyuru in Andhra Pradesh to Prasad Myneni and Saroja Myneni. He grew up entirely in Visakhapatnam (Vizag). He completed his schooling from Timpany Secondary School, Visakhapatnam, before moving to Hyderabad for tennis. He started playing tennis at the age of 11. His nickname is Saké or Saki. He was selected on a sports scholarship in 2006 and graduated with a double major with degrees in Finance and Economics from the University of Alabama in 2010. His hobbies include listening to music, watching movies and TV shows. He currently resides in Visakhapatnam and trains every now and then in Hyderabad. He proposed his girlfriend Sri Lakshmi Anumolu during the official Davis Cup dinner on 14 September 2016. His compatriot Leander Paes described the scene as "First Marriage Proposal I have witnessed congrats to cute couple". The couple married each other on 22 December 2016.

== Professional career ==
=== 2014: Challenger level success and Asiad gold and silver ===
He made his Indian Davis Cup Team debut at the 2014 Davis Cup Asia/Oceania Zone Group I Tie with Chinese Taipei, where he partnered Rohan Bopanna in the Doubles He won both his doubles and Singles match as India successfully defeated Chinese Taipei 5–0.

Myneni win his first ever challenger title at the SBI Challenger where he partnered Sanam Singh. They defeated compatriots Divij Sharan and Vishnu Vardhan 6–3, 3–6, [10–4] in an all Indian final. Coincidentally both the pair in the finals entered the draw as a wildcards. A week later they won the Delhi Challenger where they upset top seeds Purav Raja and Divij Sharan 7–6 (7–4), 1–6, [10–4] in the 1st round and then 2nd seeds in the final to capture the title.

In the next Davis Cup tie against South Korea, he and Bopanna again won their match as India won the tie 3–1 to qualify for World Group play-offs.

At 2014 Incheon Asian Games he partnered with Sania Mirza to capture the mixed doubles Gold. He also won the silver medal in men's doubles at same event where he partnered alongside Sanam Singh.

Myneni won his first singles ATP Challenger title at the Indore Challenger where he upset top seed Aleksandr Nedovyesov 6–3, 6–7(4–7), 6–3 in the final. He and Sanam Singh then won the KPIT MSLTA Challenger where they again defeated Sanchai Ratiwatana and Sonchat Ratiwatana of Thailand in straight sets. In the singles of the same tournament, he defeated players with much higher ranks namely Fabrice Martin, Hiroki Moriya and Aleksandr Nedovyesov respectively all in straight sets but lost to the eventual champion Yūichi Sugita in straight sets in semis.

=== 2020-2021: Inactivity due to COVID-19, ITF doubles success ===
Saketh entered only two tournaments in 2020 and played only seven professional matches. The first tournament was Maharashtra Open where he entered singles qualifying draw as a wildcard and lost to Nikola Milojević in straight sets. The second tournament was Bengaluru Challenger where he reached third round in singles after defeating Russians Aslan Karatsev and Evgeny Donskoy in straight sets but lost to ninth seeded Thomas Fabbiano. In Doubles, he partnered Matt Reid and upset top seeds Hsieh Cheng-peng and Denys Molchanov before retiring in semi-finals against eventual champions Purav Raja and Ramkumar Ramanathan.

After the COVID-19 pandemic had shut down tennis in March, Myneni decided to remain inactive for the rest of 2020 even when tennis came back in August.

=== 2023: Australian and Wimbledon debuts and first major win ===
He made his Major debut at the 2023 Australian Open as a wildcard pair with Yuki Bhambri. He won his first Grand Slam match at the 2023 French Open with Bhambri defeating wildcards Arthur Rinderknech and Enzo Couacaud. He made his debut at the 2023 Wimbledon Championships as an alternate pair with Bhambri.

== ATP Challenger Tour finals ==
=== Singles: 5 (2–3) ===
Legend Grand Slam (0–0) Olympic Games (0–0) ATP Tour Masters 1000 (0–0) ATP Tour 500 series (0–0) ATP Tour 250 series (0–0) ATP Challenger Tour (2–3)	Titles by surface Hard (2–3) Clay (0–0) Grass (0–0) Carpet (0–0)

Result	W–L	Date	Tournament	Tier	Surface	Opponents	Score
Win	1–0	Oct 2014	Indore, India	Challenger	Hard	(Kazakhstan) Aleksandr Nedovyesov	6–3, 6–7^{(4–7)}, 6–3
Win	2–0	Oct 2015	Vietnam Open, Vietnam	Challenger	Hard	(Australia) Jordan Thompson	7–5, 6–3
Loss	2–1	Oct 2015	Ağrı, Turkey	Challenger	Hard	(Uzbekistan) Farrukh Dustov	4–6, 4–6
Loss	2–2	Feb 2016	New Delhi, India	Challenger	Hard	(France) Stéphane Robert	3–6, 0–6
Loss	2–3	Nov 2018	Bangalore, India	Challenger	Hard	(India) Prajnesh Gunneswaran	2–6, 2–6

=== Doubles: 29 (21–8) ===
Legend Grand Slam (0–0) Olympic Games (0–0) ATP Tour Masters 1000 (0–0) ATP Tour 500 series (0–0) ATP Tour 250 series (0–0) ATP Challenger Tour (21–8)	Titles by surface Hard (19–7) Clay (2–0) Grass (0–0) Carpet (0–1)

Result	W–L	Date	Tournament	Tier	Surface	Partner	Opponents	Score
Win	1–0	Feb 2014	Kolkata, India	Challenger	Hard	(India) Sanam Singh	(India) Divij Sharan (India) Vishnu Vardhan	6–3, 3–6, [10–4]
Win	2–0	Feb 2014	New Delhi, India	Challenger	Hard	(India) Sanam Singh	(Thailand) Sanchai Ratiwatana (Thailand) Sonchat Ratiwatana	7–6^{(7–5)}, 6–4
Win	3–0	Oct 2014	Pune, India	Challenger	Hard	(India) Sanam Singh	(Thailand) Sanchai Ratiwatana (Thailand) Sonchat Ratiwatana	6–3, 6–2
Win	4–0	Sep 2015	İzmir, Turkey	Challenger	Hard	(India) Divij Sharan	(Tunisia) Malek Jaziri (Ukraine) Denys Molchanov	7–6^{(7–5)}, 4–6, 0–0 (ret)
Win	5–0	Oct 2015	Bangalore, India	Challenger	Hard	(India) Sanam Singh	(United States) John Paul Fruttero (India) Vijay Sundar Prashanth	5–7, 6–4, [10–2]
Loss	5–1	Feb 2016	New Delhi, India	Challenger	Hard	(India) Sanam Singh	(India) Yuki Bhambri (India) Mahesh Bhupathi	3–6, 6–4, [5–10]
Loss	5–2	Mar 2016	Shenzhen, China	Challenger	Hard	(India) Jeevan Nedunchezhiyan	(Australia) Luke Saville (Australia) Jordan Thompson	6–3, 4–6, [10–12]
Win	6–2	Apr 2016	Nanjing, China	Challenger	Hard	(India) Jeevan Nedunchezhiyan	(Ukraine) Denys Molchanov (Kazakhstan) Aleksandr Nedovyesov	6–3, 6–3
Loss	6–3	Aug 2016	Granby, Canada	Challenger	Hard	(India) Sanam Singh	(Brazil) Guilherme Clezar (Colombia) Alejandro González	6–3, 1–6, [10–12]
Win	7–3	Oct 2017	Ho Chi Minh City, Vietnam	Challenger	Hard	(India) Vijay Sundar Prashanth	(Japan) Ben McLachlan (Japan) Go Soeda	7–6^{(7–3)}, 7–6^{(7–5)}
Loss	7–4	Apr 2018	Taipei, Taiwan	Challenger	Carpet(i)	(India) Prajnesh Gunneswaran	(Australia) Matthew Ebden (Australia) Andrew Whittington	4–6, 7–5, [6–10]
Loss	7–5	Jun 2018	Fergana, Uzbekistan	Challenger	Hard	(India) Vijay Sundar Prashanth	(Russia) Ivan Gakhov (Russia) Alexander Pavlioutchenkov	4–6, 4–6
Win	8–5	Jul 2019	Chengdu, China	Challenger	Hard	(India) Arjun Kadhe	(South Korea) Nam Ji-sung (South Korea) Song Min-kyu	6–3, 0–6, [10–6]
Loss	8–6	Nov 2019	Pune, India	Challenger	Hard	(India) Arjun Kadhe	(India) Purav Raja (India) Ramkumar Ramanathan	6–7^{(3–7)}, 3–6
Win	9–6	Feb 2022	Bangalore, India	Challenger	Hard	(India) Ramkumar Ramanathan	(France) Hugo Grenier (France) Alexandre Müller	6–3, 6–2
Loss	9–7	Feb 2022	Bangalore, India	Challenger	Hard	(India) Ramkumar Ramanathan	(Austria) Alexander Erler (India) Arjun Kadhe	3–6, 7–6^{(7–4)}, [7–10]
Win	10–7	Apr 2022	Salinas, Ecuador	Challenger	Hard	(India) Yuki Bhambri	(United States) JC Aragone (Ecuador) Roberto Quiroz	4–6, 6–3, [10–7]
Win	11–7	May 2022	Prostějov, Czech Republic	Challenger	Clay	(India) Yuki Bhambri	(Czech Republic) Roman Jebavý (Slovakia) Andrej Martin	6–3, 7–5
Win	12–7	Jul 2022	Porto, Portugal	Challenger	Hard	(India) Yuki Bhambri	(Portugal) Nuno Borges (Portugal) Francisco Cabral	6–4, 3–6, [10–6]
Win	13–7	Aug 2022	Lexington, USA	Challenger	Hard	(India) Yuki Bhambri	(Netherlands) Gijs Brouwer (United Kingdom) Aidan McHugh	3–6, 6–4, [10–8]
Win	14–7	Aug 2022	Mallorca, Spain	Challenger	Hard	(India) Yuki Bhambri	(Czech Republic) Marek Gengel (Czech Republic) Lukáš Rosol	6–2, 6–2
Win	15–7	Jan 2023	Nonthaburi, Thailand	Challenger	Hard	(India) Yuki Bhambri	(Indonesia) Christopher Rungkat (Australia) Akira Santillan	2–6, 7–6^{(9–7)}, [14–12]
Win	16–7	Apr 2023	Girona, Spain	Challenger	Clay	(India) Yuki Bhambri	(Spain) Íñigo Cervantes (Spain) Oriol Roca Batalla	6–4, 6–4
Win	17–7	Feb 2024	Chennai, India	Challenger	Hard	(India) Ramkumar Ramanathan	(India) Rithvik Choudary Bollipalli (India) Niki Kaliyanda Poonacha	3–6, 6–3, [10–5]
Win	18–7	Feb 2024	Bangalore, India	Challenger	Hard	(India) Ramkumar Ramanathan	(France) Constantin Bittoun Kouzmine (France) Maxime Janvier	6–3, 6–4
Win	19–7	Nov 2024	Seoul, South Korea	Challenger	Hard	(India) Ramkumar Ramanathan	(United States) Vasil Kirkov (Netherlands) Bart Stevens	6–4, 4–6, [10–3]
Win	20–7	Nov 2024	Yokohama, Japan	Challenger	Hard	(Lebanon) Benjamin Hassan	(Australia) Blake Bayldon (Australia) Calum Puttergill	6–2, 6–4
Loss	20–8	Feb 2025	Chennai, India	Challenger	Hard	(India) Ramkumar Ramanathan	(Japan) Shintaro Mochizuki (Japan) Kaito Uesugi	4–6, 4–6
Win	21–8	May 2026	Bengaluru, India	Challenger	Hard	(India) Niki Kaliyanda Poonacha	Petr Bar Biryukov (Kazakhstan) Grigoriy Lomakin	6–2, 6–3

== Other finals ==
=== Asian Games ===
Finals: 2 (1–1)

==== Doubles inals: 2 (1–1) ====
Result	W–L	Date	Tournament	Tier	Surface	Partner	Opponents	Score
Silver	0–1	29 September 2014	2014 Asian Games	Asian Games	Hard	(India) Sanam Singh	(South Korea) Hyeon Chung (South Korea) Lim Yong-kyu	5–7, 6–7^{(2–7)}
Gold	1-1	29 September 2014	2014 Asian Games	Asian Games	Hard	(India) Sania Mirza	(Chinese Taipei) Peng Hsien-yin (Chinese Taipei) Chan Hao-ching	6–4, 6–3

=== South Asian Games ===
Finals: 3 (1–2)

==== Singles Finals: 2 (0–2) ====
Result	W–L	Date	Tournament	Tier	Surface	Opponent	Score
Silver	0–1	12 February 2016	2016 South Asian Games	South Asian Games	Hard	(India) Ramkumar Ramanathan	5–7, 2–6
Silver	0–2	9 December 2019	2019 South Asian Games	South Asian Games	Hard	(India) Manish Sureshkumar	4–6, 6–7^{(6–7)}

==== Doubles finals: 1 (1–0) ====
Result	W–L	Date	Tournament	Tier	Surface	Partner	Opponents	Score
Gold	1–0	8 December 2019	2019 South Asian Games	South Asian Games	Hard	(India) Vishnu Vardhan	(India) Sriram Balaji (India) Jeevan Nedunchezhiyan	7–5,3–6,[10–5]
