= 2015 Delhi Open – Men's singles =

Men's singles
- 2015 Delhi Open

Final
- Champion: (India) Somdev Devvarman
- Runner-up: (India) Yuki Bhambri
- Score: 3–6, 6–4, 6–0

Events
Singles	men	women
Doubles	men	women
← 2014 ·	Delhi Open	· 2016 →

Somdev Devvarman was the defending champion and successfully defended his title, defeating Yuki Bhambri in the final, 3–6, 6–4, 6–0.

== Seeds ==
1. (Australia) James Duckworth (second round)
2. (Russia) Alexander Kudryavtsev (first round)
3. (Japan) Yūichi Sugita (first round)
4. (Belgium) Ruben Bemelmans (semifinals)
5. (India) Somdev Devvarman (champion)
6. (Australia) Luke Saville (quarterfinals)
7. (Moldova) Radu Albot (quarterfinals)
8. (Australia) Alex Bolt (first round)

== Draw ==
=== Key ===
- Q = Qualifier
- WC = Wild card
- LL = Lucky loser
- Alt = Alternate
- SE = Special exempt
- PR = Protected ranking
- ITF = ITF entry
- JE = Junior exempt
- w/o = Walkover
- r = Retired
- d = Defaulted
- SR = Special ranking

=== Finals ===
Semifinals
5	(India) Somdev Devvarman	6	6
(Belgium) Kimmer Coppejans	3	1
4	(Belgium) Ruben Bemelmans	6	3	5
WC	(India) Yuki Bhambri	4	6	7

Final
5	(India) Somdev Devvarman	3	6	6
WC	(India) Yuki Bhambri	6	4	0

=== Top half ===
First round
1	(Australia) J Duckworth	6	6
Q	(Croatia) D Marcan	1	2
WC	(India) S Singh	6	4	6
(France) F Martin	1	6	2
Q	(India) VS Prashanth	6^{5}	7^{7}	6^{5}
(Croatia) N Mektić	7^{7}	6^{5}	7^{7}
(Croatia) A Veić	6	0^{r}
5	(India) S Devvarman	4	2
3	(Japan) Y Sugita	7	3	4
(Egypt) M Safwat	5	6	6
WC	(India) Karunuday Singh	5	2
(India) S Myneni	7	6
(Portugal) FF Silva	5	7	6
(Croatia) T Androić	7	5	4
(Belgium) K Coppejans	7^{7}	7^{7}
8	(Australia) A Bolt	6^{0}	6^{2}

Second round
1	(Australia) J Duckworth	6	5	4
WC	(India) S Singh	3	7	6
(Croatia) N Mektić	4	2
5	(India) S Devvarman	6	6
(Egypt) M Safwat	2	3
(India) S Myneni	6	6
(Portugal) FF Silva	3	2
(Belgium) K Coppejans	6	6

Quarterfinals
WC	(India) S Singh	6	1	3
5	(India) S Devvarman	4	6	6
(India) S Myneni	4	3
(Belgium) K Coppejans	6	6

Semifinals
5	(India) S Devvarman	6	6
(Belgium) K Coppejans	3	1

=== Bottom half ===
First round
6	(Australia) L Saville	6	6
Q	(India) S Balaji	4	2
(Serbia) I Bozoljac	3	4
(Spain) E López-Pérez	6	6
(Serbia) P Krstin	6	7
WC	(India) V Vardhan	4	5
(Chinese Taipei) T-h Yang	4	5
4	(Belgium) R Bemelmans	6	7
7	(Moldova) R Albot	6	6
(Chinese Taipei) T Chen	3	3
(India) R Ramanathan	4	7^{7}	6
Q	(Germany) R Becker	6	6^{3}	4
LL	(Australia) A Whittington	6	5	5
(Belarus) E Gerasimov	2	7	7
WC	(India) Y Bhambri	7	7^{7}
2	(Russia) A Kudryavtsev	5	6^{2}

Second round
6	(Australia) L Saville	6	4	6
(Spain) E López-Pérez	3	6	3
(Serbia) P Krstin	6^{4}	3
4	(Belgium) R Bemelmans	7^{7}	6
7	(Moldova) R Albot	6	6
(India) R Ramanathan	4	2
(Belarus) E Gerasimov	3	3
WC	(India) Y Bhambri	6	6

Quarterfinals
6	(Australia) L Saville	4	4
4	(Belgium) R Bemelmans	6	6
7	(Moldova) R Albot	6^{3}	3
WC	(India) Y Bhambri	7^{7}	6

Semifinals
4	(Belgium) R Bemelmans	6	3	5
WC	(India) Y Bhambri	4	6	7
