= 2014 ONGC–GAIL Delhi Open – Men's singles =

GAIL Delhi Open – Men's singles
- 2014 ONGC–GAIL Delhi Open

Final
- Champion: (India) Somdev Devvarman
- Runner-up: (Kazakhstan) Aleksandr Nedovyesov
- Score: 6–3, 6–1

Events
Singles	men	women
Doubles	men	women
ONGC–GAIL Delhi Open	· 2015 →

ONGC-GAIL Delhi Open is now known as Delhi Open. The first edition of this tournament was held in 2014. The category of Men's singles of this tournament (2014 ONGC–GAIL Delhi Open men's singles) was won by Somdev Devvarman. He defeated Aleksandr Nedovyesov in the final, 6-3, 6-1.

== Seeds ==
1. (Kazakhstan) Aleksandr Nedovyesov (final)
2. (India) Somdev Devvarman (champion)
3. (Germany) Peter Gojowczyk (first round)
4. (Russia) Evgeny Donskoy (semifinals)
5. (Japan) Go Soeda (first round)
6. (India) Yuki Bhambri (first round)
7. (Slovenia) Blaž Rola (second round)
8. (Ukraine) Illya Marchenko (quarterfinals)

== Draw ==
=== Key ===
- Q = Qualifier
- WC = Wild card
- LL = Lucky loser
- Alt = Alternate
- SE = Special exempt
- PR = Protected ranking
- ITF = ITF entry
- JE = Junior exempt
- w/o = Walkover
- r = Retired
- d = Defaulted
- SR = Special ranking

=== Finals ===
Semifinals
1	(Kazakhstan) Aleksandr Nedovesov	4	7^{7}	6
SE	(Serbia) Ilija Bozoljac	6	6^{3}	3
4	(Russia) Evgeny Donskoy	4	2
2	(India) Somdev Devvarman	6	6

Final
1	(Kazakhstan) Aleksandr Nedovesov	3	1
2	(India) Somdev Devvarman	6	6

=== Top half ===
First round
1	(Kazakhstan) A Nedovesov	7^{8}	6
(Spain) G Granollers	6^{6}	1
(Argentina) A Velotti	1	6^{4}
(Japan) Y Sugita	6	7^{7}
WC	(India) S Myneni	6^{4}	6^{4}
(Italy) T Fabbiano	7^{7}	7^{7}
(France) L Pouille	2	7	7
6	(India) Y Bhambri	6	5	5
3	(Germany) P Gojowczyk	5	5
(Egypt) M Safwat	7	7
SE	(Serbia) I Bozoljac	6	6^{5}	6
WC	(India) R Ramanathan	2	7^{7}	4
Q	(France) A Michon	6	6
(Spain) A Menéndez-Maceiras	2	1
WC	(India) S Singh	2	6	4
8	(Ukraine) I Marchenko	6	3	6

Second round
1	(Kazakhstan) A Nedovesov	4	6	7^{7}
(Japan) Y Sugita	6	3	6^{3}
(Italy) T Fabbiano	4	4
(France) L Pouille	6	6
(Egypt) M Safwat	3	1
SE	(Serbia) I Bozoljac	6	6
Q	(France) A Michon	6	2	4
8	(Ukraine) I Marchenko	3	6	6

Quarterfinals
1	(Kazakhstan) A Nedovesov	6	6
(France) L Pouille	2	4
SE	(Serbia) I Bozoljac	6	7^{9}
8	(Ukraine) I Marchenko	4	6^{7}

Semifinals
1	(Kazakhstan) A Nedovesov	4	7^{7}	6
SE	(Serbia) I Bozoljac	6	6^{3}	3

=== Bottom half ===
First round
7	(Slovenia) B Rola	6	3	7^{7}
(Spain) D Muñoz de la Nava	4	6	6^{5}
Q	(United Kingdom) D Cox	4	3
(Moldova) R Albot	6	6
(Germany) M Bachinger	2	7^{7}	7
(Canada) S Diez	6	6^{3}	5
Q	(Portugal) R Machado	6	3	2
4	(Russia) E Donskoy	4	6	6
5	(Japan) G Soeda	2	1
(Switzerland) M Chiudinelli	6	6
(China) Z Zhang	6	6
(Chinese Taipei) T-h Yang	1	1
Q	(Chinese Taipei) T Chen	4	3
(China) D Wu	6	6
WC	(India) Karunuday Singh	2	5
2	(India) S Devvarman	6	7

Second round
7	(Slovenia) B Rola	4	7	4
(Moldova) R Albot	6	5	6
(Germany) M Bachinger	5	1
4	(Russia) E Donskoy	7	6
(Switzerland) M Chiudinelli	5	4
(China) Z Zhang	7	6
(China) D Wu	2	2
2	(India) S Devvarman	6	6

Quarterfinals
(Moldova) R Albot	2	2
4	(Russia) E Donskoy	6	6
(China) Z Zhang	2	0^{r}
2	(India) S Devvarman	6	0

Semifinals
4	(Russia) E Donskoy	4	2
2	(India) S Devvarman	6	6
