= 2014 ONGC–GAIL Delhi Open – Men's doubles =

GAIL Delhi Open – Men's doubles
- 2014 ONGC–GAIL Delhi Open

Final
- Champion: (India) Saketh Myneni (India) Sanam Singh
- Runner-up: (Thailand) Sanchai Ratiwatana (Thailand) Sonchat Ratiwatana
- Score: 7–6^{(7–5)}, 6–4

Events
Singles	men	women
Doubles	men	women
ONGC–GAIL Delhi Open	· 2015 →

This was the first edition of the event.

Myneni and Singh won the title, defeating Sanchai Ratiwatana and Sonchat Ratiwatana in the final, 7–6^{(7–5)}, 6–4.

== Seeds ==
1. (India) Purav Raja / (India) Divij Sharan (first round)
2. (Thailand) Sanchai Ratiwatana / (Thailand) Sonchat Ratiwatana (final)
3. (India) Yuki Bhambri / (New Zealand) Michael Venus (quarterfinals)
4. (Spain) Adrián Menéndez-Maceiras / (Kazakhstan) Aleksandr Nedovesov (semifinals)

== Draw ==
=== Key ===
- Q = Qualifier
- WC = Wild card
- LL = Lucky loser
- Alt = Alternate
- SE = Special exempt
- PR = Protected ranking
- ITF = ITF entry
- JE = Junior exempt
- w/o = Walkover
- r = Retired
- d = Defaulted
- SR = Special ranking

=== Draw ===
First round
1	(India) P Raja (India) D Sharan	6^{4}	6	[4]
WC	(India) S Myneni (India) S Singh	7^{7}	1	[10]
(Canada) S Diez (Japan) G Soeda	5	4
(India) N S Balaji (Chinese Taipei) T Chen	7	6
4	(Spain) A Menéndez-Maceiras (Kazakhstan) A Nedovesov	7^{7}	6
(France) L Pouille (Australia) M Reid	6^{5}	4
WC	(India) R Ramanathan (India) R Virali-Murugesan	6	2	[6]
(Germany) M Bachinger (Italy) T Fabbiano	2	6	[10]
(Philippines) R Gonzales (New Zealand) A Sitak	3	2
(India) J Nedunchezhiyan (India) V Vardhan	6	6
(South Africa) R Roelofse (South Africa) I Merwe	2	3
3	(India) Y Bhambri (Australia) M Venus	6	6
(Moldova) R Albot (Ukraine) I Marchenko	6	5	[10]
(Greece) T Angelinos (India) S Devvarman	5	7	[6]
(Chinese Taipei) Peng H-y (Chinese Taipei) Yang T-h	6	3	[10]
2	(Thailand) Sa Ratiwatana (Thailand) So Ratiwatana	3	6	[12]

Quarterfinals
WC	(India) S Myneni (India) S Singh	6^{4}	7^{7}	[10]
(India) N S Balaji (Chinese Taipei) T Chen	7^{7}	6^{4}	[7]
4	(Spain) A Menéndez-Maceiras (Kazakhstan) A Nedovesov	6^{6}	6	[10]
(Germany) M Bachinger (Italy) T Fabbiano	7^{8}	1	[5]
(India) J Nedunchezhiyan (India) V Vardhan	6	5	[11]
3	(India) Y Bhambri (Australia) M Venus	3	7	[9]
(Moldova) R Albot (Ukraine) I Marchenko	3	7^{11}	[6]
2	(Thailand) Sa Ratiwatana (Thailand) So Ratiwatana	6	6^{9}	[10]

Semifinals
WC	(India) S Myneni (India) S Singh	6	6
4	(Spain) A Menéndez-Maceiras (Kazakhstan) A Nedovesov	3	2
(India) J Nedunchezhiyan (India) V Vardhan	6	3	[7]
2	(Thailand) Sa Ratiwatana (Thailand) So Ratiwatana	3	6	[10]

Final
WC	(India) S Myneni (India) S Singh	7^{7}	6
2	(Thailand) Sa Ratiwatana (Thailand) So Ratiwatana	6^{5}	4
