= 2015 Delhi Open – Women's doubles =

Women's doubles
- 2015 Delhi Open

Final
- Champions: (China) Tang Haochen (China) Yang Zhaoxuan
- Runners-up: (Chinese Taipei) Hsu Ching-wen (Chinese Taipei) Lee Pei-chi
- Score: 7–5, 6–1

Events
Singles	men	women
Doubles	men	women
← 2014 ·	Delhi Open	· 2016 →

Nicha Lertpitaksinchai and Peangtarn Plipuech were the defending champions, but they lost in the first round.

Tang Haochen and Yang Zhaoxuan won the title, defeating Hsu Ching-wen and Lee Pei-chi in the final, 7–5, 6–1.

== Seeds ==
1. (Thailand) Nicha Lertpitaksinchai / (Thailand) Peangtarn Plipuech (first round)
2. (Poland) Magda Linette / (Hong Kong) Zhang Ling (quarterfinals)
3. (India) Ankita Raina / (United Kingdom) Emily Webley-Smith (first round)
4. (Japan) Miyu Kato / (Japan) Riko Sawayanagi (quarterfinals)

== Draw ==
=== Key ===
- Q = Qualifier
- WC = Wild card
- LL = Lucky loser
- Alt = Alternate
- SE = Special exempt
- PR = Protected ranking
- ITF = ITF entry
- JE = Junior exempt
- w/o = Walkover
- r = Retired
- d = Defaulted
- SR = Special ranking

First round
1	(Thailand) N Lertpitaksinchai (Thailand) Pe Plipuech	6	3	[5]
(Chinese Taipei) Y-h Lee (India) Shweta Rana	3	6	[10]
(India) N Palha (India) R Sunkara	5	4
(Chinese Taipei) C-w Hsu (Chinese Taipei) P-c Lee	7	6
3	(India) A Raina (United Kingdom) E Webley-Smith	6	2	[6]
(India) Nidhi Chilumula (Switzerland) C Perrin	1	6	[10]
(Slovenia) T Majerič (India) P Thombare	6	3	[12]
(Japan) E Sema (Russia) A Smolina	2	6	[10]
(Russia) V Ivakhnenko (Slovenia) D Jakupović	6	7
(United Kingdom) H Dart (France) V Muntean	3	5
WC	(India) S Reddy (India) Dhruthi Tatachar Venugopal	1	2
4	(Japan) M Kato (Japan) R Sawayanagi	6	6
WC	(India) P Bhambri (India) Rashmi Teltumbde	6	6^{2}	[11]
(China) H Tang (China) Z Yang	3	7^{7}	[13]
WC	(India) S Bavisetti (India) KK Thandi	6	2	[3]
2	(Poland) M Linette (Hong Kong) L Zhang	3	6	[10]

Quarterfinals
(Chinese Taipei) Y-h Lee (India) S Rana	2	2
(Chinese Taipei) C-w Hsu (Chinese Taipei) P-c Lee	6	6
(India) N Chilumula (Switzerland) C Perrin	3	7	[5]
(Slovenia) T Majerič (India) P Thombare	6	5	[10]
(Russia) V Ivakhnenko (Slovenia) D Jakupović	4	6	[10]
4	(Japan) M Kato (Japan) R Sawayanagi	6	3	[6]
(China) H Tang (China) Z Yang	6^{5}	6	[10]
2	(Poland) M Linette (Hong Kong) L Zhang	7^{7}	4	[5]

Semifinals
(Chinese Taipei) C-w Hsu (Chinese Taipei) P-c Lee	7^{7}	6
(Slovenia) T Majerič (India) P Thombare	6^{0}	0
(Russia) V Ivakhnenko (Slovenia) D Jakupović	7^{7}	4	[7]
(China) H Tang (China) Z Yang	6^{4}	6	[10]

Final
(Chinese Taipei) C-w Hsu (Chinese Taipei) P-c Lee	5	1
(China) H Tang (China) Z Yang	7	6
