= 2015 Delhi Open – Women's singles =

Women's singles
- 2015 Delhi Open

Final
- Champion: (Poland) Magda Linette
- Runner-up: (Slovenia) Tadeja Majerič
- Score: 6–1, 6–1

Events
Singles	men	women
Doubles	men	women
← 2014 ·	Delhi Open	· 2016 →

Wang Qiang was the defending champion but chose not to compete.

== Seeds ==
1. (Thailand) Luksika Kumkhum (second round)
2. (Poland) Magda Linette (champion)
3. (China) Zhang Kailin (first round)
4. (Japan) Junri Namigata (second round)
5. (Hong Kong) Zhang Ling (first round)
6. (China) Yang Zhaoxuan (quarterfinals)
7. (Croatia) Tadeja Majerič (final)
8. (India) Ankita Raina (first round)

== Draw ==
=== Key ===
- Q = Qualifier
- WC = Wild card
- LL = Lucky loser
- Alt = Alternate
- SE = Special exempt
- PR = Protected ranking
- ITF = ITF entry
- JE = Junior exempt
- w/o = Walkover
- r = Retired
- d = Defaulted
- SR = Special ranking

=== Finals ===
Semifinals
(Japan) Riko Sawayanagi	1	2
7	(Slovenia) Tadeja Majerič	6	6
(Slovenia) Dalila Jakupović	2	3
2	(Poland) Magda Linette	6	6

Final
7	(Slovenia) Tadeja Majerič	1	1
2	(Poland) Magda Linette	6	6

=== Top half ===
First round
1	(Thailand) L Kumkhum	6	6
(Japan) E Sema	0	3
(United Kingdom) E Webley-Smith	6^{1}	1
(Japan) R Sawayanagi	7^{7}	6
(Switzerland) C Perrin	6	3	1
(Russia) V Ivakhnenko	3	6	6
(Ukraine) O Savchuk	6	6
8	(India) A Raina	4	4
4	(Japan) J Namigata	6	6
WC	(India) P Bhambri	2	2
(United Kingdom) K Dunne	6	5	7
Q	(Belgium) M Benoît	4	7	5
Q	(Philippines) K Lehnert	6	6^{5}	0
Q	(India) Dhruthi Tatachar Venugopal	3	7^{7}	6
WC	(India) P Thombare	2	2
7	(Slovenia) T Majerič	6	6

Second round
1	(Thailand) L Kumkhum	6^{5}	2
(Japan) R Sawayanagi	7^{7}	6
(Russia) V Ivakhnenko	4	6	5
(Ukraine) O Savchuk	6	2	7
4	(Japan) J Namigata	1	6	3
(United Kingdom) K Dunne	6	4	6
Q	(India) D Tatachar Venugopal	2	4
7	(Slovenia) T Majerič	6	6

Quarterfinals
(Japan) R Sawayanagi	6	1	6
(Ukraine) O Savchuk	1	6	1
(United Kingdom) K Dunne	4	4
7	(Slovenia) T Majerič	6	6

Semifinals
(Japan) R Sawayanagi	1	2
7	(Slovenia) T Majerič	6	6

=== Bottom half ===
First round
6	(China) Z Yang	7	6
(Thailand) N Lertpitaksinchai	5	2
WC	(India) KK Thandi	1	6	2
(Chinese Taipei) Y-h Lee	6	4	6
Q	(Thailand) P Plipuech	6	6
Q	(India) Nidhi Chilumula	2	4
(Slovenia) D Jakupović	6	6
3	(China) K Zhang	2	3
5	(Hong Kong) L Zhang	0	3
Q	(China) H Tang	6	6
WC	(India) S Bavisetti	4	5^{r}
Q	(Romania) Cristina Ene	6	4
(Thailand) T Tanasugarn	6	2	4
(Japan) M Kato	3	6	6
Q	(France) E Cascino	5	2
2	(Poland) M Linette	7	6

Second round
6	(China) Z Yang	6^{6}	6	6
(Chinese Taipei) Y-h Lee	7^{8}	1	0
Q	(Thailand) P Plipuech	0	6	3
(Slovenia) D Jakupović	6	4	6
Q	(China) H Tang	0	7	1
Q	(Romania) C Ene	6	5	6
(Japan) M Kato	6^{4}	1
2	(Poland) M Linette	7^{7}	6

Quarterfinals
6	(China) Z Yang	3	2
(Slovenia) D Jakupović	6	6
Q	(Romania) C Ene	2	4
2	(Poland) M Linette	6	6

Semifinals
(Slovenia) D Jakupović	2	3
2	(Poland) M Linette	6	6
