= 2015 Emami Kolkata Open ATP Challenger Tour – Doubles =

Doubles
- 2015 Emami Kolkata Open ATP Challenger Tour

Final
- Champions: (India) Somdev Devvarman (India) Jeevan Nedunchezhiyan
- Runners-up: (Australia) James Duckworth (Australia) Luke Saville
- Score: Walkover

Events
Singles	Doubles
← 2014 ·	Emami Kolkata Open ATP Challenger Tour	· 2016 →

Saketh Myneni and Sanam Singh were the defending champions, but lost in the first round.

Somdev Devvarman and Jeevan Nedunchezhiyan won the title when James Duckworth and Luke Saville withdrew from the final.

== Seeds ==
1. (Moldova) Radu Albot / (Italy) Riccardo Ghedin (first round)
2. (Chinese Taipei) Chen Ti / (Spain) Enrique López-Pérez (semifinals)
3. (India) Saketh Myneni / (India) Sanam Singh (first round)
4. (India) Ramkumar Ramanathan / (India) Divij Sharan (quarterfinals)

== Draw ==
=== Key ===
- Q = Qualifier
- WC = Wild card
- LL = Lucky loser
- Alt = Alternate
- SE = Special exempt
- PR = Protected ranking
- ITF = ITF entry
- JE = Junior exempt
- w/o = Walkover
- r = Retired
- d = Defaulted
- SR = Special ranking

First round
1	(Moldova) R Albot (Italy) R Ghedin	3	5
(Belgium) R Bemelmans (Serbia) I Bozoljac	6	7
WC	(India) C Sood (India) L Sood	3	4
(Croatia) T Androić (Croatia) N Mektic	6	6
3	(India) S Myneni (India) S Singh	6	2	[5]
(India) S Devvarman (India) J Nedunchezhiyan	2	6	[10]
(Serbia) M Jankovic (Egypt) M Safwat	2	3
(Croatia) D Marcan (Croatia) A Šančić	6	6
(Belgium) K Coppejans (Portugal) FF Silva	4	3
(Australia) J Duckworth (Australia) L Saville	6	6
(India) S Balaji (India) V Vardhan	5	6	[8]
4	(India) R Ramanathan (India) D Sharan	7	4	[10]
WC	(India) N Kaliyanda Poonacha (India) Shahbaaz Khan	2	2
(Belarus) E Gerasimov (Russia) A Kudryavtsev	6	6
WC	(India) S Mukund (India) VS Prashanth	3	1
2	(Chinese Taipei) T Chen (Spain) E López-Pérez	6	6

Quarterfinals
(Belgium) R Bemelmans (Serbia) I Bozoljac	6	6
(Croatia) T Androić (Croatia) N Mektic	2	3
(India) S Devvarman (India) J Nedunchezhiyan	6	6
(Croatia) D Marcan (Croatia) A Šančić	4	2
(Australia) J Duckworth (Australia) L Saville	6	6
4	(India) R Ramanathan (India) D Sharan	1	4
(Belarus) E Gerasimov (Russia) A Kudryavtsev	6	4	[11]
2	(Chinese Taipei) T Chen (Spain) E López-Pérez	2	6	[13]

Semifinals
(Belgium) R Bemelmans (Serbia) I Bozoljac	6^{9}	7^{7}	[9]
(India) S Devvarman (India) J Nedunchezhiyan	7^{11}	6^{5}	[11]
(Australia) J Duckworth (Australia) L Saville	6	6
2	(Chinese Taipei) T Chen (Spain) E López-Pérez	2	4

Final
(India) S Devvarman (India) J Nedunchezhiyan	w/o
(Australia) J Duckworth (Australia) L Saville
