= 2014 State Bank of India ATP Challenger Tour – Singles =

Singles
- 2014 State Bank of India ATP Challenger Tour

Final
- Champion: (Serbia) Ilija Bozoljac
- Runner-up: (Russia) Evgeny Donskoy
- Score: 6–1, 6–1

Events
Singles	Doubles
State Bank of India ATP Challenger Tour	· 2015 →

This was the first edition of the event.

Bozoljac won the title, defeating Evgeny Donskoy in the final, 6–1, 6–1.

== Seeds ==
1. (Kazakhstan) Aleksandr Nedovyesov (semifinals)
2. (India) Somdev Devvarman (semifinals)
3. (Russia) Evgeny Donskoy (final)
4. (Japan) Go Soeda (second round)
5. (Slovenia) Blaž Rola (first round)
6. (Ukraine) Illya Marchenko (first round)
7. (Moldova) Radu Albot (second round)
8. (France) David Guez (quarterfinals)

== Draw ==
=== Key ===
- Q = Qualifier
- WC = Wild card
- LL = Lucky loser
- Alt = Alternate
- SE = Special exempt
- PR = Protected ranking
- ITF = ITF entry
- JE = Junior exempt
- w/o = Walkover
- r = Retired
- d = Defaulted
- SR = Special ranking

=== Finals ===
Semifinals
1	(Kazakhstan) Aleksandr Nedovyesov	6	5	3
(Serbia) Ilija Bozoljac	0	7	6
3	(Russia) Evgeny Donskoy	3	7	6
2/WC	(India) Somdev Devvarman	6	5	2

Final
(Serbia) Ilija Bozoljac	6	6
3	(Russia) Evgeny Donskoy	1	1

=== Top half ===
First round
1	(Kazakhstan) A Nedovyesov	6	6
Q	(Portugal) R Machado	2	4
(United Kingdom) D Cox	1	7	6
WC	(India) S Singh	6	5	4
(Spain) J Samper-Montaña	3	1
(Spain) G Granollers	6	6
(China) Z Zhang	6^{1}	0
8	(France) D Guez	7^{7}	6
4	(Japan) G Soeda	6	3	7
(Greece) T Angelinos	3	6	5
(Serbia) I Bozoljac	6	6
Q	(Chinese Taipei) Yang T-h	3	2
(Spain) D Muñoz de la Nava	6	6
(France) A Michon	3	3
(Argentina) A Velotti	7^{7}	6
5	(Slovenia) B Rola	6^{3}	4

Second round
1	(Kazakhstan) A Nedovyesov	6	4	6
(United Kingdom) D Cox	3	6	4
(Spain) G Granollers	5	3
8	(France) D Guez	7	6
4	(Japan) G Soeda	4	3
(Serbia) I Bozoljac	6	6
(Spain) D Muñoz de la Nava	3	2
(Argentina) A Velotti	6	6

Quarterfinals
1	(Kazakhstan) A Nedovyesov	6	6
8	(France) D Guez	1	3
(Serbia) I Bozoljac	6	6
(Argentina) A Velotti	4	4

Semifinals
1	(Kazakhstan) A Nedovyesov	6	5	3
(Serbia) I Bozoljac	0	7	6

=== Bottom half ===
First round
6	(Ukraine) I Marchenko	6^{3}	4
(Switzerland) M Chiudinelli	7^{7}	6
Q	(Chinese Taipei) T Chen	6	6
WC	(India) V Vardhan	3	2
(India) Y Bhambri	4	6	6
Q	(Chinese Taipei) Huang L-c	6	3	0
WC	(India) S Myneni	4	2
3	(Russia) E Donskoy	6	6
7	(Moldova) R Albot	6	3	6
(Canada) S Diez	2	6	4
(Italy) T Fabbiano	4	2
(Spain) A Menéndez-Maceiras	6	6
(Russia) A Kudryavtsev	6	6
(France) L Pouille	3	1
(Egypt) M Safwat	4	4
2/WC	(India) S Devvarman	6	6

Second round
(Switzerland) M Chiudinelli	5	7^{7}	3
Q	(Chinese Taipei) T Chen	7	6^{0}	6
(India) Y Bhambri	3	4
3	(Russia) E Donskoy	6	6
7	(Moldova) R Albot	4	6^{3}
(Spain) A Menéndez-Maceiras	6	7^{7}
(Russia) A Kudryavtsev	3	3
2/WC	(India) S Devvarman	6	6

Quarterfinals
Q	(Chinese Taipei) T Chen	4	4
3	(Russia) E Donskoy	6	6
(Spain) A Menéndez-Maceiras	6	1	3
2/WC	(India) S Devvarman	4	6	6

Semifinals
3	(Russia) E Donskoy	3	7	6
2/WC	(India) S Devvarman	6	5	2
