= 2016 Delhi Open – Men's doubles =

Men's doubles
- 2016 Delhi Open

Final
- Champions: (India) Yuki Bhambri (India) Mahesh Bhupathi
- Runners-up: (India) Saketh Myneni (India) Sanam Singh
- Score: 6–3 , 4–6 , [10–5]

Events
Singles	men	women
Doubles	men	women
← 2015 ·	Delhi Open	· 2024 →

Egor Gerasimov and Alexander Kudryavtsev were the defending champions, but they decided not to defend their title .

Yuki Bhambri and Mahesh Bhupathi won the title, defeating Saketh Myneni and Sanam Singh in the final 6–3, 4–6, [10–5] .

== Seeds ==
1. (Italy) Flavio Cipolla / (India) Divij Sharan (semifinals)
2. (China) Bai Yan / (China) Li Zhe (first round)
3. (Chinese Taipei) Chen Ti / (Austria) Tristan-Samuel Weissborn (first round)
4. (India) Saketh Myneni / (India) Sanam Singh (final)

== Draw ==
=== Key ===
- Q = Qualifier
- WC = Wild card
- LL = Lucky loser
- Alt = Alternate
- SE = Special exempt
- PR = Protected ranking
- ITF = ITF entry
- JE = Junior exempt
- w/o = Walkover
- r = Retired
- d = Defaulted
- SR = Special ranking

First round
1	(Italy) F Cipolla (India) D Sharan	6	6
(Belgium) N Desein (France) M Janvier	2	1
(Belgium) K Coppejans (Belgium) J De Loore	1	6	[10]
(Australia) M Barton (Australia) B Mitchell	6	3	[7]
4	(India) S Myneni (India) S Singh	6	7
WC	(India) S Balaji (India) V Vardhan	3	5
(Russia) M Kalovelonis (Switzerland) L Margaroli	5	5
(India) J Nedunchezhiyan (India) VS Prashanth	7	7
(Italy) A Bega (Italy) R Marcora	3	4
WC	(India) MM Jayaprakash (India) Vinayak Sharma Kaza	6	6
(Chinese Taipei) J Wang (China) Z Zhang	6	2	[10]
3	(Chinese Taipei) T Chen (Austria) T-S Weissborn	3	6	[8]
(India) Y Bhambri (India) M Bhupathi	4	6	[10]
WC	(India) C Sood (India) L Sood	6	1	[2]
(Belgium) Y Mertens (France) S Robert	6	5	[15]
2	(China) Y Bai (China) Z Li	3	7	[13]

Quarterfinals
1	(Italy) F Cipolla (India) D Sharan	w/o
(Belgium) K Coppejans (Belgium) J De Loore
4	(India) S Myneni (India) S Singh	7^{7}	6
(India) J Nedunchezhiyan (India) VS Prashanth	6^{4}	4
WC	(India) MM Jayaprakash (India) V Sharma Kaza	1	4
(Chinese Taipei) J Wang (China) Z Zhang	6	6
(India) Y Bhambri (India) M Bhupathi	7	6
(Belgium) Y Mertens (France) S Robert	5	1

Semifinals
1	(Italy) F Cipolla (India) D Sharan	3	3
4	(India) S Myneni (India) S Singh	6	6
(Chinese Taipei) J Wang (China) Z Zhang	1	3
(India) Y Bhambri (India) M Bhupathi	6	6

Final
4	(India) S Myneni (India) S Singh	3	6	[5]
(India) Y Bhambri (India) M Bhupathi	6	4	[10]
