= 2014 ONGC–GAIL Delhi Open – Women's doubles =

GAIL Delhi Open – Women's doubles
- 2014 ONGC–GAIL Delhi Open

Final
- Champion: (Thailand) Nicha Lertpitaksinchai (Thailand) Peangtarn Plipuech
- Runner-up: (Japan) Erika Sema (Japan) Yurika Sema
- Score: 7–6^{(7–5)}, 6–3

Events
Singles	men	women
Doubles	men	women
ONGC–GAIL Delhi Open	· 2015 →

This was the first edition of the event.

Nicha Lertpitaksinchai and Peangtarn Plipuech won the title, defeating Erika Sema and Yurika Sema in the final, 7–6^{(7–5)}, 6–3.

== Seeds ==
1. (Japan) Erika Sema / (Japan) Yurika Sema (final)
2. (Ukraine) Yuliya Beygelzimer / (United Kingdom) Emily Webley-Smith (semifinals)
3. (Thailand) Nicha Lertpitaksinchai / (Thailand) Peangtarn Plipuech (champions)
4. (Ukraine) Veronika Kapshay / (United Kingdom) Samantha Murray (first round)

== Draw ==
=== Key ===
- Q = Qualifier
- WC = Wild card
- LL = Lucky loser
- Alt = Alternate
- SE = Special exempt
- PR = Protected ranking
- ITF = ITF entry
- JE = Junior exempt
- w/o = Walkover
- r = Retired
- d = Defaulted
- SR = Special ranking

=== Draw ===
First round
1	(Japan) E Sema (Japan) Y Sema	6	6
(India) A Bhambri (India) R Chakravarthi	0	1
(Israel) Deniz Khazaniuk (Belarus) I Kremen	6	6
(India) S Balu (India) N Palha	2	1
4	(Ukraine) V Kapshay (United Kingdom) S Murray	6	5	[6]
(New Zealand) A Guthrie (India) R Sunkara	1	7	[10]
(India) P Bhambri (India) Nidhi Chilumula	2	6^{1}
(Thailand) N Lertcheewakarn (Thailand) Vara Wongteanchai	6	7^{7}
(India) A Raina (India) P Thombare	7	5	[10]
(Japan) K Hisami (Japan) J Namigata	5	7	[8]
(Japan) R Fujiwara (India) Sharon Sanchana	2	4
3	(Thailand) N Lertpitaksinchai (Thailand) Pe Plipuech	6	6
(India) Sai Chamarthi (India) Eetee Maheta	6	6
(India) Arantxa Andrady (India) Anushka Bhargava	0	3
(New Zealand) E Hayman (India) Shweta Rana	1	3
2	(Ukraine) Y Beygelzimer (United Kingdom) E Webley-Smith	6	6

Quarterfinals
1	(Japan) E Sema (Japan) Y Sema	6	7^{7}
(Israel) D Khazaniuk (Belarus) I Kremen	4	6^{5}
(New Zealand) A Guthrie (India) R Sunkara	6	4	[3]
(Thailand) N Lertcheewakarn (Thailand) Vara Wongteanchai	2	6	[10]
(India) A Raina (India) P Thombare	4	7	[8]
3	(Thailand) N Lertpitaksinchai (Thailand) Pe Plipuech	6	5	[10]
(India) S Chamarthi (India) E Maheta	1	3
2	(Ukraine) Y Beygelzimer (United Kingdom) E Webley-Smith	6	6

Semifinals
1	(Japan) E Sema (Japan) Y Sema	6	1	[10]
(Thailand) N Lertcheewakarn (Thailand) Vara Wongteanchai	1	6	[8]
3	(Thailand) N Lertpitaksinchai (Thailand) Pe Plipuech	2	6	[10]
2	(Ukraine) Y Beygelzimer (United Kingdom) E Webley-Smith	6	4	[6]

Final
1	(Japan) E Sema (Japan) Y Sema	6^{5}	3
3	(Thailand) N Lertpitaksinchai (Thailand) Pe Plipuech	7^{7}	6
