= 2026 Delhi Open – Singles =

Singles
- 2026 Delhi Open

Final
- Champion: (Greece) Stefanos Sakellaridis
- Runner-up: (United Kingdom) Oliver Crawford
- Score: 7–5, 4–6, 7–6^{(8–6)}

Events
Singles	Doubles
- Delhi Open

Kyrian Jacquet was the defending champion but chose not to defend his title.

Stefanos Sakellaridis won the title after defeating Oliver Crawford 7–5, 4–6, 7–6^{(8–6)} in the final.

== Seeds ==
1. (Australia) Dane Sweeny (first round)
2. (Japan) Rei Sakamoto (semifinals)
3. (United Kingdom) Jay Clarke (quarterfinals)
4. (Argentina) Federico Agustín Gómez (first round)
5. (United Kingdom) Oliver Crawford (final)
6. (Italy) Federico Cinà (quarterfinals)
7. (Poland) Daniel Michalski (second round)
8. (Japan) Rio Noguchi (quarterfinals)

== Draw ==
Key

- Q = Qualifier
- WC = Wild card
- LL = Lucky loser
- Alt = Alternate
- ITF = ITF entry
- PR = Protected ranking
- SR = Special ranking
- SE = Special exempt
- JE = Junior exempt
- JR = Junior Accelerator Programme entrant
- CO = College Accelerator Programme entrant
- NG = Next Gen Accelerator Program entrant
- w/o = Walkover
- r = Retired
- d = Defaulted

=== Finals ===
Semifinals
(Greece) Stefanos Sakellaridis	6	7^{7}
(United Kingdom) Felix Gill	1	6^{5}
5	(United Kingdom) Oliver Crawford	6	6
2	(Japan) Rei Sakamoto	4	3

Final
(Greece) Stefanos Sakellaridis	7	4	7^{8}
5	(United Kingdom) Oliver Crawford	5	6	6^{6}

=== Top half ===
First round
1	(Australia) D Sweeny	7^{8}	2	2
(Kazakhstan) B Zhukayev	6^{6}	6	6
(Greece) S Sakellaridis	6	7
Q	(India) Manish Sureshkumar	4	5
PR	(Australia) P Sekulic	4	5
(Bulgaria) D Kuzmanov	6	7
WC	(India) M Dhamne	5	4
8	(Japan) R Noguchi	7	6
4	(Argentina) FA Gómez	4	6	6^{2}
(United Kingdom) F Gill	6	3	7^{7}
P Bar Biryukov	6	6
WC	(India) Digvijaypratap Singh	3	4
(Lithuania) E Butvilas	3	5
(Belgium) M Geerts	6	7
WC	(India) K Singh	6	6^{5}	3
7	(Poland) D Michalski	4	7^{7}	6

Second round
(Kazakhstan) B Zhukayev	6	1	4
(Greece) S Sakellaridis	4	6	6
(Bulgaria) D Kuzmanov	4	3
8	(Japan) R Noguchi	6	6
(United Kingdom) F Gill	6	7^{7}
P Bar Biryukov	3	6^{3}
(Belgium) M Geerts	7^{10}	6
7	(Poland) D Michalski	6^{8}	4

Quarterfinals
(Greece) S Sakellaridis	6	6
8	(Japan) R Noguchi	0	3
(United Kingdom) F Gill	4	6	6
(Belgium) M Geerts	6	3	4

Semifinals
(Greece) S Sakellaridis	6	7^{7}
(United Kingdom) F Gill	1	6^{5}

=== Bottom half ===
First round
5	(United Kingdom) O Crawford	7^{7}	7
(Croatia) D Ajduković	6^{3}	5
Alt	(South Korea) Shin San-hui	3	3
PR	I Ivashka	6	6
Q	(Italy) A Binda	6^{7}	6	6
Q	(Kazakhstan) D Yevseyev	7^{9}	1	2
Q	(Poland) M Kaśnikowski	6^{4}	4
3	(United Kingdom) J Clarke	7^{7}	6
6	(Italy) F Cinà	6	6
Q	(Greece) Ioannis Xilas	2	4
Alt	(Spain) D Jordà Sanchis	3	5
(India) S Nagal	6	7
(United Kingdom) A Gray	6	7^{8}
Q	(South Korea) H Chung	0	6^{6}
(Portugal) F Ferreira Silva	2	2
2	(Japan) R Sakamoto	6	6

Second round
5	(United Kingdom) O Crawford	6	6
PR	I Ivashka	1	4
Q	(Italy) A Binda	4	4
3	(United Kingdom) J Clarke	6	6
6	(Italy) F Cinà	6	6
(India) S Nagal	4	4
(United Kingdom) A Gray	6	1	4
2	(Japan) R Sakamoto	1	6	6

Quarterfinals
5	(United Kingdom) O Crawford	3	7	6
3	(United Kingdom) J Clarke	6	5	3
6	(Italy) F Cinà	7^{9}	3	2
2	(Japan) R Sakamoto	6^{7}	6	6

Semifinals
5	(United Kingdom) O Crawford	6	6
2	(Japan) R Sakamoto	4	3
