= 2014 ONGC–GAIL Delhi Open – Women's singles =

GAIL Delhi Open – Women's singles
- 2014 ONGC–GAIL Delhi Open

Final
- Champion: (China) Wang Qiang
- Runner-up: (Ukraine) Yuliya Beygelzimer
- Score: 6–1, 6–3

Events
Singles	men	women
Doubles	men	women
ONGC–GAIL Delhi Open	· 2015 →

This was the first edition of the event.

Wang Qiang won the title, defeating Yuliya Beygelzimer in the final, 6–1, 6–3.

== Seeds ==
1. (Japan) Erika Sema (quarterfinals)
2. (Ukraine) Olga Savchuk (semifinals)
3. (Ukraine) Yuliya Beygelzimer (final)
4. (Japan) Yurika Sema (quarterfinals)
5. (Thailand) Noppawan Lertcheewakarn (second round)
6. (United Kingdom) Samantha Murray (first round)
7. (Belarus) Ilona Kremen (semifinals)
8. (China) Wang Qiang (champion)

== Draw ==
=== Key ===
- Q = Qualifier
- WC = Wild card
- LL = Lucky loser
- Alt = Alternate
- SE = Special exempt
- PR = Protected ranking
- ITF = ITF entry
- JE = Junior exempt
- w/o = Walkover
- r = Retired
- d = Defaulted
- SR = Special ranking

=== Finals ===
Semifinals
8	(China) Wang Qiang	6	6
7	(Belarus) Ilona Kremen	2	3
3	(Ukraine) Yuliya Beygelzimer	6	6
2	(Ukraine) Olga Savchuk	2	1

Final
8	(China) Wang Qiang	6	6
3	(Ukraine) Yuliya Beygelzimer	1	3

=== Top half ===
First round
1	(Japan) E Sema	6	6
WC	(India) P Bhambri	1	3
(India) P Thombare	4	5
(Ukraine) V Kapshay	6	7
(Israel) D Khazaniuk	7	6^{3}	6
Q	(India) Eetee Maheta	5	7^{7}	0
Q	(India) Shweta Rana	2	0
8	(China) W Qiang	6	6
4	(Japan) Y Sema	7	6
(Thailand) N Lertpitaksinchai	5	4
(Japan) R Fujiwara	5	6	6
Q	(India) R Chakravarthi	7	3	3
WC	(India) N Palha	6	6
Q	(India) Manya Nagpal	2	2
WC	(Japan) K Hisami	1	2
7	(Belarus) I Kremen	6	6

Second round
1	(Japan) E Sema	7	6^{4}	6
(Ukraine) V Kapshay	5	7^{7}	0
(Israel) D Khazaniuk	2	0
8	(China) W Qiang	6	6
4	(Japan) Y Sema	6	0
(Japan) R Fujiwara	3	1
WC	(India) N Palha	3	4
7	(Belarus) I Kremen	6	6

Quarterfinals
1	(Japan) E Sema	2	3
8	(China) W Qiang	6	6
4	(Japan) Y Sema	3	1
7	(Belarus) I Kremen	6	6

Semifinals
8	(China) W Qiang	6	6
7	(Belarus) I Kremen	2	3

=== Bottom half ===
First round
5	(Thailand) N Lertcheewakarn	7	6
(United Kingdom) E Webley-Smith	5	3
(India) A Raina	7^{7}	6
WC	(India) R Sunkara	6^{2}	2
(Japan) J Namigata	6	6
Q	(New Zealand) A Guthrie	0	3
Q	(India) R Bhatia	2	3
3	(Ukraine) Y Beygelzimer	6	6
6	(United Kingdom) S Murray	2	3
(Thailand) V Wongteanchai	6	6
Q	(India) Vaniya Dangwal	2	0
(India) S Balu	6	6
(Thailand) P Plipuech	6	6
(India) Nidhi Chilumula	3	2
Q	(India) Sharon Sanchana Paul	0	1
2	(Ukraine) O Savchuk	6	6

Second round
5	(Thailand) N Lertcheewakarn	3	1
(India) A Raina	6	6
(Japan) J Namigata	3	3
3	(Ukraine) Y Beygelzimer	6	6
(Thailand) V Wongteanchai	7^{22}	7^{7}
(India) S Balu	6^{20}	6^{4}
(Thailand) P Plipuech	6	2	1
2	(Ukraine) O Savchuk	3	6	6

Quarterfinals
(India) A Raina	3	5
3	(Ukraine) Y Beygelzimer	6	7
(Thailand) V Wongteanchai	2	2
2	(Ukraine) O Savchuk	6	6

Semifinals
3	(Ukraine) Y Beygelzimer	6	6
2	(Ukraine) O Savchuk	2	1
