= 2025 Delhi Open – Singles =

Singles
- 2025 Delhi Open

Final
- Champion: (France) Kyrian Jacquet
- Runner-up: (United Kingdom) Billy Harris
- Score: 6–4, 6–2

Events
| Singles | Doubles |
| ← 2024 · | Delhi Open | · 2026 → |

Geoffrey Blancaneaux was the defending champion but chose not to defend his title.

Kyrian Jacquet won the title after defeating Billy Harris 6–4, 6–2 in the final.

== Seeds ==
1. (Czech Republic) Vít Kopřiva (semifinals)
2. (United Kingdom) Billy Harris (final)
3. (Australia) Tristan Schoolkate (semifinals)
4. (South Africa) Lloyd Harris (withdrew)
5. (Denmark) Elmer Møller (first round)
6. (Japan) Shintaro Mochizuki (quarterfinals)
7. (Japan) Sho Shimabukuro (first round)
8. (Kazakhstan) Timofey Skatov (second round)

== Draw ==
=== Key ===
- Q = Qualifier
- WC = Wild card
- LL = Lucky loser
- Alt = Alternate
- ITF = ITF entry
- PR = Protected ranking
- SR = Special ranking
- SE = Special exempt
- JE = Junior exempt
- JR = Junior Accelerator Programme entrant
- CO = College Accelerator Programme entrant
- NG = Next Gen Accelerator Program entrant
- w/o = Walkover
- r = Retired
- d = Defaulted

=== Finals ===
Semifinals
1 | (Czech Republic) Vít Kopřiva | 3 | 1
(France) Kyrian Jacquet | 6 | 6
3 | (Australia) Tristan Schoolkate | 6 | 6^{4} | 2
2 | (United Kingdom) Billy Harris | 4 | 7^{7} | 6

Final
(France) Kyrian Jacquet | 6 | 6
2 | (United Kingdom) Billy Harris | 4 | 2

=== Top half ===
First round
1 | (Czech Republic) V Kopřiva | 6 | 6
(France) C Denolly | 3 | 4
WC | (India) R Ramanathan | 2 | 6 | 0
(Czech Republic) D Svrčina | 6 | 2 | 6
Q | (Czech Republic) H Bartoň | 3 | 6 | 6
(Japan) R Noguchi | 6 | 3 | 4
(Denmark) A Holmgren | 3 | 5
6 | (Japan) S Mochizuki | 6 | 7
LL | (France) S Gueymard Wayenburg | 6 | 2 | 0
WC | (India) M Sasikumar | 4 | 6 | 6
(Belgium) M Geerts | 6 | 7
(Hungary) Z Piros | 3 | 5
(United Kingdom) J Clarke | 6 | 6
Q | (Japan) M Imamura | 1 | 4
(France) K Jacquet | 6 | 6
7 | (Japan) S Shimabukuro | 1 | 2

Second round
1 | (Czech Republic) V Kopřiva | 6 | 6
(Czech Republic) D Svrčina | 4 | 1
Q | (Czech Republic) H Bartoň | 6 | 4 | 3
6 | (Japan) S Mochizuki | 2 | 6 | 6
WC | (India) M Sasikumar | 4 | 5
(Belgium) M Geerts | 6 | 7
(United Kingdom) J Clarke | 5 | 3
(France) K Jacquet | 7 | 6

Quarterfinals
1 | (Czech Republic) V Kopřiva | 6 | 6
6 | (Japan) S Mochizuki | 2 | 4
(Belgium) M Geerts | 3 | 6^{3}
(France) K Jacquet | 6 | 7^{7}

Semifinals
1 | (Czech Republic) V Kopřiva | 3 | 1
(France) K Jacquet | 6 | 6

=== Bottom half ===
First round
8 | (Kazakhstan) T Skatov | 6 | 6
WC | (India) K Singh | 4 | 0
(Czech Republic) M Gengel | 2 | 2
Q | (United States) Andre Ilagan | 6 | 6
Q | (Czech Republic) J Veselý | 1 | 4
(Monaco) V Vacherot | 6 | 6
(Turkey) E Kırkın | 0 | 6^{10}
3 | (Australia) T Schoolkate | 6 | 7^{12}
5 | (Denmark) E Møller | 3 | 1
SE | (Sweden) E Ymer | 6 | 6
Q | E Agafonov | 6 | 6
Alt | (Ukraine) O Ovcharenko | 3 | 0
(Italy) E Dalla Valle | 6 | 2 | 3
(Australia) J McCabe | 2 | 6 | 6
Q | (Ukraine) Eric Vanshelboim | 1 | 4
2 | (United Kingdom) B Harris | 6 | 6

Second round
8 | (Kazakhstan) T Skatov | 2 | 3
Q | (United States) A Ilagan | 6 | 6
(Monaco) V Vacherot | 6^{4} | 6 | 4
3 | (Australia) T Schoolkate | 7^{7} | 3 | 6
SE | (Sweden) E Ymer | 6 | 6
Q | E Agafonov | 3 | 4
(Australia) J McCabe | 6^{2} | 3
2 | (United Kingdom) B Harris | 7^{7} | 6

Quarterfinals
Q | (United States) A Ilagan | 7^{7} | 6^{1} | 2
3 | (Australia) T Schoolkate | 6^{2} | 7^{7} | 6
SE | (Sweden) E Ymer | 2 | 6 | 6^{1}
2 | (United Kingdom) B Harris | 6 | 4 | 7^{7}

Semifinals
3 | (Australia) T Schoolkate | 6 | 6^{4} | 2
2 | (United Kingdom) B Harris | 4 | 7^{7} | 6
