= 2026 Delhi Open – Doubles =

Doubles
- 2026 Delhi Open

Final
- Champions: (India) Siddhant Banthia (Bulgaria) Alexander Donski
- Runners-up: (Thailand) Pruchya Isaro (India) Niki Kaliyanda Poonacha
- Score: 4–6, 6–4, [12–10]

Events
Singles	Doubles
- Delhi Open

Masamichi Imamura and Rio Noguchi were the defending champions but only Noguchi chose to defend his title, partnering Luca Castelnuovo. They lost in the quarterfinals to Pruchya Isaro and Niki Kaliyanda Poonacha.

Siddhant Banthia and Alexander Donski won the title after defeating Isaro and Kaliyanda Poonacha 4–6, 6–4, [12–10] in the final.

== Seeds ==
1. (India) Siddhant Banthia / (Bulgaria) Alexander Donski (champions)
2. (Thailand) Pruchya Isaro / (India) Niki Kaliyanda Poonacha (final)
3. (South Korea) Nam Ji-sung / (Finland) Patrik Niklas-Salminen (semifinals)
4. (India) Jeevan Nedunchezhiyan / (India) Ramkumar Ramanathan (first round)

== Draw ==
Key

- Q = Qualifier
- WC = Wild card
- LL = Lucky loser
- Alt = Alternate
- ITF = ITF entry
- PR = Protected ranking
- SR = Special ranking
- SE = Special exempt
- JE = Junior exempt
- JR = Junior Accelerator Programme entrant
- CO = College Accelerator Programme entrant
- NG = Next Gen Accelerator Program entrant
- w/o = Walkover
- r = Retired
- d = Defaulted

First round
1	(India) S Banthia (Bulgaria) A Donski	6	6
(Philippines) FC Alcantara (Zimbabwe) CJ Lock	2	3
(Bulgaria) D Kuzmanov (Kazakhstan) D Yevseyev	6^{5}	4
WC	(India) D Sharan (India) K Singh	7^{7}	6
4	(India) J Nedunchezhiyan (India) R Ramanathan	4	6	[7]
(United Kingdom) J Clarke (Belgium) M Geerts	6	3	[10]
(Chinese Taipei) T-h Huang (South Korea) U-s Park	6	6
P Bar Biryukov (Italy) A Binda	4	3
(India) A Kalyanpur (Poland) D Michalski	3	4
WC	(India) S Myneni (India) Digvijaypratap Singh	6	6
(Australia) D Sweeny (Japan) S Watanabe	6^{7}	2
3	(South Korea) J-s Nam (Finland) P Niklas-Salminen	7^{9}	6
(United Kingdom) O Crawford (Kazakhstan) G Lomakin	1^{r}
(Switzerland) L Castelnuovo (Japan) R Noguchi	4
(India) SDP Dev (India) Nitin Kumar Sinha	2	1
2	(Thailand) P Isaro (India) N Kaliyanda Poonacha	6	6

Quarterfinals
1	(India) S Banthia (Bulgaria) A Donski	6	6
WC	(India) D Sharan (India) K Singh	3	4
(United Kingdom) J Clarke (Belgium) M Geerts	7	3	[10]
(Chinese Taipei) T-h Huang (South Korea) U-s Park	5	6	[5]
WC	(India) S Myneni (India) D Singh	3	4
3	(South Korea) J-s Nam (Finland) P Niklas-Salminen	6	6
(Switzerland) L Castelnuovo (Japan) R Noguchi	2	2
2	(Thailand) P Isaro (India) N Kaliyanda Poonacha	6	6

Semifinals
1	(India) S Banthia (Bulgaria) A Donski	7^{8}	7^{7}
(United Kingdom) J Clarke (Belgium) M Geerts	6^{6}	6^{3}
3	(South Korea) J-s Nam (Finland) P Niklas-Salminen	6^{3}	4
2	(Thailand) P Isaro (India) N Kaliyanda Poonacha	7^{7}	6

Final
1	(India) S Banthia (Bulgaria) A Donski	4	6	[12]
2	(Thailand) P Isaro (India) N Kaliyanda Poonacha	6	4	[10]
