= 2025 Shenzhen Futian Open – Doubles =

Doubles
- 2025 Shenzhen Futian Open

Final
- Champions: (United States) Nathaniel Lammons (Netherlands) Jean-Julien Rojer
- Runners-up: (New Zealand) Finn Reynolds (New Zealand) James Watt
- Score: 6–7^{(5–7)}, 7–5, [10–4]

Events
Singles	Doubles
Shenzhen Futian Open	· 2026 →

This was the first edition of the tournament.

Nathaniel Lammons and Jean-Julien Rojer won the title after defeating Finn Reynolds and James Watt 6–7^{(5–7)}, 7–5, [10–4] in the final.

== Seeds ==
1. (United States) Nathaniel Lammons / (Netherlands) Jean-Julien Rojer (champions)
2. (New Zealand) Finn Reynolds / (New Zealand) James Watt (final)
3. (Thailand) Pruchya Isaro / (India) Niki Kaliyanda Poonacha (quarterfinals)
4. (Japan) Kaito Uesugi / (Japan) Seita Watanabe (quarterfinals)

== Draw ==
Key

- Q = Qualifier
- WC = Wild card
- LL = Lucky loser
- Alt = Alternate
- ITF = ITF entry
- PR = Protected ranking
- SR = Special ranking
- SE = Special exempt
- JE = Junior exempt
- JR = Junior Accelerator Programme entrant
- CO = College Accelerator Programme entrant
- NG = Next Gen Accelerator Program entrant
- w/o = Walkover
- r = Retired
- d = Defaulted

=== Draw ===
First round
1	(United States) N Lammons (Netherlands) J-J Rojer	7^{7}	6
(Philippines) FC Alcantara (Japan) K Uchida	6^{4}	4
P Bar Biryukov (Kazakhstan) G Lomakin	6	5	[3]
(Japan) Y Shimizu (Japan) N Tajima	4	7	[10]
4	(Japan) K Uesugi (Japan) S Watanabe	4	6	[11]
(Australia) B Bayldon (Australia) O Jasika	6	2	[9]
WC	(China) J Cui (China) R Te	3	2
(Portugal) F Ferreira Silva (Portugal) H Rocha	6	6
WC	(China) Yang Zijiang (China) Zeng Yaojie	4	2
(Chinese Taipei) T-h Huang (China) F Sun	6	6
(India) SDP Dev (India) Nitin Kumar Sinha	3	3
3	(Thailand) P Isaro (India) N Kaliyanda Poonacha	6	6
(Switzerland) L Castelnuovo (China) A Wang	7^{7}	6
(Chinese Taipei) J Jung (India) J Nedunchezhiyan	6^{3}	3
E Agafonov (Uzbekistan) S Fomin	3	2
2	(New Zealand) F Reynolds (New Zealand) J Watt	6	6

Quarterfinals
1	(United States) N Lammons (Netherlands) J-J Rojer	4	7^{7}	[10]
(Japan) Y Shimizu (Japan) N Tajima	6	6^{2}	[7]
4	(Japan) K Uesugi (Japan) S Watanabe	3	5
(Portugal) F Ferreira Silva (Portugal) H Rocha	6	7
(Chinese Taipei) T-h Huang (China) F Sun	6	7^{7}
3	(Thailand) P Isaro (India) N Kaliyanda Poonacha	4	6^{4}
(Switzerland) L Castelnuovo (China) A Wang	3	2
2	(New Zealand) F Reynolds (New Zealand) J Watt	6	6

Semifinals
1	(United States) N Lammons (Netherlands) J-J Rojer	7	6
(Portugal) F Ferreira Silva (Portugal) H Rocha	5	4
(Chinese Taipei) T-h Huang (China) F Sun	3	6^{4}
2	(New Zealand) F Reynolds (New Zealand) J Watt	6	7^{7}

Final
1	(United States) N Lammons (Netherlands) J-J Rojer	6^{5}	7	[10]
2	(New Zealand) F Reynolds (New Zealand) J Watt	7^{7}	5	[4]
