= 2015 Delhi Open – Men's doubles =

Men's doubles
- 2015 Delhi Open

Final
- Champions: (Belarus) Egor Gerasimov (Russia) Alexander Kudryavtsev
- Runners-up: (Italy) Riccardo Ghedin (Japan) Toshihide Matsui
- Score: 6–7^{(5–7)}, 6–4, [10–6]

Events
Singles	men	women
Doubles	men	women
- Delhi Open

Saketh Myneni and Sanam Singh were the defending champions, but lost in the quarterfinals.

Egor Gerasimov and Alexander Kudryavtsev won the title defeating Riccardo Ghedin and Toshihide Matsui the final, 6–7^{(5–7)}, 6–4, [10–6].

== Seeds ==
1. (France) Fabrice Martin / (India) Purav Raja (first round)
2. (Moldova) Radu Albot / (India) Divij Sharan (first round)
3. (Thailand) Sanchai Ratiwatana / (Thailand) Sonchat Ratiwatana (first round)
4. (Chinese Taipei) Chen Ti / (Spain) Enrique López-Pérez (quarterfinals)

== Draw ==
Key

- Q = Qualifier
- WC = Wild card
- LL = Lucky loser
- Alt = Alternate
- ITF = ITF entry
- PR = Protected ranking
- SR = Special ranking
- SE = Special exempt
- JE = Junior exempt
- JR = Junior Accelerator Programme entrant
- CO = College Accelerator Programme entrant
- NG = Next Gen Accelerator Program entrant
- w/o = Walkover
- r = Retired
- d = Defaulted

First round
1	(France) F Martin (India) P Raja	4	5
(India) S Myneni (India) S Singh	6	7
(Belarus) E Gerasimov (Russia) A Kudryavtsev	7^{7}	6^{5}	[11]
(India) S Devvarman (India) J Nedunchezhiyan	6^{4}	7^{7}	[9]
4	(Chinese Taipei) T Chen (Spain) E López-Pérez	7	6
(Belgium) K Coppejans (Australia) L Saville	5	4
(Australia) A Bolt (Australia) A Whittington	6	6
(Belgium) R Bemelmans (Serbia) I Bozoljac	3	2
(Croatia) T Androić (Serbia) P Krstin	7^{7}	4	[10]
WC	(India) VS Prashanth (India) R Ramanathan	6^{4}	6	[8]
(Italy) R Ghedin (Japan) T Matsui	6	6
3	(Thailand) Sa Ratiwatana (Thailand) So Ratiwatana	3	4
(Croatia) D Marcan (Croatia) A Šančić	7^{7}	6
WC	(India) C Sood (India) L Sood	6^{4}	3
WC	(India) S Balaji (India) V Vardhan	6	7
2	(Moldova) R Albot (India) D Sharan	2	5

Quarterfinals
(India) S Myneni (India) S Singh	5	6^{4}
(Belarus) E Gerasimov (Russia) A Kudryavtsev	7	7^{7}
4	(Chinese Taipei) T Chen (Spain) E López-Pérez	6^{2}	3
(Australia) A Bolt (Australia) A Whittington	7^{7}	6
(Croatia) T Androić (Serbia) P Krstin	2	1
(Italy) R Ghedin (Japan) T Matsui	6	6
(Croatia) D Marcan (Croatia) A Šančić	1	1
WC	(India) S Balaji (India) V Vardhan	6	6

Semifinals
(Belarus) E Gerasimov (Russia) A Kudryavtsev	6	7^{7}
(Australia) A Bolt (Australia) A Whittington	3	6^{1}
(Italy) R Ghedin (Japan) T Matsui	5	6	[10]
WC	(India) S Balaji (India) V Vardhan	7	4	[5]

Final
(Belarus) E Gerasimov (Russia) A Kudryavtsev	6^{5}	6	[10]
(Italy) R Ghedin (Japan) T Matsui	7^{7}	4	[6]
