= 2015 Emami Kolkata Open ATP Challenger Tour – Singles =

Singles
- 2015 Emami Kolkata Open ATP Challenger Tour

Final
- Champion: (Moldova) Radu Albot
- Runner-up: (Australia) James Duckworth
- Score: 7–6^{(7–0)}, 6–1

Events
Singles	Doubles
- Emami Kolkata Open ATP Challenger Tour

Ilija Bozoljac was the defending champion, but lost in the first round.

Radu Albot won the title, defeating James Duckworth in the final, 7–6^{(7–0)}, 6–1.

== Seeds ==
1. (Australia) James Duckworth (final)
2. (Russia) Alexander Kudryavtsev (quarterfinals)
3. (Belgium) Ruben Bemelmans (semifinals)
4. (India) Somdev Devvarman (first round)
5. (Australia) Luke Saville (first round)
6. (Moldova) Radu Albot (champion)
7. (Australia) Alex Bolt (second round, withdrew)
8. (Belgium) Kimmer Coppejans (second round)

== Draw ==
Key

- Q = Qualifier
- WC = Wild card
- LL = Lucky loser
- Alt = Alternate
- ITF = ITF entry
- PR = Protected ranking
- SR = Special ranking
- SE = Special exempt
- JE = Junior exempt
- JR = Junior Accelerator Programme entrant
- CO = College Accelerator Programme entrant
- NG = Next Gen Accelerator Program entrant
- w/o = Walkover
- r = Retired
- d = Defaulted

=== Finals ===
Semifinals
1	(Australia) James Duckworth	2	6	6
3	(Belgium) Ruben Bemelmans	6	3	1
(Chinese Taipei) Chen Ti	4	6	2
6	(Moldova) Radu Albot	6	2	6

Final
1	(Australia) James Duckworth	6^{0}	1
6	(Moldova) Radu Albot	7^{7}	6

=== Top half ===
First round
1	(Australia) J Duckworth	6	3	6
Q	(India) VS Prashanth	3	6	3
WC	(India) J Nedunchezhiyan	6	2	0
WC	(India) S Singh	2	6	6
WC	(India) S Nagal	5	5
(Belarus) E Gerasimov	7	7
(India) S Myneni	5	4
7	(Australia) A Bolt	7	6
3	(Belgium) R Bemelmans	6	1	6
(Egypt) M Safwat	1	6	3
Q	(Germany) K Krawietz	6	7^{7}
Q	(India) Vinayak Sharma Kaza	2	6^{4}
(India) S Balaji	5	5
Q	(Germany) R Becker	7	7
(Croatia) T Androić	2	4
8	(Belgium) K Coppejans	6	6

Second round
1	(Australia) J Duckworth	6	6
WC	(India) S Singh	2	1
(Belarus) E Gerasimov	w/o
7	(Australia) A Bolt
3	(Belgium) R Bemelmans	3	6	6
Q	(Germany) K Krawietz	6	2	3
Q	(Germany) R Becker	4	6	6
8	(Belgium) K Coppejans	6	3	3

Quarterfinals
1	(Australia) J Duckworth	6	6
(Belarus) E Gerasimov	4	2
3	(Belgium) R Bemelmans	6^{5}	7^{10}	6
Q	(Germany) R Becker	7^{7}	6^{8}	2

Semifinals
1	(Australia) J Duckworth	2	6	6
3	(Belgium) R Bemelmans	6	3	1

=== Bottom half ===
First round
5	(Australia) L Saville	3	6	2
(Chinese Taipei) T Chen	6	3	6
(Serbia) I Bozoljac	6	6^{4}	3
(Portugal) FF Silva	4	7^{7}	6
(Serbia) P Krstin	6	3	1^{r}
(Serbia) M Janković	4	6	3
(India) R Ramanathan	4	6	6
4	(India) S Devvarman	6	3	4
6	(Moldova) R Albot	7	4	6
(Croatia) N Mektić	5	6	3
(Spain) E López-Pérez	2	2
(India) Y Bhambri	6	6
(Chinese Taipei) T-h Yang	6^{5}	6	6
(Spain) D Pérez Sanz	7^{7}	1	2
WC	(India) P Gunneswaran	3	6^{7}
2	(Russia) A Kudryavtsev	6	7^{9}

Second round
(Chinese Taipei) T Chen	6	4	6
(Portugal) FF Silva	0	6	2
(Serbia) M Janković	1	7	5
(India) R Ramanathan	6	5	7
6	(Moldova) R Albot	6	2	6
(India) Y Bhambri	3	6	1
(Chinese Taipei) T-h Yang	7^{9}	1	0
2	(Russia) A Kudryavtsev	6^{7}	6	6

Quarterfinals
(Chinese Taipei) T Chen	6	3	7^{7}
(India) R Ramanathan	4	6	6^{5}
6	(Moldova) R Albot	7^{7}	6
2	(Russia) A Kudryavtsev	6^{5}	3

Semifinals
(Chinese Taipei) T Chen	4	6	2
6	(Moldova) R Albot	6	2	6
