= 2025 Delhi Open – Doubles =

Doubles
- 2025 Delhi Open

Final
- Champions: (Japan) Masamichi Imamura (Japan) Rio Noguchi
- Runners-up: (India) Niki Kaliyanda Poonacha (Zimbabwe) Courtney John Lock
- Score: 6–4, 6–3

Events
Singles	Doubles
- Delhi Open

Piotr Matuszewski and Matthew Romios were the defending champions but chose not to defend their title.

Masamichi Imamura and Rio Noguchi won the title after defeating Niki Kaliyanda Poonacha and Courtney John Lock 6–4, 6–3 in the final.

== Seeds ==
1. (Australia) Blake Ellis / (Australia) Tristan Schoolkate (withdrew)
2. (India) Niki Kaliyanda Poonacha / (Zimbabwe) Courtney John Lock (final)
3. (United Kingdom) Jay Clarke / (Denmark) Johannes Ingildsen (semifinals)
4. (France) Corentin Denolly / (France) Sascha Gueymard Wayenburg (first round)

== Draw ==
Key

- Q = Qualifier
- WC = Wild card
- LL = Lucky loser
- Alt = Alternate
- ITF = ITF entry
- PR = Protected ranking
- SR = Special ranking
- SE = Special exempt
- JE = Junior exempt
- JR = Junior Accelerator Programme entrant
- CO = College Accelerator Programme entrant
- NG = Next Gen Accelerator Program entrant
- w/o = Walkover
- r = Retired
- d = Defaulted

=== Draw ===
First round
Alt	(India) Parth Aggarwal (India) Sidharth Rawat	1	3
(France) E Couacaud (Canada) K Stevenson	6	6
(Italy) E Dalla Valle (Ukraine) O Ovcharenko	6^{5}	2
(Japan) M Imamura (Japan) R Noguchi	7^{7}	6
4	(France) C Denolly (France) S Gueymard Wayenburg	5	5
(Czech Republic) H Bartoň (Czech Republic) V Kopřiva	7	7
Alt	(South Africa) Kris van Wyk (Ukraine) Eric Vanshelboim	6	6
WC	(India) SDP Dev (India) Sai Karteek Reddy Ganta	4	3
(Denmark) A Holmgren (Denmark) E Møller	2	2
PR	(Belgium) K Coppejans (Belgium) M Geerts	6	6
PR	(India) S Banthia (India) Parikshit Somani	3	2
3	(United Kingdom) J Clarke (Denmark) J Ingildsen	6	6
WC	(India) R Ramanathan (India) K Singh	6	1	[7]
(Japan) S Mochizuki (Japan) K Uesugi	3	6	[10]
(Czech Republic) M Gengel (Czech Republic) D Svrčina	6	6^{5}	[6]
2	(India) N Kaliyanda Poonacha (Zimbabwe) CJ Lock	2	7^{7}	[10]

Quarterfinals
(France) E Couacaud (Canada) K Stevenson	1	4
(Japan) M Imamura (Japan) R Noguchi	6	6
(Czech Republic) H Bartoň (Czech Republic) V Kopřiva	6	6
Alt	(South Africa) K van Wyk (Ukraine) E Vanshelboim	4	1
PR	(Belgium) K Coppejans (Belgium) M Geerts	6	2	[5]
3	(United Kingdom) J Clarke (Denmark) J Ingildsen	4	6	[10]
(Japan) S Mochizuki (Japan) K Uesugi	3	6	[5]
2	(India) N Kaliyanda Poonacha (Zimbabwe) CJ Lock	6	2	[10]

Semifinals
(Japan) M Imamura (Japan) R Noguchi	1	6	[12]
(Czech Republic) H Bartoň (Czech Republic) V Kopřiva	6	4	[10]
3	(United Kingdom) J Clarke (Denmark) J Ingildsen	2	6^{1}
2	(India) N Kaliyanda Poonacha (Zimbabwe) CJ Lock	6	7^{7}

Final
(Japan) M Imamura (Japan) R Noguchi	6	6
2	(India) N Kaliyanda Poonacha (Zimbabwe) CJ Lock	4	3
