= 2015 Tallahassee Tennis Challenger – Doubles =

Doubles
- 2015 Tallahassee Tennis Challenger

Final
- Champions: (United States) Dennis Novikov (Chile) Julio Peralta
- Runners-up: (India) Somdev Devvarman (India) Sanam Singh
- Score: 6–2, 6–4

Events
Singles	Doubles
- Tallahassee Tennis Challenger

Ryan Agar and Sebastian Bader were the defending champions, but they did not participate this year.

Dennis Novikov and Julio Peralta won the title, defeating Somdev Devvarman and Sanam Singh in the final, 6–2, 6–4.

== Seeds ==
1. (United Kingdom) Ken Skupski / (United Kingdom) Neal Skupski (first round)
2. (United States) Kevin King / (South Africa) Dean O'Brien (first round)
3. (Argentina) Guillermo Durán / (Argentina) Renzo Olivo (quarterfinals)
4. (United States) James Cerretani / (Canada) Frank Dancevic (first round)

== Draw ==
Key

- Q = Qualifier
- WC = Wild card
- LL = Lucky loser
- Alt = Alternate
- ITF = ITF entry
- PR = Protected ranking
- SR = Special ranking
- SE = Special exempt
- JE = Junior exempt
- JR = Junior Accelerator Programme entrant
- CO = College Accelerator Programme entrant
- NG = Next Gen Accelerator Program entrant
- w/o = Walkover
- r = Retired
- d = Defaulted

First round
1	(United Kingdom) K Skupski (United Kingdom) N Skupski	6	6^{5}	[5]
(United Kingdom) L Bambridge (United Kingdom) L Broady	3	7^{7}	[10]
(Australia) J Kubler (United Kingdom) A Ward	2	4
(United States) A Kuznetsov (United States) T Sandgren	6	6
4	(United States) J Cerretani (Canada) F Dancevic	3	6	[10]
PR	(United States) S Bangoura (New Zealand) J Statham	6	3	[12]
WC	(Zimbabwe) B Lock (Mexico) Marco Aurelio Núñez	2	3
(United States) D Novikov (Chile) J Peralta	6	6
WC	(United States) S Kozlov (United States) R Williams	6	3	[2]
(Argentina) F Argüello (Argentina) A Collarini	4	6	[10]
(Australia) C Ball (Australia) M Reid	4	4
3	(Argentina) G Durán (Argentina) R Olivo	6	6
WC	(United States) Terrell Whitehurst (United States) Terrence Whitehurst	5	5
(Barbados) D King (United States) M Seeberger	7	7
(India) S Devvarman (India) S Singh	6	6
2	(United States) K King (South Africa) D O'Brien	3	2

Quarterfinals
(United Kingdom) L Bambridge (United Kingdom) L Broady	7^{8}	1	[7]
(United States) A Kuznetsov (United States) T Sandgren	6^{6}	6	[10]
PR	(United States) S Bangoura (New Zealand) J Statham	2	6^{4}
(United States) D Novikov (Chile) J Peralta	6	7^{7}
(Argentina) F Argüello (Argentina) A Collarini	7	6
3	(Argentina) G Durán (Argentina) R Olivo	5	3
(Barbados) D King (United States) M Seeberger	3	6	[6]
(India) S Devvarman (India) S Singh	6	4	[10]

Semifinals
(United States) A Kuznetsov (United States) T Sandgren	1	2
(United States) D Novikov (Chile) J Peralta	6	6
(Argentina) F Argüello (Argentina) A Collarini	6^{10}	4
(India) S Devvarman (India) S Singh	7^{12}	6

Final
(United States) D Novikov (Chile) J Peralta	6	6
(India) S Devvarman (India) S Singh	2	4
