= 2025 Shenzhen Futian Open – Singles =

Singles
- 2025 Shenzhen Futian Open

Final
- Champion: (France) Kyrian Jacquet
- Runner-up: (China) Zhou Yi
- Score: 6–3, 6–3

Events
Singles	Doubles
Shenzhen Futian Open	· 2026 →

This was the first edition of the tournament.

Kyrian Jacquet won the title after defeating Zhou Yi 6–3, 6–3 in the final.

== Seeds ==
1. (Portugal) Henrique Rocha (second round)
2. (France) Harold Mayot (quarterfinals)
3. (France) Kyrian Jacquet (champion)
4. (Australia) Jason Kubler (first round)
5. (Australia) James McCabe (first round)
6. (Japan) Sho Shimabukuro (semifinals)
7. (Japan) Yuta Shimizu (first round)
8. (Japan) Rio Noguchi (first round)

== Draw ==
Key

- Q = Qualifier
- WC = Wild card
- LL = Lucky loser
- Alt = Alternate
- ITF = ITF entry
- PR = Protected ranking
- SR = Special ranking
- SE = Special exempt
- JE = Junior exempt
- JR = Junior Accelerator Programme entrant
- CO = College Accelerator Programme entrant
- NG = Next Gen Accelerator Program entrant
- w/o = Walkover
- r = Retired
- d = Defaulted

=== Finals ===
Semifinals
WC	(China) Cui Jie	7^{8}	4	5
(China) Zhou Yi	6^{6}	6	7
3	(France) Kyrian Jacquet	7	4	6
6	(Japan) Sho Shimabukuro	5	6	2

Final
(China) Zhou Yi	3	3
3	(France) Kyrian Jacquet	6	6

=== Top half ===
First round
1	(Portugal) H Rocha	6	6
Q	(Switzerland) L Castelnuovo	3	4
Q	(China) Y Mo	6	6
(Uzbekistan) K Sultanov	1	2
P Kotov	6	6
WC	(China) Zhang Tianhui	4	4
WC	(China) J Cui	6	6
5	(Australia) J McCabe	4	4
4	(Australia) J Kubler	2	5
(China) F Sun	6	7
(South Korea) H Chung	7^{7}	3
WC	(China) R Te	6^{4}	0^{r}
(China) Y Zhou	6	6
Q	(China) Wang Xiaofei	1	2
Q	(China) A Wang	3	7	6
7	(Japan) Y Shimizu	6	5	3

Second round
1	(Portugal) H Rocha	5	4
Q	(China) Y Mo	7	6
P Kotov	2	6	4
WC	(China) J Cui	6	3	6
(China) F Sun	6	7^{7}
(South Korea) H Chung	3	6^{5}
(China) Y Zhou	w/o
Q	(China) A Wang

Quarterfinals
Q	(China) Y Mo	4	1
WC	(China) J Cui	6	6
(China) F Sun	6^{5}	3
(China) Y Zhou	7^{7}	6

Semifinals
WC	(China) J Cui	7^{8}	4	5
(China) Y Zhou	6^{6}	6	7

=== Bottom half ===
First round
8	(Japan) R Noguchi	7	4	3
(Japan) K Uchida	5	6	6
(Thailand) K Samrej	4	6^{7}
PR	(Chinese Taipei) J Jung	6	7^{9}
(Australia) O Jasika	7^{7}	1
(Japan) Y Uchiyama	6^{5}	0^{r}
Q	(India) SDP Dev	1	4
3	(France) K Jacquet	6	6
6	(Japan) S Shimabukuro	6	7
P Bar Biryukov	4	5
Q	(Uzbekistan) S Fomin	6	6
(France) A Weber	4	4
JR	(Japan) Naoya Honda	6	4	2
(Portugal) F Ferreira Silva	3	6	6
(South Africa) L Harris	6^{2}	2
2	(France) H Mayot	7^{7}	6

Second round
(Japan) K Uchida	6	2
PR	(Chinese Taipei) J Jung	3	0^{r}
(Australia) O Jasika	6	3	2
3	(France) K Jacquet	4	6	6
6	(Japan) S Shimabukuro	4	7	7
Q	(Uzbekistan) S Fomin	6	5	5
(Portugal) F Ferreira Silva	4	2
2	(France) H Mayot	6	6

Quarterfinals
(Japan) K Uchida	3	6	3
3	(France) K Jacquet	6	4	6
6	(Japan) S Shimabukuro	6	6
2	(France) H Mayot	2	3

Semifinals
3	(France) K Jacquet	7	4	6
6	(Japan) S Shimabukuro	5	6	2
