= 2025 Delhi Open =

- Date: 10 – 16 February
- Edition: 5th
- Category: ATP Challenger Tour
- Surface: Hard
- Location: New Delhi, India

Champions

Singles
- (France) Kyrian Jacquet

Doubles
- (Japan) Masamichi Imamura / (Japan) Rio Noguchi
← 2024 ·	Delhi Open	· 2026 →

The 2025 Delhi Open was a professional tennis tournament played on outdoor hard courts. It was the fifth edition of the tournament. It was part of the 2025 ATP Challenger Tour. It took place in New Delhi, India from 10 to 16 February 2025.

== Singles main draw entrants ==
=== Seeds ===
Country	Player	Rank^{1}	Seed
CZE	Vít Kopřiva	128	1
GBR	Billy Harris	129	2
AUS	Tristan Schoolkate	135	3
~~RSA~~	~~Lloyd Harris~~	~~144~~	~~4~~
DEN	Elmer Møller	152	5
JPN	Shintaro Mochizuki	181	6
JPN	Sho Shimabukuro	193	7
KAZ	Timofey Skatov	202	8

- ^{1} Rankings as of 3 February 2025.

=== Other entrants ===
The following players received wildcards into the singles main draw:

- (India) Ramkumar Ramanathan
- (India) Mukund Sasikumar
- (India) Karan Singh

The following player received entry into the singles main draw as a special exempt:

- (Sweden) Elias Ymer

The following player received entry into the singles main draw as an alternate:

- (Ukraine) Oleksandr Ovcharenko

The following players received entry from the qualifying draw:

- Egor Agafonov
- (Czech Republic) Hynek Bartoň
- (United States) Andre Ilagan
- (Japan) Masamichi Imamura
- (Ukraine) Eric Vanshelboim
- (Czech Republic) Jiří Veselý

The following player received entry as a lucky loser:

- (France) Sascha Gueymard Wayenburg

== Champions ==
=== Singles ===
- (France) Kyrian Jacquet def. (United Kingdom) Billy Harris 6–4, 6–2.

=== Doubles ===
- (Japan) Masamichi Imamura / (Japan) Rio Noguchi def. (India) Niki Kaliyanda Poonacha / (Zimbabwe) Courtney John Lock 6–4, 6–3.
