= 2016 Delhi Open – Men's singles =

Men's singles
- 2016 Delhi Open

Final
- Champion: (France) Stéphane Robert
- Runner-up: (India) Saketh Myneni
- Score: 6–3 , 6–0

Events
Singles	men	women
Doubles	men	women
- Delhi Open

Somdev Devvarman was the defending champion, but chose to compete in Delray Beach instead.

Stéphane Robert won the title, defeating Saketh Myneni in the final 6–3, 6–0 .

== Seeds ==
1. (India) Yuki Bhambri (first round)
2. (Belgium) Kimmer Coppejans (semifinals)
3. (France) Stéphane Robert (champion)
4. (India) Saketh Myneni (final)
5. (Belgium) Yannick Mertens (first round)
6. (China) Zhang Ze (first round)
7. (China) Bai Yan (second round, retired)
8. (Chinese Taipei) Chen Ti (second round)

== Draw ==
Key

- Q = Qualifier
- WC = Wild card
- LL = Lucky loser
- Alt = Alternate
- ITF = ITF entry
- PR = Protected ranking
- SR = Special ranking
- SE = Special exempt
- JE = Junior exempt
- JR = Junior Accelerator Programme entrant
- CO = College Accelerator Programme entrant
- NG = Next Gen Accelerator Program entrant
- w/o = Walkover
- r = Retired
- d = Defaulted

=== Finals ===
Semifinals
(Italy) Flavio Cipolla	3	2
3	(France) Stéphane Robert	6	6
4	(India) Saketh Myneni	6	6
2	(Belgium) Kimmer Coppejans	3	2

Final
3	(France) Stéphane Robert	6	6
4	(India) Saketh Myneni	3	0

=== Top half ===
First round
1	(India) Y Bhambri	4	6^{4}
(Belgium) J De Loore	6	7^{7}
(Belgium) N Desein	4	6	1
(Italy) F Cipolla	6	1	6
WC	(India) V S Prashanth	2	2
(Chinese Taipei) J Wang	6	6
(Netherlands) S Griekspoor	6^{5}	3
8	(Chinese Taipei) T Chen	7^{7}	6
3	(France) S Robert	6	1
(India) S Singh	4	0^{r}
(Australia) B Mitchell	4
Q	(Japan) K Takeuchi	1^{r}
(Japan) T Niki	6^{4}	6	3
(Kazakhstan) D Popko	7^{7}	3	6
(Italy) R Marcora	5	7^{7}	6
6	(China) Z Zhang	7	6^{3}	1

Second round
(Belgium) J De Loore	4	6^{2}
(Italy) F Cipolla	6	7^{7}
(Chinese Taipei) J Wang	6	6
8	(Chinese Taipei) T Chen	3	2
3	(France) S Robert	7^{7}	7
(Australia) B Mitchell	6^{4}	5
(Kazakhstan) D Popko	7^{8}	6
(Italy) R Marcora	6^{6}	3

Quarterfinals
(Italy) F Cipolla	6	6
(Chinese Taipei) J Wang	3	2
3	(France) S Robert	6	6
(Kazakhstan) D Popko	2	0

Semifinals
(Italy) F Cipolla	3	2
3	(France) S Robert	6	6

=== Bottom half ===
First round
5	(Belgium) Y Mertens	6	3	4
(China) Z Li	4	6	6
Q	(India) V Vardhan	6	6
WC	(India) A Kalyanpur	1	1
(Australia) M Barton	6	6
(Republic of Ireland) S Barry	3	2
(Italy) A Bega	3	2
4	(India) S Myneni	6	6
7	(China) Y Bai	7^{7}	6
WC	(India) S Balaji	6^{4}	3
WC	(India) P Gunneswaran	6	6
Q	(India) J Nedunchezhiyan	4	4
Q	(Italy) Francesco Vilardo	1	4
(France) M Janvier	6	6
(South Korea) D-h Lee	6	2	3
2	(Belgium) K Coppejans	2	6	6

Second round
(China) Z Li	3	6	6
Q	(India) V Vardhan	6	3	3
(Australia) M Barton	3	4
4	(India) S Myneni	6	6
7	(China) Y Bai
WC	(India) P Gunneswaran	w/o
(France) M Janvier	2	4
2	(Belgium) K Coppejans	6	6

Quarterfinals
(China) Z Li	4	1
4	(India) S Myneni	6	6
WC	(India) P Gunneswaran	3	2
2	(Belgium) K Coppejans	6	6

Semifinals
4	(India) S Myneni	6	6
2	(Belgium) K Coppejans	3	2
