= 2014 State Bank of India ATP Challenger Tour – Doubles =

Doubles
- 2014 State Bank of India ATP Challenger Tour

Final
- Champions: (India) Saketh Myneni (India) Sanam Singh
- Runners-up: (India) Divij Sharan (India) Vishnu Vardhan
- Score: 6–3, 3–6, [10–4]

Events
Singles	Doubles
- State Bank of India ATP Challenger Tour

This was the first edition of the tournament.

Myneni and Singh won the title, defeating Divij Sharan and Vishnu Vardhan in the final, 6–3, 3–6, [10–4].

== Seeds ==
1. (Thailand) Sanchai Ratiwatana / (Thailand) Sonchat Ratiwatana (first round)
2. (India) Yuki Bhambri / (New Zealand) Michael Venus (first round)
3. (India) Somdev Devvarman / (India) Purav Raja (first round)
4. (Philippines) Ruben Gonzales / (New Zealand) Artem Sitak (second round)

== Draw ==
Key

- Q = Qualifier
- WC = Wild card
- LL = Lucky loser
- Alt = Alternate
- ITF = ITF entry
- PR = Protected ranking
- SR = Special ranking
- SE = Special exempt
- JE = Junior exempt
- JR = Junior Accelerator Programme entrant
- CO = College Accelerator Programme entrant
- NG = Next Gen Accelerator Program entrant
- w/o = Walkover
- r = Retired
- d = Defaulted

=== Draw ===
First round
1	(Thailand) Sa Ratiwatana (Thailand) So Ratiwatana	4	1
(France) L Pouille (Japan) G Soeda	6	6
WC	(India) R Ramanathan (India) Karunday Singh	2	6	[8]
WC	(India) S Myneni (India) S Singh	6	4	[10]
4	(Philippines) R Gonzales (New Zealand) A Sitak	6	6
(Switzerland) M Chiudinelli (Canada) S Diez	0	3
(Spain) G Granollers (Spain) A Menéndez-Maceiras	6	3	[10]
(Moldova) R Albot (Ukraine) I Marchenko	1	6	[6]
(Chinese Taipei) H-y Peng (Chinese Taipei) Yang T-h	2	6	[10]
PR	(South Africa) R Roelofse (South Africa) I van der Merwe	4	[6]
WC	(India) D Sharan (India) V Vardhan	7^{7}	7^{7}
4	(India) S Devvarman (India) P Raja	6^{3}	6^{1}
(Russia) V Baluda (Russia) A Kudryavtsev	6	6^{5}	[12]
(Chinese Taipei) T Chen (China) Z Zhang	1	7^{7}	[10]
(Kazakhstan) A Nedovesov (Slovenia) B Rola	6	5	[10]
2	(India) Y Bhambri (New Zealand) M Venus	3	7	[7]

Quarterfinals
(France) L Pouille (Japan) G Soeda	3	3
WC	(India) S Myneni (India) S Singh	6	6
4	(Philippines) R Gonzales (New Zealand) A Sitak	5	4
(Spain) G Granollers (Spain) A Menéndez-Maceiras	7	6
(Chinese Taipei) H-y Peng (Chinese Taipei) Yang T-h	3	6^{4}
WC	(India) D Sharan (India) V Vardhan	6	7^{7}
(Russia) V Baluda (Russia) A Kudryavtsev	3	3
(Kazakhstan) A Nedovesov (Slovenia) B Rola	6	6

Semifinals
WC	(India) S Myneni (India) S Singh	6	6^{5}	[10]
(Spain) G Granollers (Spain) A Menéndez-Maceiras	3	7^{7}	[7]
WC	(India) D Sharan (India) V Vardhan	6	6
(Kazakhstan) A Nedovesov (Slovenia) B Rola	4	4

Final
WC	(India) S Myneni (India) S Singh	6	3	[10]
WC	(India) D Sharan (India) V Vardhan	3	6	[4]
