= 2015 Emami Kolkata Open ATP Challenger Tour =

- Date: 23–28 February
- Edition: 2nd
- Draw: 32S / 16D
- Prize money: $50,000
- Surface: Hard
- Location: Kolkata, India

Champions

Singles
- (Moldova) Radu Albot

Doubles
- (India) Somdev Devvarman / (India) Jeevan Nedunchezhiyan
← 2014 ·	Emami Kolkata Open ATP Challenger Tour	· 2016 →

The 2015 Emami Kolkata Open ATP Challenger Tour was a professional tennis tournament played on hard courts. It was the 2nd edition of tournament which was part of the 2015 ATP Challenger Tour. It took place in Kolkata, India between 23 and 28 February 2015.

== Singles main-draw entrants ==
=== Seeds ===
Country	Player	Rank^{1}	Seed
AUS	James Duckworth	112	1
RUS	Alexander Kudryavtsev	129	2
BEL	Ruben Bemelmans	144	3
IND	Somdev Devvarman	153	4
AUS	Luke Saville	161	5
MDA	Radu Albot	165	6
AUS	Alex Bolt	167	7
BEL	Kimmer Coppejans	183	8

- ^{1} Rankings are as of 16 February 2015

=== Other entrants ===
The following players received wildcards into the singles main draw:

- (India) Jeevan Nedunchezhiyan
- (India) Sanam Singh
- (India) Sumit Nagal
- (India) Prajnesh Gunneswaran

The following players received entry from the qualifying draw:

- (Germany) Richard Becker
- (India) Vijay Sundar Prashanth
- (Germany) Kevin Krawietz
- (India) Vinayak Sharma Kaza

== Champions ==
=== Singles ===
- (Moldova) Radu Albot def. (Australia) James Duckworth, 7–6^{(7–0)}, 6–1

=== Doubles ===
- (India) Somdev Devvarman / (India) Jeevan Nedunchezhiyan def. (Australia) James Duckworth / (Australia) Luke Saville by walkover
