= 2015 Tallahassee Tennis Challenger – Singles =

Singles
- 2015 Tallahassee Tennis Challenger

Final
- Champion: (Argentina) Facundo Argüello
- Runner-up: (United States) Frances Tiafoe
- Score: 2–6, 7–6^{(7–5)}, 6–4

Events
Singles	Doubles
- Tallahassee Tennis Challenger

Robby Ginepri was the defending champion, but did not participate.

Facundo Argüello won the title, defeating Frances Tiafoe in the final, 2–6, 7–6^{(7–5)}, 6–4.

== Seeds ==
1. (Argentina) Facundo Bagnis (first round)
2. (United States) Austin Krajicek (first round)
3. (Canada) Frank Dancevic (first round)
4. (Australia) Jason Kubler (second round)
5. (Argentina) Facundo Argüello (champion)
6. (United States) Bjorn Fratangelo (quarterfinals)
7. (India) Somdev Devvarman (second round)
8. (Republic of Ireland) James McGee (second round)

== Draw ==
Key

- Q = Qualifier
- WC = Wild card
- LL = Lucky loser
- Alt = Alternate
- ITF = ITF entry
- PR = Protected ranking
- SR = Special ranking
- SE = Special exempt
- JE = Junior exempt
- JR = Junior Accelerator Programme entrant
- CO = College Accelerator Programme entrant
- NG = Next Gen Accelerator Program entrant
- w/o = Walkover
- r = Retired
- d = Defaulted

=== Finals ===
Semifinals
SE	(United States) Frances Tiafoe	1	6	7^{7}
PR	(United States) Tennys Sandgren	6	4	6^{1}
(United States) Jared Donaldson	3	2
5	(Argentina) Facundo Argüello	6	6

Final
SE	(United States) Frances Tiafoe	6	6^{5}	4
5	(Argentina) Facundo Argüello	2	7^{7}	6

=== Top half ===
First round
1/Q	(Argentina) F Bagnis	6	6^{5}	4
SE	(United States) F Tiafoe	1	7^{7}	6
Q	(New Zealand) J Statham	2	7^{8}	3
WC	(United States) Jean-Yves Aubone	6	6^{6}	6
(Ecuador) G Escobar	4	2
(Ecuador) E Gómez	6	6
(United States) K King	6^{3}	2
7	(India) S Devvarman	7^{7}	6
3	(Canada) F Dancevic	6	2	1
PR	(United States) T Sandgren	4	6	6
(United States) R Williams	2	7	6^{7}
(Argentina) R Olivo	6	5	7^{9}
(United Kingdom) L Broady	4	6	7^{7}
Q	(United States) S Bangoura	6	3	6^{1}
(United States) A Kuznetsov	6^{2}	4
6	(United States) B Fratangelo	7^{7}	6

Second round
SE	(United States) F Tiafoe	6	3	6
WC	(United States) J-Y Aubone	4	6	1
(Ecuador) E Gómez	6	5	6
7	(India) S Devvarman	4	7	4
PR	(United States) T Sandgren	7^{11}	6
(Argentina) R Olivo	6^{9}	2
(United Kingdom) L Broady	5	2
6	(United States) B Fratangelo	7	6

Quarterfinals
SE	(United States) F Tiafoe	6	7^{7}
(Ecuador) E Gómez	1	6^{2}
PR	(United States) T Sandgren	6	6
6	(United States) B Fratangelo	2	2

Semifinals
SE	(United States) F Tiafoe	1	6	7^{7}
PR	(United States) T Sandgren	6	3	6^{1}

=== Bottom half ===
First round
8	(Republic of Ireland) J McGee	6	6
(Barbados) D King	2	4
(United States) J Donaldson	2	6	6
WC	(Zimbabwe) B Lock	6	4	2
Q	(United States) Mico Santiago	2	1
(France) V Millot	6	6
(United Kingdom) A Ward	6^{2}	6	3
4	(Australia) J Kubler	7^{7}	4	6
5	(Argentina) F Argüello	6	7
WC	(United States) S Kozlov	4	5
WC	(United States) T Paul	2	6	6
(Ecuador) G Lapentti	6	3	0
(Venezuela) R Rodríguez	2	4
(United States) D Novikov	6	6
(United States) M Krueger	7	6
2	(United States) A Krajicek	5	3

Second round
8	(Republic of Ireland) J McGee	7	4	4
(United States) J Donaldson	5	6	6
(France) V Millot	3	7	7^{7}
4	(Australia) J Kubler	6	5	6^{5}
5	(Argentina) F Argüello	0	6	6
WC	(United States) T Paul	6	3	2
(United States) D Novikov	1	4
(United States) M Krueger	6	6

Quarterfinals
(United States) J Donaldson	6	7^{7}
(France) V Millot	4	6^{4}
5	(Argentina) F Argüello	4	6	6
(United States) M Krueger	6	3	4

Semifinals
(United States) J Donaldson	3	2
5	(Argentina) F Argüello	6	6
