= 2025 Shenzhen Futian Open =

- Date: 13 – 19 October
- Edition: 1st
- Surface: Hard
- Location: Shenzhen, China

Champions

Singles
- (France) Kyrian Jacquet

Doubles
- (United States) Nathaniel Lammons / (Netherlands) Jean-Julien Rojer
Shenzhen Futian Open	· 2026 →

The 2025 Shenzhen Futian Open was a professional tennis tournament played on hardcourts. It was the first edition of the tournament which was part of the 2025 ATP Challenger Tour. It took place in Shenzhen, China between 13 and 19 October 2025.

== Singles main-draw entrants ==
=== Seeds ===
Country	Player	Rank^{1}	Seed
POR	Henrique Rocha	163	1
FRA	Harold Mayot	172	2
FRA	Kyrian Jacquet	182	3
AUS	Jason Kubler	190	4
AUS	James McCabe	192	5
JPN	Sho Shimabukuro	197	6
JPN	Yuta Shimizu	206	7
JPN	Rio Noguchi	219	8

- ^{1} Rankings are as of 29 September 2025.

=== Other entrants ===
The following players received wildcards into the singles main draw:

- (China) Cui Jie
- (China) Te Rigele
- (China) Zhang Tianhui

The following player received entry into the singles main draw using a protected ranking:

- (Chinese Taipei) Jason Jung

The following player received entry into the singles main draw through the Junior Accelerator programme:

- (Japan) Naoya Honda

The following players received entry from the qualifying draw:

- (Switzerland) Luca Castelnuovo
- (India) S D Prajwal Dev
- (Uzbekistan) Sergey Fomin
- (China) Mo Yecong
- (China) Wang Aoran
- (China) Wang Xiaofei

== Champions ==
=== Singles ===
- (France) Kyrian Jacquet def. (China) Zhou Yi 6–3, 6–3.

=== Doubles ===
- (United States) Nathaniel Lammons / (Netherlands) Jean-Julien Rojer def. (New Zealand) Finn Reynolds / (New Zealand) James Watt 6–7^{(5–7)}, 7–5, [10–4].
