= 2014 State Bank of India ATP Challenger Tour =

- Date: 10–15 February
- Edition: 1st
- Category: ATP Challenger Tour (men)
- Prize money: $50,000
- Surface: Hard
- Location: Kolkata, India

Champions

Singles
- (Serbia) Ilija Bozoljac

Doubles
- (India) Saketh Myneni / (India) Sanam Singh
State Bank of India ATP Challenger Tour	· 2015 →

The 2014 State Bank of India ATP Challenger Tour was a professional tennis tournament played on outdoor hard courts. It is the first edition of the tournament for the men. It was part of the 2014 ATP Challenger Tour. It took place in Kolkata, India, from 10–15 February 2014.

== Singles main draw entrants ==
=== Seeds ===
Country	Player	Rank^{1}	Seed
KAZ	Oleksandr Nedovyesov	95	1
IND	Somdev Devvarman	103	2
RUS	Evgeny Donskoy	130	3
JPN	Go Soeda	138	4
SLO	Blaž Rola	152	5
UKR	Illya Marchenko	162	6
MDA	Radu Albot	168	7
SUI	David Guez	170	8

- ^{1} Rankings as of 3 February 2014

=== Other entrants ===
The following players received wildcards into the singles main draw:

- (India) Somdev Devvarman
- (India) Saketh Myneni
- (India) Vishnu Vardhan
- (India) Sanam Singh

The following players received entry from the qualifying draw:

- (Chinese Taipei) Yang Tsung-hua
- (Portugal) Rui Machado
- (Chinese Taipei) Huang Liang-chi
- (Chinese Taipei) Chen Ti

== Champions ==
=== Singles ===
- (Serbia) Ilija Bozoljac def. (Russia) Evgeny Donskoy, 6–1, 6–1

=== Doubles ===
- (India) Saketh Myneni / (India) Sanam Singh def. (India) Divij Sharan / (India) Vishnu Vardhan, 6–3, 3–6, [10–4]
