= 2015 Tallahassee Tennis Challenger =

- Date: 27 April – 2 May
- Edition: 16th
- Draw: 32S / 16D
- Prize money: $50,000
- Surface: Green clay
- Location: Tallahassee, Florida, United States

Champions

Singles
- (Argentina) Facundo Argüello

Doubles
- (United States) Dennis Novikov / (Chile) Julio Peralta
- Tallahassee Tennis Challenger

The 2015 Tallahassee Tennis Challenger was a professional tennis tournament played on green clay courts. It was the 16th edition of the tournament which was part of the 2015 ATP Challenger Tour. It took place in Tallahassee, Florida, United States between April 27 and May 2, 2015.

== Singles main-draw entrants ==
=== Seeds ===
| Country | Player | Rank^{1} | Seed |
|---|---|---|---|
| ARG | Facundo Bagnis | 90 | 1 |
| USA | Austin Krajicek | 116 | 2 |
| CAN | Frank Dancevic | 141 | 3 |
| AUS | Jason Kubler | 152 | 4 |
| ARG | Facundo Argüello | 164 | 5 |
| USA | Bjorn Fratangelo | 165 | 6 |
| IND | Somdev Devvarman | 168 | 7 |
| IRL | James McGee | 169 | 8 |

- ^{1} Rankings are as of April 20, 2015

=== Other entrants ===
The following players received wildcards into the singles main draw:

- (United States) Jean-Yves Aubone
- (Zimbabwe) Benjamin Lock
- (United States) Stefan Kozlov
- (United States) Tommy Paul

The following players received entry from the qualifying draw:

- (Argentina) Facundo Bagnis
- (United States) Sekou Bangoura
- (United States) Mico Santiago
- (New Zealand) Jose Rubin Statham

== Doubles main-draw entrants ==
=== Seeds ===
| Country | Player | Country | Player | Rank | Seed |
|---|---|---|---|---|---|
| GBR | Ken Skupski | GBR | Neal Skupski | 253 | 1 |
| USA | Kevin King | RSA | Dean O'Brien | 373 | 2 |
| ARG | Guillermo Durán | ARG | Renzo Olivo | 376 | 3 |
| USA | James Cerretani | CAN | Frank Dancevic | 399 | 4 |

=== Other entrants ===
The following pairs received wildcards into the doubles main draw:

- (Zimbabwe) Benjamin Lock / (Mexico) Marco Aurelio Núñez
- (United States) Stefan Kozlov / (United States) Rhyne Williams
- (United States) Terrell Whitehurst / (United States) Terrence Whitehurst

== Champions ==
=== Singles ===
- (Argentina) Facundo Argüello def. (United States) Frances Tiafoe, 2–6, 7–6^{(7–5)}, 6–4

=== Doubles ===
- (United States) Dennis Novikov / (Chile) Julio Peralta def. (India) Somdev Devvarman / Sanam Singh, 6–2, 6–4
