= Shenzhen Futian Open =

- 2025 Shenzhen Futian Open

ATP Challenger Tour
- Location: Futian District, Shenzhen, China
- Category: ATP Challenger Tour
- Surface: Hard
- Prize money: $100,000

The Shenzhen Tennis Open is a professional tennis tournament played on hardcourts. It is currently part of the ATP Challenger Tour. It was first held in Shenzhen, China in 2025.

== Past finals ==
=== Singles ===
Year	Champion	Runner-up	Score
2025	(France) Kyrian Jacquet	(China) Zhou Yi	6–3, 6–3

=== Doubles ===
Year	Champions	Runners-up	Score
2025	(United States) Nathaniel Lammons (Netherlands) Jean-Julien Rojer	(New Zealand) Finn Reynolds (New Zealand) James Watt	6–7^{(5–7)}, 7–5, [10–4]
