= 2026 Delhi Open =

- Date: 16 – 22 February
- Edition: 6th
- Category: ATP Challenger Tour
- Surface: Hard
- Location: New Delhi, India

Champions

Singles
- (Greece) Stefanos Sakellaridis

Doubles
- (India) Siddhant Banthia / (Bulgaria) Alexander Donski
- Delhi Open

The 2026 Delhi Open was a professional tennis tournament played on outdoor hard courts. It was the sixth edition of the tournament. It was part of the 2026 ATP Challenger Tour. It took place in New Delhi, India from 16 to 22 February 2026.

== Singles main draw entrants ==
=== Seeds ===
Country	Player	Rank^{1}	Seed
AUS	Dane Sweeny	138	1
JPN	Rei Sakamoto	174	2
GBR	Jay Clarke	183	3
ARG	Federico Agustín Gómez	196	4
GBR	Oliver Crawford	215	5
ITA	Federico Cinà	225	6
POL	Daniel Michalski	241	7
JPN	Rio Noguchi	246	8

- ^{1} Rankings as of 9 February 2026.

=== Other entrants ===
The following players received wildcards into the singles main draw:

- (India) Manas Dhamne
- (India) Digvijaypratap Singh
- (India) Karan Singh

The following players received entry into the singles main draw using protected rankings:

- Ilya Ivashka
- (Australia) Philip Sekulic

The following players received entry into the singles main draw as alternates:

- (Spain) David Jordà Sanchis
- (South Korea) Shin San-hui

The following players received entry from the qualifying draw:

- (Italy) Alexandr Binda
- (South Korea) Chung Hyeon
- (Poland) Maks Kaśnikowski
- (India) Manish Sureshkumar
- (Greece) Ioannis Xilas
- (Kazakhstan) Denis Yevseyev

== Champions ==
=== Singles ===
- (Greece) Stefanos Sakellaridis def. (United Kingdom) Oliver Crawford 7–5, 4–6, 7–6^{(8–6)}.

=== Doubles ===
- (India) Siddhant Banthia / (Bulgaria) Alexander Donski def. (Thailand) Pruchya Isaro / (India) Niki Kaliyanda Poonacha 4–6, 6–4, [12–10].
