= 2015 Delhi Open =

- Date: 16–22 February
- Edition: 2nd (men/women)
- Category: ATP Challenger Tour (men); ITF Women's Circuit (women)
- Prize money: $100,000 (men) $25,000 (women)
- Surface: Hard
- Location: New Delhi, India

Champions

Men's singles
- (India) Somdev Devvarman

Women's singles
- (Poland) Magda Linette

Men's doubles
- (Belarus) Egor Gerasimov / (Russia) Alexander Kudryavtsev

Women's doubles
- (China) Tang Haochen / (China) Yang Zhaoxuan
← 2014 ·	Delhi Open	· 2016 →

The 2015 Delhi Open was a professional tennis tournament played on outdoor hard courts. It is the second edition of the tournament for the men and for the women. It was part of the 2015 ATP Challenger Tour and the 2015 ITF Women's Circuit, offering a total of $100,000 in prize money in the men's event and $25,000 in the women's event. It took place in New Delhi, India, on 16–22 February 2015.

== Singles main draw entrants ==
=== Seeds ===
Country	Player	Rank^{1}	Seed
AUS	James Duckworth	113	1
RUS	Alexander Kudryavtsev	127	2
JPN	Yūichi Sugita	133	3
BEL	Ruben Bemelmans	141	4
IND	Somdev Devvarman	147	5
AUS	Luke Saville	166	6
MDA	Radu Albot	167	7
AUS	Alex Bolt	168	8

- ^{1} Rankings as of 9 February 2015

=== Other entrants ===
The following players received wildcards into the singles main draw:

- (India) Yuki Bhambri
- (India) Karunuday Singh
- (India) Sanam Singh
- (India) Vishnu Vardhan

The following players received entry from the qualifying draw:

- (India) Vijay Sundar Prashanth
- (Croatia) Dino Marcan
- (India) Sriram Balaji
- (Germany) Richard Becker

The following players received entry into the main draw as a lucky loser:

- (Australia) Andrew Whittington

== Champions ==
=== Men's singles ===
- (India) Somdev Devvarman def. (India) Yuki Bhambri, 3–6, 6–4, 6–0

=== Women's singles ===
- (Poland) Magda Linette def. (Slovenia) Tadeja Majerič, 6–1, 6–1

=== Men's doubles ===
- (Belarus) Egor Gerasimov / (Russia) Alexander Kudryavtsev def. (Italy) Riccardo Ghedin / (Japan) Toshihide Matsui, 6–7^{(5–7)}, 6–4, [10–6]

=== Women's doubles ===
- (China) Tang Haochen / (China) Yang Zhaoxuan def. (Chinese Taipei) Hsu Ching-wen / (Chinese Taipei) Lee Pei-chi, 7–5, 6–1
