= 2016 Delhi Open =

- Date: 15–21 February
- Edition: 3rd (men/women)
- Category: ATP Challenger Tour (men); ITF Women's Circuit (women)
- Prize money: $50,000 (men) $25,000 (women)
- Surface: Hard
- Location: New Delhi, India

Champions

Men's singles
- (France) Stéphane Robert

Women's singles
- (Uzbekistan) Sabina Sharipova

Men's doubles
- (India) Yuki Bhambri / (India) Mahesh Bhupathi

Women's doubles
- (Chinese Taipei) Hsu Ching-wen / (Chinese Taipei) Lee Ya-hsuan
- Delhi Open

The 2016 Delhi Open was a professional tennis tournament played on outdoor hard courts. It was the third edition of the tournament for the men and for the women. It was part of the 2016 ATP Challenger Tour and the 2016 ITF Women's Circuit, offering a total of $50,000 in prize money in the men's event and $25,000 in the women's event. It took place in New Delhi, India, on 15–21 February 2016.

== ATP singles main draw entrants ==
=== Seeds ===
| Country | Player | Rank^{1} | Seed |
|---|---|---|---|
| IND | Yuki Bhambri | 101 | 1 |
| BEL | Kimmer Coppejans | 121 | 2 |
| FRA | Stéphane Robert | 161 | 3 |
| IND | Saketh Myneni | 166 | 4 |
| BEL | Yannick Mertens | 197 | 5 |
| CHN | Zhang Ze | 206 | 6 |
| CHN | Bai Yan | 214 | 7 |
| TPE | Chen Ti | 218 | 8 |

- ^{1} Rankings as of 8 February 2016.

=== Other entrants ===
The following players received wildcards into the singles main draw:

- (India) Sriram Balaji
- (India) Prajnesh Gunneswaran
- (India) Adil Kalyanpur
- (India) Vijay Sundar Prashanth

The following players received entry from the qualifying draw:

- (India) Jeevan Nedunchezhiyan
- (Japan) Kento Takeuchi
- (India) Vishnu Vardhan
- (Italy) Francesco Vilardo

== ITF singles main draw entrants ==
=== Seeds ===
| Country | Player | Rank^{1} | Seed |
|---|---|---|---|
| TUR | İpek Soylu | 160 | 1 |
| RUS | Marina Melnikova | 212 | 2 |
| ~~CHN~~ | ~~Liu Chang~~ | ~~214~~ | ~~3~~ |
| TPE | Lee Ya-hsuan | 218 | 4 |
| SLO | Tadeja Majerič | 226 | 5 |
| UZB | Sabina Sharipova | 242 | 6 |
| FRA | Sherazad Reix | 246 | 7 |
| RUS | Valentyna Ivakhnenko | 260 | 8 |

- ^{1} Rankings as of 8 February 2016.

=== Other entrants ===
The following players received wildcards into the singles main draw:

- (India) Sai Chamarthi
- (India) Mahak Jain
- (India) Karman Thandi
- (India) Prarthana Thombare

The following players received entry from the qualifying draw:

- (Egypt) Ola Abou Zekry
- (India) Sowjanya Bavisetti
- (India) Riya Bhatia
- (Italy) Corinna Dentoni
- (Chinese Taipei) Lee Pei-chi
- (India) Natasha Palha
- (Russia) Yana Sizikova
- (India) Pranjala Yadlapalli

The following player received entry by a lucky loser spot:

- (India) Mihika Yadav

== Champions ==
=== Men's singles ===
- (France) Stéphane Robert def. (India) Saketh Myneni, 6–3, 6–0

=== Women's singles ===
- (Uzbekistan) Sabina Sharipova def. (Serbia) Nina Stojanović, 3–6, 6–2, 6–4

=== Men's doubles ===
- (India) Yuki Bhambri / (India) Mahesh Bhupathi def. (India) Saketh Myneni / (India) Sanam Singh, 6–3, 4–6, [10–5]

=== Women's doubles ===
- (Chinese Taipei) Hsu Ching-wen / (Chinese Taipei) Lee Ya-hsuan def. (Russia) Natela Dzalamidze / (Russia) Veronika Kudermetova, 6–0, 0–6, [10–6]
