= 2014 ONGC–GAIL Delhi Open =

- Date: 17 February–23 February
- Edition: 1st (men); 1st (women)
- Category: ATP Challenger Tour (men); ITF Women's Circuit (women)
- Prize money: $100,000 (men) $25,000 (women)
- Surface: Hard
- Location: New Delhi, India

Champions

Men's singles
- (India) Somdev Devvarman

Women's singles
- (China) Wang Qiang

Men's doubles
- (India) Saketh Myneni / (India) Sanam Singh

Women's doubles
- (Thailand) Nicha Lertpitaksinchai / (Thailand) Peangtarn Plipuech
ONGC–GAIL Delhi Open	· 2015 →

The 2014 ONGC–GAIL Delhi Open was a professional tennis tournament played on outdoor hard courts. It is the first edition of the tournament for the men and for the women. It was part of the 2014 ATP Challenger Tour and the 2014 ITF Women's Circuit, offering a total of $100,000 in prize money in the men's event and $25,000 in the women's event. It took place in New Delhi, India, on 17–23 February 2014.

== Singles main draw entrants ==
=== Seeds ===
Country	Player	Rank^{1}	Seed
KAZ	Aleksandr Nedovyesov	93	1
IND	Somdev Devvarman	100	2
GER	Peter Gojowczyk	104	3
RUS	Evgeny Donskoy	127	4
JPN	Go Soeda	143	5
IND	Yuki Bhambri	145	6
SLO	Blaž Rola	154	7
UKR	Illya Marchenko	158	8

- ^{1} Rankings as of 3 February 2014

=== Other entrants ===
The following players received wildcards into the singles main draw:

- (India) Saketh Myneni
- (India) Karunuday Singh
- (India) Ramkumar Ramanathan
- (India) Sanam Singh

The following players received special exempt into the singles main draw:

- (Serbia) Ilija Bozoljac

The following players received entry from the qualifying draw:

- (France) Axel Michon
- (United Kingdom) Daniel Cox
- (Portugal) Rui Machado
- (Chinese Taipei) Chen Ti

== Champions ==
=== Men's singles ===
- (India) Somdev Devvarman def. (Kazakhstan) Aleksandr Nedovyesov, 6–3, 6–1

=== Women's singles ===
- (China) Wang Qiang def. (Ukraine) Yuliya Beygelzimer, 6–1, 6–3

=== Men's doubles ===
- (India) Saketh Myneni / (India) Sanam Singh def. (Thailand) Sanchai Ratiwatana / (Thailand) Sonchat Ratiwatana, 7–6^{(7–5)}, 6–4

=== Women's doubles ===
- (Thailand) Nicha Lertpitaksinchai / (Thailand) Peangtarn Plipuech def. (Japan) Erika Sema / (Japan) Yurika Sema, 7–6^{(7–5)}, 6–3
