= Kyrian Jacquet =

French tennis player (born 2001)

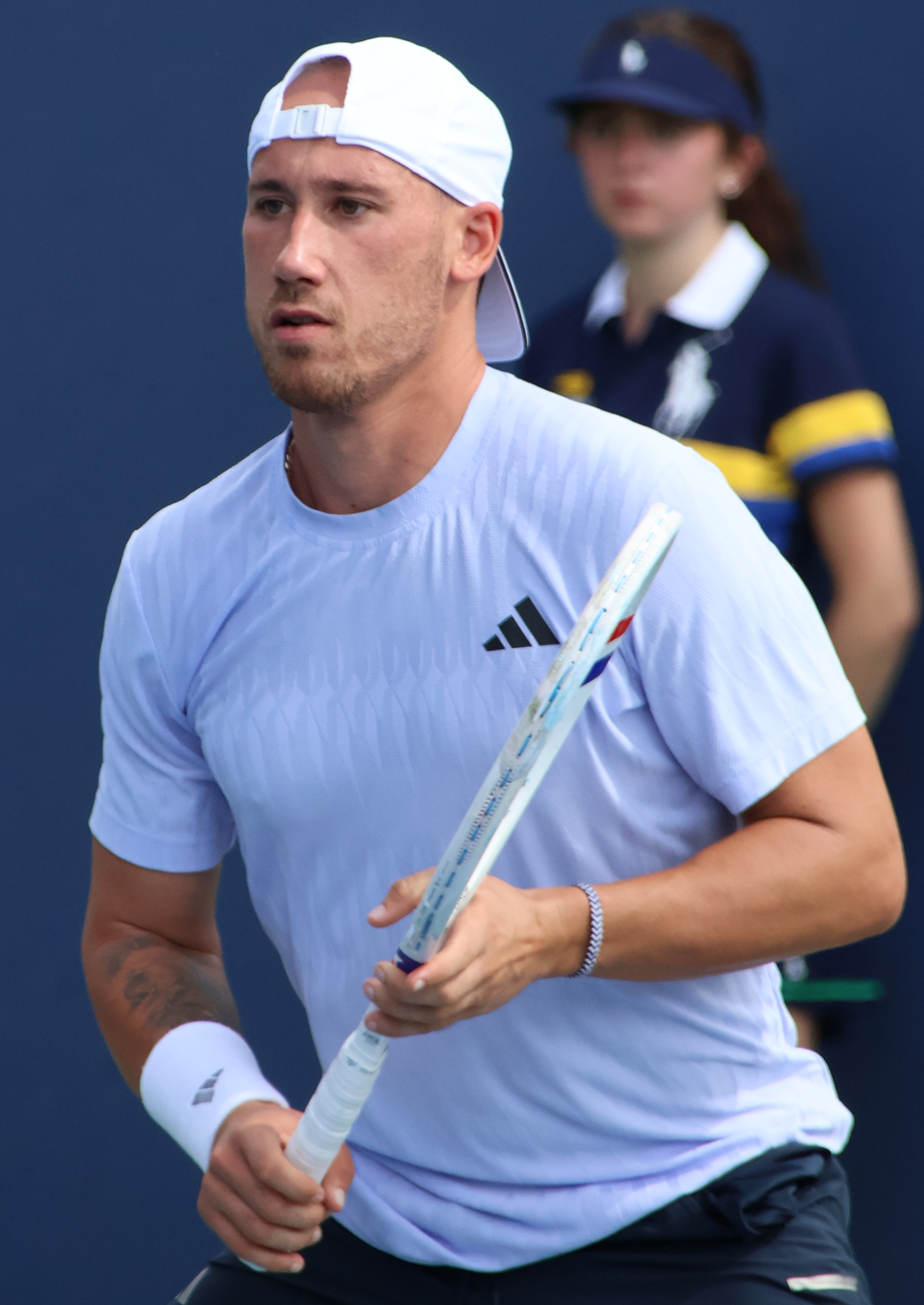
- Jacquet at the 2026 US Open
- Country (sports): France
- Residence: Vernaison
- Born: 11 May 2001 (age 25) Lyon, France
- Height: 1.75 m (5 ft 9 in)
- Plays: Right-handed (two handed-backhand)
- Coach: Stéphane Robert
- Prize money: US $1,425,907

Singles
- Career record: 9–12 (at ATP Tour level, Grand Slam level, and in Davis Cup)
- Career titles: 0
- Highest ranking: No. 76 (5 October 2026)
- Current ranking: No. 86 (16 November 2026)

Grand Slam singles results
- Australian Open: 1R (2026)
- French Open: 1R (2025, 2026)
- Wimbledon: 2R (2026)
- US Open: 1R (2024)

Doubles
- Career record: 4–4 (at ATP Tour level, Grand Slam level, and in Davis Cup)
- Career titles: 1
- Highest ranking: No. 213 (14 September 2026)
- Current ranking: No. 240 (5 October 2026)

Grand Slam doubles results
- French Open: 1R (2020, 2025, 2026)
- Last updated on: 16 November 2026.

Kyrian Jacquet (born 11 May 2001) is a French professional tennis player. He has a career-high ATP singles ranking of world No. 76 achieved on 5 October 2026 and a doubles ranking of No. 213 achieved on 14 September 2026.

== Professional career ==
=== 2020: Grand Slam doubles debut ===
At the 2020 Rennes Challenger, Jacquet was awarded a wildcard. He reached the quarterfinals where he lost in three sets to Britain’s James Ward.

Jacquet made his doubles ATP Tour main draw debut when he was awarded a wildcard entry into the draw at the 2020 French Open alongside compatriot Corentin Denolly. They faced the first seeded and eventual semifinalists, Colombian pair Robert Farah and Juan-Sebastian Cabal and won the first set 6–3; they ultimately lost the match in three sets.

=== 2021: First Futures win ===
In June 2021, Jacquet won his first tournament on the ITF Futures Circuit in Helsinki, Finland. In 2021, Jacquet also reached two semifinals on the Challenger circuit in Aix-en-Provence, France and Tampere, Finland.

=== 2023: Top 250, First Challenger title ===
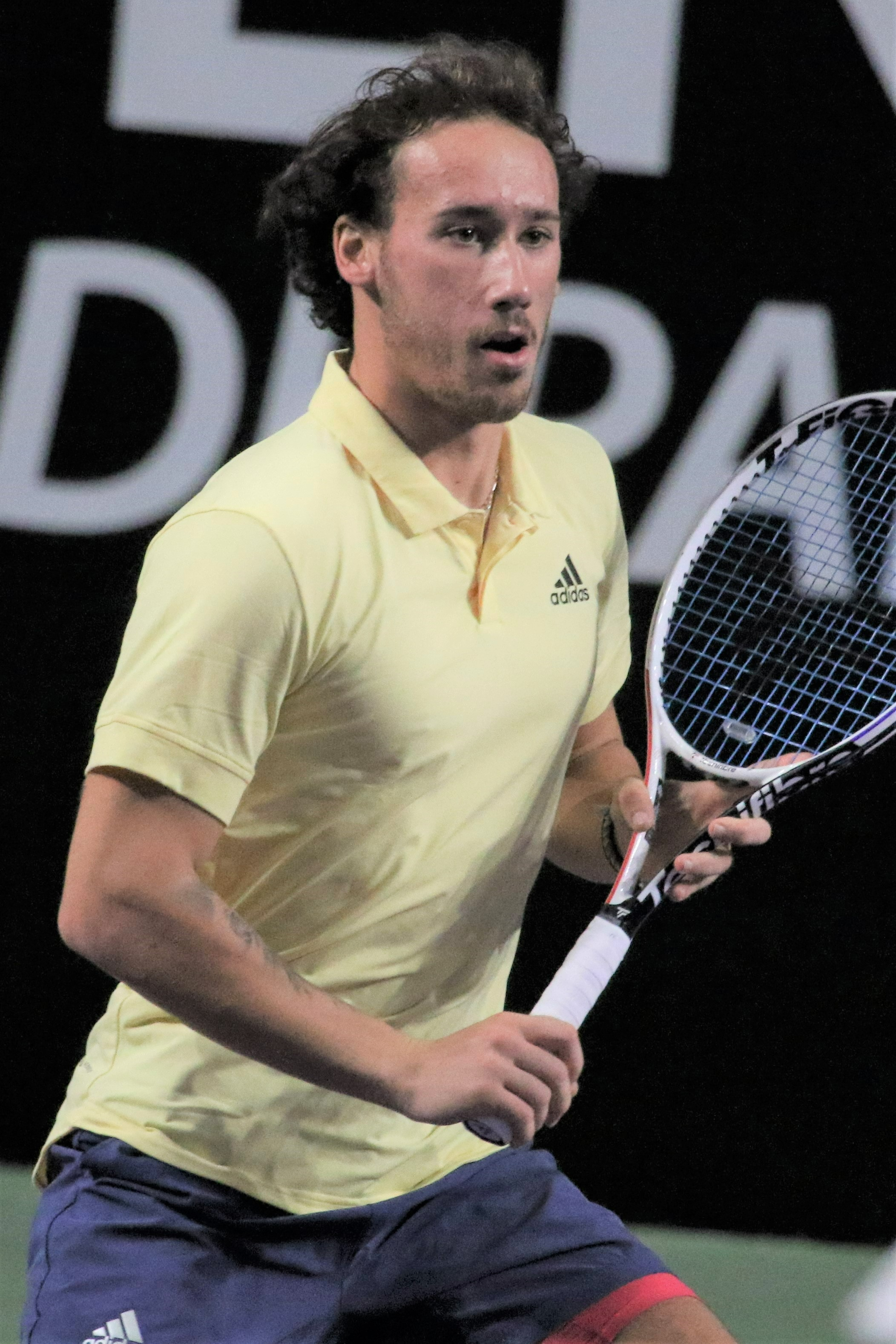
Jacquet at the 2022 Internationaux de Tennis de Vendée

In June, 2023, Jacquet reached his first Challenger singles finals at the Internationaux de Blois, France, losing to top seed Quentin Halys.

In October, Jacquet won his first title on the ATP Challenger Tour as a qualifier at the Olbia Challenger, defeating seventh seed Flavio Cobolli in the final. As a result of his win, he broke into the top 205 in the rankings.

=== 2024: Major and top 200 debuts ===
In January, Jacquet made his qualifying debut at the Australian Open, reaching the second round of the qualifying competition. As a result he reached the top 200 on 29 January 2024 at world No. 193. In July, Jacquet reached his third Challenger final in Salzburg, losing to Alexander Ritschard in the final.

In August, ranked No. 208, Jacquet made his Grand Slam main draw debut at the US Open after qualifying into the main draw, losing to ninth seed Grigor Dimitrov in the first round.

=== 2025: First ATP wins and quarterfinal, top 150 ===
In February, Jacquet won back-to-back Challenger titles, winning his second career title in Chennai, defeating Elias Ymer in the final and the following week, winning his third Challenger title in New Delhi, defeating Billy Harris in the final. As a result he reached No. 152 in the singles rankings on 24 February 2025.

In May, Jacquet made his French Open debut by reaching the main draw as a qualifier. He lost to Nuno Borges in the first round in five sets.

In October, Jacquet won his third Challenger title of the season at the Shenzhen Open, defeating Zhou Yi in the final. In November, Jacquet recorded his first ATP Tour win at the Moselle Open in Metz, France, as a lucky loser, defeating Luca Van Assche in the first round. He defeated Dan Added in the second round to reach his first ATP Tour quarterfinal.

=== 2026: Major win, ATP singles semifinal and doubles title, top 100 ===
Jacquet received a wildcard for the 2026 Australian Open for his debut at the event. He lost to Emilio Nava in the first round in a fifth-set tie-break. In May, he qualified for the 2026 French Open with victory against Felix Gill of Great Britain in the final qualifying round, before losing in the first round of the main draw to Marco Trungelliti.

In June, Jacquet recorded his first Grand Slam win at Wimbledon where he entered the main draw as a qualifier and defeated Vilius Gaubas in the first round.

In July, Jacquet won his first ATP Tour doubles title at the Estoril Open, pairing with compatriot Titouan Droguet where the pair defeated second seeds Orlando Luz and Rafael Matos in the final.

In September, Jacquet reached his first ATP Tour singles semifinal at the Hangzhou Open after recording his first top 30 win against third seed Tomás Martín Etcheverry in the second round, and sixth seed Fabian Marozsan in the quarterfinal. He lost to second seed Andrey Rublev in the semifinal but still entered the top 100 at world No. 86 on 28 September 2026. The following week, Jacquet reached his first ATP 500 quarterfinal at the Tokyo Open. He defeated Luciano Darderi to reach the quarterfinal, his first top 20 win. He lost to Jaume Munar in the quarterfinal. As a result, he entered the top 80 on 5 October 2026.

== Performance timeline ==
Key
W	F	SF	QF	#R	RR	Q#	DNQ	A	NH

(W) winner; (F) finalist; (SF) semifinalist; (QF) quarterfinalist; (#R) rounds 4, 3, 2, 1; (RR) round-robin stage; (Q#) qualification round; (DNQ) did not qualify; (A) absent; (NH) not held; (SR) strike rate (events won / competed); (W–L) win–loss record.
To avoid confusion and double counting, these charts are updated at the conclusion of a tournament or when the player's participation has ended.

=== Singles ===
Tournament	2020	2021	2022	2023	2024	2025	2026	SR	W–L	Win %
Grand Slam tournaments
Australian Open	A	A	A	A	Q2	A	1R	0 / 1	0–1	0%
French Open	Q2	Q1	A	A	Q1	1R	1R	0 / 2	0–2	0%
Wimbledon	NH	A	A	A	Q1	Q3	2R	0 / 1	1–1	50%
US Open	A	A	A	A	1R	Q2	Q2	0 / 1	0–1	0%
Win–loss	0–0	0–0	0–0	0–0	0–1	0–1	1–3	0 / 5	1–5	17%
ATP Masters 1000
Indian Wells Masters	NH	A	A	A	A	A	A	0 / 0	0–0	–
Miami Open	NH	A	A	A	A	A	A	0 / 0	0–0	–
Monte Carlo Masters	NH	A	A	A	A	A	A	0 / 0	0–0	–
Madrid Open	NH	A	A	A	A	A	A	0 / 0	0-0	–
Italian Open	A	A	A	A	A	A	A	0 / 0	0–0	–
Canadian Open	NH	A	A	A	A	Q1	1R	0 / 1	0–1	0%
Cincinnati Masters	A	A	A	A	A	A	1R	0 / 1	0–1	0%
Shanghai Masters	NH			A	A	Q1	Q2	0 / 0	0–0	–
Paris Masters	A	A	A	A	A	Q1	1R	0 / 1	0–1	0%
Win–loss	0–0	0–0	0–0	0–0	0–0	0–0	0–3	0 / 3	0–3	0%
Year-End Ranking							86			

== ATP career finals ==
=== Doubles: 1 (1 title) ===
Legend Grand Slams (0–0) ATP Finals (0–0) ATP Masters 1000 (0–0) ATP 500 (0–0) ATP 250 (1–0)	Titles by surface Hard (0–0) Clay (1–0) Grass (0–0)

Result	W–L	Date	Tournament	Tier	Surface	Partner	Opponents	Score
Win	1–0	Jul 2026	Estoril Open, Portugal	ATP 250	Clay	(France) Titouan Droguet	(Brazil) Orlando Luz (Brazil) Rafael Matos	7–6^{(7–2)}, 6–7^{(4–7)}, [11–9]

== ATP Challenger and ITF Tour finals ==
=== Singles: 12 (6 titles, 6 runner-ups) ===
Legend ATP Challenger (5–2) ITF Futures (1–4)	Finals by surface Hard (5–2) Clay (1–4) Grass (0–0) Carpet (0–0)

Result	W–L	Date	Tournament	Tier	Surface	Opponent	Score
Loss	0–1	Jul 2019	M25 Bourg-en-Bresse, France	World Tennis Tour	Clay	(France) Maxime Hamou	4–6, 7–6^{(7–4)}, 3–6
Loss	0–2	Oct 2019	M15 Sharm El Sheikh, Egypt	World Tennis Tour	Hard	(Spain) Pablo Vivero Gonzalez	1–6, 5–7
Loss	0–3	May 2021	M15 Las Palmas, Spain	World Tennis Tour	Clay	(Spain) Alvaro Lopez San Martin	6–7^{(6–8)}, 7–6^{(7–4)}, 5–7
Win	1–3	June 2021	M15 Helsinki, Finland	World Tennis Tour	Clay	(France) Lilian Marmousez	6–1, 6-2
Loss	1–4	Nov 2022	M25 Monastir, Tunisia	World Tennis Tour	Hard	(France) Ugo Blanchet	6–4, 3–6, 2–6
Loss	1–5	Jun 2023	Blois, France	Challenger	Clay	(France) Quentin Halys	6–4, 2–6, 0–2 ret.
Win	2–5	Oct 2023	Olbia, Italy	Challenger	Hard	(Italy) Flavio Cobolli	6–3, 6–4
Loss	2–6	Jul 2024	Salzburg, Austria	Challenger	Clay	(Switzerland) Alexander Ritschard	4–6, 2–6
Win	3–6	Feb 2025	Chennai, India	Challenger	Hard	(Sweden) Elias Ymer	7–6^{(7–1)}, 6–4
Win	4–6	Feb 2025	New Delhi, India	Challenger	Hard	(United Kingdom) Billy Harris	6–4, 6–2
Win	5–6	Oct 2025	Shenzhen, China	Challenger	Hard	(China) Zhou Yi	6–3, 6–3
Win	6–6	Jan 2026	Manama, Bahrain	Challenger	Hard	(Italy) Luca Nardi	7–5, 3–6, 6–4.
