= Emami Kolkata Open ATP Challenger Tour =

- 2015 Emami Kolkata Open ATP Challenger Tour

Defunct tennis tournament
- Event name: Emami Kolkata Open ATP Challenger Tour
- Location: Kolkata, India
- Venue: Bengal Tennis Association Stadium
- Category: ATP Challenger Tour
- Surface: Hard (indoor)
- Draw: 32S/28Q/16D/4Q
- Prize money: $50,000

The Emami Kolkata Open ATP Challenger Tour (formerly known as State Bank of India ATP Challenger Tour) was a professional tennis tournament played on outdoor hardcourts. It was part of the ATP Challenger Tour. It was held annually at the Bengal Tennis Association Stadium in Kolkata, India in 2014 and in 2015.

== Past finals ==
=== Singles ===
Year	Champion	Runner-up	Score	Ref.
2015	(Moldova) Radu Albot	(Australia) James Duckworth	7–6^{(7–0)}, 6–1	
2014	(Serbia) Ilija Bozoljac	(Russia) Evgeny Donskoy	6–1, 6–1	

=== Doubles ===
Year	Champion	Runner-up	Score	Ref.
2015	(India) Somdev Devvarman (India) Jeevan Nedunchezhiyan	(Australia) James Duckworth (Australia) Luke Saville	Walkover	
2014	(India) Saketh Myneni (India) Sanam Singh	(India) Divij Sharan (India) Vishnu Vardhan	6–3, 3–6, [10–4]	
