= Sanam Singh =

Indian tennis player

Sanam Krishan Singh
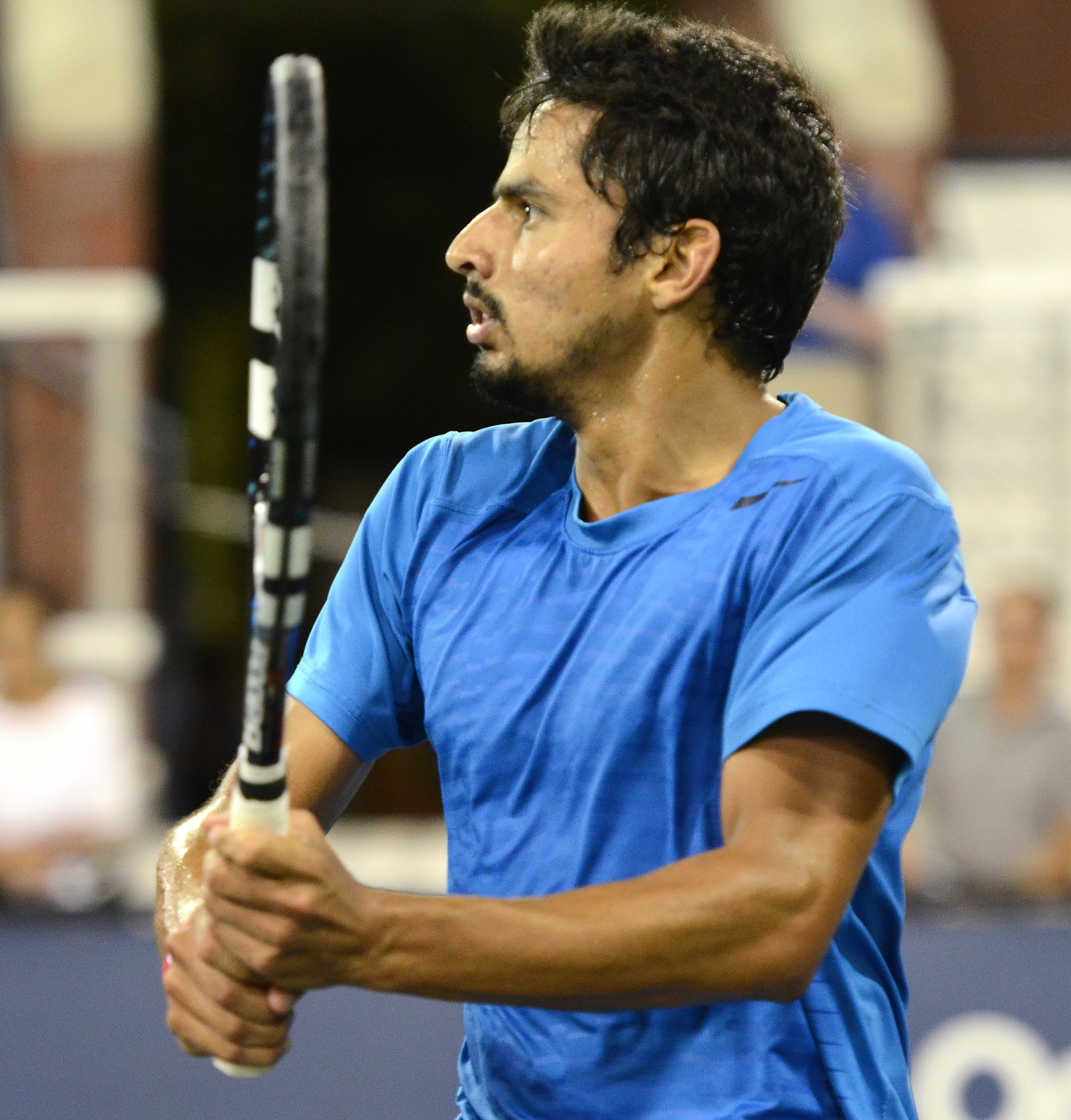
- Country (sports): India
- Residence: Chandigarh, India
- Born: 11 January 1988 (age 38) Chandigarh, India
- Height: 1.75 m (5 ft 9 in)
- Turned pro: 2004
- Plays: Right-handed (two-handed backhand)
- Prize money: US$135,103

Singles
- Career record: 1-3
- Career titles: 0
- Highest ranking: No. 266 (19 October 2015)

Grand Slam singles results
- Wimbledon: Q2 (2014)
- US Open: Q2 (2014)

Doubles
- Career record: 4-6
- Career titles: 0
- Highest ranking: No. 138 (9 February 2015)
Medal record
Asian Games
Gold medal – first place	2010 Guangzhou	Doubles
Bronze medal – third place	2010 Guangzhou	Team
Silver medal – second place	2014 Incheon	Doubles
South Asian Games
Silver medal – second place	2016 Guwahati	Doubles
Silver medal – second place	2016 Guwahati	Mixed Doubles

Sanam Krishan Singh (born 11 January 1988) is a former Indian tennis player. Singh won the doubles gold medal and the bronze in the team event at the 2010 Asian Games. He added another Asian Games medal to his tally by winning the silver medal in Doubles in the 2014 Asian Games held at Incheon. Singh played college tennis at the University of Virginia between 2007 and 2011. Singh is currently an assistant Tennis coach at Harvard University.

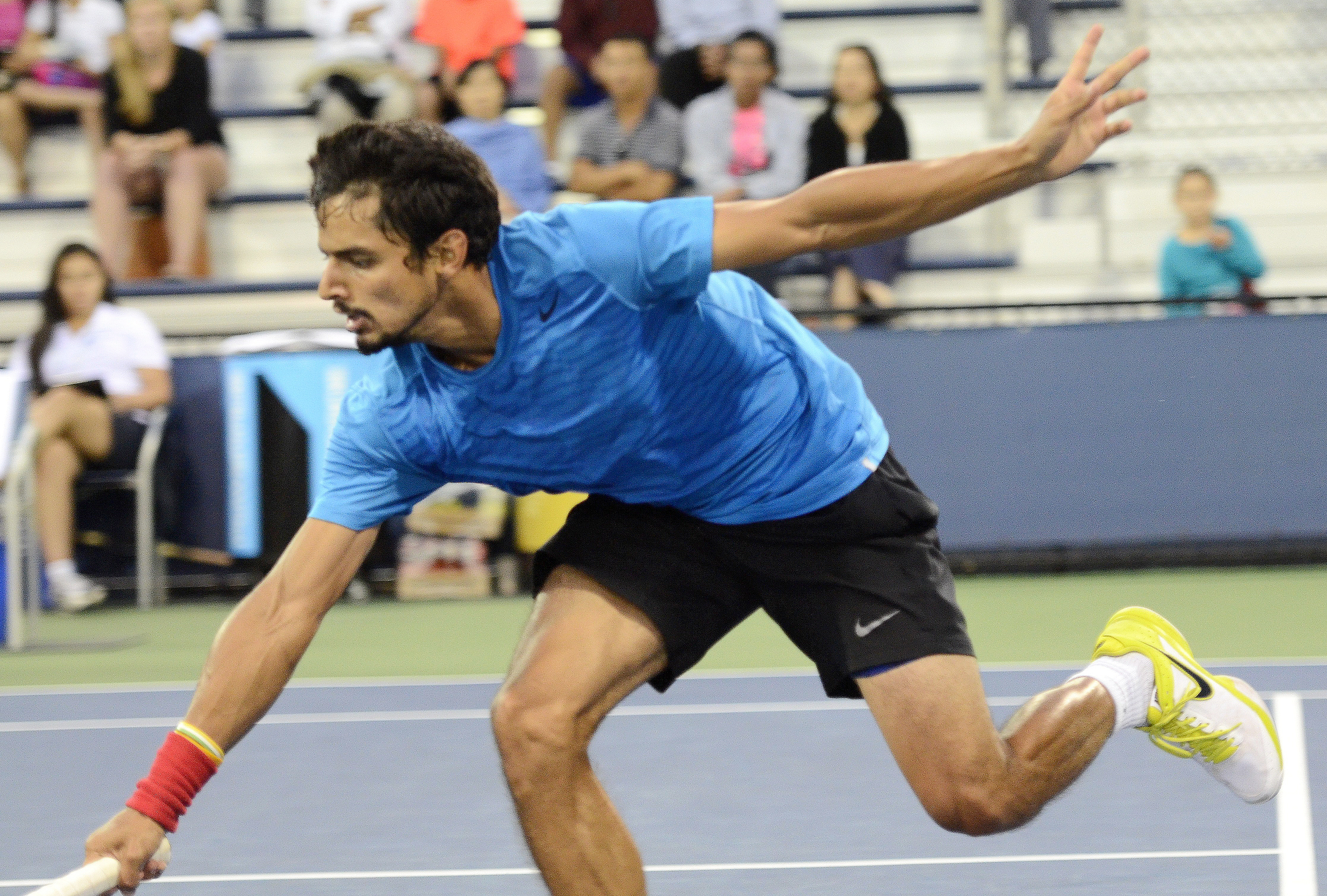
2014 US Open

== Early career ==
Singh ranked fourth in the ITF junior rankings in 2005. Played all four junior grand slams. He reached at the round of 16 at the Junior Australian Open, Junior Wimbledon, 2005 Asian Closed Junior Championship and Asia/Oceania Closed Championship singles champion. In 2007, he reached the quarter-finals of a Futures Circuit event in India.

== ATP Challenger Tour finals ==
=== Doubles: 9 (4–5) ===
Legend Grand Slam (0–0) Olympic Games (0–0) ATP Tour Masters 1000 (0–0) ATP Tour 500 series (0–0) ATP Tour 250 series (0–0) ATP Challenger Tour (4–5)	Titles by surface Hard (4–5) Clay (0–0) Grass (0–0) Carpet (0–0)

Result	W–L	Date	Tournament	Tier	Surface	Partner	Opponents	Score
Win	1–0	Feb 2014	Kolkata, India	Challenger	Hard	(India) Saketh Myneni	(India) Divij Sharan (India) Vishnu Vardhan	6–3, 3–6, [10–4]
Win	2–0	Feb 2014	New Delhi, India	Challenger	Hard	(India) Saketh Myneni	(Thailand) Sanchai Ratiwatana (Thailand) Sonchat Ratiwatana	7–6^{(7–5)}, 6–4
Loss	2–1	Aug 2014	Aptos, United States	Challenger	Hard	(India) Purav Raja	(Belgium) Ruben Bemelmans (Lithuania) Laurynas Grigelis	3–6, 6–4, [9–11]
Loss	2–2	Sep 2014	Shanghai, China	Challenger	Hard	(India) Somdev Devvarman	(India) Yuki Bhambri (India) Divij Sharan	5–7^{(2–7)},7–6^{(7–4)}, [8–10]
Win	3–2	Oct 2014	Pune, India	Challenger	Hard	(India) Saketh Myneni	(Thailand) Sanchai Ratiwatana (Thailand) Sonchat Ratiwatana	6–3, 6–2
Loss	3–3	Apr 2015	Tallahassee, United States	Challenger	Hard	(India) Somdev Devvarman	(United States) Dennis Novikov (Chile) Julio Peralta	2–6, 4–6
Win	4–3	Oct 2015	Bangalore, India	Challenger	Hard	(India) Saketh Myneni	(United States) John Paul Fruttero (India) Vijay Sundar Prashanth	5–7, 6–4, [10–2]
Loss	4–4	Feb 2016	New Delhi, India	Challenger	Hard	(India) Saketh Myneni	(India) Yuki Bhambri (India) Mahesh Bhupathi	3–6, 6–4, [5–10]
Loss	4–5	Aug 2016	Granby, Canada	Challenger	Hard	(India) Saketh Myneni	(Brazil) Guilherme Clezar (Colombia) Alejandro González	6–3, 1–6, [10–12]

== Other finals ==
=== Asian Games ===
Finals: 2 (1–1)

==== Doubles Finals: 2 (1–1) ====
Result	W–L	Date	Tournament	Tier	Surface	Partner	Opponents	Score
Gold	1–0	22 November 2010	2010 Asian Games	Asian Games	Hard	(India) Somdev Devvarman	(China) Gong Maoxin (China) Li Zhe	6–3, 6–7^{(4–7)},[10–8]
Silver	1–1	29 September 2014	2014 Asian Games	Asian Games	Hard	(India) Saketh Myneni	(South Korea) Hyeon Chung (South Korea) Lim Yong-kyu	5–7, 6–7^{(2–7)}
