= Delhi Open =

Tournament information
- Event name: Delhi Open (2015–present); ONGC-GAIL Delhi Open (2014)
- Location: New Delhi, India
- Venue: R.K. Khanna Tennis Complex
- Surface: Hard / Indoor
ATP Tour
- Category: ATP Challenger Tour
- Draw: 32S / 32Q / 16D / 4Q
- Prize money: $50,000
WTA Tour
- Category: ITF Women's Circuit
- Draw: 32S / 48Q / 16D
- Prize money: $25,000

The Delhi Open (formerly known as ONGC–GAIL Delhi Open) is a professional tennis tournament played on outdoor hardcourts. It is currently part of the ATP Challenger Tour and the ITF Women's Circuit. Since 2014, it has been held annually at the R.K. Khanna Tennis Complex in New Delhi, India.

== Past finals ==
=== Men's singles ===
Year	Champion	Runner-up	Score
2026	(Greece) Stefanos Sakellaridis	(United Kingdom) Oliver Crawford	7–5, 4–6, 7–6^{(8–6)}
2025	(France) Kyrian Jacquet	(United Kingdom) Billy Harris	6–4, 6–2
2024	(France) Geoffrey Blancaneaux	(Hong Kong) Coleman Wong	6–4, 6–2
2017–23	Not held		
2016	(France) Stéphane Robert	(India) Saketh Myneni	6–3, 6–0
2015	(India) Somdev Devvarman	(India) Yuki Bhambri	3–6, 6–4, 6–0
2014	(India) Somdev Devvarman	(Kazakhstan) Aleksandr Nedovyesov	6–3, 6–1

=== Men's doubles ===
Year	Champions	Runner-up	Score
2026	(India) Siddhant Banthia (Bulgaria) Alexander Donski	(Thailand) Pruchya Isaro (India) Niki Kaliyanda Poonacha	4–6, 6–4, [12–10]
2025	(Japan) Masamichi Imamura (Japan) Rio Noguchi	(India) Niki Kaliyanda Poonacha (Zimbabwe) Courtney John Lock	6–4, 6–3
2024	(Poland) Piotr Matuszewski (Australia) Matthew Romios	(Germany) Jakob Schnaitter (Germany) Mark Wallner	6–4, 6–4
2017–23	Not held		
2016	(India) Yuki Bhambri (India) Mahesh Bhupathi	(India) Saketh Myneni (India) Sanam Singh	6–3, 4–6, [10–5]
2015	(Belarus) Egor Gerasimov (Russia) Alexander Kudryavtsev	(Italy) Riccardo Ghedin (Japan) Toshihide Matsui	6–7^{(5–7)}, 6–4, [10–6]
2014	(India) Saketh Myneni (India) Sanam Singh	(Thailand) Sanchai Ratiwatana (Thailand) Sonchat Ratiwatana	7–6^{(7–5)}, 6–4

=== Women's singles ===
Year	Champion	Runner-up	Score
2016	(Uzbekistan) Sabina Sharipova	(Serbia) Nina Stojanović	3–6, 6–2, 6–4
2015	(Poland) Magda Linette	(Slovenia) Tadeja Majerič	6–1, 6–1
2014	(China) Wang Qiang	(Ukraine) Yuliya Beygelzimer	6–1, 6–3

=== Women's doubles ===
Year	Champion	Runner-up	Score
2016	(Chinese Taipei) Hsu Ching-wen (Chinese Taipei) Lee Ya-hsuan	(Russia) Natela Dzalamidze (Russia) Veronika Kudermetova	6–0, 0–6, [10–6]
2015	(China) Tang Haochen (China) Yang Zhaoxuan	(Chinese Taipei) Hsu Ching-wen (Chinese Taipei) Lee Pei-chi	7–5, 6–1
2014	(Thailand) Nicha Lertpitaksinchai (Thailand) Peangtarn Plipuech	(Japan) Erika Sema (Japan) Yurika Sema	7–6^{(7–5)}, 6–3
