= 2025 Chennai Open Challenger – Singles =

Singles
- 2025 Chennai Open Challenger

Final
- Champion: (France) Kyrian Jacquet
- Runner-up: (Sweden) Elias Ymer
- Score: 7–6^{(7–1)}, 6–4

Events
Singles	Doubles
← 2024 ·	Chennai Open Challenger	· 2026 →

Sumit Nagal was the defending champion but chose not to defend his title.

Kyrian Jacquet won the title after defeating Elias Ymer 7–6^{(7–1)}, 6–4 in the final.

== Seeds ==
1. (United Kingdom) Billy Harris (semifinals)
2. (South Africa) Lloyd Harris (second round)
3. (Croatia) Duje Ajduković (first round)
4. (Canada) Alexis Galarneau (second round)
5. (Japan) Shintaro Mochizuki (quarterfinals)
6. (Japan) Sho Shimabukuro (first round)
7. (Kazakhstan) Timofey Skatov (quarterfinals)
8. (Hungary) Zsombor Piros (first round)

== Draw ==
=== Key ===
- Q = Qualifier
- WC = Wild card
- LL = Lucky loser
- Alt = Alternate
- ITF = ITF entry
- PR = Protected ranking
- SR = Special ranking
- SE = Special exempt
- JE = Junior exempt
- JR = Junior Accelerator Programme entrant
- CO = College Accelerator Programme entrant
- NG = Next Gen Accelerator Program entrant
- w/o = Walkover
- r = Retired
- d = Defaulted

=== Finals ===
Semifinals
1	(United Kingdom) Billy Harris	6^{5}	6^{2}
(Sweden) Elias Ymer	7^{7}	7^{7}
(France) Kyrian Jacquet	6	6
(Czech Republic) Dalibor Svrčina	4	1

Final
(Sweden) Elias Ymer	6^{1}	4
(France) Kyrian Jacquet	7^{7}	6

=== Top half ===
First round
1	(United Kingdom) B Harris	7	6
Q	(Ukraine) Eric Vanshelboim	5	2
(Turkey) E Kırkın	6^{7}	7^{7}	0
(Czech Republic) J Veselý	7^{9}	6^{3}	0^{r}
A Karatsev	7^{7}	6
(France) C Denolly	6^{4}	4
Q	(Czech Republic) H Bartoň	4	4
7	(Kazakhstan) T Skatov	6	6
3	(Croatia) D Ajduković	2	7^{7}	2
(Sweden) E Ymer	6	6^{4}	6
(United Kingdom) J Clarke	6	7
WC	(India) R Ramanathan	3	5
Q	(Belgium) K Coppejans	5	1^{r}
(Japan) R Noguchi	7	3
(Italy) J Berrettini	6	7^{7}
6	(Japan) S Shimabukuro	3	6^{4}

Second round
1	(United Kingdom) B Harris	6	6
(Turkey) E Kırkın	3	3
A Karatsev	4	5
7	(Kazakhstan) T Skatov	6	7
(Sweden) E Ymer	7	7^{7}
(United Kingdom) J Clarke	5	6^{2}
(Japan) R Noguchi	7	6
(Italy) J Berrettini	5	3

Quarterfinals
1	(United Kingdom) B Harris	6	7^{8}
7	(Kazakhstan) T Skatov	3	6^{6}
(Sweden) E Ymer	6	6
(Japan) R Noguchi	2	3

Semifinals
1	(United Kingdom) B Harris	6^{5}	6^{2}
(Sweden) E Ymer	7^{7}	7^{7}

=== Bottom half ===
First round
5	(Japan) S Mochizuki	6	6
(Italy) E Dalla Valle	2	1
(Belgium) M Geerts	6	7^{7}
Q	Maxim Zhukov	2	6^{5}
(France) K Jacquet	6	6
WC	(India) K Singh	3	3
Q	E Agafonov	4	1
4	(Canada) A Galarneau	6	6
8	(Hungary) Z Piros	6^{4}	4
(Ukraine) O Ovcharenko	7^{7}	6
A Zakharov	6	6^{3}	6
WC	(India) M Sasikumar	3	7^{7}	1
LL	(France) S Gueymard Wayenburg	7	6^{2}	0
(Czech Republic) D Svrčina	5	7^{7}	6
Q	(Ukraine) Yurii Dzhavakian	3	7	0
2	(South Africa) L Harris	6	5	6

Second round
5	(Japan) S Mochizuki	6	6
(Belgium) M Geerts	4	4
(France) K Jacquet	6	6
4	(Canada) A Galarneau	2	2
(Ukraine) O Ovcharenko	0	7^{7}	6
A Zakharov	6	6^{5}	4
(Czech Republic) D Svrčina	6	6
2	(South Africa) L Harris	1	1

Quarterfinals
5	(Japan) S Mochizuki	1	6	6^{6}
(France) K Jacquet	6	4	7^{8}
(Ukraine) O Ovcharenko	3	0
(Czech Republic) D Svrčina	6	6

Semifinals
(France) K Jacquet	6	6
(Czech Republic) D Svrčina	4	1
