= 2019 Chennai Open Challenger – Doubles =

Doubles
- 2019 Chennai Open Challenger

Final
- Champions: (Italy) Gianluca Mager (Italy) Andrea Pellegrino
- Runners-up: (Australia) Matt Reid (Australia) Luke Saville
- Score: 6–4, 7–6^{(9–7)}

Events
Singles	Doubles
← 2018 ·	Chennai Open Challenger	· 2023 →

Sriram Balaji and Vishnu Vardhan were the defending champions but chose not to defend their title.

Gianluca Mager and Andrea Pellegrino won the title after defeating Matt Reid and Luke Saville 6–4, 7–6^{(9–7)} in the final.

== Seeds ==
1. (Australia) Matt Reid / (Australia) Luke Saville (final)
2. (Croatia) Tomislav Draganja / (Chinese Taipei) Yang Tsung-hua (semifinals)
3. (India) Arjun Kadhe / (India) Saketh Myneni (first round)
4. (Sweden) André Göransson / (Finland) Harri Heliövaara (semifinals)

== Draw ==
=== Key ===
- Q = Qualifier
- WC = Wild card
- LL = Lucky loser
- Alt = Alternate
- SE = Special exempt
- PR = Protected ranking
- ITF = ITF entry
- JE = Junior exempt
- w/o = Walkover
- r = Retired
- d = Defaulted
- SR = Special ranking

First round
1	(Australia) M Reid (Australia) L Saville	7^{7}	6
(Australia) B Ellis (Australia) B Mousley	6^{4}	4
WC	(India) Sidharth Rawat (India) Manish Sureshkumar	6^{5}	6	[10]
WC	(India) A Chandrasekar (India) Abhinav Sanjeev Shanmugam	7^{7}	2	[5]
4	(Sweden) A Göransson (Finland) H Heliövaara	w/o
(Spain) A Davidovich Fokina (France) C Moutet
(Lithuania) L Grigelis (Egypt) M Safwat	7^{10}	6^{7}	[8]
(Russia) I Gakhov (Russia) A Pavlioutchenkov	6^{8}	7^{9}	[10]
(India) VS Prashanth (New Zealand) R Statham	6	6
(United Kingdom) B Klein (Japan) T Matsui	4	4
(Italy) G Mager (Italy) A Pellegrino	7^{7}	6
3	(India) A Kadhe (India) S Myneni	6^{4}	3
WC	(Vietnam) NH Lý (India) S Nagal	6	6
ITF	(Russia) I Nedelko (Russia) A Zhurbin	1	2
ITF	(United States) JP Fruttero (Spain) D Pérez Sanz	4	6	[11]
2	(Croatia) T Draganja (Chinese Taipei) T-h Yang	6	2	[13]

Quarterfinals
1	(Australia) M Reid (Australia) L Saville	6	6
WC	(India) S Rawat (India) M Sureshkumar	2	2
4	(Sweden) A Göransson (Finland) H Heliövaara	6	6
(Russia) I Gakhov (Russia) A Pavlioutchenkov	3	4
(India) VS Prashanth (New Zealand) R Statham	3	1
(Italy) G Mager (Italy) A Pellegrino	6	6
WC	(Vietnam) NH Lý (India) S Nagal
2	(Croatia) T Draganja (Chinese Taipei) T-h Yang	w/o

Semifinals
1	(Australia) M Reid (Australia) L Saville	6	6
4	(Sweden) A Göransson (Finland) H Heliövaara	4	3
(Italy) G Mager (Italy) A Pellegrino	6	6
2	(Croatia) T Draganja (Chinese Taipei) T-h Yang	0	4

Final
1	(Australia) M Reid (Australia) L Saville	4	6^{7}
(Italy) G Mager (Italy) A Pellegrino	6	7^{9}
