= 2023 Chennai Open Challenger – Singles =

Singles
- 2023 Chennai Open Challenger

Final
- Champion: (Australia) Max Purcell
- Runner-up: (United States) Nicolas Moreno de Alboran
- Score: 5–7, 7–6^{(7–2)}, 6–4

Events
Singles	Doubles
← 2019 ·	Chennai Open Challenger	· 2024 →

Corentin Moutet was the defending champion but chose not to defend his title.

Max Purcell won the title after defeating Nicolas Moreno de Alboran 5–7, 7–6^{(7–2)}, 6–4 in the final.

== Seeds ==
1. (Chinese Taipei) Tseng Chun-hsin (second round)
2. (Australia) James Duckworth (quarterfinals)
3. (Austria) Sebastian Ofner (first round)
4. (United Kingdom) Ryan Peniston (first round)
5. (Italy) Luca Nardi (first round)
6. (Italy) Francesco Maestrelli (first round)
7. (Czech Republic) Dalibor Svrčina (second round)
8. (Bulgaria) Dimitar Kuzmanov (second round)

== Draw ==
=== Key ===
- Q = Qualifier
- WC = Wild card
- LL = Lucky loser
- Alt = Alternate
- SE = Special exempt
- PR = Protected ranking
- ITF = ITF entry
- JE = Junior exempt
- w/o = Walkover
- r = Retired
- d = Defaulted
- SR = Special ranking

=== Finals ===
Semifinals
(United States) Nicolas Moreno de Alboran	6	6
Q	(India) Sumit Nagal	4	2
(Australia) Dane Sweeny	4	6^{3}
(Australia) Max Purcell	6	7^{7}

Final
(United States) Nicolas Moreno de Alboran	7	6^{2}	4
(Australia) Max Purcell	5	7^{7}	6

=== Top half ===
First round
1	(Chinese Taipei) C-h Tseng	6	7^{8}
(Croatia) N Serdarušić	4	6^{6}
(United States) N Moreno de Alboran	6	6
(Portugal) F Ferreira Silva	3	2
PR	(Australia) M Polmans	4	6^{5}
(Japan) Y Uchiyama	6	7^{7}
Q	A Kachmazov	2	3
7	(Czech Republic) D Svrčina	6	6
4	(United Kingdom) R Peniston	4	4
Q	(India) S Nagal	6	6
LL	(Chinese Taipei) J Jung	6	1	7^{7}
(France) H Mayot	3	6	6^{5}
(United Kingdom) J Clarke	4	6	7^{7}
WC	(India) P Gunneswaran	6	3	6^{4}
WC	(India) R Ramanathan	3	6^{3}
8	(Bulgaria) D Kuzmanov	6	7^{7}

Second round
1	(Chinese Taipei) C-h Tseng	2	4
(United States) N Moreno de Alboran	6	6
(Japan) Y Uchiyama	6	6^{10}	6
7	(Czech Republic) D Svrčina	1	7^{12}	4
Q	(India) S Nagal	3	6	6
LL	(Chinese Taipei) J Jung	6	2	0
(United Kingdom) J Clarke	3	6	6
8	(Bulgaria) D Kuzmanov	6	3	4

Quarterfinals
(United States) N Moreno de Alboran	6	6
(Japan) Y Uchiyama	3	4
Q	(India) S Nagal	6	6
(United Kingdom) J Clarke	1	4

Semifinals
(United States) N Moreno de Alboran	6	6
Q	(India) S Nagal	4	2

=== Bottom half ===
First round
6	(Italy) F Maestrelli	3	4
(Australia) D Sweeny	6	6
Q	(Australia) J McCabe	6	6
(Chinese Taipei) Y-h Hsu	1	4
(Vietnam) NH Lý	3	2
(France) A Cazaux	6	6
(South Korea) S-c Hong	6	6
3	(Austria) S Ofner	4	3
5	(Italy) L Nardi	4	5
Q	(Czech Republic) P Nouza	6	7
Q	(India) M Sasikumar	2	2
(Australia) M Purcell	6	6
WC	(Sweden) L Borg	1	6	2
(Serbia) H Međedović	6	4	6
Q	(Spain) C Sánchez Jover	4	2
2	(Australia) J Duckworth	6	6

Second round
(Australia) D Sweeny	6	6
Q	(Australia) J McCabe	2	1
(France) A Cazaux	6	6
(South Korea) S-c Hong	3	4
Q	(Czech Republic) P Nouza	5	3
(Australia) M Purcell	7	6
(Serbia) H Međedović	2	6^{3}
2	(Australia) J Duckworth	6	7^{7}

Quarterfinals
(Australia) D Sweeny	6^{5}	7^{11}	6
(France) A Cazaux	7^{7}	6^{9}	3
(Australia) M Purcell	6	4	6
2	(Australia) J Duckworth	4	6	4

Semifinals
(Australia) D Sweeny	4	6^{3}
(Australia) M Purcell	6	7^{7}
