= 2025 Chennai Open Challenger – Doubles =

Doubles
- 2025 Chennai Open Challenger

Final
- Champions: (Japan) Shintaro Mochizuki (Japan) Kaito Uesugi
- Runners-up: (India) Saketh Myneni (India) Ramkumar Ramanathan
- Score: 6–4, 6–4

Events
Singles	Doubles
← 2024 ·	Chennai Open Challenger	· 2026 →

Saketh Myneni and Ramkumar Ramanathan were the defending champions but lost in the final to Shintaro Mochizuki and Kaito Uesugi.

Mochizuki and Uesugi won the title after defeating Myneni and Ramanathan 6–4, 6–4 in the final.

== Seeds ==
1. (Chinese Taipei) Ray Ho / (Australia) Matthew Romios (semifinals)
2. (India) Jeevan Nedunchezhiyan / (India) Vijay Sundar Prashanth (semifinals)
3. (India) Saketh Myneni / (India) Ramkumar Ramanathan (final)
4. (Philippines) Francis Alcantara / (Thailand) Pruchya Isaro (quarterfinals)

== Draw ==
=== Key ===
- Q = Qualifier
- WC = Wild card
- LL = Lucky loser
- Alt = Alternate
- SE = Special exempt
- PR = Protected ranking
- ITF = ITF entry
- JE = Junior exempt
- w/o = Walkover
- r = Retired
- d = Defaulted
- SR = Special ranking

=== Draw ===
First round
1	(Chinese Taipei) R Ho (Australia) MC Romios	6	6
(Canada) A Galarneau (Canada) K Stevenson	2	1
PR	(India) S Banthia (India) Parikshit Somani	6	3	[10]
WC	(India) Sai Karteek Reddy Ganta (India) V Vardhan	3	6	[7]
3	(India) S Myneni (India) R Ramanathan	6	6
PR	(Belgium) K Coppejans (Turkey) E Kırkın	3	1
Alt	E Agafonov; E Tiurnev	7^{10}	4	[10]
(Belgium) M Geerts (United Kingdom) B Harris	6^{8}	6	[5]
(Japan) S Mochizuki (Japan) K Uesugi	6	6
Alt	(Switzerland) L Castelnuovo (Ukraine) Eric Vanshelboim	4	0
Alt	(Kazakhstan) T Skatov; A Zakharov	3	6	[7]
4	(Philippines) FC Alcantara (Thailand) P Isaro	6	4	[10]
(France) C Denolly (France) S Gueymard Wayenburg	3	6^{7}
(Zimbabwe) CJ Lock (Japan) R Noguchi	6	7^{9}
WC	(India) Chirag Duhan (India) Dev Javia	3	6	[11]
2	(India) J Nedunchezhiyan (India) VS Prashanth	6	3	[13]

Quarterfinals
1	(Chinese Taipei) R Ho (Australia) MC Romios	7^{7}	7^{7}
PR	(India) S Banthia (India) P Somani	6^{3}	6^{3}
3	(India) S Myneni (India) R Ramanathan	6	6
Alt	E Agafonov; E Tiurnev	3	4
(Japan) S Mochizuki (Japan) K Uesugi	7	6
4	(Philippines) FC Alcantara (Thailand) P Isaro	5	4
(Zimbabwe) CJ Lock (Japan) R Noguchi	2	2
2	(India) J Nedunchezhiyan (India) VS Prashanth	6	6

Semifinals
1	(Chinese Taipei) R Ho (Australia) MC Romios	6^{5}	6^{8}
3	(India) S Myneni (India) R Ramanathan	7^{7}	7^{10}
(Japan) S Mochizuki (Japan) K Uesugi	4	6	[10]
2	(India) J Nedunchezhiyan (India) VS Prashanth	6	4	[6]

Final
3	(India) S Myneni (India) R Ramanathan	4	4
(Japan) S Mochizuki (Japan) K Uesugi	6	6
