= 2024 Chennai Open Challenger – Doubles =

Doubles
- 2024 Chennai Open Challenger

Final
- Champions: (India) Saketh Myneni (India) Ramkumar Ramanathan
- Runners-up: (India) Rithvik Choudary Bollipalli (India) Niki Kaliyanda Poonacha
- Score: 3–6, 6–3, [10–5]

Events
Singles	Doubles
← 2023 ·	Chennai Open Challenger	· 2025 →

Jay Clarke and Arjun Kadhe were the defending champions but only Kadhe chose to defend his title, partnering Hsu Yu-hsiou. Kadhe lost in the quarterfinals to Toshihide Matsui and Kaito Uesugi.

Saketh Myneni and Ramkumar Ramanathan won the title after defeating Rithvik Choudary Bollipalli and Niki Kaliyanda Poonacha 3–6, 6–3, [10–5] in the final.

== Seeds ==
1. (India) Sriram Balaji / (Germany) Andre Begemann (quarterfinals)
2. (Japan) Toshihide Matsui / (Japan) Kaito Uesugi (semifinals)
3. (Chinese Taipei) Ray Ho / (Poland) Piotr Matuszewski (first round)
4. (India) Rithvik Choudary Bollipalli / (India) Niki Kaliyanda Poonacha (final)

== Draw ==
Key

- Q = Qualifier
- WC = Wild card
- LL = Lucky loser
- Alt = Alternate
- ITF = ITF entry
- PR = Protected ranking
- SR = Special ranking
- SE = Special exempt
- JE = Junior exempt
- JR = Junior Accelerator Programme entrant
- CO = College Accelerator Programme entrant
- NG = Next Gen Accelerator Program entrant
- w/o = Walkover
- r = Retired
- d = Defaulted

First round
1	(India) S Balaji (Germany) A Begemann	6	6
(France) C Bittoun Kouzmine (France) M Janvier	3	2
(Italy) E Dalla Valle (Italy) L Nardi	3	6^{5}
(Germany) J Schnaitter (Germany) M Wallner	6	7^{7}
4	(India) RC Bollipalli (India) N Kaliyanda Poonacha	6	6
(Italy) S Napolitano (Spain) O Roca Batalla	2	1
WC	(India) Parikshit Somani (India) Manish Sureshkumar	2	6	[10]
(Tunisia) M Echargui (Italy) G Fonio	6	2	[2]
(France) D Added (France) U Blanchet	6	6
Alt	(Poland) M Kaśnikowski (Ukraine) Eric Vanshelboim	4	4
(India) S Myneni (India) R Ramanathan	7^{7}	6
3	(Chinese Taipei) R Ho (Poland) P Matuszewski	6^{3}	4
(Chinese Taipei) Y-h Hsu (India) A Kadhe	6	6
(Philippines) FC Alcantara (Japan) K Uchida	4	4
WC	(India) SDP Dev (India) Nitin Kumar Sinha	6	4	[9]
2	(Japan) T Matsui (Japan) K Uesugi	3	6	[11]

Quarterfinals
1	(India) S Balaji (Germany) A Begemann	3	4
(Germany) J Schnaitter (Germany) M Wallner	6	6
4	(India) RC Bollipalli (India) N Kaliyanda Poonacha	5	6	[10]
WC	(India) P Somani (India) M Sureshkumar	7	1	[7]
(France) D Added (France) U Blanchet	6	4	[6]
(India) S Myneni (India) R Ramanathan	4	6	[10]
(Chinese Taipei) Y-h Hsu (India) A Kadhe	5	3
2	(Japan) T Matsui (Japan) K Uesugi	7	6

Semifinals
(Germany) J Schnaitter (Germany) M Wallner	3	6	[7]
4	(India) RC Bollipalli (India) N Kaliyanda Poonacha	6	4	[10]
(India) S Myneni (India) R Ramanathan	6	6
2	(Japan) T Matsui (Japan) K Uesugi	3	2

Final
4	(India) RC Bollipalli (India) N Kaliyanda Poonacha	6	3	[5]
(India) S Myneni (India) R Ramanathan	3	6	[10]
