= 2026 Chennai Open Challenger – Singles =

Singles
- 2026 Chennai Open Challenger

Final
- Champion: (Portugal) Frederico Ferreira Silva
- Runner-up: (Argentina) Federico Agustín Gómez
- Score: 6–4, 6–7^{(10–12)}, 6–4

Events
Singles	Doubles
- Chennai Open Challenger

Kyrian Jacquet was the defending champion but chose not to defend his title.

Frederico Ferreira Silva won the title after defeating Federico Agustín Gómez 6–4, 6–7^{(10–12)}, 6–4 in the final.

== Seeds ==
1. (United Kingdom) Jay Clarke (first round)
2. (Argentina) Federico Agustín Gómez (final)
3. (United Kingdom) Oliver Crawford (second round)
4. Ilia Simakin (semifinals)
5. (Japan) Rio Noguchi (first round)
6. (Portugal) Frederico Ferreira Silva (champion)
7. (France) Florent Bax (first round, retired)
8. (India) Sumit Nagal (second round)

== Draw ==
Key

- Q = Qualifier
- WC = Wild card
- LL = Lucky loser
- Alt = Alternate
- ITF = ITF entry
- PR = Protected ranking
- SR = Special ranking
- SE = Special exempt
- JE = Junior exempt
- JR = Junior Accelerator Programme entrant
- CO = College Accelerator Programme entrant
- NG = Next Gen Accelerator Program entrant
- w/o = Walkover
- r = Retired
- d = Defaulted

=== Finals ===
Semifinals
6	(Portugal) Frederico Ferreira Silva	6	6
4	Ilia Simakin	4	2
(Poland) Maks Kaśnikowski	3	6	5
2	(Argentina) Federico Agustín Gómez	6	2	7

Final
6	(Portugal) Frederico Ferreira Silva	6	6^{10}	6
2	(Argentina) Federico Agustín Gómez	4	7^{12}	4

=== Top half ===
First round
1	(United Kingdom) J Clarke	4	4
(Greece) Ioannis Xilas	6	6
(Ukraine) Eric Vanshelboim	6	6
Q	(India) Aditya Vishal Balsekar	0	0
(Italy) A Binda	4	4
(Croatia) D Ajduković	6	6
(India) K Singh	4	4
6	(Portugal) F Ferreira Silva	6	6
4	I Simakin	6	6
(India) M Dhamne	3	2
(United Kingdom) A Gray	3	6^{9}
(Australia) P Sekulic	6	7^{11}
P Bar Biryukov	6	6
Q	(India) Ishaque Eqbal	3	4
(United Kingdom) F Gill	6	1	3
8	(India) S Nagal	1	6	6

Second round
(Greece) I Xilas	6	6
(Ukraine) E Vanshelboim	3	4
(Croatia) D Ajduković	3	4
6	(Portugal) F Ferreira Silva	6	6
4	I Simakin	4	7	7^{7}
(Australia) P Sekulic	6	5	6^{1}
P Bar Biryukov	4	7^{7}	6
8	(India) S Nagal	6	6^{2}	3

Quarterfinals
(Greece) I Xilas	2	4
6	(Portugal) F Ferreira Silva	6	6
4	I Simakin	7^{7}	4	7
P Bar Biryukov	6^{5}	6	5

Semifinals
6	(Portugal) F Ferreira Silva	6	6
4	I Simakin	4	2

=== Bottom half ===
First round
5	(Japan) R Noguchi	6	3	2
WC	(India) Sidharth Rawat	2	6	6
Q	(India) Aryan Lakshmanan	5	2
(Poland) M Kaśnikowski	7	6
Q	(Malaysia) Mitsuki Wei Kang Leong	4	0
(Switzerland) L Castelnuovo	6	6
WC	(India) Digvijaypratap Singh	6^{6}	6	5
3	(United Kingdom) O Crawford	7^{8}	3	7
7	(France) F Bax	7	4	2^{r}
(Kazakhstan) D Yevseyev	5	6	3
(India) M Sasikumar	7	6
Q	(India) Nitin Kumar Sinha	5	3
(Italy) Lorenzo Carboni	6	0
Q	(India) SDP Dev	2	0^{r}
WC	(India) Manish Sureshkumar	1	2
2	(Argentina) FA Gómez	6	6

Second round
WC	(India) S Rawat	2	3
(Poland) M Kaśnikowski	6	6
(Switzerland) L Castelnuovo	1	6	7^{7}
3	(United Kingdom) O Crawford	6	3	6^{5}
(Kazakhstan) D Yevseyev	3	6	6
(India) M Sasikumar	6	2	3
(Italy) L Carboni	3	4
2	(Argentina) FA Gómez	6	6

Quarterfinals
(Poland) M Kaśnikowski	6	7^{7}
(Switzerland) L Castelnuovo	3	6^{5}
(Kazakhstan) D Yevseyev	3	4
2	(Argentina) FA Gómez	6	6

Semifinals
(Poland) M Kaśnikowski	3	6	5
2	(Argentina) FA Gómez	6	2	7
