= 2023 Chennai Open Challenger =

- Date: 13–19 February
- Edition: 3rd
- Surface: Hard
- Location: Chennai, India

Champions

Singles
- (Australia) Max Purcell

Doubles
- (United Kingdom) Jay Clarke / (India) Arjun Kadhe
| ← 2019 · | Chennai Open Challenger | · 2024 → |

The 2023 Chennai Open Challenger was a professional tennis tournament played on hard courts. It was the third edition of the tournament which was part of the 2023 ATP Challenger Tour. It took place in Chennai, India between 13 and 19 February 2023.

== Singles main-draw entrants ==
=== Seeds ===
| Country | Player | Rank^{1} | Seed |
|---|---|---|---|
| TPE | Tseng Chun-hsin | 108 | 1 |
| AUS | James Duckworth | 137 | 2 |
| AUT | Sebastian Ofner | 152 | 3 |
| GBR | Ryan Peniston | 159 | 4 |
| ITA | Luca Nardi | 164 | 5 |
| ITA | Francesco Maestrelli | 183 | 6 |
| CZE | Dalibor Svrčina | 184 | 7 |
| BUL | Dimitar Kuzmanov | 192 | 8 |

- ^{1} Rankings are as of 6 February 2023.

=== Other entrants ===
The following players received wildcards into the singles main draw:

- (Sweden) Leo Borg
- (India) Prajnesh Gunneswaran
- (India) Ramkumar Ramanathan

The following player received entry into the singles main draw using a protected ranking:

- (Australia) Marc Polmans

The following players received entry from the qualifying draw:

- Alibek Kachmazov
- (Australia) James McCabe
- (India) Sumit Nagal
- (Czech Republic) Petr Nouza
- (Spain) Carlos Sánchez Jover
- (India) Mukund Sasikumar

The following player received entry as a lucky loser:

- (Chinese Taipei) Jason Jung

== Champions ==
=== Singles ===
- (Australia) Max Purcell def. (United States) Nicolas Moreno de Alboran 5–7, 7–6^{(7–2)}, 6–4.

=== Doubles ===
- (United Kingdom) Jay Clarke / (India) Arjun Kadhe def. (Austria) Sebastian Ofner / (Croatia) Nino Serdarušić 6–0, 6–4.
