= 2018 Chennai Open Challenger – Singles =

Singles
- 2018 Chennai Open Challenger

Final
- Champion: (Australia) Jordan Thompson
- Runner-up: (India) Yuki Bhambri
- Score: 7–5, 3–6, 7–5

Events
Singles	Doubles
- Chennai Open Challenger

This was the first edition of the tournament.

Jordan Thompson won the title after defeating Yuki Bhambri 7–5, 3–6, 7–5 in the final.

== Seeds ==
1. (Australia) Jordan Thompson (champion)
2. (India) Yuki Bhambri (final)
3. (South Korea) Lee Duck-hee (semifinals)
4. (Egypt) Mohamed Safwat (quarterfinals)
5. (India) Sumit Nagal (first round)
6. (Japan) Yasutaka Uchiyama (quarterfinals)
7. (Spain) Enrique López Pérez (second round, retired)
8. (India) Prajnesh Gunneswaran (first round)

== Draw ==
Key

- Q = Qualifier
- WC = Wild card
- LL = Lucky loser
- Alt = Alternate
- ITF = ITF entry
- PR = Protected ranking
- SR = Special ranking
- SE = Special exempt
- JE = Junior exempt
- JR = Junior Accelerator Programme entrant
- CO = College Accelerator Programme entrant
- NG = Next Gen Accelerator Program entrant
- w/o = Walkover
- r = Retired
- d = Defaulted

=== Finals ===
Semifinals
1	(Australia) Jordan Thompson	6	7^{7}
(Spain) Pedro Martínez	1	6^{5}
3	(South Korea) Lee Duck-hee	5	2
2	(India) Yuki Bhambri	7	6

Final
1	(Australia) Jordan Thompson	7	3	7
2	(India) Yuki Bhambri	5	6	5

=== Top half ===
First round
1	(Australia) J Thompson	6	6
(Egypt) K-M Maamoun	4	2
(India) S Balaji	4	6	5
Q	(Thailand) W Trongcharoenchaikul	6	3	7
WC	(India) Manish Sureshkumar	4	2
(Serbia) D Petrović	6	6
(Belgium) K Coppejans	5	4
7	(Spain) E López Pérez	7	6
4	(Egypt) M Safwat	6	6
(Italy) A Bega	4	3
Q	(India) A Kadhe	6^{5}	6	6
PR	(India) S Myneni	7^{7}	3	4
(Monaco) L Catarina	6	6
WC	(India) Nitin Kumar Sinha	3	4
(Spain) P Martínez	6	6
8	(India) P Gunneswaran	1	4

Second round
1	(Australia) J Thompson	6	6
Q	(Thailand) W Trongcharoenchaikul	3	2
(Serbia) D Petrović	6	0
7	(Spain) E López Pérez	4	0^{r}
4	(Egypt) M Safwat	6	6
Q	(India) A Kadhe	4	2
(Monaco) L Catarina	6^{2}	0
(Spain) P Martínez	7^{7}	6

Quarterfinals
1	(Australia) J Thompson	6	3
(Serbia) D Petrović	4	0^{r}
4	(Egypt) M Safwat	5	2
(Spain) P Martínez	7	6

Semifinals
1	(Australia) J Thompson	6	7^{7}
(Spain) P Martínez	1	6^{5}

=== Bottom half ===
First round
5	(India) S Nagal	3	3
(France) A Escoffier	6	6
(India) S Mukund	3	2
(Spain) G Granollers	6	6
(Russia) I Nedelko	6	4^{r}
Q	(India) Abhinav Sanjeev Shanmugam	3	5
WC	(India) VS Prashanth	3	4
3	(South Korea) D-h Lee	6	6
6	(Japan) Y Uchiyama	6	7^{7}
(Australia) M Purcell	1	6^{5}
(Turkey) C İlkel	4	7^{8}	6
(Kazakhstan) D Popko	6	6^{6}	2
WC	(India) D Suresh	2	0
Q	(India) Sidharth Rawat	6	6
(Spain) B Zapata Miralles	1	6^{3}
2	(India) Y Bhambri	6	7^{7}

Second round
(France) A Escoffier	7^{7}	6
(Spain) G Granollers	6^{2}	2
Q	(India) AS Shanmugam	2	4
3	(South Korea) D-h Lee	6	6
6	(Japan) Y Uchiyama	6	7
(Turkey) C İlkel	4	5
Q	(India) S Rawat	2	3
2	(India) Y Bhambri	6	6

Quarterfinals
(France) A Escoffier	2	6	3
3	(South Korea) D-h Lee	6	3	6
6	(Japan) Y Uchiyama	7	2	4
2	(India) Y Bhambri	5	6	6

Semifinals
3	(South Korea) D-h Lee	5	2
2	(India) Y Bhambri	7	6
