= 2024 Chennai Open Challenger – Singles =

Singles
- 2024 Chennai Open Challenger

Final
- Champion: (India) Sumit Nagal
- Runner-up: (Italy) Luca Nardi
- Score: 6–1, 6–4

Events
Singles	Doubles
← 2023 ·	Chennai Open Challenger	· 2025 →

Max Purcell was the defending champion but chose not to defend his title.

Sumit Nagal won the title after defeating Luca Nardi 6–1, 6–4 in the final.

== Seeds ==
1. (Italy) Luca Nardi (final)
2. (India) Sumit Nagal (champion)
3. (Czech Republic) Dalibor Svrčina (semifinals)
4. (France) Ugo Blanchet (second round)
5. (Italy) Stefano Napolitano (quarterfinals)
6. (Spain) Oriol Roca Batalla (second round)
7. (Tunisia) Aziz Dougaz (first round)
8. (Chinese Taipei) Hsu Yu-hsiou (first round)

== Draw ==
Key

- Q = Qualifier
- WC = Wild card
- LL = Lucky loser
- Alt = Alternate
- ITF = ITF entry
- PR = Protected ranking
- SR = Special ranking
- SE = Special exempt
- JE = Junior exempt
- JR = Junior Accelerator Programme entrant
- CO = College Accelerator Programme entrant
- NG = Next Gen Accelerator Program entrant
- w/o = Walkover
- r = Retired
- d = Defaulted

=== Finals ===
Semifinals
1	(Italy) Luca Nardi	6	4	7^{8}
(Chinese Taipei) Tseng Chun-hsin	4	6	6^{6}
3	(Czech Republic) Dalibor Svrčina	3	4
2	(India) Sumit Nagal	6	6

Final
1	(Italy) Luca Nardi	1	4
2	(India) Sumit Nagal	6	6

=== Top half ===
First round
1	(Italy) L Nardi	6	6
Q	(Ukraine) Eric Vanshelboim	2	2
Q	(Poland) Olaf Pieczkowski	6	4	6^{2}
(Australia) B Tomic	2	6	7^{7}
Alt	(Australia) A Santillan	6	4	1^{r}
(France) D Added	2	6	4
(Japan) K Uchida	1	2
5	(Italy) S Napolitano	6	6
4	(France) U Blanchet	6	3	7^{7}
Q	(Czech Republic) J Forejtek	3	6	6^{5}
WC	(Georgia (country)) N Basilashvili	4	4
(Chinese Taipei) C-h Tseng	6	6
Q	A Zakharov	6	6^{2}	4
(Italy) E Dalla Valle	3	7^{7}	6
WC	(India) R Ramanathan	6^{3}	2
6	(Spain) O Roca Batalla	7^{7}	6

Second round
1	(Italy) L Nardi	7	6
(Australia) B Tomic	5	3
(France) D Added	2	1
5	(Italy) S Napolitano	6	6
4	(France) U Blanchet	0	6	2
(Chinese Taipei) C-h Tseng	6	4	6
(Italy) E Dalla Valle	6	7^{7}
6	(Spain) O Roca Batalla	4	6^{2}

Quarterfinals
1	(Italy) L Nardi	6	3	6
5	(Italy) S Napolitano	4	6	0
(Chinese Taipei) C-h Tseng	7	6
(Italy) E Dalla Valle	5	2

Semifinals
1	(Italy) L Nardi	6	4	7^{8}
(Chinese Taipei) C-h Tseng	4	6	6^{6}

=== Bottom half ===
First round
8	(Chinese Taipei) Y-h Hsu	7^{7}	2	5
(Tunisia) M Echargui	6^{5}	6	7
(Poland) M Kaśnikowski	3	6	5
WC	(India) M Sasikumar	6	4	7
(Chinese Taipei) T-l Wu	2^{r}
E Donskoy	3
Q	B Bobrov	3	6	2
3	(Czech Republic) D Svrčina	6	2	6
7	(Tunisia) A Dougaz	3	3
Alt	(Italy) Samuel Vincent Ruggeri	6	6
(Czech Republic) D Palán	6	6
Alt	(France) A Weber	1	4
(France) M Janvier	4	6	5
(Italy) G Fonio	6	3	7
Q	(India) SDP Dev	1	2
2	(India) S Nagal	6	6

Second round
(Tunisia) M Echargui	6^{4}	3
WC	(India) M Sasikumar	7^{7}	6
E Donskoy	2	6	2
3	(Czech Republic) D Svrčina	6	0	6
Alt	(Italy) S Vincent Ruggeri	2	6	4
(Czech Republic) D Palán	6	2	6
(Italy) G Fonio	5	2
2	(India) S Nagal	7	6

Quarterfinals
WC	(India) M Sasikumar	7^{8}	2	4
3	(Czech Republic) D Svrčina	6^{6}	6	6
(Czech Republic) D Palán	3	3
2	(India) S Nagal	6	6

Semifinals
3	(Czech Republic) D Svrčina	3	4
2	(India) S Nagal	6	6
