= 2024 Seoul Open Challenger – Doubles =

Doubles
- 2024 Seoul Open Challenger

Final
- Champions: (India) Saketh Myneni (India) Ramkumar Ramanathan
- Runners-up: (United States) Vasil Kirkov (Netherlands) Bart Stevens
- Score: 6–4, 4–6, [10–3]

Events
Singles	Doubles
← 2023 ·	Seoul Open Challenger	· 2025 →

Max Purcell and Yasutaka Uchiyama were the defending champions but chose not to defend their title.

Saketh Myneni and Ramkumar Ramanathan won the title after defeating Vasil Kirkov and Bart Stevens 6–4, 4–6, [10–3] in the final.

== Seeds ==
1. (United States) Evan King / (United States) Reese Stalder (first round)
2. (Colombia) Cristian Rodríguez / (Australia) Matthew Romios (first round)
3. (India) Anirudh Chandrasekar / (India) Niki Kaliyanda Poonacha (quarterfinals)
4. (United Kingdom) David Stevenson / (United Kingdom) Marcus Willis (quarterfinals)

== Draw ==
=== Key ===
- Q = Qualifier
- WC = Wild card
- LL = Lucky loser
- Alt = Alternate
- SE = Special exempt
- PR = Protected ranking
- ITF = ITF entry
- JE = Junior exempt
- w/o = Walkover
- r = Retired
- d = Defaulted
- SR = Special ranking

=== Draw ===
First round
1	(United States) E King (United States) R Stalder	6	3	[3]
(South Korea) Y-s Chung (Chinese Taipei) Y-h Hsu	1	6	[10]
(United States) N Moreno de Alboran (New Zealand) R Statham	6	7
PR	(Thailand) P Isaro (India) D Sharan	3	5
4	(United Kingdom) D Stevenson (United Kingdom) M Willis	2	7^{7}	[10]
WC	(South Korea) Shin San-hui (South Korea) Sim Sung-been	6	6^{4}	[8]
(United States) V Kirkov (Netherlands) B Stevens	7	7^{7}
(Japan) R Noguchi (South Korea) Shin Woo-bin	5	6^{5}
(South Korea) J-s Nam (United Kingdom) J Paris	6	6
(Chinese Taipei) R Ho (Chinese Taipei) C-h Tseng	4	3
(France) A Escoffier (France) B Paire	3	5
3	(India) A Chandrasekar (India) N Kaliyanda Poonacha	6	7
WC	(South Korea) Jeong Yeong-seok (South Korea) U-s Park	6	6
(Japan) T Matsui (Japan) K Uesugi	3	3
PR	(India) S Myneni (India) R Ramanathan	7^{7}	6
2	(Colombia) C Rodríguez (Australia) MC Romios	6^{5}	4

Quarterfinals
(South Korea) Y-s Chung (Chinese Taipei) Y-h Hsu	3	6	[4]
(United States) N Moreno de Alboran (New Zealand) R Statham	6	4	[10]
4	(United Kingdom) D Stevenson (United Kingdom) M Willis	4	2
(United States) V Kirkov (Netherlands) B Stevens	6	6
(South Korea) J-s Nam (United Kingdom) J Paris	6	6
3	(India) A Chandrasekar (India) N Kaliyanda Poonacha	1	3
WC	(South Korea) Y-s Jeong (South Korea) U-s Park	3	1
PR	(India) S Myneni (India) R Ramanathan	6	6

Semifinals
(United States) N Moreno de Alboran (New Zealand) R Statham	7^{7}	3	[7]
(United States) V Kirkov (Netherlands) B Stevens	6^{5}	6	[10]
(South Korea) J-s Nam (United Kingdom) J Paris	6^{7}	4
PR	(India) S Myneni (India) R Ramanathan	7^{9}	6

Final
(United States) V Kirkov (Netherlands) B Stevens	4	6	[3]
PR	(India) S Myneni (India) R Ramanathan	6	4	[10]
