= 2019 Chennai Open Challenger – Singles =

Singles
- 2019 Chennai Open Challenger

Final
- Champion: (France) Corentin Moutet
- Runner-up: (Australia) Andrew Harris
- Score: 6–3, 6–3

Events
Singles	Doubles
- Chennai Open Challenger

Jordan Thompson was the defending champion but chose not to defend his title.

Corentin Moutet won the title after defeating Andrew Harris 6–3, 6–3 in the final.

== Seeds ==
All seeds receive a bye into the second round.

1. (India) Prajnesh Gunneswaran (semifinals)
2. (France) Corentin Moutet (champion)
3. (Egypt) Mohamed Safwat (third round)
4. (Italy) Gianluca Mager (third round)
5. (Spain) Alejandro Davidovich Fokina (quarterfinals)
6. (South Korea) Kwon Soon-woo (third round)
7. (Australia) James Duckworth (quarterfinals)
8. (South Korea) Lee Duck-hee (third round)
9. (Portugal) Gastão Elias (third round)
10. (Spain) Nicola Kuhn (quarterfinals)
11. (India) Saketh Myneni (third round)
12. (Australia) Maverick Banes (second round)
13. (Dominican Republic) José Hernández-Fernández (second round)
14. (Lithuania) Laurynas Grigelis (third round)
15. (Chinese Taipei) Yang Tsung-hua (second round)
16. (India) Sasikumar Mukund (semifinals)

== Draw ==
Key

- Q = Qualifier
- WC = Wild card
- LL = Lucky loser
- Alt = Alternate
- ITF = ITF entry
- PR = Protected ranking
- SR = Special ranking
- SE = Special exempt
- JE = Junior exempt
- JR = Junior Accelerator Programme entrant
- CO = College Accelerator Programme entrant
- NG = Next Gen Accelerator Program entrant
- w/o = Walkover
- r = Retired
- d = Defaulted

=== Finals ===
Quarterfinals
1	(India) Prajnesh Gunneswaran	6	6
7	(Australia) James Duckworth	4	3
(Australia) Andrew Harris	1	7^{8}	6
5	(Spain) Alejandro Davidovich Fokina	6	6^{6}	2
(United Kingdom) Brydan Klein	2	6	6^{3}
16	(India) Sasikumar Mukund	6	3	7^{7}
10	(Spain) Nicola Kuhn	7	3	4
2	(France) Corentin Moutet	5	6	6

Semifinals
1	(India) Prajnesh Gunneswaran	4	6	0
(Australia) Andrew Harris	6	3	6
16	(India) Sasikumar Mukund	6	4	2
2	(France) Corentin Moutet	3	6	6

Final
(Australia) Andrew Harris	3	3
2	(France) Corentin Moutet	6	6

=== Top half ===
==== Section 1 ====
First round
PR	(United States) D Nguyen	3	2
PR	(Germany) D Altmaier	6	6
(India) A Kadhe	6	6
ITF	(Russia) I Nedelko	4	1
(Australia) B Ellis	6	6
WC	(India) Siddharth Vishwakarma	2	2
(Australia) D Kelly	6^{6}	3
Alt	(Russia) I Gakhov	7^{8}	6

Second round
1	(India) P Gunneswaran	6	6
PR	(Germany) D Altmaier	4	4
(India) A Kadhe	6	6
13	(Dominican Republic) J Hernández-Fernández	3	2
9	(Portugal) G Elias	6	7^{7}
(Australia) B Ellis	2	6^{4}
Alt	(Russia) I Gakhov	6^{2}	5
7	(Australia) J Duckworth	7^{7}	7

Third round
1	(India) P Gunneswaran	6	6
(India) A Kadhe	4	2
9	(Portugal) G Elias	6	5	5
7	(Australia) J Duckworth	4	7	7

Quarterfinals
1	(India) P Gunneswaran	6	6
7	(Australia) J Duckworth	4	3

==== Section 2 ====
First round
Q	(Japan) K Uesugi	6	3	6^{8}
(United States) C Altamirano	1	6	7^{10}
(Australia) A Harris	6	6
(Australia) A Vukic	4	4
(Spain) Carlos Boluda-Purkiss	2	6	2
WC	(India) VS Prashanth	6	2	6
WC	(India) Abhinav Sanjeev Shanmugam	3	4
(Japan) Renta Tokuda	6	6

Second round
4	(Italy) G Mager	6	6
(United States) C Altamirano	3	1
(Australia) A Harris	6	6
15	(Chinese Taipei) T-h Yang	2	1
11	(India) S Myneni	6	6
WC	(India) VS Prashanth	4	3
(Japan) R Tokuda	6	2	3
5	(Spain) A Davidovich Fokina	3	6	6

Third round
4	(Italy) G Mager	6^{2}	6^{2}
(Australia) A Harris	7^{7}	7^{7}
11	(India) S Myneni	3	6^{3}
5	(Spain) A Davidovich Fokina	6	7^{7}

Quarterfinals
(Australia) A Harris	1	7^{8}	6
5	(Spain) A Davidovich Fokina	6	6^{6}	2

=== Bottom half ===
==== Section 3 ====
First round
Q	(Russia) A Zhurbin	6	6
(Spain) R Ojeda Lara	2	4
WC	(India) Manish Sureshkumar	2	3
(United Kingdom) B Klein	6	6
(Chinese Taipei) T-l Wu	4	5
(Germany) S Fanselow	6	7
(New Zealand) R Statham	4	4
(Italy) A Pellegrino	6	6

Second round
6	(South Korea) S-w Kwon	6	6
Q	(Russia) A Zhurbin	1	2
(United Kingdom) B Klein	6	6
12	(Australia) M Banes	4	1
16	(India) S Mukund	6	6
(Germany) S Fanselow	3	1
(Italy) A Pellegrino	3	5
3	(Egypt) M Safwat	6	7

Third round
6	(South Korea) S-w Kwon	4	6	3
(United Kingdom) B Klein	6	4	6
16	(India) S Mukund	6	6
3	(Egypt) M Safwat	3	4

Quarterfinals
(United Kingdom) B Klein	2	6	6^{3}
16	(India) S Mukund	6	3	7^{7}

==== Section 4 ====
First round
ITF	(Spain) D Pérez Sanz	3	2
(India) S Nagal	6	6
(France) A Escoffier	6	6
ITF	(Russia) E Tiurnev	2	2
(Australia) B Mousley	7^{7}	1	3
WC	(Vietnam) NH Lý	6^{4}	6	6
(Australia) L Saville	7^{9}	6
ITF	(Tunisia) M Echargui	6^{7}	1

Second round
8	(South Korea) D-h Lee	6	6
(India) S Nagal	3	4
(France) A Escoffier	6	6^{5}	0^{r}
10	(Spain) N Kuhn	4	7^{7}	4
14	(Lithuania) L Grigelis	4	6	6
WC	(Vietnam) NH Lý	6	2	1
(Australia) L Saville	2	7^{7}	4
2	(France) C Moutet	6	6^{1}	6

Third round
8	(South Korea) D-h Lee	4	4
10	(Spain) N Kuhn	6	6
14	(Lithuania) L Grigelis	2	3
2	(France) C Moutet	6	6

Quarterfinals
10	(Spain) N Kuhn	7	3	4
2	(France) C Moutet	5	6	6
