= 2024 Seoul Open Challenger – Singles =

Singles
- 2024 Seoul Open Challenger

Final
- Champion: (Georgia (country)) Nikoloz Basilashvili
- Runner-up: (Japan) Taro Daniel
- Score: 7–5, 6–4

Events
Singles	Doubles
- Seoul Open Challenger

Bu Yunchaokete was the defending champion but chose not to defend his title.

Nikoloz Basilashvili won the title after defeating Taro Daniel 7–5, 6–4 in the final.

== Seeds ==
1. (Japan) Taro Daniel (final)
2. (United States) Mackenzie McDonald (second round)
3. (United States) Nicolas Moreno de Alboran (quarterfinals)
4. (Chinese Taipei) Tseng Chun-hsin (first round)
5. (South Korea) Hong Seong-chan (withdrew)
6. (Hong Kong) Coleman Wong (second round)
7. (France) Térence Atmane (first round)
8. (Japan) Sho Shimabukuro (second round)

== Draw ==
Key

- Q = Qualifier
- WC = Wild card
- LL = Lucky loser
- Alt = Alternate
- ITF = ITF entry
- PR = Protected ranking
- SR = Special ranking
- SE = Special exempt
- JE = Junior exempt
- JR = Junior Accelerator Programme entrant
- CO = College Accelerator Programme entrant
- NG = Next Gen Accelerator Program entrant
- w/o = Walkover
- r = Retired
- d = Defaulted

=== Finals ===
Semifinals
1	(Japan) Taro Daniel	6	6
(Austria) Jurij Rodionov	3	2
(France) Antoine Escoffier
(Georgia (country)) Nikoloz Basilashvili	w/o

Final
1	(Japan) Taro Daniel	5	4
(Georgia (country)) Nikoloz Basilashvili	7	6

=== Top half ===
First round
1	(Japan) T Daniel	7^{7}	4	7
(France) B Paire	6^{4}	6	5
(Czech Republic) D Svrčina	6	6
WC	(South Korea) Shin San-hui	3	0
Q	(Thailand) K Samrej	6	6
Q	(Italy) J Ocleppo	1	4
(China) Y Bai	3	6	3
6	(Hong Kong) C Wong	6	3	6
3	(United States) N Moreno de Alboran	7^{7}	6^{5}	6
(Sweden) E Ymer	6^{4}	7^{7}	4
(Belgium) A Blockx	6	7
(Chinese Taipei) Y-h Hsu	2	5
Q	(Japan) K Uchida	4	6^{9}
(Austria) J Rodionov	6	7^{11}
(France) M Janvier	2	4
8	(Japan) S Shimabukuro	6	6

Second round
1	(Japan) T Daniel	6	6
(Czech Republic) D Svrčina	1	4
Q	(Thailand) K Samrej	6^{1}	7	6
6	(Hong Kong) C Wong	7^{7}	5	4
3	(United States) N Moreno de Alboran	7^{9}	6
(Belgium) A Blockx	6^{7}	1
(Austria) J Rodionov	7^{7}	7^{7}
8	(Japan) S Shimabukuro	6^{3}	6^{2}

Quarterfinals
1	(Japan) T Daniel	6	6
Q	(Thailand) K Samrej	4	4
3	(United States) N Moreno de Alboran	7^{7}	3	4
(Austria) J Rodionov	6^{3}	6	6

Semifinals
1	(Japan) T Daniel	6	6
(Austria) J Rodionov	3	2

=== Bottom half ===
First round
Q	(China) Y Zhou	4	6	1
(France) A Escoffier	6	3	6
(India) R Ramanathan	4	4
Q	(Japan) K Uesugi	6	6
WC	(South Korea) Y-s Chung	5	3
WC	(South Korea) H Chung	7	6
(Australia) L Tu	6	6
4	(Chinese Taipei) C-h Tseng	2	1
7	(France) T Atmane	3	6	4
(Georgia (country)) N Basilashvili	6	3	6
(Japan) R Noguchi	4	4
(Chinese Taipei) T-l Wu	6	6
(Netherlands) G den Ouden	7	4	4
Q	(Japan) H Moriya	5	6	6
LL	(China) J Cui	3	0
2	(United States) M McDonald	6	6

Second round
(France) A Escoffier	6	7^{7}
Q	(Japan) K Uesugi	4	6^{1}
WC	(South Korea) H Chung	6	3	1
(Australia) L Tu	4	6	6
(Georgia (country)) N Basilashvili	6	6^{3}	6
(Chinese Taipei) T-l Wu	2	7^{7}	4
Q	(Japan) H Moriya	6	0	6
2	(United States) M McDonald	3	6	4

Quarterfinals
(France) A Escoffier	6	6
(Australia) L Tu	0	4
(Georgia (country)) N Basilashvili	6	6
Q	(Japan) H Moriya	3	4

Semifinals
(France) A Escoffier
(Georgia (country)) N Basilashvili	w/o
