= 2026 Chennai Open Challenger – Doubles =

Doubles
- 2026 Chennai Open Challenger

Final
- Champions: (Thailand) Pruchya Isaro (India) Niki Kaliyanda Poonacha
- Runners-up: (United Kingdom) Jay Clarke (India) Mukund Sasikumar
- Score: 6–4, 6–4

Events
Singles	Doubles
- Chennai Open Challenger

Shintaro Mochizuki and Kaito Uesugi were the defending champions but chose not to defend their title.

Pruchya Isaro and Niki Kaliyanda Poonacha won the title after defeating Jay Clarke and Mukund Sasikumar 6–4, 6–4 in the final.

== Seeds ==
1. (Thailand) Pruchya Isaro / (India) Niki Kaliyanda Poonacha (champions)
2. (India) Siddhant Banthia / (India) Saketh Myneni (quarterfinals)
3. (India) S D Prajwal Dev / (India) Nitin Kumar Sinha (semifinals)
4. (Switzerland) Luca Castelnuovo / (Japan) Rio Noguchi (quarterfinals)

== Draw ==
Key

- Q = Qualifier
- WC = Wild card
- LL = Lucky loser
- Alt = Alternate
- ITF = ITF entry
- PR = Protected ranking
- SR = Special ranking
- SE = Special exempt
- JE = Junior exempt
- JR = Junior Accelerator Programme entrant
- CO = College Accelerator Programme entrant
- NG = Next Gen Accelerator Program entrant
- w/o = Walkover
- r = Retired
- d = Defaulted

First round
1	(Thailand) P Isaro (India) N Kaliyanda Poonacha	6	6
(India) Sai Karteek Reddy Ganta (India) Digvijaypratap Singh	4	2
WC	(India) Lohithaksha Bathrinath (India) Abhinav Sanjeev Shanmugam	6	2	[10]
(India) M Dhamne (India) Atharva Sharma	3	6	[8]
3	(India) SDP Dev (India) Nitin Kumar Sinha	7^{7}	6
P Bar Biryukov; I Simakin	6^{3}	1
(India) Ishaque Eqbal (India) Manish Sureshkumar	3	6	[10]
Alt	(United Kingdom) Carl Holder (India) Raghav Jaisinghani	6	1	[3]
(United Kingdom) F Gill (United Kingdom) A Gray	6	7^{7}
(Philippines) FC Alcantara (India) A Kalyanpur	2	6^{5}
(Italy) A Binda (Kazakhstan) G Lomakin	2	2
4	(Switzerland) L Castelnuovo (Japan) R Noguchi	6	6
(United Kingdom) J Clarke (India) M Sasikumar	6	6
WC	(India) Aryan Lakshmanan (India) Aditya Vishal Balsekar	3	4
(Ukraine) Eric Vanshelboim (Kazakhstan) D Yevseyev	6	1	[2]
2	(India) S Banthia (India) S Myneni	2	6	[10]

Quarterfinals
1	(Thailand) P Isaro (India) N Kaliyanda Poonacha	6	6
WC	(India) L Bathrinath (India) AS Shanmugam	4	1
3	(India) SDP Dev (India) NK Sinha	4	6	[10]
(India) I Eqbal (India) M Sureshkumar	6	2	[8]
(United Kingdom) F Gill (United Kingdom) A Gray	7^{7}	7^{7}
4	(Switzerland) L Castelnuovo (Japan) R Noguchi	6^{2}	6^{5}
(United Kingdom) J Clarke (India) M Sasikumar	7	6
2	(India) S Banthia (India) S Myneni	5	4

Semifinals
1	(Thailand) P Isaro (India) N Kaliyanda Poonacha	6	6
3	(India) SDP Dev (India) NK Sinha	4	1
(United Kingdom) F Gill (United Kingdom) A Gray	6^{7}	6	[11]
(United Kingdom) J Clarke (India) M Sasikumar	7^{9}	4	[13]

Final
1	(Thailand) P Isaro (India) N Kaliyanda Poonacha	6	6
(United Kingdom) J Clarke (India) M Sasikumar	4	4
