= 2018 Chennai Open Challenger – Doubles =

Doubles
- 2018 Chennai Open Challenger

Final
- Champions: (India) Sriram Balaji (India) Vishnu Vardhan
- Runners-up: (Turkey) Cem İlkel (Serbia) Danilo Petrović
- Score: 7–6^{(7–5)}, 5–7, [10–5]

Events
Singles	Doubles
- Chennai Open Challenger

This was the first edition of the tournament.

Sriram Balaji and Vishnu Vardhan won the title after defeating Cem İlkel and Danilo Petrović 7–6^{(7–5)}, 5–7, [10–5] in the final.

== Seeds ==
1. (Thailand) Sanchai Ratiwatana / (Thailand) Sonchat Ratiwatana (semifinals)
2. (India) Sriram Balaji / (India) Vishnu Vardhan (champions)
3. (Spain) Gerard Granollers / (Japan) Yasutaka Uchiyama (first round)
4. (Switzerland) Luca Margaroli / (India) Saketh Myneni (semifinals)

== Draw ==
Key

- Q = Qualifier
- WC = Wild card
- LL = Lucky loser
- Alt = Alternate
- ITF = ITF entry
- PR = Protected ranking
- SR = Special ranking
- SE = Special exempt
- JE = Junior exempt
- JR = Junior Accelerator Programme entrant
- CO = College Accelerator Programme entrant
- NG = Next Gen Accelerator Program entrant
- w/o = Walkover
- r = Retired
- d = Defaulted

First round
1	(Thailand) Sa Ratiwatana (Thailand) So Ratiwatana	6	6
(India) C Sood (India) L Sood	0	3
(Serbia) N Čačić (Russia) I Nedelko	0^{r}
WC	(India) Kunal Anand (India) Anvit Bendre	2
3	(Spain) G Granollers (Japan) Y Uchiyama	5	3
(Turkey) C İlkel (Serbia) D Petrović	7	6
(India) P Gunneswaran (India) VS Prashanth	7^{7}	6
WC	(India) A Kadhe (India) D Suresh	6^{3}	1
(Spain) P Martínez (India) S Nagal	3	0^{r}
(Turkey) T Altuna (Egypt) M Safwat	6	0
WC	(India) A Kalyanpur (India) S Mukund	4	3
4	(Switzerland) L Margaroli (India) S Myneni	6	6
(Italy) A Bega (Belgium) K Coppejans	6	6
(Monaco) L Catarina (Australia) M Purcell	2	3
(Kazakhstan) D Popko (Spain) B Zapata Miralles	6^{8}	1
2	(India) S Balaji (India) V Vardhan	7^{10}	6

Quarterfinals
1	(Thailand) Sa Ratiwatana (Thailand) So Ratiwatana	6	6
WC	(India) K Anand (India) A Bendre	0	2
(Turkey) C İlkel (Serbia) D Petrović	6	2	[10]
(India) P Gunneswaran (India) VS Prashanth	4	6	[4]
(Turkey) T Altuna (Egypt) M Safwat	7^{7}	3	[11]
4	(Switzerland) L Margaroli (India) S Myneni	6^{4}	6	[13]
(Italy) A Bega (Belgium) K Coppejans	5	3
2	(India) S Balaji (India) V Vardhan	7	6

Semifinals
1	(Thailand) Sa Ratiwatana (Thailand) So Ratiwatana	6^{5}	6	[8]
(Turkey) C İlkel (Serbia) D Petrović	7^{7}	2	[10]
4	(Switzerland) L Margaroli (India) S Myneni	3	5
2	(India) S Balaji (India) V Vardhan	6	7

Final
(Turkey) C İlkel (Serbia) D Petrović	6^{5}	7	[5]
2	(India) S Balaji (India) V Vardhan	7^{7}	5	[10]
