= 2023 Chennai Open Challenger – Doubles =

Doubles
- 2023 Chennai Open Challenger

Final
- Champions: (United Kingdom) Jay Clarke (India) Arjun Kadhe
- Runners-up: (Austria) Sebastian Ofner (Croatia) Nino Serdarušić
- Score: 6–0, 6–4

Events
| Singles | Doubles |
- Chennai Open Challenger

Gianluca Mager and Andrea Pellegrino were the defending champions but chose not to defend their title.

Jay Clarke and Arjun Kadhe won the title after defeating Sebastian Ofner and Nino Serdarušić 6–0, 6–4 in the final.

== Seeds ==
1. (India) Sriram Balaji / (India) Jeevan Nedunchezhiyan (semifinals)
2. (Australia) Marc Polmans / (Australia) Max Purcell (first round)
3. (South Korea) Nam Ji-sung / (South Korea) Song Min-kyu (quarterfinals)
4. (India) Anirudh Chandrasekar / (India) Vijay Sundar Prashanth (first round)

== Draw ==
Key

- Q = Qualifier
- WC = Wild card
- LL = Lucky loser
- Alt = Alternate
- ITF = ITF entry
- PR = Protected ranking
- SR = Special ranking
- SE = Special exempt
- JE = Junior exempt
- JR = Junior Accelerator Programme entrant
- CO = College Accelerator Programme entrant
- NG = Next Gen Accelerator Program entrant
- w/o = Walkover
- r = Retired
- d = Defaulted

First round
1 | (India) S Balaji (India) J Nedunchezhiyan | 6 | 7
(Portugal) F Ferreira Silva (United States) N Moreno de Alboran | 4 | 5
(Chinese Taipei) Y-h Hsu (Indonesia) C Rungkat | 6^{12} | 1^{r}
WC | (India) S Nagal (India) M Sasikumar | 7^{14} | 2
4 | (India) A Chandrasekar (India) VS Prashanth | 7^{9} | 1 | [7]
(United Kingdom) R Peniston (Czech Republic) D Svrčina | 6^{7} | 6 | [10]
(Bulgaria) D Kuzmanov (Serbia) H Međedović | 5 | 4
(Austria) S Ofner (Croatia) N Serdarušić | 7 | 6
Alt | (Australia) D Kelly (Australia) D Sweeny | 6 | 3 | [7]
(United Kingdom) J Clarke (India) A Kadhe | 3 | 6 | [10]
WC | (India) R Ramanathan (India) V Vardhan | 6 | 6^{4} | [5]
3 | (South Korea) J-s Nam (South Korea) M-k Song | 1 | 7^{7} | [10]
(Italy) F Maestrelli (Italy) L Nardi | 6 | 6
(Australia) C Puttergill (Australia) A Santillan | 2 | 3
(Czech Republic) P Nouza (Czech Republic) A Paulson | 6 | 6
2 | (Australia) M Polmans (Australia) M Purcell | 4 | 4

Quarterfinals
1 | (India) S Balaji (India) J Nedunchezhiyan | 7^{7} | 6
WC | (India) S Nagal (India) M Sasikumar | 6^{5} | 0
(United Kingdom) R Peniston (Czech Republic) D Svrčina | 1 | 7^{7} | [4]
(Austria) S Ofner (Croatia) N Serdarušić | 6 | 6^{3} | [10]
(United Kingdom) J Clarke (India) A Kadhe | 1 | 7^{10} | [10]
3 | (South Korea) J-s Nam (South Korea) M-k Song | 6 | 6^{8} | [8]
(Italy) F Maestrelli (Italy) L Nardi | 3 | 4
(Czech Republic) P Nouza (Czech Republic) A Paulson | 6 | 6

Semifinals
1 | (India) S Balaji (India) J Nedunchezhiyan | 6 | 6^{5} | [4]
(Austria) S Ofner (Croatia) N Serdarušić | 4 | 7^{7} | [10]
(United Kingdom) J Clarke (India) A Kadhe | 7 | 4 | [10]
(Czech Republic) P Nouza (Czech Republic) A Paulson | 5 | 6 | [8]

Final
(Austria) S Ofner (Croatia) N Serdarušić | 0 | 4
(United Kingdom) J Clarke (India) A Kadhe | 6 | 6
