= 2018 Chennai Open Challenger =

- Date: 12–17 February
- Edition: 1st
- Draw: 32S / 16D
- Surface: Hard
- Location: Chennai, India

Champions

Singles
- (Australia) Jordan Thompson

Doubles
- (India) Sriram Balaji / (India) Vishnu Vardhan
Chennai Open Challenger	· 2019 →

The 2018 Chennai Open Challenger was a professional tennis tournament played on hard courts. It was the first edition of the tournament which was part of the 2018 ATP Challenger Tour. It took place in Chennai, India between 12 and 17 February 2018.

== Singles main-draw entrants ==
=== Seeds ===
Country	Player	Rank^{1}	Seed
AUS	Jordan Thompson	103	1
IND	Yuki Bhambri	112	2
KOR	Lee Duck-hee	207	3
EGY	Mohamed Safwat	218	4
IND	Sumit Nagal	220	5
JPN	Yasutaka Uchiyama	226	6
ESP	Enrique López Pérez	229	7
IND	Prajnesh Gunneswaran	242	8

- ^{1} Rankings are as of 5 February 2018.

=== Other entrants ===
The following players received wildcards into the singles main draw:

- (India) Vijay Sundar Prashanth
- (India) Nitin Kumar Sinha
- (India) Dhakshineswar Suresh
- (India) Manish Sureshkumar

The following player received entry into the singles main draw using a protected ranking:

- (India) Saketh Myneni

The following players received entry from the qualifying draw:

- (India) Arjun Kadhe
- (India) Sidharth Rawat
- (India) Abhinav Sanjeev Shanmugam
- (Thailand) Wishaya Trongcharoenchaikul

== Champions ==
=== Singles ===
- (Australia) Jordan Thompson def. (India) Yuki Bhambri 7–5, 3–6, 7–5.

=== Doubles ===
- (India) Sriram Balaji / (India) Vishnu Vardhan def. (Turkey) Cem İlkel / (Serbia) Danilo Petrović 7–6^{(7–5)}, 5–7, [10–5].
