= 2024 Chennai Open Challenger =

- Date: 5–11 February
- Edition: 4th
- Surface: Hard
- Location: Chennai, India

Champions

Singles
- (India) Sumit Nagal

Doubles
- (India) Saketh Myneni / (India) Ramkumar Ramanathan
| ← 2023 · | Chennai Open Challenger | · 2025 → |

The 2024 Chennai Open Challenger was a professional tennis tournament played on hard courts. It was the fourth edition of the tournament which was part of the 2024 ATP Challenger Tour. It took place in Chennai, India between 5 and 11 February 2024.

== Singles main-draw entrants ==
=== Seeds ===
| Country | Player | Rank^{1} | Seed |
|---|---|---|---|
| ITA | Luca Nardi | 114 | 1 |
| IND | Sumit Nagal | 121 | 2 |
| CZE | Dalibor Svrčina | 194 | 3 |
| FRA | Ugo Blanchet | 214 | 4 |
| ITA | Stefano Napolitano | 216 | 5 |
| ESP | Oriol Roca Batalla | 217 | 6 |
| TUN | Aziz Dougaz | 219 | 7 |
| TPE | Hsu Yu-hsiou | 230 | 8 |

- ^{1} Rankings are as of 29 January 2024.

=== Other entrants ===
The following players received wildcards into the singles main draw:

- (Georgia (country)) Nikoloz Basilashvili
- (India) Ramkumar Ramanathan
- (India) Mukund Sasikumar

The following players received entry into the singles main draw as alternates:

- (Australia) Akira Santillan
- (Italy) Samuel Vincent Ruggeri
- (France) Arthur Weber

The following players received entry from the qualifying draw:

- Bogdan Bobrov
- (India) S D Prajwal Dev
- (Czech Republic) Jonáš Forejtek
- (Poland) Olaf Pieczkowski
- (Ukraine) Eric Vanshelboim
- Alexey Zakharov

== Champions ==
=== Singles ===
- (India) Sumit Nagal def. (Italy) Luca Nardi 6–1, 6–4.

=== Doubles ===
- (India) Saketh Myneni / (India) Ramkumar Ramanathan def. (India) Rithvik Choudary Bollipalli / (India) Niki Kaliyanda Poonacha 3–6, 6–3, [10–5].
