= 2019 Chennai Open Challenger =

- Date: 4–10 February
- Edition: 2nd
- Draw: 48S / 16D
- Surface: Hard
- Location: Chennai, India

Champions

Singles
- (France) Corentin Moutet

Doubles
- (Italy) Gianluca Mager / (Italy) Andrea Pellegrino
← 2018 ·	Chennai Open Challenger	· 2023 →

The 2019 Chennai Open Challenger was a professional tennis tournament played on hard courts. It was the second edition of the tournament which was part of the 2019 ATP Challenger Tour. It took place in Chennai, India between 4 and 10 February 2019.

== Singles main-draw entrants ==
=== Seeds ===
Country	Player	Rank^{1}	Seed
IND	Prajnesh Gunneswaran	102	1
FRA	Corentin Moutet	143	2
EGY	Mohamed Safwat	200	3
ITA	Gianluca Mager	224	4
ESP	Alejandro Davidovich Fokina	235	5
KOR	Kwon Soon-woo	236	6
AUS	James Duckworth	239	7
KOR	Lee Duck-hee	241	8
POR	Gastão Elias	246	9
ESP	Nicola Kuhn	248	10
IND	Saketh Myneni	260	11
AUS	Maverick Banes	265	12
DOM	José Hernández-Fernández	273	13
LTU	Laurynas Grigelis	281	14
TPE	Yang Tsung-hua	283	15
IND	Sasikumar Mukund	292	16

- ^{1} Rankings are as of 28 January 2019.

=== Other entrants ===
The following players received wildcards into the singles main draw:

- (Vietnam) Lý Hoàng Nam
- (India) Vijay Sundar Prashanth
- (India) Abhinav Sanjeev Shanmugam
- (India) Manish Sureshkumar
- (India) Siddharth Vishwakarma

The following players received entry into the singles main draw using protected rankings:

- (Germany) Daniel Altmaier
- (United States) Daniel Nguyen

The following player received entry into the singles main draw as an alternate:

- (Russia) Ivan Gakhov

The following players received entry into the singles main draw using their ITF World Tennis Ranking:

- (Tunisia) Moez Echargui
- (Russia) Ivan Nedelko
- (Spain) David Pérez Sanz
- (Russia) Evgenii Tiurnev

The following players received entry from the qualifying draw:

- (Japan) Kaito Uesugi
- (Russia) Alexander Zhurbin

== Champions ==
=== Singles ===
- (France) Corentin Moutet def. (Australia) Andrew Harris 6–3, 6–3.

=== Doubles ===
- (Italy) Gianluca Mager / (Italy) Andrea Pellegrino def. (Australia) Matt Reid / (Australia) Luke Saville 6–4, 7–6^{(9–7)}.
