= Tennis at the 2016 South Asian Games – Men's singles =

== Draw ==
First Round
1	(India) S Myneni	6	6
(Maldives) AF Fazeel	0	1
(Afghanistan) SA Sharifi	3	1
(Bangladesh) D Lal	6	6
4	(Sri Lanka) H Godamanna	6	6
(Bhutan) TS Dorji	1	1
(Nepal) A Bastola	1	4
(Pakistan) A Qureshi	6	6
(Maldives) AM Faris	7	4	6
(Afghanistan) A Kabir	5	6	4
(Bangladesh) Md. A Hossain	0	0
3	(Sri Lanka) S Dissanayake	6	6
(Pakistan) A Khan	6	6
(Bhutan) T Norbu	1	2
(Nepal) S Bajr.	1	0
2	(India) R Ramanathan	6	6

Quarterfinals
1	(India) S Myneni	6	6
(Bangladesh) D Lal	0	1
4	(Sri Lanka) H Godamanna	4	6^{1}
(Pakistan) A Qureshi	6	7^{7}
(Maldives) AM Faris	1	0
3	(Sri Lanka) S Dissanayake	6	6
(Pakistan) A Khan	3	3
2	(India) R Ramanathan	6	6

Semifinals
1	(India) S Myneni	6	6
(Pakistan) A Qureshi	2	1
3	(Sri Lanka) S Dissanayake	4	5
2	(India) R Ramanathan	6	7

Final
1	(India) S Myneni	5	2
2	(India) R Ramanathan	7	6
