= 2026 Chennai Open Challenger =

- Date: 9–15 February
- Edition: 6th
- Surface: Hard
- Location: Chennai, India

Champions

Singles
- (Portugal) Frederico Ferreira Silva

Doubles
- (Thailand) Pruchya Isaro / (India) Niki Kaliyanda Poonacha
- Chennai Open Challenger

The 2026 Coromandel Chennai Open was a professional tennis tournament played on hard courts. It was the sixth edition of the tournament which was part of the 2026 ATP Challenger Tour. It took place in Chennai, India between 9 and 15 February 2026.

== Singles main-draw entrants ==
=== Seeds ===
Country	Player	Rank^{1}	Seed
GBR	Jay Clarke	186	1
ARG	Federico Agustín Gómez	197	2
GBR	Oliver Crawford	213	3
	Ilia Simakin	214	4
JPN	Rio Noguchi	241	5
POR	Frederico Ferreira Silva	258	6
FRA	Florent Bax	272	7
IND	Sumit Nagal	281	8

- ^{1} Rankings are as of 2 February 2026.

=== Other entrants ===
The following players received wildcards into the singles main draw:

- (India) Sidharth Rawat
- (India) Digvijaypratap Singh
- (India) Manish Sureshkumar

The following players received entry from the qualifying draw:

- (India) S D Prajwal Dev
- (India) Ishaque Eqbal
- (India) Aryan Lakshmanan
- (Malaysia) Mitsuki Wei Kang Leong
- (India) Nitin Kumar Sinha
- (India) Aditya Vishal Balsekar

== Champions ==
=== Singles ===
- (Portugal) Frederico Ferreira Silva def. (Argentina) Federico Agustín Gómez 6–4, 6–7^{(10–12)}, 6–4.

=== Doubles ===
- (Thailand) Pruchya Isaro / (India) Niki Kaliyanda Poonacha def. (United Kingdom) Jay Clarke / (India) Mukund Sasikumar 6–4, 6–4.
