= 2024 Seoul Open Challenger =

- Date: 28 October – 3 November
- Edition: 8th
- Surface: Hard
- Location: Seoul, South Korea

Champions

Singles
- (Georgia (country)) Nikoloz Basilashvili

Doubles
- (India) Saketh Myneni / (India) Ramkumar Ramanathan
- Seoul Open Challenger

The 2024 Sisley Seoul Open Challenger was a professional tennis tournament played on outdoor hard courts. It was the eighth edition of the tournament. It was part of the 2024 ATP Challenger Tour. It took place in Seoul, South Korea, between 28 October and 3 November 2024.

== Singles main draw entrants ==
=== Seeds ===
Country	Player	Rank^{1}	Seed
JPN	Taro Daniel	89	1
USA	Mackenzie McDonald	120	2
USA	Nicolas Moreno de Alboran	121	3
TPE	Tseng Chun-hsin	125	4
~~KOR~~	~~Hong Seong-chan~~	~~142~~	~~5~~
HKG	Coleman Wong	145	6
FRA	Térence Atmane	152	7
JPN	Sho Shimabukuro	178	8

- ^{1} Rankings as of 21 October 2024.

=== Other entrants ===
The following players received wildcards into the singles main draw:

- (South Korea) Chung Hyeon
- (South Korea) Chung Yun-seong
- (South Korea) Shin San-hui

The following players received entry from the qualifying draw:

- (Japan) Hiroki Moriya
- (Italy) Julian Ocleppo
- (Thailand) Kasidit Samrej
- (Japan) Kaichi Uchida
- (Japan) Kaito Uesugi
- (China) Zhou Yi

The following player received entry as a lucky loser:

- (China) Cui Jie

== Champions ==
=== Singles ===
- (Georgia (country)) Nikoloz Basilashvili def. (Japan) Taro Daniel 7–5, 6–4.

=== Doubles ===
- (India) Saketh Myneni / (India) Ramkumar Ramanathan def. (United States) Vasil Kirkov / (Netherlands) Bart Stevens 6–4, 4–6, [10–3].
