= 2025 Chennai Open Challenger =

- Date: 3–9 February
- Edition: 5th
- Surface: Hard
- Location: Chennai, India

Champions

Singles
- (France) Kyrian Jacquet

Doubles
- (Japan) Shintaro Mochizuki / (Japan) Kaito Uesugi
- Chennai Open Challenger

The 2025 Chennai Open was a professional tennis tournament played on hard courts. It was the fifth edition of the tournament which was part of the 2025 ATP Challenger Tour. It took place in Chennai, India between 3 and 9 February 2025.

== Singles main-draw entrants ==
=== Seeds ===
Country	Player	Rank^{1}	Seed
GBR	Billy Harris	129	1
RSA	Lloyd Harris	142	2
CRO	Duje Ajduković	158	3
CAN	Alexis Galarneau	176	4
JPN	Shintaro Mochizuki	180	5
JPN	Sho Shimabukuro	191	6
KAZ	Timofey Skatov	200	7
HUN	Zsombor Piros	213	8

- ^{1} Rankings are as of 27 January 2025.

=== Other entrants ===
The following players received wildcards into the singles main draw:

- (India) Ramkumar Ramanathan
- (India) Mukund Sasikumar
- (India) Karan Singh

The following players received entry from the qualifying draw:

- Egor Agafonov
- (Czech Republic) Hynek Bartoň
- (Belgium) Kimmer Coppejans
- (Ukraine) Yurii Dzhavakian
- (Ukraine) Eric Vanshelboim
- Maxim Zhukov

The following player received entry as a lucky loser:

- (France) Sascha Gueymard Wayenburg

== Champions ==
=== Singles ===
- (France) Kyrian Jacquet def. (Sweden) Elias Ymer 7–6^{(7–1)}, 6–4.

=== Doubles ===
- (Japan) Shintaro Mochizuki / (Japan) Kaito Uesugi def. (India) Saketh Myneni / (India) Ramkumar Ramanathan 6–4, 6–4.
