= Pruchya Isaro =

Thai tennis player (born 1995)

- Country (sports): Thailand
- Born: 16 October 1995 (age 31) Songkhla, Thailand
- Height: 1.75 m (5 ft 9 in)
- Plays: Right-handed (Double Handed Both Sides)
- Coach: Soonton Isarow
- Prize money: US $146,152

Singles
- Career record: 8–5
- Career titles: 0
- Highest ranking: No. 545 (24 December 2018)

Doubles
- Career record: 4–7
- Career titles: 6 Challenger, 15 ITF
- Highest ranking: No. 93 (27 July 2026)
- Current ranking: No. 93 (27 July 2026)

Grand Slam doubles results
- Australian Open: 1R (2026)
Medal record
Tennis
Representing Thailand
Asian Games
Bronze medal – third place	2022 Hangzhou	Doubles
Southeast Asian Games
Gold medal – first place	2021 Vietnam	Team
Gold medal – first place	2023 Cambodia	Team
Gold medal – first place	2025 Thailand	Doubles
Gold medal – first place	2025 Thailand	Mixed doubles
Silver medal – second place	2021 Vietnam	Mixed doubles
Silver medal – second place	2023 Cambodia	Mixed doubles
Silver medal – second place	2025 Thailand	Team
- Last updated on: 27 July 2026.

Pruchya Isaro (Thai: ปรัชญา อิสโร; born 16 October 1995) is a professional tennis player from Thailand, specializing in doubles. He has a career-high ATP doubles ranking of world No. 93 achieved on 27 July 2026 and a singles ranking of No. 545 achieved on 24 December 2018. Isaro plays mainly on the ATP Challenger Tour where he has won 6 doubles titles.

== Career ==
He competed for the Thailand Davis Cup team between 2013 and 2016 with a win–loss record of 12–6.

== ATP Challenger Tour titles ==
Legend
Challengers (6)

=== Doubles ===
Outcome	No.	Date	Tournament	Surface	Partner	Opponents	Score
Winner	1.	31 August 2014	Bangkok	Hard	(Thailand) Nuttanon Kadchapanan	(Chinese Taipei) Chen Ti (Chinese Taipei) Peng Hsien-yin	6–4, 6–4
Winner	2.	19 October 2024	Shenzhen	Hard	(China) Aoran Wang	(Chinese Taipei) Ray Ho (United Kingdom) Joshua Paris	7–6^{(7–4)}, 6–3
Winner	3.	7 September 2025	Shanghai	Hard	(India) Niki Kaliyanda Poonacha	(Chinese Taipei) Jason Jung (United States) Reese Stalder	6–4, 6–7^{(2–7)}, [10–8]
Winner	4.	15 February 2026	Chennai	Hard	(India) Niki Kaliyanda Poonacha	(United Kingdom) Jay Clarke (India) Mukund Sasikumar	6–4, 6–4
Winner	5.	4 April 2026	Menorca	Clay	(India) Niki Kaliyanda Poonacha	(India) Siddhant Banthia (Bulgaria) Alexander Donski	6–3, 7–6^{(7–3)}
Winner	6.	13 June 2026	Lyon	Clay	(India) Niki Kaliyanda Poonacha	(Tunisia) Skander Mansouri (Austria) Maximilian Neuchrist	6–0, 6–1
