= Ramkumar Ramanathan =

Indian tennis player

Ramanathan Ramkumar
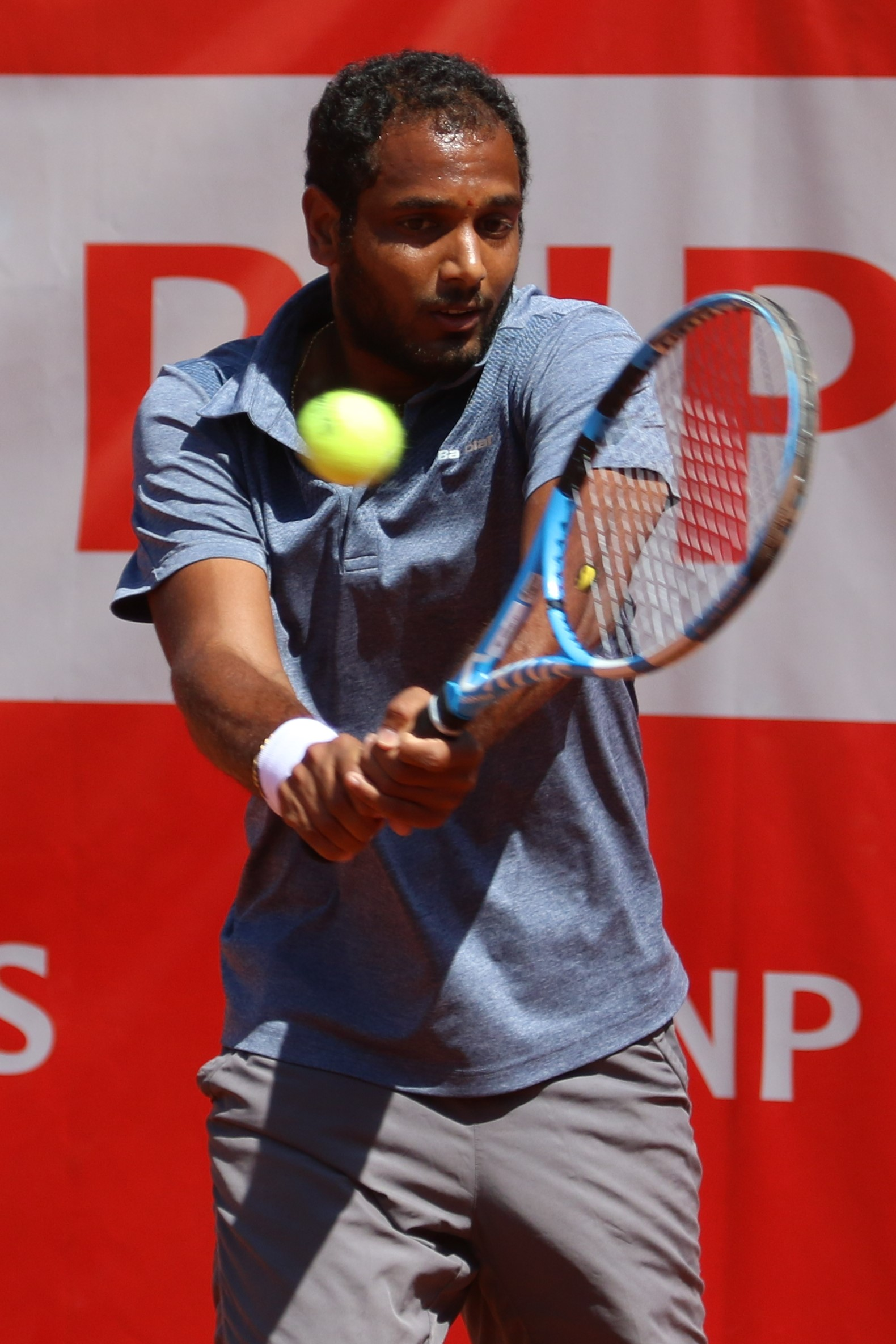
- Ramanathan at the 2022 BNP Paribas Primrose Bordeaux
- Country (sports): India
- Residence: Barcelona, Spain & Chennai, India
- Born: 8 November 1994 (age 31) Karaikudi, Tamil Nadu, India
- Height: 1.88 m (6 ft 2 in)
- Turned pro: 2009
- Plays: Right-handed (two-handed backhand)
- Coach: Juan Balcells & Sergio Casal
- Prize money: $1,363,386

Singles
- Career record: 26–38
- Career titles: 0
- Highest ranking: No. 111 (30 July 2018)
- Current ranking: No. 1,356 (13 July 2026)

Grand Slam singles results
- Australian Open: Q3 (2018)
- French Open: Q2 (2015, 2021, 2022)
- Wimbledon: Q3 (2021)
- US Open: Q2 (2015, 2017)

Doubles
- Career record: 18–27
- Career titles: 2
- Highest ranking: No. 58 (15 August 2022)
- Current ranking: No. 173 (13 July 2026)

Grand Slam doubles results
- Australian Open: 1R (2023)
- French Open: 2R (2022)
- Wimbledon: 1R (2022)
- US Open: 1R (2022)

Grand Slam mixed doubles results
- French Open: 1R (2022)
- Wimbledon: 1R (2021)

Team competitions
- Davis Cup: 8–7 (singles 8–7)
Medal record
tennis
Representing India
Asian Games
Silver medal – second place	2022 Hangzhou	Doubles
South Asian Games
Gold medal – first place	2016 Guwahati	Singles
Gold medal – first place	2016 Guwahati	Doubles
- Last updated on: 15 July 2026.

Ramanathan Ramkumar (born 8 November 1994) is an Indian professional tennis player. He has been ranked as high as world No. 111 in singles by the ATP, which he achieved in July 2018, and in doubles at No. 58, achieved in August 2022. He has represented India in the Davis Cup.

== Personal and early life ==
Ramkumar was born to Ramanathan Chettiar and Alagammai Aachi in a Nattukottai Nagarathar family in Karaikudi, Tamil Nadu. Both his parents are in the textile business. He has a sister named Uma. He started playing tennis at the age of five, introduced to the sport by his father. He trains at the Sanchez-Casal Academy in Barcelona, Spain. He graduated with a B.A. in economics from Loyola College, Chennai. He speaks Tamil, English and Spanish.

== Career ==
=== 2008–2010: Junior career and turning pro ===
Ramanathan began playing tennis at the age of five, turning professional in 2009.

=== 2014–2016: Early career ===
In 2014, Ramanathan qualified for the main draw of the Chennai Open and beat the then-Indian No. 1 Somdev Devvarman in the first round. He then lost to Marcel Granollers in the second round.

In 2015, Ramanathan played mostly on Futures and Challenger level. He entered the Chennai Open, where he lost in first round to Tatsuma Ito in straight sets. In April, he reached his first doubles final at a challenger event at the Mersin Cup in Turkey. Partnering with Riccardo Ghedin, the pair lost the final to Mate Pavić and Michael Venus. He entered his second ATP world tour event of the year at Malaysian Open where he lost in the first round to Mikhail Kukushkin.

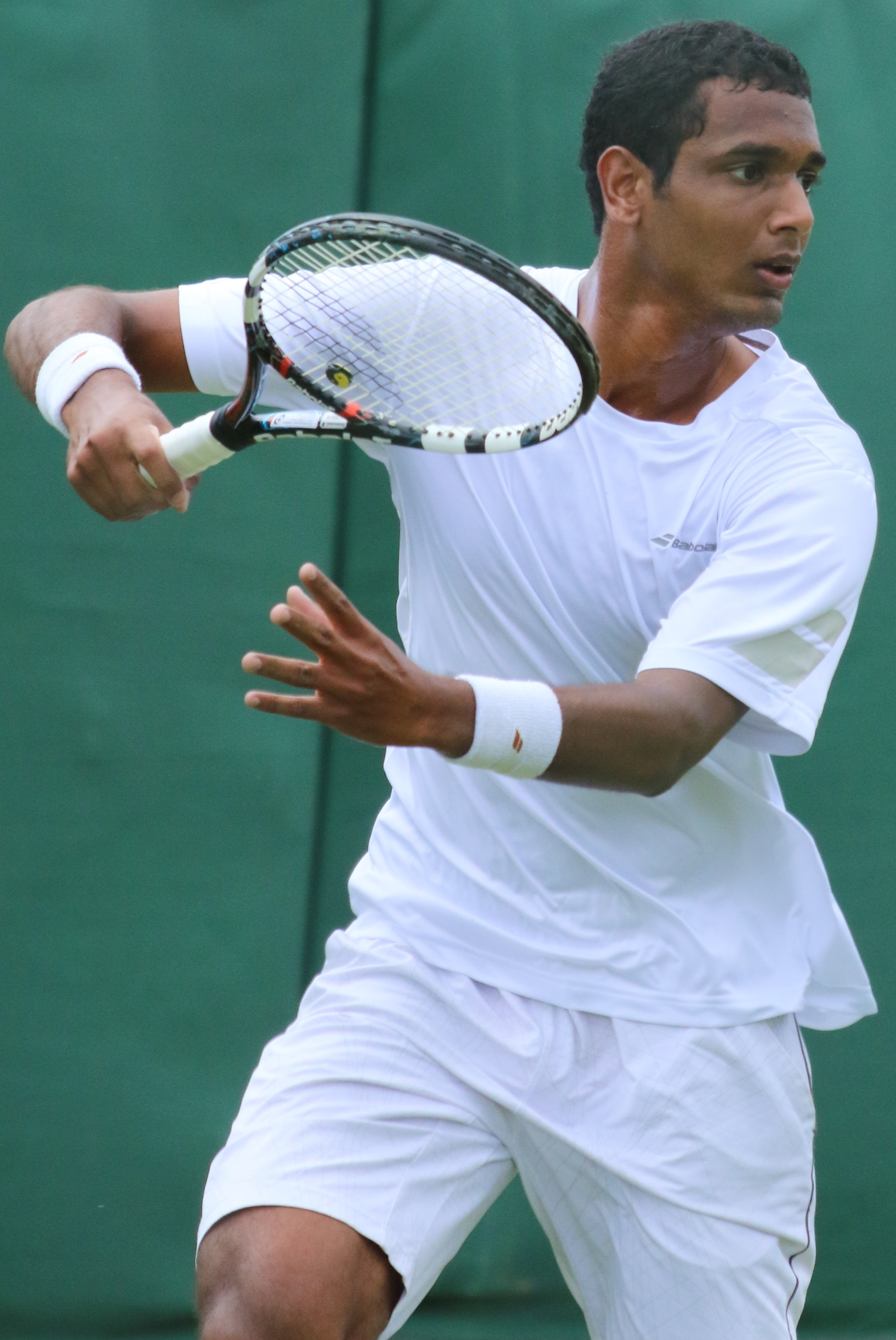
Ramanathan at the 2016 Wimbledon qualifying

In the 2016 season, Ramanathan entered the Chennai Open and reached the quarterfinals, his best result at an ATP World Tour event. He defeated Daniel Gimeno Traver and Alexander Kudryavtsev in the first and second rounds respectively. He lost to Aljaž Bedene in the quarterfinals. In October, Ramanathan partnered with Jeevan Nedunchezhiyan. The pair reached the final at the Vietnam Open Challenger, where they lost to Sanchai Ratiwatana and Sonchat Ratiwatana.

=== 2017: Challenger breakthrough, Masters debut and first win ===
In April, Ramanathan reached his first singles challenger final at the Tallahassee challenger. He lost to Blaž Rola.

Ramanathan entered the 2017 Antalya Open, where he upset world No. 8 and top seed Dominic Thiem in the second round. This was his first match win against a top-10 player. Ranked world No. 222, Ramanathan defeated Thiem in straight sets, 6–3, 6–2. He progressed to the quarterfinals, where he lost to Marcos Baghdatis.

In July, he reached his second singles Challenger final at Nielsen Pro Tennis Championships. He lost in straight sets to Akira Santillan.

In August, Ramanathan entered for the first time in a main draw of a Masters 1000 tournament at the Cincinnati Masters as a lucky loser. He defeated qualifier Christopher Eubanks in the first round, before losing to another American, Jared Donaldson. Ramanathan entered qualifying draw of US Open. He defeated Paul-Henri Mathieu in the first round but lost to Nicolas Mahut in the second. He finished year with a singles ranking of No. 148.

=== 2018: Hall of Fame Tennis Championships finalist ===
Ramanathan opened his new season by entering Maharashtra Open as a wildcard. He lost in round two to top seed Marin Cilic in straight sets. He then entered qualifying draw of Australian Open where he lost in the final qualifying round to Vasek Pospisil.

In April, Ramanathan reached his first Challenger singles final of the season at Taipei Challenger. He was defeated in the final by compatriot Yuki Bhambri.

In July, Ramanathan reached the final at Newport where he lost to Steve Johnson. He became the first Indian to reach an ATP World Tour singles final since Somdev Devvarman at the 2011 Johannesburg Open.

In November, he won his first doubles ATP Challenger title at Pune Challenger. He paired with compatriot Vijay Sundar Prashanth and defeated Hsieh Cheng-peng and Yang Tsung-hua in the final. He finished the year with a singles ranking of No. 133.

=== 2019–2020: One singles final & four doubles Challenger titles ===
Ramanthan won the doubles titles in Japan, France, Italy, and two in India.

=== 2021: Major debut in mixed doubles, maiden singles Challenger title ===
Ramanathan entered men's singles qualifying draw of Wimbledon. He defeated Jozef Kovalík and Tomás Martín Etcheverry in the first and second rounds respectively in straight sets but lost to Marc Polmans in last qualifying round in a five sets thriller in the tiebreaker. He made his Grand Slam main draw debut in mixed doubles where he entered the draw after a last minute withdrawal partnering Ankita Raina. This was a Grand Slam mixed doubles debut for both players. They lost to compatriots Rohan Bopanna and Sania Mirza in straight sets. It was a historic first ever all Indian match at a Grand Slam level.

He won his first singles Challenger title at Manama Challenger where he defeated Evgeny Karlovskiy in straight sets. Ramanathan ended 2021 year by reaching the quarterfinals of the 2021 Antalya Challenger III in singles and the semifinals of doubles with Vladyslav Orlov.

=== 2022–2024: ATP title & top 100, Masters singles main draw ===
Ramkumar had good start to 2022 season with a title win in Adelaide, Ramanathan partnered with Rohan Bopanna and won the title by defeating top seeds Ivan Dodig and Marcelo Melo in the final. This was his first ATP Tour title. Just a month later, he won his second ATP title with Rohan Bopanna at Maharashtra Open by defeating Australian pair of Luke Saville and John-Patrick Smith in the final. Following his title victory he broke into ATP Top 100 doubles rankings by reaching career best ranking of World No. 94. At the same tournament, Ramanathan received a singles main draw wildcard but lost to Stefano Travaglia in the first round in three sets. In singles, he lost to Holger Rune in the 2022 Adelaide qualifiers and Gian Marco Moroni in Australian Open qualifiers in straight sets respectively.

Ramanathan lost in the first round of 2022 Bengaluru Open to Max Purcell in three sets but went on to win the doubles title with Saketh Myneni, defeating French pair of Hugo Grenier and Alexandre Müller in straight sets in the final. The pair did not drop a single set in winning the title. He then lost to Mathias Bourgue at Bengaluru Open 2 but reached the doubles final with Saketh Myneni again losing to Arjun Kadhe and Alexander Erler in the tie breaker. Ramanathan and Saketh lost in the 1st round of 2022 Dubai Tennis Championships to John Peers and Filip Polášek in straight sets after receiving a wildcard.

Ramanathan lost to Liam Broady in the qualifying round of 2022 Indian Wells Masters. Ramanathan was the top seed in the singles qualifying round of 2022 Challenger di Roseto degli Abruzzi II but lost to Francesco Maestrelli. He reached the quarterfinals of the doubles event with Jeevan Nedunchezhiyan. He then reached the final of the Challenger Biel/Bienne with Purav Raja where they lost to top seeds Pierre-Hugues Herbert and Albano Olivetti in straight sets. He then lost to JC Aragone in the first round of the Salinas Challenger. At the same tournament, in doubles as the top seeds with Jeevan, he lost to eventual champions and compatriots Yuki Bhambri and Saketh Myneni.

At the 2024 Rolex Shanghai Masters he qualified for the main draw with wins over Ugo Blanchet and Fajing Sun. It was his first singles main draw appearance at the Masters level since 2017 Cincinnati, having entered the qualifying competition as an alternate.

== ATP career finals ==
=== Singles: 1 (runner-up) ===
Legend Grand Slam tournaments ATP World Tour Masters 1000 ATP World Tour 500 Series ATP World Tour 250 Series (0–1)	Finals by surface Hard (0–0) Grass (0–1)	Finals by setting Outdoor (1–0) Indoor (0–0)

Result	W–L	Date	Tournament	Tier	Surface	Opponent	Score
Loss	0–1	Jul 2018	Hall of Fame Tennis Championships, United States	250 Series	Grass	(United States) Steve Johnson	5–7, 6–3, 2–6

=== Doubles: 2 (2 titles) ===
Legend Grand Slam tournaments ATP World Tour Masters 1000 ATP World Tour 500 Series ATP World Tour 250 Series (2–0)	Finals by surface Hard (2–0) Grass (0–0)	Finals by setting Outdoor (2–0) Indoor (0–0)

Result	W–L	Date	Tournament	Tier	Surface	Partner	Opponents	Score
Win	1–0	Jan 2022	Adelaide International, Australia	250 Series	Hard	(India) Rohan Bopanna	(Croatia) Ivan Dodig (Brazil) Marcelo Melo	7–6^{(8–6)}, 6–1
Win	2–0	Jan 2022	Maharashtra Open, India	250 Series	Hard	(India) Rohan Bopanna	(Australia) Luke Saville (Australia) John-Patrick Smith	6–7^{(10–12)}, 6–3, [10–6]

== ATP Challenger and ITF Tour finals ==
=== Singles: 34 (21–13) ===
Legend ATP Challenger Tour (1–6) ITF Futures Tour (20–7)	Finals by surface Hard (19–9) Clay (2–3) Carpet (0–1)

Result	W–L	Date	Tournament	Tier	Surface	Opponent	Score
Loss	0–1	Dec 2012	India F16, Dharwad	Futures	Hard	(India) Sanam Singh	2–6, 6–7^{(4–7)}
Loss	0–2	Jun 2013	Spain F17, Martos	Futures	Hard	(Canada) Steven Diez	5–7, 7–6^{(7–4)}, 4–6
Win	1–2	Nov 2013	India F11, Raipur	Futures	Hard	(South Korea) Lee Duck-hee	3–6, 7–6^{(8–6)}, 6–4
Win	2–2	Dec 2013	Cambodia F2, Phnom Penh	Futures	Hard	(United Kingdom) Josh Goodall	6–1, 4–6, 6–4
Win	3–2	May 2014	Turkey F14, Antalya	Futures	Hard	(Russia) Anton Zaitcev	6–7^{(6–8)}, 6–0, 6–2
Win	4–2	Jul 2014	Spain F17, Getxo	Futures	Clay	(Spain) Marc Giner	6–4, 6–1
Loss	4–3	Jul 2014	Spain F18, Gandia	Futures	Clay	(Belgium) Arthur De Greef	4–6, 6–4, 3–6
Win	5–3	Sep 2014	Turkey F32, Antalya	Futures	Hard	(France) Rémi Boutillier	6–4, 7–6^{(10–8)}
Win	6–3	Sep 2014	Turkey F33, Antalya	Futures	Hard	(Venezuela) Ricardo Rodríguez	6–3, 6–0
Win	7–3	Nov 2014	India F7, Raipur	Futures	Hard	(India) Saketh Myneni	6–1, 6–2
Loss	7–4	Dec 2014	Qatar F5, Doha	Futures	Hard	(Georgia (country)) Nikoloz Basilashvili	6–7^{(5–7)}, 2–6
Loss	7–5	Mar 2015	India F3, Tiruchirapalli	Futures	Clay	(India) Vijay Sundar Prashanth	3–6, 4–6
Win	8–5	May 2015	India F6, Mysore	Futures	Hard	(India) Vishnu Vardhan	7–6^{(7–2)}, 3–6, 6–3
Win	9–5	Sep 2015	India F13, Coimbatore	Futures	Hard	(China) Ouyang Bowen	6–4, 6–2
Loss	9–6	Oct 2015	Turkey F40, Antalya	Futures	Hard	(Netherlands) Tim van Rijthoven	3–6, 6–4, 4–6
Win	10–6	Nov 2015	India F16, Gwalior	Futures	Hard	(India) Prajnesh Gunneswaran	6–3, 6–4
Win	11–6	Dec 2015	India F19, Mumbai	Futures	Hard	(India) Prajnesh Gunneswaran	6–3, 6–3
Win	12–6	May 2016	Spain F12, Lleida	Futures	Clay	(Canada) Félix Auger-Aliassime	7–6^{(7–1)}, 6–2
Win	13–6	Dec 2016	Qatar F5, Doha	Futures	Hard	(Austria) Sebastian Ofner	7–5, 6–3
Win	14–6	Dec 2016	Qatar F6, Doha	Futures	Hard	(Austria) Sebastian Ofner	7–5, 6–3
Loss	14–7	Apr 2017	Tallahassee, USA	Challenger	Clay	(Slovenia) Blaž Rola	2–6, 7–6^{(8–6)}, 5–7
Win	15–7	Jun 2017	Singapore F2, Singapore	Futures	Hard	(United States) Raymond Sarmiento	6–2, 6–2
Win	16–7	Jun 2017	Singapore F3, Singapore	Futures	Hard	(United States) Nicholas S. Hu	7–6^{(7–4)}, 6–2
Loss	16–8	Jul 2017	Winnetka, USA	Challenger	Hard	(Australia) Akira Santillan	6–7^{(1–7)}, 2–6
Loss	16–9	Nov 2017	Pune, India	Challenger	Hard	(India) Yuki Bhambri	6–4, 3–6, 4–6
Loss	16–10	Apr 2018	Taipei, Taiwan	Challenger	Hard (i)	(India) Yuki Bhambri	3–6, 4–6
Loss	16–11	Nov 2020	Eckental, Germany	Challenger	Carpet (i)	(United States) Sebastian Korda	4–6, 4–6
Loss	16–12	Jul 2021	Cary, USA	Challenger	Hard	(United States) Mitchell Krueger	6–7^{(4–7)}, 2–6
Win	17–12	Nov 2021	Manama, Bahrain	Challenger	Hard	(Russia) Evgeny Karlovskiy	6–1, 6–4
Win	18–12	Oct 2023	M25 Dharwad, India	World Tour	Hard	(India) Digvijay Pratap Singh	7–6^{(7–5)}, 7–6^{(8–6)}
Win	19–12	Nov 2023	M25 Mumbai, India	World Tour	Hard	(India) Siddharth Vishwakarma	6–0, 6–4
Win	20–12	Nov 2023	M25 Kalaburagi, India	World Tour	Hard	(Austria) David Pichler	6–2, 6–1
Win	21–12	Mar 2024	M25 New Delhi, India	World Tour	Hard	(India) Karan Singh	6–2, 6–2
Loss	21–13	Mar 2024	M15 Chandigarh, India	World Tour	Hard	(Uzbekistan) Khumoyun Sultanov	4–6, 2–6

=== Doubles: 58 (31–27) ===
Legend (doubles) ATP Challenger Tour (13–14) ITF Futures Tour (18–13)	Finals by surface Hard (22–17) Clay (9–8) Grass (0–2)

Result	W–L	Date	Tournament	Tier	Surface	Partner	Opponents	Score
Win	1–0	Aug 2011	Spain F29, Vigo	Futures	Clay	(Spain) Rafael Mazón-Hernández	(Japan) Taro Daniel (Japan) Hiroyasu Ehara	6–3, 6–2
Win	2–0	Jul 2012	Turkey F28, İzmir	Futures	Clay	(Russia) Kirill Dmitriev	(France) Julien Demois (France) Yanais Laurent	6–2, 6–2
Win	3–0	Jun 2013	Spain F17, Martos	Futures	Hard	(India) Ashwin Vijayragavan	(Spain) Roberto Ortega Olmedo (Spain) Ricardo Villacorta-Alonso	6–3, 5–7, [11–9]
Loss	3–1	Sep 2013	Spain F32, Sevilla	Futures	Clay	(Netherlands) Matwé Middelkoop	(Spain) Eduard Esteve Lobato (Spain) Oriol Roca Batalla	2–6, 3–6
Win	4–1	Oct 2013	Spain F33, Sabadell	Futures	Clay	(Spain) David Pérez Sanz	(Spain) Eduard Esteve Lobato (Spain) Oriol Roca Batalla	6–7^{(4)}, 6–3, [10–8]
Loss	4–2	Oct 2013	Spain F36, El Prat de Llobregat	Futures	Clay	(Spain) David Pérez Sanz	(Italy) Antonio Campo (Italy) Omar Giacalone	6–3, 4–6, [6–10]
Loss	4–3	Nov 2013	India F9, Delhi	Futures	Hard	(India) Ashwin Vijayragavan	(India) Sriram Balaji (India) Ranjeet Virali-Murugesan	6–7^{(3)}, 3–6
Loss	4–4	Nov 2013	India F11, Raipur	Futures	Hard	(India) Mohit Mayur Jayaprakash	(India) Sriram Balaji (India) Ranjeet Virali-Murugesan	1–6, 3–6
Win	5–4	Dec 2013	Cambodia F3, Phnom Penh	Futures	Hard	(India) Karunuday Singh	(Japan) Takuto Niki (Japan) Arata Onozawa	6–4, 6–3
Win	6–4	Mar 2014	India F4, Trichy	Futures	Clay	(India) Arun-Prakash Rajagopalan	(Italy) Giorgio Portaluri (Sweden) Lucas Renard	6–3, 4–6, [10–6]
Loss	6–5	May 2014	Turkey F14, Antalya	Futures	Hard	(Moldova) Andrei Ciumac	(Japan) Sho Katayama (Japan) Bumpei Sato	3–6, 1–6
Loss	6–6	May 2014	Turkey F16, Antalya	Futures	Hard	(France) Hugo Grenier	(Bulgaria) Dimitar Kuzmanov (Venezuela) Ricardo Rodríguez	w/o
Win	7–6	Jun 2014	Spain F15, Palma del Río	Futures	Hard	(Spain) Jaume Pla Malfeito	(Spain) Eduard Esteve Lobato (Spain) Oriol Roca Batalla	7–6^{(2)}, 4–6, [10–7]
Win	8–6	Jul 2014	Spain F17, Getxo	Futures	Clay	(Spain) David Pérez Sanz	(Portugal) João Domingues (Spain) José Antón Salazar Martín	5–7, 6–3, [10–4]
Loss	8–7	Jul 2014	Spain F18, Gandia	Futures	Clay	(Mexico) Miguel Ángel Reyes-Varela	(Spain) Juan-Samuel Arauzo-Martínez (Canada) Martin Beran	6–2, 6–7^{(3)}, [9–11]
Loss	8–8	Sep 2014	Turkey F33, Antalya	Futures	Hard	(Venezuela) Ricardo Rodríguez	(United Kingdom) Scott Clayton (United Kingdom) Richard Gabb	5–7, 6–7^{(7)}
Win	9–8	Oct 2014	Turkey F34, Antalya	Futures	Hard	(Turkey) Tuna Altuna	(Turkey) Barış Ergüden (Czech Republic) Jan Hájek	6–4, 6–2
Win	10–8	Dec 2014	Qatar F5, Doha	Futures	Hard	(India) Sriram Balaji	(Republic of Ireland) Sam Barry (Austria) Maximilian Neuchrist	6–3, 6–4
Loss	10–9	Mar 2015	India F2, Bhimavaram	Futures	Hard	(India) Ranjeet Virali-Murugesan	(India) Sriram Balaji (India) Vishnu Vardhan	7–6^{(5)}, 3–6, [6–10]
Win	11–9	Mar 2015	India F3, Trichy	Futures	Clay	(India) Arun-Prakash Rajagopalan	(India) Anvit Bendre (India) Akash Wagh	3–6, 6–2, [10–6]
Loss	11–10	Apr 2015	Mersin Cup, Turkey	Challenger	Clay	(Italy) Riccardo Ghedin	(Croatia) Mate Pavić (New Zealand) Michael Venus	7–5, 3–6, [4–10]
Win	12–10	Oct 2015	Turkey F41, Antalya	Futures	Hard	(Turkey) Sarp Ağabigün	(Russia) Kirill Dmitriev (Switzerland) Luca Margaroli	6–4, 6–4
Loss	12–11	Nov 2015	India F16, Gwalior	Futures	Hard	(Chinese Taipei) Hung Jui-chen	(India) Sriram Balaji (India) Vishnu Vardhan	4–6, 6–7^{(5)}
Win	13–11	Dec 2015	India F19, Mumbai	Futures	Hard	(India) Kaliyanda Poonacha	(India) Anvit Bendre (India) Chandril Sood	6–4, 6–3
Win	14–11	May 2016	Spain F12, Lleida	Futures	Clay	(Spain) David Vega Hernández	(Spain) Carlos Boluda-Purkiss (Australia) Alex de Minaur	6–3, 6–1
Loss	14–12	Oct 2016	France F21, Nevers	Futures	Hard (i)	(Venezuela) Jordi Muñoz Abreu	(France) Antoine Hoang (France) Grégoire Jacq	3–6, 4–6
Loss	14–13	Oct 2016	Ho Chi Minh City, Vietnam	Challenger	Hard	(India) Jeevan Nedunchezhiyan	(Thailand) Sanchai Ratiwatana (Thailand) Sonchat Ratiwatana	5–7, 4–6
Win	15–13	Feb 2017	USA F8, Indian Harbour Beach	Futures	Clay	(Spain) Jaume Pla Malfeito	(United States) Hunter Callahan (United States) Nick Chappell	6–2, 6–7^{(5)}, [11–9]
Loss	15–14	Mar 2017	USA F9, Orlando	Futures	Clay	(Spain) Jaume Pla Malfeito	(United States) Connor Smith (United States) Rhyne Williams	4–6, 4–6
Loss	15–15	Nov 2018	Bratislava, Slovakia	Challenger	Hard (i)	(Belarus) Andrei Vasilevski	(Ukraine) Denys Molchanov (Slovakia) Igor Zelenay	2–6, 6–3, [9–11]
Win	16–15	Nov 2018	Pune, India	Challenger	Hard	(India) Vijay Sundar Prashanth	(Chinese Taipei) Hsieh Cheng-peng (Chinese Taipei) Yang Tsung-hua	7–6^{(3)}, 6–7^{(5)}, [10–7]
Loss	16–16	Jun 2019	Surbiton Trophy, UK	Challenger	Grass	(South Korea) Kwon Soon-woo	(Spain) Marcel Granollers (Japan) Ben McLachlan	6–4, 3–6, [2–10]
Win	17–16	Jul 2019	Recanati, Italy	Challenger	Hard	(Portugal) Gonçalo Oliveira	(Italy) Andrea Vavassori (Spain) David Vega Hernández	6–2, 6–4
Loss	17–17	Oct 2019	Barcelona, Spain	Challenger	Clay	(Spain) Sergio Martos Gornés	(Italy) Simone Bolelli (Spain) David Vega Hernández	4–6, 5–7
Loss	17–18	Nov 2019	Shenzhen, China	Challenger	Hard	(Russia) Mikhail Elgin	(Chinese Taipei) Hsieh Cheng-peng (Chinese Taipei) Yang Tsung-hua	2–6, 5–7
Win	18–18	Nov 2019	Kobe, Japan	Challenger	Hard (i)	(India) Purav Raja	(Sweden) André Göransson (Indonesia) Christopher Rungkat	7–6^{(6)}, 6–3
Win	19–18	Nov 2019	Pune, India	Challenger	Hard	(India) Purav Raja	(India) Arjun Kadhe (India) Saketh Myneni	7–6^{(3)}, 6–3
Win	20–18	Feb 2020	Bangalore, India	Challenger	Hard	(India) Purav Raja	(India) Leander Paes (Australia) Matthew Ebden	6–0, 6–3
Win	21–18	Sep 2021	Cassis, France	Challenger	Hard	(India) Sriram Balaji	(Mexico) Hans Hach Verdugo (Mexico) Miguel Ángel Reyes-Varela	6–4, 3–6, [10–6]
Win	22–18	Feb 2022	Bangalore, India	Challenger	Hard	(India) Saketh Myneni	(France) Hugo Grenier (France) Alexandre Müller	6–3, 6–2
Loss	22–19	Feb 2022	Bangalore II, India	Challenger	Hard	(India) Saketh Myneni	(Austria) Alexander Erler (India) Arjun Kadhe	3–6, 7–6^{(4)}, [7–10]
Loss	22–20	Mar 2022	Biel/Bienne, Switzerland	Challenger	Hard (i)	(India) Purav Raja	(France) Pierre-Hugues Herbert (France) Albano Olivetti	3–6, 4–6
Loss	22–21	June 2022	Ilkley Trophy, UK	Challenger	Grass	(Australia) John-Patrick Smith	(United Kingdom) Julian Cash (United Kingdom) Henry Patten	5–7, 4–6
Loss	22–22	Jun 2023	M25 Martos, Spain	Futures	Hard	(India) Parikshit Somani	(Portugal) Jaime Faria (Portugal) Henrique Rocha	3–6, 6–7^{(3)}
Loss	22–23	Jun 2023	Emilia-Romagna, Italy	Challenger	Clay	(Switzerland) Luca Margaroli	(France) Jonathan Eysseric (Mexico) Miguel Ángel Reyes-Varela	2–6, 3–6
Loss	22–24	Aug 2023	Mallorca, Spain	Challenger	Clay	(India) Sriram Balaji	(Israel) Daniel Cukierman (United Kingdom) Joshua Paris	4–6, 4–6
Win	23–24	Nov 2023	M25 Mumbai, India	Futures	Hard	(India) Purav Raja	(Ukraine) Vladyslav Orlov (United States) Harrison Adams	6–3, 6–3
Win	24–24	Feb 2024	Chennai Open, India	Challenger	Hard	(India) Saketh Myneni	(India) Rithvik Choudary Bollipalli (India) Niki Kaliyanda Poonacha	3–6, 6–3, [10–5]
Win	25–24	Feb 2024	Bangalore, India	Challenger	Hard	(India) Saketh Myneni	(France) Constantin Bittoun Kouzmine (France) Maxime Janvier	6–3, 6–4
Loss	25–25	Jul 2024	Porto, Portugal	Challenger	Hard	(United Kingdom) Joshua Paris	(Netherlands) Sander Arends (United Kingdom) Luke Johnson	3–6, 2–6
Win	26–25	Nov 2024	Seoul, South Korea	Challenger	Hard	(India) Saketh Myneni	(United States) Vasil Kirkov (Netherlands) Bart Stevens	6–4, 4–6, [10–3]
Loss	26–26	Feb 2025	Chennai, India	Challenger	Hard	(India) Saketh Myneni	(Japan) Shintaro Mochizuki (Japan) Kaito Uesugi	4–6, 4–6
Loss	26–27	May 2025	Tbilisi, Georgia	Challenger	Hard	(India) Siddhant Banthia	(Japan) Masamichi Imamura (Japan) Naoki Tajima	6–1, 3–6, [5–10].
Win	27−27	Aug 2025	Lexington, KY USA	Challenger	Hard	(India) Anirudh Chandrasekar	(Chinese Taipei) Hsu Yu-hsiou (Chinese Taipei) Huang Tsung-hao	6–4, 6–4
Win	28–27	Jan 2026	M25 Chennai, India	World Tennis Tour	Hard	(India) Jeevan Nedunchezhiyan	(India) S D Prajwal Dev (India) Nitin Kumar Sinha	4–6, 6–3, [10–8]
Win	29–27	Mar 2026	M25 Mumbai, India	World Tennis Tour	Hard	(India) Jeevan Nedunchezhiyan	(Sweden) Leo Borg (Ukraine) Yurii Dzhavakian	6–3, 6–4
Win	30−27	Jun 2026	Tyler, USA	Challenger	Hard	(India) Rithvik Choudary Bollipalli	(United States) Zachary Fuchs (United States) Wally Thayne	7–6^{(7–2)}, 7–6^{(7–4).}
Win	31–27	Jul 2026	Bonn, Germany	Challenger	Clay	(India) Vijay Sundar Prashanth	(United Kingdom) Scott Duncan (Sweden) Adam Heinonen	7–6^{(7–4)}, 6–3

== Singles performance timeline ==
Key
W	F	SF	QF	#R	RR	Q#	P#	DNQ	A	Z#	PO	G	S	B	NMS	NTI	P	NH

(W) winner; (F) finalist; (SF) semifinalist; (QF) quarterfinalist; (#R) rounds 4, 3, 2, 1; (RR) round-robin stage; (Q#) qualification round; (P#) preliminary round; (DNQ) did not qualify; (A) absent; (Z#) Davis/Fed Cup Zonal Group (with number indication) or (PO) play-off; (G) gold, (S) silver or (B) bronze Olympic/Paralympic medal; (NMS) not a Masters tournament; (NTI) not a Tier I tournament; (P) postponed; (NH) not held; (SR) strike rate (events won / competed); (W–L) win–loss record.
To avoid confusion and double counting, these charts are updated at the conclusion of a tournament or when the player's participation has ended.

Current through the 2024 Rolex Shanghai Masters.

Tournament	2014	2015	2016	2017	2018	2019	2020	2021	2022	2023	2024	SR	W–L	Win%
Grand Slam tournaments
Australian Open	A	Q1	Q1	A	Q3	Q2	Q1	Q2	Q1			0 / 0	0–0	–
French Open	A	Q2	Q1	Q1	Q1	Q1	Q1	Q2	Q2			0 / 0	0–0	–
Wimbledon	A	A	Q2	A	Q1	Q2	NH	Q3	Q1			0 / 0	0–0	–
US Open	A	Q2	Q1	Q2	A	Q1	A	Q1	Q1			0 / 0	0–0	–
Win–loss	0–0	0–0	0–0	0–0	0–0	0–0	0–0	0–0	0–0			0 / 0	0–0	–
Masters 1000
Indian Wells Masters	A	A	A	A	Q2	Q1	A	Q1	Q1	A	A	0 / 0	0–0	0%
Miami Open	A	A	A	A	Q1	Q1	A	A	A	A	A	0 / 0	0–0	0%
Cincinnati Masters	A	A	A	2R	A	A	A	A	A	A	A	0 / 1	1–1	50%
Shanghai Masters	A	A	A	A	Q2	A	A	A	A	A	1R	0 / 1	0–1	0%
National representation
Davis Cup	A	A	PO	Z1	PO	Z1	QR	WG1				0 / 5	10–9	53%
Win–loss	0–0	0–0	1–3	5–1	1–2	1–1	0–1	0–1	2–0	0–1	1–1	0 / 0	11–11	50%
Career statistics
Titles/Finals	0–0	0–0	0–0	0–0	0–1	0–0	0–0	0–0	0–0			0–1		
Overall win–loss	1–1	0–2	3–5	8–5	7–7	3–5	0–2	0–4	2–4	0–1	1–2	25–38		40%
Year-end ranking	241	248	227	148	132	174	190	222	438	523	308	$1,284,801		

== Wins over top-10 players ==
Season	2017	2018	2019	2020	2021	2022	Total
Wins	1	0	0	0	0	0	1

#	Player	Rank	Event	Surface	Rd	Score	RRR
2017
1.	(Austria) Dominic Thiem	8	Antalya, Turkey	Grass	2R	6–3, 6–2	221
