= Chennai Open Challenger =

Tennis tournament in Tamil Nadu, India

Chennai Open
- 2025 Chennai Open Challenger

ATP Challenger Tour
- Event name: Chennai Open
- Location: Chennai, Tamil Nadu, India
- Venue: SDAT Tennis Stadium, Nungambakkam
- Category: Challenger Tour 100 (2023-2025)
- Surface: Hard
- Draw: 32S/32Q/16D
- Prize money: US$63,000 + H

The Chennai Open is a professional tennis tournament played on hardcourts. It is currently part of the ATP Challenger Tour. It is held annually in Chennai, India, since 2018, at the SDAT Tennis Stadium.

The 2025 edition, which was a Challenger 100 category, attracted players from 14 countries and had a prize money of US$160,000.

== Past finals ==
=== Singles ===
| Year | Champion | Runner-up | Score |
|---|---|---|---|
| 2026 | (Portugal) Frederico Ferreira Silva | (Argentina) Federico Agustín Gómez | 6–4, 6–7^{(10–12)}, 6–4 |
| 2025 | (France) Kyrian Jacquet | (Sweden) Elias Ymer | 7–6^{(7–1)}, 6–4 |
| 2024 | (India) Sumit Nagal | (Italy) Luca Nardi | 6–1, 6–4 |
| 2023 | (Australia) Max Purcell | (United States) Nicolas Moreno de Alboran | 5–7, 7–6^{(7–2)}, 6–4 |
| 2020–2022 | Not held | | |
| 2019 | (France) Corentin Moutet | (Australia) Andrew Harris | 6–3, 6–3 |
| 2018 | (Australia) Jordan Thompson | (India) Yuki Bhambri | 7–5, 3–6, 7–5 |

=== Doubles ===
| Year | Champions | Runners-up | Score |
|---|---|---|---|
| 2026 | (Thailand) Pruchya Isaro (India) Niki Kaliyanda Poonacha | (United Kingdom) Jay Clarke (India) Mukund Sasikumar | 6–4, 6–4 |
| 2025 | (Japan) Shintaro Mochizuki (Japan) Kaito Uesugi | (India) Saketh Myneni (India) Ramkumar Ramanathan | 6–4, 6–4 |
| 2024 | (India) Saketh Myneni (India) Ramkumar Ramanathan | (India) Rithvik Choudary Bollipalli (India) Niki Kaliyanda Poonacha | 3–6, 6–3, [10–5] |
| 2023 | (United Kingdom) Jay Clarke (India) Arjun Kadhe | (Austria) Sebastian Ofner (Croatia) Nino Serdarušić | 6–0, 6–4 |
| 2020–2022 | Not held | | |
| 2019 | (Italy) Gianluca Mager (Italy) Andrea Pellegrino | (Australia) Matt Reid (Australia) Luke Saville | 6–4, 7–6^{(9–7)} |
| 2018 | (India) Sriram Balaji (India) Vishnu Vardhan | (Turkey) Cem İlkel (Serbia) Danilo Petrović | 7–6^{(7–5)}, 5–7, [10–5] |
