= Sumit Nagal =

Indian tennis player

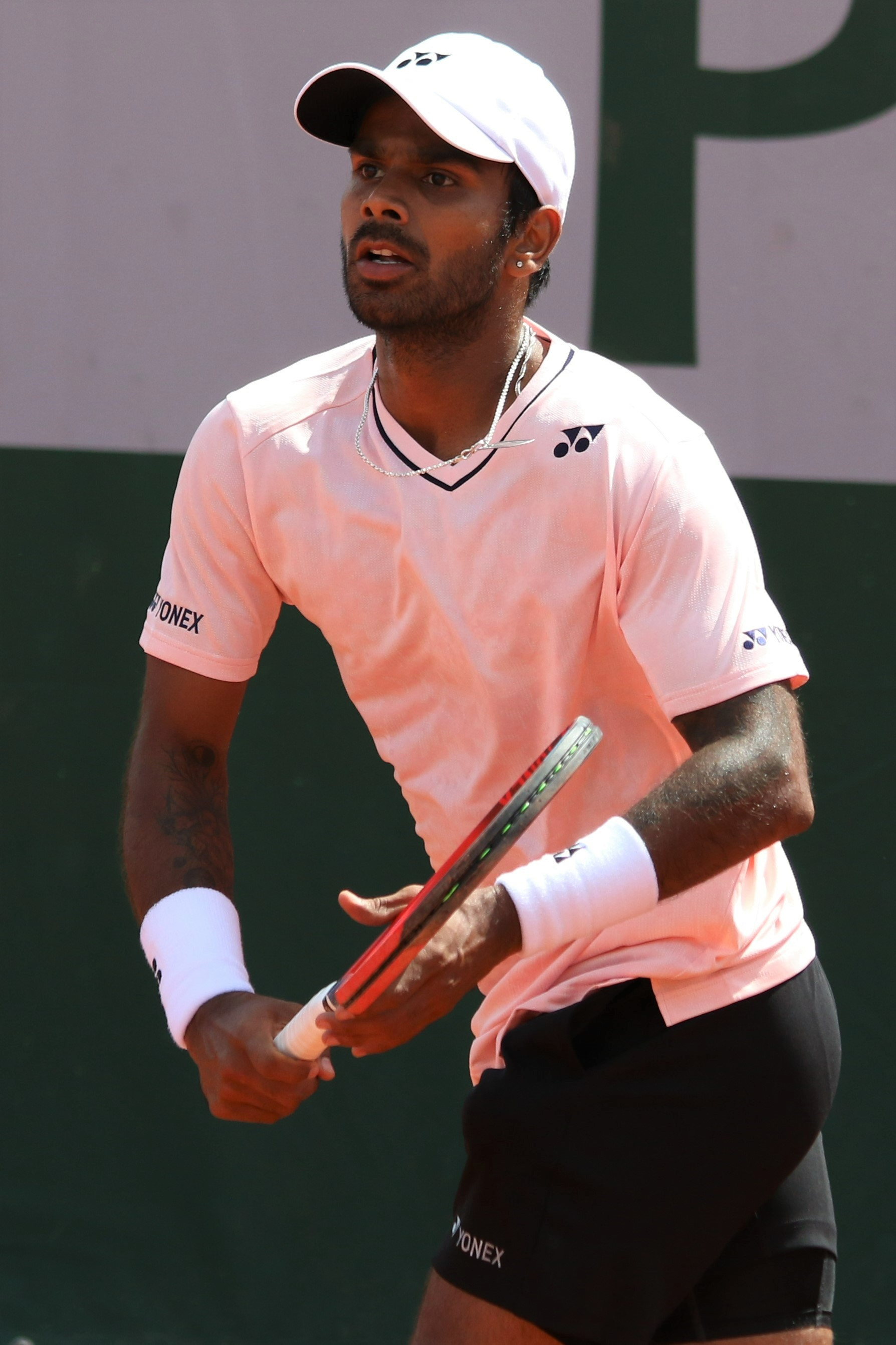
- Nagal at the 2022 French Open
- Country (sports): India
- Residence: New Delhi, India
- Born: 16 August 1997 (age 29) Jaitpur, Haryana, India
- Height: 1.78 m (5 ft 10 in)
- Turned pro: 2015
- Plays: Right-handed (two-handed backhand)
- Coach: Sascha Nensel
- Prize money: US $1,824,452

Singles
- Career record: 17–41
- Career titles: 0
- Highest ranking: No. 68 (15 July 2024)
- Current ranking: No. 249 (28 September 2026)

Grand Slam singles results
- Australian Open: 2R (2024)
- French Open: 1R (2024)
- Wimbledon: 1R (2024)
- US Open: 2R (2020)

Other tournaments
- Olympic Games: 2R (2021)

Doubles
- Career record: 0–4
- Career titles: 0
- Highest ranking: No. 416 (17 July 2023)

Grand Slam doubles results
- Wimbledon: 1R (2024)

Team competitions
- Davis Cup: 5–4
Medal record
Representing India
Men's tennis
Asian Indoor and Martial Arts Games
Gold medal – first place	2017 Ashgabat	Men's singles
- Last updated on: 31 August 2026.

Sumit Nagal (born 16 August 1997) is an Indian professional tennis player. He has a career-high singles ranking of world No. 68 achieved on 15 July 2024. Nagal is the current No. 1 Indian singles player. Since 2018, he has been a member of India's national Davis Cup squad.

He won the 2015 Wimbledon boys' doubles title with Vietnamese Lý Hoàng Nam, becoming the sixth Indian player to win a junior Grand Slam title.

== Personal life ==
Sumit Nagal was born on 16 August 1997 to school teacher Suresh Nagal and his wife Krishna Devi, a homemaker in Jhajjar, Haryana. Nagal started playing tennis at the age of eight at a local sports club.

When he was ten years old, he was selected to join Mahesh Bhupathi's training academy, as part of the first batch of Mahesh Bhupathi's Apollo Tyres Mission 2008 programme. As part of the programme, between 2008 and 2010, Nagal was based in Bengaluru. Upon the programme closing down, Nagal moved to Toronto for training with Coach Bobby Mahal until 2014.

He played for Gujarat Panthers in Tennis Premier League Season 5.

== Career ==
=== 2015: Junior Wimbledon title ===
Nagal won his first ITF Futures title by defeating Gustavo Vellbach 6–2, 6–0 at India F8 tournament. Nagal then won India F11 by defeating compatriot Ronit Singh Bisht 6–3, 6–4. Nagal won the 2015 Wimbledon boys' doubles title with his Vietnamese partner Lý Hoàng Nam, defeating Reilly Opelka and Akira Santillan in the final. He became the sixth Indian player to win a junior Grand Slam title. Nagal won his first ITF futures doubles title with Vijay Sundar Prashanth by defeating compatriots Anirudh Chandrasekar and Vignesh Peranamallur 6–3, 7–5, he also won the singles in the same tournament by defeating Vishnu Vardhan 7–6(7-5), 7–6(7-4).

=== 2016: Davis Cup debut ===
Nagal won Uzbekistan F1 with Ti Chen by defeating Sanjar Fayziev and Jurabek Karimov 5–5 ret. He won Poland F6 by defeating Daniel Masur 6–4, 1–6, 6–3. Nagal made his Davis Cup debut for India in the 2016 World Group Playoff tie against Spain in New Delhi. He then won Hungary F7 by defeating Peter Nagy 7–6(7–3), 6–1.

=== 2017: First ATP Challenger title ===
Nagal ran into a controversy when he was dropped from Davis Cup team for serious disciplinary issues.

Nagal lost the final of Romania F2 to Gonçalo Oliveira 6–3, 3–6, 0–6. He then won Sri Lanka F1 by defeating Alexandr Zhurbin 6–3, 6-2 and Sri Lanka F3 by defeating Carlos Bolunda-Purkiss 6–1, 6–1. He continued his good form by winning Italy F23 against Andrea Basso 6–4, 6–4. Nagal then defeated Colin Van Beem by 6–3, 6–0 in the final of India F7.

Nagal won gold medal at Asian Indoor and Martial Arts Games by defeating compatriot Vijay Natrajan 6–1,6-1 in the final. He didn't drop a single set in the whole championship.

At Bengaluru Challenger Nagal stunned top seed Blaž Kavčič in the quarterfinals, then followed it by beating compatriot Yuki Bhambri in the semifinal and Jay Clarke in the Finals capturing his first challenger title.

=== 2018-2019: Struggle with form, Grand Slam debut ===
In 2018, Nagal started at the Maharashtra Open where he qualified for the main draw after beating compatriot Divij Sharan and Adrián Menéndez Maceiras but in the first round he lost to Ilya Ivashka 3–6, 3–6. He lost his Davis Cup tie match to Zhang Ze 6–4, 6–1. Nagal made his Asian Games debut in 2018 edition. He competed in doubles event pairing with Ramkumar Ramanathan, where they reached the quarterfinals before losing to eventual silver medallists Alexander Bublik and Denis Yevseyev. Nagal failed to win a single match in the qualifying rounds of any Grand Slam events, he missed US Open due to an injury. He lost to compatriot Ramkumar Ramanathan in the first round of 2018 Shenzhen Longhua Open after qualifying from qualifying draw. He then lost to Saketh Myneni in the quarterfinals of 2018 Bengaluru Open 6–4, 6–4. Nagal failed to reach final of any ITF or Challenger tournament at the end of the 2018 season.

The year 2019 proved to be the breakthrough season for Nagal. At the 2019 US Open, Nagal qualified to make his Grand Slam main draw debut. He faced Roger Federer in his opening round match. He lost the match but managed to take first set against the multiple grand slam champion. Later he reached his second career ATP challenger final at the Banja Luka Challenger. He lost the championship match to Dutch player Tallon Griekspoor. The next tournament he reached the final again at Buenos Aires Challenger. He won the title defeating local player Facundo Bagnis. This was his second challenger title and his first on clay.

=== 2020: First major win ===
At 2020 US Open, Nagal won his opening round match against Bradley Klahn, thus becoming the first Indian since Somdev Devvarman at the 2013 US Open to win a singles match in the main draw of a Grand Slam. In the second round he was defeated in straight sets by the second seed and eventual champion, Dominic Thiem.

=== 2021: Olympic debut ===
Nagal started the year at the 2021 Australian Open where he received a wildcard entry into the main draw. He was defeated in straight sets to Ričardas Berankis 6–2, 7–5, 6–3. Nagal then qualified for main draw of Barcelona Open after beating Illya Marchenko and Thomas Fabbiano. But he was defeated in straight sets to Pierre-Hugues Herbert in 1st round of main draw. He lost to Norbert Gombos in the qualifiers of BMW Open. He was seeded no.8 at the Prague Open, he defeated Zdeněk Kolář and Sergiy Stakhovsky but again lost to Norbert Gombos who was the top seed.

Nagal qualified for the Tokyo Olympics in singles. He reached the 2nd round after defeating Denis Istomin. He lost to Daniil Medvedev in the next round. Nagal holds the distinction of being the first Indian in 25 years to reach the second round of an Olympics singles tennis event. At 2021 US Open, Nagal was out in the qualifying round. Nagal had an early end to 2021 season due to a hip injury for which he underwent a surgery in November. But before he was injured he lastly played at Sibiu Challenger where he made it to the semi-finals before losing to top seed and eventual champion Stefano Travaglia.

=== 2022: Injuries ===
Nagal reached the only quarterfinal of his year in the Meerbusch. Outside of that, he only won 4 matches at Challenger level.

=== 2023: Top 150, first top 100 win ===
Nagal began the season at Maharastra Open entering the main draw as wildcard. He lost to sixth seed Filip Krajinović in three sets in first round. He next lost to Shintaro Mochizuki in three sets in first qualifying round of the Nonthaburi Challenger. He then lost to Gauthier Onclin in three sets in first qualifying round of the 2023 BW Open ending the first month of the year winless.

In February, Nagal reached his first challenger semifinal since Sibiu 2021 in Chennai after coming through qualifying, beating Calum Puttergill and Nam Ji-sung. In the main draw, he beat 4th seed Ryan Peniston, lucky loser Jason Jung, and unseeded Jay Clarke, before losing to Nicolas Moreno de Alboran in the semifinals.

Nagal qualified for the Garden Open in Rome. Once he reached the main draw, he beat 4th seed Francesco Maestrelli, wildcard Fausto Tabacco, alternate Max Houkes and 8th seed Joris De Loore to reach his first Challenger final in 4 years. There, he beat Jesper de Jong in straight sets to win the title, becoming the first Indian player to win a Challenger title on European clay. As a result, he reentered the top 260 on 8 May 2023.

In July, Nagal was seeded 7th in the Tampere Challenger in Finland. There, he beat Jiří Veselý, João Lucas Reis da Silva and Aziz Dougaz to reach the semifinals, where he beat Daniel Rincón to reach the second Challenger final of his year. There, he beat 4th seed Dalibor Svrčina to win his second Challenger title of the year, becoming the first Indian player to win two titles on European Clay in the same year. As a result, his ranking returned to the top 200 at 173 after the tournament.

His success continued on clay, after reaching yet another semifinal in Tulln, defeating Albert Ramos-Viñolas for his first victory over a top 100 player on his way. In the semifinals, he defeated Flavio Cobolli to reach the third final of his year. He lost to Vít Kopřiva in straight sets.

As an alternate in Helsinki, Nagal reached another challenger quarterfinal, his first on hard courts of the year, after beating Dennis Novak and Jakub Menšík. He advanced to the semifinals after second seed Emil Ruusuvuori retired midway through their match. In the semifinals, he defeated lucky loser Stefano Travaglia to reach his fourth Challenger final of the year. He lost in the final in three sets to Corentin Moutet. As a result, his ranking returned to the top 150 at No. 141 after the tournament.

=== 2024: First Australian Open win, top 100 ===
Having been denied a wildcard to the 2024 Australian Open by the AITA for not participating in the Davis Cup, he qualified making his second appearance in the main draw at this Major after three years of absence. He upset 31st seed Alexander Bublik in straight sets, and became the first Indian tennis player to defeat a seeded player in the singles main draw of a Grand Slam since Ramesh Krishnan who beat then World No. 1 and defending champion Mats Wilander at the 1989 Australian Open. Later, in the second round, he lost against wildcard Shang Juncheng.

On 12 February 2024, having been ranked 506th in the world roughly a year prior, Nagal made his top 100 debut becoming just the tenth Indian to reach the Top 100. He reached the milestone by defeating Luca Nardi in the final of the Challenger in Chennai.

He entered the main draw 2024 BNP Paribas Open as a lucky loser on his Masters debut, replacing Rafael Nadal, making him the first Indian at a Masters 1000 event since Prajnesh Gunneswaran in Miami in 2019. He lost to Milos Raonic in straight sets.

He qualified for his next Masters in Monte Carlo becoming the first Indian singles player in 42 years to make it to the main draw at this tournament. He defeated Italian Matteo Arnaldi in his opening match, becoming the first Indian male player to win a Masters 1000 match on clay. It was also his first Masters 1000 win.

He reached his career-high singles ranking of world No. 68 on 15 July 2024, having won the 2024 Heilbronner Neckarcup, and having reached the Challenger final in Perugia soon after.

=== 2025-2026: Loss of form, out of the Majors ===
Nagal maintained a ranking within the top 100 through the end of 2024, finishing the year ranked 98th in the world. Plagued by injury and loss of form throughout 2025, he fell consistently in the rankings, dropping to a low of 307th on 28 July 2025. He took a few weeks off at the start of 2026 to address a hip injury before returning to feature in India's upset victory over the Netherlands in the Davis Cup at home.

At the 2026 BMW Open he entered his first main draw of the season as a lucky loser but lost to fifth seed Francisco Cerúndolo.

On 27th June 2026, Nagal ended his title drought by winning the INTARO Open, a challenger-level tournament at Târgu Mureș, Romania.

== Performance timeline ==
Key
W	F	SF	QF	#R	RR	Q#	DNQ	A	NH

(W) winner; (F) finalist; (SF) semifinalist; (QF) quarterfinalist; (#R) rounds 4, 3, 2, 1; (RR) round-robin stage; (Q#) qualification round; (DNQ) did not qualify; (A) absent; (NH) not held; (SR) strike rate (events won / competed); (W–L) win–loss record.
To avoid confusion and double counting, these charts are updated at the conclusion of a tournament or when the player's participation has ended.

Current through the 2026 French Open.

Tournament	2018	2019	2020	2021	2022	2023	2024	2025	2026	SR	W–L	Win %
Grand Slam tournaments
Australian Open	Q1	A	Q1	1R	A	A	2R	1R	A	0 / 3	1–3	25%
French Open	Q1	A	Q1	Q2	A	A	1R	Q2	A	0 / 1	0–1	0%
Wimbledon	Q1	A	NH	A	A	A	1R	Q1	A	0 / 1	0–1	0%
US Open	A	1R	2R	Q1	Q1	Q1	1R	A	Q1	0 / 3	1–3	25%
Win–loss	0–0	0–1	1–1	0–1	0–0	0–0	1–4	0–1	0–0	0 / 8	2–8	20%
National representation
Summer Olympics	NH			A	NH		1R	NH		0 / 1	0–1	0%
ATP 1000 tournaments
Indian Wells Open	A	A	NH	A	A	A	1R	A		0 / 1	0–1	0%
Miami Open	A	A	NH	A	A	A	Q2	A		0 / 0	0–0	–
Monte-Carlo Masters	A	A	NH	Q1	A	A	2R	A		0 / 1	1–1	50%
Madrid Open	A	A	NH	A	A	A	A	A		0 / 0	0–0	–
Italian Open	A	A	A	A	A	A	A	A		0 / 0	0–0	–
Canadian Open	A	A	NH	A	A	A	A	A		0 / 0	0–0	–
Cincinnati Masters	A	A	A	A	A	A	Q1	A		0 / 0	0–0	–
Shanghai Masters	A	A	NH			Q1	1R	A		0 / 1	0–1	0%
Paris Masters	A	A	A	A	A	A	Q1	A		0 / 0	0–0	–
Win–loss	0–0	0–0	0–0	0–0	0–0	0–0	1–3	0–0	0–0	0 / 3	1–3	25%
Career statistics
Tournaments	0	2	5	7	0	1	12	3	1	total: 31		
Titles	0	0	0	0	0	0	0	0	0	total: 0		
Finals	0	0	0	0	0	0	0	0	0	total: 0		
Overall win–loss	0–2	2–2	1–5	3–7	1–0	3–2	5–16	2–3	0–3	17–41		
Win Percentage	0%	50%	17%	30%	100%	60%	24%	40%	0%	29%		
Year-end ranking	340	130	136	222	502	138	98	277		$1,787,709		

== ATP Challenger Tour finals ==
=== Singles: 11 (7 titles, 4 runner-ups) ===
Legend ATP Challenger Tour (7–4)

Result	W–L	Date	Tournament	Tier	Surface	Opponent	Score
Win	1–0	Nov 2017	Bangalore, India	Challenger	Hard	(United Kingdom) Jay Clarke	6–3, 3–6, 6–2
Loss	1–1	Sep 2019	Banja Luka, Bosnia & Herzegovina	Challenger	Clay	(Netherlands) Tallon Griekspoor	2–6, 3–6
Win	2–1	Sep 2019	Buenos Aires, Argentina	Challenger	Clay	(Argentina) Facundo Bagnis	6–4, 6–2
Win	3–1	Apr 2023	Rome, Italy	Challenger	Clay	(Netherlands) Jesper de Jong	6–3, 6–2
Win	4–1	Jul 2023	Tampere, Finland	Challenger	Clay	(Czech Republic) Dalibor Svrčina	6–4, 7–5
Loss	4–2	Sep 2023	Tulln an der Donau, Austria	Challenger	Clay	(Czech Republic) Vít Kopřiva	2–6, 4–6
Loss	4–3	Nov 2023	Helsinki, Finland	Challenger	Hard (i)	(France) Corentin Moutet	3–6, 6–3, 2–6
Win	5–3	Feb 2024	Chennai, India	Challenger	Hard	(Italy) Luca Nardi	6–1, 6–4
Win	6–3	Jun 2024	Heilbronn, Germany	Challenger	Clay	(Switzerland) Alexander Ritschard	6–1, 6–7^{(5–7)}, 6–3
Loss	6–4	Jun 2024	Perugia, Italy	Challenger	Clay	(Italy) Luciano Darderi	1–6, 2–6
Win	7–4	Jun 2026	Târgu Mureș, Romania	Challenger	Clay	(France) Felix Balshaw	6–3, 7–5

== ITF Futures finals ==
=== Singles: 10 (9 titles, 1 runner-up) ===
Legend ITF Futures (9–1)	Finals by surface Hard (2–0) Clay (7–1) Grass (0–0) Carpet (0–0)

Result	W–L	Date	Tournament	Tier	Surface	Opponent	Score
Win	1–0	Jun 2015	India F8, Hyderabad	Futures	Clay	(Argentina) Gustavo Vellbach	6–2, 6–0
Win	2–0	Aug 2015	India F11, Chennai	Futures	Hard	(India) Ronit Singh Bisht	6–3, 6–4
Win	3–0	Sep 2015	India F15, Madurai	Futures	Hard	(India) Vishnu Vardhan	7–6^{(7–5)}, 7–6^{(7–4)}
Win	4–0	Aug 2016	Poland F6, Poznań	Futures	Clay	(Germany) Daniel Masur	6–4, 1–6, 6–3
Win	5–0	Oct 2016	Hungary F7, Balatonboglar	Futures	Clay	(Hungary) Peter Nagy	7–6^{(7–3)}, 6–1
Loss	5–1	May 2017	Romania F2, Bacău	Futures	Clay	(Portugal) Gonçalo Oliveira	6–3, 3–6, 0–6
Win	6–1	Jun 2017	Sri Lanka F1, Colombo	Futures	Clay	(Russia) Alexander Zhurbin	6–3, 6-2
Win	7–1	Jul 2017	Sri Lanka F3, Colombo	Futures	Clay	(Spain) Carlos Bolunda-Purkiss	6–1, 6-1
Win	8–1	Jul 2017	Italy F23, Pontedera	Futures	Clay	(Italy) Andrea Basso	6–4, 6-4
Win	9–1	Sep 2017	India F7, Chennai	Futures	Clay	(Netherlands) Colin Van Beem	6–3, 6-0

=== Doubles: 2 (2 titles) ===
Legend ITF Futures (2–0)

Result	W–L	Date	Tournament	Tier	Surface	Partner	Opponents	Score
Win	1–0	Sep 2015	India F15, Madurai	Futures	Hard	(India) N. Vijay Sundar Prashanth	(India) Anirudh Chandrasekar (India) Vignesh Peranamallur	6–3, 7–5
Win	2–0	Apr 2016	Uzbekistan F1, Karshi	Futures	Hard	(Chinese Taipei) Ti Chen	(Uzbekistan) Sanjar Fayziev (Uzbekistan) Jurabek Karimov	5–5 ret.

== Junior Grand Slam finals ==
=== Doubles: 1 (1 title) ===
Result	Year	Tournament	Surface	Partner	Opponents	Score
Win	2015	Wimbledon	Grass	(Vietnam) Lý Hoàng Nam	(United States) Reilly Opelka (Japan) Akira Santillan	7–6^{(7–4)}, 6–4

== Controversies ==
In 2017, reports surfaced that Nagal had missed a practice session in July 2016 at Chandigarh during the tie against South Korea, citing elbow injury. He was dropped from the Indian Davis Cup squad led by Anand Amritraj which was scheduled to face New Zealand between 3 and 5 February 2017. A source close to All India Tennis Association (AITA) told Sportskeeda, "It is a case of sheer indiscipline, on the part of the player. He missed several training sessions, brought his girlfriend to the camp without informing us. Several other discrepancies have also emerged, which led to the captain taking this call." Nagal denied the allegations. Former India player Somdev Devvarman supported him, stating "I want to be clear once again. You have not chosen Sumit Nagal for the upcoming tie, because Sumit Nagal is NOT available to play. How do I know this? Because I have spent 2 weeks with Sumit in December helping him with his training and his rehab for the current shoulder injury he is recovering from."

== See also ==
- Tennis in India
