= 2021 Saint Petersburg Challenger II – Doubles =

Doubles
- 2021 Saint Petersburg Challenger II

Final
- Champions: (Netherlands) Jesper de Jong (Netherlands) Sem Verbeek
- Runners-up: (Russia) Konstantin Kravchuk (Kazakhstan) Denis Yevseyev
- Score: 6–1, 3–6, [10–5]

Events
Singles	Doubles
← 2021 ·	Saint Petersburg Challenger	· 2022 →

Christopher Eubanks and Roberto Quiroz were the defending champions but chose not to defend their title.

Jesper de Jong and Sem Verbeek won the title after defeating Konstantin Kravchuk and Denis Yevseyev 6–1, 3–6, [10–5] in the final.

== Seeds ==
1. (Russia) Teymuraz Gabashvili / (Kazakhstan) Aleksandr Nedovyesov (first round)
2. (United States) Nathan Pasha / (United States) Max Schnur (quarterfinals)
3. (United States) James Cerretani / (Canada) Adil Shamasdin (first round)
4. (Netherlands) Jesper de Jong / (Netherlands) Sem Verbeek (champions)

== Draw ==
=== Key ===
- Q = Qualifier
- WC = Wild card
- LL = Lucky loser
- Alt = Alternate
- SE = Special exempt
- PR = Protected ranking
- ITF = ITF entry
- JE = Junior exempt
- w/o = Walkover
- r = Retired
- d = Defaulted
- SR = Special ranking

First round
1	(Russia) T Gabashvili (Kazakhstan) A Nedovyesov	1	6	[4]
Alt	(Netherlands) I Sijsling (Netherlands) G Smits	6	3	[10]
(Bosnia and Herzegovina) M Bašić (Australia) H Bourchier	1	1
(Russia) K Kravchuk (Kazakhstan) D Yevseyev	6	6
3	(United States) J Cerretani (Canada) A Shamasdin	6^{6}	4
(Kazakhstan) D Popko (Russia) A Vatutin	7^{8}	6
(Zimbabwe) B Lock (Netherlands) M Vervoort	2	2
(India) A Kadhe (Tunisia) S Mansouri	6	6
WC	(Uzbekistan) K Sultanov (Uzbekistan) V Uzakov	3	1
(Czech Republic) V Kopřiva (Czech Republic) M Vrbenský	6	6
WC	(Russia) D Golubev (Russia) E Tiurnev	4	6^{4}
4	(Netherlands) J de Jong (Netherlands) S Verbeek	6	7^{7}
(Russia) E Karlovskiy (Croatia) N Serdarušić	6	6
Alt	(Netherlands) J Sels (Netherlands) T van Rijthoven	1	2
WC	(Russia) Alexander Igoshin (Russia) I Nedelko	6^{5}	4
2	(United States) N Pasha (United States) M Schnur	7^{7}	6

Quarterfinals
Alt	(Netherlands) I Sijsling (Netherlands) G Smits	2	4
(Russia) K Kravchuk (Kazakhstan) D Yevseyev	6	6
(Kazakhstan) D Popko (Russia) A Vatutin	6	1	[10]
(India) A Kadhe (Tunisia) S Mansouri	4	6	[8]
(Czech Republic) V Kopřiva (Czech Republic) M Vrbenský	0	3
4	(Netherlands) J de Jong (Netherlands) S Verbeek	6	6
(Russia) E Karlovskiy (Croatia) N Serdarušić	6^{3}	6	[10]
2	(United States) N Pasha (United States) M Schnur	7^{7}	3	[4]

Semifinals
(Russia) K Kravchuk (Kazakhstan) D Yevseyev	w/o
(Kazakhstan) D Popko (Russia) A Vatutin
4	(Netherlands) J de Jong (Netherlands) S Verbeek	6	7^{7}
(Russia) E Karlovskiy (Croatia) N Serdarušić	2	6^{2}

Final
(Russia) K Kravchuk (Kazakhstan) D Yevseyev	1	6	[5]
4	(Netherlands) J de Jong (Netherlands) S Verbeek	6	3	[10]
