= 2016 in Indian sport =

2016 in Indian sports describes the year's events in Indian sport. The main highlight for this year for India is the 2016 Olympic and Paralympic Games in Rio de Janeiro and the T20 World cup.

== Calendar by month ==
=== January ===
Date	Sport	Venue/Event	Status	Winner/s
2-17	Badminton	2016 Premier Badminton League	Domestic	Delhi Acers
3	Football	SAFF Championship	South Asian	India became champion by beating Afghanistan in final by 2-1
4-10	Tennis	ATP World Tour 2016 Aircel Chennai Open	International	Singles Stan Wawrinka Doubles Oliver Marach / Fabrice Martin
12-31	Cricket	One Day & T20	bilateral Series between India and Australia	Australia won one day series by 4-1 & India won T20 Series by 3–0.
15-16	Professional Wrestling	Promotional Tour of WWE	WWE Live Promotional Event in Delhi at IGI Stadium.	Roman (C) defeated Rusev in Main Event for the WWE world heavyweight championship
17	Marathon	Mumbai Marathon	International	(Kenya) Gideon Kipketer
18–21 February	Hockey	2016 Hockey India League	Domestic League	Punjab Warriors
22–14 February	Cricket	2016 Under-19 Cricket World Cup	International	West Indies
30 - 5 Mar	Kabaddi	Pro Kabaddi League season 3	Domestic League	Patna Pirates

=== February ===
Date	Sport	Venue/Event	Status	Winner
5-16	Multi-Sports Games	2016 South Asian Games in Guwahati and Shillong	South Asian	India top medal tally with 188 Gold Medals.
24–6 March	cricket	2016 Asia Cup in Bangladesh.	Asia Cup	India

=== March ===
Date	Sport	Venue/Event	Status	Winner/s
8–3 April	cricket	2016 ICC World Twenty20	International	West Indies
15-3 April	Cricket	2016 ICC World Twenty20	International	West Indies
24	Football	India vs Iran	2018 FIFA & 2019 Asian Cup Qualification	Iran
29	Football	India vs Turkmenistan	2018 FIFA & 2019 Asian Cup Qualification	Turkmenistan

=== April ===
Date	Sport	Venue/Event	Status	Winner/s
Field Hockey	2016 Sultan Azlan Shah Cup	Annual International hockey tournament	International	Australia beat India by 4–0 in final
9–21 May	cricket	2016 Indian Premier League	Domestic League	Sunrisers Hyderabad

=== August ===
Date	Sport	Venue/Event	Position	Medals	Medalist
5-21	Olympics	India at the 2016 Summer Olympics	67	2	Silver P. V. Sindhu; Bronze Sakshi Malik

Date	Sport	Venue/Event	winner
21 July - 28 Aug	Cricket	India tour of West Indies & US	India have won Test Series by 2-0 (4 Tests); West Indies won T20 Series by 1-0 (2 T20)

=== September ===
Date	Sport	Venue/Event	Players/Event	Position	Medals
7-18	Paralympics	2016 Summer Paralympics	19 Athletes in 20 Events	42	4
24 Sept - 3 Oct	Asian Beach Games	2016 Asian Beach Games	208 Athletes	16	2 Gold,4 Silver, 18 Bronze

Medalist at 2016 Rio Paralympics

Medal	Name	Sport	Event	Date
1st place, gold medalist(s)	Mariyappan Thangavelu	Athletics	Men's High Jump F42	9 September
1st place, gold medalist(s)	Devendra Jhajharia	Athletics	Men's Javelin Throw F46	14 September
2nd place, silver medalist(s)	Deepa Malik	Athletics	Women's Shot put F53	12 September
3rd place, bronze medalist(s)	Varun Singh Bhati	Athletics	Men's High Jump T42	9 September

Date	Sport	Venue/Event	Winner/Standing
3	International Football	India vs Puerto Rico	India 4 - 1 Puerto Rico
15–2 October	Association football	2016 AFC U-16 Championship	Iraq Win / India finished at Group stage
22 Sept - 29 Oct	Cricket	New Zealand tour of India	India won test series by 3-0 & ODI Series by 3-2

=== October ===
Date	Sport	Venue/Event	Winner
1 Oct - 20 December	Association football	2016 Indian Super League season	Atletico de Kolkata defeated Kerla Blasters in final by 1-1 (4-3) to lift their 2nd Title.
20 - 30 Oct	Field Hockey	2016 Asian Hockey Championship	India won by beating Pakistan by 3–2 in the final.
29 Oct - 5 Nov	Field Hockey	2016 Women's Asian Hockey Championship	India won by beating china in final with 3–2.
7 - 22 Oct	Kabaddi	World Cup	India

=== November ===
Date	Sport	Venue/Event	Winner
5 Nov	Association football	2016 AFC Cup Final	Al-Quwa Al-Jawiya (Qatar) beat Bengaluru FC (India) in final by 1-0
9 Nov - 1 Feb 2017	Cricket	English cricket team in India in 2016–17	India vs England 5 Test Match Series. India won by 4-0

=== December ===
Date	Sport	Venue/Event	Winners
1-11	Hockey	2016 Men's Hockey Junior World Cup	India beat Belgium in final by 2-1 (2nd Title)

| 23 | Cricket | ACC Under-19 Cup |India (273/8) led by captain Abhishek Sharma beat Sri Lanka (239/10) and won the cup

=== Year highlights ===
- India competed in 2016 Rio Olympics & Paralympics and bagged 2 and 4 medals respectively.
- Cricket T20 World cup held in India.
- Indian cricket team finished the year by holding the top ICC test Ranking. Remained unbeaten in 18 Test Matches.
- India won Hockey Junior World cup for second time.
- Domestic League season took place for Hockey, Cricket & Football.
- Indian football team achieved their top rank in past six years as they finished 135 in FIFA Ranking & jumped 31 spot in 2016.
