= 2015 Bangalore Challenger – Doubles =

Doubles
- 2015 Bangalore Challenger

Final
- Champions: (India) Saketh Myneni (India) Sanam Singh
- Runners-up: (United States) John Paul Fruttero (India) Vijay Sundar Prashanth
- Score: 5–7, 6–4, [10–2]

Events
Singles	Doubles
- Bangalore Challenger

Saketh Myneni and Sanam Singh won the title at the inaugural edition of the tournament, defeating John Paul Fruttero and Vijay Sundar Prashanth in the final 5–7, 6–4, [10–2].

== Seeds ==
1. (Austria) Maximilian Neuchrist / (India) Divij Sharan (first round)
2. (India) Saketh Myneni / (India) Sanam Singh (champions)
3. (Chinese Taipei) Chen Ti / (Australia) Dane Propoggia (semifinals)
4. (Spain) Gerard Granollers / (Spain) Adrián Menéndez-Maceiras (semifinals)

== Draw ==
Key

- Q = Qualifier
- WC = Wild card
- LL = Lucky loser
- Alt = Alternate
- ITF = ITF entry
- PR = Protected ranking
- SR = Special ranking
- SE = Special exempt
- JE = Junior exempt
- JR = Junior Accelerator Programme entrant
- CO = College Accelerator Programme entrant
- NG = Next Gen Accelerator Program entrant
- w/o = Walkover
- r = Retired
- d = Defaulted

First round
1	(Austria) M Neuchrist (India) D Sharan	7^{7}	6^{3}	[7]
(Cyprus) P Chrysochos (Uzbekistan) T Ismailov	6^{3}	7^{7}	[10]
WC	(United States) JP Fruttero (India) VS Prashanth	6	6
(Serbia) N Milojević (India) R Ramanathan	3	2
3	(Chinese Taipei) T Chen (Australia) D Propoggia	6	6
(Belgium) A De Greef (France) S Robert	2	2
(Czech Republic) Michal Konecny (Russia) A Kudryavtsev	6	6^{5}	[6]
(India) S Nagal (India) V Vardhan	4	7^{7}	[10]
(Italy) A Bega (United States) D Nguyen	6	6
(Belgium) G Gigounon (Belgium) Y Mertens	2	0
(India) P Raja (United Kingdom) J Ward	4	3
4	(Spain) G Granollers (Spain) A Menéndez-Maceiras	6	6
WC	(India) S Devvarman (India) Christopher Marquis	6^{3}	6^{5}
WC	(India) C Sood (India) L Sood	7^{7}	7^{7}
(Belarus) E Gerasimov (Belarus) I Ivashka	6^{3}	1
2	(India) S Myneni (India) S Singh	7^{7}	6

Quarterfinals
(Cyprus) P Chrysochos (Uzbekistan) T Ismailov	2	2
WC	(United States) JP Fruttero (India) VS Prashanth	6	6
3	(Chinese Taipei) T Chen (Australia) D Propoggia	7^{7}	6
(India) S Nagal (India) V Vardhan	6^{5}	4
(Italy) A Bega (United States) D Nguyen	4	4
4	(Spain) G Granollers (Spain) A Menéndez-Maceiras	6	6
WC	(India) C Sood (India) L Sood	2	4
2	(India) S Myneni (India) S Singh	6	6

Semifinals
WC	(United States) JP Fruttero (India) VS Prashanth	6	3	[10]
3	(Chinese Taipei) T Chen (Australia) D Propoggia	3	6	[8]
4	(Spain) G Granollers (Spain) A Menéndez-Maceiras	4	6^{3}
2	(India) S Myneni (India) S Singh	6	7^{7}

Final
WC	(United States) JP Fruttero (India) VS Prashanth	7	4	[2]
2	(India) S Myneni (India) S Singh	5	6	[10]
