= 2015 Aircel Chennai Open – Singles =

Singles
- 2015 Aircel Chennai Open

Final
- Champion: (Switzerland) Stan Wawrinka
- Runner-up: (Slovenia) Aljaž Bedene
- Score: 6–4, 6–3

Details
- Draw: 28 (4 Q / 3 WC )
- Seeds: 8

Events
Singles	Doubles
← 2014 ·	Aircel Chennai Open	· 2016 →

Stan Wawrinka was the defending champion, and successfully defended his title against Slovenian qualifier Aljaž Bedene, 6–3, 6–4. He did not lose a single set in the entire tournament.

== Seeds ==
The top four seeds received a bye into the second round.

1. (Switzerland) Stan Wawrinka (champion)
2. (Spain) Feliciano López (second round)
3. (Spain) Roberto Bautista Agut (semifinals)
4. (Belgium) David Goffin (semifinals)
5. (Spain) Guillermo García López (quarterfinals)
6. (Chinese Taipei) Lu Yen-hsun (quarterfinals)
7. (Spain) Marcel Granollers (first round, retired because of a knee injury)
8. (Luxembourg) Gilles Müller (quarterfinals)

== Draw ==
=== Finals ===
Semifinals
1	(Switzerland) Stan Wawrinka	7	6
4	(Belgium) David Goffin	5	3
3	(Spain) Roberto Bautista Agut	6	3	6^{8}
Q	(Slovenia) Aljaž Bedene	3	6	7^{10}

Final
1	(Switzerland) Stan Wawrinka	6	6
Q	(Slovenia) Aljaž Bedene	3	4

=== Top half ===
First round
(Croatia) B Ćorić	6	6
(Netherlands) R Haase	2	2
WC	(Sweden) E Ymer	6	4	6
(Netherlands) I Sijsling	4	6	3
(France) É Roger-Vasselin	7^{13}	1	6^{3}
8	(Luxembourg) G Müller	6^{11}	6	7^{7}
(Lithuania) R Berankis	6	2	7
Q	(Italy) L Vanni	1	6	5
Q	(India) V Sundar Prashanth	2	1
(Czech Republic) J Veselý	6	6
(Austria) A Haider-Maurer	3	7^{8}	2
7	(Spain) M Granollers	6	6^{6}	0^{r}

Second round
1	(Switzerland) S Wawrinka	6	6
(Croatia) B Ćorić	1	4
WC	(Sweden) E Ymer	4	3
8	(Luxembourg) G Müller	6	6
4	(Belgium) D Goffin	6	4	7^{7}
(Lithuania) R Berankis	0	6	6^{1}
(Czech Republic) J Veselý	7^{7}	4	4
(Austria) A Haider-Maurer	6^{3}	6	6

Quarterfinals
1	(Switzerland) S Wawrinka	6	7^{7}
8	(Luxembourg) G Müller	2	6^{4}
4	(Belgium) D Goffin	7	6
(Austria) A Haider-Maurer	5	2

Semifinals
1	(Switzerland) S Wawrinka	7	6
4	(Belgium) D Goffin	5	3

=== Bottom half ===
First round
6	(Chinese Taipei) Y-h Lu	6	6
WC	(India) S Devvarman	3	4
(Spain) P Carreño Busta	6	6
(Colombia) A González	1	3
(Germany) P Gojowczyk	6	6
(Colombia) A Falla	0	1
5	(Spain) G García López	6^{3}	6	6
Q	(Russia) E Donskoy	7^{7}	2	3
WC	(India) R Ramanathan	3	3
(Japan) T Ito	6	6
(Slovakia) L Lacko	6^{0}	3
Q	(Slovenia) A Bedene	7^{7}	6

Second round
6	(Chinese Taipei) Y-h Lu	6	6
(Spain) P Carreño Busta	4	4
(Germany) P Gojowczyk	3	2
3	(Spain) R Bautista Agut	6	6
5	(Spain) G García López	6^{1}	6	6
(Japan) T Ito	7^{7}	2	0
Q	(Slovenia) A Bedene	6	6
2	(Spain) F López	4	4

Quarterfinals
6	(Chinese Taipei) Y-h Lu	6^{7}	4
3	(Spain) R Bautista Agut	7^{9}	6
5	(Spain) G García López	6	3	2
Q	(Slovenia) A Bedene	2	6	6

Semifinals
3	(Spain) R Bautista Agut	6	3	6^{8}
Q	(Slovenia) A Bedene	3	6	7^{10}

== Qualifying ==
=== Seeds ===
The top seed received a bye into the second round.

1. (Bosnia and Herzegovina) Damir Džumhur (qualifying competition)
2. (Russia) Alexander Kudryavtsev (second round)
3. (Russia) Evgeny Donskoy (qualified)
4. (Ukraine) Illya Marchenko (qualifying competition)
5. (Slovenia) Aljaž Bedene (qualified)
6. (Italy) Luca Vanni (qualified)
7. (Germany) Peter Torebko (second round)
8. (India) Yuki Bhambri (second round)

=== Qualifiers ===
1. (Italy) Luca Vanni
2. (Slovenia) Aljaž Bedene
3. (Russia) Evgeny Donskoy
4. (India) Vijay Sundar Prashanth

=== Qualifying draw ===
==== First qualifier ====
First round
(New Zealand) Michael Venus	6	6
(India) Chandril Sood	3	4
(Italy) Thomas Fabbiano	6	6
WC	(India) Rahul Robinson Manoah	0	0
WC	(India) Ravi Rashwant	2	2
6	(Italy) Luca Vanni	6	6

Second round
1	(Bosnia and Herzegovina) Damir Džumhur	6	6
(New Zealand) Michael Venus	2	4
(Italy) Thomas Fabbiano	4	2
6	(Italy) Luca Vanni	6	6

Qualifying competition
1	(Bosnia and Herzegovina) Damir Džumhur	7^{7}	4	4
6	(Italy) Luca Vanni	6^{2}	6	6

==== Second qualifier ====
First round
2	(Russia) Alexander Kudryavtsev	6^{4}	7	6
(India) Mohit Mayur Jayaprakash	7^{7}	5	2
(Thailand) Danai Udomchoke	6	4	2
(India) Vinayak Sharma Kaza	3	6	6
(India) Jeevan Nedunchezhiyan	6	6
(India) Lakshit Sood	2	2
WC	(India) Sumit Nagal	2	0
5	(Slovenia) Aljaž Bedene	6	6

Second round
2	(Russia) Alexander Kudryavtsev	4	7^{7}	6^{4}
(India) Vinayak Sharma Kaza	6	6^{5}	7^{7}
(India) Jeevan Nedunchezhiyan	4	4
5	(Slovenia) Aljaž Bedene	6	6

Qualifying competition
(India) Vinayak Sharma Kaza	0	4
5	(Slovenia) Aljaž Bedene	6	6

==== Third qualifier ====
First round
3	(Russia) Evgeny Donskoy	6	6
(Croatia) Mate Pavić	4	4
(Belarus) Egor Gerasimov	6	6
(India) Akash Wang	1	0
WC	(India) Fahad Mohammed	3	4
(India) Sasikumar Mukund	6	6
(Austria) Oliver Marach	3	0^{r}
7	(Germany) Peter Torebko	6	1

Second round
3	(Russia) Evgeny Donskoy	6	1	7
(Belarus) Egor Gerasimov	2	6	5
(India) Sasikumar Mukund	6	1	6
7	(Germany) Peter Torebko	4	6	2

Qualifying competition
3	(Russia) Evgeny Donskoy	6	6
(India) Sasikumar Mukund	0	0

==== Fourth qualifier ====
First round
4	(Ukraine) Illya Marchenko	6	6
(Czech Republic) František Čermák	3	4
(India) Vishnu Vardhan	6	6
(India) Suraj Prabodh	1	3
(India) Vijay Sundar Prashanth	6	5
(India) Niki Kaliyanda Poonacha	1	2^{r}
(India) Sidharth Rawat	1	3
8	(India) Yuki Bhambri	6	6

Second round
4	(Ukraine) Illya Marchenko	7	6
(India) Vishnu Vardhan	5	4
(India) Vijay Sundar Prashanth	1	7^{7}	6
8	(India) Yuki Bhambri	6	6^{3}	3

Qualifying competition
4	(Ukraine) Illya Marchenko	6	6^{7}	5
(India) Vijay Sundar Prashanth	2	7^{9}	7
