= 2021 Saint Petersburg Challenger =

- Date: 1–7 March
- Edition: 1st
- Surface: Hard (Indoor)
- Location: Saint Petersburg, Russia

Champions

Singles
- (Belgium) Zizou Bergs

Doubles
- (United States) Christopher Eubanks / (Ecuador) Roberto Quiroz
- Saint Petersburg Challenger

The 2021 Saint Petersburg Challenger was a professional tennis tournament played on hard courts. It was the first edition of the tournament which was part of the 2021 ATP Challenger Tour. It took place in Saint Petersburg, Russia between 1 and 7 March 2021.

== Singles main-draw entrants ==
=== Seeds ===
Country	Player	Rank^{1}	Seed
RUS	Roman Safiullin	164	1
TUR	Cem İlkel	208	2
GER	Rudolf Molleker	223	3
USA	Christopher Eubanks	240	4
RUS	Teymuraz Gabashvili	247	5
RUS	Alexey Vatutin	258	6
ECU	Roberto Quiroz	262	7
RUS	Evgeny Karlovskiy	267	8

- ^{1} Rankings as of 22 February 2021.

=== Other entrants ===
The following players received wildcards into the singles main draw:

- (Russia) Ivan Gakhov
- (Switzerland) Dominic Stricker
- (Russia) Evgenii Tiurnev

The following players received entry from the qualifying draw:

- (Belgium) Zizou Bergs
- (Monaco) Lucas Catarina
- (Russia) Artem Dubrivnyy
- (Russia) Andrey Kuznetsov

== Champions ==
=== Singles ===
- (Belgium) Zizou Bergs def. (Turkey) Altuğ Çelikbilek 6–4, 3–6, 6–4.

=== Doubles ===
- (United States) Christopher Eubanks / (Ecuador) Roberto Quiroz def. (Netherlands) Jesper de Jong / (Netherlands) Sem Verbeek 6–4, 6–3.
