= 2021 Saint Petersburg Challenger – Singles =

Singles
- 2021 Saint Petersburg Challenger

Final
- Champion: (Belgium) Zizou Bergs
- Runner-up: (Turkey) Altuğ Çelikbilek
- Score: 6–4, 3–6, 6–4

Events
Singles	Doubles
Saint Petersburg Challenger	· 2021 →

This was the first edition of the tournament.

Zizou Bergs won the title after defeating Altuğ Çelikbilek 6–4, 3–6, 6–4 in the final.

== Seeds ==
1. (Russia) Roman Safiullin (first round)
2. (Turkey) Cem İlkel (quarterfinals)
3. (Germany) Rudolf Molleker (first round)
4. (United States) Christopher Eubanks (first round)
5. (Russia) Teymuraz Gabashvili (first round)
6. (Russia) Alexey Vatutin (second round)
7. (Ecuador) Roberto Quiroz (second round)
8. (Russia) Evgeny Karlovskiy (first round)

== Draw ==
=== Key ===
- Q = Qualifier
- WC = Wild card
- LL = Lucky loser
- Alt = Alternate
- SE = Special exempt
- PR = Protected ranking
- ITF = ITF entry
- JE = Junior exempt
- w/o = Walkover
- r = Retired
- d = Defaulted
- SR = Special ranking

=== Finals ===
Semifinals
(Turkey) Altuğ Çelikbilek	5	6	6
Q	(Russia) Artem Dubrivnyy	7	2	3
Q	(Belgium) Zizou Bergs	7^{9}	6
(Czech Republic) Vít Kopřiva	6^{7}	2

Final
(Turkey) Altuğ Çelikbilek	4	6	4
Q	(Belgium) Zizou Bergs	6	3	6

=== Top half ===
First round
1	(Russia) R Safiullin	5	4
WC	(Russia) E Tiurnev	7	6
(Netherlands) J de Jong	6	4	6
(Belarus) U Ignatik	4	6	3
(Turkey) A Çelikbilek	6	6
(Uzbekistan) K Sultanov	4	1
(Croatia) N Serdarušić	4	6	0
6	(Russia) A Vatutin	6	3	6
3	(Germany) R Molleker	6^{2}	4
(Norway) V Durasovic	7^{7}	6
(Netherlands) I Sijsling	6	4	3
Q	(Russia) A Dubrivnyy	3	6	6
(Croatia) M Pecotić	6^{0}	2
Q	(Russia) A Kuznetsov	7^{7}	6
(Bosnia and Herzegovina) M Bašić	6	6
8	(Russia) E Karlovskiy	0	4

Second round
WC	(Russia) E Tiurnev	3	3
(Netherlands) J de Jong	6	6
(Turkey) A Çelikbilek	6	7^{7}
6	(Russia) A Vatutin	3	6^{3}
(Norway) V Durasovic	5	6	3
Q	(Russia) A Dubrivnyy	7	3	6
Q	(Russia) A Kuznetsov	6	6
(Bosnia and Herzegovina) M Bašić	1	1

Quarterfinals
(Netherlands) J de Jong	6^{7}	0
(Turkey) A Çelikbilek	7^{9}	6
Q	(Russia) A Dubrivnyy	6	6^{8}	6
Q	(Russia) A Kuznetsov	3	7^{10}	3

Semifinals
(Turkey) A Çelikbilek	5	6	6
Q	(Russia) A Dubrivnyy	7	2	3

=== Bottom half ===
First round
5	(Russia) T Gabashvili	4	2
(Russia) P Kotov	6	6
Q	(Belgium) Z Bergs	6	6
(Australia) H Bourchier	4	2
(Australia) M Ebden	6	6
(Serbia) P Krstin	1	4
Q	(Monaco) L Catarina	7	6
4	(United States) C Eubanks	5	2
7	(Ecuador) R Quiroz	6	6
(South Korea) D-h Lee	2	2
WC	(Russia) I Gakhov	5	6	6^{7}
(Czech Republic) V Kopřiva	7	1	7^{9}
WC	(Switzerland) D Stricker	5	6	6
(Croatia) D Ajduković	7	4	2
(Japan) Shuichi Sekiguchi	3	2
2	(Turkey) C İlkel	6	6

Second round
(Russia) P Kotov	0	5
Q	(Belgium) Z Bergs	6	7
(Australia) M Ebden	6^{4}	2
Q	(Monaco) L Catarina	7^{7}	6
7	(Ecuador) R Quiroz	2	4
(Czech Republic) V Kopřiva	6	6
WC	(Switzerland) D Stricker	7^{7}	3	3
2	(Turkey) C İlkel	6^{5}	6	6

Quarterfinals
Q	(Belgium) Z Bergs	6	6
Q	(Monaco) L Catarina	3	4
(Czech Republic) V Kopřiva	7	6
2	(Turkey) C İlkel	5	2

Semifinals
Q	(Belgium) Z Bergs	7^{9}	6
(Czech Republic) V Kopřiva	6^{7}	2
