= 2015 Aircel Chennai Open – Doubles =

Doubles
- 2015 Aircel Chennai Open

Final
- Champion: (Chinese Taipei) Lu Yen-hsun (United Kingdom) Jonathan Marray
- Runner-up: (South Africa) Raven Klaasen (India) Leander Paes
- Score: 6–3, 7-6^{(7–4)}

Details
- Draw: 16
- Seeds: 4

Events
Singles	Doubles
← 2014 ·	Maharashtra Open	· 2016 →

Johan Brunström and Frederik Nielsen were the defending champions, but Nielsen chose not to participate. Brunström played alongside Nicholas Monroe, but lost in the first round to Roberto Bautista Agut and Stan Wawrinka.
Lu Yen-hsun and Jonathan Marray won the title, defeating Raven Klaasen and Leander Paes in the final, 6–3, 7-6^{(7–4)}.

== Seeds ==
1. (South Africa) Raven Klaasen / (India) Leander Paes (final)
2. (Germany) Andre Begemann / (Netherlands) Robin Haase (quarterfinals)
3. (Sweden) Johan Brunström / (United States) Nicholas Monroe (first round)
4. (Austria) Oliver Marach / (New Zealand) Michael Venus (first round)

== Draw ==
=== Key ===
- Q = Qualifier
- WC = Wild card
- LL = Lucky loser
- Alt = Alternate
- SE = Special exempt
- PR = Protected ranking
- ITF = ITF entry
- JE = Junior exempt
- w/o = Walkover
- r = Retired
- d = Defaulted
- SR = Special ranking

=== Draw ===
First round
1	(South Africa) R Klaasen (India) L Paes	6	6
(Austria) A Haider-Maurer (Slovakia) L Lacko	4	4
WC	(India) M Bhupathi (India) S Myneni	6^{4}	6	[10]
Alt	(India) C Sood (India) L Sood	7^{7}	4	[6]
4	(Austria) O Marach (New Zealand) M Venus	6	5	[10]
(Spain) P Carreño Busta (Spain) G García López	2	7	[12]
(Lithuania) R Berankis (Croatia) M Pavić	7^{9}	3	[10]
(Luxembourg) G Müller (Netherlands) I Sijsling	6^{7}	6	[8]
(India) P Raja (Canada) A Shamasdin	6	6
(Slovenia) A Bedene (Bosnia and Herzegovina) D Džumhur	1	2
(Spain) R Bautista Agut (Switzerland) S Wawrinka	5	6	[10]
3	(Sweden) J Brunström (United States) N Monroe	7	3	[8]
(Chinese Taipei) Y-h Lu (United Kingdom) J Marray	6	4	[10]
WC	(India) S Balaji (India) J Nedunchezhiyan	3	6	[6]
(Czech Republic) F Čermák (Czech Republic) J Veselý	6^{2}	4
2	(Germany) A Begemann (Netherlands) R Haase	7^{7}	6

Quarterfinals
1	(South Africa) R Klaasen (India) L Paes	1	6	[10]
WC	(India) M Bhupathi (India) S Myneni	6	1	[7]
(Spain) P Carreño Busta (Spain) G García López	6	0	[10]
(Lithuania) R Berankis (Croatia) M Pavić	4	6	[4]
(India) P Raja (Canada) A Shamasdin	7^{7}	4	[10]
(Spain) R Bautista Agut (Switzerland) S Wawrinka	6^{5}	6	[4]
(Chinese Taipei) Y-h Lu (United Kingdom) J Marray	3	7^{7}	[10]
2	(Germany) A Begemann (Netherlands) R Haase	6	6^{2}	[6]

Semifinals
1	(South Africa) R Klaasen (India) L Paes	6	6
(Spain) P Carreño Busta (Spain) G García López	3	3
(India) P Raja (Canada) A Shamasdin	7	3	[8]
(Chinese Taipei) Y-h Lu (United Kingdom) J Marray	5	6	[10]

Final
1	(South Africa) R Klaasen (India) L Paes	3	6^{4}
(Chinese Taipei) Y-h Lu (United Kingdom) J Marray	6	7^{7}
