= 2021 Saint Petersburg Challenger II – Singles =

Singles
- 2021 Saint Petersburg Challenger II

Final
- Champion: (Russia) Evgenii Tiurnev
- Runner-up: (Poland) Kacper Żuk
- Score: 6–4, 6–2

Events
Singles	Doubles
← 2021 ·	Saint Petersburg Challenger	· 2022 →

Zizou Bergs was the defending champion but lost in the second round to Kacper Żuk.

Evgenii Tiurnev won the title after defeating Żuk 6–4, 6–2 in the final.

== Seeds ==
1. (Russia) Roman Safiullin (first round)
2. (Kazakhstan) Dmitry Popko (quarterfinals)
3. (Turkey) Cem İlkel (first round)
4. (Romania) Marius Copil (semifinals)
5. (Germany) Rudolf Molleker (second round)
6. (Poland) Kacper Żuk (final)
7. (United States) Christopher Eubanks (quarterfinals)
8. (Russia) Teymuraz Gabashvili (first round)

== Draw ==
=== Key ===
- Q = Qualifier
- WC = Wild card
- LL = Lucky loser
- Alt = Alternate
- SE = Special exempt
- PR = Protected ranking
- ITF = ITF entry
- JE = Junior exempt
- w/o = Walkover
- r = Retired
- d = Defaulted
- SR = Special ranking

=== Finals ===
Semifinals
WC	(Russia) Evgenii Tiurnev	7^{7}	6
4	(Romania) Marius Copil	6^{4}	2
6	(Poland) Kacper Żuk	7^{9}	6
Q	(Czech Republic) Jiří Lehečka	6^{7}	3

Final
WC	(Russia) Evgenii Tiurnev	6	6
6	(Poland) Kacper Żuk	4	2

=== Top half ===
First round
1	(Russia) R Safiullin	4	6^{7}
Q	(Bosnia and Herzegovina) M Bašić	6	7^{9}
(Spain) R Ortega Olmedo	6	6
(Ecuador) R Quiroz	3	3
(Czech Republic) V Kopřiva	4	2
WC	(Russia) E Tiurnev	6	6
(Turkey) A Çelikbilek	6	6
8	(Russia) T Gabashvili	2	2
4	(Romania) M Copil	6	6
Alt	(Czech Republic) M Vrbenský	3	1
(South Korea) D-h Lee	6	1	1
(Russia) A Vatutin	0	6	6
(Croatia) D Ajduković	7	6
(Japan) Shuichi Sekiguchi	5	2
Alt	(Netherlands) J de Jong	5	4
7	(United States) C Eubanks	7	6

Second round
Q	(Bosnia and Herzegovina) M Bašić	6	7^{7}
(Spain) R Ortega Olmedo	1	6^{3}
WC	(Russia) E Tiurnev	6	2	6
(Turkey) A Çelikbilek	3	6	3
4	(Romania) M Copil	5	6	6
(Russia) A Vatutin	7	3	1
(Croatia) D Ajduković	3	3
7	(United States) C Eubanks	6	6

Quarterfinals
Q	(Bosnia and Herzegovina) M Bašić	4	2
WC	(Russia) E Tiurnev	6	6
4	(Romania) M Copil	7^{7}	7
7	(United States) C Eubanks	6^{1}	5

Semifinals
WC	(Russia) E Tiurnev	7^{7}	6
4	(Romania) M Copil	6^{4}	2

=== Bottom half ===
First round
6	(Poland) K Żuk	6	6
(Netherlands) I Sijsling	4	3
SE	(Belgium) Z Bergs	6	6
(Serbia) P Krstin	2	1
(Russia) P Kotov	6	6
Q	(Netherlands) T van Rijthoven	2	4
(United States) J Sock	5	6	6
3	(Turkey) C İlkel	7	4	4
5	(Germany) R Molleker	6	7
(Russia) E Karlovskiy	3	5
Q	(Czech Republic) J Lehečka	6	7^{7}
Q	(Croatia) M Pecotić	2	6^{4}
WC	(Kazakhstan) D Yevseyev	6	6
WC	(Uzbekistan) V Uzakov	0	0
(Croatia) N Serdarušić	4	4
2	(Kazakhstan) D Popko	6	6

Second round
6	(Poland) K Żuk	1	6	6
SE	(Belgium) Z Bergs	6	4	3
(Russia) P Kotov	4	3
(United States) J Sock	6	6
5	(Germany) R Molleker	2	3
Q	(Czech Republic) J Lehečka	6	6
WC	(Kazakhstan) D Yevseyev	4	6	4
2	(Kazakhstan) D Popko	6	2	6

Quarterfinals
6	(Poland) K Żuk	6	6
(United States) J Sock	3	2
Q	(Czech Republic) J Lehečka	6	6
2	(Kazakhstan) D Popko	4	4

Semifinals
6	(Poland) K Żuk	7^{9}	6
Q	(Czech Republic) J Lehečka	6^{7}	3
