= 2021 Saint Petersburg Challenger II =

Professional tennis tournament

- Date: 8–14 March
- Edition: 2nd
- Surface: Hard (Indoor)
- Location: Saint Petersburg, Russia

Champions

Singles
- (Russia) Evgenii Tiurnev

Doubles
- (Netherlands) Jesper de Jong / (Netherlands) Sem Verbeek
- Saint Petersburg Challenger

The 2021 Saint Petersburg Challenger II was a professional tennis tournament played on hard courts. It was the second edition of the Saint Petersburg Challenger which was part of the 2021 ATP Challenger Tour. It took place in Saint Petersburg, Russia between 8 and 14 March 2021.

== Singles main-draw entrants ==
=== Seeds ===
Country	Player	Rank^{1}	Seed
RUS	Roman Safiullin	164	1
KAZ	Dmitry Popko	183	2
TUR	Cem İlkel	210	3
ROU	Marius Copil	224	4
GER	Rudolf Molleker	226	5
POL	Kacper Żuk	232	6
USA	Christopher Eubanks	239	7
RUS	Teymuraz Gabashvili	249	8

- ^{1} Rankings as of 1 March 2021.

=== Other entrants ===
The following players received wildcards into the singles main draw:

- (Russia) Evgenii Tiurnev
- (Uzbekistan) Vaja Uzakov
- (Kazakhstan) Denis Yevseyev

The following player received entry into the singles main draw as a special exempt:

- (Belgium) Zizou Bergs

The following players received entry into the singles main draw as alternates:

- (Netherlands) Jesper de Jong
- (Czech Republic) Michael Vrbenský

The following players received entry from the qualifying draw:

- (Bosnia and Herzegovina) Mirza Bašić
- (Czech Republic) Jiří Lehečka
- (Croatia) Matija Pecotić
- (Netherlands) Tim van Rijthoven

== Champions ==
=== Singles ===
- (Russia) Evgenii Tiurnev def. (Poland) Kacper Żuk 6–4, 6–2.

=== Doubles ===
- (Netherlands) Jesper de Jong / (Netherlands) Sem Verbeek def. (Russia) Konstantin Kravchuk / (Kazakhstan) Denis Yevseyev 6–1, 3–6, [10–5].
