= 2021 Saint Petersburg Challenger – Doubles =

Doubles
- 2021 Saint Petersburg Challenger

Final
- Champions: (United States) Christopher Eubanks (Ecuador) Roberto Quiroz
- Runners-up: (Netherlands) Jesper de Jong (Netherlands) Sem Verbeek
- Score: 6–4, 6–3

Events
Singles	Doubles
- Saint Petersburg Challenger

This was the first edition of the tournament.

Christopher Eubanks and Roberto Quiroz won the title after defeating Jesper de Jong and Sem Verbeek 6–4, 6–3 in the final.

== Seeds ==
1. (Netherlands) Jesper de Jong / (Netherlands) Sem Verbeek (final)
2. (United States) Christopher Eubanks / (Ecuador) Roberto Quiroz (champions)
3. (Russia) Teymuraz Gabashvili / (Russia) Konstantin Kravchuk (quarterfinals)
4. (India) Arjun Kadhe / (Zimbabwe) Benjamin Lock (quarterfinals)

== Draw ==
Key

- Q = Qualifier
- WC = Wild card
- LL = Lucky loser
- Alt = Alternate
- ITF = ITF entry
- PR = Protected ranking
- SR = Special ranking
- SE = Special exempt
- JE = Junior exempt
- JR = Junior Accelerator Programme entrant
- CO = College Accelerator Programme entrant
- NG = Next Gen Accelerator Program entrant
- w/o = Walkover
- r = Retired
- d = Defaulted

First round
1	(Netherlands) J de Jong (Netherlands) S Verbeek	6	3	[10]
(Turkey) E Kırkın (Germany) R Molleker	2	6	[6]
(Russia) P Kotov (Russia) R Safiullin	6	6
(Belarus) U Ignatik (Czech Republic) V Kopřiva	1	2
3	(Russia) T Gabashvili (Russia) K Kravchuk	6	6
(Russia) E Karlovskiy (Croatia) N Serdarušić	3	4
WC	(Russia) I Gakhov (Russia) Alexander Igoshin	6	6^{3}	[6]
(Italy) A Bega (Tunisia) S Mansouri	3	7^{7}	[10]
WC	(Russia) D Golubev (Russia) E Tiurnev	6^{6}	3
(Germany) B Hassan (Russia) A Vatutin	7^{8}	6
(Turkey) A Çelikbilek (Turkey) C İlkel	4	1
4	(India) A Kadhe (Zimbabwe) B Lock	6	6
(Moldova) A Cozbinov (Japan) Shuichi Sekiguchi	6^{4}	7^{7}	[2]
(Australia) H Bourchier (Netherlands) M Vervoort	7^{7}	6^{1}	[10]
WC	(Russia) Aleksei Abazov (Russia) Alexander Vasilenko	6	1	[5]
2	(United States) C Eubanks (Ecuador) R Quiroz	4	6	[10]

Quarterfinals
1	(Netherlands) J de Jong (Netherlands) S Verbeek	6	6
(Russia) P Kotov (Russia) R Safiullin	2	2
3	(Russia) T Gabashvili (Russia) K Kravchuk	3	6	[6]
(Italy) A Bega (Tunisia) S Mansouri	6	3	[10]
(Germany) B Hassan (Russia) A Vatutin	7	7
4	(India) A Kadhe (Zimbabwe) B Lock	5	5
(Australia) H Bourchier (Netherlands) M Vervoort	7^{9}	2	[8]
2	(United States) C Eubanks (Ecuador) R Quiroz	6^{7}	6	[10]

Semifinals
1	(Netherlands) J de Jong (Netherlands) S Verbeek	6	6
(Italy) A Bega (Tunisia) S Mansouri	2	3
(Germany) B Hassan (Russia) A Vatutin	4	2
2	(United States) C Eubanks (Ecuador) R Quiroz	6	6

Final
1	(Netherlands) J de Jong (Netherlands) S Verbeek	4	3
2	(United States) C Eubanks (Ecuador) R Quiroz	6	6
