= 2015 Bangalore Challenger =

- Date: 19–25 October
- Edition: 1st
- Draw: 32S / 16D
- Prize money: $50,000
- Surface: Hard / Outdoors
- Location: Bangalore, India

Champions

Singles
- (United Kingdom) James Ward

Doubles
- (India) Saketh Myneni / (India) Sanam Singh
- Bangalore Challenger

The 2015 Bangalore Challenger was a professional tennis tournament played on hard courts. It was part of the 2015 ATP Challenger Tour. The tournament took place in Bangalore, India between 19 and 25 October 2015.

== Singles main draw entrants ==
=== Seeds ===
Country	Player	Rank^{1}	Seed
ESP	Adrián Menéndez-Maceiras	137	1
GBR	James Ward	157	2
IND	Saketh Myneni	168	3
IND	Somdev Devvarman	175	4
BEL	Yannick Mertens	180	5
TPE	Chen Ti	192	6
RUS	Alexander Kudryavtsev	198	7
BEL	Germain Gigounon	217	8

- ^{1} Rankings are as of October 12, 2015.

=== Other entrants ===
The following players received wildcards into the singles main draw:

- (India) Mohit Mayur Jayaprakash
- (India) Sumit Nagal
- (India) Suraj Prabodh
- (India) Vishnu Vardhan

The following players received entry from the qualifying draw:

- (Cyprus) Petros Chrysochos
- (India) Prajnesh Gunneswaran
- (Uzbekistan) Temur Ismailov
- (India) Sidharth Rawat

The following player entered as a lucky loser:

- (India) Lakshit Sood

== Champions ==
=== Singles ===
- (United Kingdom) James Ward def. (Spain) Adrián Menéndez-Maceiras, 6–2, 7–5

=== Doubles ===
- (India) Saketh Myneni / (India) Sanam Singh def. (United States) John Paul Fruttero / (India) Vijay Sundar Prashanth, 5–7, 6–4, [10–2]
