= 2017 President's Cup – Men's singles =

Men's singles
- 2017 President's Cup (tennis)

Final
- Champion: (Belarus) Egor Gerasimov
- Runner-up: (Kazakhstan) Mikhail Kukushkin
- Score: 7–6^{(11–9)}, 4–6, 6–4

Events
Singles	men	women
Doubles	men	women
- President's Cup (tennis)

Evgeny Donskoy was the defending champion but lost in the quarterfinals to Egor Gerasimov.

Gerasimov won the title after defeating Mikhail Kukushkin 7–6^{(11–9)}, 4–6, 6–4 in the final.

== Seeds ==
1. (Russia) Evgeny Donskoy (quarterfinals)
2. (Kazakhstan) Mikhail Kukushkin (final)
3. (Kazakhstan) Alexander Bublik (semifinals)
4. (South Korea) Lee Duck-hee (quarterfinals)
5. (Belarus) Egor Gerasimov (champion)
6. (Serbia) Nikola Milojević (second round)
7. (South Korea) Kwon Soon-woo (quarterfinals)
8. (Bosnia and Herzegovina) Aldin Šetkić (semifinals)

== Draw ==
Key

- Q = Qualifier
- WC = Wild card
- LL = Lucky loser
- Alt = Alternate
- ITF = ITF entry
- PR = Protected ranking
- SR = Special ranking
- SE = Special exempt
- JE = Junior exempt
- JR = Junior Accelerator Programme entrant
- CO = College Accelerator Programme entrant
- NG = Next Gen Accelerator Program entrant
- w/o = Walkover
- r = Retired
- d = Defaulted

=== Finals ===
Semifinals
5	(Belarus) Egor Gerasimov	6	6
8	(Bosnia and Herzegovina) Aldin Šetkić	3	2
3	(Kazakhstan) Alexander Bublik	2	4
2	(Kazakhstan) Mikhail Kukushkin	6	6

Final
5	(Belarus) Egor Gerasimov	7^{11}	4	6
2	(Kazakhstan) Mikhail Kukushkin	6^{9}	6	4

=== Top half ===
First round
1	(Russia) E Donskoy	6	6
WC	(Kazakhstan) D Yevseyev	2	2
(Russia) A Kudryavtsev	6^{2}	6	6
Q	(Russia) E Tyurnev	7^{7}	0	4
(Turkey) C İlkel	6	6
(Japan) Yuya Kibi	4	4
WC	(Kazakhstan) A Golubev	1	1
5	(Belarus) E Gerasimov	6	6
4	(South Korea) D-h Lee	1	7^{7}	6
(Serbia) M Kecmanović	6	6^{4}	3
WC	(Kazakhstan) G Lomakin	3	6^{4}
Q	(India) S Myneni	6	7^{7}
Q	(Russia) E Karlovskiy	3	5
(Spain) R Ortega Olmedo	6	7
(Czech Republic) Michal Konečný	3	0
8	(Bosnia and Herzegovina) A Šetkić	6	6

Second round
1	(Russia) E Donskoy	7^{10}	6
(Russia) A Kudryavtsev	6^{8}	4
(Turkey) C İlkel	2	3
5	(Belarus) E Gerasimov	6	6
4	(South Korea) D-h Lee	6	6
Q	(India) S Myneni	0	4
(Spain) R Ortega Olmedo	2	6^{2}
8	(Bosnia and Herzegovina) A Šetkić	6	7^{7}

Quarterfinals
1	(Russia) E Donskoy	6^{9}	6	3
5	(Belarus) E Gerasimov	7^{11}	4	6
4	(South Korea) D-h Lee	6^{6}	3
8	(Bosnia and Herzegovina) A Šetkić	7^{8}	6

Semifinals
5	(Belarus) E Gerasimov	6	6
8	(Bosnia and Herzegovina) A Šetkić	3	2

=== Bottom half ===
First round
7	(South Korea) S-w Kwon	6	6
(Turkey) M İlhan	4	4
(Bolivia) H Dellien	6^{4}	0
Q	(France) H Grenier	7^{7}	6
(Belarus) D Zhyrmont	2	6	3
(Japan) Shuichi Sekiguchi	6	1	6
(France) S Doumbia	2	2
3	(Kazakhstan) A Bublik	6	6
6	(Serbia) N Milojević	6	6
PR	(Uzbekistan) F Dustov	2	1
(Kazakhstan) D Popko	7	6
WC	(Kazakhstan) R Khassanov	5	3
(Russia) I Nedelko	6^{5}	4
(Belarus) Y Shyla	7^{7}	6
(Ukraine) V Manafov	6	4	3
2	(Kazakhstan) M Kukushkin	3	6	6

Second round
7	(South Korea) S-w Kwon	6	6
Q	(France) H Grenier	4	2
(Japan) S Sekiguchi	3	5
3	(Kazakhstan) A Bublik	6	7
6	(Serbia) N Milojević	3	5
(Kazakhstan) D Popko	6	7
(Belarus) Y Shyla	4	1
2	(Kazakhstan) M Kukushkin	6	6

Quarterfinals
7	(South Korea) S-w Kwon	6^{1}	2
3	(Kazakhstan) A Bublik	7^{7}	6
(Kazakhstan) D Popko	2	5
2	(Kazakhstan) M Kukushkin	6	7

Semifinals
3	(Kazakhstan) A Bublik	2	4
2	(Kazakhstan) M Kukushkin	6	6
