= 2017 President's Cup =

2017 President's Cup may refer to:

- 2017 Indonesia President's Cup, football
- 2017 President of Ireland's Cup, football
- 2017 President's Cup (Maldives), football
- 2017 President's Cup (tennis)
