= 2015 Bangalore Challenger – Singles =

Singles
- 2015 Bangalore Challenger

Final
- Champion: (United Kingdom) James Ward
- Runner-up: (Spain) Adrián Menéndez-Maceiras
- Score: 6–2, 7–5

Events
Singles	Doubles
- Bangalore Challenger

James Ward won the title defeating Adrián Menéndez-Maceiras in the final 6–2, 7–5.

== Seeds ==
1. (Spain) Adrián Menéndez-Maceiras (final)
2. (United Kingdom) James Ward (champion)
3. (India) Saketh Myneni (semifinals)
4. (India) Somdev Devvarman (second round)
5. (Belgium) Yannick Mertens (quarterfinals)
6. (Chinese Taipei) Chen Ti (second round)
7. (Russia) Alexander Kudryavtsev (second round)
8. (Belgium) Germain Gigounon (first round)

== Draw ==
Key

- Q = Qualifier
- WC = Wild card
- LL = Lucky loser
- Alt = Alternate
- ITF = ITF entry
- PR = Protected ranking
- SR = Special ranking
- SE = Special exempt
- JE = Junior exempt
- JR = Junior Accelerator Programme entrant
- CO = College Accelerator Programme entrant
- NG = Next Gen Accelerator Program entrant
- w/o = Walkover
- r = Retired
- d = Defaulted

=== Finals ===
Semifinals
1	(Spain) Adrián Menéndez-Maceiras	6	6
3	(India) Saketh Myneni	4	4
(United States) Daniel Nguyen	6	4	3
2	(United Kingdom) James Ward	4	6	6

Final
1	(Spain) Adrián Menéndez-Maceiras	2	5
2	(United Kingdom) James Ward	6	7

=== Top half ===
First round
1	(Spain) A Menéndez-Maceiras	6	6
Q	(Cyprus) P Chrysochos	4	4
WC	(India) MM Jayaprakash	4	3
Q	(India) P Gunneswaran	6	6
(Belgium) A De Greef	6	6
WC	(India) Suraj Prabodh	3	4
Q	(Uzbekistan) T Ismailov	2	4
6	(Chinese Taipei) T Chen	6	6
3	(India) S Myneni	6	7^{7}
(Serbia) N Milojević	3	6^{4}
(Australia) D Propoggia	6	6
(Spain) G Granollers	4	3
WC	(India) S Nagal	6	6
Q	(India) Sidharth Rawat	4	3
(India) VS Prashanth	2	2
5	(Belgium) Y Mertens	6	6

Second round
1	(Spain) A Menéndez-Maceiras	6	3	6
Q	(India) P Gunneswaran	2	6	3
(Belgium) A De Greef	7	7
6	(Chinese Taipei) T Chen	5	5
3	(India) S Myneni	6	7^{11}
(Australia) D Propoggia	4	6^{9}
(India) S Nagal	2	6^{5}
5	(Belgium) Y Mertens	6	7^{7}

Quarterfinals
1	(Spain) A Menéndez-Maceiras	6	6
(Belgium) A De Greef	3	4
3	(India) S Myneni	6	7^{8}
5	(Belgium) Y Mertens	3	6^{6}

Semifinals
1	(Spain) A Menéndez-Maceiras	6	6
3	(India) S Myneni	4	4

=== Bottom half ===
First round
7	(Russia) A Kudryavtsev	6	6
(Czech Republic) Michal Konecny	3	3
(France) S Robert	6^{2}	6	5
(United States) D Nguyen	7^{7}	3	7
(France) M Janvier	2	4
(Italy) A Bega	6	6
(Austria) M Neuchrist	4	3
4	(India) S Devvarman	6	6
8	(Belgium) G Gigounon	4	0
(India) S Singh	6	6
(India) R Ramanathan	6	6^{3}	4
(Bulgaria) E Gerasimov	3	7^{7}	6
(Belarus) I Ivashka	7^{7}	6
WC	(India) V Vardhan	6^{5}	1
LL	(India) L Sood	1	1
2	(United Kingdom) J Ward	6	6

Second round
7	(Russia) A Kudryavtsev	6^{7}	6^{3}
(United States) D Nguyen	7^{9}	7^{7}
(Italy) A Bega	7^{9}	7
4	(India) S Devvarman	6^{7}	5
(India) S Singh	6	2	7^{8}
(Bulgaria) E Gerasimov	2	6	6^{6}
(Belarus) I Ivashka	3	4
2	(United Kingdom) J Ward	6	6

Quarterfinals
(United States) D Nguyen	7	6
(Italy) A Bega	5	4
(India) S Singh	3	2
2	(United Kingdom) J Ward	6	6

Semifinals
(United States) D Nguyen	6	4	3
2	(United Kingdom) J Ward	4	6	6
