= 2017 President's Cup – Men's doubles =

Men's doubles
- 2017 President's Cup (tennis)

Final
- Champions: (Japan) Toshihide Matsui (India) Vishnu Vardhan
- Runners-up: (Russia) Evgeny Karlovskiy (Russia) Evgeny Tyurnev
- Score: 7–6^{(7–3)}, 6–7^{(5–7)}, [10–7]

Events
Singles	men	women
Doubles	men	women
- President's Cup (tennis)

Yaraslav Shyla and Andrei Vasilevski were the defending champions but only Shyla chose to defend his title, partnering Vladyslav Manafov. Shyla lost in the quarterfinals to Evgeny Karlovskiy and Evgeny Tyurnev.

Toshihide Matsui and Vishnu Vardhan won the title after defeating Karlovskiy and Tyurnev 7–6^{(7–3)}, 6–7^{(5–7)}, [10–7] in the final.

== Seeds ==
1. (Japan) Toshihide Matsui / (India) Vishnu Vardhan (champions)
2. (Ukraine) Vladyslav Manafov / (Belarus) Yaraslav Shyla (quarterfinals)
3. (Russia) Alexander Kudryavtsev / (India) Saketh Myneni (first round)
4. (Kazakhstan) Timur Khabibulin / (Belarus) Dzmitry Zhyrmont (quarterfinals)

== Draw ==
Key

- Q = Qualifier
- WC = Wild card
- LL = Lucky loser
- Alt = Alternate
- ITF = ITF entry
- PR = Protected ranking
- SR = Special ranking
- SE = Special exempt
- JE = Junior exempt
- JR = Junior Accelerator Programme entrant
- CO = College Accelerator Programme entrant
- NG = Next Gen Accelerator Program entrant
- w/o = Walkover
- r = Retired
- d = Defaulted

First round
1	(Japan) T Matsui (India) V Vardhan	7	6
WC	(Kazakhstan) Timur Maulenov (Kazakhstan) D Yevseyev	5	1
(Serbia) N Milojević (Bosnia and Herzegovina) A Šetkić	4	7^{7}	[10]
(South Korea) S-w Kwon (South Korea) D-h Lee	6	6^{5}	[8]
3	(Russia) A Kudryavtsev (India) S Myneni	6	4	[3]
(France) S Doumbia (Czech Republic) Michal Konečný	3	6	[10]
(Bolivia) H Dellien (Spain) R Ortega Olmedo	6	6
WC	(Kazakhstan) Sagadat Ayap (Kazakhstan) G Lomakin	1	4
(Kazakhstan) A Golubev (Kazakhstan) D Popko	7	7^{7}
(Japan) Yuya Kibi (Japan) Shuichi Sekiguchi	5	6^{4}
(Turkey) A Çelikbilek (Turkey) A Yüksel	4	2
4	(Kazakhstan) T Khabibulin (Belarus) D Zhyrmont	6	6
(Russia) E Karlovskiy (Russia) E Tyurnev	7^{7}	6
(Kazakhstan) A Bublik (Kazakhstan) R Khassanov	6^{5}	3
WC	(Kyrgyzstan) D Duldaev (Kazakhstan) B Zhukayev	1	1^{r}
2	(Ukraine) V Manafov (Belarus) Y Shyla	6	0

Quarterfinals
1	(Japan) T Matsui (India) V Vardhan	6^{3}	6	[10]
(Serbia) N Milojević (Bosnia and Herzegovina) A Šetkić	7^{7}	4	[8]
(France) S Doumbia (Czech Republic) M Konečný	6	6
(Bolivia) H Dellien (Spain) R Ortega Olmedo	1	2
(Kazakhstan) A Golubev (Kazakhstan) D Popko	7^{7}	6
4	(Kazakhstan) T Khabibulin (Belarus) D Zhyrmont	6^{1}	4
(Russia) E Karlovskiy (Russia) E Tyurnev	3	6	[10]
2	(Ukraine) V Manafov (Belarus) Y Shyla	6	4	[6]

Semifinals
1	(Japan) T Matsui (India) V Vardhan	7^{7}	7^{7}
(France) S Doumbia (Czech Republic) M Konečný	6^{5}	6^{1}
(Kazakhstan) A Golubev (Kazakhstan) D Popko	3	2
(Russia) E Karlovskiy (Russia) E Tyurnev	6	6

Final
1	(Japan) T Matsui (India) V Vardhan	7^{7}	6^{5}	[10]
(Russia) E Karlovskiy (Russia) E Tyurnev	6^{3}	7^{7}	[7]
