= 2017 President's Cup – Women's singles =

Women's singles
- 2017 President's Cup (tennis)

Final
- Champion: (China) Zhang Shuai
- Runner-up: (Belgium) Ysaline Bonaventure
- Score: 6–3, 6–4

Events
Singles	men	women
Doubles	men	women
- President's Cup (tennis)

Alyona Sotnikova was the defending champion, but chose not to participate.

Zhang Shuai won the title, defeating Ysaline Bonaventure in the final, 6–3, 6–4.

== Seeds ==
1. (China) Zhang Shuai (champion)
2. (United Kingdom) Naomi Broady (semifinals)
3. (Russia) Veronika Kudermetova (semifinals)
4. (Russia) Polina Monova (second round)
5. (Czech Republic) Marie Bouzková (semifinals)
6. (United Kingdom) Tara Moore (first round)
7. (Russia) Alla Kudryavtseva (first round)
8. (Russia) Varvara Flink (second round)

== Draw ==
Key

- Q = Qualifier
- WC = Wild card
- LL = Lucky loser
- Alt = Alternate
- ITF = ITF entry
- PR = Protected ranking
- SR = Special ranking
- SE = Special exempt
- JE = Junior exempt
- JR = Junior Accelerator Programme entrant
- CO = College Accelerator Programme entrant
- NG = Next Gen Accelerator Program entrant
- w/o = Walkover
- r = Retired
- d = Defaulted

=== Finals ===
Semifinals
1	(China) Zhang Shuai	6	6
(Germany) Vivian Heisen	2	1
(Russia) Natela Dzalamidze	2	1
(Belgium) Ysaline Bonaventure	6	6

Final
1	(China) Zhang Shuai	6	6
(Belgium) Ysaline Bonaventure	3	4

=== Top half ===
First round
1	(China) S Zhang	6	6
(Russia) A Frolova	0	2
Q	(Russia) V Urzhumova	2	6	3
(Ukraine) O Ianchuk	6	3	6
Q	(Russia) V Zeleva	6	6
(Russia) O Puchkova	3	3
(Kazakhstan) G Ainitdinova	2	0
5	(Czech Republic) M Bouzková	6	6
4	(Russia) P Monova	6	6
(Ukraine) L Kichenok	2	2
LL	(Serbia) N Kostić	7	6
(Japan) K Okamura	5	4
(Kazakhstan) K Kerimbayeva	6	6
Q	(Kyrgyzstan) K Palkina	4	3
(Germany) V Heisen	1	7	7^{7}
7	(Russia) A Kudryavtseva	6	5	6^{5}

Second round
1	(China) S Zhang	6	6
(Ukraine) O Ianchuk	1	3
Q	(Russia) V Zeleva	2	5
5	(Czech Republic) M Bouzková	6	7
4	(Russia) P Monova	6	4	3
LL	(Serbia) N Kostić	3	6	6
(Kazakhstan) K Kerimbayeva	2	6	1
(Germany) V Heisen	6	4	6

Quarterfinals
1	(China) S Zhang	6	6
5	(Czech Republic) M Bouzková	4	3
LL	(Serbia) N Kostić	4	3
(Germany) V Heisen	6	6

Semifinals
1	(China) S Zhang	6	6
(Germany) V Heisen	2	1

=== Bottom half ===
First round
8	(Russia) V Flink	6	5	6
PR	(Russia) V Diatchenko	1	7	2
WC	(Kazakhstan) Z Kulambayeva	4	2
(Russia) N Dzalamidze	6	6
WC	(Kazakhstan) D Detkovskaya	2	7^{7}	2
(Russia) E Kazionova	6	6^{4}	6
(United Kingdom) H Dart	3	4
3	(Russia) V Kudermetova	6	6
6	(United Kingdom) T Moore	4	4
WC	(Kazakhstan) A Danilina	6	6
(Belgium) Y Bonaventure	6	6
Q	(Ukraine) V Kapshay	1	3
(Israel) V Ekshibarova	6	6
WC	(Kazakhstan) Y Dmitrichenko	3	2
(Russia) Y Sizikova	6^{1}	2
2	(United Kingdom) N Broady	7^{7}	6

Second round
8	(Russia) V Flink	5	4
(Russia) N Dzalamidze	7	6
(Russia) E Kazionova	2	2
3	(Russia) V Kudermetova	6	6
WC	(Kazakhstan) A Danilina	5	4
(Belgium) Y Bonaventure	7	6
(Israel) V Ekshibarova	6	6^{5}	3
2	(United Kingdom) N Broady	4	7^{7}	6

Quarterfinals
(Russia) N Dzalamidze	6	6
3	(Russia) V Kudermetova	3	3
(Belgium) Y Bonaventure	6	6
2	(United Kingdom) N Broady	4	3

Semifinals
(Russia) N Dzalamidze	2	1
(Belgium) Y Bonaventure	6	6
