= 2017 Aircel Chennai Open – Singles =

Singles
- 2017 Aircel Chennai Open

Final
- Champion: (Spain) Roberto Bautista Agut
- Runner-up: (Russia) Daniil Medvedev
- Score: 6–3, 6–4

Details
- Draw: 28 (4 Q / 3 WC )
- Seeds: 8

Events
Singles	Doubles
← 2016 ·	Maharashtra Open	· 2018 →

Stan Wawrinka was the three-time defending champion, but chose to compete in Brisbane instead.

Roberto Bautista Agut won the title, defeating Daniil Medvedev in the final, 6–3, 6–4.

== Seeds ==
The top four seeds received a bye into the second round.

1. (Croatia) Marin Čilić (second round)
2. (Spain) Roberto Bautista Agut (champion)
3. (Spain) Albert Ramos Viñolas (quarterfinals)
4. (Slovakia) Martin Kližan (second round)
5. (France) Benoît Paire (semifinals)
6. (Croatia) Borna Ćorić (first round)
7. (Russia) Mikhail Youzhny (quarterfinals)
8. (Chinese Taipei) Lu Yen-hsun (second round)

== Draw ==
=== Finals ===
Semifinals
(Russia) Daniil Medvedev	4	7^{7}	6
(Israel) Dudi Sela	6	6^{2}	2
5	(France) Benoît Paire	3	3
2	(Spain) Roberto Bautista Agut	6	6

Final
(Russia) Daniil Medvedev	3	4
2	(Spain) Roberto Bautista Agut	6	6

=== Top half ===
First round
Q	(Slovakia) J Kovalík	6^{5}	6	6
(Portugal) G Elias	7^{7}	4	2
(Brazil) T Monteiro	3	3
(Russia) D Medvedev	6	6
(Moldova) R Albot	2	1
8	(Chinese Taipei) Y-h Lu	6	6
(Belgium) S Darcis	6	6
Q	(Croatia) N Mektić	2	3
(Bosnia and Herzegovina) D Džumhur	2	2
(Israel) D Sela	6	6
Q	(South Korea) H Chung	6	7
6	(Croatia) B Ćorić	3	5

Second round
1	(Croatia) M Čilić	6^{5}	7	5
Q	(Slovakia) J Kovalík	7^{7}	5	7
(Russia) D Medvedev	6	6
8	(Chinese Taipei) Y-h Lu	4	3
3	(Spain) A Ramos Viñolas	6	6
(Belgium) S Darcis	2	0
(Israel) D Sela	6	6
Q	(South Korea) H Chung	2	2

Quarterfinals
Q	(Slovakia) J Kovalík	1	4
(Russia) D Medvedev	6	6
3	(Spain) A Ramos Viñolas	5	4
(Israel) D Sela	7	6

Semifinals
(Russia) D Medvedev	4	7^{7}	6
(Israel) D Sela	6	6^{2}	2

=== Bottom half ===
First round
5	(France) B Paire	6	6
(Russia) K Kravchuk	3	4
WC	(India) R Ramanathan	1	1
Q	(India) Y Bhambri	6	6
(United Kingdom) A Bedene	6	6
(Spain) G García López	3	3
7	(Russia) M Youzhny	6	6
WC	(India) S Myneni	4	3
(Argentina) R Olivo	7^{7}	6
WC	(Norway) C Ruud	6^{3}	2
(Brazil) R Dutra Silva	7^{7}	4	7^{7}
(Serbia) D Lajović	6^{2}	6	6^{3}

Second round
5	(France) B Paire	6	6
Q	(India) Y Bhambri	3	4
(United Kingdom) A Bedene	7^{7}	6^{3}	7^{7}
4	(Slovakia) M Kližan	6^{3}	7^{7}	6^{2}
7	(Russia) M Youzhny	6	7
(Argentina) R Olivo	1	5
(Brazil) R Dutra Silva	3	2
2	(Spain) R Bautista Agut	6	6

Quarterfinals
5	(France) B Paire	6	6
(United Kingdom) A Bedene	3	0
7	(Russia) M Youzhny	6	4	4
2	(Spain) R Bautista Agut	2	6	6

Semifinals
5	(France) B Paire	3	3
2	(Spain) R Bautista Agut	6	6

== Qualifying ==
=== Seeds ===
1. (South Korea) Chung Hyeon (qualified)
2. (Argentina) Nicolás Kicker (qualifying competition)
3. (Slovakia) Jozef Kovalík (qualified)
4. (Argentina) Marco Trungelliti (qualifying competition)
5. (Canada) Steven Diez (first round)
6. (Japan) Hiroki Moriya (first round)
7. (Italy) Federico Gaio (first round)
8. (Italy) Marco Cecchinato (first round)

=== Qualifiers ===
1. (South Korea) Chung Hyeon
2. (India) Yuki Bhambri
3. (Slovakia) Jozef Kovalík
4. (Croatia) Nikola Mektić

=== Qualifying draw ===
==== First qualifier ====
First round
1	(South Korea) Chung Hyeon	6	6
(Serbia) Miljan Zekić	1	3
PR	(Austria) Jürgen Melzer	6	6
5	(Canada) Steven Diez	1	1

Qualifying competition
1	(South Korea) Chung Hyeon	6	7^{7}
PR	(Austria) Jürgen Melzer	0	6^{4}

==== Second qualifier ====
First round
2	(Argentina) Nicolás Kicker	6^{5}	6	7
WC	(India) Sasikumar Mukund	7^{7}	3	5
WC	(India) Yuki Bhambri	7	6
8	(Italy) Marco Cecchinato	5	1

Qualifying competition
2	(Argentina) Nicolás Kicker	3	1
WC	(India) Yuki Bhambri	6	6

==== Third qualifier ====
First round
3	(Slovakia) Jozef Kovalík	6	6
(Croatia) Franko Škugor	3	4
(India) Prajnesh Gunneswaran	6	6
6	(Japan) Hiroki Moriya	2	3

Qualifying competition
3	(Slovakia) Jozef Kovalík	7^{7}	6
(India) Prajnesh Gunneswaran	6^{2}	2

==== Fourth qualifier ====
First round
4	(Argentina) Marco Trungelliti	6	6
(Italy) Alessandro Bega	0	4
Alt	(Croatia) Nikola Mektić	6	6
7	(Italy) Federico Gaio	3	0

Qualifying competition
4	(Argentina) Marco Trungelliti	5	2
Alt	(Croatia) Nikola Mektić	7	6
