= 2017 Aircel Chennai Open – Doubles =

Doubles
- 2017 Aircel Chennai Open

Final
- Champions: (India) Rohan Bopanna (India) Jeevan Nedunchezhiyan
- Runners-up: (India) Purav Raja (India) Divij Sharan
- Score: 6–3, 6–4

Details
- Draw: 16
- Seeds: 4

Events
| Singles | Doubles |
| ← 2016 · | Maharashtra Open | · 2018 → |

Oliver Marach and Fabrice Martin were the defending champions, but Marach chose not to participate this year and Martin chose to compete in Doha instead.

Rohan Bopanna and Jeevan Nedunchezhiyan won the title, defeating Purav Raja and Divij Sharan in the final, 6–3, 6–4.

== Seeds ==
1. (Israel) Jonathan Erlich / (United States) Scott Lipsky (first round)
2. (Argentina) Guillermo Durán / (Argentina) Andrés Molteni (semifinals)
3. (India) Leander Paes / (Brazil) André Sá (first round)
4. (United States) Nicholas Monroe / (New Zealand) Artem Sitak (semifinals)

== Draw ==
=== Key ===
- Q = Qualifier
- WC = Wild card
- LL = Lucky loser
- Alt = Alternate
- SE = Special exempt
- PR = Protected ranking
- ITF = ITF entry
- JE = Junior exempt
- w/o = Walkover
- r = Retired
- d = Defaulted
- SR = Special ranking

First round
1 | (Israel) J Erlich (United States) S Lipsky | 4 | 6 | [8]
(United States) J Cerretani (Austria) P Oswald | 6 | 1 | [10]
(Brazil) M Demoliner (Croatia) N Mektić | 4 | 4
(India) R Bopanna (India) J Nedunchezhiyan | 6 | 6
4 | (United States) N Monroe (New Zealand) A Sitak | 7^{7} | 6
(Russia) K Kravchuk (Russia) M Youzhny | 6^{5} | 3
WC | (India) S Myneni (India) R Ramanathan | 4 | 6 | [8]
(Belgium) S Darcis (France) B Paire | 6 | 0 | [10]
PR | (Germany) A Begemann (Chinese Taipei) Y-h Lu | 6 | 6^{3} | [9]
PR | (Austria) J Melzer (Argentina) R Olivo | 4 | 7^{7} | [11]
(India) P Raja (India) D Sharan | 6 | 6
3 | (India) L Paes (Brazil) A Sá | 4 | 4
(Sweden) J Brunström (Sweden) A Siljeström | 6 | 6
WC | (India) S Balaji (India) V Vardhan | 2 | 4
(Netherlands) W Koolhof (Netherlands) M Middelkoop | 6^{4} | 4
2 | (Argentina) G Durán (Argentina) A Molteni | 7^{7} | 6

Quarterfinals
(United States) J Cerretani (Austria) P Oswald | 2 | 6 | [10]
(India) R Bopanna (India) J Nedunchezhiyan | 6 | 3 | [12]
4 | (United States) N Monroe (New Zealand) A Sitak | 5
(Belgium) S Darcis (France) B Paire | 0^{r}
PR | (Austria) J Melzer (Argentina) R Olivo | 4 | 5
(India) P Raja (India) D Sharan | 6 | 7
(Sweden) J Brunström (Sweden) A Siljeström | 5 | 6^{5}
2 | (Argentina) G Durán (Argentina) A Molteni | 7 | 7^{7}

Semifinals
(India) R Bopanna (India) J Nedunchezhiyan | 7^{7} | 6
4 | (United States) N Monroe (New Zealand) A Sitak | 6^{4} | 4
(India) P Raja (India) D Sharan | 6 | 6
2 | (Argentina) G Durán (Argentina) A Molteni | 4 | 2

Final
(India) R Bopanna (India) J Nedunchezhiyan | 6 | 6
(India) P Raja (India) D Sharan | 3 | 4
