= 2015 Aircel Chennai Open =

- Date: 5–11 January 2015
- Edition: 20th
- Draw: 28S / 16D
- Prize money: USD403,495
- Surface: Hard / outdoor
- Location: Chennai, India
- Venue: SDAT Tennis Stadium

Champions

Singles
- (Switzerland) Stan Wawrinka

Doubles
- (Chinese Taipei) Lu Yen-hsun / (United Kingdom) Jonathan Marray
- Maharashtra Open

The 2015 Aircel Chennai Open was a men's 2015 ATP World Tour tennis tournament, played on outdoor hard courts. It was the 20th edition of the only ATP tournament taking place in India and took place at the SDAT Tennis Stadium in Chennai, India, from 5 January through 11 January 2015. Firsts-seeded Stan Wawrinka won the singles title.

== Finals ==
=== Singles ===
- (Switzerland) Stan Wawrinka defeated (Slovenia) Aljaž Bedene, 6–3, 6–4

=== Doubles ===
- (Chinese Taipei) Lu Yen-hsun / (United Kingdom) Jonathan Marray defeated (South Africa) Raven Klaasen / (India) Leander Paes, 6–3, 7–6^{(7–4)}

== Points and prize money ==
=== Point distribution ===
Event	W	F	SF	QF	Round of 16	Round of 32	Q	Q3	Q2	Q1
Singles	250	150	90	45	20	0	12	6	0	0
Doubles	250	150	90	45	0	—N/a	—N/a	—N/a	—N/a	—N/a

=== Prize money ===
Event	W	F	SF	QF	Round of 16	Round of 32	Q3	Q2	Q1
Singles	$72,490	$38,180	$20,680	$11,785	$6,940	$4,115	$665	$320	—N/a
Doubles*	$22,020	$11,580	$6,270	$3,590	$2,100	—N/a	—N/a	—N/a	—N/a

_{*per team}

== Singles main-draw entrants ==
=== Seeds ===
Country	Player	Rank^{1}	Seed
SUI	Stan Wawrinka	4	1
ESP	Feliciano López	14	2
ESP	Roberto Bautista Agut	15	3
BEL	David Goffin	22	4
ESP	Guillermo García López	36	5
TPE	Lu Yen-hsun	38	6
ESP	Marcel Granollers	46	7
LUX	Gilles Müller	47	8

- ^{1} Rankings as of 29 December 2014

=== Other entrants ===
The following players received wildcards into the singles main draw:

- (India) Somdev Devvarman
- (India) Ramkumar Ramanathan
- (Sweden) Elias Ymer

The following players received entry from the qualifying draw:

- (Slovenia) Aljaž Bedene
- (Russia) Evgeny Donskoy
- (India) N Vijay Sundar Prashanth
- (Italy) Luca Vanni

=== Retirements ===
- (Spain) Marcel Granollers (knee injury)

== Doubles main-draw entrants ==
=== Seeds ===
Country	Player	Country	Player	Rank^{1}	Seed
RSA	Raven Klaasen	IND	Leander Paes	49	1
GER	Andre Begemann	NED	Robin Haase	86	2
SWE	Johan Brunström	USA	Nicholas Monroe	120	3
AUT	Oliver Marach	NZL	Michael Venus	129	4

- ^{1} Rankings as of 29 December 2014

=== Other entrants ===
The following pairs received wildcards into the doubles main draw:

- (India) Sriram Balaji / (India) Jeevan Nedunchezhiyan
- (India) Mahesh Bhupathi / (India) Saketh Myneni

The following pair received entry as alternates:

- (India) Chandril Sood / (India) Lakshit Sood

=== Withdrawals ===
Before the tournament

- (Colombia) Alejandro González (shoulder injury)
