= 2017 President's Cup (tennis) =

- Date: 17–23 July
- Edition: 12th (men); 9th (women)
- Category: ATP Challenger Tour; ITF Women's Circuit
- Prize money: $125,000+H (men) $100,000+H (women)
- Surface: Hard
- Location: Astana, Kazakhstan

Champions

Men's singles
- (Belarus) Egor Gerasimov

Women's singles
- (China) Zhang Shuai

Men's doubles
- (Japan) Toshihide Matsui / (India) Vishnu Vardhan

Women's doubles
- (Russia) Natela Dzalamidze / (Russia) Veronika Kudermetova
- President's Cup (tennis)

The 2017 President's Cup was a professional tennis tournament played on outdoor hard courts. It was the twelfth (men) and ninth (women) editions of the tournament and was part of the 2017 ATP Challenger Tour and the 2017 ITF Women's Circuit. It took place in Astana, Kazakhstan, on 17–23 July 2017.

== Men's singles main draw entrants ==
=== Seeds ===
Country	Player	Rank^{1}	Seed
RUS	Evgeny Donskoy	98	1
KAZ	Mikhail Kukushkin	118	2
KAZ	Alexander Bublik	135	3
KOR	Lee Duck-hee	147	4
BLR	Egor Gerasimov	166	5
SRB	Nikola Milojević	177	6
KOR	Kwon Soon-woo	194	7
BIH	Aldin Šetkić	201	8

- ^{1} Rankings as of 3 July 2017.

=== Other entrants ===
The following players received a wildcard into the singles main draw:

- (Kazakhstan) Andrey Golubev
- (Kazakhstan) Roman Khassanov
- (Kazakhstan) Grigoriy Lomakin
- (Kazakhstan) Denis Yevseyev

The following player received entry into the singles main draw using a protected ranking:

- (Uzbekistan) Farrukh Dustov

The following players received entry from the qualifying draw:

- (France) Hugo Grenier
- (Russia) Evgeny Karlovskiy
- (India) Saketh Myneni
- (Russia) Evgeny Tyurnev

== Women's singles main draw entrants ==
=== Seeds ===
Country	Player	Rank^{1}	Seed
CHN	Zhang Shuai	31	1
GBR	Naomi Broady	109	2
RUS	Veronika Kudermetova	187	3
RUS	Polina Monova	192	4
CZE	Marie Bouzková	212	5
GBR	Tara Moore	217	6
RUS	Alla Kudryavtseva	226	7
RUS	Varvara Flink	259	8

- ^{1} Rankings as of 3 July 2017.

=== Other entrants ===
The following players received a wildcard into the singles main draw:

- (Kazakhstan) Anna Danilina
- (Kazakhstan) Dariya Detkovskaya
- (Kazakhstan) Yekaterina Dmitrichenko
- (Kazakhstan) Zhibek Kulambayeva

The following player received entry by a protected ranking:

- (Russia) Vitalia Diatchenko

The following players received entry from the qualifying draw:

- (Ukraine) Veronika Kapshay
- (Kyrgyzstan) Ksenia Palkina
- (Russia) Valeriya Urzhumova
- (Russia) Valeriya Zeleva

The following player received entry as a lucky loser:

- (Serbia) Natalija Kostić

== Champions ==
=== Men's singles ===
- (Belarus) Egor Gerasimov def. (Kazakhstan) Mikhail Kukushkin, 7–6^{(11–9)}, 4–6, 6–4

=== Women's singles ===
- (China) Zhang Shuai def. (Belgium) Ysaline Bonaventure, 6–3, 6–4

=== Men's doubles ===
- (Japan) Toshihide Matsui / (India) Vishnu Vardhan def. (Russia) Evgeny Karlovskiy / (Russia) Evgeny Tyurnev, 7–6^{(7–3)}, 6–7^{(5–7)}, [10–7]

=== Women's doubles ===
- (Russia) Natela Dzalamidze / (Russia) Veronika Kudermetova def. (Belgium) Ysaline Bonaventure / (United Kingdom) Naomi Broady, 6–2, 6–0
