= 2016 Aircel Chennai Open =

- Date: 4–10 January 2016
- Edition: 21st
- Category: World Tour 250
- Draw: 28S / 16D
- Prize money: $425,535
- Surface: Hard / outdoors
- Location: Chennai, India
- Venue: SDAT Tennis Stadium

Champions

Singles
- (Switzerland) Stan Wawrinka

Doubles
- (Austria) Oliver Marach / (France) Fabrice Martin
← 2015 ·	Maharashtra Open	· 2017 →

The 2016 Aircel Chennai Open was a men's tennis tournament, played on outdoor hard courts that was part of the ATP World Tour 250 series of the 2016 ATP World Tour. It was the 21st edition of the only ATP tournament taking place in India and was played at the SDAT Tennis Stadium in Chennai, from 4 January until 10 January 2016. First-seeded Stan Wawrinka won the singles event.

== Finals ==
=== Singles ===
- (Switzerland) Stan Wawrinka defeated (Croatia) Borna Ćorić, 6–3, 7–5

=== Doubles ===
- (Austria) Oliver Marach / (France) Fabrice Martin defeated (United States) Austin Krajicek / (France) Benoît Paire, 6–3, 7–5

== Points and prize money ==
=== Point distribution ===
Event	W	F	SF	QF	Round of 16	Round of 32	Q	Q2	Q1
Singles	250	150	90	45	20	0	12	6	0
Doubles	250	150	90	45	0	—	—	—	—

=== Prize money ===
Event	W	F	SF	QF	Round of 16	Round of 32	Q2	Q1
Singles	$75,700	$39,870	$21,600	$12,300	$7,250	$4,295	$1,935	$970
Doubles	$23,000	$12,090	$6,550	$3,750	$2,200	—	—	—
Doubles prize money per team

== Singles main-draw entrants ==
=== Seeds ===
Country	Player	Rank^{1}	Seed
SUI	Stan Wawrinka	4	1
~~RSA~~	~~Kevin Anderson~~	~~12~~	~~2~~
FRA	Benoît Paire	19	3
ESP	Roberto Bautista Agut	25	4
ESP	Guillermo García López	27	5
LUX	Gilles Müller	38	6
CAN	Vasek Pospisil	39	7
CRO	Borna Ćorić	44	8

- ^{1} Rankings as of 28 December 2015

=== Other entrants ===
The following players received wildcards into the singles main draw:

- (Russia) Karen Khachanov
- (India) Ramkumar Ramanathan
- (Russia) Andrey Rublev

The following players received entry from the qualifying draw:

- (India) Somdev Devvarman
- (Italy) Thomas Fabbiano
- (Slovakia) Jozef Kovalík
- (Croatia) Ante Pavić

The following player received entry as a lucky loser:

- (Russia) Alexander Kudryavtsev

=== Withdrawals ===
Before the tournament

- (India) Yuki Bhambri →replaced by (Spain) Daniel Gimeno Traver
- (Austria) Andreas Haider-Maurer →replaced by (United States) Austin Krajicek
- (Chinese Taipei) Lu Yen-hsun →replaced by (Germany) Jan-Lennard Struff
- (Serbia) Janko Tipsarević →replaced by (Italy) Luca Vanni
- (South Africa) Kevin Anderson (late withdrawal) →replaced by (Russia) Alexander Kudryavtsev

== Doubles main-draw entrants ==
=== Seeds ===
Country	Player	Country	Player	Rank^{1}	Seed
RSA	Raven Klaasen	USA	Rajeev Ram	56	1
ESP	Marcel Granollers	IND	Leander Paes	80	2
AUT	Oliver Marach	FRA	Fabrice Martin	119	3
NZL	Marcus Daniell	NZL	Artem Sitak	119	4

- ^{1} Rankings as of 28 December 2015

=== Other entrants ===
The following pairs received wildcards into the doubles main draw:

- (India) Sriram Balaji / (India) Ramkumar Ramanathan
- (India) Somdev Devvarman / (India) Jeevan Nedunchezhiyan

The following pair received entry as alternates:

- (Japan) Taro Daniel / (Australia) John Millman

=== Withdrawals ===
Before the tournament

- (Spain) Guillermo García López (right calf injury)

During the tournament

- (Spain) Marcel Granollers (illness)
