= 2017 Aircel Chennai Open =

- Date: 2–8 January 2017
- Edition: 22nd
- Category: World Tour 250
- Draw: 28S / 16D
- Prize money: $447,480
- Surface: Hard
- Location: Chennai, India
- Venue: SDAT Tennis Stadium

Champions

Singles
- (Spain) Roberto Bautista Agut

Doubles
- (India) Rohan Bopanna / (India) Jeevan Nedunchezhiyan
← 2016 ·	Maharashtra Open	· 2018 →

The 2017 Aircel Chennai Open was a 2017 ATP World Tour men's tennis tournament played on outdoor hard courts. It was the 22nd edition of the only ATP tournament taking place in India and took place at the SDAT Tennis Stadium in Chennai, from 2 January through 8 January 2017. It was the last edition of the Chennai Open before it moved to Pune, Maharashtra and was renamed the Maharashtra Open. Second-seeded Roberto Bautista Agut won the singles title.

== Finals ==
=== Singles ===
- (Spain) Roberto Bautista Agut defeated (Russia) Daniil Medvedev, 6–3, 6–4

=== Doubles ===
- (India) Rohan Bopanna / (India) Jeevan Nedunchezhiyan defeated (India) Purav Raja / (India) Divij Sharan, 6–3, 6–4

== Points and prize money ==
=== Point distribution ===
Event	W	F	SF	QF	Round of 16	Round of 32	Q	Q2	Q1
Singles	250	150	90	45	20	0	12	6	0
Doubles	250	150	90	45	0	—	—	—	—

=== Prize money ===
Event	W	F	SF	QF	Round of 16	Round of 32	Q2	Q1
Singles	$79,780	$42,020	$22,765	$12,970	$7,640	$4,525	$2,040	$1,020
Doubles	$24,240	$12,740	$6,910	$3,950	$2,310	—	—	—
Doubles prize money per team

== Singles main-draw entrants ==
=== Seeds ===
Country	Player	Rank^{1}	Seed
CRO	Marin Čilić	6	1
ESP	Roberto Bautista Agut	14	2
ESP	Albert Ramos Viñolas	27	3
SVK	Martin Kližan	35	4
FRA	Benoît Paire	47	5
CRO	Borna Ćorić	48	6
RUS	Mikhail Youzhny	57	7
TPE	Lu Yen-hsun	64	8

- ^{1} Rankings as of 26 December 2016

=== Other entrants ===
The following players received wildcards into the singles main draw:

- (India) Saketh Myneni
- (India) Ramkumar Ramanathan
- (Norway) Casper Ruud

The following players received entry from the qualifying draw:

- (India) Yuki Bhambri
- (South Korea) Chung Hyeon
- (Slovakia) Jozef Kovalík
- (Croatia) Nikola Mektić

=== Withdrawals ===
Before the tournament

- (Spain) Tommy Robredo →replaced by (United Kingdom) Aljaž Bedene

== Doubles main-draw entrants ==
=== Seeds ===
Country	Player	Country	Player	Rank^{1}	Seed
ISR	Jonathan Erlich	USA	Scott Lipsky	99	1
ARG	Guillermo Durán	ARG	Andrés Molteni	111	2
IND	Leander Paes	BRA	André Sá	112	3
USA	Nicholas Monroe	NZL	Artem Sitak	114	4

- ^{1} Rankings as of 26 December 2016

=== Other entrants ===
The following pairs received wildcards into the doubles main draw:

- (India) Sriram Balaji / (India) Vishnu Vardhan
- (India) Saketh Myneni / (India) Ramkumar Ramanathan
