= 2017 President's Cup – Women's doubles =

Women's doubles
- 2017 President's Cup (tennis)

Final
- Champion: (Russia) Natela Dzalamidze (Russia) Veronika Kudermetova
- Runner-up: (Belgium) Ysaline Bonaventure (United Kingdom) Naomi Broady
- Score: 6–2, 6–0

Events
Singles	men	women
Doubles	men	women
- President's Cup (tennis)

Natela Dzalamidze and Veronika Kudermetova were the defending champions and they were able to successfully defend their title, defeating Ysaline Bonaventure and Naomi Broady in the final, 6–2, 6–0.

== Seeds ==
1. (Ukraine) Lyudmyla Kichenok / (Russia) Alla Kudryavtseva (semifinals)
2. (Russia) Natela Dzalamidze / (Russia) Veronika Kudermetova (champions)
3. (Russia) Polina Monova / (Russia) Yana Sizikova (semifinals)
4. (Germany) Vivian Heisen / (Russia) Ekaterina Yashina (quarterfinals)

== Draw ==
Key

- Q = Qualifier
- WC = Wild card
- LL = Lucky loser
- Alt = Alternate
- ITF = ITF entry
- PR = Protected ranking
- SR = Special ranking
- SE = Special exempt
- JE = Junior exempt
- JR = Junior Accelerator Programme entrant
- CO = College Accelerator Programme entrant
- NG = Next Gen Accelerator Program entrant
- w/o = Walkover
- r = Retired
- d = Defaulted

First round
1	(Ukraine) L Kichenok (Russia) A Kudryavtseva	7	6
(Russia) A Frolova (Kazakhstan) K Kerimbayeva	5	1
(Ukraine) V Kapshay (Japan) K Okamura	4	6	[12]
(Kazakhstan) G Ainitdinova (Israel) V Ekshibarova	6	1	[10]
4	(Germany) V Heisen (Russia) E Yashina	7	6
WC	(Belarus) E Alexandrova (Kazakhstan) Z Kulambayeva	5	3
(United Kingdom) H Dart (United Kingdom) T Moore	1	6^{4}
(Belgium) Y Bonaventure (United Kingdom) N Broady	6	7^{7}
WC	(Kazakhstan) P Goloputova (Kazakhstan) A Taluyenko	3	4
(Uzbekistan) A Folts (Germany) L-M Mätschke	6	6
Alt	(Russia) P Golubovskaya (Russia) V Zeleva	2	4
3	(Russia) P Monova (Russia) Y Sizikova	6	6
(Switzerland) K Kennel (Kyrgyzstan) K Palkina	1	2
(Russia) E Kazionova (Serbia) N Kostić	6	6
WC	(Kazakhstan) A Danilina (Ukraine) O Ianchuk	4	3
2	(Russia) N Dzalamidze (Russia) V Kudermetova	6	6

Quarterfinals
1	(Ukraine) L Kichenok (Russia) A Kudryavtseva	6	6
(Ukraine) V Kapshay (Japan) K Okamura	3	2
4	(Germany) V Heisen (Russia) E Yashina	4	2
(Belgium) Y Bonaventure (United Kingdom) N Broady	6	6
(Uzbekistan) A Folts (Germany) L-M Mätschke	4	2
3	(Russia) P Monova (Russia) Y Sizikova	6	6
(Russia) E Kazionova (Serbia) N Kostić	1	3
2	(Russia) N Dzalamidze (Russia) V Kudermetova	6	6

Semifinals
1	(Ukraine) L Kichenok (Russia) A Kudryavtseva	2	7^{8}	[5]
(Belgium) Y Bonaventure (United Kingdom) N Broady	6	6^{6}	[10]
3	(Russia) P Monova (Russia) Y Sizikova	4	4
2	(Russia) N Dzalamidze (Russia) V Kudermetova	6	6

Final
(Belgium) Y Bonaventure (United Kingdom) N Broady	2	0
2	(Russia) N Dzalamidze (Russia) V Kudermetova	6	6
