= Sem Verbeek =

Dutch tennis player (born 1994)

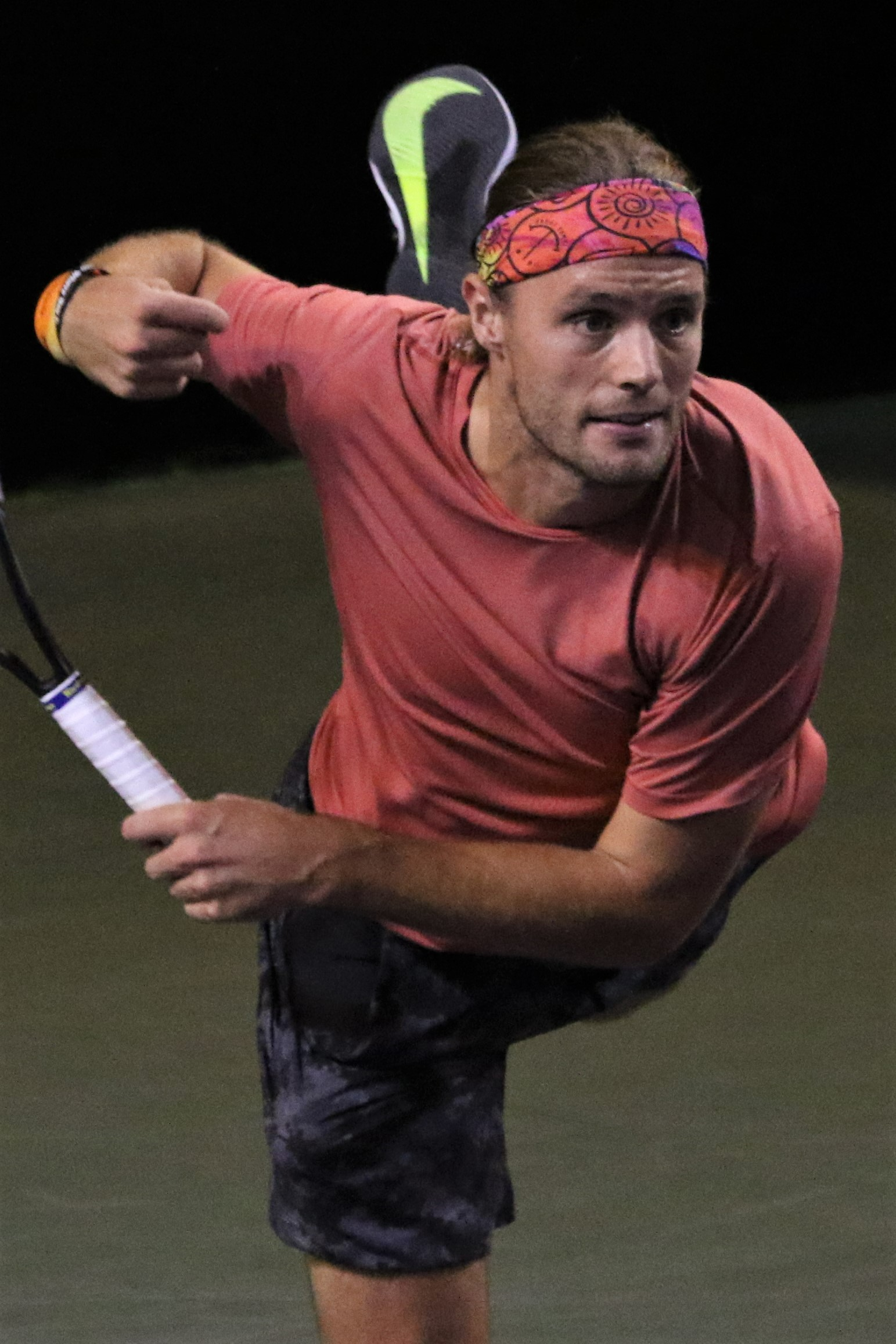
- Country (sports): Netherlands
- Born: 12 April 1994 (age 32) Amsterdam, Netherlands
- Height: 1.93 m (6 ft 4 in)
- Plays: Left-handed (two-handed backhand)
- College: University of the Pacific
- Prize money: $699,244

Singles
- Career record: 0–0
- Highest ranking: No. 531 (15 April 2019)

Doubles
- Career record: 43–48
- Career titles: 2
- Highest ranking: No. 29 (19 May 2025)
- Current ranking: No. 60 (2 March 2026)

Grand Slam doubles results
- Australian Open: SF (2025)
- French Open: 2R (2025)
- Wimbledon: 3R (2026)
- US Open: 2R (2024, 2026)

Mixed doubles
- Career titles: 1

Grand Slam mixed doubles results
- Australian Open: QF (2026)
- French Open: 1R (2025)
- Wimbledon: W (2025)
- Last updated on: 16 March 2026.

Sem Verbeek (born 12 April 1994) is a Dutch professional tennis player who specializes in doubles. He has a career high ATP doubles ranking of World No. 29 achieved on 19 May 2025. In 2025, Verbeek won the mixed doubles title at Wimbledon with Kateřina Siniaková. He is the current No. 5 Dutch doubles player. He also has a career-high in singles of No. 531 achieved on 15 April 2019.

== Career ==
=== 2012–2016: College years ===
He played NCAA Division I college tennis at the University of the Pacific in Stockton, California from 2012 to 2016.

=== 2018–2023: First ATP final ===
Verbeek won his first ATP Challenger doubles title at the 2018 Winnipeg National Bank Challenger with Marc-Andrea Hüsler.

In July 2021 he reached his first ATP final at the 2021 Los Cabos Open partnering with Hunter Reese.

=== 2024: Top 100, Masters, Major debuts and first wins, ATP title ===
He reached the top 100 in the doubles rankings at world No. 98 on 5 February 2024. In March, ranked No. 89 at the 2024 Miami Open he reached the quarterfinals with John-Patrick Smith as an alternate pair. As a result, he improved his best ranking climbing more than 15 positions up into the top 75 at world No. 73 on 1 April 2024.

He made his Grand Slam main draw debut at the 2024 French Open partnering Reese Stalder as an alternate pair. He recorded his first Major win at the 2024 Wimbledon Championships with Romain Arneodo as an alternate pair.

He won his first ATP title with André Göransson at the 2024 Hall of Fame Open. As a result, he improved his best ranking climbing 11 positions up into the top 60 on 22 July 2024. Verbeek also competed for the first time in the main draw of the 2024 US Open with Göransson, his third Grand Slam appearance of the season after playing in the French Open and Wimbledon.

=== 2025: Grand Slam doubles semifinal and mixed title, top 30 ===
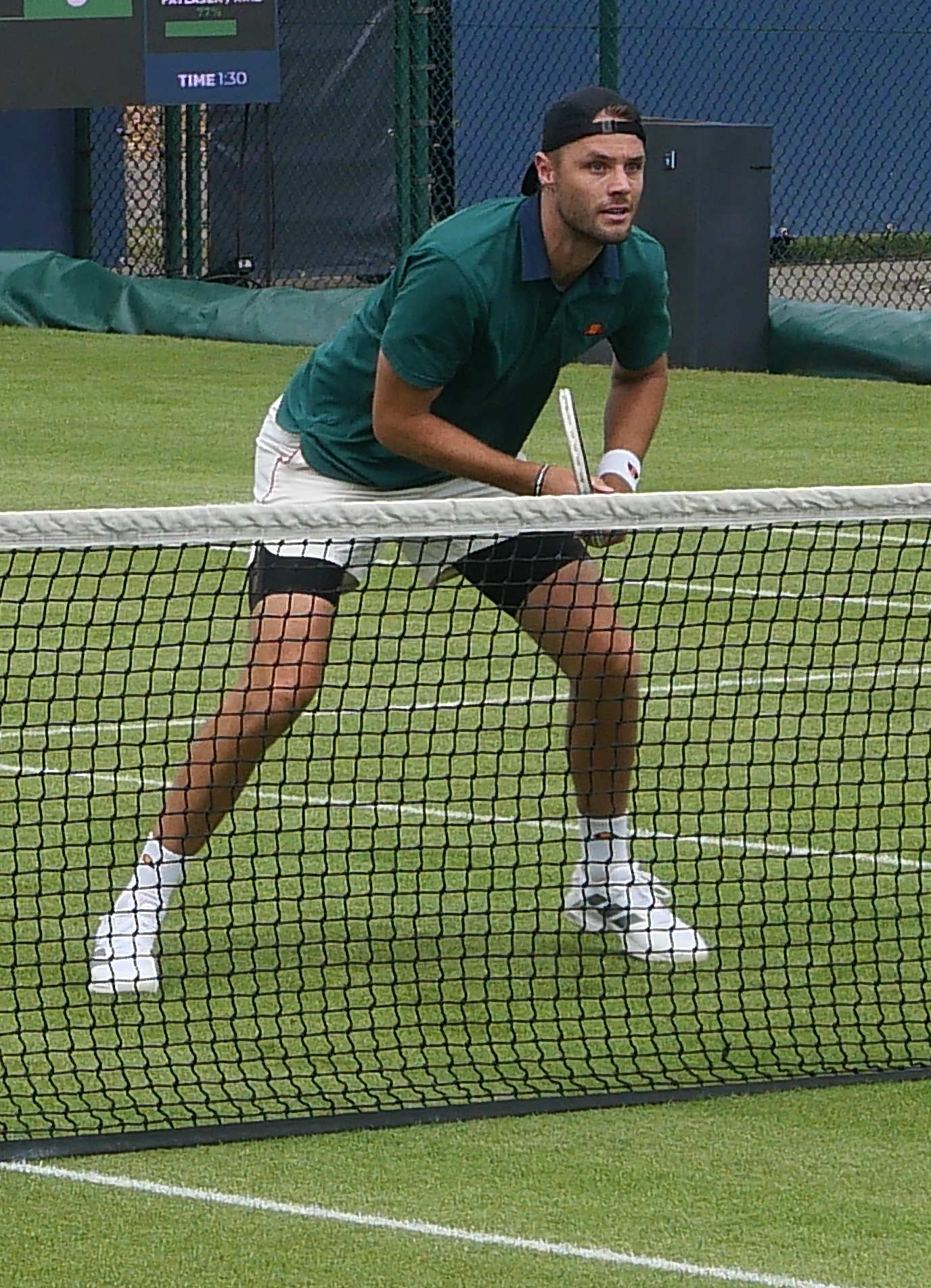
Verbeek at the 2026 Libéma Open

Verbeek made his debut at the 2025 Australian Open thus completing the set of appearances at all the Majors. He reached the quarterfinals of a Grand Slam for the first time with Göransson on his debut, defeating local wildcards Li Tu and Luke Saville, who played his last match before retirement. Next Verbeek and Göransson upset top pair Marcelo Arevalo and Mate Pavic to reach the semifinals of a Grand Slam for the first time in their careers.

Verbeek won his first Grand Slam title at the 2025 Wimbledon Championships partnering world No. 1 Kateřina Siniaková. Verbeek became the first Dutchman to win the mixed doubles title at Wimbledon.

== Grand Slam finals ==
=== Mixed doubles: 1 (1 title) ===
| Result | Year | Tournament | Surface | Partner | Opponents | Score |
|---|---|---|---|---|---|---|
| Win | 2025 | Wimbledon | Grass | (Czech Republic) Kateřina Siniaková | (Brazil) Luisa Stefani (United Kingdom) Joe Salisbury | 7–6^{(7–3)}, 7–6^{(7–3)} |

== ATP career finals ==
=== Doubles: 4 (2 title, 2 runners-up) ===
| Legend Grand Slam tournaments (0–0) ATP Finals (0–0) ATP Tour Masters 1000 (0–0) Summer Olympics (0–0) ATP Tour 500 Series (1–0) ATP Tour 250 Series (1–2) | Titles by surface Hard (0–2) Clay (1–0) Grass (1–0) | Titles by location Outdoors (2–2) Indoors (0–0) |

| Result | W–L | Date | Tournament | Tier | Surface | Partner | Opponents | Score |
|---|---|---|---|---|---|---|---|---|
| Loss | 0–1 | Jul 2021 | Los Cabos Open, Mexico | 250 Series | Hard | (United States) Hunter Reese | (Mexico) Hans Hach Verdugo (United States) John Isner | 7–5, 2–6, [4–10] |
| Win | 1–1 | Jul 2024 | Hall of Fame Open, United States | 250 Series | Grass | (Sweden) André Göransson | (United States) Robert Cash (United States) JJ Tracy | 6–3, 6–4 |
| Loss | 1–2 | Jul 2024 | Atlanta Open, United States | 250 Series | Hard | (Sweden) André Göransson | (United States) Nathaniel Lammons (United States) Jackson Withrow | 6–4, 4–6, [10–12] |
| Win | 2–2 | Apr 2025 | Bavarian Championships, Germany | 500 Series | Clay | (Sweden) André Göransson | (Germany) Kevin Krawietz (Germany) Tim Pütz | 6–4, 6–4 |

== ATP Challengers and ITF Futures finals ==
=== Doubles: 57 (38–19) ===
| Legend (doubles) ATP Challenger Tour (21–12) ITF Futures Tour (17–7) | Titles by surface Hard (30–14) Clay (8–5) Grass (0–0) |

| Result | W–L | Date | Tournament | Tier | Surface | Partner | Opponents | Score |
|---|---|---|---|---|---|---|---|---|
| Loss | 0–1 | Oct 2016 | USA F33, Berkeley | Futures | Hard | (Sweden) André Göransson | (United States) Connor Smith (United States) Rhyne Williams | 4–6, 3–6 |
| Win | 1–1 | Dec 2016 | Israel F16, Ramat Gan | Futures | Hard | (United States) John Lamble | (Canada) Martin Beran (Portugal) Bernardo Saraiva | 6–4, 6–4 |
| Win | 2–1 | Feb 2017 | Egypt F5, Sharm El Sheikh | Futures | Hard | (United States) Nathan Eshmade | (Germany) Jonas Lütjen (South Africa) Nicolaas Scholtz | 3–6, 6–3, [10–3] |
| Win | 3–1 | Feb 2017 | Egypt F6, Sharm El Sheikh | Futures | Hard | (Netherlands) Colin van Beem | (India) Chandril Sood (India) Lakshit Sood | 6–3, 6–2 |
| Win | 4–1 | Apr 2017 | Bahrain F2, Manama | Futures | Hard | (Philippines) Ruben Gonzales | (Germany) Florian Fallert (Belgium) Jonas Merckx | 6–3, 6–0 |
| Win | 5–1 | Apr 2017 | Qatar F1, Doha | Futures | Hard | (Chile) Jorge Montero | (Sweden) Markus Eriksson (Sweden) Milos Sekulic | 6–4, 6–7^{(5–7)}, [10–7] |
| Loss | 5–2 | Apr 2017 | Qatar F3, Doha | Futures | Hard | (United States) Anderson Reed | (Poland) Hubert Hurkacz (Sweden) Milos Sekulic | 6–1, 3–3 ret. |
| Win | 6–2 | May 2017 | Singapore F1, Singapore | Futures | Hard | (Philippines) Francis Casey Alcantara | (Japan) Hiroyasu Ehara (Japan) Sho Katayama | 6–3, 6–2 |
| Win | 7–2 | Jun 2017 | Singapore F2, Singapore | Futures | Hard | (Philippines) Francis Casey Alcantara | (Japan) Soichiro Moritani (Japan) Masato Shiga | 6–3, 6–4 |
| Win | 8–2 | Jun 2017 | Singapore F3, Singapore | Futures | Hard | (Philippines) Francis Casey Alcantara | (Japan) Yuichi Ito (Vietnam) Lý Hoàng Nam | 7–6^{(7–3)}, 6–2 |
| Loss | 8–3 | Jul 2017 | Netherlands F3, Middelburg | Futures | Clay | (Netherlands) Michiel de Krom | (United States) Evan King (United States) Hunter Reese | 2–6, 1–6 |
| Loss | 8–4 | Aug 2017 | Romania F10, Bucharest | Futures | Clay | (United States) Nathan Eshmade | (Romania) Victor-Mugurel Anagnastopol (Romania) Victor Vlad Cornea | 5–7, 6–7^{(1–7)} |
| Loss | 8–5 | Oct 2017 | Australia F7, Cairns | Futures | Hard | (Philippines) Francis Casey Alcantara | (United States) Nathan Pasha (Australia) Darren Polkinghorne | 2–6, 6–2, [2–10] |
| Win | 9–5 | Dec 2017 | Dominican Republic F2, Santo Domingo Este | Futures | Hard | (Portugal) Bernardo Saraiva | (Switzerland) Adrian Bodmer (Austria) Matthias Haim | 7–5, 6–4 |
| Win | 10–5 | Dec 2017 | Dominican Republic F3, Santo Domingo Este | Futures | Hard | (Portugal) Bernardo Saraiva | (Dominican Republic) Nick Hardt (Dominican Republic) José Olivares | 6–3, 6–4 |
| Win | 11–5 | Mar 2018 | USA F7, Bakersfield | Futures | Hard | (Portugal) Bernardo Saraiva | (Bolivia) Boris Arias (Bolivia) Federico Zeballos | 7–6^{(7–2)}, 6–3 |
| Loss | 11–6 | Mar 2018 | USA F8, Calabasas | Futures | Hard | (Portugal) Bernardo Saraiva | (Sweden) André Göransson (France) Florian Lakat | 2–6, 6–7^{(3–7)} |
| Win | 12–6 | Apr 2018 | Tunisia F16, Jerba | Futures | Hard | (Portugal) Bernardo Saraiva | (Croatia) Domagoj Bilješko (Turkey) Altuğ Çelikbilek | 6–3, 6–1 |
| Win | 13–6 | May 2018 | Tunisia F17, Jerba | Futures | Hard | (Portugal) Bernardo Saraiva | (Argentina) Ignacio Carou (Ecuador) Diego Hidalgo | 7–5, 6–3 |
| Win | 14–6 | May 2018 | Tunisia F18, Jerba | Futures | Hard | (Ecuador) Diego Hidalgo | (Tunisia) Anis Ghorbel (Bulgaria) Vasko Mladenov | 6–2, 6–4 |
| Win | 15–6 | Jun 2018 | USA F13, Winston-Salem | Futures | Hard | (Switzerland) Marc-Andrea Hüsler | (United States) Trevor Allen Johnson (United States) Ronnie Schneider | 7–6^{(9–7)}, 6–1 |
| Win | 16–6 | Jul 2018 | Canada F5, Saskatoon | Futures | Hard | (Switzerland) Marc-Andrea Hüsler | (Canada) Alexis Galarneau (Canada) Benjamin Sigouin | 6–3, 6–3 |
| Win | 17–6 | Jul 2018 | Winnipeg, Canada | Challenger | Hard | (Switzerland) Marc-Andrea Hüsler | (Spain) Marcel Granollers (Spain) Gerard Granollers Pujol | 6–7^{(5–7)}, 6–3, [14–12] |
| Win | 18–6 | Aug 2018 | Portugal F16, Sintra | Futures | Hard | (Portugal) Bernardo Saraiva | (Portugal) Gonçalo Falcão (Brazil) Diego Matos | 6–3, 6–0 |
| Loss | 18–7 | Jan 2019 | Nouméa, New Caledonia | Challenger | Hard | (Sweden) André Göransson | (Germany) Dustin Brown (United States) Donald Young | 5–7, 4–6 |
| Loss | 18–8 | Jan 2019 | Canberra, Australia | Challenger | Hard | (Sweden) André Göransson | (Brazil) Marcelo Demoliner (France) Hugo Nys | 6–3, 4–6, [3–10] |
| Win | 19–8 | Jul 2019 | Granby, Canada | Challenger | Hard | (Sweden) André Göransson | (China) Li Zhe (Monaco) Hugo Nys | 6–2, 6–4 |
| Win | 20–8 | Sep 2019 | Cassis, France | Challenger | Hard | (Sweden) André Göransson | (Netherlands) Sander Arends (Netherlands) David Pel | 7–6^{(8–6)}, 4–6, [11–9] |
| Loss | 20-9 | Oct 2019 | Fairfield, USA | Challenger | Hard | (Sweden) André Göransson | (Canada) Peter Polansky (Barbados) Darian King | 4–6, 6–3, [10–12] |
| Loss | 20-10 | Nov 2019 | Knoxville, USA | Challenger | Hard (i) | (United States) Bradley Klahn | (Mexico) Hans Hach Verdugo (Spain) Adrián Menéndez Maceiras | 6–7^{(6–8)}, 6–4, [5–10] |
| Win | 21–10 | Jan 2020 | Burnie, Australia | Challenger | Hard | (Finland) Harri Heliövaara | (Switzerland) Luca Margaroli (Italy) Andrea Vavassori | 7–6^{(7–5)}, 7–6^{(7–4)} |
| Loss | 21–11 | Aug 2020 | M15 Alkmaar, Netherlands | World Tennis Tour | Clay | (Netherlands) Mats Hermans | (Netherlands) Max Houkes (Netherlands) Sidane Pontjodikromo | 1–6, 7–5, [8–10] |
| Loss | 21-12 | Mar 2021 | Saint Petersburg, Russia | Challenger | Hard (i) | (Netherlands) Jesper de Jong | (United States) Christopher Eubanks (Ecuador) Roberto Quiroz | 4-6, 3–6 |
| Win | 22-12 | Mar 2021 | Saint Petersburg, Russia | Challenger | Hard (i) | (Netherlands) Jesper de Jong | (Russia) Konstantin Kravchuk (Kazakhstan) Denis Yevseyev | 6–1, 3–6, [10–5] |
| Loss | 22-13 | May 2021 | Heilbronn, Germany | Challenger | Clay | (Sweden) André Göransson | (United States) Nathaniel Lammons (United States) Jackson Withrow | 7–6^{(7–4)}, 4–6, [8–10] |
| Win | 23-13 | May 2021 | Oeiras, Portugal | Challenger | Clay | (United States) Hunter Reese | (France) Sadio Doumbia (France) Fabien Reboul | 4–6, 6–4, [10–7] |
| Loss | 23-14 | Apr 2022 | Ostrava, Czech Republic | Challenger | Clay | (United States) Hunter Reese | (Austria) Alexander Erler (Austria) Lucas Miedler | 6–7^{(5–7)}, 5–7 |
| Win | 24-14 | Jul 2022 | Lüdenscheid, Germany | Challenger | Clay | (Netherlands) Robin Haase | (Germany) Fabian Fallert (Germany) Hendrik Jebens | 6–2, 5–7, [10–3] |
| Win | 25-14 | Jul 2022 | Amersfoort, Netherlands | Challenger | Clay | (Netherlands) Robin Haase | (Colombia) Nicolás Barrientos (Mexico) Miguel Ángel Reyes-Varela | 6–4, 3–6, [10–7] |
| Loss | 25–15 | Feb 2023 | Tenerife, Spain | Challenger | Hard | (United Kingdom) Luke Johnson | (Australia) Andrew Harris (United States) Christian Harrison | 6–7^{(6–8)}, 7–6^{(7–4)}, [8–10] |
| Win | 26-15 | Feb 2023 | Rome, USA | Challenger | Hard (i) | (United Kingdom) Luke Johnson | (Brazil) Gabriel Décamps (United States) Alex Rybakov | 6–2, 6–2 |
| Win | 27-15 | May 2023 | Oeiras, Portugal | Challenger | Clay | (United Kingdom) Luke Johnson | (Portugal) Jaime Faria (Portugal) Henrique Rocha | 6–7^{(6–8)}, 7–5, [10–6] |
| Win | 28–15 | Nov 2023 | Charlottesville, USA | Challenger | Hard | (Australia) John-Patrick Smith | (United States) Denis Kudla (United States) Thai-Son Kwiatkowski | 3–6, 6–3, [10–5] |
| Win | 29–15 | Nov 2023 | Champaign, USA | Challenger | Hard | (Australia) John-Patrick Smith | (United States) Lucas Horve (United Kingdom) Oliver Okonkwo | 6–2, 7–6^{(7–4)} |
| Loss | 29–16 | Jan 2023 | Ottignies-Louvain-la-Neuve, Belgium | Challenger | Hard | (Netherlands) Sander Arends | (United Kingdom) Luke Johnson (Tunisia) Skander Mansouri | 5–7, 3–6 |
| Win | 30–16 | Feb 2023 | Koblenz, Germany | Challenger | Hard | (Netherlands) Sander Arends | (Germany) Jakob Schnaitter (Germany) Mark Wallner | 6–4, 6–2 |
| Loss | 30–17 | Feb 2024 | Tenerife, Spain | Challenger | Hard | (Netherlands) Sander Arends | (Czech Republic) Petr Nouza (Czech Republic) Patrik Rikl | 4–6, 6–4, [9–11] |
| Win | 31–17 | Mar 2024 | Tenerife, Spain | Challenger | Hard | (Netherlands) Sander Arends | (Italy) Marco Bortolotti (Spain) Sergio Martos Gornes | 6–4, 6–4 |
| Win | 32–17 | Aug 2024 | Lexington, USA | Challenger | Hard | (Sweden) André Göransson | (Japan) Y Shimizu (Japan) J Trotter | 6–4, 6–3 |
| Loss | 32–18 | Sep 2024 | Saint-Tropez, France | Challenger | Hard | (Sweden) André Göransson | (United Kingdom) Luke Johnson (Netherlands) Sander Arends | 6–3, 3–6, [4–10] |
| Loss | 32–19 | Nov 2024 | Bratislava, Slovakia | Challenger | Hard (i) | (Sweden) André Göransson | (Colombia) Nicolás Barrientos (United Kingdom) Julian Cash | 3–6, 4–6 |
| Win | 33–19 | Sep 2025 | Villena, Spain | Challenger | Hard | (Belgium) Sander Gillé | (Czech Republic) Petr Nouza (Czech Republic) Patrik Rikl | 6–3, 6–4 |
| Win | 34–19 | Oct 2025 | Brest, France | Challenger | Hard (i) | (Belgium) Sander Gillé | (France) Théo Arribagé (France) Albano Olivetti | 7–6^{(7–5)}, 7–6^{(7–4)} |
| Win | 35–19 | Oct 2025 | Bratislava, Slovakia | Challenger | Hard (i) | (Belgium) Sander Gillé | (United Kingdom) Joshua Paris (United Kingdom) Marcus Willis | 7–6^{(7–3)}, 6–3 |
| Win | 36–19 | Apr 2026 | Monza, Italy | Challenger | Clay | (Belgium) Sander Gillé | (Switzerland) Jakub Paul (Czech Republic) Matěj Vocel | 4–6, 7–6^{(7–3)}, [10–8] |
| Win | 37–19 | Apr 2026 | Cagliari, Italy | Challenger | Clay | (Belgium) Sander Gillé | (Czech Republic) Petr Nouza (Austria) Neil Oberleitner | 4–6, 6–3, [10–4] |
| Win | 38–19 | June 2026 | Perugia, Italy | Challenger | Clay | (Belgium) Sander Gillé | (United States) Ryan Seggerman (United States) Theodore Winegar | 7–6^{(7–3)}, 4–6, [10–6] |
