= 2016 Aircel Chennai Open – Doubles =

Doubles
- 2016 Aircel Chennai Open

Final
- Champions: (Austria) Oliver Marach (France) Fabrice Martin
- Runners-up: (United States) Austin Krajicek (France) Benoît Paire
- Score: 6–3, 7–5

Details
- Draw: 16
- Seeds: 4

Events
| Singles | Doubles |
| ← 2015 · | Maharashtra Open | · 2017 → |

Lu Yen-hsun and Jonathan Marray were the defending champions, but Lu chose not to compete this year and Marray chose to compete in Brisbane instead.
Oliver Marach and Fabrice Martin won the title, defeating Austin Krajicek and Benoît Paire in the final, 6–3, 7–5.

== Seeds ==
1. (South Africa) Raven Klaasen / (United States) Rajeev Ram (semifinals)
2. (Spain) Marcel Granollers / (India) Leander Paes (quarterfinals, withdrew)
3. (Austria) Oliver Marach / (France) Fabrice Martin (champions)
4. (New Zealand) Marcus Daniell / (New Zealand) Artem Sitak (first round)

== Draw ==
=== Key ===
- Q = Qualifier
- WC = Wild card
- LL = Lucky loser
- Alt = Alternate
- SE = Special exempt
- PR = Protected ranking
- ITF = ITF entry
- JE = Junior exempt
- w/o = Walkover
- r = Retired
- d = Defaulted
- SR = Special ranking

=== Draw ===
First round
1 | (South Africa) R Klaasen (United States) R Ram | 6 | 6^{2} | [10]
PR | (India) M Bhupathi (Luxembourg) G Müller | 3 | 7^{7} | [7]
(Austria) P Oswald (Canada) A Shamasdin | 3 | 5
(Czech Republic) L Rosol (Slovakia) I Zelenay | 6 | 7
3 | (Austria) O Marach (France) F Martin | 4 | 6 | [10]
(United Kingdom) A Bedene (Philippines) T Huey | 6 | 4 | [5]
(Belarus) A Bury (Croatia) B Ćorić | 4 | 3
(Poland) M Fyrstenberg (Mexico) S González | 6 | 6
WC | (India) S Devvarman (India) J Nedunchezhiyan | 4 | 6 | [10]
(United States) N Monroe (Chile) H Podlipnik Castillo | 6 | 3 | [5]
WC | (India) S Balaji (India) R Ramanathan | 2 | 7^{7} | [10]
4 | (New Zealand) M Daniell (New Zealand) A Sitak | 6 | 6^{5} | [5]
(United States) A Krajicek (France) B Paire | 6^{2} | 6 | [15]
(Belarus) S Betov (Russia) M Elgin | 7^{7} | 4 | [13]
Alt | (Japan) T Daniel (Australia) J Millman | 2 | 3
2 | (Spain) M Granollers (India) L Paes | 6 | 6

Quarterfinals
1 | (South Africa) R Klaasen (United States) R Ram | 7 | 7^{7}
(Czech Republic) L Rosol (Slovakia) I Zelenay | 5 | 6^{5}
3 | (Austria) O Marach (France) F Martin | 3 | 7^{7} | [10]
(Poland) M Fyrstenberg (Mexico) S González | 6 | 6^{3} | [7]
WC | (India) S Devvarman (India) J Nedunchezhiyan | 6 | 1 | [10]
WC | (India) S Balaji (India) R Ramanathan | 4 | 6 | [6]
(United States) A Krajicek (France) B Paire | w/o
2 | (Spain) M Granollers (India) L Paes

Semifinals
1 | (South Africa) R Klaasen (United States) R Ram | 6 | 5 | [5]
3 | (Austria) O Marach (France) F Martin | 4 | 7 | [10]
WC | (India) S Devvarman (India) J Nedunchezhiyan | 5 | 6^{4}
(United States) A Krajicek (France) B Paire | 7 | 7^{7}

Final
3 | (Austria) O Marach (France) F Martin | 6 | 7
(United States) A Krajicek (France) B Paire | 3 | 5
