= 2016 Aircel Chennai Open – Singles =

Singles
- 2016 Aircel Chennai Open

Final
- Champion: (Switzerland) Stan Wawrinka
- Runner-up: (Croatia) Borna Ćorić
- Score: 6–3, 7–5

Details
- Draw: 28 (4 Q / 3 WC )
- Seeds: 8

Events
Singles	Doubles
← 2015 ·	Maharashtra Open	· 2017 →

Stan Wawrinka was the two-time defending champion and successfully defended his title, defeating Borna Ćorić in the final, 6–3, 7–5. He did not lose a single set in the entire tournament.

== Seeds ==
The top four seeds received a bye into the second round.

1. (Switzerland) Stan Wawrinka (champion)
2. (South Africa) Kevin Anderson (withdrew due to left knee injury)
3. (France) Benoît Paire (semifinals)
4. (Spain) Roberto Bautista Agut (quarterfinals)
5. (Spain) Guillermo García López (quarterfinals)
6. (Luxembourg) Gilles Müller (second round)
7. (Canada) Vasek Pospisil (first round)
8. (Croatia) Borna Ćorić (final)

== Draw ==
=== Finals ===
Semifinals
1	(Switzerland) Stan Wawrinka	6	6
3	(France) Benoît Paire	3	4
8	(Croatia) Borna Ćorić	7^{7}	6^{5}	6
(United Kingdom) Aljaž Bedene	6^{5}	7^{7}	3

Final
1	(Switzerland) Stan Wawrinka	6	7
8	(Croatia) Borna Ćorić	3	5

=== Top half ===
First round
WC	(Russia) A Rublev	6	3	6
Q	(India) S Devvarman	3	6	3
(Spain) N Almagro	6	5	6^{1}
Q	(Croatia) A Pavić	3	7	7^{7}
(Japan) T Daniel	6	5	2
5	(Spain) G García López	4	7	6
(Colombia) S Giraldo	3	4
(Czech Republic) L Rosol	6	6
Q	(Italy) T Fabbiano	1	6	6
Q	(Slovakia) J Kovalík	6	3	2
WC	(Russia) K Khachanov	7^{7}	6^{4}	2
6	(Luxembourg) G Müller	6^{3}	7^{7}	6

Second round
1	(Switzerland) S Wawrinka	6	6
WC	(Russia) A Rublev	3	2
Q	(Croatia) A Pavić	6^{5}	1
5	(Spain) G García López	7^{7}	6
3	(France) B Paire	7	7
(Czech Republic) L Rosol	5	5
Q	(Italy) T Fabbiano	6	7
6	(Luxembourg) G Müller	4	5

Quarterfinals
1	(Switzerland) S Wawrinka	6	6
5	(Spain) G García López	4	4
3	(France) B Paire	6	7
Q	(Italy) T Fabbiano	4	5

Semifinals
1	(Switzerland) S Wawrinka	6	6
3	(France) B Paire	3	4

=== Bottom half ===
First round
8	(Croatia) B Ćorić	7^{7}	2	6
(Spain) M Granollers	6^{5}	6	4
(United States) R Ram	7^{7}	4	4
(United States) A Krajicek	6^{0}	6	6
(Australia) J Millman	6^{5}	6	7^{8}
(Russia) E Donskoy	7^{7}	4	6^{6}
7	(Canada) V Pospisil	5	6^{6}
(United Kingdom) A Bedene	7	7^{8}
(Italy) L Vanni	6	7^{7}
(Germany) J-L Struff	4	6^{5}
WC	(India) R Ramanathan	6	6
(Spain) D Gimeno Traver	2	0

Second round
8	(Croatia) B Ćorić	6	7
(United States) A Krajicek	2	5
(Australia) J Millman	4	1
4	(Spain) R Bautista Agut	6	6
(United Kingdom) A Bedene	5	6	6
(Italy) L Vanni	7	3	4
WC	(India) R Ramanathan	3	6	6
LL	(Russia) A Kudryavtsev	6	4	4

Quarterfinals
8	(Croatia) B Ćorić	3	6	7^{7}
4	(Spain) R Bautista Agut	6	4	6^{1}
(United Kingdom) A Bedene	6^{5}	6	6
WC	(India) R Ramanathan	7^{7}	4	3

Semifinals
8	(Croatia) B Ćorić	7^{7}	6^{5}	6
(United Kingdom) A Bedene	6^{5}	7^{7}	3

== Qualifying ==
=== Seeds ===
1. (Sweden) Elias Ymer (first round)
2. (United Kingdom) James Ward (qualifying competition)
3. (Italy) Thomas Fabbiano (qualified)
4. (Russia) Alexander Kudryavtsev (qualifying competition, lucky loser)
5. (India) Saketh Myneni (qualifying competition)
6. (India) Somdev Devvarman (qualified)
7. (Chile) Hans Podlipnik Castillo (first round)
8. (Slovakia) Jozef Kovalík (qualified)

=== Qualifiers ===
1. (Croatia) Ante Pavić
2. (India) Somdev Devvarman
3. (Italy) Thomas Fabbiano
4. (Slovakia) Jozef Kovalík

=== Lucky losers ===
1. (Russia) Alexander Kudryavtsev

=== Qualifying draw ===
==== First qualifier ====
First round
1	(Sweden) Elias Ymer	5	2
PR	(Croatia) Ante Pavić	7	6
WC	(India) Sriram Balaji	6	6
7	(Chile) Hans Podlipnik Castillo	2	4

Qualifying competition
PR	(Croatia) Ante Pavić	7^{7}	7^{7}
WC	(India) Sriram Balaji	6^{2}	6^{0}

==== Second qualifier ====
First round
2	(United Kingdom) James Ward	6	6
WC	(India) Jeevan Nedunchezhiyan	4	3
(India) Vijay Sundar Prashanth	2	3
6	(India) Somdev Devvarman	6	6

Qualifying competition
2	(United Kingdom) James Ward	6	5	4
6	(India) Somdev Devvarman	2	7	6

==== Third qualifier ====
First round
3	(Italy) Thomas Fabbiano	6	3
(Russia) Mikhail Elgin	4	1^{r}
(India) Sanam Singh	2	4
5	(India) Saketh Myneni	6	6

Qualifying competition
3	(Italy) Thomas Fabbiano	6	6
5	(India) Saketh Myneni	4	2

==== Fourth qualifier ====
First round
4	(Russia) Alexander Kudryavtsev	6	3	6
(Denmark) Frederik Nielsen	4	6	0
WC	(India) Prajnesh Gunneswaran	3	0
8	(Slovakia) Jozef Kovalík	6	6

Qualifying competition
4	(Russia) Alexander Kudryavtsev	6	6^{5}	1
8	(Slovakia) Jozef Kovalík	3	7^{7}	6
