= Saint Petersburg Challenger =

- 2021 Saint Petersburg Challenger

ATP Challenger Tour
- Event name: Saint Petersburg Challenger
- Location: Saint Petersburg, Russia
- Venue: Club Formula Tennis
- Category: ATP Challenger Tour
- Surface: Hard (Indoor)

The Saint Petersburg Challenger is a professional tennis tournament played on hard courts. It is currently part of the ATP Challenger Tour. It is held in Saint Petersburg, Russia.

== Past finals ==
=== Singles ===
Year	Champion	Runner-up	Score
2021 (2)	(Russia) Evgenii Tiurnev	(Poland) Kacper Żuk	6–4, 6–2
2021 (1)	(Belgium) Zizou Bergs	(Turkey) Altuğ Çelikbilek	6–4, 3–6, 6–4

=== Doubles ===
Year	Champions	Runners-up	Score
2021 (2)	(Netherlands) Jesper de Jong (Netherlands) Sem Verbeek	(Russia) Konstantin Kravchuk (Kazakhstan) Denis Yevseyev	6–1, 3–6, [10–5]
2021 (1)	(United States) Christopher Eubanks (Ecuador) Roberto Quiroz	(Netherlands) Jesper de Jong (Netherlands) Sem Verbeek	6–4, 6–3
