= Chandril Sood =

Indian tennis player

- Full name: Chandril Sood
- Country (sports): India
- Residence: Ghaziabad, India
- Born: 20 February 1991 (age 35) Ludhiana, India
- Height: 1.68 m (5 ft 6 in)
- Turned pro: 18
- Plays: Right-handed (two-handed backhand)
- Prize money: $32,812

Singles
- Career record: 0–0 (at ATP Tour level, Grand Slam level, and in Davis Cup)
- Career titles: 0 ITF
- Highest ranking: No. 908 (21 December 2015)

Doubles
- Career record: 0–1 (at ATP Tour level, Grand Slam level, and in Davis Cup)
- Career titles: 11 ITF
- Highest ranking: No. 282 (13 November 2017)

Chandril Sood (born 20 February 1991) is an Indian tennis player.

Sood has a career high ATP singles ranking of No. 908 achieved on 21 December 2015 and a career high ATP doubles ranking of No. 282 achieved on 13 November 2017.

Sood made his ATP main draw debut at the 2015 Aircel Chennai Open in the doubles draw partnering his twin brother Lakshit Sood. Till date Sood has won 11 doubles titles of ITF Men's futures in years 2015, 2016 and 2017 (2015 : 4, 2016 : 3 & 2017 : 4).

Sood has also represented INDIA at World University Games held at Gwangju, South Korea in the year 2015.
