= Evgenii Tiurnev =

Russian tennis player

- Country (sports): Russia
- Residence: Balashikha, Russia
- Born: 8 April 1997 (age 29)
- Plays: Right-handed (two-handed backhand)
- Coach: Mikhail Tsybin
- Prize money: $ 234,131

Singles
- Career record: 0-2 (ATP Tour level, Grand Slam level, and Davis Cup)
- Career titles: 0
- Highest ranking: No. 265 (14 February 2022)
- Current ranking: No. 627 (27 October 2024)

Doubles
- Career record: 0-2 (ATP Tour level, Grand Slam level, and Davis Cup)
- Career titles: 0
- Highest ranking: No. 291 (30 April 2018)
- Current ranking: No. 604 (27 October 2025)
- Last updated on: 27 October 2025.

Evgenii Igorevich Tiurnev (Russian: Евгений Игоревич Тюрнев, IPA: [jɪvˈɡʲenʲɪj ˈtʲurnʲɪf]; born 8 April 1997) is a Russian tennis player. He has career-high rankings of World No. 265 in singles achieved on 14 February 2022 and No. 291 in doubles achieved on 30 April 2018.

He has won two ATP Challengers and 14 Futures titles in singles as well as one ATP Challenger and eleven Futures titles in doubles.

== Career ==
=== 2017: ATP debut ===
He made his ATP World Tour main draw debut at the 2017 St. Petersburg Open having been granted a wildcard into the singles competition.

=== 2021: First two Challenger titles, top 300 debut ===
He won the 2021 Saint Petersburg Challenger II and the 2021 Antalya Challenger IV.

== Personal life ==
Tiurnev started playing tennis at 7.

== Challenger and Futures/World Tennis Tour Finals ==
=== Singles 34 (24–10) ===
Legend (singles) ATP Challenger Tour (2–0) ITF Futures Tour (22–10)	Titles by surface Hard (14–7) Clay (9–3) Grass (0–0) Carpet (1–0)

Result	W–L	Date	Tournament	Tier	Surface	Opponent	Score
Loss	0-1	Sep 2014	Russia F10, Vsevolozhsk	Futures	Clay	(Estonia) Vladimir Ivanov	1-6, 0-6
Win	1-1	Oct 2014	Belarus F4, Minsk	Futures	Hard(i)	(Russia) Victor Baluda	2-6, 7-5, 7-6^{(7-4)}
Win	2-1	Jan 2016	Kazakhstan F1, Aktobe	Futures	Hard(i)	(Serbia) Danilo Petrovic	7-6^{(7-2)}, 6-3
Win	3-1	Mar 2016	Azerbaijan F4, Baku	Futures	Carpet(i)	(Slovakia) Peter Vajda	7-6^{(7-1)}, 6-1
Win	4-1	Aug 2016	Russia F5, Moscow	Futures	Clay	(Estonia) Vladimir Ivanov	7-5, 6-4
Win	5-1	Sep 2016	Russia F7, Saint Petersburg	Futures	Hard	(Russia) Alexey Vatutin	6-4, 3-6, 6-3
Win	6-1	Jul 2017	Russia F2, Kazan	Futures	Hard	(Chile) Jorge Montero	6-1, 6-2
Win	7-1	Nov 2017	Estonia F3, Tallinn	Futures	Hard(i)	(Russia) Evgeny Karlovskiy	7-6^{(7-4)}, 6-3
Loss	7-2	Nov 2017	Estonia F4, Pärnu	Futures	Hard(i)	(Ukraine) Denys Mylokostov	6-7^{(5-7)}, 0-6
Win	8-2	Jan 2018	Spain F1, Manacor	Futures	Clay	(Spain) Daniel Muñoz de la Nava	6-4, 6-0
Loss	8-3	Mar 2018	Russia F2, Almetievsk	Futures	Hard(i)	(Belarus) Dzmitry Zhyrmont	1-6, 0-3 ret.
Loss	8-4	Apr 2018	Uzbekistan F1, Bukhara	Futures	Hard	(Japan) Hiroki Moriya	0-6, 1-6
Win	9-4	Aug 2018	Russia F8, Moscow	Futures	Clay	(Russia) Konstantin Kravchuk	6-1,6-1
Win	10-4	Nov 2018	Estonia F3, Pärnu	Futures	Hard(i)	(Ukraine) Vladyslav Manafov	4-6, 6-4, 6-3
Loss	10-5	Nov 2018	Finland F4, Helsinki	Futures	Hard(i)	(Belgium) Christopher Heyman	5-7, 3-6
Win	11-5	Jun 2019	M25, Gyula, Hungary	World Tennis Tour	Clay	(Sweden) Markus Eriksson	6-3, 6-3
Win	12-5	Nov 2019	M15, Pärnu, Estonia	World Tennis Tour	Hard(i)	(Estonia) Vladimir Ivanov	6-2, 7-6^{(7-2)}
Loss	12-6	Jan 2020	M15, Kazan, Russia	World Tennis Tour	Hard(i)	(Uzbekistan) Sergey Fomin	4-6, 6-3, 3-6
Loss	12-7	Feb 2020	M15, Cairo, Egypt	World Tennis Tour	Clay	(Argentina) Juan Pablo Paz	3-6, 6-7^{(6-8)}
Loss	12-8	Feb 2020	M25, Aktobe, Kazakhstan	World Tennis Tour	Hard(i)	(Russia) Alexey Zakharov	6-7^{(5-7)}, 6-3, 3-6
Win	13-8	Feb 2021	M15, Saint Petersburg, Russia	World Tennis Tour	Hard(i)	(Russia) Andrey Kuznetsov	4-6, 7-5. 7-5
Win	14-8	Mar 2021	Saint Petersburg, Russia	Challenger	Hard (i)	(Poland) Kacper Zuk	6-4, 6-2
Win	15-8	Dec 2021	Antalya, Turkey	Challenger	Clay	(Ukraine) Oleg Prihodko	3-6, 6-4, 6-4
Win	16-8	Feb 2022	M15, Antalya, Turkey	World Tennis Tour	Clay	(Romania) Cezar Crețu	7-6^{(9-7)}, 6-7^{(5-7)}, 7-5
Win	17-8	Apr 2023	M15, Sharm El Sheikh, Egypt	World Tennis Tour	Hard	(Georgia (country)) Saba Purtseladze	1-6, 7-6^{(7-5)}, 7-6^{(7-5)}
Win	18-8	Dec 2023	M15, Antalya, Turkey	World Tennis Tour	Clay	(France) Corentin Denolly	7-6^{(7-4)}, 5-7, 6-1
Loss	18-9	Jan 2024	M15, Monastir, Tunisia	World Tennis Tour	Hard	(Switzerland) Jakub Paul	5-7, 3-6
Win	19-9	Feb 2024	M15, Monastir, Tunisia	World Tennis Tour	Hard	Egor Agafonov	6-1, 2-0 ret.
Win	20–9	Apr 2024	M15, Antalya, Turkey	World Tennis Tour	Clay	(Germany) Liam Gavrielides	6–0, 2–6, 6–0
Win	21–9	May 2024	M25, Kachreti, Georgia	World Tennis Tour	Hard	(Israel) Yshai Oliel	3–6, 6–2, 6–2
Win	22–9	Jun 2024	M15, Hong Kong, Hong Kong	World Tennis Tour	Hard	(New Zealand) Ajeet Rai	6–4, 6–2
Win	23–9	Sep 2024	M15, Sharm El Sheikh, Egypt	World Tennis Tour	Hard	(Poland) Tomasz Berkieta	7–5, 6–1
Win	24–9	Nov 2024	M15, Antalya, Turkey	World Tennis Tour	Clay	(Romania) Filip Cristian Jianu	6–1, 6–7^{(4-7)}, 7–5
Loss	24–9	Dec 2024	M15, Antalya, Turkey	World Tennis Tour	Clay	(Switzerland) Kilian Feldbausch	3–6, 4–6

=== Doubles: 3 (1–2) ===
Legend ATP Challenger (1–3)	Finals by surface Hard (0–1) Clay (1–2) Grass (0–0) Carpet (0–0)

Result	W–L	Date	Tournament	Tier	Surface	Partner	Opponents	Score
Loss	0–1	Jul 2017	Astana, Kazakhstan	Challenger	Hard	(Russia) Evgeny Karlovskiy	(Japan) Toshihide Matsui (India) Vishnu Vardhan	6–7^{(3–7)}, 7–6^{(7–5)}, [7–10]
Loss	0-2	Jun 2021	Almaty, Kazakhstan	Challenger	Clay	(Ukraine) Vladyslav Manafov	(Netherlands) Jesper de Jong (Ukraine) Vitaliy Sachko	6-7^{(4-7)}, 1-6
Loss	0-3	Aug 2021	Prague, Czech Republic	Challenger	Clay	(Russia) Evgeny Karlovskiy	(Czech Republic) Jonas Forejtek (Czech Republic) Michael Vrbenský	1-6, 4-6
Win	1-3	Apr 2022	Barletta, Italy	Challenger	Clay	Evgeny Karlovskiy	(Japan) Ben McLachlan (Poland) Szymon Walków	6-3, 6-4

== Sources ==
- Evgenii Tiurnev at the Association of Tennis Professionals
- Evgenii Tiurnev at the International Tennis Federation
