= Lakshit Sood =

Indian tennis player

- Country (sports): India
- Residence: Ghaziabad, India
- Born: 20 February 1991 (age 35) Ludhiana, India
- Height: 1.66 m (5 ft 5 in)
- Plays: Right-handed (one-handed backhand)
- Prize money: $25,096

Singles
- Career record: 0–0 (at ATP Tour level, Grand Slam level, and in Davis Cup)
- Career titles: 0 ITF
- Highest ranking: No. 1,075 (20 July 2015)

Doubles
- Career record: 0–1 (at ATP Tour level, Grand Slam level, and in Davis Cup)
- Career titles: 11 ITF
- Highest ranking: No. 282 (13 November 2017)

Lakshit Sood (born 20 February 1991) is an Indian professional tennis player and a padel athlete. He has represented India in international competitions. Lakshit with his twin brother, Chandril Sood, have played as a doubles pairs in ITF and ATP tournaments.

== Professional tennis career ==
=== Rankings and achievements ===
• ATP Singles Ranking: Achieved a career-high of No. 1,075 on 20 July 2015. • ATP Doubles Ranking: Achieved a career-best of No. 282 on 13 November 2017.

=== ATP Main Draw Debut ===
Lakshit made his ATP Tour main draw debut at the 2015 Aircel Chennai Open, partnering with Chandril Sood in the doubles draw.

=== ITF Men’s Futures circuit ===
Lakshit has claimed 11 doubles titles in the ITF Men’s Futures circuit between 2015 and 2018.

• 2015: Secured 3 titles. • 2016: 3 additional titles. • 2017: 4 titles, his most successful year in terms of doubles performance. • 2018: 1 title.

== International representation ==
Lakshit has represented India, including:

• 2013: World University Games in Shenzhen, China. • 2015: World University Games in Gwangju, South Korea.

== Padel career ==
As of 30 December 2024, he holds a ranking of 1282 with the International Padel Federation (FIP).

== World Championships performance ==
In August 2024, Lakshit competed in the ITF Masters World Team & Individual Championships in Lisbon, Portugal:

• Doubles: Partnered with Chandril Sood to win the Bronze medal. • Mixed Doubles: Secured an individual Bronze medal alongside Joanne Homza from Canada.

== Current ITF Masters Rankings ==
• Singles: Ranked 11. • Doubles: Ranked 1. •Mixed Doubles: Ranked 12.
