= 2026 Matsuyama Challenger – Doubles =

Doubles
- 2026 Matsuyama Challenger

Final
- Champions: (New Zealand) Finn Reynolds (New Zealand) James Watt
- Runners-up: (Thailand) Pruchya Isaro (Japan) Yuta Shimizu
- Score: 6–3, 6–3

Events
Singles	Doubles
- Matsuyama Challenger

Marc-Andrea Hüsler and Garrett Johns were the defending champions but chose not to defend their title.

Finn Reynolds and James Watt won the title after defeating Pruchya Isaro and Yuta Shimizu 6–3, 6–3 in the final.

== Seeds ==
1. (New Zealand) Finn Reynolds / (New Zealand) James Watt (champions)
2. (Netherlands) Thijmen Loof / (Japan) Kaito Uesugi (first round)
3. (India) Siddhant Banthia / (India) Anirudh Chandrasekar (quarterfinals)
4. (Romania) Alexandru Jecan / (Poland) Szymon Kielan (quarterfinals)

== Draw ==
Key

- Q = Qualifier
- WC = Wild card
- LL = Lucky loser
- Alt = Alternate
- ITF = ITF entry
- PR = Protected ranking
- SR = Special ranking
- SE = Special exempt
- JE = Junior exempt
- JR = Junior Accelerator Programme entrant
- CO = College Accelerator Programme entrant
- NG = Next Gen Accelerator Program entrant
- w/o = Walkover
- r = Retired
- d = Defaulted

First round
1	(New Zealand) F Reynolds (New Zealand) J Watt	7^{7}	6
(India) SDP Dev (India) Nitin Kumar Sinha	6^{2}	3
(Japan) M Imamura (Japan) R Noguchi	6	6
(France) C Bittoun Kouzmine (Czech Republic) D Poljak	3	3
4	(Romania) A Jecan (Poland) S Kielan	6	6^{5}	[10]
PR	(Japan) T Matsui (India) R Ramanathan	4	7^{7}	[8]
(Japan) Y Kusuhara (Japan) S Nakagawa	3	6	[10]
WC	(Japan) Riku Takahata (Japan) Saki Tange	6	3	[7]
(Chinese Taipei) C-p Hsieh (Croatia) M Poljičak	6^{2}	6	[5]
(Thailand) P Isaro (Japan) Y Shimizu	7^{7}	4	[10]
(Japan) J Friend (Chinese Taipei) R Ho	3	4
3	(India) S Banthia (India) A Chandrasekar	6	6
(India) A Kadhe (China) A Wang	6	6
WC	(Japan) Kazushi Idogaki (Japan) Kentaro Otsuka	2	3
(United Kingdom) F Bass (United Kingdom) S Duncan	4	6	[10]
2	(Netherlands) T Loof (Japan) K Uesugi	6	4	[7]

Quarterfinals
1	(New Zealand) F Reynolds (New Zealand) J Watt	6	7^{11}
(Japan) M Imamura (Japan) R Noguchi	1	6^{9}
4	(Romania) A Jecan (Poland) S Kielan	6^{4}	2
(Japan) Y Kusuhara (Japan) S Nakagawa	7^{7}	6
(Thailand) P Isaro (Japan) Y Shimizu	6	6
3	(India) S Banthia (India) A Chandrasekar	4	4
(India) A Kadhe (China) A Wang	6	6^{5}	[10]
(United Kingdom) F Bass (United Kingdom) S Duncan	4	7^{7}	[7]

Semifinals
1	(New Zealand) F Reynolds (New Zealand) J Watt	6	7^{7}
(Japan) Y Kusuhara (Japan) S Nakagawa	3	6^{3}
(Thailand) P Isaro (Japan) Y Shimizu	7	2	[10]
(India) A Kadhe (China) A Wang	5	6	[8]

Final
1	(New Zealand) F Reynolds (New Zealand) J Watt	6	6
(Thailand) P Isaro (Japan) Y Shimizu	3	3
