= 2025 Matsuyama Challenger – Singles =

Singles
- 2025 Matsuyama Challenger

Final
- Champion: (Portugal) Henrique Rocha
- Runner-up: (Japan) Sho Shimabukuro
- Score: 7–5, 3–6, 6–2

Events
Singles	Doubles
- Matsuyama Challenger

Nicolas Moreno de Alboran was the defending champion but chose not to defend his title.

Henrique Rocha won the title after defeating Sho Shimabukuro 7–5, 3–6, 6–2 in the final.

== Seeds ==
1. (Portugal) Henrique Rocha (champion)
2. (France) Hugo Grenier (quarterfinals)
3. (United Kingdom) Oliver Crawford (quarterfinals)
4. (United Kingdom) Ryan Peniston (semifinals)
5. (Japan) Sho Shimabukuro (final)
6. (Bulgaria) Dimitar Kuzmanov (first round)
7. (Japan) Rio Noguchi (quarterfinals)
8. (Portugal) Frederico Ferreira Silva (semifinals)

== Draw ==
Key

- Q = Qualifier
- WC = Wild card
- LL = Lucky loser
- Alt = Alternate
- ITF = ITF entry
- PR = Protected ranking
- SR = Special ranking
- SE = Special exempt
- JE = Junior exempt
- JR = Junior Accelerator Programme entrant
- CO = College Accelerator Programme entrant
- NG = Next Gen Accelerator Program entrant
- w/o = Walkover
- r = Retired
- d = Defaulted

=== Finals ===
Semifinals
1	(Portugal) Henrique Rocha	6	6
8	(Portugal) Frederico Ferreira Silva	2	3
4	(United Kingdom) Ryan Peniston	3	2
5	(Japan) Sho Shimabukuro	6	6

Final
1	(Portugal) Henrique Rocha	7	3	6
5	(Japan) Sho Shimabukuro	5	6	2

=== Top half ===
First round
1	(Portugal) H Rocha	5	6	6
WC	(Japan) K Isomura	7	4	1
(Australia) M Bouzige	2^{r}
(Japan) Renta Tokuda	3
(Australia) P Sekulic	6	6
(South Korea) H Chung	4	3
(Japan) Y Takahashi	5	4
7	(Japan) R Noguchi	7	6
3	(United Kingdom) O Crawford	7^{9}	1	7^{7}
(Czech Republic) H Bartoň	6^{7}	6	6^{3}
(Switzerland) M-A Hüsler	6	7^{8}
WC	(Japan) Sho Katayama	4	6^{6}
Q	(United Kingdom) M Basing	6	1	6
Q	(Japan) Ryuki Matsuda	3	6	2
WC	(Japan) Y Kusuhara	6^{4}	7^{7}	3
8	(Portugal) F Ferreira Silva	7^{7}	6^{3}	6

Second round
1	(Portugal) H Rocha	6	6
(Japan) R Tokuda	4	3
(Australia) P Sekulic	2	6^{5}
7	(Japan) R Noguchi	6	7^{7}
3	(United Kingdom) O Crawford	7^{8}	6
(Switzerland) M-A Hüsler	6^{6}	4
Q	(United Kingdom) M Basing	1	3
8	(Portugal) F Ferreira Silva	6	6

Quarterfinals
1	(Portugal) H Rocha	7	4	6
7	(Japan) R Noguchi	5	6	3
3	(United Kingdom) O Crawford	7^{7}	4	5
8	(Portugal) F Ferreira Silva	6^{3}	6	7

Semifinals
1	(Portugal) H Rocha	6	6
8	(Portugal) F Ferreira Silva	2	3

=== Bottom half ===
First round
6	(Bulgaria) D Kuzmanov	1	3
(Croatia) D Ajduković	6	6
Q	(Japan) Koki Matsuda	7^{7}	6
(Jordan) A Shelbayh	6^{4}	2
(South Korea) Shin San-hui	6	5	3
Q	(Japan) S Nakagawa	2	7	6
Q	(Japan) Takuya Kumasaka	0	1
4	(United Kingdom) R Peniston	6	6
5	(Japan) S Shimabukuro	6	6
Q	(Japan) Yuki Mochizuki	4	2
(Thailand) M Jones	4	6	1
(United States) G Johns	6	4	6
JR	(United States) K Bigun	4	4
(Japan) Y Uchiyama	6	6
(Japan) Hikaru Shiraishi	4	4
2	(France) H Grenier	6	6

Second round
(Croatia) D Ajduković	6	3	6
Q	(Japan) K Matsuda	4	6	3
Q	(Japan) S Nakagawa	2	7^{7}	3
4	(United Kingdom) R Peniston	6	6^{5}	6
5	(Japan) S Shimabukuro	6	6
(United States) G Johns	2	2
(Japan) Y Uchiyama	7^{10}	3	1
2	(France) H Grenier	6^{8}	6	6

Quarterfinals
(Croatia) D Ajduković	5	6	2
4	(United Kingdom) R Peniston	7	3	6
5	(Japan) S Shimabukuro	4	6	6
2	(France) H Grenier	6	3	2

Semifinals
4	(United Kingdom) R Peniston	3	2
5	(Japan) S Shimabukuro	6	6
