= 2024 Matsuyama Challenger – Doubles =

Doubles
- 2024 Matsuyama Challenger

Final
- Champions: (Japan) Seita Watanabe (Japan) Takeru Yuzuki
- Runners-up: (United States) Nicolas Moreno de Alboran (New Zealand) Rubin Statham
- Score: 6–4, 6–3

Events
Singles	Doubles
- Matsuyama Challenger

Karol Drzewiecki and Zdeněk Kolář were the defending champions but chose not to defend their title.

Seita Watanabe and Takeru Yuzuki won the title after defeating Nicolas Moreno de Alboran and Rubin Statham 6–4, 6–3 in the final.

== Seeds ==
1. (United Kingdom) David Stevenson / (United Kingdom) Marcus Willis (first round)
2. (South Korea) Nam Ji-sung / (Australia) Matthew Romios (first round)
3. (India) Anirudh Chandrasekar / (India) Niki Kaliyanda Poonacha (first round)
4. (Australia) Calum Puttergill / (United States) Reese Stalder (first round)

== Draw ==
Key

- Q = Qualifier
- WC = Wild card
- LL = Lucky loser
- Alt = Alternate
- ITF = ITF entry
- PR = Protected ranking
- SR = Special ranking
- SE = Special exempt
- JE = Junior exempt
- JR = Junior Accelerator Programme entrant
- CO = College Accelerator Programme entrant
- NG = Next Gen Accelerator Program entrant
- w/o = Walkover
- r = Retired
- d = Defaulted

=== Draw ===
First round
1	(United Kingdom) D Stevenson (United Kingdom) M Willis	6	2	[8]
WC	(Japan) Sho Katayama (Japan) K Uchida	2	6	[10]
(Japan) S Watanabe (Japan) T Yuzuki	6	6
(Japan) T Matsui (Japan) K Uesugi	3	3
3	(India) A Chandrasekar (India) N Kaliyanda Poonacha	6	6^{7}	[8]
(India) S Myneni (India) R Ramanathan	4	7^{9}	[10]
(Australia) T Fancutt (Chinese Taipei) R Ho	7^{9}	7
WC	(Japan) Y Kusuhara (Japan) S Nakagawa	6^{7}	5
(Italy) M Gigante (Italy) Andrea Picchione	6	1	[14]
(United States) N Moreno de Alboran (New Zealand) R Statham	2	6	[16]
(United States) V Kirkov (Netherlands) B Stevens	6	6
4	(Australia) C Puttergill (United States) R Stalder	1	2
(Peru) A Merino (Germany) C Negritu	6^{2}	2
(Australia) T Schoolkate (Australia) L Tu	7^{7}	6
(Thailand) P Isaro (United Kingdom) J Paris	6	7^{7}
2	(South Korea) J-s Nam (Australia) MC Romios	4	6^{1}

Quarterfinals
WC	(Japan) S Katayama (Japan) K Uchida	0	3
(Japan) S Watanabe (Japan) T Yuzuki	6	6
(India) S Myneni (India) R Ramanathan	3	6	[9]
(Australia) T Fancutt (Chinese Taipei) R Ho	6	4	[11]
(United States) N Moreno de Alboran (New Zealand) R Statham	6	6
(United States) V Kirkov (Netherlands) B Stevens	4	1
(Australia) T Schoolkate (Australia) L Tu	6	7
(Thailand) P Isaro (United Kingdom) J Paris	4	5

Semifinals
(Japan) S Watanabe (Japan) T Yuzuki	6	6
(Australia) T Fancutt (Chinese Taipei) R Ho	3	2
(United States) N Moreno de Alboran (New Zealand) R Statham	w/o
(Australia) T Schoolkate (Australia) L Tu

Final
(Japan) S Watanabe (Japan) T Yuzuki	6	6
(United States) N Moreno de Alboran (New Zealand) R Statham	4	3
