= 2023 Matsuyama Challenger – Singles =

Singles
- 2023 Matsuyama Challenger

Final
- Champion: (Italy) Luca Nardi
- Runner-up: (Japan) Taro Daniel
- Score: 3–6, 6–4, 6–2

Events
Singles	Doubles
- Matsuyama Challenger

Hong Seong-chan was the defending champion but lost in the first round to Luca Nardi.

Nardi won the title after defeating Taro Daniel 3–6, 6–4, 6–2 in the final.

== Seeds ==
1. (Japan) Taro Daniel (final)
2. (Japan) Shintaro Mochizuki (second round)
3. (Italy) Luca Nardi (champion)
4. (Japan) Sho Shimabukuro (second round)
5. (Germany) Benjamin Hassan (quarterfinals)
6. (Australia) Marc Polmans (first round)
7. (China) Bu Yunchaokete (quarterfinals)
8. (Chinese Taipei) Hsu Yu-hsiou (quarterfinals)

== Draw ==
Key

- Q = Qualifier
- WC = Wild card
- LL = Lucky loser
- Alt = Alternate
- ITF = ITF entry
- PR = Protected ranking
- SR = Special ranking
- SE = Special exempt
- JE = Junior exempt
- JR = Junior Accelerator Programme entrant
- CO = College Accelerator Programme entrant
- NG = Next Gen Accelerator Program entrant
- w/o = Walkover
- r = Retired
- d = Defaulted

=== Finals ===
Semifinals
1	(Japan) Taro Daniel	7^{7}	6
Q	(Denmark) August Holmgren	6^{5}	2
3	(Italy) Luca Nardi	6	6
(France) Geoffrey Blancaneaux	3	3

Final
1	(Japan) Taro Daniel	6	4	2
3	(Italy) Luca Nardi	3	6	6

=== Top half ===
First round
1	(Japan) T Daniel	6	6
WC	(Japan) S Nakagawa	1	2
(Tunisia) M Echargui	6	6
(France) A Weber	0	3
(Chinese Taipei) J Jung	4	6	4
(Japan) Y Shimizu	6	2	6
(Czech Republic) Z Kolář	2	3
8	(Chinese Taipei) Y-h Hsu	6	6
4	(Japan) S Shimabukuro	5	6	6
(Italy) G Fonio	7	4	4
(Croatia) D Ajduković	6	6
(Japan) K Uchida	4	4
(Chinese Taipei) T-l Wu	4	1
WC	(Japan) Y Uchiyama	6	6
Q	(Denmark) A Holmgren	6	6
6	(Australia) M Polmans	0	4

Second round
1	(Japan) T Daniel	6	3	6
(Tunisia) M Echargui	2	6	2
(Japan) Y Shimizu	4	3
8	(Chinese Taipei) Y-h Hsu	6	6
4	(Japan) S Shimabukuro	6^{3}	3
(Croatia) D Ajduković	7^{7}	6
WC	(Japan) Y Uchiyama	6^{8}	6^{5}
Q	(Denmark) A Holmgren	7^{10}	7^{7}

Quarterfinals
1	(Japan) T Daniel	6	3	7
8	(Chinese Taipei) Y-h Hsu	2	6	5
(Croatia) D Ajduković	5	6	6^{5}
Q	(Denmark) A Holmgren	7	3	7^{7}

Semifinals
1	(Japan) T Daniel	7^{7}	6
Q	(Denmark) A Holmgren	6^{5}	2

=== Bottom half ===
First round
7	(China) Y Bu	6^{4}	6	6
(Cyprus) M Efstathiou	7^{7}	2	2
Q	(China) Z Li	6	4	4
(Australia) D Sweeny	2	6	6
(Portugal) F Ferreira Silva	3	2
(Australia) J McCabe	6	6
(South Korea) S-c Hong	5	6	6^{4}
3	(Italy) L Nardi	7	3	7^{7}
5	(Germany) B Hassan	6	6
Q	(Japan) H Moriya	4	4
Q	(Japan) J Trotter	4	3
Q	(Australia) B Ellis	6	6
WC	(Japan) Sho Katayama	0	4
(France) G Blancaneaux	6	6
Q	(Japan) N Nakagawa	2	2
2	(Japan) S Mochizuki	6	6

Second round
7	(China) Y Bu	6	5	7
(Australia) D Sweeny	4	7	5
(Australia) J McCabe	4	4
3	(Italy) L Nardi	6	6
5	(Germany) B Hassan	1	7^{7}	6
Q	(Australia) B Ellis	6	6^{4}	3
(France) G Blancaneaux	7	6
2	(Japan) S Mochizuki	5	3

Quarterfinals
7	(China) Y Bu	5	3
3	(Italy) L Nardi	7	6
5	(Germany) B Hassan	3	2
(France) G Blancaneaux	6	6

Semifinals
3	(Italy) L Nardi	6	6
(France) G Blancaneaux	3	3
