= 2022 Matsuyama Challenger =

- Date: 7–13 November
- Edition: 1st
- Category: ATP Challenger 80
- Surface: Hard
- Location: Matsuyama, Japan

Champions

Singles
- (South Korea) Hong Seong-chan

Doubles
- (Australia) Andrew Harris / (Australia) John-Patrick Smith
- Matsuyama Challenger

The 2022 Matsuyama Challenger was a professional tennis tournament played on hard courts. It was the 1st edition of the tournament, which was part of the 2022 ATP Challenger Tour. It took place in Matsuyama, Japan, between 7 and 13 November 2022.

== Singles main-draw entrants ==
=== Seeds ===
Country	Player	Rank^{1}	Seed
~~AUS~~	~~Christopher O'Connell~~	~~102~~	~~1~~
AUS	Rinky Hijikata	159	2
~~AUS~~	~~John Millman~~	~~160~~	~~3~~
JPN	Kaichi Uchida	172	4
FRA	Benoît Paire	173	5
BIH	Damir Džumhur	179	6
AUS	Li Tu	197	7
JPN	Rio Noguchi	202	8

- ^{1} Rankings are as of 31 October 2022.

=== Other entrants ===
The following players received wildcards into the singles main draw:

- (Japan) Sho Katayama
- (Japan) Yusuke Kusuhara
- (Japan) Shintaro Mochizuki

The following player received entry into the singles main draw using a protected ranking:

- (Japan) Yūichi Sugita

The following player received entry into the singles main draw as a special exempt:

- (Chinese Taipei) Hsu Yu-hsiou

The following player received entry into the singles main draw as an alternate:

- (Japan) Sho Shimabukuro

The following players received entry from the qualifying draw:

- (South Korea) Hong Seong-chan
- (Chinese Taipei) Jason Jung
- (Turkey) Ergi Kırkın
- (Japan) Koki Matsuda
- (India) Mukund Sasikumar
- (Japan) Shuichi Sekiguchi

The following players received entry as lucky losers:

- (Japan) Naoki Nakagawa
- (Japan) Yuta Shimizu

== Champions ==
=== Singles ===
- (South Korea) Hong Seong-chan def. (Chinese Taipei) Wu Tung-lin 6–3, 6–2.

=== Doubles ===
- (Australia) Andrew Harris / (Australia) John-Patrick Smith def. (Japan) Toshihide Matsui / (Japan) Kaito Uesugi 6–3, 4–6, [10–8].
