= 2025 Matsuyama Challenger =

- Date: 3–9 November
- Edition: 4th
- Category: ATP Challenger Tour
- Surface: Hard
- Location: Matsuyama, Japan

Champions

Singles
- (Portugal) Henrique Rocha

Doubles
- (Switzerland) Marc-Andrea Hüsler / (United States) Garrett Johns
- Matsuyama Challenger

The 2025 Ehime International Open Tennis was a professional tennis tournament played on hardcourts. It was the fourth edition of the tournament which was part of the 2025 ATP Challenger Tour. It took place in Matsuyama, Japan, between 3 and 9 November 2025.

== Singles main-draw entrants ==
=== Seeds ===
Country	Player	Rank^{1}	Seed
POR	Henrique Rocha	162	1
FRA	Hugo Grenier	176	2
GBR	Oliver Crawford	187	3
GBR	Ryan Peniston	190	4
JPN	Sho Shimabukuro	193	5
BUL	Dimitar Kuzmanov	250	6
JPN	Rio Noguchi	252	7
POR	Frederico Ferreira Silva	254	8

- ^{1} Rankings are as of 27 October 2025.

=== Other entrants ===
The following players received wildcards into the singles main draw:

- (Japan) Kokoro Isomura
- (Japan) Sho Katayama
- (Japan) Yusuke Kusuhara

The following player received entry into the singles main draw through the Junior Accelerator programme:

- (United States) Kaylan Bigun

The following players received entry from the qualifying draw:

- (United Kingdom) Max Basing
- (Japan) Takuya Kumasaka
- (Japan) Koki Matsuda
- (Japan) Ryuki Matsuda
- (Japan) Yuki Mochizuki
- (Japan) Shunsuke Nakagawa

== Champions ==
=== Singles ===
- (Portugal) Henrique Rocha def. (Japan) Sho Shimabukuro 7–5, 3–6, 6–2.

=== Doubles ===
- (Switzerland) Marc-Andrea Hüsler / (United States) Garrett Johns def. (New Zealand) Finn Reynolds / (New Zealand) James Watt 6–3, 6–4.
