= 2025 Matsuyama Challenger – Doubles =

Doubles
- 2025 Matsuyama Challenger

Final
- Champions: (Switzerland) Marc-Andrea Hüsler (United States) Garrett Johns
- Runners-up: (New Zealand) Finn Reynolds (New Zealand) James Watt
- Score: 6–3, 6–4

Events
Singles	Doubles
- Matsuyama Challenger

Seita Watanabe and Takeru Yuzuki were the defending champions but chose not to defend their title.

Marc-Andrea Hüsler and Garrett Johns won the title after defeating Finn Reynolds and James Watt 6–3, 6–4 in the final.

== Seeds ==
1. (New Zealand) Finn Reynolds / (New Zealand) James Watt (final)
2. (Australia) Blake Bayldon / (Netherlands) Mats Hermans (first round)
3. (India) Jeevan Nedunchezhiyan / (Netherlands) Mick Veldheer (semifinals)
4. (United States) George Goldhoff / (United States) Theodore Winegar (first round)

== Draw ==
Key

- Q = Qualifier
- WC = Wild card
- LL = Lucky loser
- Alt = Alternate
- ITF = ITF entry
- PR = Protected ranking
- SR = Special ranking
- SE = Special exempt
- JE = Junior exempt
- JR = Junior Accelerator Programme entrant
- CO = College Accelerator Programme entrant
- NG = Next Gen Accelerator Program entrant
- w/o = Walkover
- r = Retired
- d = Defaulted

First round
1	(New Zealand) F Reynolds (New Zealand) J Watt	6	6
(Japan) Yuta Kikuchi (Japan) Yamato Sueoka	3	2
(Japan) Y Kusuhara (Japan) S Nakagawa	4	3
(Japan) Yuki Mochizuki (Japan) Ryotaro Taguchi	6	6
3	(India) J Nedunchezhiyan (Netherlands) M Veldheer	6	7^{7}
(Japan) Yuichiro Inui (Malaysia) Mitsuki Wei Kang Leong	3	6^{4}
WC	(Japan) Naoya Honda (Japan) Riku Takahata	0	3
(Thailand) M Jones (Japan) Hikaru Shiraishi	6	6
WC	(Japan) Sho Katayama (Japan) Yuhei Kono	2	5
(Switzerland) M-A Hüsler (United States) G Johns	6	7
(Japan) Ryuki Matsuda (South Korea) Shin San-hui	4	7	[10]
4	(United States) G Goldhoff (United States) T Winegar	6	5	[1]
(Netherlands) T Loof (China) A Wang	4	4
(United Kingdom) M Basing (Japan) Koki Matsuda	6	6
(Japan) K Isomura (Japan) N Tajima	6	7^{9}
2	(Australia) B Bayldon (Netherlands) M Hermans	3	6^{7}

Quarterfinals
1	(New Zealand) F Reynolds (New Zealand) J Watt	6	6
(Japan) Y Mochizuki (Japan) R Taguchi	3	4
3	(India) J Nedunchezhiyan (Netherlands) M Veldheer	6	6
(Thailand) M Jones (Japan) H Shiraishi	3	4
(Switzerland) M-A Hüsler (United States) G Johns	6	6
(Japan) R Matsuda (South Korea) S-h Shin	3	4
(United Kingdom) M Basing (Japan) K Matsuda	5	1
(Japan) K Isomura (Japan) N Tajima	7	6

Semifinals
1	(New Zealand) F Reynolds (New Zealand) J Watt	6	3	[10]
3	(India) J Nedunchezhiyan (Netherlands) M Veldheer	4	6	[8]
(Switzerland) M-A Hüsler (United States) G Johns	4	6	[10]
(Japan) K Isomura (Japan) N Tajima	6	3	[8]

Final
1	(New Zealand) F Reynolds (New Zealand) J Watt	3	4
(Switzerland) M-A Hüsler (United States) G Johns	6	6
