= 2026 Matsuyama Challenger =

- Date: 9–15 November
- Edition: 5th
- Category: ATP Challenger Tour
- Surface: Hard
- Location: Matsuyama, Japan

Champions

Singles
- (United Kingdom) Billy Harris

Doubles
- (New Zealand) Finn Reynolds / (New Zealand) James Watt
- Matsuyama Challenger

The 2026 Matsuyama Challenger was a professional tennis tournament played on hardcourts. It was the fifth edition of the tournament which was part of the 2026 ATP Challenger Tour. It took place in Matsuyama, Japan, between 9 and 15 November 2026.

== Singles main-draw entrants ==
=== Seeds ===
Country	Player	Rank^{1}	Seed
JPN	Rei Sakamoto	123	1
~~GRE~~	~~Stefanos Sakellaridis~~	~~129~~	~~2~~
AUT	Joel Schwärzler	172	3
JPN	Taro Daniel	178	4
USA	Keegan Smith	192	5
ESP	David Jordà Sanchis	199	6
GBR	Liam Broady	212	7
JPN	Rio Noguchi	219	8
TPE	Tseng Chun-hsin	230	9

- ^{1} Rankings are as of 2 November 2026.

=== Other entrants ===
The following players received wildcards into the singles main draw:

- (Japan) Naoya Honda
- (Japan) Yusuke Kusuhara
- (Japan) Shunsuke Nakagawa

The following player received entry into the singles main draw through the Junior Accelerator programme:

- (Germany) Niels McDonald

The following player received entry into the singles main draw as an alternate:

- (Japan) Kaichi Uchida

The following players received entry from the qualifying draw:

- (Japan) Shintaro Imai
- (Japan) Takuya Kumasaka
- (Japan) Koki Matsuda
- (Japan) Ryuki Matsuda
- (Japan) Hikaru Shiraishi
- (Japan) Renta Tokuda

The following player received entry as a lucky loser:

- (Japan) Masamichi Imamura

== Champions ==
=== Singles ===
- (United Kingdom) Billy Harris def. (Chinese Taipei) Hsu Yu-hsiou 3–6, 6–1, 7–6^{(8–6)}.

=== Doubles ===
- (New Zealand) Finn Reynolds / (New Zealand) James Watt def. (Thailand) Pruchya Isaro / (Japan) Yuta Shimizu 6–3, 6–3.
