= 2023 Matsuyama Challenger – Doubles =

Doubles
- 2023 Matsuyama Challenger

Final
- Champions: (Poland) Karol Drzewiecki (Czech Republic) Zdeněk Kolář
- Runners-up: (Japan) Toshihide Matsui (Japan) Kaito Uesugi
- Score: 6–3, 6–2

Events
Singles	Doubles
- Matsuyama Challenger

Andrew Harris and John-Patrick Smith were the defending champions but chose not to defend their title.

Karol Drzewiecki and Zdeněk Kolář won the title after defeating Toshihide Matsui and Kaito Uesugi 6–3, 6–2 in the final.

== Seeds ==
1. (Serbia) Ivan Sabanov / (Serbia) Matej Sabanov (first round)
2. (Poland) Karol Drzewiecki / (Czech Republic) Zdeněk Kolář (champions)
3. (Japan) Toshihide Matsui / (Japan) Kaito Uesugi (final)
4. (Chinese Taipei) Ray Ho / (Australia) Matthew Romios (semifinals)

== Draw ==
Key

- Q = Qualifier
- WC = Wild card
- LL = Lucky loser
- Alt = Alternate
- ITF = ITF entry
- PR = Protected ranking
- SR = Special ranking
- SE = Special exempt
- JE = Junior exempt
- JR = Junior Accelerator Programme entrant
- CO = College Accelerator Programme entrant
- NG = Next Gen Accelerator Program entrant
- w/o = Walkover
- r = Retired
- d = Defaulted

First round
1	(Serbia) I Sabanov (Serbia) M Sabanov	4	7^{7}	[9]
(India) P Raja (India) R Ramanathan	6	6^{2}	[11]
Alt	(South Korea) S-c Hong (Chinese Taipei) J Jung	5	4
(South Korea) J-s Nam (Japan) K Uchida	7	6
3	(Japan) T Matsui (Japan) K Uesugi	7^{7}	7
(Chinese Taipei) Y-h Hsu (South Korea) M-k Song	6^{2}	5
(Tunisia) M Echargui (Germany) B Hassan	6	0	[10]
(South Korea) Y-s Chung (Philippines) R Gonzales	3	6	[5]
(Australia) B Ellis (Australia) C Puttergill	3	6^{1}
(Sweden) F Bergevi (Netherlands) M Veldheer	6	7^{7}
WC	(Japan) Sho Katayama (Japan) T Yuzuki	5	3
4	(Chinese Taipei) R Ho (Australia) MC Romios	7	6
(Japan) S Mochizuki (Japan) S Shimabukuro	7^{7}	6
(India) N Kaliyanda Poonacha (India) D Sharan	6^{5}	1
(Philippines) FC Alcantara (China) Y Bu	3	6	[7]
2	(Poland) K Drzewiecki (Czech Republic) Z Kolář	6	3	[10]

Quarterfinals
(India) P Raja (India) R Ramanathan	2	4
(South Korea) J-s Nam (Japan) K Uchida	6	6
3	(Japan) T Matsui (Japan) K Uesugi	7^{7}	6^{7}	[10]
(Tunisia) M Echargui (Germany) B Hassan	6^{3}	7^{9}	[8]
(Sweden) F Bergevi (Netherlands) M Veldheer	6^{2}	7^{7}	[7]
4	(Chinese Taipei) R Ho (Australia) MC Romios	7^{7}	6^{4}	[10]
(Japan) S Mochizuki (Japan) S Shimabukuro
2	(Poland) K Drzewiecki (Czech Republic) Z Kolář	w/o

Semifinals
(South Korea) J-s Nam (Japan) K Uchida	3	7^{8}	[10]
3	(Japan) T Matsui (Japan) K Uesugi	6	6^{6}	[12]
4	(Chinese Taipei) R Ho (Australia) MC Romios	5	5
2	(Poland) K Drzewiecki (Czech Republic) Z Kolář	7	7

Final
3	(Japan) T Matsui (Japan) K Uesugi	3	2
2	(Poland) K Drzewiecki (Czech Republic) Z Kolář	6	6
