= 2022 Matsuyama Challenger – Singles =

Singles
- 2022 Matsuyama Challenger

Final
- Champion: (South Korea) Hong Seong-chan
- Runner-up: (Chinese Taipei) Wu Tung-lin
- Score: 6–3, 6–2

Events
Singles	Doubles
- Matsuyama Challenger

This was the first edition of the tournament as an ATP Challenger Tour event.

Hong Seong-chan won the title after defeating Wu Tung-lin 6–3, 6–2 in the final.

== Seeds ==
1. (Australia) Christopher O'Connell (withdrew)
2. (Australia) Rinky Hijikata (first round)
3. (Australia) John Millman (withdrew)
4. (Japan) Kaichi Uchida (quarterfinals)
5. (France) Benoît Paire (second round, retired)
6. (Bosnia and Herzegovina) Damir Džumhur (second round)
7. (Australia) Li Tu (second round)
8. (Japan) Rio Noguchi (first round)

== Draw ==
Key

- Q = Qualifier
- WC = Wild card
- LL = Lucky loser
- Alt = Alternate
- ITF = ITF entry
- PR = Protected ranking
- SR = Special ranking
- SE = Special exempt
- JE = Junior exempt
- JR = Junior Accelerator Programme entrant
- CO = College Accelerator Programme entrant
- NG = Next Gen Accelerator Program entrant
- w/o = Walkover
- r = Retired
- d = Defaulted

=== Finals ===
Semifinals
(Vietnam) Lý Hoàng Nam	2	5
(Chinese Taipei) Wu Tung-lin	6	7
WC	(Japan) Shintaro Mochizuki	1	6	3
Q	(South Korea) Hong Seong-chan	6	2	6

Final
(Chinese Taipei) Wu Tung-lin	3	2
Q	(South Korea) Hong Seong-chan	6	6

=== Top half ===
First round
Q	(Japan) Shuichi Sekiguchi	7^{7}	6^{4}	2^{r}
Q	(Japan) Koki Matsuda	6^{4}	7^{7}	3
PR	(Japan) Y Sugita	7^{7}	3	4
(Vietnam) NH Lý	6^{5}	6	6
SE	(Chinese Taipei) Y-h Hsu	7	6
WC	(Japan) Sho Katayama	5	4
(Australia) D Sweeny	6	4	5
5	(France) B Paire	4	6	7
4	(Japan) K Uchida	6	7^{7}
(Japan) Y Uchiyama	3	6^{4}
(Czech Republic) Z Kolář	3	1
Alt	(Japan) S Shimabukuro	6	6
WC	(Japan) Y Kusuhara	1	1
(Japan) H Moriya	6	6
(Chinese Taipei) T-l Wu	6	6
8	(Japan) R Noguchi	2	3

Second round
Q	(Japan) K Matsuda	4	3
(Vietnam) NH Lý	6	6
SE	(Chinese Taipei) Y-h Hsu	6	2
5	(France) B Paire	4	1^{r}
4	(Japan) K Uchida	7	7^{7}
Alt	(Japan) S Shimabukuro	5	6^{3}
(Japan) H Moriya	6	5	1
(Chinese Taipei) T-l Wu	1	7	6

Quarterfinals
(Vietnam) NH Lý	6	7^{8}
SE	(Chinese Taipei) Y-h Hsu	2	6^{6}
4	(Japan) K Uchida	6^{5}	7^{7}	4
(Chinese Taipei) T-l Wu	7^{7}	6^{4}	6

Semifinals
(Vietnam) NH Lý	2	5
(Chinese Taipei) T-l Wu	6	7

=== Bottom half ===
First round
6	(Bosnia and Herzegovina) D Džumhur	3	6	6
Q	(Turkey) E Kırkın	6	3	2
WC	(Japan) S Mochizuki	6	6
(Romania) FC Jianu	3	4
(Romania) ND Ionel	6	5	6
LL	(Japan) Y Shimizu	4	7	2
(Portugal) F Ferreira Silva	6	6
LL	(Japan) N Nakagawa	3	3
7	(Australia) L Tu	6	7^{7}
(India) R Ramanathan	3	6^{3}
Q	(Chinese Taipei) J Jung	7	6
(Japan) Yo Watanuki	5	4
Q	(South Korea) S-c Hong	6	6
Q	(India) M Sasikumar	2	1
(Croatia) N Serdarušić	6	5	6
2	(Australia) R Hijikata	3	7	2

Second round
6	(Bosnia and Herzegovina) D Džumhur	7	6^{4}	4
WC	(Japan) S Mochizuki	5	7^{7}	6
(Romania) ND Ionel	6	7
(Portugal) F Ferreira Silva	4	5
7	(Australia) L Tu	2	2
Q	(Chinese Taipei) J Jung	6	6
Q	(South Korea) S-c Hong	6	6
(Croatia) N Serdarušić	4	2

Quarterfinals
WC	(Japan) S Mochizuki	6	6^{6}	7^{7}
(Romania) ND Ionel	4	7^{8}	6^{3}
Q	(Chinese Taipei) J Jung	1	4
Q	(South Korea) S-c Hong	6	6

Semifinals
WC	(Japan) S Mochizuki	1	6	3
Q	(South Korea) S-c Hong	6	2	6
