= 2026 Matsuyama Challenger – Singles =

Singles
- 2026 Matsuyama Challenger

Final
- Champion: (United Kingdom) Billy Harris
- Runner-up: (Chinese Taipei) Hsu Yu-hsiou
- Score: 3–6, 6–1, 7–6^{(8–6)}

Events
Singles	Doubles
- Matsuyama Challenger

Henrique Rocha was the defending champion but chose not to defend his title.

Billy Harris won the title after defeating Hsu Yu-hsiou 3–6, 6–1, 7–6^{(8–6)} in the final.

== Seeds ==
1. (Japan) Rei Sakamoto (semifinals, retired)
2. (Greece) Stefanos Sakellaridis (withdrew)
3. (Austria) Joel Schwärzler (second round)
4. (Japan) Taro Daniel (quarterfinals)
5. (United States) Keegan Smith (first round)
6. (Spain) David Jordà Sanchis (first round)
7. (United Kingdom) Liam Broady (first round)
8. (Japan) Rio Noguchi (semifinals)
9. (Chinese Taipei) Tseng Chun-hsin (first round)

== Draw ==
Key

- Q = Qualifier
- WC = Wild card
- LL = Lucky loser
- Alt = Alternate
- ITF = ITF entry
- PR = Protected ranking
- SR = Special ranking
- SE = Special exempt
- JE = Junior exempt
- JR = Junior Accelerator Programme entrant
- CO = College Accelerator Programme entrant
- NG = Next Gen Accelerator Program entrant
- w/o = Walkover
- r = Retired
- d = Defaulted

=== Finals ===
Semifinals
1	(Japan) Rei Sakamoto	6	2^{r}
(United Kingdom) Billy Harris	4	2
8	(Japan) Rio Noguchi	1	4
(Chinese Taipei) Hsu Yu-hsiou	6	6

Final
(United Kingdom) Billy Harris	3	6	7^{8}
(Chinese Taipei) Hsu Yu-hsiou	6	1	6^{6}

=== Top half ===
First round
1	(Japan) R Sakamoto	6	6
Q	(Japan) Renta Tokuda	1	2
(Thailand) K Samrej	7	2	6
(Japan) Y Shimizu	5	6	3
Q	(Japan) Hikaru Shiraishi	6	6^{5}	3
(Serbia) O Milić	1	7^{7}	6
WC	(Japan) S Nakagawa	4	6	7^{7}
6	(Spain) D Jordà Sanchis	6	3	6^{4}
3	(Austria) J Schwärzler	6	6
(Malaysia) Mitsuki Wei Kang Leong	2	2
(Croatia) M Poljičak	2	7^{7}	3
Alt	(Japan) K Uchida	6	6^{4}	6
Q	(Japan) Shintaro Imai	6^{5}	6	3
(China) F Sun	7^{7}	3	6
(United Kingdom) B Harris	2	6	7
7	(United Kingdom) L Broady	6	3	5

Second round
1	(Japan) R Sakamoto	6	6
(Thailand) K Samrej	4	2
(Serbia) O Milić	6	6
WC	(Japan) S Nakagawa	1	2
3	(Austria) J Schwärzler	6^{4}	7	0
Alt	(Japan) K Uchida	7^{7}	5	6
(China) F Sun	1	3
(United Kingdom) B Harris	6	6

Quarterfinals
1	(Japan) R Sakamoto	7^{7}	6
(Serbia) O Milić	6^{2}	2
Alt	(Japan) K Uchida	5	4
(United Kingdom) B Harris	7	6

Semifinals
1	(Japan) R Sakamoto	6	2^{r}
(United Kingdom) B Harris	4	2

=== Bottom half ===
First round
8	(Japan) R Noguchi	7^{8}	6
(Poland) D Michalski	6^{6}	1
Q	(Japan) Takuya Kumasaka	0	1
(China) Y Zhou	6	6
Q	(Japan) Ryuki Matsuda	3	4
(Germany) M Schönhaus	6	6
LL	(Japan) M Imamura	4	0
4	(Japan) T Daniel	6	6
5	(United States) K Smith	3	3
(Chinese Taipei) Y-h Hsu	6	6
JR	(Germany) N McDonald	6	6
Q	(Japan) Koki Matsuda	4	4
(Japan) J Friend	6	3	6
WC	(Japan) Y Kusuhara	2	6	3
WC	(Japan) Naoya Honda	6	6
9	(Chinese Taipei) C-h Tseng	4	2

Second round
8	(Japan) R Noguchi	6	6
(China) Y Zhou	4	4
(Germany) M Schönhaus	2	1
4	(Japan) T Daniel	6	6
(Chinese Taipei) Y-h Hsu	6	6
JR	(Germany) N McDonald	3	3
(Japan) J Friend	6	6
WC	(Japan) N Honda	4	0

Quarterfinals
8	(Japan) R Noguchi	7^{8}	6
4	(Japan) T Daniel	6^{6}	3
(Chinese Taipei) Y-h Hsu	6	2	7^{8}
(Japan) J Friend	1	6	6^{6}

Semifinals
8	(Japan) R Noguchi	1	4
(Chinese Taipei) Y-h Hsu	6	6
