= 2024 Matsuyama Challenger – Singles =

Singles
- 2024 Matsuyama Challenger

Final
- Champion: (United States) Nicolas Moreno de Alboran
- Runner-up: (Australia) Alex Bolt
- Score: 7–6^{(7–4)}, 6–2

Events
Singles	Doubles
- Matsuyama Challenger

Luca Nardi was the defending champion but chose not to defend his title.

Nicolas Moreno de Alboran won the title after defeating Alex Bolt 7–6^{(7–4)}, 6–2 in the final.

== Seeds ==
1. (Japan) Taro Daniel (withdrew)
2. (Italy) Mattia Bellucci (withdrew)
3. (Chinese Taipei) Tseng Chun-hsin (first round)
4. (United States) Mackenzie McDonald (withdrew)
5. (United States) Nicolas Moreno de Alboran (champion)
6. (Italy) Matteo Gigante (first round)
7. (Japan) Yasutaka Uchiyama (second round, retired)
8. (France) Térence Atmane (quarterfinals)

== Draw ==
Key

- Q = Qualifier
- WC = Wild card
- LL = Lucky loser
- Alt = Alternate
- ITF = ITF entry
- PR = Protected ranking
- SR = Special ranking
- SE = Special exempt
- JE = Junior exempt
- JR = Junior Accelerator Programme entrant
- CO = College Accelerator Programme entrant
- NG = Next Gen Accelerator Program entrant
- w/o = Walkover
- r = Retired
- d = Defaulted

=== Finals ===
Semifinals
(Japan) Yosuke Watanuki	3	6	3
(Australia) Alex Bolt	6	4	6
5	(United States) Nicolas Moreno de Alboran	7^{7}	6
(Belgium) Alexander Blockx	6^{5}	2

Final
(Australia) Alex Bolt	6^{4}	2
5	(United States) Nicolas Moreno de Alboran	7^{7}	6

=== Top half ===
First round
Q	(Japan) K Isomura	6	6
(Austria) J Rodionov	4	3
WC	(Japan) R Sakamoto	1	6^{3}
(Sweden) E Ymer	6	7^{7}
(Japan) Y Watanuki	5	6	6
Q	(China) Y Zhou	7	3	3
LL	(Japan) H Moriya	6	6
6	(Italy) M Gigante	0	4
3	(Chinese Taipei) C-h Tseng	2	2
(Hong Kong) C Wong	6	6
(Croatia) M Dodig	2	0^{r}
(Australia) A Bolt	6	3
LL	(Japan) Shintaro Imai	6	3	6
Y Demin	4	6	1
WC	(Japan) Sho Katayama	1	2
8	(France) T Atmane	6	6

Second round
Q	(Japan) K Isomura	6	5	6
(Sweden) E Ymer	3	7	3
(Japan) Y Watanuki	6	6
LL	(Japan) H Moriya	2	0
(Hong Kong) C Wong	6^{5}	2
(Australia) A Bolt	7^{7}	6
LL	(Japan) S Imai	4	3
8	(France) T Atmane	6	6

Quarterfinals
Q	(Japan) K Isomura	0	5
(Japan) Y Watanuki	6	7
(Australia) A Bolt	6	4	6
8	(France) T Atmane	1	6	3

Semifinals
(Japan) Y Watanuki	3	6	3
(Australia) A Bolt	6	4	6

=== Bottom half ===
First round
5	(United States) N Moreno de Alboran	6	7
(Australia) T Schoolkate	4	5
Q	(Australia) J McCabe	6^{2}	6	6
Q	(France) B Paire	7^{7}	4	4
(Italy) F Cinà	6	6
Q	(Australia) D Sweeny	2	4
(Australia) L Tu	1	6	6
Q	(United States) A Ayeni	6	3	2
7	(Japan) Y Uchiyama	6	6^{5}	6
(France) M Janvier	3	7^{7}	4
(Belgium) A Blockx	6	6
WC	(Japan) S Nakagawa	2	3
(Netherlands) G den Ouden	5	6^{3}
(Japan) S Mochizuki	7	7^{7}
SE	(Georgia (country)) N Basilashvili	6	4	6
LL	(Australia) P Sekulic	3	6	3

Second round
5	(United States) N Moreno de Alboran	6	6
Q	(Australia) J McCabe	4	3
(Italy) F Cinà	5	6	6
(Australia) L Tu	7	4	3
7	(Japan) Y Uchiyama	3^{r}
(Belgium) A Blockx	4
(Japan) S Mochizuki	6	6
SE	(Georgia (country)) N Basilashvili	4	4

Quarterfinals
5	(United States) N Moreno de Alboran	6	6
(Italy) F Cinà	3	4
(Belgium) A Blockx	6	7^{7}
(Japan) S Mochizuki	4	6^{2}

Semifinals
5	(United States) N Moreno de Alboran	7^{7}	6
(Belgium) A Blockx	6^{5}	2
