= 2022 Matsuyama Challenger – Doubles =

Doubles
- 2022 Matsuyama Challenger

Final
- Champions: (Australia) Andrew Harris (Australia) John-Patrick Smith
- Runners-up: (Japan) Toshihide Matsui (Japan) Kaito Uesugi
- Score: 6–3, 4–6, [10–8]

Events
Singles	Doubles
- Matsuyama Challenger

This was the first edition of the tournament as an ATP Challenger Tour event.

Andrew Harris and John-Patrick Smith won the title after defeating Toshihide Matsui and Kaito Uesugi 6–3, 4–6, [10–8] in the final.

== Seeds ==
1. (India) Arjun Kadhe / (India) Ramkumar Ramanathan (first round)
2. (Romania) Victor Vlad Cornea / (Czech Republic) Zdeněk Kolář (first round)
3. (Australia) Andrew Harris / (Australia) John-Patrick Smith (champions)
4. (Philippines) Ruben Gonzales / (Indonesia) Christopher Rungkat (quarterfinals)

== Draw ==
Key

- Q = Qualifier
- WC = Wild card
- LL = Lucky loser
- Alt = Alternate
- ITF = ITF entry
- PR = Protected ranking
- SR = Special ranking
- SE = Special exempt
- JE = Junior exempt
- JR = Junior Accelerator Programme entrant
- CO = College Accelerator Programme entrant
- NG = Next Gen Accelerator Program entrant
- w/o = Walkover
- r = Retired
- d = Defaulted

First round
1	(India) A Kadhe (India) R Ramanathan	0	3
(Japan) S Mochizuki (Japan) R Noguchi	6	6
(South Korea) Y-s Chung (Japan) Y Shimizu	4	2
WC	(Japan) Sho Katayama (Japan) T Yuzuki	6	6
3	(Australia) A Harris (Australia) J-P Smith	6	6
Alt	(Romania) ND Ionel (Romania) FC Jianu	2	1
(Philippines) F Alcantara (Vietnam) NH Lý	4	7	[7]
(Bosnia and Herzegovina) D Džumhur (Croatia) N Serdarušić	6	5	[10]
(Portugal) F Ferreira Silva (Japan) H Moriya	2	4
(Japan) T Matsui (Japan) K Uesugi	6	6
(Australia) R Hijikata (Chinese Taipei) Y-h Hsu	4	6	[9]
4	(Philippines) R Gonzales (Indonesia) C Rungkat	6	3	[11]
(South Korea) J-s Nam (South Korea) M-k Song	6	6
WC	(Japan) Yuhei Kono (Japan) Y Kusuhara	3	4
(Australia) D Sweeny (Australia) L Tu	6	4	[12]
2	(Romania) VV Cornea (Czech Republic) Z Kolář	3	6	[10]

Quarterfinals
(Japan) S Mochizuki (Japan) R Noguchi
WC	(Japan) S Katayama (Japan) T Yuzuki	w/o
3	(Australia) A Harris (Australia) J-P Smith	6	3	[10]
(Bosnia and Herzegovina) D Džumhur (Croatia) N Serdarušić	3	6	[7]
(Japan) T Matsui (Japan) K Uesugi	7^{7}	6
4	(Philippines) R Gonzales (Indonesia) C Rungkat	6^{5}	3
(South Korea) J-s Nam (South Korea) M-k Song	3	4
(Australia) D Sweeny (Australia) L Tu	6	6

Semifinals
WC	(Japan) S Katayama (Japan) T Yuzuki	4	4
3	(Australia) A Harris (Australia) J-P Smith	6	6
(Japan) T Matsui (Japan) K Uesugi	7	6
(Australia) D Sweeny (Australia) L Tu	5	4

Final
3	(Australia) A Harris (Australia) J-P Smith	6	4	[10]
(Japan) T Matsui (Japan) K Uesugi	3	6	[8]
