= 2023 Matsuyama Challenger =

- Date: 6–12 November
- Edition: 2nd
- Category: ATP Challenger Tour
- Surface: Hard
- Location: Matsuyama, Japan

Champions

Singles
- (Italy) Luca Nardi

Doubles
- (Poland) Karol Drzewiecki / (Czech Republic) Zdeněk Kolář
- Matsuyama Challenger

The 2023 Matsuyama Challenger was a professional tennis tournament played on hard courts. It was the second edition of the tournament which was part of the 2023 ATP Challenger Tour. It took place in Matsuyama, Japan, between 6 and 12 November 2023.

== Singles main-draw entrants ==
=== Seeds ===
Country	Player	Rank^{1}	Seed
JPN	Taro Daniel	97	1
JPN	Shintaro Mochizuki	133	2
ITA	Luca Nardi	141	3
JPN	Sho Shimabukuro	146	4
GER	Benjamin Hassan	154	5
AUS	Marc Polmans	161	6
CHN	Bu Yunchaokete	168	7
TPE	Hsu Yu-hsiou	169	8

- ^{1} Rankings are as of 30 October 2023.

=== Other entrants ===
The following players received wildcards into the singles main draw:

- (Japan) Sho Katayama
- (Japan) Shunsuke Nakagawa
- (Japan) Yasutaka Uchiyama

The following players received entry from the qualifying draw:

- (Australia) Blake Ellis
- (Denmark) August Holmgren
- (China) Li Zhe
- (Japan) Hiroki Moriya
- (Japan) Naoki Nakagawa
- (Japan) James Trotter

== Champions ==
=== Singles ===
- (Italy) Luca Nardi def. (Japan) Taro Daniel 3–6, 6–4, 6–2.

=== Doubles ===
- (Poland) Karol Drzewiecki / (Czech Republic) Zdeněk Kolář def. (Japan) Toshihide Matsui / (Japan) Kaito Uesugi 6–3, 6–2.
