= 2024 Matsuyama Challenger =

- Date: 4–10 November
- Edition: 3rd
- Category: ATP Challenger Tour
- Surface: Hard
- Location: Matsuyama, Japan

Champions

Singles
- (United States) Nicolas Moreno de Alboran

Doubles
- (Japan) Seita Watanabe / (Japan) Takeru Yuzuki
- Matsuyama Challenger

The 2024 Matsuyama Challenger was a professional tennis tournament played on hardcourts. It was the third edition of the tournament which was part of the 2024 ATP Challenger Tour. It took place in Matsuyama, Japan, between 4 and 10 November 2024.

== Singles main-draw entrants ==
=== Seeds ===
Country	Player	Rank^{1}	Seed
~~JPN~~	~~Taro Daniel~~	~~78~~	~~1~~
~~ITA~~	~~Mattia Bellucci~~	~~105~~	~~2~~
TPE	Tseng Chun-hsin	115	3
~~USA~~	~~Mackenzie McDonald~~	~~118~~	~~4~~
USA	Nicolas Moreno de Alboran	123	5
ITA	Matteo Gigante	138	6
JPN	Yasutaka Uchiyama	139	7
FRA	Térence Atmane	156	8

- ^{1} Rankings are as of 28 October 2024.

=== Other entrants ===
The following players received wildcards into the singles main draw:

- (Japan) Sho Katayama
- (Japan) Shunsuke Nakagawa
- (Japan) Rei Sakamoto

The following player received entry into the singles main draw as a special exempt:

- (Georgia (country)) Nikoloz Basilashvili

The following players received entry from the qualifying draw:

- (United States) Alafia Ayeni
- (Japan) Kokoro Isomura
- (Australia) James McCabe
- (France) Benoît Paire
- (Australia) Dane Sweeny
- (China) Zhou Yi

The following players received entry as lucky losers:

- (Japan) Shintaro Imai
- (Japan) Hiroki Moriya
- (Australia) Philip Sekulic

== Champions ==
=== Singles ===
- (United States) Nicolas Moreno de Alboran def. (Australia) Alex Bolt 7–6^{(7–4)}, 6–2.

=== Doubles ===
- (Japan) Seita Watanabe / (Japan) Takeru Yuzuki def. (United States) Nicolas Moreno de Alboran / (New Zealand) Rubin Statham 6–4, 6–3.
