= Toshihide Matsui =

Japanese tennis player (born 1978)

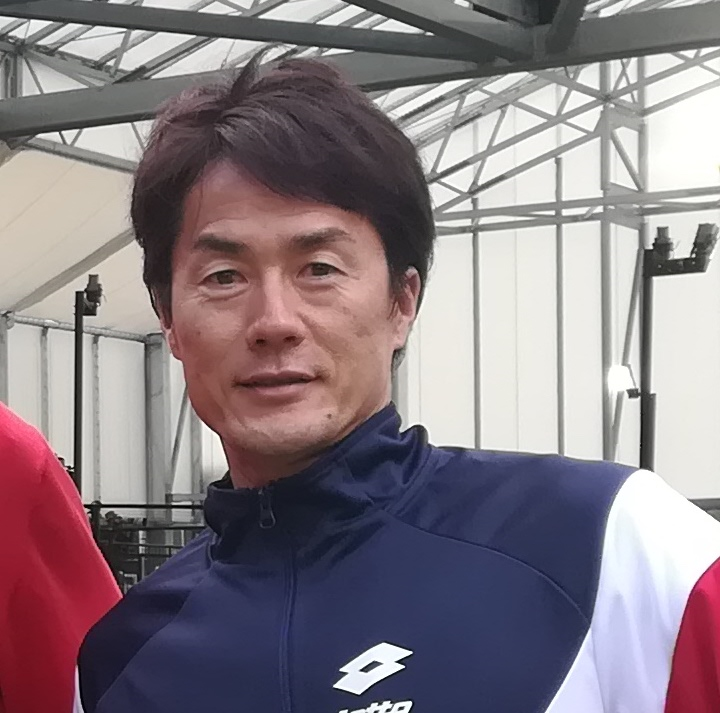
- Toshihide 'Toshi' Matsui at TTC, Kashiwa during the Japanese Premium tournament in 2021
- Country (sports): Japan
- Residence: Kashiwa, Chiba, Japan
- Born: 19 April 1978 (age 48) Osaka, Japan
- Height: 1.78 m (5 ft 10 in)
- Turned pro: 2001
- Plays: Right-handed (one handed backhand)
- Coach: David Porter (1997–2000), Robert Davis (2014–17), Laurence Tieleman (2004–14, 2018–), Jason Yue (2018–)
- Prize money: US $413,693

Singles
- Career record: 4–2
- Career titles: 0
- Highest ranking: No. 261 (12 June 2006)

Doubles
- Career record: 3–11
- Career titles: 0
- Highest ranking: No. 121 (27 May 2024)
- Current ranking: No. 1,306 (5 October 2026)
Medal record
Representing Japan
Men's Tennis
Asian Games
Silver medal – second place	2006 Doha	Team
Bronze medal – third place	2010 Guangzhou	Team
East Asian Games
Silver medal – second place	2005 Macau	Singles
Bronze medal – third place	2005 Macau	Doubles
- Last updated on: 8 October 2026.

Toshihide Matsui (松井 俊英, Matsui Toshihide; born 19 April 1978) is a professional Japanese tennis player. He has a career-high ATP singles ranking of No. 261 achieved on 12 June 2006 and a doubles ranking of No. 121 achieved on 27 May 2024. He is currently the oldest active singles player in the ATP world doubles rankings.

== Career ==
He was the runner-up in men's singles at the Japanese National Championships in 2006 when he lost the final against Satoshi Iwabuchi.

He won 6 Japanese national championship titles in men's doubles category: 4 titles with Satoshi Iwabuchi (2005, 2007–09) and 2 titles with Kaito Uesugi (2021–22).

When he played at the 2019 Shenzhen Longhua Open against 18-year-old Chun-hsin Tseng as a lucky loser, it was the largest age difference ever in a Challenger match, with Matsui being the oldest player at 41 years old, with an ATP ranking.

He represented Japan in three Davis Cup ties between 2006 and 2010, his win–loss record is 4–1. Plus Matsui participated in the first 2 editions of ATP Cup in 2020–2021 as a member of Team Japan. Matsui holds the record as the oldest player in ATP Cup history.

In February 2024, Matsui achieved his highest ranking in doubles, No.123, at the age of 45; he later improved this to No. 121 on 27 May 2024, aged 46.

== Records ==
Description	Record	Players matched
Championships
Current oldest active player on ATP Tour in singles	Born 19 April 1978	Stands alone
Oldest player in ATP Cup history played a match	42y 9m 18d	Stands alone
Oldest Japanese player winning a Japanese national championship title in any category	44y 6m 11d	Stands alone
Most years btw the 1st and last title at Japanese national championships (in all categories)	17 years (Men's Doubles 2005,2022)	Stands alone
Most years btw the 1st and last title at Japanese national championships in Men's Doubles category	17 years (2005,2022)	Stands alone
Most years btw the 1st and last final at Japanese national championships in Men's Doubles category	17 years (2005,2022)	Stands alone
The longest span btw 2 titles at Japanese national championships in Men's Doubles category	12 years (2009,2021)	Stands alone

== Personal life ==
Based in Kashiwa, Matsui speaks Japanese and English fluently. In 2010, he was married to a former professional tennis player Tomoyo Takagishi, they have 2 children.

== Challenger and Futures finals ==
=== Singles: 11 (2–9) ===
Legend (singles) ATP Challenger Tour (0–1) ITF Futures Tour (2–8)	Titles by surface Hard (2–7) Clay (0–1) Grass (0–0) Carpet (0–1)

Result	W–L	Date	Tournament	Tier	Surface	Opponent	Score
Win	1–0	Sep 2005	Japan F9, Kashiwa	Futures	Hard	(United States) Michael Yani	7–6^{(8–6)}, 6–3
Loss	1–1	Dec 2005	Sri Lanka F2, Colombo	Futures	Clay	(Japan) Go Soeda	6–4, 5–7, 5–7
Loss	1–2	Apr 2006	Chikmagalur, India	Challenger	Hard	(Thailand) Danai Udomchoke	5–7, 4–6
Loss	1–3	Sep 2007	Japan F8, Osaka	Futures	Hard	(Japan) Yuichi Ito	1–6, 6–2, 4–6
Loss	1–4	May 2008	Korea Rep. F2, Changwon	Futures	Hard	(Australia) Matthew Ebden	4–6, 5–7
Loss	1–5	Sep 2009	Great Britain F12, London	Futures	Hard	(United Kingdom) Colin Fleming	6–4, 3–6, 1–6
Loss	1–6	Jun 2010	Japan F7, Tokyo	Futures	Carpet	(Japan) Hiroki Kondo	6–7^{(4–7)}, 6–7^{(5–7)}
Loss	1–7	Dec 2013	Cambodia F3, Phnom Penh	Futures	Hard	(Chinese Taipei) Chen Ti	3–6, 4–6
Win	2–7	May 2014	Thailand F5, Bangkok	Futures	Hard	(Indonesia) Christopher Rungkat	6–4, 6–1
Loss	2–8	Dec 2014	Cambodia F3, Phnom Penh	Futures	Hard	(Chinese Taipei) Huang Liang-chi	5–7, 4–6
Loss	2–9	Jun 2015	Japan F6, Kashiwa	Futures	Hard	(South Korea) Lee Duck-hee	4–6, 2–6

=== Doubles: 50 (23–31) ===
Legend (doubles) ATP Challenger Tour (10–16) ITF Futures Tour (13–15)	Titles by surface Hard (21–30) Clay (1–1) Grass (0–0) Carpet (1–0)

Result	W–L	Date	Tournament	Tier	Surface	Partner	Opponents	Score
Loss	0–1	Sep 2002	Japan F6, Kashiwa	Futures	Hard	(Chinese Taipei) Lu Yen-hsun	(Indonesia) Peter Handoyo (Indonesia) Suwandi Suwandi	3–6, 2–6
Win	1–1	Jun 2003	Busan, Korea, Rep.	Challenger	Hard	(Japan) Michihisa Onoda	(South Korea) Baek Seung-bok (South Korea) Park Seung-kyu	6–1, 6–3
Win	2–1	Jun 2003	Mexico F9, Quintana Roo	Futures	Hard	(Japan) Michihisa Onoda	(Chile) Paul Capdeville (Argentina) Sebastián Decoud	6–3, 6–4
Loss	2–2	May 2007	Korea Rep. F2, Daegu	Futures	Hard	(Japan) Satoshi Iwabuchi	(China) Yu Xinyuan (China) Zeng Shaoxuan	3–6, 7–5, 3–6
Loss	2–3	Nov 2007	Yokohama, Japan	Challenger	Hard	(Japan) Satoshi Iwabuchi	(Japan) Hiroki Kondo (Japan) Go Soeda	7–6^{(7–5)}, 3–6, [9–11]
Loss	2–4	May 2008	Korea Rep. F3, Daegu	Futures	Hard	(Japan) Satoshi Iwabuchi	(South Korea) Kim Young-jun (South Korea) Kwon Oh-hee	6–3, 6–7^{(5–7)}, [7–10]
Loss	2–5	May 2009	Busan, Korea, Rep.	Challenger	Hard	(Japan) Tasuku Iwami	(Thailand) Sanchai Ratiwatana (Thailand) Sonchat Ratiwatana	4–6, 2–6
Win	3–5	May 2010	Fergana, Uzbekistan	Challenger	Hard	(United States) Brendan Evans	(China) Gong Maoxin (China) Li Zhe	3–6, 6–3, [10–8]
Win	4–5	Jun 2010	Guam F1, Tumon	Futures	Hard	(Japan) Tasuku Iwami	(Philippines) Ruben Gonzales (United States) Christian Guevara	3–6, 7–5, [10–4]
Loss	4–6	Apr 2012	China F5, Chengdu	Futures	Hard	(Japan) Yusuke Watanuki	(China) Gao Peng (China) Gao Wan	4–6, 4–6
Loss	4–7	Oct 2012	Japan F9, Ōarai	Futures	Hard	(Chinese Taipei) Yi Chu-huan	(South Korea) An Jae-sung (Japan) Arata Onozawa	6–2, 1–6, [6–10]
Win	5–7	Jan 2013	Nouméa, New Caledonia	Challenger	Hard	(Australia) Sam Groth	(New Zealand) Artem Sitak (New Zealand) Jose Statham	7–6^{(8–6)}, 1–6, [10–4]
Loss	5–8	Jun 2013	India F6, Chennai	Futures	Hard	(Japan) Bumpei Sato	(India) Sriram Balaji (India) Jeevan Nedunchezhiyan	1–6, 4–6
Loss	5–9	Jul 2013	Japan F8, Kashiwa	Futures	Hard	(Japan) Bumpei Sato	(Japan) Hiroki Kondo (New Zealand) Jose Statham	4–6, 2–6
Win	6–9	Jul 2013	Beijing, China, P.R.	Challenger	Hard	(Thailand) Danai Udomchoke	(China) Gong Maoxin (China) Zhang Ze	4–6, 7–6^{(8–6)}, [10–8]
Loss	6–10	Aug 2013	China F6, Zhangjiagang	Futures	Hard	(South Korea) Lim Yong-kyu	(India) Sriram Balaji (India) Ranjeet Virali-Murugesan	5–7, 6–7^{(4–7)}
Loss	6–11	Dec 2013	Cambodia F2, Phnom Penh	Futures	Hard	(Thailand) Danai Udomchoke	(Japan) Takuto Niki (Japan) Arata Onozawa	6–7^{(10–12)}, 6–7^{(8–10)}
Loss	6–12	Feb 2014	Burnie, Australia	Challenger	Hard	(Thailand) Danai Udomchoke	(Australia) Matt Reid (Australia) John-Patrick Smith	4–6, 2–6
Win	7–12	Mar 2014	Japan F1, Tokyo	Futures	Hard	(Japan) Arata Onozawa	(Japan) Shintaro Imai (Japan) Takao Suzuki	6–4, 7–5
Loss	7–13	Mar 2014	Japan F3, Kōfu	Futures	Hard	(Thailand) Danai Udomchoke	(Japan) Takuto Niki (Japan) Arata Onozawa	4–6, 2–6
Win	8–13	Nov 2014	Toyota, Japan	Challenger	Carpet (i)	(Japan) Yasutaka Uchiyama	(Japan) Bumpei Sato (Chinese Taipei) Yang Tsung-hua	7–6^{(8–6)}, 6–2
Loss	8–14	Feb 2015	New Delhi, India	Challenger	Hard	(Italy) Riccardo Ghedin	(Belarus) Egor Gerasimov (Russia) Alexander Kudryavtsev	7–6^{(7–5)}, 4–6, [6–10]
Loss	8–15	Apr 2015	Indonesia F1, Tarakan	Futures	Hard (i)	(Indonesia) Christopher Rungkat	(United States) Matt Seeberger (New Zealand) Finn Tearney	2–6, 6–1, [8–10]
Win	9–15	Apr 2015	Indonesia F2, Tegal	Futures	Hard	(Indonesia) Christopher Rungkat	(Indonesia) Aditya Hari Sasongko (Indonesia) Sunu Wahyu Trijati	6–4, 6–2
Win	10–15	Apr 2015	Indonesia F3, Jakarta	Futures	Hard	(Indonesia) Christopher Rungkat	(India) Jeevan Nedunchezhiyan (Thailand) Danai Udomchoke	6–4, 6–2
Win	11–15	Apr 2015	Thailand F1, Bangkok	Futures	Hard	(Indonesia) Christopher Rungkat	(Thailand) Sanchai Ratiwatana (Thailand) Sonchat Ratiwatana	4–6, 6–3, [10–8]
Win	12–15	Jun 2015	Thailand F4, Bangkok	Futures	Hard	(Indonesia) Christopher Rungkat	(Thailand) Sanchai Ratiwatana (Thailand) Sonchat Ratiwatana	4–6, 6–3, [10–2]
Win	13–15	Aug 2015	Thailand F6, Bangkok	Futures	Hard	(Indonesia) Christopher Rungkat	(Australia) Benjamin Mitchell (Australia) Jordan Thompson	4–6, 6–3, [11–9]
Loss	13–16	Aug 2015	Thailand F7, Bangkok	Futures	Hard	(Indonesia) Christopher Rungkat	(Thailand) Pruchya Isaro (Thailand) Nuttanon Kadchapanan	4–6, 6–7^{(5–7)}
Win	14–16	Mar 2016	Japan F1, Tokyo	Futures	Hard	(Japan) Yuya Kibi	(Chinese Taipei) Huang Liang-chi (New Zealand) Ben McLachlan	6–3, 6–1
Loss	14–17	Mar 2016	Japan F3, Kōfu	Futures	Hard	(Japan) Yuya Kibi	(Japan) Shintaro Imai (Japan) Takuto Niki	1–6, 2–6
Win	15–17	May 2016	Guam F1, Tumon	Futures	Hard	(Australia) Andrew Whittington	(Japan) Sho Katayama (Japan) Yutaro Matsuzaki	6–3, 3–6, [10–8]
Loss	15–18	Jun 2016	Fergana, Uzbekistan	Challenger	Hard	(India) Vishnu Vardhan	(France) Yannick Jankovits (Switzerland) Luca Margaroli	4–6, 6–7^{(4–7)}
Win	16–18	Jun 2017	Japan F6, Karuizawa	Futures	Clay	(Indonesia) Christopher Rungkat	(Japan) Shintaro Imai (Japan) Takuto Niki	7–5, 6–2
Win	17–18	Jul 2017	Astana, Kazakhstan	Challenger	Hard	(India) Vishnu Vardhan	(Russia) Evgeny Karlovskiy (Russia) Evgenii Tiurnev	7–6^{(7–3)}, 6–7^{(5–7)}, [10–7]
Win	18–18	Sep 2017	Shanghai, China, P.R.	Challenger	Hard	(Chinese Taipei) Yi Chu-huan	(United States) Bradley Klahn (Canada) Peter Polansky	7–6^{(7–1)}, 4–6, [10–5]
Win	19–18	May 2018	Seoul, Korea, Rep.	Challenger	Hard	(Denmark) Frederik Nielsen	(Chinese Taipei) Chen Ti (Chinese Taipei) Yi Chu-huan	6–4, 7–6^{(7–3)}
Loss	19–19	Nov 2018	Charlottesville, USA	Challenger	Hard (i)	(Denmark) Frederik Nielsen	(Finland) Harri Heliövaara (Switzerland) Henri Laaksonen	3–6, 4–6
Win	20–19	Nov 2018	Knoxville, USA	Challenger	Hard (i)	(Denmark) Frederik Nielsen	(United States) Hunter Reese (United States) Tennys Sandgren	7–6^{(8–6)}, 7–5
Loss	20–20	May 2019	Busan, Korea, Rep.	Challenger	Hard	(India) Vishnu Vardhan	(Chinese Taipei) Hsieh Cheng-peng (Indonesia) Christopher Rungkat	6–7^{(7–9)}, 1–6
Loss	20–21	Dec 2021	M15 Antalya, Turkey	World Tennis Tour	Clay	(Japan) Kaito Uesugi	(Kazakhstan) Grigoriy Lomakin (Ukraine) Oleg Prihodko	5–7, 6–3, [5–10]
Win	21–21	Jun 2022	M25 Harmon, Guam	World Tennis Tour	Hard	(Japan) Kaito Uesugi	(South Korea) Nam Ji-sung (South Korea) Song Min-kyu	6–3, 0–6, [10–7]
Win	22–21	Sep 2022	Japan M25 Kashiwa Open	World Tennis Tour	Hard	(Japan) Kaito Uesugi	(Japan) Naoki Tajima (Japan) Seita Watanabe	6–3, 4–6, [10–5]
Loss	22–22	Nov 2022	Matsuyama, Japan	Challenger	Hard	(Japan) Kaito Uesugi	(Australia) Andrew Harris (Australia) John-Patrick Smith	3–6, 6–4, [8–10]
Loss	22–23	Jan 2023	Nouméa, New Caledonia	Challenger	Hard	(Japan) Kaito Uesugi	(Northern Mariana Islands) Colin Sinclair (New Zealand) Rubin Statham	4–6, 3–6
Loss	22–24	Feb 2023	Pune, India	Challenger	Hard	(Japan) Kaito Uesugi	(India) Anirudh Chandrasekar (India) Vijay Sundar Prashanth	1–6, 6–4, [3–10]
Loss	22–25	Jun 2023	Palmas del Mar, Puerto Rico	Challenger	Hard	(Japan) Kaito Uesugi	(United States) Evan King (United States) Reese Stalder	6–3, 5–7, [9–11]
Loss	22–26	July 2023	Astana, Kazakhstan	Challenger	Hard	(Japan) Kaito Uesugi	(India) S D Prajwal Dev (India) Niki Kaliyanda Poonacha	3–6, 6–7^{(4–7)}
Win	23–26	Aug 2023	Porto, Portugal	Challenger	Hard	(Japan) Kaito Uesugi	(India) Rithvik Choudary Bollipalli (India) Arjun Kadhe	6–7^{(5–7)}, 6–3, [10–5]
Loss	23–27	Nov 2023	Matsuyama, Japan	Challenger	Hard	(Japan) Kaito Uesugi	(Poland) Karol Drzewiecki (Czech Republic) Zdenek Kolar	3–6, 2–6
Loss	23–28	Jan 2024	Nouméa, New Caledonia	Challenger	Hard	(Australia) Calum Puttergill	(Northern Mariana Islands) Colin Sinclair (New Zealand) Rubin Statham	5–7, 2–6
Loss	23–29	May 2024	Wuxi, China	Challenger	Hard	(Japan) Kaito Uesugi	(United States) Reese Stalder (Australia) Calum Puttergill	6–7^{(8–10)}, 6–7^{(4–7)}
Loss	23–30	May 2024	Taipei, Taiwan	Challenger	Hard	(Japan) Kaito Uesugi	(Chinese Taipei) Ray Ho (South Korea) Nam Ji-sung	2–6, 2–6
Loss	23–31	Jun 2025	M15 Harmon, Guam	World Tennis Tour	Hard	(Japan) Masakatsu Noguchi	(Japan) Yusuke Kusuhara (Japan) Shunsuke Nakagawa	2–6, 4–6
