= Nicolas Moreno de Alboran =

American tennis player (born 1997)

- Moreno de Alboran at the 2026 Wimbledon Championships
- Country (sports): United States
- Residence: Madrid, Spain
- Born: July 14, 1997 (age 29) New York City, NY, US
- Height: 6 ft 1 in (1.85 m)
- Turned pro: 2019
- Retired: 2026
- Plays: Right-handed (two-handed backhand)
- College: UC Santa Barbara
- Coach: Glenn Kuma-Mintah
- Prize money: US $1,054,212

Singles
- Career record: 6–12
- Career titles: 0
- Highest ranking: No. 107 (January 6, 2025)

Grand Slam singles results
- Australian Open: Q1 (2023, 2024, 2026)
- French Open: 1R (2024)
- Wimbledon: Q3 (2022)
- US Open: 1R (2023)

Doubles
- Career record: 0–1
- Career titles: 0
- Highest ranking: No. 301 (June 30, 2025)

Grand Slam doubles results
- US Open: 1R (2023)

Nicolas Moreno de Alboran (Spanish: Nicolás Moreno de Alborán; born July 14, 1997) is a former American professional tennis player. He has a career-high ATP singles ranking of No. 107 achieved on January 6, 2025 and a doubles ranking of No. 301, reached on June 30, 2025.

Moreno de Alboran plays mostly on the ATP Challenger Tour, where he has won three titles in singles and one in doubles.

== Career ==
=== 2018–2019: College years ===
Moreno de Alboran played collegiate tennis for University of California, Santa Barbara, and he made sporadic appearances on the ITF circuit.

=== 2019–2021: Turned professional ===
He turned professional in 2019, and following a period of inactivity caused by the Covid-19 pandemic, he progressed to regular appearances on the ATP Challenger Tour during the second half of the 2021 season.

=== 2022–2023: First Challenger title, ATP, Major and top 125 debuts ===
He won his first Challenger title at the 2022 Braga Open in Portugal.

He reached the top 200 at world No. 188 on February 20, 2023, following a third Challenger final at the Chennai Open where he lost to Max Purcell. He reached the top 150 on June 12, 2023, following his second Challenger title at the 2023 Tyler Tennis Championships.

Ranked No. 131, he made his Grand Slam tournament debut at the 2023 US Open after qualifying. He also qualified for the 2023 Sofia Open, making his ATP debut, entering the main draw as lucky loser but lost to Jurij Rodionov.

=== 2024: First ATP wins & quarterfinals, Masters & top 110 debuts ===
Moreno Alboran qualified for the 2024 Dallas Open defeating Denis Kudla in the last round of qualifying. He also qualified for the next tournament, the 2024 Delray Beach Open defeating top seed Flavio Cobolli in the last qualifying round. He won his first main draw ATP match over compatriot Aleksandar Kovacevic. He qualified for the 2024 BNP Paribas Open in Indian Wells making his Masters debut.

At the beginning of the clay court season he also qualified for the 2024 Grand Prix Hassan II and defeated fifth seed Facundo Díaz Acosta and David Goffin to reach his first ATP quarterfinal of his career.

He qualified into the main draw of the Italian Open making his debut at his first Masters on clay. He also qualified for the main draw at the 2024 Geneva Open and defeated again fellow qualifier David Goffin.

Moreno Alboran earned the USTA's reciprocal wildcard for the 2024 French Open after winning the men's Roland Garros Wild Card Challenge, where he made his debut at this Major.

Moreno de Alboran qualified for the main draw 2024 Swiss Open Gstaad but lost to Yannick Hanfmann. He received a wildcard for the main draw at the 2024 Generali Open Kitzbühel and defeated qualifier Andrea Collarini in the first round and fellow wildcard Lukas Neumayer in the second to reach his second career quarterfinal.

Following a final at the Villena Open where he lost to Kamil Majchrzak and his third title in Matsuyama, he finished the season ranked at a career-high singles ranking of world No. 109 on 18 November 2024.

=== 2026: Retirement ===
On November 8, 2026, he announced his retirement from professional tennis through a heartfelt letter on his instagram account.

== Personal life ==
Moreno de Alboran, a Spanish-American, was born in New York City. He moved to London as a teenager, where he attended Ibstock Place School in Roehampton, finishing in 2015. He trained at Dukes Meadows in Chiswick and represented Spain in junior events, then switched to the United States. He also played rugby and soccer while growing up.

Moreno de Alboran was a collegiate tennis player for UC Santa Barbara, where he was highly successful and ranked among the top 10 college players in the country during his senior year. He studied Environmental Science.

== Performance timeline ==
Key
W	F	SF	QF	#R	RR	Q#	DNQ	A	NH

(W) winner; (F) finalist; (SF) semifinalist; (QF) quarterfinalist; (#R) rounds 4, 3, 2, 1; (RR) round-robin stage; (Q#) qualification round; (DNQ) did not qualify; (A) absent; (NH) not held; (SR) strike rate (events won / competed); (W–L) win–loss record.

=== Singles ===
Tournament	2021	2022	2023	2024	2025	2026	SR	W–L	Win %
Grand Slams
Australian Open	A	A	Q1	Q1	A	Q1	0 / 0	0–0	–
French Open	A	A	Q3	1R	Q2	Q1	0 / 1	0–1	0%
Wimbledon	A	Q3	Q1	Q2	A	Q1	0 / 0	0–0	–
US Open	Q1	A	1R	Q1	A		0 / 1	0–1	0%
Win–loss	0–0	0–0	0–1	0–1	0–0	0–0	0 / 2	0–2	0%
ATP Masters 1000
Indian Wells Masters	A	A	A	1R	A		0 / 1	0–1	0%
Miami Open	A	A	Q1	A	A		0 / 0	0–0	–
Monte Carlo Masters	A	A	A	A	A		0 / 0	0–0	–
Madrid Open	A	A	A	A	Q1		0 / 0	0-0	–
Italian Open	A	A	A	1R	1R		0 / 2	0–2	0%
Canadian Open	A	A	A	A	A		0 / 0	0–0	–
Cincinnati Masters	A	A	A	A	A		0 / 0	0–0	–
Shanghai Masters	NH		A	A	A		0 / 0	0–0	–
Paris Masters	A	A	A	A	A		0 / 0	0–0	–
Win–loss	0–0	0–0	0–0	0–2	0–1	0–0	0 / 3	0–3	0%

== ATP Challenger and ITF Tour finals ==
=== Singles: 15 (6 titles, 9 runner-ups) ===
Legend ATP Challenger Tour (3–4) ITF WTT (3–5)	Finals by surface Hard (3–6) Clay (3–3)

Result	W–L	Date	Tournament	Tier	Surface	Opponent	Score
Loss	0–1	Apr 2022	Challenger ATP de Salinas Diario Expreso, Ecuador	Challenger	Hard	(Ecuador) Emilio Gómez	7–6^{(7–2)}, 6–7^{(4–7)}, 5–7
Win	1–1	Sep 2022	Braga Open, Portugal	Challenger	Clay	(Brazil) Matheus Pucinelli de Almeida	6–2, 6–4
Loss	1–2	Feb 2023	Chennai Open Challenger, India	Challenger	Hard	(Australia) Max Purcell	7–5, 6–7^{(2–7)}, 4–6
Win	2–2	Jun 2023	Tyler Tennis Championships, US	Challenger	Hard	(Kazakhstan) Mikhail Kukushkin	6–7^{(8–10)}, 7–6^{(7–0)}, 6–4
Loss	2–3	Aug 2023	Cary Challenger, US	Challenger	Hard	(Australia) Adam Walton	4–6, 6–3, 5–7
Loss	2–4	Sep 2024	Villena Open, Spain	Challenger	Hard	(Poland) Kamil Majchrzak	4–6, 2–6
Win	3–4	Nov 2024	Matsuyama Challenger, Japan	Challenger	Hard	(Australia) Alex Bolt	7–6^{(7–4)}, 6–2

Result	W–L	Date	Tournament	Tier	Surface	Opponent	Score
Loss	0–1	Jul 2019	M15 Cancún, Mexico	WTT	Hard	(Colombia) Nicolás Mejía	2–6, 5–7
Loss	0–2	Oct 2019	M15 Tabarka, Tunisia	WTT	Clay	(Argentina) Ignacio Monzón	3–6, 1–6
Loss	0–3	Jan 2021	M15 Cairo, Egypt	WTT	Clay	(Chile) Gonzalo Lama	0–6, 0–6
Loss	0–4	May 2021	M15 Antalya, Turkey	WTT	Clay	(Dominican Republic) Nick Hardt	6–2, 5–7, 1–6
Win	1–4	May 2021	M15 Antalya, Turkey	WTT	Clay	(Italy) Giovanni Fonio	7–5, 6–4
Win	2–4	Jun 2021	M25 Klosters, Switzerland	WTT	Clay	(Italy) Francesco Forti	6–4, 6–3
Win	3–4	Jul 2021	M25 Idanha-a-Nova, Portugal	WTT	Hard	(United States) Zane Khan	1–0 ret.
Loss	3–5	Sep 2022	M25 Madrid, Spain	WTT	Hard	(Austria) Lukas Neumayer	4–6, 1–6

=== Doubles: 9 (6 titles, 3 runner-ups) ===
Legend ATP Challenger Tour (1–2) ITF WTT (5–1)	Finals by surface Hard (4–2) Clay (2–1)

Result	W–L	Date	Tournament	Tier	Surface	Partner	Opponents	Score
Loss	0–1	May 2023	Little Rock Challenger, US	Challenger	Hard	(Canada) Alexis Galarneau	(South Korea) Nam Ji-sung (New Zealand) Artem Sitak	4–6, 4–6
Win	1–1	Jul 2024	Ion Țiriac Challenger, Romania	Challenger	Clay	(Spain) Javier Barranco Cosano	(Poland) Karol Drzewiecki (Poland) Piotr Matuszewski	3–6, 6–1, [17–15]
Loss	1–2	Nov 2024	Matsuyama Challenger, Japan	Challenger	Hard	(New Zealand) Rubin Statham	(Japan) Seita Watanabe (Japan) Takeru Yuzuki	4–6, 3–6

Result	W–L	Date	Tournament	Tier	Surface	Partner	Opponents	Score
Win	1–0	Sep 2019	M15 São Brás de Alportel, Portugal	WTT	Hard	(Sweden) Simon Freund	(Portugal) Francisco Cabral (United Kingdom) Luke Johnson	5–7, 6–4, [10–7]
Loss	1–1	Oct 2019	M15 Tabarka, Tunisia	WTT	Clay	(Serbia) Boris Butulija	(Argentina) Ignacio Monzón (Argentina) Fermín Tenti	defaulted
Win	2–1	Mar 2020	M15 Faro, Portugal	WTT	Hard	(Germany) Fabian Fallert	(Poland) Michał Dembek (Portugal) Gonçalo Falcão	6–3, 6–4
Win	3–1	Sep 2020	M15 Sintra, Portugal	WTT	Hard	(Germany) Fabian Fallert	(Russia) Savriyan Danilov (Dominican Republic) Nick Hardt	7–6^{(7–4)}, 6–4
Win	4–1	Feb 2021	M15 Sharm El Sheikh, Egypt	WTT	Hard	(Dominican Republic) Nick Hardt	(Belgium) Arnaud Bovy (United Kingdom) Aidan McHugh	6–3, 6–4
Win	5–1	Jun 2021	M25 Klosters, Switzerland	WTT	Clay	(Germany) Fabian Fallert	(Switzerland) Leandro Riedi (Switzerland) Dominic Stricker	4–6, 7–6^{(7–1)}, [10–6]
