= Kaito Uesugi =

Japanese tennis player (born 1995)

- Country (sports): Japan
- Born: 2 June 1995 (age 31) Sakai, Japan
- Height: 1.80 m (5 ft 11 in)
- Turned pro: April 2018
- Plays: Right-handed (two-handed backhand)
- Prize money: US $203,219

Singles
- Career record: 0–0 (at ATP Tour level, Grand Slam level, and in Davis Cup)
- Career titles: 0
- Highest ranking: No. 650 (27 August 2018)
- Current ranking: No. 1,333 (2 November 2026)

Doubles
- Career record: 4–8 (at ATP Tour level, Grand Slam level, and in Davis Cup)
- Career titles: 10 ITF
- Highest ranking: No. 80 (2 November 2026)
- Current ranking: No. 80 (2 November 2026)
- Last updated on: 2 November 2026.

Kaito Uesugi (上杉 海斗, Uesugi Kaito; born 2 June 1995) is a Japanese tennis player. He has a career high ATP doubles ranking of world No. 80 achieved on 2 November 2026 and a singles ranking of No. 650 achieved on 27 August 2018.

== Career ==
Uesugi made his ATP main draw debut at the 2018 Rakuten Japan Open Tennis Championships in the doubles draw partnering Yoshihito Nishioka.

== ATP Challenger and ITF Tour finals ==
=== Singles: 1 (0–1) ===
Legend (singles) ATP Challenger Tour (0–0) ITF Futures Tour (0–1)	Titles by surface Hard (0–1) Clay (0–0) Grass (0–0) Carpet (0–0)

Result	W–L	Date	Tournament	Tier	Surface	Opponent	Score
Loss	0–1	Aug 2018	Indonesia F2, Jakarta	Futures	Hard	(Australia) Jeremy Beale	2–6, 2–6

=== Doubles: 40 (22–18) ===
Legend (doubles) ATP Challenger Tour (8–11) ITF Futures Tour (14–7)	Titles by surface Hard (18–15) Clay (4–2) Grass (0–0) Carpet (0–1)

Result	W–L	Date	Tournament	Tier	Surface	Partner	Opponents	Score
Loss	0–1	Jun 2016	Japan F8, Akishima	Futures	Carpet	(Japan) Yuichi Ito	(Japan) Katsuki Nagao (Japan) Hiromasa Oku	4–6, 2–6
Loss	0–2	Mar 2017	Japan F1, Nishitama	Futures	Hard	(Japan) Takuto Niki	(Japan) Katsuki Nagao (Japan) Hiromasa Oku	0–6, 6–7^{(2–7)}
Win	1–2	Mar 2017	Japan F2, Nishitōkyō	Futures	Hard	(Japan) Takuto Niki	(Japan) Gengo Kikuchi (Japan) Shunrou Takeshima	7–6^{(7–5)}, 6–7^{(2–7)}, [10–3]
Loss	1–3	Apr 2017	Japan F4, Tsukuba	Futures	Hard	(Japan) Shintaro Imai	(Japan) Hiroyasu Ehara (Japan) Sho Katayama	6–2, 3–6, [6–10]
Win	2–3	Jul 2018	Hong Kong F2, Hong Kong	Futures	Hard	(Japan) Yuta Shimizu	(Thailand) Congsup Congcar (Japan) Issei Okamura	7–5, 6–0
Win	3–3	Aug 2018	Indonesia F2, Jakarta	Futures	Hard	(Japan) Sho Shimabukuro	(South Korea) Kim Cheong-eui (Indonesia) David Agung Susanto	6–3, 7–6^{(7–4)}
Loss	3–4	Aug 2018	Indonesia F3, Jakarta	Futures	Hard	(Philippines) Francis Alcantara	(Indonesia) Justin Barki (Indonesia) Christopher Rungkat	3–6, 2–6
Win	4–4	Feb 2021	Egypt, Sharm El Sheikh	Futures	Hard	(Japan) Shintaro Imai	(Chinese Taipei) Yu Hsiou Hsu (Japan) Jumpei Yamasaki	7–6^{(7–4)}, 6–4
Loss	4–5	Jul 2021	Portugal, Idanha-a-Nova	Futures	Hard	(Japan) Takuto Niki	(Australia) Thomas Fancutt (United Kingdom) Evan Hoyt	3–6, 2–6
Loss	4–6	Dec 2021	Turkey, Antalya	Futures	Clay	(Japan) Toshihide Matsui	(Kazakhstan) Grigoriy Lomakin (Ukraine) Oleg Prihodko	5–7, 6–3, [5-10]
Win	5–6	Jan 2022	Tunesia, Monastir	Futures	Hard	(Japan) Naoki Tajima	(Belgium) Loic Cloes (Ukraine) Marat Deviatiarov	(W/O)
Win	6–6	Jan 2022	Tunesia, Monastir	Futures	Hard	(Japan) Naoki Tajima	(France) Martin Breysach (France) Arthur Bouquier	6–2, 7–6 ^{7–5}
Win	7–6	Feb 2022	Tunesia, Monastir	Futures	Hard	(Japan) Jumpei Yamasaki	(Netherlands) Sidane Pontjodikromo (Italy) Alexander Weis	6–1, 6–1
Win	8–6	Feb 2022	Tunesia, Monastir	Futures	Hard	(Japan) Shinji Hazawa	(Spain) Alberto Barroso Campos (Spain) Imanol Lopez Morillo	7–6^{7–5}, 6–4
Win	9–6	Apr 2022	Turkey, Antalya	Futures	Clay	(Japan) Yuki Mochizuki	(Germany) Timo Stodder (United States) Fletcher Scott	6–4, 1–6, [10–8]
Loss	9–7	Apr 2022	Turkey, Antalya	Futures	Clay	(Japan) Yuki Mochizuki	(Japan) Rimpei Kawakami (Japan) Gengo Kikuchi	6–1, 6–7^{6–8}, [3–10]
Win	10–7	Apr 2022	Turkey, Antalya	Futures	Hard	(Japan) Yuki Mochizuki	(Switzerland) Nicolás Parizzia (Switzerland) Damien Wenger	6–4, 6–4
Win	11–7	Jun 2022	M25 Harmon, Guam	World Tennis Tour	Hard	(Japan) Toshihide Matsui	(South Korea) Nam Ji-sung (South Korea) Song Min-kyu	6-3, 0–6, [10–7]
Win	12–7	Sep 2022	M25 Kashiwa, Japan	World Tennis Tour	Hard	(Japan) Toshihide Matsui	(Japan) Naoki Tajima (Japan) Seita Watanabe	6-3, 4–6, [10–5]
Loss	12–8	Nov 2022	Matsuyama, Japan	Challenger	Hard	(Japan) Toshihide Matsui	(Australia) Andrew Harris (Australia) John-Patrick Smith	3–6, 6–4, [8–10]
Loss	12–9	Jan 2023	Nouméa, New Caledonia	Challenger	Hard	(Japan) Toshihide Matsui	(Northern Mariana Islands) Colin Sinclair (New Zealand) Rubin Statham	4–6, 3–6
Loss	12–10	Feb 2023	Puna, India	Challenger	Hard	(Japan) Toshihide Matsui	(India) Anirudh Chandrasekar (India) Vijay Sundar Prashanth	1–6, 6–4, [3–10]
Loss	12–11	Jun 2023	Palmas del Mar, Puerto Rico	Challenger	Hard	(Japan) Toshihide Matsui	(United States) Evan King (United States) Reese Stalder	6-3, 5–7, [9–11]
Loss	12–12	July 2023	Astana, Kazakhstan	Challenger	Hard	(Japan) Toshihide Matsui	(India) S D Prajwal Dev (India) Niki Kaliyanda Poonacha	6-3, 7-6^{(4–7)}
Win	13–12	Aug 2023	Porto, Portugal	Challenger	Hard	(Japan) Toshihide Matsui	(India) Rithvik Choudary Bollipalli (India) Arjun Kadhe	6-7^{(5–7)}, 6–3, [10–5]
Loss	13–13	Nov 2023	Matsuyama, Japan	Challenger	Hard	(Japan) Toshihide Matsui	(Poland) Karol Drzewiecki (Czech Republic) Zdenek Kolar	3–6, 2–6
Loss	13–14	May 2024	Wuxi, China	Challenger	Hard	(Japan) Toshihide Matsui	(United States) Reese Stalder (Australia) Calum Puttergill	6–7^{(8–10)}, 6–7^{(4–7)}
Loss	13–15	May 2024	Taipei, Taiwan	Challenger	Hard	(Japan) Toshihide Matsui	(Chinese Taipei) Ray Ho (South Korea) Nam Ji-sung	2–6, 2–6
Win	14–15	Feb 2025	Chennai, India	Challenger	Hard	(Japan) Shintaro Mochizuki	(India) Saketh Myneni (India) Ramkumar Ramanathan	6–4, 6–4
Win	15–15	Mar 2025	M15 Nishitokyo, Japan	World Tennis Tour	Hard	(South Korea) Nam Ji-sung	(Japan) Yusuke Kusuhara (Japan) Shunsuke Nakagawa	6-3, 6–1
Loss	15–16	Sep 2025	Guangzhou, China	Challenger	Hard	(Japan) Seita Watanabe	(Australia) Matthew Romios (United States) Ryan Seggerman	1–6, 3–6
Loss	15–17	Nov 2025	Taipei, Taiwan	Challenger	Hard	(Japan) Seita Watanabe	(United States) Nathaniel Lammons (Netherlands) Jean-Julien Rojer	6–7^{(4–7)}, 6–7^{(6–8)}
Win	16–17	Jan 2026	Phan Thiết, Vietnam	Challenger	Hard	(Japan) James Trotter	(United States) George Goldhoff (United States) Reese Stalder	6–3, 5–7, [10–4]
Win	17–17	Mar 2026	M15 Hinode, Japan	World Tennis Tour	Hard	(Chinese Taipei) Jason Jung	(Japan) Shinji Hazawa (Japan) Masamichi Imamura	5–7, 7–5, [10–7]
Win	18–17	Apr 2026	Wuning, China	Challenger	Hard	(Chinese Taipei) Jason Jung	(United States) Keegan Smith (China) Zheng Baoluo	6–7^{(3–7)}, 6–3, [10–6]
Win	19–17	Jun 2026	Bad Rappenau, Germany	Challenger	Clay	(Chinese Taipei) Jason Jung	(Germany) Tim Rühl (Netherlands) Mick Veldheer	7–6^{(7–4)}, 2–6, [12–10]
Win	20–17	Jun 2026	Târgu Mureș, Romania	Challenger	Clay	(Netherlands) Thijmen Loof	(Serbia) Stefan Latinović (Czech Republic) Michael Vrbenský	2–6, 7–6^{(7–0)}, [10–6]
Win	21–17	Jul 2026	Zug, Switzerland	Challenger	Clay	(Netherlands) Thijmen Loof	(Czech Republic) Andrew Paulson (Czech Republic) David Poljak	6–4, 6–2
Loss	21–18	Oct 2026	Jinan, China	Challenger	Hard	(Netherlands) Thijmen Loof	(Japan) Jay Friend (Chinese Taipei) Ray Ho	6–2, 6–7^{(5–7)}, [4–10]
Win	22–18	Oct 2026	Guangzhou, China	Challenger	Hard	(Netherlands) Thijmen Loof	(Chinese Taipei) Hsu Yu-hsiou (China) Sun Fajing	6–2, 6–2
