= Hong Seong-chan =

South Korean tennis player

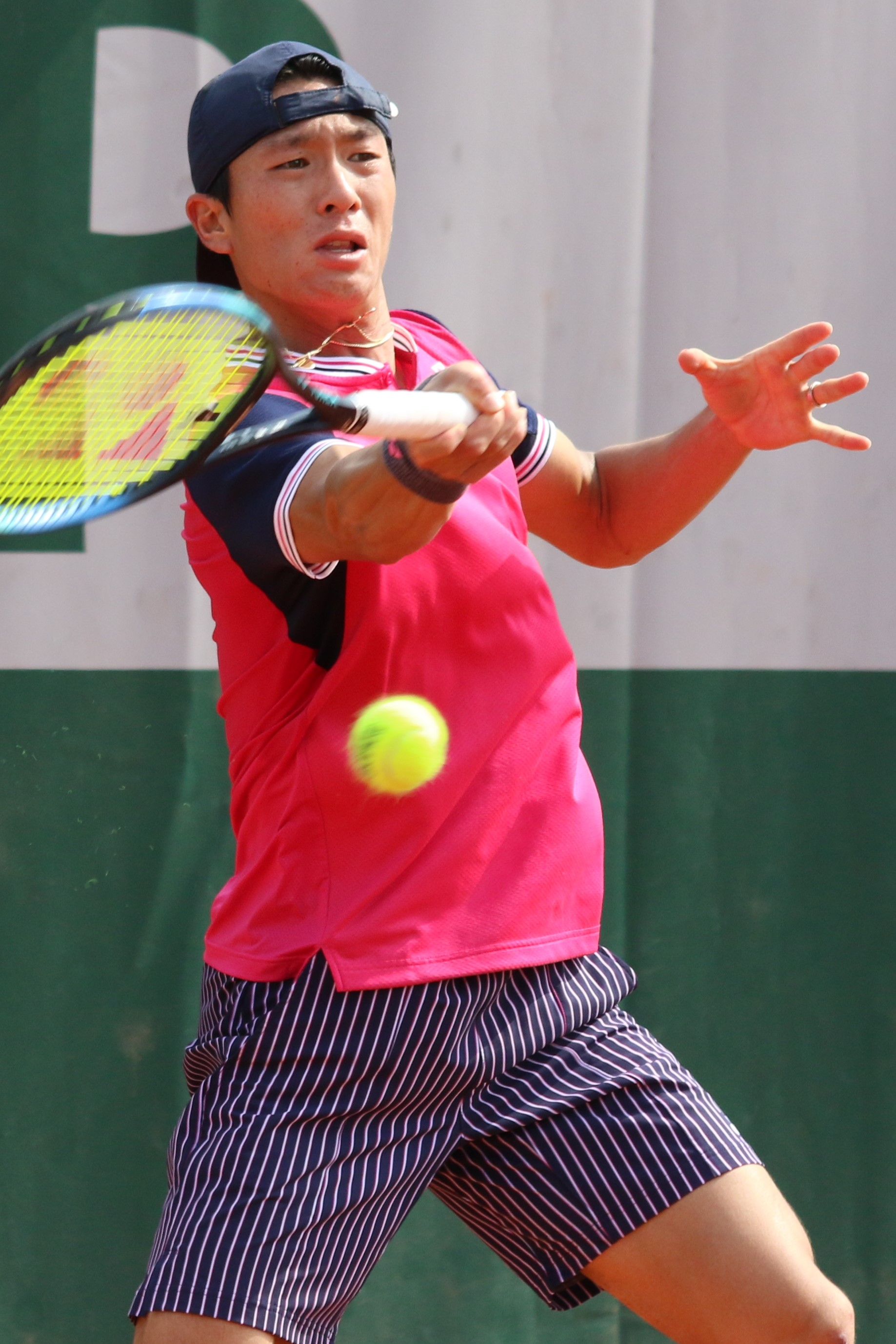
- Hong at the 2023 French Open
- Country (sports): South Korea
- Residence: Gangwondo, South Korea
- Born: 30 June 1997 (age 29) Gangwondo, South Korea
- Height: 1.75 m (5 ft 9 in)
- Plays: Right-handed (two handed-backhand)
- Prize money: US $468,818

Singles
- Career record: 6–18
- Career titles: 0
- Highest ranking: No. 139 (16 September 2024)
- Current ranking: No. 1078 (28 September 2026)

Grand Slam singles results
- French Open: Q1 (2023, 2024)
- Wimbledon: Q1 (2023, 2024)
- US Open: Q2 (2023, 2024, 2026)

Doubles
- Career record: 0–2
- Career titles: 0
- Highest ranking: No. 359 (16 January 2023)
Medal record
Men's tennis
Representing South Korea
Asian Games
Bronze medal – third place	2022 Hangzhou	Singles
Bronze medal – third place	2022 Hangzhou	Doubles
- Last updated on: 1 September 2026.

- Hong Seong-chan
- Hangul: 홍성찬
- RR: Hong Seongchan
- MR: Hong Sŏngch'an

Hong Seong-chan (Korean: 홍성찬, born 30 June 1997) is a South Korean tennis player. Hong has a career high ATP singles ranking of world No. 139 achieved on 26 September 2024 and a doubles ranking of No. 359 achieved on 16 January 2023. He is the former Korean No. 1 singles player.

Since 2015, Hong has been a member of the South Korean Davis Cup team.

== Career ==
=== Juniors ===
Hong reached the final of the 2015 Australian Open junior championships, falling to top seed Roman Safiullin in the final.

Hong had a career high junior ranking of No. 3.

=== 2022: Maiden Challenger title ===
He lifted his maiden trophy at the 2022 Matsuyama Challenger.

=== 2023–2024: Masters debut, Three Challenger finals, top 150 ===
He reached the last round of qualifying at the 2023 Rolex Shanghai Masters.

Ranked No. 227, he qualified for the 2024 BNP Paribas Open having entered the qualifying competition as an alternate after Yosuke Watanuki‘s withdrawal, making his Masters debut.

Ranked No. 175 he qualified for the ATP 500 Citi DC Open in Washington and defeated Adam Walton and upset third seed Karen Khachanov, for his first top 30 win.

Following his semifinal showing at the 2024 International Challenger Zhangjiagang, he reached a career-high ranking of No. 139 on 16 September 2024.

== Performance timeline ==
Key
W	F	SF	QF	#R	RR	Q#	DNQ	A	NH

(W) winner; (F) finalist; (SF) semifinalist; (QF) quarterfinalist; (#R) rounds 4, 3, 2, 1; (RR) round-robin stage; (Q#) qualification round; (DNQ) did not qualify; (A) absent; (NH) not held; (SR) strike rate (events won / competed); (W–L) win–loss record.

=== Singles ===
Tournament	2023	2024	2025	2026	SR	W–L	Win%
Grand Slam tournaments
Australian Open	A	A		A	0 / 0	0–0	–
French Open	Q1	Q1	A	A	0 / 0	0–0	–
Wimbledon	Q1	Q1	A	A	0 / 0	0-0	–
US Open	Q2	Q2	A	Q2	0 / 0	0-0	–
Win–loss	0–0	0–0	0–0	0-0	0 / 0	0-0	–

== ATP Challenger and ITF Tour Finals ==
=== Singles: 23 (15–8) ===
Legend ATP Challenger Tour (1–3) ITF Futures/World Tennis Tour (14–5)	Finals by surface Hard (14–8) Clay (1–0)

Result	W–L	Date	Tournament	Tier	Surface	Opponent	Score
Loss	0–1	Dec 2015	Qatar F5, Doha	Futures	Hard	(Belgium) Joris De Loore	3–6, 2–6
Loss	0–2	Jan 2016	Turkey F4, Antalya	Futures	Hard	(Belgium) Joris De Loore	4–6, 2–6
Win	1–2	Feb 2016	Turkey F5, Antalya	Futures	Hard	(Russia) Roman Safiullin	6–2, 7–5
Win	2–2	Feb 2016	Turkey F6, Antalya	Futures	Hard	(Portugal) Frederico Ferreira Silva	7–5, 6–4
Win	3–2	Feb 2016	Turkey F7, Antalya	Futures	Hard	(Bulgaria) Dimitar Kuzmanov	6–4, 6–3
Win	4–2	Jul 2016	Vietnam F1, Thủ Dầu Một	Futures	Hard	(India) Rishab Agarwal	6–1, 6–2
Win	5–2	Aug 2016	Vietnam F3, Thủ Dầu Một	Futures	Hard	(Australia) Jacob Grills	6–1, 6–7^{(4–7)}, 6–0
Loss	5–3	Sep 2016	Thailand F2, Hua Hin	Futures	Hard	(India) Sriram Balaji	4–6, 6–7^{(3–7)}
Loss	5–4	Jun 2017	Korea F1, Sangju	Futures	Hard	(United States) Daniel Nguyen	4–6, 7–5, 2–6
Win	6–4	Mar 2018	Japan F3, Kofu	Futures	Hard	(Japan) Makoto Ochi	7–6, 6–1
Win	7–4	Mar 2019	M15 Nishi-Tokyo, Japan	World Tennis Tour	Hard	(Japan) Shuichi Sekiguchi	7–6^{(7–2)}, 6–4
Win	8–4	Jun 2019	M15 Daegu, South Korea	World Tennis Tour	Hard	(South Korea) Na Jung-woong	6–0, 6–3
Win	9–4	Jun 2019	M15 Gimcheon, South Korea	World Tennis Tour	Hard	(Japan) Yuta Shimizu	6–1, 5–7, 6–2
Win	10–4	Aug 2019	M15 Hua Hin, Thailand	World Tennis Tour	Hard	(Australia) Dayne Kelly	7–5, 6–3
Win	11–4	Apr 2021	M15 Antalya, Turkey	World Tennis Tour	Clay	(Uzbekistan) Sanjar Fayziev	6–1, 6–3
Win	12–4	Jul 2021	M15 Monastir, Tunisia	World Tennis Tour	Hard	(Italy) Luca Giacomini	7–5, 6–3
Win	13–4	Apr 2022	M15 Chiang Rai, Thailand	World Tennis Tour	Hard	(Vietnam) Lý Hoàng Nam	6–3, 3–6, 7–5
Win	14–4	Jun 2022	M25 Tamuning, Guam	World Tennis Tour	Hard	(Japan) Rio Noguchi	6–3, 6–2
Loss	14–5	Jun 2022	M25 Tamuning, Guam	World Tennis Tour	Hard	(Japan) Sho Shimabukuro	6–3, 4–6, 1–6
Win	15–5	Nov 2022	Matsuyama, Japan	Challenger	Hard	(Chinese Taipei) Wu Tung-lin	6–3, 6–2
Loss	15–6	Jan 2024	Nonthaburi, Thailand	Challenger	Hard	(Italy) Matteo Gigante	4–6, 1–6
Loss	15–7	Feb 2024	Bangalore, India	Challenger	Hard	(Italy) Stefano Napolitano	6–4, 3–6, 3–6
Loss	15–8	Apr 2024	Busan, South Korea	Challenger	Hard	(Japan) Yasutaka Uchiyama	6–7^{(4–7)}, 3–6

=== Doubles (8–2) ===
Legend
Grand Slam
ATP Masters Series
ATP Tour
Challengers
ITF Futures (8–2)

Outcome	Date	Tournament	Surface	Partner	Opponent	Score
Win	24 May 2015	Daegu, South Korea	Hard	(South Korea) Lee Hyung-taik	(South Korea) Nam Ji-sung (South Korea) Song Min-kyu	6–3, 6–3
Loss	5 March 2017	Antalya, Turkey	Hard	(Zimbabwe) Benjamin Lock	(Brazil) Pedro Bernardi (Guatemala) Christopher Díaz Figueroa	6–2, 2–6, 10–12
Loss	11 June 2017	Gimcheon, South Korea	Hard	(South Korea) Kim Young-seok	(South Korea) Kim Hyun-joon (South Korea) Noh Sang-woo	6–2, 1–6, 12–14
Win	23 June 2018	Daegu, South Korea	Hard	(South Korea) Chung Yun-seong	(South Korea) Kwon Soon-woo (South Korea) Lim Yong-kyu	W/O
Win	1 September 2019	Hua Hin, Thailand	Hard	(South Korea) Shin San-hui	(Chinese Taipei) Hsu Yu-hsiou (Chinese Taipei) Lin Wei-de	6–4, 6–4
Win	19 June 2021	Monastir, Tunisia	Hard	(South Korea) Nam Ji-sung	(Argentina) Matias Franco Descotte (Canada) Filip Peliwo	6–3, 6–1
Win	3 July 2021	Monastir, Tunisia	Hard	(South Korea) Nam Ji-sung	(Russia) Timur Kiyamov (Canada) Kelsey Stevenson	6–2, 6–4
Win	23 January 2022	Antalya, Turkey	Clay	(South Korea) Nam Ji-sung	(Sweden) Dragoș Nicolae Mădăraș (Ukraine) Oleksandr Ovcharenko	6–3, 6–3
Win	6 February 2022	Antalya, Turkey	Clay	(South Korea) Nam Ji-sung	(Turkey) Sarp Ağabigün (Romania) Mircea-Alexandru Jecan	6–4, 6–4
Win	6 April 2022	Chiang Rai, Thailand	Hard	(South Korea) Kim Cheong-eui	(South Korea) Nam Ji-sung (South Korea) Song Min-kyu	4–6, 7–6^{(7–2)}, 10–8

== Junior Grand Slam finals ==
=== Singles: 1 (1 runner-up) ===
Outcome	Year	Championship	Surface	Opponent	Score
Loss	2015	Australian Open	Hard	(Russia) Roman Safiullin	5–7, 6–7^{(2–7)}
