= James Watt (tennis) =

New Zealand tennis player (born 2000)

- Country (sports): New Zealand
- Born: 9 June 2000 (age 26) Hamilton, New Zealand
- Height: 2.06 m (6 ft 9 in)
- Plays: Right-handed, two-handed backhand
- College: Saint Mary's College of California
- Coach: Kane Newland
- Prize money: US $187,582

Singles
- Career record: 3-3 (at ATP Tour level, Grand Slam level, and in Davis Cup)
- Career titles: 0
- Highest ranking: No. 569 (8 September 2025)
- Current ranking: No. 967 (16 November 2026)

Doubles
- Career record: 9-10 (at ATP Tour level, Grand Slam level, and in Davis Cup)
- Career titles: 0; 7 Challenger, 3 ITF Tour
- Highest ranking: No. 71 (16 November 2026)
- Current ranking: No. 71 (16 November 2026)

Grand Slam doubles results
- French Open: 1R (2026)
- US Open: 1R (2026)
- Last updated on: 16 November 2026.

James Watt (born 9 June 2000) is a New Zealand tennis player. He has a career-high singles ranking of No. 569 achieved on 8 September 2025, and a career-high doubles ranking of No. 71 achieved on 16 November 2026.

James was educated at Timaru Boys' High School. He attended Saint Mary's College of California in the United States.

== Career ==
In July 2023, playing alongside compatriot Isaac Becroft, he won the men's doubles title at the Caloundra International (M15) event on the Sunshine Coast in Queensland.

In September 2024, he lost in the final of the singles at the Darwin Tennis International in Darwin, Australia going three sets against Omar Jasika, a player ranked over 1100 places higher than him in the rankings. In October 2024, he won the doubles $25,000 ITF tournament in Cairns, Australia alongside Matt Hulme.

In January 2025, he was awarded a wildcard into the main draw of the men's doubles at the 2025 ASB Classic in Auckland, alongside Marcus Daniell where they were drawn against Roberto Carballes Baena and Luciano Darderi in the first round. In June, playing alongside Finn Reynolds, he won his first doubles Challenger title in Tyler, Texas, defeating Alex Martinez and Adrià Soriano Barrera in the final in straight sets. Alongside Reynolds, Watt made his Grand Slam debut in the men's doubles at the 2026 French Open.

== ATP Tour finals ==
=== Doubles: 1 (1 runner-up) ===
Legend Grand Slam (0–0) ATP 1000 (0–0) ATP 500 (0–0) ATP 250 (0–1)	Finals by surface Hard (0–1) Clay (0–0) Grass (0–0)

Result	W–L	Date	Tournament	Tier	Surface	Partner	Opponents	Score
Loss	0–1	Aug 2026	Los Cabos Open, Mexico	ATP 250	Hard	(New Zealand) Finn Reynolds	(United States) Ryan Seggerman (United States) Patrik Trhac	6–7^{(4–7)}, 7–6^{(7–5)}, [8–10]

== ATP Challenger and ITF Futures finals ==
=== Doubles: 20 (13 titles, 7 runners-up) ===
Legend ATP Challenger Tour (10–7) ITF Futures (3–0)	Finals by surface Hard (12–7) Clay (0–0) Grass (1–0) Carpet (0–0)

Result	W–L	Date	Tournament	Tier	Surface	Partner	Opponents	Score
Win	1–0	Sep 2024	M25 Cairns, Australia	World Tennis Tour	Hard	(Australia) Matt Hulme	(Australia) Joshua Charlton (Australia) Blake Ellis	6–3, 6–7^{(5–7)}, [10–7]
Loss	1–1	Feb 2025	Brisbane, Australia	Challenger	Hard	(Australia) Matt Hulme	(Australia) Joshua Charlton (Australia) Patrick Harper	6–4, 6–7^{(5–7)}, [10–12]
Win	2–1	Feb 2025	M25 Burnie, Australia	World Tennis Tour	Hard	(Australia) Matt Hulme	(Chinese Taipei) Hsu Yu-hsiou (Chinese Taipei) Huang Tsung-hao	6–2, 6–4
Win	3–1	Mar 2025	M25 Mildura, Australia	World Tennis Tour	Hard	(Australia) Matt Hulme	(Australia) Joshua Charlton (New Zealand) Ajeet Rai	6–7^{(7–9)}, 7–6^{(7–1)}, [13–11]
Loss	3–2	Mar 2025	Cuernavaca, Mexico	Challenger	Hard	(New Zealand) Finn Reynolds	(Antigua and Barbuda) Jody Maginley (United States) Alfredo Perez	5–7, 7–6^{(7–5)}, [8–10]
Loss	3–3	Apr 2025	Ostrava, Czech Republic	Challenger	Hard	(New Zealand) Finn Reynolds	(Czech Republic) Jan Jermář (Serbia) Stefan Latinović	5–7, 3–6
Win	4–3	Jun 2025	Tyler, United States	Challenger	Hard	(New Zealand) Finn Reynolds	(Spain) Àlex Martínez (Colombia) Adrià Soriano Barrera	6–3, 6–1
Win	5–3	Jun 2025	Cary, United States	Challenger	Hard	(New Zealand) Finn Reynolds	(Australia) Patrick Harper (United States) Trey Hilderbrand	6–3, 6–7^{(2–7)}, [10–5]
Win	6–3	Jun 2025	Granby, Canada	Challenger	Hard	(New Zealand) Finn Reynolds	(Australia) Kody Pearson (Japan) Yuta Shimizu	6–3, 6–4
Loss	6–4	Sep 2025	Las Vegas, United States	Challenger	Hard	(New Zealand) Finn Reynolds	(United States) Benjamin Kittay (United States) Joshua Sheehy	5–7, 6–7^{(2–7)}
Win	7–4	Sep 2025	Tiburon, United States	Challenger	Hard	(New Zealand) Finn Reynolds	(United States) Benjamin Kittay (United States) Joshua Sheehy	6–2, 6–3
Win	8–4	Oct 2025	Jinan, China	Challenger	Hard	(New Zealand) Finn Reynolds	(India) Rithvik Choudary Bollipalli (India) Arjun Kadhe	7–5, 7–6^{(7–1)}
Loss	8–5	Oct 2025	Shenzhen, China	Challenger	Hard	(New Zealand) Finn Reynolds	(United States) Nathaniel Lammons (Netherlands) Jean-Julien Rojer	7–6^{(7–5)}, 5–7, [4–10]
Loss	8–6	Nov 2025	Matsuyama, Japan	Challenger	Hard	(New Zealand) Finn Reynolds	(Switzerland) Marc-Andrea Hüsler (United States) Garrett Johns	3–6, 4–6
Loss	8–7	Jun 2026	Cary, United States	Challenger	Hard	(New Zealand) Finn Reynolds	(South Korea) Nam Ji-sung (Finland) Patrik Niklas-Salminen	7–5, 5–7, [8–10]
Win	9–7	Jul 2026	Newport, United States	Challenger	Grass	(New Zealand) Finn Reynolds	(Brazil) Fernando Romboli (Australia) John-Patrick Smith	6–1, 6–7^{(2–7)}, [10–6]
Win	10–7	Jul 2026	Granby, Canada	Challenger	Hard	(New Zealand) Finn Reynolds	(France) Guillaume Dalmasso (United States) Matt Kuhar	6–3, 6–4
Win	11–7	Oct 2026	Seoul, South Korea	Challenger	Hard	(New Zealand) Finn Reynolds	(Australia) Blake Bayldon (Australia) Thomas Fancutt	6–3, 3–6, [10–5]
Win	12–7	Nov 2026	Taipei, Taiwan	Challenger	Hard (i)	(New Zealand) Finn Reynolds	(India) Anirudh Chandrasekar (New Zealand) Ajeet Rai	6–3, 6–2
Win	13–7	Nov 2026	Matsuyama, Japan	Challenger	Hard	(New Zealand) Finn Reynolds	(Thailand) Pruchya Isaro (Japan) Yuta Shimizu	6–3, 6–3
