= Finn Reynolds =

New Zealand tennis player

- Country (sports): New Zealand
- Born: 4 January 2000 (age 26) Hastings, New Zealand
- Plays: Left-handed (two-handed backhand)
- College: Ole Miss
- Coach: Tracy (Nator) Collins
- Prize money: US $171,942

Singles
- Career record: 0–1 (at ATP Tour level, Grand Slam level, and in Davis Cup)
- Career titles: 0; 0 Challenger, 0 ITF Tour
- Highest ranking: No. 944 (26 June 2023)

Doubles
- Career record: 15–11 (at ATP Tour level, Grand Slam level, and in Davis Cup)
- Career titles: 0; 9 Challenger, 11 ITF Tour
- Highest ranking: No. 70 (16 November 2026)
- Current ranking: No. 70 (16 November 2026)

Grand Slam doubles results
- French Open: 1R (2026)
- US Open: 1R (2026)
- Last updated on: 16 November 2026.

Finn Reynolds (born 4 January 2000) is a professional tennis player from New Zealand who specializes in doubles. He has a career-high ATP singles ranking of world No. 944 achieved on 26 June 2023 and a doubles ranking of No. 70 achieved on 16 November 2026.

Reynolds first represented New Zealand at the Davis Cup in 2021, where he lost his debut match to World No. 83 Kwon Soon-woo.

== College ==
Reynolds played college tennis at Ole Miss.

== Junior Grand Slam finals ==
=== Doubles: 1 (runner-up) ===
Result	Year	Tournament	Surface	Partner	Opponents	Score
Loss	2017	Australian Open	Hard	(Portugal) Duarte Vale	(Chinese Taipei) Hsu Yu-hsiou (China) Zhao Lingxi	7–6^{(10–8)}, 4–6, [5–10]

== ATP Tour finals ==
=== Doubles: 1 (1 runner-up) ===
Legend Grand Slam (0–0) ATP 1000 (0–0) ATP 500 (0–0) ATP 250 (0–1)	Finals by surface Hard (0–1) Clay (0–0) Grass (0–0)

Result	W–L	Date	Tournament	Tier	Surface	Partner	Opponents	Score
Loss	0–1	Aug 2026	Los Cabos Open, Mexico	ATP 250	Hard	(New Zealand) James Watt	(United States) Ryan Seggerman (United States) Patrik Trhac	6–7^{(4–7)}, 7–6^{(7–5)}, [8–10]

== ATP Challenger and ITF World Tennis Tour finals ==
=== Doubles: 37 (23 titles, 14 runners-up) ===
Legend ATP Challenger Tour (12–7) ITF $25,000 (1–3) ITF $15,000 (10–4)	Finals by surface Hard (17–10) Clay (4–4) Grass (1–0) Carpet (1–0)

Result	W–L	Date	Level	Tournament	Surface	Partner	Opponents	Score
Win	1–0	Aug 2022	M15	Memphis, United States	Hard	(United Kingdom) Millen Hurrion	(United States) Alex Michelsen (United States) Cooper Williams	6–0, 6–1
Win	2–0	Oct 2022	M15	Sharm El Sheikh, Egypt	Hard	(United States) Andrew Rogers	(Chinese Taipei) Tsai Chang-lin (China) Zheng Baoluo	0–6, 6–2, [13–11]
Loss	2–1	Oct 2022	M15	Sharm El Sheikh, Egypt	Hard	(United States) Andrew Rogers	(Chinese Taipei) Tsai Chang-lin (China) Zheng Baoluo	walkover
Win	3–1	Oct 2022	M15	Sharm El Sheikh, Egypt	Hard	(United States) Alex Kuperstein	(Italy) Andrea Picchione (Italy) Nicolo Pozzani	6–0, 6–4
Win	4–1	Dec 2022	M15	Wellington, New Zealand	Hard	(Australia) Jake Delaney	(New Zealand) Isaac Becroft (Australia) Kody Pearson	6–2, 6–7^{(4–7)}, [10–8]
Win	5–1	Apr 2023	M15	Tacarigua, Trinidad and Tobago	Hard	(Australia) Edward Winter	(United States) Ezekiel Clark (Republic of Ireland) Osgar O'Hoisin	4–6, 7–6^{(7–4)}, [10–6]
Loss	5–2	Jun 2023	M25	Nakhon Si Thammarat, Thailand	Hard	(Thailand) Maximus Jones	(Philippines) Francis Casey Alcantara (Japan) Hiroki Moriya	2–6, 4–6
Win	6–2	Sep 2023	M15	Forbach, France	Carpet	(United Kingdom) Millen Hurrion	(Switzerland) Louroi Martinez (Morocco) Adam Moundir	6–4, 3–6, [10–7]
Loss	6–3	Oct 2023	M25	Telavi, Georgia	Clay	(Israel) Roy Stepanov	(France) Corentin Denolly (Switzerland) Damien Wenger	0–6, 2–6
Win	7–3	Nov 2023	M15	Valencia, Spain	Clay	(Ukraine) Volodymyr Uzhylovskyi	(Romania) Alexandru-Cristian Dumitru (Croatia) Kristian Tumbas Kajgo	6–3, 6–0
Loss	7–4	Nov 2023	M15	Alcala de Henares, Spain	Hard	(Costa Rica) Jesse Flores	(United Kingdom) George Houghton (United Kingdom) Hamish Stewart	4–6, 7–6^{(7–3)}, [12–14]
Loss	7–5	Dec 2023	M15	Valverde, Madrid, Spain	Hard	(United States) AJ Catanzariti	(Spain) Miguel Avendano Cadena (Spain) Luis Llorens Saracho	1–6, 3–6
Win	8–5	Dec 2023	M15	Wellington, New Zealand	Clay	(New Zealand) Marcus Daniell	(Australia) Joshua Charlton (United Kingdom) Emile Hudd	6–4, 6–2
Win	9–5	Dec 2023	M15	Papamoa, New Zealand	Hard	(New Zealand) Marcus Daniell	(New Zealand) Reece Falck (New Zealand) George Stoupe	7–5, 6–4
Loss	9–6	Feb 2024	M15	Palm Coast, United States	Clay	(Colombia) Juan Sebastián Gómez	(Ecuador) Andrés Andrade (United States) Alex Rybakov	1–6, 3–6
Win	10–6	Feb 2024	M25	Calabasas, United States	Hard	(Canada) Benjamin Sigouin	(United States) Kyle Kang (United States) Neel Rajesh	4–6, 6–2, [13–11]
Loss	10–7	Jun 2024	M25	Sarajevo, Bosnia and Herzegovina	Clay	(Australia) Adam Taylor	(Switzerland) Jakub Paul (Czech Republic) Matej Vocel	0–6, 4–6
Loss	10–8	Jun 2024	Challenger	Santa Cruz de la Sierra, Bolivia	Clay	(Chile) Matías Soto	(Lebanon) Hady Habib (United States) Trey Hilderbrand	6–3, 3–6, [7–10]
Win	11–8	Jun 2024	Challenger	Ibagué, Colombia	Clay	(Chile) Matías Soto	(Argentina) Leonardo Aboian (Argentina) Valerio Aboian	6–4, 4–6, [10–7]
Win	12–8	Aug 2024	Challenger	Bogotá, Colombia	Clay	(Chile) Matías Soto	(Brazil) João Lucas Reis da Silva (Zimbabwe) Benjamin Lock	6–3, 6–4
Win	13–8	Aug 2024	M15	Huntsville, United States	Clay	(United States) Jamie Vance	(United States) Collin Altamirano (Japan) Leo Vithoontien	6–4, 6–4
Loss	13–9	Mar 2025	Challenger	Cuernavaca, Mexico	Hard	(New Zealand) James Watt	(Antigua and Barbuda) Jody Maginley (United States) Alfredo Perez	5–7, 7–6^{(7–5)}, [8–10]
Loss	13–10	Apr 2025	Challenger	Ostrava, Czech Republic	Hard	(New Zealand) James Watt	(Czech Republic) Jan Jermář (Serbia) Stefan Latinović	5–7, 3–6
Win	14–10	Jun 2025	Challenger	Tyler, United States	Hard	(New Zealand) James Watt	(Spain) Àlex Martínez (Colombia) Adrià Soriano Barrera	6–3, 6–1
Win	15–10	Jun 2025	Challenger	Cary, United States	Hard	(New Zealand) James Watt	(Australia) Patrick Harper (United States) Trey Hilderbrand	6–3, 6–7^{(2–7)}, [10–5]
Win	16–10	Jun 2025	Challenger	Granby, Canada	Hard	(New Zealand) James Watt	(Australia) Kody Pearson (Japan) Yuta Shimizu	6–3, 6–4
Loss	16–11	Sep 2025	Challenger	Las Vegas, United States	Hard	(New Zealand) James Watt	(United States) Benjamin Kittay (United States) Joshua Sheehy	5–7, 6–7^{(2–7)}
Win	17–11	Sep 2025	Challenger	Tiburon, United States	Hard	(New Zealand) James Watt	(United States) Benjamin Kittay (United States) Joshua Sheehy	6–2, 6–3
Win	18–11	Oct 2025	Challenger	Jinan, China	Hard	(New Zealand) James Watt	(India) Rithvik Choudary Bollipalli (India) Arjun Kadhe	7–5, 7–6^{(7–1)}
Loss	18–12	Oct 2025	Challenger	Shenzhen, China	Hard	(New Zealand) James Watt	(United States) Nathaniel Lammons (Netherlands) Jean-Julien Rojer	7–6^{(7–5)}, 5–7, [4–10]
Loss	18–13	Nov 2025	Challenger	Matsuyama, Japan	Hard	(New Zealand) James Watt	(Switzerland) Marc-Andrea Hüsler (United States) Garrett Johns	3–6, 4–6
Loss	18–14	Jun 2026	Challenger	Cary, United States	Hard	(New Zealand) James Watt	(South Korea) Nam Ji-sung (Finland) Patrik Niklas-Salminen	7–5, 5–7, [8–10]
Win	19–14	Jul 2026	Challenger	Newport, United States	Grass	(New Zealand) James Watt	(Brazil) Fernando Romboli (Australia) John-Patrick Smith	6–1, 6–7^{(2–7)}, [10–6]
Win	20–14	Jul 2026	Challenger	Granby, Canada	Hard	(New Zealand) James Watt	(France) Guillaume Dalmasso (United States) Matt Kuhar	6–3, 6–4
Win	21–14	Oct 2026	Challenger	Seoul, South Korea	Hard	(New Zealand) James Watt	(Australia) Blake Bayldon (Australia) Thomas Fancutt	6–3, 3–6, [10–5]
Win	22–14	Nov 2026	Challenger	Taipei, Taiwan	Hard (i)	(New Zealand) James Watt	(India) Anirudh Chandrasekar (New Zealand) Ajeet Rai	6–3, 6–2
Win	23–14	Nov 2026	Challenger	Matsuyama, Japan	Hard	(New Zealand) James Watt	(Thailand) Pruchya Isaro (Japan) Yuta Shimizu	6–3, 6–3

== Davis Cup (1) ==
Legend Group membership World Group (0) Group I (0–1) Group II (0) Group III (0) Group IV (0)	Results by surface Hard (0–0) Grass (0–1) Clay (0–0) Carpet (0–0)	Results by setting Outdoors (0–1) Indoors (0–0)

- ▲ ▼ indicates the outcome of the Davis Cup match followed by the score, date, place of event, the zonal classification and its phase, and the court surface.

Rubber outcome	No.	Rubber	Match type (partner if any)	Opponent nation	Opponent player(s)	Score
▼1–3; 18–19 September 2021; International Tennis Hall of Fame, Newport, Rhode Island, USA; World Group I; Grass surface
Defeat	1.	II	Singles	South Korea	Kwon Soon-woo	6–7^{(1–7)}, 3–6
