= Matsuyama Challenger =

Ehime International Open

ATP Challenger Tour
- Event name: Unicharm Trophy Ehime International Open Tennis
- Location: Matsuyama, Japan
- Venue: Ehime Prefectural Sports Complex
- Category: ATP Challenger Tour
- Surface: Hard
- Draw: 32S / 16D
- Prize money: $100,000 (2025)
- Website: website

The Ehime International Open Tennis is a professional tennis tournament played on hardcourts. It is part of the ATP Challenger Tour. It is held in Matsuyama, Ehime prefecture, Japan.

== Past finals ==
=== Singles ===
Year	Champion	Runner-up	Score
2026	(United Kingdom) Billy Harris	(Chinese Taipei) Hsu Yu-hsiou	3–6, 6–1, 7–6^{(8–6)}
2025	(Portugal) Henrique Rocha	(Japan) Sho Shimabukuro	7–5, 3–6, 6–2
2024	(United States) Nicolas Moreno de Alboran	(Australia) Alex Bolt	7–6^{(7–4)}, 6–2
2023	(Italy) Luca Nardi	(Japan) Taro Daniel	3–6, 6–4, 6–2
2022	(South Korea) Hong Seong-chan	(Chinese Taipei) Wu Tung-lin	6–3, 6–2

=== Doubles ===
Year	Champions	Runners-up	Score
2026	(New Zealand) Finn Reynolds (New Zealand) James Watt	(Thailand) Pruchya Isaro (Japan) Yuta Shimizu	6–3, 6–3
2025	(Switzerland) Marc-Andrea Hüsler (United States) Garrett Johns	(New Zealand) Finn Reynolds (New Zealand) James Watt	6–3, 6–4
2024	(Japan) Seita Watanabe (Japan) Takeru Yuzuki	(United States) Nicolas Moreno de Alboran (New Zealand) Rubin Statham	6–4, 6–3
2023	(Poland) Karol Drzewiecki (Czech Republic) Zdeněk Kolář	(Japan) Toshihide Matsui (Japan) Kaito Uesugi	6–3, 6–2
2022	(Australia) Andrew Harris (Australia) John-Patrick Smith	(Japan) Toshihide Matsui (Japan) Kaito Uesugi	6–3, 4–6, [10–8]
