= Sho Shimabukuro =

Japanese tennis player (born 1997)

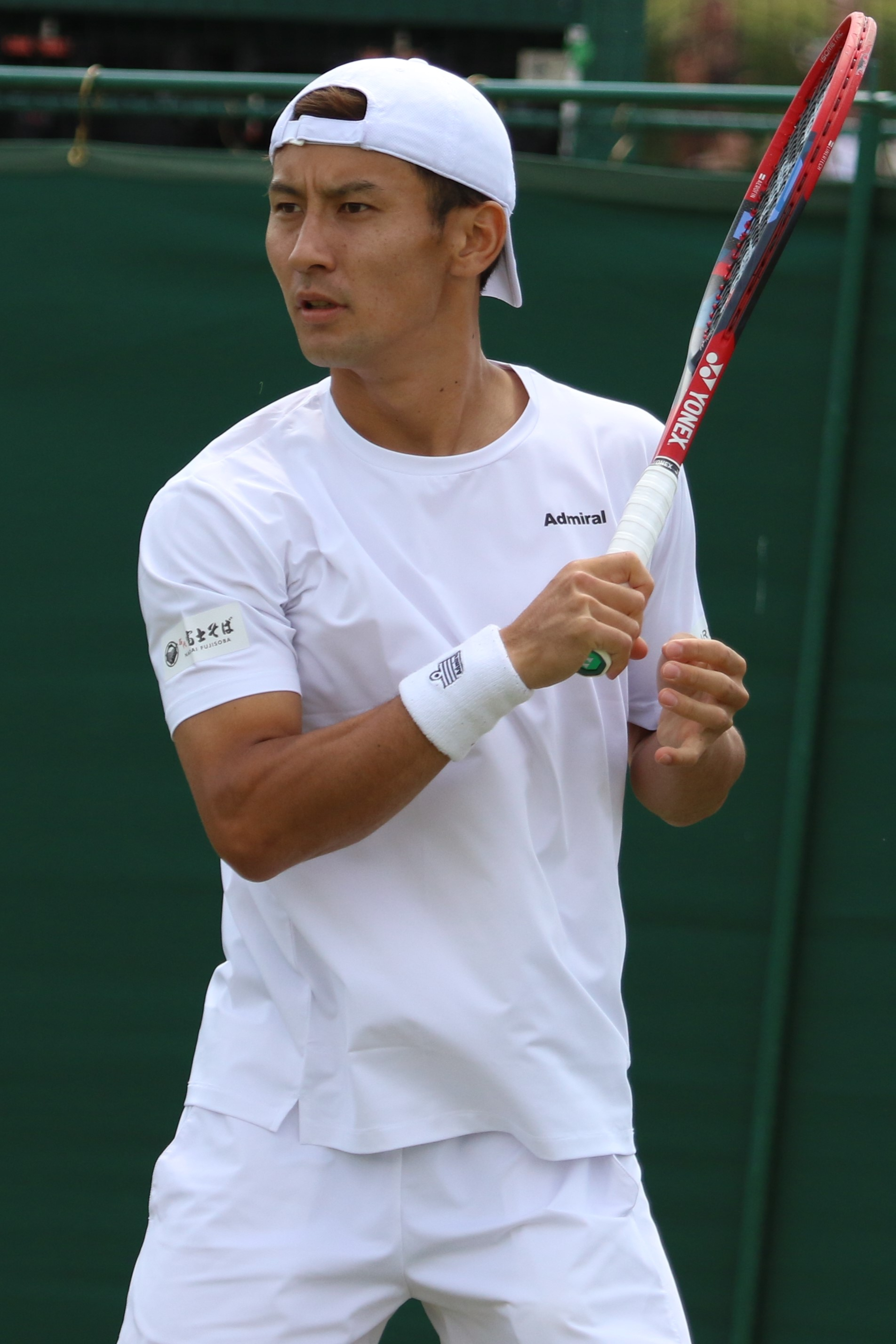
- Shimabukuro at the 2023 Wimbledon Championships
- Country (sports): Japan
- Born: 30 July 1997 (age 29) Gifu, Japan
- Height: 1.80 m (5 ft 11 in)
- Turned pro: 2020
- Plays: Right-handed (two-handed backhand)
- Coach: Thomas Shimada, Satoshi Iwabuchi
- Prize money: US $1,192,574

Singles
- Career record: 9–19
- Career titles: 0
- Highest ranking: No. 87 (24 August 2026)
- Current ranking: No. 108 (28 September 2026)

Grand Slam singles results
- Australian Open: Q2 (2025)
- French Open: Q1 (2024, 2026)
- Wimbledon: 1R (2023, 2026)
- US Open: 1R (2023, 2026)

Doubles
- Career record: 2–1
- Career titles: 0
- Highest ranking: No. 376 (16 September 2024)
- Current ranking: No. 1,218 (31 August 2026)
- Last updated on: 30 September 2026.

Sho Shimabukuro (島袋 将, Shimabukuro Shō, born 30 July 1997) is a Japanese professional tennis player. Shimabukuro has a career high ATP singles ranking of world No. 87 achieved on 24 August 2026 and a doubles ranking of No. 376 achieved on 16 September 2024. He is currently the No. 1 Japanese player.

Shimabukuro represents Japan at the Davis Cup, where he has a W/L record of 1–0.

== Career ==
=== 2023-25: Challenger titles, Major & top 150 debuts ===
Following his first two career Challengers titles, one in January in Nonthaburi, defeating Arthur Cazaux and in May 2023 in Tunis, Shimabukuro reached the top 200 at world No. 178 on 22 May 2023.

In June 2023, Shimabukuro defeated Liam Broady in straight sets to reach the quarterfinals of the 2023 Nottingham Open. As a result, he reached a new career ranking of No. 172 on 19 June 2023. In the next grass court Challenger event, the 2023 Ilkley Trophy, he reached also the quarterfinals as a lucky loser but retired this time against Arthur Cazaux. He climbed another 10 positions to world No. 162, one week later, on 26 June 2023. Shimabukuro made his Grand Slam debut after qualifying for the main draw of the 2023 Wimbledon Championships where he lost to 21st seed Grigor Dimitrov.

In August 2023, Shimabukuro entered the ATP 500 tournament in Washington as a lucky loser and won his first career ATP tour level match defeating Lloyd Harris but lost to Christopher Eubanks. Shimabukuro also qualified for the main draw on his debut at the 2023 US Open. He qualified for the 2023 Astana Open and defeated Roberto Carballés Baena, his second career ATP tour win.

Shimabukuro received a wildcard for the main draw of the ATP 500 2023 Japan Open, and for the qualifying draw at the same tournament in 2025 where he qualified and upset fifth seed Tomáš Macháč for the biggest win of his career and only his fifth ATP win.

=== 2026: Masters & top 100 debuts, Japanese No. 1 ===
At the 2026 Abierto Mexicano Telcel Shimabukoro qualified for the main draw and defeated Adrian Mannarino. Ranked at a career-high of No. 113, as the No. 1 Japanese player, Shimabukoro qualified for his first Masters main draw at the 2026 BNP Paribas Open.

Ranked No. 104, Shimabukoro also qualified for the main draw at the 2026 BOSS Open and defeated Quentin Halys and Nick Kyrgios to reach his first ATP quarterfinal and also record his first two grass court wins. As a result he reached the top 100 in the singles rankings on 15 June 2026. A week later he moved to a new career-high singles ranking of No. 89.

== Performance timeline ==
Key
W	F	SF	QF	#R	RR	Q#	DNQ	A	NH

(W) winner; (F) finalist; (SF) semifinalist; (QF) quarterfinalist; (#R) rounds 4, 3, 2, 1; (RR) round-robin stage; (Q#) qualification round; (DNQ) did not qualify; (A) absent; (NH) not held; (SR) strike rate (events won / competed); (W–L) win–loss record.
To avoid confusion and double counting, these charts are updated at the conclusion of a tournament or when the player's participation has ended.

=== Singles ===
Current through the 2026 Rolex Shanghai Masters.

Tournament	2023	2024	2025	2026	SR	W–L	Win%
Grand Slam tournaments
Australian Open	A	Q1	Q2	Q1	0 / 0	0–0	–
French Open	A	Q1	A	Q1	0 / 0	0–0	–
Wimbledon	1R	Q3	Q2	1R	0 / 2	0–2	0%
US Open	1R	Q1	Q1	1R	0 / 2	0–2	0%
Win–loss	0–2	0–0	0–0	0–2	0 / 4	0–4	0%
ATP 1000 tournaments
Indian Wells Open	A	A	A	1R	0 / 1	0–1	0%
Miami Open	A	A	A	Q2	0 / 0	0–0	–
Monte-Carlo Masters	A	A	A	A	0 / 0	0–0	–
Madrid Open	A	A	A	A	0 / 0	0-0	–
Italian Open	A	A	A	A	0 / 0	0–0	–
Canadian Open	A	A	A	1R	0 / 1	0–1	0%
Cincinnati Open	A	A	A	1R	0 / 1	0–1	0%
Shanghai Masters	Q1	Q2	A	1R	0 / 1	0–1	0%
Paris Masters	A	A	A		0 / 0	0–0	–
Win–loss	0–0	0–0	0–0	0–4	0 / 4	0–4	0%

== ATP Challenger Tour finals ==
=== Singles: 9 (5 titles, 4 runner-ups) ===
Finals by surface
Hard (4–4)
Clay (1–0)

Result	W–L	Date	Tournament	Surface	Opponent	Score
Win	1–0	Jan 2023	Nonthaburi Challenger III, Thailand	Hard	(France) Arthur Cazaux	6–2, 7–5
Win	2–0	May 2023	Tunis Open, Tunisia	Clay	(France) Geoffrey Blancaneaux	6–4, 6–4
Loss	2–1	Nov 2023	Kobe Challenger, Japan	Hard	(Croatia) Duje Ajduković	4–6, 2–6
Loss	2–2	Jul 2024	Winnipeg Challenger, Canada	Hard	(France) Benjamin Bonzi	7–5, 1–6, 4–6
Win	3–2	Sep 2024	Shanghai Challenger, China	Hard	(Chinese Taipei) Hsu Yu-hsiou	6–4, 6–4
Loss	3–3	Sep 2024	Guangzhou Tennis Open, China	Hard	(Australia) Christopher O'Connell	6–1, 5–7, 6–7 ^{(5–7)}
Win	4–3	Aug 2025	Zhangjiagang Challenger, China	Hard	(United Kingdom) Oliver Crawford	6–3, 3–6, 7–5
Win	5–3	Nov 2025	Seoul Challenger, South Korea	Hard	(Hong Kong) Coleman Wong	6–4, 6–3
Loss	5–4	Nov 2025	Matsuyama Challenger, Japan	Hard	(Portugal) Henrique Rocha	5–7, 6–3, 2–6

== ITF Futures/World Tennis Tour finals ==
=== Singles: 6 (3 titles, 3 runner-ups) ===
Finals by surface
Hard (3–3)
Clay (–)

Result	W–L	Date	Tournament	Surface	Opponent	Score
Loss	0–1	Mar 2019	M15 Kofu, Japan	Hard	(Japan) Jumpei Yamasaki	6–7^{(5–7)}, 3–6
Loss	0–2	May 2019	M15 Wuhan, China	Hard	(Japan) Shuichi Sekiguchi	3–6, 0–6
Win	1–2	Aug 2019	M15 Jakarta, Indonesia	Hard	(South Africa) Ruan Roelofse	7–6^{(7–3)}, 6–2
Win	2–2	Jan 2022	M25 Monastir, Tunisia	Hard	(France) Clément Tabur	6–1, 4–6, 6–1
Win	3–2	Jun 2022	M25 Harmon Air Force Base, Guam (USA)	Hard	(South Korea) Hong Seong-chan	3–6, 6–4, 6–1
Loss	3–3	Apr 2023	M25 Tsukuba, Japan	Hard	(Chinese Taipei) Hsu Yu-hsiou	6–7^{(5–7)}, 4–6

=== Doubles: 7 (3 titles, 4 runner-ups) ===
Finals by surface
Hard (3–4)
Clay (–)

Result	W–L	Date	Tournament	Surface	Partner	Opponents	Score
Loss	0–1	Feb 2017	Indonesia F3, Jakarta	Hard	(Japan) Sho Katayama	(Indonesia) Justin Barki (Indonesia) Christopher Rungkat	3–6, 2–6
Win	1–1	Jul 2018	Indonesia F2, Jakarta	Hard	(Japan) Kaito Uesugi	(South Korea) Cheong-Eui Kim (Indonesia) David Agung Susanto	6–3, 7–6^{(7–4)}
Loss	1–2	May 2019	M15 Wuhan, China	Hard	(Japan) Shuichi Sekiguchi	(Japan) Sora Fukuda (Japan) Yuki Mochizuki	7–6^{(7–5)}, 4–6, [8–10]
Loss	1–3	Aug 2019	M15 Jakarta, Indonesia	Hard	(Japan) Hiroyasu Ehara	(Indonesia) Justin Barki (South Africa) Ruan Roelofse	6–7^{(3–7)}, 4–6
Win	2–3	Aug 2019	M15 Jakarta, Indonesia	Hard	(Japan) Hiroyasu Ehara	(United Kingdom) Jonathan Gray (Japan) Jumpei Yamasaki	6–1, 6–2
Loss	2–4	Oct 2021	M15 Cancún, Mexico	Hard	(Japan) Naoki Tajima	(India) Siddhant Banthia (Japan) Seita Watanabe	6–1, 4–6, [3–10]
Win	3–4	Oct 2021	M15 Cancún, Mexico	Hard	(Japan) Naoki Tajima	(United States) Mwendwa Mbithi (Dominican Republic) Peter Bertran	7–6^{(7–5)}, 6–4
