= Garrett Johns =

American tennis player (born 2000)

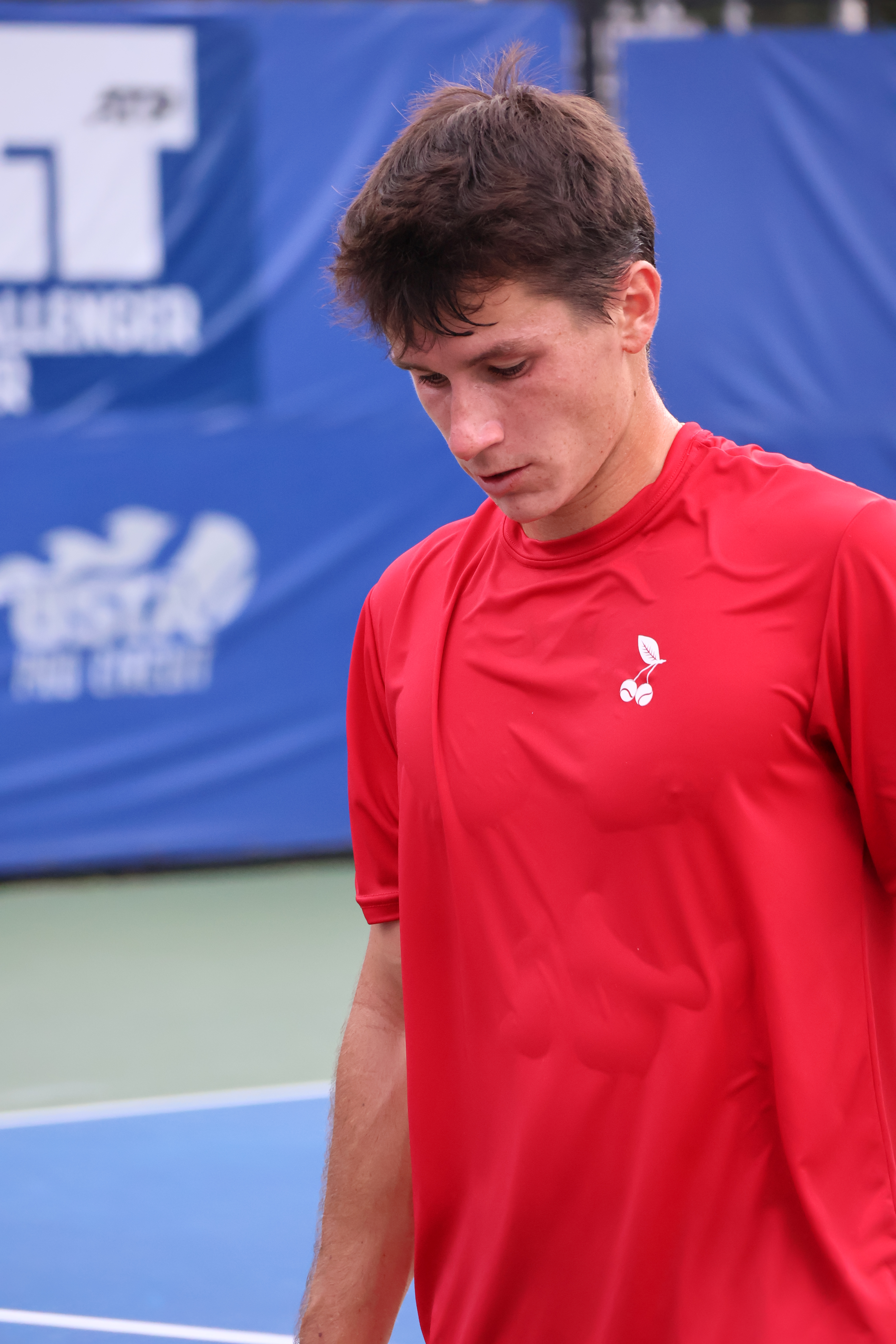
- Johns in 2023
- Country (sports): United States
- Born: December 17, 2000 (age 25) Atlanta, United States
- Height: 5 ft 11 in (1.80 m)
- Plays: Right-handed (two-handed backhand)
- College: Duke
- Coach: Noel Wadawu
- Prize money: US $200,179

Singles
- Career record: 0–0 (at ATP Tour level, Grand Slam level, and in Davis Cup)
- Career titles: 8 ITF
- Highest ranking: No. 279 (November 17, 2025)
- Current ranking: No. 458 (October 19, 2026)

Doubles
- Career record: 0–0 (at ATP Tour level, Grand Slam level, and in Davis Cup)
- Career titles: 1 ATP Challenger, 6 ITF
- Highest ranking: No. 263 (May 18, 2026)
- Current ranking: No. 272 (October 19, 2026)
- Last updated on: October 19, 2026.

Garrett Johns (born December 17, 2000) is an American tennis player. Johns has a career high ATP singles ranking of No. 279 achieved on November 17, 2025 and a career high ATP doubles ranking of No. 263 achieved on May 18, 2026.

Johns has won one ATP Challenger doubles title at the 2025 Matsuyama Challenger.

Johns played college tennis at Duke.
