= Yusuke Kusuhara =

Japanese tennis player (born 1997)

Yusuke Kusuhara 楠原悠介
- Country (sports): Japan
- Born: 9 August 1997 (age 29) Japan
- Height: 1.73 m (5 ft 8 in)
- Plays: Right-handed (two-handed backhand)
- Prize money: US $43,953

Singles
- Career record: 0–0 (at ATP Tour level, Grand Slam level, and in Davis Cup)
- Career titles: 1 ITF
- Highest ranking: No. 638 (24 November 2025)
- Current ranking: No. 921 (9 November 2026)

Doubles
- Career record: 0–0 (at ATP Tour level, Grand Slam level, and in Davis Cup)
- Career titles: 1 Challenger, 15 ITF
- Highest ranking: No. 239 (12 January 2026)
- Current ranking: No. 274 (9 November 2026)
Medal record
Men's tennis
Representing Japan
Asian Games
Gold medal – first place	2026 Aichi–Nagoya	Doubles
Silver medal – second place	2026 Aichi–Nagoya	Mixed doubles
- Last updated on: 9 November 2026.

Yusuke Kusuhara (楠原 悠介, Kusuhara Yusuke) (born 9 August 1997) is a Japanese tennis player. Kusuhara has a career high ATP singles ranking of No. 638 achieved on 24 November 2025 and a career high ATP doubles ranking of No. 239 achieved on 12 January 2026.

Kusuhara has won one ATP Challenger doubles title at the 2026 BNC Tennis Open.
