= Shunsuke Nakagawa =

Japanese tennis player (born 2000)

Shunsuke Nakagawa 中川舜祐
- Country (sports): Japan
- Born: 7 March 2000 (age 26) Shiga Prefecture, Japan
- Height: 1.73 m (5 ft 8 in)
- Plays: Right-handed (two-handed backhand)
- Prize money: US $36,112

Singles
- Career record: 0–0 (at ATP Tour level, Grand Slam level, and in Davis Cup)
- Career titles: 0
- Highest ranking: No. 845 (24 November 2025)
- Current ranking: No. 970 (14 September 2026)

Doubles
- Career record: 0–0 (at ATP Tour level, Grand Slam level, and in Davis Cup)
- Career titles: 1 Challenger, 15 ITF
- Highest ranking: No. 234 (16 February 2026)
- Current ranking: No. 303 (14 September 2026)
Medal record
Men's tennis
Representing Japan
Asian Games
Gold medal – first place	2026 Aichi–Nagoya	Doubles
- Last updated on: 2 October 2026.

Shunsuke Nakagawa (中川 舜祐, Nakagawa Shunsuke) (born 7 March 2000) is a Japanese tennis player. Nakagawa has a career high ATP singles ranking of No. 845 achieved on 24 November 2025 and a career high ATP doubles ranking of No. 234 achieved on 16 February 2026.

Nakagawa has won one ATP Challenger doubles title at the 2026 BNC Tennis Open.
