= 2023 Kobe Challenger – Doubles =

Doubles
- 2023 Kobe Challenger

Final
- Champions: (United States) Evan King (United States) Reese Stalder
- Runners-up: (Australia) Andrew Harris (South Korea) Nam Ji-sung
- Score: 7–6^{(7–3)}, 2–6, [10–7]

Events
Singles	Doubles
← 2022 ·	Kobe Challenger	· 2024 →

Shinji Hazawa and Yuta Shimizu were the defending champions but lost in the first round to Purav Raja and Ramkumar Ramanathan.

Evan King and Reese Stalder won the title after defeating Andrew Harris and Nam Ji-sung 7–6^{(7–3)}, 2–6, [10–7] in the final.

== Seeds ==
1. (United States) Evan King / (United States) Reese Stalder (champions)
2. (Australia) Andrew Harris / (South Korea) Nam Ji-sung (final)
3. (India) Rithvik Choudary Bollipalli / (India) Arjun Kadhe (first round)
4. (Serbia) Ivan Sabanov / (Serbia) Matej Sabanov (semifinals)

== Draw ==
=== Key ===
- Q = Qualifier
- WC = Wild card
- LL = Lucky loser
- Alt = Alternate
- SE = Special exempt
- PR = Protected ranking
- ITF = ITF entry
- JE = Junior exempt
- w/o = Walkover
- r = Retired
- d = Defaulted
- SR = Special ranking

First round
1	(United States) E King (United States) R Stalder	1	6	[10]
(Sweden) F Bergevi (Netherlands) M Veldheer	6	3	[4]
(Poland) K Drzewiecki (Czech Republic) Z Kolář	4	2
(India) N Kaliyanda Poonacha (India) D Sharan	6	6
4	(Serbia) I Sabanov (Serbia) M Sabanov	4	6	[10]
Alt	(Japan) S Shimabukuro (Japan) S Watanabe	6	4	[6]
(Australia) B Ellis (Australia) C Puttergill	6	2	[10]
(Japan) T Matsui (Japan) K Uesugi	4	6	[8]
WC	(Japan) S Hazawa (Japan) Y Shimizu	7^{8}	4	[5]
(India) P Raja (India) R Ramanathan	6^{6}	6	[10]
(South Korea) Y-s Chung (Philippines) R Gonzales	6	6
3	(India) RC Bollipalli (India) A Kadhe	4	4
Alt	(Chinese Taipei) J Jung (Chinese Taipei) T-l Wu	6	6
WC	(Japan) T Ichikawa (Japan) Ryuki Matsuda	2	0
(Chinese Taipei) R Ho (Australia) MC Romios	6	1	[3]
2	(Australia) A Harris (South Korea) J-s Nam	1	6	[10]

Quarterfinals
1	(United States) E King (United States) R Stalder	2	6	[11]
(India) N Kaliyanda Poonacha (India) D Sharan	6	3	[9]
4	(Serbia) I Sabanov (Serbia) M Sabanov	6	6
(Australia) B Ellis (Australia) C Puttergill	4	3
(India) P Raja (India) R Ramanathan	6^{4}	6	[9]
(South Korea) Y-s Chung (Philippines) R Gonzales	7^{7}	3	[11]
Alt	(Chinese Taipei) J Jung (Chinese Taipei) T-l Wu	4	5
2	(Australia) A Harris (South Korea) J-s Nam	6	7

Semifinals
1	(United States) E King (United States) R Stalder	6	6
4	(Serbia) I Sabanov (Serbia) M Sabanov	2	1
(South Korea) Y-s Chung (Philippines) R Gonzales	6^{5}	6^{3}
2	(Australia) A Harris (South Korea) J-s Nam	7^{7}	7^{7}

Final
1	(United States) E King (United States) R Stalder	7^{7}	2	[10]
2	(Australia) A Harris (South Korea) J-s Nam	6^{3}	6	[7]
