= 2019 Kobe Challenger – Doubles =

Tennis tournament

Doubles
- 2019 Kobe Challenger

Final
- Champions: (India) Purav Raja (India) Ramkumar Ramanathan
- Runners-up: (Sweden) André Göransson (Indonesia) Christopher Rungkat
- Score: 7–6^{(8–6)}, 6–3

Events
Singles	Doubles
- Kobe Challenger

Gonçalo Oliveira and Akira Santillan were the defending champions but chose to defend their title with different partners. Oliveira partnered Brydan Klein but withdrew in the first round. Santillan partnered Bradley Mousley but lost in the first round to Nam Ji-sung and Song Min-kyu.

Purav Raja and Ramkumar Ramanathan won the title after defeating André Göransson and Christopher Rungkat 7–6^{(8–6)}, 6–3 in the final.

== Seeds ==
1. (Australia) Matt Reid / (Australia) Luke Saville (quarterfinals)
2. (Sweden) André Göransson / (Indonesia) Christopher Rungkat (final)
3. (Chinese Taipei) Hsieh Cheng-peng / (Chinese Taipei) Yang Tsung-hua (quarterfinals)
4. (India) Purav Raja / (India) Ramkumar Ramanathan (champions)

== Draw ==
Key

- Q = Qualifier
- WC = Wild card
- LL = Lucky loser
- Alt = Alternate
- ITF = ITF entry
- PR = Protected ranking
- SR = Special ranking
- SE = Special exempt
- JE = Junior exempt
- JR = Junior Accelerator Programme entrant
- CO = College Accelerator Programme entrant
- NG = Next Gen Accelerator Program entrant
- w/o = Walkover
- r = Retired
- d = Defaulted

First round
WC	(Japan) T Ichikawa (Japan) S Watanabe	6	5	[4]
(Japan) T Matsui (Japan) Yo Watanuki	3	7	[10]
4	(India) P Raja (India) R Ramanathan	4
(Thailand) Sa Ratiwatana (Thailand) So Ratiwatana	2^{r}
(South Korea) J-s Nam (South Korea) M-k Song	6	3	[10]
(Australia) B Mousley (Australia) A Santillan	4	6	[7]
(China) Y Bai (China) Z Li	7^{7}	6
WC	(Japan) Shintaro Imai (Japan) T Niki	6^{1}	4
WC	(Japan) S Hazawa (Japan) Y Shimizu
3	(Chinese Taipei) C-p Hsieh (Chinese Taipei) T-h Yang	w/o
(United Kingdom) B Klein (Portugal) G Oliveira
(India) A Kadhe (Spain) E López Pérez	w/o
(Chinese Taipei) C-h Tseng (Chinese Taipei) T-l Wu	4	3
2	(Sweden) A Göransson (Indonesia) C Rungkat	6	6

Quarterfinals
1	(Australia) M Reid (Australia) L Saville	0	6	[9]
(Japan) T Matsui (Japan) Yo Watanuki	6	4	[11]
4	(India) P Raja (India) R Ramanathan	7	2	[10]
(South Korea) J-s Nam (South Korea) M-k Song	5	6	[7]
(China) Y Bai (China) Z Li	7	6
3	(Chinese Taipei) C-p Hsieh (Chinese Taipei) T-h Yang	5	3
(India) A Kadhe (Spain) E López Pérez	4	2
2	(Sweden) A Göransson (Indonesia) C Rungkat	6	6

Semifinals
(Japan) T Matsui (Japan) Yo Watanuki	3	4
4	(India) P Raja (India) R Ramanathan	6	6
(China) Y Bai (China) Z Li	2	0
2	(Sweden) A Göransson (Indonesia) C Rungkat	6	6

Final
4	(India) P Raja (India) R Ramanathan	7^{8}	6
2	(Sweden) A Göransson (Indonesia) C Rungkat	6^{6}	3
