= 2024 Kobe Challenger – Doubles =

Doubles
- 2024 Kobe Challenger

Final
- Champions: (United States) Vasil Kirkov (Netherlands) Bart Stevens
- Runners-up: (Japan) Kaichi Uchida (Japan) Takeru Yuzuki
- Score: 7–6^{(9–7)}, 7–5

Events
Singles	Doubles
← 2023 ·	Kobe Challenger	· 2025 →

Evan King and Reese Stalder were the defending champions but chose not to defend their title.

Vasil Kirkov and Bart Stevens won the title after defeating Kaichi Uchida and Takeru Yuzuki 7–6^{(9–7)}, 7–5 in the final.

== Seeds ==
1. (United Kingdom) David Stevenson / (United Kingdom) Marcus Willis (quarterfinals)
2. (South Korea) Nam Ji-sung / (Australia) Matthew Romios (quarterfinals)
3. (India) Anirudh Chandrasekar / (India) Niki Kaliyanda Poonacha (quarterfinals)
4. (United States) Vasil Kirkov / (Netherlands) Bart Stevens (champions)

== Draw ==
=== Key ===
- Q = Qualifier
- WC = Wild card
- LL = Lucky loser
- Alt = Alternate
- SE = Special exempt
- PR = Protected ranking
- ITF = ITF entry
- JE = Junior exempt
- w/o = Walkover
- r = Retired
- d = Defaulted
- SR = Special ranking

=== Draw ===
First round
1	(United Kingdom) D Stevenson (United Kingdom) M Willis	6	6
(Japan) T Matsui (Japan) K Uesugi	4	4
(Japan) Y Uchiyama (Japan) S Watanabe	7^{7}	6^{5}	[6]
(Peru) A Merino (Germany) C Negritu	6^{4}	7^{7}	[10]
4	(United States) V Kirkov (Netherlands) B Stevens	6	3	[12]
(Australia) B Bayldon (Australia) C Puttergill	2	6	[10]
(Australia) T Fancutt (Switzerland) J Paul	6	3	[13]
WC	(Japan) T Ichikawa (Japan) Ryuki Matsuda	3	6	[11]
(Chinese Taipei) R Ho (India) S Myneni	6^{4}	5
WC	(Japan) S Hazawa (Japan) M Imamura	7^{7}	7
(Thailand) P Isaro (United Kingdom) J Paris	3	7^{10}	[9]
3	(India) A Chandrasekar (India) N Kaliyanda Poonacha	6	6^{8}	[11]
(United States) N Moreno de Alboran (New Zealand) R Statham	4	5
(Japan) K Uchida (Japan) T Yuzuki	6	7
(Japan) Y Shimizu (Australia) L Tu	3	2
2	(South Korea) J-s Nam (Australia) MC Romios	6	6

Quarterfinals
1	(United Kingdom) D Stevenson (United Kingdom) M Willis	4	4
(Peru) A Merino (Germany) C Negritu	6	6
4	(United States) V Kirkov (Netherlands) B Stevens	6	1	[10]
(Australia) T Fancutt (Switzerland) J Paul	2	6	[7]
WC	(Japan) S Hazawa (Japan) M Imamura	6	3	[10]
3	(India) A Chandrasekar (India) N Kaliyanda Poonacha	1	6	[5]
(Japan) K Uchida (Japan) T Yuzuki	7^{7}	4	[12]
2	(South Korea) J-s Nam (Australia) MC Romios	6^{5}	6	[10]

Semifinals
(Peru) A Merino (Germany) C Negritu	4	2
4	(United States) V Kirkov (Netherlands) B Stevens	6	6
WC	(Japan) S Hazawa (Japan) M Imamura	6	3	[5]
(Japan) K Uchida (Japan) T Yuzuki	1	6	[10]

Final
4	(United States) V Kirkov (Netherlands) B Stevens	7^{9}	7
(Japan) K Uchida (Japan) T Yuzuki	6^{7}	5
