= 2023 Kobe Challenger – Singles =

Singles
- 2023 Kobe Challenger

Final
- Champion: (Croatia) Duje Ajduković
- Runner-up: (Japan) Sho Shimabukuro
- Score: 6–4, 6–2

Events
Singles	Doubles
← 2022 ·	Kobe Challenger	· 2024 →

Yosuke Watanuki was the defending champion but chose not to defend his title.

Duje Ajduković won the title after defeating Sho Shimabukuro 6–4, 6–2 in the final.

== Seeds ==
1. (Austria) Jurij Rodionov (quarterfinals)
2. (Japan) Shintaro Mochizuki (quarterfinals)
3. (Italy) Luca Nardi (semifinals)
4. (Germany) Benjamin Hassan (second round)
5. (Japan) Sho Shimabukuro (final)
6. (Australia) Marc Polmans (quarterfinals)
7. (China) Bu Yunchaokete (withdrew)
8. (Czech Republic) Zdeněk Kolář (first round)

== Draw ==
=== Key ===
- Q = Qualifier
- WC = Wild card
- LL = Lucky loser
- Alt = Alternate
- ITF = ITF entry
- PR = Protected ranking
- SR = Special ranking
- SE = Special exempt
- JE = Junior exempt
- JR = Junior Accelerator Programme entrant
- CO = College Accelerator Programme entrant
- NG = Next Gen Accelerator Program entrant
- w/o = Walkover
- r = Retired
- d = Defaulted

=== Finals ===
Semifinals
(Croatia) Duje Ajduković	7	5	6
(Chinese Taipei) Wu Tung-lin	5	7	3
3	(Italy) Luca Nardi	2	2
5	(Japan) Sho Shimabukuro	6	6

Final
(Croatia) Duje Ajduković	6	6
5	(Japan) Sho Shimabukuro	4	2

=== Top half ===
First round
1	(Austria) J Rodionov	7^{7}	6
Q	(Japan) Y Uchiyama	6^{5}	4
WC	(Japan) T Ito	6^{6}	3
(Japan) Y Shimizu	7^{8}	6
(Croatia) D Ajduković	6	6
(Cyprus) M Efstathiou	2	2
(Chinese Taipei) Y-h Hsu	4	3
LL	(Japan) R Noguchi	6	6
4	(Germany) B Hassan	0	6	6
(Australia) J McCabe	6	3	2
(Australia) D Sweeny	3	6^{2}
(Chinese Taipei) T-l Wu	6	7^{7}
WC	(Japan) Renta Tokuda	6	1	2
Q	(South Korea) Y-s Chung	4	6	6
(Chinese Taipei) J Jung	6	7^{7}
8	(Czech Republic) Z Kolář	4	6^{4}

Second round
1	(Austria) J Rodionov	6	2	6
(Japan) Y Shimizu	1	6	1
(Croatia) D Ajduković	6	5	6
LL	(Japan) R Noguchi	0	7	3
4	(Germany) B Hassan	3	4
(Chinese Taipei) T-l Wu	6	6
Q	(South Korea) Y-s Chung	7^{7}	3	1^{r}
(Chinese Taipei) J Jung	6^{2}	6	4

Quarterfinals
1	(Austria) J Rodionov	6^{5}	6	1
(Croatia) D Ajduković	7^{7}	4	6
(Chinese Taipei) T-l Wu	6	6
(Chinese Taipei) J Jung	4	3

Semifinals
(Croatia) D Ajduković	7	5	6
(Chinese Taipei) T-l Wu	5	7	3

=== Bottom half ===
First round
6	(Australia) M Polmans	6	7
Q	(United States) A Fenty	2	5
(United States) A Martin	4	4
(France) G Blancaneaux	6	6
Q	(Denmark) A Holmgren	6	6
(Tunisia) M Echargui	4	3
WC	(Japan) T Ichikawa	5	2
3	(Italy) L Nardi	7	6
5	(Japan) S Shimabukuro	6	7^{7}
(Japan) K Uchida	1	6^{5}
Alt	(Australia) O Jasika	3	1
(South Korea) S-c Hong	6	6
Q	(North Macedonia) K Ivanovski	1	0^{r}
LL	(China) Y Bai	6	4
Q	(Italy) G Fonio	6	2	3
2	(Japan) S Mochizuki	4	6	6

Second round
6	(Australia) M Polmans	6	7^{7}
(France) G Blancaneaux	4	6^{3}
Q	(Denmark) A Holmgren	3	6	5
3	(Italy) L Nardi	6	3	7
5	(Japan) S Shimabukuro	6	7^{7}
(South Korea) S-c Hong	4	6^{4}
LL	(China) Y Bai	3	2
2	(Japan) S Mochizuki	6	6

Quarterfinals
6	(Australia) M Polmans	2	4
3	(Italy) L Nardi	6	6
5	(Japan) S Shimabukuro	6	6
2	(Japan) S Mochizuki	3	3

Semifinals
3	(Italy) L Nardi	2	2
5	(Japan) S Shimabukuro	6	6
