= 2024 Kobe Challenger – Singles =

Singles
- 2024 Kobe Challenger

Final
- Champion: (Belgium) Alexander Blockx
- Runner-up: (Austria) Jurij Rodionov
- Score: 6–3, 6–1

Events
Singles	Doubles
← 2023 ·	Kobe Challenger	· 2025 →

Duje Ajduković was the defending champion but chose not to defend his title.

Alexander Blockx won the title after defeating Jurij Rodionov 6–3, 6–1 in the final.

== Seeds ==
1. (China) Bu Yunchaokete (second round)
2. (Japan) Taro Daniel (semifinals)
3. (Italy) Mattia Bellucci (semifinals)
4. (United States) Nicolas Moreno de Alboran (first round)
5. (Italy) Matteo Gigante (first round)
6. (Japan) Yasutaka Uchiyama (quarterfinals)
7. (France) Térence Atmane (second round)
8. (Hong Kong) Coleman Wong (first round)

== Draw ==
=== Key ===
- Q = Qualifier
- WC = Wild card
- LL = Lucky loser
- Alt = Alternate
- SE = Special exempt
- PR = Protected ranking
- ITF = ITF entry
- JE = Junior exempt
- w/o = Walkover
- r = Retired
- d = Defaulted
- SR = Special ranking

=== Finals ===
Semifinals
(Austria) Jurij Rodionov	7	6
3	(Italy) Mattia Bellucci	5	3
(Belgium) Alexander Blockx	6	7^{7}
2	(Japan) Taro Daniel	1	6^{2}

Final
(Austria) Jurij Rodionov	3	1
(Belgium) Alexander Blockx	6	6

=== Top half ===
First round
1	(China) Y Bu	6	6
Q	(Sweden) E Ymer	4	4
(Austria) J Rodionov	6	6
Q	(Japan) R Sakamoto	3	2
(Japan) S Mochizuki	1	6	3
(Australia) L Tu	6	3	6
(Japan) S Shimabukuro	7^{7}	6
8	(Hong Kong) C Wong	6^{5}	2
3	(Italy) M Bellucci	7^{7}	6
(Japan) Y Shimizu	6^{1}	4
Q	(Japan) H Moriya	6	3	4
(Australia) A Bolt	4	6	6
(Lebanon) B Hassan	4	6	6
(Australia) O Jasika	6	4	1
(Australia) J McCabe	2	6	6
5	(Italy) M Gigante	6	1	4

Second round
1	(China) Y Bu	6^{3}	5
(Austria) J Rodionov	7^{7}	7
(Australia) L Tu	6	2	2
(Japan) S Shimabukuro	4	6	6
3	(Italy) M Bellucci	6	6
(Australia) A Bolt	0	4
(Lebanon) B Hassan	6	7^{7}
(Australia) J McCabe	2	6^{3}

Quarterfinals
(Austria) J Rodionov	6^{5}	6	7^{7}
(Japan) S Shimabukuro	7^{7}	1	6^{3}
3	(Italy) M Bellucci	6	6
(Lebanon) B Hassan	1	4

Semifinals
(Austria) J Rodionov	7	6
3	(Italy) M Bellucci	5	3

=== Bottom half ===
First round
7	(France) T Atmane	7^{7}	7^{7}
WC	(Japan) Ryuki Matsuda	6^{3}	6^{5}
(Australia) M Polmans	5	0^{r}
WC	(Japan) Y Watanuki	7	0
Q	(Thailand) K Samrej	6^{3}	2
(Belgium) A Blockx	7^{7}	6
(France) C Lestienne	6	6
4	(United States) N Moreno de Alboran	3	2
6	(Japan) Y Uchiyama	6	7^{8}
Q	(Netherlands) G den Ouden	3	6^{6}
(Australia) T Schoolkate	6^{4}	6	2
(Chinese Taipei) T-l Wu	7^{7}	4	6
(Croatia) M Dodig	6	6^{4}	7
WC	(Japan) N Nakagawa	4	7^{7}	5
Q	(Japan) K Uchida	2	6	4
2	(Japan) T Daniel	6	3	6

Second round
7	(France) T Atmane	6^{5}	5
WC	(Japan) Y Watanuki	7^{7}	7
(Belgium) A Blockx	6	6
(France) C Lestienne	4	4
6	(Japan) Y Uchiyama	7^{7}	4	6
(Chinese Taipei) T-l Wu	6^{3}	6	3
(Croatia) M Dodig	2	2
2	(Japan) T Daniel	6	6

Quarterfinals
WC	(Japan) Y Watanuki	2	6	6^{6}
(Belgium) A Blockx	6	3	7^{8}
6	(Japan) Y Uchiyama	3	4
2	(Japan) T Daniel	6	6

Semifinals
(Belgium) A Blockx	6	7^{7}
2	(Japan) T Daniel	1	6^{2}
