= 2022 Kobe Challenger – Singles =

Singles
- 2022 Kobe Challenger

Final
- Champion: (Japan) Yosuke Watanuki
- Runner-up: (Portugal) Frederico Ferreira Silva
- Score: 6–7^{(3–7)}, 7–5, 6–4

Events
Singles	Doubles
← 2019 ·	Kobe Challenger	· 2023 →

Yosuke Watanuki was the defending champion and successfully defended his title, defeating Frederico Ferreira Silva 6–7^{(3–7)}, 7–5, 6–4 in the final.

== Seeds ==
1. (Australia) Christopher O'Connell (semifinals)
2. (Australia) John Millman (quarterfinals)
3. (Australia) Rinky Hijikata (second round)
4. (Japan) Kaichi Uchida (first round)
5. (Australia) James Duckworth (first round)
6. (Bosnia and Herzegovina) Damir Džumhur (second round)
7. (Japan) Yosuke Watanuki (champion)
8. (Australia) Li Tu (first round)

== Draw ==
=== Key ===
- Q = Qualifier
- WC = Wild card
- LL = Lucky loser
- Alt = Alternate
- ITF = ITF entry
- PR = Protected ranking
- SR = Special ranking
- SE = Special exempt
- JE = Junior exempt
- JR = Junior Accelerator Programme entrant
- CO = College Accelerator Programme entrant
- NG = Next Gen Accelerator Program entrant
- w/o = Walkover
- r = Retired
- d = Defaulted

=== Finals ===
Semifinals
1	(Australia) Christopher O'Connell	4	6^{6}
7	(Japan) Yosuke Watanuki	6	7^{8}
(Portugal) Frederico Ferreira Silva	6	3	6
(Croatia) Nino Serdarušić	4	6	3

Final
7	(Japan) Yosuke Watanuki	6^{3}	7	6
(Portugal) Frederico Ferreira Silva	7^{7}	5	4

=== Top half ===
First round
1	(Australia) C O'Connell	6^{7}	7^{12}	7^{7}
Q	(Northern Mariana Islands) C Sinclair	7^{9}	6^{10}	6^{3}
PR	(Japan) Y Sugita	6	4	4
(Kazakhstan) B Zhukayev	4	6	6
(Czech Republic) Z Kolář	6	2
PR	(Japan) T Ito	3	0^{r}
Q	(Australia) M Polmans	6^{3}	6	6
8	(Australia) L Tu	7^{7}	2	3
4	(Japan) K Uchida	4	6	3
(India) R Ramanathan	6	4	6
Q	(Chinese Taipei) J Jung	3	6	6
(Japan) R Noguchi	6	4	1
(Japan) S Shimabukuro	5
(Japan) Y Uchiyama	1^{r}
Q	(South Korea) Y-s Chung	2	2
7	(Japan) Yo Watanuki	6	6

Second round
1	(Australia) C O'Connell	6	6^{5}	6
(Kazakhstan) B Zhukayev	2	7^{7}	1
(Czech Republic) Z Kolář	1	4
Q	(Australia) M Polmans	6	6
(India) R Ramanathan	2	6	4
Q	(Chinese Taipei) J Jung	6	0	0^{r}
(Japan) S Shimabukuro	4	2
7	(Japan) Yo Watanuki	6	6

Quarterfinals
1	(Australia) C O'Connell	7	7^{7}
Q	(Australia) M Polmans	5	6^{3}
(India) R Ramanathan	5	1
7	(Japan) Yo Watanuki	7	6

Semifinals
1	(Australia) C O'Connell	4	6^{6}
7	(Japan) Yo Watanuki	6	7^{8}

=== Bottom half ===
First round
5	(Australia) J Duckworth	4	4
WC	(Japan) S Hazawa	6	6
Q	(Japan) S Mochizuki	4	2
Q	(Japan) N Nakagawa	6	6
(Vietnam) NH Lý	2	4
(Portugal) F Ferreira Silva	6	6
(Australia) D Sweeny	3	6	2
3	(Australia) R Hijikata	6	1	6
6	(Bosnia and Herzegovina) D Džumhur	6	6
WC	(Japan) T Ichikawa	4	3
(Croatia) N Serdarušić	6	6^{7}	6
(Romania) ND Ionel	3	7^{9}	2
WC	(Japan) Shintaro Imai	6	6
(Japan) H Moriya	4	3
(Romania) FC Jianu	3	6	4
2	(Australia) J Millman	6	3	6

Second round
WC	(Japan) S Hazawa	6	6
Q	(Japan) N Nakagawa	4	4
(Portugal) F Ferreira Silva	6	6
3	(Australia) R Hijikata	4	2
6	(Bosnia and Herzegovina) D Džumhur	6	1	3
(Croatia) N Serdarušić	4	6	6
WC	(Japan) S Imai	1	4
2	(Australia) J Millman	6	6

Quarterfinals
WC	(Japan) S Hazawa	6	3	6^{4}
(Portugal) F Ferreira Silva	2	6	7^{7}
(Croatia) N Serdarušić	7^{7}	7
2	(Australia) J Millman	6^{2}	5

Semifinals
(Portugal) F Ferreira Silva	6	3	6
(Croatia) N Serdarušić	4	6	3
