= 2017 Kobe Challenger – Doubles =

Doubles
- 2017 Kobe Challenger

Final
- Champions: (Japan) Ben McLachlan (Japan) Yasutaka Uchiyama
- Runners-up: (India) Jeevan Nedunchezhiyan (Indonesia) Christopher Rungkat
- Score: 4–6, 6–3, [10–8]

Events
| Singles | Doubles |
| ← 2016 · | Kobe Challenger | · 2018 → |

Daniel Masur and Ante Pavić were the defending champions but chose not to defend their title.

Ben McLachlan and Yasutaka Uchiyama won the title after defeating Jeevan Nedunchezhiyan and Christopher Rungkat 4–6, 6–3, [10–8] in the final.

== Seeds ==
1. (Australia) Matt Reid / (Australia) Andrew Whittington (first round)
2. (Australia) Alex Bolt / (Australia) Bradley Mousley (semifinals)
3. (Thailand) Sanchai Ratiwatana / (Thailand) Sonchat Ratiwatana (semifinals)
4. (India) Jeevan Nedunchezhiyan / (Indonesia) Christopher Rungkat (final)

== Draw ==
=== Key ===
- Q = Qualifier
- WC = Wild card
- LL = Lucky loser
- Alt = Alternate
- SE = Special exempt
- PR = Protected ranking
- ITF = ITF entry
- JE = Junior exempt
- w/o = Walkover
- r = Retired
- d = Defaulted
- SR = Special ranking

First round
1 | (Australia) M Reid (Australia) A Whittington | 4 | 4
(Japan) B McLachlan (Japan) Y Uchiyama | 6 | 6
WC | (Japan) Yuya Kibi (Japan) Ken Onishi | 6 | 6
WC | (Japan) S Hazawa (Japan) Y Shimizu | 4 | 4
3 | (Thailand) Sa Ratiwatana (Thailand) So Ratiwatana | 6 | 2 | [10]
(Japan) T Matsui (Chinese Taipei) C-h Yi | 3 | 6 | [5]
(United States) A Krajicek (United States) J Withrow | 6^{1} | 6^{3}
(Australia) M Purcell (Australia) A Santillan | 7^{7} | 7^{7}
(China) X Gao (China) Ze Zhang | 6 | 6
(Russia) T Gabashvili (Canada) P Polansky | 4 | 4
(Japan) T Ito (Japan) Y Takahashi | 6^{5} | 3
4 | (India) J Nedunchezhiyan (Indonesia) C Rungkat | 7^{7} | 6
(Philippines) R Gonzales (United States) H Reese | 3 | 4
(China) M Gong (Chinese Taipei) H-y Peng | 6 | 6
WC | (Japan) S Shimabukuro (Japan) K Uesugi | 3 | 3
2 | (Australia) A Bolt (Australia) B Mousley | 6 | 6

Quarterfinals
(Japan) B McLachlan (Japan) Y Uchiyama | 6 | 7
WC | (Japan) Y Kibi (Japan) K Onishi | 4 | 5
3 | (Thailand) Sa Ratiwatana (Thailand) So Ratiwatana | 6 | 7
(Australia) M Purcell (Australia) A Santillan | 2 | 5
(China) X Gao (China) Ze Zhang | 2 | 3
4 | (India) J Nedunchezhiyan (Indonesia) C Rungkat | 6 | 6
(China) M Gong (Chinese Taipei) H-y Peng | 3 | 7 | [9]
2 | (Australia) A Bolt (Australia) B Mousley | 6 | 5 | [11]

Semifinals
(Japan) B McLachlan (Japan) Y Uchiyama | 6 | 6
3 | (Thailand) Sa Ratiwatana (Thailand) So Ratiwatana | 3 | 4
4 | (India) J Nedunchezhiyan (Indonesia) C Rungkat | 6^{7} | 6 | [10]
2 | (Australia) A Bolt (Australia) B Mousley | 7^{9} | 4 | [7]

Final
(Japan) B McLachlan (Japan) Y Uchiyama | 4 | 6 | [10]
4 | (India) J Nedunchezhiyan (Indonesia) C Rungkat | 6 | 3 | [8]
