= 2018 Kobe Challenger – Singles =

Singles
- 2018 Kobe Challenger

Final
- Champion: (Japan) Tatsuma Ito
- Runner-up: (Japan) Yosuke Watanuki
- Score: 3–6, 7–5, 6–3

Events
Singles	Doubles
- Kobe Challenger

Stéphane Robert was the defending champion but chose not to defend his title.

Tatsuma Ito won the title after defeating Yosuke Watanuki 3–6, 7–5, 6–3 in the final.

== Seeds ==
1. (Japan) Yoshihito Nishioka (semifinals)
2. (Japan) Tatsuma Ito (champion)
3. (Japan) Hiroki Moriya (quarterfinals)
4. (Japan) Go Soeda (quarterfinals)
5. (South Korea) Lee Duck-hee (withdrew)
6. (Japan) Yasutaka Uchiyama (semifinals)
7. (Japan) Yosuke Watanuki (final)
8. (South Korea) Kwon Soon-woo (quarterfinals)

== Draw ==
Key

- Q = Qualifier
- WC = Wild card
- LL = Lucky loser
- Alt = Alternate
- ITF = ITF entry
- PR = Protected ranking
- SR = Special ranking
- SE = Special exempt
- JE = Junior exempt
- JR = Junior Accelerator Programme entrant
- CO = College Accelerator Programme entrant
- NG = Next Gen Accelerator Program entrant
- w/o = Walkover
- r = Retired
- d = Defaulted

=== Finals ===
Semifinals
1	(Japan) Yoshihito Nishioka	0	6	5
7	(Japan) Yosuke Watanuki	6	4	7
6	(Japan) Yasutaka Uchiyama	6	0	4
2	(Japan) Tatsuma Ito	4	6	6

Final
7	(Japan) Yosuke Watanuki	6	5	3
2	(Japan) Tatsuma Ito	3	7	6

=== Top half ===
First round
1	(Japan) Y Nishioka	7	6
(Tunisia) M Echargui	5	1
Q	(Australia) A Vukic	6	6
Q	(Northern Mariana Islands) C Sinclair	1	1
(Australia) A Santillan	6	7^{8}
(Japan) Makoto Ochi	3	6^{6}
(Japan) Renta Tokuda	3	6	1
8	(South Korea) S-w Kwon	6	1	6
4	(Japan) G Soeda	6	6
WC	(Japan) K Uesugi	3	1
WC	(Japan) S Hazawa	3	6	3
Q	(Australia) A Harris	6	3	6
(Portugal) G Oliveira	6	6
(Finland) E Ruusuvuori	3	4
(China) Z Li	4^{r}
7	(Japan) Yo Watanuki	4

Second round
1	(Japan) Y Nishioka	6	7^{7}
Q	(Australia) A Vukic	2	6^{2}
(Australia) A Santillan	2	7	6^{3}
8	(South Korea) S-w Kwon	6	5	7^{7}
4	(Japan) G Soeda	6	7
Q	(Australia) A Harris	3	5
(Portugal) G Oliveira	5	0
7	(Japan) Yo Watanuki	7	6

Quarterfinals
1	(Japan) Y Nishioka	6	3	6
8	(South Korea) S-w Kwon	1	6	4
4	(Japan) G Soeda	4	4
7	(Japan) Yo Watanuki	6	6

Semifinals
1	(Japan) Y Nishioka	0	6	5
7	(Japan) Yo Watanuki	6	4	7

=== Bottom half ===
First round
6	(Japan) Y Uchiyama	3	6	6
(Japan) Shintaro Imai	6	3	2
Q	(Chinese Taipei) T-l Wu	6	6
WC	(Japan) Hiroyasu Ehara	3	2
(Spain) J Samper Montaña	6	6
WC	(Japan) Shuichi Sekiguchi	4	1
(South Korea) Kim Cheong-eui	0	6^{0}
3	(Japan) H Moriya	6	7^{7}
LL	(Vietnam) NH Lý	6^{4}	7^{11}	6
(South Korea) J-s Nam	7^{7}	6^{9}	2
(South Korea) Y-s Chung	7^{7}	7^{7}
(Netherlands) J Sels	6^{3}	6^{3}
(Japan) Y Shimizu	6	7
(China) Ze Zhang	1	5
(China) D Wu	4	3
2	(Japan) T Ito	6	6

Second round
6	(Japan) Y Uchiyama	7^{7}	6
Q	(Chinese Taipei) T-l Wu	6^{0}	3
(Spain) J Samper Montaña	6	5	3
3	(Japan) H Moriya	3	7	6
LL	(Vietnam) NH Lý	4	2
(South Korea) Y-s Chung	6	6
(Japan) Y Shimizu	6^{6}	1
2	(Japan) T Ito	7^{8}	6

Quarterfinals
6	(Japan) Y Uchiyama	6	6
3	(Japan) H Moriya	3	2
(South Korea) Y-s Chung	2	3
2	(Japan) T Ito	6	6

Semifinals
6	(Japan) Y Uchiyama	6	0	4
2	(Japan) T Ito	4	6	6
