= 2017 Kobe Challenger =

Tennis tournament

- Date: 6–12 November
- Edition: 3rd
- Surface: Hard (indoor)
- Location: Kobe, Japan

Champions

Singles
- (France) Stéphane Robert

Doubles
- (Japan) Ben McLachlan / (Japan) Yasutaka Uchiyama
← 2016 ·	Kobe Challenger	· 2018 →

The 2017 Kobe Challenger was a professional tennis tournament played on indoor hard courts. It was the 3rd edition of the tournament which was part of the 2017 ATP Challenger Tour. It took place in Kobe, Japan between 6 and 12 November 2017.

== Singles main-draw entrants ==
=== Seeds ===
Country	Player	Rank^{1}	Seed
MDA	Radu Albot	103	1
JPN	Taro Daniel	108	2
AUS	Matthew Ebden	117	3
CAN	Peter Polansky	128	4
JPN	Tatsuma Ito	147	5
AUS	Akira Santillan	148	6
JPN	Go Soeda	157	7
AUS	John Millman	188	8

- ^{1} Rankings are as of 30 October 2017.

=== Other entrants ===
The following players received wildcards into the singles main draw:

- (Japan) Yuya Kibi
- (Japan) Ken Onishi
- (Japan) Yuta Shimizu
- (Japan) Kaito Uesugi

The following player received entry into the singles main draw as a special exempt:

- (Poland) Hubert Hurkacz

The following players received entry from the qualifying draw:

- (Japan) Sora Fukuda
- (Australia) Marinko Matosevic
- (Austria) Lucas Miedler
- (Japan) Yosuke Watanuki

== Champions ==
=== Singles ===
- (France) Stéphane Robert def. (France) Calvin Hemery 7–6^{(7–1)}, 6–7^{(5–7)}, 6–1.

=== Doubles ===
- (Japan) Ben McLachlan / (Japan) Yasutaka Uchiyama def. (India) Jeevan Nedunchezhiyan / (Indonesia) Christopher Rungkat 4–6, 6–3, [10–8].
