= 2019 Kobe Challenger =

Tennis tournament

- Date: 4–10 November
- Edition: 5th
- Surface: Hard (indoor)
- Location: Kobe, Japan

Champions

Singles
- (Japan) Yosuke Watanuki

Doubles
- (India) Purav Raja / (India) Ramkumar Ramanathan
← 2018 ·	Kobe Challenger	· 2022 →

The 2019 Hyōgo Noah Challenger was a professional tennis tournament played on indoor hard courts. It was the 5th edition of the tournament which was part of the 2019 ATP Challenger Tour. It took place in Kobe, Japan between 4 and 10 November 2019.

== Singles main-draw entrants ==
=== Seeds ===
Country	Player	Rank^{1}	Seed
JPN	Yasutaka Uchiyama	86	1
JPN	Yūichi Sugita	108	2
JPN	Go Soeda	126	3
AUS	James Duckworth	130	4
JPN	Tatsuma Ito	134	5
~~CHN~~	~~Zhang Zhizhen~~	~~185~~	~~6~~
ESP	Enrique López Pérez	186	7
GBR	Jay Clarke	190	8
IND	Ramkumar Ramanathan	195	9
CHN	Bai Yan	221	10
JPN	Hiroki Moriya	224	11
TPE	Wu Tung-lin	234	12
CHN	Li Zhe	243	13
AUS	Akira Santillan	245	14
KOR	Lee Duck-hee	257	15
KOR	Nam Ji-sung	261	16

- ^{1} Rankings are as of 28 October 2019.

=== Other entrants ===
The following players received wildcards into the singles main draw:

- (Japan) Shinji Hazawa
- (Japan) Taisei Ichikawa
- (Japan) Yuki Mochizuki
- (Japan) Ryota Tanuma
- (Japan) Seita Watanabe

The following player received entry into the singles main draw using a protected ranking:

- (Australia) Bradley Mousley

The following players received entry into the singles main draw as alternates:

- (Japan) Ken Onishi
- (Japan) Takashi Saito

The following players received entry from the qualifying draw:

- (Japan) Yuta Kawahashi
- (Kazakhstan) Timur Khabibulin

The following players received entry as lucky losers:

- (Japan) Ren Nakamura
- (Japan) Kazuki Nishiwaki

== Champions ==
=== Singles ===
- (Japan) Yosuke Watanuki def. (Japan) Yūichi Sugita 6–2, 6–4.

=== Doubles ===
- (India) Purav Raja / (India) Ramkumar Ramanathan def. (Sweden) André Göransson / (Indonesia) Christopher Rungkat 7–6^{(8–6)}, 6–3.
