= 2018 Kobe Challenger – Doubles =

Doubles
- 2018 Kobe Challenger

Final
- Champions: (Portugal) Gonçalo Oliveira (Australia) Akira Santillan
- Runners-up: (China) Li Zhe (Japan) Go Soeda
- Score: 2–6, 6–4, [12–10]

Events
Singles	Doubles
- Kobe Challenger

Ben McLachlan and Yasutaka Uchiyama were the defending champions but only Uchiyama chose to defend his title, partnering Kaito Uesugi. Uchiyama withdrew before his semifinal match.

Gonçalo Oliveira and Akira Santillan won the title after defeating Li Zhe and Go Soeda 2–6, 6–4, [12–10] in the final.

== Seeds ==
1. (China) Gong Maoxin / (China) Zhang Ze (first round)
2. (Portugal) Gonçalo Oliveira / (Australia) Akira Santillan (champions)
3. (Croatia) Ivan Sabanov / (Croatia) Matej Sabanov (first round)
4. (Japan) Yasutaka Uchiyama / (Japan) Kaito Uesugi (semifinals, withdrew)

== Draw ==
Key

- Q = Qualifier
- WC = Wild card
- LL = Lucky loser
- Alt = Alternate
- ITF = ITF entry
- PR = Protected ranking
- SR = Special ranking
- SE = Special exempt
- JE = Junior exempt
- JR = Junior Accelerator Programme entrant
- CO = College Accelerator Programme entrant
- NG = Next Gen Accelerator Program entrant
- w/o = Walkover
- r = Retired
- d = Defaulted

First round
1	(China) M Gong (China) Ze Zhang	7^{7}	4	[8]
(China) Z Li (Japan) G Soeda	6^{4}	6	[10]
WC	(Japan) S Hazawa (Japan) Y Shimizu	6	6
(Tunisia) M Echargui (Netherlands) J Sels	2	3
3	(Croatia) I Sabanov (Croatia) M Sabanov	2	6	[6]
(Japan) H Moriya (Spain) J Samper Montaña	6	4	[10]
WC	(Japan) Yuki Mochizuki (Japan) R Noguchi	2	6	[9]
WC	(Japan) Yuya Kibi (Japan) T Niki	6	2	[11]
(Chinese Taipei) J Wang (China) D Wu	6	5	[8]
Alt	(South Korea) Kim Cheong-eui (Japan) Makoto Ochi	1	7	[10]
(Japan) Y Nishioka (Japan) Yo Watanuki	6^{5}	5
4	(Japan) Y Uchiyama (Japan) K Uesugi	7^{7}	7
(Japan) Shintaro Imai (Japan) Renta Tokuda	7^{7}	6
(China) X Gao (Finland) E Ruusuvuori	6^{5}	1
(South Korea) Y-s Chung (South Korea) S-w Kwon	4	2
2	(Portugal) G Oliveira (Australia) A Santillan	6	6

Quarterfinals
(China) Z Li (Japan) G Soeda	6	6
WC	(Japan) S Hazawa (Japan) Y Shimizu	3	4
(Japan) H Moriya (Spain) J Samper Montaña	6	2^{r}
WC	(Japan) Y Kibi (Japan) T Niki	2	4
Alt	(South Korea) C-e Kim (Japan) M Ochi	1	3
4	(Japan) Y Uchiyama (Japan) K Uesugi	6	6
(Japan) S Imai (Japan) R Tokuda	3	4
2	(Portugal) G Oliveira (Australia) A Santillan	6	6

Semifinals
(China) Z Li (Japan) G Soeda	6	4	[10]
WC	(Japan) Y Kibi (Japan) T Niki	1	6	[7]
4	(Japan) Y Uchiyama (Japan) K Uesugi
2	(Portugal) G Oliveira (Australia) A Santillan	w/o

Final
(China) Z Li (Japan) G Soeda	6	4	[10]
2	(Portugal) G Oliveira (Australia) A Santillan	2	6	[12]
