= 2016 Kobe Challenger – Doubles =

Doubles
- 2016 Kobe Challenger

Final
- Champions: (Germany) Daniel Masur (Croatia) Ante Pavić
- Runners-up: (India) Jeevan Nedunchezhiyan (Indonesia) Christopher Rungkat
- Score: 4–6, 6–3, [10–6]

Events
Singles	Doubles
← 2015 ·	Kobe Challenger	· 2017 →

Sanchai Ratiwatana and Sonchat Ratiwatana were the defending champions but only Sonchat Ratiwatana defended his title, partnering Yi Chu-huan. Ratiwatana lost in the semifinals to Daniel Masur and Ante Pavić.

Masur and Pavić won the title after defeating Jeevan Nedunchezhiyan and Christopher Rungkat 4–6, 6–3, [10–6] in the final.

== Seeds ==
1. (Australia) Matt Reid / (Australia) John-Patrick Smith (first round)
2. (Thailand) Sonchat Ratiwatana / (Chinese Taipei) Yi Chu-huan (semifinals)
3. (Chinese Taipei) Peng Hsien-yin / (Japan) Yasutaka Uchiyama (first round)
4. (India) Jeevan Nedunchezhiyan / (Indonesia) Christopher Rungkat (final)

== Draw ==
=== Key ===
- Q = Qualifier
- WC = Wild card
- LL = Lucky loser
- Alt = Alternate
- SE = Special exempt
- PR = Protected ranking
- ITF = ITF entry
- JE = Junior exempt
- w/o = Walkover
- r = Retired
- d = Defaulted
- SR = Special ranking

First round
1	(Australia) M Reid (Australia) J-P Smith	4	7	[6]
(Belarus) S Betov (Belarus) Y Shyla	6	5	[10]
WC	(Japan) Y Ito (Japan) Ken Onishi	4	4
(Japan) T Ito (Germany) P Petzschner	6	6
4	(India) J Nedunchezhiyan (Indonesia) C Rungkat	6	6
(Chinese Taipei) T Chen (Israel) A Weintraub	0	4
(Philippines) R Gonzales (Japan) T Matsui	6	6
WC	(Japan) K Uesugi (Japan) Hiroki Yata	4	4
(Germany) D Masur (Croatia) A Pavić	7^{7}	6
(France) L Lokoli (France) A Michon	6^{5}	3
WC	(Japan) Yo Watanuki (Japan) Yu Watanuki	2	6	[11]
3	(Chinese Taipei) H-y Peng (Japan) Y Uchiyama	6	3	[9]
(Japan) H Moriya (Japan) Shuichi Sekiguchi	3	6	[7]
(Japan) T Daniel (Australia) L Saville	6	4	[10]
(Japan) Yuya Kibi (Japan) T Niki	3	2
2	(Thailand) So Ratiwatana (Chinese Taipei) C-h Yi	6	6

Quarterfinals
(Belarus) S Betov (Belarus) Y Shyla	6	2	[10]
(Japan) T Ito (Germany) P Petzschner	1	6	[6]
4	(India) J Nedunchezhiyan (Indonesia) C Rungkat	2	7	[10]
(Philippines) R Gonzales (Japan) T Matsui	6	5	[8]
(Germany) D Masur (Croatia) A Pavić	2	6	[10]
WC	(Japan) Yo Watanuki (Japan) Yu Watanuki	6	3	[5]
(Japan) T Daniel (Australia) L Saville	3	3
2	(Thailand) So Ratiwatana (Chinese Taipei) C-h Yi	6	6

Semifinals
(Belarus) S Betov (Belarus) Y Shyla	3	1
4	(India) J Nedunchezhiyan (Indonesia) C Rungkat	6	6
(Germany) D Masur (Croatia) A Pavić	3	7	[10]
2	(Thailand) So Ratiwatana (Chinese Taipei) C-h Yi	6	5	[8]

Final
4	(India) J Nedunchezhiyan (Indonesia) C Rungkat	6	3	[6]
(Germany) D Masur (Croatia) A Pavić	4	6	[10]
