= 2023 Kobe Challenger =

- Date: 13–19 November
- Edition: 7th
- Surface: Hard (indoor)
- Location: Kobe, Japan

Champions

Singles
- (Croatia) Duje Ajduković

Doubles
- (United States) Evan King / (United States) Reese Stalder
| ← 2022 · | Kobe Challenger | · 2024 → |

The 2023 Hyōgo Noah Challenger was a professional tennis tournament played on indoor hard courts. It was the 7th edition of the tournament which was part of the 2023 ATP Challenger Tour. It took place in Kobe, Japan between 13 and 19 November 2023.

== Singles main-draw entrants ==
=== Seeds ===
| Country | Player | Rank^{1} | Seed |
|---|---|---|---|
| AUT | Jurij Rodionov | 110 | 1 |
| JPN | Shintaro Mochizuki | 129 | 2 |
| ITA | Luca Nardi | 143 | 3 |
| GER | Benjamin Hassan | 150 | 4 |
| JPN | Sho Shimabukuro | 155 | 5 |
| AUS | Marc Polmans | 158 | 6 |
| ~~CHN~~ | ~~Bu Yunchaokete~~ | ~~167~~ | ~~7~~ |
| CZE | Zdeněk Kolář | 175 | 8 |

- ^{1} Rankings are as of 6 November 2023.

=== Other entrants ===
The following players received wildcards into the singles main draw:

- (Japan) Taisei Ichikawa
- (Japan) Tatsuma Ito
- (Japan) Renta Tokuda

The following player received entry into the singles main draw as an alternate:

- (Australia) Omar Jasika

The following players received entry from the qualifying draw:

- (South Korea) Chung Yun-seong
- (United States) Andrew Fenty
- (Italy) Giovanni Fonio
- (Denmark) August Holmgren
- (North Macedonia) Kalin Ivanovski
- (Japan) Yasutaka Uchiyama

The following players received entry as lucky losers:

- (China) Bai Yan
- (Japan) Rio Noguchi

== Champions ==
=== Singles ===
- (Croatia) Duje Ajduković def. (Japan) Sho Shimabukuro 6–4, 6–2.

=== Doubles ===
- (United States) Evan King / (United States) Reese Stalder def. (Australia) Andrew Harris / (South Korea) Nam Ji-sung 7–6^{(7–3)}, 2–6, [10–7].
