= 2019 Kobe Challenger – Singles =

Singles
- 2019 Kobe Challenger

Final
- Champion: (Japan) Yosuke Watanuki
- Runner-up: (Japan) Yūichi Sugita
- Score: 6–2, 6–4

Events
Singles	Doubles
- Kobe Challenger

Tatsuma Ito was the defending champion but retired in the second round to Tseng Chun-hsin.

Yosuke Watanuki won the title after defeating Yūichi Sugita 6–2, 6–4 in the final.

== Seeds ==
All seeds receive a bye into the second round.

1. (Japan) Yasutaka Uchiyama (second round, retired)
2. (Japan) Yūichi Sugita (final)
3. (Japan) Go Soeda (quarterfinals)
4. (Australia) James Duckworth (second round)
5. (Japan) Tatsuma Ito (second round, retired)
6. (China) Zhang Zhizhen (withdrew)
7. (Spain) Enrique López Pérez (second round)
8. (United Kingdom) Jay Clarke (third round)
9. (India) Ramkumar Ramanathan (quarterfinals)
10. (China) Bai Yan (second round)
11. (Japan) Hiroki Moriya (quarterfinals)
12. (Chinese Taipei) Wu Tung-lin (second round)
13. (China) Li Zhe (second round)
14. (Australia) Akira Santillan (second round, retired)
15. (South Korea) Lee Duck-hee (second round)
16. (South Korea) Nam Ji-sung (quarterfinals, retired)

== Draw ==
Key

- Q = Qualifier
- WC = Wild card
- LL = Lucky loser
- Alt = Alternate
- ITF = ITF entry
- PR = Protected ranking
- SR = Special ranking
- SE = Special exempt
- JE = Junior exempt
- JR = Junior Accelerator Programme entrant
- CO = College Accelerator Programme entrant
- NG = Next Gen Accelerator Program entrant
- w/o = Walkover
- r = Retired
- d = Defaulted

=== Finals ===
Quarterfinals
16	(South Korea) Nam Ji-sung	4	2^{r}
(Japan) Yosuke Watanuki	6	2
3	(Japan) Go Soeda	3	6	6^{6}
(Netherlands) Tim van Rijthoven	6	3	7^{8}
11	(Japan) Hiroki Moriya	3	6^{4}
(Japan) Shintaro Imai	6	7^{7}
9	(India) Ramkumar Ramanathan	2	3
2	(Japan) Yūichi Sugita	6	6

Semifinals
(Japan) Yosuke Watanuki	6	6
(Netherlands) Tim van Rijthoven	1	2
(Japan) Shintaro Imai	3	6	1
2	(Japan) Yūichi Sugita	6	4	6

Final
(Japan) Yosuke Watanuki	6	6
2	(Japan) Yūichi Sugita	2	4

=== Top half ===
==== Section 1 ====
First round
WC	(Japan) Yuki Mochizuki	2	6	3
(Japan) Makoto Ochi	6	2	0^{r}
(Israel) B Patael	6	6
(Japan) Shuichi Sekiguchi	3	2
LL	(Japan) Kazuki Nishiwaki	3	4
(Japan) Yo Watanuki	6	6
Q	(Kazakhstan) T Khabibulin	0	2
WC	(Japan) T Ichikawa	6	6

Second round
1	(Japan) Y Uchiyama	5	2^{r}
WC	(Japan) Y Mochizuki	7	3
(Israel) B Patael	2	4
16	(South Korea) J-s Nam	6	6
10	(China) Y Bai	3	1
(Japan) Yo Watanuki	6	6
WC	(Japan) T Ichikawa	5	6	7^{8}
7	(Spain) E López Pérez	7	2	6^{6}

Third round
WC	(Japan) Y Mochizuki	3	6	1
16	(South Korea) J-s Nam	6	1	6
(Japan) Yo Watanuki	6	6
WC	(Japan) T Ichikawa	2	1

Quarterfinals
16	(South Korea) J-s Nam	4	2^{r}
(Japan) Yo Watanuki	6	2

==== Section 2 ====
First round
(India) A Kadhe	6^{8}	3
(Finland) P Niklas-Salminen	7^{10}	6
Alt	(Japan) Takashi Saito	6^{1}	3
(Japan) S Shimabukuro	7^{7}	6
(Netherlands) T van Rijthoven	6	6
(Portugal) G Oliveira	1	4
(United Kingdom) B Klein	6^{4}	3
(Australia) L Saville	7^{7}	6

Second round
3	(Japan) G Soeda	7^{8}	6
(Finland) P Niklas-Salminen	6^{6}	2
(Japan) S Shimabukuro	3	7^{7}	6
13	(China) Z Li	6	6^{5}	4
12	(Chinese Taipei) T-l Wu	7^{7}	4	6^{3}
(Netherlands) T van Rijthoven	6^{2}	6	7^{7}
(Australia) L Saville	6	6
Alt	(Japan) Ken Onishi	2	2

Third round
3	(Japan) G Soeda	0	6	7
(Japan) S Shimabukuro	6	3	5
(Netherlands) T van Rijthoven	7^{7}	7^{10}
(Australia) L Saville	6^{2}	6^{8}

Quarterfinals
3	(Japan) G Soeda	3	6	6^{6}
(Netherlands) T van Rijthoven	6	3	7^{8}

=== Bottom half ===
==== Section 3 ====
First round
(Chinese Taipei) C-h Tseng	6	6
(Brazil) B Sant'Anna	3	0
LL	(Japan) Ren Nakamura	6^{4}	0
WC	(Japan) S Hazawa	7^{7}	6
(Japan) Shintaro Imai	6	6
WC	(Japan) S Watanabe	4	2
(Japan) Renta Tokuda	6	6
Q	(Japan) Yuta Kawahashi	3	1

Second round
5	(Japan) T Ito	3	0^{r}
(Chinese Taipei) C-h Tseng	6	3
WC	(Japan) S Hazawa	6^{5}	4
11	(Japan) H Moriya	7^{7}	6
15	(South Korea) D-h Lee	4	2
(Japan) S Imai	6	6
(Japan) R Tokuda	6	6
4	(Australia) J Duckworth	2	2

Third round
(Chinese Taipei) C-h Tseng	5	2
11	(Japan) H Moriya	7	6
(Japan) S Imai	3	6	6
(Japan) R Tokuda	6	3	2

Quarterfinals
11	(Japan) H Moriya	3	6^{4}
(Japan) S Imai	6	7^{7}

==== Section 4 ====
First round
WC	(Japan) Ryota Tanuma	6	4	7^{8}
(Japan) T Niki	3	6	6^{6}
PR	(Australia) B Mousley	2	3^{r}
(Japan) Jumpei Yamasaki	6	4
(Chinese Taipei) T-h Yang	2	3
(Russia) T Gabashvili	6	6
(South Korea) Y-s Chung	7^{7}	7^{7}
(Japan) Y Takahashi	6^{3}	6^{1}

Second round
8	(United Kingdom) J Clarke	6	3	6
WC	(Japan) R Tanuma	3	6	3
(Japan) J Yamasaki	4	1
9	(India) R Ramanathan	6	6
14	(Australia) A Santillan	6	4	0^{r}
(Russia) T Gabashvili	3	6	0
(South Korea) Y-s Chung	1	4
2	(Japan) Y Sugita	6	6

Third round
8	(United Kingdom) J Clarke	3	3
9	(India) R Ramanathan	6	6
(Russia) T Gabashvili	7^{7}	3	3
2	(Japan) Y Sugita	6^{4}	6	6

Quarterfinals
9	(India) R Ramanathan	2	3
2	(Japan) Y Sugita	6	6
