= 2024 Kobe Challenger =

- Date: 11–17 November
- Edition: 8th
- Surface: Hard (indoor)
- Location: Kobe, Japan

Champions

Singles
- (Belgium) Alexander Blockx

Doubles
- (United States) Vasil Kirkov / (Netherlands) Bart Stevens
← 2023 ·	Kobe Challenger	· 2025 →

The 2024 Hyōgo Noah Challenger was a professional tennis tournament played on indoor hard courts. It was the 8th edition of the tournament which was part of the 2024 ATP Challenger Tour. It took place in Kobe, Japan between 11 and 17 November 2024.

== Singles main-draw entrants ==
=== Seeds ===
Country	Player	Rank^{1}	Seed
CHN	Bu Yunchaokete	72	1
JPN	Taro Daniel	82	2
ITA	Mattia Bellucci	105	3
USA	Nicolas Moreno de Alboran	119	4
ITA	Matteo Gigante	139	5
JPN	Yasutaka Uchiyama	140	6
FRA	Térence Atmane	157	7
HKG	Coleman Wong	159	8

- ^{1} Rankings are as of 4 November 2024.

=== Other entrants ===
The following players received wildcards into the singles main draw:

- (Japan) Ryuki Matsuda
- (Japan) Naoki Nakagawa
- (Japan) Yosuke Watanuki

The following players received entry from the qualifying draw:

- (Netherlands) Guy den Ouden
- (Japan) Hiroki Moriya
- (Japan) Rei Sakamoto
- (Thailand) Kasidit Samrej
- (Japan) Kaichi Uchida
- (Sweden) Elias Ymer

== Champions ==
=== Singles ===
- (Belgium) Alexander Blockx def. (Austria) Jurij Rodionov 6–3, 6–1.

=== Doubles ===
- (United States) Vasil Kirkov / (Netherlands) Bart Stevens def. (Japan) Kaichi Uchida / (Japan) Takeru Yuzuki 7–6^{(9–7)}, 7–5.
