= 2022 Kobe Challenger – Doubles =

Doubles
- 2022 Kobe Challenger

Final
- Champions: (Japan) Shinji Hazawa (Japan) Yuta Shimizu
- Runners-up: (Australia) Andrew Harris (Australia) John-Patrick Smith
- Score: 6–4, 6–4

Events
Singles	Doubles
- Kobe Challenger

Purav Raja and Ramkumar Ramanathan were the defending champions but only Ramanathan chose to defend his title, partnering Arjun Kadhe. Ramanathan lost in the quarterfinals to Marc Polmans and Jason Taylor.

Shinji Hazawa and Yuta Shimizu won the title after defeating Andrew Harris and John-Patrick Smith 6–4, 6–4 in the final.

== Seeds ==
1. (India) Arjun Kadhe / (India) Ramkumar Ramanathan (quarterfinals)
2. (Romania) Victor Vlad Cornea / (Czech Republic) Zdeněk Kolář (first round)
3. (Australia) Andrew Harris / (Australia) John-Patrick Smith (final)
4. (Philippines) Ruben Gonzales / (Indonesia) Christopher Rungkat (first round)

== Draw ==
Key

- Q = Qualifier
- WC = Wild card
- LL = Lucky loser
- Alt = Alternate
- ITF = ITF entry
- PR = Protected ranking
- SR = Special ranking
- SE = Special exempt
- JE = Junior exempt
- JR = Junior Accelerator Programme entrant
- CO = College Accelerator Programme entrant
- NG = Next Gen Accelerator Program entrant
- w/o = Walkover
- r = Retired
- d = Defaulted

First round
1	(India) A Kadhe (India) R Ramanathan	3	6	[10]
(Japan) S Shimabukuro (Japan) Yo Watanuki	6	3	[8]
PR	(Japan) R Noguchi (Japan) Y Sugita	2	3
(Australia) M Polmans (Australia) J Taylor	6	6
3	(Australia) A Harris (Australia) J-P Smith	6	6
Alt	(Philippines) FC Alcantara (Vietnam) NH Lý	3	2
(Australia) R Hijikata (Chinese Taipei) Y-h Hsu	3	1
(South Korea) Y-s Chung (Japan) K Uchida	6	6
(South Korea) J-s Nam (South Korea) M-k Song	6	6
(Romania) ND Ionel (Romania) FC Jianu	3	2
(Japan) T Matsui (Japan) K Uesugi	6	6
4	(Philippines) R Gonzales (Indonesia) C Rungkat	4	2
WC	(Japan) T Ichikawa (Japan) S Watanabe	6	6
(Australia) D Sweeny (Australia) L Tu	3	3
WC	(Japan) S Hazawa (Japan) Y Shimizu	6	4	[10]
2	(Romania) VV Cornea (Czech Republic) Z Kolář	4	6	[4]

Quarterfinals
1	(India) A Kadhe (India) R Ramanathan	4	4
(Australia) M Polmans (Australia) J Taylor	6	6
3	(Australia) A Harris (Australia) J-P Smith	7^{7}	3	[10]
(South Korea) Y-s Chung (Japan) K Uchida	6^{2}	6	[7]
(South Korea) J-s Nam (South Korea) M-k Song	5	3
(Japan) T Matsui (Japan) K Uesugi	7	6
WC	(Japan) T Ichikawa (Japan) S Watanabe	4	2
WC	(Japan) S Hazawa (Japan) Y Shimizu	6	6

Semifinals
(Australia) M Polmans (Australia) J Taylor	2	2
3	(Australia) A Harris (Australia) J-P Smith	6	6
(Japan) T Matsui (Japan) K Uesugi	6^{2}	2
WC	(Japan) S Hazawa (Japan) Y Shimizu	7^{7}	6

Final
3	(Australia) A Harris (Australia) J-P Smith	4	4
WC	(Japan) S Hazawa (Japan) Y Shimizu	6	6
