= 2022 Kobe Challenger =

- Date: 14–20 November
- Edition: 6th
- Surface: Hard (indoor)
- Location: Kobe, Japan

Champions

Singles
- (Japan) Yosuke Watanuki

Doubles
- (Japan) Shinji Hazawa / (Japan) Yuta Shimizu
← 2019 ·	Kobe Challenger	· 2023 →

The 2022 Hyōgo Noah Challenger was a professional tennis tournament played on indoor hard courts. It was the 6th edition of the tournament which was part of the 2022 ATP Challenger Tour. It took place in Kobe, Japan between 14 and 20 November 2022.

== Singles main-draw entrants ==
=== Seeds ===
Country	Player	Rank^{1}	Seed
AUS	Christopher O'Connell	84	1
AUS	John Millman	155	2
AUS	Rinky Hijikata	167	3
JPN	Kaichi Uchida	169	4
AUS	James Duckworth	171	5
BIH	Damir Džumhur	180	6
JPN	Yosuke Watanuki	193	7
AUS	Li Tu	196	8

- ^{1} Rankings are as of 7 November 2022.

=== Other entrants ===
The following players received wildcards into the singles main draw:

- (Japan) Shinji Hazawa
- (Japan) Taisei Ichikawa
- (Japan) Shintaro Imai

The following players received entry into the singles main draw using protected rankings:

- (Japan) Tatsuma Ito
- (Japan) Yūichi Sugita

The following players received entry from the qualifying draw:

- (South Korea) Chung Yun-seong
- (Chinese Taipei) Jason Jung
- (Japan) Shintaro Mochizuki
- (Japan) Naoki Nakagawa
- (Australia) Marc Polmans
- (Northern Mariana Islands) Colin Sinclair

== Champions ==
=== Singles ===
- (Japan) Yosuke Watanuki def. (Portugal) Frederico Ferreira Silva 6–7^{(3–7)}, 7–5, 6–4.

=== Doubles ===
- (Japan) Shinji Hazawa / (Japan) Yuta Shimizu def. (Australia) Andrew Harris / (Australia) John-Patrick Smith 6–4, 6–4.
