= 2016 Kobe Challenger – Singles =

Singles
- 2016 Kobe Challenger

Final
- Champion: (South Korea) Chung Hyeon
- Runner-up: (Australia) James Duckworth
- Score: 6–4, 7–6^{(7–2)}

Events
Singles	Doubles
← 2015 ·	Kobe Challenger	· 2017 →

John Millman was the defending champion but chose not to defend his title.

Chung Hyeon won the title after defeating James Duckworth 6–4, 7–6^{(7–2)} in the final.

== Seeds ==
1. (Japan) Yūichi Sugita (first round)
2. (Japan) Yoshihito Nishioka (quarterfinals)
3. (Japan) Taro Daniel (first round)
4. (Japan) Go Soeda (semifinals)
5. (South Korea) Chung Hyeon (champion)
6. (South Korea) Lee Duck-hee (semifinals)
7. (Australia) James Duckworth (final)
8. (Japan) Tatsuma Ito (first round)

== Draw ==
=== Key ===
- Q = Qualifier
- WC = Wild card
- LL = Lucky loser
- Alt = Alternate
- SE = Special exempt
- PR = Protected ranking
- ITF = ITF entry
- JE = Junior exempt
- w/o = Walkover
- r = Retired
- d = Defaulted
- SR = Special ranking

=== Finals ===
Semifinals
6	(South Korea) Lee Duck-hee	6^{2}	4
7	(Australia) James Duckworth	7^{7}	6
4	(Japan) Go Soeda	3	7^{7}	3
5	(South Korea) Chung Hyeon	6	6^{4}	6

Final
7	(Australia) James Duckworth	4	6^{2}
5	(South Korea) Chung Hyeon	6	7^{7}

=== Top half ===
First round
1	(Japan) Y Sugita	3	2
(Japan) Y Uchiyama	6	6
(France) A Michon	6	6
Q	(Chinese Taipei) K-y Lee	4	0
(Chinese Taipei) T Chen	4	4
WC	(Japan) Y Watanuki	6	6
Q	(South Korea) Kim Cheong-eui	1	6	3
6	(South Korea) D-h Lee	6	3	6
3	(Japan) T Daniel	1	1
(Japan) H Moriya	6	6
(India) P Gunneswaran	3	6^{0}
(France) L Lokoli	6	7^{7}
(Croatia) A Pavić	5	4
(Australia) J-P Smith	7	6
Q	(Japan) Shintaro Imai	0	7^{7}	4
7	(Australia) J Duckworth	6	6^{4}	6

Second round
(Japan) Y Uchiyama	6	6
(France) A Michon	2	3
WC	(Japan) Y Watanuki	1	2
6	(South Korea) D-h Lee	6	6
(Japan) H Moriya	3	3
(France) L Lokoli	6	6
(Australia) J-P Smith	3	2
7	(Australia) J Duckworth	6	6

Quarterfinals
(Japan) Y Uchiyama	1	0^{r}
6	(South Korea) D-h Lee	6	2
(France) L Lokoli	5	6^{2}
7	(Australia) J Duckworth	7	7^{7}

Semifinals
6	(South Korea) D-h Lee	6^{2}	4
7	(Australia) J Duckworth	7^{7}	6

=== Bottom half ===
First round
8	(Japan) T Ito	6^{3}	6	4
(Australia) L Saville	7^{7}	4	6
(Israel) A Weintraub	7	6
Q	(Japan) K Uesugi	5	4
WC	(Japan) Makoto Ochi	3	1
WC	(Japan) Ken Onishi	6	6
(Japan) Shuichi Sekiguchi	1	0
4	(Japan) G Soeda	6	6
5	(South Korea) H Chung	6	6
(South Korea) S-c Hong	1	3
(Israel) E Leshem	2	4
(Germany) D Masur	6	6
(Japan) Yuya Kibi	6	6^{4}	6
WC	(Japan) Y Takahashi	2	7^{7}	3
(South Korea) S-w Kwon	4	2
2	(Japan) Y Nishioka	6	6

Second round
(Australia) L Saville	4	6^{6}
(Israel) A Weintraub	6	7^{8}
WC	(Japan) K Onishi	0	6^{7}
4	(Japan) G Soeda	6	7^{9}
5	(South Korea) H Chung	1	7	6
(Germany) D Masur	6	5	3
(Japan) Y Kibi	1	4
2	(Japan) Y Nishioka	6	6

Quarterfinals
(Israel) A Weintraub	2	6	1
4	(Japan) G Soeda	6	1	6
5	(South Korea) H Chung	7	6
2	(Japan) Y Nishioka	5	4

Semifinals
4	(Japan) G Soeda	3	7^{7}	3
5	(South Korea) H Chung	6	6^{4}	6
