= 2025 Kobe Challenger – Singles =

Singles
- 2025 Kobe Challenger

Final
- Champion: (Japan) Yosuke Watanuki
- Runner-up: (Sweden) Elias Ymer
- Score: 3–6, 6–1, 6–4

Events
Singles	Doubles
- Kobe Challenger

Alexander Blockx was the defending champion but chose not to defend his title.

Yosuke Watanuki won the title after defeating Elias Ymer 3–6, 6–1, 6–4 in the final.

== Seeds ==
1. (Chinese Taipei) Tseng Chun-hsin (semifinals)
2. (Japan) Yoshihito Nishioka (second round, withdrew)
3. (Japan) Sho Shimabukuro (quarterfinals, retired)
4. (Japan) Yosuke Watanuki (champion)
5. (France) Hugo Grenier (quarterfinals)
6. (Japan) Rei Sakamoto (quarterfinals)
7. (Sweden) Elias Ymer (final)
8. (United Kingdom) Oliver Crawford (second round)

== Draw ==
Key

- Q = Qualifier
- WC = Wild card
- LL = Lucky loser
- Alt = Alternate
- ITF = ITF entry
- PR = Protected ranking
- SR = Special ranking
- SE = Special exempt
- JE = Junior exempt
- JR = Junior Accelerator Programme entrant
- CO = College Accelerator Programme entrant
- NG = Next Gen Accelerator Program entrant
- w/o = Walkover
- r = Retired
- d = Defaulted

=== Finals ===
Semifinals
1	(Chinese Taipei) Tseng Chun-hsin	6	2	1
4	(Japan) Yosuke Watanuki	2	6	6
(Japan) Kaichi Uchida	4	6	3
7	(Sweden) Elias Ymer	6	4	6

Final
4	(Japan) Yosuke Watanuki	3	6	6
7	(Sweden) Elias Ymer	6	1	4

=== Top half ===
First round
1	(Chinese Taipei) C-h Tseng	6	6
(Bulgaria) D Kuzmanov	4	1
(South Korea) H Chung	6	6
WC	(Japan) Ryuki Matsuda	1	4
(Czech Republic) H Bartoň	6^{8}	6	7^{8}
Q	(South Korea) J-s Nam	7^{10}	4	6^{6}
Q	(United Kingdom) M Basing	6^{6}	7^{7}	3
6	(Japan) R Sakamoto	7^{8}	6^{4}	6
4	(Japan) Y Watanuki	6	6
JR	(United States) K Bigun	4	2
Q	Maxim Zhukov	6^{1}	2
(Portugal) F Ferreira Silva	7^{7}	6
(Japan) Y Shimizu	6^{5}	4
(Chinese Taipei) Y-h Hsu	7^{7}	6
Q	(Brazil) I Marcondes	2	6^{6}
5	(France) H Grenier	6	7^{8}

Second round
1	(Chinese Taipei) C-h Tseng	1	6	7
(South Korea) H Chung	6	2	5
(Czech Republic) H Bartoň	6	3	4
6	(Japan) R Sakamoto	3	6	6
4	(Japan) Y Watanuki	6	6
(Portugal) F Ferreira Silva	4	4
(Chinese Taipei) Y-h Hsu	2	2
5	(France) H Grenier	6	6

Quarterfinals
1	(Chinese Taipei) C-h Tseng	4	6	7^{13}
6	(Japan) R Sakamoto	6	1	6^{11}
4	(Japan) Y Watanuki	7^{13}	6
5	(France) H Grenier	6^{11}	3

Semifinals
1	(Chinese Taipei) C-h Tseng	6	2	1
4	(Japan) Y Watanuki	2	6	6

=== Bottom half ===
First round
8	(United Kingdom) O Crawford	6^{1}	6	7^{9}
(Japan) Y Uchiyama	7^{7}	4	6^{7}
(Japan) K Uchida	4	6	6
Q	(Japan) Y Takahashi	6	3	4
Q	(Malaysia) Mitsuki Wei Kang Leong	6^{6}	6	1
(Thailand) M Jones	7^{8}	3	6
WC	(Japan) K Isomura	6^{1}	4
3	(Japan) S Shimabukuro	7^{7}	6
7	(Sweden) E Ymer	6	6^{4}	1
(United Kingdom) R Peniston	2	7^{7}	1^{r}
WC	(Japan) Ryotaro Taguchi	3	4
(Japan) Renta Tokuda	6	6
(United States) G Johns	3	5
(Switzerland) M-A Hüsler	6	7
PR	(Chinese Taipei) J Jung	6	3	4
2	(Japan) Y Nishioka	1	6	6

Second round
8	(United Kingdom) O Crawford	7^{12}	3	4
(Japan) K Uchida	6^{10}	6	6
(Thailand) M Jones	6	3	4
3	(Japan) S Shimabukuro	3	6	6
7	(Sweden) E Ymer	6	0
(Japan) R Tokuda	1	1^{r}
(Switzerland) M-A Hüsler	w/o
2	(Japan) Y Nishioka

Quarterfinals
(Japan) K Uchida	7^{7}	5	2
3	(Japan) S Shimabukuro	6^{3}	7	0^{r}
7	(Sweden) E Ymer	7	5	6
(Switzerland) M-A Hüsler	5	7	4

Semifinals
(Japan) K Uchida	4	6	3
7	(Sweden) E Ymer	6	4	6
