= 2015 Kobe Challenger – Doubles =

Doubles
- 2015 Kobe Challenger

Final
- Champions: (Thailand) Sanchai Ratiwatana (Thailand) Sonchat Ratiwatana
- Runners-up: (Chinese Taipei) Chen Ti (Croatia) Franko Škugor
- Score: 6–4, 2–6, [11–9]

Events
Singles	Doubles
Kobe Challenger	· 2016 →

Sanchai Ratiwatana and Sonchat Ratiwatana won the title, defeating Chen Ti and Franko Škugor in the final 6–4, 2–6, [11–9] .

== Seeds ==
1. (Thailand) Sanchai Ratiwatana / (Thailand) Sonchat Ratiwatana (champions)
2. (Chinese Taipei) Chen Ti / (Croatia) Franko Škugor (final)
3. (China) Bai Yan / (China) Li Zhe (semifinals)
4. (Chinese Taipei) Hsieh Cheng-peng / (Chinese Taipei) Yang Tsung-hua (semifinals)

== Draw ==
=== Key ===
- Q = Qualifier
- WC = Wild card
- LL = Lucky loser
- Alt = Alternate
- SE = Special exempt
- PR = Protected ranking
- ITF = ITF entry
- JE = Junior exempt
- w/o = Walkover
- r = Retired
- d = Defaulted
- SR = Special ranking

=== Draw ===
First round
1	(Thailand) Sa Ratiwatana (Thailand) So Ratiwatana	6	6
(United States) JP Fruttero (United Kingdom) B Klein	4	3
(Poland) A Kapaś (India) D Sharan	w/o
(Japan) Yuya Kibi (Japan) T Niki
3	(China) Y Bai (China) Z Li	6	7
(Italy) R Ghedin (France) S Robert	3	5
(Chinese Taipei) H-h Lee (Japan) Y Uchiyama	6	6
(Russia) K Kravchuk (Chinese Taipei) J Wang	3	2
(Chinese Taipei) J Jung (Chinese Taipei) H-y Peng	4	4
(Japan) T Daniel (Russia) A Kudryavtsev	6	6
Alt	(South Korea) D-h Lee (South Korea) Chung Hyo Woo	1	3
4	(Chinese Taipei) C-p Hsieh (Chinese Taipei) T-h Yang	6	6
WC	(Japan) Makoto Ochi (Japan) Ryota Tanuma	4	6^{5}
WC	(Japan) H Kondo (Japan) Ken Onishi	6	7^{7}
(Japan) T Matsui (Indonesia) C Rungkat	2	4
2	(Chinese Taipei) T Chen (Croatia) F Škugor	6	6

Quarterfinals
1	(Thailand) Sa Ratiwatana (Thailand) So Ratiwatana	6	6
(Poland) A Kapaś (India) D Sharan	4	3
3	(China) Y Bai (China) Z Li	6	6
(Chinese Taipei) H-h Lee (Japan) Y Uchiyama	3	4
(Japan) T Daniel (Russia) A Kudryavtsev	6	6^{4}	[5]
4	(Chinese Taipei) C-p Hsieh (Chinese Taipei) T-h Yang	4	7^{7}	[10]
(Japan) H Kondo (Japan) K Onishi	2	4
2	(Chinese Taipei) T Chen (Croatia) F Škugor	6	6

Semifinals
1	(Thailand) Sa Ratiwatana (Thailand) So Ratiwatana	2	7^{7}	[10]
3	(China) Y Bai (China) Z Li	6	6^{3}	[6]
4	(Chinese Taipei) C-p Hsieh (Chinese Taipei) T-h Yang	0	2
2	(Chinese Taipei) T Chen (Croatia) F Škugor	6	6

Final
1	(Thailand) Sa Ratiwatana (Thailand) So Ratiwatana	6	2	[11]
2	(Chinese Taipei) T Chen (Croatia) F Škugor	4	6	[9]
