= 2016 Kobe Challenger =

Tennis tournament

- Date: 7–13 November
- Edition: 2nd
- Surface: Hard (indoor)
- Location: Kobe, Japan

Champions

Singles
- (South Korea) Chung Hyeon

Doubles
- (Germany) Daniel Masur / (Croatia) Ante Pavić
← 2015 ·	Kobe Challenger	· 2017 →

The 2016 Kobe Challenger was a professional tennis tournament played on indoor hard courts. It was the 2nd edition of the tournament which was part of the 2016 ATP Challenger Tour. It took place in Kobe, Japan between 7 and 13 November 2016.

== Singles main-draw entrants ==
=== Seeds ===
Country	Player	Rank^{1}	Seed
JPN	Yūichi Sugita	90	1
JPN	Yoshihito Nishioka	97	2
JPN	Taro Daniel	100	3
JPN	Go Soeda	119	4
KOR	Chung Hyeon	127	5
KOR	Lee Duck-hee	149	6
AUS	James Duckworth	160	7
JPN	Tatsuma Ito	164	8

- ^{1} Rankings are as of October 31, 2016.

=== Other entrants ===
The following players received wildcards into the singles main draw:

- (Japan) Yosuke Watanuki
- (Japan) Makoto Ochi
- (Japan) Ken Onishi
- (Japan) Yusuke Takahashi

The following players received entry from the qualifying draw:

- (Japan) Shintaro Imai
- (South Korea) Kim Cheung-eui
- (Chinese Taipei) Lee Kuan-yi
- (Japan) Kaito Uesugi

== Champions ==
=== Singles ===
- (South Korea) Chung Hyeon def. (Australia) James Duckworth, 6–4, 7–6^{(7–2)}.

=== Doubles ===
- (Germany) Daniel Masur / (Croatia) Ante Pavić def. (India) Jeevan Nedunchezhiyan / (Indonesia) Christopher Rungkat, 4–6, 6–3, [10–6].
