= 2015 Kobe Challenger – Singles =

Singles
- 2015 Kobe Challenger

Final
- Champion: (Australia) John Millman
- Runner-up: (Japan) Taro Daniel
- Score: 6–1, 6–3

Events
Singles	Doubles
Kobe Challenger	· 2016 →

Top seed John Millman won the title, defeating Taro Daniel in the final 6–1, 6–3.

== Seeds ==
1. (Australia) John Millman (champion)
2. (Australia) Matthew Ebden (quarterfinals)
3. (Japan) Go Soeda (quarterfinals)
4. (Japan) Taro Daniel (final)
5. (Japan) Tatsuma Ito (first round)
6. (Russia) Konstantin Kravchuk (semifinals)
7. (Japan) Yoshihito Nishioka (semifinals)
8. (United Kingdom) Brydan Klein (second round)

== Draw ==
=== Key ===
- Q = Qualifier
- WC = Wild card
- LL = Lucky loser
- Alt = Alternate
- SE = Special exempt
- PR = Protected ranking
- ITF = ITF entry
- JE = Junior exempt
- w/o = Walkover
- r = Retired
- d = Defaulted
- SR = Special ranking

=== Finals ===
Semifinals
1	(Australia) John Millman	6	6
7	(Japan) Yoshihito Nishioka	0	1
4	(Japan) Taro Daniel	6	7^{7}
6	(Russia) Konstantin Kravchuk	4	6^{4}

Final
1	(Australia) John Millman	6	6
4	(Japan) Taro Daniel	1	3

=== Top half ===
First round
1	(Australia) J Millman	6	6
LL	(Japan) Masato Shiga	1	1
(South Korea) D-h Lee	6	6
WC	(Japan) Sho Katayama	3	1
Q	(Poland) A Kapaś	4	0
(China) Y Bai	6	6
(Croatia) F Škugor	2	1
8	(United Kingdom) B Klein	6	6
3	(Japan) G Soeda	6	6
Q	(South Korea) Young Seok Kim	2	4
Q	(Indonesia) C Rungkat	3	4
(Chinese Taipei) T-h Yang	6	6
LL	(Japan) Makoto Ochi	3	6^{3}
LL	(Japan) Y Ito	6	7^{7}
(Chinese Taipei) T Chen	1	2
7	(Japan) Y Nishioka	6	6

Second round
1	(Australia) J Millman	6	6
(South Korea) D-h Lee	1	4
(China) Y Bai	6	6
8	(United Kingdom) B Klein	4	4
3	(Japan) G Soeda	6	6
(Chinese Taipei) T-h Yang	2	2
LL	(Japan) Y Ito	1	0
7	(Japan) Y Nishioka	6	6

Quarterfinals
1	(Australia) J Millman	6	7^{7}
(China) Y Bai	3	6^{4}
3	(Japan) G Soeda	5	6	1
7	(Japan) Y Nishioka	7	3	6

Semifinals
1	(Australia) J Millman	6	6
7	(Japan) Y Nishioka	0	1

=== Bottom half ===
First round
5	(Japan) T Ito	5	6^{7}
(France) S Robert	7	7^{9}
(Chinese Taipei) J Wang	2	5
(Japan) Y Uchiyama	6	7
(China) Z Li	3	1
(Russia) A Kudryavtsev	6	6
WC	(Japan) Yuya Kibi	5	1
4	(Japan) T Daniel	7	6
6	(Russia) K Kravchuk	6	7
(Chinese Taipei) J Jung	3	5
(Australia) O Jasika	6	6
(Japan) H Moriya	1	0
(South Africa) T Vorster	7	6
WC	(Japan) Ken Onishi	5	4
Q	(Japan) K Takeuchi	6^{1}	6^{4}
2	(Australia) M Ebden	7^{7}	7^{7}

Second round
(France) S Robert	5	6	6
(Japan) Y Uchiyama	7	3	1
(Russia) A Kudryavtsev	3	3
4	(Japan) T Daniel	6	6
6	(Russia) K Kravchuk	6	6
(Australia) O Jasika	3	1
(South Africa) T Vorster	4	1
2	(Australia) M Ebden	6	6

Quarterfinals
(France) S Robert	6	6^{5}	2
4	(Japan) T Daniel	2	7^{7}	6
6	(Russia) K Kravchuk	6	6
2	(Australia) M Ebden	4	0

Semifinals
4	(Japan) T Daniel	6	7^{7}
6	(Russia) K Kravchuk	4	6^{4}
