= 2018 Kobe Challenger =

Tennis tournament

- Date: 12–18 November
- Edition: 4th
- Surface: Hard (indoor)
- Location: Kobe, Japan

Champions

Singles
- (Japan) Tatsuma Ito

Doubles
- (Portugal) Gonçalo Oliveira / (Australia) Akira Santillan
- Kobe Challenger

The 2018 Kobe Challenger was a professional tennis tournament played on indoor hard courts. It was the 4th edition of the tournament which was part of the 2018 ATP Challenger Tour. It took place in Kobe, Japan between 12 and 18 November 2018.

== Singles main-draw entrants ==
=== Seeds ===
Country	Player	Rank^{1}	Seed
JPN	Yoshihito Nishioka	81	1
JPN	Tatsuma Ito	165	2
JPN	Hiroki Moriya	185	3
JPN	Go Soeda	190	4
~~KOR~~	~~Lee Duck-hee~~	~~195~~	~~5~~
JPN	Yasutaka Uchiyama	217	6
JPN	Yosuke Watanuki	219	7
KOR	Kwon Soon-woo	220	8

- ^{1} Rankings are as of 5 November 2018.

=== Other entrants ===
The following players received wildcards into the singles main draw:

- (Japan) Hiroyasu Ehara
- (Japan) Shinji Hazawa
- (Japan) Shuichi Sekiguchi
- (Japan) Kaito Uesugi

The following players received entry from the qualifying draw:

- (Australia) Andrew Harris
- (Northern Mariana Islands) Colin Sinclair
- (Australia) Aleksandar Vukic
- (Chinese Taipei) Wu Tung-lin

The following player received entry as a lucky loser:

- (Vietnam) Lý Hoàng Nam

== Champions ==
=== Singles ===
- (Japan) Tatsuma Ito def. (Japan) Yosuke Watanuki 3–6, 7–5, 6–3.

=== Doubles ===
- (Portugal) Gonçalo Oliveira / (Australia) Akira Santillan def. (China) Li Zhe / (Japan) Go Soeda 2–6, 6–4, [12–10].
