= 2015 Kobe Challenger =

Tennis tournament

- Date: 9–15 November
- Edition: 1st
- Surface: Hard (indoor)
- Location: Kobe, Japan

Champions

Singles
- (Australia) John Millman

Doubles
- (Thailand) Sanchai Ratiwatana / (Thailand) Sonchat Ratiwatana
| Kobe Challenger | · 2016 → |

The 2015 Kobe Challenger was a professional tennis tournament played on indoor hard courts. It was the 1st edition of the tournament which was part of the 2015 ATP Challenger Tour. It took place in Kobe, Japan between 9 and 15 November 2015.

== Singles main-draw entrants ==
=== Seeds ===
| Country | Player | Rank^{1} | Seed |
|---|---|---|---|
| AUS | John Millman | 74 | 1 |
| AUS | Matthew Ebden | 108 | 2 |
| JPN | Go Soeda | 114 | 3 |
| JPN | Taro Daniel | 117 | 4 |
| JPN | Tatsuma Ito | 119 | 5 |
| RUS | Konstantin Kravchuk | 142 | 6 |
| JPN | Yoshihito Nishioka | 151 | 7 |
| GBR | Brydan Klein | 178 | 8 |

- ^{1} Rankings are as of November 2, 2015.

=== Other entrants ===
The following players received wildcards into the singles main draw:

- (Japan) Sho Katayama
- (Japan) Yuya Kibi
- (Japan) Ken Onishi

The following players received entry from the qualifying draw:

- (Poland) Andriej Kapaś
- (South Korea) Young Seok Kim
- (Indonesia) Christopher Rungkat
- (Japan) Kento Takeuchi

The following players entered as lucky losers:

- (Japan) Yūichi Ito
- (Japan) Makoto Ochi
- (Japan) Masato Shiga

== Champions ==
=== Singles ===
- (Australia) John Millman def. (Japan) Taro Daniel 6–1, 6–3

=== Doubles ===
- (Thailand) Sanchai Ratiwatana / (Thailand) Sonchat Ratiwatana def. (Chinese Taipei) Chen Ti / (Croatia) Franko Škugor 6–4, 2–6, [11–9]
