= 2025 Kobe Challenger =

- Date: 10–16 November
- Edition: 9th
- Surface: Hard (indoor)
- Location: Kobe, Japan

Champions

Singles
- (Japan) Yosuke Watanuki

Doubles
- (Austria) Neil Oberleitner / (Czech Republic) Michael Vrbenský
- Kobe Challenger

The 2025 Hyōgo Noah Challenger was a professional tennis tournament played on indoor hard courts. It was the 9th edition of the tournament which was part of the 2025 ATP Challenger Tour. It took place in Kobe, Japan between 10 and 16 November 2025.

== Singles main-draw entrants ==
=== Seeds ===
Country	Player	Rank^{1}	Seed
TPE	Tseng Chun-hsin	131	1
JPN	Yoshihito Nishioka	134	2
JPN	Sho Shimabukuro	157	3
JPN	Yosuke Watanuki	170	4
FRA	Hugo Grenier	179	5
JPN	Rei Sakamoto	180	6
SWE	Elias Ymer	189	7
GBR	Oliver Crawford	192	8

- ^{1} Rankings are as of 3 November 2025.

=== Other entrants ===
The following players received wildcards into the singles main draw:

- (Japan) Kokoro Isomura
- (Japan) Ryuki Matsuda
- (Japan) Ryotaro Taguchi

The following player received entry into the singles main draw using a protected ranking:

- (Chinese Taipei) Jason Jung

The following player received entry into the singles main draw through the Junior Accelerator programme:

- (United States) Kaylan Bigun

The following players received entry from the qualifying draw:

- (United Kingdom) Max Basing
- (Malaysia) Mitsuki Wei Kang Leong
- (Brazil) Igor Marcondes
- (South Korea) Nam Ji-sung
- (Japan) Yusuke Takahashi
- Maxim Zhukov

== Champions ==
=== Singles ===
- (Japan) Yosuke Watanuki def. (Sweden) Elias Ymer 3–6, 6–1, 6–4.

=== Doubles ===
- (Austria) Neil Oberleitner / (Czech Republic) Michael Vrbenský def. (Thailand) Pruchya Isaro / (India) Niki Kaliyanda Poonacha 6–7^{(1–7)}, 7–6^{(10–8)}, [10–4].
