= Andrew Harris (tennis) =

Australian tennis player

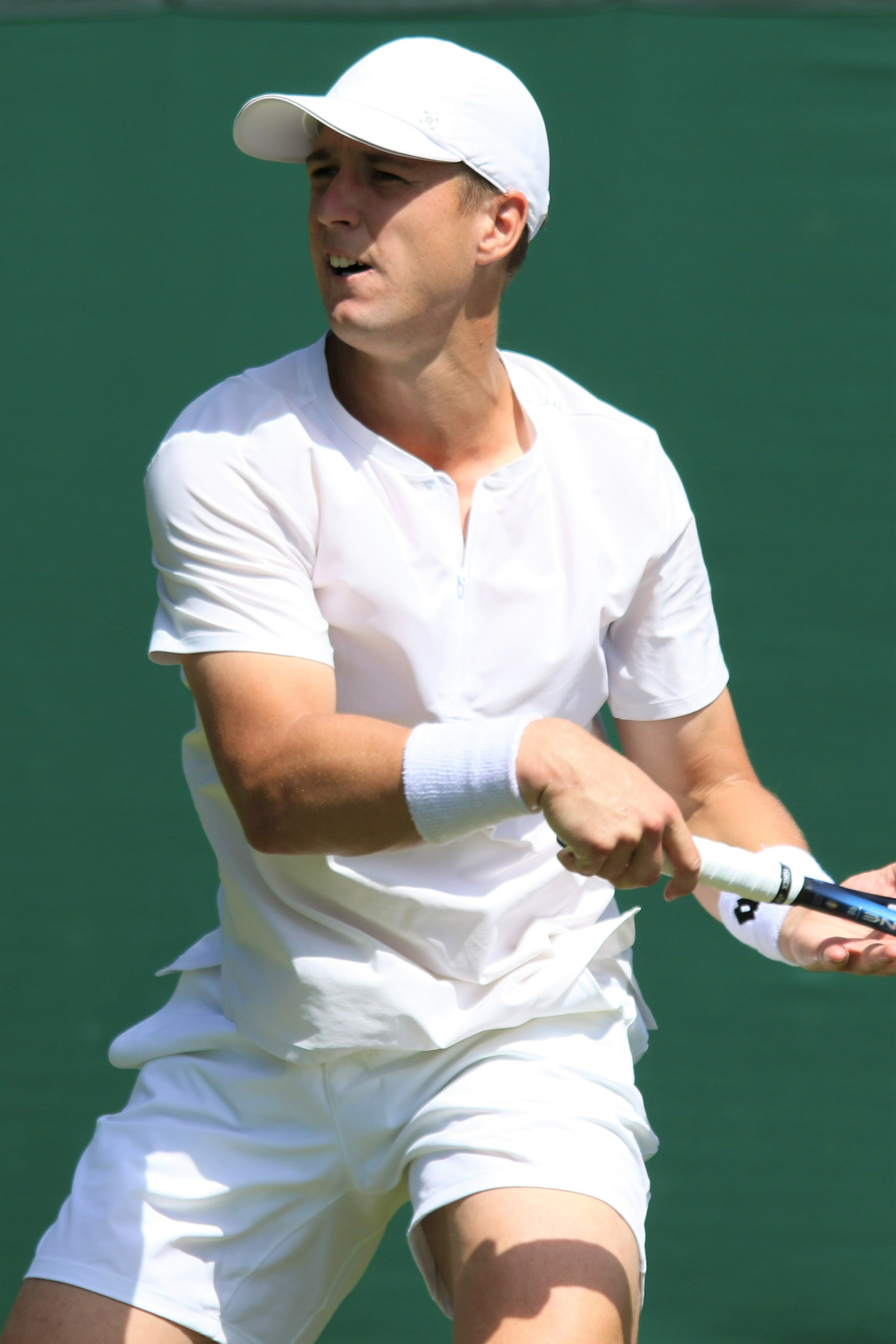
- Harris at the 2022 Wimbledon Championships
- Full name: Andrew Harris
- Country (sports): Australia
- Born: 7 March 1994 (age 32) Box Hill, New South Wales, Australia
- Height: 183 cm (6 ft 0 in)
- Turned pro: 2011
- Retired: 2024 (last match played)
- Plays: Right-handed (one-handed backhand)
- College: OU (2014–2017)
- Prize money: US $415,212

Singles
- Career record: 1–2
- Highest ranking: No. 159 (11 November 2019)

Grand Slam singles results
- Australian Open: 1R (2020)
- French Open: Q1 (2020)
- Wimbledon: Q3 (2019)
- US Open: Q1 (2019)

Doubles
- Career record: 5–14
- Highest ranking: No. 84 (30 October 2023)

Grand Slam doubles results
- Australian Open: 1R (2020, 2021, 2022, 2024)

Grand Slam mixed doubles results
- Australian Open: SF (2024)
- Last updated on: 8 April 2024.

Andrew Harris (born 7 March 1994) is an Australian tennis coach and a professional former player who was a doubles specialist in his late career. He reached career high rankings of No. 84 in doubles on 30 October 2023 and No. 159 in singles achieved on 11 November 2019. He was the winner of the junior doubles titles at the 2012 Wimbledon Championships and at Roland Garros. He attended the University of Oklahoma.

== Professional career ==
=== 2011–2012: Professional debut ===
Harris's first appearance in a professional tournament was at the Australia F7 in September 2011, where he made the quarterfinal before losing to Alex Bolt.

Harris lost in round 1 of the 2012 Australian Open qualification to Denys Molchanov, before competing in three Future tournaments in Australia. His best result being a quarterfinal in Australia F4 in March where he retired whilst playing Maverick Banes. Harris played only one more tournament in 2012, the Great Britain F10 in July, where he lost in the second round.

=== 2013 ===
He signed a National Letter of Intent with Oklahoma Sooners to participate in 2013.

Harris successfully returned to competition in May 2013, where he made the final of the Thailand F2, losing to Saketh Myneni of India. The following week, he made the semifinal of the Thailand F3, losing to fellow Australian Adam Feeney in straight sets. Throughout June and July, Harris competed in Futures throughout Europe, his best performance being a quarterfinal in Belgium F4, before winning his first title in October in Texas at the USA F27 against Dennis Nevolo.

=== 2014 ===
Harris retired from round 1 of the qualification for the 2014 Brisbane International before competing in the Men's qualifying of the 2014 Australian Open, where he made round 2. Harris didn't play again until June, where he played in 5 futures in the USA. The best result was at the F17 in Oklahoma City, where he was runner-up to Jared Donaldson.

=== 2015 ===
Harris commenced the 2015 season at the Onkaparinga Challenger, where he qualified and registered his first Challenger main draw win, defeating Hiroki Moriya 7–5, 6–1. He made it to the semi-final, before losing to Marcos Baghdatis. This increased Harris's ATP ranking 157 places to a career high of No. 497. Harris made the second round of Australian Open qualifying. This was the last match Harris played for almost 2 years.

=== 2017–2018: Return to the Tour ===
In January 2017, Harris returned to tennis gaining a wildcard into the 2017 Canberra Challenger. He defeated Thomas Fancutt in round 1, before losing to Jan-Lennard Struff in a close 3-set match. Harris did not play again until June 2017 on the ITF Futures circuit in USA. In July, he lost in qualifying rounds of two Canadian Challenger events. In September, Harris returned to Australia and won his second ITF title at Toowoomba in October.

Harris spend the 2018 year on the ITF Futures and ATP Challenger Circuits across Australia and United States of America. His best performances were semifinal results at Launceston in February, Australia F4 in March, USA F19 in July and USA F23 in August.

=== 2019: First Challenger finals, top 200 ===
In February, Harris reached his first ATP Challenger Tour final at Chennai Open Challenger. The result led to a career-high ranking. In May, Harris reached the final of Busan Challenger, further improving his ranking. In August, Harris lost in the first round of 2019 US Open – Men's singles qualifying.

=== 2020–2021: Grand Slam debut, First ATP win ===
Harris was awarded a wildcard into the 2020 Australian Open, where he lost in straight sets to eight seed Matteo Berrettini. Harris ended 2020 with a singles rank of world No. 229.

Harris commenced 2021 at the 2021 Murray River Open, where he recorded his first ATP main draw win against Taro Daniel. Harris lost in the second round of the 2021 Australian Open – Men's singles qualifying. This was the final singles tournament Harris played for the year.

=== 2022: Three Challenger doubles titles ===
Harris lost in the first round of qualifying at the 2022 Australian Open. He also lost at Wimbledon in qualifying. This was the final singles tournament Harris played in his career.

=== 2023–2024: Maiden ATP doubles final, Australian Open mixed semifinal ===
At the 2023 Los Cabos Open he reached his maiden ATP final with Dominik Koepfer.

At the 2024 Australian Open – Mixed doubles he reached the quarterfinals with partner Jaimee Fourlis upsetting top seeds Matthew Ebden and Storm Hunter en route. The Australian duo went one step further and reached the semifinals defeating fifth seeds Laura Siegemund and Sander Gillé.

He was the traveling coach for James Duckworth in 2024.

== Personal life ==
As of 2020, Harris is in a relationship with American professional tennis player Desirae Krawczyk.

== Junior Grand Slam finals ==
=== Doubles: 2 (2 titles) ===
Result	Year	Tournament	Surface	Partner	Opponents	Score
Win	2012	French Open	Clay	(Australia) Nick Kyrgios	(Czech Republic) Adam Pavlásek (Czech Republic) Václav Šafránek	6–4, 2–6, [10–7]
Win	2012	Wimbledon	Grass	(Australia) Nick Kyrgios	(Italy) Matteo Donati (Italy) Pietro Licciardi	6–2, 6–4

== ATP career finals ==
=== Doubles: 1 (1 runner-up) ===
Legend Grand Slam tournaments (0–0) ATP Tour Masters 1000 (0–0) ATP Tour 500 Series (0–0) ATP Tour 250 Series (0–1)	Finals by surface Hard (0–1) Clay (0–0) Grass (0–0)

Result	W–L	Date	Tournament	Tier	Surface	Partner	Opponents	Score
Loss	0–1	Aug 2023	Los Cabos Open, Mexico	250 Series	Hard	(Germany) Dominik Koepfer	(Mexico) Santiago González (France) Édouard Roger-Vasselin	4–6, 5–7

== Challenger and Futures/World Tennis Tour finals ==
=== Singles: 9 (2–7) ===
Legend (singles) ATP Challenger Tour (0–3) ITF Futures Tour (2–4)	Titles by surface Hard (2–7) Clay (0–0) Grass (0–0) Carpet (0–0)

Result	W–L	Date	Tournament	Tier	Surface	Opponent	Score
Loss	0–1	Jun 2013	Thailand F2, Bangkok	Futures	Hard	(India) Saketh Myneni	6–7^{(4–7)}, 1–6
Win	1–1	Oct 2013	USA F27, Mansfield	Futures	Hard	(United States) Dennis Nevolo	6–4, 7–6^{(7–5)}
Loss	1–2	Jun 2014	USA F17, Oklahoma City	Futures	Hard	(United States) Jared Donaldson	3–6, 2–6
Win	2–2	Oct 2017	Australia F6, Toowoomba	Futures	Hard	(Australia) Jason Kubler	6–4, 6–0
Loss	2–3	Nov 2017	Vietnam F3, Thủ Dầu Một City	Futures	Hard	(India) Arjun Kadhe	5–7, 3–6
Loss	2–4	Feb 2019	Chennai, India	Challenger	Hard	(France) Corentin Moutet	3–6, 3–6
Loss	2–5	May 2019	Busan, South Korea	Challenger	Hard	(Lithuania) Ričardas Berankis	6–7^{(5–7)}, 2–6
Loss	2–6	Oct 2019	Traralgon, Australia	Challenger	Hard	(Australia) Marc Polmans	5–7, 3–6
Loss	2–7	Mar 2022	M25 Bendigo, Australia	World Tennis Tour	Hard	(Australia) Li Tu	3–6, 1–6

=== Doubles: 15 (8–7) ===
Legend (doubles) ATP Challenger Tour (7–6) ITF Futures Tour (1–1)	Titles by surface Hard (7–6) Clay (1–0) Grass (0–1) Carpet (0–0)

Result	W–L	Date	Tournament	Tier	Surface	Partner	Opponents	Score
Loss	0–1	Jul 2012	Great Britain F10, Ilkley	Futures	Grass	(Australia) Andrew Whittington	(United Kingdom) Lewis Burton (United Kingdom) Edward Corrie	1–6, 1–6
Win	1–1	Oct 2019	Ningbo, China	Challenger	Hard	(Australia) Marc Polmans	(Australia) Alex Bolt (Australia) Matt Reid	6–0, 6–1
Win	2–1	May 2022	M25 Prague	World Tennis Tour	Clay	(Israel) Daniel Cukierman	(Czech Republic) Filip Duda (Germany) Peter Heller	6–0, 6–3
Win	3–1	May 2022	Little Rock, USA	Challenger	Hard	(United States) Christian Harrison	(United States) Robert Galloway (United States) Max Schnur	6–3, 6–4
Win	4–1	Jul 2022	Rome, USA	Challenger	Hard (i)	(France) Enzo Couacaud	(Philippines) Ruben Gonzales (United States) Reese Stalder	6–4, 6–2
Win	5–1	Nov 2022	Matsuyama, Japan	Challenger	Hard	(Australia) John-Patrick Smith	(Japan) Toshihide Matsui (Japan) Kaito Uesugi	6–3, 4–6, [10–8]
Loss	5–2	Nov 2022	Kobe, Japan	Challenger	Hard (i)	(Australia) John-Patrick Smith	(Japan) Shinji Hazawa (Japan) Yuta Shimizu	4–6, 4–6
Loss	5–3	Jan 2023	Canberra, Australia	Challenger	Hard	(Australia) John-Patrick Smith	(Sweden) André Göransson (Japan) Ben McLachlan	3–6, 7–5, [5–10]
Win	6–3	Feb 2023	Tenerife, Spain	Challenger	Hard	(United States) Christian Harrison	(United Kingdom) Luke Johnson (Netherlands) Sem Verbeek	7–6^{(8–6)}, 6–7^{(4–7)}, [10–8]
Loss	6–4	May 2023	Gwangju, South Korea	Challenger	Hard	(Australia) John-Patrick Smith	(United States) Evan King (United States) Reese Stalder	4–6, 2–6
Win	7–4	Jun 2023	Tyler, United States	Challenger	Hard	(Australia) Alex Bolt	(United States) Evan King (United States) Reese Stalder	6–1, 6–4
Loss	7–5	Jul 2023	Chicago, United States	Challenger	Hard	(South Korea) Chung Yun-seong	(Latvia) Mikelis Libietis (Tunisia) Skander Mansouri	6–7^{(5–7)}, 3–6
Win	8–5	Sep 2023	Cary, United States	Challenger	Hard	(Australia) Rinky Hijikata	(United States) William Blumberg (Venezuela) Luis David Martinez	6–4, 3–6, [10–6]
Loss	8–6	Oct 2023	Málaga, Spain	Challenger	Hard	(Australia) John-Patrick Smith	(United Kingdom) Julian Cash (United States) Robert Galloway	5–7, 2–6
Loss	8–7	Nov 2023	Kobe, Japan	Challenger	Hard	(South Korea) Nam Ji-sung	(United States) Evan King (United States) Reese Stalder	6–7^{(3–7)}, 6–2, [7–10]

== Performance timeline ==
Key
W	F	SF	QF	#R	RR	Q#	DNQ	A	NH

(W) winner; (F) finalist; (SF) semifinalist; (QF) quarterfinalist; (#R) rounds 4, 3, 2, 1; (RR) round-robin stage; (Q#) qualification round; (DNQ) did not qualify; (A) absent; (NH) not held; (SR) strike rate (events won / competed); (W–L) win–loss record.

=== Singles ===
Tournament	2012	2013	2014	2015	2016	2017	2018	2019	2020	2021	2022	SR	W–L	Win %
Grand Slam tournaments
Australian Open	Q1	A	Q2	Q2	A	A	A	A	1R	Q2	Q1	0 / 1	0–1	0%
French Open	A	A	A	A	A	A	A	A	Q1	A	A	0 / 0	0–0	–
Wimbledon	A	A	A	A	A	A	A	Q3	NH	A	Q1	0 / 0	0–0	–
US Open	A	A	A	A	A	A	A	Q1	A	A	A	0 / 0	0–0	–
Win–loss	0–0	0–0	0–0	0–0	0–0	0–0	0–0	0–0	0–1	0–0	0–0	0 / 1	0–1	0%
Career statistics
Year-end ranking	1151	598	654	687	–	442	343	161	229	382	681	$377,176		

=== Doubles ===
Tournament	2020	2021	2022	2023	2024	SR	W–L	Win %
Grand Slam tournaments
Australian Open	1R	1R	1R	A	1R	0 / 4	0–4	0%
French Open	A	A	A	A		0 / 0	0–0	–
Wimbledon	NH	A	A	A		0 / 0	0–0	–
US Open	A	A	A	A		0 / 0	0–0	–
Win–loss	0–1	0–1	0–1	0–0	0–1	0 / 4	0–4	0%
Career statistics
Year-end ranking	260	698	135	96	418			
