= Shinji Hazawa =

Japanese tennis player (born 1999)

- Country (sports): Japan
- Born: 12 April 1999 (age 27) Sanda, Japan
- Height: 1.75 m (5 ft 9 in)
- Plays: Right-handed (two-handed backhand)
- Prize money: US $89,875

Singles
- Career record: 0–0
- Career titles: 0
- Highest ranking: No. 501 (27 February 2023)
- Current ranking: No. 746 (9 November 2026)

Doubles
- Career record: 0–0
- Career titles: 1 Challenger, 6 Futures
- Highest ranking: No. 249 (17 April 2023)
- Current ranking: No. 412 (9 November 2026)
Medal record
Men's tennis
Representing Japan
World University Games
Bronze medal – third place	2021 Chengdu	Doubles
Bronze medal – third place	2021 Chengdu	Team
- Last updated on: 9 November 2026.

Shinji Hazawa (羽澤 慎治, Hazawa Shinji; born 12 April 1999) is a Japanese tennis player. Hazawa has a career high ATP singles ranking of No. 501 achieved on 27 February 2023 and a career high doubles ranking of No. 249 achieved on 17 April 2023.

Hazawa has won 1 ATP Challenger doubles title at the 2022 Kobe Challenger with Yuta Shimizu.

== Tour finals ==
=== Singles 2 (1–1) ===
Legend ATP Challenger (0–0) ITF Futures (1–1)	Finals by surface Hard (1–1) Clay (0–0) Grass (0–0) Carpet (0–0)

Result	W–L	Date	Tournament	Tier	Surface	Opponent	Score
Loss	0–1	Jul 2022	M15 Seremban, Malaysia	World Tennis Tour	Hard	(Japan) Daisuke Sumizawa	0–6, 2–6
Win	1–1	Jun 2023	M15 Nakhon Si Thammarat, Thailand	World Tennis Tour	Hard	(India) S D Prajwal Dev	6–3, 6–4

=== Doubles 15 (7–8) ===
Legend ATP Challenger (1–0) ITF Futures (6–8)	Finals by surface Hard (7–7) Clay (0–1) Grass (0–0) Carpet (0–0)

Result	W–L	Date	Tournament	Tier	Surface	Partner	Opponents	Score
Loss	0–1	Jan 2018	China F1, Anning	Futures	Clay	(Japan) Yuta Shimizu	(China) Te Rigele (China) Wang Aoran	5–7, 6–7^{(3–7)}
Win	1–1	Apr 2018	Japan F4, Tsukuba	Futures	Hard	(Japan) Hiroyasu Ehara	(Japan) Soichiro Moritani (Japan) Kento Takeuchi	6–4, 6–0
Loss	1–2	Apr 2018	Japan F5, Kashiwa	Futures	Hard	(Japan) Yuta Shimizu	(Japan) Renta Tokuda (Japan) Jumpei Yamasaki	6–3, 4–6, [7–10]
Win	2–2	Apr 2019	M25 Matsuyama, Japan	World Tennis Tour	Hard	(Japan) Naoki Tajima	(South Korea) Kim Cheong-eui (South Korea) Nam Ji-sung	4–6, 6–1, [10–7]
Loss	2–3	Jun 2019	M25 Yinchuan, China	World Tennis Tour	Hard	(Japan) Yuta Shimizu	(Thailand) Sanchai Ratiwatana (Thailand) Sonchat Ratiwatana	6–7^{(6–8)}, 3–6
Loss	2–4	Feb 2022	M15 Monastir, Tunisia	World Tennis Tour	Hard	(Netherlands) Ryan Nijboer	(Czech Republic) Antonín Bolardt (Czech Republic) Andrew Paulson	0–6, 5–7
Win	3–4	Feb 2022	M15 Monastir, Tunisia	World Tennis Tour	Hard	(Japan) Kaito Uesugi	(Spain) Alberto Barroso Campos (Spain) Imanol López Morillo	7–6^{(7–5)}, 6–4
Loss	3–5	Apr 2022	M15 Chiang Rai, Thailand	World Tennis Tour	Hard	(Japan) Takuto Niki	(South Korea) Nam Ji-sung (South Korea) Song Min-kyu	1–6, 4–6
Win	4–5	Apr 2022	M15 Chiang Rai, Thailand	World Tennis Tour	Hard	(Japan) Yuta Shimizu	(Thailand) Pruchya Isaro (Thailand) Thantub Suksumrarn	7–6^{(7–2)}, 6–1
Win	5–5	May 2022	M15 Heraklion, Greece	World Tennis Tour	Hard	(Japan) Shuichi Sekiguchi	(Bulgaria) Simon Anthony Ivanov (Hong Kong) Wong Hong-kit	6–4, 4–6, [12–10]
Loss	5–6	Jul 2022	M15 Kuala Lumpur, Malaysia	World Tennis Tour	Hard	(Japan) Kento Takeuchi	(Japan) Yuta Shimizu (Japan) Ryota Tanuma	6–7^{(4–7)}, 2–6
Win	6–6	Nov 2022	Kobe, Japan	Challenger	Hard (indoor)	(Japan) Yuta Shimizu	(Australia) Andrew Harris (Australia) John-Patrick Smith	6–4, 6–4
Loss	6–7	Apr 2023	M25 Tsukuba, Japan	World Tennis Tour	Hard	(Japan) Hikaru Shiraishi	(Chinese Taipei) Hsu Yu Hsiou (Chinese Taipei) Huang Tsung-hao	6–7^{(6–8)}, 6–3, [5–10]
Loss	6–8	Jun 2023	M15 Nakhon Si Thammarat, Thailand	World Tennis Tour	Hard	(Japan) Ryoatro Taguchi	(Thailand) Yuttana Charoenphon (Thailand) Kasidit Samrej	7–6^{(10–8)}, 6–7^{(6–8)}, [5–10]
Win	7–8	Jun 2023	M15 Nakhon Si Thammarat, Thailand	World Tennis Tour	Hard	(Japan) Ryoatro Taguchi	(Australia) Blake Bayldon (Australia) Blake Ellis	6–4, 7–5
