= Taisei Ichikawa =

Japanese tennis player (born 2000)

- Native name: 市川泰誠
- Country (sports): Japan
- Born: 21 December 2000 (age 25) Osaka, Japan
- Height: 1.80 m (5 ft 11 in)
- Plays: Left-handed (two-handed backhand)
- Prize money: US $94,779

Singles
- Career record: 0–0 (at ATP Tour level, Grand Slam level, and in Davis Cup)
- Career titles: 0
- Highest ranking: No. 636 (27 January 2025)
- Current ranking: No. 746 (19 October 2026)

Doubles
- Career record: 0–1 (at ATP Tour level, Grand Slam level, and in Davis Cup)
- Career titles: 1 ATP Challenger, 3 ITF
- Highest ranking: No. 265 (2 March 2026)
- Current ranking: No. 271 (19 October 2026)
- Last updated on: 19 October 2026.

Taisei Ichikawa (市川泰誠, born 21 December 2000) is a Japanese tennis player. He has a career high ATP singles ranking of world No. 636 achieved on 27 January 2025 and a career high ATP doubles ranking of No. 265 achieved on 2 March 2026.

Ichikawa made his ATP main draw debut at the 2023 Japan Open Tennis Championships after qualifying for the doubles main draw with Masamichi Imamura. Again teaming up with Imamura, he won his first ATP Challenger doubles title at the 2026 President's Cup, defeating Petr Bar Biryukov and Grigoriy Lomakin in the final.

== ATP Challenger and ITF Futures/World Tennis Tour Finals ==
=== Singles: 3 (3 runner-ups) ===
Legend (singles) ATP Challenger Tour (0–0) ITF Futures/World Tennis Tour (0–3)	Titles by surface Hard (0–3) Clay (0–0) Grass (0–0) Carpet (0–0)

Result	W–L	Date	Tournament	Tier	Surface	Opponent	Score
Loss	0–1	Dec 2023	M15 Yanagawa, Japan	World Tennis Tour	Hard	(Japan) Hikaru Shiraishi	3–6, 6–2, 1–6
Loss	0–2	Aug 2024	M25 Nakhon Si Thammarat, Thailand	World Tennis Tour	Hard	(Sweden) Leo Borg	4–6, 7–6^{(8–6)}, 3–6
Loss	0–3	May 2026	M15 Wuning, China	World Tennis Tour	Hard	(South Korea) Park Ui-sung	2–6, 3–6
