= Yuta Shimizu =

Japanese tennis player (born 1999)

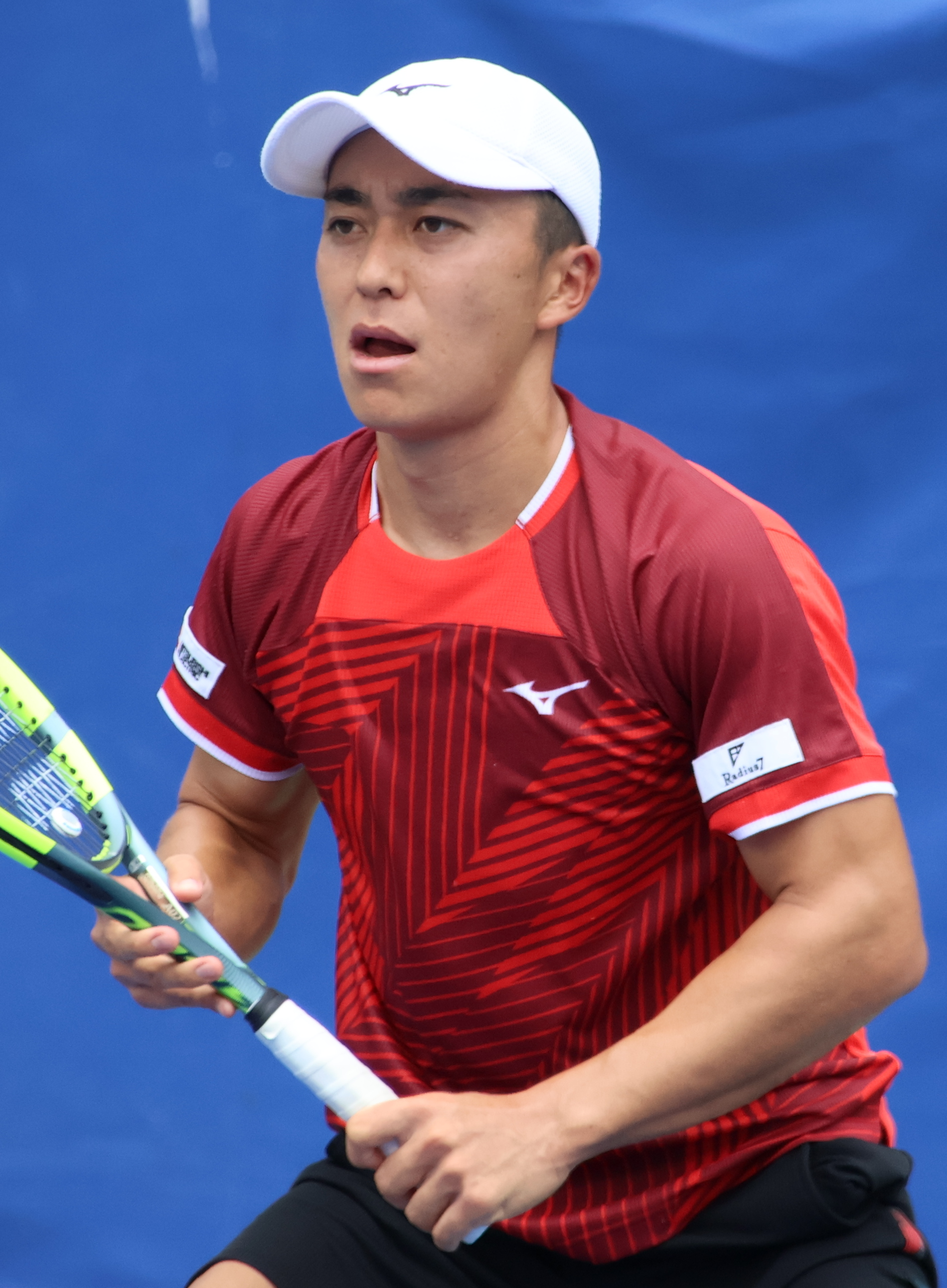
- Shimizu in 2026
- Country (sports): Japan
- Born: 9 June 1999 (age 27) Konan, Shiga, Japan
- Height: 1.63 m (5 ft 4 in)
- Plays: Left-handed (two-handed backhand)
- Prize money: US $524,404

Singles
- Career record: 1–1 (at ATP Tour level, Grand Slam level, and in Davis Cup)
- Career titles: 1 Challenger
- Highest ranking: No. 180 (24 February 2025)
- Current ranking: No. 383 (20 July 2026)

Grand Slam singles results
- Australian Open: Q1 (2024, 2025)
- French Open: Q1 (2025)
- Wimbledon: Q1 (2025)
- US Open: Q3 (2025)

Doubles
- Career record: 0–0 (at ATP Tour level, Grand Slam level, and in Davis Cup)
- Career titles: 0
- Highest ranking: No. 143 (12 June 2023)
- Current ranking: No. 243 (20 July 2026)
- Last updated on: 20 July 2026.

Yuta Shimizu (清水悠太, Shimizu Yūta; born 9 June 1999) is a Japanese professional tennis player. He has a career high ATP singles ranking of world No. 180 achieved on 24 February 2025. He also has a career high ATP doubles ranking of No. 143 achieved on 12 June 2023. Shimizu represents Japan at the Davis Cup, where he has a balancing record of 1–0.

== Career ==
Shimizu won his first ATP Challenger Tour title at the 2024 Keio Challenger, defeating Li Tu in the final.

== ATP Challenger Tour finals ==
=== Singles: 6 (1 title, 5 runner-ups) ===
Legend ATP Challenger Tour (1–5)

Result	W–L	Date	Tournament	Tier	Surface	Opponent	Score
Loss	0–1	Mar 2023	Puerto Vallarta, Mexico	Challenger	Hard	(France) Benoît Paire	6–3, 0–6, 2–6
Loss	0–2	Jul 2023	Chicago, USA	Challenger	Hard	(United States) Alex Michelsen	5–7, 2–6
Loss	0–3	Nov 2023	Yokohama, Japan	Challenger	Hard	(Japan) Yosuke Watanuki	6–7^{(5–7)}, 4–6
Loss	0–4	May 2024	Little Rock, USA	Challenger	Hard	(United States) Mitchell Krueger	3–6, 4–6
Loss	0–5	Oct 2024	City of Playford, Australia	Challenger	Hard	(Australia) Rinky Hijikata	4–6, 6–7^{(4–7)}
Win	1–5	Nov 2024	Yokohama, Japan	Challenger	Hard	(Australia) Li Tu	6–7^{(4–7)}, 6–4, 6–2

=== Doubles: 16 (7 titles, 9 runner-ups) ===
Legend ATP Challenger Tour (7–9)	Finals by surface Hard (7–9) Clay (0–0) Grass (0–0) Carpet (0–0)

Result	W–L	Date	Tournament	Tier	Surface	Partner	Opponents	Score
Win	1–0	Aug 2022	Nonthaburi II, Thailand	Challenger	Hard	(Zimbabwe) Benjamin Lock	(Philippines) Francis Alcantara (Indonesia) Christopher Rungkat	6–1, 6–3
Loss	1–1	Nov 2022	Sydney, Australia	Challenger	Hard	(New Zealand) Ajeet Rai	(Australia) Blake Ellis (Australia) Tristan Schoolkate	6–4, 5–7, [9–11]
Win	2–1	Nov 2022	Kobe, Japan	Challenger	Hard (i)	(Japan) Shinji Hazawa	(Australia) Andrew Harris (Australia) John-Patrick Smith	6–4, 6–4
Win	3–1	Nov 2022	Yokkaichi, Japan	Challenger	Hard	(Chinese Taipei) Hsu Yu-hsiou	(Japan) Masamichi Imamura (Japan) Rio Noguchi	7–6^{(7–2)}, 6–4
Loss	3–2	Apr 2023	Seoul, South Korea	Challenger	Hard	(South Korea) Chung Yun-seong	(Australia) Max Purcell (Japan) Yasutaka Uchiyama	1–6, 4–6
Win	4–2	Feb 2024	Burnie II, Australia	Challenger	Hard	(Zimbabwe) Benjamin Lock	(Australia) Blake Bayldon (Australia) Kody Pearson	6–4, 7–6^{(7–4)}
Win	5–2	Apr 2024	Shenzhen, China	Challenger	Hard	(Japan) James Trotter	(China) Wang Aoran (China) Zhou Yi	7–6^{(7–5)}, 7–6^{(7–4)}
Loss	5–3	Jul 2024	Winnipeg, Canada	Challenger	Hard	(Japan) Kaichi Uchida	(United States) Christian Harrison (United States) Cannon Kingsley	1–6, 4–6
Loss	5–4	Jul 2024	Lexington, USA	Challenger	Hard	(Japan) James Trotter	(Sweden) André Göransson (Netherlands) Sem Verbeek	4–6, 3–6
Win	6–4	Aug 2024	Jinan, China	Challenger	Hard	(South Korea) Chung Yun-seong	(Japan) Rio Noguchi (Australia) Edward Winter	6–3, 6–7^{(5–7)}, [10–6]
Loss	6–5	Oct 2024	Hangzhou, China	Challenger	Hard	(Australia) Thomas Fancutt	(China) Sun Fajing (China) Te Rigele	3–6, 5–7
Win	7–5	Apr 2025	Busan, South Korea	Challenger	Hard	(Japan) Rio Noguchi	(Chinese Taipei) Ray Ho (Australia) Matthew Romios	7–6^{(9–7)}, 6–4
Loss	7–6	Jul 2025	Granby, Canada	Challenger	Hard	(Australia) Kody Pearson	(Australia) Finn Reynolds (Australia) James Watt	3–6, 4–6
Loss	7–7	Mar 2026	Miyazaki, Japan	Challenger	Hard	(Japan) James Trotter	(South Korea) Nam Ji-sung (Finland) Patrik Niklas-Salminen	5–7, 3–6
Loss	7–8	Sep 2026	Phan Thiết, Vietnam	Challenger	Hard	(Australia) Joshua Charlton	(France) Constantin Bittoun Kouzmine (India) S D Prajwal Dev	4–6, 6–7^{(1–7)}
Loss	7–9	Nov 2026	Matsuyama, Japan	Challenger	Hard	(Thailand) Pruchya Isaro	(New Zealand) Finn Reynolds (New Zealand) James Watt	3–6, 3–6

== ITF Futures/World Tennis Tour finals ==
=== Singles: 16 (12 titles, 4 runner-ups) ===
Legend ITF Futures/WTT (12–4)	Finals by surface Hard (10–3) Clay (2–1) Grass (0–0) Carpet (0–0)

Result	W–L	Date	Tournament	Tier	Surface	Opponent	Score
Win	1–0	Jan 2018	China F1, Anning	Futures	Clay	(China) Wang Huixin	6–7^{(7–9)}, 6–1, 6–2
Win	2–0	Jun 2018	Guam F1, Tumon	Futures	Hard	(Japan) Yuichi Ito	6–3, 6–2
Loss	2–1	Aug 2018	Austria F6, Innsbruck	Futures	Clay	(Italy) Alessandro Petrone	6–2, 1–6, 4–6
Win	3–1	Sep 2018	Australia F6, Darwin	Futures	Hard	(United Kingdom) Evan Hoyt	7–6^{(8–6)}, 3–6, 6–4
Win	4–1	Jun 2019	M15 Gimcheon, South Korea	WTT	Hard	(France) Jean Thirouin	6–2, 6–0
Loss	4–2	Jun 2019	M15 Gimcheon, South Korea	WTT	Hard	(South Korea) Seong Chan Hong	1–6, 7–5, 2–6
Win	5–2	Jun 2019	M25 Yinchuan, China	WTT	Hard	(China) Bai Yan	4–6, 3–3 ret.
Win	6–2	Jul 2019	M25 Nonthaburi, Thailand	WTT	Hard	(Ukraine) Vladyslav Orlov	6–4, 6–0
Win	7–2	Jan 2020	M15 Hong Kong	WTT	Hard	(Chinese Taipei) Hsu Yu-hsiou	5–7, 7–6^{(9–7)}, 7–6^{(7–5)}
Win	8–2	Feb 2020	M25 Aktobe, Kazakhstan	WTT	Hard	(Finland) Otto Virtanen	6–4, 5–7, 6–3
Loss	8–3	May 2021	M15 Heraklion, Greece	WTT	Hard	(United Kingdom) Ryan Peniston	3–6, 0–6
Win	9–3	May 2022	M15 Antalya, Turkey	WTT	Clay	(Spain) Pablo Llamas Ruiz	2–6, 6–4, 6–3
Loss	9–4	Jul 2022	M15 Kuala Lumpur, Malaysia	WTT	Hard	(Vietnam) Lý Hoàng Nam	5–7, 3–6
Win	10–4	Aug 2022	M15 Kuching, Malaysia	WTT	Hard	(Vietnam) Lý Hoàng Nam	6–1, 6–2
Win	11–4	Aug 2022	M15 Jakarta, Indonesia	WTT	Hard	(Japan) Ryota Tanuma	6–2, 7–5
Win	12–4	Feb 2023	M25 Burnie, Australia	WTT	Hard	(Australia) Alex Bolt	6–4, 6–4

=== Doubles: 17 (7 titles, 10 runner-ups) ===
Legend ITF Futures/WTT (7–10)	Finals by surface Hard (7–6) Clay (0–3) Grass (0–0) Carpet (0–1)

Result	W–L	Date	Tournament	Tier	Surface	Partner	Opponents	Score
Loss	0–1	Jun 2017	Japan F8, Akishima	Futures	Carpet	(Japan) Rio Noguchi	(Japan) Yuto Sakai (Japan) Yunosuke Tanaka	3–6, 2–6
Loss	0–2	Jan 2018	China F1, Annning	Futures	Clay	(Japan) Shinji Hazawa	(China) Te Rigele (China) Wang Aoran	5–7, 6–7^{(3–7)}
Loss	0–3	Apr 2018	Japan F5, Kashiwa	Futures	Hard	(Japan) Shinji Hazawa	(Japan) Renta Tokuda (Japan) Jumpei Yamasaki	6–3, 4–6, [7–10]
Win	1–3	May 2018	China F4, Wuhan	Futures	Hard	(China) Te Rigele	(China) Ruikai Wang (China) Sun Fajing	7–6^{(8–6)}, 6–3
Loss	1–4	May 2018	China F5, Wuhan	Futures	Hard	(Japan) Shintaro Imai	(Finland) Harri Heliövaara (Finland) Patrik Niklas-Salminen	1–6, 7–6^{(7–5)}, [4–10]
Loss	1–5	Jun 2018	Singapore F3, Singapore	Futures	Hard	(Chinese Taipei) Hsu Yu-hsiou	(Australia) James Frawley (Australia) Jeremy Beale	2–6, 3–6
Win	2–5	Jul 2018	Hong Kong F2, Hong Kong (S.A.R)	Futures	Hard	(Japan) Kaito Uesugi	(Thailand) Congsup Congcar (Japan) Issei Okamura	7–5, 6–0
Loss	2–6	Aug 2018	Austria F5, Vogau	Futures	Clay	(Japan) Takuto Niki	(Argentina) Alejo Vilaro (Argentina) Matias Zukas	3–6, 6–3, [4–10]
Win	3–6	Jun 2019	M25 Hong Kong	WTT	Hard	(Japan) Shintaro Imai	(Australia) Blake Ellis (Vietnam) Lý Hoàng Nam	6–4, 6–4
Loss	3–7	Jun 2019	M25 Yinchuan, China	WTT	Hard	(Japan) Shinji Hazawa	(Thailand) Sonchat Ratiwatana (Thailand) Sanchai Ratiwatana	6–7^{(6–8)}, 3–6
Win	4–7	Aug 2019	M25 Nonthaburi, Thailand	WTT	Hard	(Chinese Taipei) Hsu Yu-hsiou	(Uzbekistan) Sergey Fomin (Uzbekistan) Sanjar Fayziev	6–2, 6–3
Loss	4–8	Apr 2021	M15 Sharm El Sheikh, Egypt	WTT	Hard	(Japan) Makoto Ochi	(Netherlands) Ryan Nijboer (Austria) Neil Oberleitner	6–4, 6–7^{(4–7)}, [6–10]
Win	5–8	Sep 2021	M25 Jonköping, Sweden	WTT	Hard	(Uzbekistan) Khumoyun Sultanov	(Poland) Michal Dembek (Germany) Marvin Möller	6–4, 4–6, [10–6]
Win	6–8	Oct 2021	M25 Falun, Sweden	WTT	Hard	(Uzbekistan) Khumoyun Sultanov	(Australia) Blake Ellis (Japan) Renta Tokuda	6–3, 3–6, [11–9]
Loss	6–9	Mar 2022	M25 Faro, Portugal	WTT	Hard	(Japan) Makoto Ochi	(Germany) Kai Wehnelt (Austria) Maximilian Neuchrist	4–6, 4–6
Win	7–9	May 2022	M15 Antalya, Turkey	WTT	Hard	(Japan) Shinji Hazawa	(Thailand) Pruchya Isaro (Thailand) Thantub Suksumrarn	7–6^{(7–2)}, 6–1
Loss	7–10	May 2022	M15 Chiang Rai, Thailand	WTT	Clay	(Japan) Naoki Tajima	(Spain) Juan Pablo Cañas García (Spain) Pablo Llamas Ruiz	4–6, 5–7

== Junior Grand Slam finals ==
=== Doubles: 1 (1 runner-up) ===
Result	Year	Tournament	Surface	Partner	Opponents	Score
Loss	2017	US Open	Hard	(Japan) Toru Horie	(Chinese Taipei) Hsu Yu-hsiou (China) Wu Yibing	4–6, 7–5, [9–11]
