= Yosuke Watanuki =

Japanese tennis player (born 1998)

Yosuke Watanuki 綿貫 陽介
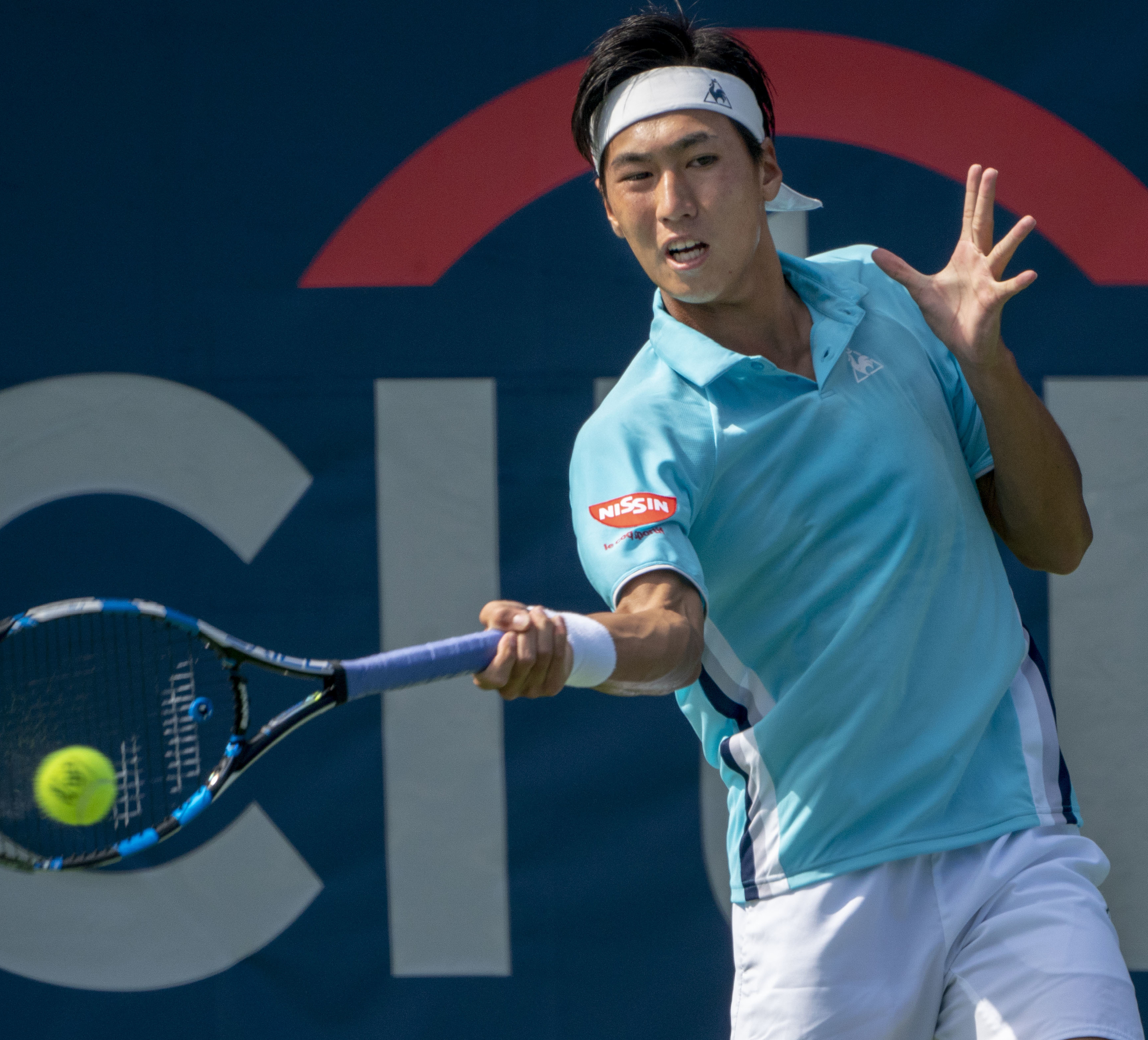
- Watanuki in 2018
- Country (sports): Japan
- Residence: Saitama, Japan
- Born: 12 April 1998 (age 28) Saitama, Japan
- Height: 1.80 m (5 ft 11 in)
- Turned pro: January 2016
- Plays: Right-handed (two handed-backhand)
- Coach: Keisuke Watanuki
- Prize money: $ 1,289,536

Singles
- Career record: 21–25
- Career titles: 0
- Highest ranking: No. 72 (30 October 2023)
- Current ranking: No. 242 (20 April 2026)

Grand Slam singles results
- Australian Open: 2R (2023)
- French Open: Q2 (2023)
- Wimbledon: 2R (2023)
- US Open: 1R (2023)

Doubles
- Career record: 3–5
- Career titles: 0
- Highest ranking: No. 374 (7 January 2019)
- Current ranking: No. 906 (20 October 2025)
Medal record
Men's tennis
Representing Japan
Asian Games
Silver medal – second place	2022 Hangzhou	Singles
Bronze medal – third place	2018 Jakarta-Palembang	Doubles
- Last updated on: 20 April 2026.

Yosuke Watanuki (綿貫 陽介, Watanuki Yōsuke; born 12 April 1998) is a Japanese professional tennis player. He has a career-high ATP ranking of World No. 72 achieved on 30 October 2023 and a doubles ranking of No. 374 achieved on 7 January 2019.

== Career ==
=== 2016: Junior No. 2 ===
On the junior tour, Watanuki has a career high combined ranking of No. 2 achieved on 21 March 2016. Watanuki was the winner of the 2016 Campeonato Internacional Juvenil de Tenis de Porto Alegre, a Grade A event in Porto Alegre, Brazil.

=== 2018–19: ATP & ATP 500 debuts & first win, Maiden Challenger title ===
He made his ATP and ATP 500 debut at the 2018 Citi Open after qualifying.

Watanuki first main draw match victory on the ATP Tour came at the 2018 Rakuten Japan Open over Robin Haase as a qualifier.

He won his maiden title at the 2019 Kobe Challenger.

=== 2021–22: ATP quarterfinal, Two Challenger titles, Top 150 ===
Watanuki entered the 2021 Winston-Salem Open as a lucky loser and won his first match against Jaume Munar. He lost to Márton Fucsovics in the second round.

He reached the quarterfinals of an ATP tournament for the first time in his career, winning his first two matches in a row at this level, as a lucky loser at the 2022 ATP Lyon Open. First he defeated eight seed Pedro Martínez for his second top-50 win. Next he defeated Kwon Soon-woo to set up a quarterfinal with Alex de Minaur. As a result, he returned to the top 225 in the rankings climbing 40 positions in the rankings at world No. 223 on 23 May 2022.

He qualified for his third ATP 500 at the 2022 Citi Open in Washington, D.C., and second time at this tournament, but lost to Kyle Edmund who was playing his first singles match after his comeback.

In November he won two back-to-back titles in Japan at the Hyōgo Noah Challenger in Kobe and in Yokkaichi defeating Frederico Ferreira Silva in both and moved into the top 150 at world No. 145 on 28 November 2022.

=== 2023–25: Major & top 75 debuts, comeback, Masters fourth round ===
In January, Watanuki qualified for the 2023 Australian Open to make his Grand Slam debut. He beat Arthur Rinderknech in the first round in straight sets for his first Major win before losing to Sebastian Korda.

Watanuki qualified for his first Masters 1000 2023 Miami Open and won his first round match against fellow qualifier Benoît Paire but lost to 12th seed Frances Tiafoe. As a result, he moved to a new career high ranking of No. 107 on 3 April 2023. Ranked No. 117, he also qualified for his second Masters at the 2023 Mutua Madrid Open and defeated Corentin Moutet in the first round before losing to world No. 13 and 11th seed Cameron Norrie.

At the 2023 BOSS Open he qualified and won his first round match against wildcard Feliciano López. He entered the main draw at the 2023 Wimbledon Championships as a lucky loser for the first time at this Major and defeated Marc-Andrea Hüsler in a five set match for his second Major win. As a result, two weeks later, he reached the top 100 at world No. 99 on 31 July 2023.

At the 2023 Rolex Shanghai Masters he defeated wildcard Shang Juncheng to reach the second round for the third time at a Masters level in the season. As a result, he rose into the top 75 in the rankings on 16 October 2024. He received a wildcard for the main draw at the ATP 500 2023 Japan Open in Tokyo. He finished the 2023 season ranked inside the top 100 at world No. 99.

In September 2024, ranked No. 338 he again received a wildcard in Tokyo, this time for the qualifying competition. In October, ranked No. 336 Watanuki entered the qualifying rounds of the Shanghai Masters, using a protected ranking, and qualified for the main draw after beating Otto Virtanen and Hong Seong-chan. In the main draw, he upset Pavel Kotov for his first main draw win in a year, and 32nd seed Brandon Nakashima to reach the third round before losing to Taylor Fritz. As a result, he returned to the top 300 of the singles rankings on 14 October 2024 at world No. 274.

Ranked No. 349, using again protected ranking in the qualifying competition, Watanuki qualified for the main draw and reached the fourth round of a Masters 1000 for the first time in his career at the 2025 BNP Paribas Open with wins over Alexander Bublik, his first ATP tour-level win since the Shanghai Masters in 2024, 19th seed Tomáš Macháč after his retirement, and 16th seed Frances Tiafoe and again moved more than a 125 positions back up to the top 225 at world No. 214 on 17 March 2025. In November Watanuki won his third title at the Hyōgo Noah Challenger in Kobe.

== Personal life ==
Watanuki has two brothers, Yusuke and Keisuke, who are both also professional tennis players. Yusuke coached Yosuke previously, Keisuke is currently his coach.

== Performance timeline ==
Key
W	F	SF	QF	#R	RR	Q#	DNQ	A	NH

(W) winner; (F) finalist; (SF) semifinalist; (QF) quarterfinalist; (#R) rounds 4, 3, 2, 1; (RR) round-robin stage; (Q#) qualification round; (DNQ) did not qualify; (A) absent; (NH) not held; (SR) strike rate (events won / competed); (W–L) win–loss record.
To avoid confusion and double counting, these charts are updated at the conclusion of a tournament or when the player's participation has ended.

=== Singles ===
Tournament	2018	2019	2020	2021	2022	2023	2024	2025	2026	SR	W–L	Win %
Grand Slam tournaments
Australian Open	A	Q3	A	A	Q2	2R	1R	Q2	Q1	0 / 2	1–2	33%
French Open	A	Q1	Q1	A	A	Q2	A	A		0 / 0	0–0	–
Wimbledon	Q1	Q3	NH	A	A	2R	A	Q3		0 / 1	1–1	50%
US Open	A	Q2	A	A	A	1R	A	Q1		0 / 1	0–1	0%
Win–loss	0–0	0–0	0–0	0–0	0–0	2–3	0–1	0–0	0–0	0 / 4	2–4	33%
ATP Masters 1000
Indian Wells Masters	A	A	NH	A	A	Q1	A	4R		0 / 1	3–1	75%
Miami Open	A	A	NH	A	A	2R	A	Q1		0 / 1	1–1	50%
Monte Carlo Masters	A	A	NH	A	A	A	A	A		0 / 0	0–0	–
Madrid Open	A	A	NH	A	A	2R	A	A		0 / 1	1–1	50%
Italian Open	A	A	A	A	A	A	A	A		0 / 0	0–0	–
Canadian Open	A	A	NH	A	A	A	A	2R		0 / 1	1–1	50%
Cincinnati Masters	A	A	A	A	A	A	A	Q1		0 / 0	0–0	–
Shanghai Masters	A	A	NH			2R	3R	Q2		0 / 2	3–2	60%
Paris Masters	A	A	A	A	A	Q1	A	A		0 / 0	0–0	–
Win–loss	0–0	0–0	0–0	0–0	0–0	3–3	2–1	4–2	0–0	0 / 6	9–6	60%

== ATP Challenger and ITF Tour Finals ==
=== Singles: 16 (11–5) ===
Legend (singles) ATP Challenger Tour (6–4) ITF Futures Tour (5–1)	Titles by surface Hard (11–5) Clay (0–0)

Result	W–L	Date	Tournament	Tier	Surface	Opponent	Score
Win	1–0	Apr 2016	Japan F4, Tsukuba	Futures	Hard	(Japan) Shintaro Imai	1–6, 6–4, 6–2
Win	2–0	Apr 2016	Japan F5, Kashiwa	Futures	Hard	(Japan) Makoto Ochi	6–3, 6–3
Win	3–0	Jun 2017	Japan F7, Tokyo	Futures	Hard	(Japan) Kento Takeuchi	4–6, 6–1, 6–4
Loss	3–1	Jun 2017	Chinese Taipei F1, Taipei	Futures	Hard	(United States) Daniel Nguyen	6–7^{(8–10)}, 1–6
Win	4–1	Jun 2017	Chinese Taipei F2, Taipei	Futures	Hard	(Japan) Yusuke Takahashi	6–2, 6–3
Win	5–1	Apr 2018	Japan F4, Tsukuba	Futures	Hard	(Japan) Renta Tokuda	7–5, 6–1
Loss	5–2	Nov 2018	Kobe, Japan	Challenger	Hard (i)	(Japan) Tatsuma Ito	6–3, 5–7, 3–6
Win	6–2	Nov 2019	Kobe, Japan	Challenger	Hard (i)	(Japan) Yūichi Sugita	6–2, 6–4
Loss	6–3	Feb 2020	Cleveland, USA	Challenger	Hard (i)	(Denmark) Mikael Torpegaard	3–6, 6–1, 1–6
Loss	6–4	Oct 2022	Yokohama, Japan	Challenger	Hard	(Australia) Christopher O'Connell	1–6, 7–6^{(7–5)}, 3–6
Win	7–4	Nov 2022	Kobe, Japan (2)	Challenger	Hard (i)	(Portugal) Frederico Ferreira Silva	6–7^{(3–7)}, 7–5, 6–4
Win	8–4	Nov 2022	Yokkaichi, Japan	Challenger	Hard	(Portugal) Frederico Ferreira Silva	6–2, 6–2
Loss	8–5	Sep 2023	Shanghai, China	Challenger	Hard	(Australia) Christopher O'Connell	3–6, 5–7
Win	9–5	Nov 2023	Yokohama, Japan	Challenger	Hard	(Japan) Yuta Shimizu	7–6^{(7–5)}, 6–4
Win	10–5	Nov 2025	Kobe, Japan (3)	Challenger	Hard (i)	(Sweden) Elias Ymer	3–6, 6–1, 6–4
Win	11–5	Nov 2026	Taipei City, Taiwan	Challenger	Hard (i)	(Czech Republic) Jan Kumstát	7–6^{(7–2)}, 7–5

== Other significant finals ==
=== Asian Games ===
==== Singles: 1 (1 silver medal) ====
Result	Year	Tournament	Surface	Opponent	Score
Silver	2022	Asian Games	Hard	(China) Zhang Zhizhen	4–6, 6–7^{(7–9)}
