= Kobe Challenger =

Tennis tournament

ATP Challenger Tour
- Event name: Hyogo Noah Challenger
- Location: Miki, Hyōgo, Japan
- Venue: Miki Disaster Management Park
- Category: ATP Challenger Tour
- Surface: Hard (indoor)
- Draw: 32S/32Q/16D
- Prize money: $100,000 (2025), €50,000
- Website: Website

The Hyōgo Noah Challenger is a tennis tournament held near Kobe, Japan in Miki at the Beans Dome in Miki Disaster Management Park, since 2015. The event is part of the ATP Challenger Tour and is played on indoor hardcourts. Yosuke Watanuki is the singles title leader having won the event four times.

== Past finals ==
=== Singles ===
Year	Champion	Runner-up	Score
2026	(Japan) Yosuke Watanuki (4)	(United Kingdom) Liam Broady	6–3, 6–4
2025	(Japan) Yosuke Watanuki (3)	(Sweden) Elias Ymer	3–6, 6–1, 6–4
2024	(Belgium) Alexander Blockx	(Austria) Jurij Rodionov	6–3, 6–1
2023	(Croatia) Duje Ajduković	(Japan) Sho Shimabukuro	6–4, 6–2
2022	(Japan) Yosuke Watanuki (2)	(Portugal) Frederico Ferreira Silva	6–7^{(3–7)}, 7–5, 6–4
2020–21	Not held		
2019	(Japan) Yosuke Watanuki	(Japan) Yūichi Sugita	6–2, 6–4
2018	(Japan) Tatsuma Ito	(Japan) Yosuke Watanuki	3–6, 7–5, 6–3
2017	(France) Stéphane Robert	(France) Calvin Hemery	7–6^{(7–1)}, 6–7^{(5–7)}, 6–1
2016	(South Korea) Chung Hyeon	(Australia) James Duckworth	6–4, 7–6^{(7–2)}
2015	(Australia) John Millman	(Japan) Taro Daniel	6–1, 6–3

=== Doubles ===
Year	Champion	Runner-up	Score
2026	(New Zealand) Finn Reynolds (New Zealand) James Watt	(Netherlands) Thijmen Loof (Japan) Kaito Uesugi	4–6, 7–6^{(7–5)}, [10–6]
2025	(Austria) Neil Oberleitner (Czech Republic) Michael Vrbenský	(Thailand) Pruchya Isaro (India) Niki Kaliyanda Poonacha	6–7^{(1–7)}, 7–6^{(10–8)}, [10–4]
2024	(United States) Vasil Kirkov (Netherlands) Bart Stevens	(Japan) Kaichi Uchida (Japan) Takeru Yuzuki	7–6^{(9–7)}, 7–5
2023	(United States) Evan King (United States) Reese Stalder	(Australia) Andrew Harris (South Korea) Nam Ji-sung	7–6^{(7–3)}, 2–6, [10–7]
2022	(Japan) Shinji Hazawa (Japan) Yuta Shimizu	(Australia) Andrew Harris (Australia) John-Patrick Smith	6–4, 6–4
2020–21	Not held		
2019	(India) Purav Raja (India) Ramkumar Ramanathan	(Sweden) André Göransson (Indonesia) Christopher Rungkat	7–6^{(8–6)}, 6–3
2018	(Portugal) Gonçalo Oliveira (Australia) Akira Santillan	(China) Li Zhe (Japan) Go Soeda	2–6, 6–4, [12–10]
2017	(Japan) Ben McLachlan (Japan) Yasutaka Uchiyama	(India) Jeevan Nedunchezhiyan (Indonesia) Christopher Rungkat	4–6, 6–3, [10–8]
2016	(Germany) Daniel Masur (Croatia) Ante Pavić	(India) Jeevan Nedunchezhiyan (Indonesia) Christopher Rungkat	4–6, 6–3, [10–6]
2015	(Thailand) Sanchai Ratiwatana (Thailand) Sonchat Ratiwatana	(Chinese Taipei) Chen Ti (Croatia) Franko Škugor	6–4, 2–6, [11–9]
