= 2025 Guangzhou Huangpu International Tennis Open – Doubles =

Doubles
- 2025 Guangzhou Huangpu International Tennis Open

Final
- Champions: (Australia) Matthew Romios (United States) Ryan Seggerman
- Runners-up: (Japan) Kaito Uesugi (Japan) Seita Watanabe
- Score: 6–1, 6–3

Events
Singles	Doubles
← 2024 ·	Guangzhou Huangpu International Tennis Open	· 2026 →

Evan King and Reese Stalder were the defending champions but only Stalder chose to defend his title, partnering Anirudh Chandrasekar. They lost in the quarterfinals to Petr Bar Biryukov and Marat Sharipov.

Matthew Romios and Ryan Seggerman won the title after defeating Kaito Uesugi and Seita Watanabe 6–1, 6–3 in the final.

== Seeds ==
1. (Australia) Matthew Romios / (United States) Ryan Seggerman (champions)
2. (United States) Vasil Kirkov / (Netherlands) Bart Stevens (quarterfinals)
3. (United States) Nathaniel Lammons / (Netherlands) Jean-Julien Rojer (quarterfinals)
4. (India) Anirudh Chandrasekar / (United States) Reese Stalder (quarterfinals)

== Draw ==
Key

- Q = Qualifier
- WC = Wild card
- LL = Lucky loser
- Alt = Alternate
- ITF = ITF entry
- PR = Protected ranking
- SR = Special ranking
- SE = Special exempt
- JE = Junior exempt
- JR = Junior Accelerator Programme entrant
- CO = College Accelerator Programme entrant
- NG = Next Gen Accelerator Program entrant
- w/o = Walkover
- r = Retired
- d = Defaulted

=== Draw ===
First round
1	(Australia) MC Romios (United States) R Seggerman	6	5	[10]
(China) R Te (China) A Wang	4	7	[6]
(Italy) A Binda; I Simakin	7^{7}	2	[10]
(India) A Kadhe (India) VS Prashanth	6^{4}	6	[6]
4	(India) A Chandrasekar (United States) R Stalder	7	3	[10]
Alt	(Japan) Yuichiro Inui (Japan) Yuta Kikuchi	5	6	[5]
(Chinese Taipei) Y-h Hsu (Japan) Y Shimizu	6^{5}	6	[6]
P Bar Biryukov; M Sharipov	7^{7}	3	[10]
(Thailand) P Isaro (India) N Kaliyanda Poonacha	7^{7}	6
P Kotov (Kazakhstan) D Yevseyev	6^{5}	3
(India) S Banthia (India) R Ramanathan	4	2
3	(United States) N Lammons (Netherlands) J-J Rojer	6	6
(Japan) K Uesugi (Japan) S Watanabe	6	7^{7}
WC	(China) Yang Zijiang (China) Zeng Yaojie	2	6^{5}
WC	(China) Y Mo (China) Zhang Tianhui	1	2
2	(United States) V Kirkov (Netherlands) B Stevens	6	6

Quarterfinals
1	(Australia) MC Romios (United States) R Seggerman	7	6
(Italy) A Binda; I Simakin	5	3
4	(India) A Chandrasekar (United States) R Stalder	3	4
P Bar Biryukov; M Sharipov	6	6
(Thailand) P Isaro (India) N Kaliyanda Poonacha	7^{7}	6
3	(United States) N Lammons (Netherlands) J-J Rojer	6^{3}	3
(Japan) K Uesugi (Japan) S Watanabe	6	3	[10]
2	(United States) V Kirkov (Netherlands) B Stevens	2	6	[3]

Semifinals
1	(Australia) MC Romios (United States) R Seggerman	6	6
P Bar Biryukov; M Sharipov	4	2
(Thailand) P Isaro (India) N Kaliyanda Poonacha	6	3	[6]
(Japan) K Uesugi (Japan) S Watanabe	4	6	[10]

Final
1	(Australia) MC Romios (United States) R Seggerman	6	6
(Japan) K Uesugi (Japan) S Watanabe	1	3
