= 2025 Guangzhou Huangpu International Tennis Open – Singles =

Singles
- 2025 Guangzhou Huangpu International Tennis Open

Final
- Champion: (Argentina) Juan Manuel Cerúndolo
- Runner-up: (Chile) Alejandro Tabilo
- Score: 6–2, 6–3

Events
| Singles | Doubles |
| ← 2024 · | Guangzhou Huangpu International Tennis Open | · 2026 → |

Christopher O'Connell was the defending champion but retired from his semifinal match against Alejandro Tabilo.

Juan Manuel Cerúndolo won the title after defeating Tabilo 6–2, 6–3 in the final.

== Seeds ==
1. (Australia) Christopher O'Connell (semifinals, retired)
2. (Argentina) Juan Manuel Cerúndolo (champion)
3. (United States) Nishesh Basavareddy (quarterfinals)
4. (Georgia (country)) Nikoloz Basilashvili (first round)
5. (United States) Tristan Boyer (withdrew)
6. (Chile) Alejandro Tabilo (final)
7. (United Kingdom) Dan Evans (quarterfinals, retired)
8. (United Kingdom) Billy Harris (semifinals)
9. (Japan) Taro Daniel (first round)

== Draw ==
Key

- Q = Qualifier
- WC = Wild card
- LL = Lucky loser
- Alt = Alternate
- ITF = ITF entry
- PR = Protected ranking
- SR = Special ranking
- SE = Special exempt
- JE = Junior exempt
- JR = Junior Accelerator Programme entrant
- CO = College Accelerator Programme entrant
- NG = Next Gen Accelerator Program entrant
- w/o = Walkover
- r = Retired
- d = Defaulted

=== Finals ===
Semifinals
1 | (Australia) Christopher O'Connell | 1^{r}
6 | (Chile) Alejandro Tabilo | 2
8 | (United Kingdom) Billy Harris | 2 | 6 | 4
2 | (Argentina) Juan Manuel Cerúndolo | 6 | 2 | 6

Final
6 | (Chile) Alejandro Tabilo | 2 | 3
2 | (Argentina) Juan Manuel Cerúndolo | 6 | 6

=== Top half ===
First round
1 | (Australia) C O'Connell | 6 | 6
WC | (China) R Te | 4 | 4
Q | (Thailand) K Samrej | 5 | 6^{4}
(United States) C Eubanks | 7 | 7^{7}
Q | (Switzerland) L Castelnuovo | 7^{7} | 7^{7}
(Australia) O Jasika | 6^{2} | 6^{4}
M Sharipov | 7^{7} | 1 | 6
9 | (Japan) T Daniel | 6^{5} | 6 | 4
3 | (United States) N Basavareddy | 6 | 6
Q | (India) R Ramanathan | 1 | 4
LL | (United States) E Zhu | 6^{4} | 2
(Italy) G Zeppieri | 7^{7} | 6
Q | (Japan) Yuta Kikuchi | 6 | 3 | 3
(Chinese Taipei) Y-h Hsu | 4 | 6 | 6
P Kotov | 6^{4} | 4
6 | (Chile) A Tabilo | 7^{7} | 6

Second round
1 | (Australia) C O'Connell | 3 | 6 | 6
(United States) C Eubanks | 6 | 3 | 4
Q | (Switzerland) L Castelnuovo | 6 | 6^{5} | 2
M Sharipov | 3 | 7^{7} | 6
3 | (United States) N Basavareddy | 6 | 1
(Italy) G Zeppieri | 4 | 0^{r}
(Chinese Taipei) Y-h Hsu | 2 | 1
6 | (Chile) A Tabilo | 6 | 6

Quarterfinals
1 | (Australia) C O'Connell | 6 | 6
M Sharipov | 4 | 4
3 | (United States) N Basavareddy | 7 | 5 | 2
6 | (Chile) A Tabilo | 5 | 7 | 6

Semifinals
1 | (Australia) C O'Connell | 1^{r}
6 | (Chile) A Tabilo | 2

=== Bottom half ===
First round
8 | (United Kingdom) B Harris | 6 | 4
(Kazakhstan) D Yevseyev | 4 | 0^{r}
(France) A Géa | 6 | 6
Q | (Italy) A Binda | 4 | 4
(Belgium) G Onclin | 6 | 6
I Simakin | 2 | 4
(Australia) J McCabe | 6 | 6
4 | (Georgia (country)) N Basilashvili | 3 | 4
7 | (United Kingdom) D Evans | 6 | 6
WC | (China) Charles Chen | 4 | 4
(United Kingdom) O Crawford | 6 | 6
WC | (China) Xiao Linang | 3 | 4
Alt | P Bar Biryukov | 7 | 6
Q | (China) Zhang Tianhui | 5 | 1
(Japan) Y Shimizu | 1 | 4
2 | (Argentina) JM Cerúndolo | 6 | 6

Second round
8 | (United Kingdom) B Harris | 7 | 7^{8}
(France) A Géa | 5 | 6^{6}
(Belgium) G Onclin | 6 | 4
(Australia) J McCabe | 1 | 1^{r}
7 | (United Kingdom) D Evans | 3 | 7^{9} | 6
(United Kingdom) O Crawford | 6 | 6^{7} | 1
Alt | P Bar Biryukov | 1 | 1^{r}
2 | (Argentina) JM Cerúndolo | 6 | 2

Quarterfinals
8 | (United Kingdom) B Harris | 6 | 7^{8}
(Belgium) G Onclin | 2 | 6^{6}
7 | (United Kingdom) D Evans | 6 | 2^{r}
2 | (Argentina) JM Cerúndolo | 4 | 1

Semifinals
8 | (United Kingdom) B Harris | 2 | 6 | 4
2 | (Argentina) JM Cerúndolo | 6 | 2 | 6
