= 2024 Guangzhou Huangpu International Tennis Open =

- Date: 9–15 September
- Edition: 1st
- Surface: Hard
- Location: Guangzhou, China

Champions

Singles
- (Australia) Christopher O'Connell

Doubles
- (United States) Evan King / (United States) Reese Stalder
Guangzhou Huangpu International Tennis Open	· 2025 →

The 2024 Guangzhou Huangpu International Tennis Open was a professional tennis tournament played on hardcourts. It was the first edition of the tournament which was part of the 2024 ATP Challenger Tour. It took place in Guangzhou, China between 9 and 15 September 2024.

== Singles main-draw entrants ==
=== Seeds ===
Country	Player	Rank^{1}	Seed
AUS	Christopher O'Connell	87	1
ITA	Luca Nardi	90	2
KAZ	Mikhail Kukushkin	117	3
FRA	Térence Atmane	120	4
MDA	Radu Albot	138	5
USA	Maxime Cressy	161	6
ARG	Federico Agustín Gómez	182	7
GBR	Paul Jubb	192	8

^{1} Rankings are as of 26 August 2024.

=== Other entrants ===
The following players received wildcards into the singles main draw:

- (China) Mo Yecong
- (China) Xiao Linang
- (China) Zeng Yaojie

The following players received entry from the qualifying draw:

- (India) Rishab Agarwal
- Evgeny Donskoy
- (Greece) Markos Kalovelonis
- (Malaysia) Mitsuki Wei Kang Leong
- (Thailand) Wishaya Trongcharoenchaikul
- (South Africa) Kris van Wyk

== Champions ==
=== Singles ===
- (Australia) Christopher O'Connell def. (Japan) Sho Shimabukuro 1–6, 7–5, 7–6^{(7–5)}.

=== Doubles ===
- (United States) Evan King / (United States) Reese Stalder def. (Philippines) Francis Alcantara / (Thailand) Pruchya Isaro 4–6, 7–5, [10–5].
