= 2023 Caribbean Open =

- Date: 12–18 June
- Edition: 1st
- Surface: Hard
- Location: Palmas del Mar, Puerto Rico

Champions

Singles
- (Japan) Kei Nishikori

Doubles
- (United States) Evan King / (United States) Reese Stalder
| Caribbean Open | · 2024 → |

The 2023 Caribbean Open was a professional tennis tournament played on hard courts. It was the 1st edition of the tournament which was part of the 2023 ATP Challenger Tour. It took place in Palmas del Mar, Puerto Rico between 12 and 18 June 2023.

== Singles main-draw entrants ==
=== Seeds ===
| Country | Player | Rank^{1} | Seed |
|---|---|---|---|
| TPE | Wu Tung-lin | 182 | 1 |
| USA | Nicolas Moreno de Alboran | 187 | 2 |
| AUS | Marc Polmans | 194 | 3 |
| FRA | Antoine Escoffier | 202 | 4 |
| AUS | Dane Sweeny | 236 | 5 |
| JPN | Yuta Shimizu | 256 | 6 |
| USA | Mitchell Krueger | 258 | 7 |
| CAN | Alexis Galarneau | 259 | 8 |

- ^{1} Rankings are as of 29 May 2023.

=== Other entrants ===
The following players received wildcards into the singles main draw:

- (Puerto Rico) Alexander Bravo
- (Canada) Liam Draxl
- (Japan) Kei Nishikori

The following players received entry into the singles main draw using protected rankings:

- (Australia) Alex Bolt
- (New Zealand) Rubin Statham

The following players received entry from the qualifying draw:

- (United States) Nick Chappell
- (Brazil) Gustavo Heide
- (Northern Mariana Islands) Colin Sinclair
- (Australia) Bernard Tomic
- (United States) Michael Zheng
- (United States) Evan Zhu

The following players received entry as lucky losers:

- (Romania) Marius Copil
- (United States) Alex Rybakov

== Champions ==
=== Singles ===
- (Japan) Kei Nishikori def. (United States) Michael Zheng 6–2, 7–5.

=== Doubles ===
- (United States) Evan King / (United States) Reese Stalder def. (Japan) Toshihide Matsui / (Japan) Kaito Uesugi 3–6, 7–5, [11–9].
