= 2026 Guangzhou Huangpu International Tennis Open – Singles =

Singles
- 2026 Guangzhou Huangpu International Tennis Open

Final
- Champion: Marat Sharipov
- Runner-up: Pavel Kotov
- Score: 6–0, 6–3

Events
Singles	Doubles
- Guangzhou Huangpu International Tennis Open

Juan Manuel Cerúndolo was the defending champion but chose not to defend his title.

Marat Sharipov won the title after defeating Pavel Kotov 6–0, 6–3 in the final. It was Sharipov's first Challenger title.

== Seeds ==
1. (Japan) Shintaro Mochizuki (first round)
2. (Georgia (country)) Nikoloz Basilashvili (first round, retired)
3. (South Africa) Lloyd Harris (second round)
4. (Australia) Bernard Tomic (semifinals)
5. (Italy) Federico Cinà (first round)
6. (Canada) Alexis Galarneau (first round)
7. (Sweden) Elias Ymer (quarterfinals)
8. (Japan) Rio Noguchi (quarterfinals)

== Draw ==
Key

- Q = Qualifier
- WC = Wild card
- LL = Lucky loser
- Alt = Alternate
- ITF = ITF entry
- PR = Protected ranking
- SR = Special ranking
- SE = Special exempt
- JE = Junior exempt
- JR = Junior Accelerator Programme entrant
- CO = College Accelerator Programme entrant
- NG = Next Gen Accelerator Program entrant
- w/o = Walkover
- r = Retired
- d = Defaulted

=== Finals ===
Semifinals
Pavel Kotov	7^{7}	7^{7}
4	(Australia) Bernard Tomic	6^{3}	6^{3}
Marat Sharipov	7	6
Petr Bar Biryukov	5	3

Final
Pavel Kotov	0	3
Marat Sharipov	6	6

=== Top half ===
First round
1	(Japan) S Mochizuki	6^{4}	1
P Kotov	7^{7}	6
WC	(China) Zeng Yaojie	5	3
(Japan) A Santillan	7	6
(Northern Mariana Islands) C Sinclair	6	1	7^{7}
WC	(China) Xiao Linang	4	6	6^{5}
(Japan) K Uchida	6	2	3
8	(Japan) R Noguchi	3	6	6
4	(Australia) B Tomic	6	6
Q	(Japan) Yuta Kikuchi	0	2
(Australia) Ja Delaney	4	6	6
(Japan) Hikaru Shiraishi	6	3	4
Q	(Italy) A Binda	6	6
WC	(China) A Wang	3	4
(China) F Sun	7	3	7
6	(Canada) A Galarneau	5	6	5

Second round
P Kotov	6	7^{7}
(Japan) A Santillan	4	6^{4}
(Northern Mariana Islands) C Sinclair	3	3
8	(Japan) R Noguchi	6	6
4	(Australia) B Tomic	6	6
(Australia) Ja Delaney	3	2
Q	(Italy) A Binda	4	7^{7}	6
(China) F Sun	6	6^{4}	4

Quarterfinals
P Kotov	6	7^{7}
8	(Japan) R Noguchi	1	6^{2}
4	(Australia) B Tomic	6	6
Q	(Italy) A Binda	3	4

Semifinals
P Kotov	7^{7}	7^{7}
4	(Australia) B Tomic	6^{3}	6^{3}

=== Bottom half ===
First round
7	(Sweden) E Ymer	5	7	6
Semen Pankin	7	5	3
(Switzerland) L Castelnuovo	6^{6}	6	1
(Australia) O Jasika	7^{8}	2	0^{r}
M Sharipov	6	6
LL	(Australia) T Fancutt	2	3
(Japan) H Matsuoka	7^{8}	5	6^{4}
3	(South Africa) L Harris	6^{6}	7	7^{7}
5	(Italy) F Cinà	4	1
Q	(Japan) J Trotter	6	6
Q	(Malaysia) Mitsuki Wei Kang Leong	6	6
(Uzbekistan) S Fomin	3	1
Q	(Australia) Je Delaney	3	4
P Bar Biryukov	6	6
Q	(Japan) Naoya Honda	2	7^{8}	0
2	(Georgia (country)) N Basilashvili	6	6^{6}	0^{r}

Second round
7	(Sweden) E Ymer	7^{8}	6
(Switzerland) L Castelnuovo	6^{6}	4
M Sharipov	4	7^{8}	6
3	(South Africa) L Harris	6	6^{6}	3
Q	(Japan) J Trotter	2	3
Q	(Malaysia) MWK Leong	6	6
P Bar Biryukov	6	6
Q	(Japan) N Honda	3	4

Quarterfinals
7	(Sweden) E Ymer	6^{4}	3
M Sharipov	7^{7}	6
Q	(Malaysia) MWK Leong	6^{3}	6	6^{0}
P Bar Biryukov	7^{7}	4	7^{7}

Semifinals
M Sharipov	7	6
P Bar Biryukov	5	3
