= 2024 Torneio Internacional Masculino de Tênis =

- Date: 18–24 November
- Edition: 1st
- Surface: Hard
- Location: Barueri, Brazil

Champions

Singles
- (Argentina) Francisco Comesaña

Doubles
- (Argentina) Federico Agustín Gómez / (Venezuela) Luis David Martínez
- Torneio Internacional Masculino de Tênis

The 2024 Torneio Internacional Masculino de Tênis – Ano VII was a professional tennis tournament played on hard courts. It was the first edition of the tournament which was part of the 2024 ATP Challenger Tour. It took place in Barueri, Brazil between 18 and 24 November 2024.

== Singles main draw entrants ==
=== Seeds ===
Country	Player	Rank^{1}	Seed
USA	Aleksandar Kovacevic	92	1
BRA	Thiago Monteiro	99	2
ARG	Francisco Comesaña	102	3
~~ARG~~	~~Camilo Ugo Carabelli~~	~~108~~	~~4~~
ARG	Thiago Agustín Tirante	123	5
ARG	Federico Agustín Gómez	138	6
CHI	Tomás Barrios Vera	151	7
BRA	Felipe Meligeni Alves	166	8

- ^{1} Rankings as of 11 November 2024.

=== Other entrants ===
The following players received wildcards into the singles main draw:

- (Brazil) Pedro Boscardin Dias
- (Brazil) Orlando Luz
- (Brazil) João Lucas Reis da Silva

The following player received entry into the singles main draw using a protected ranking:

- (Argentina) Nicolás Kicker

The following players received entry into the singles main draw as alternates:

- (Brazil) Matheus Pucinelli de Almeida
- (Brazil) Pedro Sakamoto
- (Chile) Matías Soto

The following players received entry from the qualifying draw:

- (United States) Garrett Johns
- (Argentina) Lautaro Midón
- (Argentina) Renzo Olivo
- (Argentina) Juan Pablo Paz
- (Brazil) Paulo André Saraiva dos Santos
- (Argentina) Gonzalo Villanueva

The following player received entry as a lucky loser:

- (Argentina) Luciano Emanuel Ambrogi

== Champions ==
=== Singles ===
- (Argentina) Francisco Comesaña def. (Argentina) Thiago Agustín Tirante 7–5, 4–6, 6–4.

=== Doubles ===
- (Argentina) Federico Agustín Gómez / (Venezuela) Luis David Martínez def. (United States) Christian Harrison / (United States) Evan King 7–6^{(7–4)}, 7–5.
