= 2024 Torneio Internacional Masculino de Tênis – Singles =

Singles
- 2024 Torneio Internacional Masculino de Tênis

Final
- Champion: (Argentina) Francisco Comesaña
- Runner-up: (Argentina) Thiago Agustín Tirante
- Score: 7–5, 4–6, 6–4

Events
Singles	Doubles
- Torneio Internacional Masculino de Tênis

This was the first edition of the tournament.

Francisco Comesaña won the title after defeating Thiago Agustín Tirante 7–5, 4–6, 6–4 in the final.

== Seeds ==
1. (United States) Aleksandar Kovacevic (second round)
2. (Brazil) Thiago Monteiro (second round)
3. (Argentina) Francisco Comesaña (champion)
4. (Argentina) Camilo Ugo Carabelli (withdrew)
5. (Argentina) Thiago Agustín Tirante (final)
6. (Argentina) Federico Agustín Gómez (first round)
7. (Chile) Tomás Barrios Vera (semifinals)
8. (Brazil) Felipe Meligeni Alves (quarterfinals)

== Draw ==
Key

- Q = Qualifier
- WC = Wild card
- LL = Lucky loser
- Alt = Alternate
- ITF = ITF entry
- PR = Protected ranking
- SR = Special ranking
- SE = Special exempt
- JE = Junior exempt
- JR = Junior Accelerator Programme entrant
- CO = College Accelerator Programme entrant
- NG = Next Gen Accelerator Program entrant
- w/o = Walkover
- r = Retired
- d = Defaulted

=== Finals ===
Semifinals
Alt	(Chile) Matías Soto	2	7^{9}	6^{1}
3	(Argentina) Francisco Comesaña	6	6^{7}	7^{7}
7	(Chile) Tomás Barrios Vera	6^{4}	5
5	(Argentina) Thiago Agustín Tirante	7^{7}	7

Final
3	(Argentina) Francisco Comesaña	7	4	6
5	(Argentina) Thiago Agustín Tirante	5	6	4

=== Top half ===
First round
1	(United States) A Kovacevic	6	7^{7}
Alt	(Brazil) M Pucinelli de Almeida	2	6^{4}
(Brazil) G Heide	6	6
WC	(Brazil) JL Reis da Silva	3	4
(Bolivia) JC Prado Ángelo	6	6
(Ecuador) Á Guillén Meza	4	1
Alt	(Chile) M Soto	7	7^{7}
6	(Argentina) FA Gómez	5	6^{4}
3	(Argentina) F Comesaña	6	6
WC	(Brazil) O Luz	3	2
(Argentina) JP Ficovich	6	6
(Switzerland) R Bertola	3	3
(Australia) B Tomic	6	6^{2}	6
(Peru) G Bueno	3	7^{7}	1
Q	(Argentina) L Midón	2	5
8	(Brazil) F Meligeni Alves	6	7

Second round
1	(United States) A Kovacevic	3	4
(Brazil) G Heide	6	6
(Bolivia) JC Prado Ángelo	3	4
Alt	(Chile) M Soto	6	6
3	(Argentina) F Comesaña	6^{7}	6	7^{8}
(Argentina) JP Ficovich	7^{9}	4	6^{6}
(Australia) B Tomic	4	6	4
8	(Brazil) F Meligeni Alves	6	3	6

Quarterfinals
(Brazil) G Heide	1	2
Alt	(Chile) M Soto	6	6
3	(Argentina) F Comesaña	6	6
8	(Brazil) F Meligeni Alves	3	4

Semifinals
Alt	(Chile) M Soto	2	7^{9}	6^{1}
3	(Argentina) F Comesaña	6	6^{7}	7^{7}

=== Bottom half ===
First round
7	(Chile) T Barrios Vera	7^{8}	4	7^{7}
(Brazil) M Alves	6^{6}	6	6^{2}
Alt	(Brazil) P Sakamoto	6	6
WC	(Brazil) P Boscardin Dias	3	4
(United Kingdom) J Clarke	4	6	2
PR	(Argentina) N Kicker	6	4	6
Q	(United States) G Johns	6	6
LL	(Argentina) LE Ambrogi	4	4
5	(Argentina) TA Tirante	6	6
Q	(Argentina) R Olivo	2	2
Q	(Argentina) G Villanueva	6^{5}	4
(Argentina) JB Torres	7^{7}	6
(Lebanon) H Habib	6	6^{5}	6
Q	(Argentina) JP Paz	3	7^{7}	3
Q	(Brazil) PA Saraiva dos Santos	3	3
2	(Brazil) T Monteiro	6	6

Second round
7	(Chile) T Barrios Vera	7	3	6
Alt	(Brazil) P Sakamoto	5	6	3
PR	(Argentina) N Kicker	3	1
Q	(United States) G Johns	6	6
5	(Argentina) TA Tirante	7	6
(Argentina) JB Torres	5	4
(Lebanon) H Habib	4	7^{7}	6
2	(Brazil) T Monteiro	6	6^{2}	4

Quarterfinals
7	(Chile) T Barrios Vera	6	6
Q	(United States) G Johns	3	1
5	(Argentina) TA Tirante	7^{7}	4	6
(Lebanon) H Habib	6^{3}	6	4

Semifinals
7	(Chile) T Barrios Vera	6^{4}	5
5	(Argentina) TA Tirante	7^{7}	7
