= ATP Challenger São Paulo =

ATP Challenger São Paulo may refer to:

- Torneio Internacional Masculino de Tênis (2024-present)
- São Paulo Challenger de Tênis (2021–2013)
- IS Open de Tênis (2015, 2013–2012)
- Aberto de São Paulo (2014–2001)
- Copa Petrobras São Paulo (2010–2004)
