= 2024 Guangzhou Huangpu International Tennis Open – Doubles =

Doubles
- 2024 Guangzhou Huangpu International Tennis Open

Final
- Champions: (United States) Evan King (United States) Reese Stalder
- Runners-up: (Philippines) Francis Alcantara (Thailand) Pruchya Isaro
- Score: 4–6, 7–5, [10–5]

Events
Singles	Doubles
Guangzhou Huangpu International Tennis Open	· 2025 →

This was the first edition of the tournament.

Evan King and Reese Stalder won the title after defeating Francis Alcantara and Pruchya Isaro 4–6, 7–5, [10–5] in the final.

== Seeds ==
1. (United States) Evan King / (United States) Reese Stalder (champions)
2. (India) Rithvik Choudary Bollipalli / (India) Arjun Kadhe (semifinals)
3. (Japan) Toshihide Matsui / (Japan) Kaito Uesugi (first round)
4. (Netherlands) David Pel / (Netherlands) Bart Stevens (quarterfinals)

== Draw ==
=== Key ===
- Q = Qualifier
- WC = Wild card
- LL = Lucky loser
- Alt = Alternate
- SE = Special exempt
- PR = Protected ranking
- ITF = ITF entry
- JE = Junior exempt
- w/o = Walkover
- r = Retired
- d = Defaulted
- SR = Special ranking

=== Draw ===
First round
1	(United States) E King (United States) R Stalder	6	6
(France) T Lamasine (Czech Republic) D Svrčina	4	3
(Australia) M Polmans (Australia) MC Romios	6	6
E Gerasimov (Kazakhstan) M Kukushkin	4	4
4	(Netherlands) D Pel (Netherlands) B Stevens	4	7	[15]
(Japan) S Watanabe (Japan) T Yuzuki	6	5	[13]
(Australia) B Bayldon (Australia) T Fancutt	6	6
WC	(China) Yang Zijiang (China) Zeng Yaojie	3	2
(Greece) M Kalovelonis (Ukraine) Vadym Ursu	4	6	[8]
(Philippines) FC Alcantara (Thailand) P Isaro	6	4	[10]
WC	(China) Y Bai (China) Dong Zhenxiong	7	7
3	(Japan) T Matsui (Japan) K Uesugi	5	5
(China) J Cui (China) Y Mo	2	4
(Argentina) FA Gómez (Japan) K Uchida	6	6
Ivan Denisov; A Kachmazov	7^{7}	1	[4]
2	(India) RC Bollipalli (India) A Kadhe	6^{5}	6	[10]

Quarterfinals
1	(United States) E King (United States) R Stalder	3	7	[10]
(Australia) M Polmans (Australia) MC Romios	6	5	[7]
4	(Netherlands) D Pel (Netherlands) B Stevens	6	3	[5]
(Australia) B Bayldon (Australia) T Fancutt	4	6	[10]
(Philippines) FC Alcantara (Thailand) P Isaro	6	5	[10]
WC	(China) Y Bai (China) Z Dong	4	7	[8]
(Argentina) FA Gómez (Japan) K Uchida	6^{6}	6^{7}
2	(India) RC Bollipalli (India) A Kadhe	7^{8}	7^{9}

Semifinals
1	(United States) E King (United States) R Stalder	7	6
(Australia) B Bayldon (Australia) T Fancutt	5	3
(Philippines) FC Alcantara (Thailand) P Isaro	1	7^{7}	[11]
2	(India) RC Bollipalli (India) A Kadhe	6	6^{5}	[9]

Final
1	(United States) E King (United States) R Stalder	4	7	[10]
(Philippines) FC Alcantara (Thailand) P Isaro	6	5	[5]
