= 2026 Guangzhou Huangpu International Tennis Open – Doubles =

Doubles
- 2026 Guangzhou Huangpu International Tennis Open

Final
- Champions: (Australia) Blake Bayldon (India) Arjun Kadhe
- Runners-up: (Mexico) Miguel Ángel Reyes-Varela (United States) Reese Stalder
- Score: 7–5, 3–6, [10–7]

Events
Singles	Doubles
- Guangzhou Huangpu International Tennis Open

Matthew Romios and Ryan Seggerman were the defending champions but chose not to defend their title.

Blake Bayldon and Arjun Kadhe won the title after defeating Miguel Ángel Reyes-Varela and Reese Stalder 7–5, 3–6, [10–7] in the final.

== Seeds ==
1. (Mexico) Miguel Ángel Reyes-Varela / (United States) Reese Stalder (final)
2. (Netherlands) Thijmen Loof / (Japan) Kaito Uesugi (semifinals)
3. (Australia) Blake Bayldon / (India) Arjun Kadhe (champions)
4. (Australia) Thomas Fancutt / (Japan) Seita Watanabe (quarterfinals)

== Draw ==
Key

- Q = Qualifier
- WC = Wild card
- LL = Lucky loser
- Alt = Alternate
- ITF = ITF entry
- PR = Protected ranking
- SR = Special ranking
- SE = Special exempt
- JE = Junior exempt
- JR = Junior Accelerator Programme entrant
- CO = College Accelerator Programme entrant
- NG = Next Gen Accelerator Program entrant
- w/o = Walkover
- r = Retired
- d = Defaulted

First round
1	(Mexico) M Reyes-Varela (United States) R Stalder	6	6
(Australia) Ja Delaney (Australia) Je Delaney	2	4
(Japan) A Santillan (China) F Sun	7	6
P Bar Biryukov (Italy) A Binda	5	2
4	(Australia) T Fancutt (Japan) S Watanabe	6	6
WC	(Switzerland) L Castelnuovo (China) Xiao Linang	3	3
(Chinese Taipei) C-p Hsieh (Chinese Taipei) T-h Huang	2	6	[10]
(Uzbekistan) S Fomin (China) A Wang	6	3	[8]
(Australia) O Jasika (Australia) B Tomic	3	6	[10]
(Japan) J Trotter (Japan) K Uchida	6	3	[12]
Semen Pankin (Sweden) E Ymer	4	4
3	(Australia) B Bayldon (India) A Kadhe	6	6
WC	(China) Yang Zijiang (China) Zeng Yaojie	6^{7}	6	[6]
(Chinese Taipei) J Hsu (China) B Zheng	7^{9}	3	[10]
(Canada) A Galarneau (Antigua and Barbuda) J Maginley	2	3
2	(Netherlands) T Loof (Japan) K Uesugi	6	6

Quarterfinals
1	(Mexico) M Reyes-Varela (United States) R Stalder	4	7^{7}	[11]
(Japan) A Santillan (China) F Sun	6	6^{3}	[9]
4	(Australia) T Fancutt (Japan) S Watanabe	5	5
(Chinese Taipei) C-p Hsieh (Chinese Taipei) T-h Huang	7	7
(Japan) J Trotter (Japan) K Uchida	5	6	[5]
3	(Australia) B Bayldon (India) A Kadhe	7	3	[10]
(Chinese Taipei) J Hsu (China) B Zheng	1	1
2	(Netherlands) T Loof (Japan) K Uesugi	6	6

Semifinals
1	(Mexico) M Reyes-Varela (United States) R Stalder	6	6^{5}	[10]
(Chinese Taipei) C-p Hsieh (Chinese Taipei) T-h Huang	3	7^{7}	[4]
3	(Australia) B Bayldon (India) A Kadhe	4	6	[10]
2	(Netherlands) T Loof (Japan) K Uesugi	6	3	[5]

Final
1	(Mexico) M Reyes-Varela (United States) R Stalder	5	6	[7]
3	(Australia) B Bayldon (India) A Kadhe	7	3	[10]
