= Palmas del Mar Tropical Forest =

Protected forest in Humacao, Puerto Rico

Coordinates: 18°05′33″N 65°48′00″W

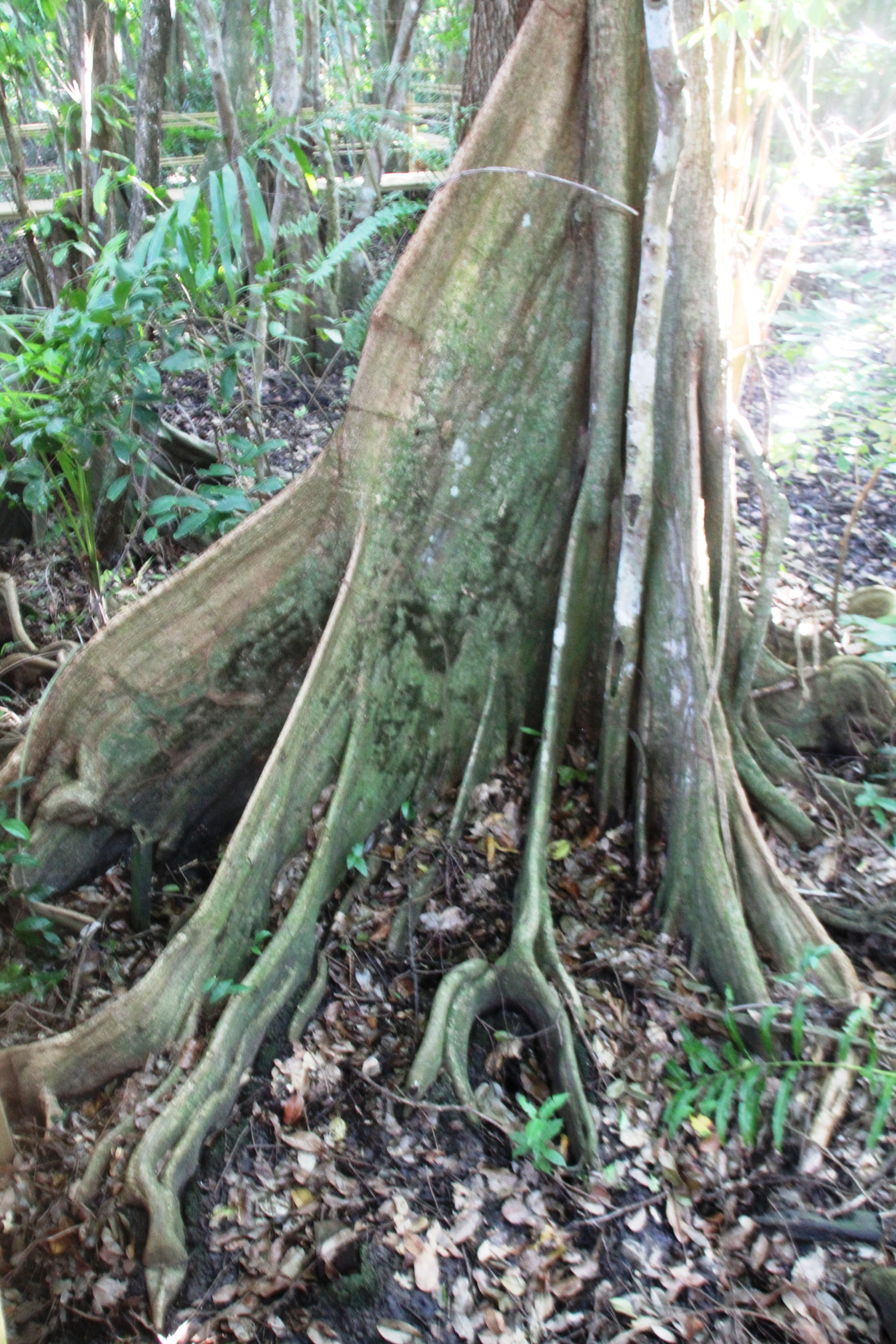
Pterocarpus officinalis in Palmas del Mar.

Palmas del Mar Tropical Forest, also known as the Palmas del Mar Pterocarpus Forest, is located in and near the beach resort community of Palmas del Mar in Humacao, Puerto Rico. The 144 acres of forest tracts belonging to the Palmas del Mar Tropical Forest are protected by conservation easement laws (Spanish: Ley de servidumbre de conservación) between Palmas del Mar Properties Inc. and the Conservation Trust of Puerto Rico (Spanish: Fideicomiso de Conservación de Puerto Rico) since 2010. It consists of secondary forests, mangroves and, most notably, a Pterocarpus forest. The Candelero River also crosses the forest area and its mouth is also located just north of the forest limits.

A total of 456 tree species has been documented in the area, including the notable palo de pollo (Pterocarpus officinalis) and the ortegon (Coccoloba rugosa). The forest is also considered an important bird area, many of which are migratory. 52 species of animals have been documented in the forest, including 12 of which are endemic to Puerto Rico. In addition to its flora and fauna, the forest is important as a natural protection against flooding and coastal erosion.

== See also ==
- Palmas del Mar
- Protected areas of Puerto Rico
