= 2024 Guangzhou Huangpu International Tennis Open – Singles =

Singles
- 2024 Guangzhou Huangpu International Tennis Open

Final
- Champion: (Australia) Christopher O'Connell
- Runner-up: (Japan) Sho Shimabukuro
- Score: 1–6, 7–5, 7–6^{(7–5)}

Events
Singles	Doubles
Guangzhou Huangpu International Tennis Open	· 2025 →

This was the first edition of the tournament.

Christopher O'Connell won the title after defeating Sho Shimabukuro 1–6, 7–5, 7–6^{(7–5)} in the final.

== Seeds ==
1. (Australia) Christopher O'Connell (champion)
2. (Italy) Luca Nardi (semifinals)
3. (Kazakhstan) Mikhail Kukushkin (semifinals)
4. (France) Térence Atmane (quarterfinals)
5. (Moldova) Radu Albot (quarterfinals)
6. (United States) Maxime Cressy (first round)
7. (Argentina) Federico Agustín Gómez (quarterfinals)
8. (United Kingdom) Paul Jubb (second round)

== Draw ==
=== Key ===
- Q = Qualifier
- WC = Wild card
- LL = Lucky loser
- Alt = Alternate
- SE = Special exempt
- PR = Protected ranking
- ITF = ITF entry
- JE = Junior exempt
- w/o = Walkover
- r = Retired
- d = Defaulted
- SR = Special ranking

=== Finals ===
Semifinals
1	(Australia) Christopher O'Connell	6	6
3	(Kazakhstan) Mikhail Kukushkin	4	2
(Japan) Sho Shimabukuro	6	6
2	(Italy) Luca Nardi	2	4

Final
1	(Australia) Christopher O'Connell	1	7	7^{7}
(Japan) Sho Shimabukuro	6	5	6^{5}

=== Top half ===
First round
1	(Australia) C O'Connell	6	6
(France) T Lamasine	3	2
Q	(Greece) M Kalovelonis	2	5
WC	(China) Y Mo	6	7
A Zakharov	4	4
Q	(Thailand) W Trongcharoenchaikul	6	6
WC	(China) Zeng Yaojie	4	7^{7}	5
5	(Moldova) R Albot	6	6^{2}	7
3	(Kazakhstan) M Kukushkin	6	6
Q	E Donskoy	4	4
(Czech Republic) D Svrčina	7	6
(Japan) Y Uchiyama	5	4
Q	(India) Rishab Agarwal	2	4
(Australia) J McCabe	6	6
E Gerasimov	4	5
7	(Argentina) FA Gómez	6	7

Second round
1	(Australia) C O'Connell	6	2
WC	(China) Y Mo	2	1^{r}
Q	(Thailand) W Trongcharoenchaikul	3	2
5	(Moldova) R Albot	6	6
3	(Kazakhstan) M Kukushkin	2	6	6
(Czech Republic) D Svrčina	6	1	2
(Australia) J McCabe	3	2
7	(Argentina) FA Gómez	6	6

Quarterfinals
1	(Australia) C O'Connell	6	6^{6}	6
5	(Moldova) R Albot	4	7^{8}	3
3	(Kazakhstan) M Kukushkin	6	6
7	(Argentina) FA Gómez	2	2

Semifinals
1	(Australia) C O'Connell	6	6
3	(Kazakhstan) M Kukushkin	4	2

=== Bottom half ===
First round
6	(United States) M Cressy	6^{10}	3
(Japan) S Shimabukuro	7^{12}	6
(China) Y Bai	6	6
(Australia) B Mott	2	4
(Japan) K Uchida	6	2	2
Q	(Malaysia) Mitsuki Wei Kang Leong	4	6	6
(Japan) R Noguchi	3	4
4	(France) T Atmane	6	6
8	(United Kingdom) P Jubb	6	6
WC	(China) Xiao Linang	3	4
(Ukraine) Vadym Ursu	5	1
(Australia) M Polmans	7	6
Q	(South Africa) Kris van Wyk	7^{7}	6
A Kachmazov	6^{5}	4
(China) J Cui	4	6	6^{4}
2	(Italy) L Nardi	6	3	7^{7}

Second round
(Japan) S Shimabukuro	3	7^{7}	0
(China) Y Bai	6	6^{3}	1^{r}
Q	(Malaysia) MWK Leong	1	7	3
4	(France) T Atmane	6	5	6
8	(United Kingdom) P Jubb	3	1
(Australia) M Polmans	6	6
Q	(South Africa) K van Wyk	2	6^{4}
2	(Italy) L Nardi	6	7^{7}

Quarterfinals
(Japan) S Shimabukuro	7^{12}	5	7
4	(France) T Atmane	6^{10}	7	5
(Australia) M Polmans	4	3
2	(Italy) L Nardi	6	6

Semifinals
(Japan) S Shimabukuro	6	6
2	(Italy) L Nardi	2	4
