= 2023 Caribbean Open – Singles =

Singles
- 2023 Caribbean Open

Final
- Champion: (Japan) Kei Nishikori
- Runner-up: (United States) Michael Zheng
- Score: 6–2, 7–5

Events
Singles	Doubles
- Caribbean Open

This was the first edition of the tournament.

Kei Nishikori won the title after defeating Michael Zheng 6–2, 7–5 in the final in his first match since 2021. Nishikori became the first unranked player in history to win an ATP Challenger title.

== Seeds ==
1. (Chinese Taipei) Wu Tung-lin (first round)
2. (United States) Nicolas Moreno de Alboran (first round)
3. (Australia) Marc Polmans (first round)
4. (France) Antoine Escoffier (first round)
5. (Australia) Dane Sweeny (second round)
6. (Japan) Yuta Shimizu (first round)
7. (United States) Mitchell Krueger (second round)
8. (Canada) Alexis Galarneau (quarterfinals)

== Draw ==
Key

- Q = Qualifier
- WC = Wild card
- LL = Lucky loser
- Alt = Alternate
- ITF = ITF entry
- PR = Protected ranking
- SR = Special ranking
- SE = Special exempt
- JE = Junior exempt
- JR = Junior Accelerator Programme entrant
- CO = College Accelerator Programme entrant
- NG = Next Gen Accelerator Program entrant
- w/o = Walkover
- r = Retired
- d = Defaulted

=== Finals ===
Semifinals
(Kazakhstan) Beibit Zhukayev	6	3	6^{4}
Q	(United States) Michael Zheng	3	6	7^{7}
WC	(Japan) Kei Nishikori	6	6
Q	(Brazil) Gustavo Heide	4	2

Final
Q	(United States) Michael Zheng	2	5
WC	(Japan) Kei Nishikori	6	7

=== Top half ===
First round
1	(Chinese Taipei) T-l Wu	6	5	6^{4}
WC	(Canada) L Draxl	3	7	7^{7}
Q	(Northern Mariana Islands) C Sinclair	6	6
WC	(Puerto Rico) Alexander Bravo	2	0
Q	(United States) E Zhu	7^{7}	6
(Norway) V Durasovic	6^{4}	4
(Kazakhstan) B Zhukayev	6	6
6	(Japan) Y Shimizu	3	4
4	(France) A Escoffier	6^{5}	4
LL	(Romania) M Copil	7^{7}	6
(Canada) S Diez	3	0
Q	(United States) M Zheng	6	6
(Kazakhstan) D Yevseyev	7	4	5
(Brazil) JL Reis da Silva	5	6	7
(United States) P Kypson	3	0
8	(Canada) A Galarneau	6	6

Second round
WC	(Canada) L Draxl	7^{7}	6
Q	(Northern Mariana Islands) C Sinclair	6^{0}	3
Q	(United States) E Zhu	6	5	2
(Kazakhstan) B Zhukayev	4	7	6
LL	(Romania) M Copil	1	3
Q	(United States) M Zheng	6	6
(Brazil) JL Reis da Silva	6^{2}	0
8	(Canada) A Galarneau	7^{7}	6

Quarterfinals
WC	(Canada) L Draxl	4	3
(Kazakhstan) B Zhukayev	6	6
Q	(United States) M Zheng	6	0	6
8	(Canada) A Galarneau	3	6	3

Semifinals
(Kazakhstan) B Zhukayev	6	3	6^{4}
Q	(United States) M Zheng	3	6	7^{7}

=== Bottom half ===
First round
7	(United States) M Krueger	4	6	6
(Germany) P Gojowczyk	6	4	4
(United States) Christian Langmo	2	4
WC	(Japan) K Nishikori	6	6
PR	(New Zealand) R Statham	6	6^{4}	7
Q	(United States) N Chappell	1	7^{7}	5
(Australia) A Walton	7^{7}	6
3	(Australia) M Polmans	6^{1}	1
5	(Australia) D Sweeny	4	7	6
(Tunisia) S Mansouri	6	5	2
Q	(Australia) B Tomic	7^{9}	6
PR	(Australia) A Bolt	6^{7}	4
Q	(Brazil) G Heide	7^{7}	6
(Australia) T Schoolkate	6^{3}	3
LL	(United States) A Rybakov	7^{7}	6
2	(United States) N Moreno de Alboran	6^{4}	3

Second round
7	(United States) M Krueger	6	3	2
WC	(Japan) K Nishikori	4	6	6
PR	(New Zealand) R Statham	2	0
(Australia) A Walton	6	6
5	(Australia) D Sweeny	4	6^{3}
Q	(Australia) B Tomic	6	7^{7}
Q	(Brazil) G Heide	6	6
LL	(United States) A Rybakov	3	4

Quarterfinals
WC	(Japan) K Nishikori	6	6
(Australia) A Walton	4	2
Q	(Australia) B Tomic	6^{3}	7^{7}	1
Q	(Brazil) G Heide	7^{7}	6^{5}	6

Semifinals
WC	(Japan) K Nishikori	6	6
Q	(Brazil) G Heide	4	2
