= 2023 Caribbean Open – Doubles =

Doubles
- 2023 Caribbean Open

Final
- Champions: (United States) Evan King (United States) Reese Stalder
- Runners-up: (Japan) Toshihide Matsui (Japan) Kaito Uesugi
- Score: 3–6, 7–5, [11–9]

Events
Singles	Doubles
Caribbean Open	· 2024 →

This was the first edition of the tournament.

Evan King and Reese Stalder won the title after defeating Toshihide Matsui and Kaito Uesugi 3–6, 7–5, [11–9] in the final.

== Seeds ==
1. (United States) Evan King / (United States) Reese Stalder (champions)
2. (South Korea) Nam Ji-sung / (New Zealand) Artem Sitak (semifinals)
3. (Japan) Toshihide Matsui / (Japan) Kaito Uesugi (final)
4. (Mexico) Hans Hach Verdugo / (United States) Mitchell Krueger (first round)

== Draw ==
=== Key ===
- Q = Qualifier
- WC = Wild card
- LL = Lucky loser
- Alt = Alternate
- SE = Special exempt
- PR = Protected ranking
- ITF = ITF entry
- JE = Junior exempt
- w/o = Walkover
- r = Retired
- d = Defaulted
- SR = Special ranking

First round
1	(United States) E King (United States) R Stalder	7^{7}	6
(Kazakhstan) D Yevseyev (Kazakhstan) B Zhukayev	6^{1}	2
(United States) A Perez (United States) E Zhu	6	7^{7}
(Australia) T Schoolkate (Australia) A Walton	1	6^{4}
4	(Mexico) H Hach Verdugo (United States) M Krueger	5	6^{2}
(Tunisia) S Mansouri (New Zealand) R Statham	7	7^{7}
(India) RC Bollipalli (Northern Mariana Islands) C Sinclair	7^{7}	4	[10]
(Australia) C Puttergill (Canada) K Stevenson	6^{2}	6	[7]
(United States) N Moreno de Alboran (United States) Nathan Ponwith
WC	(Puerto Rico) Jake Fellows (United States) Noah Hernandez	w/o
(Norway) V Durasovic (France) A Escoffier
3	(Japan) T Matsui (Japan) K Uesugi	w/o
WC	(Puerto Rico) George Bader (Puerto Rico) Alexander Bravo	3	1
Alt	(Brazil) M Alves (Brazil) G Heide	6	6
(Canada) S Diez (Canada) A Galarneau	4	5
2	(South Korea) J-s Nam (New Zealand) A Sitak	6	7

Quarterfinals
1	(United States) E King (United States) R Stalder	6^{4}	6	[10]
(United States) A Perez (United States) E Zhu	7^{7}	1	[1]
(Tunisia) S Mansouri (New Zealand) R Statham	7^{7}	4	[4]
(India) RC Bollipalli (Northern Mariana Islands) C Sinclair	6^{5}	6	[10]
WC	(Puerto Rico) J Fellows (United States) N Hernandez	5	2
3	(Japan) T Matsui (Japan) K Uesugi	7	6
Alt	(Brazil) M Alves (Brazil) G Heide	1	7^{7}	[8]
2	(South Korea) J-s Nam (New Zealand) A Sitak	6	6^{4}	[10]

Semifinals
1	(United States) E King (United States) R Stalder	6^{3}	6	[10]
(India) RC Bollipalli (Northern Mariana Islands) C Sinclair	7^{7}	3	[2]
3	(Japan) T Matsui (Japan) K Uesugi	6	7
2	(South Korea) J-s Nam (New Zealand) A Sitak	4	5

Final
1	(United States) E King (United States) R Stalder	3	7	[11]
3	(Japan) T Matsui (Japan) K Uesugi	6	5	[9]
