= 2024 Torneio Internacional Masculino de Tênis – Doubles =

Doubles
- 2024 Torneio Internacional Masculino de Tênis

Final
- Champions: (Argentina) Federico Agustín Gómez (Venezuela) Luis David Martínez
- Runners-up: (United States) Christian Harrison (United States) Evan King
- Score: 7–6^{(7–4)}, 7–5

Events
Singles	Doubles
Torneio Internacional Masculino de Tênis	· 2025 →

This was the first edition of the tournament.

Federico Agustín Gómez and Luis David Martínez won the title after defeating Christian Harrison and Evan King 7–6^{(7–4)}, 7–5 in the final.

== Seeds ==
1. (Argentina) Guido Andreozzi / (Brazil) Orlando Luz (first round)
2. (United States) Christian Harrison / (United States) Evan King (final)
3. (Bolivia) Boris Arias / (Bolivia) Federico Zeballos (first round)
4. (Brazil) Luís Britto / (Brazil) Fernando Romboli (first round)

== Draw ==
=== Key ===
- Q = Qualifier
- WC = Wild card
- LL = Lucky loser
- Alt = Alternate
- SE = Special exempt
- PR = Protected ranking
- ITF = ITF entry
- JE = Junior exempt
- w/o = Walkover
- r = Retired
- d = Defaulted
- SR = Special ranking

=== Draw ===
First round
1	(Argentina) G Andreozzi (Brazil) O Luz	6^{4}	6^{6}
(Argentina) FA Gómez (Venezuela) LD Martínez	7^{7}	7^{8}
(United Kingdom) S Duncan (United States) H Reese	6	7
WC	(Brazil) João Pedro Gomes Leme (Brazil) Felipe Moretti	2	5
3	(Bolivia) B Arias (Bolivia) F Zeballos	6^{5}	4
(Brazil) M Pucinelli de Almeida (Brazil) Gabriel Roveri Sidney	7^{7}	6
WC	(Brazil) Lucca Acioly (Brazil) João Eduardo Schiessl	6	7^{7}
(Brazil) G Heide (Brazil) F Meligeni Alves	3	6^{4}
PR	(Peru) A Huertas del Pino (Peru) C Huertas del Pino	7^{7}	6
(Ecuador) Á Guillén Meza (Argentina) R Olivo	6^{5}	2
(Switzerland) R Bertola (Lebanon) H Habib	5	7^{7}	[10]
4	(Brazil) L Britto (Brazil) F Romboli	7	6^{5}	[5]
(United Kingdom) J Clarke (Brazil) PA Saraiva dos Santos	6	3	[10]
(Brazil) M Alves (Chile) M Soto	4	6	[12]
(Peru) G Bueno (Brazil) P Sakamoto	6^{4}	4
2	(United States) C Harrison (United States) E King	7^{7}	6

Quarterfinals
(Argentina) FA Gómez (Venezuela) LD Martínez	6	1	[10]
(United Kingdom) S Duncan (United States) H Reese	3	6	[1]
(Brazil) M Pucinelli de Almeida (Brazil) G Roveri Sidney	6	6
WC	(Brazil) L Acioly (Brazil) JE Schiessl	4	2
PR	(Peru) A Huertas del Pino (Peru) C Huertas del Pino	4	3
(Switzerland) R Bertola (Lebanon) H Habib	6	6
(Brazil) M Alves (Chile) M Soto	6^{4}	3
2	(United States) C Harrison (United States) E King	7^{7}	6

Semifinals
(Argentina) FA Gómez (Venezuela) LD Martínez	6	6
(Brazil) M Pucinelli de Almeida (Brazil) G Roveri Sidney	4	4
(Switzerland) R Bertola (Lebanon) H Habib	2	1
2	(United States) C Harrison (United States) E King	6	6

Final
(Argentina) FA Gómez (Venezuela) LD Martínez	7^{7}	7
2	(United States) C Harrison (United States) E King	6^{4}	5
