= Caribbean Open =

- 2023 Caribbean Open

ATP Challenger Tour
- Event name: Caribbean Open
- Location: Palmas del Mar, Puerto Rico
- Category: ATP Challenger 75
- Surface: Hard
- Draw: 32S/16D
- Prize money: US$80,000+H
- Website: Website

Current champions
- Men's singles: (Japan) Kei Nishikori
- Men's doubles: (United States) Evan King (United States) Reese Stalder

The Caribbean Open is a professional tennis tournament played on hard courts. It is currently part of the ATP Challenger Tour. It was first held in Palmas del Mar, Puerto Rico in 2023.

== Past finals ==
=== Singles ===
Year	Champion	Runner-up	Score
2023	(Japan) Kei Nishikori	(United States) Michael Zheng	6–2, 7–5

=== Doubles ===
Year	Champions	Runners-up	Score
2023	(United States) Evan King (United States) Reese Stalder	(Japan) Toshihide Matsui (Japan) Kaito Uesugi	3–6, 7–5, [11–9]
