= 2025 Guangzhou Huangpu International Tennis Open =

- Date: 8–14 September
- Edition: 2nd
- Surface: Hard
- Location: Guangzhou, China

Champions

Singles
- (Argentina) Juan Manuel Cerúndolo

Doubles
- (Australia) Matthew Romios / (United States) Ryan Seggerman
← 2024 ·	Guangzhou Huangpu International Tennis Open	· 2026 →

The 2025 Guangzhou Huangpu International Tennis Open was a professional tennis tournament played on hardcourts. It was the second edition of the tournament which was part of the 2025 ATP Challenger Tour. It took place in Guangzhou, China between 8 and 14 September 2025.

== Singles main-draw entrants ==
=== Seeds ===
Country	Player	Rank^{1}	Seed
AUS	Christopher O'Connell	81	1
ARG	Juan Manuel Cerúndolo	88	2
USA	Nishesh Basavareddy	104	3
GEO	Nikoloz Basilashvili	108	4
~~USA~~	~~Tristan Boyer~~	~~113~~	~~5~~
CHI	Alejandro Tabilo	122	6
GBR	Dan Evans	136	7
GBR	Billy Harris	151	8
JPN	Taro Daniel	166	9

^{1} Rankings are as of 25 August 2025.

=== Other entrants ===
The following players received wildcards into the singles main draw:

- (China) Charles Chen
- (China) Te Rigele
- (China) Xiao Linang

The following player received entry into the singles main draw as an alternate:

- Petr Bar Biryukov

The following players received entry from the qualifying draw:

- (Italy) Alexandr Binda
- (Switzerland) Luca Castelnuovo
- (Japan) Yuta Kikuchi
- (India) Ramkumar Ramanathan
- (Thailand) Kasidit Samrej
- (China) Zhang Tianhui

The following player received entry as a lucky loser:

- (United States) Evan Zhu

== Champions ==
=== Singles ===
- (Argentina) Juan Manuel Cerúndolo def. (Chile) Alejandro Tabilo 6–2, 6–3.

=== Doubles ===
- (Australia) Matthew Romios / (United States) Ryan Seggerman def. (Japan) Kaito Uesugi / (Japan) Seita Watanabe 6–1, 6–3.
