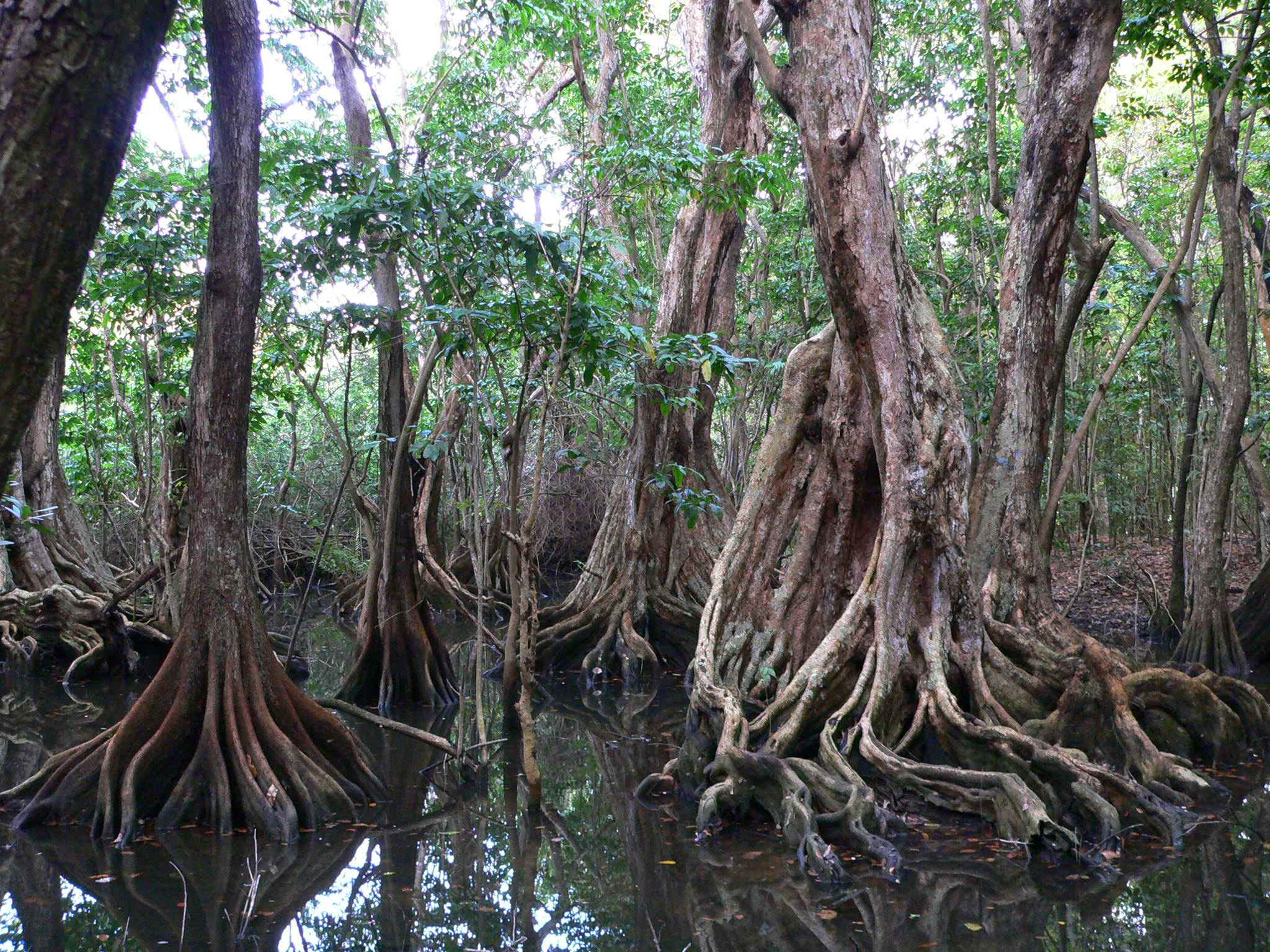
- Stand, with leaves visible on younger specimens
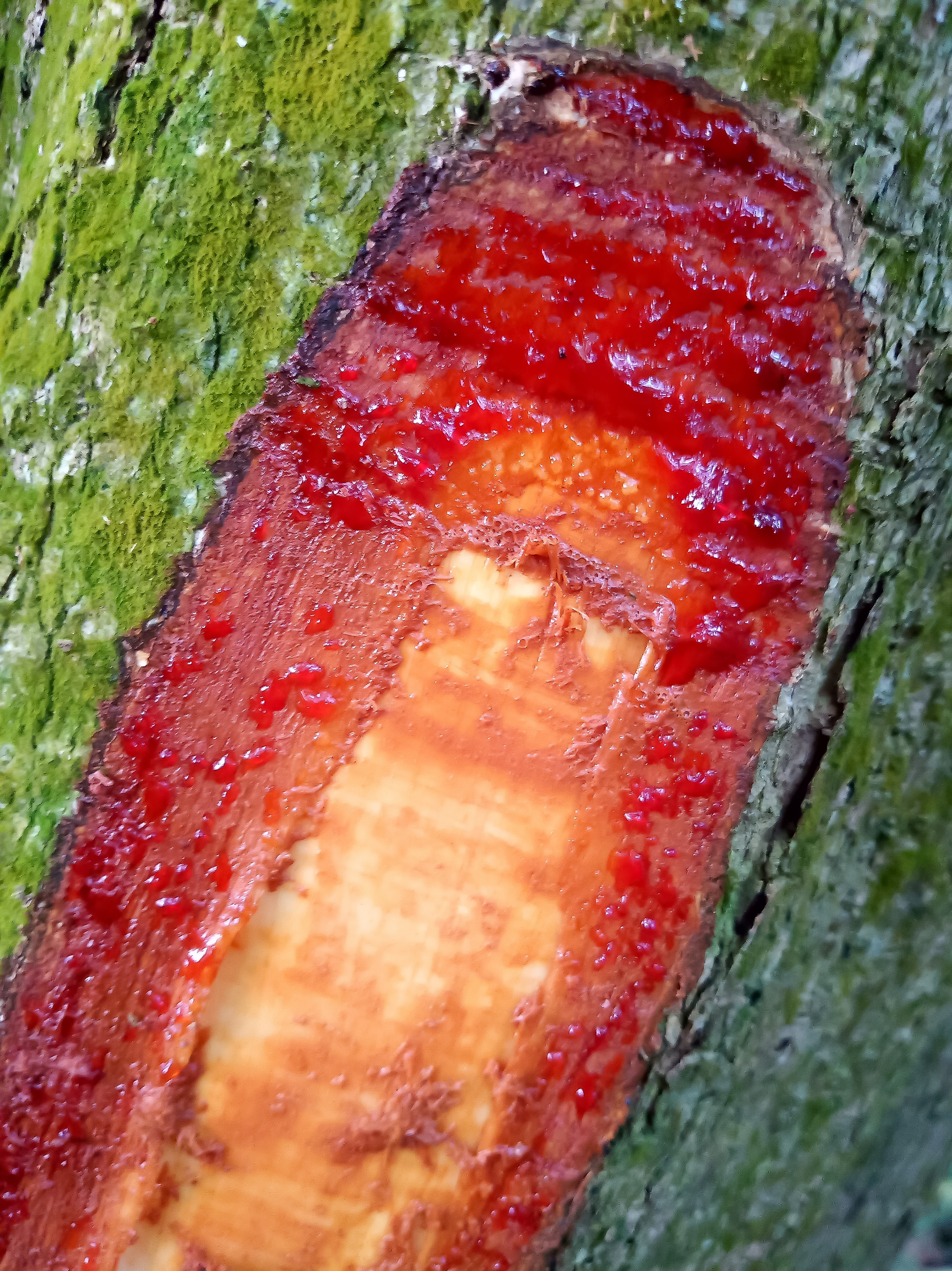
- Wound showing "dragon's blood" sap

Conservation status
- Least Concern (IUCN 3.1)

Scientific classification
- Kingdom: Plantae
- Clade: Embryophytes
- Clade: Tracheophytes
- Clade: Spermatophytes
- Clade: Angiosperms
- Clade: Eudicots
- Clade: Rosids
- Order: Fabales
- Family: Fabaceae
- Subfamily: Faboideae
- Genus: Pterocarpus
- Species: P. officinalis

Binomial name
- Pterocarpus officinalis Jacq.

Synonyms
- List: Lingoum officinale (Jacq.) Kuntze; Moutouchi crispata (DC.) Benth.; Moutouchi draco (L.) Benth.; Moutouchi suberosa Aubl.; Pterocarpus crispatus DC.; Pterocarpus draco L.; Pterocarpus hemipterus Gaertn.; Pterocarpus moutouchi Lam.; Pterocarpus sanguis-draconis Crantz; Pterocarpus suberosus (Aubl.) Pers.

= Pterocarpus officinalis =

Species of flowering plant

Pterocarpus officinalis, the dragonsblood tree, is a species of flowering plant in the family Fabaceae, native to southern Mexico, Central America, the Caribbean, and northern South America. It is typically found in coastal freshwater or slightly brackish habitats, in association with mangroves that occupy the more saline areas. Its timber is commercially traded.
