= 2026 Guangzhou Huangpu International Tennis Open =

- Date: 14–20 September
- Edition: 3rd
- Surface: Hard
- Location: Guangzhou, China

Champions

Singles
- Marat Sharipov

Doubles
- (Australia) Blake Bayldon / (India) Arjun Kadhe
- Guangzhou Huangpu International Tennis Open

The 2026 Guangzhou Huangpu International Tennis Open was a professional tennis tournament played on hardcourts. It was the third edition of the tournament which was part of the 2026 ATP Challenger Tour. It took place in Guangzhou, China between 14 and 20 September 2026.

== Singles main-draw entrants ==
=== Seeds ===
Country	Player	Rank^{1}	Seed
JPN	Shintaro Mochizuki	117	1
GEO	Nikoloz Basilashvili	132	2
RSA	Lloyd Harris	139	3
AUS	Bernard Tomic	179	4
ITA	Federico Cinà	181	5
CAN	Alexis Galarneau	183	6
SWE	Elias Ymer	204	7
JPN	Rio Noguchi	219	8

^{1} Rankings are as of 31 August 2026.

=== Other entrants ===
The following players received wildcards into the singles main draw:

- (China) Wang Aoran
- (China) Xiao Linang
- (China) Zeng Yaojie

The following players received entry from the qualifying draw:

- (Italy) Alexander Binda
- (Australia) Jesse Delaney
- (Japan) Naoya Honda
- (Japan) Yuta Kikuchi
- (Malaysia) Mitsuki Wei Kang Leong
- (Japan) James Trotter

The following player received entry as a lucky loser:

- (Australia) Thomas Fancutt

== Champions ==
=== Singles ===
- Marat Sharipov def. Pavel Kotov 6–0, 6–3.

=== Doubles ===
- (Australia) Blake Bayldon / (India) Arjun Kadhe def. (Mexico) Miguel Ángel Reyes-Varela / (United States) Reese Stalder 7–5, 3–6, [10–7].
