= Marat Sharipov =

Russian tennis player (born 2002)

- Native name: Марат Шарипов
- Country (sports): Russia
- Born: 9 October 2002 (age 24) Cheboksary, Russia
- Height: 1.88 m (6 ft 2 in)
- Plays: Right-handed (two-handed backhand)
- Coach: Stefan Solunac, Aleksa Barbarez
- Prize money: US $207,642

Singles
- Career record: 0–0 (at ATP Tour level, Grand Slam level, and in Davis Cup)
- Career titles: 1 Challenger , 9 ITF
- Highest ranking: No. 223 (26 October 2026)
- Current ranking: No. 223 (26 October 2026)

Doubles
- Career record: 0–0 (at ATP Tour level, Grand Slam level, and in Davis Cup)
- Career titles: 1 Challenger, 11 ITF
- Highest ranking: No. 321 (15 September 2025)
- Current ranking: No. 1,245 (26 October 2026)
- Last updated on: 26 October 2026.

Marat Dzhaudatovich Sharipov (Russian: Марат Джаудатович Шарипов, born 9 October 2002) is a Russian tennis player. He has a career high ATP singles ranking of world No. 223 achieved on 26 October 2026 and a doubles ranking of No. 321 achieved on 15 September 2025.

== Early life ==
Sharipov started playing tennis at the age of six and has been training in Europe since childhood. At the age of 10, he trained in Croatia and Serbia. Starting in January 2023, Sharipov trained at La France Touch Tennis Academy in Agde in France, under the guidance of local coach Julien Varlet.

== Career ==
Marat Sharipov won his first singles Challenger title at the 2026 Guangzhou Huangpu International Tennis Open after defeating compatriot Pavel Kotov in the final.

== ATP Challenger Tour finals ==
=== Singles: 2 (1 title, 1 runner-up) ===
Legend ATP Challenger Tour (1–1)	Finals by surface Hard (1–1)

Result	W–L	Date	Tournament	Tier	Surface	Opponent	Score
Loss	0–1	Sep 2026	Shanghai Challenger, China	Challenger	Hard	Ilya Ivashka	4–6, 6–3, 6–7^{(7–9)}
Win	1–1	Sep 2026	Guangzhou Huangpu Open, China	Challenger	Hard	Pavel Kotov	6–0, 6–3
