= Torneio Internacional Masculino de Tênis =

- 2024 Torneio Internacional Masculino de Tênis

ATP Challenger Tour
- Location: Barueri, São Paulo state, Brazil
- Venue: Alphaville Tênis Clube
- Category: ATP Challenger Tour
- Surface: Hard
- Prize money: $82,000
- Website: Website

The Torneio Internacional Masculino de Tênis is a professional tennis tournament played on hardcourts. It was part of the ATP Challenger Tour and was held in Barueri, São Paulo state, Brazil in 2024. In September 2025, it was held as an ITF-level M25 tournament.

== Past finals ==
=== Singles ===
Year	Champion	Runner-up	Score
2025	Not held as a Challenger		
2024	(Argentina) Francisco Comesaña	(Argentina) Thiago Agustín Tirante	7–5, 4–6, 6–4

=== Doubles ===
Year	Champions	Runners-up	Score
2025	Not held as a Challenger		
2024	(Argentina) Federico Agustín Gómez (Venezuela) Luis David Martínez	(United States) Christian Harrison (United States) Evan King	7–6^{(7–4)}, 7–5
