= Evan King =

American professional tennis player (born 1992)

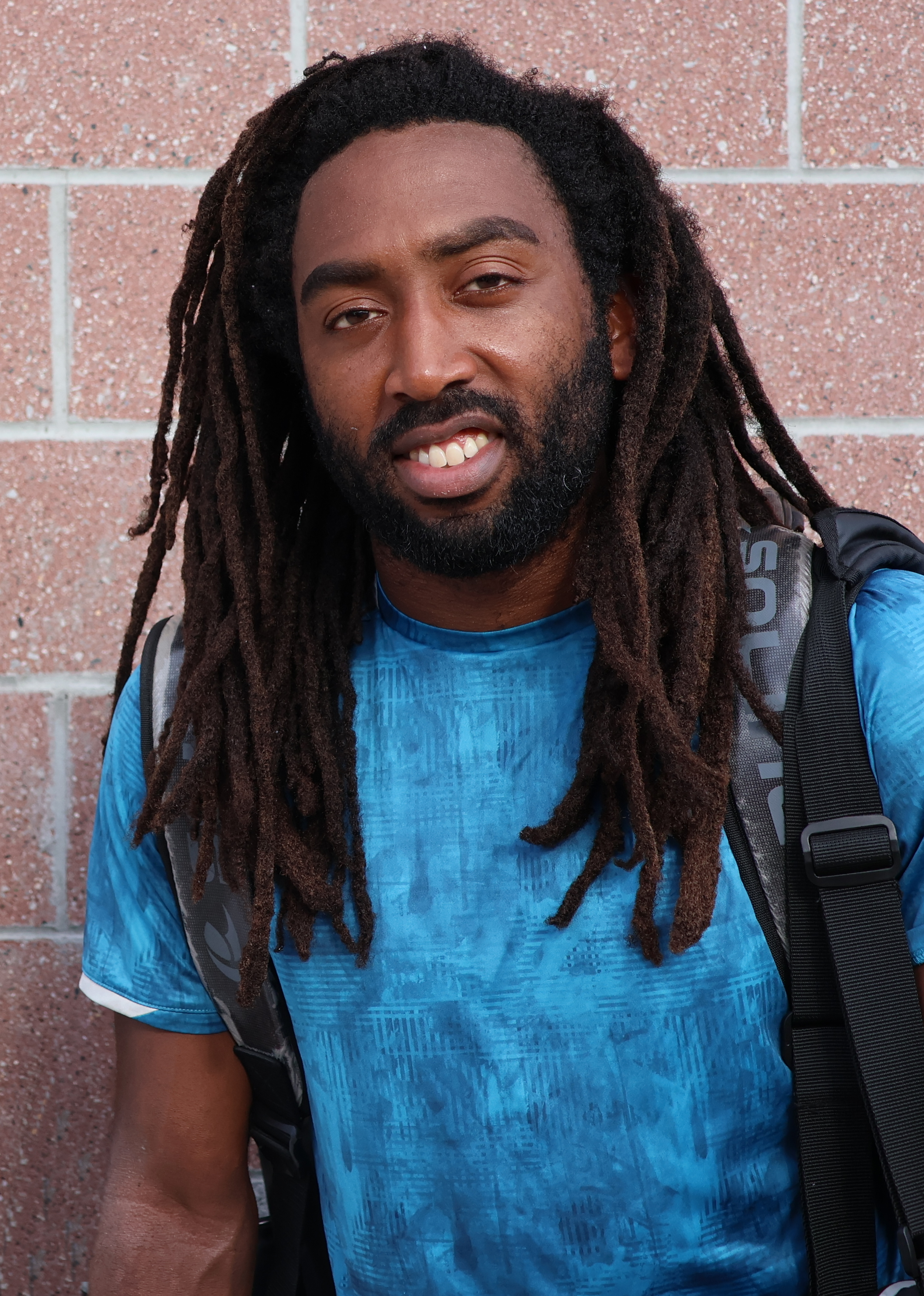
- King at the 2023 Cary Challenger
- Country (sports): United States
- Residence: Chicago, Illinois, US
- Born: March 25, 1992 (age 34) Chicago, Illinois, US
- Height: 6 ft 1 in (1.85 m)
- Turned pro: 2013
- Plays: Left-handed (two-handed backhand)
- College: University of Michigan
- Coach: Hunter Reese, Sean Maymi
- Prize money: US $1,611,873

Singles
- Career record: 1–4
- Career titles: 0
- Highest ranking: No. 185 (April 23, 2018)
- Current ranking: No. 1,724 (August 31, 2026)

Grand Slam singles results
- Australian Open: Q1 (2018)
- French Open: Q1 (2018)
- Wimbledon: Q1 (2018)
- US Open: 1R (2017)

Doubles
- Career record: 66–89
- Career titles: 3
- Highest ranking: No. 14 (February 2, 2026)
- Current ranking: No. 53 (August 31, 2026)

Grand Slam doubles results
- Australian Open: 1R (2024, 2025, 2026)
- French Open: SF (2025)
- Wimbledon: 3R (2024)
- US Open: 3R (2021)

Other doubles tournaments
- Tour Finals: RR (2025)

Grand Slam mixed doubles results
- Australian Open: 2R (2026)
- French Open: F (2025, 2026)
- Wimbledon: 2R (2025, 2026)
- US Open: 1R (2016)
- Last updated on: September 1, 2026.

Evan King (born March 25, 1992) is an American professional tennis player who specializes in doubles. He has a career-high ATP doubles ranking of world No. 14 achieved on 2 February 2026 and a singles ranking of No. 185 achieved on 23 April 2018. His best achievements are at the French Open, reaching the semifinals in 2025 with Christian Harrison and two consecutive mixed doubles finals in 2025 and 2026, partnering with Taylor Townsend and Gabriela Dabrowski, respectively. He has won three ATP Tour doubles titles with Harrison. He also won 24 doubles titles on the ATP Challenger Tour.

== Early life ==
Evan King was born in Chicago on March 25, 1992. He is the son of Evelyn Maxwell and Van King. He is African American. He attended Walter Payton College Prep for two years and played tennis. In 2006, he won five Boys' 16-and-under singles titles, including the USTA National Open and USTA National Winter Championships. In 2007, he was the Illinois State champion in singles. In 2008, he moved to Boca Raton, Florida, to attend the USTA Training Academy, and enrolled in online classes at Laurel Springs School. While in high school, King was featured on the covers of USTA Magazine (April 2008) and RISE Magazine (June 2008), as well as being ranked No. 1 in the USTA 18-and-under category, No. 1 in the TennisRPI list, and the nation’s No. 2 prospect by Tennisrecruiting.net.

== College career ==
Following in his father's footsteps, King attended the University of Michigan. He played on the Wolverine men's tennis team and amassed a 116-34 singles record. He was a three-time ITA All-American (2011, '12, '13), a two-time Big Ten Athlete of the Year (2012, '13), and a four-time All-Big Ten (2010, '11, '12, '13) player. He was Michigan's all-time leader in combined singles and doubles wins with 195 until 2023 when Andrew Fenty surpassed his record. He served as a volunteer assistant during the dual-match portion of the 2014-15 season, and as a volunteer assistant coach in 2015-16.

== Professional career ==
King made his ATP main-draw debut at the 2009 Delray Beach Open as a 17 year old as a wildcard.

At the 2021 US Open he reached the third round of a major for the first time in his career as a wildcard pair partnering fellow American Hunter Reese defeating ninth seeds Łukasz Kubot/Marcelo Melo in the first round and then Austin Krajicek/Dominic Inglot in the second.

Partnering with Christian Harrison, King won his first ATP Tour doubles title at the 2025 Dallas Open, defeating Ariel Behar and Robert Galloway in the final. Within three weeks they lifted their second title, also an ATP 500 in Acapulco, having qualified for the main draw. They defeated fourth seeds Sadio Doumbia and Fabien Reboul 6-4, 6-0 in a 56-minute final.

At the 2025 BNP Paribas Open the pair reached their first Masters semifinal as wildcards with wins over Matthew Ebden and John Peers and seventh-seeded Argentines Maximo Gonzalez and Andres Molteni. As a result King reached a new career-high ranking in the top 30 on 17 March 2025. At the next Masters in Miami, the pair reached back-to-back quarterfinals upsetting third seeds Simone Bolelli and Andrea Vavassori and King reached the top 25 in the rankings on 31 March 2025. The pair reached another semifinal at the 2025 Mutua Madrid Open but again lost, this time to the world No. 1 pair Marcelo Arevalo and Mate Pavic. As a result they both reached new career-high rankings in the top 20 in the rankings on 5 May 2025.

At the 2025 French Open, King reached the semifinals with Christian Harrison in doubles, and the final with Taylor Townsend in mixed doubles.

== World TeamTennis ==
King has played two seasons with World TeamTennis starting in 2018 when he debuted in the league with the Orange County Breakers. In 2019 he joined the expansion Orlando Storm for their inaugural season. It was announced that he will join his hometown expansion team the Chicago Smash during the 2020 season set to begin July 12.

King paired up with Rajeev Ram multiple times throughout the 2020 season in men's doubles. The Smash were seeded second in the WTT Playoffs and defeated the Orlando Storm for a spot in the final, where they ultimately fell to the New York Empire.

== Performance timeline ==
Key
| W | F | SF | QF | #R | RR | Q# | DNQ | A | NH |

(W) winner; (F) finalist; (SF) semifinalist; (QF) quarterfinalist; (#R) rounds 4, 3, 2, 1; (RR) round-robin stage; (Q#) qualification round; (DNQ) did not qualify; (A) absent; (NH) not held; (SR) strike rate (events won / competed); (W–L) win–loss record.
To avoid confusion and double counting, these charts are updated at the conclusion of a tournament or when the player's participation has ended.

=== Doubles ===
Current through the 2026 French Open.

| Tournament | 2018 | 2019 | 2020 | 2021 | 2022 | 2023 | 2024 | 2025 | 2026 | SR | W–L | Win % |
|---|---|---|---|---|---|---|---|---|---|---|---|---|
Grand Slam tournaments
| Australian Open | A | A | A | A | A | A | 1R | 1R | 1R | 0 / 3 | 0–3 | 0% |
| French Open | A | A | A | A | A | A | 2R | SF | 3R | 0 / 3 | 7–3 | 70% |
| Wimbledon | A | A | NH | A | A | A | 3R | 1R | | 0 / 2 | 2–2 | 50% |
| US Open | 1R | 2R | A | 3R | A | A | 1R | 1R | | 0 / 5 | 3–5 | 38% |
| Win–loss | 0–1 | 1–1 | 0–0 | 2–1 | 0–0 | 0–0 | 3–4 | 4–4 | 2–2 | 0 / 13 | 12–13 | 48% |
ATP Masters 1000
| Indian Wells Masters | A | A | NH | A | A | A | A | SF | | 0 / 1 | 3–1 | 75% |
| Miami Open | A | A | NH | A | A | A | A | QF | QF | 0 / 1 | 2–1 | 67% |
| Monte Carlo Masters | A | A | NH | A | A | A | A | 1R | | 0 / 1 | 0–1 | 0% |
| Madrid Open | A | A | NH | A | A | A | A | SF | | 0 / 1 | 3-1 | 75% |
| Italian Open | A | A | A | A | A | A | A | QF | | 0 / 1 | 2–1 | 67% |
| Canadian Open | A | A | NH | A | A | A | A | 1R | | 0 / 1 | 0–1 | 0% |
| Cincinnati Masters | A | A | A | A | A | A | A | QF | | 0 / 1 | 2–1 | 67% |
| Shanghai Masters | A | A | NH | | | A | A | 2R | | 0 / 1 | 1–1 | 50% |
| Paris Masters | A | A | A | A | A | A | A | 1R | | 0 / 1 | 0–1 | – |
| Win–loss | 0–0 | 0–0 | 0–0 | 0–0 | 0–0 | 0–0 | 0–0 | 13–9 | 0–0 | 0 / 9 | 13–9 | 59% |

== Grand Slam tournament finals ==
=== Mixed doubles: 2 (2 runner-ups) ===
| Result | Year | Tournament | Surface | Partner | Opponents | Score |
|---|---|---|---|---|---|---|
| Loss | 2025 | French Open | Clay | (United States) Taylor Townsend | (Italy) Sara Errani (Italy) Andrea Vavassori | 4–6, 2–6 |
| Loss | 2026 | French Open | Clay | (Canada) Gabriela Dabrowski | (Italy) Sara Errani (Italy) Andrea Vavassori | 6–4, 3–6, [4–10] |

== ATP Tour finals ==
=== Doubles: 4 (3 titles, 2 runner-ups) ===
| Legend Grand Slam (–) ATP Finals (–) ATP 1000 (–) ATP 500 (2–0) ATP 250 (1–2) | Finals by surface Hard (3–1) Clay (–) Grass (0–1) | Finals by setting Outdoor (1–2) Indoor (2–0) |

| Result | W–L | Date | Tournament | Tier | Surface | Partner | Opponents | Score |
|---|---|---|---|---|---|---|---|---|
| Win | 1–0 | Feb 2025 | Dallas Open, US | ATP 500 | Hard (i) | (United States) Christian Harrison | (Uruguay) Ariel Behar (United States) Robert Galloway | 7–6^{(7–4)}, 7–6^{(7–4)} |
| Loss | 1–1 | Feb 2025 | Delray Beach Open, US | ATP 250 | Hard | (United States) Christian Harrison | (Serbia) Miomir Kecmanovic (United States) Brandon Nakashima | 6–7^{(3–7)}, 6–1, [3–10] |
| Win | 2–1 | Feb 2025 | Mexican Open, Mexico | ATP 500 | Hard | (United States) Christian Harrison | (France) Sadio Doumbia (France) Fabien Reboul | 6–4, 6–0 |
| Win | 3–1 | Oct 2025 | European Open, Belgium | ATP 250 | Hard (i) | (United States) Christian Harrison | (Monaco) Hugo Nys (France) Édouard Roger-Vasselin | 7–6^{(12–10)}, 7–6^{(7–5)} |
| Loss | 3–6 | Jun 2026 | Mallorca Championships, Spain | ATP 250 | Grass | (Sweden) André Göransson | (France) Théo Arribagé (France) Albano Olivetti | 6–7^{(6–8)}, 6–3, [9–11] |

== ATP Challenger and ITF Tour finals ==
=== Singles: 11 (6 titles, 5 runner-ups) ===
| Legend ATP Challenger Tour (–) ITF Futures (6–5) | Finals by surface Hard (4–3) Clay (2–2) |

| Result | W–L | Date | Tournament | Tier | Surface | Opponent | Score |
|---|---|---|---|---|---|---|---|
| Loss | 0–1 | Aug 2011 | US F22, Edwardsville | Futures | Hard | (United States) Blake Strode | 6–7^{(4–7)}, 3–6 |
| Loss | 0–2 | Oct 2013 | US F26, Houston | Futures | Hard | (United States) Jeff Dadamo | 3–6, 1–6 |
| Win | 1–2 | Jun 2015 | Zimbabwe F1, Harare | Futures | Hard | (United States) Tyler Hochwalt | 6–4, 7–5 |
| Loss | 1–3 | Jul 2015 | Zimbabwe F3, Harare | Futures | Hard | (South Africa) Tucker Vorster | 1–6, 6–3, 3–6 |
| Win | 2–3 | Aug 2015 | US F23, Edwardsville | Futures | Hard | (United States) Clay Thompson | 6–4, 6–3 |
| Win | 3–3 | Nov 2015 | US F31, Birmingham | Futures | Clay | (Austria) Bastian Trinker | 6–4, 6–4 |
| Win | 4–3 | Jun 2016 | Japan F7, Tokyo | Futures | Hard | (Japan) Sho Katayama | 6–2, 7–6^{(7–1)} |
| Win | 5–3 | Jun 2016 | US F19, Buffalo | Futures | Clay | (Australia) Gavin van Peperzeel | 7–6^{(7–4)}, 6–3 |
| Loss | 5–4 | Dec 2016 | Dom. Republic F1, Santiago de los Caballeros | Futures | Clay | (Brazil) Bruno Sant'anna | 5–7, 3–6 |
| Win | 6–4 | Dec 2016 | Dom. Republic F3, Santo Domingo Este | Futures | Hard | (France) Calvin Hemery | 6–4, 7–6^{(11–9)} |
| Loss | 6–5 | Jun 2017 | Bosnia & Herzegovina F2, Brčko | Futures | Clay | (Bosnia and Herzegovina) Tomislav Brkić | 6–7^{(7–9)}, 3–6 |

=== Doubles: 75 (46–29) ===
| Legend ATP Challenger Tour (24–19) ITF Futures Tour (22–10) | Finals by surface Hard (35–21) Clay (11–7) Carpet (0–1) |

| Result | W–L | Date | Tournament | Tier | Surface | Partner | Opponents | Score |
|---|---|---|---|---|---|---|---|---|
| Win | 1–0 | Aug 2010 | USA F20, Godfrey | Futures | Hard | (United States) Jordan Cox | (South Africa) Jean Andersen (United States) Joshua Zavala | 4–6, 6–3, [12–10] |
| Loss | 1–1 | Oct 2011 | USA F28, Birmingham | Futures | Clay | (United States) Sekou Bangoura | (Romania) Andrei Dăescu (Canada) Milan Pokrajac | 2–6, 2–6 |
| Win | 2–1 | Aug 2012 | Canada F5, Mississauga | Futures | Hard | (United States) Jason Jung | (Canada) Kamil Pajkowski (Canada) Milan Pokrajac | 6–4, 6–2 |
| Win | 3–1 | Jul 2013 | USA F20, Godfrey | Futures | Hard | (United States) Peter Kobelt | (United States) Marcos Giron (United States) Devin McCarthy | 7–5, 6–2 |
| Win | 4–1 | Sep 2013 | Canada F8, Toronto | Futures | Hard | (United States) Jason Jung | (Canada) Milan Pokrajac (Canada) Peter Polansky | 7–5, 6–2 |
| Win | 5–1 | Sep 2013 | Canada F9, Markham | Futures | Hard (i) | (United States) Sekou Bangoura | (Mexico) Hans Hach (Canada) Andrew Ochotta | 6–3, 6–2 |
| Loss | 5–2 | Oct 2013 | USA F26, Houston | Futures | Hard | (Romania) Costin Pavăl | (India) Vijayant Malik (India) Sanam Singh | 6–7^{(5–7)}, 4–6 |
| Loss | 5–3 | Oct 2013 | USA F28, Birmingham | Futures | Clay | (United States) Sekou Bangoura | (France) Romain Arneodo (Monaco) Benjamin Balleret | 7–6^{(7–4)}, 4–6, [7–10] |
| Win | 6–3 | Jan 2014 | USA F2, Sunrise | Futures | Clay | (United States) Jason Jung | (United States) William Blumberg (United States) Francis Tiafoe | 6–7^{(4–7)}, 6–4, [10–6] |
| Loss | 6–4 | Jan 2014 | USA F3, Weston | Futures | Clay | (United States) Jason Jung | (Sweden) Markus Eriksson (Sweden) Milos Sekulic | 7–6^{(7–5)}, 6–7^{(4–7)}, [15–17] |
| Win | 7–4 | Mar 2014 | USA F8, Bakersfield | Futures | Hard | (United States) Sekou Bangoura | (Poland) Adam Chadaj (Czech Republic) Marek Michalička | 5–7, 6–4, [10–5] |
| Win | 8–4 | Mar 2014 | USA F9, Calabasas | Futures | Hard | (United States) Sekou Bangoura | (United States) Dennis Novikov (United States) Connor Smith | 6–4, 6–4 |
| Win | 9–4 | Apr 2014 | USA F10, Harlingen | Futures | Hard | (United States) Devin McCarthy | (United Kingdom) Edward Corrie (United Kingdom) Daniel Smethurst | 6–3, 7–6^{(7–2)} |
| Loss | 9–5 | Jun 2014 | Tianjin, China, P.R. | Challenger | Hard | (United States) Jason Jung | (Germany) Robin Kern (France) Josselin Ouanna | 7–6^{(7–3)}, 5–7, [8–10] |
| Loss | 9–6 | Jul 2014 | Winnetka, USA | Challenger | Hard | (United States) Raymond Sarmiento | (Australia) Thanasi Kokkinakis (United States) Denis Kudla | 2–6, 6–7^{(4–7)} |
| Win | 10–6 | Sep 2014 | Canada F9, Toronto | Futures | Clay | (United States) Sekou Bangoura | (United States) Bjorn Fratangelo (United States) Mitchell Krueger | 6–4, 4–6, [11–9] |
| Loss | 10–7 | Oct 2014 | USA F27, Houston | Futures | Hard | (United States) Jeff Dadamo | (Brazil) Henrique Cunha (Bulgaria) Dimitar Kutrovsky | 4–6, 4–6 |
| Win | 11–7 | Jun 2015 | Mozambique F2, Maputo | Futures | Hard | (United States) Anderson Reed | (Uganda) Duncan Mugabe (Burundi) Hassan Ndayishimiye | 6–3, 6–2 |
| Loss | 11–8 | Jun 2015 | Zimbabwe F1, Harare | Futures | Hard | (United States) Anderson Reed | (South Africa) Lloyd Harris (South Africa) Nicolaas Scholtz | 5–7, 4–6 |
| Win | 12–8 | Jul 2015 | Zimbabwe F3, Harare | Futures | Hard | (United States) Anderson Reed | (Zimbabwe) Benjamin Lock (Zimbabwe) Courtney John Lock | 4–6, 6–4, [10–7] |
| Win | 13–8 | Aug 2015 | USA F24, Decatur | Futures | Hard | (United States) Kevin King | (France) Grégoire Barrère (France) Tom Jomby | 6–0, 6–2 |
| Loss | 13–9 | Aug 2015 | USA F25, Champaign | Futures | Hard | (United States) Kevin King | (United States) Justin S. Shane (United States) Ryan Shane | 1–6, 6–7^{(4–7)} |
| Loss | 13–10 | Sep 2015 | France F19, Plaisir | Futures | Hard (i) | (United States) Anderson Reed | (Netherlands) Sander Arends (Poland) Adam Majchrowicz | 4–6, 4–6 |
| Win | 14–10 | Jan 2016 | USA F1, Los Angeles | Futures | Hard | (United States) Raymond Sarmiento | (United States) Jean-Yves Aubone (United States) Dennis Nevolo | 6–4, 3–6, [11–9] |
| Loss | 14–11 | Jan 2016 | USA F2, Long Beach | Futures | Hard | (United States) Raymond Sarmiento | (Republic of Ireland) David O'Hare (United Kingdom) Joe Salisbury | 3–6, 6–7^{(4–7)} |
| Win | 15–11 | Oct 2016 | Monterrey, Mexico | Challenger | Hard | (United States) Denis Kudla | (Australia) Jarryd Chaplin (New Zealand) Ben McLachlan | 6–7^{(4–7)}, 6–4, [10–2] |
| Win | 16–11 | Oct 2016 | USA F32, Harlingen | Futures | Hard | (United Kingdom) Luke Bambridge | (United States) John McNally (United States) Evan Zhu | 6–4, 6–4 |
| Loss | 16–12 | Dec 2016 | Dominican Republic F1, Santiago de los Caballeros | Futures | Clay | (United States) Hunter Reese | (Brazil) Eduardo Dischinger (Brazil) Bruno Sant'anna | 3–6, 6–7^{(4–7)} |
| Win | 17–12 | Dec 2016 | Dominican Republic F3, Santo Domingo Este | Futures | Hard | (United States) Alexios Halebian | (Serbia) Nebojša Perić (Serbia) Ilija Vučić | 6–4, 6–4 |
| Win | 18–12 | Feb 2017 | Indonesia F2, Jakarta | Futures | Hard | (United States) Nathan Pasha | (Japan) Soichiro Moritani (Japan) Masato Shiga | 6–3, 6–7^{(8–10)}, [10–6] |
| Win | 19–12 | Mar 2017 | Australia F2, Canberra | Futures | Clay | (United States) Nathan Pasha | (Australia) Maverick Banes (Australia) Gavin van Peperzeel | 4–6, 6–3, [10–4] |
| Win | 20–12 | Apr 2017 | USA F14, Orange Park | Futures | Clay | (United States) Hunter Reese | (Australia) Daniel Nolan (Japan) Yosuke Watanuki | 2–6, 7–5, [10–8] |
| Win | 21–12 | Jun 2017 | Spain F17, Martos | Futures | Hard | (United States) Robert Galloway | (United States) JC Aragone (Australia) Daniel Nolan | 6–4, 6–4 |
| Win | 22–12 | Jul 2017 | Netherlands F3, Middelburg | Futures | Clay | (United States) Hunter Reese | (Netherlands) Michiel de Krom (Netherlands) Sem Verbeek | 6–2, 6–1 |
| Loss | 22–13 | Aug 2017 | Floridablanca, Colombia | Challenger | Clay | (United States) Sekou Bangoura | (Peru) Sergio Galdós (Chile) Nicolás Jarry | 3–6, 7–5, [1–10] |
| Win | 23–13 | Oct 2017 | Monterrey, Mexico | Challenger | Hard | (United States) Christopher Eubanks | (El Salvador) Marcelo Arevalo (Mexico) Miguel Angel Reyes-Varela | 7–6^{(7–4)}, 6–3 |
| Loss | 23–14 | Oct 2017 | Traralgon, Australia | Challenger | Hard | (United States) Nathan Pasha | (Australia) Alex Bolt (Australia) Bradley Mousley | 4–6, 2–6 |
| Win | 24–14 | Dec 2017 | Hong Kong F5, Hong Kong | Futures | Hard | (United States) Michael Zhu | (France) Corentin Denolly (Japan) Takuto Niki | 6–4, 6–2 |
| Loss | 24–15 | Feb 2018 | Burnie, Australia | Challenger | Hard | (United States) Max Schnur | (Spain) Marcel Granollers (Spain) Gerard Granollers-Pujol | 6–7^{(8–10)}, 2–6 |
| Loss | 24–16 | Feb 2018 | Morelos, Mexico | Challenger | Hard | (United States) Nathan Pasha | (Venezuela) Roberto Maytín (Brazil) Fernando Romboli | 5–7, 3–6 |
| Loss | 24–17 | Mar 2018 | Indian Wells, USA | Challenger | Hard | (United States) Nathan Pasha | (United States) Austin Krajicek (United States) Jackson Withrow | 7–6^{(7–3)}, 1–6, [9–11] |
| Win | 25–17 | Apr 2018 | Sarasota, USA | Challenger | Clay | (United States) Hunter Reese | (United States) Christian Harrison (Canada) Peter Polansky | 6–1, 6–2 |
| Win | 26–17 | Sep 2018 | Cary, USA | Challenger | Hard | (United States) Hunter Reese | (France) Fabrice Martin (France) Hugo Nys | 6–4, 7–6^{(8–6)} |
| Win | 27–17 | Apr 2019 | Monterrey, Mexico | Challenger | Hard | (United States) Nathan Pasha | (Mexico) Santiago González (Pakistan) Aisam Qureshi | 7–5, 6–2 |
| Loss | 27–18 | May 2019 | Jerusalem, Israel | Challenger | Hard | (Italy) Julian Ocleppo | (Uruguay) Ariel Behar (Ecuador) Gonzalo Escobar | 4–6, 6–7^{(5–7)} |
| Win | 28–18 | Jun 2019 | Fergana, Uzbekistan | Challenger | Hard | (United States) Hunter Reese | (Serbia) Nikola Čačić (Chinese Taipei) Yang Tsung-hua | 6–3, 5–7, [10–4] |
| Loss | 28–19 | Sep 2019 | Kaohsiung, Taiwan | Challenger | Carpet | (United States) Hunter Reese | (Chinese Taipei) Hsieh Cheng-peng (Chinese Taipei) Yang Tsung-hua | 4–6, 6–7^{(4–7)} |
| Loss | 28–20 | Nov 2019 | Playford, Australia | Challenger | Hard | (Philippines) Ruben Gonzales | (Finland) Harri Heliövaara (Finland) Patrik Niklas-Salminen | 4–6, 7–6^{(7–4)}, [7–10] |
| Win | 29–20 | Feb 2020 | Launceston, Australia | Challenger | Hard | (Zimbabwe) Benjamin Lock | (Belgium) Kimmer Coppejans (Spain) Sergio Martos Gornés | 3–6, 6–3, [10–8] |
| Loss | 29–21 | Mar 2021 | Cleveland, USA | Challenger | Hard (i) | (United States) Hunter Reese | (United States) Robert Galloway (United States) Alex Lawson | 5-7, 7-6^{(7-5)}, [9-11] |
| Win | 30–21 | May 2021 | Zagreb, Croatia | Challenger | Clay | (United States) Hunter Reese | (Kazakhstan) Andrey Golubev (Kazakhstan) Aleksandr Nedovyesov | 6–2, 7–6^{(7–4)} |
| Win | 31–21 | May 2021 | Biella, Italy | Challenger | Clay | (Germany) Julian Lenz | (Poland) Karol Drzewiecki (Spain) Sergio Martos Gornés | 3–6, 6–3, [11–9] |
| Loss | 31–22 | Oct 2021 | Santiago, Chile | Challenger | Clay | (United States) Max Schnur | (Ecuador) Diego Hidalgo (Chile) Nicolás Jarry | 3-6, 7-5, [6-10] |
| Win | 32–22 | Oct 2021 | Santiago, Chile | Challenger | Clay | (United States) Max Schnur | (Mexico) Hans Hach Verdugo (Mexico) Miguel Ángel Reyes-Varela | 3–6, 7–6^{(7–3)}, [16–14] |
| Loss | 32–23 | Oct 2021 | Las Vegas, USA | Challenger | Hard | (Chinese Taipei) Jason Jung | (United States) William Blumberg (United States) Max Schnur | 5-7, 7–6^{(7–5)}, [5-10] |
| Win | 33–23 | May 2022 | Troisdorf, Germany | Challenger | Clay | (Jamaica) Dustin Brown | (Germany) Hendrik Jebens (Poland) Piotr Matuszewski | 6-4, 7-5 |
| Loss | 33–24 | Aug 2022 | Chicago, USA | Challenger | Hard | (United States) Mitchell Krueger | (Sweden) André Göransson (Japan) Ben McLachlan | 4–6, 7–6^{(7–3)}, [5–10] |
| Win | 34–24 | Nov 2022 | Maspalomas, Spain | Challenger | Clay | (United States) Reese Stalder | (Italy) Marco Bortolotti (Spain) Sergio Martos Gornés | 6–3, 5–7, [11–9] |
| Loss | 34–25 | Feb 2023 | Waco, USA | Challenger | Hard | (United States) Mitchell Krueger | (Serbia) Ivan Sabanov (Serbia) Matej Sabanov | 1–6, 6–3, [10–12] |
| Loss | 34–26 | Mar 2023 | Mexico City, Mexico | Challenger | Clay | (United States) Reese Stalder | (Bolivia) Boris Arias (Bolivia) Federico Zeballos | 5–7, 7–5, [2–10] |
| Win | 35–26 | May 2023 | Gwangju, South Korea | Challenger | Hard | (United States) Reese Stalder | (Australia) Andrew Harris (Australia) John-Patrick Smith | 6–4, 6–2 |
| Win | 36–26 | May 2023 | Busan, South Korea | Challenger | Hard | (United States) Reese Stalder | (Australia) Max Purcell (New Zealand) Rubin Statham | w/o |
| Loss | 36–27 | Jun 2023 | Tyler, United States | Challenger | Hard | (United States) Reese Stalder | (Australia) Alex Bolt (Australia) Andrew Harris | 1–6, 4–6 |
| Win | 37–27 | Jun 2023 | Palmas del Mar, Puerto Rico | Challenger | Hard | (United States) Reese Stalder | (Japan) Toshihide Matsui (Japan) Kaito Uesugi | 3–6, 7–5, [11–9] |
| Win | 38–27 | Aug 2023 | Cary, United States | Challenger | Hard | (United States) Reese Stalder | (Latvia) Miķelis Lībietis (Australia) Adam Walton | 6–3, 7–6^{(7–4)} |
| Win | 39–27 | Oct 2023 | Fairfield, United States | Challenger | Hard | (United States) Reese Stalder | (United States) Vasil Kirkov (United States) Denis Kudla | 7–5, 6–3 |
| Win | 40–27 | Nov 2023 | Bergamo, Italy | Challenger | Hard | (United States) Brandon Nakashima | (Portugal) Francisco Cabral (United Kingdom) Henry Patten | 6–4, 7–6^{(7–1)} |
| Win | 41–27 | Nov 2023 | Kobe, Japan | Challenger | Hard | (United States) Reese Stalder | (South Korea) Nam Ji-sung (Australia) Andrew Harris | 7–6^{(7–3)}, 2–6, [10–7] |
| Win | 42–27 | Nov 2023 | Yokkaichi, Japan | Challenger | Hard | (United States) Reese Stalder | (Chinese Taipei) Ray Ho (Australia) Calum Puttergill | 7–5, 6–4 |
| Win | 43–27 | June 2024 | Ilkley, United Kingdom | Challenger | Hard | (United States) Reese Stalder | (United States) Christian Harrison (France) Fabrice Martin | 6–3, 3–6, [10–6] |
| Win | 44–27 | Sep 2024 | Guangzhou, China | Challenger | Hard | (United States) Reese Stalder | (Philippines) Francis Alcantara (Thailand) Pruchya Isaro | 4–6, 7–5, [10–5] |
| Win | 45–27 | Nov 2024 | Champaign, US | Challenger | Hard (i) | (United States) Reese Stalder | (United Kingdom) James Davis (United Kingdom) James MacKinlay | 7–6^{(7–3)}, 7–5 |
| Loss | 45–28 | Nov 2024 | São Paulo, Brazil | Challenger | Hard | (United States) Christian Harrison | (Argentina) Federico Agustín Gómez (Venezuela) Luis David Martínez | 6–7^{(4–7)}, 5–7 |
| Win | 46–28 | Nov 2024 | Temuco, Chile | Challenger | Hard | (United States) Christian Harrison | (Zimbabwe) Benjamin Lock (Argentina) Renzo Olivo | 7–6^{(7–5)}, 7–5. |
| Loss | 46–29 | Oct 2026 | Brest, France | Challenger | Hard (i) | (India) Sriram Balaji | (Ecuador) Gonzalo Escobar (India) Niki Kaliyanda Poonacha | 6–7^{(4–7)}, 7–6^{(7–5)}, [7–10] |
