= Reese Stalder =

American tennis player (born 1996)

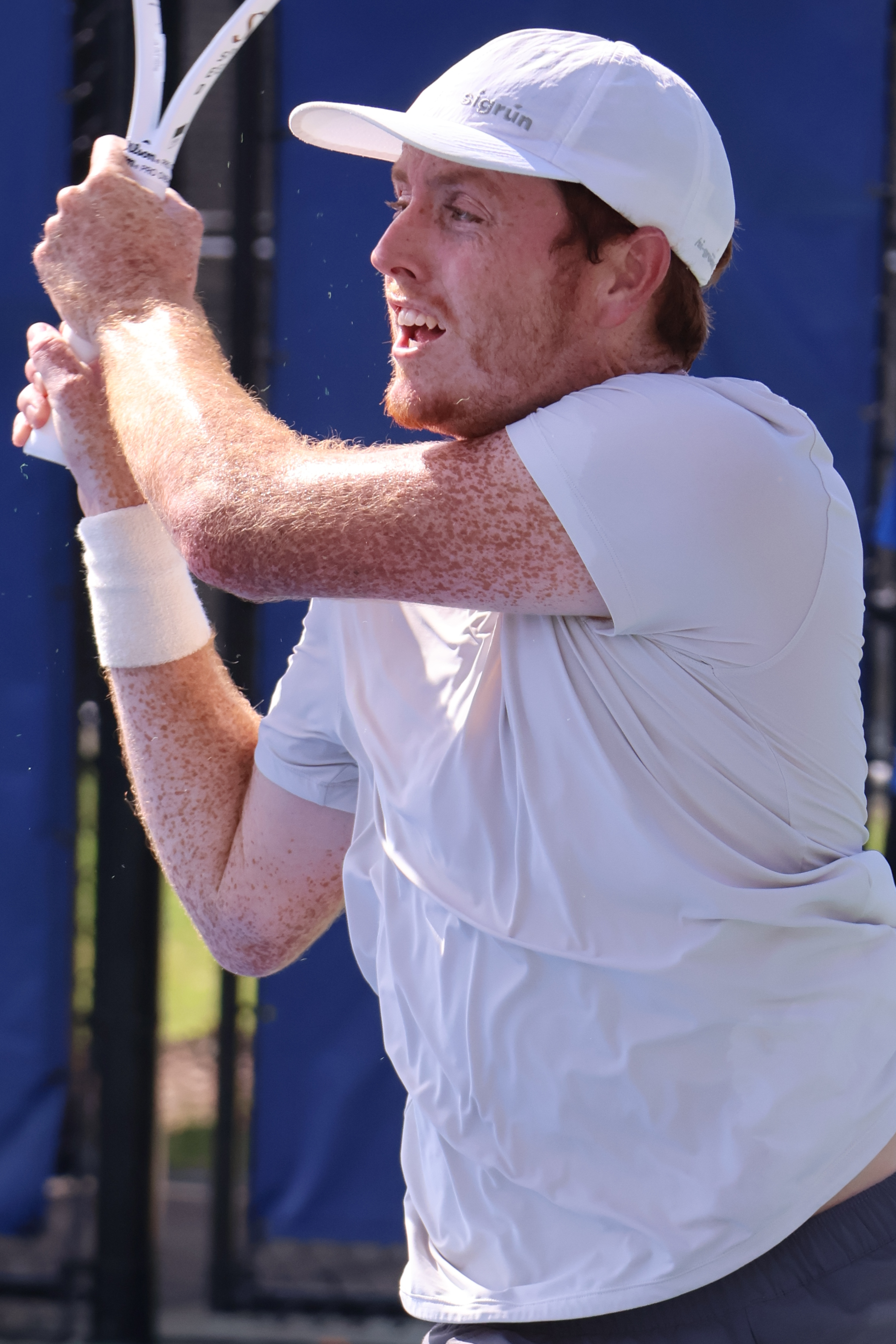
- Stalder at the 2023 Cary Challenger
- Country (sports): United States
- Residence: Costa Mesa, United States
- Born: November 12, 1996 (age 29) Newport Beach, United States
- Height: 1.83 m (6 ft 0 in)
- Turned pro: 2019
- Plays: Right-handed (two-handed backhand)
- College: TCU
- Prize money: US$ 304,176

Singles
- Career record: 0–0
- Career titles: 0
- Highest ranking: No. 956 (June 28, 2021)

Doubles
- Career record: 18–32
- Career titles: 17 Challenger
- Highest ranking: No. 60 (December 4, 2023)
- Current ranking: No. 96 (March 2, 2026)

Grand Slam doubles results
- Australian Open: 1R (2024)
- French Open: 1R (2024, 2026)
- Wimbledon: 3R (2023)
- US Open: 1R (2024, 2025)
- Last updated on: March 10, 2026.

Reese Stalder (born November 12, 1996) is an American professional tennis player who specializes in doubles. He has a career-high ATP doubles ranking of No. 60, achieved on December 4, 2023. He also reached a best singles ranking of No. 956 in June 2021. Stalder has won 16 doubles titles on the ATP Challenger Tour.

== Career ==
Stalder played college tennis at Texas Christian University.

=== 2021: Maiden Challenger title ===
Stalder won his maiden Challenger doubles title at the 2021 Puerto Vallarta Open with Gijs Brouwer.

=== 2023-24: ATP, top 100 & Major debut & third round ===
Stalder made his ATP doubles debut at the 2023 Delray Beach Open where he reached the semifinals partnering 2023 Australian Open winner Rinky Hijikata and defeating second seeded pair of Jamie Murray and Michael Venus in the quarterfinals. He reached the final defeating Mexican duo Hans Hach Verdugo and Miguel Ángel Reyes-Varela. As a result, he moved into the top 110 at a new career high on February 20, 2023. He moved into the top 100 on May 8, 2023, following two Challenger titles in May.

Stalder made his Grand Slam debut at the 2023 Wimbledon Championships as an alternate pair with David Pel and reached the third round. He made his main draw debut at the 2024 French Open partnering Sem Verbeek as an alternate pair, but lost to alternate pair Balaji/Reyes-Varela.

== ATP Tour finals ==
=== Doubles: 1 (runner-up) ===
Legend Grand Slam (0–0) ATP 1000 (0–0) ATP 500 (0–0) ATP 250 (0–1)	Finals by surface Hard (0–1) Clay (0–0) Grass (0–0)	Finals by setting Outdoor (0–1) Indoor (0–0)

Result	W–L	Date	Tournament	Tier	Surface	Partner	Opponents	Score
Loss	0–1	Feb 2023	Delray Beach Open, US	ATP 250	Hard	(Australia) Rinky Hijikata	(El Salvador) Marcelo Arévalo (Netherlands) Jean-Julien Rojer	3–6, 4–6

== ATP Challenger and ITF Tour finals ==
=== Doubles: 41 (24 titles, 17 runner-ups) ===
Legend ATP Challenger Tour (17–15) ITF Futures/WTT (7–2)	Finals by surface Hard (20–14) Clay (3–2) Grass (1–1)

Result	W–L	Date	Tournament	Tier	Surface	Partner	Opponents	Score
Loss	0–1	Aug 2021	Lexington Challenger, US	Challenger	Hard	(United States) Alex Rybakov	(Canada) Liam Draxl (United States) Stefan Kozlov	2–6 7–6^{(7–5)}, [7–10]
Win	1–1	Nov 2021	Puerto Vallarta Open, Mexico	Challenger	Hard	(Netherlands) Gijs Brouwer	(Mexico) Hans Hach Verdugo (Mexico) Miguel Ángel Reyes-Varela	6–4, 6–4
Loss	1–2	Jul 2022	Georgia's Rome Challenger, US	Challenger	Hard	(Philippines) Ruben Gonzales	(France) Enzo Couacaud (Australia) Andrew Harris	4–6, 2–6
Win	2–2	Aug 2022	Dominicana Open, DR	Challenger	Clay	(Philippines) Ruben Gonzales	(Colombia) Nicolás Barrientos (Mexico) Miguel Ángel Reyes-Varela	7–6^{(7–5)}, 6–3
Loss	2–3	Oct 2022	Las Vegas Challenger, US	Challenger	Hard	(Germany) Constantin Frantzen	(United Kingdom) Julian Cash (United Kingdom) Henry Patten	4–6, 6–7^{(1–7)}
Loss	2–4	Nov 2022	HPP Open, Finland	Challenger	Hard (i)	(Greece) Petros Tsitsipas	(India) Purav Raja (India) Divij Sharan	7–6^{(7–5)}, 3–6, [8–10]
Win	3–4	Nov 2022	Maspalomas Challenger, Spain	Challenger	Clay	(United States) Evan King	(Italy) Marco Bortolotti (Spain) Sergio Martos Gornés	6–3, 5–7, [11–9]
Loss	3–5	Feb 2023	Cleveland Open, US	Challenger	Hard (i)	(Philippines) Ruben Gonzales	(United States) Robert Galloway (Mexico) Hans Hach Verdugo	6–3, 5–7, [6–10]
Loss	3–6	Mar 2023	Mexico City Open, Mexico	Challenger	Clay	(United States) Evan King	(Bolivia) Boris Arias (Bolivia) Federico Zeballos	5–7, 7–5, [2–10]
Win	4–6	May 2023	Gwangju Open, South Korea	Challenger	Hard	(United States) Evan King	(Australia) Andrew Harris (Australia) John-Patrick Smith	6–4, 6–2
Win	5–6	May 2023	Busan Open, South Korea	Challenger	Hard	(United States) Evan King	(Australia) Max Purcell (New Zealand) Rubin Statham	walkover
Loss	5–7	Jun 2023	Tyler Championships, US	Challenger	Hard	(United States) Evan King	(Australia) Andrew Harris (Australia) Alex Bolt	1–6, 4–6
Win	6–7	Jun 2023	Caribbean Open, Puerto Rico	Challenger	Hard	(United States) Evan King	(Japan) Toshihide Matsui (Japan) Kaito Uesugi	3–6, 7–5, [11–9]
Win	7–7	Aug 2023	Cary Challenger, US	Challenger	Hard	(United States) Evan King	(Latvia) Miķelis Lībietis (Australia) Adam Walton	6–3, 7–6^{(7–4)}
Win	8–7	Oct 2023	Fairfield Challenger, US	Challenger	Hard	(United States) Evan King	(United States) Vasil Kirkov (United States) Denis Kudla	7–5, 6–3
Win	9–7	Nov 2023	Kobe Challenger, Japan	Challenger	Hard	(United States) Evan King	(South Korea) Nam Ji-sung (Australia) Andrew Harris	7–6^{(7–3)}, 2–6, [10–7]
Win	10–7	Nov 2023	Yokkaichi Challenger, Japan	Challenger	Hard	(United States) Evan King	(Chinese Taipei) Ray Ho (Australia) Calum Puttergill	7–5, 6–4
Win	11–7	May 2024	Wuxi Open, China	Challenger	Hard	(Australia) Calum Puttergill	(Japan) Toshihide Matsui (Japan) Kaito Uesugi	7–6^{(10–8)}, 7–6^{(7–4)}
Win	12–7	Jun 2024	Ilkley Trophy, UK	Challenger	Grass	(United States) Evan King	(United States) Christian Harrison (France) Fabrice Martin	6–3, 3–6, [10–6]
Win	13–7	Sep 2024	Guangzhou Huangpu Open, China	Challenger	Hard	(United States) Evan King	(Philippines) Francis Alcantara (Thailand) Pruchya Isaro	4–6, 7–5, [10–5]
Win	14–7	Nov 2024	Champaign Challenger, US	Challenger	Hard (i)	(United States) Evan King	(United Kingdom) James Davis (United Kingdom) James MacKinlay	7–6^{(7–3)}, 7–5
Loss	14–8	Sep 2025	Shanghai Challenger, China	Challenger	Hard	(Chinese Taipei) Jason Jung	(Thailand) Pruchya Isaro (India) Niki Kaliyanda Poonacha	4–6, 7–6^{(7–2)}, [8–10]
Win	15–8	Sep 2025	Jingshan Tennis Open, China	Challenger	Hard	(India) Anirudh Chandrasekar	(Chinese Taipei) Huang Tsung-hao (South Korea) Park Ui-sung	6–2, 2–6, [10–7]
Loss	15–9	Nov 2025	Queensland International, Australia	Challenger	Hard	(India) Anirudh Chandrasekar	(Australia) Kody Pearson (Australia) Matt Hulme	6–7^{(5–7)}, 6–3, [6–10]
Win	16–9	Jan 2026	Canberra International, Australia	Challenger	Hard	(United States) Mac Kiger	(Australia) Blake Bayldon (Australia) Patrick Harper	7–6^{(7–3)}, 6–3
Loss	16–10	Jan 2026	Phan Thiết Challenger, Vietnam	Challenger	Hard	(United States) George Goldhoff	(Japan) James Trotter (Japan) Kaito Uesugi	3–6, 7–5, [4–10]
Loss	16–11	Mar 2026	Asunción, Paraguay	Challenger	Clay	(United States) Mac Kiger	(Argentina) Mariano Kestelboim (Brazil) Marcelo Zormann	4–6, 5–7
Win	17–11	Apr 2026	Gwangju, South Korea	Challenger	Hard	(United States) Mac Kiger	(India) Anirudh Chandrasekar (Japan) Takeru Yuzuki	6–4, 6–7^{(7–9)}, [10–8]
Loss	17–12	Jun 2026	Nottingham, United Kingdom	Challenger	Grass	(United States) Mac Kiger	(Brazil) Fernando Romboli (United States) Theodore Winegar	3–6, 4–6
Loss	17–13	Sep 2026	Guangzhou, China	Challenger	Hard	(Mexico) Miguel Ángel Reyes-Varela	(Australia) Blake Bayldon (India) Arjun Kadhe	5–7, 6–3, [7–10]
Loss	17–14	Sep 2026	Jingshan, China	Challenger	Hard	(Mexico) Miguel Ángel Reyes-Varela	(Ecuador) Gonzalo Escobar (India) Niki Kaliyanda Poonacha	5–7, 2–6
Loss	17–15	Oct 2026	Sioux Falls, US	Challenger	Hard (i)	(Mexico) Miguel Ángel Reyes-Varela	(Netherlands) Jarno Jans (Belgium) Joran Vliegen	4–6, 6–7^{(7–9)}

Result	W–L	Date	Tournament	Tier	Surface	Partner	Opponents	Score
Win	1–0	Jul 2019	M15 Cancún, Mexico	WTT	Hard	(United States) Austin Rapp	(United States) Nick Chappell (United States) Grey Hamilton	7–6^{(7–3)}, 6–2
Loss	1–1	Sep 2019	M15 Fayetteville, US	WTT	Hard	(United States) Nick Chappell	(Czech Republic) Dominik Kellovský (Czech Republic) Matěj Vocel	6–1, 3–6, [11–13]
Win	2–1	Dec 2019	M15 Cancún, Mexico	WTT	Hard	(United States) Tanner K. Smith	(Canada) Juan Carlos Aguilar (Peru) Jorge Panta	6–7^{(3–7)}, 6–1, [11–9]
Loss	2–2	Mar 2020	M25 Las Vegas, US	WTT	Hard	(United States) Nick Chappell	(Colombia) Nicolás Barrientos (United States) Junior A. Ore	6–7^{(1–7)}, 3–6
Win	3–2	May 2021	M15 Ramat HaSharon, Israel	WTT	Hard	(United States) Felix Corwin	(Sweden) Filip Bergevi (Sweden) Simon Freund	2–6, 7–5, [15–13]
Win	4–2	May 2021	M15 Heraklion, Greece	WTT	Hard	(United Kingdom) Julian Cash	(United Kingdom) George Houghton (United Kingdom) Billy Harris	6–7^{(6–8)}, 6–0, [10–8]
Win	5–2	Jul 2021	M15 Edwardsville, US	WTT	Hard	(United States) Nathan Ponwith	(United States) Bruno Kuzuhara (United States) Christian Langmo	6–4, 6–4
Win	6–2	Aug 2021	M25 Decatur, US	WTT	Hard	(Netherlands) Gijs Brouwer	(Chinese Taipei) Yu Hsiou Hsu (Japan) Shintaro Imai	6–3, 7–5
Win	7–2	Aug 2021	M25 Prostějov, Czech Republic	WTT	Clay	(United States) Nick Chappell	(Czech Republic) Marek Gengel (Belarus) Uladzimir Ignatik	3–6, 7–6^{(7–3)}, [10–8]
