= Guangzhou Huangpu International Tennis Open =

Guangzhou International Tennis Open
- 2026 Guangzhou Huangpu International Tennis Open

ATP Challenger Tour
- Event name: Guangzhou Huangpu International Tennis Open
- Location: Guangzhou, China
- Category: Challenger Tour 100
- Surface: Hard
- Prize money: $160,000 (2025), $133,250 (2024)

The Guangzhou Huangpu International Tennis Open is a professional tennis tournament played on hardcourts. It is currently part of the ATP Challenger Tour. It was first held in Guangzhou, China in 2024.

== Past finals ==
=== Singles ===
Year	Champion	Runner-up	Score
2026	Marat Sharipov	Pavel Kotov	6–0, 6–3
2025	(Argentina) Juan Manuel Cerúndolo	(Chile) Alejandro Tabilo	6–2, 6–3
2024	(Australia) Christopher O'Connell	(Japan) Sho Shimabukuro	1–6, 7–5, 7–6^{(7–5)}

=== Doubles ===
Year	Champions	Runners-up	Score
2026	(Australia) Blake Bayldon (India) Arjun Kadhe	(Mexico) Miguel Ángel Reyes-Varela (United States) Reese Stalder	7–5, 3–6, [10–7]
2025	(Australia) Matthew Romios (United States) Ryan Seggerman	(Japan) Kaito Uesugi (Japan) Seita Watanabe	6–1, 6–3
2024	(United States) Evan King (United States) Reese Stalder	(Philippines) Francis Alcantara (Thailand) Pruchya Isaro	4–6, 7–5, [10–5]
