= 2026 Championnats Banque Nationale de Granby =

- Date: 13–19 July
- Edition: 31st (men); 14th (women)
- Category: ATP Challenger Tour; ITF Women's World Tennis Tour
- Surface: Hard / Outdoor
- Location: Granby, Canada

Champions

Men's singles
- (Australia) Aleksandar Vukic

Women's singles
- (Canada) Kayla Cross

Men's doubles
- (New Zealand) Finn Reynolds / (New Zealand) James Watt

Women's doubles
- (United States) Kylie Collins / (United States) Olivia Lincer
- Championnats de Granby

The 2026 Championnats Banque Nationale de Granby was a professional tennis tournament played on outdoor hard courts. It was the 31st (men) and 14th (women) editions of the tournament, which were part of the 2026 ATP Challenger Tour and the 2026 ITF Women's World Tennis Tour. It took place in Granby, Quebec, between 13 and 19 July 2026.

== Champions ==
=== Men's singles ===
- (Australia) Aleksandar Vukic def. (France) Arthur Géa 6–4, 1–6, 6–1.

=== Women's singles ===
- (Canada) Kayla Cross def. (Japan) Sara Saito 7–5, 6–1.

=== Men's doubles ===
- (New Zealand) Finn Reynolds / (New Zealand) James Watt def. (France) Guillaume Dalmasso / (United States) Matt Kuhar 6–3, 6–4.

=== Women's doubles ===
- (United States) Kylie Collins / (United States) Olivia Lincer def. (Canada) Mia Kupres / (Canada) Alexandra Vagramov 6–2, 6–2.

== Men's singles main-draw entrants ==
=== Seeds ===
Country	Player	Rank^{1}	Seed
AUS	Aleksandar Vukic	104	1
FRA	Arthur Géa	136	2
DEN	August Holmgren	143	3
AUS	Tristan Schoolkate	149	4
CAN	Liam Draxl	158	5
CHN	Zhang Zhizhen	161	6
EST	Daniil Glinka	168	7
CAN	Alexis Galarneau	179	8

- ^{1} Rankings are as of June 29, 2026.

=== Other entrants ===
The following players received wildcards into the singles main draw:

- (Canada) Nicolas Arseneault
- (Canada) Duncan Chan
- (Canada) Keegan Rice

The following player received entry into the singles main draw using a protected ranking:

- (United States) Aidan Mayo

The following player received entry into the singles main draw through the College Accelerator programme:

- (Japan) Jay Friend

The following players received entry into the singles main draw as alternates:

- (Canada) Justin Boulais
- (United States) Garrett Johns
- (United States) Daniel Milavsky
- (Japan) Yuta Shimizu

The following players received entry from the qualifying draw:

- (France) Guillaume Dalmasso
- (United States) Adhithya Ganesan
- (United States) Strong Kirchheimer
- (Japan) Kenta Miyoshi
- (Canada) Alexander Rozin
- (Japan) James Trotter
