= 2026 Championnats Banque Nationale de Granby – Men's singles =

Men's singles
- 2026 Championnats Banque Nationale de Granby

Final
- Champion: (Australia) Aleksandar Vukic
- Runner-up: (France) Arthur Géa
- Score: 6–4, 1–6, 6–1

Events
| Singles | men | women |
| Doubles | men | women |
- Championnats Banque Nationale de Granby

August Holmgren was the defending champion but lost in the semifinals to Aleksandar Vukic.

Vukic won the title after defeating Arthur Géa 6–4, 1–6, 6–1 in the final.

== Seeds ==
1. (Australia) Aleksandar Vukic (champion)
2. (France) Arthur Géa (final)
3. (Denmark) August Holmgren (semifinals)
4. (Australia) Tristan Schoolkate (first round)
5. (Canada) Liam Draxl (quarterfinals)
6. (China) Zhang Zhizhen (first round)
7. (Estonia) Daniil Glinka (second round)
8. (Canada) Alexis Galarneau (quarterfinals)

== Draw ==
Key

- Q = Qualifier
- WC = Wild card
- LL = Lucky loser
- Alt = Alternate
- ITF = ITF entry
- PR = Protected ranking
- SR = Special ranking
- SE = Special exempt
- JE = Junior exempt
- JR = Junior Accelerator Programme entrant
- CO = College Accelerator Programme entrant
- NG = Next Gen Accelerator Program entrant
- w/o = Walkover
- r = Retired
- d = Defaulted

=== Finals ===
Semifinals
1 | (Australia) Aleksandar Vukic | 6 | 3 | 6
3 | (Denmark) August Holmgren | 4 | 6 | 3
(United States) Murphy Cassone | 3 | 3
2 | (France) Arthur Géa | 6 | 6

Final
1 | (Australia) Aleksandar Vukic | 6 | 1 | 6
2 | (France) Arthur Géa | 4 | 6 | 1

=== Top half ===
First round
1 | (Australia) A Vukic | 6 | 5 | 7^{7}
(United Kingdom) L Broady | 4 | 7 | 6^{4}
WC | (Canada) N Arseneault | 6 | 6^{4} | 6
(United States) A Martin | 2 | 7^{7} | 3
Q | (United States) A Ganesan | 6^{1} | 7^{7} | 6^{13}
(United States) T Zink | 7^{7} | 6^{5} | 7^{15}
(Japan) K Uchida | 2 | 1
8 | (Canada) A Galarneau | 6 | 6
3 | (Denmark) A Holmgren | 6^{6} | 6 | 7
(Japan) Y Watanuki | 7^{8} | 4 | 5
Q | (France) Guillaume Dalmasso | 4 | 4
PR | (United States) A Mayo | 6 | 6
Alt | (Japan) Y Shimizu | 6 | 4 | 6
CO | (Japan) J Friend | 2 | 6 | 2
Alt | (Canada) J Boulais | 6 | 7^{8}
6 | (China) Z Zhang | 2 | 6^{6}

Second round
1 | (Australia) A Vukic | 6 | 6
WC | (Canada) N Arseneault | 3 | 3
(United States) T Zink | 1 | 7 | 6^{2}
8 | (Canada) A Galarneau | 6 | 5 | 7^{7}
3 | (Denmark) A Holmgren | 7^{7} | 6
PR | (United States) A Mayo | 6^{4} | 2
Alt | (Japan) Y Shimizu | 5 | 1
Alt | (Canada) J Boulais | 7 | 6

Quarterfinals
1 | (Australia) A Vukic | 7^{7} | 7^{7}
8 | (Canada) A Galarneau | 6^{2} | 6^{2}
3 | (Denmark) A Holmgren | 6 | 6
Alt | (Canada) J Boulais | 1 | 3

Semifinals
1 | (Australia) A Vukic | 6 | 3 | 6
3 | (Denmark) A Holmgren | 4 | 6 | 3

=== Bottom half ===
First round
7 | (Estonia) D Glinka | 7^{7} | 6
Alt | (United States) G Johns | 6^{2} | 3
Q | (United States) S Kirchheimer | 4 | 0
(Australia) P Sekulic | 6 | 6
(Jamaica) B Bicknell | 6 | 7^{7}
Q | (Japan) Kenta Miyoshi | 1 | 6^{3}
(United States) M Cassone | 7 | 4 | 7^{7}
4 | (Australia) T Schoolkate | 5 | 6 | 6^{4}
5 | (Canada) L Draxl | 1 | 6 | 6
Q | (Japan) J Trotter | 6 | 3 | 3
Alt | (United States) D Milavsky | 6 | 6
WC | (Canada) D Chan | 4 | 2
Q | (Canada) Alexander Rozin | 6^{5} | 6^{0}
WC | (Canada) Keegan Rice | 7^{7} | 7^{7}
(China) F Sun | 2 | 3
2 | (France) A Géa | 6 | 6

Second round
7 | (Estonia) D Glinka | 1 | 6 | 3
(Australia) P Sekulic | 6 | 1 | 6
(Jamaica) B Bicknell | 7^{9} | 2 | 5
(United States) M Cassone | 6^{7} | 6 | 7
5 | (Canada) L Draxl | 7 | 6
Alt | (United States) D Milavsky | 5 | 1
WC | (Canada) K Rice | 4 | 2
2 | (France) A Géa | 6 | 6

Quarterfinals
(Australia) P Sekulic | 2 | 1
(United States) M Cassone | 6 | 6
5 | (Canada) L Draxl | 6^{5} | 6 | 0
2 | (France) A Géa | 7^{7} | 2 | 6

Semifinals
(United States) M Cassone | 3 | 3
2 | (France) A Géa | 6 | 6
