= 2026 Championnats Banque Nationale de Granby – Men's doubles =

Men's doubles
- 2026 Championnats Banque Nationale de Granby

Final
- Champions: (New Zealand) Finn Reynolds (New Zealand) James Watt
- Runners-up: (France) Guillaume Dalmasso (United States) Matt Kuhar
- Score: 6–3, 6–4

Events
Singles	men	women
Doubles	men	women
- Championnats Banque Nationale de Granby

Finn Reynolds and James Watt were the defending champions and successfully retained their title after defeating Guillaume Dalmasso and Matt Kuhar 6–3, 6–4 in the final.

== Seeds ==
1. (New Zealand) Finn Reynolds / (New Zealand) James Watt (champions)
2. (Australia) Kody Pearson / (Australia) Calum Puttergill (quarterfinals)
3. (Australia) Ethan Cook / (Brazil) Bruno Oliveira (first round)
4. (United States) Garrett Johns / (United States) Daniel Milavsky (quarterfinals)

== Draw ==
Key

- Q = Qualifier
- WC = Wild card
- LL = Lucky loser
- Alt = Alternate
- ITF = ITF entry
- PR = Protected ranking
- SR = Special ranking
- SE = Special exempt
- JE = Junior exempt
- JR = Junior Accelerator Programme entrant
- CO = College Accelerator Programme entrant
- NG = Next Gen Accelerator Program entrant
- w/o = Walkover
- r = Retired
- d = Defaulted

First round
1	(New Zealand) F Reynolds (New Zealand) J Watt	6	6
(Japan) J Friend (United States) T Zink	4	4
(Japan) K Isomura (Japan) Leo Vithoontien	6^{5}	3
(Venezuela) Juan José Bianchi (Mexico) A Magadán	7^{7}	6
3	(Australia) Ethan Cook (Brazil) Bruno Oliveira	6^{6}	4
WC	(Canada) Mikael Arseneault (Canada) N Arseneault	7^{8}	6
WC	(Canada) D Chan (Canada) Keegan Rice	2	0
(United States) K Poling (Japan) J Trotter	6	6
(Canada) J Boulais (Antigua and Barbuda) J Maginley	3	7^{12}	[5]
(France) Guillaume Dalmasso (United States) Matt Kuhar	6	6^{10}	[10]
Alt	(Canada) Benjamin Thomas George (Canada) Alexander Rozin	7	2	[5]
(Japan) K Uchida (Japan) S Watanabe	5	6	[10]
(China) F Sun (China) Z Zhang	6	4	[10]
2	(Australia) K Pearson (Australia) C Puttergill	4	6	[12]

Quarterfinals
1	(New Zealand) F Reynolds (New Zealand) J Watt	7	6
(Venezuela) JJ Bianchi (Mexico) A Magadán	5	3
WC	(Canada) M Arseneault (Canada) N Arseneault	4	6^{3}
(United States) K Poling (Japan) J Trotter	6	7^{7}
(France) G Dalmasso (United States) M Kuhar	6	7^{11}
4	(United States) G Johns (United States) D Milavsky	1	6^{9}
(Japan) K Uchida (Japan) S Watanabe	6	6
2	(Australia) K Pearson (Australia) C Puttergill	4	2

Semifinals
1	(New Zealand) F Reynolds (New Zealand) J Watt	6	6^{4}	[10]
(United States) K Poling (Japan) J Trotter	3	7^{7}	[6]
(France) G Dalmasso (United States) M Kuhar	6	6
(Japan) K Uchida (Japan) S Watanabe	2	4

Final
1	(New Zealand) F Reynolds (New Zealand) J Watt	6	6
(France) G Dalmasso (United States) M Kuhar	3	4
