= Arthur Géa =

French tennis player (born 2005)

- Géa at the 2026 Wimbledon Championships
- Country (sports): France
- Born: 2 January 2005 (age 21) Carpentras, France
- Height: 1.80 m (5 ft 11 in)
- Turned pro: 2023
- Plays: Right-handed (two-handed backhand)
- Coach: Andrea Morlet (2026–), Gerald Melzer (2025–26), Tarik Benhabiles (2023–25), Grégoire Jacq
- Prize money: US $1,522,150

Singles
- Career record: 16–8 (at ATP Tour level, Grand Slam level, and in Davis Cup)
- Career titles: 1
- Highest ranking: No. 44 (19 October 2026)
- Current ranking: No. 47 (9 November 2026)

Grand Slam singles results
- Australian Open: 2R (2026)
- French Open: 1R (2026)
- Wimbledon: Q2 (2026)
- US Open: 4R (2026)

Doubles
- Career record: 0–2 (at ATP Tour level, Grand Slam level, and in Davis Cup)
- Career titles: 0
- Highest ranking: No. 456 (5 May 2025)

Grand Slam doubles results
- French Open: 1R (2025, 2026)
- Last updated on: 19 October 2026.

Arthur Géa (French: [aʁtyʁ ʒea]; born 2 January 2005) is a French professional tennis player. He has a career-high ATP singles ranking of world No. 44 achieved on 19 October 2026 and a doubles ranking of No. 456, reached on 5 May 2025.

Géa has won one ATP Tour singles title at the 2026 Los Cabos Open.

== Early life ==
Géa is from Velleron near Carpentras, in Vaucluse, France. He started taking tennis lessons in his early childhood. Between the ages of seven and thirteen, Géa trained at the Alain Barrère academy in Pontet, before joining the Ligue de Provence.

== Junior career ==
Géa reached the third round of the boys' singles category at the 2022 French Open, and in the boys' singles at the 2022 US Open. At the 2023 Wimbledon Championships, he lost to eventual champion Henry Searle in the third round of the boys' singles, but was a runner-up in doubles that edition, with Serbian Branko Djuric. Later that season, he reached the semifinals of the 2023 US Open in singles, where he lost to American Learner Tien.

He had good results on ITF junior circuit, maintaining a 93–52 singles win-loss record and reached an ITF junior combined ranking of world No. 8 on 30 January 2023.

== Professional career ==
=== 2023: Maiden ITF title, Major qualifying debut ===
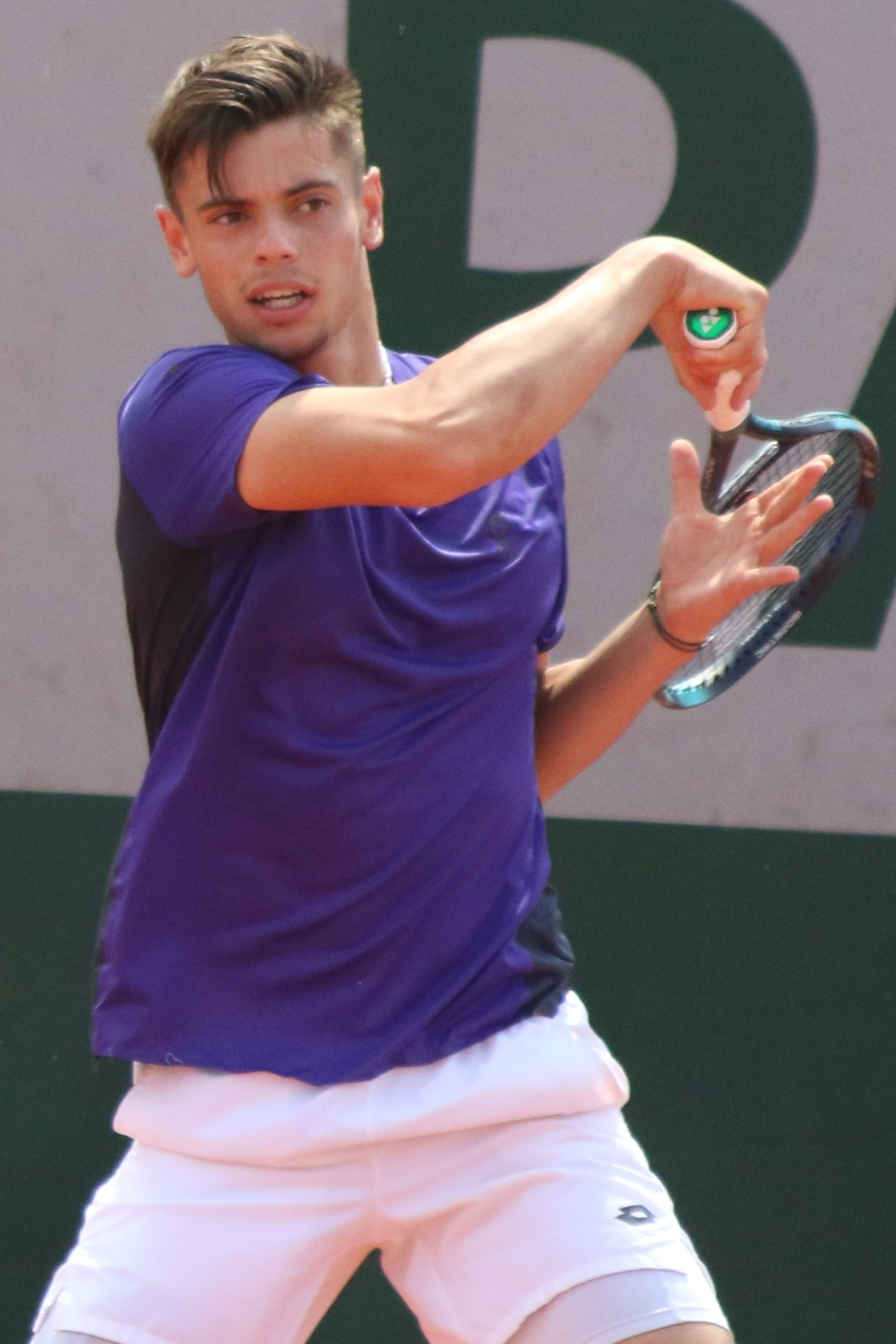
Géa at the 2023 French Open

In May, Géa made his debut at the French Open qualifying rounds after receiving a wildcard for the event. He lost in the first round to Liam Broady. In June, after receiving a wildcard into the 2023 Internationaux de Tennis de Blois, Géa made his debut and recorded his first win at the Challenger level, defeating world No. 135 Timofey Skatov in straight sets.

Coached by Tarik Benhabiles and Jérôme Pottier, Géa made a successful start to his pro-career when he reached his first ITF Tour final in Heraklion in November 2023 where he lost to Guy den Ouden. The following week at the same venue he won his first senior title on the ITF Tour with a three sets victory over Cezar Crețu. He then won two more ITF Tour titles in the same month to reach four consecutive finals, winning three consecutive titles, including a win in the final of the fourth event over the higher ranked Brit Alastair Gray.

=== 2024: Challenger doubles final ===
In March, Géa qualified for the 2024 Challenger Città di Lugano in Lugano. In the first round he defeated the higher ranked Lloyd Harris. He followed that win in his next Challenger event, the 2024 Tennis Napoli Cup, with a win over former top-ten player Fabio Fognini.

In the first qualifying round at the French Open, Géa lost in a deciding set to Lloyd Harris. He reached the final of the men's doubles at the 2024 Internationaux de Tennis de Blois in June 2024, playing alongside Corentin Denolly. He finished 2024 with back-to-back titles in M15 events in Doha.

=== 2025: Major doubles and ATP & top 250 singles debuts ===
Géa started 2025 with a final at the ITF tournament in Hazebrouck and a title at the ITF Tour tournament in Bressuire, defeating compatriot Maé Malige in the final, for his 19th win out of 20 matches.

In February, Géa made his ATP Tour debut at the 2025 Open 13 Provence in Marseille, France, as a qualifier after defeating Henri Squire and Yosuke Watanuki in the qualifying rounds. He lost to fellow qualifier Hugo Grenier in the first round, but still entered the top 300 on 17 February 2025.

In May, Géa received a wildcard into the qualifying competition and a main draw wildcard for his Grand Slam doubles debut at the French Open, partnering with Moïse Kouamé.

=== 2026: Major and top 50 debuts, ATP title, US Open fourth round ===
In January, Géa won his first Challenger title in Nouméa, New Caledonia, defeating Jurij Rodionov in the final. As a result, Géa made his Top 200 debut on 12 January 2026.

The following week, Géa made his Grand Slam singles debut at the Australian Open as a qualifier. He recorded his first Major win by defeating 17th seed Jiří Lehečka. He lost to Stan Wawrinka in the second round in five sets.

In February, Géa reached his first quarterfinal on the ATP Tour at the Open Occitanie, having received a wildcard into the main draw. He defeated Giovanni Mpetshi Perricard in the first round and third seed Tomáš Macháč in the second round. He lost to eventual finalist Adrian Mannarino in the quarterfinals.

Awarded a wildcard into the main draw at the 2026 French Open, he faced 13th-seed Karen Khachanov, and lost in straight sets having suffered ill-health during the match.

Ranked No. 127, Géa won his maiden ATP Tour title at the Los Cabos Open. Following a win over third seed Francisco Cerúndolo in the quarterfinal, his second top 20 win,, he went on to defeat Coleman Wong in the semifinal and defending champion Denis Shapovalov in the final. As a result Géa reached the top 100 at world No. 82 on 3 August 2026.

In August, Gea reached his first Major's fourth round at the US Open. He advanced to the main draw as a lucky loser having lost to Nishesh Basavareddy in the final round of qualifying. In the main draw, he defeated Juan Manuel Cerundolo in the first round, Zachary Svajda in the second round, and Michael Zheng in the third round to become the second lucky loser to advance to the round of 16 at the US Open. In the fourth round he was defeated by Botic van de Zandschulp in five sets after five hours and 13 minutes, the fourth longest match on record at the US Open. Géa held a match point on serve after winning the opening two sets, before losing the set and the following one in tie-breaks, and a tight fifth set. In the fourth set he was serving for the match at 5-4. Had Gea had won this match, he would have become the first Lucky Loser in tennis history to reach a grand slam quarterfinal.

In October, Géa made his Masters 1000 main draw debut at the Shanghai Masters. He recorded his first top 10 win by defeating third seed and World No. 4 Ben Shelton in the third round. He entered the top 50 as a result. He then defeated 13th seed Jakub Mensik to reach the quarterfinal. He lost to Alejandro Davidovich Fokina in the quarterfinal.

== Personal life ==
Géa currently trains at the National Training Center of the French Tennis Federation in Paris.

== Performance timeline ==
Key
W	F	SF	QF	#R	RR	Q#	DNQ	A	NH

(W) winner; (F) finalist; (SF) semifinalist; (QF) quarterfinalist; (#R) rounds 4, 3, 2, 1; (RR) round-robin stage; (Q#) qualification round; (DNQ) did not qualify; (A) absent; (NH) not held; (SR) strike rate (events won / competed); (W–L) win–loss record.
To avoid confusion and double counting, these charts are updated at the conclusion of a tournament or when the player's participation has ended.

=== Singles ===
Tournament	2023	2024	2025	2026	SR	W–L	Win %
Grand Slam tournaments
Australian Open	A	A	A	2R	0 / 1	1–1	50%
French Open	Q1	Q1	Q2	1R	0 / 1	0–1	0%
Wimbledon	A	A	A	Q2	0 / 0	0–0	–
US Open	A	A	A	4R	0 / 1	3–1	75%
Win–loss	0–0	0–0	0–0	4–3	0 / 3	4–3	57%
ATP 1000 tournaments
Indian Wells Open	A	A	A	A	0 / 0	0–0	–
Miami Open	A	A	A	A	0 / 0	0–0	–
Monte-Carlo Masters	A	A	A	A	0 / 0	0–0	–
Madrid Open	A	A	A	Q1	0 / 0	0–0	–
Italian Open	A	A	A	A	0 / 0	0–0	–
Canadian Open	A	A	A	A	0 / 0	0–0	–
Cincinnati Open	A	A	A	A	0 / 0	0–0	–
Shanghai Masters	A	A	A	QF	0 / 1	4–1	80%
Paris Masters	A	A	A	1R	0 / 1	0–1	0%
Win–loss	0–0	0–0	0–0	4–2	0 / 2	4–2	67%

== ATP Tour finals ==
=== Singles: 1 (title) ===
Legend Grand Slam (–) ATP 1000 (–) ATP 500 (–) ATP 250 (1–0)	Finals by surface Hard (1–0) Clay (–) Grass (–)	Finals by setting Outdoor (1–0) Indoor (–)

Result	W–L	Date	Tournament	Tier	Surface	Opponent	Score
Win	1–0	Aug 2026	Los Cabos Open, Mexico	ATP 250	Hard	(Canada) Denis Shapovalov	6–3, 6–4

== ATP Challenger Tour finals ==
=== Singles: 3 (1 title, 2 runner-ups) ===
Legend ATP Challenger (1–2)	Finals by surface Hard (1–1) Clay (0–1)

Result	W–L	Date	Tournament	Surface	Opponent	Score
Win	1–0	Jan 2026	BNC Tennis Open, New Caledonia	Hard	(Austria) Jurij Rodionov	6–3, 4–6, 7–5
Loss	1–1	Mar 2026	Zadar Open, Croatia	Clay	(Italy) Stefano Travaglia	1–2, ret.
Loss	1–2	Jul 2026	Championnats de Granby, Canada	Hard	(Australia) Aleksandar Vukic	4–6, 6–1, 1–6

=== Doubles: 1 (runner-up) ===
Legend ATP Challenger (0–1)

Result	W–L	Date	Tournament	Surface	Partner	Opponents	Score
Loss	0–1	Jun 2024	Internationaux de Blois, France	Hard (i)	(France) Corentin Denolly	(Zimbabwe) Benjamin Lock (Zimbabwe) Courtney John Lock	6–1, 3–6, [4–10]

== ITF World Tennis Tour finals ==
=== Singles: 12 (9 titles, 3 runner-ups) ===
Legend ITF World Tennis (9–3)	Finals by surface Hard (9–2) Clay (0–1)

Result	W–L	Date	Tournament	Surface	Opponent	Score
Loss	0–1	Nov 2023	M25 Heraklion, Greece	Hard	(Netherlands) Guy den Ouden	2–6, 2–6
Win	1–1	Nov 2023	M25 Heraklion, Greece	Hard	(Romania) Cezar Crețu	2–6, 6–3, 6–2
Win	2–1	Nov 2023	M15 Heraklion, Greece	Hard	(Czech Republic) Jakub Nicod	5–2 ret.
Win	3–1	Nov 2023	M15 Heraklion, Greece	Hard	(United Kingdom) Alastair Gray	7–6^{(7–2)}, 6–3
Win	4–1	Dec 2024	M15 Doha, Qatar	Hard	(Italy) Giovanni Fonio	7–5, 6–3
Win	5–1	Dec 2024	M15 Doha, Qatar	Hard	Savriyan Danilov	6–4, 6–0
Loss	5–2	Jan 2025	M25 Hazebrouck, France	Hard (i)	(Belgium) Joris De Loore	6–7^{(2–7)}, 7–6^{(7–5)}, 3–6
Win	6–2	Jan 2025	M15 Bressuire, France	Hard (i)	(France) Maé Malige	6–2, 6–2
Loss	6–3	Apr 2025	M25 Santa Margherita di Pula, Italy	Clay	(United Kingdom) Jay Clarke	6–4, 3–6, 4–6
Win	7–3	Aug 2025	M25 Bali, Indonesia	Hard	(Turkey) Yanki Erel	6–3, 3–6, 7–5
Win	8–3	Aug 2025	M25 Bali, Indonesia	Hard	(Australia) Philip Sekulic	6–1, 6–2
Win	9–3	Oct 2025	M25 Monastir, Tunisia	Hard	Igor Kudriashov	6–2, 6–0

=== Doubles: 2 (1 title, 1 runner-up) ===
Legend ITF World Tennis (1–1)

Result	W–L	Date	Tournament	Surface	Partner	Opponents	Score
Win	1–0	Jul 2023	M25 Dénia, Spain	Clay	(United States) Dali Blanch	(Spain) Luis Francisco (Spain) Joan Torres Espinosa	4–6, 6–3, [10–7]
Loss	1–1	Aug 2024	M15 Sofia, Bulgaria	Clay	(Ukraine) Vladyslav Orlov	(Bulgaria) Anthony Genov (Bulgaria) Nikolay Nedelchev	2–6, 7–6^{(7–3)}, [7–10]

== Junior Grand Slam finals ==
=== Doubles: 1 (runner-up) ===
Result	Year	Tournament	Surface	Partner	Opponents	Score
Loss	2023	Wimbledon	Grass	(Serbia) Branko Djuric	(Czech Republic) Jakub Filip (Italy) Gabriele Vulpitta	3–6, 3–6

== Wins over top 10 players ==
Season	2026	Total
Wins	1	1

#	Player	Rank	Event	Surface	Rd	Score	AGR
2026
1.	(United States) Ben Shelton	4	Shanghai Masters, China	Hard	3R	7–6^{(7–5)}, 7–6^{(7–3)}	56

*As of 11 October 2026
