= 2026 Australian Open – Men's singles =

Tennis championship

Men's singles
- 2026 Australian Open

Final
- Champion: (Spain) Carlos Alcaraz
- Runner-up: (Serbia) Novak Djokovic
- Score: 2–6, 6–2, 6–3, 7–5
- Date: 1 February 2026

Details
- Draw: 128 (16Q / 8WC)
- Seeds: 32

Events
| Singles | men | women | | boys | girls |
| Doubles | men | women | mixed | boys | girls |
| WC Singles | men | women | quad | boys | girls |
| WC Doubles | men | women | quad | boys | girls |

Qualification
| Singles | men | women |
- Australian Open

Carlos Alcaraz defeated Novak Djokovic in the final, 2–6, 6–2, 6–3, 7–5 to win the men's singles tennis title at the 2026 Australian Open. It was his first Australian Open title and seventh major title overall, becoming the ninth and youngest man to complete the career Grand Slam in singles (at 22 years, 272 days old). He also became the youngest man in the Open Era to reach the singles final of all four majors at 22 years, 270 days old, and the youngest man to win a seventh major title. The final was a rematch of the previous year's quarterfinal match, won by Djokovic. With the win, Alcaraz ended Djokovic's unbeaten 10–0 record in Australian Open finals, making Djokovic the fourth man in the Open Era to finish runner-up at all four majors (after Ivan Lendl, Roger Federer, and Andy Murray).

Jannik Sinner was the two-time defending champion, but lost in the semifinals to Djokovic in a rematch of their semifinal match two years prior. Sinner's loss ended his streak of five consecutive major finals, dating back to the 2024 US Open.

At 38 years and 255 days old, Djokovic became the oldest man in history to reach the Australian Open final, and the oldest major finalist overall since Ken Rosewall at the 1974 US Open. By making his 81st career major appearance, he equaled Federer and Feliciano López's joint all-time record for the most total major main draw appearances, and equaled Federer's record 21 Australian Open main draw appearances. By reaching the final, he earned a record 104th Australian Open match win, surpassing Federer's tally. Djokovic was the first man to record 100 main-draw match wins at three different majors, having also done so at the French Open and Wimbledon Championships.

At 5 hours and 27 minutes long, the semifinal between Alcaraz and Alexander Zverev was the longest Australian Open semifinal (surpassing the 2009 semifinal between Rafael Nadal and Fernando Verdasco), and third-longest overall match in tournament history. Valentin Vacherot became the first Monégasque singles player to reach the third round of a major in the Open Era. Learner Tien was the youngest player to reach the Australian Open quarterfinals since Nick Kyrgios in 2015.

For the first time in the Open Era, and first time since the 32-seed system was introduced at the 2001 Wimbledon Championships, all the players who reached the fourth round at a major were seeded. For the first time in the Open Era, the top six seeds reached the quarterfinals in both the men's and women's singles competitions. This was also the first time since the 2019 French Open that the top four men's seeds all reached the semifinals of a major, and the first such occurrence at the Australian Open since 2013.

The tournament marked the final Australian Open appearance of 2014 champion, three-time major champion, and former world No. 3 Stan Wawrinka; he lost in the third round to Taylor Fritz. At 40 years and 296 days old, Wawrinka was the oldest player to reach the third round of a major since Rosewall at the 1978 Australian Open. His second-round win marked his 58th five-set match, tied with Lendl for the most by any player in the Open Era.

== Seeds ==
1. (Spain) Carlos Alcaraz (champion)
2. (Italy) Jannik Sinner (semifinals)
3. (Germany) Alexander Zverev (semifinals)
4. (Serbia) Novak Djokovic (final)
5. (Italy) Lorenzo Musetti (quarterfinals, retired)
6. (Australia) Alex de Minaur (quarterfinals)
7. (Canada) Félix Auger-Aliassime (first round, retired)
8. (United States) Ben Shelton (quarterfinals)
9. (United States) Taylor Fritz (fourth round)
10. (Kazakhstan) Alexander Bublik (fourth round)
11. Daniil Medvedev (fourth round)
12. (Norway) Casper Ruud (fourth round)
13. Andrey Rublev (third round)
14. (Spain) Alejandro Davidovich Fokina (third round, retired)
15. Karen Khachanov (third round)
16. (Czech Republic) Jakub Menšík (fourth round, withdrew)
17. (Czech Republic) Jiří Lehečka (first round)
18. (Argentina) Francisco Cerúndolo (fourth round)
19. (United States) Tommy Paul (fourth round)
20. (Italy) Flavio Cobolli (first round)
21. (Canada) Denis Shapovalov (second round)
22. (Italy) Luciano Darderi (fourth round)
23. (Netherlands) Tallon Griekspoor (first round)
24. (France) Arthur Rinderknech (first round)
25. (United States) Learner Tien (quarterfinals)
26. (United Kingdom) Cameron Norrie (third round)
27. (United States) Brandon Nakashima (first round)
28. (Brazil) João Fonseca (first round)
29. (United States) Frances Tiafoe (third round)
30. (Monaco) Valentin Vacherot (third round)
31. (Greece) Stefanos Tsitsipas (second round)
32. (France) Corentin Moutet (third round)

== Draw ==
Key

- Q = Qualifier
- WC = Wild card
- LL = Lucky loser
- Alt = Alternate
- ITF = ITF entry
- PR = Protected ranking
- SR = Special ranking
- SE = Special exempt
- JE = Junior exempt
- JR = Junior Accelerator Programme entrant
- CO = College Accelerator Programme entrant
- NG = Next Gen Accelerator Program entrant
- w/o = Walkover
- r = Retired
- d = Defaulted

=== Finals ===
Quarterfinals
1 | (Spain) Carlos Alcaraz | 7 | 6 | 6
6 | (Australia) Alex de Minaur | 5 | 2 | 1
3 | (Germany) Alexander Zverev | 6 | 6^{5} | 6 | 7^{7}
25 | (United States) Learner Tien | 3 | 7^{7} | 1 | 6^{3}
5 | (Italy) Lorenzo Musetti | 6 | 6 | 1^{r}
4 | (Serbia) Novak Djokovic | 4 | 3 | 3
8 | (United States) Ben Shelton | 3 | 4 | 4
2 | (Italy) Jannik Sinner | 6 | 6 | 6

Semifinals
1 | (Spain) Carlos Alcaraz | 6 | 7^{7} | 6^{3} | 6^{4} | 7
3 | (Germany) Alexander Zverev | 4 | 6^{5} | 7^{7} | 7^{7} | 5
4 | (Serbia) Novak Djokovic | 3 | 6 | 4 | 6 | 6
2 | (Italy) Jannik Sinner | 6 | 3 | 6 | 4 | 4

Final
1 | (Spain) Carlos Alcaraz | 2 | 6 | 6 | 7
4 | (Serbia) Novak Djokovic | 6 | 2 | 3 | 5

=== Top half ===
==== Section 1 ====
First round
1 | (Spain) C Alcaraz | 6 | 7^{7} | 6
(Australia) A Walton | 3 | 6^{2} | 2
(Germany) Y Hanfmann | 7 | 4 | 6 | 7^{7}
Q | (United States) Z Svajda | 5 | 6 | 4 | 6^{3}
Q | (United States) M Zheng | 6 | 6 | 3 | 6^{0} | 6
(United States) S Korda | 4 | 4 | 6 | 7^{7} | 3
(Australia) T Schoolkate | 4 | 6^{1} | 3
32 | (France) C Moutet | 6 | 7^{7} | 6
19 | (United States) T Paul | 6 | 6 | 6
(United States) A Kovacevic | 4 | 3 | 3
(Argentina) TA Tirante | 7 | 6 | 6
(Australia) A Vukic | 5 | 2 | 2
Q | (Norway) N Budkov Kjær | 4 | 3 | 4
(United States) R Opelka | 6 | 6 | 6
(Austria) F Misolic | 2 | 3 | 3
14 | (Spain) A Davidovich Fokina | 6 | 6 | 6

Second round
1 | (Spain) C Alcaraz | 7^{7} | 6 | 6
(Germany) Y Hanfmann | 6^{4} | 3 | 2
Q | (United States) M Zheng | 6 | 1 | 3 | 0^{r}
32 | (France) C Moutet | 3 | 6 | 6 | 2
19 | (United States) T Paul | 6 | 6 | 6
(Argentina) TA Tirante | 3 | 4 | 2
(United States) R Opelka | 3 | 6^{3} | 7 | 6 | 4
14 | (Spain) A Davidovich Fokina | 6 | 7^{7} | 5 | 4 | 6

Third round
1 | (Spain) C Alcaraz | 6 | 6 | 6
32 | (France) C Moutet | 2 | 4 | 1
19 | (United States) T Paul | 6 | 6 | 0
14 | (Spain) A Davidovich Fokina | 1 | 1 | 0^{r}

Fourth round
1 | (Spain) C Alcaraz | 7^{8} | 6 | 7
19 | (United States) T Paul | 6^{6} | 4 | 5

==== Section 2 ====
First round
10 | (Kazakhstan) A Bublik | 6 | 6 | 6
(United States) J Brooksby | 4 | 4 | 4
(Argentina) C Ugo Carabelli | 6^{5} | 1 | 2
(Hungary) M Fucsovics | 7^{7} | 6 | 6
(Serbia) M Kecmanović | 2 | 6 | 6 | 3 | 4
(Argentina) TM Etcheverry | 6 | 3 | 4 | 6 | 6
Q | (United Kingdom) A Fery | 7^{7} | 6 | 6
20 | (Italy) F Cobolli | 6^{1} | 4 | 1
29 | (United States) F Tiafoe | 7^{7} | 6 | 6
Q | (Australia) J Kubler | 6^{4} | 3 | 2
WC | (United States) P Kypson | 2 | 3 | 6 | 3
(Argentina) F Comesaña | 6 | 6 | 3 | 6
(Argentina) M Navone | 2 | 7^{7} | 4 | 2
(Serbia) H Medjedovic | 6 | 6^{3} | 6 | 6
LL | (United States) M McDonald | 2 | 2 | 3
6 | (Australia) A de Minaur | 6 | 6 | 6

Second round
10 | (Kazakhstan) A Bublik | 7 | 6 | 7
(Hungary) M Fucsovics | 5 | 4 | 5
(Argentina) TM Etcheverry | 7^{7} | 6 | 6
Q | (United Kingdom) A Fery | 6^{4} | 1 | 3
29 | (United States) F Tiafoe | 6 | 6 | 4 | 6
(Argentina) F Comesaña | 4 | 3 | 6 | 2
(Serbia) H Medjedovic | 7^{7} | 2 | 2 | 1
6 | (Australia) A de Minaur | 6^{5} | 6 | 6 | 6

Third round
10 | (Kazakhstan) A Bublik | 7^{7} | 7^{7} | 6
(Argentina) TM Etcheverry | 6^{4} | 6^{5} | 4
29 | (United States) F Tiafoe | 3 | 4 | 5
6 | (Australia) A de Minaur | 6 | 6 | 7

Fourth round
10 | (Kazakhstan) A Bublik | 4 | 1 | 1
6 | (Australia) A de Minaur | 6 | 6 | 6

==== Section 3 ====
First round
3 | (Germany) A Zverev | 6^{1} | 6 | 6 | 6
(Canada) G Diallo | 7^{7} | 1 | 4 | 2
(Australia) A Popyrin | 6 | 3 | 6 | 6^{5} | 6^{4}
(France) A Müller | 2 | 6 | 3 | 7^{7} | 7^{10}
(United States) E Nava | 6 | 7 | 6^{5} | 4 | 7^{10}
WC | (France) K Jacquet | 2 | 5 | 7^{7} | 6 | 6^{6}
(France) B Bonzi | 0 | 7^{7} | 6 | 3 | 4
26 | (United Kingdom) C Norrie | 6 | 6^{2} | 4 | 6 | 6
18 | (Argentina) F Cerúndolo | 6 | 7^{7} | 6
PR | (China) Z Zhang | 3 | 6^{0} | 3
Q | (Canada) L Draxl | 5 | 0 | 4
(Bosnia and Herzegovina) D Džumhur | 7 | 6 | 6
LL | (Belgium) A Blockx | 3 | 6 | 3 | 4
Q | (Portugal) J Faria | 6 | 3 | 6 | 6
(Italy) M Arnaldi | 4 | 2 | 3
13 | A Rublev | 6 | 6 | 6

Second round
3 | (Germany) A Zverev | 6 | 4 | 6 | 6
(France) A Müller | 3 | 6 | 3 | 4
(United States) E Nava | 1 | 6^{3} | 6 | 6^{5}
26 | (United Kingdom) C Norrie | 6 | 7^{7} | 4 | 7^{7}
18 | (Argentina) F Cerúndolo | 6 | 6 | 6
(Bosnia and Herzegovina) D Džumhur | 3 | 2 | 1
Q | (Portugal) J Faria | 4 | 3 | 6 | 5
13 | A Rublev | 6 | 6 | 4 | 7

Third round
3 | (Germany) A Zverev | 7 | 4 | 6 | 6
26 | (United Kingdom) C Norrie | 5 | 6 | 3 | 1
18 | (Argentina) F Cerúndolo | 6 | 7^{7} | 6
13 | A Rublev | 3 | 6^{4} | 3

Fourth round
3 | (Germany) A Zverev | 6 | 6 | 6
18 | (Argentina) F Cerúndolo | 2 | 4 | 4

==== Section 4 ====
First round
11 | D Medvedev | 7 | 6 | 7^{7}
(Netherlands) J de Jong | 5 | 2 | 6^{2}
(France) Q Halys | 6 | 6 | 7^{7}
(Chile) A Tabilo | 2 | 2 | 6^{2}
(Poland) K Majchrzak | 7^{7} | 7 | 3 | 7^{7}
(United Kingdom) J Fearnley | 6^{2} | 5 | 6 | 6^{3}
(Hungary) F Marozsán | 6 | 6 | 6^{2} | 6
24 | (France) A Rinderknech | 3 | 4 | 7^{7} | 4
25 | (United States) L Tien | 7^{7} | 4 | 3 | 7^{7} | 6
(United States) M Giron | 6^{2} | 6 | 6 | 6^{3} | 2
Q | (Sweden) E Ymer | 6 | 5 | 4 | 1
(Kazakhstan) A Shevchenko | 3 | 7 | 6 | 6
(Argentina) JM Cerúndolo | 7^{7} | 5 | 1 | 1
WC | (Australia) J Thompson | 6^{3} | 7 | 6 | 6
(Portugal) N Borges | 3 | 6 | 6 | 0
7 | (Canada) F Auger-Aliassime | 6 | 4 | 4 | 0^{r}

Second round
11 | D Medvedev | 6^{9} | 6 | 6 | 6
(France) Q Halys | 7^{11} | 3 | 4 | 2
(Poland) K Majchrzak | 3 | 4 | 6^{5}
(Hungary) F Marozsán | 6 | 6 | 7^{7}
25 | (United States) L Tien | 6 | 5 | 6 | 6
(Kazakhstan) A Shevchenko | 2 | 7 | 1 | 0
WC | (Australia) J Thompson | 7^{11} | 3 | 2 | 4
(Portugal) N Borges | 6^{9} | 6 | 6 | 6

Third round
11 | D Medvedev | 6^{5} | 4 | 7 | 6 | 6
(Hungary) F Marozsán | 7^{7} | 6 | 5 | 0 | 3
25 | (United States) L Tien | 7^{11} | 6 | 6
(Portugal) N Borges | 6^{9} | 4 | 2

Fourth round
11 | D Medvedev | 4 | 0 | 3
25 | (United States) L Tien | 6 | 6 | 6

=== Bottom half ===
==== Section 5 ====
First round
5 | (Italy) L Musetti | 4 | 7^{7} | 7 | 3
(Belgium) R Collignon | 6 | 6^{3} | 5 | 2^{r}
(Italy) L Sonego | 6 | 6 | 6
(Spain) C Taberner | 4 | 0 | 3
(Bulgaria) G Dimitrov | 4 | 4 | 3
(Czech Republic) T Macháč | 6 | 6 | 6
(Japan) S Mochizuki | 6 | 3 | 2 | 2
31 | (Greece) S Tsitsipas | 4 | 6 | 6 | 6
17 | (Czech Republic) J Lehečka | 5 | 6^{1} | 5
Q | (France) A Géa | 7 | 7^{7} | 7
(Serbia) L Djere | 7 | 3 | 4 | 6^{4}
WC | (Switzerland) S Wawrinka | 5 | 6 | 6 | 7^{7}
(Czech Republic) V Kopřiva | 4 | 6 | 2 | 6 | 6
(Germany) J-L Struff | 6 | 2 | 6 | 3 | 1
(France) V Royer | 6^{5} | 7 | 1 | 3
9 | (United States) T Fritz | 7^{7} | 5 | 6 | 6

Second round
5 | (Italy) L Musetti | 6 | 6 | 6
(Italy) L Sonego | 3 | 3 | 4
(Czech Republic) T Macháč | 6 | 3 | 7^{7} | 7^{7}
31 | (Greece) S Tsitsipas | 4 | 6 | 6^{5} | 6^{5}
Q | (France) A Géa | 6 | 3 | 6 | 5 | 6^{3}
WC | (Switzerland) S Wawrinka | 4 | 6 | 3 | 7 | 7^{10}
(Czech Republic) V Kopřiva | 1 | 4 | 6^{4}
9 | (United States) T Fritz | 6 | 6 | 7^{7}

Third round
5 | (Italy) L Musetti | 5 | 6 | 6 | 5 | 6
(Czech Republic) T Macháč | 7 | 4 | 2 | 7 | 2
WC | (Switzerland) S Wawrinka | 6^{5} | 6 | 4 | 4
9 | (United States) T Fritz | 7^{7} | 2 | 6 | 6

Fourth round
5 | (Italy) L Musetti | 6 | 7 | 6
9 | (United States) T Fritz | 2 | 5 | 4

==== Section 6 ====
First round
16 | (Czech Republic) J Menšík | 7 | 4 | 2 | 7^{7} | 6
(Spain) P Carreño Busta | 5 | 6 | 6 | 6^{1} | 3
Q | (Japan) R Sakamoto | 6^{6} | 1 | 7 | 6 | 3
Q | (Spain) R Jódar | 7^{8} | 6 | 5 | 4 | 6
(Poland) H Hurkacz | 6^{6} | 7^{8} | 6 | 6
(Belgium) Z Bergs | 7^{8} | 6^{6} | 3 | 3
(United States) E Quinn | 6 | 6 | 6
23 | (Netherlands) T Griekspoor | 2 | 3 | 2
27 | (United States) B Nakashima | 3 | 6 | 6^{1} | 6^{3}
(Netherlands) B van de Zandschulp | 6 | 4 | 7^{7} | 7^{7}
PR | (China) J Shang | 6 | 6^{2} | 6 | 6
(Spain) R Bautista Agut | 4 | 7^{7} | 4 | 0
(France) T Atmane | 4 | 6 | 7^{7} | 1 | 1
Q | (Italy) F Maestrelli | 6 | 3 | 6^{4} | 6 | 6
(Spain) P Martínez | 3 | 2 | 2
4 | (Serbia) N Djokovic | 6 | 6 | 6

Second round
16 | (Czech Republic) J Menšík | 6 | 6 | 6
Q | (Spain) R Jódar | 2 | 4 | 4
(Poland) H Hurkacz | 4 | 6^{5} | 1
(United States) E Quinn | 6 | 7^{7} | 6
(Netherlands) B van de Zandschulp | 7^{8} | 6 | 6
PR | (China) J Shang | 6^{6} | 2 | 3
Q | (Italy) F Maestrelli | 3 | 2 | 2
4 | (Serbia) N Djokovic | 6 | 6 | 6

Third round
16 | (Czech Republic) J Menšík | 6 | 7^{7} | 7^{7}
(United States) E Quinn | 2 | 6^{5} | 6^{5}
(Netherlands) B van de Zandschulp | 3 | 4 | 6^{4}
4 | (Serbia) N Djokovic | 6 | 6 | 7^{7}

Fourth round
16 | (Czech Republic) J Menšík
4 | (Serbia) N Djokovic | w/o

==== Section 7 ====
First round
8 | (United States) B Shelton | 6 | 7^{7} | 7^{7}
(France) U Humbert | 3 | 6^{2} | 6^{5}
Q | (Australia) D Sweeny | 6^{3} | 7 | 6 | 7
(France) G Monfils | 7^{7} | 5 | 4 | 5
(France) A Mannarino | 3 | 3 | 1
WC | (Australia) R Hijikata | 6 | 6 | 6
Q | (United States) M Damm | 4 | 4 | 4
30 | (Monaco) V Vacherot | 6 | 6 | 6
21 | (Canada) D Shapovalov | 6 | 7^{7} | 6
WC | (China) Y Bu | 3 | 6^{1} | 1
(Germany) D Altmaier | 0 | 0 | 6^{5}
(Croatia) M Čilić | 6 | 6 | 7^{7}
(Spain) J Munar | 3 | 6 | 6^{5} | 7 | 6
(Czech Republic) D Svrčina | 6 | 2 | 7^{7} | 5 | 3
(Italy) M Bellucci | 1 | 2 | 4
12 | (Norway) C Ruud | 6 | 6 | 6

Second round
8 | (United States) B Shelton | 6 | 6 | 6
Q | (Australia) D Sweeny | 3 | 2 | 2
WC | (Australia) R Hijikata | 1 | 3 | 6 | 2
30 | (Monaco) V Vacherot | 6 | 6 | 4 | 6
21 | (Canada) D Shapovalov | 4 | 3 | 2
(Croatia) M Čilić | 6 | 6 | 6
(Spain) J Munar | 3 | 5 | 4
12 | (Norway) C Ruud | 6 | 7 | 6

Third round
8 | (United States) B Shelton | 6 | 6 | 7^{7}
30 | (Monaco) V Vacherot | 4 | 4 | 6^{5}
(Croatia) M Čilić | 4 | 4 | 6 | 5
12 | (Norway) C Ruud | 6 | 6 | 3 | 7

Fourth round
8 | (United States) B Shelton | 3 | 6 | 6 | 6
12 | (Norway) C Ruud | 6 | 4 | 3 | 4

==== Section 8 ====
First round
15 | K Khachanov | 4 | 6 | 6 | 5 | 6
(United States) A Michelsen | 6 | 4 | 3 | 7 | 3
WC | (Australia) C O'Connell | 6 | 6^{7} | 7^{7} | 2 | 3
Q | (United States) N Basavareddy | 4 | 7^{9} | 6^{3} | 6 | 6
(France) G Mpetshi Perricard | 4 | 4 | 6 | 7 | 3
(Argentina) S Báez | 6 | 6 | 3 | 5 | 6
(Chile) C Garín | 6^{5} | 5 | 6^{3}
22 | (Italy) L Darderi | 7^{7} | 7 | 7^{7}
28 | (Brazil) J Fonseca | 4 | 6 | 1 | 2
(United States) E Spizzirri | 6 | 2 | 6 | 6
(Italy) L Nardi | 5 | 6 | 4 | 2
Q | (China) Y Wu | 7 | 4 | 6 | 6
WC | (Australia) J Duckworth | 7^{7} | 3 | 1 | 7 | 6
LL | (Croatia) D Prižmić | 6^{4} | 6 | 6 | 5 | 3
(France) H Gaston | 2 | 1 | 0^{r}
2 | (Italy) J Sinner | 6 | 6 | 0

Second round
15 | K Khachanov | 6 | 6 | 6
Q | (United States) N Basavareddy | 1 | 4 | 3
(Argentina) S Báez | 3 | 6 | 4 | 3
22 | (Italy) L Darderi | 6 | 1 | 6 | 6
(United States) E Spizzirri | 6 | 6 | 6^{4} | 4 | 6
Q | (China) Y Wu | 2 | 4 | 7^{7} | 6 | 3
WC | (Australia) J Duckworth | 1 | 4 | 2
2 | (Italy) J Sinner | 6 | 6 | 6

Third round
15 | K Khachanov | 6^{5} | 6 | 3 | 4
22 | (Italy) L Darderi | 7^{7} | 3 | 6 | 6
(United States) E Spizzirri | 6 | 3 | 4 | 4
2 | (Italy) J Sinner | 4 | 6 | 6 | 6

Fourth round
22 | (Italy) L Darderi | 1 | 3 | 6^{2}
2 | (Italy) J Sinner | 6 | 6 | 7^{7}

== Seeded players ==
The following are the seeded players, based on ATP rankings as of 12 January 2026. Rankings and points before are as of 19 January 2026.

Because the tournament takes place one week later this year, points defending also include the tournament that took place during the week of 27 January 2025 (Montpellier), which will be replaced by the player's next best result.

| ^{‡} | Champion |
| ^{†} | Runner-up |

| Seed | Rank | Player | Points before | Points defending | Points won | Points after | Status |
|---|---|---|---|---|---|---|---|
| 1 | 1 | (Spain) Carlos Alcaraz^{‡} | 12,050 | 400 | 2,000 | 13,650 | Champion, defeated (Serbia) Novak Djokovic [4] |
| 2 | 2 | (Italy) Jannik Sinner | 11,500 | 2,000 | 800 | 10,300 | Semifinals lost to (Serbia) Novak Djokovic [4] |
| 3 | 3 | (Germany) Alexander Zverev | 5,105 | 1,300 | 800 | 4,605 | Semifinals lost to (Spain) Carlos Alcaraz [1] |
| 4 | 4 | (Serbia) Novak Djokovic^{†} | 4,780 | 800 | 1,300 | 5,280 | Runner-up, lost to (Spain) Carlos Alcaraz [1] |
| 5 | 5 | (Italy) Lorenzo Musetti | 4,105 | 100 | 400 | 4,405 | Quarterfinals retired against (Serbia) Novak Djokovic [4] |
| 6 | 6 | (Australia) Alex de Minaur | 4,080 | 400 | 400 | 4,080 | Quarterfinals lost to (Spain) Carlos Alcaraz [1] |
| 7 | 8 | (Canada) Félix Auger-Aliassime | 3,990 | 50+250 | 10+25 | 3,725 | First round retired against (Portugal) Nuno Borges |
| 8 | 7 | (United States) Ben Shelton | 4,000 | 800 | 400 | 3,600 | Quarterfinals lost to (Italy) Jannik Sinner [2] |
| 9 | 9 | (United States) Taylor Fritz | 3,840 | 100 | 200 | 3,940 | Fourth round lost to (Italy) Lorenzo Musetti [5] |
| 10 | 10 | (Kazakhstan) Alexander Bublik | 3,065 | 10+50 | 200+30 | 3,235 | Fourth round lost to (Australia) Alex de Minaur [6] |
| 11 | 12 | Daniil Medvedev | 2,910 | 50 | 200 | 3,060 | Fourth round lost to (United States) Learner Tien [25] |
| 12 | 13 | (Norway) Casper Ruud | 2,795 | 50 | 200 | 2,945 | Fourth round lost to (United States) Ben Shelton [8] |
| 13 | 15 | Andrey Rublev | 2,600 | 10+100 | 100+10 | 2,600 | Third round lost to (Argentina) Francisco Cerúndolo [18] |
| 14 | 14 | (Spain) Alejandro Davidovich Fokina | 2,635 | 200 | 100 | 2,535 | Third round retired against (United States) Tommy Paul [19] |
| 15 | 18 | Karen Khachanov | 2,320 | 100 | 100 | 2,320 | Third round lost to (Italy) Luciano Darderi [22] |
| 16 | 17 | (Czech Republic) Jakub Menšík | 2,345 | 50 | 200 | 2,495 | Fourth round withdrew due to abdominal tear |
| 17 | 19 | (Czech Republic) Jiří Lehečka | 2,090 | 200 | 10 | 1,900 | First round lost to (France) Arthur Géa [Q] |
| 18 | 21 | (Argentina) Francisco Cerúndolo | 2,035 | 100 | 200 | 2,135 | Fourth round lost to (Germany) Alexander Zverev [3] |
| 19 | 20 | (United States) Tommy Paul | 2,050 | 400 | 200 | 1,850 | Fourth round lost to (Spain) Carlos Alcaraz [1] |
| 20 | 22 | (Italy) Flavio Cobolli | 1,955 | 10 | 10 | 1,955 | First round lost to (United Kingdom) Arthur Fery [Q] |
| 21 | 23 | (Canada) Denis Shapovalov | 1,650 | 50 | 50 | 1,650 | Second round lost to (Croatia) Marin Čilić |
| 22 | 25 | (Italy) Luciano Darderi | 1,599 | 10 | 200 | 1,789 | Fourth round lost to (Italy) Jannik Sinner [2] |
| 23 | 26 | (Netherlands) Tallon Griekspoor | 1,565 | 10 | 10 | 1,565 | First round lost to (United States) Ethan Quinn |
| 24 | 28 | (France) Arthur Rinderknech | 1,551 | 10+25 | 10+16 | 1,542 | First round lost to (Hungary) Fábián Marozsán |
| 25 | 29 | (United States) Learner Tien | 1,540 | 230 | 400 | 1,710 | Quarterfinals lost to (Germany) Alexander Zverev [3] |
| 26 | 27 | (United Kingdom) Cameron Norrie | 1,553 | 10 | 100 | 1,643 | Third round lost to (Germany) Alexander Zverev [3] |
| 27 | 30 | (United States) Brandon Nakashima | 1,535 | 10 | 10 | 1,535 | First round lost to (Netherlands) Botic van de Zandschulp |
| 28 | 32 | (Brazil) João Fonseca | 1,510 | 80 | 10 | 1,440 | First round lost to (United States) Eliot Spizzirri |
| 29 | 34 | (United States) Frances Tiafoe | 1,500 | 50 | 100 | 1,550 | Third round lost to (Australia) Alex de Minaur [6] |
| 30 | 31 | (Monaco) Valentin Vacherot | 1,519 | 8 | 100 | 1,611 | Third round lost to (United States) Ben Shelton [8] |
| 31 | 35 | (Greece) Stefanos Tsitsipas | 1,455 | 10 | 50 | 1,495 | Second round lost to (Czech Republic) Tomáš Macháč |
| 32 | 37 | (France) Corentin Moutet | 1,383 | 100 | 100 | 1,383 | Third round lost to (Spain) Carlos Alcaraz [1] |

Withdrawn seeded players

The following players would have been seeded but withdrew before the tournament began.

| Rank | Player | Points before | Points defending | Points after | Withdrawal reason |
|---|---|---|---|---|---|
| 11 | (United Kingdom) Jack Draper | 2,990 | 200 | 2,790 | Left arm injury |
| 16 | (Denmark) Holger Rune | 2,580 | 200 | 2,380 | Left achilles tendon injury |

== Other entry information ==
=== Wildcards ===
The following players received wildcards into the men's singles main draw:

- (China) Bu Yunchaokete
- (Australia) James Duckworth
- (Australia) Rinky Hijikata
- (France) Kyrian Jacquet
- (United States) Patrick Kypson
- (Australia) Christopher O'Connell
- (Australia) Jordan Thompson
- (Switzerland) Stan Wawrinka

=== Protected ranking ===
- (China) Shang Juncheng (54)
- (China) Zhang Zhizhen (60)

=== Qualifiers ===
- (United States) Nishesh Basavareddy
- (Norway) Nicolai Budkov Kjær
- (United States) Martin Damm
- (Canada) Liam Draxl
- (Portugal) Jaime Faria
- (United Kingdom) Arthur Fery
- (France) Arthur Géa
- (Spain) Rafael Jódar
- (Australia) Jason Kubler
- (Italy) Francesco Maestrelli
- (Japan) Rei Sakamoto
- (United States) Zachary Svajda
- (Australia) Dane Sweeny
- (China) Wu Yibing
- (Sweden) Elias Ymer
- (United States) Michael Zheng

=== Lucky losers ===
- (Belgium) Alexander Blockx
- (United States) Mackenzie McDonald
- (Croatia) Dino Prižmić

=== Withdrawals ===
The entry list was released based on the ATP rankings for the week of 17 November 2025, rather than the usual cutoff date of 8 December 2025.

- † (Denmark) Holger Rune (15) → replaced by (Argentina) Thiago Agustín Tirante (101)
- ‡ (United Kingdom) Jack Draper (10) → replaced by (Czech Republic) Vít Kopřiva (102)
- ‡ (France) Arthur Fils (40) → replaced by (Spain) Carlos Taberner (103)
- ‡ (Finland) Emil Ruusuvuori (83 PR) → replaced by (Germany) Yannick Hanfmann (104)
- ‡ (Australia) Thanasi Kokkinakis (84 PR) → replaced by (Croatia) Dino Prižmić (LL)
- § (France) Arthur Cazaux (67) → replaced by (Belgium) Alexander Blockx (LL)
- § (Italy) Matteo Berrettini (56) → replaced by (United States) Mackenzie McDonald (LL)

† – not included on entry list
‡ – withdrew from entry list
§ – withdrew from main draw

| Preceded by 2025 US Open – Men's singles | Grand Slam men's singles | Succeeded by 2026 French Open – Men's singles |
