= 2021 Charlottesville Men's Pro Challenger – Doubles =

Doubles
- 2021 Charlottesville Men's Pro Challenger

Final
- Champions: (United States) William Blumberg (United States) Max Schnur
- Runners-up: (Philippines) Treat Huey (Denmark) Frederik Nielsen
- Score: 3–6, 6–1, [14–12]

Events
Singles	Doubles
- Charlottesville Men's Pro Challenger

Mitchell Krueger and Blaž Rola were the defending champions but lost in the first round to William Blumberg and Max Schnur.

Blumberg and Schnur won the title after defeating Treat Huey and Frederik Nielsen 3–6, 6–1, [14–12] in the final.

== Seeds ==
1. (United States) Nathaniel Lammons / (United States) Jackson Withrow (quarterfinals)
2. (Mexico) Hans Hach Verdugo / (Mexico) Miguel Ángel Reyes-Varela (first round)
3. (Philippines) Treat Huey / (Denmark) Frederik Nielsen (final)
4. (United States) Robert Galloway / (United States) Alex Lawson (semifinals)

== Draw ==
Key

- Q = Qualifier
- WC = Wild card
- LL = Lucky loser
- Alt = Alternate
- ITF = ITF entry
- PR = Protected ranking
- SR = Special ranking
- SE = Special exempt
- JE = Junior exempt
- JR = Junior Accelerator Programme entrant
- CO = College Accelerator Programme entrant
- NG = Next Gen Accelerator Program entrant
- w/o = Walkover
- r = Retired
- d = Defaulted

First round
1	(United States) N Lammons (United States) J Withrow	6	6
(United States) C Harrison (United States) H Reese	4	4
(United States) M Krueger (Slovenia) B Rola	3	2
(United States) W Blumberg (United States) M Schnur	6	6
4	(United States) R Galloway (United States) A Lawson	4	6	[10]
(Philippines) R Gonzales (United States) H Johnson	6	3	[4]
(Japan) T Daniel (Japan) Y Uchiyama	6	7
WC	(United States) Ed Nava (United States) Em Nava	2	5
(United States) D Kudla (United States) T-S Kwiatkowski	6	6
WC	(United States) Alexander Kiefer (Luxembourg) C Rodesch	1	3
(United States) JC Aragone (United States) D Novikov	4	1
3	(Philippines) T Huey (Denmark) F Nielsen	6	6
Alt	(Netherlands) G Brouwer (United States) R Stalder	6	6^{4}	[7]
(India) A Kadhe (Kazakhstan) D Popko	2	7^{7}	[10]
(Chinese Taipei) J Jung (Indonesia) C Rungkat	7^{7}	6
2	(Mexico) H Hach Verdugo (Mexico) MÁ Reyes-Varela	6^{4}	3

Quarterfinals
1	(United States) N Lammons (United States) J Withrow	3	6^{6}
(United States) W Blumberg (United States) M Schnur	6	7^{8}
4	(United States) R Galloway (United States) A Lawson	6	6
(Japan) T Daniel (Japan) Y Uchiyama	2	2
(United States) D Kudla (United States) T-S Kwiatkowski	5	3
3	(Philippines) T Huey (Denmark) F Nielsen	7	6
(India) A Kadhe (Kazakhstan) D Popko	2	5
(Chinese Taipei) J Jung (Indonesia) C Rungkat	6	7

Semifinals
(United States) W Blumberg (United States) M Schnur	6	6
4	(United States) R Galloway (United States) A Lawson	4	1
3	(Philippines) T Huey (Denmark) F Nielsen	6	6
(Chinese Taipei) J Jung (Indonesia) C Rungkat	3	3

Final
(United States) W Blumberg (United States) M Schnur	3	6	[14]
3	(Philippines) T Huey (Denmark) F Nielsen	6	1	[12]
