= Château Lafon-Rochet =

Winery in Bordeaux, France

Coordinates: 45.22941°N 0.78777°W

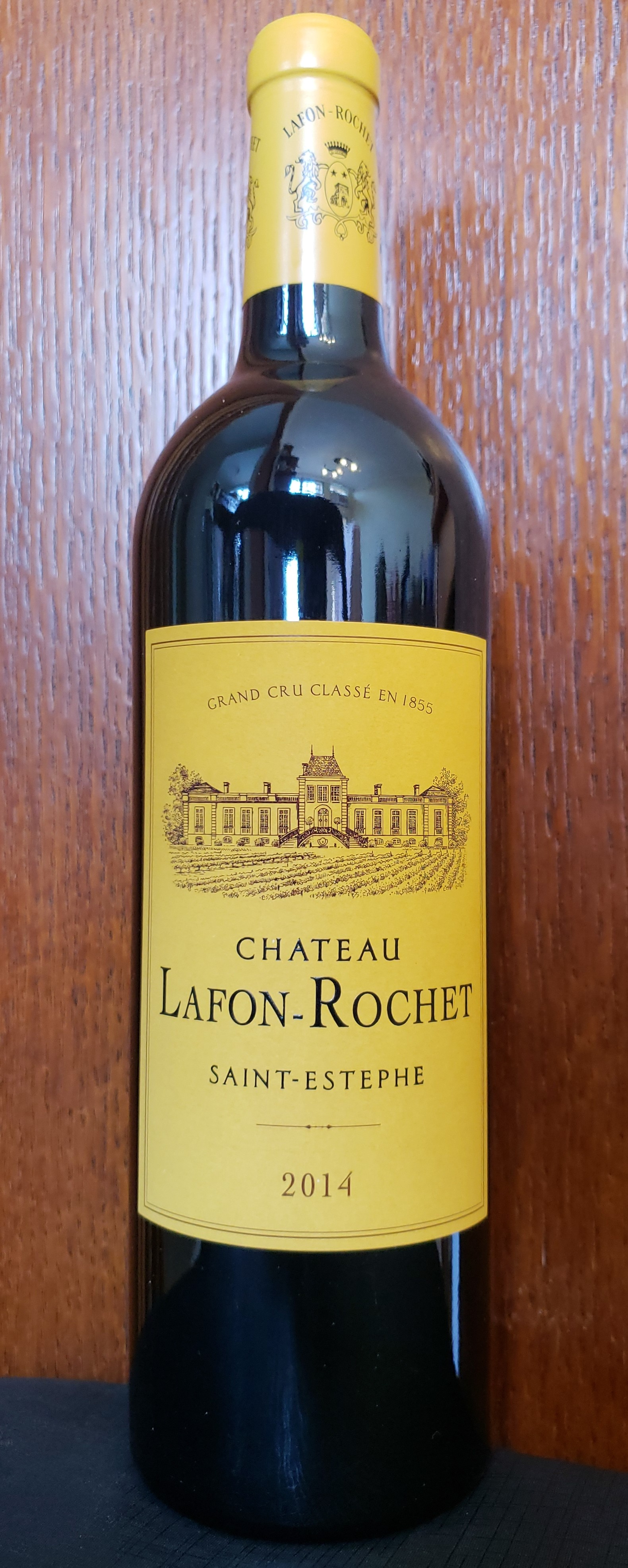
Grand Vin 2014

Grand Vin 1998

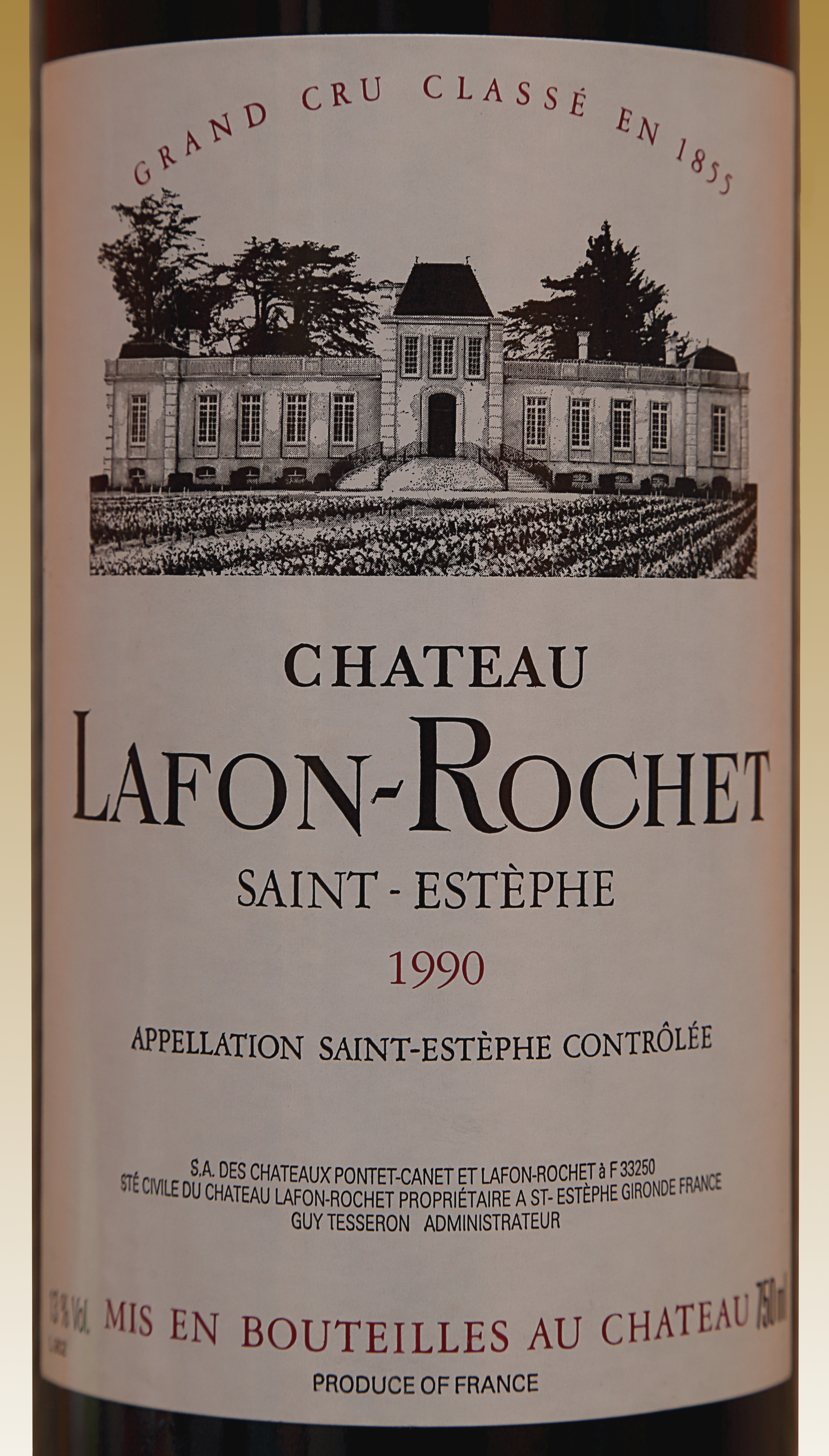

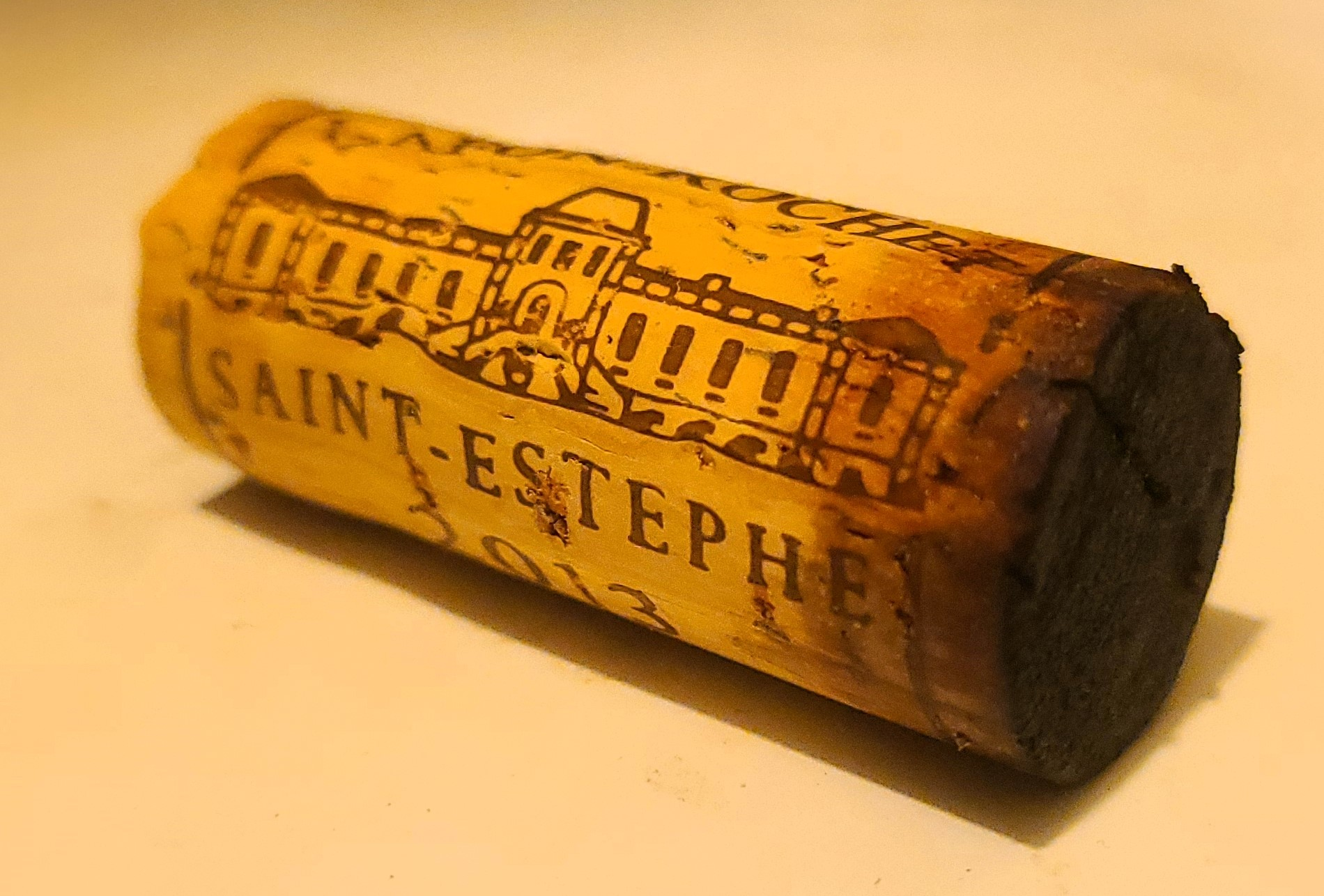
Cork of 2013

Château Lafon-Rochet is a winery in the Saint-Estèphe appellation of the Bordeaux region of France. The wine produced here was classified as one of ten Quatrièmes Crus (Fourth Growths) in the historic Bordeaux Wine Official Classification of 1855. The Chateau has 111 acres (45 ha) planted with Cabernet Sauvignon, Merlot, Cabernet Franc and Petit Verdot. A second wine is produced under the label Les Pelerins de Lafon-Rochet. The Chateau is owned by the Tesseron family who made their fortune in the Cognac trade and also own Château Pontet-Canet.

Purchased by Guy Tesseron in the 1960s, it was the first Médoc chateau to be rebuilt in the 20th century.

== Wine ==
Lafon-Rochet previously had a reputation for very tough, tannic wines. In recent vintages, the increase usage of Merlot has soften the blend.
