= 2026 BNC Tennis Open =

- Date: 5 – 10 January
- Edition: 21st
- Surface: Hard
- Location: Nouméa, New Caledonia

Champions

Singles
- (France) Arthur Géa

Doubles
- (Japan) Yusuke Kusuhara / (Japan) Shunsuke Nakagawa
- BNC Tennis Open

The 2026 BNC Tennis Open was a professional tennis tournament played on hardcourts. It was the 21st edition of the tournament which was part of the 2026 ATP Challenger Tour. It took place in Nouméa, New Caledonia between 5 and 10 January 2026.

== Singles main-draw entrants ==
=== Seeds ===
Country	Player	Rank^{1}	Seed
AUS	Jordan Thompson	108	1
CAN	Liam Draxl	133	2
FRA	Titouan Droguet	153	3
FRA	Pierre-Hugues Herbert	155	4
AUT	Jurij Rodionov	176	5
USA	Michael Zheng	188	6
ARG	Alex Barrena	191	7
AUS	Bernard Tomic	192	8

- ^{1} Rankings are as of 29 December 2025.

=== Other entrants ===
The following players received wildcards into the singles main draw:

- (France) Louis Dussin
- (Belgium) Gauthier Onclin
- (Northern Mariana Islands) Colin Sinclair

The following player received entry into the singles main draw as an alternate:

- (France) Maxime Chazal

The following players received entry from the qualifying draw:

- (Australia) Jake Delaney
- (United Kingdom) Emile Hudd
- (United States) Nicolas Moreno de Alboran
- (Japan) Kosuke Ogura
- (Japan) Leo Vithoontien
- (New Zealand) James Watt

== Champions ==
=== Singles ===
- (France) Arthur Géa def. (Austria) Jurij Rodionov 6–3, 4–6, 7–5.

=== Doubles ===
(Japan) Yusuke Kusuhara / (Japan) Shunsuke Nakagawa def. (Australia) Jake Delaney / (Australia) Calum Puttergill 7–5, 6–3.
