= 2026 BNC Tennis Open – Singles =

Singles
- 2026 BNC Tennis Open

Final
- Champion: (France) Arthur Géa
- Runner-up: (Austria) Jurij Rodionov
- Score: 6–3, 4–6, 7–5

Events
Singles	Doubles
- BNC Tennis Open

Shintaro Mochizuki was the defending champion but chose not to defend his title.

Arthur Géa won the title after defeating Jurij Rodionov 6–3, 4–6, 7–5 in the final.

== Seeds ==
1. (Australia) Jordan Thompson (quarterfinals)
2. (Canada) Liam Draxl (quarterfinals)
3. (France) Titouan Droguet (second round)
4. (France) Pierre-Hugues Herbert (first round)
5. (Austria) Jurij Rodionov (final)
6. (United States) Michael Zheng (semifinals)
7. (Argentina) Alex Barrena (first round)
8. (Australia) Bernard Tomic (quarterfinals)

== Draw ==
Key

- Q = Qualifier
- WC = Wild card
- LL = Lucky loser
- Alt = Alternate
- ITF = ITF entry
- PR = Protected ranking
- SR = Special ranking
- SE = Special exempt
- JE = Junior exempt
- JR = Junior Accelerator Programme entrant
- CO = College Accelerator Programme entrant
- NG = Next Gen Accelerator Program entrant
- w/o = Walkover
- r = Retired
- d = Defaulted

=== Finals ===
Semifinals
5	(Austria) Jurij Rodionov	6	6^{5}	6
(Australia) Blake Ellis	4	7^{7}	3
6	(United States) Michael Zheng	6	1	4
(France) Arthur Géa	4	6	6

Final
5	(Austria) Jurij Rodionov	3	6	5
(France) Arthur Géa	6	4	7

=== Top half ===
First round
1	(Australia) J Thompson	6	7^{7}
Q	(United Kingdom) Emile Hudd	3	6^{5}
Q	(United States) N Moreno de Alboran	6	7^{8}
Alt	(France) M Chazal	4	6^{6}
(United States) Christian Langmo	6	6
Q	(Japan) Kosuke Ogura	4	4
(Switzerland) H Bernet	4	6	0
5	(Austria) J Rodionov	6	3	6
4	(France) P-H Herbert	5	6	4
(Australia) B Ellis	7	4	6
(United States) Andre Ilagan	6	6^{5}	7^{8}
Q	(Australia) Ja Delaney	4	7^{7}	6^{6}
Q	(Japan) Leo Vithoontien	6^{5}	1
Q	(New Zealand) J Watt	7^{7}	6
(Estonia) D Glinka	4	3
8	(Australia) B Tomic	6	6

Second round
1	(Australia) J Thompson	6	6
Q	(United States) N Moreno de Alboran	4	3
(United States) C Langmo	3	4
5	(Austria) J Rodionov	6	6
(Australia) B Ellis	7^{7}	7^{7}
(United States) A Ilagan	6^{5}	6^{4}
Q	(New Zealand) J Watt	4	6	1^{r}
8	(Australia) B Tomic	6	3	4

Quarterfinals
1	(Australia) J Thompson	4	4
5	(Austria) J Rodionov	6	6
(Australia) B Ellis	7^{7}	3	6
8	(Australia) B Tomic	6^{4}	6	4

Semifinals
5	(Austria) J Rodionov	6	6^{5}	6
(Australia) B Ellis	4	7^{7}	3

=== Bottom half ===
First round
6	(United States) M Zheng	6	6
(Australia) O Jasika	4	2
WC	(Northern Mariana Islands) C Sinclair	3	7^{7}	2
(France) D Added	6	6^{4}	6
(France) C Tabur	4	6	6
(Brazil) T Seyboth Wild	6	1	4
WC	(Belgium) G Onclin	3	2
3	(France) T Droguet	6	6
7	(Argentina) A Barrena	4	0
(France) A Géa	6	6
(Argentina) F Díaz Acosta	6	6
WC	(France) Louis Dussin	2	3
(United Kingdom) R Peniston	6	6^{9}	4
(Australia) M Bouzige	4	7^{11}	6
(Brazil) G Heide	6^{5}	6	3
2	(Canada) L Draxl	7^{7}	3	6

Second round
6	(United States) M Zheng	6	6
(France) D Added	2	1
(France) C Tabur	6^{4}	6	6
3	(France) T Droguet	7^{7}	4	4
(France) A Géa	7^{7}	6
(Argentina) F Díaz Acosta	6^{5}	3
(Australia) M Bouzige	4	2
2	(Canada) L Draxl	6	6

Quarterfinals
6	(United States) M Zheng	3	6	6
(France) C Tabur	6	4	2
(France) A Géa	6	6
2	(Canada) L Draxl	3	2

Semifinals
6	(United States) M Zheng	6	1	4
(France) A Géa	4	6	6
