= 2026 BNC Tennis Open – Doubles =

Doubles
- 2026 BNC Tennis Open

Final
- Champions: (Japan) Yusuke Kusuhara (Japan) Shunsuke Nakagawa
- Runners-up: (Australia) Jake Delaney (Australia) Calum Puttergill
- Score: 7–5, 6–3

Events
Singles	Doubles
- BNC Tennis Open

Blake Bayldon and Colin Sinclair were the defending champions but only Sinclair chose to defend his title, partnering Daisuke Sumizawa. They lost in the quarterfinals to Finn Reynolds and James Watt.

Yusuke Kusuhara and Shunsuke Nakagawa won the title after defeating Jake Delaney and Calum Puttergill 7–5, 6–3 in the final.

== Seeds ==
1. (France) Pierre-Hugues Herbert / (Australia) Jordan Thompson (semifinals, withdrew)
2. (New Zealand) Finn Reynolds / (New Zealand) James Watt (semifinals)
3. (Japan) Yusuke Kusuhara / (Japan) Shunsuke Nakagawa (champions)
4. (Australia) Jake Delaney / (Australia) Calum Puttergill (final)

== Draw ==
Key

- Q = Qualifier
- WC = Wild card
- LL = Lucky loser
- Alt = Alternate
- ITF = ITF entry
- PR = Protected ranking
- SR = Special ranking
- SE = Special exempt
- JE = Junior exempt
- JR = Junior Accelerator Programme entrant
- CO = College Accelerator Programme entrant
- NG = Next Gen Accelerator Program entrant
- w/o = Walkover
- r = Retired
- d = Defaulted

First round
1	(France) P-H Herbert (Australia) J Thompson	6	6
(Australia) Adrian Arcon (Spain) Oscar José Gutierrez	2	0
(Australia) Ethan Cook (Australia) Tai Sach	6	7
(United States) Andre Ilagan (United States) E Zhu	4	5
4	(Australia) Ja Delaney (Australia) C Puttergill	5	6	[10]
(Australia) Je Delaney (Australia) B Ellis	7	4	[8]
(France) M Chazal (France) Louis Dussin	4	2
(United Kingdom) Emile Hudd (Australia) M Hulme	6	6
WC	(France) Louam Boivin (France) Nell Rollin	0	1
(Japan) Kosuke Ogura (Japan) Leo Vithoontien	6	6
(United States) Christian Langmo (Australia) B Tomic	6^{6}	7	[14]
3	(Japan) Y Kusuhara (Japan) S Nakagawa	7^{8}	5	[16]
(United States) Preston Brown (Australia) Arjun Mehrotra	5	4
(Northern Mariana Islands) C Sinclair (Japan) Daisuke Sumizawa	7	6
WC	(Australia) Jack Bruce-Smith (Pacific Oceania) Antoine Voisin	3	2
2	(New Zealand) F Reynolds (New Zealand) J Watt	6	6

Quarterfinals
1	(France) P-H Herbert (Australia) J Thompson	4	6	[10]
(Australia) E Cook (Australia) T Sach	6	3	[7]
4	(Australia) Ja Delaney (Australia) C Puttergill	6^{1}	6	[10]
(United Kingdom) E Hudd (Australia) M Hulme	7^{7}	3	[6]
(Japan) K Ogura (Japan) L Vithoontien	4	5
3	(Japan) Y Kusuhara (Japan) S Nakagawa	6	7
(Northern Mariana Islands) C Sinclair (Japan) D Sumizawa	7^{7}	3	[5]
2	(New Zealand) F Reynolds (New Zealand) J Watt	6^{4}	6	[10]

Semifinals
1	(France) P-H Herbert (Australia) J Thompson
4	(Australia) Ja Delaney (Australia) C Puttergill	w/o
3	(Japan) Y Kusuhara (Japan) S Nakagawa	7^{7}	4	[10]
2	(New Zealand) F Reynolds (New Zealand) J Watt	6^{4}	6	[7]

Final
4	(Australia) Ja Delaney (Australia) C Puttergill	5	3
3	(Japan) Y Kusuhara (Japan) S Nakagawa	7	6
