= 2021 Charlottesville Men's Pro Challenger – Singles =

Singles
- 2021 Charlottesville Men's Pro Challenger

Final
- Champion: (United States) Stefan Kozlov
- Runner-up: (Australia) Aleksandar Vukic
- Score: 6–2, 6–3

Events
Singles	Doubles
- Charlottesville Men's Pro Challenger

Vasek Pospisil was the defending champion but lost in the first round to Emilio Nava.

Stefan Kozlov won the title after defeating Aleksandar Vukic 6–2, 6–3 in the final.

== Seeds ==
1. (Canada) Vasek Pospisil (first round)
2. (Japan) Taro Daniel (first round)
3. (United States) Mitchell Krueger (first round)
4. (United States) Jack Sock (quarterfinals)
5. (Kazakhstan) Dmitry Popko (first round)
6. (Chinese Taipei) Jason Jung (first round)
7. (United States) Bjorn Fratangelo (first round)
8. (Slovenia) Blaž Rola (first round)

== Draw ==
Key

- Q = Qualifier
- WC = Wild card
- LL = Lucky loser
- Alt = Alternate
- ITF = ITF entry
- PR = Protected ranking
- SR = Special ranking
- SE = Special exempt
- JE = Junior exempt
- JR = Junior Accelerator Programme entrant
- CO = College Accelerator Programme entrant
- NG = Next Gen Accelerator Program entrant
- w/o = Walkover
- r = Retired
- d = Defaulted

=== Finals ===
Semifinals
Alt	(United States) Stefan Kozlov	6	6^{1}	6
(United States) J. J. Wolf	1	7^{7}	0
(Australia) Aleksandar Vukic	6	6
(Canada) Brayden Schnur	4	1

Final
Alt	(United States) Stefan Kozlov	6	6
(Australia) Aleksandar Vukic	2	3

=== Top half ===
First round
1	(Canada) V Pospisil	4	6	6^{3}
WC	(United States) Em Nava	6	4	7^{7}
(Japan) T Ito	6^{0}	5
Alt	(Japan) G Soeda	7^{7}	7
WC	(Switzerland) Jeffrey von der Schulenburg	6^{5}	5
(Australia) J Kubler	7^{7}	7
Alt	(United States) S Kozlov	7	6
7	(United States) B Fratangelo	5	2
3	(United States) M Krueger	3	2
Q	(United States) D Kudla	6	6
(United States) J. J. Wolf	7	6
WC	(United States) M Damm	5	4
Alt	(Japan) Yo Watanuki	6	2	6
(United States) C Eubanks	2	6	4
(United States) T-S Kwiatkowski	7^{7}	2	7
8	(Slovenia) B Rola	6^{3}	6	5

Second round
WC	(United States) Em Nava	2	7^{7}	6
Alt	(Japan) G Soeda	6	6^{5}	2
(Australia) J Kubler	3	1
Alt	(United States) S Kozlov	6	6
Q	(United States) D Kudla	2	6^{5}
(United States) J. J. Wolf	6	7^{7}
Alt	(Japan) Yo Watanuki	6^{4}	1
(United States) T-S Kwiatkowski	7^{7}	6

Quarterfinals
WC	(United States) Em Nava	4	2
Alt	(United States) S Kozlov	6	6
(United States) J. J. Wolf	7	6
(United States) T-S Kwiatkowski	5	4

Semifinals
Alt	(United States) S Kozlov	6	6^{1}	6
(United States) J. J. Wolf	1	7^{7}	0

=== Bottom half ===
First round
5	(Kazakhstan) D Popko	3	5
(Australia) A Vukic	6	7
Q	(United States) N Chappell	4	3
Alt	(Chinese Taipei) T-l Wu	6	6
(Germany) C-M Stebe	6	6^{1}	6
(United States) M Mmoh	4	7^{7}	2
(Denmark) M Torpegaard	4	4
4	(United States) J Sock	6	6
6	(Chinese Taipei) J Jung	5	4
Q	(United States) C Harrison	7	6
(Japan) Y Uchiyama	6	2	0
(Canada) B Schnur	2	6	6
Q	(Spain) I Montes de la Torre	6	4	7^{7}
PR	(Canada) P Polansky	3	6	6^{5}
(India) P Gunneswaran	6^{2}	7^{7}	6
2	(Japan) T Daniel	7^{7}	6^{5}	2

Second round
(Australia) A Vukic	3	6	6
Alt	(Chinese Taipei) T-l Wu	6	3	2
(Germany) C-M Stebe	2	3
4	(United States) J Sock	6	6
Q	(United States) C Harrison	6^{1}	7^{7}	6^{6}
(Canada) B Schnur	7^{7}	6^{4}	7^{8}
Q	(Spain) I Montes de la Torre	1	5
(India) P Gunneswaran	6	7

Quarterfinals
(Australia) A Vukic	6	7
4	(United States) J Sock	4	5
(Canada) B Schnur	7	6
(India) P Gunneswaran	5	3

Semifinals
(Australia) A Vukic	6	6
(Canada) B Schnur	4	1
