= 2021 Charlottesville Men's Pro Challenger =

- Date: 1–7 November
- Edition: 12th
- Surface: Hard (indoor)
- Location: Charlottesville, United States

Champions

Singles
- (United States) Stefan Kozlov

Doubles
- (United States) William Blumberg / (United States) Max Schnur
- Charlottesville Men's Pro Challenger

The 2021 Jonathan Fried Pro Challenger was a professional tennis tournament played on indoor hardcourts. It was the twelfth edition of the tournament which was part of the 2021 ATP Challenger Tour, taking place in Charlottesville, United States from November 1 to 7, 2021.

== Singles main-draw entrants ==
=== Seeds ===
Country	Player	Rank^{1}	Seed
CAN	Vasek Pospisil	85	1
JPN	Taro Daniel	120	2
USA	Mitchell Krueger	147	3
USA	Jack Sock	152	4
KAZ	Dmitry Popko	162	5
TPE	Jason Jung	166	6
USA	Bjorn Fratangelo	172	7
SLO	Blaž Rola	177	8

- ^{1} Rankings are as of 25 October 2021.

=== Other entrants ===
The following players received wildcards into the singles main draw:

- (United States) Martin Damm
- (United States) Emilio Nava
- (Switzerland) Jeffrey von der Schulenburg

The following player received entry into the singles main draw using a protected ranking:

- (Canada) Peter Polansky

The following players received entry into the singles main draw as alternates:

- (United States) Stefan Kozlov
- (Japan) Go Soeda
- (Japan) Yosuke Watanuki
- (Chinese Taipei) Wu Tung-lin

The following players received entry from the qualifying draw:

- (United States) Nick Chappell
- (United States) Christian Harrison
- (United States) Denis Kudla
- (Spain) Iñaki Montes de la Torre

== Champions ==
=== Singles ===
- (United States) Stefan Kozlov def. (Australia) Aleksandar Vukic 6–2, 6–3.

=== Doubles ===
- (United States) William Blumberg / (United States) Max Schnur def. (Philippines) Treat Huey / (Denmark) Frederik Nielsen 3–6, 6–1, [14–12].
