= Château Pontet-Canet =

Winery in France

Coordinates: 45.20833°N 0.77053°W

Château Pontet-Canet is a winery in the Pauillac appellation of the Bordeaux wine region of France. Chateau Pontet-Canet is also the name of the red wine produced by this property. The wine produced here was classified as one of eighteen Cinquièmes Crus (Fifth Growths) in the Bordeaux Wine Official Classification of 1855.

== History ==
Ten years following the 1855 classification, the property was purchased by Herman Cruse in 1865, in whose family the estate remained for many years. The Bordeaux wine fraud scandal in 1973 forced the sale, in 1975, of Ponet-Canet to Cognac merchant Guy Tesseron owner of Château Lafon-Rochet. The estate remains in his control today.

== Production ==
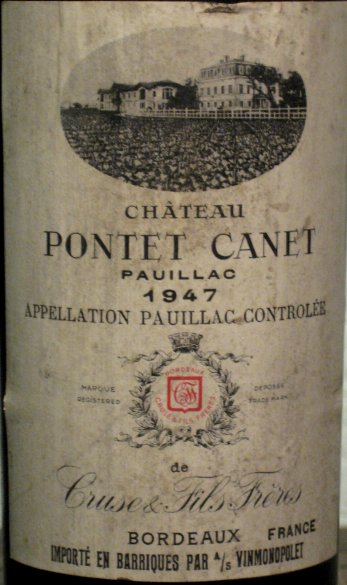
The aged label of a Château Pontet Canet

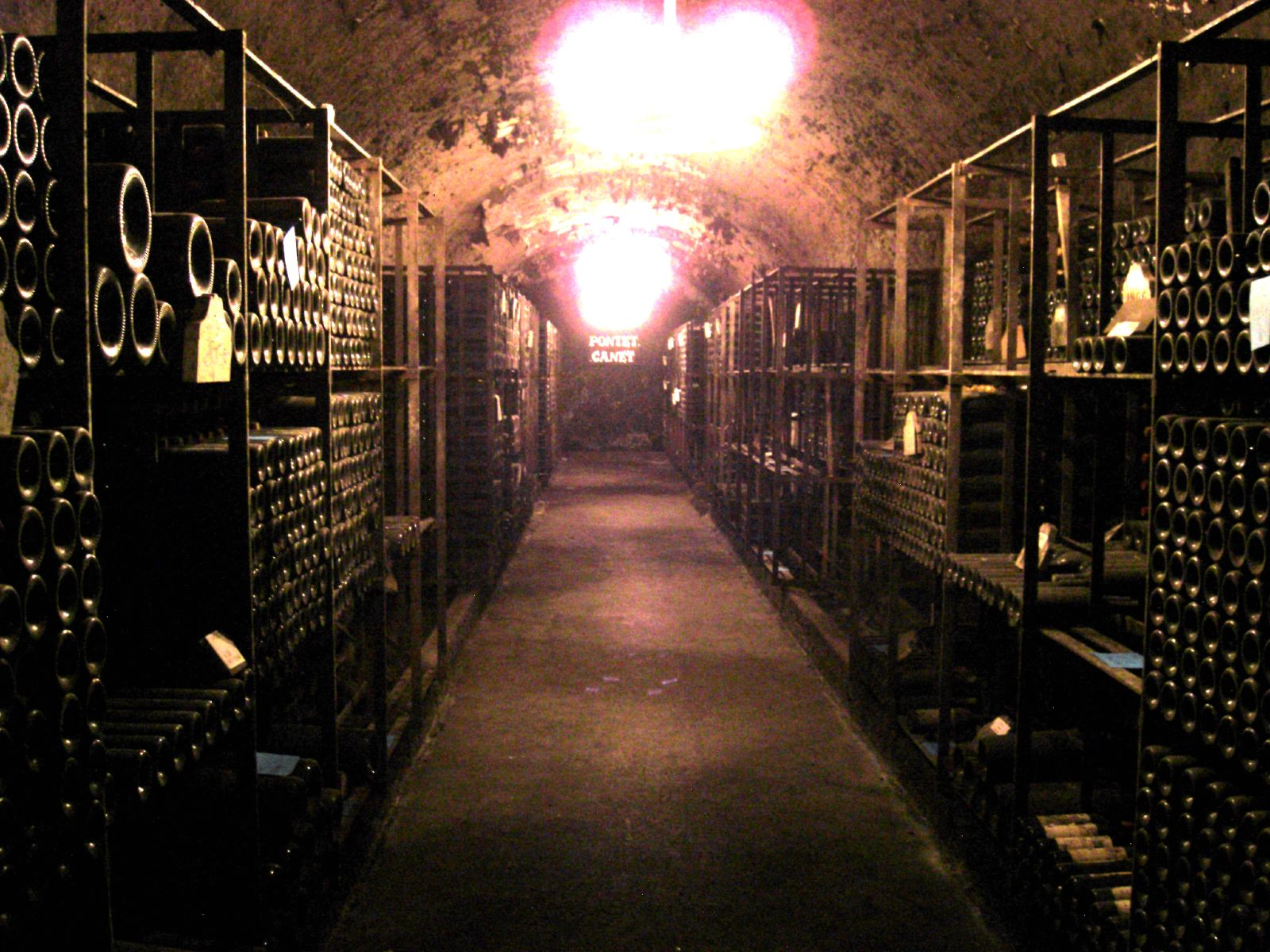
Underground wine cellar of Pontet-Canet

Of the 120 hectares (300 acres) estate of Pontet-Canet located in the northern end of the Pauillac commune, across the road from first growth Château Mouton Rothschild, 80 ha (200 acres) are under vine. The soil composition is mainly gravel over a subsoil of clay and limestone. The grape variety distribution is 60% Cabernet Sauvignon, 33% Merlot, 5% Petit Verdot and 2% Cabernet Franc. Vines average 35 years of age.

Pontet-Canet has one of the largest productions of any classified growth in the Medoc with a production of nearly 20,000 cases of its grand-vin, and another 20,000 cases of its second wine, Les Hauts de Pontet. Harvesting is done by hand, and after sorting the grapes are moved into the estate's gravity-feed cellars for crushing. Fermentation takes place in a mixture of concrete and stainless steel vats. Wines are aged for 16-20 months in up to 60% new oak barrels before fining with egg whites and bottling.
