= Aleksandar Vukic =

Australian tennis player (born 1996)

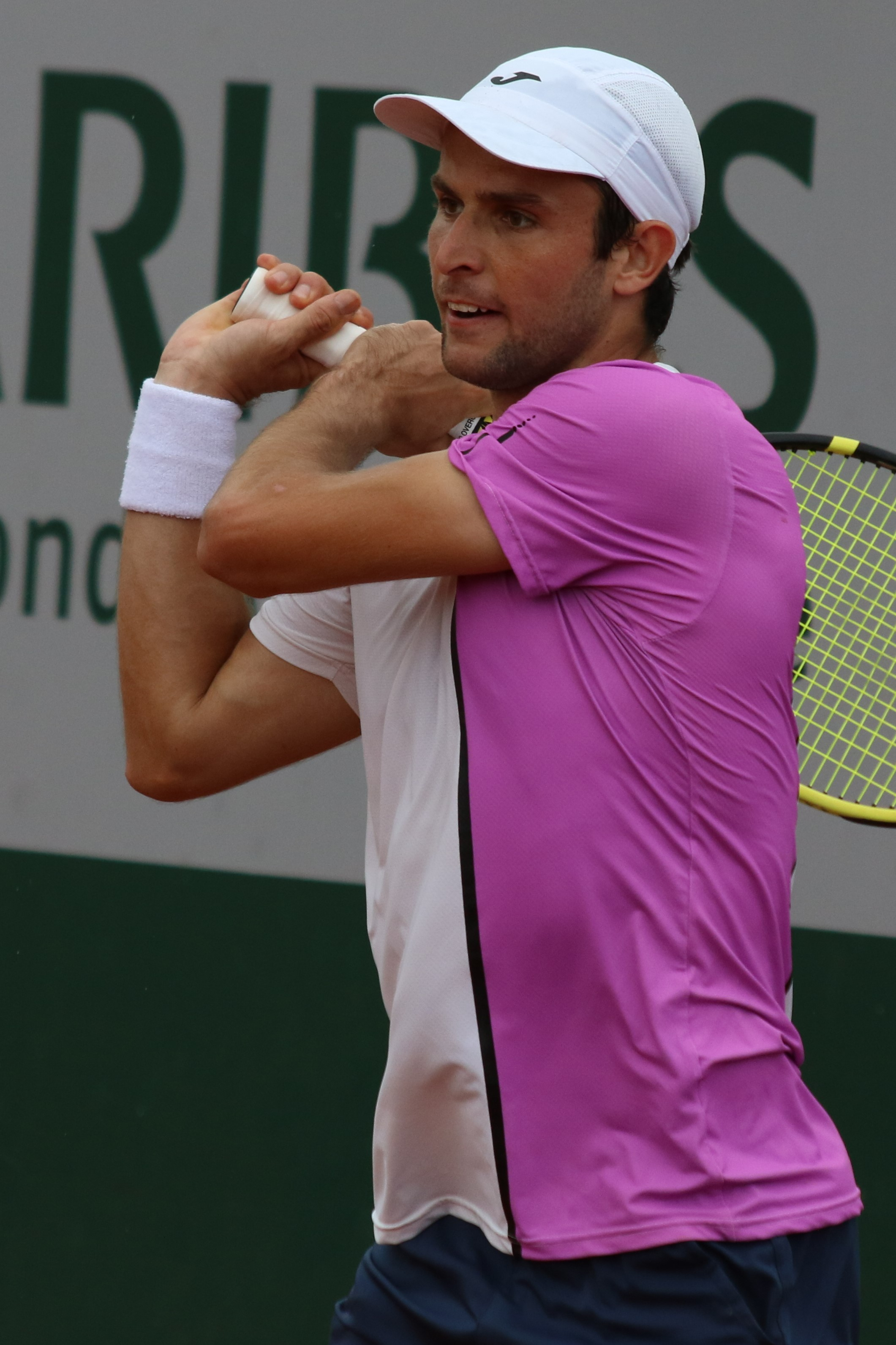
- Vukic at the 2022 French Open
- Country (sports): Australia
- Born: 6 April 1996 (age 30) Sydney, New South Wales, Australia
- Height: 1.88 m (6 ft 2 in)
- Turned pro: 2018
- Plays: Right-handed (two-handed backhand)
- College: Illinois
- Prize money: US $ 3,370,876

Singles
- Career record: 56–82
- Career titles: 0
- Highest ranking: No. 48 (14 August 2023)
- Current ranking: No. 112 (28 September 2026)

Grand Slam singles results
- Australian Open: 3R (2025)
- French Open: 1R (2020, 2024, 2025, 2026)
- Wimbledon: 2R (2023, 2024, 2025)
- US Open: 1R (2023, 2024, 2025, 2026)

Doubles
- Career record: 9–16
- Career titles: 0
- Highest ranking: No. 237 (9 June 2025)
- Current ranking: No. 577 (2 February 2026)

Grand Slam doubles results
- Australian Open: 2R (2024, 2025)
- French Open: 2R (2025)
- Wimbledon: 1R (2024)
- US Open: 1R (2023)

Grand Slam mixed doubles results
- Australian Open: 1R (2021)
- Last updated on: 2 February 2026.

Aleksandar Vukic (Serbian: Александар Вукић, romanized: Aleksandar Vukić, pronounced [aleksǎːndar ʋǔːkitɕ, alěksaːn-]; born 6 April 1996) is an Australian professional tennis player. He has a career high ATP singles ranking of world No. 48 achieved on 14 August 2023. He also has a career high ATP doubles ranking of world No. 237 achieved on 9 June 2025.

Vukic has reached one ATP Tour singles final at the 2023 Atlanta Open. Vukic made his main draw ATP singles debut at the 2018 Sydney International and his Grand Slam debut at the 2020 French Open, after qualifying for both.

== Early life ==
Vukic was born in Sydney, Australia, and is of Serbian and Montenegrin descent. His parents and older brother left Montenegro during the breakup of Yugoslavia in the early 1990s and settled in Sydney before Vukic was born. Vukic began playing tennis at the age of 6 and attended Normanhurst Boys High School throughout his upbringing. He later attended the University of Illinois from 2015 to 2018 where he was named three-time All-American in tennis.

== Professional career ==
=== 2014–2019: ITF and ATP debut ===
Vukic made his ITF Tour debut in Spain in May 2014.

Vukic made his main draw ATP singles debut at the 2018 Sydney International, where he qualified for the main draw by defeating Dušan Lajović and Ričardas Berankis. He came within two points of defeating Feliciano López, ranked No. 36 in the world. He lost the match 6–4, 6–7^{(5–7)}, 3–6.

In May 2019, Vukic reached the semifinal of the 2019 Savannah Challenger, his best performance at the ATP Challenger Tour level. Following a quarter-final appearance at 2019 Internazionali di Tennis Città dell'Aquila, Vukic reached a career high singles ranking of No. 258.

=== 2020: Grand Slam and top 200 debut ===
In January 2020, Vukic reached the final round of 2020 Australian Open – Men's singles qualifying. In March 2020, Vukic reached his first ATP Challenger Tour final in Monterrey Challenger.

In September, Vukic qualified for the 2020 French Open main draw (defeating future world number one Carlos Alcaraz en route), where he made his Grand Slam singles debut. He lost in round one to Pedro Martínez.

Vukic ended 2020 with a singles ranking of world no. 196.

=== 2021: First ATP Tour win, Masters debut and first win ===
Vukic commenced the 2021 season at the 2021 Great Ocean Road Open, where he defeated Yen-Hsun Lu for his first ATP main draw win. Vukic was defeated by Jannik Sinner in the second round.

At the 2021 Australian Open, Vukic entered into the main draw as a wildcard and lost to 19th seed Karen Khachanov in the first round.

Vukic returned to the ATP Challenger tour, achieving quarterfinal appearances in April at Split and Split II.

Vukic lost in the third and final round of qualifying for the French Open and in the first round of qualifying for Wimbledon Championships.

In August 2021, Vukic tested positive for COVID-19 and had to skip the US Open.

On 20 September 2021, and following a semifinal result at the Cary Challenger, Vukic improved his ranking back to No. 214. In October at the 2021 BNP Paribas Open he recorded his first main draw win at a Masters 1000 level as a qualifier defeating Pablo Andújar. He followed this by a final also in singles at the 2021 Charlottesville Men's Pro Challenger where he lost to Stefan Kozlov.

He reached a career-high singles ranking of No. 156 on 22 November 2021.

=== 2022: First ATP quarterfinal, Challenger title and Major win, top 125 ===
At the Adelaide International 2, Vukic achieved his first top 50 win against Alexander Bublik and reached his first ATP quarterfinal, before losing to Thanasi Kokkinakis. As a result, he made his top 150 debut at world no. 144 on 17 January 2022.

Vukic was awarded a second wildcard into the 2022 Australian Open. He defeated 30th seed Lloyd Harris in four sets for his first Grand Slam victory. He lost to qualifier Radu Albot in the second round.

In February, he won his first title at the 2022 Bengaluru Open II. As a result, he reached the top 125 at world no. 118 on 21 February 2022.

At the 2022 Sofia Open he defeated Fabio Fognini and Fernando Verdasco to reach only his second ATP quarterfinal.

=== 2023-2024: First ATP final and Masters third round, top 50 ===
He qualified for the 2023 Australian Open where he lost to fellow qualifier Brandon Holt. At the 2023 Delray Beach Open he entered the main draw as lucky loser and won in the first round against qualifier Christopher Eubanks.

He qualified for his second Masters 1000 main draw in Indian Wells for a second time at this tournament and he then qualified for the 2023 Miami Open to make his debut at this Masters tournament. He won his third professional title and the biggest of his career, a second Challenger at the 2023 Busan Open in South Korea, defeating top seed Max Purcell by retirement. At the next Challenger, the 2023 Open de Oeiras II he reached again the final. As a result, he made his top 100 debut at world No. 95 in the rankings on 22 May 2023. On his debut at the 2023 Wimbledon Championships he defeated Daniel Altmaier.

At the 2023 Atlanta Open, he reached his first ATP semifinal, defeating fourth seed Yoshihito Nishioka and fifth seed Christopher Eubanks. He then defeated seventh seed Ugo Humbert to reach his first final at ATP Tour level. He reached the third round of a Masters 1000 for the first time at the 2023 Canadian Open as a lucky loser, defeating Borna Ćorić and Sebastian Korda. As a result, he reached the top 50 in the rankings on 14 August 2023.

At the beginning of the European clay season at the 2024 Grand Prix Hassan II, he reached the quarterfinals defeating previous year runner-up Alexandre Müller, and then second seed Sebastian Ofner in a match with two tiebreaks lasting close to three hours. He made his debut at the 2024 Monte-Carlo Masters as a lucky loser replacing Jordan Thompson after his late withdrawal. At the beginning of grass court season, he reached the quarterfinals at the 2024 Libéma Open. Next, also as a lucky loser, he entered the main draw of the 2024 Eastbourne International and reached his second ATP semifinal with wins over Fabian Marozsan, third seed Alexander Bublik and Yoshihito Nishioka (who beat him in the qualifications). He won again his first round match at the 2024 Wimbledon Championships over Sebastian Ofner in a five-setter saving a match point.

At the 2024 Rolex Shanghai Masters, where Vukic qualified for the main draw, he defeated number eight seed Casper Ruud for his career-best win and first top 10 victory, to reach the third round at this level for the second time.

== ATP Tour finals ==
=== Singles: 1 (1 runner-up) ===
Legend Grand Slam (0–0) ATP Masters 1000 (0–0) ATP 500 (0–0) ATP 250 (0–1)	Finals by surface Hard (0–1) Clay (0–0) Grass (0–0)	Finals by setting Outdoor (0–1) Indoor (0–0)

Result	W–L	Date	Tournament	Tier	Surface	Opponent	Score
Loss	0–1	Jul 2023	Atlanta Open, United States	ATP 250	Hard	(United States) Taylor Fritz	5–7, 7–6^{(7–5)}, 4–6

== Record against top 10 players ==
Vukic has a 1–9 (10%) record against players who were, at the time the match was played, ranked in the top 10.

No.	Player	Rank	Tournament	Surface	Rd	Score	AVR
2024
1.	(Norway) Casper Ruud	9	Shanghai Masters, China	Hard	R2	6–4, 6–4	91

*As of 29 October 2025

== ATP Challenger and ITF Futures/World Tennis Tour finals ==
=== Singles: 15 (4 titles, 11 runners-up) ===
Legend ATP Challenger Tour (3–7) ITF Futures/WTT (1–4)	Finals by surface Hard (4–9) Clay (0–2) Grass (0–0)

Result	W–L	Date	Tournament	Tier	Surface	Opponent	Score
Loss	0–1	Aug 2015	Canada F6, Saskatoon	Futures	Hard	(Australia) Matt Reid	6–7^{(12–14)}, 1–6
Win	1–1	Jul 2017	USA F25, Champaign, Illinois	Futures	Hard	(United States) Deiton Baughman	7–5, 4–6, 6–2
Loss	1–2	Aug 2017	Poland F9, Bydgoszcz	Futures	Clay	(Germany) Mats Moraing	2–6, 5–7
Loss	1–3	Jul 2018	USA F19, Wichita, Kansas	Futures	Hard	(Russia) Evgeny Karlovskiy	4–6, 4–6
Loss	1–4	Mar 2019	M25 Bakersfield, California	WTT	Hard	(United States) Jenson Brooksby	3–6, 1–6
Loss	1–5	Mar 2020	Monterrey, Mexico	Challenger	Hard	(France) Adrian Mannarino	1–6, 3–6
Loss	1–6	Nov 2021	Charlottesville, USA	Challenger	Hard (i)	(United States) Stefan Kozlov	2–6, 3–6
Loss	1–7	Nov 2021	Champaign, USA	Challenger	Hard (i)	(United States) Stefan Kozlov	7–5, 3–6, 4–6
Win	2–7	Feb 2022	Bangalore, India	Challenger	Hard	(Bulgaria) Dimitar Kuzmanov	6–4, 6–4
Loss	2–8	Nov 2022	Calgary, Canada	Challenger	Hard (i)	(Germany) Dominik Koepfer	2–6, 4–6
Loss	2–9	Nov 2022	Champaign, USA	Challenger	Hard (i)	(United States) Ben Shelton	6–0, 3–6, 2–6
Loss	2–10	Apr 2023	Seoul, South Korea	Challenger	Hard	(China) Bu Yunchaokete	6–7^{(4–7)}, 4–6
Win	3–10	May 2023	Busan, South Korea	Challenger	Hard	(Australia) Max Purcell	6–4, 1–0 ret.
Loss	3–11	May 2023	Oeiras, Portugal	Challenger	Clay	(Argentina) Facundo Díaz Acosta	4–6, 3–6
Win	4–11	Jul 2026	Granby, Canada	Challenger	Hard	(France) Arthur Géa	6–4, 1–6, 6–1

=== Doubles: 3 (3 runners-up) ===
Legend ATP Challenger Tour (0–2) ITF Futures (0–1)	Finals by surface Hard (0–0) Clay (0–2) Grass (0–1)

Result	W–L	Date	Tournament	Tier	Surface	Partner	Opponents	Score
Loss	0–1	Jun 2015	Serbia F2, Valjevo	Futures	Clay	(Switzerland) Antoine Bellier	(Czech Republic) Libor Salaba (Serbia) Danilo Petrović	6–7^{(7–9)}, 4–6
Loss	0–2	Jul 2021	Poznań	Challenger	Clay	(Poland) Karol Drzewiecki	(Czech Republic) Zdeněk Kolář (Czech Republic) Jiří Lehečka	4–6, 6–3, [5–10]
Loss	0–3	Jun 2023	Surbiton	Challenger	Grass	(Australia) Alexei Popyrin	(United Kingdom) Liam Broady (United Kingdom) Johnny O'Mara	4–6, 7–5, [8–10]

== Performance timelines ==
Key
W	F	SF	QF	#R	RR	Q#	P#	DNQ	A	Z#	PO	G	S	B	NMS	NTI	P	NH

(W) winner; (F) finalist; (SF) semifinalist; (QF) quarterfinalist; (#R) rounds 4, 3, 2, 1; (RR) round-robin stage; (Q#) qualification round; (P#) preliminary round; (DNQ) did not qualify; (A) absent; (Z#) Davis/Fed Cup Zonal Group (with number indication) or (PO) play-off; (G) gold, (S) silver or (B) bronze Olympic/Paralympic medal; (NMS) not a Masters tournament; (NTI) not a Tier I tournament; (P) postponed; (NH) not held; (SR) strike rate (events won / competed); (W–L) win–loss record.
To avoid confusion and double counting, these charts are updated at the conclusion of a tournament or when the player's participation has ended.

=== Singles ===
Tournament	2019	2020	2021	2022	2023	2024	2025	2026	SR	W–L
Grand Slam tournaments
Australian Open	Q1	Q3	1R	2R	1R	1R	3R	1R	0 / 6	3–6
French Open	A	1R	Q3	Q2	Q2	1R	1R	1R	0 / 4	0–4
Wimbledon	A	NH	Q1	A	2R	2R	2R	1R	0 / 4	3–4
US Open	A	A	A	Q1	1R	1R	1R		0 / 3	0–3
Win–loss	0–0	0–1	0–1	1–1	1–3	1–4	3–4	0–3	0 / 17	6–17
ATP Masters 1000 tournaments
Indian Wells Masters	A	NH	2R	Q2	1R	2R	1R	Q2	0 / 4	2–4
Miami Open	A	NH	A	Q1	1R	1R	1R	2R	0 / 4	1–4
Monte-Carlo Masters	A	NH	A	A	A	1R	Q1	Q1	0 / 1	0–1
Madrid Open	A	NH	A	A	A	1R	1R	Q1	0 / 2	0–2
Italian Open	A	A	A	A	A	2R	2R	2R	0 / 3	3–3
Canadian Open	A	NH	A	A	3R	Q1	3R		0 / 2	2–2
Cincinnati Open	A	A	A	A	A	Q2	1R		0 / 1	0–1
Shanghai Masters	A	NH			2R	3R	2R		0 / 3	3–3
Paris Masters	A	A	A	A	A	A	2R		0 / 1	1–1
Win–loss	0–0	0-0	1–1	0-0	3-4	4–6	4–8	2–2	0 / 21	14–21
Year-end ranking	273	196	156	132	62	69	82		$2,632,494	

== National representation ==
All Davis Cup matches: 1–0 (Singles: 1–0, Doubles: 0–0)
Round	Date	Opponents	Tie score	Venue	Surface	Match	Opponent(s)	Rubber score
2025 Davis Cup Qualifiers first round
1R	31 Jan – 1 Feb 2025	Sweden	3–1	Stockholm	Hard (i)	Singles 2	Leo Borg	6–4, 6–4
2025 Davis Cup Qualifiers second round
2R	13 – 14 Sep 2025	Belgium	3–2	Sydney	Hard	Singles 4	Raphael Collignon	7–6, 3–6, 4–6
