= Nicolas Arseneault =

Canadian tennis player (born 2007)

- Country (sports): Canada
- Born: 18 January 2007 (age 19) Richmond Hill, Ontario, Canada
- Height: 1.83 m (6 ft 0 in)
- Plays: Left-handed (two-handed backhand)
- College: Kentucky
- Coach: Serge Arseneault
- Prize money: US $93,056

Singles
- Career record: 1–1 (at ATP Tour level, Grand Slam level, and in Davis Cup)
- Career titles: 0
- Highest ranking: No. 491 (8 August 2025)
- Current ranking: No. 1,139 (9 November 2026)

Grand Slam singles results
- US Open Junior: 1R (2025)

Doubles
- Career record: 0–1 (at ATP Tour level, Grand Slam level, and in Davis Cup)
- Career titles: 0
- Highest ranking: No. 593 (14 September 2026)
- Current ranking: No. 678 (9 November 2026)

Grand Slam doubles results
- US Open Junior: 2R (2025)
- Last updated on: 9 November 2026.

Nicolas Arseneault (born 18 January 2007) is a Canadian tennis player. He has a career-high ATP singles ranking of world No. 491 achieved on 8 August 2025 and a doubles ranking of No. 593 achieved on 14 September 2026.

Arseneault has agreed to play college tennis at University of Kentucky at 2025 season.

== Professional career ==
Arseneault made his ATP Tour main draw debut after receiving a wildcard for the 2025 National Bank Open. He defeated qualifier Valentin Royer in the first round win. He lost to defending champion Alexei Popyrin in the second round.

== Personal life ==
Arseneault has two siblings who also play tennis: His older sister Ariana and a twin brother, Mikael.

== Performance timeline ==
Tournament	2024	2025	SR	W–L	Win%
Grand Slam tournaments
Australian Open	A	A	0 / 0	0–0	–
French Open	A	A	0 / 0	0–0	–
Wimbledon	A	A	0 / 0	0–0	–
US Open	A	A	0 / 0	0–0	–
Win–loss	0–0	0–0	0 / 0	0–0	–
ATP Masters 1000
Indian Wells Open	A	A	0 / 0	0–0	–
Miami Open	A	A	0 / 0	0–0	–
Monte-Carlo Masters	A	A	0 / 0	0–0	–
Madrid Open	A	A	0 / 0	0–0	–
Italian Open	A	A	0 / 0	0–0	–
Canadian Open	Q1	2R	0 / 1	1–1	50%
Cincinnati Open	A	A	0 / 0	0–0	–
Shanghai Masters	A	A	0 / 0	0–0	–
Paris Masters	A	A	0 / 0	0–0	–
Win–loss	0–0	1–1	0 / 1	1–1	50%

== ITF World Tennis Tour finals ==
=== Singles: 1 (runner-up) ===
Legend ITF WTT (0–1)

Result	W–L	Date	Tournament	Tier	Surface	Opponent	Score
Loss	0–1	Jun 2025	M25 Santo Domingo, Dominican Republic	WTT	Hard	(Dominican Republic) Roberto Cid Subervi	2–6, 2–6

=== Doubles: 2 (1 title, 1 runner-up) ===
Legend ITF WTT (1–1)

Result	W–L	Date	Tournament	Tier	Surface	Partner	Opponents	Score
Loss	0–1	Mar 2025	M25 Santo Domingo, Dominican Republic	WTT	Hard	(Canada) Mikael Arseneault	(Brazil) Mateo Barreiros Reyes (Costa Rica) Jesse Flores	6–4, 3–6, [5–10]
Win	1–1	May 2025	M15 Orlando, US	WTT	Clay	(Canada) Dan Martin	(United States) Ryan Dickerson (United States) Andrew Fenty	6–3, 7–6^{(7–3)}
