= 2013 OEC Kaohsiung – Singles =

Singles
- 2013 OEC Kaohsiung

Final
- Champion: (Chinese Taipei) Lu Yen-hsun
- Runner-up: (India) Yuki Bhambri
- Score: 6–4, 6–3

Events
Singles	Doubles
← 2012 ·	OEC Kaohsiung	· 2014 →

Go Soeda was the defending champion but chose not to compete.
Top seed Lu Yen-hsun won the title over Yuki Bhambri 6–4, 6–3.

== Seeds ==
1. (Chinese Taipei) Lu Yen-hsun (champion)
2. (United States) Jack Sock (semifinals)
3. (United States) Michael Russell (first round, retired)
4. (Colombia) Alejandro González (quarterfinals)
5. (United States) Rajeev Ram (first round)
6. (Australia) Matthew Ebden (semifinals)
7. (Japan) Yūichi Sugita (second round)
8. (Chinese Taipei) Jimmy Wang (quarterfinals, retired)

== Draw ==
=== Key ===
- Q = Qualifier
- WC = Wild card
- LL = Lucky loser
- Alt = Alternate
- SE = Special exempt
- PR = Protected ranking
- ITF = ITF entry
- JE = Junior exempt
- w/o = Walkover
- r = Retired
- d = Defaulted
- SR = Special ranking

=== Finals ===
Semifinals
1	(Chinese Taipei) Lu Yen-hsun	6	6
6	(Australia) Matthew Ebden	4	4
Q	(India) Yuki Bhambri	6^{10}	7	6
2	(United States) Jack Sock	7^{12}	5	3

Final
1	(Chinese Taipei) Lu Yen-hsun	6	6
Q	(India) Yuki Bhambri	4	3

=== Top half ===
First round
1	(Chinese Taipei) Y-h Lu	6	6
(Thailand) D Udomchoke	4	1
(Chinese Taipei) L-C Huang	6	4
(South Korea) J-W Na	0	2^{r}
(Japan) H Moriya	6	6
(Chinese Taipei) T Chen	3	3
Q	(Japan) T Matsui	1	4
8	(Chinese Taipei) J Wang	6	6
3	(United States) M Russell	7^{7}	1^{r}
(South Korea) Y-K Lim	6^{3}	4
WC	(Chinese Taipei) C-f Wang	5	4
WC	(Chinese Taipei) T-h Yang	7	6
WC	(Chinese Taipei) H-y Peng	3	6^{3}
(South Korea) S-Y Jeong	6	7^{7}
(New Zealand) M Venus	3	4
6	(Australia) M Ebden	6	6

Second round
1	(Chinese Taipei) Y-h Lu	6	6
(Chinese Taipei) L-C Huang	1	2
(Japan) H Moriya	3	6	2
8	(Chinese Taipei) J Wang	6	3	6
(South Korea) Y-K Lim	3	7^{9}	6
WC	(Chinese Taipei) T-h Yang	6	6^{7}	4
(South Korea) S-Y Jeong	3	2
6	(Australia) M Ebden	6	6

Quarterfinals
1	(Chinese Taipei) Y-h Lu	6	0
8	(Chinese Taipei) J Wang	4	0^{r}
(South Korea) Y-K Lim	1	2
6	(Australia) M Ebden	6	6

Semifinals
1	(Chinese Taipei) Y-h Lu	6	6
6	(Australia) M Ebden	4	4

=== Bottom half ===
First round
7	(Japan) Y Sugita	6	6
Q	(Japan) Y Uchiyama	2	4
Q	(India) Y Bhambri	7^{10}	6
(Israel) A Weintraub	6^{8}	1
(Japan) Shuichi Sekiguchi	7^{8}	6
WC	(Chinese Taipei) H-h Lee	6^{6}	4
Q	(South Korea) H Chung	6^{4}	4
4	(Colombia) A González	7^{7}	6
5	(United States) R Ram	3	4
(Australia) G Jones	6	6
(Japan) H Kondo	4	5
(Australia) J-P Smith	6	7
(Colombia) N Barrientos	6	6
(South Korea) J S Nam	4	3
(New Zealand) J Statham	4	2
2	(United States) J Sock	6	6

Second round
7	(Japan) Y Sugita	6^{5}	5
Q	(India) Y Bhambri	7^{7}	7
(Japan) S Sekiguchi	6^{5}	4
4	(Colombia) A González	7^{7}	6
(Australia) G Jones	4	4
(Australia) J-P Smith	6	6
(Colombia) N Barrientos	4	2
2	(United States) J Sock	6	6

Quarterfinals
Q	(India) Y Bhambri	6	2	6
4	(Colombia) A González	3	6	2
(Australia) J-P Smith	6^{7}	3
2	(United States) J Sock	7^{9}	6

Semifinals
Q	(India) Y Bhambri	6^{10}	7	6
2	(United States) J Sock	7^{12}	5	3
