= 2013 OEC Kaohsiung – Doubles =

Doubles
- 2013 OEC Kaohsiung

Final
- Champions: (Colombia) Juan Sebastián Cabal (Colombia) Robert Farah
- Runners-up: (India) Yuki Bhambri (Chinese Taipei) Wang Chieh-fu
- Score: 6–4, 6–2

Events
Singles	Doubles
← 2012 ·	OEC Kaohsiung	· 2014 →

John Paul Fruttero and Raven Klaasen were the defending champion but chose not to compete.
Top Seeds Juan Sebastián Cabal and Robert Farah claimed the title defeating Yuki Bhambri and Wang Chieh-fu 6–4, 6–2

== Seeds ==
1. (Colombia) Juan Sebastián Cabal / (Colombia) Robert Farah (champions)
2. (Thailand) Sanchai Ratiwatana / (Thailand) Sonchat Ratiwatana (first round)
3. (Philippines) Ruben Gonzales / (Philippines) Treat Conrad Huey (semifinals)
4. (Chinese Taipei) Lee Hsin-han / (Chinese Taipei) Peng Hsien-yin (quarterfinals)

== Draw ==
=== Key ===
- Q = Qualifier
- WC = Wild card
- LL = Lucky loser
- Alt = Alternate
- SE = Special exempt
- PR = Protected ranking
- ITF = ITF entry
- JE = Junior exempt
- w/o = Walkover
- r = Retired
- d = Defaulted
- SR = Special ranking

=== Draw ===
First round
1	(Colombia) JS Cabal (Colombia) R Farah	7	1	[10]
(New Zealand) J Statham (New Zealand) M Venus	5	6	[3]
(South Korea) H Chung (South Korea) J-s Nam	1	4
(United States) R Ram (United States) M Russell	6	6
3	(Philippines) R Gonzales (Philippines) TC Huey	7	6
(Colombia) N Barrientos (Colombia) A González	5	4
(Chinese Taipei) T Chen (South Korea) Y-K Lim	6	6
WC	(Chinese Taipei) Chen I-Ta (Chinese Taipei) Yang Shao-Chi	3	3
(Australia) M Ebden (Thailand) D Udomchoke	3	7^{8}	[10]
(Japan) H Kondo (Japan) T Matsui	6	6^{6}	[6]
(Chinese Taipei) L-c Huang (South Korea) S-y Jeong	4	6	[6]
4	(Chinese Taipei) H-h Lee (Chinese Taipei) H-y Peng	6	3	[10]
WC	(Chinese Taipei) C-p Hsieh (Chinese Taipei) T-h Wang	2	6	[6]
(Japan) Arata Onozawa (Japan) Y Sugita	6	3	[10]
WC	(India) Y Bhamnbri (Chinese Taipei) C-f Wang	7^{7}	7^{7}
2	(Thailand) Sa Ratiwatana (Thailand) So Ratiwatana	6^{5}	6^{1}

Quarterfinals
1	(Colombia) JS Cabal (Colombia) R Farah	6	6
(United States) R Ram (United States) M Russell	2	3
3	(Philippines) R Gonzales (Philippines) TC Huey	4	6	[13]
(Chinese Taipei) T Chen (South Korea) Y-K Lim	6	1	[11]
(Australia) M Ebden (Thailand) D Udomchoke	7^{7}	6
4	(Chinese Taipei) H-h Lee (Chinese Taipei) H-y Peng	6^{5}	2
(Japan) A Onozawa (Japan) Y Sugita	3	4
WC	(India) Y Bhamnbri (Chinese Taipei) C-f Wang	6	6

Semifinals
1	(Colombia) JS Cabal (Colombia) R Farah	6	3	[12]
3	(Philippines) R Gonzales (Philippines) TC Huey	4	6	[10]
(Australia) M Ebden (Thailand) D Udomchoke	3	4
WC	(India) Y Bhamnbri (Chinese Taipei) C-f Wang	6	6

Final
1	(Colombia) JS Cabal (Colombia) R Farah	6	6
WC	(India) Y Bhamnbri (Chinese Taipei) C-f Wang	4	2
