= 2014 OEC Kaohsiung – Singles =

Singles
- 2014 OEC Kaohsiung

Final
- Champion: (Chinese Taipei) Lu Yen-hsun
- Runner-up: (Italy) Luca Vanni
- Score: 6–7^{(7–9)}, 6–4, 6–4

Events
Singles	Doubles
← 2013 ·	OEC Kaohsiung	· 2015 →

Lu Yen-hsun was the defending champion, and defended his title defeating Luca Vanni 6–7^{(7–9)}, 6–4, 6–4 in the final.

== Seeds ==
1. (Chinese Taipei) Lu Yen-hsun (champion)
2. (Slovenia) Blaž Kavčič (withdrew due to exhaustion)
3. (Japan) Go Soeda (quarterfinals)
4. (Japan) Yūichi Sugita (semifinals)
5. (Russia) Alexander Kudryavtsev (semifinals, retired)
6. (Switzerland) Marco Chiudinelli (quarterfinals)
7. (Italy) Thomas Fabbiano (quarterfinals)
8. (Ukraine) Denys Molchanov (quarterfinals)

== Draw ==
=== Key ===
- Q = Qualifier
- WC = Wild card
- LL = Lucky loser
- Alt = Alternate
- SE = Special exempt
- PR = Protected ranking
- ITF = ITF entry
- JE = Junior exempt
- w/o = Walkover
- r = Retired
- d = Defaulted
- SR = Special ranking

=== Finals ===
Semifinals
1/WC	(Chinese Taipei) Lu Yen-hsun	6
5	(Russia) Alexander Kudryavtsev	5^{r}
4	(Japan) Yūichi Sugita	3	4
(Italy) Luca Vanni	6	6

Final
1/WC	(Chinese Taipei) Lu Yen-hsun	6^{7}	6	6
(Italy) Luca Vanni	7^{9}	4	4

=== Top half ===
First round
1/WC	(Chinese Taipei) Y-h Lu	6	6
(Russia) D Matsukevich	3	0
(Chinese Taipei) T-h Yang	4	6	7
(United Kingdom) O Golding	6	3	5
(Japan) H Kondo	3	6	6
WC	(Chinese Taipei) Ho Chih-Jen	6	1	2
(Japan) Y Ito	6^{5}	4
6	(Switzerland) M Chiudinelli	7^{7}	6
3	(Japan) G Soeda	6	6
(Republic of Ireland) S Barry	1	3
WC	(Chinese Taipei) J-c Hung	4	4
(Japan) Y Uchiyama	6	6
(Japan) T Niki	2	7^{9}	6
(Slovakia) I Klec	6	6^{7}	4
(Japan) Y Nishioka	0	4
5	(Russia) A Kudryavtsev	6	6

Second round
1/WC	(Chinese Taipei) Y-h Lu	7	6
(Chinese Taipei) T-h Yang	5	2
(Japan) H Kondo	3	6^{3}
6	(Switzerland) M Chiudinelli	6	7^{7}
3	(Japan) G Soeda	6	6
(Japan) Y Uchiyama	3	4
(Japan) T Niki	6	6^{6}	2
5	(Russia) A Kudryavtsev	4	7^{8}	6

Quarterfinals
1/WC	(Chinese Taipei) Y-h Lu	6^{4}	6	6
6	(Switzerland) M Chiudinelli	7^{7}	4	2
3	(Japan) G Soeda	3	6^{1}
5	(Russia) A Kudryavtsev	6	7^{7}

Semifinals
1/WC	(Chinese Taipei) Y-h Lu	6
5	(Russia) A Kudryavtsev	5^{r}

=== Bottom half ===
First round
8	(Ukraine) D Molchanov	6	6^{6}	7^{7}
(India) J Nedunchezhiyan	4	7^{8}	6^{3}
(Spain) Ivan Arenas-Gualda	1	0
Q	(Japan) K Takeuchi	6	6
Q	(Japan) Shuichi Sekiguchi	0	1
(Chinese Taipei) L-c Huang	6	6
Q	(South Korea) J-s Nam	4	2
4	(Japan) Y Sugita	6	6
7	(Italy) T Fabbiano	6	6
(Japan) T Matsui	4	2
(South Korea) H Chung	6	6
WC	(Chinese Taipei) C-f Wang	3	4
(Italy) L Vanni	6	7^{7}
Q	(Spain) Jaime Pulgar Garcia	3	6^{4}
(Chinese Taipei) T Chen	6	6
LL	(Australia) R Agar	2	0

Second round
8	(Ukraine) D Molchanov	6	6
Q	(Japan) K Takeuchi	4	3
(Chinese Taipei) L-c Huang	7^{7}	6^{4}	1
4	(Japan) Y Sugita	6^{5}	7^{7}	6
7	(Italy) T Fabbiano	2	7^{8}	5
(South Korea) H Chung	6	6^{6}	1^{r}
(Italy) L Vanni	7	6
(Chinese Taipei) T Chen	5	0

Quarterfinals
8	(Ukraine) D Molchanov	6^{3}	7^{7}	2
4	(Japan) Y Sugita	7^{7}	6^{3}	6
7	(Italy) T Fabbiano	2	1
(Italy) L Vanni	6	6

Semifinals
4	(Japan) Y Sugita	3	4
(Italy) L Vanni	6	6
