= 2013 OEC Kaohsiung =

- Date: 16–22 September
- Edition: 2nd
- Surface: Hard
- Location: Kaohsiung, Taiwan

Champions

Singles
- (Chinese Taipei) Lu Yen-hsun

Doubles
- (Colombia) Juan Sebastián Cabal / (Colombia) Robert Farah
| ← 2012 · | OEC Kaohsiung | · 2014 → |

The 2013 OEC Kaohsiung was a professional tennis tournament played on hard courts. It was the second edition of the tournament which was part of the 2013 ATP Challenger Tour. It took place in Kaohsiung, Taiwan between 16 and 22 September 2013.

== Singles main-draw entrants ==
=== Seeds ===
| Country | Player | Rank^{1} | Seed |
|---|---|---|---|
| TPE | Lu Yen-hsun | 64 | 1 |
| USA | Jack Sock | 88 | 2 |
| USA | Michael Russell | 91 | 3 |
| COL | Alejandro González | 112 | 4 |
| USA | Rajeev Ram | 119 | 5 |
| AUS | Matthew Ebden | 134 | 6 |
| JPN | Yūichi Sugita | 144 | 7 |
| TPE | Jimmy Wang | 153 | 8 |

- ^{1} Rankings are as of September 9, 2013.

=== Other entrants ===
The following players received wildcards into the singles main draw:

- (Chinese Taipei) Lee Hsin-han
- (Chinese Taipei) Peng Hsien-yin
- (Chinese Taipei) Wang Chieh-fu
- (Chinese Taipei) Yang Tsung-hua

The following players received entry from the qualifying draw:

- (Japan) Toshihide Matsui
- (Japan) Yasutaka Uchiyama
- (India) Yuki Bhambri
- (South Korea) Chung Hyeon

== Champions ==
=== Singles ===
- (Chinese Taipei) Lu Yen-hsun def. (India) Yuki Bhambri, 6–4, 6–3

=== Doubles ===
- (Colombia) Juan Sebastián Cabal / (Colombia) Robert Farah def. (India) Yuki Bhambri / (Chinese Taipei) Wang Chieh-fu, 6–4, 6–2
