= 2015 OEC Kaohsiung – Singles =

Singles
- 2015 OEC Kaohsiung

Final
- Champion: (South Korea) Chung Hyeon
- Runner-up: (India) Yuki Bhambri
- Score: 7–5, 6–4

Events
| Singles | Doubles |
| ← 2014 · | OEC Kaohsiung | · 2016 → |

Lu Yen-hsun was the defending champion, but chose not to participate.

== Seeds ==
1. (Czech Republic) Jiří Veselý (semifinals)
2. (South Korea) Chung Hyeon (champion)
3. (Czech Republic) Lukáš Rosol (first round)
4. (India) Yuki Bhambri (final)
5. (Japan) Tatsuma Ito (semifinals)
6. (Australia) Matthew Ebden (first round)
7. (Italy) Luca Vanni (second round)
8. (Estonia) Jürgen Zopp (quarterfinals)

== Draw ==
=== Key ===
- Q = Qualifier
- WC = Wild card
- LL = Lucky loser
- Alt = Alternate
- ITF = ITF entry
- PR = Protected ranking
- SR = Special ranking
- SE = Special exempt
- JE = Junior exempt
- JR = Junior Accelerator Programme entrant
- CO = College Accelerator Programme entrant
- NG = Next Gen Accelerator Program entrant
- w/o = Walkover
- r = Retired
- d = Defaulted

=== Finals ===
Semifinals
1/WC | (Czech Republic) Jiří Veselý | 6^{2} | 0
4/WC | (India) Yuki Bhambri | 7^{7} | 6
5 | (Japan) Tatsuma Ito | 0 | 0^{r}
2 | (South Korea) Chung Hyeon | 6 | 2

Final
4/WC | (India) Yuki Bhambri | 5 | 4
2 | (South Korea) Chung Hyeon | 7 | 6

=== Top half ===
First round
1/WC | (Czech Republic) J Veselý | 6 | 6
WC | (Chinese Taipei) C-f Wang | 2 | 0
(Colombia) N Barrientos | 6 | 6
Q | (Chinese Taipei) K-y Lee | 4 | 4
(United States) D Nguyen | 3 | 1
(Japan) H Moriya | 6 | 6
(United States) A Sarkissian | 1 | 4
7 | (Italy) L Vanni | 6 | 6
4/WC | (India) Y Bhambri | 7^{7} | 6
(India) S Devvarman | 6^{5} | 0
Q | (Australia) H Bourchier | 4 | 6 | 3
(Germany) P Gojowczyk | 6 | 3 | 6
(Argentina) M Trungelliti | 6 | 6
Q | (Japan) T Suzuki | 4 | 2
(Chinese Taipei) J Wang | 6 | 6^{3} | 6
6 | (Australia) M Ebden | 2 | 7^{7} | 0

Second round
1/WC | (Czech Republic) J Veselý | 4 | 6 | 6
(Colombia) N Barrientos | 6 | 3 | 2
(Japan) H Moriya | 7 | 3 | 6
7 | (Italy) L Vanni | 5 | 6 | 4
4/WC | (India) Y Bhambri | 6 | 6
(Germany) P Gojowczyk | 4 | 3
(Argentina) M Trungelliti | 5 | 2
(Chinese Taipei) J Wang | 7 | 6

Quarterfinals
1/WC | (Czech Republic) J Veselý | 6 | 6
(Japan) H Moriya | 1 | 4
4/WC | (India) Y Bhambri | 6 | 6
(Chinese Taipei) J Wang | 4 | 2

Semifinals
1/WC | (Czech Republic) J Veselý | 6^{2} | 0
4/WC | (India) Y Bhambri | 7^{7} | 6

=== Bottom half ===
First round
5 | (Japan) T Ito | 4 | 7^{11} | 6
(South Korea) D-h Lee | 6 | 6^{9} | 3
PR | (Israel) A Weintraub | 4 | 1
(Italy) T Fabbiano | 6 | 6
Q | (Chinese Taipei) C-h Yi | 6^{7} | 5
(Chinese Taipei) T-h Yang | 7^{9} | 7
(Chinese Taipei) T Chen | 6^{7} | 6 | 6
3 | (Czech Republic) L Rosol | 7^{9} | 4 | 4
8 | (Estonia) J Zopp | 6 | 6
(France) J Eysseric | 3 | 4
(Australia) L Saville | 6 | 7^{7}
(Belgium) N Desein | 4 | 6^{2}
WC | (Chinese Taipei) J-c Hung | 2 | 2
(Japan) T Niki | 6 | 6
(Chinese Taipei) L-c Huang | 0 | 1
2 | (South Korea) H Chung | 6 | 6

Second round
5 | (Japan) T Ito | 6 | 0 | 6
(Italy) T Fabbiano | 4 | 6 | 4
(Chinese Taipei) T-h Yang | 7^{7} | 4 | 7
(Chinese Taipei) T Chen | 6^{5} | 6 | 5
8 | (Estonia) J Zopp | 6 | 6
(Australia) L Saville | 4 | 2
(Japan) T Niki | 2 | 4
2 | (South Korea) H Chung | 6 | 6

Quarterfinals
5 | (Japan) T Ito | 6 | 6
(Chinese Taipei) T-h Yang | 2 | 3
8 | (Estonia) J Zopp | 2 | 4
2 | (South Korea) H Chung | 6 | 6

Semifinals
5 | (Japan) T Ito | 0 | 0^{r}
2 | (South Korea) H Chung | 6 | 2
