= 2014 OEC Kaohsiung – Doubles =

Doubles
- 2014 OEC Kaohsiung

Final
- Champions: (China) Gong Maoxin (Chinese Taipei) Peng Hsien-yin
- Runners-up: (Chinese Taipei) Chen Ti (Chinese Taipei) Huang Liang-chi
- Score: 6–3, 6–2

Events
Singles	Doubles
← 2013 ·	OEC Kaohsiung	· 2015 →

Juan Sebastián Cabal and Robert Farah were the defending champion but chose not to compete.
Gong Maoxin and Peng Hsien-yin won the title, beating Chen Ti and Huang Liang-chi 6–3, 6–2

== Seeds ==
1. (China) Gong Maoxin / (Chinese Taipei) Peng Hsien-yin (champions)
2. (Chinese Taipei) Chen Ti / (Chinese Taipei) Huang Liang-chi (final)
3. (Ukraine) Denys Molchanov / (Chinese Taipei) Yang Tsung-hua (first round)
4. (Australia) Ryan Agar / (India) Jeevan Nedunchezhiyan (first round)

== Draw ==
=== Key ===
- Q = Qualifier
- WC = Wild card
- LL = Lucky loser
- Alt = Alternate
- SE = Special exempt
- PR = Protected ranking
- ITF = ITF entry
- JE = Junior exempt
- w/o = Walkover
- r = Retired
- d = Defaulted
- SR = Special ranking

=== Draw ===
First round
1	(China) M Gong (Chinese Taipei) H-y Peng	6	6
(Chinese Taipei) H-h Lee (Chinese Taipei) C-f Wang	1	4
WC	(Chinese Taipei) T-l Wu (Chinese Taipei) C-h Yi	6	6
(Japan) H Kondo (Japan) Y Nishioka	1	0
4	(Australia) R Agar (India) J Nedunchezhiyan	3	2
(Japan) T Matsui (Japan) Y Sugita	6	6
WC	(Chinese Taipei) Chen I-Ta (Chinese Taipei) Ho Chih-Jen	2	4
(South Korea) H Chung (South Korea) J-s Nam	6	6
(Japan) G Soeda (Japan) Y Uchiyama	6	6
(Spain) Ivan Arenas-Gualda (Spain) Jaime Pulgar-Garcia	3	3
(Italy) T Fabbiano (Italy) L Vanni	6	6
3	(Ukraine) D Molchanov (Chinese Taipei) T-h Yang	4	4
(Switzerland) M Chiudinelli (Slovakia) I Klec	6	6
(Russia) A Kudryavtsev (Russia) D Matsukevich	3	3
WC	(Chinese Taipei) C-p Hsieh (Chinese Taipei) Yang Shao-Chi	6	6^{2}	[8]
2	(Chinese Taipei) T Chen (Chinese Taipei) L-c Huang	3	7^{7}	[10]

Quarterfinals
1	(China) M Gong (Chinese Taipei) H-y Peng	6	6
WC	(Chinese Taipei) T-l Wu (Chinese Taipei) C-h Yi	3	4
(Japan) T Matsui (Japan) Y Sugita
(South Korea) H Chung (South Korea) J-s Nam	w.o
(Japan) G Soeda (Japan) Y Uchiyama	3	6^{5}
(Italy) T Fabbiano (Italy) L Vanni	6	7^{7}
(Switzerland) M Chiudinelli (Slovakia) I Klec	w.0
2	(Chinese Taipei) T Chen (Chinese Taipei) L-c Huang

Semifinals
1	(China) M Gong (Chinese Taipei) H-y Peng	7^{7}	7^{7}
(Japan) T Matsui (Japan) Y Sugita	6^{5}	6^{2}
(Italy) T Fabbiano (Italy) L Vanni	3	6	[6]
2	(Chinese Taipei) T Chen (Chinese Taipei) L-c Huang	6	3	[10]

Final
1	(China) M Gong (Chinese Taipei) H-y Peng	6	6
2	(Chinese Taipei) T Chen (Chinese Taipei) L-c Huang	3	2
