= 2017 OEC Kaohsiung – Singles =

Singles
- 2017 OEC Kaohsiung

Final
- Champion: (Russia) Evgeny Donskoy
- Runner-up: (Romania) Marius Copil
- Score: 7–6^{(7–0)}, 7–5

Events
Singles	Doubles
← 2016 ·	OEC Kaohsiung	· 2018 →

Chung Hyeon was the defending champion but chose not to defend his title.

Evgeny Donskoy won the title after defeating Marius Copil 7–6^{(7–0)}, 7–5 in the final.

== Seeds ==
1. (Australia) Jordan Thompson (first round)
2. (Israel) Dudi Sela (first round)
3. (Romania) Marius Copil (final)
4. (Russia) Evgeny Donskoy (champion)
5. (Slovakia) Lukáš Lacko (quarterfinals)
6. (Russia) Mikhail Youzhny (first round)
7. (India) Yuki Bhambri (first round)
8. (Australia) Akira Santillan (second round)

== Draw ==
=== Key ===
- Q = Qualifier
- WC = Wild card
- LL = Lucky loser
- Alt = Alternate
- SE = Special exempt
- PR = Protected ranking
- ITF = ITF entry
- JE = Junior exempt
- w/o = Walkover
- r = Retired
- d = Defaulted
- SR = Special ranking

=== Finals ===
Semifinals
LL	(Australia) Marinko Matosevic	2	6^{5}
3	(Romania) Marius Copil	6	7^{7}
4	(Russia) Evgeny Donskoy	6	6
(South Africa) Lloyd Harris	3	3

Final
3	(Romania) Marius Copil	6^{0}	5
4	(Russia) Evgeny Donskoy	7^{7}	7

=== Top half ===
First round
1	(Australia) J Thompson	6^{3}	3
Q	(Germany) A Begemann	7^{7}	6
WC	(Chinese Taipei) T-h Yang	6	6
WC	(South Korea) Y-s Chung	3	2
WC	(Chinese Taipei) Y-h Hsu	1	2
LL	(Australia) M Matosevic	6	6
(Australia) L Saville	1	7^{7}	6
6	(Russia) M Youzhny	6	6^{2}	1
3	(Romania) M Copil	6	6
(India) S Nagal	4	2
(Russia) T Gabashvili	0	6^{5}
(Germany) M Bachinger	6	7^{7}
(Switzerland) M Chiudinelli	0	6^{3}
(Czech Republic) L Rosol	6	7^{7}
(Japan) Shuichi Sekiguchi	3	4
8	(Australia) A Santillan	6	6

Second round
Q	(Germany) A Begemann	3	6	6
WC	(Chinese Taipei) T-h Yang	6	1	4
LL	(Australia) M Matosevic	6^{8}	7^{7}	6
(Australia) L Saville	7^{10}	6^{2}	1
3	(Romania) M Copil	6	3	6
(Germany) M Bachinger	4	6	3
(Czech Republic) L Rosol	6	6^{5}	7
8	(Australia) A Santillan	4	7^{7}	5

Quarterfinals
Q	(Germany) A Begemann	1	3
LL	(Australia) M Matosevic	6	6
3	(Romania) M Copil	7^{8}	6
(Czech Republic) L Rosol	6^{6}	4

Semifinals
LL	(Australia) M Matosevic	2	6^{5}
3	(Romania) M Copil	6	7^{7}

=== Bottom half ===
First round
5	(Slovakia) L Lacko	6	6
(South Korea) S-w Kwon	3	4
Q	(South Korea) Kim Cheong-eui	4	4
Q	(China) Y Bai	6	6
(Chinese Taipei) J Jung	3	6	7^{7}
(South Korea) D-h Lee	6	2	6^{1}
Q	(Japan) Yuya Kibi	2	4
4	(Russia) E Donskoy	6	6
7	(India) Y Bhambri	3	3
(Australia) J Millman	6	6
(Japan) H Moriya	6	6
(Australia) M Polmans	2	4
WC	(Chinese Taipei) T-l Wu	4	6^{4}
(South Africa) L Harris	6	7^{7}
(Australia) M Purcell	6	0	6
2	(Israel) D Sela	4	6	3

Second round
5	(Slovakia) L Lacko	7	6
Q	(China) Y Bai	5	2
(Chinese Taipei) J Jung	1	6^{4}
4	(Russia) E Donskoy	6	7^{7}
(Australia) J Millman	6	3	6
(Japan) H Moriya	1	6	3
(South Africa) L Harris	6^{3}	7^{7}	7^{7}
(Australia) M Purcell	7^{7}	6^{5}	6^{4}

Quarterfinals
5	(Slovakia) L Lacko	2	4
4	(Russia) E Donskoy	6	6
(Australia) J Millman	6^{4}	3
(South Africa) L Harris	7^{7}	6

Semifinals
4	(Russia) E Donskoy	6	6
(South Africa) L Harris	3	3
