= 2017 OEC Kaohsiung – Doubles =

Doubles
- 2017 OEC Kaohsiung

Final
- Champions: (Thailand) Sanchai Ratiwatana (Thailand) Sonchat Ratiwatana
- Runners-up: (Israel) Jonathan Erlich (Austria) Alexander Peya
- Score: 6–4, 1–6, [10–6]

Events
Singles	Doubles
← 2016 ·	OEC Kaohsiung	· 2018 →

Sanchai and Sonchat Ratiwatana were the defending champions and successfully defended their title, defeating Jonathan Erlich and Alexander Peya 6–4, 1–6, [10–6] in the final.

== Seeds ==
1. (United States) Scott Lipsky / (India) Divij Sharan (semifinals)
2. (United States) James Cerretani / (Australia) Marc Polmans (semifinals)
3. (Israel) Jonathan Erlich / (Austria) Alexander Peya (final)
4. (Thailand) Sanchai Ratiwatana / (Thailand) Sonchat Ratiwatana (champions)

== Draw ==
=== Key ===
- Q = Qualifier
- WC = Wild card
- LL = Lucky loser
- Alt = Alternate
- SE = Special exempt
- PR = Protected ranking
- ITF = ITF entry
- JE = Junior exempt
- w/o = Walkover
- r = Retired
- d = Defaulted
- SR = Special ranking

First round
1	(United States) S Lipsky (India) D Sharan	6	6
WC	(Chinese Taipei) J-c Hung (Chinese Taipei) C-y Yu	1	4
WC	(Chinese Taipei) Y-h Hsu (Chinese Taipei) T-l Wu	6	3	[10]
WC	(Chinese Taipei) J Jung (Chinese Taipei) J Wang	2	6	[7]
3	(Israel) J Erlich (Austria) A Peya	4	6	[10]
(Slovakia) L Lacko (Czech Republic) L Rosol	6	3	[5]
(Australia) J Millman (Japan) H Moriya	4	6	[5]
(Chinese Taipei) C-p Hsieh (Chinese Taipei) H-y Peng	6	4	[10]
(Germany) A Begemann (Australia) A Santillan	6	6
(South Korea) S-w Kwon (South Korea) D-h Lee	2	4
(Australia) M Purcell (Australia) L Saville	4	2
4	(Thailand) Sa Ratiwatana (Thailand) So Ratiwatana	6	6
(Chinese Taipei) T-h Yang (Chinese Taipei) C-h Yi	6	6
(South Africa) L Harris (Israel) D Sela	4	3
(India) J Nedunchezhiyan (India) V Vardhan	2	4
2	(United States) J Cerretani (Australia) M Polmans	6	6

Quarterfinals
1	(United States) S Lipsky (India) D Sharan	6	6
WC	(Chinese Taipei) Y-h Hsu (Chinese Taipei) T-l Wu	2	1
3	(Israel) J Erlich (Austria) A Peya	7^{8}	6
(Chinese Taipei) C-p Hsieh (Chinese Taipei) H-y Peng	6^{6}	1
(Germany) A Begemann (Australia) A Santillan	4	6	[4]
4	(Thailand) Sa Ratiwatana (Thailand) So Ratiwatana	6	4	[10]
(Chinese Taipei) T-h Yang (Chinese Taipei) C-h Yi	7^{7}	2	[4]
2	(United States) J Cerretani (Australia) M Polmans	6^{4}	6	[10]

Semifinals
1	(United States) S Lipsky (India) D Sharan	5	3
3	(Israel) J Erlich (Austria) A Peya	7	6
4	(Thailand) Sa Ratiwatana (Thailand) So Ratiwatana	7	6
2	(United States) J Cerretani (Australia) M Polmans	5	3

Final
3	(Israel) J Erlich (Austria) A Peya	4	6	[6]
4	(Thailand) Sa Ratiwatana (Thailand) So Ratiwatana	6	1	[10]
