= 2016 OEC Kaohsiung =

- Date: 17–25 September
- Edition: 5th
- Surface: Hard
- Location: Kaohsiung, Taiwan

Champions

Singles
- (South Korea) Chung Hyeon

Doubles
- (Thailand) Sanchai Ratiwatana / (Thailand) Sonchat Ratiwatana
← 2015 ·	OEC Kaohsiung	· 2017 →

The 2016 OEC Kaohsiung was a professional tennis tournament played on hard courts. It was the fifth edition of the tournament which was part of the 2016 ATP Challenger Tour. It took place in Kaohsiung, Taiwan between 17 and 25 September 2016.

== Singles main-draw entrants ==
=== Seeds ===
Country	Player	Rank^{1}	Seed
AUS	John Millman	68	1
TPE	Lu Yen-hsun	71	2
ISR	Dudi Sela	74	3
AUS	Jordan Thompson	93	4
JPN	Yoshihito Nishioka	96	5
JPN	Yūichi Sugita	98	6
SVK	Jozef Kovalík	123	7
USA	Denis Kudla	130	8

- ^{1} Rankings are as of September 12, 2016.

=== Other entrants ===
The following players received wildcards into the singles main draw:

- (Chinese Taipei) Jimmy Wang
- (Chinese Taipei) Lee Kuan-yi
- (Chinese Taipei) Yang Tsung-hua
- (Chinese Taipei) Wu Tung-lin

The following player received entry into the singles main draw using a protected ranking:

- (Croatia) Matija Pecotić

The following players received entry from the qualifying draw:

- (Japan) Yuya Kibi
- (Indonesia) Christopher Rungkat
- (Japan) Takuto Niki
- (Japan) Yasutaka Uchiyama

== Champions ==
=== Singles ===
- (South Korea) Hyeon Chung def. (South Korea) Lee Duck-hee, 6–4, 6–2.

=== Doubles ===
- (Thailand) Sanchai Ratiwatana / (Thailand) Sonchat Ratiwatana def. (Chinese Taipei) Hsieh Cheng-peng / (Chinese Taipei) Yi Chu-huan, 6–4, 7–6^{(7–4)}
