= 2016 OEC Kaohsiung – Singles =

Singles
- 2016 OEC Kaohsiung

Final
- Champion: (South Korea) Chung Hyeon
- Runner-up: (South Korea) Lee Duck-hee
- Score: 6–4, 6–2

Events
Singles	Doubles
← 2015 ·	OEC Kaohsiung	· 2017 →

Chung Hyeon was the defending champion and successfully defended his title after defeating Lee Duck-hee 6–4, 6–2 in the final.

== Seeds ==
1. (Australia) John Millman (second round)
2. (Chinese Taipei) Lu Yen-hsun (semifinals)
3. (Israel) Dudi Sela (second round)
4. (Australia) Jordan Thompson (second round)
5. (Japan) Yoshihito Nishioka (first round)
6. (Japan) Yūichi Sugita (semifinals)
7. (Slovakia) Jozef Kovalík (first round)
8. (United States) Denis Kudla (first round)

== Draw ==
=== Key ===
- Q = Qualifier
- WC = Wild card
- LL = Lucky loser
- Alt = Alternate
- SE = Special exempt
- PR = Protected ranking
- ITF = ITF entry
- JE = Junior exempt
- w/o = Walkover
- r = Retired
- d = Defaulted
- SR = Special ranking

=== Finals ===
Semifinals
(South Korea) Lee Duck-hee	6	6
6	(Japan) Yūichi Sugita	2	3
(South Korea) Chung Hyeon	6	3	7^{7}
2	(Chinese Taipei) Lu Yen-hsun	2	6	6^{2}

Final
(South Korea) Lee Duck-hee	4	2
(South Korea) Chung Hyeon	6	6

=== Top half ===
First round
1	(Australia) J Millman	6	6
WC	(Chinese Taipei) J Wang	3	2
Q	(Japan) Y Uchiyama	6	0
(Switzerland) H Laaksonen	4	0^{r}
(Japan) H Moriya	6^{6}	4
(South Korea) D-h Lee	7^{8}	6
Q	(Japan) T Niki	1	6	6
7	(Slovakia) J Kovalík	6	2	1
3	(Israel) D Sela	6	6
(Japan) G Soeda	4	4
(Russia) A Karatsev	6^{2}	4^{r}
PR	(Croatia) M Pecotić	7^{7}	5
(Australia) M Ebden	6	6
WC	(Chinese Taipei) K-y Lee	3	2
(United States) A Sarkissian	4	5
6	(Japan) Y Sugita	6	7

Second round
1	(Australia) J Millman	5	6	6^{4}
Q	(Japan) Y Uchiyama	7	3	7^{7}
(South Korea) D-h Lee	6	6
Q	(Japan) T Niki	4	3
3	(Israel) D Sela	4	6	1
PR	(Croatia) M Pecotić	6	4	6
(Australia) M Ebden	6^{4}	3
6	(Japan) Y Sugita	7^{7}	6

Quarterfinals
Q	(Japan) Y Uchiyama	4	4
(South Korea) D-h Lee	6	6
PR	(Croatia) M Pecotić	6	6^{3}	3
6	(Japan) Y Sugita	4	7^{7}	6

Semifinals
(South Korea) D-h Lee	6	6
6	(Japan) Y Sugita	2	3

=== Bottom half ===
First round
5	(Japan) Y Nishioka	4	3
(Chinese Taipei) J Jung	6	6
Q	(Indonesia) C Rungkat	6	6^{2}	6^{3}
(Israel) A Weintraub	4	7^{7}	7^{7}
(South Korea) H Chung	6	6
WC	(Chinese Taipei) T-h Yang	0	4
(Japan) A Santillan	1	3
4	(Australia) J Thompson	6	6
8	(United States) D Kudla	5	6^{8}
WC	(Chinese Taipei) T-l Wu	7	7^{10}
(Australia) A Whittington	6^{4}	2
Q	(Japan) Yuya Kibi	7^{7}	6
(Chinese Taipei) T Chen	2	4
(Italy) L Vanni	6	6
(China) Z Zhang	5	2
2	(Chinese Taipei) Y-h Lu	7	6

Second round
(Chinese Taipei) J Jung	3	4
(Israel) A Weintraub	6	6
(South Korea) H Chung	6^{9}	6	7^{7}
4	(Australia) J Thompson	7^{11}	4	6^{5}
WC	(Chinese Taipei) T-l Wu	3	4
Q	(Japan) Y Kibi	6	6
(Italy) L Vanni	3	2
2	(Chinese Taipei) Y-h Lu	6	6

Quarterfinals
(Israel) A Weintraub	4	4
(South Korea) H Chung	6	6
Q	(Japan) Y Kibi	1	2
2	(Chinese Taipei) Y-h Lu	6	6

Semifinals
(South Korea) H Chung	6	3	7^{7}
2	(Chinese Taipei) Y-h Lu	2	6	6^{2}
