= 2012 OEC Kaohsiung – Singles =

Singles
- 2012 OEC Kaohsiung

Final
- Champion: (Japan) Go Soeda
- Runner-up: (Japan) Tatsuma Ito
- Score: 6–3, 6–0

Events
Singles	Doubles
← 2011 ·	OEC Kaohsiung	· 2013 →

Go Soeda won the first edition of the tournament after beating Tatsuma Ito 6–3, 6–0 in the final.

== Seeds ==
1. (Chinese Taipei) Yen-Hsun Lu (quarterfinals)
2. (Japan) Go Soeda (champion)
3. (Japan) Tatsuma Ito (final)
4. (South Africa) Rik de Voest (first round)
5. (Belgium) Ruben Bemelmans (first round)
6. (Switzerland) Marco Chiudinelli (semifinals)
7. (United Kingdom) James Ward (quarterfinals)
8. (Russia) Alexander Kudryavtsev (second round)

== Draw ==
=== Key ===
- Q = Qualifier
- WC = Wild card
- LL = Lucky loser
- Alt = Alternate
- SE = Special exempt
- PR = Protected ranking
- ITF = ITF entry
- JE = Junior exempt
- w/o = Walkover
- r = Retired
- d = Defaulted
- SR = Special ranking

=== Finals ===
Semifinals
6	(Switzerland) Marco Chiudinelli	4	6	4
3	(Japan) Tatsuma Ito	6	2	6
(France) Vincent Millot	3	1^{r}
2	(Japan) Go Soeda	6	2

Final
3	(Japan) Tatsuma Ito	3	0
2	(Japan) Go Soeda	6	6

=== Top half ===
First round
1	(Chinese Taipei) Lu Y-H	6	7
(Thailand) D Udomchoke	3	5
WC	(Chinese Taipei) Wang Chieh-fu	3	0
(Israel) A Weintraub	6	6
(South Africa) R Klaasen	4	6	4
(Slovakia) K Čapkovič	6	2	6
(India) Y Bhambri	2	7	0
6	(Switzerland) M Chiudinelli	6	5	6
3	(Japan) T Ito	6	7
(Australia) J Millman	4	5
WC	(Chinese Taipei) Yi Chu-huan	6	1	4
Q	(Russia) Victor Baluda	1	6	6
Q	(New Zealand) D King-Turner	7^{7}	6
(Japan) Y Sugita	6^{3}	4
LL	(Japan) Y Uchiyama	5	1
8	(Russia) A Kudryavtsev	7	6

Second round
1	(Chinese Taipei) Lu Y-H	6	6
(Israel) A Weintraub	4	4
(Slovakia) K Čapkovič	2	3
6	(Switzerland) M Chiudinelli	6	6
3	(Japan) T Ito	6	6
Q	(Russia) Victor Baluda	3	4
Q	(New Zealand) D King-Turner	4	6	7
8	(Russia) A Kudryavtsev	6	3	5

Quarterfinals
1	(Chinese Taipei) Lu Y-H	4	6	1
6	(Switzerland) M Chiudinelli	6	1	6
3	(Japan) T Ito	7	3	6
Q	(New Zealand) D King-Turner	5	6	3

Semifinals
6	(Switzerland) M Chiudinelli	4	6	4
3	(Japan) T Ito	6	2	6

=== Bottom half ===
First round
5	(Belgium) R Bemelmans	2	3
(France) V Millot	6	6
(Chinese Taipei) Chen T	1	4
(Chinese Taipei) Yang T-h	6	6
Q	(Bosnia and Herzegovina) M Bašić	6	3	6
WC	(Chinese Taipei) Huang Liang-chi	4	6	3
WC	(Chinese Taipei) Lee H-h	7	3	7^{14}
4	(South Africa) R de Voest	5	6	6^{12}
7	(United Kingdom) J Ward	6	6
Q	(China) Ouyang Bowen	4	3
(Japan) Hiroki Moriya	7^{8}	6
(Denmark) F Nielsen	6^{6}	0
(Chinese Taipei) J Wang	6	6
(Ukraine) D Molchanov	3	1
(Russia) K Kravchuk	3	4
2	(Japan) G Soeda	6	6

Second round
(France) V Millot	6	3	7^{8}
(Chinese Taipei) Yang T-h	2	6	6^{6}
Q	(Bosnia and Herzegovina) M Bašić	6	6
WC	(Chinese Taipei) Lee H-h	2	2
7	(United Kingdom) J Ward	6	6
(Japan) Hiroki Moriya	1	2
(Chinese Taipei) J Wang	4	5^{r}
2	(Japan) G Soeda	6	5

Quarterfinals
(France) V Millot	5	7	7
Q	(Bosnia and Herzegovina) M Bašić	7	5	5
7	(United Kingdom) J Ward	4	1
2	(Japan) G Soeda	6	6

Semifinals
(France) V Millot	3	1^{r}
2	(Japan) G Soeda	6	2
