= 2012 OEC Kaohsiung – Doubles =

Doubles
- 2012 OEC Kaohsiung

Final
- Champions: (United States) John Paul Fruttero (South Africa) Raven Klaasen
- Runners-up: (Chinese Taipei) Hsieh Cheng-peng (Chinese Taipei) Lee Hsin-han
- Score: 6–7^{(6–8)}, 7–5, [10–8]

Events
Singles	Doubles
← 2011 ·	OEC Kaohsiung	· 2013 →

John Paul Fruttero and Raven Klaasen won the first edition of the tournament by defeating Hsieh Cheng-peng and Lee Hsin-han 6–7^{(6–8)}, 7–5, [10–8] in the final.

== Seeds ==
1. (Russia) Alexander Kudryavtsev / (Ukraine) Denys Molchanov (quarterfinals)
2. (United States) John Paul Fruttero / (South Africa) Raven Klaasen (champion)
3. (Thailand) Sanchai Ratiwatana / (Thailand) Sonchat Ratiwatana (quarterfinals)
4. (Chinese Taipei) Hsieh Cheng-peng / (Chinese Taipei) Lee Hsin-han (semifinals)

== Draw ==
=== Key ===
- Q = Qualifier
- WC = Wild card
- LL = Lucky loser
- Alt = Alternate
- SE = Special exempt
- PR = Protected ranking
- ITF = ITF entry
- JE = Junior exempt
- w/o = Walkover
- r = Retired
- d = Defaulted
- SR = Special ranking

=== Draw ===
First round
1	(Russia) A Kudryavtsev (Ukraine) D Molchanov	6	6
(Japan) T Ito (Japan) G Soeda	3	4
(Slovakia) K Čapkovič (Israel) A Weintraub	6^{4}	3
(New Zealand) D King-Turner (Denmark) F Nielsen	7^{7}	6
4	(Chinese Taipei) C-p Hsieh (Chinese Taipei) H-h Lee	6	6
(Japan) Y Sugita (Japan) Y Uchiyama	2	3
(India) P Raja (India) D Sharan	6	7^{7}
WC	(Chinese Taipei) Chen I-ta (Chinese Taipei) Huang Liang-chi	4	6^{5}
(South Africa) R de Voest (Chinese Taipei) Y-H Lu	7^{7}	6
(Thailand) D Udomchoke (Chinese Taipei) J Wang	6^{5}	4
WC	(Chinese Taipei) T Chen (Chinese Taipei) Wang Chieh-fu	2	4
3	(Thailand) Sa Ratiwatana (Thailand) So Ratiwatana	6	6
(Russia) K Kravchuk (Russia) D Matsukevitch	6^{1}	6	[3]
(Chinese Taipei) T-h Yang (Chinese Taipei) Yi Chu-huan	7^{7}	1	[10]
WC	(Chinese Taipei) Peng Hsien-yin (Japan) B Sato	6	4	[10]
2	(United States) JP Fruttero (South Africa) R Klaasen	4	6	[12]

Quarterfinals
1	(Russia) A Kudryavtsev (Ukraine) D Molchanov	2	1
(New Zealand) D King-Turner (Denmark) F Nielsen	6	6
4	(Chinese Taipei) C-p Hsieh (Chinese Taipei) H-h Lee	2	6	[10]
(India) P Raja (India) D Sharan	6	3	[4]
(South Africa) R de Voest (Chinese Taipei) Y-H Lu	5	7^{7}	[10]
3	(Thailand) Sa Ratiwatana (Thailand) So Ratiwatana	7	6^{4}	[5]
(Chinese Taipei) T-h Yang (Chinese Taipei) Yi Chu-huan	4	2
2	(United States) JP Fruttero (South Africa) R Klaasen	6	6

Semifinals
(New Zealand) D King-Turner (Denmark) F Nielsen	1	6	[10]
4	(Chinese Taipei) C-p Hsieh (Chinese Taipei) H-h Lee	6	4	[1]
(South Africa) R de Voest (Chinese Taipei) Y-H Lu	4	2
2	(United States) JP Fruttero (South Africa) R Klaasen	6	6

Final
(New Zealand) D King-Turner (Denmark) F Nielsen	7^{8}	5	[8]
2	(United States) JP Fruttero (South Africa) R Klaasen	6^{6}	7	[10]
