= 2018 OEC Kaohsiung =

- Date: 17–23 September
- Edition: 7th
- Surface: Hard
- Location: Kaohsiung, Taiwan

Champions

Singles
- (France) Gaël Monfils

Doubles
- (Chinese Taipei) Hsieh Cheng-peng / (Chinese Taipei) Yang Tsung-hua
← 2017 ·	OEC Kaohsiung	· 2019 →

The 2018 OEC Kaohsiung was a professional tennis tournament played on hard courts. It was the seventh edition of the tournament which was part of the 2018 ATP Challenger Tour. It took place in Kaohsiung, Taiwan between 17 and 23 September 2018.

== Singles main-draw entrants ==
=== Seeds ===
Country	Player	Rank^{1}	Seed
FRA	Gaël Monfils	42	1
TUN	Malek Jaziri	63	2
AUS	Jason Kubler	92	3
TPE	Jason Jung	121	4
RSA	Lloyd Harris	131	5
IND	Ramkumar Ramanathan	135	6
LAT	Ernests Gulbis	146	7
IND	Prajnesh Gunneswaran	162	8

- ^{1} Rankings are as of 10 September 2018.

=== Other entrants ===
The following players received wildcards into the singles main draw:

- (Latvia) Ernests Gulbis
- (France) Gaël Monfils
- (Chinese Taipei) Tseng Chun-hsin
- (Chinese Taipei) Wu Tung-lin

The following players received entry into the singles main draw as special exempts:

- (Slovenia) Blaž Kavčič
- (China) Li Zhe

The following players received entry from the qualifying draw:

- (South Korea) Chung Yun-seong
- (Portugal) Frederico Ferreira Silva
- (South Korea) Kwon Soon-woo
- (Australia) Akira Santillan

The following player received entry as a lucky loser:

- (Japan) Yūichi Sugita

== Champions ==
=== Singles ===
- (France) Gaël Monfils def. (South Korea) Kwon Soon-woo 6–4, 2–6, 6–1.

=== Doubles ===
- (Chinese Taipei) Hsieh Cheng-peng / (Chinese Taipei) Yang Tsung-hua def. (Chinese Taipei) Hsu Yu-hsiou / (Chinese Taipei) Jimmy Wang 6–7^{(3–7)}, 6–2, [10–8].
