= 2014 OEC Kaohsiung =

- Date: 14–20 July
- Edition: 3rd
- Surface: Hard
- Location: Kaohsiung, Taiwan

Champions

Singles
- (Chinese Taipei) Lu Yen-hsun

Doubles
- (China) Gong Maoxin / (Chinese Taipei) Peng Hsien-yin
← 2013 ·	OEC Kaohsiung	· 2015 →

The 2014 OEC Kaohsiung was a professional tennis tournament played on hard courts. It was the third edition of the tournament which was part of the 2014 ATP Challenger Tour. It took place in Kaohsiung, Taiwan between 14 and 20 July 2014.

== Singles main-draw entrants ==
=== Seeds ===
Country	Player	Rank^{1}	Seed
TPE	Lu Yen-hsun	42	1
SLO	Blaž Kavčič	85	2
JPN	Go Soeda	102	3
JPN	Yūichi Sugita	139	4
RUS	Alexander Kudryavtsev	158	5
SUI	Marco Chiudinelli	176	6
ITA	Thomas Fabbiano	179	7
UKR	Denys Molchanov	214	8

- ^{1} Rankings are as of 7 July 2014.

=== Other entrants ===
The following players received wildcards into the singles main draw:

- (Chinese Taipei) Ho Chih-Jen
- (Chinese Taipei) Hung Jui-chen
- (Chinese Taipei) Lu Yen-hsun
- (Chinese Taipei) Wang Chieh-fu

The following players received entry from the qualifying draw:

- (South Korea) Nam Ji-sung
- (Spain) Jaime Pulgar-Garcia
- (Japan) Shuichi Sekiguchi
- (Japan) Kento Takeuchi

== Doubles main-draw entrants ==
=== Seeds ===
Country	Player	Country	Player	Rank^{1}	Seed
CHN	Gong Maoxin	TPE	Peng Hsien-yin	329	1
TPE	Chen Ti	TPE	Huang Liang-chi	398	2
UKR	Denys Molchanov	TPE	Yang Tsung-hua	529	3
AUS	Ryan Agar	IND	Jeevan Nedunchezhiyan	554	4

- ^{1} Rankings as of 7 July 2014.

=== Other entrants ===
The following pairs received wildcards into the doubles main draw:

- (Chinese Taipei) Wu Tung-lin / (Chinese Taipei) Yi Chu-huan
- (Chinese Taipei) Chen I-Ta / (Chinese Taipei) Ho Chih-Jen
- (Chinese Taipei) Hsieh Cheng-peng / (Chinese Taipei) Yang Shao-Chi

== Champions ==
=== Singles ===
- (Chinese Taipei) Lu Yen-hsun def. (Italy) Luca Vanni 6–7^{(7–9)}, 6–4, 6–4

=== Doubles ===
- (China) Gong Maoxin / (Chinese Taipei) Peng Hsien-yin def. (Chinese Taipei) Chen Ti / (Chinese Taipei) Huang Liang-chi 6–3, 6–2
