= 2018 OEC Kaohsiung – Singles =

Singles
- 2018 OEC Kaohsiung

Final
- Champion: (France) Gaël Monfils
- Runner-up: (South Korea) Kwon Soon-woo
- Score: 6–4, 2–6, 6–1

Events
Singles	Doubles
← 2017 ·	OEC Kaohsiung	· 2019 →

Evgeny Donskoy was the defending champion but chose not to defend his title.

Gaël Monfils won the title after defeating Kwon Soon-woo 6–4, 2–6, 6–1 in the final.

== Seeds ==
1. (France) Gaël Monfils (champion)
2. (Tunisia) Malek Jaziri (semifinals)
3. (Australia) Jason Kubler (first round)
4. (Chinese Taipei) Jason Jung (second round)
5. (South Africa) Lloyd Harris (second round)
6. (India) Ramkumar Ramanathan (second round)
7. (Latvia) Ernests Gulbis (quarterfinals)
8. (India) Prajnesh Gunneswaran (first round)

== Draw ==
=== Key ===
- Q = Qualifier
- WC = Wild card
- LL = Lucky loser
- Alt = Alternate
- ITF = ITF entry
- PR = Protected ranking
- SR = Special ranking
- SE = Special exempt
- JE = Junior exempt
- JR = Junior Accelerator Programme entrant
- CO = College Accelerator Programme entrant
- NG = Next Gen Accelerator Program entrant
- w/o = Walkover
- r = Retired
- d = Defaulted

=== Finals ===
Semifinals
1/WC	(France) Gaël Monfils	6	6
(South Korea) Lee Duck-hee	1	1
Q	(South Korea) Kwon Soon-woo	6	6
2	(Tunisia) Malek Jaziri	3	4

Final
1/WC	(France) Gaël Monfils	6	2	6
Q	(South Korea) Kwon Soon-woo	4	6	1

=== Top half ===
First round
1/WC	(France) G Monfils	5	6	6
Q	(Australia) A Santillan	7	3	4
(Japan) G Soeda	7^{7}	7^{7}
LL	(Japan) Y Sugita	6^{4}	6^{4}
(Japan) Y Uchiyama	7	6
SE	(Slovenia) B Kavčič	5	2
(Kazakhstan) A Bublik	1^{r}
7/WC	(Latvia) E Gulbis	3
4	(Chinese Taipei) J Jung	6	6
Q	(South Korea) Y-s Chung	3	4
(Bosnia and Herzegovina) T Brkić	2	6^{5}
(South Korea) D-h Lee	6	7^{7}
(Japan) Y Nishioka	3	0
Q	(Portugal) F Ferreira Silva	6	6
(Austria) M Neuchrist	4	2
6	(India) R Ramanathan	6	6

Second round
1/WC	(France) G Monfils	6	6
(Japan) G Soeda	2	3
(Japan) Y Uchiyama	2	4
7/WC	(Latvia) E Gulbis	6	6
4	(Chinese Taipei) J Jung	6^{5}	4
(South Korea) D-h Lee	7^{7}	6
Q	(Portugal) F Ferreira Silva	3	6	7^{7}
6	(India) R Ramanathan	6	4	6^{4}

Quarterfinals
1/WC	(France) G Monfils	7^{7}	6
7/WC	(Latvia) E Gulbis	6^{4}	2
(South Korea) D-h Lee	6	7
Q	(Portugal) F Ferreira Silva	2	5

Semifinals
1/WC	(France) G Monfils	6	6
(South Korea) D-h Lee	1	1

=== Bottom half ===
First round
5	(South Africa) L Harris	6^{5}	6	6
(United Kingdom) J Ward	7^{7}	3	2
WC	(Chinese Taipei) T-l Wu	3	2
Q	(South Korea) S-w Kwon	6	6
(Japan) H Moriya	4	3
(Chinese Taipei) T-h Yang	6	6
(Canada) B Schnur	6	7^{7}
3	(Australia) J Kubler	4	6^{4}
8	(India) P Gunneswaran	3	7	3
(Austria) J Rodionov	6	5	6
(Australia) M Purcell	7^{7}	5	3
WC	(Chinese Taipei) C-h Tseng	6^{4}	7	6
(Canada) F Peliwo	3	0
(Italy) F Gaio	6	6
SE	(China) Z Li	2	2
2	(Tunisia) M Jaziri	6	6

Second round
5	(South Africa) L Harris	3	5
Q	(South Korea) S-w Kwon	6	7
(Chinese Taipei) T-h Yang	5	3
(Canada) B Schnur	7	6
(Austria) J Rodionov	6	1	6
WC	(Chinese Taipei) C-h Tseng	4	6	3
(Italy) F Gaio	3	6^{4}
2	(Tunisia) M Jaziri	6	7^{7}

Quarterfinals
Q	(South Korea) S-w Kwon	6	6
(Canada) B Schnur	3	4
(Austria) J Rodionov	4	7^{8}	4
2	(Tunisia) M Jaziri	6	6^{6}	6

Semifinals
Q	(South Korea) S-w Kwon	6	6
2	(Tunisia) M Jaziri	3	4

== Bibliography ==
- Main Draw
- Qualifying Draw
