= 2015 OEC Kaohsiung – Doubles =

Doubles
- 2015 OEC Kaohsiung

Final
- Champions: (Chinese Taipei) Hsieh Cheng-peng (Chinese Taipei) Yang Tsung-hua
- Runners-up: (China) Gong Maoxin (Chinese Taipei) Peng Hsien-yin
- Score: 6–2, 6–2

Events
Singles	Doubles
← 2014 ·	OEC Kaohsiung	· 2016 →

Gong Maoxin and Peng Hsien-yin were the defending champions, but lost in the final to Hsieh Cheng-peng and Yang Tsung-hua 6–2, 6–2.

== Seeds ==
1. (Thailand) Sanchai Ratiwatana / (Thailand) Sonchat Ratiwatana (quarterfinals)
2. (China) Gong Maoxin / (Chinese Taipei) Peng Hsien-yin (final)
3. (India) Yuki Bhambri / (Chinese Taipei) Yi Chu-huan (semifinals)
4. (India) Somdev Devvarman / (India) Jeevan Nedunchezhiyan (semifinals)

== Draw ==
=== Key ===
- Q = Qualifier
- WC = Wild card
- LL = Lucky loser
- Alt = Alternate
- SE = Special exempt
- PR = Protected ranking
- ITF = ITF entry
- JE = Junior exempt
- w/o = Walkover
- r = Retired
- d = Defaulted
- SR = Special ranking

First round
1	(Thailand) Sa Ratiwatana (Thailand) So Ratiwatana	6	6
(United States) D Nguyen (United States) A Sarkissian	3	3
(Chinese Taipei) C-p Hsieh (Chinese Taipei) T-h Yang	6	6
(Chinese Taipei) H-h Lee (Israel) A Weintraub	1	2
4	(India) S Devvarman (India) J Nedunchezhiyan	3	6	[10]
WC	(Chinese Taipei) Wei-De Lee (Chinese Taipei) Cing-Yang Meng	6	0	[7]
(Colombia) N Barrientos (Argentina) M Trungelliti	6	6
(Australia) M Ebden (Chinese Taipei) C-f Wang	4	2
(Chinese Taipei) T Chen (Chinese Taipei) L-c Huang	6	6
(Italy) T Fabbiano (Italy) L Vanni	1	0
(France) J Eysseric (Estonia) J Zopp	2	6	[7]
3	(India) Y Bhambri (Chinese Taipei) C-h Yi	6	3	[10]
(Germany) P Gojowczyk (Australia) L Saville	4	6	[9]
WC	(Japan) B Sato (Chinese Taipei) T-l Wu	6	2	[11]
WC	(Chinese Taipei) Chih-Jen Ho (Chinese Taipei) J-c Hung	2	1
2	(China) M Gong (Chinese Taipei) H-y Peng	6	6

Quarterfinals
1	(Thailand) Sa Ratiwatana (Thailand) So Ratiwatana	0	7^{7}	[7]
(Chinese Taipei) C-p Hsieh (Chinese Taipei) T-h Yang	6	6^{5}	[10]
4	(India) S Devvarman (India) J Nedunchezhiyan	w/o
(Colombia) N Barrientos (Argentina) M Trungelliti
(Chinese Taipei) T Chen (Chinese Taipei) L-c Huang	0	7	[7]
3	(India) Y Bhambri (Chinese Taipei) C-h Yi	6	5	[10]
WC	(Japan) B Sato (Chinese Taipei) T-l Wu	4	4
2	(China) M Gong (Chinese Taipei) H-y Peng	6	6

Semifinals
(Chinese Taipei) C-p Hsieh (Chinese Taipei) T-h Yang	6	6
4	(India) S Devvarman (India) J Nedunchezhiyan	2	3
3	(India) Y Bhambri (Chinese Taipei) C-h Yi	4	4
2	(China) M Gong (Chinese Taipei) H-y Peng	6	6

Final
(Chinese Taipei) C-p Hsieh (Chinese Taipei) T-h Yang	6	6
2	(China) M Gong (Chinese Taipei) H-y Peng	2	2
