= 2015 OEC Kaohsiung =

- Date: 21–27 September
- Edition: 4th
- Surface: Hard
- Location: Kaohsiung, Taiwan

Champions

Singles
- (South Korea) Chung Hyeon

Doubles
- (Chinese Taipei) Hsieh Cheng-peng / (Chinese Taipei) Yang Tsung-hua
← 2014 ·	OEC Kaohsiung	· 2016 →

The 2015 OEC Kaohsiung was a professional tennis tournament played on hard courts. It was the fourth edition of the tournament which was part of the 2015 ATP Challenger Tour. It took place in Kaohsiung, Taiwan between 21 and 27 September 2015.

== Singles main-draw entrants ==
=== Seeds ===
Country	Player	Rank^{1}	Seed
CZE	Jiří Veselý	40	1
KOR	Chung Hyeon	75	2
CZE	Lukáš Rosol	85	3
IND	Yuki Bhambri	125	4
JPN	Tatsuma Ito	127	5
AUS	Matthew Ebden	133	6
ITA	Luca Vanni	135	7
EST	Jürgen Zopp	156	8

- ^{1} Rankings are as of September 14, 2015.

=== Other entrants ===
The following players received wildcards into the singles main draw:

- (Czech Republic) Jiří Veselý
- (India) Yuki Bhambri
- (Chinese Taipei) Wang Chieh-fu
- (Chinese Taipei) Hung Jui-chen

The following players received entry with a protected ranking:

- (Israel) Amir Weintraub

The following players received entry from the qualifying draw:

- (Chinese Taipei) Lee Kuan-yi
- (Australia) Harry Bourchier
- (Japan) Tatsuma Ito
- (Chinese Taipei) Yi Chu-huan

== Champions ==
=== Singles ===
- (South Korea) Chung Hyeon def. (India) Yuki Bhambri, 7–5, 6–4

=== Doubles ===
- (Chinese Taipei) Hsieh Cheng-peng / (Chinese Taipei) Yang Tsung-hua def. (China) Gong Maoxin / (Chinese Taipei) Yin-Hsien Peng, 6–2, 6–2
