= 2018 OEC Kaohsiung – Doubles =

Doubles
- 2018 OEC Kaohsiung

Final
- Champions: (Chinese Taipei) Hsieh Cheng-peng (Chinese Taipei) Yang Tsung-hua
- Runners-up: (Chinese Taipei) Hsu Yu-hsiou (Chinese Taipei) Jimmy Wang
- Score: 6–7^{(3–7)}, 6–2, [10–8]

Events
Singles	Doubles
← 2017 ·	OEC Kaohsiung	· 2019 →

Sanchai and Sonchat Ratiwatana were the defending champions but lost in the semifinals to Hsieh Cheng-peng and Yang Tsung-hua.

Hsieh and Yang won the title after defeating Hsu Yu-hsiou and Jimmy Wang 6–7^{(3–7)}, 6–2, [10–8] in the final.

== Seeds ==
1. (United States) Austin Krajicek / (India) Jeevan Nedunchezhiyan (semifinals)
2. (India) Sriram Balaji / (India) Vishnu Vardhan (quarterfinals)
3. (China) Gong Maoxin / (China) Zhang Ze (withdrew)
4. (Thailand) Sanchai Ratiwatana / (Thailand) Sonchat Ratiwatana (semifinals)

== Draw ==
=== Key ===
- Q = Qualifier
- WC = Wild card
- LL = Lucky loser
- Alt = Alternate
- SE = Special exempt
- PR = Protected ranking
- ITF = ITF entry
- JE = Junior exempt
- w/o = Walkover
- r = Retired
- d = Defaulted
- SR = Special ranking

First round
1	(United States) A Krajicek (India) J Nedunchezhiyan	6	7^{8}
(France) T Lamasine (Japan) H Moriya	4	6^{6}
(Australia) B Mousley (Chinese Taipei) H-y Peng	6	6
WC	(Chinese Taipei) K-y Lee (Chinese Taipei) C-y Yu	4	4
Alt	(China) X Gao (China) F Sun	6^{5}	2
(Australia) A Santillan (United Kingdom) J Ward	7^{7}	6
WC	(Chinese Taipei) Y-h Hsu (Chinese Taipei) J Wang	6	7^{7}
(South Africa) L Harris (Australia) M Purcell	4	6^{5}
(Bosnia and Herzegovina) T Brkić (Austria) J Rodionov	6	6
WC	(Chinese Taipei) T Chen (Chinese Taipei) R Ho	4	4
(United States) A Lawson (China) Z Li	4	5
4	(Thailand) Sa Ratiwatana (Thailand) So Ratiwatana	6	7
(Chinese Taipei) C-p Hsieh (Chinese Taipei) T-h Yang	6	6
(India) VS Prashanth (India) R Ramanathan	4	4
(Japan) Y Sugita (Chinese Taipei) C-h Yi	1	5
2	(India) S Balaji (India) V Vardhan	6	7

Quarterfinals
1	(United States) A Krajicek (India) J Nedunchezhiyan	6	6
(Australia) B Mousley (Chinese Taipei) H-y Peng	3	4
(Australia) A Santillan (United Kingdom) J Ward	7^{7}	6^{2}	[4]
WC	(Chinese Taipei) Y-h Hsu (Chinese Taipei) J Wang	6^{2}	7^{7}	[10]
(Bosnia and Herzegovina) T Brkić (Austria) J Rodionov	4	5
4	(Thailand) Sa Ratiwatana (Thailand) So Ratiwatana	6	7
(Chinese Taipei) C-p Hsieh (Chinese Taipei) T-h Yang	7^{7}	6
2	(India) S Balaji (India) V Vardhan	6^{3}	4

Semifinals
1	(United States) A Krajicek (India) J Nedunchezhiyan	6^{4}	1
WC	(Chinese Taipei) Y-h Hsu (Chinese Taipei) J Wang	7^{7}	6
4	(Thailand) Sa Ratiwatana (Thailand) So Ratiwatana	3	4
(Chinese Taipei) C-p Hsieh (Chinese Taipei) T-h Yang	6	6

Final
WC	(Chinese Taipei) Y-h Hsu (Chinese Taipei) J Wang	7^{7}	2	[8]
(Chinese Taipei) C-p Hsieh (Chinese Taipei) T-h Yang	6^{3}	6	[10]
