= 2017 OEC Kaohsiung =

- Date: 2–8 October
- Edition: 6th
- Surface: Hard
- Location: Kaohsiung, Taiwan

Champions

Singles
- (Russia) Evgeny Donskoy

Doubles
- (Thailand) Sanchai Ratiwatana / (Thailand) Sonchat Ratiwatana
← 2016 ·	OEC Kaohsiung	· 2018 →

The 2017 OEC Kaohsiung was a professional tennis tournament played on hard courts. It was the sixth edition of the tournament which was part of the 2017 ATP Challenger Tour. It took place in Kaohsiung, Taiwan between 2 and 8 October 2017.

== Singles main-draw entrants ==
=== Seeds ===
Country	Player	Rank^{1}	Seed
AUS	Jordan Thompson	70	1
ISR	Dudi Sela	77	2
ROU	Marius Copil	83	3
RUS	Evgeny Donskoy	88	4
SVK	Lukáš Lacko	118	5
RUS	Mikhail Youzhny	120	6
IND	Yuki Bhambri	155	7
AUS	Akira Santillan	163	8

- ^{1} Rankings are as of 25 September 2017.

=== Other entrants ===
The following players received wildcards into the singles main draw:

- (South Korea) Chung Yun-seong
- (Chinese Taipei) Hsu Yu-hsiou
- (Chinese Taipei) Wu Tung-lin
- (Chinese Taipei) Yang Tsung-hua

The following players received entry from the qualifying draw:

- (China) Bai Yan
- (Germany) Andre Begemann
- (Japan) Yuya Kibi
- (South Korea) Kim Cheong-eui

The following player received entry as a lucky loser:

- (Australia) Marinko Matosevic

== Champions ==
=== Singles ===
- (Russia) Evgeny Donskoy def. (Romania) Marius Copil 7–6^{(7–0)}, 7–5.

=== Doubles ===
- (Thailand) Sanchai Ratiwatana / (Thailand) Sonchat Ratiwatana def. (Israel) Jonathan Erlich / (Austria) Alexander Peya 6–4, 1–6, [10–6].
