= 2019 OEC Kaohsiung =

- Date: 16–22 September
- Edition: 8th
- Surface: Hard
- Location: Kaohsiung, Taiwan

Champions

Singles
- (Australia) John Millman

Doubles
- (Chinese Taipei) Hsieh Cheng-peng / (Chinese Taipei) Yang Tsung-hua
← 2018 ·	OEC Kaohsiung	· 2020 →

The 2019 OEC Kaohsiung was a professional tennis tournament played on hard courts. It was the eighth edition of the tournament which was part of the 2019 ATP Challenger Tour. It took place in Kaohsiung, Taiwan between 16 and 22 September 2019.

== Singles main-draw entrants ==
=== Seeds ===
Country	Player	Rank^{1}	Seed
POL	Kamil Majchrzak	84	1
IND	Prajnesh Gunneswaran	85	2
AUS	John Millman	95	3
~~AUS~~	~~Bernard Tomic~~	~~107~~	~~4~~
CZE	Jiří Veselý	131	5
TPE	Jason Jung	132	6
JPN	Go Soeda	134	7
JPN	Yūichi Sugita	141	8
AUS	Alex Bolt	144	9
AUS	Marc Polmans	159	10
JPN	Yasutaka Uchiyama	165	11
CAN	Steven Diez	170	12
AUS	Andrew Harris	197	13
ESP	Enrique López Pérez	218	14
JPN	Yosuke Watanuki	231	15
JPN	Hiroki Moriya	232	16

- ^{1} Rankings are as of 9 September 2019.

=== Other entrants ===
The following players received wildcards into the singles main draw:

- (Chinese Taipei) Ray Ho
- (Chinese Taipei) Hsieh Cheng-peng
- (Chinese Taipei) Hsu Yu-hsiou
- (Chinese Taipei) Lo Chien-hsun
- (Chinese Taipei) Yu Cheng-yu

The following player received entry into the singles main draw using a protected ranking:

- (Netherlands) Miliaan Niesten

The following players received entry from the qualifying draw:

- (Japan) Yusuke Takahashi
- (Japan) Jumpei Yamasaki

The following players received entry as lucky losers:

- (Chinese Taipei) Lee Kuan-yi
- (Chinese Taipei) Tsai Chang-lin

== Champions ==
=== Singles ===
- (Australia) John Millman def. (Australia) Marc Polmans 6–4, 6–2.

=== Doubles ===
- (Chinese Taipei) Hsieh Cheng-peng / (Chinese Taipei) Yang Tsung-hua def. (United States) Evan King / (United States) Hunter Reese 6–4, 7–6^{(7–4)}.
