= 2012 OEC Kaohsiung =

- Date: 23–29 April
- Edition: 1st
- Surface: Hard
- Location: Kaohsiung, Taiwan

Champions

Singles
- (Japan) Go Soeda

Doubles
- (United States) John Paul Fruttero / (South Africa) Raven Klaasen
OEC Kaohsiung	· 2013 →

The 2012 OEC Kaohsiung was a professional tennis tournament played on hard courts. It was the first edition of the tournament which was part of the 2012 ATP Challenger Tour. It took place in Kaohsiung, Taiwan between 23 and 29 April 2012.

== Singles main-draw entrants ==
=== Seeds ===
Country	Player	Rank^{1}	Seed
TPE	Lu Yen-hsun	56	1
JPN	Go Soeda	75	2
JPN	Tatsuma Ito	95	3
RSA	Rik de Voest	138	4
BEL	Ruben Bemelmans	142	5
SUI	Marco Chiudinelli	148	6
GBR	James Ward	150	7
RUS	Alexander Kudryavtsev	162	8

- ^{1} Rankings are as of April 16, 2012.

=== Other entrants ===
The following players received wildcards into the singles main draw:

- (Chinese Taipei) Huang Liang-chi
- (Chinese Taipei) Lee Hsin-han
- (Chinese Taipei) Wang Chieh-fu
- (Chinese Taipei) Yi Chu-huan

The following players received entry from the qualifying draw:

- (Russia) Victor Baluda
- (Bosnia and Herzegovina) Mirza Bašić
- (New Zealand) Daniel King-Turner
- (China) Ouyang Bowen

The following players received entry from the qualifying draw as a lucky loser:

- (Japan) Yasutaka Uchiyama

== Champions ==
=== Singles ===
- (Japan) Go Soeda def. (Japan) Tatsuma Ito, 6–3, 6–0

=== Doubles ===
- (United States) John Paul Fruttero / (South Africa) Raven Klaasen def. (Chinese Taipei) Hsieh Cheng-peng / (Chinese Taipei) Lee Hsin-han, 6–7^{(6–8)}, 7–5, [10–8]
