= Chung Hyeon =

South Korean tennis player

Hyeon Chung
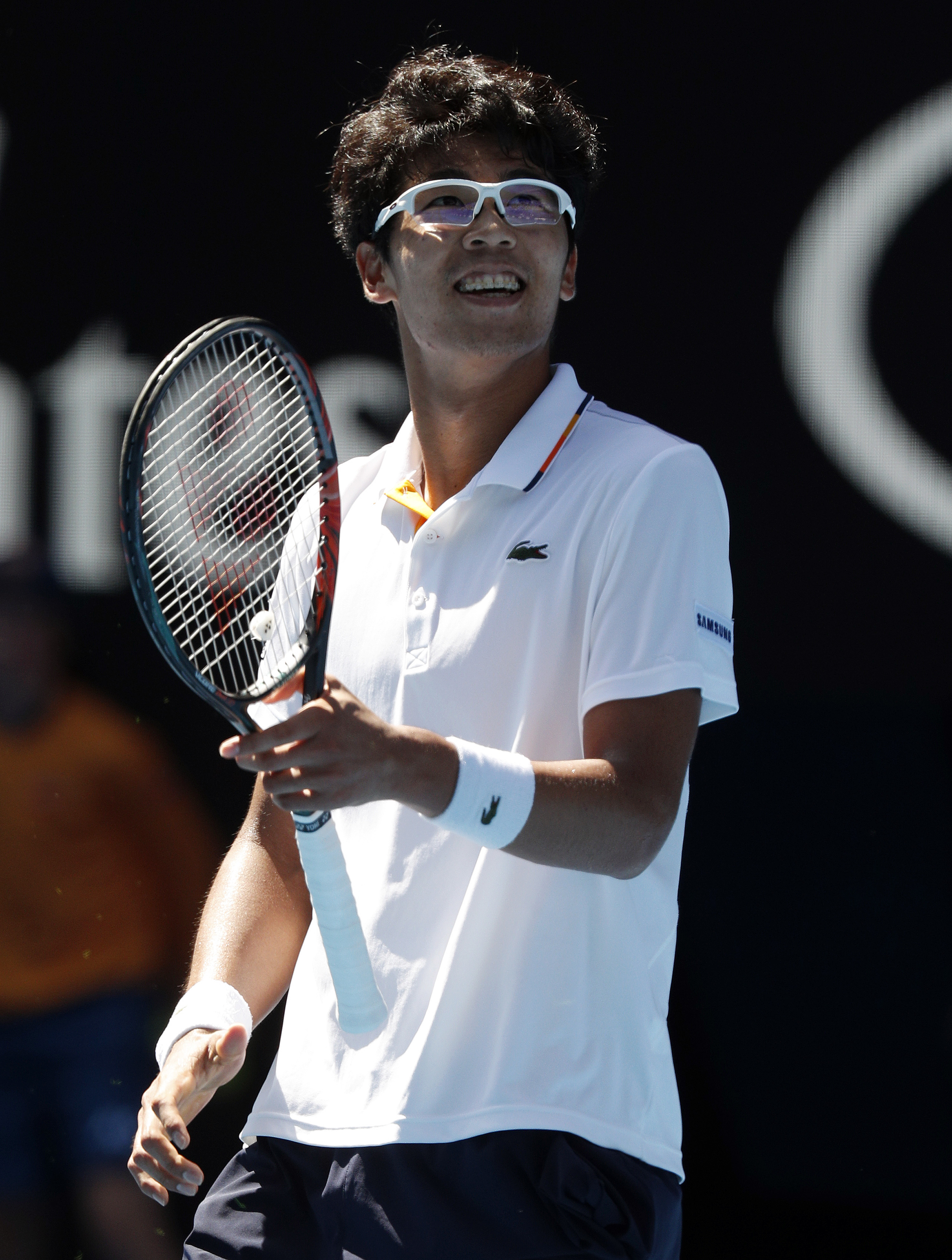
- Hyeon Chung at the 2018 Australian Open
- Country (sports): South Korea
- Residence: Suwon, South Korea
- Born: 19 May 1996 (age 30) Suwon, South Korea
- Height: 1.88 m (6 ft 2 in)
- Turned pro: 2014
- Plays: Right-handed (two-handed backhand)
- Coach: Neville Godwin
- Prize money: US $3,792,259

Singles
- Career record: 88–71
- Career titles: 0
- Highest ranking: No. 19 (2 April 2018)
- Current ranking: No. 549 (14 September 2026)

Grand Slam singles results
- Australian Open: SF (2018)
- French Open: 3R (2017)
- Wimbledon: 1R (2015)
- US Open: 3R (2019)

Doubles
- Career record: 11–14
- Career titles: 0
- Highest ranking: No. 187 (11 April 2016)

Grand Slam doubles results
- Australian Open: 3R (2018)
- French Open: 1R (2017)
- US Open: 2R (2017)

Mixed doubles
- Career record: 0–1

Grand Slam mixed doubles results
- Australian Open: 1R (2016)
Medal record
Representing South Korea
Men's tennis
Asian Games
Gold medal – first place	2014 Incheon	Men's doubles
Universiade
Gold medal – first place	2015 Gwangju	Men's singles
Gold medal – first place	2015 Gwangju	Men's team
- Last updated on: 16 September 2026.

- Chung Hyeon
- Hangul: 정현
- Hanja: 鄭泫
- RR: Jeong Hyeon
- MR: Chŏng Hyŏn

Chung Hyeon (Korean: 정현; Hanja: 鄭泫; Korean pronunciation: [tɕəːŋ çʌn]; born 19 May 1996) is a South Korean professional tennis player. He is the 2017 Next Gen ATP Finals champion. As an unseeded player, he became the first Korean player to reach a Grand Slam semifinal at the 2018 Australian Open.

== Junior career ==
Chung took up tennis as a way to try to help maintain his eyesight after requiring glasses at a young age. He won the Eddie Herr International and Junior Orange Bowl Boys under-12s titles in December 2008, and was subsequently signed, along with his brother Chung Hong, to the Nick Bollettieri Tennis Academy at IMG in Florida. He began competing on the ITF junior tour in 2012, and was runner-up in the 2013 Wimbledon Boys' Singles, a month after winning his first Futures title. He later competed in his first ATP tournament, the Malaysian Open, being defeated in the first round. He reached a career junior high of No. 7, with an 84–32 win–loss record.

== Professional career ==
=== 2014: Asian Games doubles Gold medal ===
2014 saw Chung move full-time to the men's professional game, winning three Futures tournaments and the 2014 Bangkok Open, his first Challenger level tournament. He competed in the qualifying for the 2014 US Open and won two matches for the South Korea Davis Cup team to help keep them in the Asia/Oceania Zone Group I. He also won gold in the doubles competition at the 2014 Asian Games and ended 2014 ranked 151 in the ATP rankings.

=== 2015: Breakthrough ===
Chung reached the final qualifying round for the Australian Open, but focused his efforts on the Challenger Tour. He won at the Burnie Challenger in February to reach the world's top 150 and subsequently received a Wildcard for the ATP World Tour competition at the Miami Open, getting to the second round of this Masters level tournament. Two further Challenger titles followed in April and May 2015, which saw him enter the world top 100 for the first time. His rapid rise up the rankings and an error on behalf of the Korean Tennis Federation meant that he missed the entry deadline for the 2015 French Open. Although he was later handed a wildcard into the qualifying tournament, he was eliminated in the first round. Chung then lost in straight sets to unranked Nicholas Monroe in the first round of qualifiers in the Topshelf Open. In the 2015 Wimbledon Championships, he reached his first main draw in a Grand Slam tournament, losing in five sets in the first round to Pierre-Hugues Herbert. Immediately following his first round loss at Wimbledon, Chung returned to his home country and won the Men's Singles and Men's Team events at the 2015 Summer Universiade in Gwangju. At the 2015 US Open, Chung qualified for the main draw and recorded his first win in a Grand Slam against James Duckworth. Chung lost in the second round against fifth seed Stanislas Wawrinka in straight sets, despite taking each set to a tiebreak. He continued to play on both the Challenger and ATP tour through 2015, winning a further Challenger at Kaohsiung in September and reaching his first ATP quarterfinal at the Shenzhen Open. He was awarded the year-end ATP Most Improved Player award for 2015, after climbing over 120 places to No. 51 in the rankings.

=== 2016: Injury-shortened season ===
Chung won his first round match in Brisbane against Sam Groth. He lost in the second round to the 3rd seed Marin Čilić. At the Australian Open Chung lost in the first round to Novak Djokovic.

In February, Chung lost in Sofia in the first round to qualifier Marius Copil. In Rotterdam Chung reached second round, where he lost to Viktor Troicki. In Marseille he lost in the first round to David Goffin. In Dubai Chung defeated Andreas Seppi in the first round. Then he lost to Roberto Bautista Agut, winning only a single game in this match. Chung won both singles in the Davis Cup tie against New Zealand. South Korea won 3–1.

After the 2016 French Open, Chung took nearly four months off to recover from an abdominal injury.

=== 2017: Top 50, Next Gen Finals champion ===
Chung scored his first Australian Open match by defeating Renzo Olivo. He lost in the second round against eventual semifinalist Grigor Dimitrov despite winning the first set. In April, Chung reached the quarterfinals of the 2017 Barcelona Open Banco Sabadell, taking Rafael Nadal to a tie-break before eventually losing. To reach the quarterfinals, Chung came through qualifying and the main draw to record six wins in a row without dropping a set, including victories over Denis Istomin, Phillip Kohlschreiber and Alexander Zverev.

In May, Chung competed at the 2017 BMW Open in Munich, reaching the semifinals. In the second round, Chung recorded a victory against Gael Monfils, who at a ranking of No. 16 was the highest-ranked player Chung had defeated. At the French Open, Chung achieved his first Grand Slam breakthrough by reaching the third round, including a win over 27th seed Sam Querrey in the first round. He lost against the eighth seed Kei Nishikori in five sets.

In August, Chung reached the third round of the Rogers Cup, his best result at an ATP Masters 1000 tournament to date, beating 13th-ranked David Goffin in the second round in straight sets. He qualified for the Next Generation ATP Finals in Milan and defeated Andrey Rublev in the final. As the undefeated champion, Chung won prize money of $390,000.

=== 2018: Major semifinal and top 20 debut ===
Chung picked up his first big result of the year by reaching the quarterfinals of the Auckland Open, recording a win over John Isner in the second round.

At the Australian Open, Chung made his breakthrough into the limelight by becoming the first South Korean player, male or female, to advance past the fourth round of a Grand Slam tournament. In the third round, he achieved his first victory over a Top 10 player, defeating world No. 4 Alexander Zverev in five sets. In the next round, Chung won a straight sets match against six-time Australian Open champion and former world number one Novak Djokovic, who had just returned from injury. This marked the first time since 2007 that Djokovic had lost in straight sets at the Australian Open. In the quarterfinals, Chung defeated unseeded American Tennys Sandgren to reach his first Grand Slam semifinal. He became the youngest Australian Open semifinalist since Marin Čilić in 2010 and the lowest ranked since then-No. 86 Marat Safin in 2004. Chung played Roger Federer in the semi-final, but withdrew due to foot blisters when he was close to going two sets down. The Korean also played the doubles event with Radu Albot and defeated the defending champions Henri Kontinen and John Peers.

Following the Australian Open, Chung went on to compete in the Delray Beach Open, where he defeated Cameron Norrie and Franko Škugor before bowing out to eventual winner Frances Tiafoe. He then played in the Mexican Open, where he defeated Donald Young and Ernesto Escobedo before losing to Kevin Anderson in straight sets.

At Indian Wells, Chung beat Dušan Lajović, Tomas Berdych and Pablo Cuevas to advance to his maiden Masters quarterfinals appearance, but lost to Roger Federer in straight sets. At Miami, Chung defeated Matthew Ebden, Michael Mmoh, and João Sousa, reaching the quarterfinals where he lost in straight sets to John Isner, who went on to win the tournament. He did not compete at the 2018 French Open or at the 2018 Wimbledon Championships.

=== 2019–2020: Return to tour, back to Challenger titles, US Open third round ===
Seeded 24th at the 2019 Australian Open, Chung faced Bradley Klahn in the first round. He narrowly lost the first two sets in tiebreakers, but came back to win in five sets, advancing to the second round where he lost in four sets to Pierre-Hugues Herbert.

In the 2019 season, he struggled with injury, falling outside of the top 150 from a career-high ranking of No. 19. Chung returned at 2019 Chengdu Challenger.

At the 2019 US Open he reached the third round for the first time at this Major, losing to the eventual champion Rafael Nadal. However, he did not play after October 2020 when he played two qualifying matches at the 2020 Roland Garros.

=== 2022–2023: Comeback ===
After two years of absence from the ATP tour he came back to play doubles with compatriot Kwon Soonwoo at the 2022 Korea Open. They won their first round match against Hans Hach Verdugo and Treat Huey in three sets and second against fourth seeds André Göransson and Ben McLachlan.

For his singles return he accepted a wildcard into the draw at the 2023 Seoul Challenger. In his first match back, he lost to Jordan Thompson in straight sets. His next match in Busan was an improvement, albeit unsuccessful, as he took a set against Yasutaka Uchiyama, eventually losing the match in three sets.

He entered the 2023 Surbiton Trophy using a protected ranking but was defeated by Andy Murray in the first round. He also entered the 2023 Nottingham Open but lost to third seed Nuno Borges.

== Equipment ==
Chung currently uses and endorses the Yonex Vcore Duel G 97 310g, but now has a paint job of the Yonex Vcore Pro 97 310g. Although the Duel G 97 is a 16x20, he has it specially having it strung at 16x19 and by skipping one cross string when stringing. His string of choice is the Luxilon ALU Power. He wears Lacoste apparel and wears Nike Air Zoom Vapor X as his shoe.

== ATP Next Generation finals ==
=== Singles: 1 (1 title) ===
Result	Date	Tournament	Surface	Opponent	Score
Win	2017	Next Generation ATP Finals, Italy	Hard (i)	(Russia) Andrey Rublev	3–4^{(5–7)}, 4–3^{(7–2)}, 4–2, 4–2

== ATP Challenger Tour finals ==
=== Singles: 12 (9 titles, 3 runner-ups) ===
Legend ATP Challenger Tour (9–3)	Finals by surface Hard (8–3) Clay (1–0) Grass (0–0) Carpet (0–0)

Result	W–L	Date	Tournament	Tier	Surface	Opponent	Score
Win	1–0	Aug 2014	Bangkok, Thailand	Challenger	Hard	(Australia) Jordan Thompson	7–6^{(7–0)}, 6–4
Win	2–0	Feb 2015	Burnie, Australia	Challenger	Hard	(Australia) Alex Bolt	6–2, 7–5
Loss	2–1	Feb 2015	Launceston, Australia	Challenger	Hard	(United States) Bjorn Fratangelo	6–4, 2–6, 5–7
Win	3–1	Apr 2015	Savannah, USA	Challenger	Clay (green)	(Republic of Ireland) James McGee	6–3, 6–2
Win	4–1	May 2015	Busan, South Korea	Challenger	Hard	(Slovakia) Lukáš Lacko	6–3, 6–1
Loss	4–2	May 2015	Seoul, South Korea	Challenger	Hard	(Japan) Go Soeda	6–3, 3–6, 3–6
Win	5–2	Sep 2015	Kaohsiung, Taiwan	Challenger	Hard	(India) Yuki Bhambri	7–5, 6–4
Loss	5–3	Sep 2016	Nanchang, China	Challenger	Hard	(Japan) Hiroki Moriya	6–4, 1–6, 4–6
Win	6–3	Sep 2016	Kaohsiung, Taiwan (2)	Challenger	Hard	(South Korea) Lee Duck-hee	6–4, 6–2
Win	7–3	Nov 2016	Kobe, Japan	Challenger	Hard (i)	(Australia) James Duckworth	6–4, 7–6^{(7–2)}
Win	8–3	Jan 2017	Maui, USA	Challenger	Hard	(Japan) Taro Daniel	7–6^{(7–3)}, 6–1
Win	9–3	Aug 2019	Chengdu, China	Challenger	Hard	(Japan) Yuichi Sugita	6–4, 6–3

== ITF Futures/World Tennis Tour finals ==
=== Singles: 12 (8 titles, 4 runner-ups) ===
Legend ITF Futures/WTT (8–4)	Finals by surface Hard (8–4) Clay (0–0) Grass (0–0) Carpet (0–0)

Result	W–L	Date	Tournament	Tier	Surface	Opponent	Score
Loss	0–1	May 2013	South Korea F2, Seoul	Futures	Hard	(United States) Daniel Nguyen	6–4, 5–7, 4–6
Win	1–1	Jun 2013	South Korea F6, Gimcheon	Futures	Hard	(Spain) Enrique López Pérez	6–2, 6–3
Win	2–1	Feb 2014	Thailand F1, Nonthaburi	Futures	Hard	(South Korea) Nam Ji-sung	6–2, 7–6^{(7–4)}
Win	3–1	Mar 2014	Thailand F3, Nonthaburi	Futures	Hard	(United Kingdom) Marcus Willis	6–2, 6–4
Loss	3–2	Mar 2014	China F3, Yuxi	Futures	Hard	(China) Zhang Ze	6–7^{(3–7)}, 6–7^{(3–7)}
Win	4–2	Jun 2014	South Korea F3, Changwon	Futures	Hard	(South Korea) Cho Min-hyeok	6–1, 2–6, 7–5
Loss	4–3	Jun 2014	South Korea F4, Daegu	Futures	Hard	(South Korea) Kim Cheong-eui	5–7, 6–7^{(5–7)}
Win	5–3	Jan 2025	M25 Bali, Indonesia	WTT	Hard	(United Kingdom) Giles Hussey	6–1, 6–2
Loss	5–4	Mar 2025	M25 Lu'an, China	WTT	Hard	(United Kingdom) Oliver Crawford	6–4, 3–6, 2–6
Win	6–4	Mar 2025	M15 Nishitokyo, Japan	WTT	Hard	(Japan) Takuya Kumasaka	6–4, 6–0
Win	7–4	Mar 2025	M15 Tsukuba, Japan	WTT	Hard	(Japan) Takuya Kumasaka	6–4, 3–6, 6–1
Win	8–4	May 2026	M25 Nakhon Pathom, Thailand	WTT	Hard	(Thailand) Kasidit Samrej	6–4, 6–2

== Performance timelines ==
Key
W	F	SF	QF	#R	RR	Q#	P#	DNQ	A	Z#	PO	G	S	B	NMS	NTI	P	NH

(W) winner; (F) finalist; (SF) semifinalist; (QF) quarterfinalist; (#R) rounds 4, 3, 2, 1; (RR) round-robin stage; (Q#) qualification round; (P#) preliminary round; (DNQ) did not qualify; (A) absent; (Z#) Davis/Fed Cup Zonal Group (with number indication) or (PO) play-off; (G) gold, (S) silver or (B) bronze Olympic/Paralympic medal; (NMS) not a Masters tournament; (NTI) not a Tier I tournament; (P) postponed; (NH) not held; (SR) strike rate (events won / competed); (W–L) win–loss record.
To avoid confusion and double counting, these charts are updated at the conclusion of a tournament or when the player's participation has ended.

=== Singles ===
Current through the 2021 Western & Southern Open.

Tournament	2013	2014	2015	2016	2017	2018	2019	2020	2021	SR	W–L	Win %
Grand Slam tournaments
Australian Open	A	A	Q3	1R	2R	SF	2R	A	A	0 / 4	7–4	64%
French Open	A	A	Q1	1R	3R	A	A	Q2	A	0 / 2	2–2	50%
Wimbledon	A	A	1R	A	A	A	A	NH	A	0 / 1	0–1	0%
US Open	A	Q2	2R	A	2R	2R	3R	A	A	0 / 4	5–4	55%
Win–loss	0–0	0–0	1–2	0–2	4–3	6–2	3–2	0–0	0–0	0 / 11	14–11	56%
Year-end championships
ATP Finals	Did not qualify									0 / 0	0–0	–
ATP Tour Masters 1000
Indian Wells Masters	A	A	A	1R	A	QF	A	NH	A	0 / 2	3–2	60%
Miami Open	A	A	2R	1R	1R	QF	A	NH	A	0 / 4	4–4	50%
Monte-Carlo Masters	A	A	A	A	A	A	A	NH	A	0 / 0	0–0	–
Madrid Open	A	A	A	A	A	1R	A	NH	A	0 / 1	0–1	0%
Italian Open	A	A	A	A	A	A	A	A	A	0 / 0	0–0	–
Canadian Open	A	A	1R	A	3R	A	A	NH	A	0 / 2	2–2	50%
Cincinnati Masters	A	A	Q2	A	1R	2R	A	A	A	0 / 2	1–2	33%
Shanghai Masters	A	A	Q2	A	2R	2R	A	NH		0 / 2	2–2	50%
Paris Masters	A	A	A	A	2R	A	A	A	A	0 / 1	1–1	50%
Win–loss	0–0	0–0	1–2	0–2	4–5	8–5	0–0	0–0	0–0	0 / 14	13–14	48%
National representation
Summer Olympics	Not Held			A	Not Held				A	0 / 0	0–0	–
Davis Cup	A	Z1	Z1	Z1	Z1	A	A	A	A	0 / 0	10–2	83%
Career statistics
	2013	2014	2015	2016	2017	2018	2019	2020	2021	Career		
Tournaments	1	0	9	13	19	18	8	0	0	68		
Titles	0	0	0	0	0	0	0	0	0	0		
Finals	0	0	0	0	0	0	0	0	0	0		
Overall win–loss	0–1	2–1	12–10	8–13	29–18	29–18	6–8	0–0	0–0	86–69		
Win%	0%	66%	54%	38%	62%	62%	43%	–	–	55.48%		
Year-end ranking	550	173	51	104	58	25	128	161	487	$3,382,228		

=== Doubles ===
Current through to 2021 Australian Open.

Tournament	2015	2016	2017	2018	2019	2020	2021	SR	W–L	Win %
Grand Slam tournaments
Australian Open	A	1R	A	3R	A	A	A	0 / 2	2–2	50%
French Open	A	A	1R	A	A	A	A	0 / 1	0–1	0%
Wimbledon	A	A	A	A	A	NH	A	0 / 0	0–0	–
US Open	1R	A	2R	A	A	A	A	0 / 2	1–2	33%
Win–loss	0–1	0–1	1–2	2–1	0–0	0–0	0–0	0 / 5	3–5	38%

== Record against top 10 players ==
Hyeon's match record against those who have been ranked in the top 10, with those who have been No. 1 in boldface

- (Russia) Andrey Rublev 3–1
- (Russia) **Daniil Medvedev** 2–0
- (Germany) Alexander Zverev 2–1
- (Cyprus) Marcos Baghdatis 1–0
- (Italy) Matteo Berrettini 1–0
- (France) Gaël Monfils 1–0
- (Canada) Milos Raonic 1–0
- (United States) Jack Sock 1–0
- (Spain) Roberto Bautista Agut 1–1
- (Serbia) **Novak Djokovic** 1–1
- (Canada) Denis Shapovalov 1–1
- (Spain) Fernando Verdasco 1–1
- (Czech Republic) Tomáš Berdych 1–2
- (Croatia) Marin Čilić 1–3
- (Belgium) David Goffin 1–3
- (United States) John Isner 1–3
- (Spain) Pablo Carreño Busta 0–1
- (Bulgaria) Grigor Dimitrov 0–1
- (Spain) David Ferrer 0–1
- (Italy) Fabio Fognini 0–1
- (France) Richard Gasquet 0–1
- (Latvia) Ernests Gulbis 0–1
- (United Kingdom) **Andy Murray** 0-1
- (Japan) Kei Nishikori 0–1
- (Argentina) Juan Martín del Potro 0–1
- (Switzerland) Stan Wawrinka 0–1
- (South Africa) Kevin Anderson 0–2
- (Switzerland) **Roger Federer** 0–2
- (Spain) **Rafael Nadal** 0–3

* Statistics correct as of 06 June 2023.

== Wins over top 10 players ==
**Season**	2014	2015	2016	2017	2018	2019	**Total**
**Wins**	0	0	0	0	1	0	**1**

#	Player	Rank	Event	Surface	Rd	Score	CH Rank
**2018**
1.	(Germany) Alexander Zverev	4	Australian Open, Melbourne, Australia	Hard	3R	5–7, 7–6^{(7–3)}, 2–6, 6–3, 6–0	58

Awards
Preceded by (Spain) Roberto Bautista Agut	ATP Most Improved Player; 2015	Succeeded by (France) Lucas Pouille
