= Jimmy Wang (tennis) =

Taiwanese professional tennis player

Wang Yeu-tzuoo 王宇佐
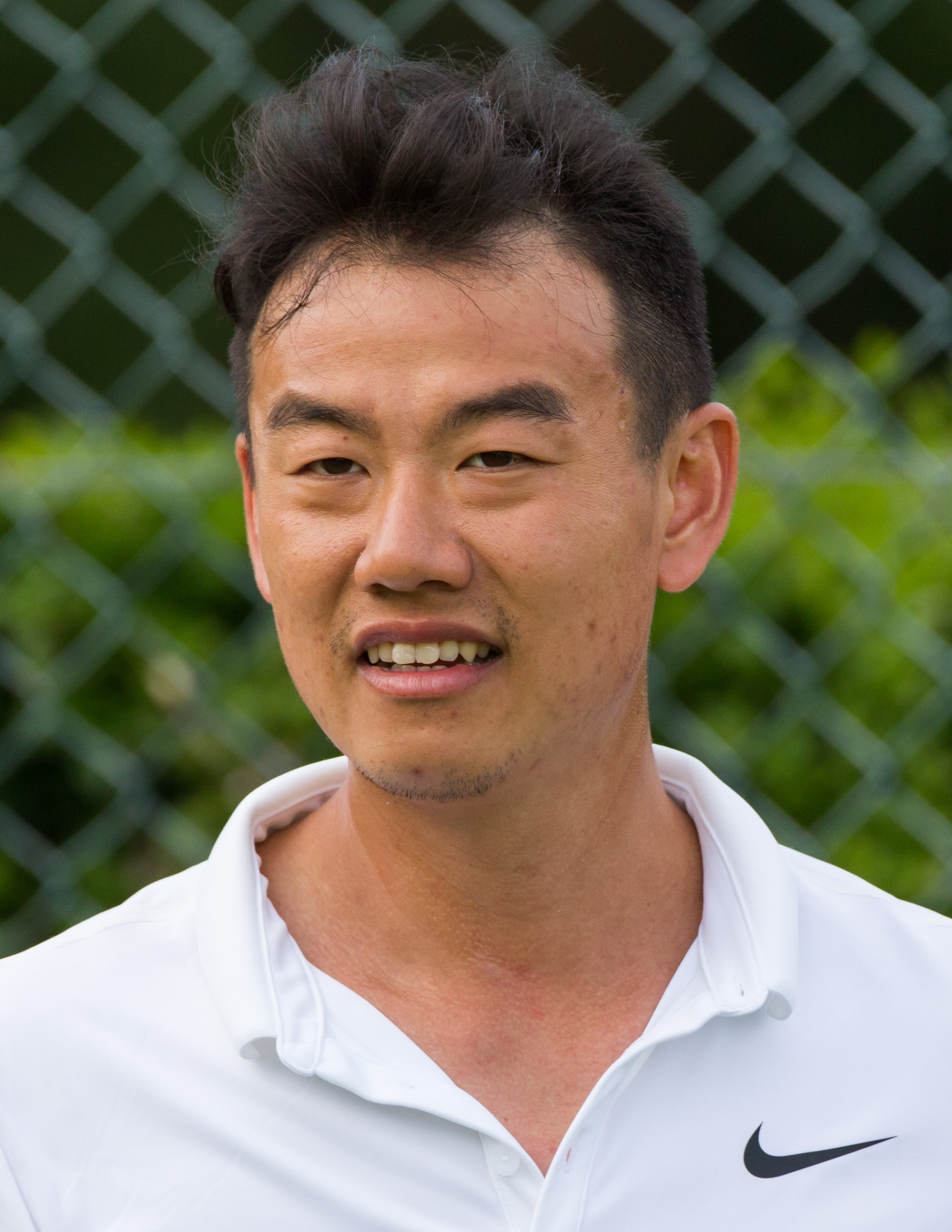
- Wang at the 2015 Wimbledon qualifying tournament
- Country (sports): Chinese Taipei
- Residence: Taipei, Taiwan
- Born: February 8, 1985 (age 40) Saudi Arabia
- Height: 1.80 m (5 ft 11 in)
- Turned pro: 2001
- Retired: 2019
- Plays: Right-handed (two-handed backhand)
- Prize money: US$ 1,150,226

Singles
- Career record: 41–48
- Career titles: 0
- Highest ranking: No. 85 (6 March 2006)

Grand Slam singles results
- Australian Open: 2R (2006)
- French Open: 1R (2006)
- Wimbledon: 3R (2014)
- US Open: 2R (2012)

Doubles
- Career record: 7–20
- Career titles: 0
- Highest ranking: No. 190 (22 July 2013)

Grand Slam doubles results
- Australian Open: 1R (2013)
- US Open: 1R (2006)

Grand Slam mixed doubles results
- Australian Open: 1R (2006)
Medal record
Men's Tennis
Representing Chinese Taipei
Asian Games
Bronze medal – third place	2006 Doha	Men's Team
East Asian Games
Gold medal – first place	2005 Macau	Men's singles
Summer Universiade
Bronze medal – third place	2005 Izmir	Men's singles

Jimmy Wang
- Traditional Chinese: 王宇佐
- Simplified Chinese: 王宇佐
Transcriptions
Standard Mandarin
- Hanyu Pinyin: Wáng Yǔzuǒ

Wang Yeu-tzuoo (Chinese: 王宇佐; pinyin: Wáng Yǔzuǒ), who also goes by Jimmy Wang, (born February 8, 1985) is a Taiwanese former professional tennis player. Until the emergence of Lu Yen-hsun, Wang was the highest ranked player from Taiwan. The right-hander stands 5 feet 10 inches and weighs 141 pounds. Wang's trademark look is his wearing a white baseball cap backwards.

== Tennis career ==
=== Juniors ===
Wang started playing tennis at age seven and quickly emerged as one of Asia's most highly touted junior players. He made the final of the 2001 Australian Open Boys' Singles (losing to Janko Tipsarević) and the final of the US Open Boys' Singles (losing to Gilles Müller).

As a junior, he compiled a 136–52 win–loss record in singles (and 78–57 in doubles), reaching as high as No. 3 in the world junior singles rankings in April 2001 (and No. 8 in doubles).

Junior Slam results – Singles:

Australian Open: F (2001)
French Open: 1R (2000, 2001)
Wimbledon: SF (2001)
US Open: F (2001)

=== Pro tour ===
Wang turned pro in 2003 and has improved his game and ranking year each he has been on the professional circuit. In 2005, Wang broke into the ATP Top 100 for the first time by virtue of three straight Challenger final appearances, winning a title at Istanbul, Turkey. The 21-year-old also reached the quarterfinal round of the ATP event in Bangkok, Thailand, and lost to Rafael Nadal in the 1st round in Beijing, China at the China Open. Wang made his Grand Slam debut at Wimbledon in 2004, losing to Andy Roddick in the first round. In 2006, he reached the second round, bowing out to James Blake 3 sets to 1.

Wang's best Grand Slam performance to date came at Wimbledon in 2014, where he defeated Alejandro González and Mikhail Youzhny to advance to the third round, ultimately losing to Jo-Wilfried Tsonga.

He was a member of the Chinese Taipei Davis Cup team, compiling a 17–6 record in Davis Cup action since 2001.

Near the end of his career, Wang took breaks from competing due to a persistent wrist injury. With several years of recovery, he decided to play in doubles while helping out the young players. He was content with the results during 2019 and briefly considered making a comeback for some time. However, Wang got tired of traveling around the world to train and compete, which made him start thinking about retirement from professional tennis. His decision was strengthened after getting married and the birth of his child, and Wang eventually started focusing on other things. In September 2019, he played his last match at the 2019 OEC Kaohsiung in doubles with Hsu Yu-hsiou.

== Junior Grand Slam finals ==
=== Singles: 2 (2 runners-up) ===
Result	Year	Tournament	Surface	Opponent	Score
Loss	2001	Australian Open	Hard	(Socialist Federal Republic of Yugoslavia) Janko Tipsarević	6–3, 5–7, 0–6
Loss	2001	US Open	Hard	(Luxembourg) Gilles Müller	6–7^{(5–7)}, 2–6

== Performance timeline ==
Key
W	F	SF	QF	#R	RR	Q#	DNQ	A	NH

(W) winner; (F) finalist; (SF) semifinalist; (QF) quarterfinalist; (#R) rounds 4, 3, 2, 1; (RR) round-robin stage; (Q#) qualification round; (DNQ) did not qualify; (A) absent; (NH) not held; (SR) strike rate (events won / competed); (W–L) win–loss record.
To avoid confusion and double counting, these charts are updated at the conclusion of a tournament or when the player's participation has ended.

=== Singles ===
Tournament	2002	2003	2004	2005	2006	2007	2008	2009	2010	2011	2012	2013	2014	2015	SR	W–L	Win %
Grand Slam tournaments
Australian Open	A	Q2	Q1	1R	2R	Q1	Q1	A	A	A	Q2	Q1	1R	1R	0 / 4	1–4	20%
French Open	A	A	A	Q1	1R	A	A	A	A	A	Q1	Q1	A	A	0 / 1	0–1	0%
Wimbledon	Q2	Q1	1R	Q2	2R	2R	Q1	A	A	A	1R	2R	3R	Q3	0 / 6	5–6	45%
US Open	Q2	A	Q1	Q2	1R	Q1	A	A	A	A	2R	Q2	Q3	A	0 / 2	1–2	33%
Win–loss	0–0	0–0	0–1	0–1	2–4	1–1	0–0	0–0	0–0	0–0	1–2	1–1	2–2	0–1	0 / 13	7–13	35%
ATP World Tour Masters 1000
Indian Wells	A	A	A	A	A	A	A	A	A	Q1	A	A	Q1	A	0 / 0	0–0	–
Miami	A	A	A	A	A	A	Q1	A	A	A	A	A	1R	A	0 / 1	0–1	0%
Canada Masters	A	A	Q1	A	A	A	A	A	A	A	A	A	A	A	0 / 0	0–0	–
Cincinnati	A	A	A	A	A	A	A	A	A	A	A	A	Q1	A	0 / 0	0–0	–
Shanghai	A	A	A	A	A	A	A	A	A	A	Q2	A	Q2	A	0 / 0	0–0	–
Win–loss	0–0	0–0	0–0	0–0	0–0	0–0	0–0	0–0	0–0	0–0	0–0	0–0	0–1	0–0	0 / 1	0–1	0%

== ATP Challenger and ITF Futures finals ==
=== Singles: 29 (13–16) ===
Legend ATP Challenger (5–9) ITF Futures (8–7)	Finals by surface Hard (13–15) Clay (0–0) Grass (0–0) Carpet (0–1)

Result	W–L	Date	Tournament	Tier	Surface	Opponent	Score
Win	1–0	May 2001	Japan F4, Fukuoka	Futures	Hard	(Japan) Gouichi Motomura	6–4, 2–0 ret.
Loss	1–1	Aug 2001	Chinese Taipei F2, Kao-Hsiung	Futures	Hard	(Japan) Tasuku Iwami	6–4, 5–7, 5–5 ret.
Loss	1–2	Nov 2001	Thailand F2, Nonthaburi	Futures	Hard	(Pakistan) Aisam Qureshi	4–6, 6–4, 5–7
Loss	1–3	Feb 2002	United Arab Emirates F2, Abu Dhabi	Futures	Hard	(Switzerland) Marco Chiudinelli	6–7^{(0–7)}, 2–6
Win	2–3	Apr 2002	Uzbekistan F1, Karshi	Futures	Hard	(Russia) Igor Kunitsyn	7–5, 6–4
Loss	2–4	Apr 2002	Uzbekistan F2, Guliston	Futures	Hard	(Slovakia) Branislav Sekáč	3–6, 6–2, 4–6
Win	3–4	May 2002	Fergana, Uzbekistan	Challenger	Hard	(Finland) Tuomas Ketola	6–3, 6–1
Loss	3–5	Jun 2002	Japan F5, Fukuoka	Futures	Hard	(Japan) Gouichi Motomura	2–6, 4–6 ret.
Win	4–5	Nov 2002	USA F28, Costa Mesa	Futures	Hard	(United States) Doug Bohaboy	4–6, 6–2, 6–2
Loss	4–6	Jun 2003	Andorra la Vella, Andorra	Challenger	Hard	(France) Gregory Carraz	2–6, 3–6
Win	5–6	Sep 2003	Indonesia F2, Jakarta	Futures	Hard	(Chinese Taipei) Ti Chen	7–6^{(7–4)}, 6–4
Loss	5–7	Oct 2003	Dharwad, India	Challenger	Hard	(Thailand) Danai Udomchoke	6–7^{(5–7)}, 1–6
Win	6–7	Nov 2003	Chinese Taipei F1, Kaohsiung	Futures	Hard	(Japan) Jun Kato	6–4, 6–1
Win	7–7	Mar 2005	Ho Chi Minh City, Vietnam	Challenger	Hard	(Germany) Tomas Behrend	6–3, 7–6^{(7–4)}
Win	8–7	Jun 2005	Spain F13, Lanzarote	Futures	Hard	(Russia) Artem Sitak	6–3, 6–3
Loss	8–8	Jul 2005	Valladolid, Spain	Challenger	Hard	(Sweden) Filip Prpic	2–6, 6–7^{(5–7)}
Loss	8–9	Aug 2005	Segovia, Spain	Challenger	Hard	(Germany) Michael Berrer	5–7, 7–6^{(8–6)}, 1–6
Win	9–9	Sep 2005	Istanbul, Turkey	Challenger	Hard	(Germany) Michael Berrer	4–6, 6–4, 6–3
Loss	9–10	Mar 2006	Wolfsburg, Germany	Challenger	Carpet	(Germany) Alexander Waske	2–6, 4–6
Loss	9–11	May 2007	Uzbekistan F2, Namangan	Futures	Hard	(Czech Republic) Lukáš Rosol	6–7^{(2–7)}, 4–6
Win	10–11	Jun 2007	Busan, South Korea	Challenger	Hard	(Czech Republic) Jan Vacek	6–3, 6–2
Win	11–11	Jul 2007	Recanati, Italy	Challenger	Hard	(Russia) Andrey Golubev	6–3, 3–6, 6–4
Win	12–11	May 2011	Mexico F3, Mexico City	Futures	Hard	(Mexico) Miguel Gallardo Valles	7–5, 7–5
Loss	12–12	Oct 2011	Seoul, South Korea	Challenger	Hard	(Chinese Taipei) Lu Yen-hsun	5–7, 3–6
Loss	12–13	Nov 2011	Thailand F5, Phuket	Futures	Hard	(France) Laurent Rochette	4–6, 6–7^{(4–7)}
Loss	12–14	Apr 2013	Leon, Mexico	Challenger	Hard	(United States) Donald Young	2–6, 2–6
Loss	12–15	Feb 2014	Chitre, Panama	Challenger	Hard	(United States) Wayne Odesnik	7–5, 4–6, 4–6
Loss	12–16	May 2014	Busan, South Korea	Challenger	Hard	(Japan) Go Soeda	3–6, 6–7^{(5–7)}
Win	13–16	Apr 2016	China F4, Zhangjiagang	Futures	Hard	(South Korea) Lee Duckhee	7–5, 6–3

=== Doubles: 16 (6–10) ===
Legend ATP Challenger (1–5) ITF Futures (5–5)	Finals by surface Hard (6–8) Clay (0–1) Grass (0–0) Carpet (0–1)

Result	W–L	Date	Tournament	Tier	Surface	Partner	Opponents	Score
Win	1–0	Dec 2001	Philippines F1, Manila	Futures	Hard	(Japan) Hiroki Kondo	(Indonesia) Hendri-Susilo Pramono (Indonesia) Febi Widhiyanto	6–2, 6–4
Win	2–0	Dec 2001	Philippines F2, Manila	Futures	Hard	(Japan) Hiroki Kondo	(South Africa) Dirk Stegmann (South Africa) Coenie Van Wyk	6–4, 6–4
Win	3–0	Apr 2002	China F1, Kunming	Futures	Hard	(Thailand) Danai Udomchoke	(United Kingdom) James Auckland (United Kingdom) Simon Dickson	5–7, 6–3, 6–2
Loss	3–1	Mar 2003	Kyoto, Japan	Challenger	Carpet	(Czech Republic) Jan Hájek	(Israel) Amir Hadad (Israel) Andy Ram	6–3, 3–6, 1–6
Loss	3–2	May 2004	Forest Hills, United States	Challenger	Clay	(Germany) Michael Berrer	(United States) Jason Marshall (Brazil) Bruno Soares	6–7^{(5–7)}, 3–6
Loss	3–3	Jun 2005	Spain F13, Lanzarote	Futures	Hard	(Chinese Taipei) Ti Chen	(Togo) Komlavi Loglo (Spain) Rafael Moreno-Negrin	5–7, 7–6^{(10–8)}, 4–6
Loss	3–4	Mar 2007	Ho Chi Minh City, Vietnam	Challenger	Hard	(Germany) Sebastian Rieschick	(China) Yu Xinyuan (China) Zeng Shaoxuan	6–7^{(2–7)}, 3–6
Loss	3–5	May 2007	Uzbekistan F2, Namangan	Futures	Hard	(Chinese Taipei) Ti Chen	(Czech Republic) Lukáš Rosol (Austria) Martin Slanar	2–6, 6–3, 1–6
Loss	3–6	May 2011	Mexico F3, Córdoba	Futures	Hard	(United States) Adam El Mihdawy	(Australia) Chris Letcher (Australia) Brendan Moore	4–6, 3–6
Win	4–6	Jun 2011	USA F14, Chico	Futures	Hard	(United States) Vahe Assadourian	(United Kingdom) Edward Corrie (United States) Trevor Dobson	6–4, 6–4
Win	5–6	Oct 2011	Indonesia F5, Palembang	Futures	Hard	(Thailand) Danai Udomchoke	(Finland) Harri Heliövaara (Japan) Hiroki Kondo	6–0, 6–1
Loss	5–7	Nov 2011	Thailand F4, Phuket	Futures	Hard	(Russia) Victor Baluda	(Thailand) Sonchat Ratiwatana (Thailand) Sanchai Ratiwatana	6–7^{(10–12)}, 4–6
Loss	5–8	Nov 2012	Helsinki, Finland	Challenger	Hard	(Belarus) Uladzimir Ignatik	(Russia) Mikhail Elgin (Slovakia) Igor Zelenay	6–4, 6–7^{(0–7)}, [4–10]
Win	6–8	Mar 2013	Le Gosier, Guadeloupe	Challenger	Hard	(Israel) Dudi Sela	(Romania) Florin Mergea (Germany) Philipp Marx	6–1, 6–2
Loss	6–9	Apr 2017	China F4, Luzhou	Futures	Hard	(Chinese Taipei) Peng Hsien-yin	(China) Gao Xin (China) Zhe Li	6–4, 3–6, [6–10]
Loss	6–10	Sep 2018	Kaohsiung, Taiwan	Challenger	Hard	(Chinese Taipei) Hsu Yu Hsiou	(Chinese Taipei) Hsieh Cheng-peng (Chinese Taipei) Yang Tsung-hua	7–6^{(7–3)}, 2–6, [2–10]
