= Kaohsiung Challenger =

OEC Kaohsiung
- 2019 OEC Kaohsiung

Defunct tennis tournament
- Location: Kaohsiung; Taiwan
- Category: ATP Challenger Tour
- Surface: Carpet / Indoors
- Draw: 32S/29Q/16D
- Prize money: $125,000+H
- Website: Website

The OEC Kaohsiung is a tennis tournament held in Kaohsiung, Taiwan since 2012. The event is part of the ATP Challenger Tour and is played on indoor carpet courts.

== Past finals ==
=== Singles ===
Year	Champion	Runner-up	Score
2019	(Australia) John Millman	(Australia) Marc Polmans	6–4, 6–2
2018	(France) Gaël Monfils	(South Korea) Kwon Soon-woo	6–4, 2–6, 6–1
2017	(Russia) Evgeny Donskoy	(Romania) Marius Copil	7–6^{(7–0)}, 7–5
2016	(South Korea) Chung Hyeon	(South Korea) Lee Duck-hee	6–4, 6–2
2015	(South Korea) Chung Hyeon	(India) Yuki Bhambri	7–5, 6–4
2014	(Chinese Taipei) Lu Yen-hsun	(Italy) Luca Vanni	6–7^{(7–9)}, 6–4, 6–4
2013	(Chinese Taipei) Lu Yen-hsun	(India) Yuki Bhambri	6–4, 6–3
2012	(Japan) Go Soeda	(Japan) Tatsuma Ito	6–3, 6–0

=== Doubles ===
Year	Champions	Runners-up	Score
2019	(Chinese Taipei) Hsieh Cheng-peng (Chinese Taipei) Yang Tsung-hua	(United States) Evan King (United States) Hunter Reese	6–4, 7–6^{(7–4)}
2018	(Chinese Taipei) Hsieh Cheng-peng (Chinese Taipei) Yang Tsung-hua	(Chinese Taipei) Hsu Yu-hsiou (Chinese Taipei) Jimmy Wang	6–7^{(3–7)}, 6–2, [10–8]
2017	(Thailand) Sanchai Ratiwatana (Thailand) Sonchat Ratiwatana	(Israel) Jonathan Erlich (Austria) Alexander Peya	6–4, 1–6, [10–6]
2016	(Thailand) Sanchai Ratiwatana (Thailand) Sonchat Ratiwatana	(Chinese Taipei) Hsieh Cheng-peng (Chinese Taipei) Yi Chu-huan	6–4, 7–6^{(7–4)}
2015	(Chinese Taipei) Hsieh Cheng-peng (Chinese Taipei) Yang Tsung-hua	(China) Gong Maoxin (Chinese Taipei) Peng Hsien-yin	6–2, 6–2
2014	(China) Gong Maoxin (Chinese Taipei) Peng Hsien-yin	(Chinese Taipei) Chen Ti (Chinese Taipei) Huang Liang-chi	6–3, 6–2
2013	(Colombia) Juan Sebastián Cabal (Colombia) Robert Farah	(India) Yuki Bhambri (Chinese Taipei) Wang Chieh-fu	6–4, 6–2
2012	(United States) John Paul Fruttero (South Africa) Raven Klaasen	(Chinese Taipei) Hsieh Cheng-peng (Chinese Taipei) Lee Hsin-han	6–7^{(6–8)}, 7–5, [10–8]

== See also ==
- List of sporting events in Taiwan
