= Wang Chieh-fu =

Taiwanese tennis player

Wang Chieh-fu 王介甫
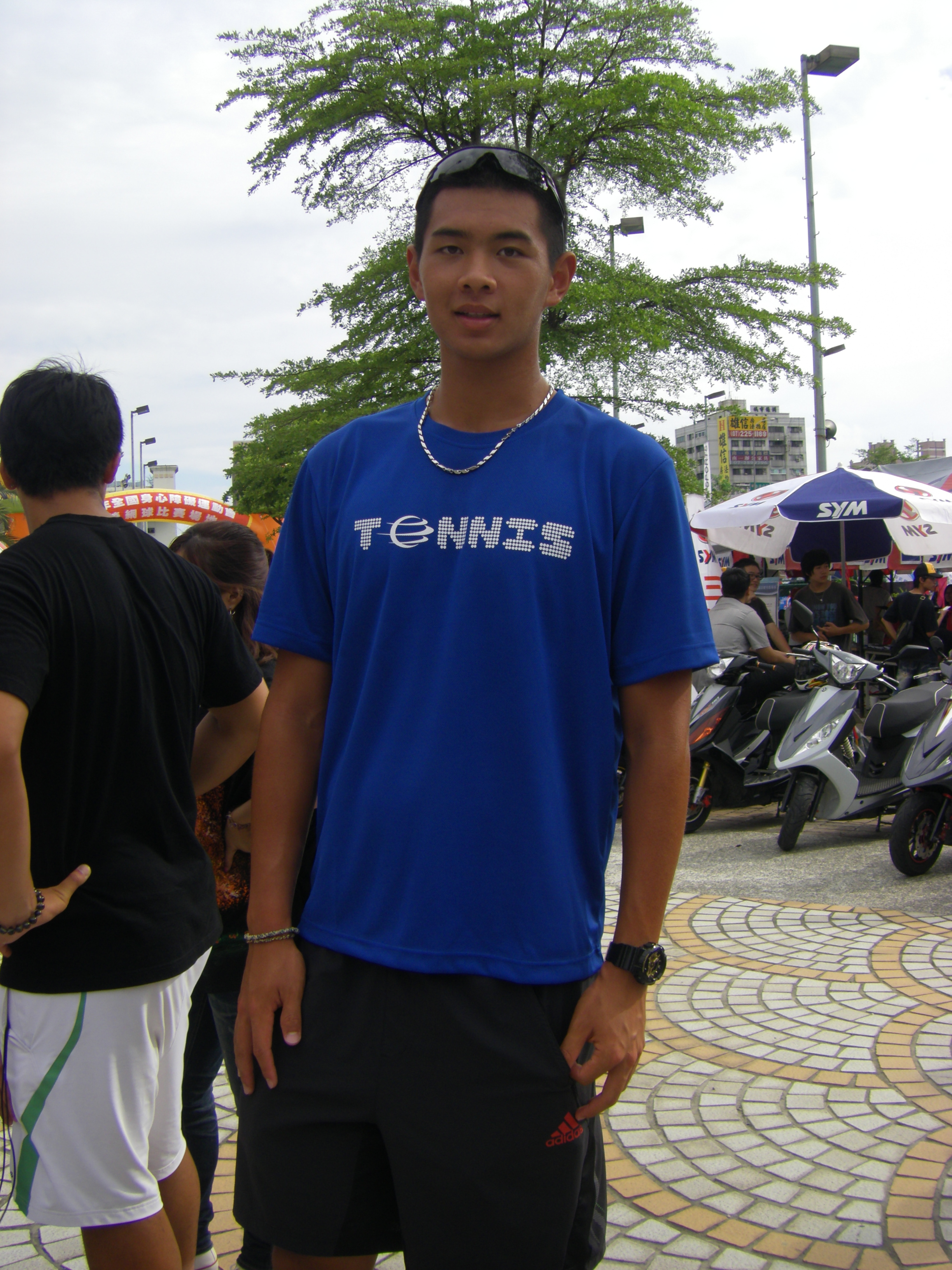
- Country (sports): Chinese Taipei
- Born: 11 September 1993 (age 32) Taiwan
- Plays: Right Handed
- Prize money: $33,582

Singles
- Career record: 2–12
- Career titles: 0
- Highest ranking: No. 744 (23 April 2012)
- Current ranking: No. 996

Doubles
- Career record: 7–9
- Career titles: 0
- Highest ranking: No. 381 (4 May 2015)
- Current ranking: No. 381
- Last updated on: September 12, 2016.

Wang Chieh-fu
Medal record

Representing Chinese Taipei

Men's Tennis

Summer Universiade
Silver medal – second place	2013 Kazan	Men's Team

Wang Chieh-fu
- Traditional Chinese: 王介甫
- Simplified Chinese: 王介甫
Transcriptions
Standard Mandarin
- Hanyu Pinyin: Wáng Jièfǔ

Wang Chieh-fu (Chinese: 王介甫; born 11 September 1993) is a Taiwanese tennis player playing on the ATP Challenger Tour. On 23 April 2012, he reached his highest ATP singles ranking of 744 and his highest doubles ranking of 381 achieved on 4 May 2015.

== Tour titles ==
Legend
Grand Slam (0)
ATP Masters Series (0)
ATP Tour (0)
Challengers (1)

=== Doubles ===
Outcome	No.	Date	Tournament	Surface	Partner	Opponents	Score
Runner-up	1.	22 September 2013	Kaohsiung	Hard	(India) Yuki Bhambri	(Colombia) Juan Sebastián Cabal (Colombia) Robert Farah	4–6, 2–6
Winner	2.	3 May 2015	Taipei City	Synthetic	(Australia) Matthew Ebden	(Thailand) Sanchai Ratiwatana (Thailand) Sonchat Ratiwatana	6–1, 6–4
