= Yang Tsung-hua =

Taiwanese tennis player (born 1991)

Yang Tsung-hua 楊宗樺
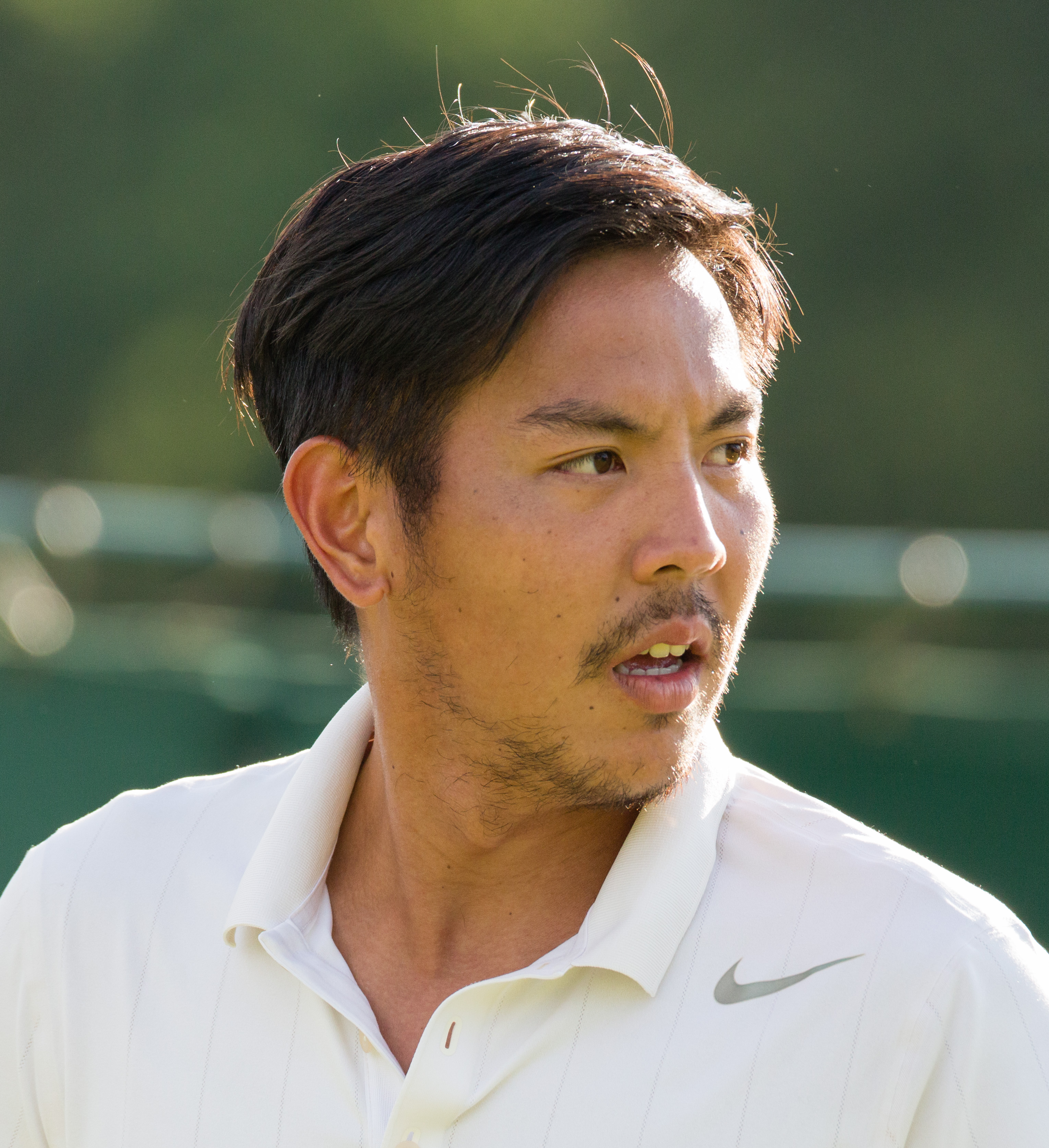
- Country (sports): Chinese Taipei
- Residence: Taiwan
- Born: 29 March 1991 (age 35) Hsinchu, Taiwan
- Height: 1.78 m (5 ft 10 in)
- Turned pro: 2006
- Plays: Right-handed (two-handed backhand)
- Prize money: $525,595

Singles
- Career record: 7–19
- Career titles: 0
- Highest ranking: No. 164 (14 May 2012)

Grand Slam singles results
- Australian Open: Q3 (2014)
- French Open: Q2 (2009)
- Wimbledon: Q1 (2012, 2013, 2015, 2018)
- US Open: Q3 (2012)

Doubles
- Career record: 4–9
- Career titles: 0
- Highest ranking: No. 127 (15 July 2019)

Grand Slam doubles results
- Australian Open: 1R (2016, 2017)
Medal record
Tennis
Representing Chinese Taipei
Asian Games
Gold medal – first place	2010 Guangzhou	Team
Gold medal – first place	2010 Guangzhou	Mixed doubles
Universiade
Silver medal – second place	2015 Gwangju	Team
Bronze medal – third place	2015 Gwangju	Singles
- Last updated on: 17 March 2024.

Yang Tsung-hua
- Traditional Chinese: 楊宗樺
- Simplified Chinese: 杨宗桦
Transcriptions
Standard Mandarin
- Hanyu Pinyin: Yáng Zōnghuà

Yang Tsung-hua (Chinese: 楊宗樺; born 29 March 1991) is a Taiwanese professional tennis player. On the junior circuit, Yang reached a career-high combined ranking of No. 1 in 2008, when he won the French Open singles title against Polish player Jerzy Janowicz in two sets, and the Australian Open and Wimbledon doubles titles alongside Hsieh Cheng-peng.

== Career ==
=== Juniors ===
Yang was named International Tennis Federation (ITF) Junior World Champion for the 2008 season by the ITF.

As a junior, he compiled a 66–23 win–loss record in singles (and 61–16 in doubles), achieving his combined ranking of No. 1 in the world in July 2008.

He reached 4 Junior Grand Slam finals in 2008, winning 3 titles. He started by losing the 2008 Australian Open – Boys' singles final, then rebounded to win the 2008 Australian Open – Boys' doubles, the 2008 French Open – Boys' singles and the 2008 Wimbledon Boys' Doubles titles.

=== Pro tour ===
Yang competes today on the ATP Challenger Tour and the ATP World Tour, both in singles and doubles. He reached his highest ATP singles ranking, No. 164, on 14 May 2012, and his highest ATP doubles ranking, No. 127, on 15 July 2019. Yang is coached by Lhen Man.

In the 2012 US Open, Yang reached the third qualifying round, where he lost to Teymuraz Gabashvili. Later he qualified into the ATP Bangkok, where he lost in the first round to Grigor Dimitrov.

In 2013, he defeated Tatsuma Ito to reach semifinals of the An-Ning Challenger, where he lost to James Ward. At Kun-Ming he also reached semifinals after winning over Yuichi Sugita and Wu Di.

Yang defeated Marius Copil to reach third round of qualifying of the 2014 Australian Open, after which he lost to Dušan Lajović. At the Maui Challenger, he reached the final which he lost to Bradley Klahn. At the Liberec Challenger, he beat world No. 40 Pablo Cuevas and Norbert Gombos to reach the semifinals, where he was defeated by Horacio Zeballos.

== Challenger and Futures finals ==
=== Singles: 24 (11–13) ===
Legend ATP Challenger Tour (0–3) ITF Futures Tour (11–10)	Finals by surface Hard (4–11) Clay (7–2)

Result	W–L	Date	Tournament	Tier	Surface	Opponent	Score
Win	1–0	Jan 2009	China F1, Guangzhou	Futures	Hard	(China) Zeng Shaoxuan	6–3, 5–7, 6–4
Loss	1–1	Jun 2009	Malaysia F2, Petaling Jaya	Futures	Hard	(Italy) Luigi d'Agord	2–6, 2–6
Loss	1–2	Jul 2009	Korean Rep. F5, Gyeongsan	Futures	Hard	(Chinese Taipei) Chen Ti	2–6, 2–6
Loss	1–3	Jul 2009	Korean Rep. F6, Gyeongsan	Futures	Hard	(South Korea) Kim Young-jun	4–6, 1–6
Loss	1–4	Oct 2009	Japan F8, Kashiwa	Futures	Hard	(Japan) Junn Mitsuhashi	1–6, 6–7^{(4–7)}
Win	2–4	Jun 2010	Malaysia F1, Kuala Lumpur	Futures	Hard	(South Korea) Kim Young-jun	6–2, 6–2
Win	3–4	Jul 2011	Chinese Taipei F1, Taipei	Futures	Hard	(Japan) Junn Mitsuhashi	6–0, 6–3
Loss	3–5	Aug 2011	Beijing, China, P.R.	Challenger	Hard	(Uzbekistan) Farrukh Dustov	1–6, 6–7^{(4–7)}
Loss	3–6	Jan 2014	Maui, USA	Challenger	Hard	(United States) Bradley Klahn	2–6, 3–6
Loss	3–7	Jun 2014	China F7, Putian	Futures	Hard	(Chinese Taipei) Huang Liang-chi	5–7, 3–6
Win	4–7	Apr 2015	China F1, Anning	Futures	Clay	(Netherlands) Boy Westerhof	7–6^{(7–3)}, 6–4
Win	5–7	Apr 2015	China F2, Anning	Futures	Clay	(South Korea) Kim Young-seok	6–0, 7–5
Loss	5–8	Apr 2015	China F3, Anning	Futures	Clay	(Chinese Taipei) Huang Liang-chi	3–6, 2–6
Win	6–8	Aug 2015	Chinese Taipei F1, Kaohsiung	Futures	Hard	(China) Bai Yan	4–6, 6–4, 1–0 ret.
Loss	6–9	Aug 2015	Chinese Taipei F2, Kaohsiung	Futures	Hard	(China) Bai Yan	3–6, 4–6
Win	7–9	Feb 2017	China F2, Anning	Futures	Clay	(New Zealand) Jose Statham	2–6, 6–4, 7–6^{(9–7)}
Win	8–9	Aug 2017	Macedonia F2, Skopje	Futures	Clay	(Croatia) Nino Serdarušić	7–6^{(7–2)}, 4–6, 6–3
Win	9–9	Aug 2017	Turkey F29, Mersin	Futures	Clay	(France) Thomas Bréchemier	6–1, 6–0
Loss	9–10	Aug 2017	Turkey F30, Istanbul	Futures	Clay	(Italy) Alessandro Bega	6–7^{(3–7)}, 6–3, 5–7
Loss	9–11	Sep 2017	Gwangju, Korea, Rep.	Challenger	Hard	(Germany) Matthias Bachinger	3–6, 4–6
Win	10–11	Jan 2018	China F2, Anning	Futures	Clay	(Canada) Steven Diez	6–3, 3–6, 7–6^{(7–4)}
Win	11–11	Jan 2018	China F3, Anning	Futures	Clay	(Chinese Taipei) Lee Kuan-yi	6–4, 6–7^{(5–7)}, 6–1
Loss	11–12	Jul 2019	M25 Kunshan, China	World Tennis Tour	Hard	(China) Fajing Sun	2–6, 2–6
Loss	11–13	Jul 2019	M25 Taipei, Taiwan	World Tennis Tour	Hard	(Japan) Renta Tokuda	2–6, 6–2, 0-6

=== Doubles: 45 (25–20) ===
Legend ATP Challenger Tour (12–8) ITF Futures Tour (13–12)	Finals by surface Hard (22–13) Clay (2–5) Carpet (1–2)

Result	W–L	Date	Tournament	Tier	Surface	Partner	Opponents	Score
Loss	0–1	Sep 2006	Japan F9, Osaka	Futures	Carpet	(Chinese Taipei) Lee Hsin-han	(Japan) Yaoki Ishii (Japan) Hiroki Kondo	4–6, 3–6
Loss	0–2	Jun 2007	India F5, Delhi	Futures	Hard	(Chinese Taipei) Lee Hsin-han	(India) Tushar Liberhan (India) Sanam Singh	4–6, 5–7
Win	1–2	Jun 2007	China F4, Guangzhou	Futures	Hard	(Chinese Taipei) Lee Hsin-han	(China) Yu Xinyuan (China) Zeng Shaoxuan	6–4, 2–6, 7–6^{(7–5)}
Loss	1–3	Aug 2007	Indonesia F2, Semarang	Futures	Hard	(Chinese Taipei) Peng Hsien-yin	(Japan) Hiroki Kondo (Japan) Takahiro Terachi	6–3, 6–7^{(5–7)}, 3–6
Win	2–3	Oct 2008	Japan F10, Kashiwa	Futures	Hard	(Chinese Taipei) Yi Chu-huan	(Chinese Taipei) Huang Chin-yu (Chinese Taipei) Peng Hsien-yin	6–1, 6–2
Loss	2–4	Oct 2008	Japan F11, Tokyo	Futures	Hard	(Chinese Taipei) Yi Chu-huan	(Japan) Yaoki Ishii (Japan) Hiroki Kondo	4–6, 2–6
Loss	2–5	Nov 2008	Cancún, Mexico	Challenger	Clay	(Chinese Taipei) Lee Hsin-han	(Poland) Łukasz Kubot (Austria) Oliver Marach	5–7, 2–6
Win	3–5	Jan 2009	China F1, Guangzhou	Futures	Hard	(Chinese Taipei) Lee Hsin-han	(China) Li Zhe (China) Wang Yu jr.	6–0, 6–3
Win	4–5	Apr 2009	Japan F3, Kōfu	Futures	Hard	(Chinese Taipei) Yi Chu-huan	(Japan) Yuya Kibi (Japan) Tomohiro Shinokawa	6–1, 6–0
Loss	4–6	Jun 2009	Malaysia F1, Kuala Lumpur	Futures	Hard	(Chinese Taipei) Lee Hsin-han	(Spain) Arnau Brugués Davi (Italy) Luigi d'Agord	6–7^{(4–7)}, 4–6
Win	5–6	Jul 2009	Malaysia F3, Kuala Lumpur	Futures	Hard	(China) Yu Xinyuan	(Pakistan) Aqeel Khan (Malaysia) Si Yew Ming	7–6^{(7–4)}, 6–3
Win	6–6	Jul 2009	Korean Rep. F5, Gyeongsan	Futures	Hard	(Chinese Taipei) Chen Ti	(Japan) Satoshi Iwabuchi (Japan) Gouichi Motomura	7–6^{(7–4)}, 6–4
Win	7–6	Jul 2009	Korean Rep. F6, Gyeongsan	Futures	Hard	(Chinese Taipei) Lee Hsin-han	(Chinese Taipei) Chen Ti (Japan) Satoshi Iwabuchi	7–6^{(7–4)}, 5–7, [10–8]
Win	8–6	Aug 2009	Almaty, Kazakhstan	Challenger	Hard	(Ukraine) Denys Molchanov	(Canada) Pierre-Ludovic Duclos (Kazakhstan) Alexey Kedryuk	4–6, 7–6^{(7–5)}, [11–9]
Win	9–6	Sep 2009	Thailand F3, Nonthaburi	Futures	Hard	(Chinese Taipei) Lee Hsin-han	(Indonesia) Nesa Arta (Indonesia) Christopher Rungkat	7–6^{(7–4)}, 6–4
Loss	9–7	Oct 2009	Japan F8, Kashiwa	Futures	Hard	(Chinese Taipei) Lee Hsin-han	(Japan) Junn Mitsuhashi (Chinese Taipei) Yi Chu-huan	4–6, 2–6
Loss	9–8	Nov 2009	Chuncheon, Korea, Rep.	Challenger	Hard	(Chinese Taipei) Lee Hsin-han	(Latvia) Andis Juška (Russia) Dmitri Sitak	6–3, 3–6, [2–10]
Win	10–8	Nov 2009	Yokohama, Japan	Challenger	Hard	(Chinese Taipei) Yi Chu-huan	(Kazakhstan) Alexey Kedryuk (Japan) Junn Mitsuhashi	6–7^{(9–11)}, 6–3, [12–10]
Loss	10–9	Mar 2010	China F1, Kaiyuan	Futures	Hard	(Chinese Taipei) Lee Hsin-han	(Australia) Sadik Kadir (India) Purav Raja	6–4, 3–6, [9–11]
Loss	10–10	Mar 2010	China F2, Mengzi	Futures	Hard	(Chinese Taipei) Lee Hsin-han	(Solomon Islands) Michael Leong (Germany) Sebastian Rieschick	2–6, 5–7
Loss	10–11	May 2010	Busan, Korea, Rep.	Challenger	Hard	(Canada) Pierre-Ludovic Duclos	(Australia) Rameez Junaid (Austria) Alexander Peya	4–6, 5–7
Win	11–11	Jun 2010	Malaysia F1, Kuala Lumpur	Futures	Hard	(Chinese Taipei) Yi Chu-huan	(Australia) Kaden Hensel (Australia) Dane Propoggia	6–3, 6–3
Loss	11–12	Aug 2010	Samarkand, Uzbekistan	Challenger	Clay	(Chinese Taipei) Lee Hsin-han	(Latvia) Andis Juška (Latvia) Deniss Pavlovs	5–7, 3–6
Win	12–12	Jul 2011	Wuhai, China, P.R.	Challenger	Hard	(Chinese Taipei) Lee Hsin-han	(China) Feng He (China) Zhang Ze	6–2, 7–6^{(7–4)}
Win	13–12	May 2013	Busan, Korea, Rep.	Challenger	Hard	(Chinese Taipei) Peng Hsien-yin	(South Korea) Jeong Suk-young (South Korea) Lim Yong-kyu	6–4, 6–3
Loss	13–13	Jun 2014	China F6, Putian	Futures	Hard	(Chinese Taipei) Peng Hsien-yin	(China) Gong Maoxin (China) Li Zhe	1–6, 3–6
Win	14–13	Jun 2014	China F7, Putian	Futures	Hard	(Chinese Taipei) Peng Hsien-yin	(Chinese Taipei) Huang Liang-chi (United States) Nicolas Meister	1–6, 6–1, [15–13]
Loss	14–14	Aug 2014	Chinese Taipei F2, Kaohsiung	Futures	Hard	(Japan) Arata Onozawa	(Chinese Taipei) Wang Chieh-fu (Chinese Taipei) Yi Chu-huan	3–6, 2–6
Loss	14–15	Nov 2014	Toyota, Japan	Challenger	Carpet (i)	(Japan) Bumpei Sato	(Japan) Toshihide Matsui (Japan) Yasutaka Uchiyama	6–7^{(6–8)}, 2–6
Loss	14–16	Apr 2015	China F1, Anning	Futures	Clay	(China) Bai Yan	(Chinese Taipei) Huang Liang-chi (Spain) Enrique López Pérez	3–6, 6–4, [7–10]
Win	15–16	Aug 2015	China F12, Fuzhou	Futures	Hard	(Chinese Taipei) Hsieh Cheng-peng	(Japan) Yuya Kibi (Japan) Arata Onozawa	6–3, 7–5
Win	16–16	Aug 2015	Chinese Taipei F1, Kaohsiung	Futures	Hard	(Chinese Taipei) Hsieh Cheng-peng	(China) Bai Yan (Chinese Taipei) Yi Chu-huan	6–4, 7–6^{(7–5)}
Win	17–16	Sep 2015	Kaohsiung, Chinese Taipei	Challenger	Hard	(Chinese Taipei) Hsieh Cheng-peng	(China) Gong Maoxin (Chinese Taipei) Peng Hsien-yin	6–2, 6–2
Win	18–16	May 2016	Taipei, Chinese Taipei	Challenger	Carpet (i)	(Chinese Taipei) Hsieh Cheng-peng	(Denmark) Frederik Nielsen (Republic of Ireland) David O'Hare	7–6^{(8–6)}, 6–4
Loss	18–17	May 2016	Samarkand, Uzbekistan	Challenger	Clay	(Chinese Taipei) Hsieh Cheng-peng	(Russia) Denis Matsukevitch (Belarus) Andrei Vasilevski	4–6, 7–5, [5–10]
Win	19–17	Jul 2016	Gimcheon, Korea, Rep.	Challenger	Hard	(Chinese Taipei) Hsieh Cheng-peng	(Colombia) Nicolás Barrientos (Philippines) Ruben Gonzales	w/o
Loss	19–18	Jul 2017	Macedonia F1, Skopje	Futures	Clay	(Australia) Dane Propoggia	(Austria) Maximilian Neuchrist (Austria) David Pichler	6–7^{(1–7)}, 3–6
Win	20–18	Aug 2017	Macedonia F2, Skopje	Futures	Clay	(Australia) Dane Propoggia	(Australia) Nicholas Horton (Bosnia and Herzegovina) Aziz Kijametović	3–6, 6–4, [10–2]
Win	21–18	Aug 2018	Jinan, China, P.R.	Challenger	Hard	(Chinese Taipei) Hsieh Cheng-peng	(Kazakhstan) Alexander Bublik (Russia) Alexander Pavlioutchenkov	7–6^{(7–5)}, 4–6, [10–5]
Win	22–18	Sep 2018	Kaohsiung, Chinese Taipei	Challenger	Hard (i)	(Chinese Taipei) Hsieh Cheng-peng	(Chinese Taipei) Hsu Yu-hsiou (Chinese Taipei) Jimmy Wang	6–7^{(3–7)}, 6–2, [10–8]
Loss	22–19	Nov 2018	Pune, India	Challenger	Hard	(Chinese Taipei) Hsieh Cheng-peng	(India) Vijay Sundar Prashanth (India) Ramkumar Ramanathan	6–7^{(3–7)}, 7–6^{(7–5)}, [7–10]
Win	23–19	Jun 2019	Shymkent, Kazakhstan	Challenger	Clay	(Serbia) Nikola Čačić	(Sweden) André Göransson (Switzerland) Marc-Andrea Hüsler	6–4, 6–4
Loss	23–20	Jun 2019	Fergana, Uzbekistan	Challenger	Hard	(Serbia) Nikola Čačić	(United States) Evan King (United States) Hunter Reese	3–6, 7–5, [4–10]
Win	24–20	Sep 2019	Kaohsiung, Chinese Taipei	Challenger	Hard	(Chinese Taipei) Hsieh Cheng-peng	(United States) Evan King (United States) Hunter Reese	6–4, 7–6^{(7–4)}
Win	25–20	Nov 2019	Shenzhen, China, P.R.	Challenger	Hard	(Chinese Taipei) Hsieh Cheng-peng	(Russia) Mikhail Elgin (India) Ramkumar Ramanathan	6–2, 7–5

=== Junior Grand Slam finals ===
==== Singles: 2 (1 title, 1 runner-up) ====
Result	Year	Tournament	Surface	Opponent	Score
Loss	2008	Australian Open	Hard	(Australia) Bernard Tomic	6–4, 6–7^{(5-7)}, 0-6
Win	2008	French Open	Clay	(Poland) Jerzy Janowicz	6–3, 7–6^{(7–5)}

==== Doubles: 2 (2 titles) ====
Result	Year	Tournament	Surface	Partner	Opponents	Score
Win	2008	Australian Open	Hard	(Chinese Taipei) Hsieh Cheng-peng	(Canada) Vasek Pospisil (Mexico) Cesar Ramirez	3–6, 7–5, [10-5]
Win	2008	Wimbledon	Grass	(Chinese Taipei) Hsieh Cheng-peng	(Australia) Bernard Tomic (Australia) Matt Reid	6–4, 2–6, [12-10]

== Singles performance timeline ==
Key
W	F	SF	QF	#R	RR	Q#	P#	DNQ	A	Z#	PO	G	S	B	NMS	NTI	P	NH

(W) winner; (F) finalist; (SF) semifinalist; (QF) quarterfinalist; (#R) rounds 4, 3, 2, 1; (RR) round-robin stage; (Q#) qualification round; (P#) preliminary round; (DNQ) did not qualify; (A) absent; (Z#) Davis/Fed Cup Zonal Group (with number indication) or (PO) play-off; (G) gold, (S) silver or (B) bronze Olympic/Paralympic medal; (NMS) not a Masters tournament; (NTI) not a Tier I tournament; (P) postponed; (NH) not held; (SR) strike rate (events won / competed); (W–L) win–loss record.
To avoid confusion and double counting, these charts are updated at the conclusion of a tournament or when the player's participation has ended.

Current through the end of 2021 Acapulco.

Tournament	2009	2010	2011	2012	2013	2014	2015	2016	2017	2018	2019	2020	2021	SR	W–L
Grand Slam tournaments
Australian Open	A	A	A	Q1	Q2	Q3	Q1	Q1	A	A	A	A	A	0 / 0	0–0
French Open	Q2	A	A	Q1	A	Q1	A	A	A	A	A	A	A	0 / 0	0–0
Wimbledon	A	A	A	Q1	Q1	A	Q1	A	A	Q1	A	NH		0 / 0	0–0
US Open	A	A	Q2	Q3	A	A	A	A	A	A	A	A		0 / 0	0–0
Win–loss	0–0	0–0	0–0	0–0	0–0	0–0	0–0	0–0	0–0	0–0	0–0	0–0	0–0	0 / 0	0–0
ATP World Tour Masters 1000
Shanghai Masters	Q1	1R	Q1	A	A	A	A	A	A	A	A	NH		0 / 1	0–1

Awards
Preceded by (Lithuania) Ričardas Berankis	ITF Junior World Champion; 2008	Succeeded by (Sweden) Daniel Berta
