= 2015 Ningbo Challenger – Doubles =

Doubles
- 2015 Ningbo Challenger

Final
- Champions: (Israel) Dudi Sela (Israel) Amir Weintraub
- Runners-up: (Croatia) Nikola Mektić (Croatia) Franko Škugor
- Score: 6–3, 3–6, [10–6]

Events
| Singles | Doubles |
| ← 2012 · | Ningbo Challenger | · 2016 → |

This was the first edition of the tournament for since 2012, Dudi Sela and Amir Weintraub won the title defeating Nikola Mektić and Franko Škugor in the final 6–3, 3–6, [10–6].

== Seeds ==
1. (China) Gong Maoxin / (Ukraine) Denys Molchanov (first round)
2. (Italy) Flavio Cipolla / (France) Tristan Lamasine (first round)
3. (Thailand) Sonchat Ratiwatana / (Thailand) Sanchai Ratiwatana (quarterfinals)
4. (China) Bai Yan / (Italy) Riccardo Ghedin (quarterfinals)

== Draw ==
=== Key ===
- Q = Qualifier
- WC = Wild card
- LL = Lucky loser
- Alt = Alternate
- SE = Special exempt
- PR = Protected ranking
- ITF = ITF entry
- JE = Junior exempt
- w/o = Walkover
- r = Retired
- d = Defaulted
- SR = Special ranking

First round
1 | (China) M Gong (Ukraine) D Molchanov | 3 | 4
(Belarus) U Ignatik (Japan) Y Nishioka | 6 | 6
WC | (China) Long Chen (China) F Sun | 6 | 3 | [6]
(Croatia) M Pecotić (South Africa) T Vorster | 2 | 6 | [10]
3 | (Thailand) So Ratiwatana (Thailand) Sa Ratiwatana | 6 | 6
(France) Laurent Rochette (Japan) G Soeda | 0 | 2
(Israel) D Sela (Israel) A Weintraub | 6 | 4 | [10]
WC | (China) D Wu (China) Z Zhang | 4 | 6 | [7]
(Germany) P Gojowczyk (Germany) N Langer | 5 | 5
(Italy) T Fabbiano (Estonia) J Zopp | 7 | 7
WC | (China) Y He (China) Zhuoyang Qiu | 4 | 3
4 | (China) Y Bai (Italy) R Ghedin | 6 | 6
(Japan) T Matsui (Japan) H Moriya | 3 | 2
(Croatia) N Mektić (Croatia) F Škugor | 6 | 6
(Chinese Taipei) C-p Hsieh (China) Z Zhang | 6 | 6
2 | (Italy) F Cipolla (France) T Lamasine | 2 | 3

Quarterfinals
(Belarus) U Ignatik (Japan) Y Nishioka | 7 | 0 | [10]
(Croatia) M Pecotić (South Africa) T Vorster | 5 | 6 | [8]
3 | (Thailand) So Ratiwatana (Thailand) Sa Ratiwatana | 6 | 4 | [5]
(Israel) D Sela (Israel) A Weintraub | 4 | 6 | [10]
(Italy) T Fabbiano (Estonia) J Zopp | 6 | 6
4 | (China) Y Bai (Italy) R Ghedin | 2 | 4
(Croatia) N Mektić (Croatia) F Škugor | 1 | 6 | [10]
(Chinese Taipei) C-p Hsieh (China) Z Zhang | 6 | 3 | [8]

Semifinals
(Belarus) U Ignatik (Japan) Y Nishioka | 3 | 2
(Israel) D Sela (Israel) A Weintraub | 6 | 6
(Italy) T Fabbiano (Estonia) J Zopp | 3 | 2
(Croatia) N Mektić (Croatia) F Škugor | 6 | 6

Final
(Israel) D Sela (Israel) A Weintraub | 6 | 3 | [10]
(Croatia) N Mektić (Croatia) F Škugor | 3 | 6 | [6]
