= 2018 Ningbo Challenger =

- Date: 15–21 October
- Edition: 6th
- Surface: Hard
- Location: Ningbo, China

Champions

Singles
- (Italy) Thomas Fabbiano

Doubles
- (China) Gong Maoxin / (China) Zhang Ze
← 2017 ·	Ningbo Challenger	· 2019 →

The 2018 Ningbo Challenger was a professional tennis tournament played on hard courts. It was the sixth edition of the tournament and part of the 2018 ATP Challenger Tour. It took place in Ningbo, China.

== Singles entrants ==
=== Seeds ===
Country	Player	Rank^{1}	Seed
POL	Hubert Hurkacz	93	1
MDA	Radu Albot	100	2
ITA	Thomas Fabbiano	122	3
IND	Ramkumar Ramanathan	127	4
SRB	Miomir Kecmanović	162	5
ESP	Enrique López Pérez	168	6
IND	Prajnesh Gunneswaran	169	7
JPN	Tatsuma Ito	173	8

- ^{1} Rankings are as of 8 October 2018.

=== Other entrants ===
The following players received wildcards into the singles main draw:

- (China) He Yecong
- (China) Te Rigele
- (China) Wu Yibing
- (China) Xia Zihao

The following players received entry from the qualifying draw:

- (Norway) Viktor Durasovic
- (India) Saketh Myneni
- (China) Sun Fajing
- (Japan) Yusuke Takahashi

== Champions ==
=== Singles ===
- (Italy) Thomas Fabbiano def. (India) Prajnesh Gunneswaran 7–6^{(7–4)}, 4–6, 6–3.

=== Doubles ===
- (China) Gong Maoxin / (China) Zhang Ze def. (Chinese Taipei) Hsieh Cheng-peng / (Indonesia) Christopher Rungkat 7–5, 2–6, [10–5].
