= 2019 Ningbo Challenger – Doubles =

Doubles
- 2019 Ningbo Challenger

Final
- Champions: (Australia) Andrew Harris (Australia) Marc Polmans
- Runners-up: (Australia) Alex Bolt (Australia) Matt Reid
- Score: 6–0, 6–1

Events
Singles	Doubles
- Ningbo Challenger

Gong Maoxin and Zhang Ze were the defending champions but lost in the first round to Nam Ji-sung and Song Min-kyu.

Andrew Harris and Marc Polmans won the title after defeating Alex Bolt and Matt Reid 6–0, 6–1 in the final.

== Seeds ==
1. (China) Gong Maoxin / (China) Zhang Ze (first round)
2. (Chinese Taipei) Hsieh Cheng-peng / (Chinese Taipei) Yang Tsung-hua (first round)
3. (India) Jeevan Nedunchezhiyan / (Canada) Adil Shamasdin (first round)
4. (China) Li Zhe / (Portugal) Gonçalo Oliveira (semifinals)

== Draw ==
Key

- Q = Qualifier
- WC = Wild card
- LL = Lucky loser
- Alt = Alternate
- ITF = ITF entry
- PR = Protected ranking
- SR = Special ranking
- SE = Special exempt
- JE = Junior exempt
- JR = Junior Accelerator Programme entrant
- CO = College Accelerator Programme entrant
- NG = Next Gen Accelerator Program entrant
- w/o = Walkover
- r = Retired
- d = Defaulted

First round
1	(China) M Gong (China) Ze Zhang	7^{7}	3	[9]
(South Korea) J-s Nam (South Korea) M-k Song	6^{4}	6	[11]
(Japan) T Matsui (Japan) G Soeda	3	2
(Canada) S Diez (France) F Reboul	6	6
3	(India) J Nedunchezhiyan (Canada) A Shamasdin	3	1
(Australia) A Bolt (Australia) M Reid	6	6
WC	(China) A Wang (China) Wu Hao	5	6	[5]
WC	(China) Y He (China) D Wu	7	4	[10]
(India) P Gunneswaran (India) V Vardhan	6^{3}	1
(Spain) A Davidovich Fokina (Spain) E López Pérez	7^{7}	6
(Chinese Taipei) J Jung (Indonesia) C Rungkat	6^{5}	6	[4]
4	(China) Z Li (Portugal) G Oliveira	7^{7}	2	[10]
(Australia) A Harris (Australia) M Polmans	6	6^{4}	[10]
WC	(China) X Gao (China) F Sun	4	7^{7}	[8]
(Australia) M Purcell (Australia) A Santillan	2	6	[10]
2	(Chinese Taipei) C-p Hsieh (Chinese Taipei) T-h Yang	6	3	[7]

Quarterfinals
(South Korea) J-s Nam (South Korea) M-k Song	7^{7}	6
(Canada) S Diez (France) F Reboul	6^{4}	0
(Australia) A Bolt (Australia) M Reid	6	6
WC	(China) Y He (China) D Wu	4	2
(Spain) A Davidovich Fokina (Spain) E López Pérez	4	5
4	(China) Z Li (Portugal) G Oliveira	6	7
(Australia) A Harris (Australia) M Polmans	6	7^{7}
(Australia) M Purcell (Australia) A Santillan	2	6^{2}

Semifinals
(South Korea) J-s Nam (South Korea) M-k Song	6	4	[4]
(Australia) A Bolt (Australia) M Reid	3	6	[10]
4	(China) Z Li (Portugal) G Oliveira	4	3
(Australia) A Harris (Australia) M Polmans	6	6

Final
(Australia) A Bolt (Australia) M Reid	0	1
(Australia) A Harris (Australia) M Polmans	6	6
