= 2017 Ningbo Challenger – Doubles =

Doubles
- 2017 Ningbo Challenger

Final
- Champions: (Moldova) Radu Albot (New Zealand) Jose Statham
- Runners-up: (India) Jeevan Nedunchezhiyan (Indonesia) Christopher Rungkat
- Score: 7–5, 6–3

Events
Singles	Doubles
← 2016 ·	Ningbo Challenger	· 2018 →

Jonathan Eysseric and Sergiy Stakhovsky were the defending champions but chose not to defend their title.

Radu Albot and Jose Statham won the title after defeating Jeevan Nedunchezhiyan and Christopher Rungkat 7–5, 6–3 in the final.

== Seeds ==
1. (India) Jeevan Nedunchezhiyan / (Indonesia) Christopher Rungkat (final)
2. (Japan) Toshihide Matsui / (India) Vishnu Vardhan (first round)
3. (Chile) Nicolás Jarry / (Canada) Peter Polansky (first round)
4. (China) Gong Maoxin / (China) Zhang Ze (first round)

== Draw ==
=== Key ===
- Q = Qualifier
- WC = Wild card
- LL = Lucky loser
- Alt = Alternate
- SE = Special exempt
- PR = Protected ranking
- ITF = ITF entry
- JE = Junior exempt
- w/o = Walkover
- r = Retired
- d = Defaulted
- SR = Special ranking

First round
1	(India) J Nedunchezhiyan (Indonesia) C Rungkat	6	6
(Japan) Shuichi Sekiguchi (Japan) G Soeda	3	2
WC	(China) D Wu (China) Y Wu	6	5	[10]
WC	(China) Y Bai (China) Z Li	2	7	[3]
4	(China) M Gong (China) Ze Zhang	6	3	[8]
(Chinese Taipei) H-y Peng (Chinese Taipei) T-h Yang	4	6	[10]
(Japan) T Daniel (Japan) T Ito	2	7^{7}	[5]
(Italy) R Ghedin (India) S Nagal	6	6^{3}	[10]
(Moldova) R Albot (New Zealand) J Statham	7^{8}	4	[10]
(United States) T Fritz (Australia) A Santillan	6^{6}	6	[1]
(Japan) H Moriya (Japan) Y Takahashi	6	7
3	(Chile) N Jarry (Canada) P Polansky	2	5
(Spain) A Menéndez Maceiras (Brazil) T Monteiro	6	7^{7}
WC	(China) X Gao (China) Zh Zhang	1	6^{5}
(France) S Doumbia (France) C Hemery	6	6
2	(Japan) T Matsui (India) V Vardhan	2	3

Quarterfinals
1	(India) J Nedunchezhiyan (Indonesia) C Rungkat	2	6	[10]
WC	(China) D Wu (China) Y Wu	6	2	[7]
(Chinese Taipei) H-y Peng (Chinese Taipei) T-h Yang	6^{4}	6^{8}
(Italy) R Ghedin (India) S Nagal	7^{7}	7^{10}
(Moldova) R Albot (New Zealand) J Statham	6	6
(Japan) H Moriya (Japan) Y Takahashi	3	4
(Spain) A Menéndez Maceiras (Brazil) T Monteiro	7^{7}	6
(France) S Doumbia (France) C Hemery	6^{4}	4

Semifinals
1	(India) J Nedunchezhiyan (Indonesia) C Rungkat	6	6
(Italy) R Ghedin (India) S Nagal	1	0
(Moldova) R Albot (New Zealand) J Statham	6	6
(Spain) A Menéndez Maceiras (Brazil) T Monteiro	2	4

Final
1	(India) J Nedunchezhiyan (Indonesia) C Rungkat	5	3
(Moldova) R Albot (New Zealand) J Statham	7	6
