= 2015 Ningbo Challenger – Singles =

Singles
- 2015 Ningbo Challenger

Final
- Champion: (Chinese Taipei) Lu Yen-hsun
- Runner-up: (Estonia) Jürgen Zopp
- Score: 7–6^{(7–3)}, 6–1

Events
Singles	Doubles
← 2012 ·	Ningbo Challenger	· 2016 →

This was the first edition of the tournament for since 2012, Lu Yen-hsun won the title defeating Jürgen Zopp in the final 7–6^{(7–3)}, 6–1.

== Seeds ==
1. (Chinese Taipei) Lu Yen-hsun (champion)
2. (Australia) James Duckworth (quarterfinals)
3. (Israel) Dudi Sela (first round)
4. (Japan) Go Soeda (first round)
5. (Japan) Yoshihito Nishioka (first round)
6. (Estonia) Jürgen Zopp (final)
7. (Germany) Peter Gojowczyk (semifinals)
8. (Italy) Thomas Fabbiano (quarterfinals)

== Draw ==
=== Key ===
- Q = Qualifier
- WC = Wild card
- LL = Lucky loser
- Alt = Alternate
- SE = Special exempt
- PR = Protected ranking
- ITF = ITF entry
- JE = Junior exempt
- w/o = Walkover
- r = Retired
- d = Defaulted
- SR = Special ranking

=== Finals ===
Semifinals
1	(Chinese Taipei) Lu Yen-hsun	7^{7}	6
7	(Germany) Peter Gojowczyk	6^{3}	3
(Croatia) Franko Škugor	4	6^{6}
6	(Estonia) Jürgen Zopp	6	7^{8}

Final
1	(Chinese Taipei) Lu Yen-hsun	7^{7}	6
6	(Estonia) Jürgen Zopp	6^{3}	1

=== Top half ===
First round
1	(Chinese Taipei) Y-h Lu	6	6
(South Africa) T Vorster	3	2
(Israel) A Weintraub	7	6
Q	(China) Z Zhang	5	0
(Germany) N Langer	6	6
(France) T Lamasine	3	4
WC	(China) Zhuoyang Qiu	0	1
8	(Italy) T Fabbiano	6	6
3	(Israel) D Sela	6	4	6^{3}
(Australia) J Thompson	3	6	7^{7}
WC	(China) Y He	6	6
Q	(Japan) T Niki	4	3
(Japan) H Moriya	4
Q	(Italy) R Ghedin	1^{r}
WC	(China) F Sun	2	1
7	(Germany) P Gojowczyk	6	6

Second round
1	(Chinese Taipei) Y-h Lu	6	7
(Israel) A Weintraub	2	5
(Germany) N Langer	4	5
8	(Italy) T Fabbiano	6	7
(Australia) J Thompson	6	6
WC	(China) Y He	1	4
(Japan) H Moriya	6^{8}	1
7	(Germany) P Gojowczyk	7^{10}	6

Quarterfinals
1	(Chinese Taipei) Y-h Lu	7	6
8	(Italy) T Fabbiano	5	3
(Australia) J Thompson	4	4
7	(Germany) P Gojowczyk	6	6

Semifinals
1	(Chinese Taipei) Y-h Lu	7^{7}	6
7	(Germany) P Gojowczyk	6^{3}	3

=== Bottom half ===
First round
5	(Japan) Y Nishioka	1	2
Q	(Germany) D Masur	6	6
(Belarus) U Ignatik	3	6	6
(China) D Wu	6	1	4
(Ukraine) D Molchanov	4	0
(Croatia) F Škugor	6	6
SE	(Italy) F Cipolla	6	3	6
4	(Japan) G Soeda	2	6	1
6	(Estonia) J Zopp	6	6
LL	(Germany) Florian Fallert	1	1
(China) Y Bai	3	1
(Croatia) M Pecotić	6	6
WC	(China) Yuanfeng Li	2	5
(Croatia) N Mektić	6	7
(China) Z Zhang	3	0
2	(Australia) J Duckworth	6	6

Second round
Q	(Germany) D Masur	7^{5}	6^{5}	6
(Belarus) U Ignatik	6^{5}	7^{7}	3
(Croatia) F Škugor	3	6	7
SE	(Italy) F Cipolla	6	1	5
6	(Estonia) J Zopp	6	7
(Croatia) M Pecotić	4	5
(Croatia) N Mektić	7^{7}	4	2
2	(Australia) J Duckworth	6^{4}	6	6

Quarterfinals
Q	(Germany) D Masur	6^{6}	0
(Croatia) F Škugor	7^{8}	6
6	(Estonia) J Zopp	7^{7}	6
2	(Australia) J Duckworth	6^{4}	3

Semifinals
(Croatia) F Škugor	4	6^{6}
6	(Estonia) J Zopp	6	7^{8}
