= 2019 Ningbo Challenger – Singles =

Singles
- 2019 Ningbo Challenger

Final
- Champion: (Japan) Yasutaka Uchiyama
- Runner-up: (Canada) Steven Diez
- Score: 6–1, 6–3

Events
Singles	Doubles
- Ningbo Challenger

Thomas Fabbiano was the defending champion but chose not to defend his title.

Yasutaka Uchiyama won the title after defeating Steven Diez 6–1, 6–3 in the final.

== Seeds ==
All seeds receive a bye into the second round.

1. (India) Prajnesh Gunneswaran (quarterfinals)
2. (United States) Bradley Klahn (semifinals)
3. (Spain) Alejandro Davidovich Fokina (semifinals)
4. (Japan) Yasutaka Uchiyama (champion)
5. (Japan) Go Soeda (second round)
6. (Chinese Taipei) Jason Jung (second round)
7. (Japan) Tatsuma Ito (third round)
8. (Australia) Alex Bolt (second round)
9. (Tunisia) Malek Jaziri (second round)
10. (Australia) Marc Polmans (second round)
11. (Canada) Steven Diez (final)
12. (China) Zhang Zhizhen (second round)
13. (Australia) Andrew Harris (second round)
14. (Spain) Enrique López Pérez (third round)
15. (Uzbekistan) Denis Istomin (second round)
16. (Serbia) Danilo Petrović (third round)

== Draw ==
Key

- Q = Qualifier
- WC = Wild card
- LL = Lucky loser
- Alt = Alternate
- ITF = ITF entry
- PR = Protected ranking
- SR = Special ranking
- SE = Special exempt
- JE = Junior exempt
- JR = Junior Accelerator Programme entrant
- CO = College Accelerator Programme entrant
- NG = Next Gen Accelerator Program entrant
- w/o = Walkover
- r = Retired
- d = Defaulted

=== Finals ===
Quarterfinals
1	(India) Prajnesh Gunneswaran	3	4
11	(Canada) Steven Diez	6	6
3	(Spain) Alejandro Davidovich Fokina	6^{3}	6	6
(Croatia) Borna Gojo	7^{7}	2	4
(Portugal) Frederico Ferreira Silva	5	2
4	(Japan) Yasutaka Uchiyama	7	6
(Japan) Hiroki Moriya	6	0	5
2	(United States) Bradley Klahn	4	6	7

Semifinals
11	(Canada) Steven Diez	6	6
3	(Spain) Alejandro Davidovich Fokina	1	3
4	(Japan) Yasutaka Uchiyama	4	6	6
2	(United States) Bradley Klahn	6	4	3

Final
11	(Canada) Steven Diez	1	3
4	(Japan) Yasutaka Uchiyama	6	6

=== Top half ===
==== Section 1 ====
First round
(Russia) I Nedelko	3	2
(Australia) M Purcell	6	6
(Chinese Taipei) T-h Yang	6	7^{7}
WC	(China) X Gao	2	6^{4}
(Egypt) M Safwat	0	5
(Kazakhstan) D Yevseyev	6	7
(Australia) A Vukic	5	3
(United States) C Eubanks	7	6

Second round
1	(India) P Gunneswaran	6	6
(Australia) M Purcell	3	4
(Chinese Taipei) T-h Yang	3	6	6
15	(Uzbekistan) D Istomin	6	3	2
11	(Canada) S Diez	6	7
(Kazakhstan) D Yevseyev	2	5
(United States) C Eubanks	7	7^{7}
5	(Japan) G Soeda	5	6^{1}

Third round
1	(India) P Gunneswaran	7^{7}	6
(Chinese Taipei) T-h Yang	6^{1}	3
11	(Canada) S Diez	7^{7}	7
(United States) C Eubanks	6^{1}	5

Quarterfinals
1	(India) P Gunneswaran	3	4
11	(Canada) S Diez	6	6

==== Section 2 ====
First round
(Japan) Shintaro Imai	4	4
WC	(China) F Sun	6	6
(South Korea) Y-s Chung	1	6	6
LL	(China) A Wang	6	2	1
WC	(China) Li Yuanfeng	3	7^{9}	1
(Croatia) B Gojo	6	6^{7}	6
(Chinese Taipei) C-h Tseng	4	6	4
(China) Ze Zhang	6	4	6

Second round
3	(Spain) A Davidovich Fokina	6^{6}	6	6
WC	(China) F Sun	7^{8}	2	4
(South Korea) Y-s Chung	3	3
16	(Serbia) D Petrović	6	6
10	(Australia) M Polmans	6^{6}	4
(Croatia) B Gojo	7^{8}	6
(China) Ze Zhang	6	6
8	(Australia) A Bolt	4	4

Third round
3	(Spain) A Davidovich Fokina	6	6
16	(Serbia) D Petrović	4	3
(Croatia) B Gojo	6	6^{4}	6
(China) Ze Zhang	3	7^{7}	2

Quarterfinals
3	(Spain) A Davidovich Fokina	6^{3}	6	6
(Croatia) B Gojo	7^{7}	2	4

=== Bottom half ===
==== Section 3 ====
First round
(Japan) K Uchida	2	7	6
Q	(France) F Reboul	6	5	3
WC	(China) J Cui	2	1
(Portugal) F Ferreira Silva	6	6
(Portugal) G Oliveira	5	0
Alt	(Colombia) N Barrientos	7	6
(China) D Wu	7^{7}	6
WC	(China) Y He	6^{2}	3

Second round
7	(Japan) T Ito	3	6	6
(Japan) K Uchida	6	3	4
(Portugal) F Ferreira Silva	7^{10}	6
9	(Tunisia) M Jaziri	6^{8}	4
14	(Spain) E López Pérez	6	6
Alt	(Colombia) N Barrientos	4	3
(China) D Wu	2	1
4	(Japan) Y Uchiyama	6	6

Third round
7	(Japan) T Ito	4	6^{5}
(Portugal) F Ferreira Silva	6	7^{7}
14	(Spain) E López Pérez	6^{5}	3
4	(Japan) Y Uchiyama	7^{7}	6

Quarterfinals
(Portugal) F Ferreira Silva	5	2
4	(Japan) Y Uchiyama	7	6

==== Section 4 ====
First round
(Australia) A Santillan	6	6
(China) Z Li	2	4
(Japan) H Moriya	1	6	6
(Chinese Taipei) T-l Wu	6	3	4
(South Korea) J-s Nam	6	6
(Japan) Shuichi Sekiguchi	1	1
(Japan) Yo Watanuki	6	4	6
Q	(India) Sidharth Rawat	4	6	3

Second round
6	(Chinese Taipei) J Jung	7^{7}	6^{5}	5
(Australia) A Santillan	6^{5}	7^{7}	7
(Japan) H Moriya	5	6	6
12	(China) Zh Zhang	7	2	1
13	(Australia) A Harris	3	5
(South Korea) J-s Nam	6	7
(Japan) Yo Watanuki	7^{7}	2	3
2	(United States) B Klahn	6^{5}	6	6

Third round
(Australia) A Santillan	7^{7}	3	4
(Japan) H Moriya	6^{5}	6	6
(South Korea) J-s Nam	6^{5}	6^{3}
2	(United States) B Klahn	7^{7}	7^{7}

Quarterfinals
(Japan) H Moriya	6	0	5
2	(United States) B Klahn	4	6	7
