= 2018 Ningbo Challenger – Doubles =

Doubles
- 2018 Ningbo Challenger

Final
- Champions: (China) Gong Maoxin (China) Zhang Ze
- Runners-up: (Chinese Taipei) Hsieh Cheng-peng (Indonesia) Christopher Rungkat
- Score: 7–5, 2–6, [10–5]

Events
Singles	Doubles
- Ningbo Challenger

Radu Albot and Rubin Statham were the defending champions but only Statham chose to defend his title, partnering Hiroki Moriya. Statham lost in the first round to Sriram Balaji and Saketh Myneni.

Gong Maoxin and Zhang Ze won the title after defeating Hsieh Cheng-peng and Christopher Rungkat 7–5, 2–6, [10–5] in the final.

== Seeds ==
1. (Chinese Taipei) Hsieh Cheng-peng / (Indonesia) Christopher Rungkat (final)
2. (China) Gong Maoxin / (China) Zhang Ze (champions)
3. (Spain) Enrique López Pérez / (Portugal) Gonçalo Oliveira (first round)
4. (Chinese Taipei) Peng Hsien-yin / (Thailand) Sonchat Ratiwatana (quarterfinals)

== Draw ==
Key

- Q = Qualifier
- WC = Wild card
- LL = Lucky loser
- Alt = Alternate
- ITF = ITF entry
- PR = Protected ranking
- SR = Special ranking
- SE = Special exempt
- JE = Junior exempt
- JR = Junior Accelerator Programme entrant
- CO = College Accelerator Programme entrant
- NG = Next Gen Accelerator Program entrant
- w/o = Walkover
- r = Retired
- d = Defaulted

First round
1	(Chinese Taipei) C-p Hsieh (Indonesia) C Rungkat	w/o
(Russia) A Pavlioutchenkov (Chinese Taipei) T-h Yang
(Belgium) K Coppejans (Egypt) M Safwat	1	4
WC	(China) F Sun (China) R Te	6	6
4	(Chinese Taipei) H-y Peng (Thailand) So Ratiwatana	1	7	[10]
WC	(China) Y He (China) D Wu	6	5	[8]
(Italy) T Fabbiano (Poland) H Hurkacz
(Serbia) M Kecmanović (China) Z Li	w/o
(Japan) H Moriya (New Zealand) R Statham	0	3
(India) S Balaji (India) S Myneni	6	6
(India) P Gunneswaran (India) A Kadhe	6	3	[10]
3	(Spain) E López Pérez (Portugal) G Oliveira	1	6	[7]
(Spain) A Davidovich Fokina (Italy) F Gaio	4	7	[11]
(India) S Nagal (India) R Ramanathan	6	5	[9]
WC	(China) Zhao Zhao (China) Zheng Wei Qiang	2	2
2	(China) M Gong (China) Ze Zhang	6	6

Quarterfinals
1	(Chinese Taipei) C-p Hsieh (Indonesia) C Rungkat	6	6
WC	(China) F Sun (China) R Te	4	2
4	(Chinese Taipei) H-y Peng (Thailand) So Ratiwatana	3	6^{5}
(Serbia) M Kecmanović (China) Z Li	6	7^{7}
(India) S Balaji (India) S Myneni	3	6	[7]
(India) P Gunneswaran (India) A Kadhe	6	2	[10]
(Spain) A Davidovich Fokina (Italy) F Gaio	2	3
2	(China) M Gong (China) Ze Zhang	6	6

Semifinals
1	(Chinese Taipei) C-p Hsieh (Indonesia) C Rungkat	6	4	[10]
(Serbia) M Kecmanović (China) Z Li	3	6	[8]
(India) P Gunneswaran (India) A Kadhe	6^{4}	2
2	(China) M Gong (China) Ze Zhang	7^{7}	6

Final
1	(Chinese Taipei) C-p Hsieh (Indonesia) C Rungkat	5	6	[5]
2	(China) M Gong (China) Ze Zhang	7	2	[10]
