= 2017 Ningbo Challenger – Singles =

Singles
- 2017 Ningbo Challenger

Final
- Champion: (Russia) Mikhail Youzhny
- Runner-up: (Japan) Taro Daniel
- Score: 6–1, 6–1

Events
Singles	Doubles
← 2016 ·	Ningbo Challenger	· 2018 →

Lu Yen-hsun was the defending champion but retired in the semifinals facing Taro Daniel.

Mikhail Youzhny won the title after defeating Daniel 6–1, 6–1 in the final.

== Seeds ==
1. (Chinese Taipei) Lu Yen-hsun (semifinals, retired)
2. (Australia) Jordan Thompson (quarterfinals)
3. (United States) Taylor Fritz (first round)
4. (Moldova) Radu Albot (first round)
5. (Chile) Nicolás Jarry (first round)
6. (Japan) Taro Daniel (final)
7. (Russia) Mikhail Youzhny (champion)
8. (Canada) Peter Polansky (quarterfinals)

== Draw ==
=== Key ===
- Q = Qualifier
- WC = Wild card
- LL = Lucky loser
- Alt = Alternate
- SE = Special exempt
- PR = Protected ranking
- ITF = ITF entry
- JE = Junior exempt
- w/o = Walkover
- r = Retired
- d = Defaulted
- SR = Special ranking

=== Finals ===
Semifinals
1	(Chinese Taipei) Lu Yen-hsun	2^{r}
6	(Japan) Taro Daniel	5
7	(Russia) Mikhail Youzhny	6	6
Q	(Austria) Jurij Rodionov	3	4

Final
6	(Japan) Taro Daniel	1	1
7	(Russia) Mikhail Youzhny	6	6

=== Top half ===
First round
1	(Chinese Taipei) Y-h Lu	6	4	6
(Japan) G Soeda	3	6	4
WC	(China) R Te	3	5
(Japan) T Ito	6	7
(Brazil) T Monteiro	4	7^{7}	6
(China) Ze Zhang	6	6^{4}	4
WC	(China) F Sun	2	6^{3}
8	(Canada) P Polansky	6	7^{7}
4	(Moldova) R Albot	4	3
(China) D Wu	6	6
(Serbia) M Kecmanović	6	2	6^{5}
Q	(Japan) Yo Watanuki	4	6	7^{7}
Q	(Australia) M Matosevic	6	6
(India) S Nagal	2	4
WC	(China) X Gao	2	4
6	(Japan) T Daniel	6	6

Second round
1	(Chinese Taipei) Y-h Lu	6	6
(Japan) T Ito	2	3
(Brazil) T Monteiro	6	6^{8}	4
8	(Canada) P Polansky	3	7^{10}	6
(China) D Wu	3	3
Q	(Japan) Yo Watanuki	6	6
Q	(Australia) M Matosevic	4	4
6	(Japan) T Daniel	6	6

Quarterfinals
1	(Chinese Taipei) Y-h Lu	6	6
8	(Canada) P Polansky	2	3
Q	(Japan) Yo Watanuki	3	7^{7}	3
6	(Japan) T Daniel	6	6^{2}	6

Semifinals
1	(Chinese Taipei) Y-h Lu	2^{r}
6	(Japan) T Daniel	5

=== Bottom half ===
First round
7	(Russia) M Youzhny	6	7
(Japan) Y Takahashi	2	5
(France) C Hemery	3	2
(Japan) H Moriya	6	6
(China) Z Li	7^{8}	6
(Chinese Taipei) J Jung	6^{6}	2
(South Korea) D-h Lee	6	3	6
3	(United States) T Fritz	3	6	3
5	(Chile) N Jarry	6^{5}	3
Q	(South Korea) Y-s Chung	7^{7}	6
Q	(Austria) J Rodionov	6	6
WC	(China) Y Wu	4	3
(Spain) A Menéndez Maceiras	3	6	6
(France) S Doumbia	6	2	1
(New Zealand) J Statham	4	2
2	(Australia) J Thompson	6	6

Second round
7	(Russia) M Youzhny	6	6
(Japan) H Moriya	3	4
(China) Z Li	6	6
(South Korea) D-h Lee	2	4
Q	(South Korea) Y-s Chung
Q	(Austria) J Rodionov	w/o
(Spain) A Menéndez Maceiras	3	4
2	(Australia) J Thompson	6	6

Quarterfinals
7	(Russia) M Youzhny	6	6
(China) Z Li	3	1
Q	(Austria) J Rodionov	3	7^{7}	6
2	(Australia) J Thompson	6	6^{5}	4

Semifinals
7	(Russia) M Youzhny	6	6
Q	(Austria) J Rodionov	3	4
