= 2016 Ningbo Challenger – Doubles =

Doubles
- 2016 Ningbo Challenger

Final
- Champions: (France) Jonathan Eysseric (Ukraine) Sergiy Stakhovsky
- Runners-up: (United States) Stefan Kozlov (Japan) Akira Santillan
- Score: 6–4, 7–6^{(7–4)}

Events
Singles	Doubles
- Ningbo Challenger

Dudi Sela and Amir Weintraub were the defending champions but chose not to defend their title.

Jonathan Eysseric and Sergiy Stakhovsky won the title after defeating Stefan Kozlov and Akira Santillan 6–4, 7–6^{(7–4)} in the final.

== Seeds ==
1. (Thailand) Sanchai Ratiwatana / (Thailand) Sonchat Ratiwatana (first round)
2. (China) Gong Maoxin / (China) Zhang Ze (semifinals)
3. (Russia) Mikhail Elgin / (Russia) Alexander Kudryavtsev (first round)
4. (Chinese Taipei) Chen Ti / (Chinese Taipei) Yi Chu-huan (semifinals)

== Draw ==
Key

- Q = Qualifier
- WC = Wild card
- LL = Lucky loser
- Alt = Alternate
- ITF = ITF entry
- PR = Protected ranking
- SR = Special ranking
- SE = Special exempt
- JE = Junior exempt
- JR = Junior Accelerator Programme entrant
- CO = College Accelerator Programme entrant
- NG = Next Gen Accelerator Program entrant
- w/o = Walkover
- r = Retired
- d = Defaulted

First round
1	(Thailand) Sa Ratiwatana (Thailand) So Ratiwatana	5	2
(United States) S Kozlov (Japan) A Santillan	7	6
(Japan) Yuya Kibi (United States) M Krueger	3	4
(South Korea) H Chung (South Korea) S-w Kwon	6	6
4	(Chinese Taipei) T Chen (Chinese Taipei) C-h Yi	3	6	[10]
(Chinese Taipei) C-p Hsieh (China) D Wu	6	1	[6]
(Chinese Taipei) H-y Peng (Japan) Y Uchiyama	7^{7}	6
WC	(China) Qi Xiao (China) Y Wu	6^{1}	3
(Italy) A Arnaboldi (Spain) P Riba	6	2	[6]
(Australia) M Matosevic (Japan) T Matsui	3	6	[10]
(France) J Eysseric (Ukraine) S Stakhovsky	6	1	[15]
3	(Russia) M Elgin (Russia) A Kudryavtsev	3	6	[13]
(Germany) D Masur (Australia) A Whittington	3	7^{7}	[5]
WC	(China) X Gao (China) F Sun	6	6^{1}	[10]
WC	(China) Y He (China) Wang Aoxiong	1	1
2	(China) M Gong (China) Z Zhang	6	6

Quarterfinals
(United States) S Kozlov (Japan) A Santillan	4	6	[11]
(South Korea) H Chung (South Korea) S-w Kwon	6	3	[9]
4	(Chinese Taipei) T Chen (Chinese Taipei) C-h Yi	5	6	[10]
(Chinese Taipei) H-y Peng (Japan) Y Uchiyama	7	2	[8]
(Australia) M Matosevic (Japan) T Matsui	1	2
(France) J Eysseric (Ukraine) S Stakhovsky	6	6
WC	(China) X Gao (China) F Sun	2	4
2	(China) M Gong (China) Z Zhang	6	6

Semifinals
(United States) S Kozlov (Japan) A Santillan	3	6	[10]
4	(Chinese Taipei) T Chen (Chinese Taipei) C-h Yi	6	4	[7]
(France) J Eysseric (Ukraine) S Stakhovsky	6	3	[11]
2	(China) M Gong (China) Z Zhang	3	6	[9]

Final
(United States) S Kozlov (Japan) A Santillan	4	6^{4}
(France) J Eysseric (Ukraine) S Stakhovsky	6	7^{7}
