= 2015 Ningbo Challenger =

- Date: 19–25 October
- Edition: 3rd (men)
- Surface: Hard
- Location: Ningbo, China

Champions

Singles
- (Chinese Taipei) Lu Yen-hsun

Doubles
- (Israel) Dudi Sela / (Israel) Amir Weintraub
- Ningbo Challenger

The 2015 Yinzhou Bank Cup was a professional tennis tournament played on hardcourt. It was the third edition of the tournament and part of the 2015 ATP Challenger Tour. It took place in Ningbo, China. The event was listed as a Challenger 125 and the prize money was $125,000.

== Seeds ==
Country	Player	Rank	Seed
TPE	Lu Yen-hsun	91	1
AUS	James Duckworth	101	2
ISR	Dudi Sela	114	3
JPN	Go Soeda	119	4
JPN	Yoshihito Nishioka	150	5
EST	Jürgen Zopp	158	6
GER	Peter Gojowczyk	165	7
ITA	Thomas Fabbiano	170	8

== Other entrants ==
The following players received wildcards into the singles main draw:

- (China) Qiu Zhuoyang
- (China) He Yecong
- (China) Sun Fajing
- (China) Li Yuanfeng

The following players received entry into the singles main draw as a special exempt:

- (Italy) Flavio Cipolla

The following players received entry from the qualifying draw:

- (China) Zhang Zhizhen
- (Japan) Takuto Niki
- (Italy) Riccardo Ghedin
- (Germany) Daniel Masur

The following player entered as a lucky loser:

- (Germany) Florian Fallert

== Champions ==
=== Singles ===
- (Chinese Taipei) Lu Yen-hsun def. (Estonia) Jürgen Zopp, 7–6^{(7–3)}, 6–1

=== Doubles ===
- (Israel) Dudi Sela / (Israel) Amir Weintraub def. (Croatia) Nikola Mektić / (Croatia) Franko Škugor, 6–3, 3–6, [10–6]
