= 2026 Ningbo Challenger – Singles =

Singles
- 2026 Ningbo Challenger

Final
- Champion: Yaroslav Demin
- Runner-up: Petr Bar Biryukov
- Score: 5–7, 6–2, 7–6^{(8–6)}

Events
Singles	Doubles
- Ningbo Challenger

Yasutaka Uchiyama was the defending champion but chose not to defend his title.

Yaroslav Demin won the title after defeating Petr Bar Biryukov 5–7, 6–2, 7–6^{(8–6)} in the final.

== Seeds ==
1. (Australia) Tristan Schoolkate (second round)
2. (United States) Keegan Smith (first round)
3. (France) Harold Mayot (quarterfinals)
4. (Sweden) Elias Ymer (first round)
5. (United Kingdom) Liam Broady (semifinals)
6. (Japan) Hayato Matsuoka (first round)
7. (Australia) James McCabe (first round)
8. (United Kingdom) Charles Broom (second round)

== Draw ==
Key

- Q = Qualifier
- WC = Wild card
- LL = Lucky loser
- Alt = Alternate
- ITF = ITF entry
- PR = Protected ranking
- SR = Special ranking
- SE = Special exempt
- JE = Junior exempt
- JR = Junior Accelerator Programme entrant
- CO = College Accelerator Programme entrant
- NG = Next Gen Accelerator Program entrant
- w/o = Walkover
- r = Retired
- d = Defaulted

=== Finals ===
Semifinals
Petr Bar Biryukov	6	1	6
5	(United Kingdom) Liam Broady	4	6	3
Q	Yaroslav Demin	7	1	6
(Chinese Taipei) Hsu Yu-hsiou	5	6	4

Final
Petr Bar Biryukov	7	2	6^{6}
Q	Yaroslav Demin	5	6	7^{8}

=== Top half ===
First round
1	(Australia) T Schoolkate	6	6
(Japan) M Imamura	4	3
WC	(China) Xiao Linang	4	2
(China) J Cui	6	6
P Bar Biryukov	6^{1}	7^{7}	6
Q	Semen Pankin	7^{7}	6^{5}	4
(China) F Sun	4	6	7
6	(Japan) H Matsuoka	6	3	5
4	(Sweden) E Ymer	6	6^{8}	4
(China) Y Zhou	1	7^{10}	6
(Australia) Ja Delaney	6	4	6
Q	(Italy) A Binda	4	6	4
Q	(Japan) Naoya Honda	5	6	7^{7}
Q	(Poland) F Peliwo	7	3	6^{3}
(Uzbekistan) S Fomin	7	6^{4}	2
5	(United Kingdom) L Broady	5	7^{7}	6

Second round
1	(Australia) T Schoolkate	2	6	2
(China) J Cui	6	3	6
P Bar Biryukov	5	6	6
(China) F Sun	7	3	4
(China) Y Zhou	6	4	4
(Australia) Ja Delaney	2	6	6
Q	(Japan) N Honda	1	7^{7}	4
5	(United Kingdom) L Broady	6	6^{3}	6

Quarterfinals
(China) J Cui	6	4	1
P Bar Biryukov	4	6	6
(Australia) Ja Delaney	1	6^{3}
5	(United Kingdom) L Broady	6	7^{7}

Semifinals
P Bar Biryukov	6	1	6
5	(United Kingdom) L Broady	4	6	3

=== Bottom half ===
First round
8	(United Kingdom) C Broom	6	6
(Japan) A Santillan	3	3
Q	Y Demin	6	6
(Denmark) CE Overbeck	4	4
(Serbia) O Milić	6^{4}	2
(Japan) K Uchida	7^{7}	6
WC	(China) Zhang Tianhui	3	4
3	(France) H Mayot	6	6
7	(Australia) J McCabe	1	6	6^{1}
Q	(Japan) H Moriya	6	2	7^{7}
WC	(China) R Te	6^{3}	4
(Turkey) Mert Alkaya	7^{7}	6
(Croatia) M Poljičak	7^{7}	3	4
(Japan) Y Shimizu	6^{2}	6	6
(Chinese Taipei) Y-h Hsu	4	7	7^{9}
2	(United States) K Smith	6	5	6^{7}

Second round
8	(United Kingdom) C Broom	1	3
Q	Y Demin	6	6
(Japan) K Uchida	2	3
3	(France) H Mayot	6	6
Q	(Japan) H Moriya	3	6	4
(Turkey) M Alkaya	6	3	6
(Japan) Y Shimizu	5	6	4
(Chinese Taipei) Y-h Hsu	7	3	6

Quarterfinals
Q	Y Demin	6	6
3	(France) H Mayot	3	4
(Turkey) M Alkaya	3	3
(Chinese Taipei) Y-h Hsu	6	6

Semifinals
Q	Y Demin	7	1	6
(Chinese Taipei) Y-h Hsu	5	6	4
