= 2016 Ningbo Challenger – Singles =

Singles
- 2016 Ningbo Challenger

Final
- Champion: (Chinese Taipei) Lu Yen-hsun
- Runner-up: (Japan) Hiroki Moriya
- Score: 6–3, 6–1

Events
Singles	Doubles
← 2015 ·	Ningbo Challenger	· 2017 →

Lu Yen-hsun was the defending champion and successfully defended his title.

Lu won the title after defeating Hiroki Moriya 6–3, 6–1 in the final.

== Seeds ==
1. (Australia) John Millman (semifinals, retired)
2. (Chinese Taipei) Lu Yen-hsun (champion)
3. (Australia) Jordan Thompson (withdrew)
4. (Ukraine) Sergiy Stakhovsky (first round)
5. (Japan) Go Soeda (quarterfinals)
6. (South Korea) Chung Hyeon (semifinals)
7. (United States) Stefan Kozlov (quarterfinals)
8. (South Korea) Lee Duck-hee (quarterfinals)

== Draw ==
=== Key ===
- Q = Qualifier
- WC = Wild card
- LL = Lucky loser
- Alt = Alternate
- SE = Special exempt
- PR = Protected ranking
- ITF = ITF entry
- JE = Junior exempt
- w/o = Walkover
- r = Retired
- d = Defaulted
- SR = Special ranking

=== Finals ===
Semifinals
1	(Australia) John Millman	2	3^{r}
(Japan) Hiroki Moriya	6	4
6	(South Korea) Chung Hyeon	7^{7}	6^{7}	2
2	(Chinese Taipei) Lu Yen-hsun	6^{3}	7^{9}	6

Final
(Japan) Hiroki Moriya	3	1
2	(Chinese Taipei) Lu Yen-hsun	6	6

=== Top half ===
First round
1	(Australia) J Millman	6	6
(United States) M Krueger	1	2
(Germany) P Gojowczyk	6	7^{7}
(Japan) A Santillan	2	6^{3}
Q	(Japan) Shuichi Sekiguchi	6	7
WC	(China) F Sun	3	5
(Italy) A Arnaboldi	4	6	2
5	(Japan) G Soeda	6	3	6
4	(Ukraine) S Stakhovsky	4	3
(Japan) Y Uchiyama	6	6
(Japan) H Moriya	7^{7}	7
(Australia) A Whittington	6^{4}	5
(Germany) D Masur	6	6
(Chinese Taipei) T Chen	4	4
Q	(Germany) Y Hanfmann	2	4
8	(South Korea) D-h Lee	6	6

Second round
1	(Australia) J Millman	7^{8}	6
(Germany) P Gojowczyk	6^{6}	2
Q	(Japan) S Sekiguchi	3	0
5	(Japan) G Soeda	6	6
(Japan) Y Uchiyama	6	4	4
(Japan) H Moriya	2	6	6
(Germany) D Masur	3	1
8	(South Korea) D-h Lee	6	6

Quarterfinals
1	(Australia) J Millman	6	6
5	(Japan) G Soeda	3	4
(Japan) H Moriya	6	6
8	(South Korea) D-h Lee	2	2

Semifinals
1	(Australia) J Millman	2	3^{r}
(Japan) H Moriya	6	4

=== Bottom half ===
First round
6	(South Korea) H Chung	7^{7}	6
WC	(China) Z Zhang	6^{5}	4
(South Korea) S-w Kwon	7^{7}	6^{10}	4
WC	(China) Y Wu	6^{0}	7^{12}	6
Q	(France) S Doumbia	6	7
WC	(China) C Wang	2	5
(Australia) M Matosevic	3	6^{5}
LL	(South Korea) Kim Cheong-eui	6	7^{7}
7	(United States) S Kozlov	6	6
Q	(Chinese Taipei) J Wang	2	4
(China) D Wu	6	6
(Spain) P Riba	3	4
(Russia) A Kudryavtsev	7^{7}	4	6
(Japan) Yuya Kibi	6^{0}	6	3
(France) J Eysseric	2	6^{3}
2	(Chinese Taipei) Y-h Lu	6	7^{7}

Second round
6	(South Korea) H Chung	6	6
WC	(China) Y Wu	1	1
Q	(France) S Doumbia	4	4
LL	(South Korea) C-e Kim	6	6
7	(United States) S Kozlov	7^{7}	6
(China) D Wu	6^{4}	3
(Russia) A Kudryavtsev	5	4
2	(Chinese Taipei) Y-h Lu	7	6

Quarterfinals
6	(South Korea) H Chung	6	6
LL	(South Korea) C-e Kim	3	4
7	(United States) S Kozlov	6	4	4
2	(Chinese Taipei) Y-h Lu	3	6	6

Semifinals
6	(South Korea) H Chung	7^{7}	6^{7}	2
2	(Chinese Taipei) Y-h Lu	6^{3}	7^{9}	6
