= 2026 Ningbo Challenger – Doubles =

Doubles
- 2026 Ningbo Challenger

Final
- Champions: (Japan) Akira Santillan (China) Zheng Baoluo
- Runners-up: (Chinese Taipei) Hsieh Cheng-peng (Japan) Kaichi Uchida
- Score: 6–3, 7–5

Events
Singles	Doubles
- Ningbo Challenger

Andrew Harris and Marc Polmans were the defending champions but chose not to defend their title.

Akira Santillan and Zheng Baoluo won the title after defeating Hsieh Cheng-peng and Kaichi Uchida 6–3, 7–5 in the final.

== Seeds ==
1. (United Kingdom) Finn Bass / (United Kingdom) Scott Duncan (quarterfinals)
2. (Australia) Jake Delaney / (China) Wang Aoran (semifinals)
3. (Japan) Taisei Ichikawa / (Japan) Yuta Shimizu (quarterfinals)
4. Petr Bar Biryukov / (Italy) Alexander Binda (first round)

== Draw ==
Key

- Q = Qualifier
- WC = Wild card
- LL = Lucky loser
- Alt = Alternate
- ITF = ITF entry
- PR = Protected ranking
- SR = Special ranking
- SE = Special exempt
- JE = Junior exempt
- JR = Junior Accelerator Programme entrant
- CO = College Accelerator Programme entrant
- NG = Next Gen Accelerator Program entrant
- w/o = Walkover
- r = Retired
- d = Defaulted

First round
1	(United Kingdom) F Bass (United Kingdom) S Duncan	7^{7}	1	[10]
WC	(China) Jin Yuquan (China) Sun Qian	6^{4}	6	[5]
(Japan) A Santillan (China) B Zheng	5	6	[10]
S Betov (Sweden) E Ymer	7	1	[5]
3	(Japan) T Ichikawa (Japan) Y Shimizu	6	6
(Chinese Taipei) J Hsu (Japan) Yamato Sueoka	1	4
(Malaysia) Mitsuki Wei Kang Leong; Semen Pankin	4	3
(Serbia) O Milić (Croatia) M Poljičak	6	6
(Japan) M Imamura (Japan) Ryuki Matsuda	6	6
WC	(China) Hu Jia (China) S Tang	2	3
(Chinese Taipei) C-p Hsieh (Japan) K Uchida	6	6
4	P Bar Biryukov (Italy) A Binda	3	4
(Japan) Y Kusuhara (Japan) S Nakagawa	6	6
Y Demin; Timofei Derepasko	4	4
(Chinese Taipei) Y-h Hsu (China) F Sun	6^{2}	6^{2}
2	(Australia) Ja Delaney (China) A Wang	7^{7}	7^{7}

Quarterfinals
1	(United Kingdom) F Bass (United Kingdom) S Duncan	3	6^{7}
(Japan) A Santillan (China) B Zheng	6	7^{9}
3	(Japan) T Ichikawa (Japan) Y Shimizu	1	6	[12]
(Serbia) O Milić (Croatia) M Poljičak	6	4	[14]
(Japan) M Imamura (Japan) R Matsuda	3	2
(Chinese Taipei) C-p Hsieh (Japan) K Uchida	6	6
(Japan) Y Kusuhara (Japan) S Nakagawa	3	6^{1}
2	(Australia) Ja Delaney (China) A Wang	6	7^{7}

Semifinals
(Japan) A Santillan (China) B Zheng	w/o
(Serbia) O Milić (Croatia) M Poljičak
(Chinese Taipei) C-p Hsieh (Japan) K Uchida	6	6
2	(Australia) Ja Delaney (China) A Wang	4	4

Final
(Japan) A Santillan (China) B Zheng	6	7
(Chinese Taipei) C-p Hsieh (Japan) K Uchida	3	5
