= 2018 Ningbo Challenger – Singles =

Singles
- 2018 Ningbo Challenger

Final
- Champion: (Italy) Thomas Fabbiano
- Runner-up: (India) Prajnesh Gunneswaran
- Score: 7–6^{(7–4)}, 4–6, 6–3

Events
Singles	Doubles
- Ningbo Challenger

Mikhail Youzhny was the defending champion but retired from professional tennis earlier in the year.

Thomas Fabbiano won the title after defeating Prajnesh Gunneswaran 7–6^{(7–4)}, 4–6, 6–3 in the final.

== Seeds ==
1. (Poland) Hubert Hurkacz (second round)
2. (Moldova) Radu Albot (semifinals)
3. (Italy) Thomas Fabbiano (champion)
4. (India) Ramkumar Ramanathan (first round)
5. (Serbia) Miomir Kecmanović (semifinals)
6. (Spain) Enrique López Pérez (first round)
7. (India) Prajnesh Gunneswaran (final)
8. (Japan) Tatsuma Ito (quarterfinals)

== Draw ==
Key

- Q = Qualifier
- WC = Wild card
- LL = Lucky loser
- Alt = Alternate
- ITF = ITF entry
- PR = Protected ranking
- SR = Special ranking
- SE = Special exempt
- JE = Junior exempt
- JR = Junior Accelerator Programme entrant
- CO = College Accelerator Programme entrant
- NG = Next Gen Accelerator Program entrant
- w/o = Walkover
- r = Retired
- d = Defaulted

=== Finals ===
Semifinals
5	(Serbia) Miomir Kecmanović	2	2
7	(India) Prajnesh Gunneswaran	6	6
3	(Italy) Thomas Fabbiano	6	6
2	(Moldova) Radu Albot	1	3

Final
7	(India) Prajnesh Gunneswaran	6^{4}	6	3
3	(Italy) Thomas Fabbiano	7^{7}	4	6

=== Top half ===
First round
1	(Poland) H Hurkacz	6	7^{7}
WC	(China) Xia Zihao	3	6^{3}
Q	(Norway) V Durasovic	6	7
WC	(China) Y Wu	4	5
(Chinese Taipei) T-h Yang	3	5
(Spain) A Davidovich Fokina	6	7
WC	(China) Y He	1	4
5	(Serbia) M Kecmanović	6	6
4	(India) R Ramanathan	6	6^{7}	6^{2}
(South Korea) Y-s Chung	1	7^{9}	7^{7}
(United Kingdom) L Broady	2	5
(Japan) Yo Watanuki	6	7
(China) Z Li	4	7^{7}	6
(Portugal) G Oliveira	6	6^{5}	3
(Egypt) M Safwat	6^{7}	2
7	(India) P Gunneswaran	7^{9}	6

Second round
1	(Poland) H Hurkacz	6^{4}	4
Q	(Norway) V Durasovic	7^{7}	6
(Spain) A Davidovich Fokina	6	3	4
5	(Serbia) M Kecmanović	4	6	6
(South Korea) Y-s Chung	2	7^{7}	6
(Japan) Yo Watanuki	6	6^{5}	3
(China) Z Li	3	6	6^{0}
7	(India) P Gunneswaran	6	2	7^{7}

Quarterfinals
Q	(Norway) V Durasovic	2	4
5	(Serbia) M Kecmanović	6	6
(South Korea) Y-s Chung	2	1
7	(India) P Gunneswaran	6	6

Semifinals
5	(Serbia) M Kecmanović	2	2
7	(India) P Gunneswaran	6	6

=== Bottom half ===
First round
6	(Spain) E López Pérez	6^{9}	6	6^{7}
(Japan) G Soeda	7^{11}	3	7^{9}
(Italy) F Gaio	6	2	6
(Belgium) K Coppejans	3	6	4
(Japan) H Moriya	6	6
(China) D Wu	4	4
(India) S Nagal	6	4	2
3	(Italy) T Fabbiano	4	6	6
8	(Japan) T Ito	7^{7}	6
Q	(Japan) Y Takahashi	6^{3}	3
(China) Ze Zhang	1	2
WC	(China) R Te	6	6
(Japan) Renta Tokuda	6	6
Q	(India) S Myneni	3	2
Q	(China) F Sun	4	3
2	(Moldova) R Albot	6	6

Second round
(Japan) G Soeda	4	6^{7}
(Italy) F Gaio	6	7^{9}
(Japan) H Moriya	4	4
3	(Italy) T Fabbiano	6	6
8	(Japan) T Ito	6	6
WC	(China) R Te	4	4
(Japan) R Tokuda	4	6^{3}
2	(Moldova) R Albot	6	7^{7}

Quarterfinals
(Italy) F Gaio	6	4	4
3	(Italy) T Fabbiano	1	6	6
8	(Japan) T Ito	5	4
2	(Moldova) R Albot	7	6

Semifinals
3	(Italy) T Fabbiano	6	6
2	(Moldova) R Albot	1	3
