= 2019 Ningbo Challenger =

- Date: 14–20 October
- Edition: 7th
- Surface: Hard
- Location: Ningbo, China

Champions

Singles
- (Japan) Yasutaka Uchiyama

Doubles
- (Australia) Andrew Harris / (Australia) Marc Polmans
- Ningbo Challenger

The 2019 Ningbo Challenger was a professional tennis tournament played on hard courts. It was the seventh edition of the tournament and part of the 2019 ATP Challenger Tour. It took place in Ningbo, China between 14 and 20 October 2019.

== Singles entrants ==
=== Seeds ===
Country	Player	Rank	Seed^{1}
IND	Prajnesh Gunneswaran	82	1
USA	Bradley Klahn	96	2
ESP	Alejandro Davidovich Fokina	102	3
JPN	Yasutaka Uchiyama	110	4
JPN	Go Soeda	125	5
TPE	Jason Jung	134	6
JPN	Tatsuma Ito	137	7
AUS	Alex Bolt	138	8
TUN	Malek Jaziri	149	9
AUS	Marc Polmans	154	10
CAN	Steven Diez	158	11
CHN	Zhang Zhizhen	179	12
AUS	Andrew Harris	186	13
ESP	Enrique López Pérez	188	14
UZB	Denis Istomin	195	15
SRB	Danilo Petrović	196	16

- ^{1} Rankings are as of 7 October 2019

=== Other entrants ===
The following players received wildcards into the singles main draw:

- (China) Cui Jie
- (China) Gao Xin
- (China) He Yecong
- (China) Li Yuanfeng
- (China) Sun Fajing

The following player received entry into the singles main draw as an alternate:

- (Colombia) Nicolás Barrientos

The following players received entry from the qualifying draw:

- (India) Sidharth Rawat
- (France) Fabien Reboul

The following player received entry as a lucky loser:

- (China) Wang Aoran

== Champions ==
=== Singles ===
- (Japan) Yasutaka Uchiyama def. (Canada) Steven Diez 6–1, 6–3.

=== Doubles ===
- (Australia) Andrew Harris / (Australia) Marc Polmans def. (Australia) Alex Bolt / (Australia) Matt Reid 6–0, 6–1.
