= 2012 Ningbo Challenger – Women's doubles =

Women's doubles
- 2012 Ningbo Challenger

Final
- Champion: (Japan) Shuko Aoyama (Chinese Taipei) Chang Kai-chen
- Runner-up: (United States) Tetiana Luzhanska (China) Zheng Saisai
- Score: 6–2, 7–5

Events
| Singles | men | women |
| Doubles | men | women |
- Ningbo Challenger

Tetiana Luzhanska and Zheng Saisai are the defending champions.

Shuko Aoyama and Chang Kai-chen won the title, defeating Luzhanska and Zheng 6–2, 7–5 in the final.

== Seeds ==
1. (Chinese Taipei) Chan Hao-ching / (Japan) Rika Fujiwara (first round)
2. (Thailand) Tamarine Tanasugarn / (China) Zhang Shuai (first round)
3. (United Kingdom) Anne Keothavong / (Luxembourg) Mandy Minella (first round)
4. (United States) Jill Craybas / (Ukraine) Olga Savchuk (quarterfinals)

== Draw ==
Key

- Q = Qualifier
- WC = Wild card
- LL = Lucky loser
- Alt = Alternate
- ITF = ITF entry
- PR = Protected ranking
- SR = Special ranking
- SE = Special exempt
- JE = Junior exempt
- JR = Junior Accelerator Programme entrant
- CO = College Accelerator Programme entrant
- NG = Next Gen Accelerator Program entrant
- w/o = Walkover
- r = Retired
- d = Defaulted

=== Draw ===
First round
1 | (Chinese Taipei) H-c Chan (Japan) R Fujiwara | 6 | 4 | [6]
(United States) T Luzhanska (China) S Zheng | 2 | 6 | [10]
(China) W Liu (China) S Sun | 6 | 7^{7}
(Thailand) L Kumkhum (Thailand) V Wongteanchai | 3 | 6^{3}
4 | (United States) J Craybas (Ukraine) O Savchuk | 6 | 6
WC | (China) C Liang (China) R Tian | 4 | 4
WC | (China) Y Hu (China) K Zhang | 5 | 6 | [0]
(Chinese Taipei) C-w Chan (China) Y Xu | 7 | 4 | [10]
(Chinese Taipei) S-y Hsieh (Chinese Taipei) S-w Hsieh | 2 | 2
(Japan) S Aoyama (Chinese Taipei) K-c Chang | 6 | 6
(Australia) M Adamczak (China) X Han | 6 | 6
3 | (United Kingdom) A Keothavong (Luxembourg) M Minella | 1 | 2
(Italy) A Brianti (France) C Garcia | w/o
WC | (China) Y Duan (China) Y Zhou
(Japan) E Sema (Japan) Y Sema | 6 | 6
2 | (Thailand) T Tanasugarn (China) S Zhang | 1 | 3

Quarterfinals
(United States) T Luzhanska (China) S Zheng | 6 | 7^{7}
(China) W Liu (China) S Sun | 1 | 6^{5}
4 | (United States) J Craybas (Ukraine) O Savchuk | 2 | 5
(Chinese Taipei) C-w Chan (China) Y Xu | 6 | 7
(Japan) S Aoyama (Chinese Taipei) K-c Chang | 3 | 6 | [11]
(Australia) M Adamczak (China) X Han | 6 | 4 | [9]
(Italy) A Brianti (France) C Garcia | 5 | 7^{7} | [8]
(Japan) E Sema (Japan) Y Sema | 7 | 6^{4} | [10]

Semifinals
(United States) T Luzhanska (China) S Zheng | 6 | 6
(Chinese Taipei) C-w Chan (China) Y Xu | 3 | 2
(Japan) S Aoyama (Chinese Taipei) K-c Chang | 6 | 6
(Japan) E Sema (Japan) Y Sema | 3 | 2

Finals
(United States) T Luzhanska (China) S Zheng | 2 | 5
(Japan) S Aoyama (Chinese Taipei) K-c Chang | 6 | 7
