= 2012 Ningbo Challenger – Women's singles =

Women's singles
- 2012 Ningbo Challenger

Final
- Champion: (Chinese Taipei) Hsieh Su-wei
- Runner-up: (China) Zhang Shuai
- Score: 6–2, 6–2

Events
Singles	men	women
Doubles	men	women
- Ningbo Challenger

Anastasiya Yakimova was the defending champion, having won the event in 2011, but chose not to participate in 2012.

Hsieh Su-wei won the title, defeating Zhang Shuai in the final, 6–2, 6–2.

== Seeds ==
1. (Chinese Taipei) Hsieh Su-wei (champion)
2. (Luxembourg) Mandy Minella (second round)
3. (United Kingdom) Anne Keothavong (first round)
4. (Chinese Taipei) Chang Kai-chen (second round)
5. (Japan) Erika Sema (first round)
6. (Russia) Valeria Savinykh (first round)
7. (Italy) Alberta Brianti (quarterfinals)
8. (Portugal) Maria João Koehler (first round)

== Main draw ==
Key

- Q = Qualifier
- WC = Wild card
- LL = Lucky loser
- Alt = Alternate
- ITF = ITF entry
- PR = Protected ranking
- SR = Special ranking
- SE = Special exempt
- JE = Junior exempt
- JR = Junior Accelerator Programme entrant
- CO = College Accelerator Programme entrant
- NG = Next Gen Accelerator Program entrant
- w/o = Walkover
- r = Retired
- d = Defaulted

=== Finals ===
Semifinals
1	(Chinese Taipei) Hsieh Su-wei	6	6
(China) Duan Yingying	4	4
(Thailand) Tamarine Tanasugarn	4	5
(China) Zhang Shuai	6	7

Final
1	(Chinese Taipei) Hsieh Su-wei	6	6
(China) Zhang Shuai	2	2

=== Top half ===
First round
1	(Chinese Taipei) S-w Hsieh	6	6
Q	(China) Z Yang	4	0
(Ukraine) O Savchuk	2	6	6
(Australia) M Adamczak	6	4	2
(Japan) Y Sema	3	6	2
(China) S Zheng	6	4	6
(Japan) K Nara	6	6
8	(Portugal) MJ Koehler	3	4
4	(Chinese Taipei) K-c Chang	4	6	6
(Thailand) L Kumkhum	6	4	1
(France) C Garcia	3	1
Q	(China) Y Zhou	6	6
(Serbia) A Krunić	6	6
(China) Q Wang	4	3
(China) Y Duan	6	7
6	(Russia) V Savinykh	4	5

Second round
1	(Chinese Taipei) S-w Hsieh	7	3	6
(Ukraine) O Savchuk	5	6	1
(China) S Zheng	4	1
(Japan) K Nara	6	6
4	(Chinese Taipei) K-c Chang	7	3	4
Q	(China) Y Zhou	5	6	6
(Serbia) A Krunić	6	2	3
(China) Y Duan	4	6	6

Quarterfinals
1	(Chinese Taipei) S-w Hsieh	6	6
(Japan) K Nara	4	4
Q	(China) Y Zhou	3	4
(China) Y Duan	6	6

Semifinals
1	(Chinese Taipei) S-w Hsieh	6	6
(China) Y Duan	4	4

=== Bottom half ===
First round
7	(Italy) A Brianti	6	6
(France) V Larrière	1	3
WC	(China) X Han	6	2	3
Q	(United States) T Luzhanska	3	6	6
SR	(Kazakhstan) Z Diyas	3	4
(Thailand) T Tanasugarn	6	6
(France) I Pavlovic	7	6
3	(United Kingdom) A Keothavong	5	1
5	(Japan) E Sema	4	6	4
(United States) J Craybas	6	0	6
Q	(China) F Liu	2	3
(China) S Zhang	6	6
WC	(China) Y Xu	7^{7}	6
WC	(China) HC Tang	6^{4}	3
WC	(China) Y Wang	7	3	5
2	(Luxembourg) M Minella	5	6	7

Second round
7	(Italy) A Brianti	6	6
Q	(United States) T Luzhanska	3	0
(Thailand) T Tanasugarn	6	4	6
(France) I Pavlovic	3	6	1
(United States) J Craybas	5	4
(China) S Zhang	7	6
WC	(China) Y Xu	6^{7}	7^{7}	6
2	(Luxembourg) M Minella	7^{9}	6^{4}	1

Quarterfinals
7	(Italy) A Brianti	6	5	6^{4}
(Thailand) T Tanasugarn	3	7	7^{7}
(China) S Zhang	6	6
WC	(China) Y Xu	0	1

Semifinals
(Thailand) T Tanasugarn	4	5
(China) S Zhang	6	7
