= 2016 Ningbo Challenger =

- Date: 17–23 October
- Edition: 4th (men)
- Surface: Hard
- Location: Ningbo, China

Champions

Singles
- (Chinese Taipei) Lu Yen-hsun

Doubles
- (France) Jonathan Eysseric / (Ukraine) Sergiy Stakhovsky
- Ningbo Challenger

The 2016 Ningbo Challenger was a professional tennis tournament played on hard courts. It was the fourth edition of the tournament and part of the 2016 ATP Challenger Tour. It took place in Ningbo, China.

== Singles entrants ==
=== Seeds ===
Country	Player	Rank^{1}	Seed
AUS	John Millman	74	1
TPE	Lu Yen-hsun	79	2
AUS	~~Jordan Thompson~~	~~99~~	~~3~~
UKR	Sergiy Stakhovsky	119	4
JPN	Go Soeda	129	5
KOR	Chung Hyeon	140	6
USA	Stefan Kozlov	156	7
KOR	Lee Duck-hee	157	8

- ^{1} Rankings are as of 10 October 2016.

=== Other entrants ===
The following players received wildcards into the singles main draw:

- (China) Zhang Ze
- (China) Wu Yibing
- (China) Sun Fajing
- (China) Wang Chuhan

The following players received entry from the qualifying draw:

- (Chinese Taipei) Jimmy Wang
- (Japan) Shuichi Sekiguchi
- (France) Sadio Doumbia
- (Germany) Yannick Hanfmann

The following player entered as a lucky loser:

- (South Korea) Cheong-eui Kim

== Champions ==
=== Singles ===
- (Chinese Taipei) Yen-hsun Lu def. (Japan) Hiroki Moriya, 6–3, 6–1.

=== Doubles ===
- (France) Jonathan Eysseric / (Ukraine) Sergiy Stakhovsky def. (United States) Stefan Kozlov / (Japan) Akira Santillan, 6–4, 7–6^{(7–4)}.
