= 2026 Ningbo Challenger =

- Date: 26 October – 1 November
- Edition: 8th
- Surface: Hard
- Location: Ningbo, China

Champions

Singles
- Yaroslav Demin

Doubles
- (Japan) Akira Santillan / (China) Zheng Baoluo
- Ningbo Challenger

The 2026 Yinzhou Bank Challenger was a professional tennis tournament played on hardcourts. It was the eighth edition of the tournament, and the first since 2019. The event was part of the 2026 ATP Challenger Tour and took place at the Yinzhou Tennis Center in Ningbo, China, from 26 October to 1 November 2026.

== Singles main-draw entrants ==
=== Seeds ===
Country	Player	Rank^{1}	Seed
AUS	Tristan Schoolkate	169	1
USA	Keegan Smith	196	2
FRA	Harold Mayot	202	3
SWE	Elias Ymer	228	4
GBR	Liam Broady	233	5
JPN	Hayato Matsuoka	242	6
AUS	James McCabe	247	7
GBR	Charles Broom	264	8

- ^{1} Rankings are as of 19 October 2026.

=== Other entrants ===
The following players received wildcards into the singles main draw:

- (China) Te Rigele
- (China) Xiao Linang
- (China) Zhang Tianhui

The following players received entry from the qualifying draw:

- (Italy) Alexander Binda
- Yaroslav Demin
- (Japan) Naoya Honda
- (Japan) Hiroki Moriya
- Semen Pankin
- (Poland) Filip Peliwo

== Champions ==
=== Singles ===
- Yaroslav Demin def. Petr Bar Biryukov 5–7, 6–2, 7–6^{(8–6)}.

=== Doubles ===
- (Japan) Akira Santillan / (China) Zheng Baoluo def. (Chinese Taipei) Hsieh Cheng-peng / (Japan) Kaichi Uchida 6–3, 7–5.
