= 2012 Ningbo Challenger =

- Date: 10–16 September
- Edition: 3rd (women); 2nd (men)
- Prize money: $100,000+H (women) $50,000+H (men)
- Surface: Hard
- Location: Ningbo, China

Champions

Men's singles
- (Germany) Peter Gojowczyk

Women's singles
- (Chinese Taipei) Hsieh Su-wei

Men's doubles
- (Thailand) Sanchai Ratiwatana / (Thailand) Sonchat Ratiwatana

Women's doubles
- (Japan) Shuko Aoyama / (Chinese Taipei) Chang Kai-chen
- Ningbo Challenger

The 2012 Ningbo Challenger was a professional tennis tournament played on hard courts. It was the second edition of the tournament (third for women) which was part of the 2012 ATP Challenger Tour and the 2012 ITF Women's Circuit. It took place in Ningbo, China, on 10–16 September 2012.

== ATP entrants ==
=== Seeds ===
Country	Player	Rank^{1}	Seed
TPE	Lu Yen-hsun	64	1
CHN	Zhang Ze	171	2
TPE	Jimmy Wang	182	3
CHN	Wu Di	206	4
TPE	Yang Tsung-hua	213	5
USA	Michael Yani	228	6
JPN	Hiroki Moriya	231	7
TPE	Chen Ti	250	8

- ^{1} Rankings as of 27 August 2012

=== Other entrants ===
The following players received wildcards into the singles main draw:

- (China) Gao Xin
- (China) Gong Maoxin
- (China) Wang Chuhan
- (China) Zhou Zhuo-Qing

The following players received entry from the qualifying draw:

- (Germany) Jaan-Frederik Brunken
- (South Korea) Jeong Suk-Young
- (China) Wang Ruikai
- (Chinese Taipei) Yi Chu-huan

== WTA entrants ==
=== Seeds ===
Country	Player	Rank^{1}	Seed
TPE	Hsieh Su-wei	57	1
LUX	Mandy Minella	79	2
GBR	Anne Keothavong	81	3
TPE	Chang Kai-chen	113	4
JPN	Erika Sema	126	5
RUS	Valeria Savinykh	128	6
ITA	Alberta Brianti	132	7
POR	Maria João Koehler	140	8

- ^{1} Rankings as of 27 August 2012

=== Other entrants ===
The following players received wildcards into the singles main draw:

- (China) Han Xinyun
- (China) Tang Haochen
- (China) Xu Yifan
- (China) Wang Yafan

The following players received entry from the qualifying draw:

- (China) Liu Fangzhou
- (United States) Tetiana Luzhanska
- (China) Yang Zhaoxuan
- (China) Zhou Yimiao

The following players received entry by a Special Ranking:

- (Kazakhstan) Zarina Diyas

== Champions ==
=== Men's singles ===
- (Germany) Peter Gojowczyk def. (South Korea) Jeong Suk-Young 6–3, 6–1

=== Women's singles ===
- (Chinese Taipei) Hsieh Su-wei def. (China) Zhang Shuai 6–2, 6–2

=== Men's doubles ===
- (Thailand) Sanchai Ratiwatana / (Thailand) Sonchat Ratiwatana def. (China) Gong Maoxin / (China) Zhang Ze 6–4, 6–2

=== Women's doubles ===
- (Japan) Shuko Aoyama / (Chinese Taipei) Chang Kai-chen def. (United States) Tetiana Luzhanska / (China) Zheng Saisai 6–2, 7–5
