= 2012 Ningbo Challenger – Men's doubles =

Men's doubles
- 2012 Ningbo Challenger

Final
- Champions: (Thailand) Sanchai Ratiwatana (Thailand) Sonchat Ratiwatana
- Runners-up: (China) Gong Maoxin (China) Zhang Ze
- Score: 6–4, 6–2

Events
Singles	men	women
Doubles	men	women
- Ningbo Challenger

Karan Rastogi and Divij Sharan were the defending champions but decided not to participate.
Sanchai Ratiwatana and Sonchat Ratiwatana won the title, defeating Gong Maoxin and Zhang Ze 6–4, 6–2 in the final.

== Seeds ==
1. (Thailand) Sanchai Ratiwatana / (Thailand) Sonchat Ratiwatana (champions)
2. (Chinese Taipei) Lee Hsin-han / (Chinese Taipei) Peng Hsien-yin (semifinals)
3. (Chinese Taipei) Huang Liang-chi / (Chinese Taipei) Yi Chu-huan (quarterfinals)
4. (Thailand) Weerapat Doakmaiklee / (Chinese Taipei) Yang Tsung-hua (semifinals)

== Draw ==
Key

- Q = Qualifier
- WC = Wild card
- LL = Lucky loser
- Alt = Alternate
- ITF = ITF entry
- PR = Protected ranking
- SR = Special ranking
- SE = Special exempt
- JE = Junior exempt
- JR = Junior Accelerator Programme entrant
- CO = College Accelerator Programme entrant
- NG = Next Gen Accelerator Program entrant
- w/o = Walkover
- r = Retired
- d = Defaulted

=== Draw ===
First round
1	(Thailand) Sa Ratiwatana (Thailand) So Ratiwatana	6	6
WC	(China) Feng He (China) Wang Chuhan	1	1
(Australia) B Mitchell (Australia) M Reid	6	6
(Japan) H Moriya (Chinese Taipei) J Wang	1	1
4	(Thailand) W Doakmaiklee (Chinese Taipei) T-h Yang	6	6
(Australia) J Millman (Japan) Y Uchiyama	2	3
(Australia) G Jones (Japan) H Kondo
(Chinese Taipei) T Chen (Slovakia) Norbert Gomboš	w/o
WC	(China) Qi Xiao (China) Zhou Zhuo-Qing
(China) M Gong (China) Z Zhang	w/o
WC	(South Korea) S-Y Jeong (South Korea) Y-K Lim	4	4
3	(Chinese Taipei) L-c Huang (Chinese Taipei) C-h Yi	6	6
(Germany) P Gojowczyk (Germany) K Krawietz	6	3	[13]
(Japan) T Matsui (China) D Wu	2	6	[11]
(China) Gao Xin (China) Li Zhe	3	4
2	(Chinese Taipei) H-h Lee (Chinese Taipei) H-y Peng	6	6

Quarterfinals
1	(Thailand) Sa Ratiwatana (Thailand) So Ratiwatana	6	6
(Australia) B Mitchell (Australia) M Reid	1	0
4	(Thailand) W Doakmaiklee (Chinese Taipei) T-h Yang	6	6
(Chinese Taipei) T Chen (Slovakia) Norbert Gomboš	2	2
(China) M Gong (China) Z Zhang	7^{7}	5	[12]
3	(Chinese Taipei) L-c Huang (Chinese Taipei) C-h Yi	6^{5}	7	[10]
(Germany) P Gojowczyk (Germany) K Krawietz	0	1
2	(Chinese Taipei) H-h Lee (Chinese Taipei) H-y Peng	6	6

Semifinals
1	(Thailand) Sa Ratiwatana (Thailand) So Ratiwatana	6	7^{7}
4	(Thailand) W Doakmaiklee (Chinese Taipei) T-h Yang	2	6^{4}
(China) M Gong (China) Z Zhang	7^{7}	6
2	(Chinese Taipei) H-h Lee (Chinese Taipei) H-y Peng	6^{4}	3

Final
1	(Thailand) Sa Ratiwatana (Thailand) So Ratiwatana	6	6
(China) M Gong (China) Z Zhang	4	2
