= 2012 Ningbo Challenger – Men's singles =

Men's singles
- 2012 Ningbo Challenger

Final
- Champion: (Germany) Peter Gojowczyk
- Runner-up: (South Korea) Jeong Suk-Young
- Score: 6–3, 6–1

Events
| Singles | men | women |
| Doubles | men | women |
- Ningbo Challenger

Lu Yen-hsun was the defending champion.
Peter Gojowczyk won the title, defeating Suk-Young Jeong 6–3, 6–1 in the final.

== Seeds ==
1. (Chinese Taipei) Lu Yen-hsun (quarterfinals, retired because of a wrist injury)
2. (China) Zhang Ze (quarterfinals)
3. (Chinese Taipei) Jimmy Wang (first round)
4. (China) Wu Di (semifinals)
5. (Chinese Taipei) Yang Tsung-hua (first round)
6. (United States) Michael Yani (withdrew because of a hamstring injury)
7. (Japan) Hiroki Moriya (second round)
8. (Chinese Taipei) Chen Ti (semifinals)

== Draw ==
Key

- Q = Qualifier
- WC = Wild card
- LL = Lucky loser
- Alt = Alternate
- ITF = ITF entry
- PR = Protected ranking
- SR = Special ranking
- SE = Special exempt
- JE = Junior exempt
- JR = Junior Accelerator Programme entrant
- CO = College Accelerator Programme entrant
- NG = Next Gen Accelerator Program entrant
- w/o = Walkover
- r = Retired
- d = Defaulted

=== Finals ===
Semifinals
(Germany) Peter Gojowczyk | 6 | 6
8 | (Chinese Taipei) Ti Chen | 3 | 2
4 | (China) Di Wu | 5 | 4
Q | (South Korea) Jeong Suk-Young | 7 | 6

Final
(Germany) Peter Gojowczyk | 6 | 6
Q | (South Korea) Jeong Suk-Young | 3 | 1

=== Top half ===
First round
1 | (Chinese Taipei) Y-h Lu | 4 | 6 | 7^{7}
(Slovakia) Norbert Gomboš | 6 | 3 | 6^{2}
WC | (China) Zhou Zhuo-Qing | 6 | 1^{r}
WC | (China) Wang Chuhan | 4 | 6
(Australia) G Jones | 1 | 2^{r}
(Germany) P Gojowczyk | 6 | 1
(Germany) K Krawietz | 3 | 3
7 | (Japan) Hiroki Moriya | 6 | 6
3 | (Chinese Taipei) J Wang | 6^{4} | 6 | 4
(China) Li Zhe | 7^{7} | 4 | 6
(Switzerland) S Bohli | 7 | 1 | 6
(Japan) T Matsui | 5 | 6 | 1
(Australia) Matt Reid | 7^{7} | 7^{7}
(India) Vijayant Malik | 6^{2} | 6^{1}
(China) Chang Yu | 1 | 6^{4}
8 | (Chinese Taipei) T Chen | 6 | 7^{7}

Second round
1 | (Chinese Taipei) Y-h Lu | 6 | 6
WC | (China) C Wang | 2 | 1
(Germany) P Gojowczyk | 7^{7} | 1 | 6
7 | (Japan) H Moriya | 6^{4} | 6 | 4
(China) Z Li | 3 | 6^{2}
(Switzerland) S Bohli | 6 | 7^{7}
(Australia) M Reid | 7 | 3 | 2
8 | (Chinese Taipei) T Chen | 5 | 6 | 6

Quarterfinals
1 | (Chinese Taipei) Y-h Lu | 0^{r}
(Germany) P Gojowczyk | 4
(Switzerland) S Bohli | 2 | 6 | 6^{5}
8 | (Chinese Taipei) T Chen | 6 | 3 | 7^{7}

Semifinals
(Germany) P Gojowczyk | 6 | 6
8 | (Chinese Taipei) T Chen | 3 | 2

=== Bottom half ===
First round
LL | (South Korea) Yong-Kyu Lim | 6 | 6
(Japan) Yasutaka Uchiyama | 3 | 4
Q | (Chinese Taipei) Yi Chu-huan | 6 | 6
WC | (China) Gao Xin | 3 | 0
WC | (China) M Gong | 6 | 3 | 6
(Australia) B Mitchell | 4 | 6 | 4
Q | (China) Wang Ruikai | 3 | 1
4 | (China) D Wu | 6 | 6
5 | (Chinese Taipei) T-h Yang | 5 | 6 | 2
Q | (South Korea) S-Y Jeong | 7 | 3 | 6
(Chinese Taipei) Huang Liang-chi | 6^{5} | 2
Q | (Germany) Jaan-Frederik Brunken | 7^{7} | 6
(Australia) J Millman | 6 | 6
(Japan) H Kondo | 4 | 0
(Germany) Stefan Seifert | 2 | 4
2 | (China) Z Zhang | 6 | 6

Second round
LL | (South Korea) Yong-Kyu Lim | 6 | 5 | 5
Q | (Chinese Taipei) Yi Chu-huan | 3 | 7 | 7
WC | (China) M Gong | 6 | 1 | 4
4 | (China) D Wu | 2 | 6 | 6
Q | (South Korea) S-Y Jeong | 6 | 6
Q | (Germany) J-F Brunken | 4 | 4
(Australia) J Millman | 6 | 6^{8} | 2
2 | (China) Z Zhang | 1 | 7^{10} | 6

Quarterfinals
Q | (Chinese Taipei) Yi Chu-huan | 4 | 4
4 | (China) D Wu | 6 | 6
Q | (South Korea) S-Y Jeong | 6 | 6
2 | (China) Z Zhang | 1 | 4

Semifinals
4 | (China) D Wu | 5 | 4
Q | (South Korea) S-Y Jeong | 7 | 6
