= 2017 Ningbo Challenger =

- Date: 16–22 October
- Edition: 5th
- Surface: Hard
- Location: Ningbo, China

Champions

Singles
- (Russia) Mikhail Youzhny

Doubles
- (Moldova) Radu Albot / (New Zealand) Jose Statham
- Ningbo Challenger

The 2017 Ningbo Challenger was a professional tennis tournament played on hard courts. It was the fifth edition of the tournament and part of the 2017 ATP Challenger Tour. It took place in Ningbo, China.

== Singles entrants ==
=== Seeds ===
Country	Player	Rank^{1}	Seed
TPE	Lu Yen-hsun	61	1
AUS	Jordan Thompson	72	2
USA	Taylor Fritz	87	3
MDA	Radu Albot	112	4
CHI	Nicolás Jarry	114	5
JPN	Taro Daniel	116	6
RUS	Mikhail Youzhny	120	7
CAN	Peter Polansky	123	8

- ^{1} Rankings are as of 9 October 2017.

=== Other entrants ===
The following players received wildcards into the singles main draw:

- (China) Gao Xin
- (China) Sun Fajing
- (China) Te Rigele
- (China) Wu Yibing

The following players received entry from the qualifying draw:

- (South Korea) Chung Yun-seong
- (Australia) Marinko Matosevic
- (Austria) Jurij Rodionov
- (Japan) Yosuke Watanuki

== Champions ==
=== Singles ===
- (Russia) Mikhail Youzhny def. (Japan) Taro Daniel 6–1, 6–1.

=== Doubles ===
- (Moldova) Radu Albot / (New Zealand) Jose Statham def. (India) Jeevan Nedunchezhiyan / (Indonesia) Christopher Rungkat 7–5, 6–3.
