= Hsieh Cheng-peng =

Taiwanese tennis player

Hsieh Cheng-peng 謝政鵬
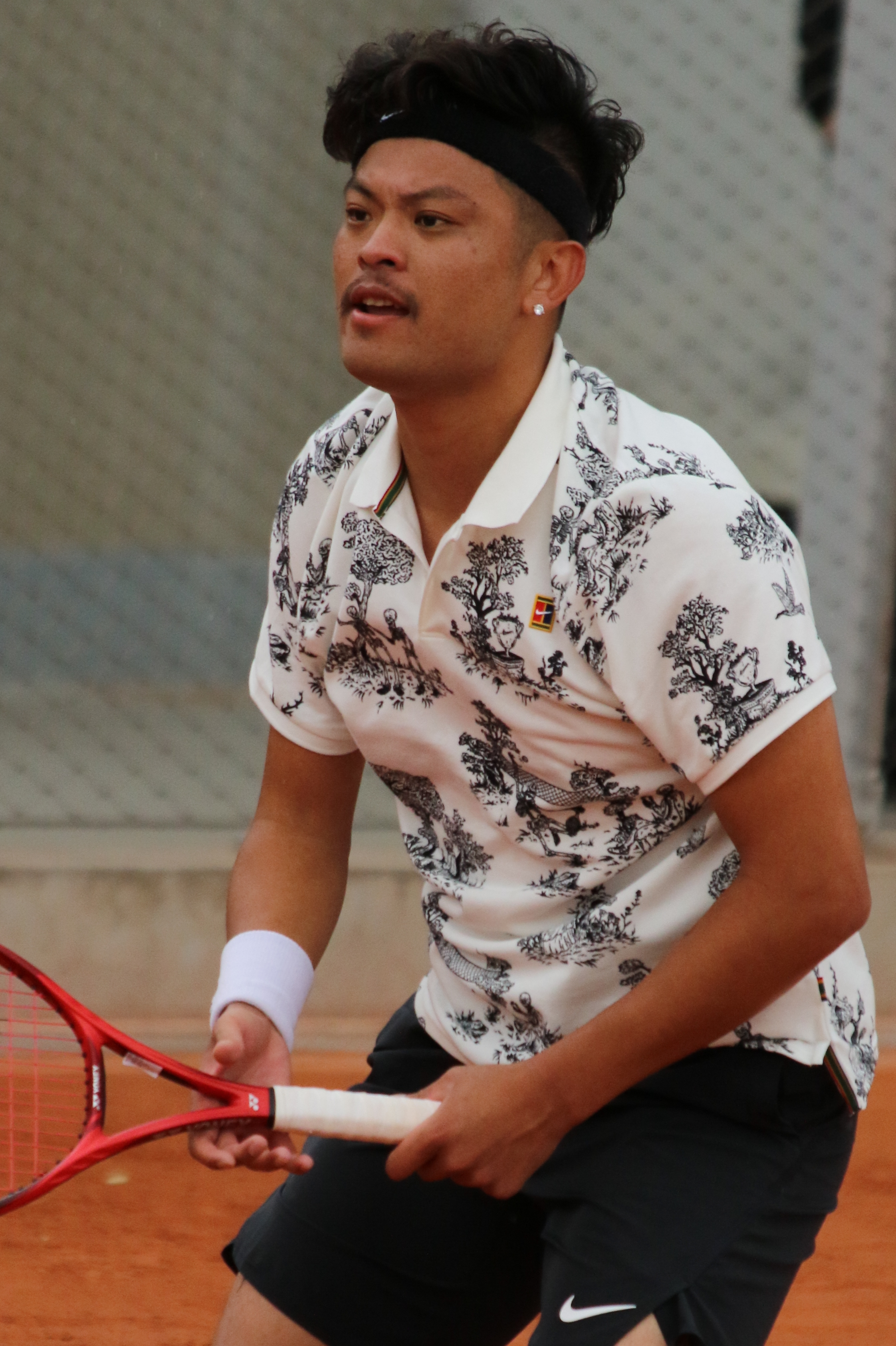
- Hsieh at the 2019 French Open
- Country (sports): Chinese Taipei
- Residence: Taiwan
- Born: 22 September 1991 (age 35) Taiwan
- Height: 1.83 m (6 ft 0 in)
- Turned pro: 2010
- Plays: Left-handed (two-handed backhand)
- Prize money: US $251,845

Singles
- Career record: 0–0
- Career titles: 0
- Highest ranking: No. 1098 (18 July 2011)

Doubles
- Career record: 8–26
- Career titles: 0; 20 Challenger, 16 Futures
- Highest ranking: No. 62 (10 June 2019)
- Current ranking: No. 364 (10 August 2026)

Grand Slam doubles results
- Australian Open: 1R (2016, 2017, 2020)
- French Open: 2R (2019)
- Wimbledon: 1R (2017)
- US Open: 1R (2019)

Grand Slam mixed doubles results
- Wimbledon: 2R (2019)
- US Open: 1R (2019)
- Last updated on: 21 August 2026.

Hsieh Cheng-peng
Medal record

Men's Tennis

Representing Chinese Taipei

Summer Universiade
Gold medal – first place	2017 Taipei	Men's Team
Gold medal – first place	2011 Shenzhen	Men's Doubles
Bronze medal – third place	2017 Taipei	Mixed Doubles
Bronze medal – third place	2011 Shenzhen	Men's Team

Hsieh Cheng-peng
- Traditional Chinese: 謝政鵬
- Simplified Chinese: 谢政鹏
Transcriptions
Standard Mandarin
- Hanyu Pinyin: Xiè Zhèngpéng

Hsieh Cheng-peng (Chinese: 謝政鵬; born 22 September 1991) is a tennis player from Taiwan. He reached a career-high doubles ranking of world No. 62 on 10 June 2019. He reached the final at the 2019 Sofia Open with partner Christopher Rungkat.

Alongside Yang Tsung-hua he won the 2008 Wimbledon as well as the 2008 Australian Open Junior titles. He also won the 2009 US Open with Márton Fucsovics, and the 2009 Australian Open Junior title with Francis Casey Alcantara.

He is the brother of tennis players Hsieh Su-wei and Hsieh Yu-chieh.

== Tennis career ==
=== Juniors ===
In 2008 Hsieh won the 2008 Wimbledon Championships – Boys' doubles alongside Yang Tsung-hua. In 2009 he won the Australian Open Boys' Doubles alongside Francis Casey Alcantara and the US Open Boys' Doubles together with Hungarian Márton Fucsovics. Hsieh compiled a doubles win–loss record of 124–33 (69-44 in singles) and reached a career-high of No. 8 in the ITF Junior combined world rankings in April 2009.

Junior Slam results – Singles:

- Australian Open: QF (2009)
- French Open: 1R (2009)
- Wimbledon: 2R (2009)
- US Open: 1R (2008, 2009)

Junior Slam results – Doubles:

- Australian Open: W (2008, 2009)
- French Open: QF (2008)
- Wimbledon: W (2008)
- US Open: W (2009)

=== Pro tour ===
Hsieh has won 20 Challenger titles in doubles.

== ATP career finals ==
=== Doubles: 1 runner-up ===
Legend Grand Slam tournaments (0–0) ATP World Tour Masters 1000 (0–0) ATP World Tour 500 Series (0–0) ATP World Tour 250 Series (0–1)	Finals by surface Hard (0–1) Clay (0–0) Grass (0–0)	Finals by setting Outdoor (0–0) Indoor (0–1)

Result	Date	Tournament	Tier	Surface	Partner	Opponents	Score
Loss	Feb 2019	Sofia Open, Bulgaria	250 Series	Hard	(Indonesia) Christopher Rungkat	(Croatia) Nikola Mektić (Austria) Jürgen Melzer	2–6, 6–4, [2–10]

== Challenger and Futures finals ==
=== Doubles: 61 (38–23) ===
Legend ATP Challenger Tour (20–17) ITF Futures Tour / World Tennis Tour (18–6)	Finals by surface Hard (34–17) Clay (2–4) Grass (0–1) Carpet (2–1)

Result	W–L	Date	Tournament	Tier	Surface	Partner	Opponents	Score
Win	1–0	Jun 2010	Japan F6, Kusatsu	Futures	Carpet	(Chinese Taipei) Chen I-Ta	(Japan) Yuichi Ito (Chinese Taipei) Lee Hsin-han	6–4, 7–5
Win	2–0	May 2011	China F5, Nanjing	Futures	Hard (i)	(Chinese Taipei) Lee Hsin-han	(Japan) Junn Mitsuhashi (Japan) Bumpei Sato	6–2, 6–4
Win	3–0	May 2011	China F6, Guiyang	Futures	Hard (i)	(Chinese Taipei) Lee Hsin-han	(Chinese Taipei) Huang Liang-chi (China) Ouyang Bowen	6–4, 7–6^{(7–3)}
Win	4–0	May 2011	Indonesia F1, Jakarta	Futures	Hard	(Chinese Taipei) Lee Hsin-han	(Japan) Yuichi Ito (Japan) Kento Takeuchi	7–6^{(7–5)}, 7–6^{(7–4)}
Loss	4–1	Jun 2011	Japan F6, Kashiwa	Futures	Hard	(Chinese Taipei) Lee Hsin-han	(Indonesia) Christopher Rungkat (Chinese Taipei) Yi Chu-huan	6–7^{(2–7)}, 3–6
Loss	4–2	Jun 2011	Japan F7, Akishima	Futures	Grass	(Chinese Taipei) Lee Hsin-han	(Indonesia) Christopher Rungkat (Chinese Taipei) Yi Chu-huan	4–6, 3–6
Win	5–2	Jul 2011	Japan F8, Sapporo	Futures	Clay	(Chinese Taipei) Lee Hsin-han	(Japan) Bumpei Sato (Thailand) Kittiphong Wachiramanowong	6–4, 3–6, [10–7]
Win	6–2	Jul 2011	Chinese Taipei F1, Taipei	Futures	Hard	(Chinese Taipei) Lee Hsin-han	(Japan) Yuichi Ito (Chinese Taipei) Yi Chu-huan	6–3, 6–2
Win	7–2	Jul 2011	Chinese Taipei F2, Taipei	Futures	Hard	(Chinese Taipei) Lee Hsin-han	(Chinese Taipei) Huang Liang-chi (South Korea) Jeong Suk-young	1–6, 6–3, [10–5]
Loss	7–3	Oct 2011	Naples, Italy	Challenger	Clay	(Chinese Taipei) Lee Hsin-han	(Kazakhstan) Yuri Schukin (Croatia) Antonio Veić	7–6^{(7–5)}, 5–7, [8–10]
Win	8–3	Jan 2012	China F2, Shenzhen	Futures	Hard	(Chinese Taipei) Lee Hsin-han	(United States) Devin Britton (United States) Austin Krajicek	7–6^{(7–5)}, 6–0
Loss	8–4	Mar 2012	Singapore, Singapore	Challenger	Hard	(Chinese Taipei) Lee Hsin-han	(Slovakia) Kamil Čapkovič (Israel) Amir Weintraub	4–6, 4–6
Loss	8–5	Mar 2012	Kyoto, Japan	Challenger	Carpet (i)	(Chinese Taipei) Lee Hsin-han	(Thailand) Sanchai Ratiwatana (Thailand) Sonchat Ratiwatana	6–7^{(7–9)}, 3–6
Win	9–5	Apr 2012	Chinese Taipei F1, Kaohsiung	Futures	Hard	(Chinese Taipei) Lee Hsin-han	(Russia) Denis Matsukevitch (Thailand) Danai Udomchoke	5–7, 6–1, [10–8]
Loss	9–6	May 2012	Busan, South Korea	Challenger	Hard	(Chinese Taipei) Lee Hsin-han	(India) Yuki Bhambri (India) Divij Sharan	6–1, 1–6, [5–10]
Win	10–6	Jun 2012	Prostějov, Czech Republic	Challenger	Clay	(Chinese Taipei) Lee Hsin-han	(Australia) Colin Ebelthite (Australia) John Peers	7–5, 7–5
Loss	10–7	Sep 2013	Chinese Taipei F2, Taipei	Futures	Hard	(Chinese Taipei) Chen I-Ta	(Japan) Takuto Niki (Japan) Arata Onozawa	4–6, 4–6
Win	11–7	Feb 2015	Hong Kong, Hong Kong	Challenger	Hard	(Chinese Taipei) Yi Chu-huan	(India) Saketh Myneni (India) Sanam Singh	6–4, 6–2
Win	12–7	Jun 2015	Hong Kong F1, Hong Kong	Futures	Hard	(Hong Kong) Yeung Pak-long	(China) He Yecong (Chinese Taipei) Yi Chu-huan	4–6, 6–4, [10–5]
Win	13–7	Jun 2015	Hong Kong F3, Hong Kong	Futures	Hard	(Chinese Taipei) Yi Chu-huan	(Chinese Taipei) Hung Jui-chen (Chinese Taipei) Wang Chieh-fu	6–3, 6–7^{(6–8)}, [10–7]
Win	14–7	Jul 2015	China F11, Xi'an	Futures	Hard	(China) Bai Yan	(India) Sriram Balaji (China) Li Zhe	6–7^{(4–7)}, 6–3, [10–7]
Win	15–7	Aug 2015	China F12, Fuzhou	Futures	Hard	(Chinese Taipei) Yang Tsung-hua	(Japan) Yuya Kibi (Japan) Arata Onozawa	6–3, 7–5
Win	16–7	Aug 2015	Chinese Taipei F1, Kaohsiung	Futures	Hard	(Chinese Taipei) Yang Tsung-hua	(China) Bai Yan (Chinese Taipei) Yi Chu-huan	6–4, 7–6^{(7–5)}
Win	17–7	Sep 2015	Kaohsiung, Chinese Taipei	Challenger	Hard	(Chinese Taipei) Yang Tsung-hua	(China) Gong Maoxin (Chinese Taipei) Peng Hsien-yin	6–2, 6–2
Loss	17–8	Mar 2016	Zhuhai, China	Challenger	Hard	(China) Wu Di	(China) Gong Maoxin (Chinese Taipei) Yi Chu-huan	6–2, 1–6, [5–10]
Win	18–8	Apr 2016	China F4, Zhangjiagang	Futures	Hard	(Chinese Taipei) Peng Hsien-yin	(India) Sriram Balaji (Japan) Shuichi Sekiguchi	7–6^{(7–4)}, 6–3
Win	19–8	May 2016	Taipei, Chinese Taipei	Challenger	Carpet (i)	(Chinese Taipei) Yang Tsung-hua	(Denmark) Frederik Nielsen (Republic of Ireland) David O'Hare	7–6^{(8–6)}, 6–4
Loss	19–9	May 2016	Samarkand, Uzbekistan	Challenger	Clay	(Chinese Taipei) Yang Tsung-hua	(Russia) Denis Matsukevitch (Belarus) Andrei Vasilevski	4–6, 7–5, [5–10]
Win	20–9	Jul 2016	Gimcheon, South Korea	Challenger	Hard	(Chinese Taipei) Yang Tsung-hua	(Colombia) Nicolás Barrientos (Philippines) Ruben Gonzales	w/o
Win	21–9	Sep 2016	Shanghai, China	Challenger	Hard	(Chinese Taipei) Yi Chu-huan	(China) Gao Xin (China) Li Zhe	7–6^{(8–6)}, 5–7, [10–0]
Loss	21–10	Sep 2016	Kaohsiung, Chinese Taipei	Challenger	Hard	(Chinese Taipei) Yi Chu-huan	(Thailand) Sanchai Ratiwatana (Thailand) Sonchat Ratiwatana	4–6, 6–7^{(4–7)}
Win	22–10	Dec 2016	Hong Kong F4, Hong Kong	Futures	Hard	(Hong Kong) Yeung Pak-long	(Hong Kong) Karan Rastogi (Hong Kong) Wong Hong-kit	5–7, 6–3, [10–4]
Loss	22–11	Mar 2017	Shenzhen, China	Challenger	Hard	(Indonesia) Christopher Rungkat	(Thailand) Sanchai Ratiwatana (Thailand) Sonchat Ratiwatana	2–6, 7–6^{(7–5)}, [6–10]
Win	23–11	Mar 2017	Quanzhou, China	Challenger	Hard	(Chinese Taipei) Peng Hsien-yin	(Germany) Andre Begemann (Belarus) Aliaksandr Bury	3–6, 6–4, [10–7]
Win	24–11	May 2017	Seoul, South Korea	Challenger	Hard	(Chinese Taipei) Peng Hsien-yin	(Italy) Thomas Fabbiano (Israel) Dudi Sela	5–1 ret.
Win	25–11	May 2017	Busan, South Korea	Challenger	Hard	(Chinese Taipei) Peng Hsien-yin	(Thailand) Sanchai Ratiwatana (Thailand) Sonchat Ratiwatana	7–5, 4–6, [10–8]
Loss	25–12	Aug 2017	Chengdu, China	Challenger	Hard	(Chinese Taipei) Peng Hsien-yin	(India) Sriram Balaji (India) Vishnu Vardhan	3–6, 4–6
Win	26–12	Aug 2017	Jinan, China	Challenger	Hard	(Chinese Taipei) Peng Hsien-yin	(India) Sriram Balaji (India) Vishnu Vardhan	4–6, 6–4, [10–4]
Win	27–12	Mar 2018	Shenzhen, China	Challenger	Hard	(Australia) Rameez Junaid	(Ukraine) Denys Molchanov (Slovakia) Igor Zelenay	7–6^{(7–3)}, 6–3
Win	28–12	May 2018	Busan, South Korea	Challenger	Hard	(Indonesia) Christopher Rungkat	(South Africa) Ruan Roelofse (Austria) John-Patrick Smith	6–4, 6–3
Loss	28–13	Jun 2018	Lyon, France	Challenger	Clay	(Switzerland) Luca Margaroli	(France) Elliot Benchetrit (France) Geoffrey Blancaneaux	3–6, 6–4, [7–10]
Loss	28–14	Jun 2018	Blois, France	Challenger	Clay	(Australia) Rameez Junaid	(Brazil) Fabrício Neis (Spain) David Vega Hernández	6–7^{(4–7)}, 1–6
Win	29–14	Aug 2018	Jinan, China	Challenger	Hard	(Chinese Taipei) Yang Tsung-hua	(Kazakhstan) Alexander Bublik (Russia) Alexander Pavlioutchenkov	7–6^{(7–5)}, 4–6, [10–5]
Win	30–14	Sep 2018	Kaohsiung, Chinese Taipei	Challenger	Hard (i)	(Chinese Taipei) Yang Tsung-hua	(Chinese Taipei) Hsu Yu-hsiou (Chinese Taipei) Jimmy Wang	6–7^{(3–7)}, 6–2, [10–8]
Loss	30–15	Oct 2018	Ningbo, China	Challenger	Hard	(Indonesia) Christopher Rungkat	(China) Gong Maoxin (China) Zhang Ze	5–7, 6–2, [5–10]
Loss	30–16	Oct 2018	Liuzhou, China	Challenger	Hard	(Indonesia) Christopher Rungkat	(China) Gong Maoxin (China) Zhang Ze	3–6, 6–2, [3–10]
Win	31–16	Nov 2018	Shenzhen, China	Challenger	Hard	(Indonesia) Christopher Rungkat	(India) Jeevan Nedunchezhiyan (India) Sriram Balaji	6–4, 6–2
Loss	31–17	Nov 2018	Pune, India	Challenger	Hard	(Chinese Taipei) Yang Tsung-hua	(India) Vijay Sundar Prashanth (India) Ramkumar Ramanathan	6–7^{(3–7)}, 7–6^{(7–5)}, [7–10]
Win	32–17	Jan 2019	Danang, Vietnam	Challenger	Hard	(Indonesia) Christopher Rungkat	(India) Leander Paes (Mexico) Miguel Ángel Reyes-Varela	6–3, 2–6, [11–9]
Loss	32–18	Feb 2019	Bangkok, Thailand	Challenger	Hard	(Indonesia) Christopher Rungkat	(China) Gong Maoxin (China) Zhang Ze	4–6, 4–6
Win	33–18	Mar 2019	Shenzhen, China, P.R.	Challenger	Hard	(Indonesia) Christopher Rungkat	(China) Li Zhe (Portugal) Gonçalo Oliveira	6–4, 3–6, [10–6]
Win	34–18	May 2019	Busan, South Korea	Challenger	Hard	(Indonesia) Christopher Rungkat	(Japan) Toshihide Matsui (India) Vishnu Vardhan	7–6^{(9–7)}, 6–1
Win	35–18	May 2019	Gwangju, South Korea	Challenger	Hard	(Indonesia) Christopher Rungkat	(South Korea) Nam Ji-sung (South Korea) Song Min-kyu	6–3, 3–6, [10–6]
Win	36–18	Nov 2019	Shenzhen, China	Challenger	Hard	(Chinese Taipei) Yang Tsung-Hua	(Russia) Mikhail Elgin (India) Ramkumar Ramanathan	6–2, 7-5
Loss	36–19	Jan 2026	Nonthaburi, Thailand	Challenger	Hard	(Chinese Taipei) Huang Tsung-hao	(Israel) Daniel Cukierman (Austria) Joel Schwärzler	3–6, 1–6
Loss	36–20	Mar 2026	M15 Maanshan, China	World Tennis Tour	Hard (i)	(South Korea) Park Ui-sung	(United States) Andre Ilagan (United States) Evan Zhu	3–6, 3–6
Win	37–20	Mar 2026	M15 Maanshan, China	World Tennis Tour	Hard (i)	(Australia) Chase Ferguson	(Thailand) Thantub Suksumrarn (United States) Michael Zhu	6–1, 6–4
Loss	37–21	Jun 2026	M15 Wuning, China	World Tennis Tour	Hard	(Philippines) Francis Alcantara	(Australia) Max Purcell (China) Zhao Zhao	7–6^{(8–6)}, 3–6, [5–10]
Loss	37–22	Jul 2026	M15 Wuning, China	World Tennis Tour	Hard	(Chinese Taipei) Lai Chin-kuan	(Indonesia) Muhammad Rifqi Fitriadi (Armenia) Daniil Sarksian	7–6^{(7–3)}, 6–7^{(5–7)}, [10–12]
Win	38–22	Aug 2026	M15 Tianjin, China	World Tennis Tour	Hard	(South Korea) Chung Yun-seong	(Australia) Omar Jasika (South Korea) Lee Duck-hee	6–4, 6–4
Loss	38–23	Oct 2026	Ningbo, China	Challenger	Hard	(Japan) Kaichi Uchida	(Japan) Akira Santillan (China) Zheng Baoluo	3–6, 5–7
