= Prajnesh Gunneswaran =

Indian tennis player

- Country (sports): India
- Residence: Chennai, India
- Born: 12 November 1989 (age 36) Chennai, Tamil Nadu, India
- Height: 1.88 m (6 ft 2 in)
- Turned pro: 2010
- Retired: 2024
- Plays: Left-handed (two–handed backhand)
- Coach: Bastian Suwanprateeep
- Prize money: $888,338

Singles
- Career record: 11–28
- Career titles: 0
- Highest ranking: No. 75 (22 April 2019)

Grand Slam singles results
- Australian Open: 1R (2019, 2020)
- French Open: 1R (2019)
- Wimbledon: 1R (2019)
- US Open: 1R (2019)

Doubles
- Career record: 1–1
- Career titles: 0
- Highest ranking: No. 248 (24 December 2018)
Medal record
Men's tennis
Representing India
Asian Games
Bronze medal – third place	2018 Jakarta-Palembang	Singles
- Last updated on: 13 September 2021.

Prajnesh Gunneswaran (born 12 November 1989) is an Indian former professional tennis player. He reached a career high ATP singles ranking of No. 75 in 2019. He won 2 ATP Challenger and 8 ITF titles in singles and 1 ITF title in doubles. He represented India at the Davis Cup. At the 2018 Asian Games in Jakarta, he won the bronze medal in the men's singles event.

== Personal life ==
Prajnesh Gunneswaran is the son of Mr. S G Prabhakharan and Mrs. Usha. He married Sudarshana Pai in Ernakulam, Kerala in 2019.

== Career ==
=== 2010–2017: Early career ===
Gunneswaran mainly participated in ITF and ATP Challenger events in his early years. While he won eight ITF Futures singles titles, he found limited success on the Challenger tour.

In October 2016, he reached his first ATP Challenger singles final at Pune Challenger. He lost the title match to Frenchman Sadio Doumbia. In May 2017, he reached his first ATP Challenger doubles final at 2017 Samarkand Challenger. Partnering with compatriot Vishnu Vardhan, the pair lost the final to team of Laurynas Grigelis and Zdeněk Kolář.

Gunneswaran made his Davis Cup debut for India against Uzbekistan in April 2017.

=== 2018: Two ATP Challenger titles, Asian games Bronze Medal, Indian No. 1 ===
2018 proved to be breakthrough year for Gunneswaran. He reached four ATP Challenger singles finals, winning two of them. He won his first ATP Challenger singles title at the Kunming Open by defeating Mohamed Safwat in the final. In an all-Indian final, he defeated Saketh Myneni at Bengaluru Open to lift his second Challenger singles trophy. He finished as runner-up at the Ningbo Challenger and Pune Challenger. In April he also reached his second ATP Challenger doubles final at Santaizi ATP Challenger in Taipei, where he partnered with Saketh Myneni.

At French Open, Gunneswaran lost in the final qualifying round. Although he was chosen as lucky loser after Nick Kyrgios withdrew from the competition, Gunneswaran could not participate in the main draw event as he had already left Paris before Kyrgios announced his withdrawal, thus failing to debut in the main draw of a Grand Slam event.

In August, he won the bronze medal in the men's singles tennis event at the 2018 Asian Games in Jakarta. He became the sixth Indian male athlete to win a medal in tennis at the Asian Games.

Gunneswaran started the season as World No. 243 in singles ranking. With solid performance on the Challenger tour he finished the season on a career-high ranking of No. 104 and became the highest ranked Indian singles player.

=== 2019: Grand Slam main draw & top 100 debuts ===
Gunneswaran started the season by entering the Maharashtra Open, where he received a wildcard into the main draw. He lost in the first round to Michael Mmoh in straight sets.

At the Australian Open, he won the qualifying competition and debuted in the main draw of a Grand Slam event. He lost in the first round in straight sets to Frances Tiafoe.

On 11 February 2019, he reached a career-high singles ranking of No. 97, debuting in the top 100 singles rankings.

Gunneswaran came through the qualifying of the 2019 BNP Paribas Open and defeated Frenchman Benoit Paire in straight sets to enter the second round. He won his second round match against the 17th seed Nikoloz Basilashvili in three sets to make the third round of an ATP 1000 Tournament for the first time in his career. Gunneswaran's run at the Indian Wells Masters came to an end following a straight set defeat to Ivo Karlovic in the third round. This was Gunneswaran's maiden appearance at an ATP Masters event. Next, he qualified for the Miami Open, a back-to-back main draw appearance at a Masters event. He lost in the opening round to Jaume Munar.

In April, Gunneswaran reached his season's first ATP Challenger singles final at the Anning Challenger. He was the defending champion and lost to British player Jay Clarke in the final. As a result, he rose to a career-high singles ranking of No. 75. In July his ranking automatically enabled him entry to the main draw at Wimbledon, where he lost in the first round to Milos Raonic.

He lost to Daniil Medvedev at the 2019 US Open in the first round.

=== 2024: Retirement ===
In November 2024, Gunneswaran announced his retirement from professional tennis.

== Challenger and Futures finals ==
=== Singles: 27 (11–16) ===
Legend (singles) ATP Challenger Tour (2–7) ITF Futures Tour (9–9)	Titles by surface Hard (7–14) Clay (4–2) Grass (0–0) Carpet (0–0)

Result	W–L	Date	Tournament	Tier	Surface	Opponent	Score
Win	1–0	Jun 2013	India F6, Chennai	Futures	Hard	(India) Vijayant Malik	7–6^{(7–5)}, 6–3
Win	2–0	Jul 2013	Denmark F2, Aarhus	Futures	Clay	(Netherlands) Colin van Beem	6–3, 4–6, 6–0
Loss	2–1	Sep 2013	Egypt F26, Sharm El Sheikh	Futures	Clay	(Spain) Enrique López Pérez	0–6, 0–6
Loss	2–2	Sep 2015	India F12, Chennai	Futures	Hard	(India) Jeevan Nedunchezhiyan	6–7^{(8–10)}, 4–6
Loss	2–3	Nov 2015	India F16, Gwalior	Futures	Hard	(India) Ramkumar Ramanathan	3–6, 4–6
Win	3–3	Dec 2015	India F18, Jassowal	Futures	Hard	(India) Ronit Singh Bisht	6–4, 6–4
Loss	3–4	Dec 2015	India F19, Mumbai	Futures	Hard	(India) Ramkumar Ramanathan	3–6, 3–6
Loss	3–5	Mar 2016	Turkey F9, Antalya	Futures	Hard	(France) Yannick Jankovits	6–7^{(9–11)}, 6–4, 3–6
Win	4–5	Sep 2016	India F4, Chennai	Futures	Clay	(India) Sriram Balaji	3–6, 7–5, 7–6^{(7–3)}
Loss	4–6	Sep 2016	India F6, Coimbatore	Futures	Hard	(India) Sanam Singh	3–6, 6–3, 4–6
Loss	4–7	Oct 2016	Pune, India	Challenger	Hard	(France) Sadio Doumbia	6–4, 4–6, 3–6
Win	5–7	Mar 2017	India F4, Bhilai	Futures	Hard	(India) Sriram Balaji	6–4, 6–2
Loss	5–8	Mar 2017	India F5, Bangalore	Futures	Hard	(India) Sriram Balaji	6–2, 3–6, 4–6
Win	6–8	Mar 2017	India F6, Trivandrum	Futures	Clay	(India) Sriram Balaji	7–5, 6–3
Win	7–8	Jul 2017	China F10, Kunshan	Futures	Hard	(China) Li Zhe	6–3, 6–1
Loss	7–9	Jul 2017	China F11, Shenzhen	Futures	Hard	(China) Zhang Zhizhen	6–2, 5–7, 0–5 ret.
Loss	7–10	Dec 2017	Indonesia F8, Jakarta	Futures	Hard	(South Korea) Lee Duck-hee	3–6, 6–4, 6–7^{(6–8)}
Win	8–10	Mar 2018	India F3, Chandigarh	Futures	Hard	(Vietnam) Lý Hoàng Nam	6–3, 6–4
Win	9–10	Apr 2018	Anning, China, P.R.	Challenger	Clay	(Egypt) Mohamed Safwat	5–7, 6–3, 6–1
Loss	9–11	Oct 2018	Ningbo, China, P.R.	Challenger	Hard	(Italy) Thomas Fabbiano	6–7^{(4–7)}, 6–4, 3–6
Win	10–11	Nov 2018	Bangalore, India	Challenger	Hard	(India) Saketh Myneni	6–2, 6–2
Loss	10–12	Nov 2018	Pune, India	Challenger	Hard	(Sweden) Elias Ymer	2–6, 5–7
Loss	10–13	Apr 2019	Anning, China, P.R.	Challenger	Clay	(United Kingdom) Jay Clarke	4–6, 3–6
Loss	10–14	Nov 2020	Cary, United States	Challenger	Hard	(United States) Denis Kudla	6–3, 3–6, 0–6
Loss	10–15	Nov 2020	Orlando, United States	Challenger	Hard	(United States) Brandon Nakashima	3–6, 4–6
Loss	10–16	Mar 2022	Monterrey, Mexico	Challenger	Hard	(Spain) Fernando Verdasco	6–4, 3–6, 6–7^{(3–7)}
Win	11–16	Jan 2023	M25, Al Zahra, Kuwait	ITF	Hard	(Uzbekistan) Khumoyun Sultanov	6–2, 7–6^{(7–5)}

=== Doubles: 3 (1–2) ===
Legend (doubles) ATP Challenger Tour (0–2) ITF Futures Tour (1–0)	Titles by surface Hard (0–1) Clay (1–0) Grass (0–0) Carpet (0–1)

Result	W–L	Date	Tournament	Tier	Surface	Partner	Opponents	Score
Win	1–0	Sep 2013	Egypt F25, Sharm El Sheikh	Futures	Clay	(Egypt) Issam Haitham Taweel	(Italy) Filippo Borella (Russia) Aleksandr Ivanovich Spirin	6–3, 6–2
Loss	1–1	May 2017	Samarkand, Uzbekistan	Challenger	Hard	(India) Vishnu Vardhan	(Lithuania) Laurynas Grigelis (Czech Republic) Zdeněk Kolář	6–7^{(2–7)}, 3–6
Loss	1–2	Apr 2018	Taipei, Taiwan	Challenger	Carpet (i)	(India) Saketh Myneni	(Australia) Matthew Ebden (Australia) Andrew Whittington	4–6, 7–5, [6–10]

== Singles performance timeline ==
Key
W	F	SF	QF	#R	RR	Q#	P#	DNQ	A	Z#	PO	G	S	B	NMS	NTI	P	NH

(W) winner; (F) finalist; (SF) semifinalist; (QF) quarterfinalist; (#R) rounds 4, 3, 2, 1; (RR) round-robin stage; (Q#) qualification round; (P#) preliminary round; (DNQ) did not qualify; (A) absent; (Z#) Davis/Fed Cup Zonal Group (with number indication) or (PO) play-off; (G) gold, (S) silver or (B) bronze Olympic/Paralympic medal; (NMS) not a Masters tournament; (NTI) not a Tier I tournament; (P) postponed; (NH) not held; (SR) strike rate (events won / competed); (W–L) win–loss record.
To avoid confusion and double counting, these charts are updated at the conclusion of a tournament or when the player's participation has ended.

Current through the 2022 Maharashtra Open.

Tournament	2012	2013	2014	2015	2016	2017	2018	2019	2020	2021	2022	SR	W–L	Win %
Grand Slam tournaments
Australian Open	A	A	A	A	A	A	Q1	1R	1R	Q1	Q2	0 / 2	0–2	0%
French Open	A	A	A	A	A	A	Q3	1R	Q2	Q1		0 / 1	0–1	0%
Wimbledon	A	A	A	A	A	A	Q1	1R	NH	Q1		0 / 1	0–1	0%
US Open	A	A	A	A	A	Q1	A	1R	A	Q2		0 / 1	0–1	0%
Win–loss	0–0	0–0	0–0	0–0	0–0	0–0	0–0	0–4	0–1	0–0	0–0	0 / 5	0–5	0%
Year-end championships
ATP Finals	Did not qualify											0 / 0	0–0	–
ATP World Tour Masters 1000
Indian Wells Masters	A	A	A	A	A	A	A	3R	NH	A		0 / 1	2–1	67%
Miami Open	A	A	A	A	A	A	A	1R	NH	A		0 / 1	0–1	0%
Monte-Carlo Masters	A	A	A	A	A	A	A	A	NH	A		0 / 0	0–0	–
Madrid Open	A	A	A	A	A	A	A	A	NH	A		0 / 0	0–0	–
Italian Open	A	A	A	A	A	A	A	A	A	A		0 / 0	0–0	–
Canadian Open	A	A	A	A	A	A	A	A	NH	A		0 / 0	0–0	–
Cincinnati Masters	A	A	A	A	A	Q1	A	A	A	A		0 / 0	0–0	–
Shanghai Masters	A	A	A	A	A	A	A	A	NH			0 / 0	0–0	–
Paris Masters	A	A	A	A	A	A	A	A	A	A		0 / 0	0–0	–
Win–loss	0–0	0–0	0–0	0–0	0–0	0–0	0–0	2–2	0–0	0–0	0–0	0 / 2	2–2	50%
National representation
Summer Olympics	A	Not Held			A	Not Held				A		0 / 0	0–0	–
Davis Cup	A	A	A	A	A	Z1	PO	QR	QR	A		0 / 0	2–5	29%
Win–loss	0–0	0–0	0–0	0–0	0–0	1–1	1–1	0–21	0–1	1–1	0–0	0 / 0	3–6	33%
Career statistics
Titles / Finals	0 / 0	0 / 0	0 / 0	0 / 0	0 / 0	0 / 0	0 / 0	0 / 0	0 / 0	0 / 0	0 / 0	0 / 0		
Overall win–loss	0–0	0–0	0–0	0–0	0–0	1–1	2–5	5–14	1–4	1–2	0–1	10–27		28%
Year-end ranking	899	484	1400T	484	320	243	110	124	129	219	347	$701,151		

== Wins over top 20 players ==
Season	2019	Total
Wins	1	1

#	Player	Rank	Event	Surface	Rd	Score	PG Rank
2019
1.	(Georgia (country)) Nikoloz Basilashvili	18	Indian Wells Masters, USA	Hard	2nd	6–4, 6–7^{(6–8)}, 7–6^{(7–4)}	97
