= He Yecong =

Chinese tennis player

He Yecong 何叶聪
- Country (sports): China
- Born: 15 February 1994 (age 31) Hangzhou, China
- Height: 1.80 m (5 ft 11 in)
- Retired: 2020 (last match played)
- Plays: Right-handed (two-handed backhand)
- Prize money: $66,570

Singles
- Career record: 0–0 (at ATP Tour level, Grand Slam level, and in Davis Cup)
- Career titles: 0
- Highest ranking: No. 492 (27 June 2016)

Doubles
- Career record: 0–1 (at ATP Tour level, Grand Slam level, and in Davis Cup)
- Career titles: 0
- Highest ranking: No. 498 (21 August 2017)
- Last updated on: 15 April 2021.

He Yecong (Chinese: 何叶聪; pinyin: Hé Yècōng; Mandarin pronunciation: [xɤ̌ jê tsʰʊ́ŋ]; born 15 February 1994) is a Chinese former tennis player.

He has a career high ATP singles ranking of world No. 492 achieved on 27 June 2016. He also has a career high ATP doubles ranking of No. 498 achieved on 21 August 2017. He has won one singles title and has won two doubles tiles on the ITF Futures Tour.

He made his ATP main draw debut at the 2016 Chengdu Open, in the doubles draw partnering Sun Fajing.

== ATP Challenger and ITF Futures finals ==
=== Singles: 5 (1–4) ===
Legend ATP Challenger (0–0) ITF Futures (1–4)	Finals by surface Hard (1–4) Clay (0–0) Grass (0–0) Carpet (0–0)

Result	W–L	Date	Tournament	Tier	Surface	Opponent	Score
Loss	0–1	Jul 2015	China F11, Xi'an	Futures	Hard	(China) Li Zhe	1–6, 1–6
Loss	0–2	Jun 2016	Hong Kong F1	Futures	Hard	(Australia) Andrew Whittington	5–7, 3–6
Win	1–2	Jun 2017	Hong Kong F1	Futures	Hard	(Japan) Yuki Mochizuki	6–2, 6–2
Loss	1–3	May 2018	China F4, Wuhan	Futures	Hard	(China) Te Rigele	3–6, 6–7^{(4-7)}
Loss	1–4	Jun 2019	M25 Luzhou, China	World Tennis Tour	Hard	(China) Yan Bai	3–6, 2–6

=== Doubles: 5 (2–3) ===
Legend ATP Challenger (0–0) ITF Futures (2–3)	Finals by surface Hard (2–3) Clay (0–0) Grass (0–0) Carpet (0–0)

Result	W–L	Date	Tournament	Tier	Surface	Partner	Opponents	Score
Loss	0–1	Jun 2015	Hong Kong F1	Futures	Hard	(Chinese Taipei) Yi Chu-huan	(Chinese Taipei) Hsieh Cheng-peng (Hong Kong) Yeung Pak Long	6–4, 4–6, [5–10]
Loss	0–2	May 2016	China F7, Wuhan	Futures	Hard	(China) Wang Aoxiong	(Australia) Harry Bourchier (Japan) Akira Santillan	6–4, 2–6, [7–10]
Win	1–2	Jan 2017	Hong Kong F5	Futures	Hard	(China) Yan Bai	(Hong Kong) Karan Rastogi (Hong Kong) Chun Hun Wong	7–5, 6–4
Win	2–2	Apr 2017	China F5, Luzhou	Futures	Hard	(China) Zhang Zhizhen	(Chinese Taipei) Peng Hsien-yin (China) Xia Zihao	7–6^{(7-5)}, 6–3
Loss	2–3	Jul 2017	China F10, Kunshan	Futures	Hard	(China) Zhang Zhizhen	(China) Gao Xin (China) Zhe Li	3–6, 2–6
