= Ningbo International Tennis Open =

Ningbo Open
- 2026 Ningbo Open

Tournament information
- Founded: 2010; 16 years ago
- Location: Ningbo; China
- Venue: Ningbo Yinzhou Tennis Center
- Surface: Hard

Current champions (WTA 2026, ATP 2026)
- Women's singles: (Kazakhstan) Elena Rybakina
- Women's doubles: (United States) Desirae Krawczyk (Hungary) Fanny Stollár
ATP Tour
- Category: ATP Challenger 75
- Draw: 32S / 24Q / 16D
- Prize money: $107,000 (2026)
WTA Tour
- Category: WTA 500
- Draw: 28S / 24Q / 16D
- Prize money: $1,206,446 (2026)

The Ningbo Open (Chinese: 宁波网球公开赛) is a tennis tournament held in Ningbo, China. It is played on outdoor hardcourts. Since 2024, the women's event is listed as a WTA 500 tournament. The men's event is known as the Ningbo Challenger.

The women's event was previously part of the WTA 250 in 2023, and the WTA 125K series in 2013-2014.

The men's event ended in 2012, but restarted in 2015 as the Yinzhou Bank Cup. It was held until 2019 on the ATP Challenger Tour 125 and was known as the Ningbo Yinzhou International Tennis Challenger. It returned in 2026 as the Ningbo Challenger.

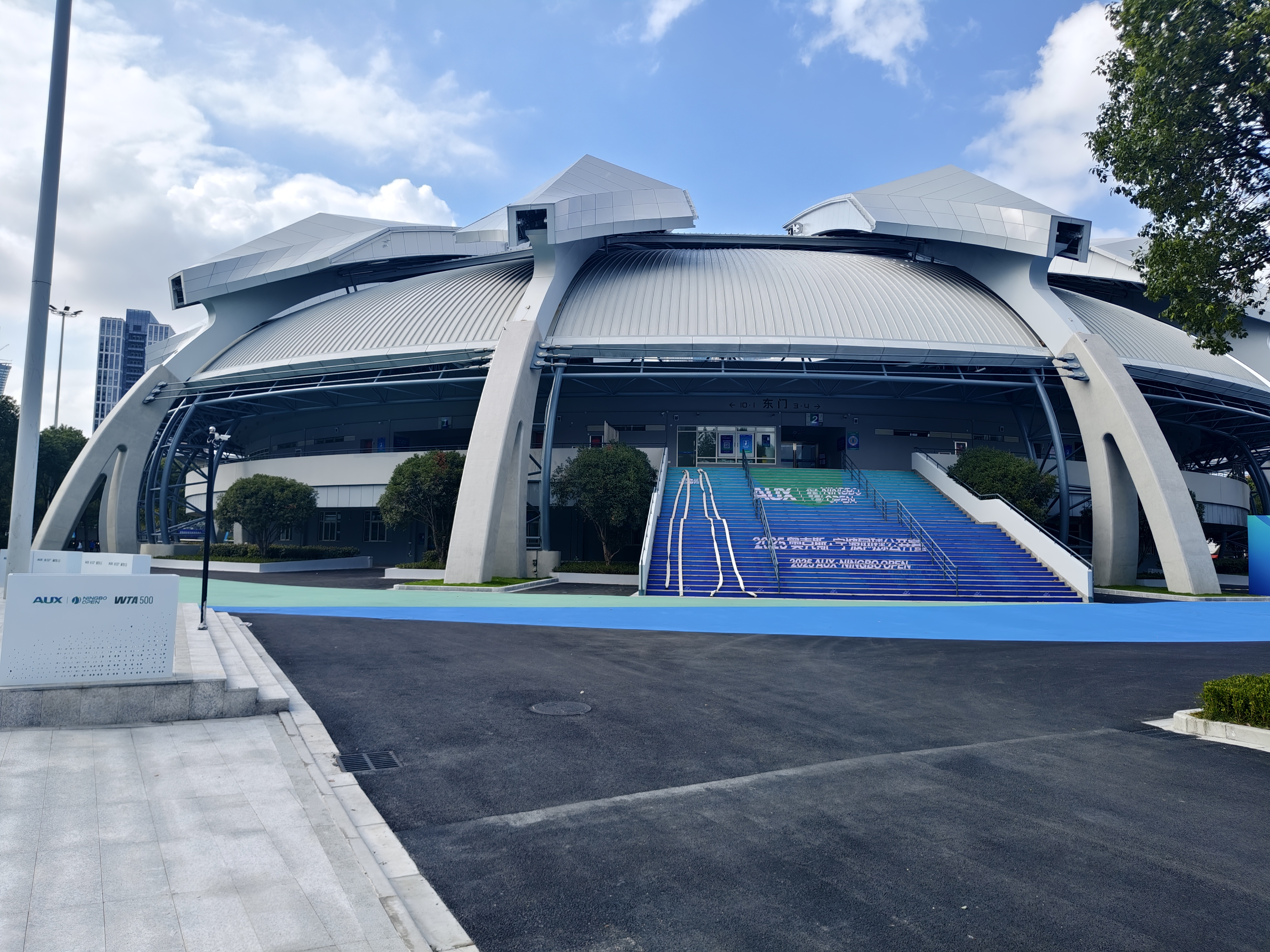
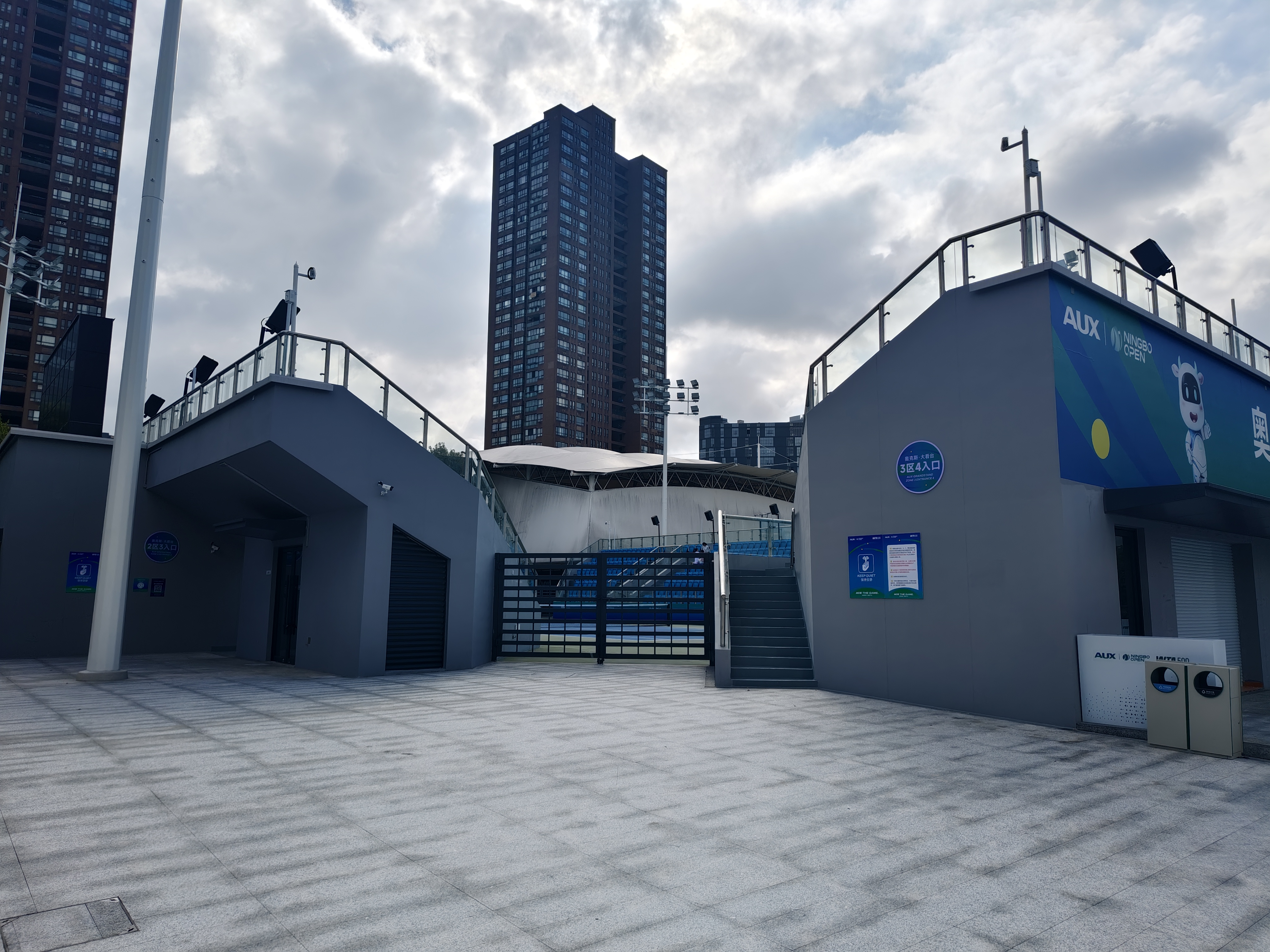
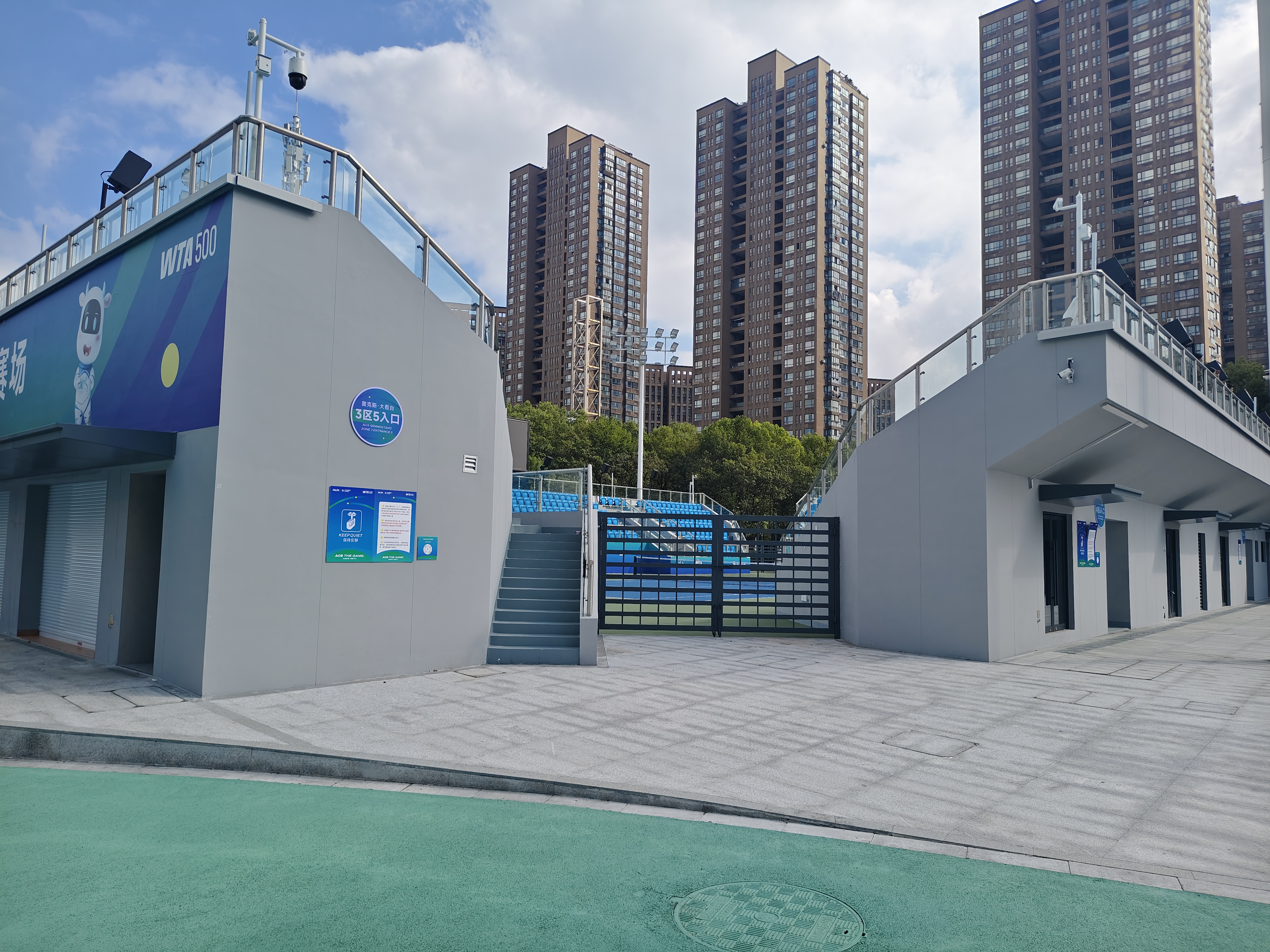
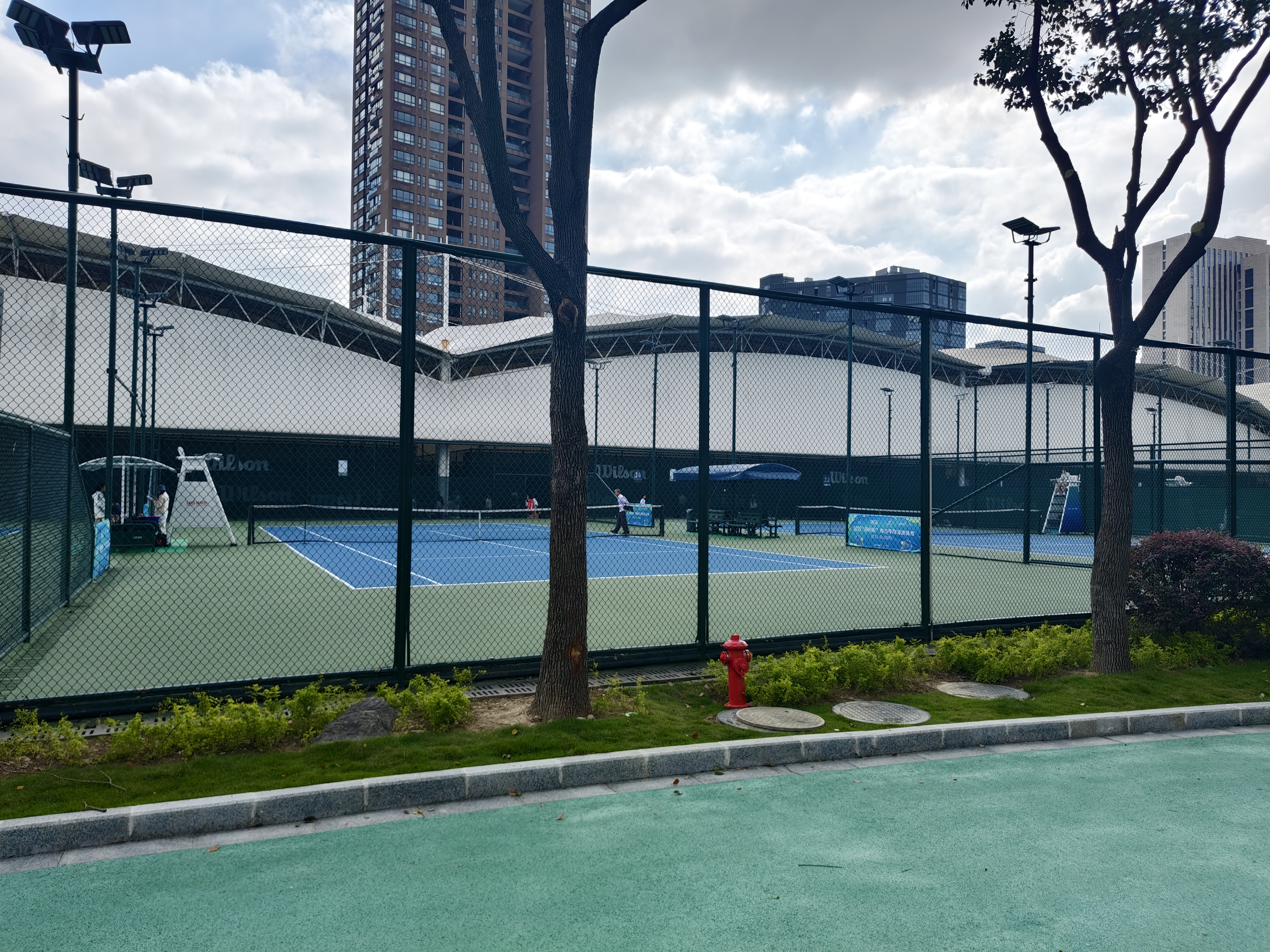
Ningbo Yinzhou Tennis Center in 2025

== Past finals ==
=== Women's singles ===
Year	Champion	Runner-up	Score
2026	(Kazakhstan) Elena Rybakina (2)	(Canada) Leylah Fernandez	6–2, 6–2
2025	(Kazakhstan) Elena Rybakina	Ekaterina Alexandrova	3–6, 6–0, 6–2
2024	Daria Kasatkina	Mirra Andreeva	6–0, 4–6, 6–4
↑ WTA 500 event ↑
2023	(Tunisia) Ons Jabeur	Diana Shnaider	6–2, 6–1
↑ WTA 250 event ↑
2015–22	Not held		
2014	(Poland) Magda Linette	(China) Wang Qiang	3–6, 7–5, 6–1
2013	(Serbia) Bojana Jovanovski	(China) Zhang Shuai	6–7^{(7–9)}, 6–4, 6–1
↑ WTA $125,000 event ↑
2012	(Chinese Taipei) Hsieh Su-wei	(China) Zhang Shuai	6–2, 6–2
2011	(Belarus) Anastasiya Yakimova	(Japan) Erika Sema	7–6^{(7–3)}, 6–3
2010	(Italy) Alberta Brianti	(Slovakia) Magdaléna Rybáriková	6–4, 6–4
↑ ITF 100,000+H event ↑

=== Women's doubles ===
Year	Champions	Runners-up	Score
2026	(United States) Desirae Krawczyk (Hungary) Fanny Stollár	(Spain) Cristina Bucșa (United States) Nicole Melichar-Martinez	7–6^{(7–5)}, 5–7, [10–6]
2025	(United States) Nicole Melichar-Martinez; Liudmila Samsonova	(Hungary) Tímea Babos (Brazil) Luisa Stefani	5–7, 6–4, [10–8]
2024	(Netherlands) Demi Schuurs (China) Yuan Yue	(United States) Nicole Melichar-Martinez (Australia) Ellen Perez	6–3, 6–3
↑ WTA 500 event ↑
2023	(Germany) Laura Siegemund; Vera Zvonareva	(China) Guo Hanyu (China) Jiang Xinyu	4–6, 6–3, [10–5]
↑ WTA 250 event ↑
2015–22	Not held		
2014	(Australia) Arina Rodionova (Ukraine) Olga Savchuk	(China) Han Xinyun (China) Zhang Kailin	4–6, 7–6^{(7–2)}, [10–6]
2013	(Chinese Taipei) Chan Yung-jan (China) Zhang Shuai	(Ukraine) Irina Buryachok (Georgia (country)) Oksana Kalashnikova	6–2, 6–1
↑ WTA $125,000 event ↑
2012	(Japan) Shuko Aoyama (Chinese Taipei) Chang Kai-chen	(United States) Tetiana Luzhanska (China) Zheng Saisai	6–2, 7–5
2011	(Ukraine) Tetiana Luzhanska (China) Zheng Saisai	(Chinese Taipei) Chan Chin-wei (China) Han Xinyun	6–4, 5–7, [10–4]
2010	(Chinese Taipei) Chan Chin-wei (Chinese Taipei) Chen Yi	(United States) Jill Craybas (Ukraine) Olga Savchuk	6–3, 3–6, [10–8]
↑ ITF 100,000+H event ↑

=== Men's singles ===
Year	Champion	Runner-up	Score
2026	Yaroslav Demin	Petr Bar Biryukov	5–7, 6–2, 7–6^{(8–6)}
2020–25	Not held		
2019	(Japan) Yasutaka Uchiyama	(Canada) Steven Diez	6–1, 6–3
2018	(Italy) Thomas Fabbiano	(India) Prajnesh Gunneswaran	7–6^{(7–4)}, 4–6, 6–3
2017	(Russia) Mikhail Youzhny	(Japan) Taro Daniel	6–1, 6–1
2016	(Chinese Taipei) Lu Yen-hsun	(Japan) Hiroki Moriya	6–3, 6–1
2015	(Chinese Taipei) Lu Yen-hsun	(Estonia) Jürgen Zopp	7–6^{(7–3)}, 6–1
2013–14	Not held		
2012	(Germany) Peter Gojowczyk	(South Korea) Jeong Suk-young	6–3, 6–1
2011	(Chinese Taipei) Lu Yen-hsun	(Estonia) Jürgen Zopp	6–2, 3–6, 6–1

=== Men's doubles ===
Year	Champions	Runners-up	Score
2026	(Japan) Akira Santillan (China) Zheng Baoluo	(Chinese Taipei) Hsieh Cheng-peng (Japan) Kaichi Uchida	6–3, 7–5
2020–25	Not held		
2019	(Australia) Andrew Harris (Australia) Marc Polmans	(Australia) Alex Bolt (Australia) Matt Reid	6–0, 6–1
2018	(China) Gong Maoxin (China) Zhang Ze	(Chinese Taipei) Hsieh Cheng-peng (Indonesia) Christopher Rungkat	7–5, 2–6, [10–5]
2017	(Moldova) Radu Albot (New Zealand) Jose Statham	(India) Jeevan Nedunchezhiyan (Indonesia) Christopher Rungkat	7–5, 6–3
2016	(France) Jonathan Eysseric (Ukraine) Sergiy Stakhovsky	(United States) Stefan Kozlov (Japan) Akira Santillan	6–4, 7–6^{(7–4)}
2015	(Israel) Dudi Sela (Israel) Amir Weintraub	(Croatia) Nikola Mektić (Croatia) Franko Škugor	6–3, 3–6, [10–6]
2013–14	Not held		
2012	(Thailand) Sanchai Ratiwatana (Thailand) Sonchat Ratiwatana	(China) Gong Maoxin (China) Zhang Ze	6–4, 6–2
2011	(India) Karan Rastogi (India) Divij Sharan	(Czech Republic) Jan Hernych (Estonia) Jürgen Zopp	3–6, 7–6^{(7–3)}, [13–11]
