= 2024 Santaizi ATP Challenger – Doubles =

Doubles
- 2024 Santaizi ATP Challenger

Final
- Champions: (Chinese Taipei) Ray Ho (South Korea) Nam Ji-sung
- Runners-up: (Japan) Toshihide Matsui (Japan) Kaito Uesugi
- Score: 6–2, 6–2

Events
Singles	Doubles
← 2019 ·	Santaizi ATP Challenger	· 2025 →

Sriram Balaji and Jonathan Erlich were the defending champions but chose not to defend their title.

Ray Ho and Nam Ji-sung won the title after defeating Toshihide Matsui and Kaito Uesugi 6–2, 6–2 in the final.

== Seeds ==
1. (Australia) Calum Puttergill / (United States) Reese Stalder (quarterfinals)
2. (Poland) Piotr Matuszewski / (Australia) Matthew Romios (quarterfinals)
3. (Chinese Taipei) Ray Ho / (South Korea) Nam Ji-sung (champions)
4. (Japan) Toshihide Matsui / (Japan) Kaito Uesugi (final)

== Draw ==
Key

- Q = Qualifier
- WC = Wild card
- LL = Lucky loser
- Alt = Alternate
- ITF = ITF entry
- PR = Protected ranking
- SR = Special ranking
- SE = Special exempt
- JE = Junior exempt
- JR = Junior Accelerator Programme entrant
- CO = College Accelerator Programme entrant
- NG = Next Gen Accelerator Program entrant
- w/o = Walkover
- r = Retired
- d = Defaulted

=== Draw ===
First round
1	(Australia) C Puttergill (United States) R Stalder	6	6
(United States) A Ayeni (New Zealand) R Statham	1	3
(Japan) Y Shimizu (Japan) J Trotter	6	6
(South Korea) Y-s Chung (Chinese Taipei) T-l Wu	4	4
3	(Chinese Taipei) R Ho (South Korea) J-s Nam	7	2	[10]
(United Kingdom) A Fery (United Kingdom) J Paris	5	6	[2]
(Australia) B Bayldon (Northern Mariana Islands) C Sinclair	6	3	[6]
(Switzerland) R Bertola (India) R Ramanathan	1	6	[10]
(Australia) B Ellis (Japan) R Noguchi	6	6
(Philippines) FC Alcantara (Indonesia) C Rungkat	3	4
WC	(Chinese Taipei) C-p Hsieh (Chinese Taipei) T-h Yang	6^{4}	4
4	(Japan) T Matsui (Japan) K Uesugi	7^{7}	6
(Chinese Taipei) Y-h Hsu (Chinese Taipei) T-h Huang	7^{7}	3	[3]
(Australia) J Delaney (Australia) M Purcell	6^{3}	6	[10]
WC	(Chinese Taipei) K-y Lee (Chinese Taipei) Yin Bang-shuo	3	5
2	(Poland) P Matuszewski (Australia) MC Romios	6	7

Quarterfinals
1	(Australia) C Puttergill (United States) R Stalder	6^{5}	7	[7]
(Japan) Y Shimizu (Japan) J Trotter	7^{7}	5	[10]
3	(Chinese Taipei) R Ho (South Korea) J-s Nam	6	6
(Switzerland) R Bertola (India) R Ramanathan	2	4
(Australia) B Ellis (Japan) R Noguchi	6	5	[4]
4	(Japan) T Matsui (Japan) K Uesugi	3	7	[10]
(Australia) J Delaney (Australia) M Purcell	6	6
2	(Poland) P Matuszewski (Australia) MC Romios	4	2

Semifinals
(Japan) Y Shimizu (Japan) J Trotter	2	6	[6]
3	(Chinese Taipei) R Ho (South Korea) J-s Nam	6	3	[10]
4	(Japan) T Matsui (Japan) K Uesugi	7^{7}	3	[13]
(Australia) J Delaney (Australia) M Purcell	6^{4}	6	[11]

Final
3	(Chinese Taipei) R Ho (South Korea) J-s Nam	6	6
4	(Japan) T Matsui (Japan) K Uesugi	2	2
