= 2015 Santaizi ATP Challenger – Singles =

Singles
- 2015 Santaizi ATP Challenger

Final
- Champion: (Australia) Sam Groth
- Runner-up: (Russia) Konstantin Kravchuk
- Score: 6–7^{(5–7)}, 6–4, 7–6^{(7–3)}

Events
Singles	Doubles
← 2014 ·	Santaizi ATP Challenger	· 2016 →

Gilles Müller was the defending champion, but he did not participate this year. He played in Estoril instead.

Sam Groth won the tournament, defeating Konstantin Kravchuk in the final.

== Seeds ==
1. (Chinese Taipei) Lu Yen-hsun (quarterfinals)
2. (Australia) Sam Groth (champion)
3. (Japan) Go Soeda (quarterfinals)
4. (Slovakia) Lukáš Lacko (second round)
5. (Japan) Tatsuma Ito (quarterfinals)
6. (United States) Ryan Harrison (second round, retired)
7. (Ukraine) Illya Marchenko (quarterfinals)
8. (Chinese Taipei) Jimmy Wang (second round)

== Draw ==
=== Key ===
- Q = Qualifier
- WC = Wild card
- LL = Lucky loser
- Alt = Alternate
- SE = Special exempt
- PR = Protected ranking
- ITF = ITF entry
- JE = Junior exempt
- w/o = Walkover
- r = Retired
- d = Defaulted
- SR = Special ranking

=== Finals ===
Semifinals
(Russia) Konstantin Kravchuk	6^{3}	7^{7}	7^{7}
(Australia) Matthew Ebden	7^{7}	6^{4}	6^{4}
(India) Yuki Bhambri	4	5
2	(Australia) Sam Groth	6	7

Final
(Russia) Konstantin Kravchuk	7^{7}	4	6^{3}
2	(Australia) Sam Groth	6^{5}	6	7^{7}

=== Top half ===
First round
1	(Chinese Taipei) Y-h Lu	7^{8}	6
(Chinese Taipei) T Chen	6^{6}	2
Q	(Japan) T Matsui	6	6^{5}	3
(Japan) T Niki	4	7^{7}	6
(United States) J Jung	7^{7}	5	3
(Russia) K Kravchuk	6^{5}	7	6
WC	(Chinese Taipei) C-h Yi	3	4
6	(United States) R Harrison	6	6
4	(Slovakia) L Lacko	6	6
(United Kingdom) B Klein	3	4
(Australia) M Ebden	6	6
(United Kingdom) E Corrie	4	2
(United States) D Kudla	6	6
WC	(Chinese Taipei) J-c Hung	2	4
(Thailand) D Udomchoke	3	5
7	(Ukraine) I Marchenko	6	7

Second round
1	(Chinese Taipei) Y-h Lu	6	6
(Japan) T Niki	1	3
(Russia) K Kravchuk	0
6	(United States) R Harrison	1^{r}
4	(Slovakia) L Lacko	5	3
(Australia) M Ebden	7	6
(United States) D Kudla	0	5
7	(Ukraine) I Marchenko	6	7

Quarterfinals
1	(Chinese Taipei) Y-h Lu	6^{4}	6	5
(Russia) K Kravchuk	7^{7}	4	7
(Australia) M Ebden	6	6
7	(Ukraine) I Marchenko	3	4

Semifinals
(Russia) K Kravchuk	6^{3}	7^{7}	7^{7}
(Australia) M Ebden	7^{7}	6^{4}	6^{4}

=== Bottom half ===
First round
8	(Chinese Taipei) J Wang	2	6	7^{7}
(India) R Ramanathan	6	3	6^{4}
Q	(Japan) Yuuya Kibi	1	6	3
(India) Y Bhambri	6	4	6
WC	(Chinese Taipei) C-f Wang	3	2
Q	(Australia) M Barton	6	6
WC	(Chinese Taipei) Ho Chih-jen	2	0
3	(Japan) G Soeda	6	6
5	(Japan) T Ito	6	6
(Denmark) F Nielsen	2	3
(India) S Myneni	2^{r}
(Japan) H Moriya	5
Q	(Chinese Taipei) C-y Yu	4	3
(Australia) J-P Smith	6	6
(China) Z Zhang	6^{3}	4
2	(Australia) S Groth	7^{7}	6

Second round
8	(Chinese Taipei) J Wang	3	1
(India) Y Bhambri	6	6
Q	(Australia) M Barton	7^{7}	3	4
3	(Japan) G Soeda	6^{3}	6	6
5	(Japan) T Ito	6	6
(Japan) H Moriya	3	3
(Australia) J-P Smith	6^{3}	6^{2}
2	(Australia) S Groth	7^{7}	7^{7}

Quarterfinals
(India) Y Bhambri	6	3	6
3	(Japan) G Soeda	4	6	3
5	(Japan) T Ito	2	6^{4}
2	(Australia) S Groth	6	7^{7}

Semifinals
(India) Y Bhambri	4	5
2	(Australia) S Groth	6	7
