= 2017 Santaizi ATP Challenger – Doubles =

Doubles
- 2017 Santaizi ATP Challenger

Final
- Champions: (Switzerland) Marco Chiudinelli (Croatia) Franko Škugor
- Runners-up: (Thailand) Sanchai Ratiwatana (Thailand) Sonchat Ratiwatana
- Score: 4–6, 6–2, [10–5]

Events
Singles	Doubles
← 2016 ·	Santaizi ATP Challenger	· 2018 →

Hsieh Cheng-peng and Yang Tsung-hua were the defending champions but lost in the semifinals to Sanchai and Sonchat Ratiwatana.

Marco Chiudinelli and Franko Škugor won the title after defeating Ratiwatana and Ratiwatana 4–6, 6–2, [10–5] in the final.

== Seeds ==
1. (Thailand) Sanchai Ratiwatana / (Thailand) Sonchat Ratiwatana (final)
2. (India) Jeevan Nedunchezhiyan / (Indonesia) Christopher Rungkat (first round)
3. (Australia) Bradley Mousley / (Australia) Luke Saville (quarterfinals)
4. (Germany) Andre Begemann / (Russia) Alexander Kudryavtsev (quarterfinals)

== Draw ==
=== Key ===
- Q = Qualifier
- WC = Wild card
- LL = Lucky loser
- Alt = Alternate
- ITF = ITF entry
- PR = Protected ranking
- SR = Special ranking
- SE = Special exempt
- JE = Junior exempt
- JR = Junior Accelerator Programme entrant
- CO = College Accelerator Programme entrant
- NG = Next Gen Accelerator Program entrant
- w/o = Walkover
- r = Retired
- d = Defaulted

First round
1	(Thailand) Sa Ratiwatana (Thailand) So Ratiwatana	6	6
(Republic of Ireland) D O'Hare (United Kingdom) J Salisbury	3	4
(Chinese Taipei) T Chen (Chinese Taipei) J Jung	4	7	[11]
(South Africa) R Roelofse (Chinese Taipei) C-h Yi	6	5	[9]
4	(Germany) A Begemann (Russia) A Kudryavtsev	6	7
WC	(Chinese Taipei) Y-h Hsu (Chinese Taipei) K-y Lee	3	5
(Chinese Taipei) C-p Hsieh (Chinese Taipei) T-h Yang	6	6
WC	(Chinese Taipei) J Wang (Chinese Taipei) C-y Yu	3	4
(Switzerland) M Chiudinelli (Croatia) F Škugor	7^{8}	7^{7}
WC	(Chinese Taipei) J-c Hung (Chinese Taipei) T-l Wu	6^{6}	6^{2}
(Russia) K Kravchuk (Japan) A Santillan	6	4	[7]
3	(Australia) B Mousley (Australia) L Saville	4	6	[10]
PR	(Australia) M Ebden (United Kingdom) B Klein	3	4
(Japan) T Matsui (Japan) Y Uchiyama	6	6
(Australia) S de Waard (New Zealand) B McLachlan	4	6	[10]
2	(India) J Nedunchezhiyan (Indonesia) C Rungkat	6	4	[8]

Quarterfinals
1	(Thailand) Sa Ratiwatana (Thailand) So Ratiwatana	7^{7}	6
(Chinese Taipei) T Chen (Chinese Taipei) J Jung	6^{4}	3
4	(Germany) A Begemann (Russia) A Kudryavtsev	2	4
(Chinese Taipei) C-p Hsieh (Chinese Taipei) T-h Yang	6	6
(Switzerland) M Chiudinelli (Croatia) F Škugor	6^{6}	7^{7}	[10]
3	(Australia) B Mousley (Australia) L Saville	7^{8}	6^{1}	[8]
(Japan) T Matsui (Japan) Y Uchiyama	6^{3}	3
(Australia) S de Waard (New Zealand) B McLachlan	7^{7}	6

Semifinals
1	(Thailand) Sa Ratiwatana (Thailand) So Ratiwatana	6	7
(Chinese Taipei) C-p Hsieh (Chinese Taipei) T-h Yang	4	5
(Switzerland) M Chiudinelli (Croatia) F Škugor	7^{7}	6^{4}	[10]
(Australia) S de Waard (New Zealand) B McLachlan	6^{3}	7^{7}	[7]

Final
1	(Thailand) Sa Ratiwatana (Thailand) So Ratiwatana	6	2	[5]
(Switzerland) M Chiudinelli (Croatia) F Škugor	4	6	[10]
