= 2017 Santaizi ATP Challenger – Singles =

Singles
- 2017 Santaizi ATP Challenger

Final
- Champion: (Chinese Taipei) Lu Yen-hsun
- Runner-up: (Japan) Tatsuma Ito
- Score: 6–1, 7–6^{(7–4)}

Events
Singles	Doubles
← 2016 ·	Santaizi ATP Challenger	· 2018 →

Dan Evans was the defending champion but chose not to defend his title.

Lu Yen-hsun won the title after defeating Tatsuma Ito 6–1, 7–6^{(7–4)} in the final.

== Seeds ==
1. (Cyprus) Marcos Baghdatis (first round)
2. (Chinese Taipei) Lu Yen-hsun (champion)
3. (Russia) Konstantin Kravchuk (quarterfinals)
4. (Israel) Dudi Sela (second round)
5. (Slovakia) Lukáš Lacko (second round)
6. (Canada) Vasek Pospisil (semifinals)
7. (South Korea) Lee Duck-hee (first round)
8. (Japan) Go Soeda (quarterfinals)

== Draw ==
=== Key ===
- Q = Qualifier
- WC = Wild card
- LL = Lucky loser
- Alt = Alternate
- SE = Special exempt
- PR = Protected ranking
- ITF = ITF entry
- JE = Junior exempt
- w/o = Walkover
- r = Retired
- d = Defaulted
- SR = Special ranking

=== Finals ===
Semifinals
(Japan) Akira Santillan	4	6	5
(Japan) Tatsuma Ito	6	2	7
6	(Canada) Vasek Pospisil	4	4
2	(Chinese Taipei) Lu Yen-hsun	6	6

Final
(Japan) Tatsuma Ito	1	6^{4}
2	(Chinese Taipei) Lu Yen-hsun	6	7^{7}

=== Top half ===
First round
1/WC	(Cyprus) M Baghdatis	3	5
(South Korea) S-w Kwon	6	7
Q	(Australia) M Ebden	6	7
(Chinese Taipei) T Chen	2	5
(Japan) A Santillan	6	3	7^{7}
(Australia) M Matosevic	1	6	6^{5}
(India) R Ramanathan	2	6	6
7	(South Korea) D-h Lee	6	2	4
3	(Russia) K Kravchuk	6	6
(Czech Republic) Marek Jaloviec	3	3
(Japan) Shuichi Sekiguchi	1	4
(Croatia) F Škugor	6	6
(Japan) Y Uchiyama	4	0^{r}
(Japan) T Ito	6	3
(Chinese Taipei) J Jung	1	4
5	(Slovakia) L Lacko	6	6

Second round
(South Korea) S-w Kwon	7^{7}	5	2
Q	(Australia) M Ebden	6^{3}	7	6
(Japan) A Santillan	6	3	7^{7}
(India) R Ramanathan	4	6	6^{4}
3	(Russia) K Kravchuk	7^{7}	7
(Croatia) F Škugor	6^{5}	5
(Japan) T Ito	6	6
5	(Slovakia) L Lacko	4	4

Quarterfinals
Q	(Australia) M Ebden	4	6	0
(Japan) A Santillan	6	1	6
3	(Russia) K Kravchuk	4	6^{5}
(Japan) T Ito	6	7^{7}

Semifinals
(Japan) A Santillan	4	6	5
(Japan) T Ito	6	2	7

=== Bottom half ===
First round
6	(Canada) V Pospisil	7	6
Q	(India) S Mukund	5	2
(India) P Gunneswaran	7^{7}	6
Q	(South Africa) R Roelofse	6^{4}	4
(Switzerland) M Chiudinelli	6	6
(Australia) L Saville	4	4
WC	(Chinese Taipei) T-h Yang	4	2
4	(Israel) D Sela	6	6
8	(Japan) G Soeda	7^{7}	7^{7}
(Japan) H Moriya	6^{2}	6^{5}
Q	(Germany) M Bachinger	6	6
(United Kingdom) B Klein	4	2
WC	(Chinese Taipei) J Wang	4	6	0
(Russia) A Kudryavtsev	6	4	0^{r}
WC	(Chinese Taipei) K-y Lee	2	1
2	(Chinese Taipei) Y-h Lu	6	6

Second round
6	(Canada) V Pospisil	7^{7}	6
(India) P Gunneswaran	6^{4}	2
(Switzerland) M Chiudinelli	6	6
4	(Israel) D Sela	4	3
8	(Japan) G Soeda	4	6	6
Q	(Germany) M Bachinger	6	4	1
WC	(Chinese Taipei) J Wang	5	1
2	(Chinese Taipei) Y-h Lu	7	6

Quarterfinals
6	(Canada) V Pospisil	6	6
(Switzerland) M Chiudinelli	3	4
8	(Japan) G Soeda	1	3
2	(Chinese Taipei) Y-h Lu	6	6

Semifinals
6	(Canada) V Pospisil	4	4
2	(Chinese Taipei) Y-h Lu	6	6
