= 2018 Santaizi ATP Challenger – Doubles =

Doubles
- 2018 Santaizi ATP Challenger

Final
- Champions: (Australia) Matthew Ebden (Australia) Andrew Whittington
- Runners-up: (India) Prajnesh Gunneswaran (India) Saketh Myneni
- Score: 6–4, 5–7, [10–6]

Events
Singles	Doubles
← 2017 ·	Santaizi ATP Challenger	· 2019 →

Marco Chiudinelli and Franko Škugor were the defending champions but chose not to defend their title.

Matthew Ebden and Andrew Whittington won the title after defeating Prajnesh Gunneswaran and Saketh Myneni 6–4, 5–7, [10–6] in the final.

== Seeds ==
1. (Germany) Philipp Petzschner / (Germany) Tim Pütz (withdrew)
2. (Thailand) Sanchai Ratiwatana / (Thailand) Sonchat Ratiwatana (semifinals)
3. (India) Sriram Balaji / (India) Vishnu Vardhan (quarterfinals)
4. (Belarus) Aliaksandr Bury / (Chinese Taipei) Peng Hsien-yin (quarterfinals, retired)

== Draw ==
=== Key ===
- Q = Qualifier
- WC = Wild card
- LL = Lucky loser
- Alt = Alternate
- SE = Special exempt
- PR = Protected ranking
- ITF = ITF entry
- JE = Junior exempt
- w/o = Walkover
- r = Retired
- d = Defaulted
- SR = Special ranking

First round
Alt/PR	(India) P Gunneswaran (India) S Myneni	6	7
WC	(Chinese Taipei) T-l Wu (Chinese Taipei) C-y Yu	4	5
WC	(Chinese Taipei) K-y Lee (Chinese Taipei) Liu Shao-fan	4	7	[5]
(Philippines) R Gonzales (Indonesia) C Rungkat	6	5	[10]
4	(Belarus) A Bury (Chinese Taipei) H-y Peng	6	6
(Chinese Taipei) J Jung (Japan) G Soeda	2	3
(United Kingdom) B Klein (South Africa) R Roelofse	4	6^{5}
WC	(Chinese Taipei) Y-h Hsu (Chinese Taipei) J Wang	6	7^{7}
(Australia) M Ebden (Australia) A Whittington	6	7
(Switzerland) L Margaroli (India) R Ramanathan	3	5
(Chinese Taipei) T Chen (Chinese Taipei) C-h Yi	5	7^{7}	[8]
3	(India) S Balaji (India) V Vardhan	7	6^{5}	[10]
(Chinese Taipei) C-p Hsieh (Chinese Taipei) T-h Yang	6^{1}	6^{2}
(Israel) J Erlich (Denmark) F Nielsen	7^{7}	7^{7}
(Japan) T Ito (Japan) T Matsui	7^{7}	3	[6]
2	(Thailand) Sa Ratiwatana (Thailand) So Ratiwatana	6^{2}	6	[10]

Quarterfinals
Alt/PR	(India) P Gunneswaran (India) S Myneni	7	6
(Philippines) R Gonzales (Indonesia) C Rungkat	5	4
4	(Belarus) A Bury (Chinese Taipei) H-y Peng	1^{r}
WC	(Chinese Taipei) Y-h Hsu (Chinese Taipei) J Wang	2
(Australia) M Ebden (Australia) A Whittington	6	6
3	(India) S Balaji (India) V Vardhan	4	4
(Israel) J Erlich (Denmark) F Nielsen	0	6	[6]
2	(Thailand) Sa Ratiwatana (Thailand) So Ratiwatana	6	3	[10]

Semifinals
Alt/PR	(India) P Gunneswaran (India) S Myneni	2	6	[14]
WC	(Chinese Taipei) Y-h Hsu (Chinese Taipei) J Wang	6	4	[12]
(Australia) M Ebden (Australia) A Whittington	6	6
2	(Thailand) Sa Ratiwatana (Thailand) So Ratiwatana	3	4

Final
Alt/PR	(India) P Gunneswaran (India) S Myneni	4	7	[6]
(Australia) M Ebden (Australia) A Whittington	6	5	[10]
