= 2014 Santaizi ATP Challenger – Singles =

Singles
- 2014 Santaizi ATP Challenger

Final
- Champion: (Luxembourg) Gilles Müller
- Runner-up: (Australia) John-Patrick Smith
- Score: 6–3, 6–3

Events
Singles	Doubles
Santaizi ATP Challenger	· 2015 →

This was the first edition of the tournament

Gilles Müller won the title, defeating John-Patrick Smith in the final, 6–3, 6–3.

== Seeds ==
1. (Chinese Taipei) Lu Yen-hsun (withdrew)
2. (Slovakia) Lukáš Lacko (quarterfinals)
3. (United States) Rajeev Ram (first round)
4. (Japan) Go Soeda (semifinals)
5. (Australia) Samuel Groth (first round)
6. (Japan) Tatsuma Ito (semifinals)
7. (Chinese Taipei) Jimmy Wang (quarterfinals)
8. (Japan) Hiroki Moriya (quarterfinals)

== Draw ==
=== Key ===
- Q = Qualifier
- WC = Wild card
- LL = Lucky loser
- Alt = Alternate
- SE = Special exempt
- PR = Protected ranking
- ITF = ITF entry
- JE = Junior exempt
- w/o = Walkover
- r = Retired
- d = Defaulted
- SR = Special ranking

=== Finals ===
Semifinals
6	(Japan) Tatsuma Ito	6	6^{3}	4
(Australia) John-Patrick Smith	1	7^{7}	6
4	(Japan) Go Soeda	2	4
(Luxembourg) Gilles Müller	6	6

Final
(Australia) John-Patrick Smith	3	3
(Luxembourg) Gilles Müller	6	6

=== Top half ===
First round
LL	(Chinese Taipei) Ho Chih-jen	1	3
(Chinese Taipei) L-c Huang	6	6
Q	(Chinese Taipei) Chuang Ting-yu	3	2
(Israel) A Weintraub	6	6
(Slovakia) K Beck	6	6^{1}	5
(Chinese Taipei) T-h Yang	4	7^{7}	7
Q	(Chinese Taipei) H-y Peng	1	3
6	(Japan) T Ito	6	6
3	(United States) R Ram	7^{7}	6^{5}	1
(Chinese Taipei) T Chen	6^{4}	7^{7}	6
(Australia) J-P Smith	6	7
WC	(Chinese Taipei) C-f Wang	4	5
LL	(Australia) C Guccione	4	1
(Australia) L Saville	6	6
Q	(Australia) B Mott	4	6^{5}
8	(Japan) H Moriya	6	7^{7}

Second round
(Chinese Taipei) L-c Huang	4	1
(Israel) A Weintraub	6	6
(Chinese Taipei) T-h Yang	4	6	2
6	(Japan) T Ito	6	4	6
(Chinese Taipei) T Chen	3	6^{2}
(Australia) J-P Smith	6	7^{7}
(Australia) L Saville	6	2	3
8	(Japan) H Moriya	3	6	6

Quarterfinals
(Israel) A Weintraub	6	3	1
6	(Japan) T Ito	1	6	6
(Australia) J-P Smith	6	6
8	(Japan) H Moriya	3	2

Semifinals
6	(Japan) T Ito	6	6^{3}	4
(Australia) J-P Smith	1	7^{7}	6

=== Bottom half ===
First round
7	(Chinese Taipei) J Wang	5	6	6
WC	(Chinese Taipei) C-y Yu	7	2	1
(United States) A Krajicek	3	6	6
(Switzerland) M Chiudinelli	6	3	4
(United States) J Jung	6	6
WC	(Chinese Taipei) Yang Shao-chi	1	1
WC	(Chinese Taipei) J-c Hung	4	4
4	(Japan) G Soeda	6	6
5	(Australia) S Groth	6^{1}	6^{8}
(Luxembourg) G Müller	7^{7}	7^{10}
(Japan) Shuichi Sekiguchi	6	6
PR	(Australia) J Millman	1	3
Q	(Chinese Taipei) Tang Chih-chun	0	4
(Japan) T Matsui	6	6
(China) D Wu	3	2
2	(Slovakia) L Lacko	6	6

Second round
7	(Chinese Taipei) J Wang	7^{7}	6
(United States) A Krajicek	6^{4}	0
(United States) J Jung	6^{2}	2
4	(Japan) G Soeda	7^{7}	6
(Luxembourg) G Müller	7	7^{7}
(Japan) S Sekiguchi	5	6^{0}
(Japan) T Matsui	4	3
2	(Slovakia) L Lacko	6	6

Quarterfinals
7	(Chinese Taipei) J Wang	3	6^{8}
4	(Japan) G Soeda	6	7^{10}
(Luxembourg) G Müller	6	3	6
2	(Slovakia) L Lacko	4	6	4

Semifinals
4	(Japan) G Soeda	2	4
(Luxembourg) G Müller	6	6
