= 2019 Santaizi ATP Challenger =

- Date: 8–14 April
- Edition: 6th
- Draw: 48S / 16D
- Surface: Hard (indoor)
- Location: Taipei, Taiwan

Champions

Singles
- (Austria) Dennis Novak

Doubles
- (India) Sriram Balaji / (Israel) Jonathan Erlich
← 2018 ·	Santaizi ATP Challenger	· 2024 →

The 2019 Santaizi ATP Challenger was a professional tennis tournament played on indoor hard courts. It was the sixth edition of the tournament which was part of the 2019 ATP Challenger Tour. It took place in Taipei, Taiwan between 8 and 14 April.

== Singles main-draw entrants ==
=== Seeds ===
Country	Player	Rank^{1}	Seed
RSA	Lloyd Harris	95	1
RUS	Evgeny Donskoy	123	2
UKR	Sergiy Stakhovsky	124	3
SVK	Lukáš Lacko	125	4
GER	Matthias Bachinger	128	5
POL	Kamil Majchrzak	130	6
TPE	Jason Jung	133	7
CYP	Marcos Baghdatis	137	8
IND	Ramkumar Ramanathan	140	9
JPN	Tatsuma Ito	146	10
AUT	Dennis Novak	155	11
AUS	James Duckworth	162	12
KOR	Kwon Soon-woo	165	13
JPN	Hiroki Moriya	178	14
JPN	Yūichi Sugita	187	15
FRA	Maxime Janvier	198	16

- ^{1} Rankings are as of 1 April 2019.

=== Other entrants ===
The following players received wildcards into the singles main draw:

- (Chinese Taipei) Ray Ho
- (Chinese Taipei) Hsu Yu-hsiou
- (Chinese Taipei) Lee Kuan-yi
- (Chinese Taipei) Lo Chien-hsun
- (Chinese Taipei) Yu Cheng-yu

The following player received entry into the singles main draw using a protected ranking:

- (Ukraine) Illya Marchenko

The following players received entry from the qualifying draw:

- (India) Sriram Balaji
- (Chinese Taipei) Hsieh Cheng-peng

The following player received entry as a lucky loser:

- (United Kingdom) Brydan Klein

== Champions ==
=== Singles ===
- (Austria) Dennis Novak def. (Ukraine) Sergiy Stakhovsky 6–2, 6–4.

=== Doubles ===
- (India) Sriram Balaji / (Israel) Jonathan Erlich def. (Netherlands) Sander Arends / (Austria) Tristan-Samuel Weissborn 6–3, 6–2.
