= 2024 Santaizi ATP Challenger – Singles =

Singles
- 2024 Santaizi ATP Challenger

Final
- Champion: (Australia) Adam Walton
- Runner-up: (Ukraine) Illya Marchenko
- Score: 3–6, 6–2, 7–6^{(7–3)}

Events
Singles	Doubles
← 2019 ·	Santaizi ATP Challenger	· 2025 →

Dennis Novak was the defending champion but chose not to defend his title.

Adam Walton won the title after defeating Illya Marchenko 3–6, 6–2, 7–6^{(7–3)} in the final.

== Seeds ==
1. (Australia) Max Purcell (quarterfinals)
2. (Australia) James Duckworth (semifinals)
3. (Australia) Adam Walton (champion)
4. (Japan) Yasutaka Uchiyama (first round)
5. (Australia) Li Tu (second round)
6. (South Korea) Hong Seong-chan (quarterfinals)
7. (Australia) Omar Jasika (first round)
8. (France) Antoine Escoffier (second round)

== Draw ==
Key

- Q = Qualifier
- WC = Wild card
- LL = Lucky loser
- Alt = Alternate
- ITF = ITF entry
- PR = Protected ranking
- SR = Special ranking
- SE = Special exempt
- JE = Junior exempt
- JR = Junior Accelerator Programme entrant
- CO = College Accelerator Programme entrant
- NG = Next Gen Accelerator Program entrant
- w/o = Walkover
- r = Retired
- d = Defaulted

=== Finals ===
Semifinals
(Ukraine) Illya Marchenko	0	7^{7}	6
(Chinese Taipei) Hsu Yu-hsiou	6	6^{3}	3
3	(Australia) Adam Walton	3	7^{7}	6
2	(Australia) James Duckworth	6	6^{4}	2

Final
(Ukraine) Illya Marchenko	6	2	6^{3}
3	(Australia) Adam Walton	3	6	7^{7}

=== Top half ===
First round
1	(Australia) M Purcell	6^{3}	6	6
Q	(Japan) J Trotter	7^{7}	3	2
WC	(Chinese Taipei) R Ho	3	1
Q	(Switzerland) R Bertola	6	6
(Ukraine) I Marchenko	6	7^{7}
(Japan) H Moriya	3	6^{4}
E Donskoy	6	7^{10}
7	(Australia) O Jasika	4	6^{8}
4	(Japan) Y Uchiyama	6^{5}	3
(Chinese Taipei) Y-h Hsu	7^{7}	6
Q	(United States) A Ayeni	6^{2}	3
(Japan) R Noguchi	7^{7}	6
Q	(Australia) B Ellis	6	6
WC	(Chinese Taipei) T-h Huang	2	4
(Tunisia) M Echargui	6^{7}	2
6	(South Korea) S-c Hong	7^{9}	6

Second round
1	(Australia) M Purcell	6	4	6
Q	(Switzerland) R Bertola	3	6	4
(Ukraine) I Marchenko	3	6	6
E Donskoy	6	3	4
(Chinese Taipei) Y-h Hsu	6	6
(Japan) R Noguchi	1	4
Q	(Australia) B Ellis	2	2
6	(South Korea) S-c Hong	6	6

Quarterfinals
1	(Australia) M Purcell	4	3
(Ukraine) I Marchenko	6	6
(Chinese Taipei) Y-h Hsu	6	4	6
6	(South Korea) S-c Hong	4	6	1

Semifinals
(Ukraine) I Marchenko	0	7^{7}	6
(Chinese Taipei) Y-h Hsu	6	6^{3}	3

=== Bottom half ===
First round
8	(France) A Escoffier	6	4	7^{7}
Alt	(Australia) J McCabe	1	6	6^{4}
(Lithuania) R Berankis	6	6
(United States) B Holt	1	1
Q	(South Korea) J-s Nam	6	7^{7}
Alt	(South Korea) Y-s Chung	4	6^{0}
(Japan) Y Shimizu	6^{5}	0
3	(Australia) A Walton	7^{7}	6
5	(Australia) L Tu	7	6
(Australia) P Sekulic	5	2
(United Kingdom) A Fery	6	7
(Chinese Taipei) T-l Wu	1	5
(India) R Ramanathan	6	6
WC	(Chinese Taipei) Yin Bang-shuo	4	4
Q	(India) M Sasikumar	3	4
2	(Australia) J Duckworth	6	6

Second round
8	(France) A Escoffier	6	2	2
(Lithuania) R Berankis	3	6	6
Q	(South Korea) J-s Nam	0	3
3	(Australia) A Walton	6	6
5	(Australia) L Tu	4	4
(United Kingdom) A Fery	6	6
(India) R Ramanathan	4	6^{2}
2	(Australia) J Duckworth	6	7^{7}

Quarterfinals
(Lithuania) R Berankis	3	6^{7}
3	(Australia) A Walton	6	7^{9}
(United Kingdom) A Fery	5	5
2	(Australia) J Duckworth	7	7

Semifinals
3	(Australia) A Walton	3	7^{7}	6
2	(Australia) J Duckworth	6	6^{4}	2
