= 2015 Santaizi ATP Challenger =

- Date: 27 April – 3 May
- Edition: 2nd
- Draw: 32S / 16D
- Prize money: $75,000+H
- Surface: Carpet (indoors)
- Location: Taipei, Taiwan

Champions

Singles
- (Australia) Sam Groth

Doubles
- (Australia) Matthew Ebden / (Chinese Taipei) Wang Chieh-fu
← 2014 ·	Santaizi ATP Challenger	· 2016 →

The 2015 Santaizi ATP Challenger was a professional tennis tournament played on carpet courts. It was the second edition of the tournament which was part of the 2015 ATP Challenger Tour. It took place in Taipei, Taiwan between 27 April and 3 May.

== Singles main-draw entrants ==
=== Seeds ===
Country	Player	Rank^{1}	Seed
TPE	Lu Yen-hsun	62	1
AUS	Sam Groth	86	2
JPN	Go Soeda	88	3
SVK	Lukáš Lacko	91	4
JPN	Tatsuma Ito	97	5
USA	Ryan Harrison	126	6
UKR	Illya Marchenko	133	7
TPE	Jimmy Wang	136	8

- ^{1} Rankings are as of April 20, 2015

=== Other entrants ===
The following players received wildcards into the singles main draw:

- (Chinese Taipei) Yi Chu-huan
- (Chinese Taipei) Hung Jui-chen
- (Chinese Taipei) Wang Chieh-fu
- (Chinese Taipei) Ho Chih-jen

The following players received entry from the qualifying draw:

- (Australia) Matthew Barton
- (Chinese Taipei) Yu Cheng-yu
- (Japan) Yuuya Kibi
- (Japan) Toshihide Matsui

== Champions ==
=== Singles ===
- (Australia) Sam Groth def. (Russia) Konstantin Kravchuk, 6–7^{(5–7)}, 6–4, 7–6^{(7–3)}

=== Doubles ===
- (Australia) Matthew Ebden / (Chinese Taipei) Wang Chieh-fu def. (Thailand) Sanchai Ratiwatana / (Thailand) Sonchat Ratiwatana, 6–1, 6–4
