= 2014 Santaizi ATP Challenger – Doubles =

Doubles
- 2014 Santaizi ATP Challenger

Final
- Champion: (Australia) Samuel Groth (Australia) Chris Guccione
- Runner-up: (United States) Austin Krajicek (Australia) John-Patrick Smith
- Score: 6–4, 5–7, [10–8]

Events
Singles	Doubles
Santaizi ATP Challenger	· 2015 →

This was the first edition of the tournament.

Samuel Groth and Chris Guccione won the title, defeating Austin Krajicek and John-Patrick Smith in the final, 6–4, 5–7, [10–8].

== Seeds ==
1. (Australia) Samuel Groth / (Australia) Chris Guccione (champions)
2. (United States) Austin Krajicek / (Australia) John-Patrick Smith (final)
3. (Thailand) Sanchai Ratiwatana / (Thailand) Sonchat Ratiwatana (quarterfinals)
4. (Japan) Toshihide Matsui / (United States) Rajeev Ram (semifinals)

== Draw ==
=== Key ===
- Q = Qualifier
- WC = Wild card
- LL = Lucky loser
- Alt = Alternate
- SE = Special exempt
- PR = Protected ranking
- ITF = ITF entry
- JE = Junior exempt
- w/o = Walkover
- r = Retired
- d = Defaulted
- SR = Special ranking

=== Draw ===
First round
1	(Australia) S Groth (Australia) C Guccione	7^{7}	7^{7}
(Australia) J Millman (Australia) L Saville	6^{5}	6^{2}
(Japan) H Moriya (China) D Wu	6	6
WC	(Chinese Taipei) Ho Chih-jen (Chinese Taipei) J-c Hung	3	3
3	(Thailand) Sa Ratiwatana (Thailand) So Ratiwatana	6	6
(Chinese Taipei) C-f Wang (Israel) A Weintraub	4	4
(Switzerland) M Chiudinelli (Japan) T Ito	6	5	[10]
WC	(United States) J Jung (Chinese Taipei) Yang Shao-chi	0	7	[6]
(Slovakia) K Beck (Slovakia) L Lacko	6	3	[10]
(Chinese Taipei) L-c Huang (Japan) Shuichi Sekiguchi	3	6	[7]
(Chinese Taipei) H-y Peng (Chinese Taipei) T-h Yang	6	4	[8]
4	(Japan) T Matsui (United States) R Ram	2	6	[10]
(United Kingdom) J Delgado (Luxembourg) G Müller	6	6
WC	(Chinese Taipei) Chuang Ting-yu (Chinese Taipei) C-y Yu	1	4
(Chinese Taipei) T Chen (Japan) G Soeda	5	1
2	(United States) A Krajicek (Australia) J-P Smith	7	6

Quarterfinals
1	(Australia) S Groth (Australia) C Guccione	6	6
(Japan) H Moriya (China) D Wu	1	4
3	(Thailand) Sa Ratiwatana (Thailand) So Ratiwatana	6^{5}	4
(Switzerland) M Chiudinelli (Japan) T Ito	7^{7}	6
(Slovakia) K Beck (Slovakia) L Lacko	2	3
4	(Japan) T Matsui (United States) R Ram	6	6
(United Kingdom) J Delgado (Luxembourg) G Müller	4	6^{5}
2	(United States) A Krajicek (Australia) J-P Smith	6	7^{7}

Semifinals
1	(Australia) S Groth (Australia) C Guccione	6	6^{5}	[10]
(Switzerland) M Chiudinelli (Japan) T Ito	2	7^{7}	[6]
4	(Japan) T Matsui (United States) R Ram	4	3
2	(United States) A Krajicek (Australia) J-P Smith	6	6

Final
1	(Australia) S Groth (Australia) C Guccione	6	5	[10]
2	(United States) A Krajicek (Australia) J-P Smith	4	7	[8]
