= 2025 Santaizi ATP Challenger – Singles =

Singles
- 2025 Santaizi ATP Challenger

Final
- Champion: (Japan) Yoshihito Nishioka
- Runner-up: (Australia) James Duckworth
- Score: 7–5, 7–6^{(7–5)}

Events
Singles	Doubles
← 2024 ·	Santaizi ATP Challenger	· 2026 →

Adam Walton was the defending champion but chose not to defend his title.

Yoshihito Nishioka won the title after defeating James Duckworth 7–5, 7–6^{(7–5)} in the final.

== Seeds ==
1. (Australia) James Duckworth (final)
2. (Japan) Yoshihito Nishioka (champion)
3. (Austria) Jurij Rodionov (second round)
4. (Hong Kong) Coleman Wong (semifinals)
5. (Australia) James McCabe (semifinals)
6. (Sweden) Elias Ymer (second round)
7. (Chinese Taipei) Hsu Yu-hsiou (second round)
8. (Japan) Yuta Shimizu (second round)

== Draw ==
Key

- Q = Qualifier
- WC = Wild card
- LL = Lucky loser
- Alt = Alternate
- ITF = ITF entry
- PR = Protected ranking
- SR = Special ranking
- SE = Special exempt
- JE = Junior exempt
- JR = Junior Accelerator Programme entrant
- CO = College Accelerator Programme entrant
- NG = Next Gen Accelerator Program entrant
- w/o = Walkover
- r = Retired
- d = Defaulted

=== Finals ===
Semifinals
1	(Australia) James Duckworth	6	6
4	(Hong Kong) Coleman Wong	3	4
5	(Australia) James McCabe	2	7	1
2	(Japan) Yoshihito Nishioka	6	5	6

Final
1	(Australia) James Duckworth	5	6^{5}
2	(Japan) Yoshihito Nishioka	7	7^{7}

=== Top half ===
First round
1	(Australia) J Duckworth	2	7^{7}	6
(Japan) T Daniel	6	6^{2}	2
(India) Sidharth Rawat	4	7^{7}	4
Q	(Czech Republic) M Vrbenský	6	6^{3}	6
(India) M Sasikumar	6^{5}	2
(Japan) K Uchida	7^{7}	6
(Czech Republic) M Gengel	0	6^{8}
8	(Japan) Y Shimizu	6	7^{10}
4	(Hong Kong) C Wong	6	4	7
(Switzerland) L Castelnuovo	4	6	5
(Chinese Taipei) T-h Huang	6	6
(United States) E Zhu	2	1
(France) M Janvier	4	6	7^{9}
(Chinese Taipei) T-l Wu	6	3	6^{7}
Q	(South Korea) U-s Park	4	6	6^{2}
6	(Sweden) E Ymer	6	1	7^{7}

Second round
1	(Australia) J Duckworth	6	6
Q	(Czech Republic) M Vrbenský	3	2
(Japan) K Uchida	6	6
8	(Japan) Y Shimizu	1	2
4	(Hong Kong) C Wong	6	6
(Chinese Taipei) T-h Huang	4	4
(France) M Janvier	7	6^{4}	6
6	(Sweden) E Ymer	5	7^{7}	3

Quarterfinals
1	(Australia) J Duckworth	6	7^{7}
(Japan) K Uchida	3	6^{2}
4	(Hong Kong) C Wong	6	6
(France) M Janvier	4	4

Semifinals
1	(Australia) J Duckworth	6	6
4	(Hong Kong) C Wong	3	4

=== Bottom half ===
First round
5	(Australia) J McCabe	6^{5}	6	7
WC	(Chinese Taipei) Meng Cing-yang	7^{7}	4	5
Q	(Japan) T Ichikawa	3	4
(Austria) N Oberleitner	6	6
Q	(Thailand) W Trongcharoenchaikul	3	1
(Japan) M Imamura	6	6
Q	(South Korea) J-s Nam	6	6^{3}	2
3	(Austria) J Rodionov	2	7^{7}	6
7	(Chinese Taipei) Y-h Hsu	6	3	6
WC	(Chinese Taipei) K-y Lee	3	6	0
(Thailand) K Samrej	3	6^{13}
(Japan) A Santillan	6	7^{15}
WC	(Chinese Taipei) J Jung	6^{5}	6	7^{8}
(France) A Weber	7^{7}	3	6^{6}
Q	(Japan) S Hazawa	4	3
2	(Japan) Y Nishioka	6	6

Second round
5	(Australia) J McCabe	6	6
(Austria) N Oberleitner	4	4
(Japan) M Imamura	6	6
3	(Austria) J Rodionov	4	0
7	(Chinese Taipei) Y-h Hsu	6	3	5
(Japan) A Santillan	3	6	7
WC	(Chinese Taipei) J Jung	5	2
2	(Japan) Y Nishioka	7	6

Quarterfinals
5	(Australia) J McCabe	6	1	6
(Japan) M Imamura	4	6	3
(Japan) A Santillan	2	7	4
2	(Japan) Y Nishioka	6	5	6

Semifinals
5	(Australia) J McCabe	2	7	1
2	(Japan) Y Nishioka	6	5	6
