= 2025 Santaizi ATP Challenger =

- Date: 3–9 November
- Edition: 8th
- Surface: Hard
- Location: Taipei, Taiwan

Champions

Singles
- (Japan) Yoshihito Nishioka

Doubles
- (United States) Nathaniel Lammons / (Netherlands) Jean-Julien Rojer
← 2024 ·	Santaizi ATP Challenger	· 2026 →

The 2025 Santaizi ATP Challenger was a professional tennis tournament played on hard courts. It was the eighth edition of the tournament which was part of the 2025 ATP Challenger Tour. It took place in Taipei, Taiwan between 3 and 9 November 2025.

== Singles main-draw entrants ==
=== Seeds ===
Country	Player	Rank^{1}	Seed
AUS	James Duckworth	112	1
JPN	Yoshihito Nishioka	137	2
AUT	Jurij Rodionov	156	3
HKG	Coleman Wong	161	4
AUS	James McCabe	192	5
SWE	Elias Ymer	204	6
TPE	Hsu Yu-hsiou	229	7
JPN	Yuta Shimizu	241	8

- ^{1} Rankings are as of 27 October 2025.

=== Other entrants ===
The following players received wildcards into the singles main draw:

- (Chinese Taipei) Jason Jung
- (Chinese Taipei) Lee Kuan-yi
- (Chinese Taipei) Meng Cing-yang

The following players received entry from the qualifying draw:

- (Japan) Shinji Hazawa
- (Japan) Taisei Ichikawa
- (South Korea) Nam Ji-sung
- (South Korea) Park Ui-sung
- (Thailand) Wishaya Trongcharoenchaikul
- (Czech Republic) Michael Vrbenský

== Champions ==
=== Singles ===
- (Japan) Yoshihito Nishioka def. (Australia) James Duckworth 7–5, 7–6^{(7–5)}.

=== Doubles ===
- (United States) Nathaniel Lammons / (Netherlands) Jean-Julien Rojer def. (Japan) Kaito Uesugi / (Japan) Seita Watanabe 7–6^{(7–4)}, 7–6^{(8–6)}.
