= 2017 Santaizi ATP Challenger =

- Date: 17 – 23 April
- Edition: 4th
- Draw: 32S / 16D
- Surface: Carpet (indoors)
- Location: Taipei, Taiwan

Champions

Singles
- (Chinese Taipei) Lu Yen-hsun

Doubles
- (Switzerland) Marco Chiudinelli / (Croatia) Franko Škugor
← 2016 ·	Santaizi ATP Challenger	· 2018 →

The 2017 Santaizi ATP Challenger will be a professional tennis tournament played on indoor carpet courts. It will be the fourth edition of the tournament which will be part of the 2017 ATP Challenger Tour. It will take place in Taipei, Taiwan between 17 and 23 April.

== Point distribution ==
Event	W	F	SF	QF	Round of 16	Round of 32	Q	Q2
Singles	110	65	40	20	9	0	5	0
Doubles	110	65	40	20	0	—	—	—

== Singles main draw entrants ==
=== Seeds ===
Country	Player	Rank^{1}	Seed
CYP	Marcos Baghdatis	54	1
TPE	Lu Yen-hsun	62	2
RUS	Konstantin Kravchuk	101	3
ISR	Dudi Sela	104	4
SVK	Lukáš Lacko	108	5
CAN	Vasek Pospisil	119	6
KOR	Lee Duck-hee	130	7
JPN	Go Soeda	152	8

- ^{1} Rankings are as of April 10, 2017.

=== Other entrants ===
The following players received wildcards into the singles main draw:

- (Cyprus) Marcos Baghdatis
- (Chinese Taipei) Lee Kuan-yi
- (Chinese Taipei) Jimmy Wang
- (Chinese Taipei) Yang Tsung-hua

The following players received entry from the qualifying draw:

- (Germany) Matthias Bachinger
- (Australia) Matthew Ebden
- (India) Sasikumar Mukund
- (South Africa) Ruan Roelofse

== Champions ==
=== Singles ===
- (Chinese Taipei) Lu Yen-hsun def. (Japan) Tatsuma Ito 6–1, 7–6^{(7–4)}.

=== Doubles ===
- (Switzerland) Marco Chiudinelli / (Croatia) Franko Škugor def. (Thailand) Sanchai Ratiwatana / (Thailand) Sonchat Ratiwatana 4–6, 6–2, [10–5].
