= 2019 Santaizi ATP Challenger – Singles =

Singles
- 2019 Santaizi ATP Challenger

Final
- Champion: (Austria) Dennis Novak
- Runner-up: (Ukraine) Sergiy Stakhovsky
- Score: 6–2, 6–4

Events
| Singles | Doubles |
- Santaizi ATP Challenger

Yuki Bhambri was the defending champion but chose not to defend his title.

Dennis Novak won the title after defeating Sergiy Stakhovsky 6–2, 6–4 in the final.

== Seeds ==
All seeds receive a bye into the second round.

1. (South Africa) Lloyd Harris (third round)
2. (Russia) Evgeny Donskoy (second round)
3. (Ukraine) Sergiy Stakhovsky (final)
4. (Slovakia) Lukáš Lacko (third round)
5. (Germany) Matthias Bachinger (second round)
6. (Poland) Kamil Majchrzak (third round)
7. (Chinese Taipei) Jason Jung (quarterfinals)
8. (Cyprus) Marcos Baghdatis (second round, retired)
9. (India) Ramkumar Ramanathan (quarterfinals)
10. (Japan) Tatsuma Ito (quarterfinals)
11. (Austria) Dennis Novak (champion)
12. (Australia) James Duckworth (third round)
13. (South Korea) Kwon Soon-woo (semifinals)
14. (Japan) Hiroki Moriya (second round)
15. (Japan) Yūichi Sugita (quarterfinals)
16. (France) Maxime Janvier (third round)

== Draw ==
Key

- Q = Qualifier
- WC = Wild card
- LL = Lucky loser
- Alt = Alternate
- ITF = ITF entry
- PR = Protected ranking
- SR = Special ranking
- SE = Special exempt
- JE = Junior exempt
- JR = Junior Accelerator Programme entrant
- CO = College Accelerator Programme entrant
- NG = Next Gen Accelerator Program entrant
- w/o = Walkover
- r = Retired
- d = Defaulted

=== Finals ===
Quarterfinals
13 | (South Korea) Kwon Soon-woo | 7^{8} | 6
9 | (India) Ramkumar Ramanathan | 6^{6} | 3
15 | (Japan) Yūichi Sugita | 6^{5} | 3
11 | (Austria) Dennis Novak | 7^{7} | 6
10 | (Japan) Tatsuma Ito | 6^{3} | 7^{7} | 4
3 | (Ukraine) Sergiy Stakhovsky | 7^{7} | 6^{5} | 6
7 | (Chinese Taipei) Jason Jung | 6^{3} | 1
(Japan) Go Soeda | 7^{7} | 6

Semifinals
13 | (South Korea) Kwon Soon-woo | 3 | 4
11 | (Austria) Dennis Novak | 6 | 6
3 | (Ukraine) Sergiy Stakhovsky | 7^{7} | 7^{7}
(Japan) Go Soeda | 6^{4} | 6^{4}

Final
11 | (Austria) Dennis Novak | 6 | 6
3 | (Ukraine) Sergiy Stakhovsky | 2 | 4

=== Top half ===
==== Section 1 ====
First round
LL | (United Kingdom) B Klein | 6 | 7
Q | (Chinese Taipei) C-p Hsieh | 3 | 5
Q | (India) S Balaji | 4 | 7^{7} | 4
(Australia) L Saville | 6 | 6^{4} | 6
(South Korea) Y-s Chung | 6 | 6^{5} | 4
(Australia) M Banes | 2 | 7^{7} | 6
(United States) C Altamirano | 5 | 7 | 3
WC | (Chinese Taipei) Lo Chien-hsun | 7 | 5 | 6

Second round
1 | (South Africa) L Harris | 7^{9} | 6
LL | (United Kingdom) B Klein | 6^{7} | 2
(Australia) L Saville | 4 | 4
13 | (South Korea) S-w Kwon | 6 | 6
9 | (India) R Ramanathan | 6 | 6
(Australia) M Banes | 3 | 2
WC | (Chinese Taipei) C-h Lo | 6^{1} | 4
8 | (Cyprus) M Baghdatis | 7^{7} | 2^{r}

Third round
1 | (South Africa) L Harris | 5 | 7^{7} | 3
13 | (South Korea) S-w Kwon | 7 | 6^{3} | 6
9 | (India) R Ramanathan | 4 | 6 | 6
WC | (Chinese Taipei) C-h Lo | 6 | 3 | 2

Quarterfinals
13 | (South Korea) S-w Kwon | 7^{8} | 6
9 | (India) R Ramanathan | 6^{6} | 3

==== Section 2 ====
First round
(Switzerland) M-A Hüsler | 7^{7} | 6^{5} | 6
(Australia) M Purcell | 6^{4} | 7^{7} | 1
(India) S Mukund | 3 | 4
(Turkey) C İlkel | 6 | 6
(Japan) Renta Tokuda | 6 | 6
(Japan) Y Takahashi | 2 | 1
(Japan) K Uchida | 6 | 6
(South Korea) D-h Lee | 4 | 4

Second round
4 | (Slovakia) L Lacko | 4 | 7^{7} | 6
(Switzerland) M-A Hüsler | 6 | 6^{0} | 2
(Turkey) C İlkel | 5 | 3
15 | (Japan) Y Sugita | 7 | 6
11 | (Austria) D Novak | 6 | 6
(Japan) R Tokuda | 2 | 2
(Japan) K Uchida | 7^{8} | 6
5 | (Germany) M Bachinger | 6^{6} | 2

Third round
4 | (Slovakia) L Lacko | 6 | 3 | 4
15 | (Japan) Y Sugita | 3 | 6 | 6
11 | (Austria) D Novak | 6 | 6^{6} | 6
(Japan) K Uchida | 3 | 7^{8} | 4

Quarterfinals
15 | (Japan) Y Sugita | 6^{5} | 3
11 | (Austria) D Novak | 7^{7} | 6

=== Bottom half ===
==== Section 3 ====
First round
(Australia) A Santillan | 6 | 7^{7}
WC | (Chinese Taipei) Y-h Hsu | 4 | 6^{5}
WC | (Chinese Taipei) K-y Lee | 6 | 6
WC | (Chinese Taipei) R Ho | 4 | 2
PR | (Ukraine) I Marchenko | 6 | 3 | 4
(France) TK Wang | 4 | 6 | 6
(France) S Robert | 6 | 6
(Portugal) G Oliveira | 3 | 4

Second round
6 | (Poland) K Majchrzak | 6 | 6
(Australia) A Santillan | 3 | 1
WC | (Chinese Taipei) K-y Lee | 3 | 3
10 | (Japan) T Ito | 6 | 6
16 | (France) M Janvier | 6 | 7
(France) TK Wang | 4 | 5
(France) S Robert | 6^{2} | 2
3 | (Ukraine) S Stakhovsky | 7^{7} | 6

Third round
6 | (Poland) K Majchrzak | 7^{7} | 6^{7} | 6^{2}
10 | (Japan) T Ito | 6^{3} | 7^{9} | 7^{7}
16 | (France) M Janvier | 5 | 4
3 | (Ukraine) S Stakhovsky | 7 | 6

Quarterfinals
10 | (Japan) T Ito | 6^{3} | 7^{7} | 4
3 | (Ukraine) S Stakhovsky | 7^{7} | 6^{5} | 6

==== Section 4 ====
First round
(Chinese Taipei) T-l Wu | 6 | 6
WC | (Chinese Taipei) C-y Yu | 4 | 3
(Japan) Makoto Ochi | 4 | 3
(Chinese Taipei) T-h Yang | 6 | 6
(Australia) A Harris | 7^{7} | 4 | 6
(India) S Myneni | 6^{4} | 6 | 2
(Japan) G Soeda | 6^{8} | 6 | 6
(Japan) Y Uchiyama | 7^{10} | 4 | 2

Second round
7 | (Chinese Taipei) J Jung | 6 | 6
(Chinese Taipei) T-l Wu | 4 | 4
(Chinese Taipei) T-h Yang | 6^{6} | 0
12 | (Australia) J Duckworth | 7^{8} | 6
14 | (Japan) H Moriya | 6 | 4 | 4
(Australia) A Harris | 4 | 6 | 6
(Japan) G Soeda | 4 | 6 | 7^{7}
2 | (Russia) E Donskoy | 6 | 4 | 6^{5}

Third round
7 | (Chinese Taipei) J Jung | 6 | 6
12 | (Australia) J Duckworth | 2 | 2
(Australia) A Harris | 2 | 3
(Japan) G Soeda | 6 | 6

Quarterfinals
7 | (Chinese Taipei) J Jung | 6^{3} | 1
(Japan) G Soeda | 7^{7} | 6
