= 2014 Santaizi ATP Challenger =

Tennis tournament in Taipei, Taiwan

- Date: 28 April – 4 May
- Edition: 1st
- Draw: 32S / 16D
- Prize money: $75,000
- Surface: Carpet (indoor)
- Location: Taipei, Taiwan

Champions

Singles
- (Luxembourg) Gilles Müller

Doubles
- (Australia) Samuel Groth / (Australia) Chris Guccione
Santaizi ATP Challenger	· 2015 →

The 2014 Santaizi ATP Challenger was a professional tennis tournament played on carpet courts. It was the first edition of the tournament which was part of the 2014 ATP Challenger Tour. It took place in Taipei, Taiwan between 28 April and 4 May 2014.

== Singles main-draw entrants ==
=== Seeds ===
Country	Player	Rank	Seed
TPE	Lu Yen-hsun	49	1
SVK	Lukáš Lacko	57	2
USA	Rajeev Ram	127	3
JPN	Go Soeda	136	4
AUS	Samuel Groth	138	5
JPN	Tatsuma Ito	146	6
TPE	Jimmy Wang	151	7
JPN	Hiroki Moriya	173	8

=== Other entrants ===
The following players received wildcards into the singles main draw:

- (Chinese Taipei) Wang Chieh-fu
- (Chinese Taipei) Yu Cheng-yu
- (Chinese Taipei) Yang Shao-chi
- (Chinese Taipei) Hung Jui-chen

The following players received entry from the qualifying draw:

- (Chinese Taipei) Chuang Ting-yu
- (Chinese Taipei) Peng Hsien-yin
- (Australia) Blake Mott
- (Chinese Taipei) Tang Chih-chun

== Doubles main-draw entrants ==
=== Seeds ===
Country	Player	Country	Player	Rank	Seed
AUS	Samuel Groth	AUS	Chris Guccione	148	1
USA	Austin Krajicek	AUS	John-Patrick Smith	166	2
THA	Sanchai Ratiwatana	THA	Sonchat Ratiwatana	186	3
JPN	Toshihide Matsui	USA	Rajeev Ram	334	4

=== Other entrants ===
The following pairs received wildcards into the doubles main draw:

- (Chinese Taipei) Ho Chih-jen / (Chinese Taipei) Hung Jui-chen
- (United States) Jason Jung / (Chinese Taipei) Yang Shao-chi
- (Chinese Taipei) Chuang Ting-yu / (Chinese Taipei) Yu Cheng-yu

== Champions ==
=== Singles ===
- (Luxembourg) Gilles Müller def. (Australia) John-Patrick Smith, 6–3, 6–3

=== Doubles ===
- (Australia) Samuel Groth / (Australia) Chris Guccione def. (United States) Austin Krajicek / (Australia) John-Patrick Smith, 6–4, 5–7, [10–8]
