= 2019 OEC Kaohsiung – Singles =

Singles
- 2019 OEC Kaohsiung

Final
- Champion: (Australia) John Millman
- Runner-up: (Australia) Marc Polmans
- Score: 6–4, 6–2

Events
Singles	Doubles
- OEC Kaohsiung

The 2019 OEC Kaohsiung-Singles was a men's tennis tournament held from September 16 to September 22, 2019, at Kaohsiung, Taiwan. Gaël Monfils was the defending champion but chose not to defend his title.

John Millman won the title after defeating Marc Polmans 6–4, 6–2 in the final.

== Seeds ==
All seeds receive a bye into the second round.

1. (Poland) Kamil Majchrzak (third round)
2. (India) Prajnesh Gunneswaran (third round)
3. (Australia) John Millman (champion)
4. (Australia) Bernard Tomic (withdrew)
5. (Czech Republic) Jiří Veselý (quarterfinals)
6. (Chinese Taipei) Jason Jung (third round)
7. (Japan) Go Soeda (third round)
8. (Japan) Yūichi Sugita (third round)
9. (Australia) Alex Bolt (quarterfinals)
10. (Australia) Marc Polmans (final)
11. (Japan) Yasutaka Uchiyama (third round)
12. (Canada) Steven Diez (semifinals)
13. (Australia) Andrew Harris (third round)
14. (Spain) Enrique López Pérez (quarterfinals)
15. (Japan) Yosuke Watanuki (second round)
16. (Japan) Hiroki Moriya (third round)

== Draw ==
Key

- Q = Qualifier
- WC = Wild card
- LL = Lucky loser
- Alt = Alternate
- ITF = ITF entry
- PR = Protected ranking
- SR = Special ranking
- SE = Special exempt
- JE = Junior exempt
- JR = Junior Accelerator Programme entrant
- CO = College Accelerator Programme entrant
- NG = Next Gen Accelerator Program entrant
- w/o = Walkover
- r = Retired
- d = Defaulted

=== Finals ===
Quarterfinals
(Portugal) Frederico Ferreira Silva	6	7^{8}
9	(Australia) Alex Bolt	4	6^{6}
(South Korea) Nam Ji-sung	6	1	4
10	(Australia) Marc Polmans	3	6	6
5	(Czech Republic) Jiří Veselý	6^{5}	1
3	(Australia) John Millman	7^{7}	6
12	(Canada) Steven Diez	6	7^{8}
14	(Spain) Enrique López Pérez	3	6^{6}

Semifinals
(Portugal) Frederico Ferreira Silva	1	7	5
10	(Australia) Marc Polmans	6	5	7
3	(Australia) John Millman	2	6	6
12	(Canada) Steven Diez	6	3	2

Final
10	(Australia) Marc Polmans	4	2
3	(Australia) John Millman	6	6

=== Top half ===
==== Section 1 ====
First round
(Australia) H Bourchier	3	6	6
Q	(Japan) Y Takahashi	6	1	2
(Chinese Taipei) T-l Wu	6^{3}	3
(Portugal) F Ferreira Silva	7^{7}	6
(South Korea) Y-s Chung	4	3
PR	(Netherlands) Miliaan Niesten	6	6
(Japan) Shintaro Imai	3	4
(Japan) Renta Tokuda	6	6

Second round
1	(Poland) K Majchrzak	6	6
(Australia) H Bourchier	4	4
(Portugal) F Ferreira Silva	7^{8}	1	6
15	(Japan) Yo Watanuki	6^{6}	6	3
9	(Australia) A Bolt	7	6
PR	(Netherlands) M Niesten	5	4
(Japan) R Tokuda	2	3
6	(Chinese Taipei) J Jung	6	6

Third round
1	(Poland) K Majchrzak	6^{3}	5
(Portugal) F Ferreira Silva	7^{7}	7
9	(Australia) A Bolt	7	4	7^{8}
6	(Chinese Taipei) J Jung	5	6	6^{6}

Quarterfinals
(Portugal) F Ferreira Silva	6	7^{8}
9	(Australia) A Bolt	4	6^{6}

==== Section 2 ====
First round
(South Korea) J-s Nam	4	6	3
WC	(Chinese Taipei) C-y Yu	6	2	1^{r}
WC	(Chinese Taipei) C-p Hsieh	2	2
(Chinese Taipei) T-h Yang	6	6
(India) S Mukund	7^{10}	3	7^{8}
(Portugal) G Oliveira	6^{8}	6	6^{6}
LL	(Chinese Taipei) K-y Lee	2	3
(Chinese Taipei) C-h Tseng	6	6

Second round
LL	(Chinese Taipei) Tsai Chang-lin	4	1
(South Korea) J-s Nam	6	6
(Chinese Taipei) T-h Yang	6^{6}	3
13	(Australia) A Harris	7^{8}	6
10	(Australia) M Polmans	6	6
(India) S Mukund	4	1
(Chinese Taipei) C-h Tseng	2	3
7	(Japan) G Soeda	6	6

Third round
(South Korea) J-s Nam	6	6
13	(Australia) A Harris	2	2
10	(Australia) M Polmans	1	7^{11}	6
7	(Japan) G Soeda	6	6^{9}	3

Quarterfinals
(South Korea) J-s Nam	6	1	4
10	(Australia) M Polmans	3	6	6

=== Bottom half ===
==== Section 3 ====
First round
(Russia) T Gabashvili	6	5	6
(United States) C Altamirano	3	7	4
(Australia) A Santillan	6	7
WC	(Chinese Taipei) Y-h Hsu	3	5
(United Kingdom) J Ward	4	6	4
(Japan) K Uchida	6	0	6
(Japan) R Noguchi	6	6
WC	(Chinese Taipei) Lo Chien-hsun	2	2

Second round
5	(Czech Republic) J Veselý	7^{8}	6
(Russia) T Gabashvili	6^{6}	1
(Australia) A Santillan	6^{5}	3
11	(Japan) Y Uchiyama	7^{7}	6
16	(Japan) H Moriya	6	6
(Japan) K Uchida	4	2
(Japan) R Noguchi	1	2
3	(Australia) J Millman	6	6

Third round
5	(Czech Republic) J Veselý	7	6
11	(Japan) Y Uchiyama	5	2
16	(Japan) H Moriya	2	6^{2}
3	(Australia) J Millman	6	7^{7}

Quarterfinals
5	(Czech Republic) J Veselý	6^{5}	1
3	(Australia) J Millman	7^{7}	6

==== Section 4 ====
First round
(India) S Myneni	6	1	3
(Australia) M Purcell	3	6	6
Q	(Japan) Jumpei Yamasaki	6^{7}	4
(Australia) L Saville	7^{9}	6
(Australia) Jacob Grills	4	6	2
(United States) E King	6	3	6
WC	(Chinese Taipei) R Ho	6^{6}	3
(Japan) Shuichi Sekiguchi	7^{8}	6

Second round
8	(Japan) Y Sugita	7^{7}	4	6
(Australia) M Purcell	6^{2}	6	2
(Australia) L Saville	6	4	1
12	(Canada) S Diez	3	6	6
14	(Spain) E López Pérez	6	6
(United States) E King	3	3
(Japan) S Sekiguchi	3	2
2	(India) P Gunneswaran	6	6

Third round
8	(Japan) Y Sugita	2	4
12	(Canada) S Diez	6	6
14	(Spain) E López Pérez	5	7	6
2	(India) P Gunneswaran	7	5	4

Quarterfinals
12	(Canada) S Diez	6	7^{8}
14	(Spain) E López Pérez	3	6^{6}
