= 2016 Santaizi ATP Challenger – Doubles =

Doubles
- 2016 Santaizi ATP Challenger

Final
- Champion: (Chinese Taipei) Hsieh Cheng-peng (Chinese Taipei) Yang Tsung-hua
- Runner-up: (Denmark) Frederik Nielsen (Republic of Ireland) David O'Hare
- Score: 7–6^{(8–6)}, 6–4

Events
Singles	Doubles
← 2015 ·	Santaizi ATP Challenger	· 2017 →

Matthew Ebden and Wang Chieh-fu were the Santaizi ATP Challenger defending champions in 2016 but only Wang chose to defend his title, partnering Hung Jui-chen. Wang and Hung lost in the first round to Hsieh Cheng-peng and Yang Tsung-hua.

Hsieh and Yang won the title after defeating Frederik Nielsen and David O'Hare 7–6^{(8–6)}, 6–4 in the final.

== Seeds ==
1. (Australia) Sam Groth / (India) Leander Paes (first round)
2. (Thailand) Sanchai Ratiwatana / (Thailand) Sonchat Ratiwatana (first round)
3. (China) Gong Maoxin / (Chinese Taipei) Yi Chu-huan (first round)
4. (Denmark) Frederik Nielsen / (Republic of Ireland) David O'Hare (final)

== Draw ==
=== Key ===
- Q = Qualifier
- WC = Wild card
- LL = Lucky loser
- Alt = Alternate
- SE = Special exempt
- PR = Protected ranking
- ITF = ITF entry
- JE = Junior exempt
- w/o = Walkover
- r = Retired
- d = Defaulted
- SR = Special ranking

First round
1	(Australia) S Groth (India) L Paes	6^{2}	6	[9]
(Japan) T Ito (Japan) Shuichi Sekiguchi	7^{7}	3	[11]
(Japan) T Matsui (Japan) G Soeda	6^{5}	6	[12]
WC	(Chinese Taipei) Lin Liang-yu (Chinese Taipei) Lin Wei-de	7^{7}	3	[10]
3	(China) M Gong (Chinese Taipei) C-h Yi	3	2
(Australia) M Barton (Australia) L Saville	6	6
(Chinese Taipei) C-p Hsieh (Chinese Taipei) T-h Yang	6	7
WC	(Chinese Taipei) J-c Hung (Chinese Taipei) C-f Wang	4	5
(Japan) Y Sugita (Israel) A Weintraub	3	4
(Switzerland) M Chiudinelli (Ukraine) S Stakhovsky	6	6
(Chinese Taipei) T Chen (Chinese Taipei) L-c Huang	2	6^{5}
4	(Denmark) F Nielsen (Republic of Ireland) D O'Hare	6	7^{7}
WC	(Chinese Taipei) J Wang (Chinese Taipei) T-l Wu	5	2
(Russia) A Kudryavtsev (Poland) M Przysiężny	7	6
(Chinese Taipei) J Jung (Chinese Taipei) H-y Peng	7	7^{7}
2	(Thailand) Sa Ratiwatana (Thailand) So Ratiwatana	5	6^{3}

Quarterfinals
(Japan) T Ito (Japan) S Sekiguchi	7^{7}	6
(Japan) T Matsui (Japan) G Soeda	6^{1}	1
(Australia) M Barton (Australia) L Saville	2	4
(Chinese Taipei) C-p Hsieh (Chinese Taipei) T-h Yang	6	6
(Switzerland) M Chiudinelli (Ukraine) S Stakhovsky	2	4
4	(Denmark) F Nielsen (Republic of Ireland) D O'Hare	6	6
(Russia) A Kudryavtsev (Poland) M Przysiężny	6	3	[7]
(Chinese Taipei) J Jung (Chinese Taipei) H-y Peng	2	6	[10]

Semifinals
(Japan) T Ito (Japan) S Sekiguchi	0	6^{3}
(Chinese Taipei) C-p Hsieh (Chinese Taipei) T-h Yang	6	7^{7}
4	(Denmark) F Nielsen (Republic of Ireland) D O'Hare	6	6
(Chinese Taipei) J Jung (Chinese Taipei) H-y Peng	3	1

Final
(Chinese Taipei) C-p Hsieh (Chinese Taipei) T-h Yang	7^{8}	6
4	(Denmark) F Nielsen (Republic of Ireland) D O'Hare	6^{6}	4
