= 2015 Santaizi ATP Challenger – Doubles =

Doubles
- 2015 Santaizi ATP Challenger

Final
- Champion: (Australia) Matthew Ebden (Chinese Taipei) Wang Chieh-fu
- Runner-up: (Thailand) Sanchai Ratiwatana (Thailand) Sonchat Ratiwatana
- Score: 6–1, 6–4

Events
Singles	Doubles
← 2014 ·	Santaizi ATP Challenger	· 2016 →

Samuel Groth and Chris Guccione were the defending champions, but Guccione did not participate. Groth partnered with Ryan Harrison, but they withdrew in the semifinals.

Matthew Ebden and Wang Chieh-fu won the title, defeating Sanchai and Sonchat Ratiwatana, 6–1, 6–4.

== Seeds ==
1. (Australia) Sam Groth / (United States) Ryan Harrison (semifinals, withdrew)
2. (Thailand) Sanchai Ratiwatana / (Thailand) Sonchat Ratiwatana (final)
3. (United Kingdom) Brydan Klein / (Chinese Taipei) Lee Hsin-han (quarterfinals)
4. (Chinese Taipei) Chen Ti / (India) Ramkumar Ramanathan (first round)

== Draw ==
=== Key ===
- Q = Qualifier
- WC = Wild card
- LL = Lucky loser
- Alt = Alternate
- SE = Special exempt
- PR = Protected ranking
- ITF = ITF entry
- JE = Junior exempt
- w/o = Walkover
- r = Retired
- d = Defaulted
- SR = Special ranking

First round
1	(Australia) S Groth (United States) R Harrison	7	6
WC	(Chinese Taipei) Lin Liang-yu (Chinese Taipei) T-l Wu	5	4
(United States) D Kudla (Thailand) D Udomchoke	7^{7}	5	[11]
(Russia) K Kravchuk (Ukraine) I Marchenko	6^{5}	7	[9]
3	(United Kingdom) B Klein (Chinese Taipei) H-h Lee	3	6	[10]
WC	(Chinese Taipei) Ho Chih-jen (Chinese Taipei) J-c Hung	6	4	[4]
(Australia) M Ebden (Chinese Taipei) C-f Wang	7	6
(Japan) T Ito (Slovakia) L Lacko	5	2
(Japan) T Matsui (Japan) G Soeda	6	6
(Japan) H Moriya (China) Z Zhang	1	4
WC	(Chinese Taipei) C-p Hsieh (Chinese Taipei) C-h Yi	6	6
4	(Chinese Taipei) T Chen (India) R Ramanathan	3	0
(Japan) Yuuya Kibi (Japan) T Niki	3	6	[7]
(India) Y Bhambri (India) S Myneni	6	2	[10]
(Australia) M Barton (United States) M Giron	2	5
2	(Thailand) Sa Ratiwatana (Thailand) So Ratiwatana	6	7

Quarterfinals
1	(Australia) S Groth (United States) R Harrison	6	7^{7}
(United States) D Kudla (Thailand) D Udomchoke	3	6^{4}
3	(United Kingdom) B Klein (Chinese Taipei) H-h Lee	1	4
(Australia) M Ebden (Chinese Taipei) C-f Wang	6	6
(Japan) T Matsui (Japan) G Soeda	3	6	[10]
WC	(Chinese Taipei) C-p Hsieh (Chinese Taipei) C-h Yi	6	3	[12]
(India) Y Bhambri (India) S Myneni	6^{3}	6	[7]
2	(Thailand) Sa Ratiwatana (Thailand) So Ratiwatana	7^{7}	4	[10]

Semifinals
1	(Australia) S Groth (United States) R Harrison	w/o
(Australia) M Ebden (Chinese Taipei) C-f Wang
WC	(Chinese Taipei) C-p Hsieh (Chinese Taipei) C-h Yi	7^{11}	4	[5]
2	(Thailand) Sa Ratiwatana (Thailand) So Ratiwatana	6^{9}	6	[10]

Final
(Australia) M Ebden (Chinese Taipei) C-f Wang	6	6
2	(Thailand) Sa Ratiwatana (Thailand) So Ratiwatana	1	4
