= 2026 Santaizi ATP Challenger – Singles =

Singles
- 2026 Santaizi ATP Challenger

Final
- Champion: (Japan) Yosuke Watanuki
- Runner-up: (Czech Republic) Jan Kumstát
- Score: 7–6^{(7–2)}, 7–5

Events
Singles	Doubles
- Santaizi ATP Challenger

Yoshihito Nishioka was the defending champion but chose not to defend his title.

Yosuke Watanuki won the title after defeating Jan Kumstát 7–6^{(7–2)}, 7–5 in the final.

== Seeds ==
1. (Hong Kong) Coleman Wong (semifinals)
2. (Japan) Sho Shimabukuro (second round)
3. (South Africa) Lloyd Harris (first round)
4. (Australia) Aleksandar Vukic (withdrew)
5. (Japan) Rei Sakamoto (withdrew)
6. (France) Alexandre Müller (quarterfinals)
7. (Greece) Stefanos Sakellaridis (first round)
8. (Austria) Joel Schwärzler (first round)

== Draw ==
Key

- Q = Qualifier
- WC = Wild card
- LL = Lucky loser
- Alt = Alternate
- ITF = ITF entry
- PR = Protected ranking
- SR = Special ranking
- SE = Special exempt
- JE = Junior exempt
- JR = Junior Accelerator Programme entrant
- CO = College Accelerator Programme entrant
- NG = Next Gen Accelerator Program entrant
- w/o = Walkover
- r = Retired
- d = Defaulted

=== Finals ===
Semifinals
1	(Hong Kong) Coleman Wong	6^{5}	6^{6}
Q	(Japan) Yosuke Watanuki	7^{7}	7^{8}
Q	(Japan) Yuta Shimizu	5	4
(Czech Republic) Jan Kumstát	7	6

Final
Q	(Japan) Yosuke Watanuki	7^{7}	7
(Czech Republic) Jan Kumstát	6^{2}	5

=== Top half ===
First round
1	(Hong Kong) C Wong	6	6
WC	(Chinese Taipei) T-h Huang	1	0
WC	(Chinese Taipei) T-l Wu	6^{4}	6^{8}
Q	(Chinese Taipei) Hou Chun-chien	7^{7}	7^{10}
(Denmark) CE Overbeck	7^{7}	6
(Chinese Taipei) C-h Tseng	6^{5}	4
(Australia) J McCabe	3	5
LL	(Thailand) K Samrej	6	7
3	(South Africa) L Harris	2	4
Q	(Japan) Y Watanuki	6	6
Q	(Japan) M Imamura	6	6
LL	(Malaysia) Mitsuki Wei Kang Leong	4	4
(United Kingdom) C Broom	6	6
(United Kingdom) L Broady	2	4
SE	Y Demin	4	3
6	(France) A Müller	6	6

Second round
1	(Hong Kong) C Wong	6	7
Q	(Chinese Taipei) C-c Hou	2	5
(Denmark) CE Overbeck	4	3
LL	(Thailand) K Samrej	6	6
Q	(Japan) Y Watanuki	6	6
Q	(Japan) M Imamura	1	1
(United Kingdom) C Broom	6	6^{12}	2
6	(France) A Müller	4	7^{14}	6

Quarterfinals
1	(Hong Kong) C Wong	7	6
LL	(Thailand) K Samrej	5	2
Q	(Japan) Y Watanuki	6	6^{5}	6
6	(France) A Müller	4	7^{7}	1

Semifinals
1	(Hong Kong) C Wong	6^{5}	6^{6}
Q	(Japan) Y Watanuki	7^{7}	7^{8}

=== Bottom half ===
First round
7	(Greece) S Sakellaridis	5	4
Q	(Japan) Y Shimizu	7	6
(Poland) D Michalski	3	4
(Denmark) A Holmgren	6	6
(United States) K Smith	6	3	4
Q	(Australia) Ja Delaney	3	6	6
Alt	(Chinese Taipei) Y-h Hsu	1	6	4
Q	(Australia) O Jasika	6	3	6
8	(Austria) J Schwärzler	5	6	6^{2}
(Czech Republic) J Kumstát	7	3	7^{7}
WC	(Chinese Taipei) Chen Kuan-shou	2	2
(United Kingdom) B Harris	6	6
(France) H Mayot	6	7^{7}
P Bar Biryukov	4	6^{4}
(Croatia) M Poljičak	4	6^{5}
2	(Japan) S Shimabukuro	6	7^{7}

Second round
Q	(Japan) Y Shimizu	7^{13}	6
(Denmark) A Holmgren	6^{11}	4
Q	(Australia) Ja Delaney	6	6^{6}	6^{8}
Q	(Australia) O Jasika	4	7^{8}	7^{10}
(Czech Republic) J Kumstát	7^{10}	6
(United Kingdom) B Harris	6^{8}	4
(France) H Mayot	6	3	7^{7}
2	(Japan) S Shimabukuro	4	6	6^{3}

Quarterfinals
Q	(Japan) Y Shimizu	6	6
Q	(Australia) O Jasika	2	2
(Czech Republic) J Kumstát	3	7^{7}	6
(France) H Mayot	6	6^{5}	4

Semifinals
Q	(Japan) Y Shimizu	5	4
(Czech Republic) J Kumstát	7	6
