= 2016 Santaizi ATP Challenger – Singles =

Singles
- 2016 Santaizi ATP Challenger

Final
- Champion: (United Kingdom) Daniel Evans
- Runner-up: (Russia) Konstantin Kravchuk
- Score: 3–6, 6–4, 6–4

Events
Singles	Doubles
- Santaizi ATP Challenger

Sam Groth was the defending champion but lost in the first round to Yuya Kibi.

Daniel Evans won the title after defeating Konstantin Kravchuk 3–6, 6–4, 6–4 in the final.

== Seeds ==
1. (Lithuania) Ričardas Berankis (semifinals)
2. (Australia) Sam Groth (first round)
3. (Japan) Tatsuma Ito (quarterfinals)
4. (Japan) Yūichi Sugita (first round)
5. (Ukraine) Sergiy Stakhovsky (quarterfinals)
6. (United Kingdom) Daniel Evans (champion)
7. (Japan) Go Soeda (first round)
8. (Russia) Konstantin Kravchuk (final)

== Draw ==
Key

- Q = Qualifier
- WC = Wild card
- LL = Lucky loser
- Alt = Alternate
- ITF = ITF entry
- PR = Protected ranking
- SR = Special ranking
- SE = Special exempt
- JE = Junior exempt
- JR = Junior Accelerator Programme entrant
- CO = College Accelerator Programme entrant
- NG = Next Gen Accelerator Program entrant
- w/o = Walkover
- r = Retired
- d = Defaulted

=== Finals ===
Semifinals
1	(Lithuania) Ričardas Berankis	3	6^{5}
6	(United Kingdom) Daniel Evans	6	7^{7}
8	(Russia) Konstantin Kravchuk	6	6
(United Kingdom) Liam Broady	2	4

Final
6	(United Kingdom) Daniel Evans	3	6	6
8	(Russia) Konstantin Kravchuk	6	4	4

=== Top half ===
First round
1	(Lithuania) R Berankis	6	6
(Australia) L Saville	2	3
(Australia) B Mitchell	6	7^{7}
WC	(Chinese Taipei) C-h Yi	2	6^{3}
(Chinese Taipei) J Jung	6	6
(Chinese Taipei) T-h Yang	4	1
(Poland) M Przysiężny	7^{9}	5	1
5	(Ukraine) S Stakhovsky	6^{7}	7	6
4	(Japan) Y Sugita	2	7^{7}	1
(Russia) A Kudryavtsev	6	6^{4}	6
Q	(Australia) M Matosevic	6	6
WC	(Chinese Taipei) T-l Wu	3	1
(Chinese Taipei) T Chen	4	2
(Chinese Taipei) J Wang	6	6
Q	(Australia) D Kelly	1	6^{5}
6	(United Kingdom) D Evans	6	7^{7}

Second round
1	(Lithuania) R Berankis	7	6
(Australia) B Mitchell	5	4
(Chinese Taipei) J Jung	2	3
5	(Ukraine) S Stakhovsky	6	6
(Russia) A Kudryavtsev	6^{4}	1
Q	(Australia) M Matosevic	7^{7}	6
(Chinese Taipei) J Wang	4	3
6	(United Kingdom) D Evans	6	6

Quarterfinals
1	(Lithuania) R Berankis	6	7
5	(Ukraine) S Stakhovsky	4	5
Q	(Australia) M Matosevic	3	5
6	(United Kingdom) D Evans	6	7

Semifinals
1	(Lithuania) R Berankis	3	6^{5}
6	(United Kingdom) D Evans	6	7^{7}

=== Bottom half ===
First round
8	(Russia) K Kravchuk	7^{8}	6
(Australia) M Barton	6^{6}	3
(Chinese Taipei) L-c Huang	2	2
(United States) D Nguyen	6	6
(Switzerland) M Chiudinelli	6	6
(China) D Wu	1	1
WC	(Chinese Taipei) C-y Yu	4	4
3	(Japan) T Ito	6	6
7	(Japan) G Soeda	6^{4}	5
(Israel) A Weintraub	7^{7}	7
Q	(Japan) Shuichi Sekiguchi	6^{6}	6^{6}
(Denmark) F Nielsen	7^{8}	7^{8}
WC	(Chinese Taipei) J-c Hung	4	0
(United Kingdom) L Broady	6	6
Q	(Japan) Yuya Kibi	1	7^{7}	6
2	(Australia) S Groth	6	6^{2}	4

Second round
8	(Russia) K Kravchuk	6	6^{2}	6
(United States) D Nguyen	3	7^{7}	4
(Switzerland) M Chiudinelli	2	3
3	(Japan) T Ito	6	6
(Israel) A Weintraub	6	3	7^{7}
(Denmark) F Nielsen	3	6	6^{2}
(United Kingdom) L Broady	6	6
Q	(Japan) Y Kibi	2	4

Quarterfinals
8	(Russia) K Kravchuk	3	6	6
3	(Japan) T Ito	6	1	2
(Israel) A Weintraub	5	3
(United Kingdom) L Broady	7	6

Semifinals
8	(Russia) K Kravchuk	6	6
(United Kingdom) L Broady	2	4
