= 2019 OEC Kaohsiung – Doubles =

Doubles
- 2019 OEC Kaohsiung

Final
- Champions: (Chinese Taipei) Hsieh Cheng-peng (Chinese Taipei) Yang Tsung-hua
- Runners-up: (United States) Evan King (United States) Hunter Reese
- Score: 6–4, 7–6^{(7–4)}

Events
Singles	Doubles
- OEC Kaohsiung

Hsieh Cheng-peng and Yang Tsung-hua were the defending tennis champions and successfully defended their title, defeating Evan King and Hunter Reese 6–4, 7–6^{(7–4)} in the final.

== Seeds ==
1. (Australia) Max Purcell / (Australia) Luke Saville (first round)
2. (China) Gong Maoxin / (Portugal) Gonçalo Oliveira (first round)
3. (Chinese Taipei) Hsieh Cheng-peng / (Chinese Taipei) Yang Tsung-hua (champions)
4. (United States) Evan King / (United States) Hunter Reese (final)

== Draw ==
Key

- Q = Qualifier
- WC = Wild card
- LL = Lucky loser
- Alt = Alternate
- ITF = ITF entry
- PR = Protected ranking
- SR = Special ranking
- SE = Special exempt
- JE = Junior exempt
- JR = Junior Accelerator Programme entrant
- CO = College Accelerator Programme entrant
- NG = Next Gen Accelerator Program entrant
- w/o = Walkover
- r = Retired
- d = Defaulted

First round
1	(Australia) M Purcell (Australia) L Saville	1	6	[7]
WC	(Chinese Taipei) R Ho (Chinese Taipei) K-y Lee	6	3	[10]
(Australia) J Millman (Australia) S Puodziunas	7^{9}	4	[8]
(Japan) T Matsui (Japan) Yo Watanuki	6^{7}	6	[10]
4	(United States) E King (United States) H Reese	6	6
(Canada) S Diez (Australia) M Polmans	2	3
WC	(Chinese Taipei) C-h Tseng (Chinese Taipei) T-l Wu	6	7^{8}
(India) S Balaji (India) V Vardhan	4	6^{6}
Alt	(Australia) A Bolt (Australia) Jacob Grills	6	4	[8]
(India) S Myneni (India) J Nedunchezhiyan	4	6	[10]
(Portugal) F Ferreira Silva (Russia) T Gabashvili	1	1
3	(Chinese Taipei) C-p Hsieh (Chinese Taipei) T-h Yang	6	6
WC	(Chinese Taipei) Y-h Hsu (Chinese Taipei) J Wang	6	6
(United States) JP Fruttero (Spain) E López Pérez	4	3
(South Korea) J-s Nam (South Korea) M-k Song	6	6
2	(China) M Gong (Portugal) G Oliveira	3	2

Quarterfinals
WC	(Chinese Taipei) R Ho (Chinese Taipei) K-y Lee	6	6^{2}	[10]
(Japan) T Matsui (Japan) Yo Watanuki	4	7^{7}	[4]
4	(United States) E King (United States) H Reese	3	7^{7}	[10]
WC	(Chinese Taipei) C-h Tseng (Chinese Taipei) T-l Wu	6	6^{4}	[5]
(India) S Myneni (India) J Nedunchezhiyan	2	2
3	(Chinese Taipei) C-p Hsieh (Chinese Taipei) T-h Yang	6	6
WC	(Chinese Taipei) Y-h Hsu (Chinese Taipei) J Wang	2	6	[7]
(South Korea) J-s Nam (South Korea) M-k Song	6	3	[10]

Semifinals
WC	(Chinese Taipei) R Ho (Chinese Taipei) K-y Lee	6	1	[6]
4	(United States) E King (United States) H Reese	4	6	[10]
3	(Chinese Taipei) C-p Hsieh (Chinese Taipei) T-h Yang	6^{3}	6	[10]
(South Korea) J-s Nam (South Korea) M-k Song	7^{7}	4	[6]

Final
4	(United States) E King (United States) H Reese	4	6^{4}
3	(Chinese Taipei) C-p Hsieh (Chinese Taipei) T-h Yang	6	7^{7}
