= 2026 Santaizi ATP Challenger – Doubles =

Doubles
- 2026 Santaizi ATP Challenger

Final
- Champions: (New Zealand) Finn Reynolds (New Zealand) James Watt
- Runners-up: (India) Anirudh Chandrasekar (New Zealand) Ajeet Rai
- Score: 6–3, 6–2

Events
Singles	Doubles
- Santaizi ATP Challenger

Nathaniel Lammons and Jean-Julien Rojer were the defending champions but only Lammons chose to defend his title, partnering Jackson Withrow. They lost in the quarterfinals to Anirudh Chandrasekar and Ajeet Rai.

Finn Reynolds and James Watt won the title after defeating Chandrasekar and Rai 6–3, 6–2 in the final.

== Seeds ==
1. (United States) Nathaniel Lammons / (United States) Jackson Withrow (quarterfinals)
2. (New Zealand) Finn Reynolds / (New Zealand) James Watt (champions)
3. (Netherlands) Thijmen Loof / (Japan) Kaito Uesugi (semifinals)
4. (Bulgaria) Alexander Donski / (Czech Republic) David Poljak (semifinals)

== Draw ==
Key

- Q = Qualifier
- WC = Wild card
- LL = Lucky loser
- Alt = Alternate
- ITF = ITF entry
- PR = Protected ranking
- SR = Special ranking
- SE = Special exempt
- JE = Junior exempt
- JR = Junior Accelerator Programme entrant
- CO = College Accelerator Programme entrant
- NG = Next Gen Accelerator Program entrant
- w/o = Walkover
- r = Retired
- d = Defaulted

First round
1	(United States) N Lammons (United States) J Withrow	6^{7}	7^{7}	[11]
(India) S Banthia (India) A Kadhe	7^{9}	6^{5}	[9]
(Australia) B Bayldon (Australia) T Fancutt	6^{6}	7	[5]
(India) A Chandrasekar (New Zealand) A Rai	7^{8}	5	[10]
4	(Bulgaria) A Donski (Czech Republic) D Poljak	6	7^{7}
PR	(Japan) T Matsui (India) R Ramanathan	3	6^{4}
Alt	(United Kingdom) F Bass (United Kingdom) S Duncan	6	4	[7]
(Chinese Taipei) R Ho (Croatia) M Poljičak	3	6	[10]
WC	(Chinese Taipei) C-p Hsieh (Chinese Taipei) Y-h Hsu	4	6	[10]
WC	(Chinese Taipei) J Hsu (Chinese Taipei) T-h Huang	6	4	[7]
(Israel) D Cukierman (Brazil) F Romboli	4	6^{3}
3	(Netherlands) T Loof (Japan) K Uesugi	6	7^{7}
(Australia) Ja Delaney (Australia) Je Delaney	4	4
(Romania) A Jecan (Poland) S Kielan	6	6
(Australia) J Kubler (Australia) C Puttergill	4	4
2	(New Zealand) F Reynolds (New Zealand) J Watt	6	6

Quarterfinals
1	(United States) N Lammons (United States) J Withrow	6	6^{8}	[8]
(India) A Chandrasekar (New Zealand) A Rai	4	7^{10}	[10]
4	(Bulgaria) A Donski (Czech Republic) D Poljak	1	6	[11]
(Chinese Taipei) R Ho (Croatia) M Poljičak	6	3	[9]
WC	(Chinese Taipei) C-p Hsieh (Chinese Taipei) Y-h Hsu	3	6	[6]
3	(Netherlands) T Loof (Japan) K Uesugi	6	1	[10]
(Romania) A Jecan (Poland) S Kielan	1	4
2	(New Zealand) F Reynolds (New Zealand) J Watt	6	6

Semifinals
(India) A Chandrasekar (New Zealand) A Rai	7	7
4	(Bulgaria) A Donski (Czech Republic) D Poljak	5	5
3	(Netherlands) T Loof (Japan) K Uesugi	4	6^{6}
2	(New Zealand) F Reynolds (New Zealand) J Watt	6	7^{8}

Final
(India) A Chandrasekar (New Zealand) A Rai	3	2
2	(New Zealand) F Reynolds (New Zealand) J Watt	6	6
