= 2018 Santaizi ATP Challenger =

- Date: 9–15 April
- Edition: 5th
- Draw: 32S / 16D
- Surface: Carpet (indoors)
- Location: Taipei, Taiwan

Champions

Singles
- (India) Yuki Bhambri

Doubles
- (Australia) Matthew Ebden / (Australia) Andrew Whittington
← 2017 ·	Santaizi ATP Challenger	· 2019 →

The 2018 Santaizi ATP Challenger was a professional tennis tournament played on indoor carpet courts. It was the fifth edition of the tournament which was part of the 2018 ATP Challenger Tour. It took place in Taipei, Taiwan between 9 and 15 April.

== Singles main-draw entrants ==
=== Seeds ===
Country	Player	Rank^{1}	Seed
AUS	Matthew Ebden	77	1
RUS	Evgeny Donskoy	85	2
ISR	Dudi Sela	98	3
IND	Yuki Bhambri	105	4
FRA	Quentin Halys	115	5
IND	Ramkumar Ramanathan	132	6
JPN	Go Soeda	153	7
JPN	Tatsuma Ito	155	8

- ^{1} Rankings are as of 2 April 2018.

=== Other entrants ===
The following players received wildcards into the singles main draw:

- (Chinese Taipei) Chen Ti
- (Chinese Taipei) Hsu Yu-hsiou
- (Chinese Taipei) Tseng Chun-hsin
- (Chinese Taipei) Wu Tung-lin

The following players received entry into the singles main draw using protected rankings:

- (India) Saketh Myneni

The following players received entry from the qualifying draw:

- (Australia) Thomas Fancutt
- (Chinese Taipei) Lo Chien-hsun
- (South Africa) Ruan Roelofse
- (Japan) Shuichi Sekiguchi

The following players received entry as lucky losers:

- (Australia) Jacob Grills
- (India) Sasikumar Mukund

== Champions ==
=== Singles ===
- (India) Yuki Bhambri def. (India) Ramkumar Ramanathan 6–3, 6–4.

=== Doubles ===
- (Australia) Matthew Ebden / (Australia) Andrew Whittington def. (India) Prajnesh Gunneswaran / (India) Saketh Myneni 6–4, 5–7, [10–6].
