= 2018 Santaizi ATP Challenger – Singles =

Singles
- 2018 Santaizi ATP Challenger

Final
- Champion: (India) Yuki Bhambri
- Runner-up: (India) Ramkumar Ramanathan
- Score: 6–3, 6–4

Events
Singles	Doubles
- Santaizi ATP Challenger

Lu Yen-hsun was the defending champion but chose not to defend his title.

Yuki Bhambri won the title after defeating Ramkumar Ramanathan 6–3, 6–4 in the final.

== Seeds ==
1. (Australia) Matthew Ebden (second round)
2. (Russia) Evgeny Donskoy (quarterfinals)
3. (Israel) Dudi Sela (quarterfinals)
4. (India) Yuki Bhambri (champion)
5. (France) Quentin Halys (first round)
6. (India) Ramkumar Ramanathan (final)
7. (Japan) Go Soeda (semifinals)
8. (Japan) Tatsuma Ito (semifinals)

== Draw ==
Key

- Q = Qualifier
- WC = Wild card
- LL = Lucky loser
- Alt = Alternate
- ITF = ITF entry
- PR = Protected ranking
- SR = Special ranking
- SE = Special exempt
- JE = Junior exempt
- JR = Junior Accelerator Programme entrant
- CO = College Accelerator Programme entrant
- NG = Next Gen Accelerator Program entrant
- w/o = Walkover
- r = Retired
- d = Defaulted

=== Finals ===
Semifinals
8	(Japan) Tatsuma Ito	6	3	4
4	(India) Yuki Bhambri	3	6	6
6	(India) Ramkumar Ramanathan	7^{11}	6
7	(Japan) Go Soeda	6^{9}	4

Final
4	(India) Yuki Bhambri	6	6
6	(India) Ramkumar Ramanathan	3	4

=== Top half ===
First round
1	(Australia) M Ebden	6	6
(Chinese Taipei) T-h Yang	3	4
(Chinese Taipei) J Jung	6	6
LL	(Australia) Jacob Grills	0	3
(Australia) A Bolt	6^{5}	6	3
(South Korea) S-w Kwon	7^{7}	4	6
(Lithuania) L Grigelis	7^{7}	4	3
8	(Japan) T Ito	6^{5}	6	6
4	(India) Y Bhambri	6^{5}	6	6
(Spain) R Ortega Olmedo	7^{7}	3	3
(Poland) K Majchrzak	6	2	6^{5}
(Germany) M Bachinger	4	6	7^{7}
WC	(Chinese Taipei) C-h Tseng	6^{4}	1
(Japan) Y Takahashi	7^{7}	6
Q	(Chinese Taipei) Lo Chien-hsun	6	1	6
5	(France) Q Halys	3	6	3

Second round
1	(Australia) M Ebden	2	6^{4}
(Chinese Taipei) J Jung	6	7^{7}
(South Korea) S-w Kwon	6	6^{4}	4
8	(Japan) T Ito	4	7^{7}	6
4	(India) Y Bhambri	6	6
(Germany) M Bachinger	4	4
(Japan) Y Takahashi	3	7^{7}	3
Q	(Chinese Taipei) C-h Lo	6	6^{5}	6

Quarterfinals
(Chinese Taipei) J Jung	6	6^{9}	6^{4}
8	(Japan) T Ito	3	7^{11}	7^{7}
4	(India) Y Bhambri	6	6
Q	(Chinese Taipei) C-h Lo	4	2

Semifinals
8	(Japan) T Ito	6	3	4
4	(India) Y Bhambri	3	6	6

=== Bottom half ===
First round
6	(India) R Ramanathan	7^{7}	6^{0}	6
Q	(Australia) T Fancutt	6^{5}	7^{7}	2
(South Africa) L Harris	6	7^{7}
LL	(India) S Mukund	4	6^{3}
WC	(Chinese Taipei) T-l Wu	6	7^{7}
(Australia) A Whittington	3	6^{1}
Q	(Japan) Shuichi Sekiguchi	4	2
3	(Israel) D Sela	6	6
7	(Japan) G Soeda	7^{7}	6
(Australia) D Kelly	6^{4}	4
WC	(Chinese Taipei) T Chen	7^{10}	6
Q	(South Africa) R Roelofse	6^{8}	3
PR	(India) S Myneni	4	7^{7}	6
(India) P Gunneswaran	6	6^{2}	4
WC	(Chinese Taipei) Y-h Hsu	1	1
2	(Russia) E Donskoy	6	6

Second round
6	(India) R Ramanathan	7^{7}	6^{3}	7^{7}
(South Africa) L Harris	6^{3}	7^{7}	6^{5}
WC	(Chinese Taipei) T-l Wu	3	6	3
3	(Israel) D Sela	6	1	6
7	(Japan) G Soeda	6	6
WC	(Chinese Taipei) T Chen	3	1
PR	(India) S Myneni	2	4
2	(Russia) E Donskoy	6	6

Quarterfinals
6	(India) R Ramanathan	6	6
3	(Israel) D Sela	4	2
7	(Japan) G Soeda	7^{7}	6
2	(Russia) E Donskoy	6^{4}	4

Semifinals
6	(India) R Ramanathan	7^{11}	6
7	(Japan) G Soeda	6^{9}	4
