= 2016 Santaizi ATP Challenger =

- Date: 25 April – 1 May
- Edition: 3rd
- Draw: 32S / 16D
- Prize money: $75,000+H
- Surface: Carpet (indoors)
- Location: Taipei, Taiwan

Champions

Singles
- (United Kingdom) Daniel Evans

Doubles
- (Chinese Taipei) Hsieh Cheng-peng / (Chinese Taipei) Yang Tsung-hua
- Santaizi ATP Challenger

The 2016 Santaizi ATP Challenger was a professional tennis tournament played on indoor carpet courts. It was the third edition of the tournament which was part of the 2016 ATP Challenger Tour. It took place in Taipei, Taiwan between 25 April and 1 May.

== Singles main-draw entrants ==
=== Seeds ===
Country	Player	Rank^{1}	Seed
LTU	Ričardas Berankis	62	1
AUS	Sam Groth	80	2
JPN	Tatsuma Ito	103	3
JPN	Yūichi Sugita	111	4
UKR	Sergiy Stakhovsky	122	5
GBR	Daniel Evans	124	6
JPN	Go Soeda	128	7
RUS	Konstantin Kravchuk	129	8

- ^{1} Rankings are as of April 18, 2016

=== Other entrants ===
The following players received wildcards into the singles main draw:

- (Chinese Taipei) Yi Chu-huan
- (Chinese Taipei) Hung Jui-chen
- (Chinese Taipei) Yu Cheng-yu
- (Chinese Taipei) Wu Tung-lin

The following players received entry from the qualifying draw:

- (Australia) Marinko Matosevic
- (Australia) Dayne Kelly
- (Japan) Shuichi Sekiguchi
- (Japan) Yuya Kibi

== Champions ==
=== Singles ===
- (United Kingdom) Daniel Evans def. (Russia) Konstantin Kravchuk, 3–6, 6–4, 6–4

=== Doubles ===
- (Chinese Taipei) Hsieh Cheng-peng / (Chinese Taipei) Yang Tsung-hua def. (Denmark) Frederik Nielsen / (Republic of Ireland) David O'Hare, 7–6^{(8–6)}, 6–4
