= 2025 Santaizi ATP Challenger – Doubles =

Doubles
- 2025 Santaizi ATP Challenger

Final
- Champions: (United States) Nathaniel Lammons (Netherlands) Jean-Julien Rojer
- Runners-up: (Japan) Kaito Uesugi (Japan) Seita Watanabe
- Score: 7–6^{(7–4)}, 7–6^{(8–6)}

Events
Singles	Doubles
- Santaizi ATP Challenger

Ray Ho and Nam Ji-sung were the defending champions but only Nam chose to defend his title, partnering Takeru Yuzuki. They lost in the first round to Pruchya Isaro and Niki Kaliyanda Poonacha.

Nathaniel Lammons and Jean-Julien Rojer won the title after defeating Kaito Uesugi and Seita Watanabe 7–6^{(7–4)}, 7–6^{(8–6)} in the final.

== Seeds ==
1. (Austria) Neil Oberleitner / (Czech Republic) Michael Vrbenský (first round)
2. (South Korea) Nam Ji-sung / (Japan) Takeru Yuzuki (first round)
3. (United States) Nathaniel Lammons / (Netherlands) Jean-Julien Rojer (champions)
4. (Japan) Kaito Uesugi / (Japan) Seita Watanabe (final)

== Draw ==
Key

- Q = Qualifier
- WC = Wild card
- LL = Lucky loser
- Alt = Alternate
- ITF = ITF entry
- PR = Protected ranking
- SR = Special ranking
- SE = Special exempt
- JE = Junior exempt
- JR = Junior Accelerator Programme entrant
- CO = College Accelerator Programme entrant
- NG = Next Gen Accelerator Program entrant
- w/o = Walkover
- r = Retired
- d = Defaulted

First round
1	(Austria) N Oberleitner (Czech Republic) M Vrbenský	2	3
(Chinese Taipei) Y-h Hsu (Chinese Taipei) T-h Huang	6	6
(South Korea) U-s Park (Japan) K Uchida	3	5
(Estonia) K Tamm (France) A Weber	6	7
3	(United States) N Lammons (Netherlands) J-J Rojer	6	6
(Japan) T Ichikawa (Kazakhstan) G Lomakin	4	4
(Japan) S Hazawa (Japan) Leo Vithoontien	6^{1}	6^{5}
(Japan) M Imamura (Japan) Y Shimizu	7^{7}	7^{7}
(Philippines) FC Alcantara (Switzerland) L Castelnuovo	6	6
(Czech Republic) M Gengel (India) M Sasikumar	4	2
(India) SDP Dev (India) Nitin Kumar Sinha	4	6^{4}
4	(Japan) K Uesugi (Japan) S Watanabe	6	7^{7}
WC	(Chinese Taipei) C-p Hsieh (Japan) A Santillan	6	6
WC	(Chinese Taipei) J Hsu (Chinese Taipei) J Jung	0	2
(Thailand) P Isaro (India) N Kaliyanda Poonacha	4	7^{8}	[14]
2	(South Korea) J-s Nam (Japan) T Yuzuki	6	6^{6}	[12]

Quarterfinals
(Chinese Taipei) Y-h Hsu (Chinese Taipei) T-h Huang	7^{8}	3	[8]
(Estonia) K Tamm (France) A Weber	6^{6}	6	[10]
3	(United States) N Lammons (Netherlands) J-J Rojer	6	6
(Japan) M Imamura (Japan) Y Shimizu	2	4
(Philippines) FC Alcantara (Switzerland) L Castelnuovo	3	3
4	(Japan) K Uesugi (Japan) S Watanabe	6	6
WC	(Chinese Taipei) C-p Hsieh (Japan) A Santillan	6	6^{4}	[10]
(Thailand) P Isaro (India) N Kaliyanda Poonacha	4	7^{7}	[8]

Semifinals
(Estonia) K Tamm (France) A Weber	3	2
3	(United States) N Lammons (Netherlands) J-J Rojer	6	6
4	(Japan) K Uesugi (Japan) S Watanabe	7^{7}	6
WC	(Chinese Taipei) C-p Hsieh (Japan) A Santillan	6^{2}	4

Final
3	(United States) N Lammons (Netherlands) J-J Rojer	7^{7}	7^{8}
4	(Japan) K Uesugi (Japan) S Watanabe	6^{4}	6^{6}
