= 2019 Santaizi ATP Challenger – Doubles =

Doubles
- 2019 Santaizi ATP Challenger

Final
- Champions: (India) Sriram Balaji (Israel) Jonathan Erlich
- Runners-up: (Netherlands) Sander Arends (Austria) Tristan-Samuel Weissborn
- Score: 6–3, 6–2

Events
Singles	Doubles
- Santaizi ATP Challenger

Matthew Ebden and Andrew Whittington were the defending champions but chose not to defend their title.

Sriram Balaji and Jonathan Erlich won the title after defeating Sander Arends and Tristan-Samuel Weissborn 6–3, 6–2 in the final.

== Seeds ==
1. (Chinese Taipei) Hsieh Cheng-peng / (Indonesia) Christopher Rungkat (semifinals)
2. (Australia) Max Purcell / (Australia) Luke Saville (first round)
3. (India) Sriram Balaji / (Israel) Jonathan Erlich (champions)
4. (Netherlands) Sander Arends / (Austria) Tristan-Samuel Weissborn (final)

== Draw ==
Key

- Q = Qualifier
- WC = Wild card
- LL = Lucky loser
- Alt = Alternate
- ITF = ITF entry
- PR = Protected ranking
- SR = Special ranking
- SE = Special exempt
- JE = Junior exempt
- JR = Junior Accelerator Programme entrant
- CO = College Accelerator Programme entrant
- NG = Next Gen Accelerator Program entrant
- w/o = Walkover
- r = Retired
- d = Defaulted

First round
1	(Chinese Taipei) C-p Hsieh (Indonesia) C Rungkat	6^{4}	6	[11]
(Philippines) R Gonzales (Thailand) So Ratiwatana	7^{7}	1	[9]
WC	(Chinese Taipei) Y-h Hsu (Chinese Taipei) T-l Wu	7	6^{5}	[8]
WC	(Chinese Taipei) J Jung (Chinese Taipei) J Wang	5	7^{7}	[10]
3	(India) S Balaji (Israel) J Erlich	6	3	[11]
(Switzerland) L Margaroli (India) V Vardhan	4	6	[9]
(South Korea) S-w Kwon (Chinese Taipei) T-h Yang	6^{5}	3
(India) S Myneni (India) R Ramanathan	7^{7}	6
(France) M Janvier (France) S Robert	6	6^{4}	[10]
(Netherlands) D Pel (Chile) H Podlipnik Castillo	1	7^{7}	[6]
(Austria) D Novak (Ukraine) S Stakhovsky	6	4	[4]
4	(Netherlands) S Arends (Austria) T-S Weissborn	3	6	[10]
WC	(Chinese Taipei) T Chen (Chinese Taipei) R Ho	3	7^{7}	[3]
(Portugal) G Oliveira (Japan) Y Uchiyama	6	6^{3}	[10]
(Japan) T Matsui (Japan) H Moriya	6	3	[10]
2	(Australia) M Purcell (Australia) L Saville	4	6	[7]

Quarterfinals
1	(Chinese Taipei) C-p Hsieh (Indonesia) C Rungkat	6	7^{10}
WC	(Chinese Taipei) J Jung (Chinese Taipei) J Wang	4	6^{8}
3	(India) S Balaji (Israel) J Erlich	6	6
(India) S Myneni (India) R Ramanathan	4	3
(France) M Janvier (France) S Robert	6^{4}	6	[8]
4	(Netherlands) S Arends (Austria) T-S Weissborn	7^{7}	4	[10]
(Portugal) G Oliveira (Japan) Y Uchiyama	6	6
(Japan) T Matsui (Japan) H Moriya	4	4

Semifinals
1	(Chinese Taipei) C-p Hsieh (Indonesia) C Rungkat	2	3
3	(India) S Balaji (Israel) J Erlich	6	6
4	(Netherlands) S Arends (Austria) T-S Weissborn	2	6	[11]
(Portugal) G Oliveira (Japan) Y Uchiyama	6	3	[9]

Final
3	(India) S Balaji (Israel) J Erlich	6	6
4	(Netherlands) S Arends (Austria) T-S Weissborn	3	2
