= 2026 Santaizi ATP Challenger =

- Date: 2–8 November
- Edition: 9th
- Surface: Hard
- Location: Taipei, Taiwan

Champions

Singles
- (Japan) Yosuke Watanuki

Doubles
- (New Zealand) Finn Reynolds / (New Zealand) James Watt
- Santaizi ATP Challenger

The 2026 Santaizi ATP Challenger was a professional tennis tournament played on hard courts. It was the ninth edition of the tournament which was part of the 2026 ATP Challenger Tour. It took place in Taipei, Taiwan between 2 and 8 November 2026.

== Singles main-draw entrants ==
=== Seeds ===
Country	Player	Rank^{1}	Seed
HKG	Coleman Wong	87	1
JPN	Sho Shimabukuro	106	2
RSA	Lloyd Harris	108	3
~~AUS~~	~~Aleksandar Vukic~~	~~116~~	~~4~~
~~JPN~~	~~Rei Sakamoto~~	~~125~~	~~5~~
FRA	Alexandre Müller	130	6
GRE	Stefanos Sakellaridis	132	7
AUT	Joel Schwärzler	172	8

- ^{1} Rankings are as of 26 October 2026.

=== Other entrants ===
The following players received wildcards into the singles main draw:

- (Chinese Taipei) Chen Kuan-shou
- (Chinese Taipei) Huang Tsung-hao
- (Chinese Taipei) Wu Tung-lin

The following player received entry into the singles main draw as a special exempt:

- Yaroslav Demin

The following player received entry into the singles main draw as an alternate:

- (Chinese Taipei) Hsu Yu-hsiou

The following players received entry from the qualifying draw:

- (Australia) Jake Delaney
- (Chinese Taipei) Hou Chun-chien
- (Japan) Masamichi Imamura
- (Australia) Omar Jasika
- (Japan) Yuta Shimizu
- (Japan) Yosuke Watanuki

The following players received entry as lucky losers:

- (Turkey) ~~Yankı Erel~~
- (Malaysia) Mitsuki Wei Kang Leong
- (Thailand) Kasidit Samrej

== Champions ==
=== Singles ===
- (Japan) Yosuke Watanuki def. (Czech Republic) Jan Kumstát 7–6^{(7–2)}, 7–5.

=== Doubles ===
- (New Zealand) Finn Reynolds / (New Zealand) James Watt def. (India) Anirudh Chandrasekar / (New Zealand) Ajeet Rai 6–3, 6–2.
