= 2024 Santaizi ATP Challenger =

- Date: 13–18 May
- Edition: 7th
- Surface: Hard
- Location: Taipei, Taiwan

Champions

Singles
- (Australia) Adam Walton

Doubles
- (Chinese Taipei) Ray Ho / (South Korea) Nam Ji-sung
- Santaizi ATP Challenger

The 2024 Santaizi ATP Challenger was a professional tennis tournament played on hard courts. It was the seventh edition of the tournament which was part of the 2024 ATP Challenger Tour. It took place in Taipei, Taiwan between 13 and 18 May.

== Singles main-draw entrants ==
=== Seeds ===
Country	Player	Rank^{1}	Seed
AUS	Max Purcell	84	1
AUS	James Duckworth	102	2
AUS	Adam Walton	111	3
JPN	Yasutaka Uchiyama	189	4
AUS	Li Tu	194	5
KOR	Hong Seong-chan	198	6
AUS	Omar Jasika	204	7
FRA	Antoine Escoffier	228	8

- ^{1} Rankings are as of 6 May 2024.

=== Other entrants ===
The following players received wildcards into the singles main draw:

- (Chinese Taipei) Ray Ho
- (Chinese Taipei) Huang Tsung-hao
- (Chinese Taipei) Yin Bang-shuo

The following players received entry into the singles main draw as alternates:

- (South Korea) Chung Yun-seong
- (Australia) James McCabe

The following players received entry from the qualifying draw:

- (United States) Alafia Ayeni
- (Switzerland) Rémy Bertola
- (Australia) Blake Ellis
- (South Korea) Nam Ji-sung
- (India) Mukund Sasikumar
- (Japan) James Trotter

== Champions ==
=== Singles ===
- (Australia) Adam Walton def. (Ukraine) Illya Marchenko 3–6, 6–2, 7–6^{(7–3)}.

=== Doubles ===
- (Chinese Taipei) Ray Ho / (South Korea) Nam Ji-sung def. (Japan) Toshihide Matsui / (Japan) Kaito Uesugi 6–2, 6–2.
