= Dennis Novak =

Austrian tennis player

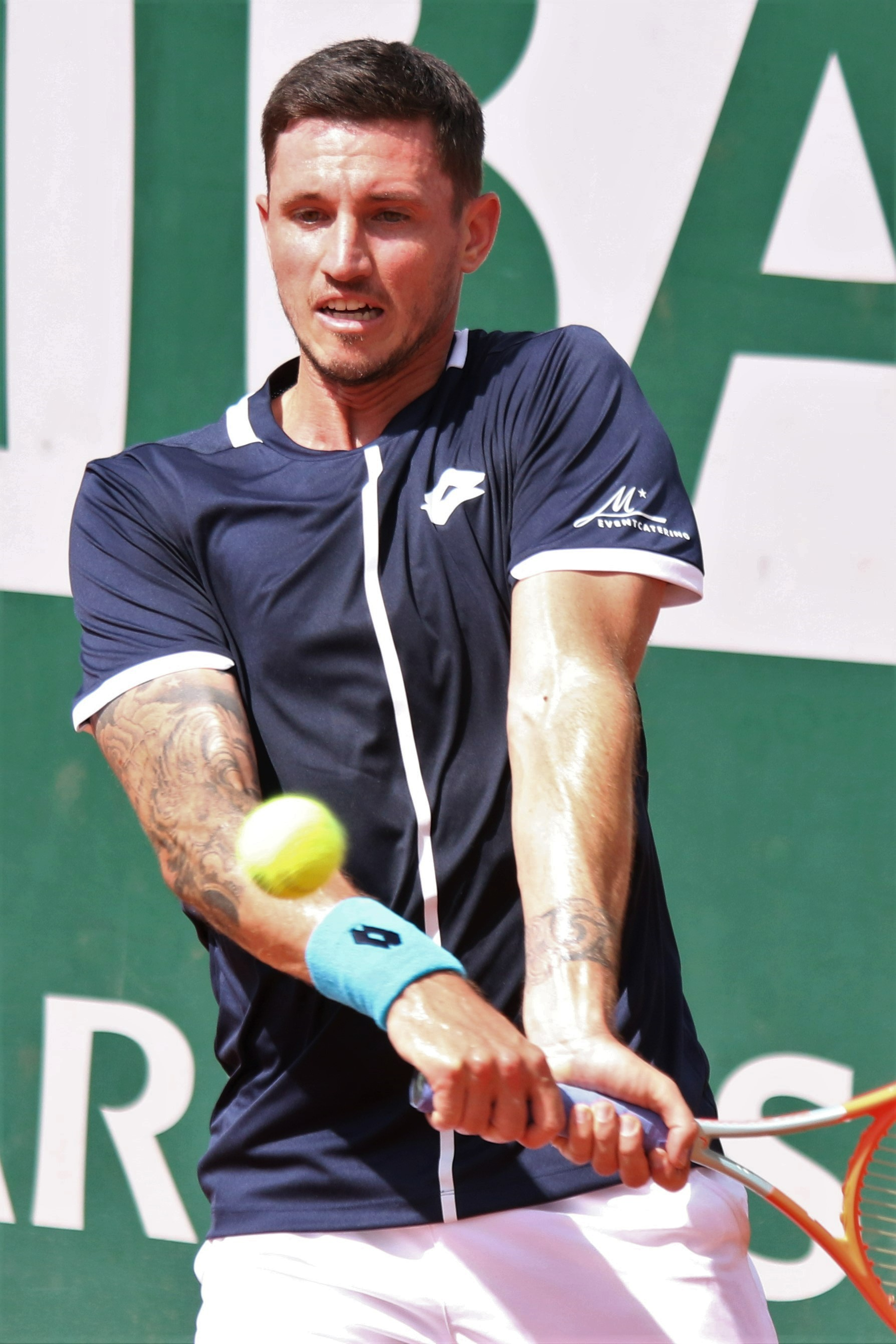
- Novak at the 2022 French Open
- Full name: Dennis Novak
- Country (sports): Austria
- Residence: Pottendorf, Austria
- Born: 28 August 1993 (age 32) Wiener Neustadt, Austria
- Height: 1.83 m (6 ft 0 in)
- Turned pro: 2011
- Retired: 2025
- Plays: Right-handed (two-handed backhand)
- Coach: Günter Bresnik (2021– 2025)
- Prize money: US$ 1,961,772

Singles
- Career record: 26–54
- Career titles: 0
- Highest ranking: No. 85 (2 March 2020)

Grand Slam singles results
- Australian Open: 1R (2018, 2020, 2021)
- French Open: 1R (2020)
- Wimbledon: 3R (2018)
- US Open: 1R (2018, 2020)

Doubles
- Career record: 5–8
- Career titles: 0
- Highest ranking: No. 283 (12 June 2017)

Grand Slam doubles results
- French Open: 2R (2020)
- Last updated on: 1 December 2025.

Dennis Novak (German pronunciation: [ˈdɛnɪs ˈnoːvak]; born 28 August 1993) is an Austrian former professional tennis player. Novak achieved a career-high ATP singles ranking of world No. 85 in March 2020.

== Professional career ==
=== 2013: ATP debut ===
Novak made his ATP main draw debut at the 2013 Bet-at-home Cup Kitzbühel where he defeated Matthias Haim, Lorenzo Giustino and Tihomir Grozdanov in the qualifying rounds. In the main draw, Novak lost to compatriot Andreas Haider-Maurer.

=== 2018-2020: Major debut & third round, Challenger titles, top 100 ===
In 2018, Novak reached the third round of a major for the first time at the 2018 Wimbledon Championships, but lost to Milos Raonic.

In April 2019, he won his first ATP Challenger Tour title in Taipei. In November, he won his second at the 2019 Slovak Open.

He made his debut in the top 100 on 13 January 2020 at world No. 99 and reached a career high ranking of No. 85 on 2 March 2020.

=== 2022-2025: Austrian No. 1, retirement ===
He reached the second round at the 2022 Wimbledon Championships for a second time with a win over Facundo Bagnis. He became Austrian No. 1 on 15 August 2022 ranked at No. 133.

He qualified for the 2023 Wimbledon Championships for a third consecutive year but lost again to Milos Raonic.

He fell out of the top 200 at world No. 213 on 15 January 2024 and finished the 2024 season ranked No. 352 on 2 December 2024.

Novak announced his retirement from professional tennis in November 2025.

== Performance timelines ==
Key
W	F	SF	QF	#R	RR	Q#	P#	DNQ	A	Z#	PO	G	S	B	NMS	NTI	P	NH

(W) winner; (F) finalist; (SF) semifinalist; (QF) quarterfinalist; (#R) rounds 4, 3, 2, 1; (RR) round-robin stage; (Q#) qualification round; (P#) preliminary round; (DNQ) did not qualify; (A) absent; (Z#) Davis/Fed Cup Zonal Group (with number indication) or (PO) play-off; (G) gold, (S) silver or (B) bronze Olympic/Paralympic medal; (NMS) not a Masters tournament; (NTI) not a Tier I tournament; (P) postponed; (NH) not held; (SR) strike rate (events won / competed); (W–L) win–loss record.
To avoid confusion and double counting, these charts are updated at the conclusion of a tournament or when the player's participation has ended.

=== Singles ===
Current through the 2022 Davis Cup.

Tournament	2012	2013	2014	2015	2016	2017	2018	2019	2020	2021	2022	2023	SR	W–L	Win %
Grand Slam tournaments
Australian Open	A	A	A	A	Q2	A	1R	Q1	1R	1R	A	A	0 / 3	0–3	0%
French Open	A	A	A	A	A	A	Q3	Q1	1R	Q1	Q1	Q2	0 / 1	0–1	0%
Wimbledon	A	A	A	A	Q3	A	3R	1R	NH	1R	2R	1R	0 / 5	3–5	38%
US Open	A	A	A	A	Q1	A	1R	A	1R	A	Q3	Q2	0 / 2	0–2	0%
Win–loss	0–0	0–0	0–0	0–0	0–0	0–0	2–3	0–1	0–3	0–2	1–1	0–1	0 / 11	3–11	21%
National representation
Davis Cup	A	A	A	A	Z1	A	PO	QR	RR				0 / 1	8–4	67%
Career statistics
Tournaments	0	1	0	2	1	1	5	6	10	11	3	2	Career total: 42		
Overall win–loss	0–0	0–1	0–0	1–2	1–3	1–1	6–5	4–7	6–12	5–14	2–5	0–4	26–54		33%
Year-end ranking	708	369	320	211	248	225	140	108	96	118	183	168			

=== Doubles ===
	2016	2017	2018	2019	2020	2021	SR	W–L
Grand Slam tournaments
Australian Open	A	A	A	A	A	A	0 / 0	0–0
French Open	A	A	A	A	2R	A	0 / 1	1–1
Wimbledon	A	A	A	A	A	A	0 / 0	0–0
US Open	A	A	A	A	A	A	0 / 0	0–0
Win–loss	0–0	0–0	0–0	0–0	1–1	0–0	0 / 1	1–1
Career statistics
Tournaments	2	0	2	0	4	0	8	
Titles / Finals	0 / 1	0 / 0	0 / 0	0 / 0	0 / 0	0 / 0	0 / 1	
Overall win–loss	3–2	0–0	1–1	0–0	1–4	0–1	5–8	
Year-end ranking	336	774	438	1198	448	731		

== ATP career finals ==
=== Doubles: 1 (1 runner-up) ===
Legend Grand Slam tournaments (0–0) ATP Tour Finals (0–0) ATP Tour Masters 1000 (0–0) ATP Tour 500 Series (0–0) ATP Tour 250 Series (0–1)	Finals by surface Hard (0–0) Clay (0–1) Grass (0–0)

Result	W–L	Date	Tournament	Tier	Surface	Partner	Opponents	Score
Loss	0–1	Jul 2016	Austrian Open Kitzbühel, Austria	250 Series	Clay	(Austria) Dominic Thiem	(Netherlands) Wesley Koolhof (Netherlands) Matwé Middelkoop	6–2, 3–6, [9–11]

== ATP Challenger and ITF Futures finals ==
=== Singles: 41 (26–15) ===
Legend ATP Challenger (3–6) ITF Futures (23–9)	Finals by surface Hard (12–4) Clay (14–10) Grass (0–1)

Result	W–L	Date	Tournament	Tier	Surface	Opponent	Score
Loss	0–1	Jun 2012	Slovenia F2, Maribor	Futures	Clay	(Romania) Petru-Alexandru Luncanu	3–6, 1–6
Win	1–1	Mar 2013	Israel F4, Netanya	Futures	Hard	(Germany) Stefan Seifert	6–2, 6–3
Loss	1–2	Jul 2013	Austria F4, Kramsach	Futures	Clay	(Slovenia) Janez Semrajc	5–7, 0–6
Win	2–2	Aug 2013	Austria F6, Wels	Futures	Clay	(United Kingdom) Oliver Golding	6–2, 6–7^{(2–7)}, 7–6^{(7–1)}
Loss	2–3	Aug 2013	Austria F7, Innsbruck	Futures	Clay	(France) Laurent Lokoli	6–7^{(1–7)}, 3–6
Loss	2–4	Oct 2013	Turkey F40, Antalya	Futures	Hard	(Croatia) Mate Pavić	4–6, 2–6
Win	3–4	Nov 2013	Greece F17, Heraklion	Futures	Hard	(Italy) Federico Gaio	6–4, 6–2
Win	4–4	Feb 2014	Egypt F5, Sharm El Sheikh	Futures	Clay	(Italy) Matteo Marrai	7–6^{(7–5)}, 6–1
Win	5–4	Feb 2014	Egypt F6, Sharm El Sheikh	Futures	Clay	(Spain) Marc Giner	6–4, 6–4
Loss	5–5	Mar 2014	Italy F6, Santa Margherita di Pula	Futures	Clay	(Italy) Marco Cecchinato	4–6, 2–6
Loss	5–6	Jun 2014	Egypt F21, Sharm El Sheikh	Futures	Clay	(Spain) Marc Giner	3–6, 1–6
Loss	5–7	Jul 2014	Germany F7, Kassel	Futures	Clay	(Germany) Peter Torebko	7–6^{(8–6)}, 4–6, 6–7^{(2–7)}
Win	6–7	Jul 2014	Austria F6, Wels	Futures	Clay	(Germany) Peter Heller	6–4, 1–6, 6–3
Win	7–7	Aug 2014	Austria F7, Innsbruck	Futures	Clay	(Austria) Bastian Trinker	6–3, 6–2
Win	8–7	Feb 2015	Egypt F4, Sharm El Sheikh	Futures	Hard	(Czech Republic) Jaroslav Pospíšil	2–6, 6–3, 7–6^{(8–6)}
Win	9–7	Feb 2015	Egypt F5, Sharm El Sheikh	Futures	Hard	(Czech Republic) Jaroslav Pospíšil	6–7^{(5–7)}, 6–3, 7–6^{(7–2)}
Win	10–7	Apr 2015	Turkey F13, Antalya	Futures	Hard	(Bosnia and Herzegovina) Tomislav Brkić	6–3, 6–3
Win	11–7	Apr 2015	Egypt F14, Sharm El Sheikh	Futures	Hard	(Austria) Martin Fischer	2–6, 6–1, 6–3
Win	12–7	Apr 2015	Egypt F15, Sharm El Sheikh	Futures	Hard	(Egypt) Mohamed Safwat	6–2, 7–6^{(7–4)}
Win	13–7	Sep 2015	Austria F10, St. Pölten	Futures	Clay	(Austria) Pascal Brunner	3–6, 6–3, 6–4
Win	14–7	Apr 2016	Tunisia F14, Hammamet	Futures	Clay	(Austria) Pascal Brunner	7–6^{(7–4)}, 6–3
Win	15–7	May 2016	Turkey F18, Antalya	Futures	Hard	(Germany) Marc Sieber	6–2, 6–2
Win	16–7	May 2016	Turkey F19, Antalya	Futures	Hard	(Turkey) Anıl Yüksel	6–1, 6–3
Loss	16–8	Nov 2016	Egypt F31, Sharm El Sheikh	Futures	Hard	(France) Benjamin Bonzi	6–4, 3–6, 1–6
Win	17–8	May 2017	Turkey F17, Antalya	Futures	Clay	(Peru) Juan Pablo Varillas	6–2, 6–2
Win	18–8	May 2017	Turkey F18, Antalya	Futures	Clay	(Germany) Marc Sieber	6–4, 6–4
Win	19–8	Aug 2017	Czech Republic F5, Pardubice	Futures	Clay	(Slovakia) Alex Molčan	7–6^{(7–3)}, 6–3
Win	20–8	Aug 2017	Austria F5, Vogau	Futures	Clay	(Argentina) Franco Agamenone	6–3, 6–2
Win	21–8	Aug 2017	Austria F6, Innsbruck	Futures	Clay	(Brazil) Bruno Sant'Anna	6–3, 6–2
Win	22–8	Aug 2017	Serbia F3, Subotica	Futures	Clay	(Italy) Gian Marco Moroni	6–3, 6–7^{(4–7)}, 6–2
Win	23–8	Oct 2017	Turkey F36, Antalya	Futures	Clay	(Croatia) Mate Delić	6–3, 6–4
Loss	23–9	Mar 2018	Turkey F9, Antalya	Futures	Clay	(Peru) Juan Pablo Varillas	4–6, 4–6
Win	1–0	Apr 2019	Taipei, Taiwan	Challenger	Hard (i)	(Ukraine) Sergiy Stakhovsky	6–2, 6–4
Loss	1–1	Jun 2019	Ilkley, Great Britain	Challenger	Grass	(Germany) Dominik Köpfer	6–3, 3–6, 6–7^{(5–7)}
Win	2-1	Nov 2019	Bratislava, Slovakia	Challenger	Hard (i)	(Bosnia and Herzegovina) Damir Dzumhur	6–1, 6–1
Loss	2–2	Sep 2021	Orléans, France	Challenger	Hard (i)	(Switzerland) Henri Laaksonen	1–6, 6–2, 2–6
Loss	2–3	Aug 2022	Meerbusch, Germany	Challenger	Clay	(Spain) Bernabé Zapata Miralles	1–6, 2–6
Loss	2–4	Sep 2022	Szczecin, Poland	Challenger	Clay	(France) Corentin Moutet	2–6, 7–6^{(7–5)}, 4–6
Win	3–4	Jan 2023	Nonthaburi, Thailand	Challenger	Hard	(Chinese Taipei) Wu Tung-lin	6–4, 6–4
Loss	3–5	Sep 2023	Bad Waltersdorf, Austria	Challenger	Clay	(Italy) Andrea Pellegrino	6–1, 6–7^{(5–7)}, 3–6
Loss	3–6	Oct 2023	Hamburg, Germany	Challenger	Hard	(Ukraine) Illya Marchenko	2–6, 3–6

=== Doubles: 10 (4–6) ===
Legend ATP Challenger (0–0) ITF Futures (4–6)	Finals by surface Hard (0–2) Clay (4–4) Grass (0–0) Carpet (0–0)

Result	W–L	Date	Tournament	Tier	Surface	Partner	Opponents	Score
Loss	0–1	Jul 2012	Austria F2, Kramsach	Futures	Clay	(Moldova) Maxim Dubarenco	(Croatia) Mislav Hižak (Germany) Jeremy Jahn	3–6, 6–4, [4–10]
Win	1–1	Aug 2013	Austria F6, Wels	Futures	Clay	(Austria) Pascal Brunner	(Austria) Sebastian Ofner (Austria) Sebastian Stiefelmeyer	6–1, 6–1
Loss	1–2	Oct 2013	Turkey F40, Antalya	Futures	Hard	(Austria) Pascal Brunner	(Poland) Andriej Kapaś (Poland) Grzegorz Panfil	3–6, 6–2, [7–10]
Win	2–2	Jun 2014	Austria F1, Seefeld	Futures	Clay	(Austria) Pascal Brunner	(United States) Erik Elliott (Switzerland) Jacob Kahoun	6–3, 6–4
Win	3–2	Jul 2014	Austria F6, Wels	Futures	Clay	(Austria) Pascal Brunner	(Russia) Kirill Dmitriev (Kazakhstan) Dmitry Popko	6–4, 6–3
Loss	3–3	Oct 2014	Turkey F37, Antalya	Futures	Hard	(Russia) Kirill Dmitriev	(Slovenia) Janez Semrajc (Austria) Tristan-Samuel Weissborn	3–6, 7–5, [2–10]
Loss	3–4	Sep 2015	Austria F10, St. Pölten	Futures	Clay	(Austria) Pascal Brunner	(Austria) Lucas Miedler (Austria) Tristan-Samuel Weissborn	3–6, 3–6
Win	4–4	May 2017	Turkey F18, Antalya	Futures	Clay	(Austria) Thomas Statzberger	(United Kingdom) Joel Cannell (United Kingdom) Ryan James Storrie	6–0, 2–6, [14–12]
Loss	4–5	Jul 2017	Czech Republic F4, Ústí nad Orlicí	Futures	Clay	(Austria) Thomas Statzberger	(Czech Republic) Marek Gengel (Czech Republic) Matěj Vocel	7–6^{(7–3)}, 1–6, [14–16]
Loss	4–6	Aug 2017	Serbia F3, Subotica	Futures	Clay	(Austria) Thomas Statzberger	(Czech Republic) Vít Kopřiva (Czech Republic) Jaroslav Pospíšil	2–6, 6–3, [6–10]

== Record against top 10 players ==
Novak's match record against those who have been ranked in the Top 10, with those who have been No. 1 in boldface.

- (Poland) Hubert Hurkacz: 1–0
- (France) Lucas Pouille: 1–0
- (Russia) Andrey Rublev: 1–0
- (France) Gilles Simon: 1–0
- (Italy) Fabio Fognini: 1–1
- (South Africa) Kevin Anderson: 0–1
- (Croatia) Marin Čilić: 0–1
- (Bulgaria) Grigor Dimitrov: 0–1
- (Serbia) Novak Djokovic: 0–1
- (France) Richard Gasquet: 0–1
- (France) Gaël Monfils: 0–1
- (Canada) Milos Raonic: 0–1
- (Norway) Casper Ruud: 0–1
- (Italy) Jannik Sinner: 0–1
- (Czech Republic) Radek Štěpánek: 0–1
- (Germany) Alexander Zverev: 0–1
- (Russia) Karen Khachanov: 0–2

:* As of 26 November 2021
