= Hung Jui-chen =

Taiwanese tennis player

Hung Jui-chen 洪睿晨
- Country (sports): Chinese Taipei
- Born: 1 March 1990 (age 35) Nantou City, Taiwan
- Plays: Right-handed (two handed-backhand)
- Prize money: $49,582

Singles
- Career record: 4–5 (at ATP Tour level, Grand Slam level, and in Davis Cup)
- Career titles: 1 ITF
- Highest ranking: No. 596 (7 December 2015)

Doubles
- Career record: 0–2 (at ATP Tour level, Grand Slam level, and in Davis Cup)
- Career titles: 2 ITF
- Highest ranking: No. 402 (18 September 2017)

Team competitions
- Davis Cup: 4–7

Hung Jui-chen
- Traditional Chinese: 洪睿晨
- Simplified Chinese: 洪睿晨
Transcriptions
Standard Mandarin
- Hanyu Pinyin: Hóng Ruìchén

Hung Jui-chen (Chinese: 洪睿晨; born 1 March 1990) is a Taiwanese tennis player.

Hung has a career high ATP singles ranking of No. 596 achieved on 7 December 2015 and a career high ATP doubles ranking of No. 402 achieved on 18 September 2017. Hung has won 1 ITF singles title and 2 ITF doubles titles.

Hung has represented Chinese Taipei at the Davis Cup where he has a W/L record of 4–7.
