= Lee Kuan-yi =

Taiwanese tennis player

Lee Kuan-yi 李冠毅
- Country (sports): Chinese Taipei
- Born: 9 September 1996 (age 30) Taipei, Taiwan
- Height: 1.78 m (5 ft 10 in)
- Plays: Right-handed (two handed-backhand)
- Prize money: US $93,433

Singles
- Career record: 2–2 (at ATP Tour level, Grand Slam level, and in Davis Cup)
- Career titles: 2 ITF
- Highest ranking: No. 447 (30 January 2017)
- Current ranking: No. 583 (14 September 2026)

Doubles
- Career record: 0–0 (at ATP Tour level, Grand Slam level, and in Davis Cup)
- Career titles: 3 ITF
- Highest ranking: No. 523 (24 October 2016)
- Current ranking: No. 1,680 (14 September 2026)

Team competitions
- Davis Cup: 2–2
- Last updated on: 18 September 2026.

Lee Kuan-yi
- Traditional Chinese: 李冠毅
- Simplified Chinese: 李冠毅
Transcriptions
Standard Mandarin
- Hanyu Pinyin: Lǐ Guānyì

Lee Kuan-yi
Medal record

Men's Tennis

Representing Chinese Taipei

Summer Universiade
Gold medal – first place	2017 Taipei	Men's Team

Lee Kuan-yi (Chinese: 李冠毅; born 9 September 1996) is a Taiwanese tennis player. He has a career high ATP singles ranking of world of No. 447 achieved on 30 January 2017 and a career high ATP doubles ranking of No. 523 achieved on 24 October 2016. Lee has won 2 ITF singles title and 3 ITF doubles titles.

Lee has represented Chinese Taipei at the Davis Cup where he has a W/L record of 2–2.

== ATP Challenger and ITF Futures/World Tennis Tour finals ==
=== Singles: 8 (2–6) ===
Legend ATP Challenger Tour (0–0) ITF Futures/World Tennis Tour (2–6)	Finals by surface Hard (1–5) Clay (1–1) Grass (0–0) Carpet (0–0)

Result	W–L	Date	Tournament	Tier	Surface	Opponent	Score
Win	1–0	Jul 2016	China F12, Anning	Futures	Clay	(Austria) Bastian Trinker	7–5, 6–3
Loss	1–1	Oct 2016	Chinese Taipei F1, Kaohsiung	Futures	Hard	(Japan) Takuto Niki	4–6, 4–6
Win	2–1	Aug 2017	Thailand F4, Nonthaburi	Futures	Hard	(Japan) Sora Fukuda	6–3, 4–0, ret.
Loss	2–2	Aug 2017	Thailand F5, Nonthaburi	Futures	Hard	(Japan) Sho Katayama	6–7^{(7–9)}, 6–4, 3–6
Loss	2–3	Jan 2018	China F3, Anning	Futures	Clay	(Chinese Taipei) Yang Tsung-hua	4–6, 7–6^{(7–5)}, 1–6
Loss	2–4	Nov 2018	Thailand F9, Nonthaburi	Futures	Hard	(Russia) Konstantin Kravchuk	5–7, 2–6
Loss	2–5	Aug 2019	M15 Jakarta, Indonesia	World Tour	Hard	(Ukraine) Vladyslav Orlov	5–7, 6–4, 4–6
Loss	2–6	Jun 2023	M15 Tianjin, China	World Tour	Hard	(China) Li Zhe	3–6, ret.
