= Yu Cheng-yu =

Taiwanese tennis player

- Country (sports): Chinese Taipei
- Born: 2 April 1995 (age 30) Taipei, Taiwan
- Height: 1.88 m (6 ft 2 in)
- Plays: Right-handed (two-handed backhand)
- Prize money: $51,304

Singles
- Career record: 0–2 (at ATP Tour level, Grand Slam level, and in Davis Cup)
- Career titles: 0
- Highest ranking: No. 531 (14 August 2017)

Doubles
- Career record: 0–0 (at ATP Tour level, Grand Slam level, and in Davis Cup)
- Career titles: 0
- Highest ranking: No. 542 (10 December 2018)

Yu Cheng-yu (Chinese: 尤承宇; pinyin: Yóu Chéngyǔ; Taiwanese Mandarin: [jǒʊ tsʰə̌ŋ.ỳ]; born 2 April 1995) is a Taiwanese tennis player.

Yu has a career high ATP singles ranking of No. 531 achieved on 14 August 2017 and a career high ATP doubles ranking of No. 542 achieved on 10 December 2018.

Yu represents Chinese Taipei at the Davis Cup, where he has a W/L record of 0–1.
