= Santaizi ATP Challenger =

- 2025 Santaizi ATP Challenger

ATP Challenger Tour
- Location: Neihu District, Taipei City, Taiwan
- Venue: National Taiwan University Sports Center
- Category: ATP Challenger Tour (-2024), Challenger 100 (2025-)
- Surface: Hard (indoor)
- Draw: 32S/14Q/16D
- Prize money: $160,000 (2025), $82,000 (2024)

The Santaizi ATP Challenger is a tennis tournament held in Taipei City, Taiwan since 2014. The event is part of the ATP Challenger Tour and is played on indoor hardcourts. Following a four year hiatus, it returned in 2024 with a prize money of $82,000.

== Past finals ==
=== Singles ===
Year	Champion	Runner-up	Score
2026	(Japan) Yosuke Watanuki	(Czech Republic) Jan Kumstát	7–6^{(7–2)}, 7–5
2025	(Japan) Yoshihito Nishioka	(Australia) James Duckworth	7–5, 7–6^{(7–5)}
2024	(Australia) Adam Walton	(Ukraine) Illya Marchenko	3–6, 6–2, 7–6^{(7–3)}
2020–23	Not held		
2019	(Austria) Dennis Novak	(Ukraine) Sergiy Stakhovsky	6–2, 6–4
2018	(India) Yuki Bhambri	(India) Ramkumar Ramanathan	6–3, 6–4
2017	(Chinese Taipei) Lu Yen-hsun	(Japan) Tatsuma Ito	6–1, 7–6^{(7–4)}
2016	(United Kingdom) Daniel Evans	(Russia) Konstantin Kravchuk	3–6, 6–4, 6–4
2015	(Australia) Sam Groth	(Russia) Konstantin Kravchuk	6–7^{(5–7)}, 6–4, 7–6^{(7–3)}
2014	(Luxembourg) Gilles Müller	(Australia) John-Patrick Smith	6–3, 6–3

=== Doubles ===
Year	Champion	Runner-up	Score
2026	(New Zealand) Finn Reynolds (New Zealand) James Watt	(India) Anirudh Chandrasekar (New Zealand) Ajeet Rai	6–3, 6–2
2025	(United States) Nathaniel Lammons (Netherlands) Jean-Julien Rojer	(Japan) Kaito Uesugi (Japan) Seita Watanabe	7–6^{(7–4)}, 7–6^{(8–6)}
2024	(Chinese Taipei) Ray Ho (South Korea) Nam Ji-sung	(Japan) Toshihide Matsui (Japan) Kaito Uesugi	6–2, 6–2
2020–23	Not held		
2019	(India) Sriram Balaji (Israel) Jonathan Erlich	(Netherlands) Sander Arends (Austria) Tristan-Samuel Weissborn	6–3, 6–2
2018	(Australia) Matthew Ebden (Australia) Andrew Whittington	(India) Prajnesh Gunneswaran (India) Saketh Myneni	6–4, 5–7, [10–6]
2017	(Switzerland) Marco Chiudinelli (Croatia) Franko Škugor	(Thailand) Sanchai Ratiwatana (Thailand) Sonchat Ratiwatana	4–6, 6–2, [10–5]
2016	(Chinese Taipei) Hsieh Cheng-peng (Chinese Taipei) Yang Tsung-hua	(Denmark) Frederik Nielsen (Republic of Ireland) David O'Hare	7–6^{(8–6)}, 6–4
2015	(Australia) Matthew Ebden (Chinese Taipei) Wang Chieh-fu	(Thailand) Sanchai Ratiwatana (Thailand) Sonchat Ratiwatana	6–1, 6–4
2014	(Australia) Samuel Groth (Australia) Chris Guccione	(United States) Austin Krajicek (Australia) John-Patrick Smith	6–4, 5–7, [10–8]

== See also ==
- List of sporting events in Taiwan
