= 2024 Szczecin Open – Doubles =

Doubles
- 2024 Szczecin Open

Final
- Champions: (Argentina) Guido Andreozzi (France) Théo Arribagé
- Runners-up: (United States) Ryan Seggerman (Poland) Szymon Walków
- Score: 6–2, 6–1

Events
Singles	Doubles
- Szczecin Open

Andrew Paulson and Vitaliy Sachko were the defending champions but only Paulson chose to defend his title, partnering Michael Vrbenský. They withdrew from the tournament before their first round match.

Guido Andreozzi and Théo Arribagé won the title after defeating Ryan Seggerman and Szymon Walków 6–2, 6–1 in the final.

== Seeds ==
1. (Argentina) Guido Andreozzi / (France) Théo Arribagé (champions)
2. (Germany) Jakob Schnaitter / (Germany) Mark Wallner (first round)
3. (Italy) Marco Bortolotti / (Spain) Sergio Martos Gornés (first round)
4. (Czech Republic) Petr Nouza / (Czech Republic) Patrik Rikl (semifinals)

== Draw ==
Key

- Q = Qualifier
- WC = Wild card
- LL = Lucky loser
- Alt = Alternate
- ITF = ITF entry
- PR = Protected ranking
- SR = Special ranking
- SE = Special exempt
- JE = Junior exempt
- JR = Junior Accelerator Programme entrant
- CO = College Accelerator Programme entrant
- NG = Next Gen Accelerator Program entrant
- w/o = Walkover
- r = Retired
- d = Defaulted

=== Draw ===
First round
1	(Argentina) G Andreozzi (France) T Arribagé	6	6
(Germany) D Altmaier (Venezuela) LD Martínez	3	3
WC	(Poland) T Berkieta (Poland) D Michalski	1	6^{4}
(Spain) Í Cervantes (France) J Eysseric	6	7^{7}
4	(Czech Republic) P Nouza (Czech Republic) P Rikl	6	7^{8}
(Serbia) I Sabanov (Serbia) M Sabanov	4	6^{6}
Alt	(Italy) J Berrettini (Czech Republic) V Kopřiva
(Spain) J Barranco Cosano (United States) N Moreno de Alboran	w/o
(Argentina) P Cachín (Argentina) F Coria	2	1
(United States) R Seggerman (Poland) S Walków	6	6
WC	(Poland) S Kielan (Poland) F Pieczonka	2	7	[10]
3	(Italy) M Bortolotti (Spain) S Martos Gornés	6	5	[8]
Alt	(France) M Chazal; A Vatutin
(Romania) A Jecan (Italy) G Ricca	w/o
(Italy) A Pellegrino (Kazakhstan) D Popko	7^{7}	6
2	(Germany) J Schnaitter (Germany) M Wallner	6^{3}	3

Quarterfinals
1	(Argentina) G Andreozzi (France) T Arribagé	6	7^{7}
(Spain) Í Cervantes (France) J Eysseric	2	6^{3}
4	(Czech Republic) P Nouza (Czech Republic) P Rikl	6	6
(Spain) J Barranco Cosano (United States) N Moreno de Alboran	2	2
(United States) R Seggerman (Poland) S Walków	7^{7}	7^{9}
WC	(Poland) S Kielan (Poland) F Pieczonka	6^{2}	6^{7}
(Romania) A Jecan (Italy) G Ricca	3	6	[8]
(Italy) A Pellegrino (Kazakhstan) D Popko	6	1	[10]

Semifinals
1	(Argentina) G Andreozzi (France) T Arribagé	7^{10}	7
4	(Czech Republic) P Nouza (Czech Republic) P Rikl	6^{8}	5
(United States) R Seggerman (Poland) S Walków	6	6
(Italy) A Pellegrino (Kazakhstan) D Popko	2	1

Final
1	(Argentina) G Andreozzi (France) T Arribagé	6	6
(United States) R Seggerman (Poland) S Walków	2	1
