= 2022 UniCredit Czech Open – Doubles =

Doubles
- 2022 UniCredit Czech Open

Final
- Champions: (India) Yuki Bhambri (India) Saketh Myneni
- Runners-up: (Czech Republic) Roman Jebavý (Slovakia) Andrej Martin
- Score: 6–3, 7–5

Events
Singles	Doubles
- UniCredit Czech Open

Aleksandr Nedovyesov and Gonçalo Oliveira were the defending champions but chose not to defend their title.

Yuki Bhambri and Saketh Myneni won the title after defeating Roman Jebavý and Andrej Martin 6–3, 7–5 in the final.

== Seeds ==
1. (Austria) Alexander Erler / (Austria) Lucas Miedler (semifinals)
2. (Czech Republic) Roman Jebavý / (Slovakia) Andrej Martin (final)
3. (Ukraine) Denys Molchanov / (Croatia) Franko Škugor (quarterfinals)
4. (Germany) Fabian Fallert / (Venezuela) Luis David Martínez (first round)

== Draw ==
Key

- Q = Qualifier
- WC = Wild card
- LL = Lucky loser
- Alt = Alternate
- ITF = ITF entry
- PR = Protected ranking
- SR = Special ranking
- SE = Special exempt
- JE = Junior exempt
- JR = Junior Accelerator Programme entrant
- CO = College Accelerator Programme entrant
- NG = Next Gen Accelerator Program entrant
- w/o = Walkover
- r = Retired
- d = Defaulted

First round
1	(Austria) A Erler (Austria) L Miedler	6	6
(Czech Republic) D Poljak (Czech Republic) J Veselý	3	2
WC	(Czech Republic) Adam Jurajda (Czech Republic) D Siniakov	4	5
(Uzbekistan) S Fayziev (Greece) M Kalovelonis	6	7
3	(Ukraine) D Molchanov (Croatia) F Škugor	6^{2}	6	[10]
(Argentina) F Coria (Uruguay) M Cuevas	7^{7}	4	[4]
(Switzerland) L Margaroli (Ukraine) V Sachko	5	3
(India) Y Bhambri (India) S Myneni	7	6
Alt	(Lebanon) B Hassan (Germany) L Wessels	6	3	[7]
WC	(Czech Republic) V Kopřiva (Czech Republic) J Pospíšil	2	6	[10]
(India) S Balaji (India) A Kadhe	6	6
4	(Germany) F Fallert (Venezuela) LD Martínez	3	4
(Czech Republic) A Paulson (Czech Republic) D Svrčina	6	6
(France) T Arribagé (France) E Couacaud	1	3
(Argentina) F Díaz Acosta (Peru) A Merino	4	1
2	(Czech Republic) R Jebavý (Slovakia) A Martin	6	6

Quarterfinals
1	(Austria) A Erler (Austria) L Miedler	6	7
(Uzbekistan) S Fayziev (Greece) M Kalovelonis	3	5
3	(Ukraine) D Molchanov (Croatia) F Škugor	6^{4}	6	[11]
(India) Y Bhambri (India) S Myneni	7^{7}	3	[13]
WC	(Czech Republic) V Kopřiva (Czech Republic) J Pospíšil	3	2
(India) S Balaji (India) A Kadhe	6	6
(Czech Republic) A Paulson (Czech Republic) D Svrčina	1	5
2	(Czech Republic) R Jebavý (Slovakia) A Martin	6	7

Semifinals
1	(Austria) A Erler (Austria) L Miedler	4	4
(India) Y Bhambri (India) S Myneni	6	6
(India) S Balaji (India) A Kadhe	7^{7}	5	[7]
2	(Czech Republic) R Jebavý (Slovakia) A Martin	6^{3}	7	[10]

Final
(India) Y Bhambri (India) S Myneni	6	7
2	(Czech Republic) R Jebavý (Slovakia) A Martin	3	5
