= 2014 Shriram Capital P.L. Reddy Memorial Challenger – Doubles =

Doubles
- 2014 Shriram Capital P.L. Reddy Memorial Challenger

Final
- Champions: (India) Yuki Bhambri (New Zealand) Michael Venus
- Runners-up: (India) Sriram Balaji (Slovenia) Blaž Rola
- Score: 6–4, 7–6^{(7–3)}

Events
Singles	Doubles
Shriram Capital P.L. Reddy Memorial Challenger

Second seeds Yuki Bhambri and Michael Venus won the title over Sriram Balaji and Blaž Rola 6–4, 7–6^{(7–3)}.

== Seeds ==
1. (Thailand) Sanchai Ratiwatana / (Thailand) Sonchat Ratiwatana (first round)
2. (India) Yuki Bhambri / (New Zealand) Michael Venus (champions)
3. (Philippines) Ruben Gonzales / (New Zealand) Artem Sitak (semifinals)
4. (Spain) Gerard Granollers / (Spain) Adrián Menéndez-Maceiras (quarterfinals)

== Draw ==
=== Key ===
- Q = Qualifier
- WC = Wild card
- LL = Lucky loser
- Alt = Alternate
- SE = Special exempt
- PR = Protected ranking
- ITF = ITF entry
- JE = Junior exempt
- w/o = Walkover
- r = Retired
- d = Defaulted
- SR = Special ranking

=== Draw ===
First round
1	(Thailand) Sa Ratiwatana (Thailand) So Ratiwatana	7	5	[6]
(India) Sriram Balaji (Slovenia) B Rola	5	7	[10]
(Serbia) I Bozoljac (India) S Devvarman	4	7^{7}	[3]
(Canada) S Diez (Spain) D Muñoz de la Nava	6	6^{4}	[10]
4	(Spain) G Granollers (Spain) A Menéndez-Maceiras	4	6	[10]
(Russia) V Baluda (Russia) A Kudryavtsev	6	3	[8]
WC	(India) J Nedunchezhiyan (India) R Ramanathan	3	4
(Chinese Taipei) T Chen (Slovakia) M Semjan	6	6
WC	(India) S Myneni (India) S Singh	6	4	[10]
(Chinese Taipei) H-y Peng (Chinese Taipei) Yang T-h	2	6	[12]
(France) D Guez (France) L Pouille	2	0
3	(Philippines) R Gonzales (New Zealand) A Sitak	6	6
WC	(India) P Gunneswaran (India) MM Jayaprakash	6	2	[5]
(Italy) T Fabbiano (Argentina) A Velotti	2	6	[10]
PR	(South Africa) R Roelofse (South Africa) I van der Merwe	3	3
2	(India) Y Bhambri (New Zealand) M Venus	6	6

Quarterfinals
(India) Sriram Balaji (Slovenia) B Rola	6	6
(Canada) S Diez (Spain) D Muñoz de la Nava	3	2
4	(Spain) G Granollers (Spain) A Menéndez-Maceiras	7^{7}	4	[6]
(Chinese Taipei) T Chen (Slovakia) M Semjan	6^{5}	6	[10]
(Chinese Taipei) H-y Peng (Chinese Taipei) Yang T-h	4	5
3	(Philippines) R Gonzales (New Zealand) A Sitak	6	7
(Italy) T Fabbiano (Argentina) A Velotti	2	3
2	(India) Y Bhambri (New Zealand) M Venus	6	6

Semifinals
(India) Sriram Balaji (Slovenia) B Rola	6	7^{7}
(Chinese Taipei) T Chen (Slovakia) M Semjan	3	6^{5}
3	(Philippines) R Gonzales (New Zealand) A Sitak	2	1
2	(India) Y Bhambri (New Zealand) M Venus	6	6

Final
(India) Sriram Balaji (Slovenia) B Rola	4	6^{3}
2	(India) Y Bhambri (New Zealand) M Venus	6	7^{7}
