= 2014 Shriram Capital P.L. Reddy Memorial Challenger – Singles =

Singles
- 2014 Shriram Capital P.L. Reddy Memorial Challenger

Final
- Champion: (India) Yuki Bhambri
- Runner-up: (Russia) Alexander Kudryavtsev
- Score: 4–6, 6–3, 7–5

Events
Singles	Doubles
Shriram Capital P.L. Reddy Memorial Challenger

Yuki Bhambri is the first winner of the event, defeating Alexander Kudryavtsev in the final 4–6, 6–3, 7–5.

== Seeds ==
1. (India) Somdev Devvarman (semifinals)
2. (Russia) Evgeny Donskoy (semifinals)
3. (Slovenia) Blaz Rola (second round)
4. (Ukraine) Illya Marchenko (second round)
5. (Moldova) Radu Albot (first round)
6. (France) David Guez (first round)
7. (India) Yuki Bhambri (champion)
8. (Italy) Thomas Fabbiano (second round)

== Draw ==
=== Key ===
- Q = Qualifier
- WC = Wild card
- LL = Lucky loser
- Alt = Alternate
- SE = Special exempt
- PR = Protected ranking
- ITF = ITF entry
- JE = Junior exempt
- w/o = Walkover
- r = Retired
- d = Defaulted
- SR = Special ranking

=== Finals ===
Semifinals
1	(India) Somdev Devvarman	2	4
7	(India) Yuki Bhambri	6	6
(Russia) Alexander Kudryavtsev	7^{7}	6
2	(Russia) Evgeny Donskoy	6^{4}	3

Final
7	(India) Yuki Bhambri	4	6	7
(Russia) Alexander Kudryavtsev	6	3	5

=== Top half ===
First round
1	(India) S Devvarman	7	5
WC	(India) R Ramanathan	5	4^{r}
WC	(India) J Nedunchezhiyan	7^{7}	6^{1}	1
Q	(New Zealand) M Venus	6^{3}	7^{7}	6
(Spain) J Samper-Montaña	6	7^{11}
(Spain) A Menéndez-Maceiras	4	6^{9}
(Canada) S Diez	6	3	7
5	(Moldova) R Albot	1	6	5
4	(Ukraine) I Marchenko	7	7
(Spain) D Muñoz de la Nava	5	5
(France) L Pouille	6	6
(Chinese Taipei) T Chen	3	3
Q	(Russia) V Baluda	3	2
(Spain) G Granollers	6	6
(Chinese Taipei) Huang L-c	2	4
7	(India) Y Bhambri	6	6

Second round
1	(India) S Devvarman	6^{4}	6	6
Q	(New Zealand) M Venus	7^{7}	0	3
(Spain) J Samper-Montaña	6	3
(Canada) S Diez	4	1^{r}
4	(Ukraine) I Marchenko	3	6	3
(France) L Pouille	6	3	6
(Spain) G Granollers	2	1
7	(India) Y Bhambri	6	6

Quarterfinals
1	(India) S Devvarman	0
(Spain) J Samper-Montaña	0^{r}
(France) L Pouille	6	2	2
7	(India) Y Bhambri	3	6	6

Semifinals
1	(India) S Devvarman	2	4
7	(India) Y Bhambri	6	6

=== Top half ===
First round
8	(Italy) T Fabbiano	6	6
(Greece) T Angelinos	3	0
WC	(India) S Myneni	6	6
(Egypt) M Safwat	4	2
(Serbia) I Bozoljac	1	2
(Russia) A Kudryavtsev	6	6
(Argentina) A Velotti	5	6^{5}
3	(Slovenia) B Rola	7	7^{7}
6	(France) D Guez	4	5
Q	(India) S Singh	6	7
WC	(India) N. S. Balaji	6	6
Q	(India) P Gunneswaran	3	3
(Chinese Taipei) Yang T-h	6	4	3
(Portugal) R Machado	3	6	6
(France) A Michon	2	3
2	(Russia) E Donskoy	6	6

Second round
8	(Italy) T Fabbiano	3	2
WC	(India) S Myneni	6	6
(Russia) A Kudryavtsev	6	6
3	(Slovenia) B Rola	4	4
Q	(India) S Singh	6	4	7^{7}
WC	(India) N. S. Balaji	1	6	6^{1}
(Portugal) R Machado	3	6	6^{0}
2	(Russia) E Donskoy	6	3	7^{7}

Quarterfinals
WC	(India) S Myneni	0	2
(Russia) A Kudryavtsev	6	6
Q	(India) S Singh	5	4
2	(Russia) E Donskoy	7	6

Semifinals
(Russia) A Kudryavtsev	7^{7}	6
2	(Russia) E Donskoy	6^{4}	3
