= 2024 Szczecin Open =

- Date: 9–15 September
- Edition: 31st
- Surface: Clay
- Location: Szczecin, Poland

Champions

Singles
- (Czech Republic) Vít Kopřiva

Doubles
- (Argentina) Guido Andreozzi / (France) Théo Arribagé
- Szczecin Open

The 2024 Invest in Szczecin Open was a professional tennis tournament played on clay courts. It was the 31st edition of the tournament which was part of the 2024 ATP Challenger Tour. It took place in Szczecin, Poland between 9 and 15 September 2024.

== Singles main-draw entrants ==
=== Seeds ===
| Country | Player | Rank^{1} | Seed |
|---|---|---|---|
| BRA | Thiago Seyboth Wild | 68 | 1 |
| ARG | Federico Coria | 79 | 2 |
| ESP | Jaume Munar | 84 | 3 |
| GER | Daniel Altmaier | 89 | 4 |
| CZE | Vít Kopřiva | 118 | 5 |
| ESP | Albert Ramos Viñolas | 122 | 6 |
| COL | Daniel Elahi Galán | 127 | 7 |
| ITA | Stefano Napolitano | 135 | 8 |

^{1} Rankings are as of 26 August 2024.

=== Other entrants ===
The following players received wildcards into the singles main draw:

- (Poland) Tomasz Berkieta
- (Poland) Daniel Michalski
- (Poland) Olaf Pieczkowski

The following player received entry into the singles main draw as a special exempt:

- (United Kingdom) Jan Choinski

The following player received entry into the singles main draw as an alternate:

- (Czech Republic) Michael Vrbenský

The following players received entry from the qualifying draw:

- (Czech Republic) Hynek Bartoň
- (Italy) Jacopo Berrettini
- (Germany) Lucas Gerch
- (Czech Republic) Andrew Paulson
- (Germany) Max Hans Rehberg
- Alexey Vatutin

The following player received entry as a lucky loser:

- (Germany) Sebastian Fanselow

== Champions ==
=== Singles ===
- (Czech Republic) Vít Kopřiva def. (Italy) Andrea Pellegrino 7–5, 6–2.

=== Doubles ===
- (Argentina) Guido Andreozzi / (France) Théo Arribagé def. (United States) Ryan Seggerman / (Poland) Szymon Walków 6–2, 6–1.
