= Yuki Bhambri =

Indian tennis player (born 1992)

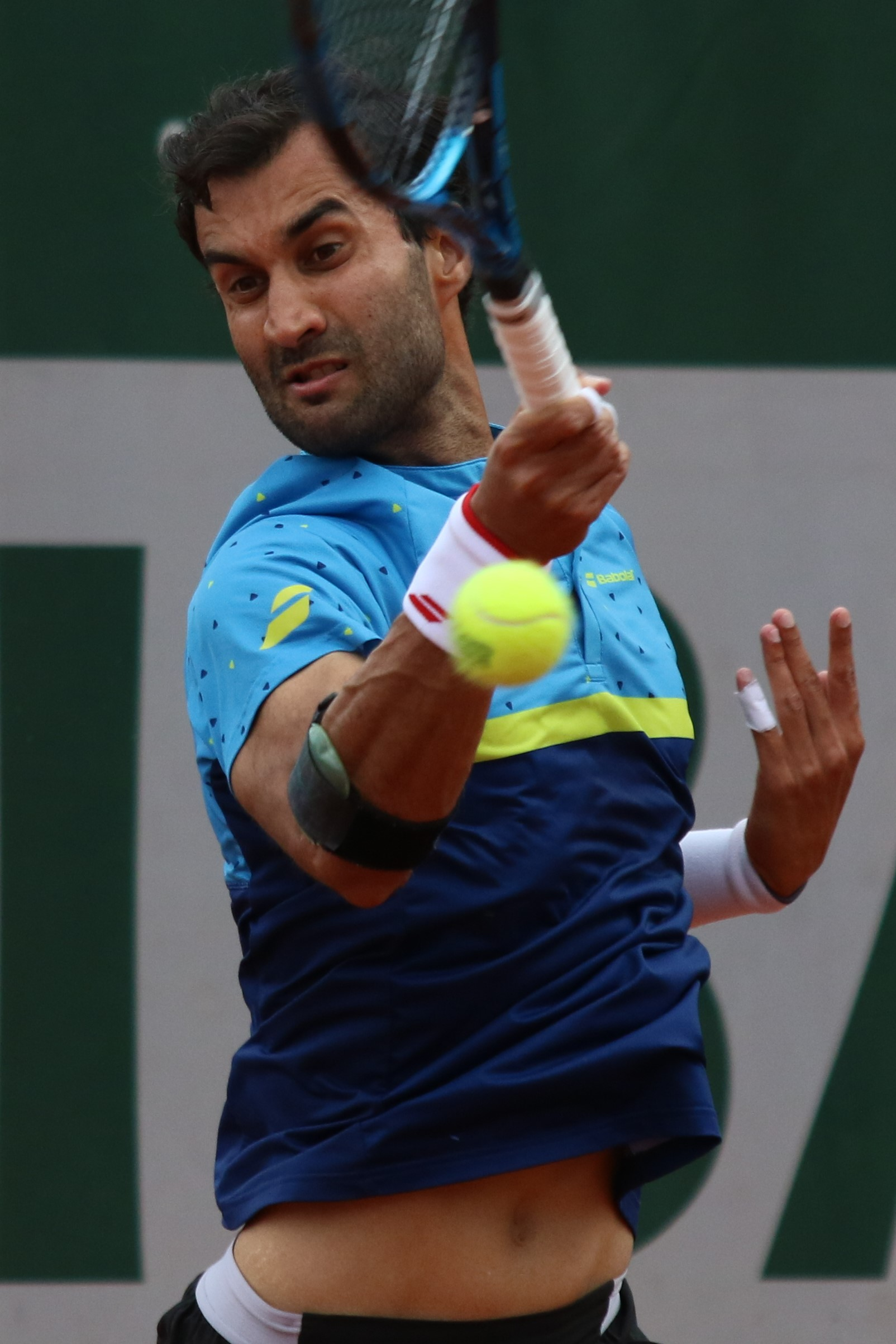
- Bhambri at the 2022 French Open
- Country (sports): India
- Residence: Bradenton, Florida, United States
- Born: 4 July 1992 (age 34) New Delhi, India
- Height: 1.85 m (6 ft 1 in)
- Turned pro: 2008
- Plays: Right-handed (two-handed backhand)
- Coach: Ankita Bhambri
- Prize money: US$2,337,502

Singles
- Career record: 28–33
- Career titles: 0
- Highest ranking: No. 83 (16 April 2018)

Grand Slam singles results
- Australian Open: 1R (2015, 2016, 2018)
- French Open: 1R (2018)
- Wimbledon: 1R (2018)
- US Open: 1R (2018)

Doubles
- Career record: 112–99
- Career titles: 5
- Highest ranking: No. 18 (9 February 2026)
- Current ranking: No. 46 (26 October 2026)

Grand Slam doubles results
- Australian Open: 3R (2014, 2026)
- French Open: 3R (2025)
- Wimbledon: 3R (2025)
- US Open: SF (2025)

Grand Slam mixed doubles results
- Australian Open: 1R (2026)
- French Open: 2R (2026)
- Wimbledon: 2R (2025)

Team competitions
- Davis Cup: 1R (2010)
Medal record
Representing India
Men's tennis
Asian Games
| Bronze medal – third place | 2014 Incheon | Singles |
| Bronze medal – third place | 2014 Incheon | Doubles |
Youth Olympic Games
| Silver medal – second place | 2010 Singapore | Singles |
Commonwealth Youth Games
| Silver medal – second place | 2008 Pune | Doubles |
| Bronze medal – third place | 2008 Pune | Singles |
- Last updated on: 15 July 2026.

Yuki Bhambri (born 4 July 1992) is an Indian professional tennis player who currently specializes in doubles. He has an ATP career-high doubles ranking of world No. 18 achieved on 9 February 2026 and a career-high singles ranking of No. 83 achieved on 16 April 2018.

He is a former junior No. 1 and winner of the 2009 Australian Open Junior Championship. He is the first Indian to win the junior Australian Open title and the fourth Indian in history to capture a junior singles title at a Grand Slam championship. He represents India in the Davis Cup.

== Personal and early life ==
He started playing tennis at the age of 6 years. His father is Chander and mother is Indu. He is the youngest in the family. His sisters are Ankita Bhambri and Sanaa Bhambri, and he is the cousin of Prerna Bhambri and Prateek Bhambri, all of whom are professional tennis players. His early career tennis coach was Aditya Sachdeva. He is currently being coached by Stephen Koon, Impact Tennis Academy, and is accompanied by trainer Abhimanu Singh & Ahmad Nasir. Bhambri became mentor of the tennis facilities of RoundGlass Sports in 2024.

== Junior career ==
Bhambri reached the junior No. 1 ranking in the world in February 2009. He won the Junior Australian Open Boys singles title in 2009 by beating Alexandros-Ferdinandos Georgoudas of Greece in the finals.

He competed in all the junior Grand Slams in 2008. He lost at the 2008 Australian Open Boys' Singles in the semifinals to eventual champion Bernard Tomic.

Yuki concluded his season by making history as the first Indian winner of the prestigious Orange Bowl at age 16, beating Jarmere Jenkins of the U.S. in straight sets.

In 2009, Bhambri began the year by winning the junior Australian Open, defeating Alexandros Georgoudas from Greece in the final in only 57 minutes. Throughout the tournament he dropped only one set, becoming the first Indian singles winner of the junior Australian Open and the fourth Indian in history to capture a junior singles grand slam title.

== Professional career ==
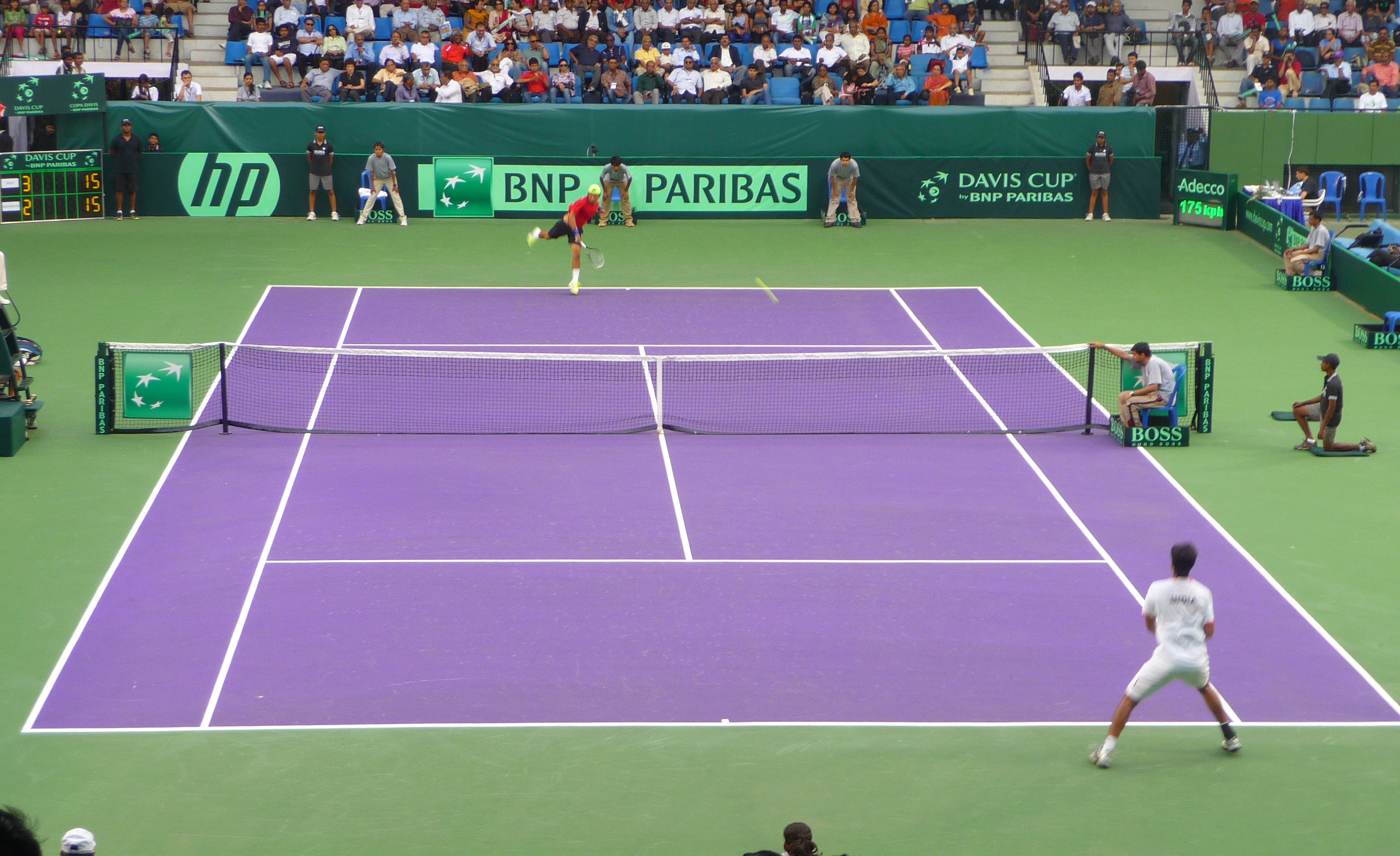
Bhambri in action during a Davis Cup tie against Indonesia in April 2013

=== 2009: First ITF title and Davis cup debut ===
Yuki obtained a wild card spot in the doubles main draw pairing with Harsh Mankad at the Chennai Open. At the same event he received a wildcard spot in the singles qualifying draw in the Chennai Open where he lost to compatriot Sanam Singh in three sets. Yuki also obtained a wild card position for the 2010 Australian Open qualifying draw as an additional reward for his win at the 2009 Junior Australian Open. After his win in the Orange Bowl, Yuki received a spot in the main draw of the Sony Ericsson Open where he lost to Diego Junqueira in the first round. Following his showing at the Sony Ericsson Open, Yuki played in an ITF Futures Event in New Delhi, India, where he won the tournament, becoming the youngest Indian to win a Futures event; Yuki continued this winning streak by capturing the title of the following Futures event held in the same venue. Yuki made his Davis Cup debut against South Africa in the World Group play-offs.

=== 2010: Youth Olympic Games Silver medal ===
In August, Bhambri advanced to the finals of the first Youth Olympic Games in Singapore by defeating Damir Džumhur in three sets. He played Colombian Juan Sebastián Gómez in the finals. After suffering cramps in his thigh, he conceded the match with the score at 1–4 in the third set. This gave him a silver medal at the Youth Olympics.

=== 2012: First Challenger singles and doubles titles ===
In May, Yuki won his first ATP men's doubles challenger title with compatriot Divij Sharan at the Busan Challenger. They defeated the Taiwanese duo of Hsieh Cheng-peng and Lee Hsin-han in the finals.

A week later, he defeated Amir Weintraub in straight sets to win the first ATP Challenger singles title of his career in Fergana, Uzbekistan on 20 May 2012.

=== 2013: Second Challenger singles title ===
He reached his first ATP Challenger final of the season at Kaohsiung, Taiwan. He lost to Chinese Taipei's Lu Yen-hsun in the final.

He won his first ATP Challenger singles title of the season and the second of his career at Traralgon, Australia, defeating American Bradley Klahn in the final.

=== 2014: Australian Open doubles third round ===
Bhambri entered the 2014 Australian Open in both singles and doubles. He lost to Potito Starace in the first round of the singles qualifying draw. He entered the men's doubles with Michael Venus from New Zealand as his partner. They defeated Roberto Bautista Agut and Daniel Gimeno Traver in the first round. In the second round, the pair shocked tenth-seeded Jean-Julien Rojer and Horia Tecău by defeating them in straight sets. They finally lost to the 5th-seeded Indo-Czech pair of Leander Paes and Radek Štěpánek in the third round.

On 8 February 2014, Bhambri won his third ATP Challenger singles title at the Sriram Capital PL Reddy Memorial ATP Challenger tennis tournament in Chennai. He defeated Alexander Kudryavtsev of Russia in three sets in the final. He also won the doubles title at the same event with his partner Michael Venus of New Zealand. The pair defeated the Indo-Slovak combination of Sriram Balaji and Blaž Rola in the doubles final.

Later in the year, Bhambri won two medals for India at the 2014 Asian Games. He won bronze in the men's singles category, losing to Japan's Yoshihito Nishioka in the semifinals. He also won bronze in the men's doubles category with Divij Sharan as his partner. The pair lost in the semifinals to the Korean pair of Lim Yong-kyu and Chung Hyeon.

=== 2015: Top 100 ===
Starting the year as 315th-ranked player in the ATP rankings, Bhambri qualified for the 2015 Australian Open, but lost to Great Britain's Andy Murray in the first round in straight sets.

He then entered the 2015 Delhi Open as a wildcard and reached the finals, losing to Somdev Devvarman in three sets 3–6, 6–4, 6–0. He maintained his good start of the season and reached the semifinals of the Kazan Kremlin Cup. On 13 September, he defeated Wu Di in the finals of the Shanghai Challenger in three sets 3–6, 6–0, 7–6^{(7–3)} to win his first title of the season, which helped him reach no. 125 in the ATP rankings. He reached the finals at the OEC Kaohsiung, losing to Hyeon Chung in straight sets 7–5, 6–4.

He broke into the top 100 for the first time in his career on 19 October 2015. He won his first title in India on 31 October, defeating Evgeny Donskoy in straight sets 6–2, 7–6^{(7–4)} in Pune. As a result of his good run, he rose to a career-best ranking of 88 on 9 November. He finished the year ranked 93rd.

=== 2016: Struggles with injury ===
Bhambri entered the main draw of the Australian Open for the second consecutive year. He lost in the first round to sixth-seeded Tomáš Berdych in straight sets.

In February he won his sixth doubles Challenger title at the 2016 Delhi Open, partnering with Mahesh Bhupathi.

Bhambri was out of action from March to September because of an elbow injury. This caused his ranking to drop out of the top 500.

=== 2017: First ATP 500 quarterfinal ===
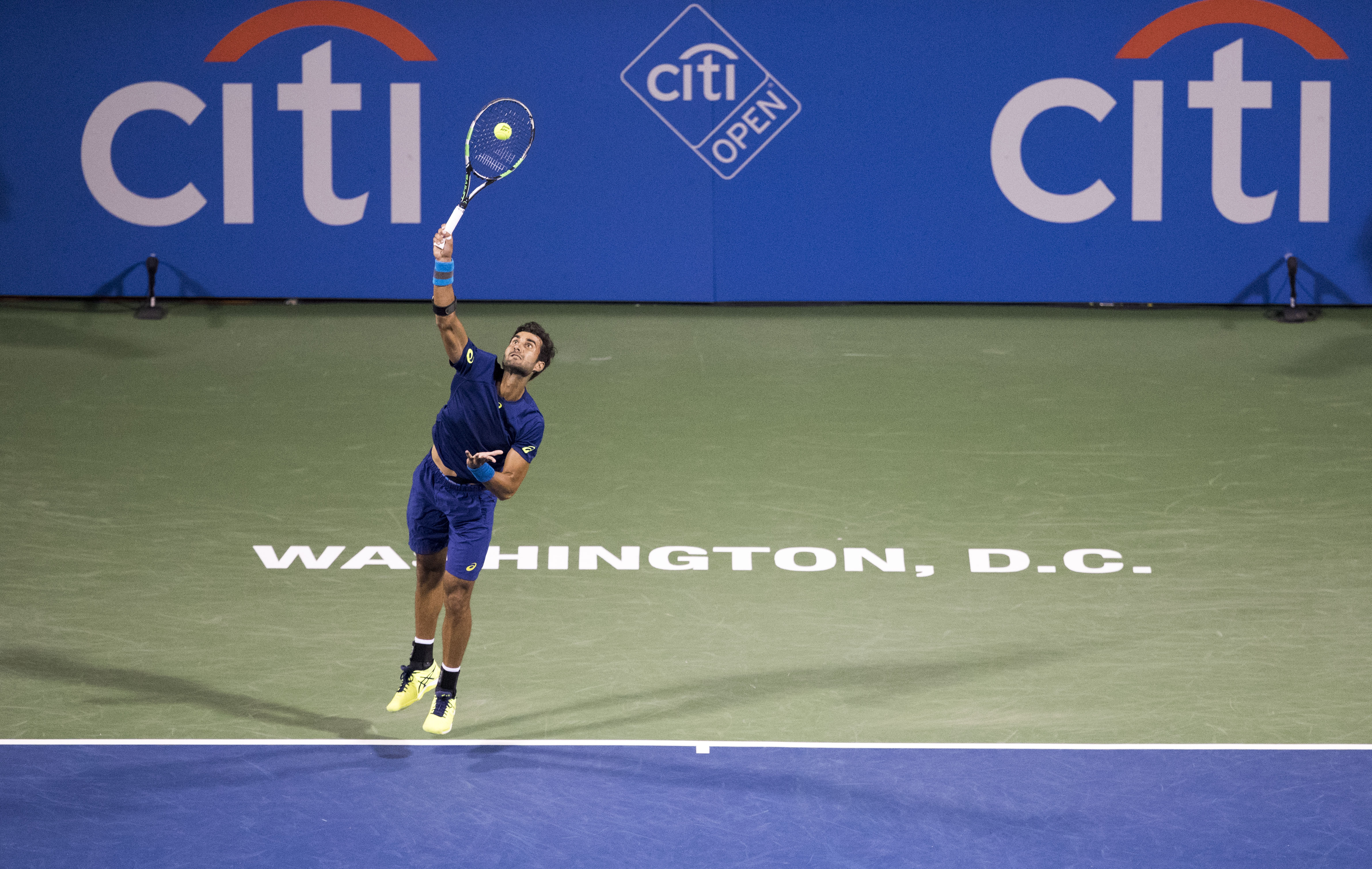
Bhambri in Action during 2017 Citi Open

Bhambri started his 2017 campaign at the Chennai Open. He qualified for the main draw, where he defeated compatriot Ramkumar Ramanathan in the first round, before losing in round 2 to Benoît Paire. At the Australian Open, he lost in the final qualifying round to Ernesto Escobedo.

In July, Bhambri reached the quarterfinals at the Citi Open in Washington, D.C. This was his second quarterfinal on the ATP World Tour, and his first at an ATP 500-level event. Bhambri defeated Stefan Kozlov in the first round and shocked 6th seed and defending champion Gaël Monfils in the second round. He then defeated Guido Pella to reach the quarterfinals where he lost to eventual finalist Kevin Anderson.

In October, Bhambri teamed up with Divij Sharan to enter the Tashkent Challenger. They finished as runners-up, losing to the pair of Hans Podlipnik Castillo and Andrei Vasilevski in the final. In November, he won his second Pune Challenger title, defeating compatriot Ramkumar Ramanathan in the final. This was his sixth Challenger singles title.

=== 2018: Return to top 100 in singles, French Open doubles win ===
Yuki started the year with the Tata Open Maharashtra in Pune where he entered the main draw. He defeated compatriot Arjun Kadhe in the opening round but lost to Frenchman Pierre-Hugues Herbert in the second round. He then entered the qualifying draw of the Australian Open and qualified for the main draw for the third time. He could not proceed further, losing to Marcos Baghdatis in straight sets 7–6^{(7–4)}, 6–4, 6–3 in the first round. In February, Yuki entered the inaugural Chennai Challenger. He reached the final but lost to top seed Jordan Thompson in 3 sets.

In March, he entered the Indian Wells Masters and qualified for the main draw. He defeated Nicolas Mahut in the opening round. In the second round he upset then-world no. 12 Lucas Pouille in straight sets. He eventually lost to Sam Querrey in the third round. Bhambri carried his good form to the next masters at the Miami Open where he qualified for main draw. There he defeated Mirza Bašić in the first round before bowing out in the second round with a loss to Jack Sock.

In April, Bhambri won the first Challenger title of the season at the Santaizi Challenger by defeating compatriot Ramkumar Ramanathan. With this win he returned to the top 100 in the singles rankings.

On the back of his improved rankings, Yuki earned direct entry into the 2018 French Open. This was his first match in the main draw at the event. He lost in the first round to Ruben Bemelmans in straight sets. He also entered the doubles draw with compatriot Divij Sharan. The pair advanced to the second round where they lost to second seeds and eventual finalists Oliver Marach and Mate Pavić.

Yuki also got direct entry into the 2018 Wimbledon Championships for the first time. He lost in the opening round to Italian qualifier Thomas Fabbiano.

In August, Yuki opted to play at the 2018 US Open instead of representing India at the Asian Games. With his participation at the US Open he completed playing in the main draw at all four grand slams. But he could not earn his maiden win at a slam event, losing in the opening round to Pierre-Hugues Herbert.

Soon after the US Open, Yuki started struggling with injuries. The correct diagnosis for which was made by Rafael Nadal's doctor.

=== 2021: Brief return to tour ===
After being inactive for over two and a half years due to injury, Bhambri returned to the tour at the 2021 Singapore Open when he received a protected ranking spot into the main draw. He lost in the first round to wildcard Matthew Ebden in straight sets.

One week later, Bhambri won an ITF doubles title in India partnering Saketh Myneni. It would be his first title win in almost three years and the result would push him back into the ATP rankings in doubles.

Bhambri received a protected ranking into the qualifying draw of the 2021 Dubai Open. There, he defeated compatriots Prajnesh Gunneswaran and Ramkumar Ramanathan to qualify for the main draw where he lost in the first round to Aljaž Bedene in three sets. The result would push him back into the ATP rankings in singles.

Bhambri partnered Matthew Ebden in doubles at the 2021 Orlando Open. The pair won their first round match but withdrew from their second round match due to an injury. Bhambri ended the season with a title at ITF India Futures 6 with compatriot Saketh Myneni defeating compatriots S D Prajwal Dev and Rishi Reddy 6–4, 7-6(6) in straight sets.

=== 2022 ===
==== Bad form (January–February) ====
Bhambri started the year at the Melbourne Summer Set where he partnered Michael Venus in the doubles but they lost in the first round to Tallon Griekspoor and Andrea Vavassori 4–6, 4–6.

At the Australian Open, he was out in the qualifying round where he lost to Tomáš Macháč 1–6, 3–6 in the second round. Bhambri lost in round of 16 of both singles and doubles of 2022 Maharashtra Open. In the singles event he lost to Stefano Travaglia 3–6, 2–6. In the doubles event, he partnered Divij Sharan where they lost to compatriots Saketh Myneni and Sasi Kumar Mukund 3–6, 4–6. He and Divij then lost in quarterfinals of Bengaluru Challenger to 2nd seeds Alexander Erler and Vít Kopřiva 4–6, 3–6. At the Bengaluru Challenger 2, he and Divij lost to compatriots Ramkumar Ramanathan and Saketh Myneni 1–6, 5–7. He then was in the qualifying round of Dubai Championships where he upset João Sousa 6–3, 3–6 and 7–6 (7–5) in the 1st round. But just missed to qualify for the main draw by losing to Christopher O'Connell 3–6, 4–6.

==== Success with Saketh Myneni (starting in March) ====
Bhambri won the ITF India F1 tournament with Saketh Myneni after being 2nd seed by defeating compatriots Lohithaksha Bathrinath and Abhinav Sanmugam 6–4,6–1. He and Saketh then were 3rd seeds at ITF India F2 but they lost to 2nd seed compatriots Vishnu Vardhan and Sasi Kumar Mukund 3–6,6–2 and 8–10. But they won the next tournament India F3 by defeating compatriots Vishnu Vardhan and Anirudh Chandrasekhar 6–4,6–2. He and Saketh then entered Salinas Challenger, they upset top seeds compatriots Ramkumar Ramanathan and Jeevan Nedunchezhiyan 6–3,7–6(8–6). They went on to win the tournament by defeating 2nd seeds JC Aragone and Roberto Quiroz in the final 4–6,6–3 and 10–7. Bhambri and Myneni then made it to the quarterfinals of Sarasota Open and Tallahassee Open where they lost to American pair of Alex Lawson and Reese Stalder 6–7,6–3,7–10 and Cristian Rodríguez and Diego Hidalgo 3–6,4–6 respectively. They then lost in the semifinals of Morelos Open to Nicolás Mejía and Roberto Quiroz after upsetting fourth seeds Skander Mansouri and Michail Pervolarakis in straight sets. Bhambri then entered Open du Pays d'Aix with Ramkumar Ramanathan. They upset top seeds Austin Krajicek and Hugo Nys in the quarterfinals, but lost in the semifinals to eventual champions Titouan Droguet and Kyrian Jacquet in a tiebreak. He and Saketh lost second seeds Sabanov brothers Ivan and Matej in a tiebreak.

He received a protected ranking in French Open men's singles qualifiers but lost to Altuğ Çelikbilek in straight sets. Bhambri won the Prostějov Challenger with Myneni. They won by defeating third seeds Denys Molchanov and Franko Škugor in the quarterfinals, top seeds Alexander Erler and Lucas Miedler in the semifinals in straight sets and second seeds Roman Jebavý and Andrej Martin in the final to capture the title.

=== 2023-25: Doubles success: Maiden ATP title, Wimbledon & top 25 debuts ===
He entered the 2023 Australian Open as a wildcard pair with Saketh Myneni. He won his first Grand Slam match as a pair with Myneni, and recorded only his second career doubles win at the 2023 French Open, defeating wildcards Arthur Rinderknech and Enzo Couacaud.

He won his first ATP title at the 2023 Mallorca Championships with Lloyd Harris. He moved up to world No. 58 in the ATP doubles rankings on 3 July 2023. He made his debut at the 2023 Wimbledon Championships as an alternate pair with Myneni. He reached his second career doubles final at the 2023 Stockholm Open with Julian Cash.

He won his second title at the 2024 BMW Open with Albano Olivetti. Following a fourth career final at the 2024 ATP Lyon Open with Olivetti, he reached a new career-high ranking of No. 51 on 10 June 2024. He reached the top 50 in the doubles rankings two weeks later on 24 June 2024. The pair reached the final at the Chengdu Open in September, losing to Sadio Doumbia and Fabien Reboul.

Bhambri won the biggest title of his career at the 2025 Dubai Tennis Championships with new partner Alexei Popyrin defeating second seeds Harri Heliövaara and Henry Patten.

== Performance timeline ==
Key
| W | F | SF | QF | #R | RR | Q# | P# | DNQ | A | Z# | PO | G | S | B | NMS | NTI | P | NH |

(W) winner; (F) finalist; (SF) semifinalist; (QF) quarterfinalist; (#R) rounds 4, 3, 2, 1; (RR) round-robin stage; (Q#) qualification round; (P#) preliminary round; (DNQ) did not qualify; (A) absent; (Z#) Davis/Fed Cup Zonal Group (with number indication) or (PO) play-off; (G) gold, (S) silver or (B) bronze Olympic/Paralympic medal; (NMS) not a Masters tournament; (NTI) not a Tier I tournament; (P) postponed; (NH) not held; (SR) strike rate (events won / competed); (W–L) win–loss record.
To avoid confusion and double counting, these charts are updated at the conclusion of a tournament or when the player's participation has ended.

=== Singles ===
Current through the 2023 Davis Cup.

| Tournament | 2009 | 2010 | 2011 | 2012 | 2013 | 2014 | 2015 | 2016 | 2017 | 2018 | 2019 | 2020 | 2021 | 2022 | 2023 | SR | W–L | Win % |
|---|---|---|---|---|---|---|---|---|---|---|---|---|---|---|---|---|---|---|
Grand Slam tournaments
| Australian Open | A | Q1 | A | A | Q1 | Q1 | 1R | 1R | Q3 | 1R | A | A | A | Q2 | | 0 / 3 | 0–3 | 0% |
| French Open | A | A | A | A | A | A | Q2 | A | Q1 | 1R | A | A | A | Q1 | | 0 / 1 | 0–1 | 0% |
| Wimbledon | A | A | A | Q1 | A | A | Q1 | A | A | 1R | A | NH | A | Q1 | | 0 / 1 | 0–1 | 0% |
| US Open | A | A | A | Q2 | A | Q2 | Q1 | A | Q1 | 1R | A | A | A | Q2 | | 0 / 1 | 0–1 | 0% |
| Win–loss | 0–0 | 0–0 | 0–0 | 0–0 | 0–0 | 0–0 | 0–1 | 0–1 | 0–0 | 0–4 | 0–0 | 0–0 | 0–0 | 0–0 | | 0 / 6 | 0–6 | 0% |
ATP Masters 1000
| Indian Wells Masters | A | A | A | A | A | A | A | A | A | 3R | A | NH | A | | | 0 / 1 | 2–1 | 67% |
| Miami Open | 1R | Q1 | A | A | Q1 | A | A | A | A | 2R | A | NH | A | | | 0 / 2 | 1–2 | 33% |
| Win–loss | 0–1 | 0–0 | 0–0 | 0–0 | 0–0 | 0–0 | 0–0 | 0–0 | 0–0 | 3–2 | 0–0 | 0–0 | 0–0 | 0–0 | | 0 / 3 | 3–3 | 50% |
National representation
| Summer Olympics | NH | | | A | NH | | | A | NH | | | | A | | | 0 / 0 | 0–0 | – |
| Davis Cup | PO | A | A | Z1 | Z1 | PO | PO | A | PO | A | A | A | A | | | 0 / 6 | 14–6 | 68% |
| Win–loss | 1–0 | 0–0 | 0–0 | 3–1 | 2–0 | 2–2 | 2–2 | 0–0 | 3–1 | 0–0 | 0–0 | 0–0 | 0–0 | 1–0 | | 0 / 6 | 14–6 | 68% |
Career statistics
| Titles | 0 | 0 | 0 | 0 | 0 | 0 | 0 | 0 | 0 | 0 | 0 | 0 | 0 | 0 | | 0 | | |
| Finals | 0 | 0 | 0 | 0 | 0 | 0 | 0 | 0 | 0 | 0 | 0 | 0 | 0 | 0 | | 0 | | |
| Overall win–loss | 1–1 | 1–1 | 0–1 | 4–2 | 2–1 | 4–3 | 2–3 | 0–3 | 8–4 | 4–10 | 0–0 | 0–0 | 0–2 | 2–1 | 0–1 | 0 / | 28–33 | 46% |
| Year-end ranking | 335 | 505 | 345 | 217 | 195 | 249 | 93 | 532 | 116 | 137 | – | – | 1048 | 551 | 1180 | $913,713 | | |

=== Junior Grand Slam tournaments ===
| Tournament | 2007 | 2008 | 2009 |
|---|---|---|---|
Grand Slam tournaments
| Australian Open | A | SF | W |
| French Open | A | 1R | A |
| Wimbledon | A | 1R | A |
| US Open | Q2 | 2R | QF |

== ATP career finals ==
=== Doubles: 10 (5 titles, 5 runner-ups) ===
| Legend Grand Slam tournaments (0–0) ATP Finals (0–0) ATP World Tour Masters 1000 (0–0) ATP World Tour 500 Series (1–0) ATP World Tour 250 Series (4–5) | Finals by surface Hard (2–2) Clay (2–2) Grass (1–1) | Finals by setting Outdoor (4–3) Indoor (1–1) |

| Result | W–L | Date | Tournament | Tier | Surface | Partner | Opponent | Score |
|---|---|---|---|---|---|---|---|---|
| Win | 1–0 | Jun 2023 | Mallorca Championships, Spain | 250 Series | Grass | (South Africa) Lloyd Harris | (Netherlands) Robin Haase (Austria) Philipp Oswald | 6–3, 6–4 |
| Loss | 1–1 | Oct 2023 | Stockholm Open, Sweden | 250 Series | Hard (i) | (United Kingdom) Julian Cash | (Kazakhstan) Andrey Golubev (Ukraine) Denys Molchanov | 6–7^{(8–10)}, 2–6 |
| Win | 2–1 | Apr 2024 | Bavarian Championships, Germany | 250 Series | Clay | (France) Albano Olivetti | (Germany) Andreas Mies (Germany) Jan-Lennard Struff | 7–6^{(8–6)}, 7–6^{(7–5)} |
| Loss | 2–2 | May 2024 | ATP Lyon Open, France | 250 Series | Clay | (France) Albano Olivetti | (Finland) Harri Heliövaara (United Kingdom) Henry Patten | 6–3, 6–7^{(4–7)}, [8–10] |
| Win | 3–2 | Jul 2024 | Swiss Open Gstaad, Switzerland | 250 Series | Clay | (France) Albano Olivetti | (France) Ugo Humbert (France) Fabrice Martin | 3–6, 6–3, [10–6] |
| Loss | 3–3 | Sep 2024 | Chengdu Open, China | 250 Series | Hard | (France) Albano Olivetti | (France) Sadio Doumbia (France) Fabien Reboul | 4–6, 6–4, [4–10] |
| Win | 4–3 | Mar 2025 | Dubai Tennis Championships, United Arab Emirates | 500 Series | Hard | (Australia) Alexei Popyrin | (Finland) Harri Heliövaara (United Kingdom) Henry Patten | 3–6, 7–6^{(14–12)}, [10–8] |
| Loss | 4–4 | Jun 2025 | Mallorca Championships, Spain | 250 Series | Grass | (United States) Robert Galloway | (Mexico) Santiago González (United States) Austin Krajicek | 1–6, 6–1, [13–15] |
| Loss | 4–5 | May 2026 | Geneva Open, Switzerland | ATP 250 | Clay | (New Zealand) Michael Venus | (Monaco) Romain Arneodo (Australia) Marc Polmans | 6–3, 6–7^{(2–7)}, [7–10] |
| Win | 5–5 | Oct 2026 | Almaty Open, Kazakhstan | ATP 250 | Hard | (United States) Ryan Seggerman | (Austria) Lucas Miedler (Austria) Neil Oberleitner | 7–6^{(7–3)}, 6–7^{(1–7)}, [10–2] |

== Junior Grand Slam finals ==
=== Singles: 1 (1 title) ===
| Result | Year | Tournament | Surface | Opponent | Score |
|---|---|---|---|---|---|
| Win | 2009 | Australian Open | Hard | (Germany) Alexandros Georgoudas | 6–3, 6–1 |

== ATP Challenger and ITF Futures Finals ==
=== Singles: 28 (19 titles, 9 runner-ups) ===
| Legend ATP Challenger (7–5) ITF Futures (12–4) | Finals by surface Hard (18–8) Clay (0–1) Grass (0–0) Carpet (1–0) |

| Result | W–L | Date | Tournament | Tier | Surface | Opponent | Score |
|---|---|---|---|---|---|---|---|
| Win | 1–0 | Apr 2009 | India F3, New Delhi | Futures | Hard | (India) Vishnu Vardhan | 7–6^{(7–1)}, 6–4 |
| Win | 2–0 | May 2009 | India F4, New Delhi | Futures | Hard | (South Africa) Raven Klaasen | 7–6^{(7–5)}, 7–6^{(7–5)} |
| Win | 3–0 | Jul 2009 | India F5, New Delhi | Futures | Hard | (India) Rohan Gajjar | 6–2, 7–6^{(8–6)} |
| Win | 4–0 | Aug 2009 | India F8, New Delhi | Futures | Hard | (India) Vishnu Vardhan | 6–4, 6–3 |
| Win | 5–0 | Oct 2009 | India F10, Kolkata | Futures | Hard | (India) Rupesh Roy | 6–3, 7–6^{(7–4)} |
| Win | 6–0 | Mar 2011 | India F1, Mumbai | Futures | Hard | (Croatia) Roko Karanušić | 2–6, 7–5, 6–3 |
| Loss | 6–1 | Apr 2011 | India F3, Chandigarh | Futures | Hard | (India) Vishnu Vardhan | 6–4, 5–7, 3–6 |
| Win | 7–1 | Oct 2011 | Nigeria F3, Lagos | Futures | Hard | (South Africa) Ruan Roelofse | 7–5, 7–5 |
| Win | 8–1 | May 2012 | Fergana, Uzbekistan | Challenger | Hard | (Israel) Amir Weintraub | 6–3, 6–3 |
| Loss | 8–2 | Apr 2013 | Qatar F2, Doha | Futures | Hard | (Slovakia) Marek Semjan | 6–3, 6–6 ret. |
| Loss | 8–3 | Aug 2013 | Chinese Taipei F1, Taipei City | Futures | Hard | (Chinese Taipei) Huang Liang-chi | 6–4, 5–7 ret. |
| Win | 9–3 | Sep 2013 | Chinese Taipei F2, Taipei City | Futures | Hard | (Japan) Kento Takeuchi | 7–5, 6–4 |
| Loss | 9–4 | Sep 2013 | Kaohsiung, Taiwan | Challenger | Hard | (Chinese Taipei) Lu Yen-hsun | 4–6, 3–6 |
| Win | 10–4 | Nov 2013 | Traralgon, Australia | Challenger | Hard | (United States) Bradley Klahn | 6–7^{(13–15)}, 6–3, 6–4 |
| Win | 11–4 | Nov 2013 | India F9, Delhi | Futures | Hard | (India) N.Sriram Balaji | 6–2, 6–2 |
| Win | 12–4 | Feb 2014 | Chennai, India | Challenger | Hard | (Russia) Alexander Kudryavtsev | 4–6, 6–3, 7–5 |
| Loss | 12–5 | Aug 2014 | USA F23, Edwardsville | Futures | Hard | (United States) Mitchell Frank | 6–7^{(5–7)}, 2–6 |
| Loss | 12–6 | Feb 2015 | New Delhi, India | Challenger | Hard | (India) Somdev Devvarman | 6–3, 4–6, 0–6 |
| Win | 13–6 | Apr 2015 | Uzbekistan F1, Qarshi | Futures | Hard | (Belarus) Dzmitry Zhyrmont | 6–2, 6–4 |
| Loss | 13–7 | May 2015 | Samarkand, Uzbekistan | Challenger | Clay | (Russia) Teymuraz Gabashvili | 3–6, 1–6 |
| Win | 14–7 | Sep 2015 | Shanghai, China | Challenger | Hard | (China) Di Wu | 3–6, 6–0, 7–6^{(7–3)} |
| Loss | 14–8 | Sep 2015 | Kaohsiung, Taiwan | Challenger | Hard | (South Korea) Chung Hyeon | 5–7, 4–6 |
| Win | 15–8 | Nov 2015 | Pune, India | Challenger | Hard | (Russia) Evgeny Donskoy | 6–2, 7–6^{(7–4)} |
| Win | 16–8 | Dec 2016 | Hong Kong F4, Hong Kong | Futures | Hard | (Japan) Shintaro Imai | 6–4, 7–5 |
| Win | 17–8 | Feb 2017 | India F1, Chandigarh | Futures | Hard | (India) N.Sriram Balaji | 6–2, 6–2 |
| Win | 18–8 | Nov 2017 | Pune, India | Challenger | Hard | (India) Ramkumar Ramanathan | 4–6, 6–3, 6–4 |
| Loss | 18–9 | Feb 2018 | Chennai, India | Challenger | Hard | (Australia) Jordan Thompson | 5–7, 6–3, 5–7 |
| Win | 19–9 | Apr 2018 | Taipei, Taiwan | Challenger | Carpet | (India) Ramkumar Ramanathan | 6–3, 6–4 |

=== Doubles: 30 (17 titles, 13 runner-ups) ===
| Legend ATP Challenger (14–10) ITF Futures (5–3) | Finals by surface Hard (15–13) Clay (2–0) |

| Result | W–L | Date | Tournament | Tier | Surface | Partner | Opponents | Score |
|---|---|---|---|---|---|---|---|---|
| Loss | 0–1 | Sep 2010 | Bangkok, Thailand | Challenger | Hard | (United States) Ryler Deheart | (China) Gong Maoxin (China) Zhe Li | 3–6, 4–6 |
| Loss | 0–2 | Feb 2011 | Cambodia F2, Phnom Penh | Futures | Hard | (India) Vivek Shokeen | (Chinese Taipei) Huang Liang-chi (Chinese Taipei) Lee Hsin-han | 3–6, 4–6 |
| Loss | 0–3 | Oct 2011 | Indonesia F4, Jakarta | Futures | Hard | (India) Rohan Gajjar | (China) Zhe Li (Chinese Taipei) Yi Chu-Huan | 3–6, 2–6 |
| Win | 1–3 | Oct 2011 | Nigeria F3, Lagos | Futures | Hard | (India) Ranjeet Virali-Murugesan | (India) Vishnu Vardhan (India) Karan Rastogi | 6–2, 7–5 |
| Win | 2–3 | May 2012 | Busan, South Korea | Challenger | Hard | (India) Divij Sharan | (Chinese Taipei) Lee Hsin-han (Chinese Taipei) Peng Hsien-yin | 1–6, 6–1, [10–5] |
| Loss | 2–4 | Jul 2012 | Penza, Russia | Challenger | Hard | (India) Divij Sharan | (Russia) Konstantin Kravchuk (Austria) Nikolaus Moser | 7–6^{(7–5)}, 3–6, [7–10] |
| Loss | 2–5 | Aug 2012 | Beijing, China | Challenger | Hard | (India) Divij Sharan | (Thailand) Sanchai Ratiwatana (Thailand) Sonchat Ratiwatana | 6–7^{(3–7)}, 6–2, [6–10] |
| Loss | 2–6 | Sep 2012 | Shanghai, China | Challenger | Hard | (India) Divij Sharan | (Thailand) Sanchai Ratiwatana (Thailand) Sonchat Ratiwatana | 4–6, 4–6 |
| Win | 3–6 | Jul 2013 | Winnetka, United States | Challenger | Hard | (New Zealand) Michael Venus | (India) Somdev Devvarman (United States) Jack Sock | 2–6, 6–2, [10–8] |
| Loss | 3–7 | Sep 2013 | Kaohsiung, Taiwan | Challenger | Hard | (Chinese Taipei) Wang Chieh-Fu | (Colombia) Juan Sebastián Cabal (Colombia) Robert Farah | 4–6, 2–6 |
| Loss | 3–8 | Oct 2013 | Australia F10, Sydney | Futures | Hard | (Japan) Yasutaka Uchiyama | (Australia) Dane Propoggia (New Zealand) José Statham | 4–6, 3–6 |
| Win | 4–8 | Feb 2014 | Chennai, India | Challenger | Hard | (New Zealand) Michael Venus | (India) N.Sriram Balaji (Slovenia) Blaž Rola | 6–4, 7–6^{(7–3)} |
| Win | 5–8 | Sep 2014 | Shanghai, China | Challenger | Hard | (India) Divij Sharan | (India) Somdev Devvarman (India) Sanam Singh | 7–6^{(7–2)}, 6–7^{(4–7)}, [10–8] |
| Loss | 5–9 | Oct 2014 | Indore, India | Challenger | Hard | (India) Divij Sharan | (Spain) Adrián Menéndez Maceiras (Kazakhstan) Aleksandr Nedovyesov | 6–2, 4–6, [3–10] |
| Win | 6–9 | May 2015 | Karshi, Uzbekistan | Challenger | Hard | (Spain) Adrián Menéndez Maceiras | (Belarus) Sergey Betov (Russia) Mikhail Elgin | 5–7, 6–3, [10–8] |
| Loss | 6–10 | Aug 2015 | Aptos, United States | Challenger | Hard | (Australia) Matthew Ebden | (Australia) Chris Guccione (New Zealand) Artem Sitak | 4–6, 6–7^{(2–7)} |
| Loss | 6–11 | Aug 2015 | Vancouver, Canada | Challenger | Hard | (New Zealand) Michael Venus | (Philippines) Treat Huey (Denmark) Frederik Nielsen | 6–7^{(4–7)}, 7–6^{(7–3)}, [5–10] |
| Win | 7–11 | Feb 2016 | New Delhi, India | Challenger | Hard | (India) Mahesh Bhupathi | (India) Saketh Myneni (India) Sanam Singh | 6–3, 4–6, [10–5] |
| Loss | 7–12 | Oct 2017 | Tashkent, Uzbekistan | Challenger | Hard | (India) Divij Sharan | (Chile) Hans Podlipnik Castillo (Belarus) Andrei Vasilevski | 4–6, 2–6 |
| Win | 8–12 | Mar 2021 | M15 Lucknow, India | Futures | Hard | (India) Saketh Myneni | (India) N. Vijay Sundar Prashanth (India) Vinayak Sharma Kaza | 6–2, 6–3 |
| Win | 9–12 | Nov 2021 | M15 Gurugram, India | Futures | Hard | (India) Saketh Myneni | (India) S D Prajwal Dev (India) Rishi Reddy | 6–4, 7–6^{(8–6)} |
| Win | 10–12 | Mar 2022 | M15 Bhopal, India | Futures | Hard | (India) Saketh Myneni | (India) L. Bathrinath (India) A. Shanmugam | 6–4, 6–1 |
| Win | 11–12 | Apr 2022 | M15 New Delhi, India | Challenger | Hard | (India) Saketh Myneni | (India) Anirudh Chandrasekhar (India) Vishnu Vardhan | 6–4, 6–2 |
| Win | 12–12 | Apr 2022 | Salinas, Ecuador | Challenger | Hard | (India) Saketh Myneni | (United States) JC Aragone (Ecuador) Roberto Quiroz | 4–6, 6–3, [10–7] |
| Win | 13–12 | May 2022 | Prostějov, Czech Republic | Challenger | Clay | (India) Saketh Myneni | (Czech Republic) Roman Jebavý (Slovakia) Andrej Martin | 6-3, 7–5 |
| Win | 14–12 | Jul 2022 | Porto, Portugal | Challenger | Hard | (India) Saketh Myneni | (Portugal) Nuno Borges (Portugal) Francisco Cabral | 6–4, 3–6, [10–6] |
| Win | 15–12 | Aug 2022 | Lexington, USA | Challenger | Hard | (India) Saketh Myneni | (Netherlands) Gijs Brouwer (United Kingdom) Aidan McHugh | 3–6, 6–4, [10–8] |
| Win | 16–12 | Aug 2022 | Mallorca, Spain | Challenger | Hard | (India) Saketh Myneni | (Czech Republic) Marek Gengel (Czech Republic) Lukáš Rosol | 6–2, 6–2 |
| Loss | 16–13 | Oct 2022 | Gwangju, South Korea | Challenger | Hard | (India) Saketh Myneni | (Colombia) Nicolás Barrientos (Mexico) Miguel Ángel Reyes-Varela | 6–2, 3–6, [6–10] |
| Win | 17–13 | Jan 2023 | Nonthaburi, Thailand | Challenger | Hard | (India) Saketh Myneni | (Indonesia) Christopher Rungkat (Australia) Akira Santillan | 2–6, 7–6^{(9–7)}, [14–12] |
| Win | 18–13 | Apr 2023 | Girona, Spain | Challenger | Clay | (India) Saketh Myneni | (Spain) Íñigo Cervantes (Spain) Oriol Roca Batalla | 6–4, 6–4 |
| Win | 19–13 | Oct 2023 | Brest, France | Challenger | Hard (i) | (United Kingdom) Julian Cash | (United States) Robert Galloway (France) Albano Olivetti | 6–7^{(5–7)}, 6–3, [10–5] |
