= 2022 UniCredit Czech Open =

- Date: 30 May – 4 June
- Edition: 29th
- Draw: 32S / 16D
- Surface: Clay
- Location: Prostějov, Czech Republic
- Venue: TK Agrofert Prostějov

Champions

Singles
- (Czech Republic) Vít Kopřiva

Doubles
- (India) Yuki Bhambri / (India) Saketh Myneni
- Czech Open

The 2022 UniCredit Czech Open was a professional tennis tournament played on clay courts. It was the 29th edition of the tournament which was part of the 2022 ATP Challenger Tour. It took place in Prostějov, Czech Republic between 30 May and 4 June 2022.

== Singles main-draw entrants ==
=== Seeds ===
Country	Player	Rank^{1}	Seed
ARG	Federico Coria	54	1
~~CZE~~	~~Jiří Veselý~~	~~73~~	~~2~~
~~CZE~~	~~Jiří Lehečka~~	~~77~~	~~3~~
ESP	Pablo Andújar	98	4
SVK	Norbert Gombos	112	5
SWE	Elias Ymer	127	6
SVK	Andrej Martin	128	7
CZE	Zdeněk Kolář	134	8

- ^{1} Rankings are as of 23 May 2022.

=== Other entrants ===
The following players received wildcards into the singles main draw:

- (Czech Republic) Martin Krumich
- (Serbia) Hamad Međedović
- (Slovakia) Lukáš Pokorný

The following player received entry into the singles main draw as a special exempt:

- (Slovakia) Lukáš Klein

The following player received entry into the singles main draw as an alternate:

- (Ukraine) Vitaliy Sachko

The following players received entry from the qualifying draw:

- (France) Térence Atmane
- (Argentina) Francisco Comesaña
- (Uruguay) Martín Cuevas
- (Austria) Alexander Erler
- (Hungary) Fábián Marozsán
- (Austria) Lucas Miedler

The following players received entry as lucky losers:

- (Lebanon) Benjamin Hassan
- (France) Calvin Hemery
- (Germany) Louis Wessels

== Champions ==
=== Singles ===
- (Czech Republic) Vít Kopřiva def. (Czech Republic) Dalibor Svrčina 6–2, 6–2.

=== Doubles ===
- (India) Yuki Bhambri / (India) Saketh Myneni def. (Czech Republic) Roman Jebavý / (Slovakia) Andrej Martin 6–3, 7–5.
