= 2024 Szczecin Open – Singles =

Singles
- 2024 Szczecin Open

Final
- Champion: (Czech Republic) Vít Kopřiva
- Runner-up: (Italy) Andrea Pellegrino
- Score: 7–5, 6–2

Events
Singles	Doubles
- Szczecin Open

Federico Coria was the defending champion but lost in the semifinals to Vít Kopřiva.

Kopřiva won the title after defeating Andrea Pellegrino 7–5, 6–2 in the final.

== Seeds ==
1. (Brazil) Thiago Seyboth Wild (first round)
2. (Argentina) Federico Coria (semifinals)
3. (Spain) Jaume Munar (first round)
4. (Germany) Daniel Altmaier (quarterfinals)
5. (Czech Republic) Vít Kopřiva (champion)
6. (Spain) Albert Ramos Viñolas (first round)
7. (Colombia) Daniel Elahi Galán (first round)
8. (Italy) Stefano Napolitano (first round)

== Draw ==
Key

- Q = Qualifier
- WC = Wild card
- LL = Lucky loser
- Alt = Alternate
- ITF = ITF entry
- PR = Protected ranking
- SR = Special ranking
- SE = Special exempt
- JE = Junior exempt
- JR = Junior Accelerator Programme entrant
- CO = College Accelerator Programme entrant
- NG = Next Gen Accelerator Program entrant
- w/o = Walkover
- r = Retired
- d = Defaulted

=== Finals ===
Semifinals
(South Korea) Gerard Campaña Lee	3	4
(Italy) Andrea Pellegrino	6	6
5	(Czech Republic) Vít Kopřiva	5	7	7^{7}
2	(Argentina) Federico Coria	7	5	6^{4}

Final
(Italy) Andrea Pellegrino	5	2
5	(Czech Republic) Vít Kopřiva	7	6

=== Top half ===
First round
1	(Brazil) T Seyboth Wild	3	6^{5}
(France) G Debru	6	7^{7}
(Argentina) P Cachín	4	3
(South Korea) G Campaña Lee	6	6
(Austria) D Novak	6	6
WC	(Poland) T Berkieta	3	3
(Germany) R Molleker	6	7^{8}
6	(Spain) A Ramos Viñolas	2	6^{6}
4	(Germany) D Altmaier	7^{7}	6
WC	(Poland) D Michalski	6^{3}	2
(Bulgaria) A Andreev	3	6	6
Q	(Germany) Lucas Gerch	6	4	3
Q	(Germany) MH Rehberg	3	6	1
(Italy) G Mager	6	3	6
(Italy) A Pellegrino	6	6
7	(Colombia) DE Galán	3	2

Second round
(France) G Debru	6	5	4
(South Korea) G Campaña Lee	3	7	6
(Austria) D Novak	4	2
(Germany) R Molleker	6	6
4	(Germany) D Altmaier	4	6	6
(Bulgaria) A Andreev	6	3	4
(Italy) G Mager	2	6	6^{1}
(Italy) A Pellegrino	6	3	7^{7}

Quarterfinals
(South Korea) G Campaña Lee	5	7	6
(Germany) R Molleker	7	5	4
4	(Germany) D Altmaier	5	1
(Italy) A Pellegrino	7	6

Semifinals
(South Korea) G Campaña Lee	3	4
(Italy) A Pellegrino	6	6

=== Bottom half ===
First round
5	(Czech Republic) V Kopřiva	2	7	6
(United States) N Moreno de Alboran	6	5	1
Q	(Czech Republic) A Paulson	3	0^{r}
LL	(Germany) S Fanselow	6	0
Q	A Vatutin	6	5	7^{7}
(Kazakhstan) D Popko	4	7	6^{2}
Alt	(Czech Republic) M Vrbenský	6	6
3	(Spain) J Munar	3	4
8	(Italy) S Napolitano	6	2	4
Q	(Italy) J Berrettini	3	6	6
Q	(Czech Republic) H Bartoň	6	0	4
SE	(United Kingdom) J Choinski	4	6	6
(Italy) F Arnaboldi	6	7^{8}
(Spain) J Barranco Cosano	3	6^{6}
WC	(Poland) Olaf Pieczkowski	0	3
2	(Argentina) F Coria	6	6

Second round
5	(Czech Republic) V Kopřiva	6	6
LL	(Germany) S Fanselow	3	0
Q	A Vatutin	6	6
Alt	(Czech Republic) M Vrbenský	3	2
Q	(Italy) J Berrettini	7	6
SE	(United Kingdom) J Choinski	5	3
(Italy) F Arnaboldi	1	6^{5}
2	(Argentina) F Coria	6	7^{7}

Quarterfinals
5	(Czech Republic) V Kopřiva	6	1	6
Q	A Vatutin	4	6	4
Q	(Italy) J Berrettini	5	5
2	(Argentina) F Coria	7	7

Semifinals
5	(Czech Republic) V Kopřiva	5	7	7^{7}
2	(Argentina) F Coria	7	5	6^{4}
