= 2014 Shriram Capital P.L. Reddy Memorial Challenger =

- Date: 3 February–8 February
- Edition: 1st
- Category: ATP Challenger Tour (men)
- Prize money: $50,000
- Surface: Hard
- Location: Chennai, India

Champions

Singles
- (India) Yuki Bhambri

Doubles
- (India) Yuki Bhambri / (New Zealand) Michael Venus
Shriram Capital P.L. Reddy Memorial Challenger	· 2015 →

The 2014 Shriram Capital P.L. Reddy Memorial Challenger was a professional tennis tournament played on outdoor hard courts. It was the first edition of the tournament for the men. It was part of the 2014 ATP Challenger Tour. It took place in Chennai, India, on 3 February to 9 February 2014.

== Singles main draw entrants ==
=== Seeds ===
Country	Player	Rank^{1}	Seed
IND	Somdev Devvarman	103	1
RUS	Evgeny Donskoy	129	2
SLO	Blaž Rola	152	3
UKR	Illya Marchenko	160	4
MDA	Radu Albot	167	5
FRA	David Guez	169	6
IND	Yuki Bhambri	173	7
ITA	Thomas Fabbiano	183	8

- ^{1} Rankings as of 27 January 2014

=== Other entrants ===
The following players received wildcards into the singles main draw:

- (India) Ramkumar Ramanathan
- (India) Saketh Myneni
- (India) Jeevan Nedunchezhiyan
- (India) N. Sriram Balaji

The following players received entry from the qualifying draw:

- (India) Prajnesh Gunneswaran
- (India) Sanam Singh
- (Russia) Victor Baluda
- (New Zealand) Michael Venus

== Champions ==
=== Singles ===
- (India) Yuki Bhambri def. (Russia) Alexander Kudryavtsev, 4–6, 6–3, 7–5

=== Doubles ===
- (India) Yuki Bhambri / (New Zealand) Michael Venus def. (India) N. Sriram Balaji / (Slovenia) Blaž Rola, 6–4, 7–6^{(7–3)}
