= 2022 UniCredit Czech Open – Singles =

Singles
- 2022 UniCredit Czech Open

Final
- Champion: (Czech Republic) Vít Kopřiva
- Runner-up: (Czech Republic) Dalibor Svrčina
- Score: 6–2, 6–2

Events
| Singles | Doubles |
- UniCredit Czech Open

Federico Coria was the defending champion but lost in the first round to Dalibor Svrčina.

Vít Kopřiva won the title after defeating Svrčina 6–2, 6–2 in the final.

== Seeds ==
1. (Argentina) Federico Coria (first round)
2. (Czech Republic) Jiří Veselý (withdrew)
3. (Czech Republic) Jiří Lehečka (withdrew)
4. (Spain) Pablo Andújar (second round)
5. (Slovakia) Norbert Gombos (first round)
6. (Sweden) Elias Ymer (second round)
7. (Slovakia) Andrej Martin (first round)
8. (Czech Republic) Zdeněk Kolář (first round)

== Draw ==
Key

- Q = Qualifier
- WC = Wild card
- LL = Lucky loser
- Alt = Alternate
- ITF = ITF entry
- PR = Protected ranking
- SR = Special ranking
- SE = Special exempt
- JE = Junior exempt
- JR = Junior Accelerator Programme entrant
- CO = College Accelerator Programme entrant
- NG = Next Gen Accelerator Program entrant
- w/o = Walkover
- r = Retired
- d = Defaulted

=== Finals ===
Semifinals
(Czech Republic) Dalibor Svrčina | 7 | 6
SE | (Slovakia) Lukáš Klein | 5 | 2
(Czech Republic) Vít Kopřiva | 1 | 6 | 6
(Slovakia) Filip Horanský | 6 | 4 | 3

Final
(Czech Republic) Dalibor Svrčina | 2 | 2
(Czech Republic) Vít Kopřiva | 6 | 6

=== Top half ===
First round
1 | (Argentina) F Coria | 3 | 6 | 2
(Czech Republic) D Svrčina | 6 | 1 | 6
E Donskoy | 6 | 6
(Argentina) TA Tirante | 3 | 2
(Argentina) F Díaz Acosta | 6^{2} | 6 | 6
Q | (France) T Atmane | 7^{7} | 1 | 4
WC | (Serbia) H Međedović | 6 | 3 | 6
5 | (Slovakia) N Gombos | 3 | 6 | 2
LL | (Lebanon) B Hassan | 7^{7} | 6
(France) A Müller | 6^{5} | 3
LL | (France) C Hemery | 6 | 6
WC | (Slovakia) L Pokorný | 3 | 2
Q | (Austria) A Erler | 4 | 0
SE | (Slovakia) L Klein | 6 | 6
(France) E Couacaud | 6 | 3 | 6
7 | (Slovakia) A Martin | 4 | 6 | 3

Second round
(Czech Republic) D Svrčina | 7 | 4 | 7^{7}
E Donskoy | 5 | 6 | 6^{2}
(Argentina) F Díaz Acosta | 0 | 2
WC | (Serbia) H Međedović | 6 | 6
LL | (Lebanon) B Hassan | 6 | 6
LL | (France) C Hemery | 4 | 4
SE | (Slovakia) L Klein | 6 | 6
(France) E Couacaud | 2 | 3

Quarterfinals
(Czech Republic) D Svrčina | 6 | 6
WC | (Serbia) H Međedović | 2 | 4
LL | (Lebanon) B Hassan | 6^{4} | 5
SE | (Slovakia) L Klein | 7^{7} | 7

Semifinals
(Czech Republic) D Svrčina | 7 | 6
SE | (Slovakia) L Klein | 5 | 2

=== Bottom half ===
First round
6 | (Sweden) E Ymer | 6 | 6
(Hungary) Z Piros | 3 | 3
(Austria) D Novak | 5 | 1^{r}
(Brazil) M Pucinelli de Almeida | 7 | 3
(Czech Republic) V Kopřiva | 6 | 2 | 6
Q | (Argentina) F Comesaña | 3 | 6 | 3
Q | (Austria) L Miedler | 2 | 6 | 2
4 | (Spain) P Andújar | 6 | 3 | 6
8 | (Czech Republic) Z Kolář | 3 | 6 | 2
LL | (Germany) L Wessels | 6 | 3 | 6
Q | (Uruguay) M Cuevas | 3 | 6 | 4
WC | (Czech Republic) M Krumich | 6 | 4 | 6
Alt | (Ukraine) V Sachko | 2 | 6^{7}
(Slovakia) F Horanský | 6 | 7^{9}
(Croatia) D Ajduković | 6^{7} | 6^{4}
Q | (Hungary) F Marozsán | 7^{9} | 7^{7}

Second round
6 | (Sweden) E Ymer | 6 | 6^{3} | 2
(Brazil) M Pucinelli de Almeida | 3 | 7^{7} | 6
(Czech Republic) V Kopřiva | 6 | 7^{7}
4 | (Spain) P Andújar | 1 | 6^{4}
LL | (Germany) L Wessels | 2 | 6 | 4
WC | (Czech Republic) M Krumich | 6 | 0 | 6
(Slovakia) F Horanský | 2 | 7 | 6
Q | (Hungary) F Marozsán | 6 | 5 | 4

Quarterfinals
(Brazil) M Pucinelli de Almeida | 3 | 3
(Czech Republic) V Kopřiva | 6 | 6
WC | (Czech Republic) M Krumich | 5 | 4
(Slovakia) F Horanský | 7 | 6

Semifinals
(Czech Republic) V Kopřiva | 1 | 6 | 6
(Slovakia) F Horanský | 6 | 4 | 3
