= Shriram Capital P.L. Reddy Memorial Challenger =

- 2014 Shriram Capital P.L. Reddy Memorial Challenger

Defunct tennis tournament
- Event name: Shriram Capital P.L. Reddy Memorial Challenger
- Location: Chennai, India
- Venue: SDAT Tennis Stadium
- Category: ATP Challenger Tour
- Surface: Hard (indoor)
- Draw: 32S/28Q/16D/4Q
- Prize money: $50,000
- Website: Website

The Shriram Capital P.L. Reddy Memorial Challenger is a professional tennis tournament played on outdoor hard courts. It is currently part of the ATP Challenger Tour. It has been held annually at the SDAT Tennis Stadium in Chennai, India since 2014.

== Past finals ==
=== Singles ===
Year	Champion	Runner-up	Score	Ref.
2014	(India) Yuki Bhambri	(Russia) Alexander Kudryavtsev	4–6, 6–3, 7–5	

=== Doubles ===
Year	Champion	Runner-up	Score	Ref.
2014	(India) Yuki Bhambri (New Zealand) Michael Venus	(India) Sriram Balaji (Slovenia) Blaž Rola	6–4, 7–6^{(7–3)}	
