= Vít Kopřiva =

Czech tennis player (born 1997)

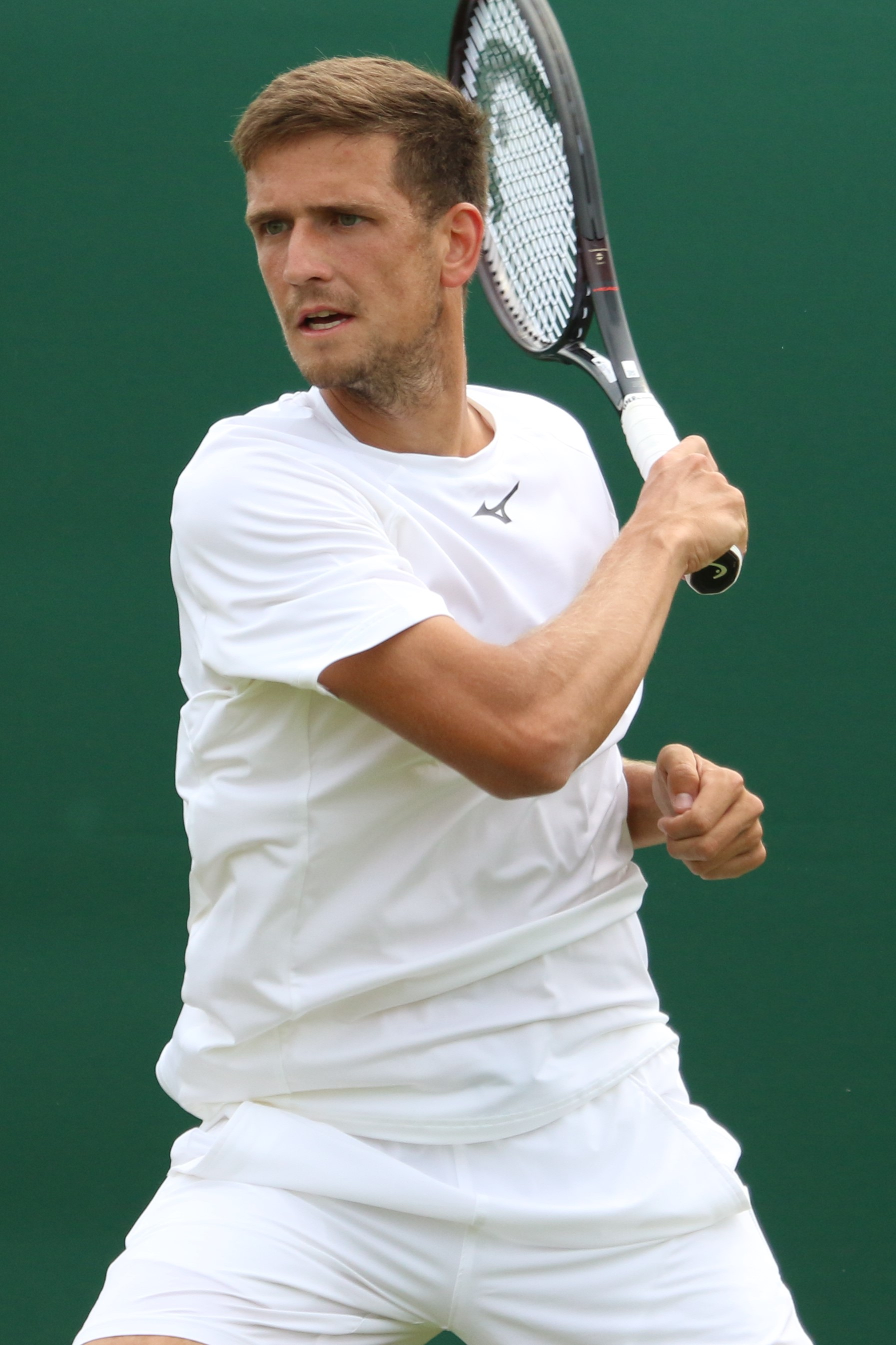
- Kopřiva at the 2023 Wimbledon Championships
- Country (sports): Czech Republic
- Residence: Prostějov, Czech Republic
- Born: 15 June 1997 (age 29) Bílovec, Czech Republic
- Height: 1.78 m (5 ft 10 in)
- Turned pro: 2015
- Plays: Right-handed (two-handed backhand)
- Coach: Lukas Soukup
- Prize money: US $2,153,358

Singles
- Career record: 28–32
- Career titles: 6 Challenger
- Highest ranking: No. 55 (4 May 2026)
- Current ranking: No. 69 (9 November 2026)

Grand Slam singles results
- Australian Open: 2R (2026)
- French Open: 2R (2025, 2026)
- Wimbledon: 1R (2024, 2025, 2026)
- US Open: 1R (2025, 2026)

Doubles
- Career record: 0–2
- Career titles: 2 Challenger
- Highest ranking: No. 261 (17 October 2022)

Grand Slam doubles results
- French Open: 1R (2026)
- Wimbledon: 2R (2026)
- Last updated on: 21 September 2026.

Vít Kopřiva (born 15 June 1997) is a Czech professional tennis player. He has a career-high ATP singles ranking of world No. 55 achieved on 4 May 2026 and a career-high doubles ranking of No. 261 achieved on 17 October 2022. He is the current No. 4 Czech singles player. Kopřiva has won six ATP Challenger singles and two doubles titles.

== Professional career ==
=== 2021: ATP, Top 200 debut, first ATP semifinal & top 10 win ===
He won his maiden Challenger doubles title at the 2021 Aspria Tennis Cup in Milan with Jiří Lehečka. On his ATP debut, ranked at a then-career-high of world No. 249 in singles, at the 2021 Swiss Open Gstaad, Kopřiva defeated Denis Shapovalov for his career-best and first top-10 win. He was the lowest-ranked player to beat a top-10 opponent since then-world No. 698 Thanasi Kokkinakis defeated then-world No. 6 Milos Raonic at The Queen's Club in 2017. Kopřiva advanced to the semifinals with a win over Mikael Ymer in straight sets. He was the second player to reach the semifinals on his ATP Tour debut since May 2012 (Attila Balázs in Bucharest), joining Córdoba champion Juan Manuel Cerúndolo during the 2021 season. His run would come to an end in the semifinals against eventual champion Casper Ruud.

=== 2022-2023: Challenger titles, Top 125 ===
He won his maiden Challenger at the 2022 UniCredit Czech Open in Prostějov, defeating his 19-year-old compatriot Dalibor Svrčina 6–2, 6–2. As a result, he reached the top 150 at world No. 146 on 6 June 2022 and then the top 125 on 18 July 2022.

He fell in the first round of qualifying at the US Open. Despite this result, he reached a career-high ranking of No. 111 on 18 September 2023 following two Challenger titles during the season, in July and August.

=== 2024-2025: Major, Masters debut and first wins, top 100 ===
He qualified for the 2024 Australian Open, making his Grand Slam debut. He also qualified for the 2024 Qatar ExxonMobil Open but lost in the first round to Fábián Marozsán. He made his Masters debut at the 2024 Miami Open after qualifying into the main draw with wins over Rei Sakamoto and J. J. Wolf. He lost to Christopher O'Connell in the first round. He also qualified for his second Grand Slam at the 2024 Wimbledon Championships and lost to Novak Djokovic.

He won the Challenger title at the 2024 Szczecin Open, defeating Andrea Pellegrino. He won his sixth Challenger title, lifting the 2025 Napoli Tennis Cup Trophy with a win over top seed Luciano Darderi.

At the 2025 Grand Prix Hassan II in Marrakech he reached his second ATP quarterfinal, and his first since 2021 Gstaad, defeating Borna Gojo and upsetting second seed Lorenzo Sonego. As a result, he made his debut in the top 100 in the singles rankings on 7 April 2025. Ranked at a career high of No. 92 at the 2025 Italian Open, Kopriva qualified for the main draw and defeated Quentin Halys, recording his first Masters win. Next he upset 32nd seed Sebastián Báez to reach a Masters third round for the first time in his career. Kopřiva made his main draw debut at the 2025 French Open and scored his first win at a major against Thiago Monteiro before losing to Daniel Altmaier. Kopřiva lost in the opening round at the 2025 Wimbledon Championships and the 2025 US Open, where he lost to world No. 1 Jannik Sinner.

=== 2026: ATP 500 semifinal, ATP Masters 1000 round of 16, top 60 ===
Kopřiva entered the 2026 Australian Open directly for the first time in his career and scored his win first at this Major in the first round against Jan-Lennard Struff in a five-set battle, before losing to ninth seed Taylor Fritz in straight sets.

Kopřiva traveled to South America for the Golden Swing and reached two consecutive tour-level quarterfinals for the first time in his career. At the 2026 Argentina Open he defeated Alex Barrena and eighth seed Matteo Berrettini, before losing to top seed and eventual champion Francisco Cerúndolo. At the 2026 Rio Open he defeated Gustavo Heide, Román Andrés Burruchaga and another Argentinian, Juan Manuel Cerundolo, to reach a semifinal at the ATP 500-level for the first time and only his second time at the tour level (since 2021). His run was ended in the semifinals by eventual champion Tomás Martín Etcheverry.

Kopřiva made it to the second round at 2026 BNP Paribas Open after beating local wildcard Michael Zheng to claim his first win at this event, before losing in three sets to 10th seed Alexander Bublik.

Kopřiva reached third quarterfinal in 2026 at 2026 BMW Open after beating wildcard Justin Engel and 6th seed Luciano Darderi. His run was ended by 4th seed and eventual finalist Flavio Cobolli.

Kopřiva reached his first career 4th round at Masters 1000 event at 2026 Mutua Madrid Open, beating Zhang Zhizhen, 9th seed Andrey Rublev and 22nd seed Arthur Rinderknech.

== Performance timeline ==
Key
W	F	SF	QF	#R	RR	Q#	P#	DNQ	A	Z#	PO	G	S	B	NMS	NTI	P	NH

(W) winner; (F) finalist; (SF) semifinalist; (QF) quarterfinalist; (#R) rounds 4, 3, 2, 1; (RR) round-robin stage; (Q#) qualification round; (P#) preliminary round; (DNQ) did not qualify; (A) absent; (Z#) Davis/Fed Cup Zonal Group (with number indication) or (PO) play-off; (G) gold, (S) silver or (B) bronze Olympic/Paralympic medal; (NMS) not a Masters tournament; (NTI) not a Tier I tournament; (P) postponed; (NH) not held; (SR) strike rate (events won / competed); (W–L) win–loss record.
To avoid confusion and double counting, these charts are updated at the conclusion of a tournament or when the player's participation has ended.

=== Singles ===
Tournament	2021	2022	2023	2024	2025	2026	SR	W–L	Win %
Grand Slam tournaments
Australian Open	A	Q2	Q1	1R	Q2	2R	0 / 2	1–2	33%
French Open	A	Q1	Q1	Q2	2R	2R	0 / 2	2–2	50%
Wimbledon	A	Q2	Q1	1R	1R	1R	0 / 3	0–3	0%
US Open	Q1	A	Q1	Q1	1R	1R	0 / 2	0–2	0%
Win–Loss	0–0	0–0	0–0	0–2	1–3	2–4	0 / 9	3–9	25%
ATP 1000 tournaments
Indian Wells Open	A	A	A	Q2	A	2R	0 / 1	1–1	–
Miami Open	A	A	A	1R	A	A	0 / 1	0–1	0%
Monte-Carlo Masters	A	A	Q1	A	A	Q1	0 / 0	0–0	–
Madrid Open	A	A	A	Q1	1R	4R	0 / 2	3–2	0%
Italian Open	A	A	Q2	Q2	3R	2R	0 / 2	3–2	67%
Canadian Open	A	A	A	A	1R	2R	0 / 2	1–2	0%
Cincinnati Open	A	A	A	A	1R	1R	0 / 2	0–2	0%
Shanghai Masters	Not Held		A	A	A	1R	0 / 1	0–1	0%
Paris Masters	A	A	A	A	Q1	Q1	0 / 0	0–0	–
Win–Loss	0–0	0–0	0–0	0–1	2–4	6–6	0 / 11	8–11	29%
Career statistics
	2021	2022	2023	2024	2025	2026	SR	W–L	Win %
Tournaments	1	3	0	7	12	21	Career total: 44		
Titles	0	0	0	0	0	0	Career total: 0		
Finals	0	0	0	0	0	0	Career total: 0		
Hard Win–Loss	0–0	1–1	0–0	1–3	2–5	4–7	0 / 16	8–16	33%
Clay Win–Loss	3–1	1–3	0–0	0–3	7–6	13–11	0 / 23	24–24	50%
Grass Win–Loss	0–0	0–0	0–0	0–1	0–1	2–3	0 / 5	2–5	29%
Overall Win–Loss	3–1	2–4	0–0	1–7	9–12	19–21	0 / 44	34–45	43%
Win %	75%	33%	–	13%	43%	48%	Career total: 43%		
Year-end ranking							$2,789,154		

== ATP Challenger Tour finals ==
=== Singles: 8 (6 titles, 2 runner-up) ===
Legend ATP Challenger Tour (6–2)

Result	W–L	Date	Tournament	Tier	Surface	Opponent	Score
Win	1–0	May 2022	Prostějov, Czech Republic	Challenger	Clay	(Czech Republic) Dalibor Svrčina	6–2, 6–2
Win	2–0	July 2023	Verona, Italy	Challenger	Clay	(Ukraine) Vitaliy Sachko	1–6, 7–6(7–3), 6–2
Win	3–0	Sep 2023	Tulln an der Donau, Austria	Challenger	Clay	(India) Sumit Nagal	6–2, 6–4
Loss	3–1	Aug 2024	Grodzisk Mazowiecki, Poland	Challenger	Hard	(Switzerland) Marc-Andrea Hüsler	1–6, 4–6
Win	4–1	Sep 2024	Szczecin, Poland	Challenger 125	Clay	(Italy) Andrea Pellegrino	7–5, 6–2
Win	5–1	Nov 2024	Lima II, Peru	Challenger	Clay	(Denmark) Elmer Moeller	6–3, 7–6^{(7–3)}
Win	6–1	Mar 2025	Naples, Italy	Challenger 125	Clay	(Italy) Luciano Darderi	3–6, 6–3, 7–6^{(7–4)}
Loss	6–2	Sep 2025	Layjet Open, Austria	Challenger 125	Clay	(United Kingdom) Jan Choinski	5–7, 4–6

=== Doubles: 2 (2 titles) ===
Legend ATP Challenger Tour (2–0)

Result	W–L	Date	Tournament	Tier	Surface	Partner	Opponents	Score
Win	1–0	Jun 2021	Milan, Italy	Challenger	Clay	(Czech Republic) Jiří Lehečka	(Germany) Dustin Brown (Austria) Tristan-Samuel Weissborn	6–4, 6–0
Win	2–0	Sep 2022	Braga, Portugal	Challenger	Clay	(Czech Republic) Jaroslav Pospíšil	(India) Jeevan Nedunchezhiyan (Indonesia) Christopher Rungkat	3–6, 6–3, [10–4]

== ITF Futures/World Tennis Tour finals ==
=== Singles: 14 (5 titles, 9 runner-ups) ===
Legend ITF Futures/WTT (5–9)	Finals by surface Hard (0–3) Clay (5–6)

Result	W–L	Date	Tournament	Tier	Surface	Opponent	Score
Loss	0–1	Aug 2016	Slovakia F4, Bratislava	Futures	Clay	(Czech Republic) Václav Šafránek	6–7^{(6–8)}, 1–6
Loss	0–2	Sep 2016	Egypt F24, Cairo	Futures	Clay	(Czech Republic) Jaroslav Pospíšil	5–7, 4–6
Win	1–2	Sep 2016	Egypt F25, Cairo	Futures	Clay	(Argentina) Mateo Nicolás Martínez	3–6, 6–4, 6–1
Loss	1–3	Mar 2017	Greece F2, Heraklion	Futures	Hard	(Belarus) Yaraslav Shyla	3–6, 3–6
Win	2–3	May 2018	Poland F4, Ustroń	Futures	Clay	(Italy) Dante Gennaro	7–5, 6–1
Loss	2–4	Jul 2018	Czech Republic F5, Ústí nad Orlicí	Futures	Clay	(Czech Republic) David Poljak	4–6, 4–6
Win	3–4	Oct 2018	Turkey F31, Antalya	Futures	Clay	(Sweden) Dragoș Nicolae Mădăraș	7–6^{(7–5)}, 3–1 Ret.
Loss	3–5	Nov 2018	Greece F8, Heraklion	Futures	Hard	(Slovenia) Tom Kočevar-Dešman	6–7^{(1–7)}, 2–6
Loss	3–6	Dec 2018	Egypt F30, Cairo	Futures	Clay	(Italy) Riccardo Bonadio	2–6, 0–6
Loss	3–7	Feb 2019	M15 Sharm El Sheikh, Egypt	WTT	Hard	(Chinese Taipei) Wu Tung-lin	3–6, 3–6
Win	4–7	Mar 2019	M15 Tabarka, Tunisia	WTT	Clay	(Spain) Pol Toledo Bagué	5–7, 6–1,1–0 ret.
Win	5–7	May 2019	M15 Prague, Czech Republic	WTT	Clay	(Czech Republic) Patrik Rikl	6–2, 6–3
Loss	5–8	Sep 2019	M25 Győr, Hungary	WTT	Clay	(Dominican Republic) Roberto Cid Subervi	1–6, 0–6
Loss	5–9	Sep 2019	M25 Říčany, Czech Republic	WTT	Clay	(Czech Republic) Michael Vrbenský	3–6, 6–3, 2–6

== Wins over top 10 players ==
Kopřiva has a 1–3 record against players who were, at the time the match was played, ranked in the top 10.

No.	Player	Rk	Event	Surface	Rd	Score	Rk	Years	Ref
1	(Canada) Denis Shapovalov	10	Swiss Open, Switzerland	Clay	2R	2–6, 6–3, 6–2	249	2021	

- Key: (Rk) first use, opponent rank; (Rd) round; (Rk) 2nd use, player rank; (Ref) reference; (F) final; (SF) semifinal; (QF) quarterfinal; (#R) rounds 4, 3, 2, 1; (RR) round-robin stage; (Q#) qualifying rounds or stages (3), 2, 1.
